= 2026–27 Club Africain season =

Club Africain
2026–27 season
- Chairman: (Tunisia) Mohsen Trabelsi
- Manager: (Tunisia) Faouzi Benzarti (until 20 July 2026) (Tunisia) Maher Kanzari (from 27 July 2026)
- Stadium: Hammadi Agrebi Stadium
- Ligue 1 Pro: 5th (in progress)
- Tunisian Cup: Round of 32
- Tunisian Super Cup: Final
- CAF Champions League: Group stage (in progress)
- Top goalscorer: League: Sadok Kadida (2); All: Sadok Kadida (4)
- Highest home attendance: 26,700 v TP Mazembe (25 October 2026, CAF Champions League)
- Lowest home attendance: 15,800 v ES Zarzis (20 September 2026, Ligue 1 Pro)

The 2026–27 season is Club Africain's 72nd consecutive season in the top flight of Tunisian football. In addition to defending their title in the domestic league, the club is participating in the Tunisian Cup, the Tunisian Super Cup, and the CAF Champions League following their successful domestic campaign the previous season. The season covers the period from 1 July 2026 to 30 June 2027.

== Review ==
=== Background and pre-season ===
The 2026–27 season began dynamically for Club Africain, marked by significant managerial restructuring and financial transition. In order to diversify revenue streams, the club sealed a five-year strategic partnership with the Spanish kit manufacturer Kelme, replacing Umbro. During the summer of 2026, the financial trajectory of the institution experienced a notable structural evolution. The club faced the cessation of financial backing from Fergie Chambers, a financial partner and active supporter. Although Chambers had honored his initial sponsorship contract by providing funds in advance, he chose not to inject any additional money for the summer transfer window due to disagreements regarding the vision of the executive team. Additionally, Chambers faced external legal constraints following his arrest in Spain on 10 July 2026, a matter strictly external to the club's sporting framework. On 20 August 2026, the new Kelme kits were presented alongside a 2026–2031 economic plan aiming for 30 million Tunisian dinars in annual revenues.

=== Managerial changes and events ===
On the technical level, head coach Faouzi Benzarti stepped down on 20 July to manage Al-Ittihad Tripoli. He was replaced by Maher Kanzari on 27 July 2026, who conducted a preparation camp in Aïn Draham. In September, 33-year-old international defender Yassine Meriah officially announced his retirement due to persistent knee injuries, just weeks after joining the club. Meanwhile, a high-profile friendly against French side Angers SCO, scheduled for October to celebrate the club's 106th anniversary, was postponed to November over visa issues.

== First team ==
=== Coaching staff ===
Position	Name
Head coach	(Tunisia) Maher Kanzari
Assistant coach	(Tunisia) Khaled Melliti
Assistant coach	(Tunisia) Sami Zemmit
Goalkeeping coach	(Tunisia) Mohamed Amine Ksiksi
Fitness coach	(Tunisia) Ammar Nebigh
Fitness coach	(Tunisia) Raouf Hammami
Club Doctor	(Tunisia) Wajih Ben Saïd
Physiotherapist	(Tunisia) Wajih Boughrara
Physiotherapist	(Tunisia) Sami Guerchi
Video Analyst	(Tunisia) Houssem Soltani

=== First team squad ===
As of 18 October 2026

No.	Player	Nat.	Position(s)	Date of birth (Age)	Signed in	Signed from
Goalkeepers
1	Mouhib Chamakh	(Tunisia)	GK	25 August 2001 (age 25)	2025	(Tunisia) ES Métlaoui
16	Ghaith Yeferni	(Tunisia)	GK	20 May 1998 (age 28)	2020	(Tunisia) US Ben Guerdane
22	Malek Saada	(Tunisia)	GK	25 March 2006 (age 20)	2025	(Tunisia) Youth Academy
Defenders
3	Ghassen Mahersi	(Tunisia)	DF	20 February 2001 (age 25)	2026	(Tunisia) ES Zarzis
4	Yassine Bouabid	(Tunisia)	DF	8 May 1999 (age 27)	2024	(Tunisia) Olympique Béja
6	Ammar Abdelhak	(Tunisia)	DF	11 January 2007 (age 19)	2026	(Tunisia) Youth Academy
15	Wills Tene Nkingne	(Cameroon)	DF	20 February 2003 (age 23)	2024	(France) Pau FC II
17	Ghaith Zaalouni	(Tunisia)	DF	6 April 2002 (age 24)	2020	(Tunisia) Youth Academy
24	Houssem Hassen Romdhane	(Tunisia)	DF	25 August 2001 (age 25)	2025	(Tunisia) ES Zarzis
25	Mamadou Diatta	(Senegal)	DF	19 January 2006 (age 20)	2026	(Senegal) ASC Jaraaf
33	Houssem Ben Ali	(Tunisia)	DF	10 June 1996 (age 30)	2025	(Tunisia) ES Sahel
36	Ismaïla Simpara	(Mali)	DF	13 June 1998 (age 28)	2026	(Mali) Stade Malien
Midfielders
8	Franck Alain Kanté	(Burkina Faso)	MF	16 December 2006 (age 19)	2026	(Burkina Faso) USFA
10	Mohamed Sadok Mahmoud	(Tunisia)	MF	10 November 2005 (age 21)	2025	(Tunisia) CS Korba
20	Haykeul Chikhaoui	(Tunisia)	MF	4 September 1996 (age 30)	2026	(Kuwait) Al-Nasr SC
25	Yahia Mtiri	(Tunisia)	MF	3 November 2004 (age 22)	2025	(Tunisia) JS Kairouan
28	Saidou Khan	(The Gambia)	MF	5 December 1995 (age 30)	2025	(England) Swindon Town
30	Mootez Zaddem	(Tunisia)	MF	5 January 2001 (age 25)	2026	(Iraq) Al-Shorta SC
32	Osama ElSharimi	(Libya)	MF	20 February 2001 (age 25)	2025	(Libya) Asswehly SC
39	Youssef Mokhtari	(Tunisia)	MF	19 November 2008 (age 17)	2026	(Tunisia) Youth Academy
18	Ryan Ebene Tetego	(Cameroon)	MF	27 September 2007 (age 19)	2026	(Cameroon) Victoria United FC
Forwards
7	Hamza Khadhraoui	(Tunisia)	FW	16 January 1999 (age 27)	2024	(Tunisia) Stade Tunisien
9	Hamza Mnasri	(Tunisia)	FW	17 January 2004 (age 22)	2025	(Tunisia) ES Métlaoui
18	Philippe Kinzumbi	(Democratic Republic of the Congo)	FW	26 January 1999 (age 27)	2024	(Democratic Republic of the Congo) TP Mazembe
19	Bassem Srarfi	(Tunisia)	FW	25 June 1997 (age 29)	2023	(Kuwait) Al-Arabi
21	Bilel Aït Malek	(Tunisia)	FW	19 August 1996 (age 30)	2024	(Tunisia) US Monastir
29	Oussama Bouguerra	(Tunisia)	FW	17 October 1998 (age 28)	2026	(Tunisia) ES Tunis
31	Aymen Harzi	(Tunisia)	FW	1 March 1995 (age 31)	2026	(Tunisia) US Monastir
34	Taddeus Nkeng	(Cameroon)	FW	26 February 2000 (age 26)	2026	(Mali) Stade Malien
40	Sadok Kadida	(Tunisia)	FW	2 December 2003 (age 22)	2026	(Montenegro) Budućnost Podgorica

== Transfers ==
=== In ===
Date	Pos.	Name	From	Type	Source
8 July 2026	DF	(Tunisia) Yassine Meriah	(Tunisia) ES Tunis	Free transfer	
8 July 2026	MF	(Tunisia) Mootez Zaddem	(Iraq) Al-Shorta SC	Free transfer	
14 July 2026	DF	(Tunisia) Ghassen Mahersi	(Tunisia) ES Zarzis	Free transfer	
20 July 2026	MF	(Tunisia) Haykeul Chikhaoui	(Kuwait) Al-Nasr SC	Free transfer	
7 August 2026	FW	(Cameroon) Taddeus Nkeng	(Mali) Stade Malien	Transfer	
14 August 2026	DF	(Mali) Ismaïla Simpara	(Mali) Stade Malien	Transfer	
21 August 2026	DF	(Senegal) Mamadou Diatta	(Senegal) ASC Jaraaf	Transfer	

=== Out ===
Date	Pos.	Name	To	Type	Source
16 June 2026	DF	(Algeria) Toufik Cherifi	(Algeria) JS Kabylie	End of contract	
26 June 2026	MF	(Tunisia) Moataz Zemzemi	(Bulgaria) CSKA 1948 Sofia	End of contract	
7 July 2026	MF	(Tunisia) Ghaith Sghaier	(Tunisia) CS Sfaxien	End of contract	
7 July 2026	DF	(Tunisia) Hamza Ben Abda	(Libya) Al-Ittihad Tripoli	Transfer	
18 July 2026	FW	(Tunisia) Firas Chaouat	(Libya) Al Ahly Benghazi	Transfer	
20 July 2026	DF	(Tunisia) Oussema Shili	(Bahrain) Al-Khaldiya SC	End of contract	
22 July 2026	GK	(Tunisia) Dries Arfaoui	(Tunisia) US Monastir	Mutual termination	
26 July 2026	GK	(Tunisia) Wassim Maghzaoui	(Tunisia) ES Zarzis	End of contract	
29 July 2026	DF	(Tunisia) Aziz Ghrissi	(Tunisia) ES Métlaoui	Loan	
9 August 2026	FW	(Libya) Fahd Al-Mesmary	(Libya) Al Ahly Benghazi	Mutual termination	
3 September 2026	MF	(Tunisia) Charfeddine Ouni	(Tunisia) PS Sakiet Eddaïer	Loan	
26 September 2026	DF	(Tunisia) Yassine Meriah	Retirement	Mutual termination	

==== Friendly matches ====
During the preparation period, Club Africain faced multiple opponents to test their squad. The results were highly positive, with significant victories against local and international teams.

31 July 2026	Club Africain	10–0	ES Khémiri	Aïn Draham
17:28	Srarfi 8'; Kadida 18', 40'; Mnasri 58', 65', 72', 83', 88'; Aït Malek 68', 81'	Report		Stadium: Complexe sportif international Referee: Khalil Jary

2 August 2026	Club Africain	2–0	CA Bizertin	Aïn Draham
08:30	Mahmoud 6'; Zaalouni 6'	Report		Stadium: Complexe sportif international Referee: Hassen Sellami

7 August 2026	Club Africain	3–2	PS Sakiet Eddaïer	Tunis
17:50	Harzi 17'; Chikhaoui 22'; Abdelhak 72'	Report	Omri 6'; Aloui 50'	Stadium: Parc Mounir-Kebaili; Referee: Nizar Riahi

8 August 2026	Club Africain	5–0	US Carthaginoise	Tunis
17:30	Mnasri 22'; Aït Malek 36'; Tetego 38'; Moukhtari 60'; Debbech 83'	Report		Stadium: Parc Mounir-Kebaili; Referee: Nizar Riahi

15 August 2026	Club Africain	0–0	(Algeria) USM Alger	Tunis
17:40		Report		Stadium: Parc Mounir-Kebaili; Referee: Nizar Riahi

16 August 2026	Club Africain	2–0	AS Ariana	Tunis
17:40	Ouni 60'; Nkeng 90' (pen.)	Report		Stadium: Parc Mounir-Kebaili; Referee: Nizar Riahi

26 September 2026	Grombalia Sports	1–2	Club Africain	Grombalia
15:30	Kochbati	Report	Kanté 22'; Tetego 49'	Stadium: Stade Mohsen-Hadded; Attendance: 340

27 September 2026	Club Africain	1–0	ES Fahs	Tunis
15:45	Chikhaoui 48'	Report		Stadium: Parc Mounir-Kebaili; Referee: Sofiene Jbara

3 October 2026	(Libya) Al Ahly Benghazi	0–0	Club Africain	Benghazi
18:00		Report		Stadium: Benghazi International Stadium; Attendance: 30,000

16 November 2026	Club Africain	11–0	CO Transports	Tunis
12:00	Bouguerra 6', 36', 49'; Hassan 8'; Haykeul Chikhaoui 16'; Nkang 19', 24'; Harzi 22'; Mahmoud 35'; Bilel Aït Malek 39', 69'	Report		Stadium: Parc Mounir-Kebaili; Attendance: 0

== Competitions ==
=== Overall record ===
Competition	First match	Last match	Starting round	Final position	Record							
Competition	First match	Last match	Starting round	Final position	Pld	W	D	L	GF	GA	GD	Win %
Ligue 1 Pro	23 August 2026	TBD	Matchday 1	5th	4	3	0	1	4	2	+2	75.00
Tunisian Cup	TBD	TBD	Round of 32	TBD	0	0	0	0	0	0	+0	—
Tunisian Super Cup	TBD		Final	TBD	0	0	0	0	0	0	+0	—
CAF Champions League	5 September 2026	TBD	First preliminary round	TBD	4	2	2	0	5	3	+2	50.00
Total					8	5	2	1	9	5	+4	62.50

Last updated: 18 October 2026
Source: Competitions

=== Tunisian Ligue Professionnelle 1 ===
==== League table ====
Pos	Team	Pld	W	D	L	GF	GA	GD	Pts	Qualification or relegation
2	Espérance de Tunis	7	5	1	1	11	7	+4	16	Qualification for the Champions League
3	Stade Tunisien	7	4	1	2	10	7	+3	13	Qualification for the Confederation Cup
4	Club Africain	7	4	1	2	8	6	+2	13	
5	US Monastir	7	3	3	1	8	6	+2	12	
6	PS Sakiet Eddaïer	7	3	3	1	5	2	+3	12	

Updated to match(es) played on 7 November 2026. Source: Flashscore
Rules for classification: 1) points; 2) head-to-head points; 3) head-to-head goal difference; 4) goal difference; 5) total goals; 6) fairplay ranking; 7) playoff.

==== Results summary ====
Overall								Home						Away					
Pld	W	D	L	GF	GA	GD	Pts	W	D	L	GF	GA	GD	W	D	L	GF	GA	GD
4	3	0	1	4	2	+2	9	2	0	0	2	0	+2	1	0	1	2	2	0

Last updated: 18 October 2026.
Source: FTF

==== Results by round ====
Round	1	2	3	4	5	6	7	8	9	10	11	12	13	14	15	16	17	18	19	20	21	22	23	24	25	26	27	28	29	30
Ground	A	H	A	H	A	H	A	H	A	H	A	H	A	H	A	H	A	H	A	H	A	H	A	H	A	H	A	H	A	H
Result	W	W	P	W	L	W																								
Position	4	1	-	1	5	3																								

Updated to match(es) played on 18 October 2026. Source:
A = Away; H = Home; W = Win; D = Draw; L = Loss; P = Postponed

==== Matches ====
23 August 2026 Round 1	ES Métlaoui	0–1	Club Africain	Métlaoui
16:30	Yassine Soltani (yellow card) 31'	Report	Saidou Khan (yellow card) 31'; Sadok Kadida 87'	Stadium: Stade municipal de Métlaoui; Attendance: 95; Referee: Amir Loussif
Note: Match played in extreme heat (45 °C (113 °F)) and poor pitch conditions.

29 August 2026 Round 2	Club Africain	1–0	ES Hammam-Sousse	Radès
16:30	Mootez Zaddem 89', (yellow card) 90'; Houssem Ben Ali (yellow card) 90+3'	Report	Khalil Mechergui (yellow card) 10'; Malek Baayou (yellow card) 65'	Stadium: Hammadi Agrebi Stadium; Attendance: 17,800; Referee: Houssem Boulaares

17 September 2026 Round 3	Stade Tunisien	Postponed	Club Africain	Le Bardo
16:00				Stadium: Stade Hédi Enneifer; Referee: Haythem Trabelsi
Note: Match postponed due to heavy rain flooding the pitch.

20 September 2026 Round 4	Club Africain	1–0	ES Zarzis	Radès
16:00	Sadok Kadida 56'	Report		Stadium: Hammadi Agrebi Stadium; Attendance: 15,800; Referee: Hamza Jaied

10 October 2026 Round 5	US Ben Guerdane	2–1	Club Africain	Ben Guerdane
14:30	Daniel Oboh 18'; Wael Salhi 90+5'	Report	Osama Mukhtar Al Shremi 24'	Stadium: 7 March Stadium; Attendance: 800; Referee: Bassem Belaid

29 October 2026 Round 6	Club Africain	3–2	CA Bizertin	Radès
14:30	Hamza Khadhraoui 27', 30' (yellow card) 31'; Rayan El Djebali 37'; Ghaith Zaalouni (yellow card) 67'; Mouhib Chamakh (yellow card) 83'; Franck Alain Kanté (yellow card) 90+2'	Report	Yassine Bouabid 58' (o.g.); Mohamed Amine Allela (yellow card) 72'; Omar Faty (yellow card) 73'; Alaeddine Dridi 82' (pen.); Wassim Chihi (yellow card) 84'; Bilel Ouni (yellow card) 90'	Stadium: Hammadi Agrebi Stadium; Attendance: 12,200; Referee: Hosni Naili

=== CAF Champions League ===
==== Qualifying rounds ====
===== First round =====
5 September 2026 First leg	Club Africain (Tunisia)	1–0	(Mali) Djoliba AC	Radès
19:00	Sadok Kadida 71'	Report		Stadium: Hammadi Agrebi Stadium; Attendance: 25,600; Referee: Pierre Nguiene (Congo)
Note: The match was broadcast exclusively on the club's platform All4One, which suffered server saturation. The club compensated fans with two free months.

12 September 2026 Second leg	Djoliba AC (Mali)	2–2	(Tunisia) Club Africain	Bamako
17:00	Abass Kouyaté 16'; Fernand Araba Dakouo 50'	Report	Sadok Kadida 18'; Taddeus Nkeng 76'	Stadium: Stade Mamadou Konaté; Attendance: 4,500; Referee: Hugues Modeste Richard Kokora (Ivory Coast)
Note: Club Africain won 3–2 on aggregate.

===== Second round =====
17 October 2026 First leg	TP Mazembe (Democratic Republic of the Congo)	1–1	(Tunisia) Club Africain	Lubumbashi
14:00	Josué Kazema Baso 37'	Report	Franck Alain Kanté 38'	Stadium: TP Mazembe Stadium; Attendance: 15000; Referee: Dahane Beida (Mauritania)
Note: The match was broadcast on the Diwan Sport platform following an agreement with TP Mazembe, but the transmission suffered from severe technical interruptions. The fixture was also marred by controversy, with Club Africain accusing the Congolese side of witchcraft. For general match reports:

Following a 1–1 draw in Lubumbashi, the second leg in Radès on 25 October was preceded by off-pitch tensions. TP Mazembe reportedly changed their hotel accommodation due to nocturnal disturbances and threatened to lodge a formal complaint with CAF. Domestically, the match was marked by a broadcasting dispute. After failing to reach a financial agreement with the Tunisian national television, Club Africain's board launched a successful crowdfunding campaign, raising 200,000 TND (approximately 20,000 virtual tickets) from supporters in order to broadcast the match for free on YouTube.

On the pitch, Club Africain secured a 1–0 victory through a stoppage-time goal by Cameroonian striker Taddeus Nkeng (45+2'), winning 2–1 on aggregate and advancing to the group stage, officially eliminating the five-time African champions.

25 October 2026 Second leg	Club Africain (Tunisia)	1–0	(Democratic Republic of the Congo) TP Mazembe	Radès
18:00	Taddeus Nkeng 45+2'; Philippe Kinzumbi (yellow card) 18'; Saidou Khan (yellow card) 75'; Ghaith Zaalouni (yellow card) 79'; Sadok Kadida (yellow card) 90'	Report		Stadium: Hammadi Agrebi Stadium; Attendance: 26,700; Referee: Mahmoud Nagy (Egypt)

==== Group stage ====
Following the group stage draw held in Cairo on 28 October 2026, Club Africain were drawn into Group B alongside Zamalek SC (Egypt), Young Africans (Tanzania), and MC Alger (Algeria).
