= List of universities in Tunisia =

This is a list of notable universities in Tunisia.

== Universities ==
- South Mediterranean University, Tunis
- Carthage University, Carthage
- Ez-Zitouna University, Tunis
- ISET Charguia
- Mahmoud el Materi University, Tunis
- Manouba University, Manouba
- Tunis El Manar University, Tunis
- Tunis University, Tunis
- Tunisia Private University, Tunis
- Université Tunis Carthage
- University of Gabès, Gabès
- University of Gafsa, Gafsa
- University of Jendouba, Jendouba
- University of Kairouan, Kairouan
- University of Monastir, Monastir
- University of Sfax, Sfax
- University of Sousse, Sousse
- UPSAT

== See also ==
- List of colleges and universities by country
- List of schools in Tunisia
