= National Engineering School of Sousse =

Academic institution in Tunisia

- المدرسة الوطنية للمهندسين بسوسة
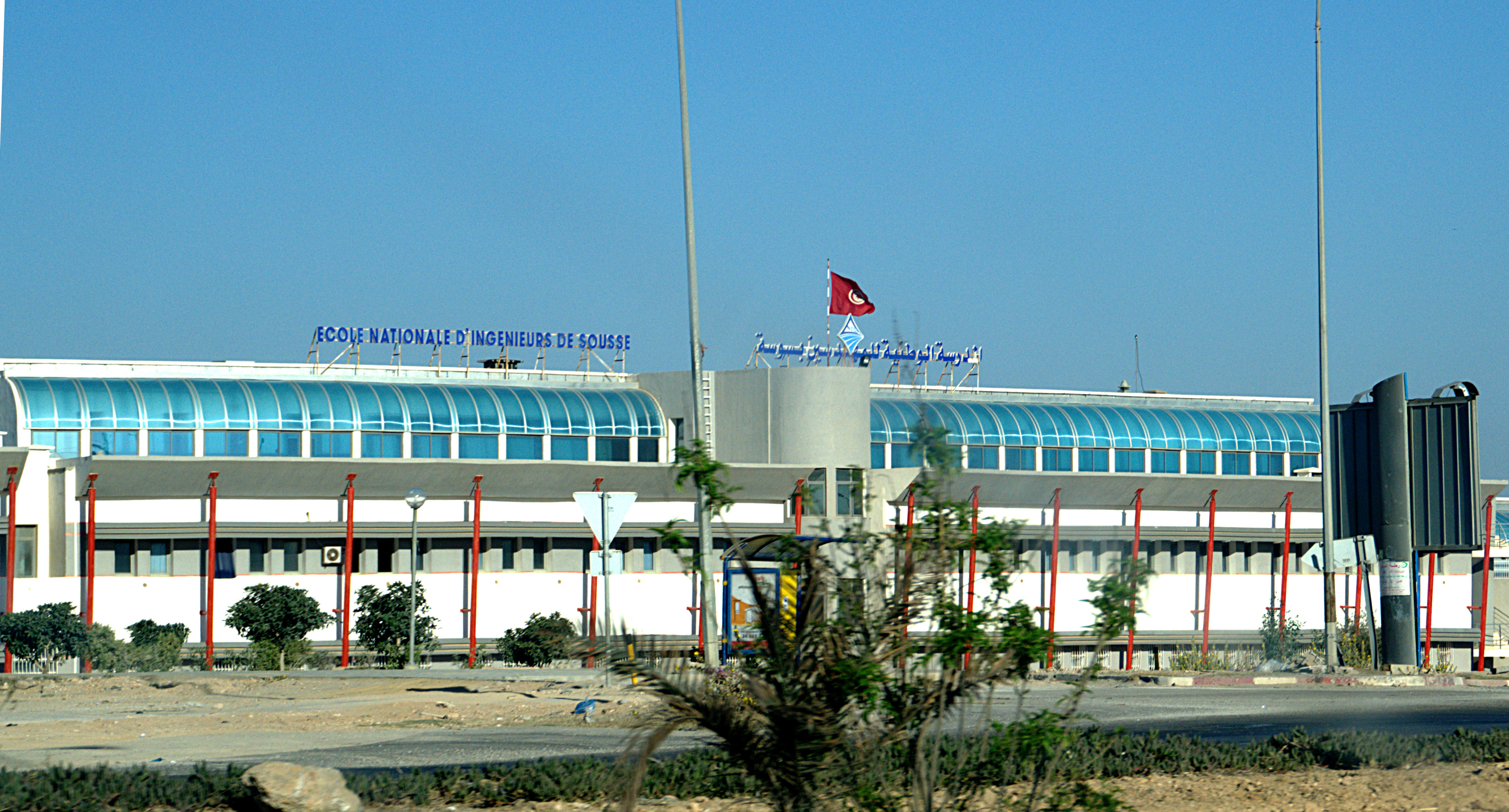
- Type: Public
- Established: 2005
- Location: Sousse, Tunisia; 35°49′12″N 10°35′24″E
- Language: Arabic, French, English
- Website: www.eniso.rnu.tn

- Location within Tunisia

The National Engineering School of Sousse (Arabic: المدرسة الوطنية للمهندسين بسوسة) or ENISo, is a Tunisian engineering national school based in the city of Sousse located in the east of the country. Part of the University of Sousse.

== Establishment ==
The National Engineering School of Sousse was founded in 2005.

== Departments ==
The National Engineering School of Sousse has three independent departments:

- Industrial electronics
- Mechatronics
- Industrial data processing

== See also ==
- National Engineering School of Tunis
- National Engineering School of Bizerte
- National Engineering School of Monastir
- National Engineering School of Sfax
- National Engineering School of Carthage
- National Engineering School of Gafsa
- National Engineering School of Gabès
- University of Sousse
