= Chamakh =

Chamakh or Shamekh is Arabic for "glorious". Notable people with the surname include:

- Abdullah Al-Shamekh (born 1993), Saudi Arabian footballer
- Fatma Chamakh-Haddad (1936-2001), Tunisian professor, philosopher, feminist and activist
- Imbarek Shamekh (born 1952), Libyan politician
- Marouane Chamakh (born 1984), Moroccan footballer
- Mouhib Chamakh (born 2001), Tunisian footballer

== See also ==
- Ouled Chamekh, town in Mahdia Governorate, Tunisia
