= University of Sfax =

Public university in Sfax, Tunisia

- Type: Public
- Established: 1986
- Affiliations: UNIMED
- Rector: Abdelwaheed Mokni
- Faculty: 8
- Administrative staff: 2,495
- Students: 48,514
- Location: Sfax, Tunisia; 34°44′13.5″N 10°44′36.8″E
- Website: www.uss.rnu.tn/

The University of Sfax (Arabic: جامعة صفاقس French: Université de Sfax) is a university located in Sfax, Tunisia. It was founded in 1986 under the name University of the South with the purpose of covering all academic institutions in Southern Tunisia. It is divided into three universities, including the current University of Sfax, with the creation of the University of Gabes in 2003 and the University of Gafsa in 2004.

== Organization ==
University rankings

Global – Overall
- ARWU World: 901–1000 (2023)
- QS World: 1001–1200 (2024)
- THE World: 1001–1200 (2024)
- USNWR Global: =1017 (2023)

The University of Sfax had 43,473 students in 2008–2009. The students were distributed among 21 higher education institutions, five research faculties, three colleges, twelve institutes, and a research center. They are the:

- Faculty of Medicine of Sfax
- Faculty of Economics and Management
- Faculty of Law
- Faculty of Arts and Humanities
- Faculty of Science
- National Engineering School
- Graduate School of Business
- Graduate School of Science and Technology in Health
- Higher Institute of Arts and Crafts
- Institute of Music
- Higher Institute of Computer Science and Multimedia
- Higher Institute of Business Administration
- Higher Institute of Sport and Physical Education
- Preparatory Institute for Engineering Studies
- Institute of High Business Studies
- Higher Institute of Industrial Management
- Higher Institute of Electronics and Communication
- Higher Institute of Biotechnology
- Higher Institute of Technological Studies
- Institute of the Olive Tree
- Biotechnology Center

The University of Sfax maintains partnerships with large corporations and academic cooperation in research and exchange programs with foreign universities in several countries like France, Canada, Belgium, Morocco, etc.

== Faculty of Medicine of Sfax ==
Faculty of Medicine of Sfax (FMS)
- كلية الطب بصفاقس
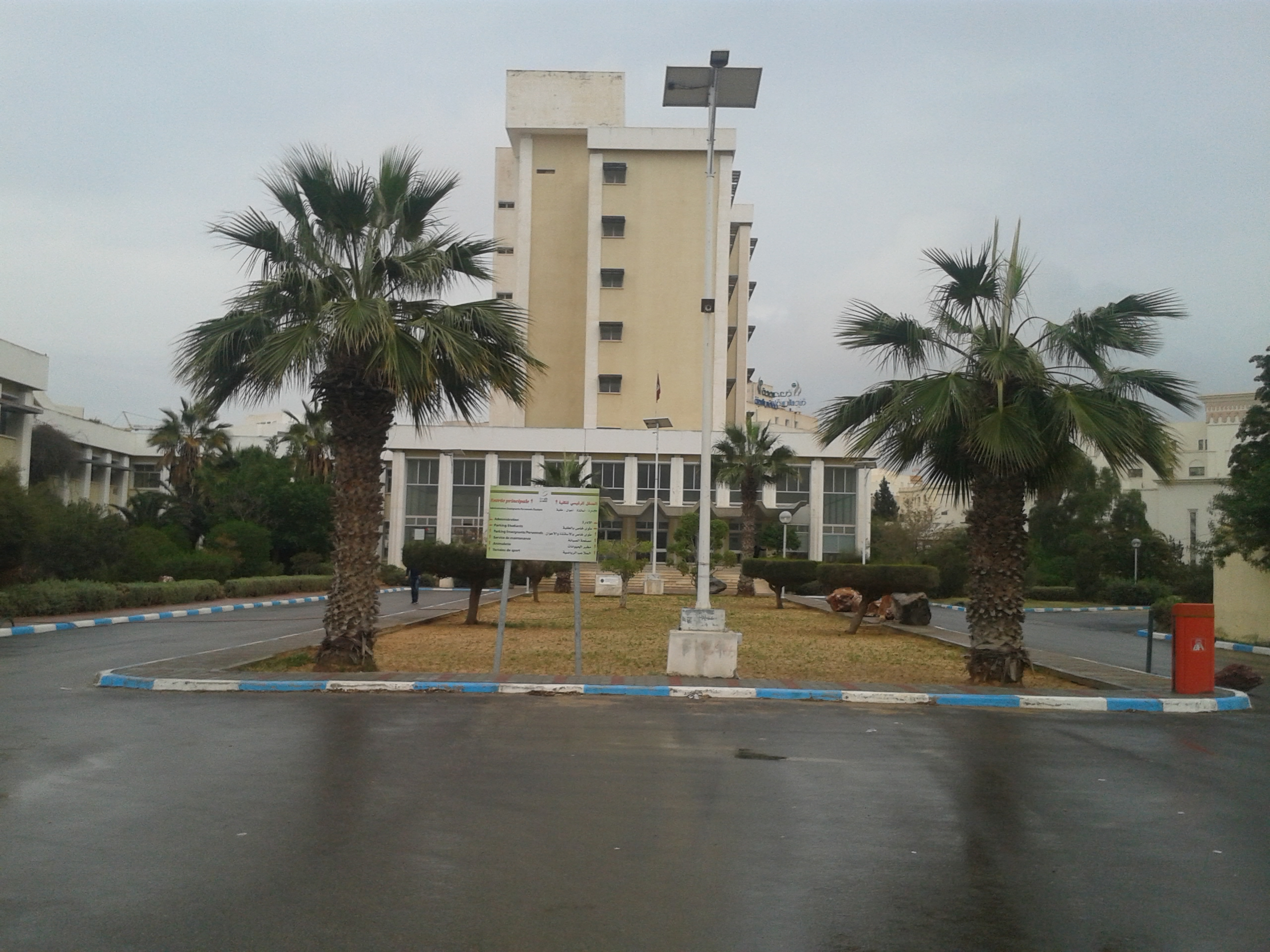
- FMS entrance.
- Other name: Faculté de Médecine de Sfax
- Type: Public
- Established: 1974
- Location: Sfax, Tunisia; 34°44′26″N 10°45′24″E
- Language: Arabic, French, English
- Website: www.medecinesfax.org
- Location within Tunisia

== Overview ==
The Faculty of Medicine of Sfax (Arabic: كلية الطب بصفاقس) or FMS, is a Tunisian university establishment created according to the law N°74-83 of December 11, 1974.

== Flat Earth controversy ==
In April 2017, it was revealed that an anonymous PhD student at the university had submitted a thesis defending a flat Earth, and that it had passed the initial review stage, although its thesis defense was unsuccessful. It also defended geocentrism and young-Earth creationism, and denied Newtonian mechanics and the Big Bang, largely based upon a literal and widely rejected interpretation of the Quran. The incident sparked discussion on the academic standards in Tunisia and the Arab World. Faouzia Charfi, a professor at the nearby University of Tunis, asked, "How can we accept that the University is not the space of knowledge, of scientific rigor, but that of the negation of science? That where science is refused because it is not in conformity with Islam?" The Quran does not actually support flat-Earth, geocentrism and young Earth beliefs. Such interpretations have been widely rejected and rebutted by most Islamic scholars throughout history and such views are extremely rare among Muslims.

Belgian astronomer Yaël Nazé also wrote an article on the subject. She commented that even though the thesis was first publicly announced on April 1, "it was not an April Fool’s joke."

== See also ==
- List of colleges and universities
