= Amel Ben Abda =

Tunisian mathematician

- Education: Preparatory Institute for Engineering Studies of Nabeul; National Engineering School of Tunis
- Scientific career
- Workplaces: National Engineering School of Tunis
- Thesis: (1993)

Amel Ben Abda is a professor of mathematics at the National Engineering School of Tunis. She was the first to earn a PhD in applied mathematics in Tunisia. She is the Tunisian representative of the steering committee of the International Laboratory for Computer Sciences and Applied Mathematics on the advisory board of the Tunisian Woman Mathematician Association.

== Early life and education ==
Ben Abda studied applied mathematics at the National Engineering School of Tunis, graduating in 1988. After her degree, she worked in the Preparatory Institute for Engineering Studies of Nabeul. She went on to earn her Master's Degree in Applied Mechanics in 1988 where she also had got her PhD in Applied Mathematics in 1993.. With that she also had an impact on the inception of the country's applied mathematics doctoral program. After going on to defend her habilitation in applied mathematics at the National Engineering School of Tunis in 1998.

== Research and career ==
In the field of applied mathematics, Ben Abda has worked on a "reciprocity gap" method that can be used as an indication of defects in materials. She also works on the problem of reconstructing boundary conditions from incomplete data.

In 1993, Ben Abda joined the Preparatory Institute for Scientific and Technical Studies, where she was promoted to assistant professor that same year. In 1999 she joined the National Engineering School of Tunis. When she defended Tunisia's first habilitation it was in 1998. She is responsible for the inverse theorems team at the Laboratory of Mathematical Modelling and Numeric in Engineering Sciences (LAMSIN).

She is the Tunisian representative of the steering committee of the International Laboratory for Computer Sciences and Applied Mathematics. She is on the advisory board of the Tunisian Woman Mathematician Association (TWMA). The TWMA give an annual award for the best PhD thesis in mathematics.

In 1999, she published the article "Reciprocity principle and crack identification" with Stéphane Andrieux and Huy Duong Bui, later referring its work as here most influential and impactful research she has done on real world problems.

In 2018 she was selected as one of OkayAfrica's Top 100 Women.

In 2016 she received a trophy at their annual meeting, and the trophy was for her impact on Tunisian Women that are also in the field of mathematics.

She is a prominent advocate to the Tunisian Women in Mathematics Association, she was actively a part of broader to helping with empowering other women who are also in STEM all across the continent.
