= Preparatory Institute for Engineering Studies of Nabeul =

Academic institution in Tunisia

- المعهد التحضيري للدراسات الهندسية بنابل
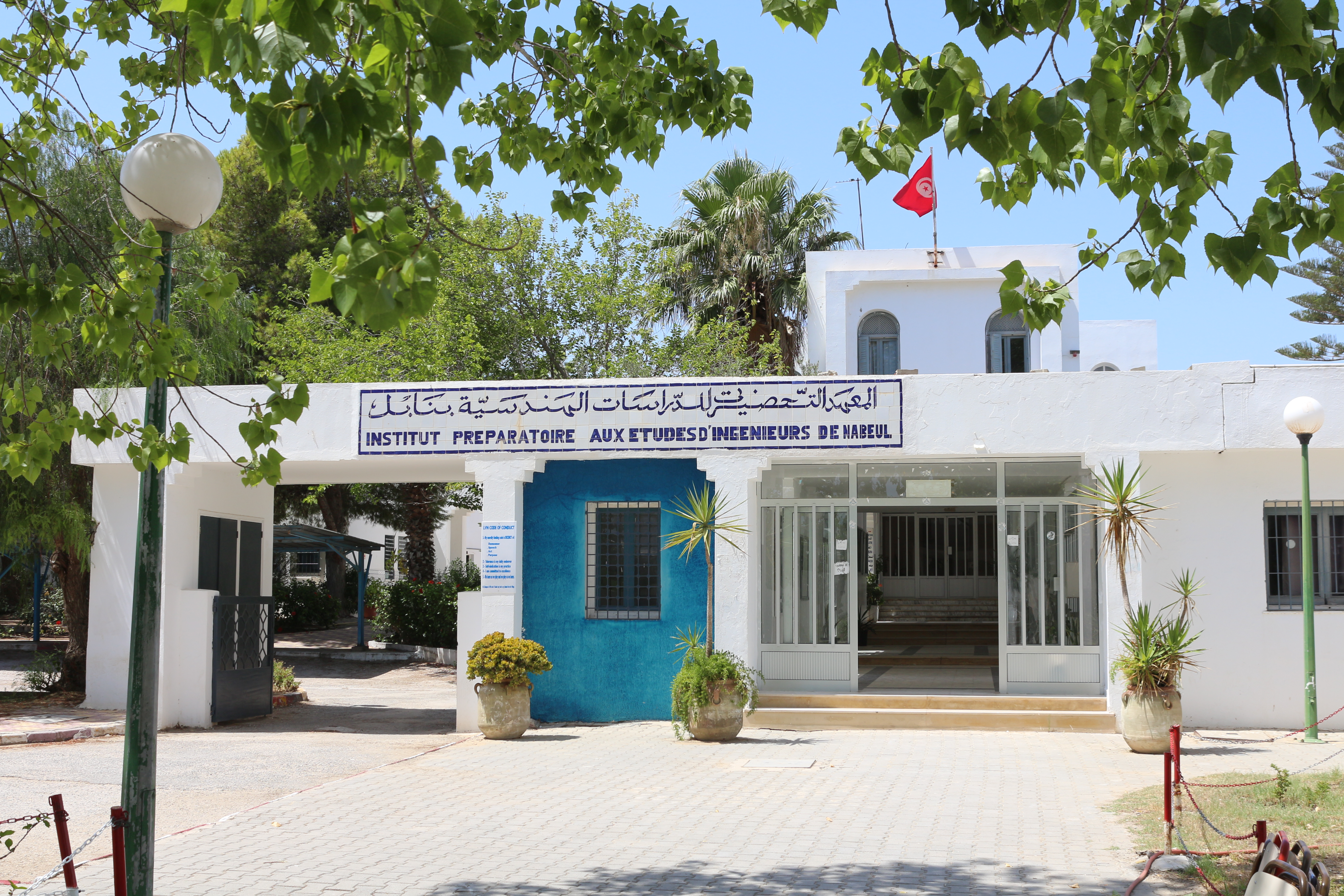
- Nabeul Preparatory Engineering Institute entrance
- Type: Public
- Established: 1986
- Location: Nabeul, Tunisia; 36°26′16.2″N 10°40′46.0″E
- Language: Arabic, French, English
- Website: www.ipein.rnu.tn
- Location within Tunisia

Preparatory Institute for Engineering Nabeul (المعهد التحضيري للدراسات الهندسية بنابل) or IPEIN is a Tunisian university establishment founded in 1986 according to the law N°86-954. Part of the University of Carthage. It is the first preparatory engineering institute in Tunisia.It is located in Mrezka, Nabeul.

== Mission ==
The main mission of the institute is to provide a two-year curriculum of intense mathematics, physics and industrial science courses to prepare students for the national engineering selective exams, or commonly known in French as concours nationaux d'entrée aux cycles de formation d'ingénieurs. Success in the exams is determined by a score-based ranking system limited by a national quota. Successful candidates can apply to technical and scientific schools, such as the Polytechnic School of Tunisia and the Graduate School of Communications of Tunis. Each school has its own quotas for each one of its programs. Notable schools will generally require a very good rank (300 and below).

== See also ==
=== Preparatory Institute ===
- Monastir Preparatory Engineering Institute
- Tunis Preparatory Engineering Institute
- El Manar Preparatory Engineering Institute
- Sfax Preparatory Engineering Institute
