= Sana Mersni =

Tunisian politician

Sana Mersni (born 1 December 1984) is a Tunisian politician who is a deputy in the Assembly of the Representatives of the People.

== Early life and education ==
Mersni was born on 1 December 1984 in Jendouba. She studied literature before completing a master's degree in criminal science at Tunis El Manar University Law School. She is writing a PhD thesis on the democratic transition in Tunisia.

== Career ==
Mersni practiced as a lawyer but had no political experience before she joined the Ennahda Movement and was elected to the National Constituent Assembly in 2011 to represent the Jendouba constituency. She was involved in writing the 2014 Constitution. She was then elected to the Assembly of the People's Representatives in 2014. She is a rapporteur of the General Legislation Commission.

In 2014, Mersni and Latifa Habachi proposed an amendment to the constitution to give the government power to nominate members of the judiciary. It was strongly opposed by Popular Front and Democratic Bloc opposition members and led to a call from the Tunisian Judges' Syndicate for strikes, but was accepted by 109 votes. In 2015, when the Tunisian parliament reinstated the death penalty for terrorist crimes, Mersni noted that it would not deter "terrorists seeking death in order to go to paradise."
