= Slaheddine Cherif =

Tunisian government official (1937–2023)

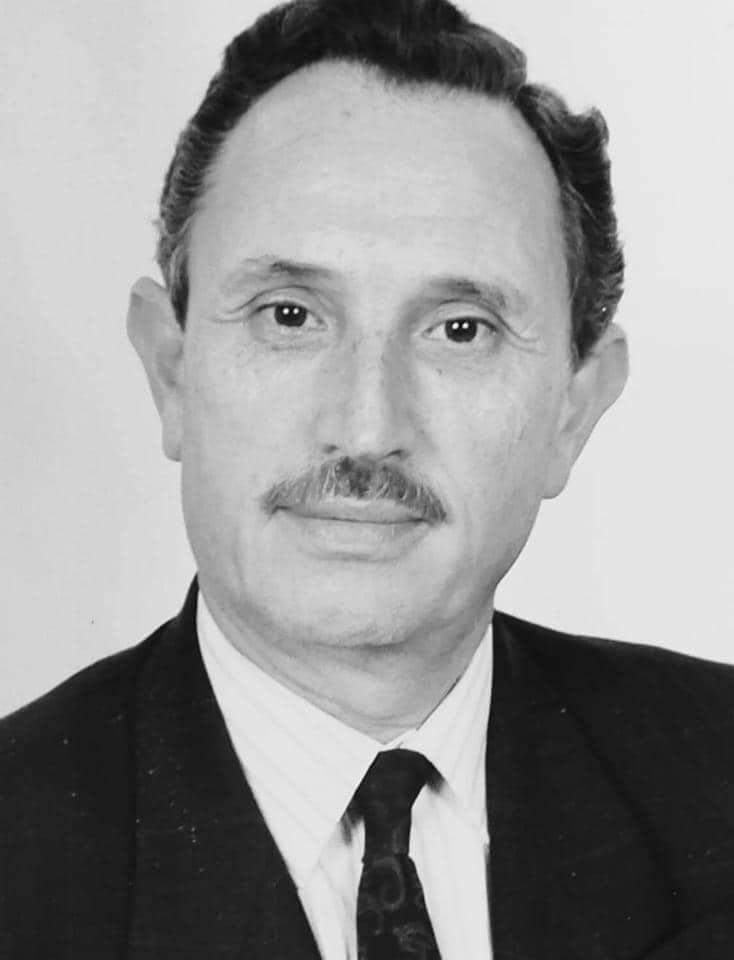

Secretary-General of the Presidency of the Republic of Tunisia
- In office 17 November 1999 – 29 January 2011
- President: Zine El Abidine Ben Ali

Secretary of State of Administrative Reform and Civil Service
- In office 11 October 1991 – 23 April 1999
- President: Zine El Abidine Ben Ali

Magistrate
- In office 1974–1981
- President: Habib Bourguiba

Personal details
- Born: 10 September 1937 Sidi Bou Saïd
- Died: 6 January 2023 (aged 85) Tunis
- Education: Tunis El Manar University; University of Paris
- Occupation: Tunisian Government official

Slaheddine Cherif (Arabic: صلاح الدين الشريف; 10 September 1937– 6 January 2023) was a Tunisian government official.

== Biography ==
Born in Tunis on 10 September 1937, Cherif studied law and criminology at the Tunis El Manar University and later at the Faculty of Law of Paris. He also earned a degree from the Institut de défense nationale.

Cherif began his work in the civil service at the Ministry of Communications from 1970 to 1973 before serving as a magistrate with the Higher Administrative Court from 1974 to 1981. After serving in various other government roles, he became director-general of the Ministry of Foreign Affairs in 1988.

On 11 October 1991, Prime Minister Hamed Karoui named him Secretary of State of Administrative Reform and Civil Service. On 17 November 1999, he became Secretary-General of the Presidency of the Republic of Tunisia under Zine El Abidine Ben Ali.

Cherif died on 6 January 2023, at the age of 85. He was buried in the Jellaz Cemetery.
