= National Engineering School of Sfax =

- المدرسة الوطنية للمهندسين بصفاقس
- Type: Public
- Established: 1983
- Location: Sfax, Tunisia; 34°43′48″N 10°43′12″E
- Language: Arabic, French, English
- Website: www.enis.rnu.tn
- Location within Tunisia

The National Engineering School of Sfax (Arabic: المدرسة الوطنية للمهندسين بصفاقس) or ENIS, is a Tunisian engineering school and research establishment based in the city of Sfax located in the east of the country. It is a part of the University of Sfax.

== Establishment ==
The National Engineering School of Sfax was founded in 1983.

== Departments ==
The National Engineering School of Sfax has seven independent departments:

- Biological engineering
- Civil engineering
- Electrical engineering
- Computer engineering and applied mathematics
- Geology
- Materials Engineering
- Mechanical engineering

== See also ==
- National Engineering School of Tunis
- National Engineering School of Monastir
- National Engineering School of Sousse
- National Engineering School of Bizerte
- National Engineering School of Gabès
- National Engineering School of Gafsa
- National Engineering School of Carthage
- University of Sfax
