= Sfax (disambiguation) =

Sfax is a city in Tunisia.

Sfax may also refer to:

- Sfax (crater), on Mars
- French cruiser Sfax
- French submarine Sfax
- Sfax Governorate, Tunisia
- University of Sfax
