= Alya Baffoun =

Tunisian feminist and sociologist

- Education: University of Paris,
- Occupations: Feminist and Sociologist

Alya or Alia Baffoun is a Tunisian feminist and sociologist.

== Life ==
Alya Baffoun studied at the University of Paris, gaining a PhD in psychology in 1969 with a thesis on the loss of schoolteachers in Third World countries. She joined the University of Tunis, where she was based in the Faculty of Letters and Human Sciences, and at the Center for Social and Economic Study and Research (CERES). In 1980 she was among 12 expert co-authors of a UNESCO document on research and teaching.

== Works ==
- 'Tunisian Women's Access to Salaried Work', Al-Raida Journal, Issue 20 (May 1982), pp. 7–8. https://doi.org/10.32380/alrj.v0i0.1489
- 'Women and Social Change in the Muslim Arab World', Women's Studies International Forum, Vol. 5, Issue 2 (1982), pp. 227–242. Translated from the French by Azizah al-Hibri and Eric Deudon.
- (with Fredj Stambouli) Social science and historical specificity: the case of the Arab Maghreb. Vienna Institute for Development, 1982
- 'Research in the Social Sciences on North African Women: Problems, Trends and Needs', in Social Science Research and Women in the Arab World, Paris: Unesco, 1984.
- 'Future of Feminism in Africa', Echo, AAWORD Newsletter 2/3 (1985), pp. 4–6
- 'Feminism and Muslim Fundamentalism: The Tunisian and Algerian Cases', in Valentine M. Moghadam, ed., Identity Politics and Women , Westview Press, 1994.
