= National Engineering School of Bizerte =

- المدرسة الوطنية للمهندسين ببنزرت
- Type: Public
- Established: 2009
- Location: Bizerte, Tunisia; 37°14′06.9″N 9°53′08.9″E
- Language: Arabic, French, English
- Location within Tunisia

The National Engineering School of Bizerte (ENIB; Arabic: المدرسة الوطنية للمهندسين ببنزرت) is a Tunisian engineering school based in the city of Bizerte located in the north of the country. It is part of the Carthage University.

== Establishment ==
The National Engineering School of Bizerte was founded in 2009.

== Departments ==
The National Engineering School of Bizerte has three independent departments:

- Mechanical engineering
- Industrial engineering
- Civil engineering

== See also ==
- National Engineering School of Tunis
- National Engineering School of Monastir
- National Engineering School of Sousse
- National Engineering School of Carthage
- National Engineering School of Sfax
- National Engineering School of Gabès
- National Engineering School of Gafsa
- Carthage University
