= Carthage University =

University in Tunis, Tunisia

University of Carthage
- Université de Carthage جامعة قرطاج
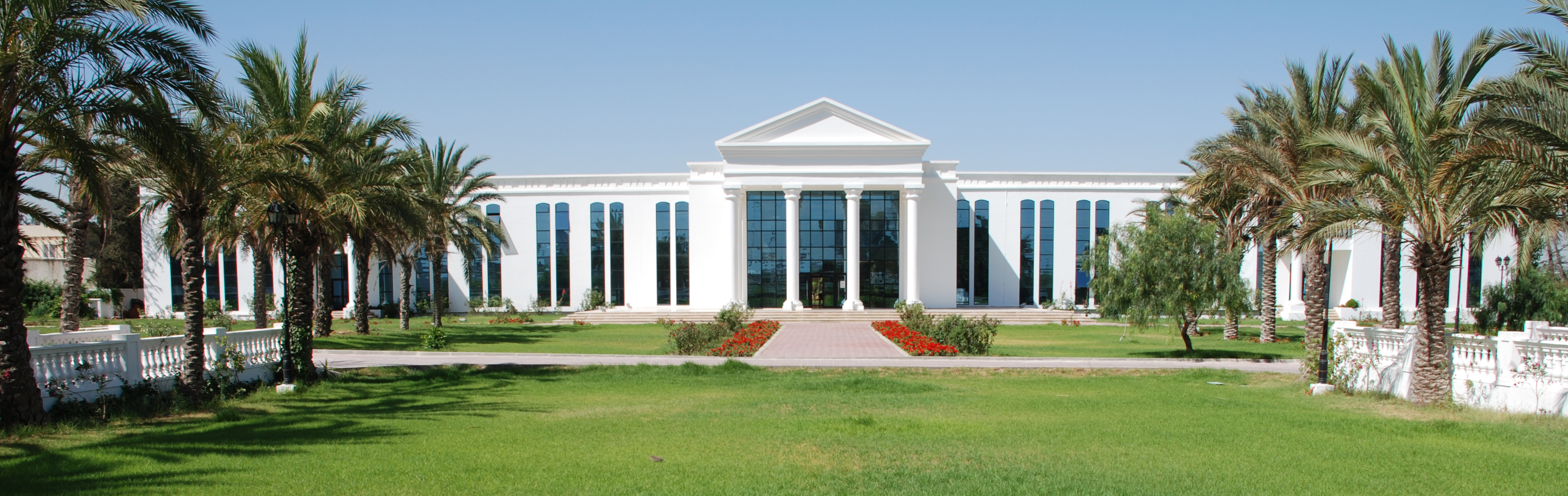
- Former name: Carthage 7 November University
- Motto: I shall either find a way or make one.
- Type: Public
- Established: 1988
- Affiliations: UNIMED
- Administrative staff: Nadia Mzoughi Aguir, Mme le Président
- Students: 48,634
- Location: Tunis, Tunisia; 36°52′14″N 10°20′04″E
- Website: www.ucar.rnu.tn/

The University of Carthage (French: Université de Carthage, Arabic: جامعة قرطاج) is a university located in Tunis, Tunisia, and was founded in 1988.

== Organization ==
University of Carthage is formed by 21 institutions under single-supervision and 12 under joint-supervision. The first category is composed by:

- Faculty of Juridical, Political and Social Sciences, Tunis
- Faculty of Sciences, Bizerte
- Faculty of Economic Sciences and Management, Nabeul
- National School of Architecture and Urbanism, Tunis
- Tunisia Polytechnic School
- Higher School of Technology and Computer Science
- Higher School of Statistics and Information Analysis
- The Gammarth Higher Institute of Audiovisual and Film Studies
- Bizerte Preparatory Engineering Institute
- Institute of Advanced Business Studies, Carthage
- National Institute of Applied Science and Technology
- Higher Institute of Applied Sciences and Technology, Mateur
- Nabeul Preparatory Engineering Institute
- Preparatory Institute for Scientific and Technical Studies, La Marsa
- Higher Institute of Fine Arts, Nabeul
- Higher Institute of Environment, Urbanism and Building Technologies
- Higher Institute of Languages, Tunis
- Higher Institute of Applied Languages and Computer Science of Nabeul
- Higher Institute of Sciences and Technology of Environment of Borj Cedria
- Higher Institute of Business and Accountancy of Bizerte
- National Engineering School of Bizerte

The second category contains basically:

- Higher School of Communication of Tunis

== See also ==
- List of Arab Universities
- List of universities in Tunisia
- Tunis
- Carthage
