= National Engineering School of Carthage =

- المدرسة الوطنية للمهندسين بقرطاج
- Former names: Higher School of Technology and Computer Science
- Type: Public
- Established: 2002
- Location: Ariana, Tunisia; 36°51′0″N 10°12′36″E
- Language: Arabic, French, English
- Location in Tunisia

The National Engineering School of Carthage (Arabic: المدرسة الوطنية للمهندسين بقرطاج) or ENICarthage, is a Tunisian engineering school based in the city of Ariana located in the north of the country. Part of the Carthage University.

== Establishment ==
The National Engineering School of Carthage was founded in 2002.

== See also ==
- National Engineering School of Tunis
- National Engineering School of Monastir
- National Engineering School of Bizerte
- National Engineering School of Sousse
- National Engineering School of Gabès
- National Engineering School of Sfax
- National Engineering School of Gafsa
- Carthage University
