= El Manar Preparatory Engineering Institute =

Academic institution in Tunisia

- المعهد التّحضيري للدّراسات الهندسيّة بالمنار
- Type: Public
- Established: 2001
- Location: Tunis, Tunisia; 36°49′48″N 10°8′24″E
- Campus: El Manar
- Language: Arabic, French, English
- Website: www.ipeiem.rnu.tn
- Location in Tunisia

The El Manar Preparatory Engineering Institute (Arabic: المعهد التّحضيري للدّراسات الهندسيّة بالمنار) or IPEIEM, is a Tunisian university establishment created according to the law N°2001-1912 on August 17, 2001. Part of the University of Tunis El Manar

== Mission ==
Its mission is to prepare students for the national entrance exam to engineering schools (French: Concours national d'entrée aux écoles d'ingénieurs).

== Departments ==
The Institute provides several primary cycle course specialties which consists of four independent departments:

- Physics (PH)
- Chemistry (CH)
- Math and computing (MI) (French: Math Informatique)
- Engineering Sciences and Technology (STI) (French: Sciences et Techniques de l'Ingénieur)

== See also ==
=== Preparatory Institute ===
- Tunis Preparatory Engineering Institute
- Monastir Preparatory Engineering Institute
- Preparatory Institute for Engineering Studies of Nabeul
- Sfax Preparatory Engineering Institute

=== Other ===
- University of Tunis El Manar
