= National Engineering School of Monastir =

- المدرسة الوطنية للمهندسين بالمنستير
- Type: Public
- Established: 1987
- Location: Monastir, Tunisia; 35°45′55.5″N 10°48′14.1″E
- Language: Arabic, French, English
- Website: www.enim.rnu.tn
- Location within Tunisia

The National Engineering School of Monastir (Arabic: المدرسة الوطنية للمهندسين بالمنستير) or ENIM, is a Tunisian engineering school based in the city of Monastir located in the east of the country. It is part of the University of Monastir.

== Establishment ==
The National Engineering School of Monastir was founded in 1987.

== Departments ==
The National Engineering School of Monastir has four independent departments:

- Mechanical engineering
- Electrical engineering
- Textile engineering
- Energy engineering

== See also ==
- National Engineering School of Tunis
- National Engineering School of Bizerte
- National Engineering School of Sousse
- National Engineering School of Gafsa
- National Engineering School of Gabès
- National Engineering School of Sfax
- National Engineering School of Carthage
- Monastir Preparatory Engineering Institute
- Faculty of sciences of Monastir
- University of Monastir
- ENSAIT
