= Monastir Preparatory Engineering Institute =

- المعهد التحضيري للدراسات الهندسية بالمنستير
- Type: Public
- Established: 1992
- Location: Monastir, Tunisia; 35°45′57.6″N 10°48′12.6″E
- Language: Arabic, French, English
- Website: www.ipeim.rnu.tn
- Location within Tunisia

The Monastir Preparatory Engineering Institute (Arabic: المعهد التحضيري للدراسات الهندسية بالمنستير) or IPEIM, is a Tunisian university establishment created according to the law N° 95–40 in 1992. Part of the University of Monastir

== Departments ==
The Monastir Preparatory Engineering Institute has three independent departments :

- Mathematics and Physics (MP)
- Physics and Chemistry (PC)
- Technology (PT)

== See also ==
=== Preparatory Institute ===
- Tunis Preparatory Engineering Institute
- Preparatory Institute for Engineering Studies of Nabeul
- El Manar Preparatory Engineering Institute
- Sfax Preparatory Engineering Institute

=== Other ===
- National Engineering School of Monastir
- University of Monastir
- Faculty of sciences of Monastir
