= Adnen Mansser =

Tunisian author, historian, professor and politician

Adnen Mansser عدنان منصر
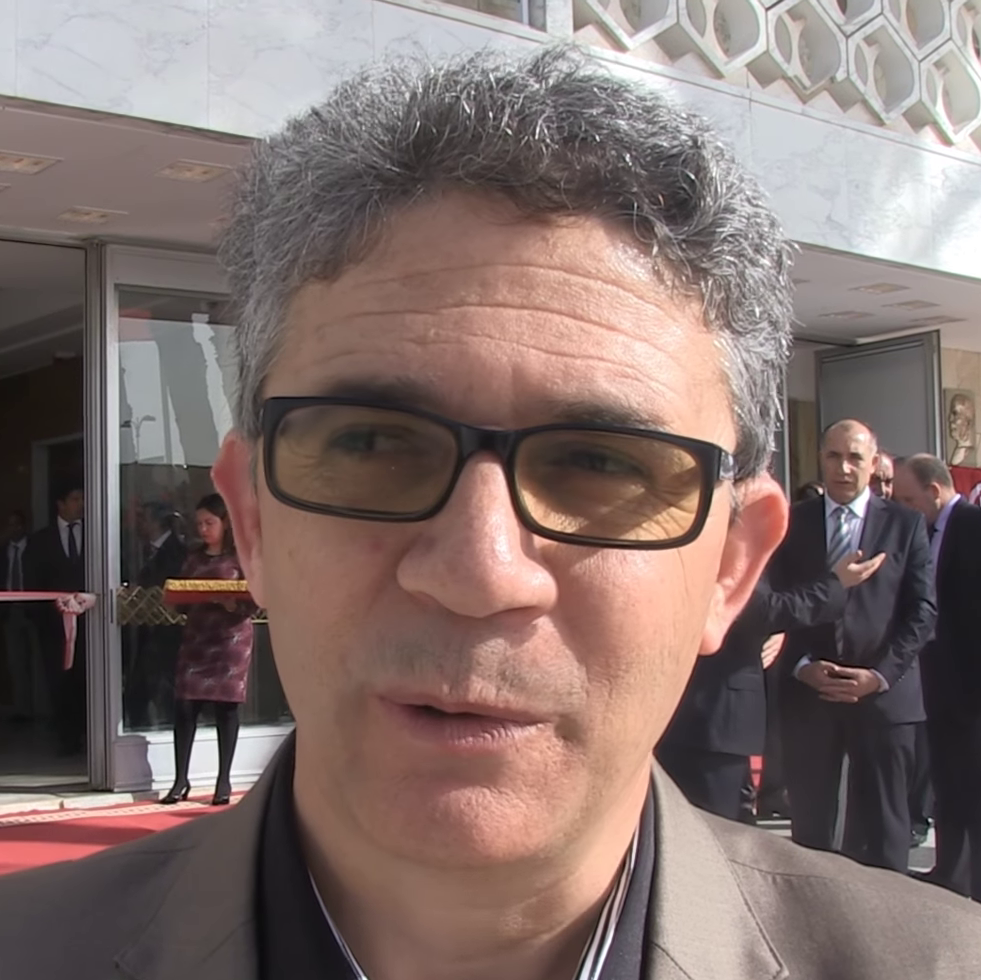

Chief of the cabinet of the President of the Tunisian Republic
- In office 30 April 2013 – 17 September 2014
- President: Moncef Marzouki
- Preceded by: Imed Daïmi
- Succeeded by: Mohamed Messaï

Personal details
- Born: 30 June 1966 (age 60) Menzel Kamel, Tunisia
- Party: Congress for the Republic
- Education: University of Sousse

Adnen Mansser (Arabic: عدنان منصر, born 30 June 1966) is a Tunisian author, historian, professor and politician. He is a lecturer in the department of Faculty of Arts and Humanities at the University of Sousse. Furthermore, he was the chief of the cabinet and the official spokesperson of the President of the Tunisian Republic Moncef Marzouki between the 30 April 2013 and 17 September 2014.

Mansser is the founder of the Maghreb Center for Strategic Studies. He is also a researcher at the Higher Institute of the History of the National Mouvement, member of the Scientific Counsil at The Faculty of Letters, a member of the Human Sciences of Sousse, and a member of Higher Authority for Realization of the Objectives of the Revolution, Political Reform and Democratic Transition.

== Qualifications ==
- He holds a master's degree in history and geography from the École Normale Supérieure de Sousse in June 1989.
- In September 1990 he received a certificate in historical research, and in September 1991 received a distinction in history at the Faculty of Humanities and Social Sciences of Tunis University.
- In May 2005 he received a university qualification file, at the Faculty of Arts and Humanities of the University of Sousse.

== Political life ==
After the Tunisian revolution, he was selected as a member of the Higher Authority for Realisation of the Objectives of the Revolution, Political Reform and Democratic Transition and served his term from 15 March 2011 to June 2011. Afterwards he became a candidate in the Tunisian Constituent Assembly election on 23 October 2011.
He was an adviser and chief of the cabinet of the President of the Tunisian Republic Moncef Marzouki and his official spokesman between 30 April 2013 and 17 September 2014.

== Works ==
- Armed resistance in Tunisia (1881–1939) Part 1, 1997, Higher Institute of the history of the National Movement Publications (with Amira Aleya Sagheer).
- Armed resistance in Tunisia (1939–1956) Part 2, 2004, Higher Institute of the history of the National Movement Publications (with Amira Aleya Sagheer).
- Domination strategy: the French Protectorate and the Tunisian State Institutions, 2003, Faculty of Arts and Humanities of Sousse Publications.
- Bourguiba's State 1956–1970, 2004.
- Durr and metal (Arabic: الدر ومعدنه), 2010.
- Season of Migration to the Dignity, 2011.
