= National Engineering School of Tunis =

Academic institution in Tunisia

Coordinates: 36.8314°N 10.1472°E

- المدرسة الوطنية للمهندسين بتونس
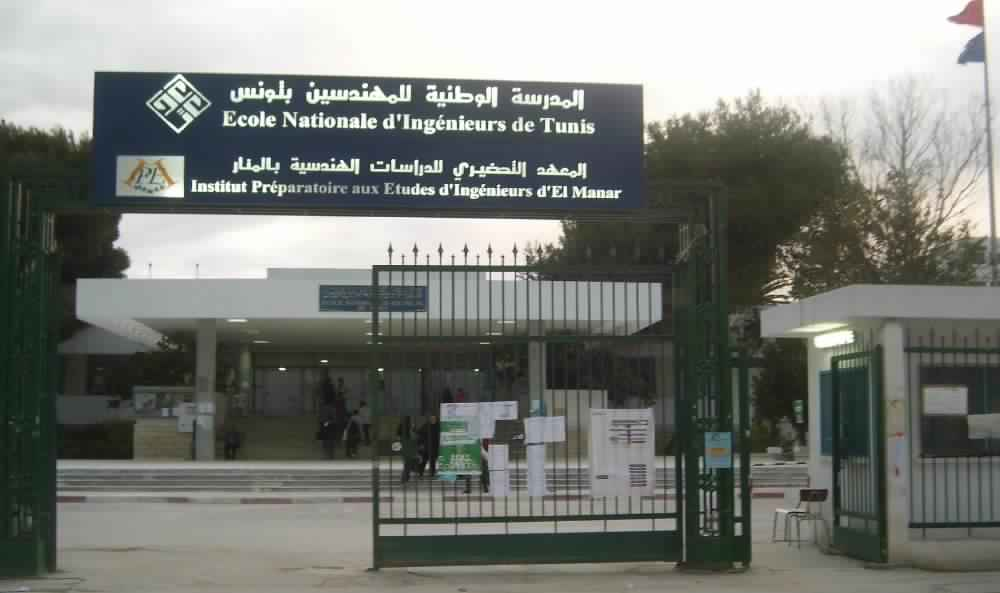
- ENIT entrance
- Type: Public
- Established: 1968
- Founders: Mokhtar Latiri
- Director: Hatem Jenzri
- Location: Tunis, Tunisia
- Campus: University of Tunis El Manar
- Language: Arabic, French, English
- Website: www.enit.rnu.tn

The National Engineering School of Tunis (Arabic: المدرسة الوطنية للمهندسين بتونس), or ENIT, is the oldest engineering school in the country after the National Agronomic Institute of Tunisia (1898). Part of the Tunis El Manar University, it is located at the El Manar campus in Tunis.

== Establishment ==
The National Engineering School of Tunis was founded by Mokhtar Latiri on December 31, 1968.

== Departments ==
ENIT has six independent departments:

- Industrial engineering
- Mechanical engineering
- Civil engineering
- Electrical engineering
- Information and communication technology
- Applied mathematics

Each department offers different masters and doctorates and has its own research laboratories.

== See also ==
- Mediterranean Institute of Technology
- National Engineering School of Monastir
- National Engineering School of Bizerte
- National Engineering School of Sousse
- National Engineering School of Sfax
- National Engineering School of Gabès
- National Engineering School of Gafsa
- National Engineering School of Carthage
- University of Tunis El Manar
