= Sfax Preparatory Engineering Institute =

- المعهد التحضيري للدراسات الهندسية بصفاقس
- Type: Public
- Established: 1992
- Director: Mr Mounir Kchaou
- Location: Sfax, Tunisia; 34°44′13.3″N 10°44′54.3″E
- Language: Arabic French English
- Website: www.ipeis.rnu.tn
- Location within Tunisia

The Sfax Preparatory Engineering Institute (Arabic: المعهد التّحضيري للدّراسات الهندسيّة بصفاقس) or IPEIS, is a Tunisian university establishment created according to the law N°65 on July 7, 1992. It is part of the University of Sfax.

== Mission ==
IPEIS prepares students for the national entrance exam to engineering schools (French: Concours national d'entrée aux écoles d'ingénieurs).

The institute deals with the implementation of pilot stations in the city of Sfax, the exchange of practices adaptable to local conditions, the carrying out of agronomic experimental analyzes and technical-economic and results processing for dissemination beyond the city.

In 2017 IPEIS got the highest passing score in the national entrance exam in Tunisia; the success rate of the institute was 91.82%.

== Community life ==
According to the website access statistics in national institutions and facilities in Tunisia, IPEIS ranks fourth.

In 2020. the institute organized the tenth annual session of table tennis under the supervision of the regional commission for youth and sports. This season is the first nationally of its kind with the participation of all national institutions.

== Departments ==
The Sfax Preparatory Engineering Institute has four independent departments.

- Mathematics and physics (MP)
- Physics and chemistry (PC)
- Biology and geology (PB)
- Technology (PT)

== Notable students ==
- Imed Ammar

== See also ==
- Tunis Preparatory Engineering Institute
- Preparatory Institute for Engineering Studies of Nabeul
- El Manar Preparatory Engineering Institute
- Monastir Preparatory Engineering Institute
