= Latifa Habachi =

Tunisian lawyer and politician (born 1972)

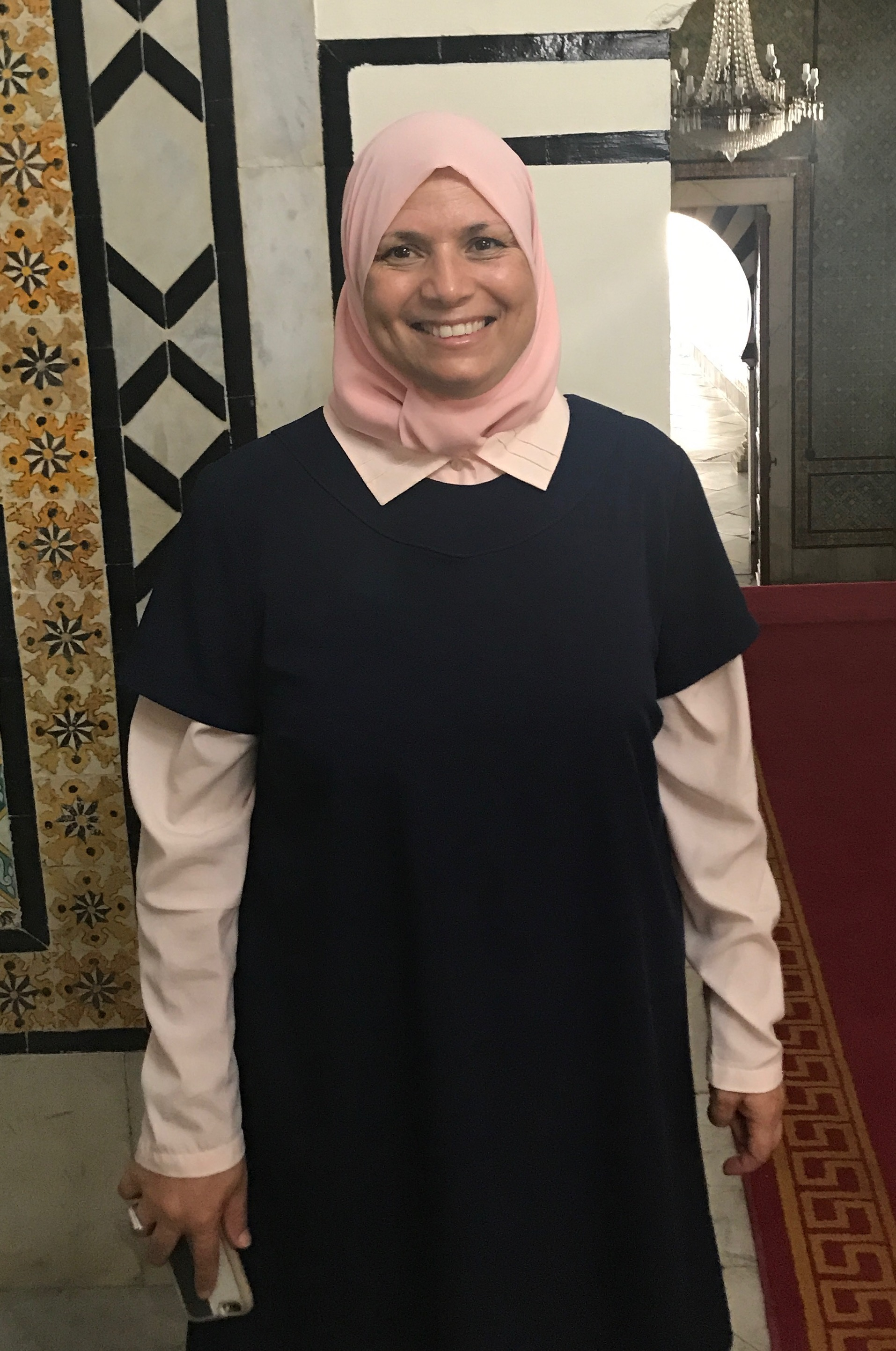

Personal details
- Born: 13 August 1972 (age 54) Tunis, Tunisia
- Party: Ennahda
- Education: Tunis El Manar University
- Occupation: Lawyer

Latifa Habachi (born 13 August 1972) is a Tunisian lawyer and politician who is a member of the Assembly of the Representatives of the People.

== Early life and education ==
Habachi was born on 13 August 1972 in Tunis to a family of twelve children. She attended secondary school at Omrane Superior. She has a master's degree and diploma in legal sciences from the Faculty of Law in Tunis.

== Career ==
Habachi began working as a lawyer in 1995. She is Vice President of the Tunisian Association of Young Lawyers and has volunteered on political trials. She participated in a demonstration of lawyers after the self-immolation of Mohamed Bouazizi. On 31 December 2010, she was abducted by militia while in court.

Habachi became a member of the Islamist movement while at university. In 2011, she was elected as a member of the Constituent Assembly of Tunisia to represent the Ennahda movement for the constituency of Manouba. She helped draft the 2014 Constitution.

Habachi was reappointed in the Assembly of the Representatives of the People in 2014, one of 42 female members. In 2014, Habachi and Sana Mersni proposed an amendment to the constitution to give the government power to nominate members of the judiciary. It was strongly opposed by Popular Front and Democratic Bloc opposition members and led to a call from the Tunisian Judges' Syndicate for strikes, but was accepted by 109 votes. Habachi is the vice-chair of the Committee on General Legislation.

In 2016, Habachi participated in an international coalition of women called "The Women's Boat for Gaza", seeking an end to the blockade of the Gaza Strip.

== Personal life ==
Habachi is married and has three sons. She began wearing the veil at age sixteen, but stopped for a number of years after she was banned from working and her husband nearly imprisoned.
