= Hamza Khadhraoui =

Tunisian footballer (born 1999)

Personal information
- Full name: Hamza Khadhraoui
- Date of birth: 16 January 1999 (age 27)
- Place of birth: Tunisia
- Height: 1.76 m (5 ft 9 in)
- Position: Left winger

Team information
- Current team: Club Africain
- Number: 7

Youth career
- –2018: Stade Tunisien

Senior career*
Years	Team	Apps	(Gls)
2018–2024	Stade Tunisien	73	(13)
2020–2021	→ US Monastir (loan)	5	(0)
2024–	Club Africain	65	(7)

International career^{‡}
2024–	Tunisia	2	(0)
- * Club domestic league appearances and goals as of 30 October 2026 ‡ National team caps and goals as of 30 October 2026

Hamza Khadhraoui (Arabic: حمزة الخضراوي; born 16 January 1999) is a Tunisian professional footballer who plays as a left winger for Tunisian Ligue Professionnelle 1 club Club Africain and the Tunisia national football team.

== Club career ==
=== Stade Tunisien ===
A product of the Stade Tunisien youth academy, Khadhraoui made his senior debut for the club in 2018. During the 2020–21 season, he joined fellow Tunisian Ligue Professionnelle 1 side US Monastir on loan, making five official appearances before returning to Stade Tunisien. During the 2023–24 campaign, he played a key role in helping Stade Tunisien win the 2023–24 Tunisian Cup.

=== Club Africain ===
On 19 July 2024, Khadhraoui officially signed a three-year contract with Club Africain. He quickly established himself as a regular starter on the left wing under the club's technical staff. During the 2025–26 season, he won the Tunisian Ligue Professionnelle 1 title with Club Africain, continuing as a key offensive contributor into the 2026–27 domestic and CAF Champions League campaigns.

== International career ==
Khadhraoui received his first call-up to the Tunisia national football team on 5 September 2024 for the 2025 Africa Cup of Nations qualification matches against Madagascar. In March 2025, newly appointed head coach Sami Trabelsi named Khadhraoui in Tunisia's squad for the 2026 FIFA World Cup qualification fixtures.

== Honours ==
Stade Tunisien

- Tunisian Cup: 2023–24

Club Africain

- Tunisian Ligue Professionnelle 1: 2025–26
