= University of Jendouba =

University in Jendouba, Tunisia

- Type: Public
- Established: 2003
- Chancellor: Pr Mohamed Abaza
- Faculty: Faculty of Sciences
- Students: 14,956
- Location: Jendouba, Tunisia; 36.5115°N 8.7581°E
- Website: www.uj.rnu.tn

The University of Jendouba (Arabic: جامعة جندوبة) is a public university in Jendouba, Tunisia. The university is oriented primarily toward sciences and information technology.

== Campuses ==
The university has a campus in Jendouba.

== See also ==
- List of schools in Tunisia
- List of universities in Tunisia
