= Yaël Nazé =

Belgian astrophysicist and author

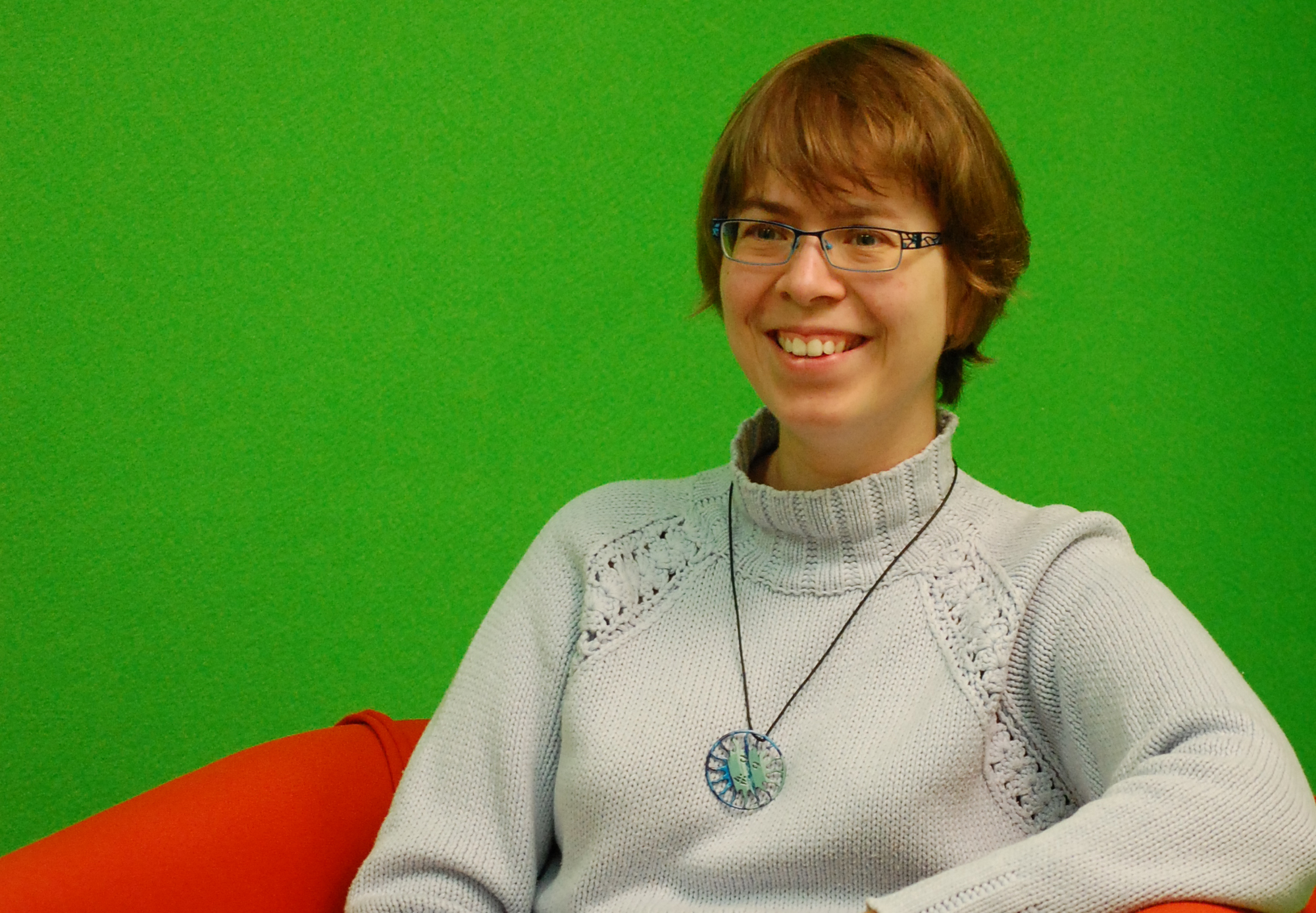
- Yaël Nazé at "L’Espace des sciences" on 16 October 2012
- Born: 1976 (age 49–50); Baudour, Belgium
- Education: Faculty of Engineering of UMons, University of Liège
- Known for: Research about massive stars
- Spouse: Gregor Rauw
- Awards: Jean Perrin Prize, Stroobant Biennial Prize, Roberval Prize, Europlanet Prize for Excellence in Public Engagement with Planetary Science
- Scientific career
- Fields: Astronomy, astrophysics
- Workplaces: University of Liège, National Fund for Scientific Research
- Thesis: (2004)

Yaël Nazé is a Belgian astrophysicist, author and professor at the University of Liège. She specializes in massive stars and their interactions with their surroundings. In her research, she has worked with images and data collected from various space telescopes and has worked on creating new observation satellites.

Nazé is also engaged in outreach to educate the general public about space, notably planetary science. She has written several books and articles that connect astronomy to other aspects of human culture, such as archaeology and art (painting, music). Her efforts in science communication as well as research have been recognized with awards by several organizations.

== Early life and education ==
Yaël Nazé was born in Baudour, Belgium in 1976. By the age of 10, she knew that she wanted she wanted to become an astrophysicist after observing constellations from her home in Borinage and reading about the astronomy in the newspapers. Early in her last year of secondary school, Nazé wrote a letter to astrophysicist Jean-Marie Vreux to "find out what...to study to become an astronomer." He became her teacher and mentor.

Nazé completed a degree in electrical engineering at the Faculté polytechnique de Mons [Faculty of Engineering of UMons] in 1999 and received her PhD in Astrophysics from the University of Liège in March 2004.

== Career ==
At the astrophysics center of the University of Liège, Yaël Nazé engages in research to create new observation satellites and "analyses data from different international observatories.

She particularly focuses on massive stars, which start their life as objects with spectral types O and B, and then evolve notably as Wolf-Rayet stars or Luminous Blue Variables. Her work aims at constraining the properties of these stars, notably their strong stellar winds. Her work was publicized through several press releases.

For example, she led or collaborated to several studies examining the X-ray emission of Zeta Puppis, one of the nearest massive stars to Earth. In 2013, she analyzed XMM-Newton data "spread over a decade to study variability in the X-ray emission." The project confirmed "the winds from massive stars are not simply a uniform breeze,..., but also reveal hundreds of thousands of individual hot and cool pieces." Collaborating with You-Hua Chu, she also identified wind-blown bubbles in the Magellanic Clouds and also characterized ultra-hot nebulae ionized by extreme Wolf-Rayet stars.

Using various X-ray telescopes, she pinpointed the high-energy properties of several classes of massive stars, such as magnetic massive stars, Be stars, evolved massive stars, or massive binaries in which the stellar winds collide. As an example of the latter category, in 2007, she and her colleagues used data collected between 2000 and 2005 from the XMM-Newton observatory and the Chandra X-ray Observatory to "discovered the collision of winds in" the massive system HD 5980 – it was the first extragalactic case securely identified. They examined the binary star again in 2016 and were surprised to find that it "was two and a half times brighter than a decade earlier, and its X-ray emission was even more energetic." The team could understand this surprising observation thanks to a changing cooling regime, a new one having been proposed theoretically just before. The hypothesis is that "when stellar winds collide, the shocked material releases plenty of X-rays. However, if the hot matter radiates too much light, it rapidly cools, the shock becomes unstable and the X-ray emission dims. But by 2016, the shock had relaxed and the instabilities had diminished, allowing the X-ray emission to rise eventually." In the same way, in 2011, Nazé led the team that used data from the XMM-Newton observatory and the Neil Gehrels Swift Observatory to examine the X-ray emissions produced by collisions of stellar winds in the Cyg OB2 No. 9 binary star system in the "Cygnus star-forming region". Among Be stars, she has particularly focused her work on Gamma Cas and its analogs, in which an ultra-hot plasma emit bright and hard X-rays: in 2026, she pinpointed the origin of this emission to accretion onto a white dwarf companion of the Be star.

Since October 2019, Yaël Nazé has been a permanent Senior Research Associate at the National Fund for Scientific Research (FNRS) researcher.

In her role as a professor at the University of Liège, Nazé has taught general physics and astronomy courses, as well as advanced astrophysics such as spectroscopy and astrobiology. She has also taught multidisciplinary courses on the "evolution of ideas in astronomy, critical reasoning, science communication." She considers the most important thing about teaching to be passing our knowledge onto the next generation. She aims to make her classes fun and interactive.

== Community outreach ==
Yaël Nazé shares her knowledge not only in academic settings, but also "gives public lectures during which she hopes to see stars in the eyes of her audience." In 2012, Nazé was awarded the Prize for Excellence in Public Engagement with Planetary Science by the Europlanet Society for her "outreach activities...in attracting hard to reach audiences", which includes "children, artists and elderly people." In the 15 years leading up to that honor, "[s]he has been particularly active in highlighting the contribution of women to astronomy and showing opportunities for girls looking at careers in astronomy."

To further the general public's engagement with information about the cosmos, Yaël Nazé, "together with a colleague, pioneered a service for journalists giving daily summaries of space news translated into French." To interest children in astronomy, "[s]he designed a permanent exhibition on the Solar System for the pediatric ward of the Bruyères Hospital in Belgium as well as booklets, hands-on activities, and serious games published by the science diffusion office of the university of Liège (Réjouisciences).

== Publications ==
In addition to authoring and co-authoring over 200 academic papers in refereed journals, Yaël Nazé has written 14 general interest books (as of May 2025) "that brilliantly demonstrate the role of astronomy in our history and culture." Her book L'astronomie des anciens [The astronomy of the ancients], "which won the Jean Rostand Prize for the best work of popular science in the French language in 2009", draws a connection between astronomy and archaeology. In her book Art & astronomie: impressions célestes [Art & Astronomy: celestial impressions], she juxtaposes art and astronomy with observations such as "Pollock...wanted to make the trajectories of stars visible." Using a play on words for the title, Cahier de (G)astronomie: la cuisine du cosmos [(G)astronomy notebook: the cuisine of the cosmos] is "a cookbook inspired by the planets, which includes a recipe for Io pizza."

In 2018, in an effort to combat pseudoscience, Yaël Nazé wrote an article for Skeptical Inquirer in which she analyzed the controversy over a PhD thesis proposed by a student at the University of Sfax, which defended a flat earth as well as a geocentric model of the Solar System and Young Earth creationism. The dissertation theme had been approved by the committee overseeing environmental studies theses (but not the final, full dissertation) and its summary had been made public and denounced in 2017 by professor Hafedh Ateb, a co-founder of the Tunisian Astronomical Society, on his Facebook page.

In 2023 in response to NASA scientists mapping the colors of the images from the James Webb Space Telescope (JWST) "to different pitches of sound", Yaël Nazé wrote an article about "the long love story between music and astronomy." She traced the history of music in astronomy beginning with the Ancient Greek beliefs that "each planet hung on a sphere, which...revolved around the Earth" and that those "moving spheres in the cosmos should also produce sounds" to Johannes Kepler's "conclusion that planets sung melodies" which he later "abandoned...to concentrate on spelling out his third law on planetary motion in 1619." In modern times, Nazé explains, sounds are mapped to colors produced by celestial objects: "a brighter object produce a louder sound" and "a sound's duration corresponds to the object's appearance: short for a star..., long for a nebulous cloud.

=== Additional selected works ===
- Les couleurs de l'Univers [The colors of the Universe] (2005)
- L'astronomie au féminin [The feminine side of astronomy] (2006)
- Histoire du télescope, la contemplation de l'Univers des premiers instruments aux actuelles machines célestes [History of the telescope : contemplation of the universe from the first instruments to current celestial machines] (2009)
- Voyager dans l'espace [Travel in space] (2013)
- Astronomie de l'étrange [Astronomy of the strange] (2021)

== Awards ==
- Jean Perrin Prize from the French Physical Society "rewarding outreach activities" (2017)
- Stroobant Biennial Prize from the Royal Academy of Belgium "rewarding astrophysics research in 2015–2016" (2017)
- Roberval Prize "for an outstanding outreach book on technology" for her book Voyager dans l'espace [Travel in Space] (2014)
- Europlanet Prize for Excellence in Public Engagement with Planetary Science" (2012)
- Burgen Scholarship from the Academy of Europe (2010)
- Jean Rostand Prize "for her book L'astronomie des anciens [The astronomy of the ancients] (2009)
- The Jean Teghem Prize "by the CEP-ULB for outstanding outreach activities performed by a researcher." (2009)
- Verdickt-Rijdams Prize from the Royal Academy of French Language and Literature of Belgium and the Marie Popelin Prize/Woman of the Year from the Belgian Council of French-Speaking Women" for her book L'astronomie au féminin [The feminine side of astronomy] (2007)
