= Baudour =

Village in southwest Belgium

Coordinates: 50°29′00″N 3°49′54″E

Baudour (French pronunciation: [boduʁ]) is a village of Wallonia and a district of the municipality of Saint-Ghislain. It is located in the province of Hainaut, Belgium, at an average altitude of 53 meters above the sea level. As of 2022, the village had a population of 6,049.

== Notable inhabitants ==
- Astrophysicist Yaël Nazé
- Playwright, librettist and novelist Henri Delmotte
- Politician Michel Daerden

== Gallery ==
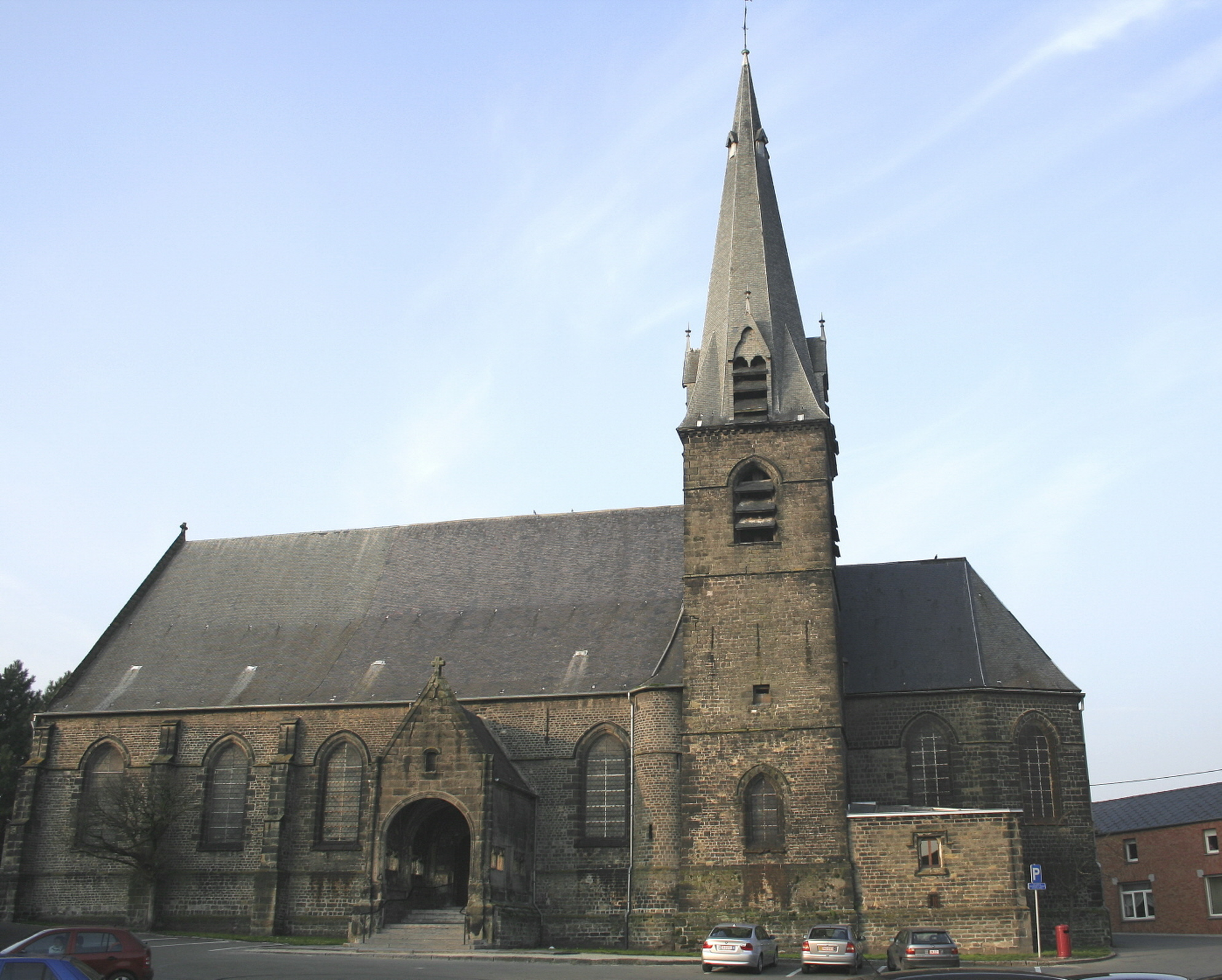
Baudour, Church St-Géry (15th/16th centuries).
