= Afwa Thameur =

Tunisian plant biologist and agronomist

- عفوا ثامر
- Born: c. 1982 (age 43–44)
- Citizenship: Tunisia
- Occupation: Research scientist
- Known for: Research into drought tolerance in cereal crops in Tunisia

Academic background
- Education: Tunis El Manar University; University of Szeged

Afwa Thameur (Arabic: عفوا ثامر; born c. 1982) is a Tunisian plant biologist and agronomist who specialises in drought tolerance in cereal crops. She holds is a Fellow of the Arab Women Leaders in Agriculture initiative.

== Career ==
Thameur studied for a PhD in Biology at Tunis El Manar University, graduating in 2012, aged thirty. Her post-doctoral research took place at Szeged University in Hungary. In 2015, Thameur was awarded a Fulbright scholarship to study in the US. This scholarship enabled her to work at the US Department of Agriculture in Texas and Mississippi. Her research project was titled "Enhancement of Bioactive Compound Production in Chinaberry, Melia azadirach, and Monk's Pepper, Vitex agnus castus". From 2016 to 2019, she worked with Walid Sadok of the University of Minnesota on a partnership programme funded by the International Centre for Biosaline Agriculture (ICBA) and CRDF Global to enhance and stabilise wheat production in Tunisia. In 2019, she joined the first fellowship cohort of the Arab Women Leaders in Agriculture initiative. As of 2020, she was a research scientist at the Ministry of Agriculture (IRESA) and Assistant Professor at the University of Gabes.
