= Tunisia Polytechnic School =

Ecole Polytechnique de Tunisie
- المدرسة التونسية للتقنيات
- Type: Engineering School
- Established: 1991
- Principal: Lilia El Amraoui
- Administrative staff: 140
- Students: 150
- Location: La Marsa, Tunisia; 36°52′48″N 10°20′24″E
- Campus: University of Carthage
- Website: ept.rnu.tn
- Location in Tunisia

Ecole Polytechnique de Tunisie (EPT), (Arabic: المدرسة التونسية للتقنيات al-madrasa at-tounisia lit-takniat, French: L'École polytechnique de Tunisie or EPT) is a Tunisian Engineering School. It was founded on June 26, 1991 by order of law N°91-42, and welcomed its first students in September 1994.

The school is under the sole supervision of the University of Carthage and recruits from a pool of top ranking students from the national engineering school entrance exam. The majority of students belong to the Preparatory Institute for Scientific and Technical Studies.

== Admission ==
EPT selects only fifty students each academic year from a pool of approximately 4000 students that passed the Tunisian engineering school entrance exam: 30 are selected from MP (Math-Physics) major, 10 are selected from the PC (Physics-Chemistry) major and 10 are selected from T (Technology) major. Admitted students receive three years of multidisciplinary engineering curriculum.

== See also ==
- University of Carthage
