= Chahrazed Helal =

Tunisian singer

Chahrazed Helal شهرزاد هلال
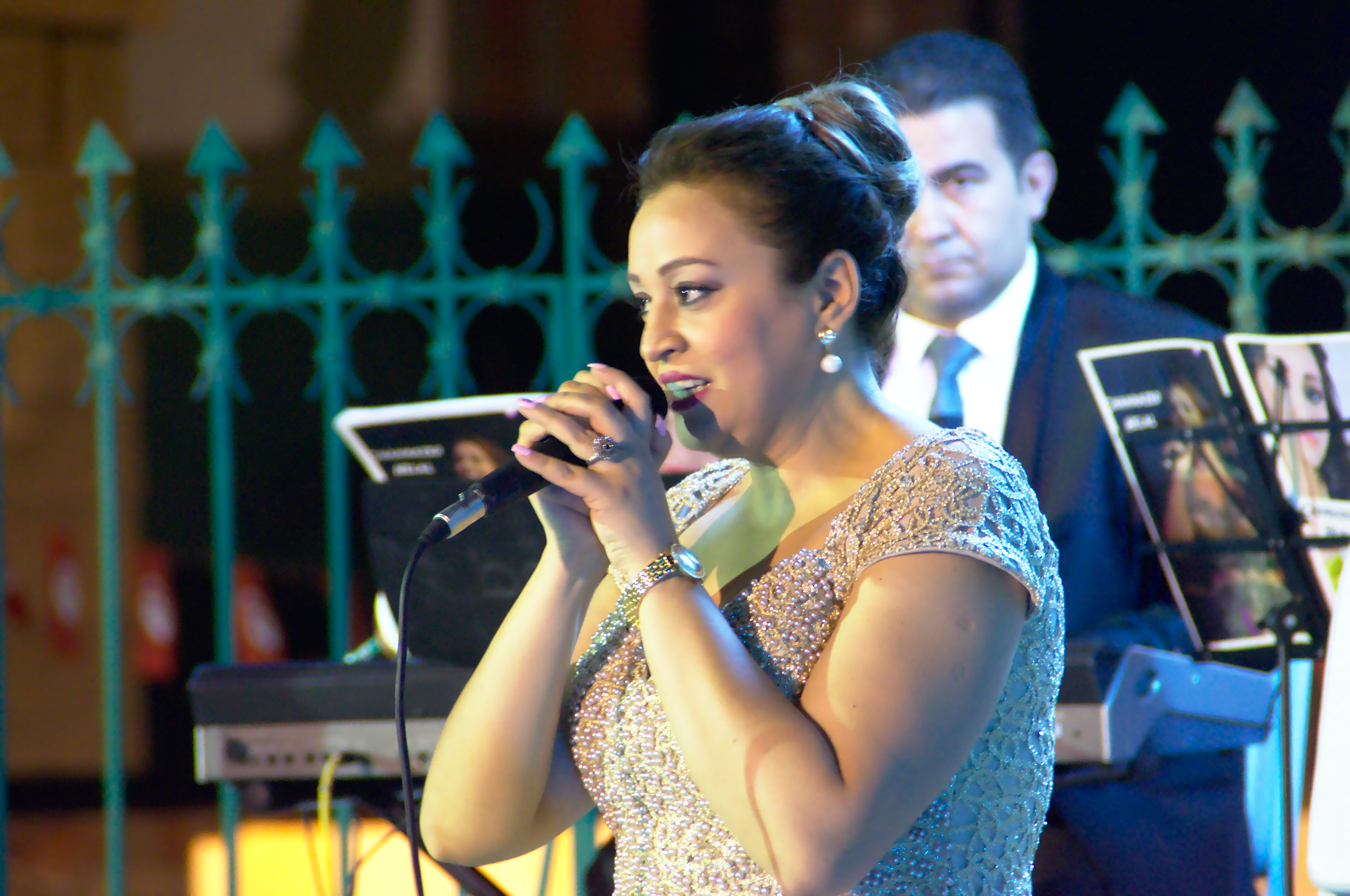
- Chahrazed Helal on stage in 2017.

Background information
- Origin: Tunisian
- Occupations: Singer, composer
- Website: www.chahrazedhelal.com

Chahrazed Helal (Arabic: شهرزاد هلال) is a Tunisian singer who performs principally in the Arabic language. She also teaches music at Tunis University's Higher Institute of Music (Institut supérieur de musique). Over the past 20 years, Helal has not only appeared at the Carthage Music Festivals but has performed at many international events. Considered to be one of Tunisia's finest singers, she has received a variety of awards, including best female singer at the 2010 and 2013 Arab Music Festivals.

== Biography ==
After seven years of study at the Institut Supérieur de Musique in Tunis, in 1999 Chahrazed Helal received a diploma in Arab music. Continuing her studies, in 2003 she earned a master's degree in History of Music and Musicology. In 2012, with a thesis under the direction of the musicologist Nicolas Meeùs on "La création musicale entre tradition et modernité: approche analytique du répertoire de Mohammed 'Abd al-Wahhâb", she received a doctorate from Paris-Sorbonne University.

Since she embarked on her singing career in the late 1990s, Helal has appeared in Arab music events and concerts in Tunisia and abroad. These have included performances at the Arab World Institute in Paris (1998), the Cairo Arab Music Festival (1998) and the International Festival of Carthage (2003, 2007, 2010). In 2011, she sang in Greece, accompanied by the Thessaloniki Symphony Orchestra. In 2014, she received acclaim for her performance at the Hammemet Festival in Tunisia. She has also performed in Hamburg, Germany (2017).

On 13 August 2018, Helal starred in a concert at the international music festival in Hammamet, where she performed songs in the Sufi and Bedouin traditions in connection with celebrations honouring Tusisian women. She also sang some of her own compositions.

Chahrazed Helal has also made a number of recordings including "Narou zadat" (single, 2010), Law Tensa (album, 2011), Tarabiyyat (album, 2012), "Ya Hmama" (single, 2014), "Ech Mazel" (single, 2015), "Bledi l'Aziza" (single, 2015) "Lik Amana" (single, 2016) and Yamma (single, 2017).

On 12 January 2019, Helal released a new music video "Ala Bab Allah" written and composed by herself.
