= Henri Delmotte =

Belgian playwright, librettist and novelist

- Born: Henri Philibert Joseph Delmotte; 14 March 1822; Baudour, Province of Hainaut, United Kingdom of the Netherlands
- Died: 10 July 1884 (aged 62); Brussels, Province of Brabant, Belgium
- Occupations: novelist, poet

Henri Philibert Joseph Delmotte (14 March 1822 – 10 July 1884) was a Belgian playwright, librettist and novelist. Delmotte was born in Baudour, Hainaut and studied law at the Université libre de Bruxelles, graduating in 1845. He entered public service in the Ministry of the Interior, and served as commissioner of the arrondissement in Nivelles from 1849 to 1859. He worked to establish a French-language national theatre in Belgium and from 1879 to 1880 wrote handbills and highly polemic newspaper articles. Beside numerous magazine articles, Delmotte also published books and comedies, in which he describes the contemporary Belgian middle classes. Delmotte died at Brussels in 1884.

== Works ==
- Monsieur Du Bois, ou Nouvelle noblesse, 3-act prose comedy performed in Brussels at the Royal Park Theatre on 15 March 1845 and La Monnaie on 18 March 1845.
- Comédies: M. Du Bois ou la nouvelle Noblesse. Le Début. Comment on dovint Conseiller. Le Lanceur d'Affaires. Paris: Sandoz & Fischbacher, 1873.
