= Mahmoud el Materi University =

Private university in Tunisia

Coordinates: 36.81615°N 10.18491°E

- جامعة محمود الماطري
- Type: Private
- Established: 2000
- President: Anissa el Materi Hached
- Location: Tunis, Tunisia
- Campus: Urban (Montplaisir, Lafayette and Cité Mahrajène)
- Language: French and Arabic
- Website: www.umm-tunisie.com

Mahmoud el Materi University (UMM) (Arabic: جامعة محمود الماطري) is a private Tunisian university located in Tunis, accredited by the State of Tunisia, which specializes in health studies.

It holds the name of doctor Mahmoud El Materi. His daughter, Anissa El Materi Hached, is the founding president of the university.

== History ==
In 2000, Anissa El Materi Hached established the Mahmoud el Materi Institute for nursing (professional education). In 2007, The institute was renamed to Mahmoud el Materi University (UMM). At that time, the university only provided a nursing bachelor's program. In 2009, the university started a diversification initiative and launched a physiotherapy bachelor program, then an anesthesiology bachelor program in 2010, midwifery in 2011, nutrition in 2013 and geriatric care in 2015.

In 2015, Mahmoud el Materi University also received an habilitation for the athletic coaching professional master's program. It became operational in 2017.

Mahmoud el Materi University disclosed on June 5, 2017 its new visual identity. This new visual identity is bilingual, presenting an interlacing between the French and Arabic initial letters of the university, which symbolizes an exchange of cultures and knowledge. The new logo is a blend between pure and modern shapes and a traditional calligraphy, presenting a combination between tradition and innovation, which is realized by the university through the introduction of high-definition medical simulation in its programs and the launching of a center for pedagogical support and innovation. With a logo which does not contain health symbols anymore, Mahmoud el Materi University translates in images its ambition to propose other subjects than heath programs.

== Degrees ==
- Bachelor in anesthesiology
- Bachelor in geriatric care
- Bachelor in midwifery
- Bachelor in physiotherapy
- Bachelor in human nutrition
- Bachelor in nursing
- Master in athletic coaching

== Center for pedagogical support and innovation ==
Mahmoud el Materi University launched in 2017 the first center for pedagogical support and innovation in Tunisia.

The center for pedagogical support and innovation of Mahmoud el Materi University aims to contribute to the improvement of the university academic education quality, either theoretical and during the internships, and the design of innovative pedagogical frameworks and tools. The center trains, advises and supports the teachers, trainers and internship supervisors of the university.
