= Concours nationaux d'entrée aux cycles de formation d'ingénieurs =

Engineering examination in Tunisia

The Concours Nationaux d'Entrée aux Cycles de Formation d'Ingénieurs is a national entrance examination for admission to graduate training for engineers in Tunisia. Admission to engineering schools is based on these exams.

Successful candidates are allowed to enroll at one of Tunisia's engineering schools. The exams are written and generally taken by students of preparatory classes (classes préparatoires scientifiques et technologiques).
