= ISET Charguia =

Academic institution in Tunisia

Higher Institute of Technological Education of Charguia
- Institut Supérieur des Études Technologiques de Charguia
- Director: Nadia Jeddi
- Location: Charguia, Tunisia; 36°51′05″N 10°12′41″E
- Website: www.isetch.rnu.tn
- Location within Tunisia

The Institut Supérieur des Études Technologiques de Charguia (Higher Institute of Technological Studies of Charguia), commonly abbreviated ISET Charguia or ISETch, was created by virtue of Decree no. 2000-981, dated 11 May 2000. It falls under the General Direction of Technological Studies of the Ministry of Higher Education.

It comprises two departments: information technology and business administration.
