= Bilel Aït Malek =

French footballer (born 1996)

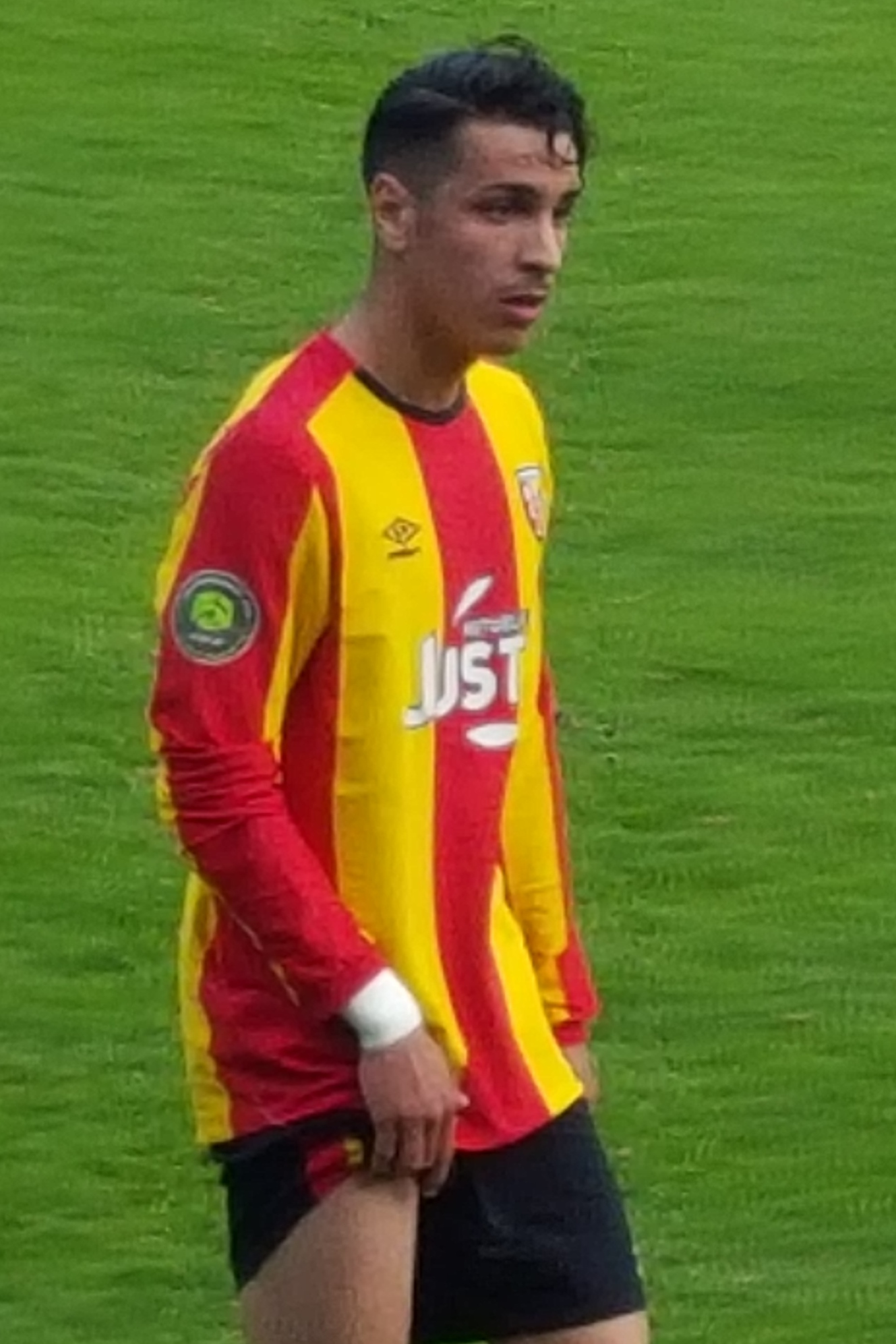
- Aït Malek with Lens B in 2016

Personal information
- Full name: Bilel Mehdi Aït Malek-Sassi
- Date of birth: 19 August 1996 (age 30)
- Place of birth: Saint-Denis, France
- Height: 1.74 m (5 ft 9 in)
- Position: Midfielder

Team information
- Current team: Club Africain

Senior career*
| Years | Team | Apps | (Gls) |
| 2013–2016 | Lens II | 50 | (9) |
| 2017–2018 | Tarbes | 13 | (3) |
| 2018 | Vereya | 13 | (0) |
| 2019 | Sportul Snagov | 1 | (0) |
| 2019–2020 | Stade Tunisien | 3 | (0) |
| 2024– | Club Africain | 13 | (4) |

International career^{‡}
| 2024– | Tunisia | 1 | (0) |
- * Club domestic league appearances and goals as of 14:57, 10 October 2019 (UTC) ‡ National team caps and goals as of 22:00, 11 October 2024 (UTC)

Bilel Mehdi Aït Malek-Sassi (born 19 August 1996) is a professional footballer who plays as a midfielder for Club Africain. Born in France, he plays for the Tunisia national team.

== Career ==
=== Vereya ===
On 1 August 2018, Malek signed a contract with Bulgarian club FC Vereya.

=== Sportul Snagov ===
On 20 February 2019, Bilel signed a contract with the Romanian Liga II leader, CS Sportul Snagov.
