= Industrial data processing =

Industrial data processing is a branch of applied computer science that covers the area of design and programming of computerized systems which are not computers as such — often referred to as embedded systems (PLCs, automated systems, intelligent instruments, etc.). The products concerned contain at least one microprocessor or microcontroller, as well as couplers (for I/O).

Another current definition of industrial data processing is that it concerns those computer programs whose variables in some way represent physical quantities; for example the temperature and pressure of a tank, the position of a robot arm, etc.

== History ==
Industrial data processing emerged in the mid-20th century with the introduction of programmable logic controllers (PLCs) and supervisory control and data acquisition (SCADA) systems. These technologies allowed industrial operators to monitor and control machinery using digital inputs and outputs.

During the 1970s and 1980s, the integration of computer numerical control (CNC) systems and distributed control systems (DCS) advanced the field, allowing greater automation and data handling at scale. The proliferation of sensors and industrial networks laid the groundwork for Industry 4.0, where cloud computing, edge processing, and artificial intelligence are increasingly embedded in industrial environments.

== Components ==
Data Acquisition Industrial data is collected from sensors, actuators, control systems, and machines via analog and digital signals. These data streams can include temperature, pressure, vibration, speed, voltage, and other process variables.

Real-Time Processing Systems such as edge computing devices, microcontrollers, and industrial PCs process data locally to minimize latency and increase reliability. Pre-processing functions may include filtering, anomaly detection, and logic-based event handling.

Storage and Archiving Data historians and time-series databases store large volumes of chronological data. These archives are essential for long-term performance monitoring, regulatory compliance, root cause analysis, and predictive maintenance.

Communication Protocols Industrial data processing relies on communication protocols such as Modbus, OPC-UA, PROFIBUS, and MQTT to transmit data between field devices, control systems, and enterprise applications.

Data Analysis and Decision Support Advanced analytics platforms use statistical models, artificial intelligence, and machine learning to analyse datasets in real time or retrospectively. Applications include condition-based monitoring, process optimization, automated quality assurance, and digital twin modelling.

== Applications ==
Industrial data processing is central to:

- Smart manufacturing and Industry 4.0
- Predictive maintenance and asset management
- Industrial energy efficiency and monitoring
- Robotics and motion control
- Infrastructure management (e.g., utilities, transportation, oil & gas)
- Logistics and supply chain automation

== Notable Contributors ==
A number of influential figures from around the world have shaped the development of industrial data processing, spanning disciplines such as control theory, computing, robotics, and network architecture.

- Konrad Zuse (Germany) designed and built the first programmable digital computer (Z3), laying the groundwork for industrial computing systems.
- Sophie Wilson (United Kingdom) developed the instruction set for the ARM processor, widely used in embedded and industrial control devices.
- Fei-Fei Li (China/USA) advanced computer vision and AI systems now used in industrial inspection, robotics, and quality control.
- Lotfi Zadeh (Azerbaijan/Iran/USA) introduced fuzzy logic, which became a cornerstone of modern control systems in industrial automation.
- Qian Xuesen (China) was a key figure in Chinese aerospace and control theory, contributing to early cybernetic systems relevant to industrial applications.
- Ndubuisi Ekekwe (Nigeria) developed microelectronics systems and automation solutions adapted to African manufacturing and infrastructure contexts.
- Margaret Hamilton (USA) pioneered real-time embedded systems and introduced concepts of software fault-tolerance, which influenced industrial automation frameworks.
- Barbara Liskov (USA) contributed principles of modular design and data abstraction, critical in developing reliable control software.
- Dennis Ritchie (USA) co-created the C programming language, used extensively in low-level industrial programming and firmware.
- Radia Perlman (USA) invented the Spanning Tree Protocol, essential for ensuring redundancy and robustness in industrial Ethernet networks.
- Joseph Engelberger (USA) helped commercialize industrial robotics, promoting the integration of sensors and control data into automated systems.
- John G. Ziegler and Nathaniel B. Nichols (USA) created the Ziegler–Nichols method for PID control loop tuning, a staple in process industries.
- Jay Forrester (USA) developed system dynamics models and early digital control architectures foundational to industrial feedback systems.
- Maria Klawe (Canada/USA) championed access and inclusion in computing and engineering, helping diversify the global workforce driving industrial technologies.
- Miriam Posner (USA) critiques bias and inequity in data infrastructures, offering insight into how industrial systems can better reflect human-centered values.

== See also ==
- Industrial automation
- SCADA
- PLC
- Industry 4.0
- Real-time computing
- Time-series database
- Digital twin
- Machine vision
