= University of Sousse =

Public university in Sousse, Tunisia

- Université de Sousse جامعة سوسة
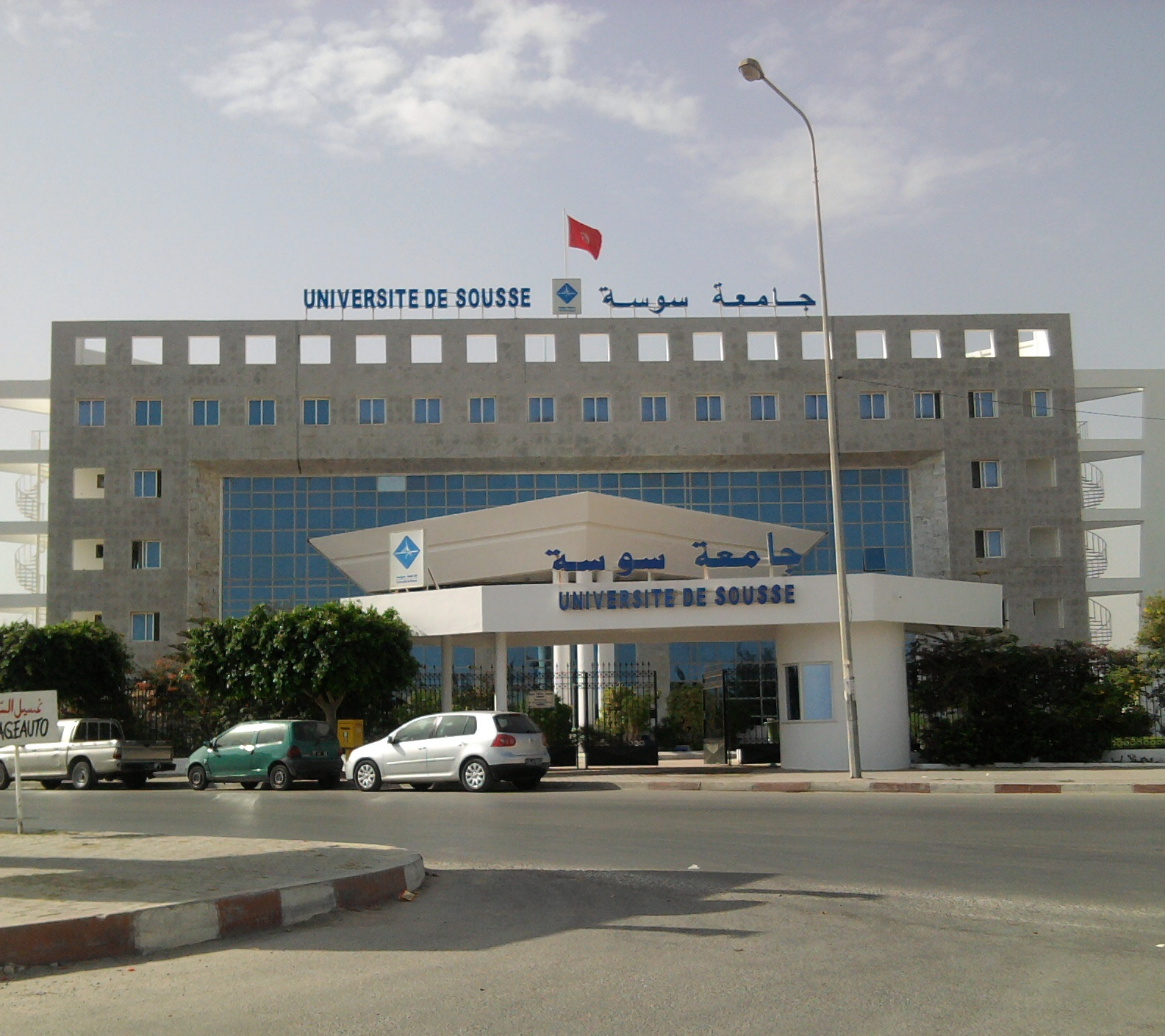
- Former name: University of the Center
- Type: Public
- Established: 2004
- Affiliations: Association of Francophone Universities; Mediterranean Universities Union; THETYS, University of the Mediterranean; Group Compostela of the Universities
- President: Pr Fayçal Mansouri
- Rector: Prof. Ahmed Nourreddine Helal
- Location: Sousse, Tunisia; 35.8348°N 10.6276°E
- Location within Tunisia

University rankings

Global – Overall
- QS World: 1001–1200 (2024)
- THE World: 1201–1500 (2024)
- USNWR Global: =1476 (2023)

The University of Sousse (French: Université de Sousse, Arabic: جامعة سوسة) is a public university in Sousse, Tunisia.

== History ==
The University of Sousse was created in 2004 from a division of the University of the Center, which had been created in 1991 from the University of Monastir. The University of the Center had grown rapidly from 45,000 students in 2001-2002 to nearly 60,000 in 2003–2004 in 30 institutions. In 2004 new universities were created in Monastir, Kairouan and Gafsa.

== Organisation and administration ==
The Rector is Professor Ahmed Nourreddine Helal.

== Alumni ==
- Samir Dilou, Minister of human rights, transitional justice and government spokesperson under Prime Minister Hamadi Jebali since 20 December 2011.
- Adnen Mansser, historian and professor
