= University of Gafsa =

University in Gafsa, Tunisia

- Type: Public
- Established: July 2004
- Chancellor: Pr El Imem Aloui
- Faculty: Faculty of sciences
- Students: 22500
- Location: Gafsa, Tunisia; 34.42227°N 8.74698°E
- Website: Official website

The University of Gafsa (Arabic: جامعة قفصة) is a public university located in Gafsa, Tunisia. The university is oriented primarily toward sciences and information technology

== Organization ==
- National Engineering School of Gafsa
- Higher Institute of Technological Studies of Tozeur
- Higher Institute of Applied Studies in Humanities of Tozeur

== See also ==
- List of schools in Tunisia
- List of universities in Tunisia
