= Fatma Chamakh-Haddad =

Tunisian professor, philosopher, feminist and activist

- Born: 10 March 1936; Tunis
- Died: 2 May 2013

Fatma Chamakh-Haddad or Fatma Haddad-Chamakh (born 10 March 1936 in Tunis; died 2 May 2013) was a professor, philosopher, feminist and Tunisian activist.

== Early life and education ==
Born in 1936 in Tunis, Fatma Chamakh-Haddad came from a family of Muslim and nationalist intellectuals. She was educated as a child in Tunis, notably in the Russian high school. As a teenager, she became a member of the Neo Destour (the New Constitutional Liberal Party) and the General Union of Tunisian Students (UGET). She then went to university in Paris, where she joined her brothers.

In 1955, she began studying philosophy, anthropology, and English language and civilization at the Sorbonne University in Paris. In 1961, she was accepted into the competition of agrégation of philosophy. She later got her PhD by presenting in 1977, in Paris, a thesis titled Philosophie systématique et système de philosophie politique chez Spinoza [Systematic Philosophy and System of Political Philosophy by Spinoza], developed under the direction of Paul Ricœur (the thesis was published in Tunis in 1980). During her studies in Paris, she became vice-president of the UGET and a member of the local group of Néo Destour.

== Career ==
After her agrégation, Chamakh-Haddad returned to Tunisia. She taught first in secondary education and at the National School of Assistant Professors before joining Tunis University in 1967. She was assistant from 1967 to 1968, master assistant from 1968 to 1977, master lecturer from 1977 to 1982, professor of higher education in the history of modern philosophy at the Department of Philosophy in the Faculty of Arts and Humanities of Tunis in 1982, then professor emeritus. Chamakh-Haddad worked and published on human rights and women's rights, on political philosophy, as well as in the field of bioethics (particularly interested in the issues of suffering and pain) as a member of the Tunisian National Committee for Medical Ethics.

As a specialist on Baruch Spinoza, she held in particular the separation of the political and theological, and a method to analyse the problems of modern civilization, as well as the Arab-Muslim world.

From 1966, she also became a member of the central committee of the National Union of Tunisian Women (UNFT). She then participated in the work of the Center for Research, Studies, Documentation and Information on Women and the Association of Tunisian Women for Development Research (AFTURD), organizations related to the cause of women. The UNFT was close to the institutions of power and represented at the time what has been called a "state feminism" put forward by the government (the Socialist Destourian Party) of Tunisia, the AFTURD being more independent of government control. Chamakh-Haddad participated and lead seminars and academic symposia on the theme of the cause of women. Taking advantage of the interest of the Tunisian rulers for this subject, she participated in the creation, at the Higher Institute of Human Sciences of Tunis (the Ibn Charaf Institute), of a professional master of women's studies, a new initiative within the Tunisian university. It is to this master's degree that she devoted the last years of her academic activity.

She died on May 2, 2013.
