= Club Africain =

Tunisian professional football club based in Tunis

- Full name: Club Africain
- Nicknames: El Ghalia (The Beloved); Al-Afriqi (The African)
- Short name: CA
- Founded: 4 October 1920; 106 years ago
- Ground: Hammadi Agrebi Stadium
- Capacity: 65,000
- Chairman: Mohsen Trabelsi
- Manager: Maher Kanzari
- League: Tunisian Ligue Professionnelle 1
- 2024–25: 3rd
Home colours	Away colours	Third colours

Club Africain (Arabic: النادي الإفريقي), commonly known as CA, is a Tunisian professional football club based in Tunis. Founded on 4 October 1920, the club competes in the Tunisian Ligue Professionnelle 1, the top tier of Tunisian football. The club plays its home matches at the Hammadi Agrebi Stadium in Radès, which has a seating capacity of 65,000.

In 1991, Club Africain became the first Tunisian club to win the African Cup of Champions Clubs (now the CAF Champions League).

== History ==
=== Foundation and early years (1920–1955) ===
Club Africain was founded on 4 October 1920 in the Bab jdid neighborhood of Tunis. The club was established as a continuation of Stade Africain, a local sporting association active between 1915 and 1918. During the French protectorate era, the club's founders established an identity centered on national heritage, selecting red and white as the primary club colours and ensuring an all-Tunisian management board.

The club earned promotion to Tunisia's top division in 1937 and won its first national league titles in back-to-back seasons (1946–47 and 1947–48).

=== Domestic success and African glory (1960–1990s) ===
Following Tunisian independence, the club entered a golden era during the 1960s under Italian manager Fabio Roccheggiani, winning domestic titles and setting defensive benchmarks in the league. In 1971, Club Africain became the first Tunisian side to claim an international trophy by winning the Maghreb Cup Winners Cup.

The crowning achievement in the club's history occurred in 1991. Managed by Romanian coach Ilie Balaci, Club Africain captured the 1991 African Cup of Champions Clubs, defeating Villa SC of Uganda 7–3 on aggregate in the final. The club completed a quadruple during the 1991–92 season by winning the domestic league, national cup, African Champions League, and the Afro-Asian Club Championship against Al-Hilal of Saudi Arabia.

=== Recent history (2000s–present) ===
In the 21st century, Club Africain added further domestic honours, including league titles in 2007–08 and 2014–15, as well as back-to-back Tunisian Cup victories in 2017 and 2018.

== Stadium ==
For decades, Club Africain hosted matches at the historic Stade El Menzah in Tunis. Since 2001, primary home matches for domestic and continental competitions have been hosted at the 65,000-capacity Hammadi Agrebi Stadium in Radès. The club's training ground and youth academy complex, known as Parc A, is situated near the Lake of Tunis.

== Supporters and rivalries ==
=== Tunis Derby ===
The club shares a historic cross-town rivalry with Espérance Sportive de Tunis. The match between the two teams is known as the Tunis derby, representing one of North Africa's most prominent football fixtures.

=== Classic Rivalries ===
Club Africain maintains long-standing domestic rivalries with Étoile Sportive du Sahel and CS Sfaxien, forming part of the traditional "Big Four" in Tunisian football.

== Crest and colours ==
Since its founding in 1920, the club has played in red and white vertical stripes, representing the national colours of Tunisia.

=== Kit manufacturers and shirt sponsors ===
Period	Manufacturer	Sponsor	Ref.
1998–1999	(Italy) Diadora	(Tunisia) Boga / (South Korea) Samsung	
1999–2001	(Italy) Diadora	(United States) Coca-Cola / (South Korea) Samsung	
2002–2011	(Italy) Diadora	(United States) Coca-Cola / (United States) Ford	
2011–2013	(Italy) Legea	(Tunisia) Boga	
2013–2014	(Tunisia) In-House	(Qatar) Ooredoo	
2014–2020	(England) Umbro	(Qatar) Ooredoo	
2020–	(England) Umbro	Ooredoo / Qatar Airways	

== Honours ==
Type	Competition	Titles	Winning Seasons
Domestic	Tunisian Ligue Professionnelle 1	14	1946–47, 1947–48, 1963–64, 1966–67, 1972–73, 1973–74, 1978–79, 1979–80, 1989–90, 1991–92, 1995–96, 2007–08, 2014–15, 2025–26
Domestic	Tunisian Cup	13	1964–65, 1966–67, 1967–68, 1968–69, 1969–70, 1971–72, 1972–73, 1975–76, 1991–92, 1997–98, 1999–2000, 2016–17, 2017–18
Domestic	Tunisian Super Cup	3	1968, 1970, 1979
Continental	African Cup of Champions Clubs	1	1991
Regional	Arab Cup Winners' Cup	1	1995
Regional	Arab Champions League	1	1997
Regional	North African Cup of Champions	2	2008, 2010
Regional	Maghreb Cup Winners Cup	1	1971
Regional	Maghreb Champions Cup	3	1974, 1975, 1976
Intercontinental	Afro-Asian Club Championship	1	1992

== Current squad ==
As of 27 September 2026

Note: Flags indicate national team as defined under FIFA eligibility rules; some limited exceptions apply. Players may hold more than one non-FIFA nationality.

No.	Pos.	Nation	Player
1	GK	TUN	Mouhib Chamakh
3	DF	TUN	Ghassen Mahersi
4	DF	TUN	Yassine Bouabid
6	DF	TUN	Ammar Abdelhak
7	FW	TUN	Hamza Khadhraoui
8	MF	BFA	Alain Kanté
10	MF	TUN	Mohamed Sadok
11	FW	TUN	Oussama Bouguerra
15	DF	CMR	Wills Nkingne
16	GK	TUN	Ghaith Yeferni
17	DF	TUN	Ghaith Zaalouni
18	FW	COD	Phillippe Kinzumbi
19	MF	TUN	Bassem Srarfi
20	MF	TUN	Haykeul Chikhaoui
21	FW	TUN	Bilel Aït Malek

No.	Pos.	Nation	Player
22	GK	TUN	Malek Saada
24	DF	TUN	Houssem Romdhane
25	MF	CMR	Rayan Tetego
28	MF	GAM	Saidou Khan
29	DF	SEN	Mamadou Diatta
30	MF	TUN	Mootez Zaddem
31	FW	TUN	Aymen Harzi
32	MF	LBA	Osama Elsharimi
33	DF	TUN	Houssem Ben Ali
34	FW	CMR	Taddeus Nkeng
35	MF	TUN	Yahia Mtiri
36	DF	MLI	Ismaïla Simpara
39	MF	TUN	Youssef Mokhtari
40	FW	TUN	Sadok Kadida

== See also ==
- Club Africain (handball)
- Club Africain (basketball)
