= Phillippe Kinzumbi =

Congolese footballer (born 1999)

Philippe Kinzumbi
Personal information
- Full name: Phillippe Beni Kinzumbi
- Date of birth: 26 January 1999 (age 27)
- Place of birth: Lubumbashi, DR Congo
- Height: 1.82 m (6 ft 0 in)
- Position: Winger

Team information
- Current team: Club Africain

Senior career*
Years	Team	Apps	(Gls)
2019–2020	JS Groupe Bazano		
2020–2024	TP Mazembe		
2024–	Club Africain	37	(6)

International career^{‡}
2022–2023	DR Congo	6	(2)
- * Club domestic league appearances and goals as of 1 July 2026 ‡ National team caps and goals as of 4 June 2025

Phillippe Beni Kinzumbi (born 26 January 1999) is a Congolese footballer who plays as a winger for Club Africain.

Kinzumbi joined TP Mazembe in 2020 from JS Groupe Bazano. He played in continental competition, for instance in the 2023–24 CAF Champions League knockout stage, when he scored in the quarter-final against Petro de Luanda to put TP Mazembe through. Kinzumbi also had the assist to the only goal in the group stage match against Mamelodi Sundowns which TP Mazembe also won.

He made his international debut in the 2022 African Nations Championship qualification, scoring against Chad.

In 2022 Kinzumbi was accused by his club fo staying too long on a national team training camp, whereas he accused his club of applying undue pressure in prolonging his contract.

In the summer of 2024, contract disagreements rose again. First, Kinzumbi travelled to Morocco to sign for Raja CA. Moroccan media reported that the transfer was finalized. TP Mazembe claimed that Kinzumbi was only in Morocco on vacation and that he was not a free agent. Said a TP Mazembe spokesperson, "If Kinzumbi does not return, he knows what he is facing". In August 2024, then, it was reported that Kinzumbi instead went to Tunisia and signed a three-year contract with Club Africain. In contrast to the earlier "transfer", training had now commenced in TP Mazembe with the team preparing for the 2024–25 Linafoot.
