= Mouhib Chamakh =

Tunisian footballer (born 2001)

Personal information
- Full name: Mouhib Chamakh
- Date of birth: 25 August 2001 (age 25)
- Place of birth: Medenine, Tunisia
- Height: 1.92 m (6 ft 4 in)
- Position: Goalkeeper

Team information
- Current team: Club Africain
- Number: 1

Youth career
- CO Médenine

Senior career*
Years	Team	Apps	(Gls)
2017–2022	CO Médenine		
2022–2025	ES Métlaoui	49	(0)
2025–	Club Africain	25	(0)

International career^{‡}
2026–	Tunisia	1	(0)
- * Club domestic league appearances and goals as of 23:23, 15 May 2026 (UTC) ‡ National team caps and goals as of 23:23, 15 May 2026 (UTC)

Abdelmouhib Chamakh (Arabic: مهيب الشامخ; born 25 August 2001) is a Tunisian professional footballer who plays as a goalkeeper for Tunisian Ligue Professionnelle 1 club Club Africain and the Tunisia national team.

== Club career ==
Chamakh began his senior career with CO Médenine in 2017, as they were relegated to the Tunisian Ligue Professionnelle 2. In 2022, he transferred to ES Métlaoui in the Tunisian Ligue Professionnelle 1 and on 5 August 2023 extended his contract with them for 2 more season.And in 2026 he won his first trophy with club africain making it its first trophy he has ever won He played 53 matches in all competitions with ES Métlaoui. On 1 July 2025, he transferred to Club Africain on a contract until 2029. He helped Club Africain win the 2025–26 Tunisian Ligue Professionnelle 1 as the starting goalkeeper.

== International career ==
Chamakh made his official debut with the senior team in a 0–0 friendly tie with Canada on 31 March 2026. He made the final squad for the 2026 FIFA World Cup. In Tunisia's first match against Sweden, Chamakh played the full game, but was criticized by media for having made a series of errors which contributed to their loss.

== Honours ==
Club Africain

- Tunisian Ligue Professionnelle 1: 2025–26
