= Haykeul Chikhaoui =

French-born Tunisian footballer (born 1996)

Personal information
- Date of birth: 4 September 1996 (age 30)
- Place of birth: Marseille, France
- Height: 1.70 m (5 ft 7 in)
- Position: Midfielder

Youth career
- 2013–2014: Sochaux

Senior career*
Years	Team	Apps	(Gls)
2013–2016	Sochaux B	35	(5)
2014–2016	Sochaux	1	(0)
2016–2018	Porto B	17	(0)
2017	→ Varzim (loan)	7	(0)
2018–2021	Stade Tunisien	43	(2)
2021–2023	Monastir	52	(10)
2023–2025	Ajman	32	(4)
2025–2026	Al-Nasr	0	(0)

International career
2015	Tunisia U21	2	(0)
2023–	Tunisia	1	(0)
- * Club domestic league appearances and goals as of 20 July 2026

Haykeul Chikhaoui (born 4 September 1996) is a professional footballer who plays as a midfielder for the Tunisia national team.

Born in France, he has represented the Tunisia U21 national team at international level.

== Club career ==
Chikhaoui is a youth exponent from FC Sochaux-Montbéliard. He made his Ligue 2 debut with FC Sochaux-Montbéliard at 29 August 2014 against Dijon FCO.
