= Tunis El Manar University =

University in Tunis, Tunisia

University of Tunis El Manar
- Université de Tunis El Manar جامعة تونس المنار
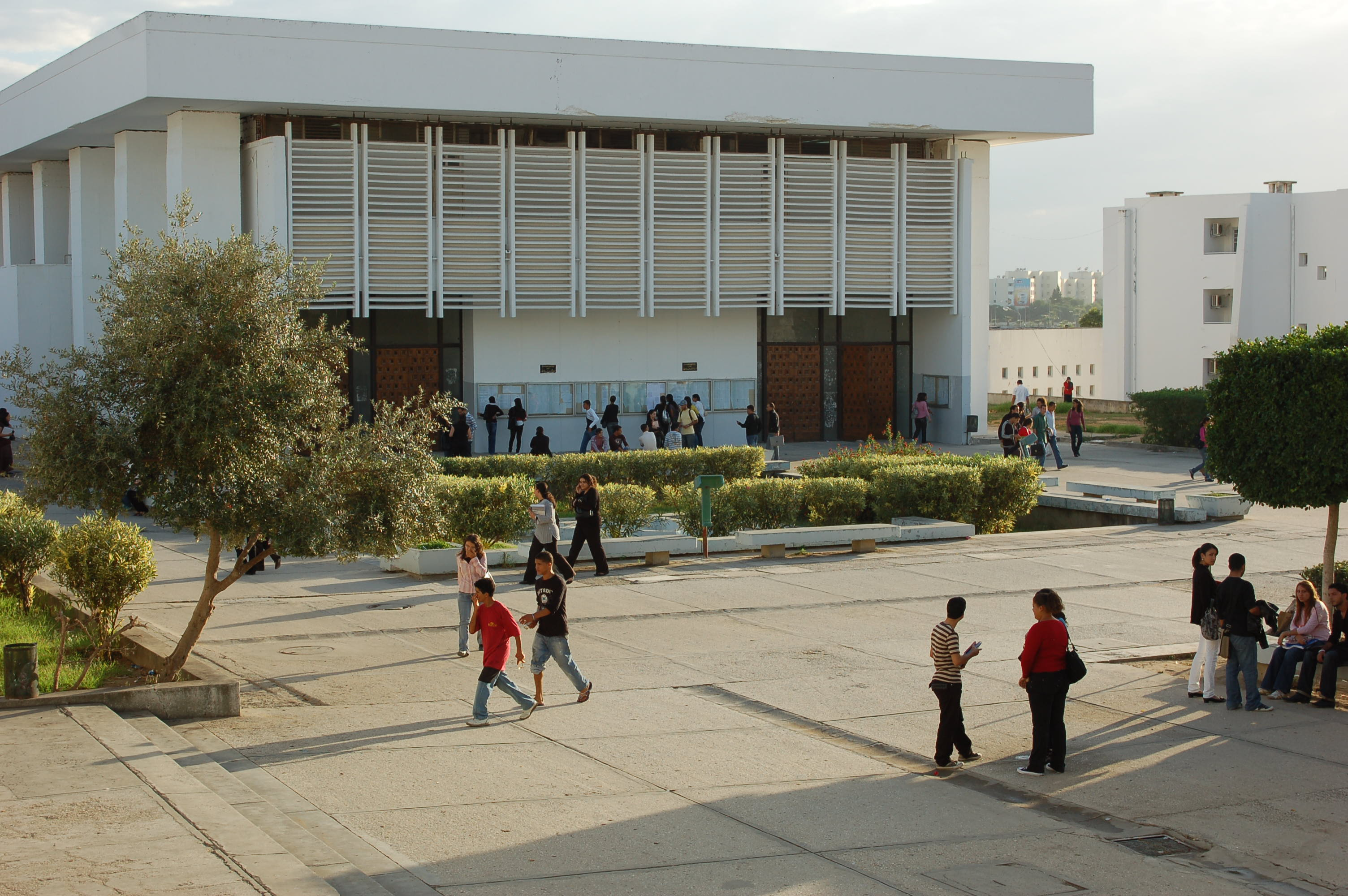
- Type: Public
- Established: 2000; 26 years ago
- Affiliations: UNIMED
- Faculty: 11
- Administrative staff: 2,500
- Students: 45,000
- Location: Tunis, Tunisia; 36.82922°N 10.14629°E
- Website: www.utm.rnu.tn

The University of Tunis El Manar (UTM, French: Université de Tunis El Manar, Arabic: جامعة تونس المنار) is a university located in Tunis, Tunisia. It was founded in 2000 and is organized in 11 Faculties.

== Ranking ==
University rankings

Global – Overall
- QS World: 951–1000 (2024)
- THE World: 801–1000 (2024)
- USNWR Global: =920 (2023)

According to URAP (University Ranking by Academic Performance) ranking of 2019–2020, it is the best university in Tunisia and the 613th university in the world.

The CEO of this university is Jihed Hafsi.

== Organization ==
These are the 11 faculties, schools and institute in which the university is divided into:

- Faculty of Law and Political Sciences
- Faculty of Medicine
- Faculty of Economic Sciences and Management
- Sciences' Faculty
- National Engineering School
- Bourguiba Institute of Modern Languages
- Preparatory Institute For Engineering Studies

== Alumni ==
- Afwa Thameur - agronomist and specialist in drought tolerance in crops.
- Semia Gharbi - environmentalist and Goldman Environmental Prize winner

== See also ==
- List of colleges and universities
- Tunis
