= Mediterranean Universities Union =

Organization of universities

UNIMED
- UNIMED - Mediterranean Universities Union
- Formation: 1991
- Headquarters: Rome, Italy
- President: Kherieh Rassas
- Website: www.uni-med.net

The Mediterranean Universities Union (Italian: Unione delle Università del Mediterraneo, UNIMED) consists of 162 universities from 25 countries of the Mediterranean basin (or that have a specific interest in the Mediterranean region). The association has its head office in Rome.

== Board ==
- President: Kherieh Rassas, Vice President for International and External Affairs, An-Najah National University (Palestine)
- Vice Presidents: Sapienza University of Rome (Italy), and Universitat de Barcelona (Spain)
- Secretary General: Hmaid Ben Aziza, former Rector of the University of Tunis (Tunisia)
- Honorary President: Wail Benjelloun, Former UNIMED President and Former President of Mohammed V University (Morocco)
