= University of Gabès =

University of Gabes
- Type: Public
- Established: July 2003
- Chancellor: Pr Mohamed Mars
- Vice-Chancellor: Younes Jadoui
- Students: 22500
- Location: Gabes, Tunisia; 33°51′12″N 10°06′07″E
- Website: univgb.rnu.tn

The University of Gabès (Arabic: جامعة قابس, French: Université de Gabès) is a public university located in southern Tunisia with its headquarters in Gabès.

== Campuses ==
The university has two main campuses in Gabès and another major one in the city of Medenine, south of Gabès.

=== Omar Khattab campus ===
The largest campus of the university is in a somewhat isolated southern part of the city near Erriadh suburb. Close to this campus is the largest sport complex in Gabès where some facilities are shared with the university. The campus is very close to the main road leading to the airport and tourist city of Matamata which is a favorite destination for students' weekend trips.

=== City Center campus ===
This campus is in downtown Gabès and hosts the University Cultural Center.

== Institutions ==
=== Faculties ===
- Faculty of Science: One of the largest in Tunisia and the largest in personnel after ENIG

=== Schools and institutes ===
- National Engineering School of Gabès (ENIG)
- Higher Institute of Computer Sciences and Multimedia
- Higher Institute of Applied Biology
- Higher Institute of Juridical Studies
- Higher Institute of Arts and Crafts
- Higher Institute of Management
- Higher Institute of Languages
- Higher Institute of Applied Sciences and Technology
- Higher Institute of Water Sciences and Technologies
- Higher Institute of Industrial Systems
- Higher Institute of Applied Studies in Humanities.

==== National Engineering School ====
The National Engineering School of Gabès (Arabic: المدرسة الوطنية للمهندسين بقابس) or ENIG, was founded in 1975. The school has five independent departments:

- Chemical Process Engineering
- Civil Engineering
- Electrical-Automatic Engineering
- Communications and Network Engineering
- Mechanical Engineering

=== Research institution ===
- Arid Zones Institute

== Academics ==
=== Degrees ===
The university offers the following degrees:

- Engineering (5 years)
- Maîtrise (4 years)
- Universitaire (3 years)
- Technicien Supérieur (2 to 3 years)

The university offers some postgraduate degrees:

- Master (6 years)
- PhD

== Notable staff ==
- Afwa Thameur – plant scientist

== See also ==
- List of schools in Tunisia
- List of universities in Tunisia
