= Tunis University =

Public university in Tunis, Tunisia

- جامعة تونس; Université de Tunis
- Type: Public
- Established: 1960
- Affiliations: UNIMED, Agence universitaire de la Francophonie
- Rector: Pr Slim Driss
- Administrative staff: 1,861
- Students: 28,000
- Location: Tunis, Tunisia
- Website: utunis.rnu.tn

Tunis University (Arabic: جامعة تونس, French: Université de Tunis) is a public university in Tunis, Tunisia. It was founded in 1960 on the basis of earlier educational establishments.

The University of Tunis is a member of the Mediterranean University Union (UNIMED) and of Agence universitaire de la Francophonie.

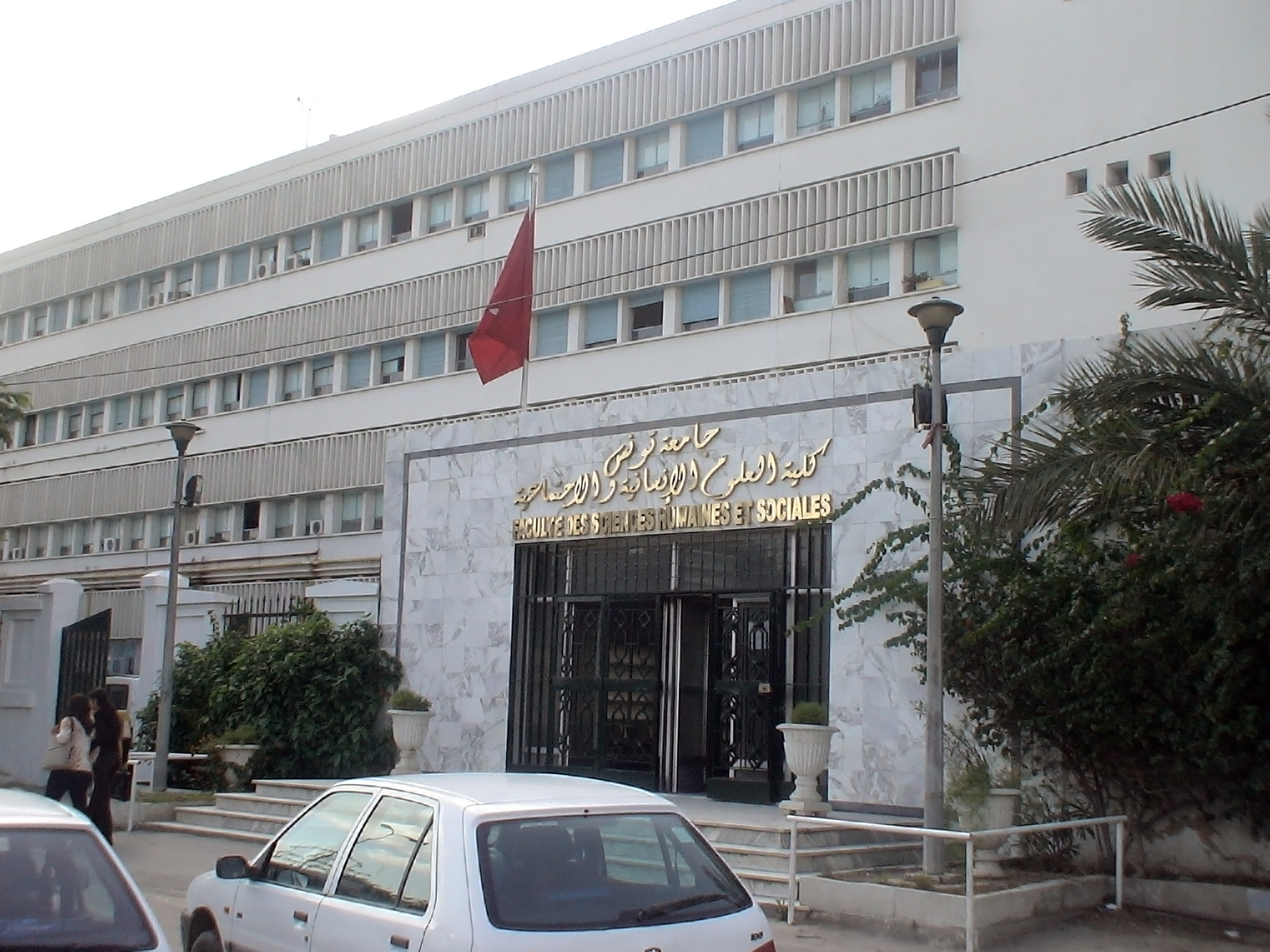
Faculty of Human and Social Sciences

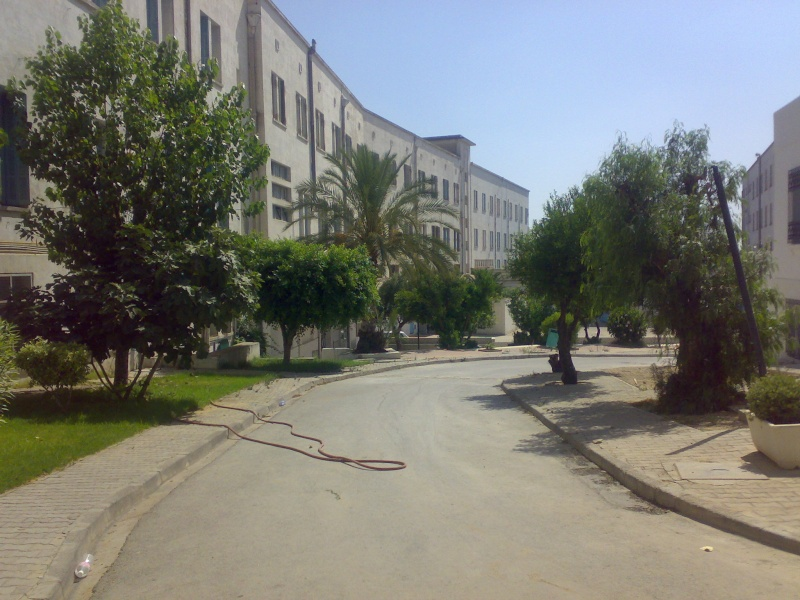
Preparatory Institute for Engineering Studies

== Organisation ==
The university is organised into the following institutions.

- Ecole Normale Supérieure (the oldest institute of the university)
- Higher School of Economic and Commercial Sciences
- Higher School of Technological Sciences
- Faculty of Human and Social Sciences
- Preparatory Engineering Institute
- Higher Institute of Literary Studies and Humanities
- Higher Institute of Dramatic Arts
- Higher Institute for Youth-Club Activities and Culture
- Higher Institute of Fine Arts
- Higher Institute of Applied Studies in Humanities
- Higher Institute of Applied Studies in Humanities of Zaghouan
- Higher Institute of Management
- Higher Institute of Music
- Higher Institute of Crafts Heritage
- Merian Centre for Advanced Studies in the Maghreb (MECAM)
- Tunis Business School
- National Heritage Institute (Co-Supervision with the Ministry of Culture and the Safeguard of the Heritage)

=== Preparatory Engineering Institute ===
The Tunis Preparatory Engineering Institute (Arabic: المعهد التّحضيري للدّراسات الهندسيّة بتونس) was created according to the law N°95-40 on 24 April 1995.

== Notable alumni and academics ==
- Hédi Annabi (4 September 1943 – 12 January 2010), a Tunisian diplomat and Special Representative of the United Nations Secretary-General
- Noureddine Bhiri (born 10 July 1958), Tunisian politician
- Mohamed Brahmi (15 May 1955 – 25 July 2013), Tunisian politician
- Fatma Chamakh-Haddad (10 March 1936 – 2 May 2013), professor, philosopher, feminist and activist
- Fadela Echebbi (born 23 January 1946), Tunisian author and poet
- Michel Foucault (15 October 1926 – 25 June 1984), French historian, philosopher, and literary critic
- Mohamed Ghannouchi (born 18 August 1941), the former Prime Minister of Tunisia and self-proclaimed acting president of the country for a few hours starting 14 January 2011
- Mohamed Ghozzi (born 24 February 1949 in Kairouan), Tunisian poet and critic
- Hamadi Jebali (born 12 January 1949), Prime Minister of Tunisia from December 2011 to March 2013
- Jeanne-Claude, (13 June 1943, Casablanca – 18 November 2009, New York City), environmental artist
- Thouraya Jeribi Khémiri (born 21 August 1960), Minister of Justice.
- Souhayr Belhassen (born 1943), human rights activist and journalist
- Sadok Chaabane (born 23 February 1950), University Professor
- Abdelfattah Mourou (born 1 June 1948), Politician and Lawyer
- Chahrazed Helal (born 1976), Singer & Musicologist
