= American Association of Oral and Maxillofacial Surgeons =

The American Association of Oral and Maxillofacial Surgeons (AAOMS) is the non-profit professional association serving the specialty of oral and maxillofacial surgery, the surgical arm of dentistry. Its headquarters are in Rosemont, Illinois.

== History ==
This organization was founded in 1918 by 29 dentists who specialized in extracting teeth. In 1919, the organization was initially named American Society of Exodontists and was formally recognized by American Dental Association. In 1921, the organization changed its name from American Society of Exodontists to the American Society of Oral Surgeons and Exodontists. During World War I, US did not have Dental Corps yet because of which lot of dentists volunteered for surgery with their medical colleagues. Lot of oral surgeons in the earlier part of 20th century had their medical degrees which allowed them to work with facial trauma in the World War I. Some of the early dentists who progressed the speciality in many different ways were Varaztad Kazanjian, Robert H. Ivy, Carl W. Waldron. Simon Hullihen and James Garretson are also known for their significant contributions to the field of oral surgery.

AAOMS created the Board of the American Society of Oral Surgeons in 1946. The name of this board was then changed to American Board of Oral and Maxillofacial Surgery (ABOMS) in 1978. The speciality then changed its name to American Association of Oral and Maxillofacial Surgeons (AAOMS) from American Society of Oral Surgeons and Exodontists in 1978.

AAOMS also played a key role in creating the first American edition of Journal of Oral and Maxillofacial Surgery in 1943. AAOMS created this journal with help of ADA. The journal was first called Journal of Oral Surgery. This journal was purchased by AAOMS from ADA IN 1981 to gain more control. Another journal called Oral Surgery, Oral Medicine, Oral Pathology, and Oral Radiology also has been publishing articles related to oral surgery since 1948.

== Present ==
AAOMS currently has an affiliation base of more than 9,000 fellows, members and residents in the United States, as well as 250 affiliate members from nations around the world. More than 90 percent of oral and maxillofacial surgeons in the United States belong to AAOMS. In addition to its membership, AAOMS has state component societies in each of the 50 states, the District of Columbia and the Commonwealth of Puerto Rico, and eight regional component societies.

AAOMS publishes the Journal of Oral and Maxillofacial Surgery and conducts the Daniel M. Laskin Award for an Outstanding Predoctoral Educator.
