= Faculty of Dental Medicine of Monastir =

Coordinates: 35°45′52.85″N 10°49′43.33″E

- كلية طب الأسنان بالمنستير
- Type: Public (National)
- Established: 14 November 1975
- Academic affiliations: University of Monastir
- Dean: Pr. Mohamed Salah Khalfi
- Students: 1516
- Location: Avenue Avicenne, Monastir, Tunisia
- Campus: Urban
- Language: French
- Website: http://www.fmdm.rnu.tn/

The Faculty of Dental Medicine of Monastir (FMDM) (Arabic: كلية طب الأسنان بالمنستير) is a dental school in Monastir, Tunisia. It is the first school to be established within the University of Monastir, and it is the only institution for dental studies in the country.

The faculty is under the dual supervision of the Ministry of Higher Education and Scientific Research and the Ministry of Public Health.

Dental studies in Tunisia are reserved for a selection of the elites of high school students who have passed their baccalaureate, hence the fact that admission is exclusive to scientific branches having the highest score nationally.

== History ==
=== Foundation ===
Before the inauguration of the faculty of dentistry of Monastir and until the beginning of the 1980s, Tunisian dentists studied in foreign universities, mainly in France.

The university was founded by law n ° 75–71 of 14 November 1975, and it has been part of the University of Monastir since 2004.

The inauguration of the faculties of dentistry and pharmacy took place on 20 November 1975 in the presence of President Habib Bourguiba.

The first promotion, counting only 46 students, graduated in 1982.

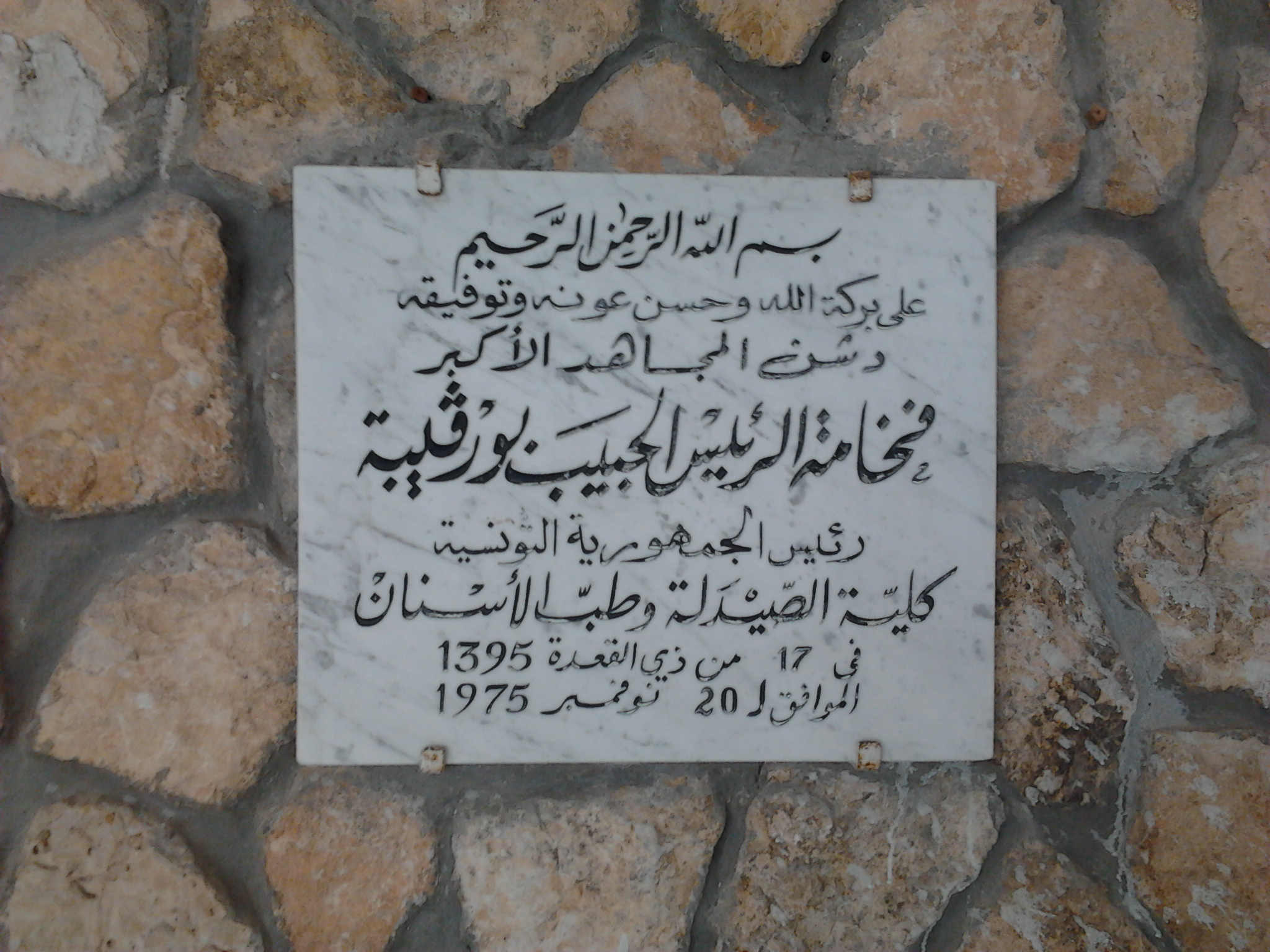
Plaque marking the inauguration of the faculties of dentistry and pharmacy on 20 November 1975

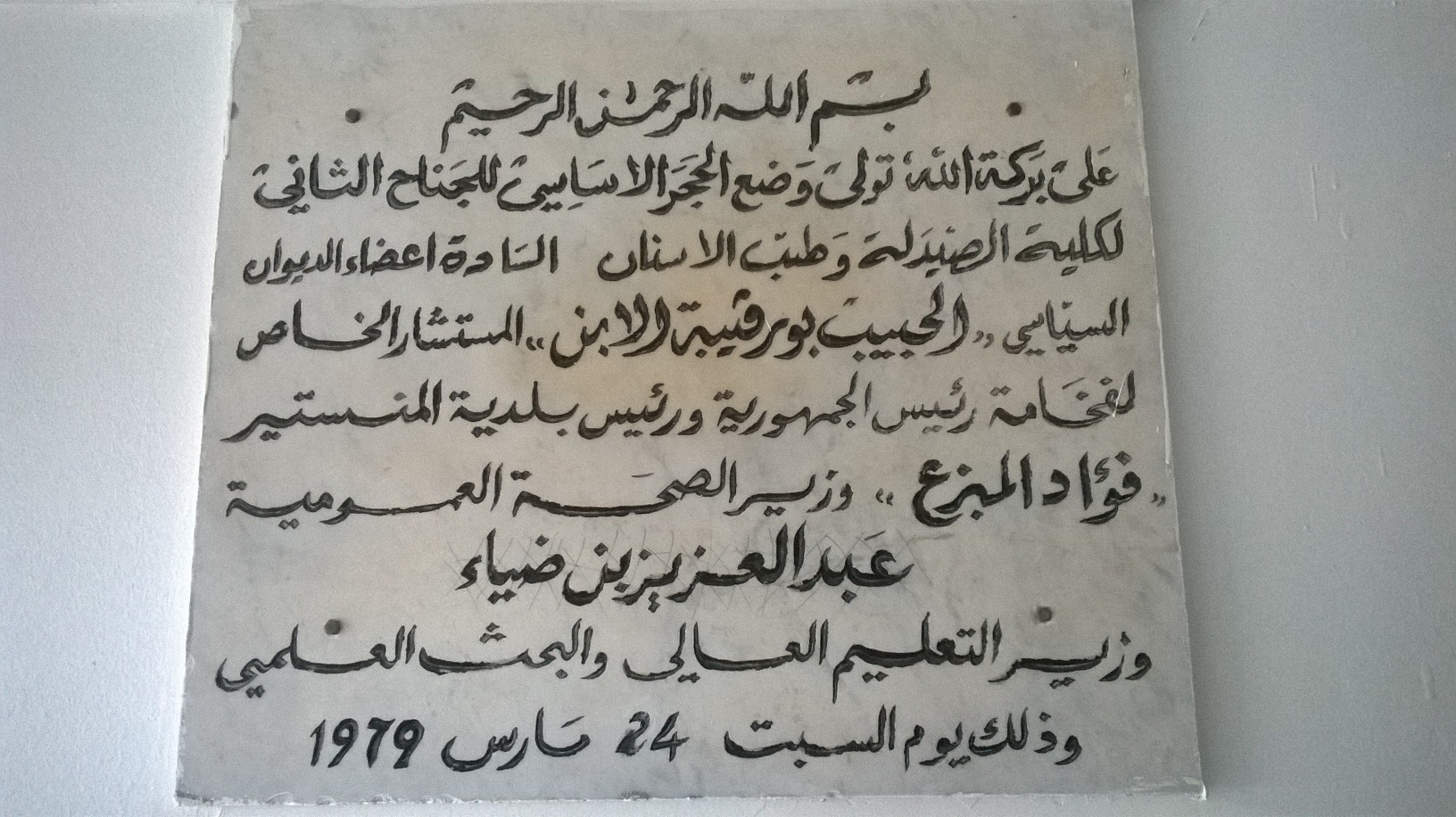
Plaque commemorating the beginning of the work on the second part of the faculties of dentistry and pharmacy on 24 March 1979

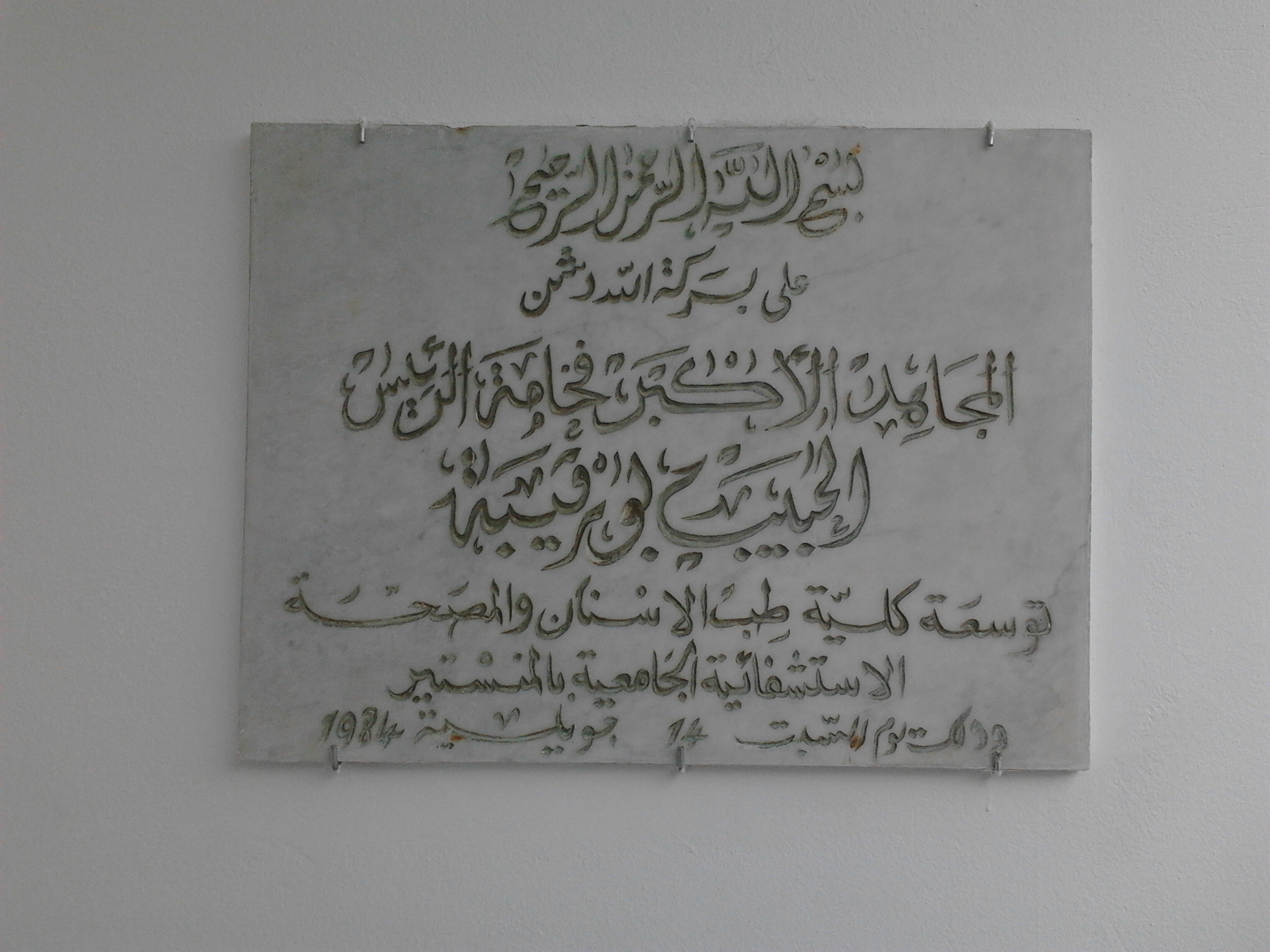
Plaque marking the expansion of the Faculty of Dentistry and of the University Clinic on 14 July 1984

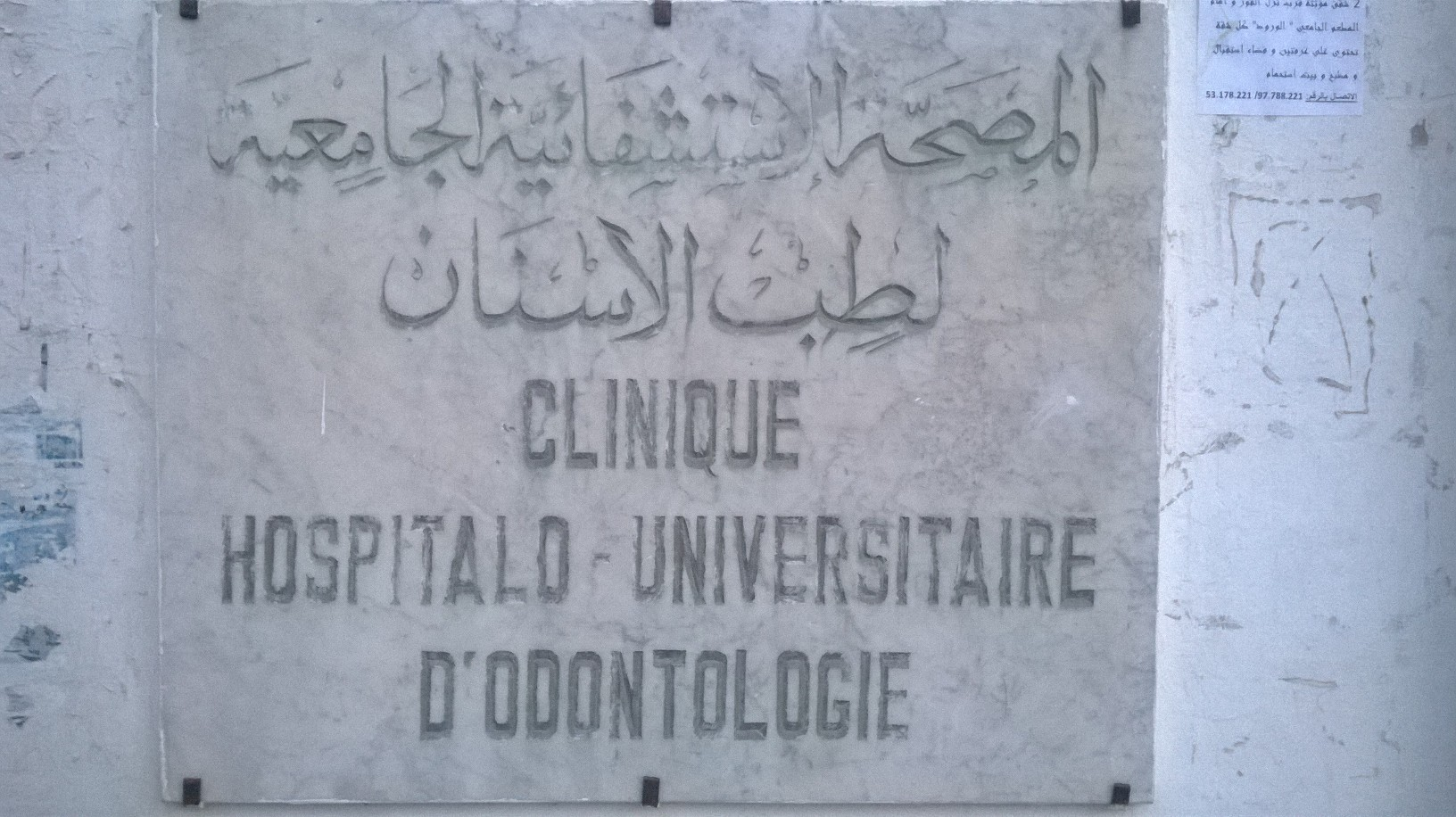
Plaque of the University Clinic of Dentistry of Monastir

=== Deans ===
From 1975 to 1990, the management of the faculty was assured by the deans of the faculty of pharmacy who then took charge of both faculties:

- Pr Mahmoud Yaâcoub (1975–?);
- Pr Moncef Jeddi (?–1990);
- Pr Mongi Beïzig (1990–1996) : first odontologist dean of the faculty;
- Pr Mongi Majdoub (1996–2002) : two mandates;
- Pr Khaled Bouraoui (2002–2005);
- Pr Abdellatif Abid (2005–2012) : two mandates;
- Pr Ali Ben Rahma (2012–2017) : two mandates;
- Pr Fethi Maatouk (from 2017-2019)
- Pr Mohamed Salah Khalfi(2019 – present)

== Location ==
The faculty is located on Avicenna Street in Monastir near the Faculty of Pharmacy, the Faculty of Medicine and the Graduate School of Health Sciences and Techniques and is associated with a university-hospital dental clinic.

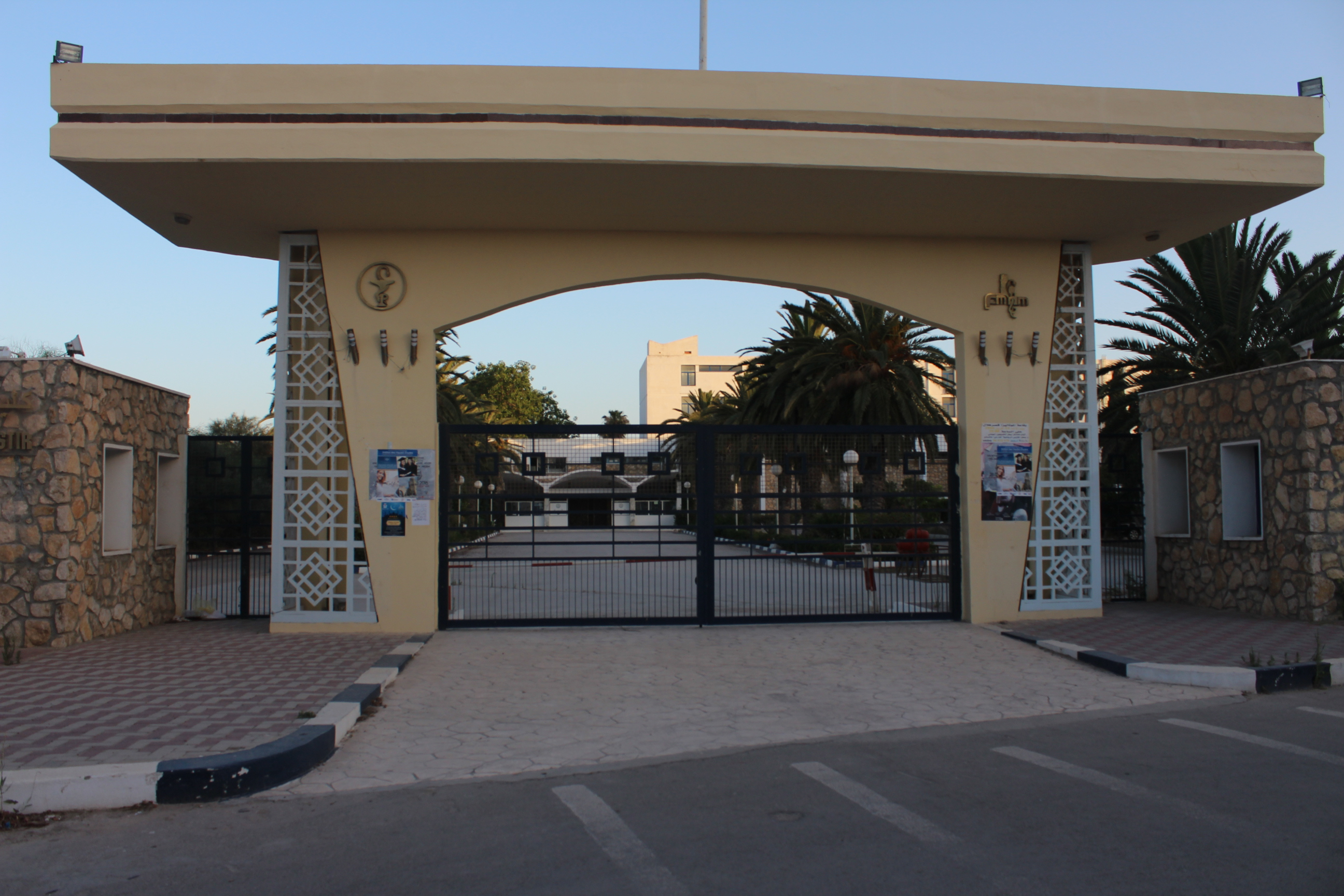
Portal of the faculties of dentistry and pharmacy

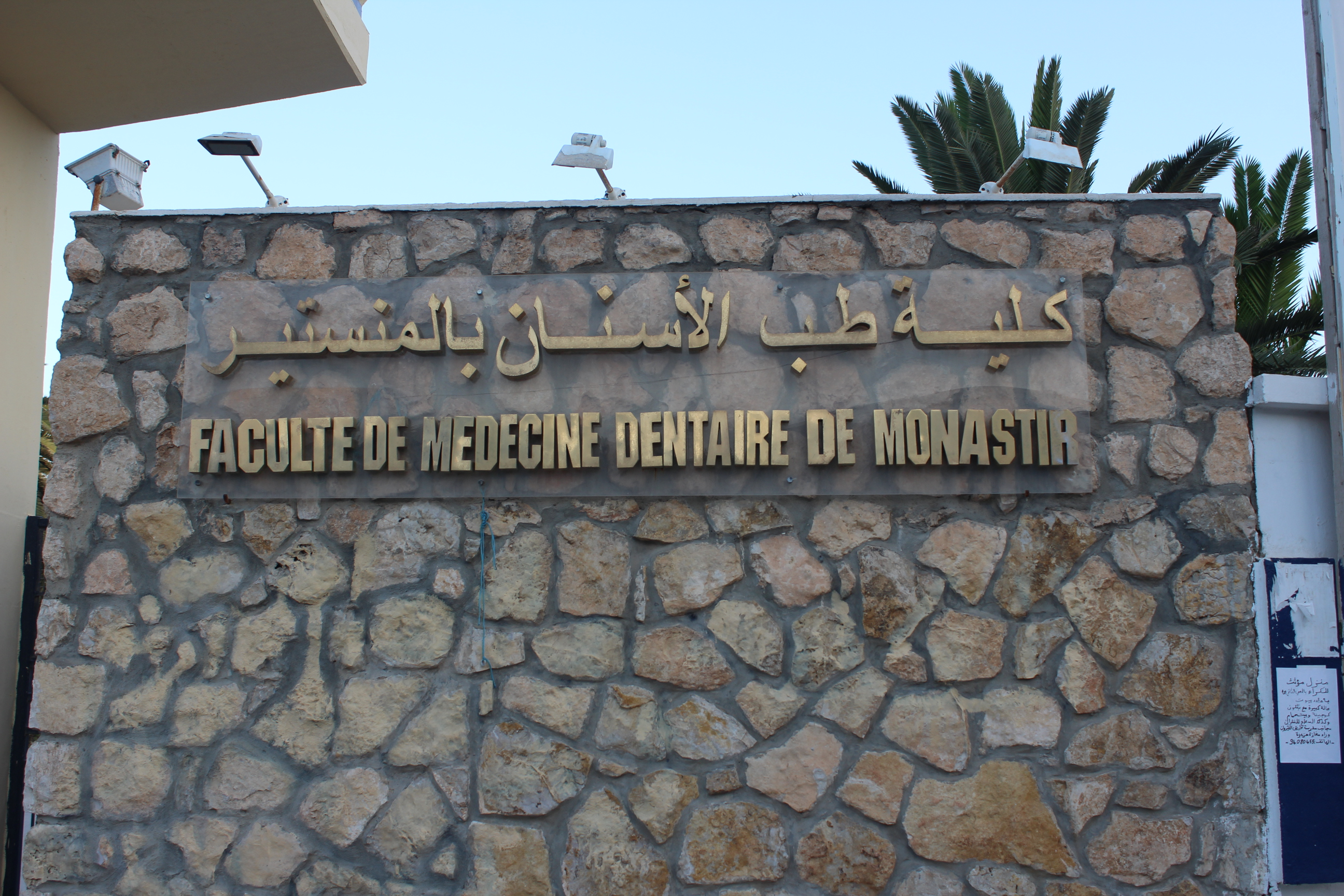
Plate in front of the gate

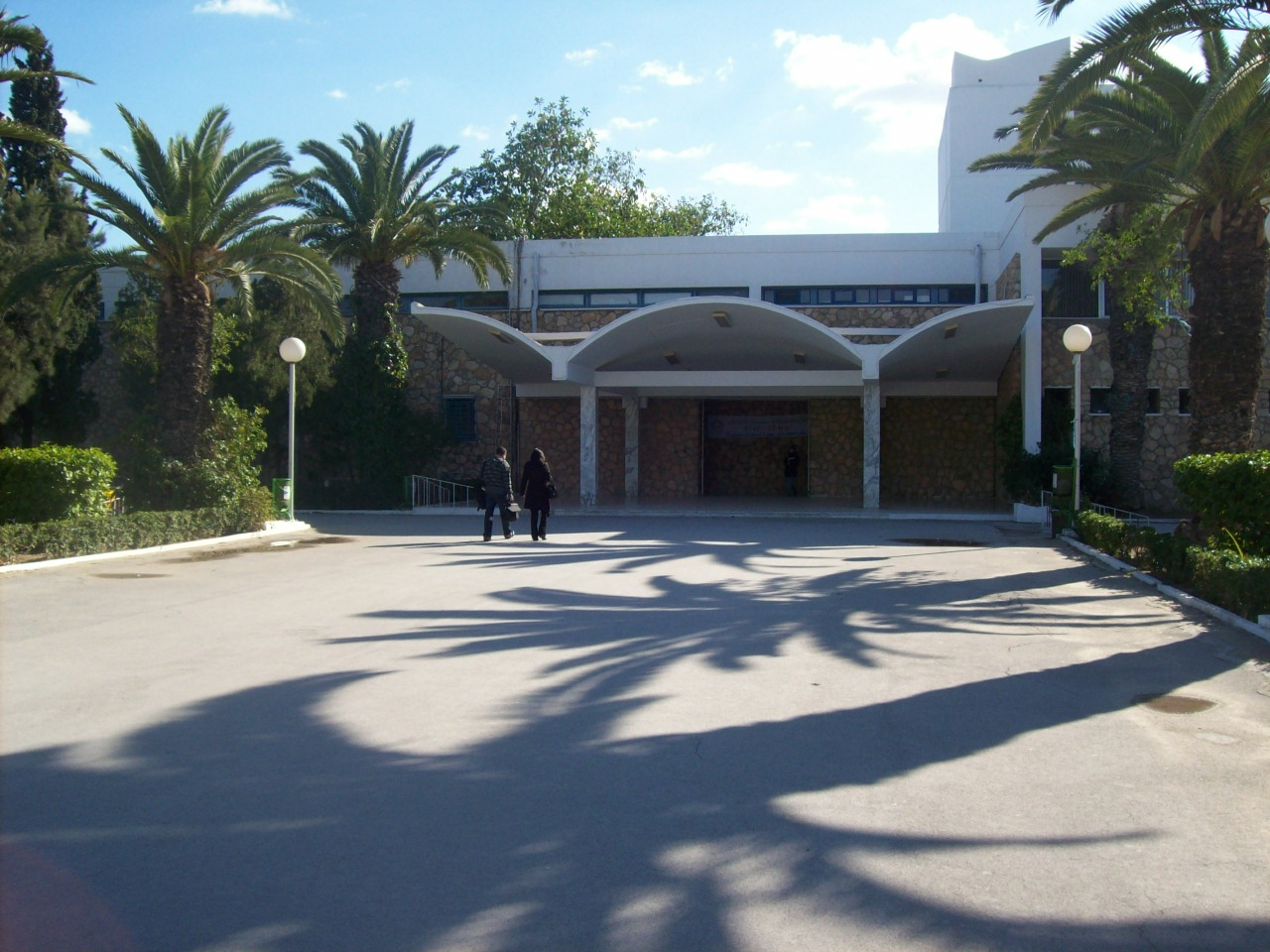
Common entrance of both faculties

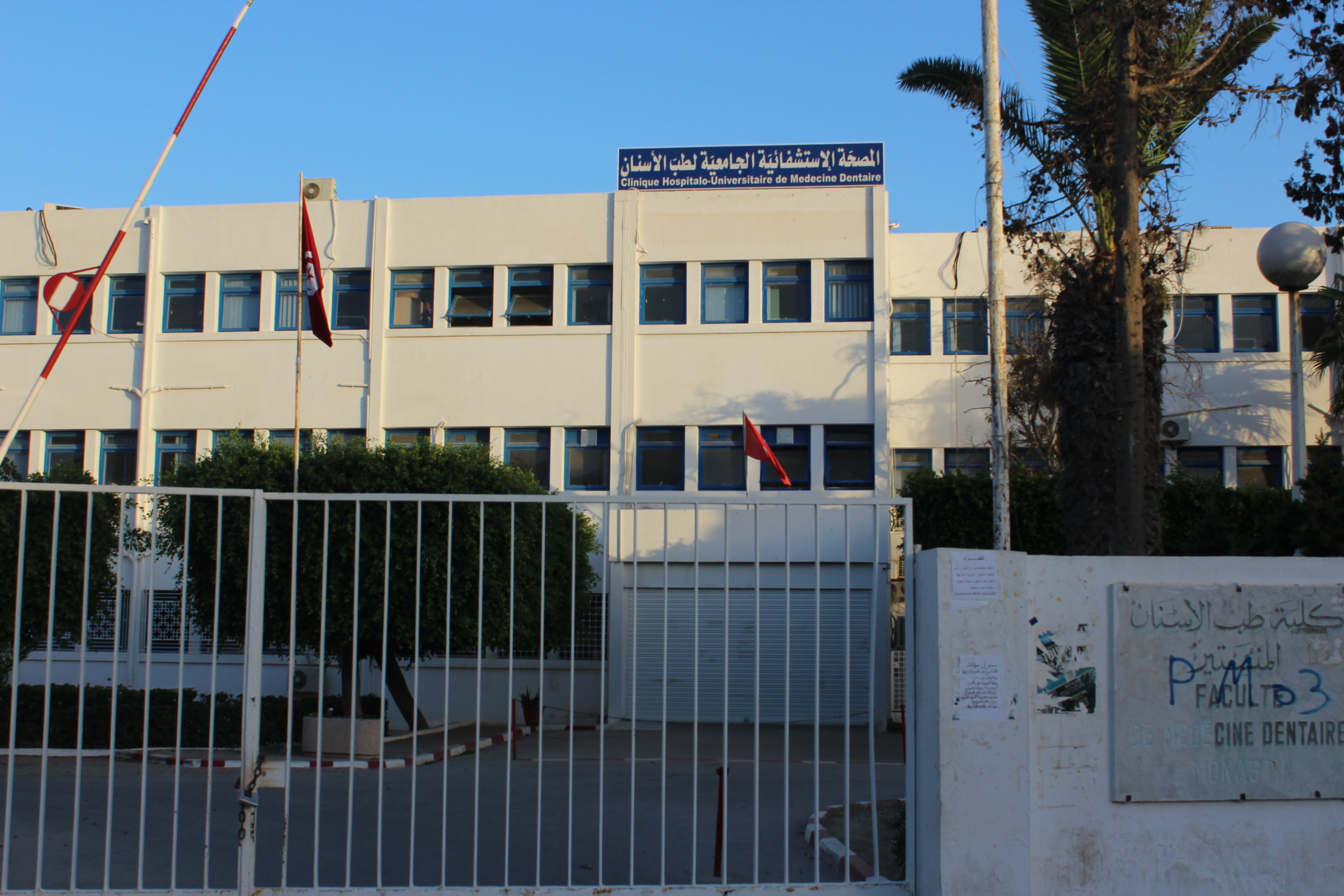
University Clinic of Dentistry in Monastir

== Numbers ==
According to 2017–2018 statistics, the Faculty of Dentistry in Monastir has:

- 1516 students.
- 141 university professors.
- Contains more than 11 research units.

== Infrastructure ==
The faculty covers an area of almost 5,000 m^{2} and shares the campus with the faculty of pharmacy.

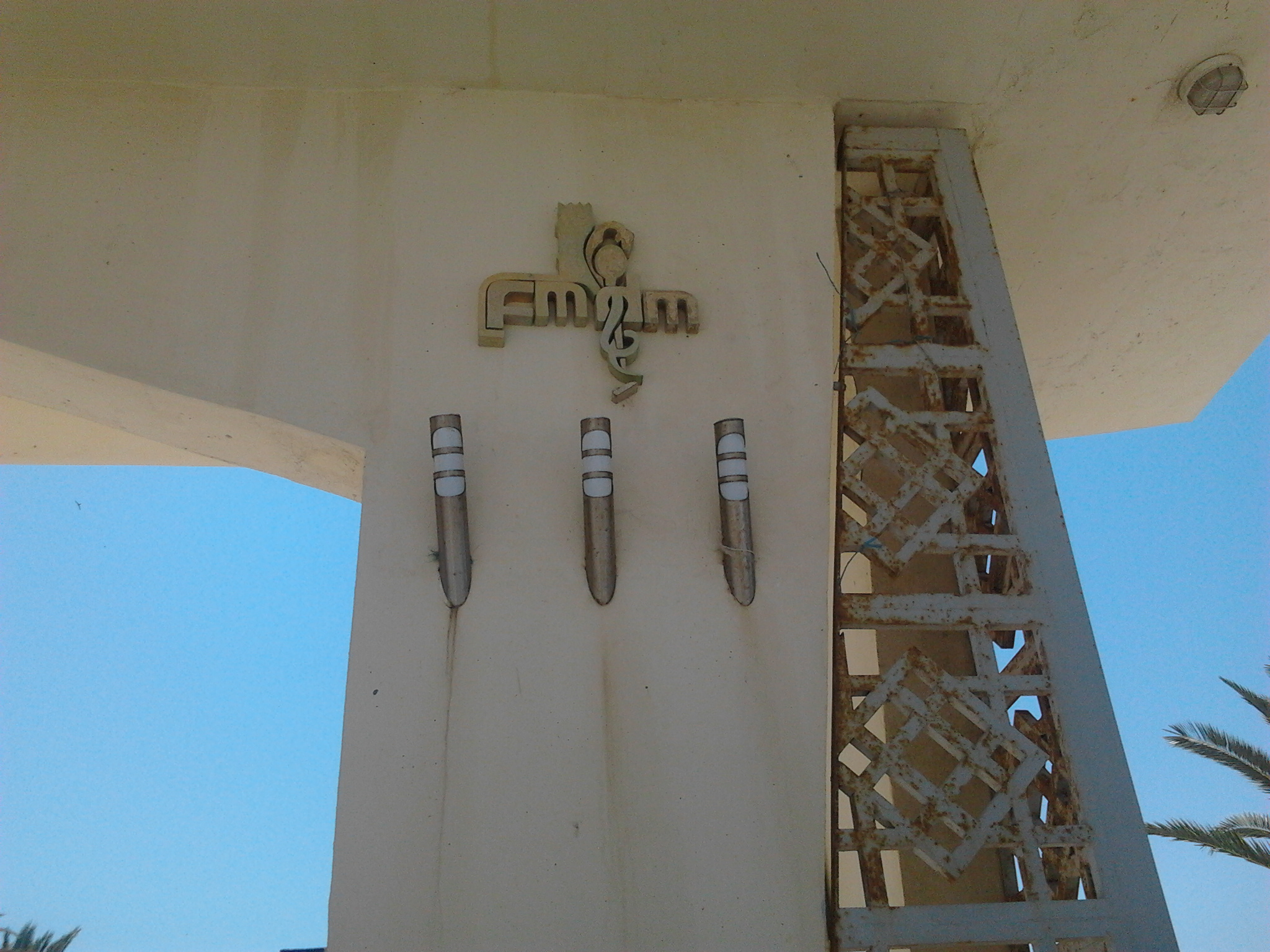
Logo of the university on the entrance portal

=== Amphitheatres and other ===
- Three amphitheatres for lectures;
- A university auditorium for conventions;
- A Library;
- Two Internet access rooms;
- A cultural and leisure area;
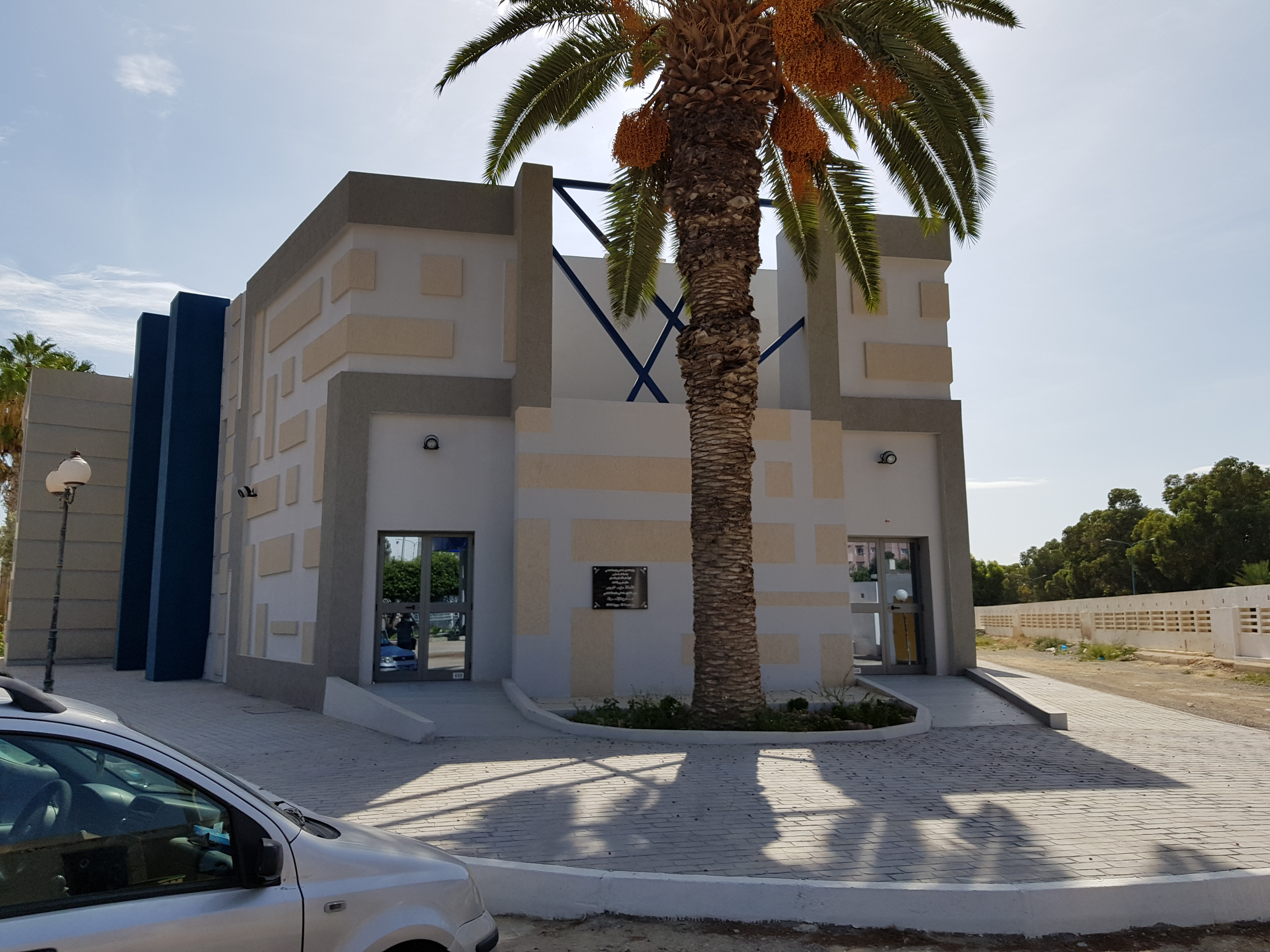
Auditorium

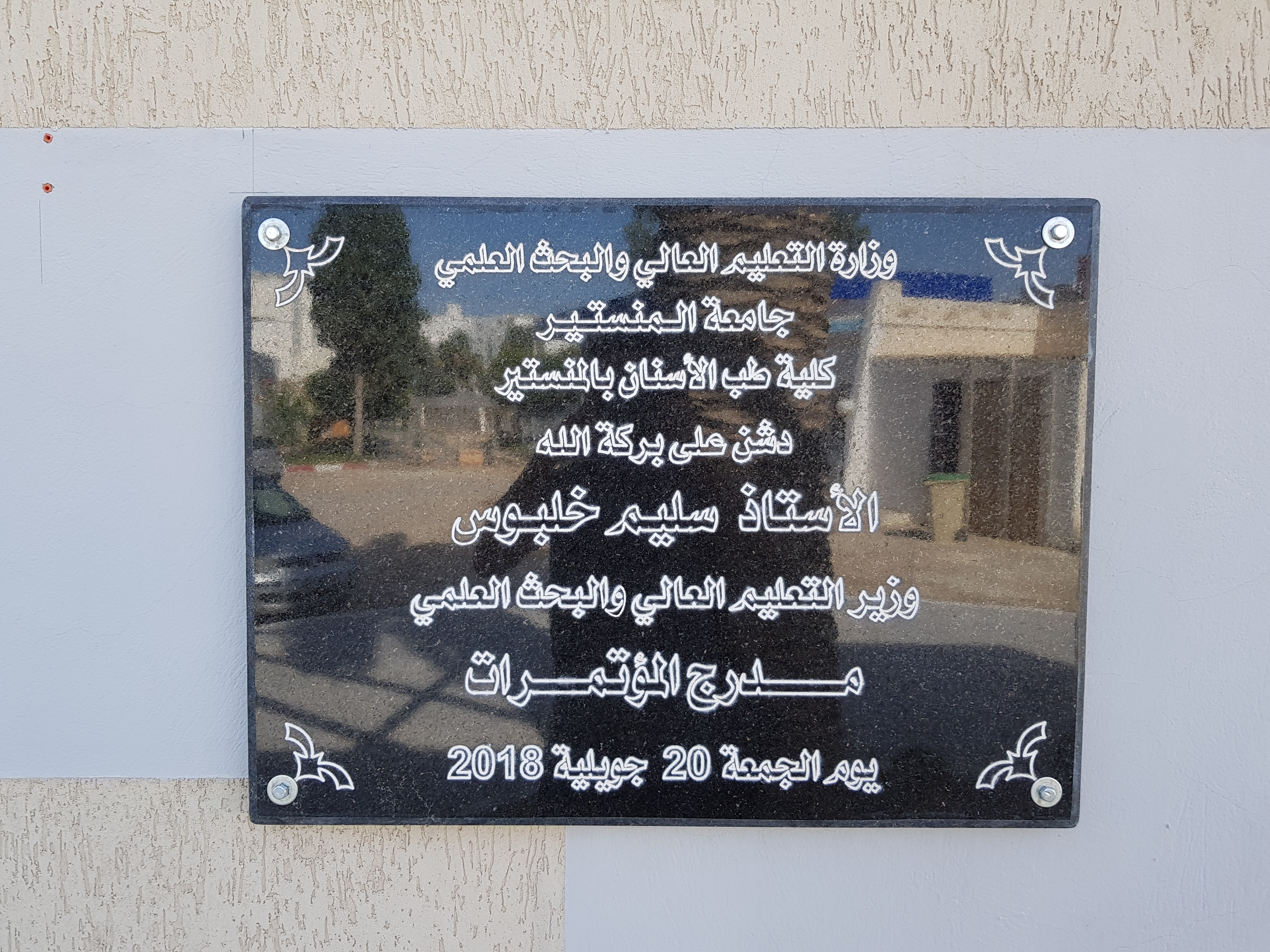
Plaque of the inauguration of the auditorium

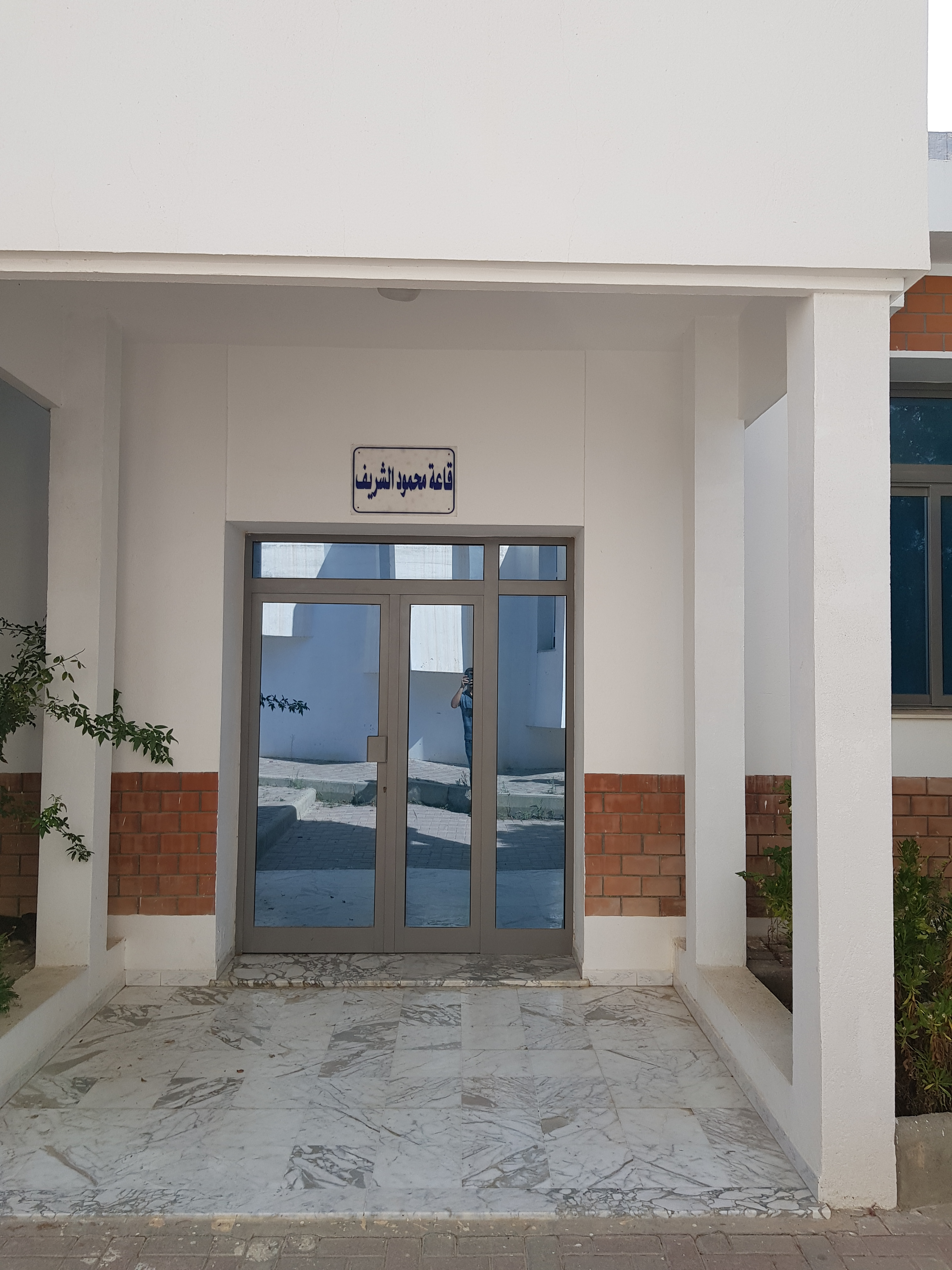
Thesis room

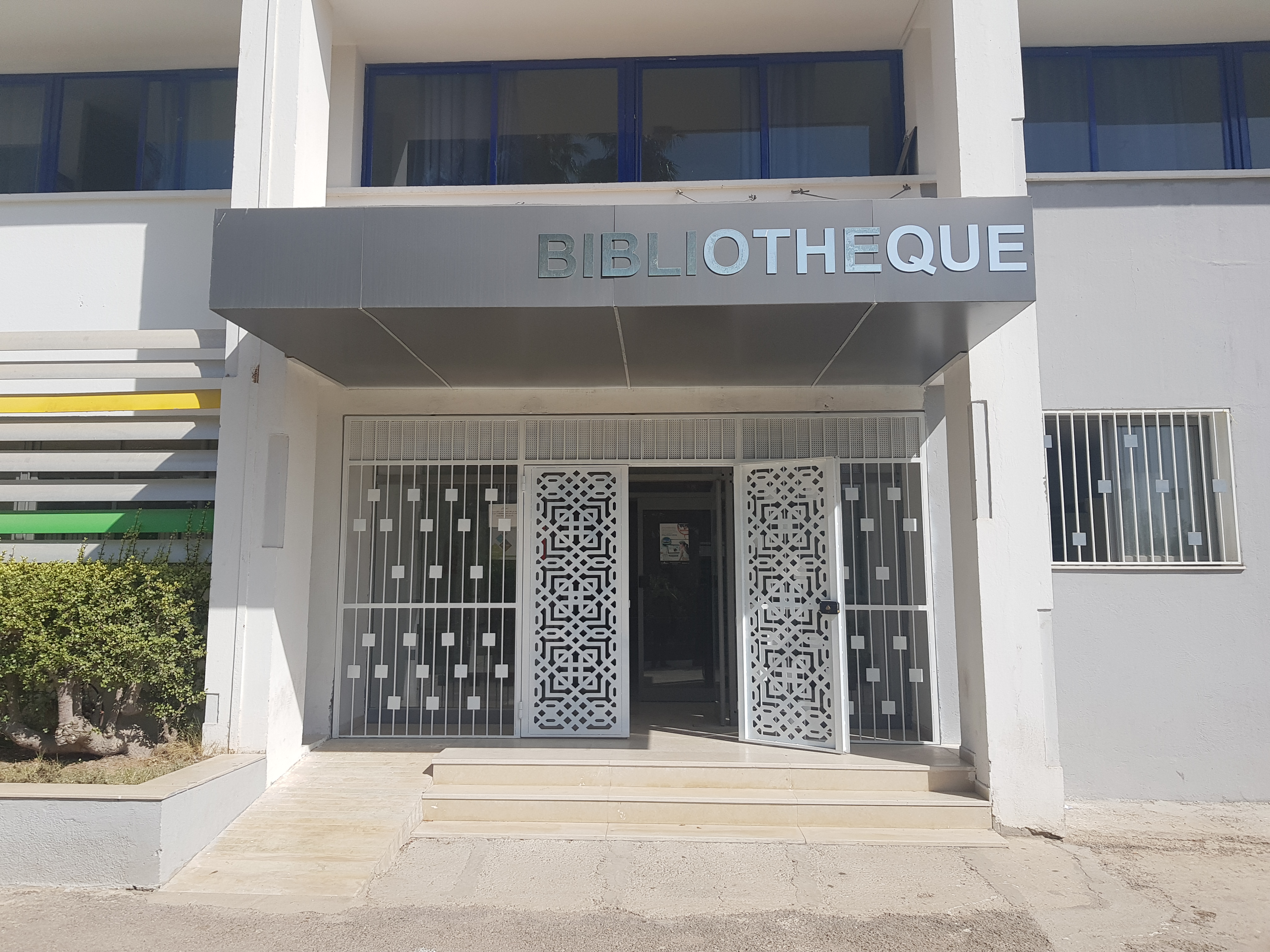
Library entrance

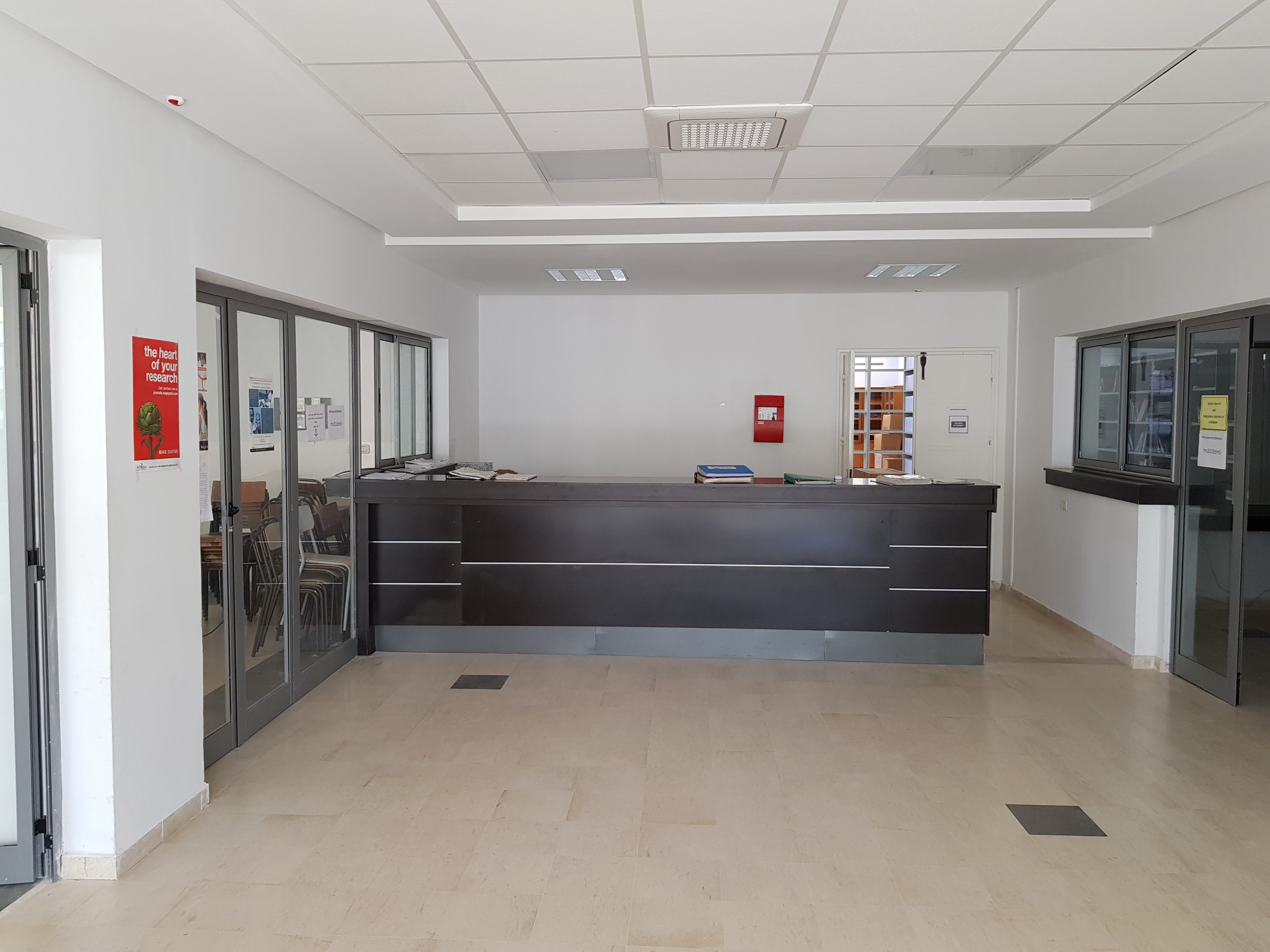
Inside the library

=== Teaching laboratories ===
- Eight teaching laboratories :
  - Anatomy;
  - Histology;
  - Molecular and cellular biology;
  - Computer science;
  - Physiology;
  - Chemistry;
  - Biochemistry;
  - Microbiology;
- Nine practical work rooms :
  - Fixed prosthodontics;
  - Removable partial prosthesis;
  - Total prosthesis;
  - Conservative Odontology and Endodontics;
  - General anatomy;
  - Dental anatomy;
  - Biomaterials;
  - Chemistry;
  - Biochemistry;

=== Research units and laboratories ===
- Eleven research units :
  - Conservative odontology and endodontics;
  - Odontological research on growth;
  - Piezology;
  - Biomaterials and biotechnology;
  - Natural bioactive alkaloids and diterpenoids;
  - Epidemiology and prevention of oral diseases;
  - Conservative dentistry;
  - Occlusodontia;
  - Preventive and interceptive orthodontics;
  - Technological and clinical applications of all-ceramics for prosthesis;
  - Radioclinical diagnosis and treatment of maxillary tumors;
- A research laboratory on biologically compatible substances.

The university's professors are known for their contributions to the field of scientific and medical research nationally and internationally.

=== Associated hospitals and departements ===
In order to provide a comprehensive training for residents, interns and students in the fourth and fifth grades, they must get through daily clinical traineeship during their studies. These specialized trainings are held in the following university-hospital centers that receive students, interns and residents :

- Clinical University-Hospital of Dentistry associated with the faculty and which includes eight main departments :
  - Fixed prosthodontics
  - Removable partial prosthesis
  - Total prosthesis
  - Orthodontics
  - Periodontology
  - Conservative Odontology and Endodontics
  - Pediatric odontology and prevention
  - Oral medicine and surgery
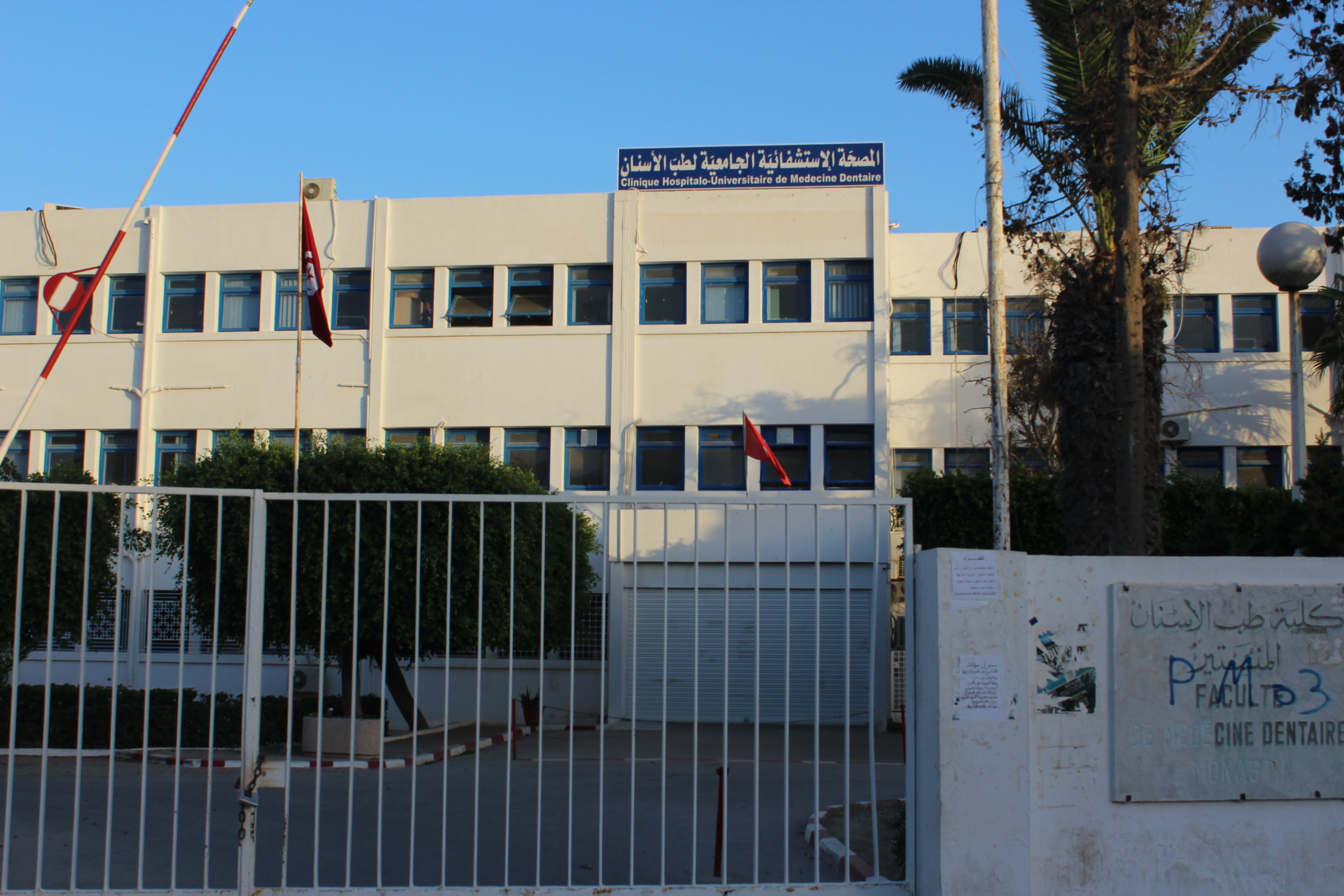
- the dental clinic
  University-Hospital Farhat-Hached of Sousse
- University-Hospital Sahloul of Sousse
- University-Hospital Habib-Bourguiba of Sfax;
- University-Hospital Hédi-Chaker of Sfax;
- University-Hospital La Rabta of Tunis
- University-Hospital Charles-Nicolle of Tunis
- Military University-Hospital of Tunis
- Military University-Hospital of Bizerte
- University-Hospital Fattouma-Bourguiba of Monastir
- University-Hospital Tahar-Sfar of Mahdia

== Curriculum ==
The university delivers doctoral degrees in dentistry and provides training for master's and doctoral theses.

The programme of medical studies for the national diploma of doctor of dentistry lasts six years: five years of externship and one year of internship, divided into:

- two years in the first cycle of dental studies: a basic science-based training, thus more theoretical than practical;
- three years in the second cycle of dental studies: theoretical and practical training with immersion in the clinical environment (students spend as many hours at the clinic as the faculty during this cycle);
- a year of paid compulsory internship trainee and validated at the end by a final examination:
  - six months in the Monastir University Clinic of Dentistry divided between two separate departements
  - six months in an associated university hospital divided into four months in the departement of stomatology and two months in another hospital department (cardiology, ENT, infectious diseases, Oral and maxillofacial surgery or internal medicine);
- closure of the studies and of the internship by a thesis defense.

These studies are organized by discipline, modules and certificates and are given in the form of lectures, tutorials, practical work and clinical placements. Students are assessed by written and oral exams, practical and directed exams and clinical examinations.

After the six-year basic cycle, students who got their diploma or validated their internship may pass a national residency examination (specialization exam) to register for the third cycle of specialized studies in dentistry and pursue specialization studies either clinical or fundamental

These specialties are divided into two major categories:

- Clinical Specialties
  - Fixed prosthodontics
  - Removable partial prosthesis
  - Total prosthesis
  - Orthodontics
  - Periodontology
  - Conservative Odontology and Endodontics
  - Pediatric odontology and prevention
  - Oral medicine and surgery
  - Dental radiology
- Basic odontological specialties
  - Anatomy
  - Dental anatomy
  - Legal odontology
  - Biomaterials
  - Bacteriology, virology and immunology
  - Histology – embryology
  - Physiology
  - Pharmacology in dentistry
  - Biophysics in dentistry

== Community life ==
- Cultural Association of the FMDM: association created in 1997 and regrouping several clubs (video, music, painting, internal radio, dance and magazine);
- University Sports Association of the FMDM: association created in 1981;
- Scout FMDM: Scouts association created in 1994 by students and mainly concerned with volunteer work;
- Tunisian Association for Dental Research: its main objective is to promote research in dentistry by providing various means of training and application;
- Tunisian Association of Dental Students: Member of the International Association of Dental Students.

== International relations ==
Since its inception, the university has been developing exchange agreements and cooperations, given the historical circumstances of its creation, as with the faculties of dental surgery in Marseille, Paris-VII, Bordeaux and Alger.

In 2017–2018, the faculty has 42 foreign students out of a total of 1,526, representing 3% of the total student population, in a context marked by the evolution of African cooperation and the opening up of countries of the continent to collaboration in scientific research and the exchange of experiences and information.

Since its affiliation with the University of Monastir in 2004, most of the international conventions are made through it, such as Erasmus +, Erasmus Mundus, the Quality Support Program for Higher Education, the Deutscher Akademischer Austauschdienst, NursingCAS or other types of bilateral exchanges with foreign universities.

Among the partner institutions:

- Faculty of dentistry at Saint Joseph University, Beirut (Lebanon);
- Toulouse-III-Paul-Sabatier University (France);
- Faculty of Odontology of Montpellier (France);
- University of Auvergne (France): framework convention;
- Sabha University (Libya): Framework Convention.

== See also ==
- List of universities and colleges
- University of Monastir
- Monastir
