= Daniel Laskin =

American surgeon (1924–2021)

Daniel M. Laskin
- Born: September 3, 1924; New York City, New York, U.S.
- Died: December 8, 2021 (aged 97)
- Education: Indiana University Bloomington; University of Illinois College of Dentistry
- Known for: Contributions to Oral and Maxillofacial Surgery (textbook and primary research), educator, clinician
- Scientific career
- Fields: Oral and Maxillofacial Surgery
- Workplaces: Virginia Commonwealth University, University of Illinois College of Dentistry

Daniel M. Laskin (September 3, 1924 – December 8, 2021) was an American oral and maxillofacial surgeon and educator who contributed to his field for over fifty years. He excelled as an educator, a researcher and a clinician. He served as American Association of Oral and Maxillofacial Surgeons president, as well as the International Association of Oral and Maxillofacial Surgery, and served as the editor of the Journal of Oral and Maxillofacial Surgery till his death. He was a major contributor to the dental literature with over 900 contributions to the field of Oral and Maxillofacial Surgery. He co-authored 16 textbooks and monographs.

== Early life and education ==
Laskin was born in New York City on September 3, 1924. Starting in 1943, he attended New York University for 1 year. He then transferred to Indiana University Bloomington, where he received a BS, he went on to attend Indiana University School of Dentistry. He then completed an Oral Surgery Internship at Jersey City Medical Center. He completed his residency training in Oral and Maxillofacial Surgery at the University of Illinois and Cook County Hospitals. He also served a brief time in the United States Army and became a private first class while attending training for the Medical Corps at Camp Grant, Illinois and Fort Benjamin Harrison, Indiana.

== Career ==
Upon finishing residency, Laskin began his career as an OMS educator and practitioner at the University of Illinois College of Dentistry, where he worked for over 30 years. His mentor was Bernard Sarnat, an oral and plastic surgeon who made numerous contributions as a pioneer in the field of craniofacial surgery. Laskin succeeded Sarnat as program director and went on to progress the specialty. At one time he was running the University of Illinois and Cook County Hospital Residency programs and had 22 residents. He then transferred to Medical College of Virginia at VCU in 1984 where he continued to work as an educator, researcher and clinician.

In 2007, Laskin established the Lectureship in Professional Ethics at Indiana University School of Dentistry.

"The Laskin Lectureship is the first if its kind to be established at Indiana University School of Dentistry," stated IUSD Dean Dr. Lawrence Goldblatt. He added, "Dr. Laskin, whose own career has exemplified professional ethics as well as promoted it, has made another landmark contribution to our school in providing the wherewithal to bring in the finest authorities on the subject every year for the benefit of our students, faculty, alumni and entire professional community. We at IUSD will be forever in his debt."

Laskin was well known to the Oral and Maxillofacial Surgery community even at the global level. He received honorary memberships to eight national oral and maxillofacial surgery societies. He received honorary doctoral degrees from England, Scotland, as well as his alma mater, Indiana University.

== Later life ==
Laskin died on December 8, 2021, at the age of 97.
