= Higher Institute of Languages, Moknine =

Academic Institution in Tunisia

Higher Institute of Applied Languages of Moknine
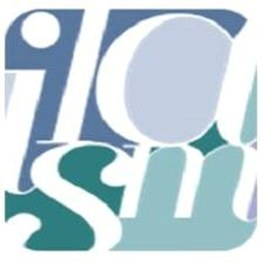
- ISLAM Logo
- Type: Public
- Established: 2001
- Affiliations: Monastir University
- Director: Saad Borghol
- Location: Moknine, Monastir, Tunisia; 35°37′39″N 10°53′44.04″E
- Website: islaatm.rnu.tn/eng/home

Higher Institute of Applied Languages of Moknine (Arabic: المعهد العالي للغات المطبقة بالمكنين) or ISLAM (French: Institut Supérieur des Langues Appliquées de Moknine) is a Tunisian institute founded in August 2001 under the University of Monastir.

== Organization and Administration ==
Dr. Saad Borghol is the Director of the institute, Dalila Limame is the Head of the Department of Roman Languages, and Karim Sayeb is the General Secretary.

== Diplomas ==
Master's Degree in Communication and Valorization of the Mediterranean Cultural Heritage.

Professional Master's Degree in Languages, Communication, and Entreprises.

Bachelor's Degrees in languages such as Spanish, English, Italian, and German. Specialties include Tourism and Heritage, Administrations and Economy as well as Business English.
