= Kurt Hermann Thoma =

Kurt H. Thoma
- Born: December 2, 1883; Basel, Switzerland
- Died: June 5, 1972 (aged 88)
- Education: Harvard School of Dental Medicine
- Known for: Founder of American Board of Pathology, First Editor-in-Chief of Oral Surgery, Oral Medicine, Oral Pathology, and Oral Radiology and being the father of Oral and Maxillofacial Pathology
- Medical career
- Profession: Dentist
- Institutions: Harvard School of Dental Medicine, University of Pennsylvania Dental School
- Sub-specialties: Oral Surgeon

Kurt H. Thoma (December 2, 1883 – June 5, 1972) was an American oral surgeon known as the founder of the American Board of Oral Pathology. He was also the editor-in-chief of the journal Oral Surgery, Oral Medicine, Oral Pathology, and Oral Radiology for 22 years. To many Thoma was recognized as the Father of oral and maxillofacial pathology and the defender of oral and maxillofacial surgery and a great teacher of oral medicine.

== Life ==
He was born in Basel, Switzerland and attended the Institute of Technology in Switzerland where he studied architecture. He eventually moved to USA in 1908 and received his dental degree from Harvard School of Dental Medicine in 1911. He then returned to Switzerland to learn usage of Procaine in Dental anesthesia. He returned to United States later on and served as Professor of Oral Pathology and Oral Surgery at Harvard. He also taught at Boston University and Pennsylvania Dental School. He served as the editor in chief for Oral Surgery, Oral Medicine and Oral Pathology for 22 years.

Thoma wrote several textbooks and wrote over 300 scientific articles during his career. Thoma was consultant for the United States Public Health Service, the Veterans Administration, Walter Reed Army Medical Center and Armed Forces Institute of Pathology. He was the oral surgeon to the Brooks Hospital in Brookline, Massachusetts for 50 years and was on staff of many Boston area hospitals. In 1912, he married Louise Bird and they had two children, Kurt Richard Thoma and Richard S. Alles.

== Textbooks ==
- Oral Anesthesiology, 1914
- Oral Abscesses, 1916
- Oral Roentgenology, 1917
- Teeth, Diet and Health, 1923
- Clinical Pathology of the Jaws 1925,
- Oral Diagnosis and Treatment Planning, 1936
- Oral Pathology, 1941
- Oral Surgery, 1948 (The C. V. Mosby Company)

== Awards and positions ==
- Professor of Oral Surgery - Henry M. Goldman School of Dental Medicine
- Professor of Oral Surgery & Pathology - Harvard Dental School
- Professor of Oral Surgery - University of Pennsylvania School of Dental Medicine
- American Board of Oral Pathology - Founder
- American Academy of Oral Pathology - President
- Omicron Kappa Upsilon - President
- Professor Emeritus - Harvard Dental School
- Curator- Harvard Dental Museum
- Oral Surgery, Oral Medicine and Oral Pathology Journal - Editor in Chief (1948-1970)
- American Academy of Dental Science - President
- Harvard Odontological Society - President
- Royal College of Surgeons of Edinburgh and England - Fellowship
- Jarvie Award
- Alfred Fones Medal
- Pierre Fauchard Medal
- Tomes Lectureship of Royal College of Surgeons
