= William Giannobile =

American periodontist, researcher, and academic administrator

William Vincent Giannobile is an American periodontist, biomedical researcher, and academic administrator who serves as the Dean of the Harvard School of Dental Medicine and the A. Lee Loomis Jr. Professor of Oral Medicine, Infection and Immunity at Harvard University. He is recognized for his contributions to oral regenerative medicine, tissue engineering, periodontology, and precision oral health.

== Education ==
Giannobile received a Bachelor of Science in Biochemistry, a Doctor of Dental Surgery (DDS), and a Master of Science in Oral Biology from the University of Missouri–Kansas City. He later earned a Certificate in Periodontology and a Doctor of Medical Sciences (DMSc) degree in Oral Biology from the Harvard School of Dental Medicine. Following his graduate studies, he completed postdoctoral fellowships in molecular biology at the Dana–Farber Cancer Institute, Harvard Medical School, and the Forsyth Institute.

== Academic career ==
From 1996 to 1998, Giannobile served on the faculty of the Harvard School of Dental Medicine and the Forsyth Institute. In 1998, he joined the faculty of the University of Michigan, where he became Professor of Dentistry, Professor of Biomedical Engineering, and later Chair of the Department of Periodontics and Oral Medicine.

At the University of Michigan, he held the William K. and Mary Anne Najjar Endowed Professorship and served as Chair of the Department of Periodontics and Oral Medicine from 2012 until 2020.

Giannobile has maintained a continuously funded National Institutes of Health research program for more than two decades and has served as co-principal investigator of the Michigan–Pittsburgh–Wyss Regenerative Medicine Resource Center, an initiative focused on translating dental, oral, and craniofacial regenerative technologies into clinical practice.

== Dean of Harvard School of Dental Medicine ==
In April 2020, Harvard University announced Giannobile's appointment as the eleventh dean of the Harvard School of Dental Medicine. He assumed office on September 1, 2020, succeeding R. Bruce Donoff.

As dean, Giannobile has emphasized interdisciplinary collaboration among dentistry, medicine, engineering, and the biomedical sciences. His administration has focused on expanding research in precision medicine, regenerative therapies, oral-systemic health, and clinician-scientist training programs.

== Research ==
Giannobile's research focuses on oral and periodontal regenerative medicine, tissue engineering, biomaterials, precision medicine, and oral health diagnostics. He has authored more than 300 scientific publications, textbook chapters, and patents related to periodontology, regenerative medicine, and oral health research.

He served as Editor-in-Chief of the Journal of Dental Research, the official journal of the International Association for Dental, Oral, and Craniofacial Research (IADR), from 2010 to 2020.

His work has contributed to advances in bone regeneration, periodontal tissue engineering, stem-cell therapies, oral diagnostics, and personalized approaches to oral healthcare.

== Professional leadership ==
Giannobile has held leadership positions in several international research organizations. He served on the board of the Osteology Foundation from 2007 to 2022 and was elected president of the organization in 2019.

He is a Fellow of the American Association for the Advancement of Science (AAAS), the American Association for Dental, Oral, and Craniofacial Research (AADOCR), the International College of Dentists, and the American College of Dentists.

== Awards and honors ==
Giannobile has received numerous awards for research and academic leadership, including:

- American Dental Association Gold Medal Award for Excellence in Dental Research (2024)
- International Association for Dental, Oral, and Craniofacial Research Distinguished Scientist Award for Periodontal Research (2022)
- Norton M. Ross Award for Excellence in Clinical Research from the American Dental Association (2018)
- Jan Lindhe International Periodontology Research Award (2011)
- Distinguished Scientist Award, American Academy of Periodontology (2010)
