= Faculty of Pharmacy of Monastir =

Academic institution in Tunisia

- كلية الصيدلة بالمنستير
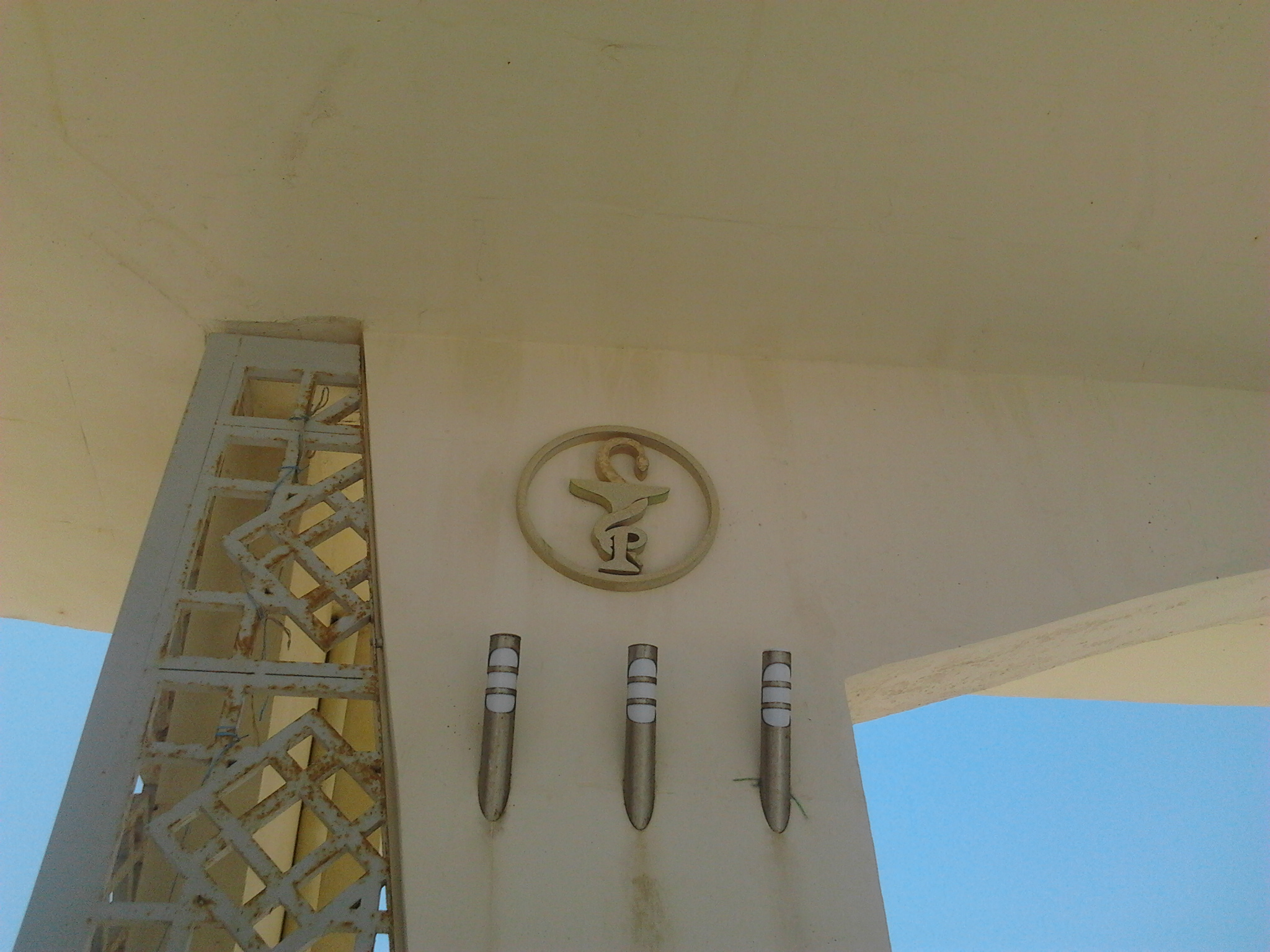
- Type: Public
- Established: 1975
- Affiliations: University of Monastir
- Dean: Pr. Abdelhalim Trabelsi
- Students: 1307 (2007–2008)
- Doctoral students: 18
- Location: Monastir, Tunisia; 35.7646°N 10.8302°E
- Campus: Urban
- Language: French
- Website: http://www.fphm.rnu.tn/

Faculty of Pharmacy of Monastir (Arabic: كلية الصيدلة بالمنستير) is affiliated to University of Monastir, located in the street Ibn Sina in Monastir in Tunisia. It was founded by Act No. 75/72 of 14 November 1975.

It is the only institution for the study of pharmacy in Tunisia. It delivers the diplomas of doctor of pharmacy and of pharmacists specialists in biology and hospital and industrial pharmacists. It provides doctoral training in the framework of master and doctoral thesis. The studies are organized according to a first cycle of two years, a second cycle of four years, including a year of internship, and a thesis to obtain the national diploma of doctor of pharmacy.

The faculty of Pharmacy shares the same campus with the faculty of dental medicine.

On November 20, 2015, the faculty celebrated its 40th anniversary.

In 2019, the International Conference of Deans of French-speaking Pharmacy Faculties evaluated the faculty.

In 2024, the faculty obtained ISO 21001 and ISO 9001 certifications.

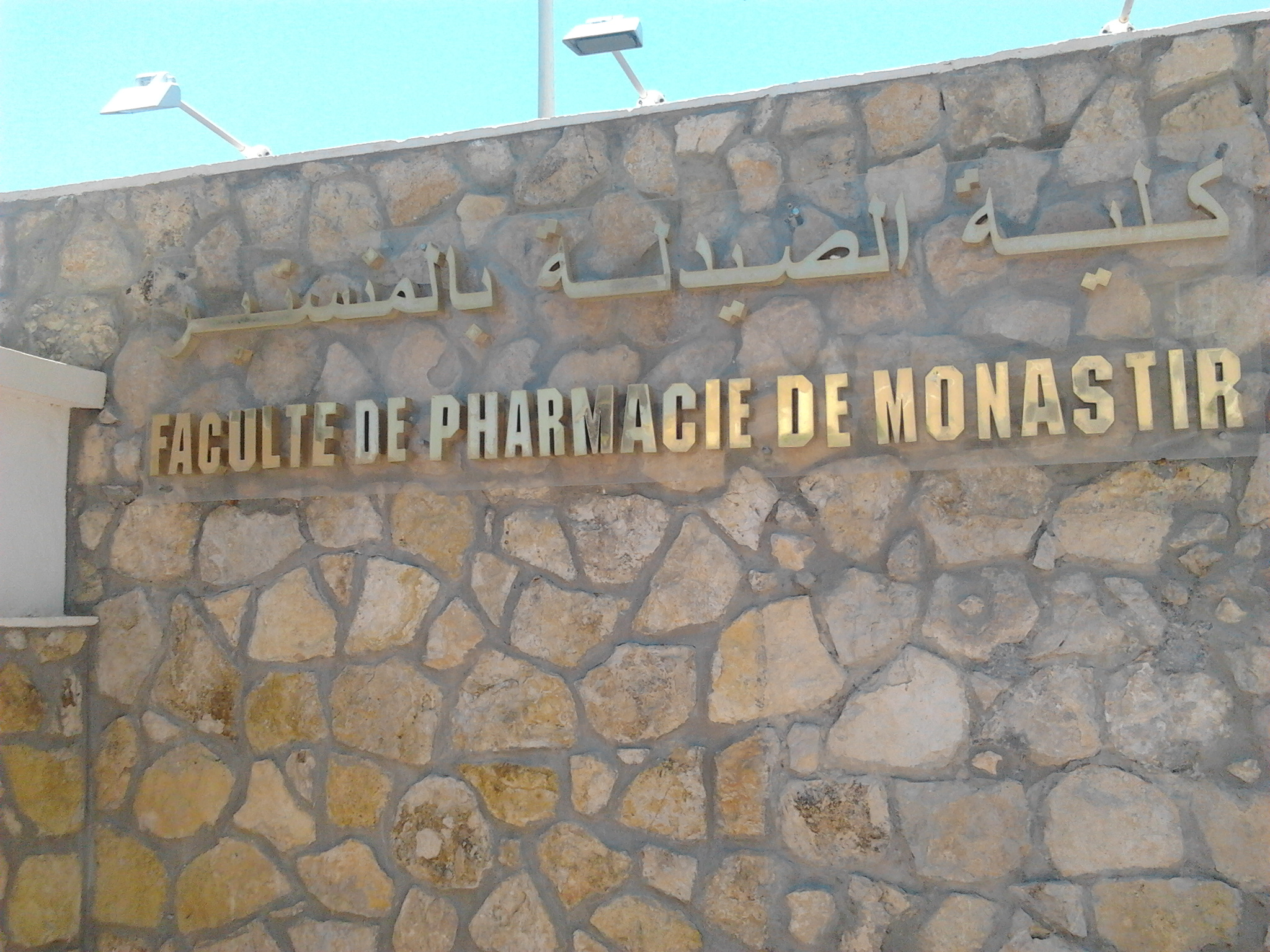
Faculty of Pharmacy of Monastir

== Deanship ==
In 2012, Professor Souad Sfar is the dean of the faculty and Professor Fethi Safta its vice-dean. In 2015, they were replaced by Professors Abdelhalim Trabelsi and Mohsen Hassine respectively.

== Departments ==
- Clinical biology A : toxicology, biochemistry, hematology;
- Clinical biology B : first aid, immunology, parasitology, microbiology;
- Pharmaceutical Sciences A : Clinical pharmacy, cytogenetics, botany, cellular biology, vegetal biology, pharmacology, physiology, pharmacognosy;
- Pharmaceutical Sciences B : mathematics, genetics, reproduction, general chemistry, organic chemistry, therapeutic chemistry, biophysics, Galenic pharmacy, Analytic chemistry

== Certifications ==
- National Diploma of Doctor of Pharmacy
- Certificate of Specialist in Medical Biology
- Master of Biotechnology and Immunology Applied to Infectious Diseases
- Master of Drug Development
- Doctorate in Pharmaceutical Sciences
- University Qualification in Pharmaceutical Sciences

== International cooperation ==
- Erasmus+

== See also ==
- Monastir
- University of Monastir
- Faculty of Dental Medicine of Monastir
- Faculty of Medicine of Monastir
