= Harvard Dental Museum =

Former dental museum in Boston, Massachusetts

The Harvard Dental Museum dates from the late 1870s but the exact date of its formation is unknown. The first annual Announcement of The Dental School indicates a museum was in existence, or at least in prospect, in 1868–69. The original specimens in the collection were provided by Dental School Graduates who were required to provide specimens to the Dental Museum to be used as instructional materials for students. Dr. Arthur T. Cabot presented about 175 specimens to the Dental Museum in 1881 and is considered the museum's founder.

At its peak, the Dental Museum held 14,000 specimens in its collection including skulls, dental instruments, dentures, and minerals and metals used in dentistry.

The museum was dismantled in 1937 due to the changing nature of dental education at Harvard, and its collections were placed in storage or dispersed. The historical records of the museum are preserved in the Francis A. Countway Library of Medicine. Other specimens from the museum are found in the Warren Anatomical Museum.

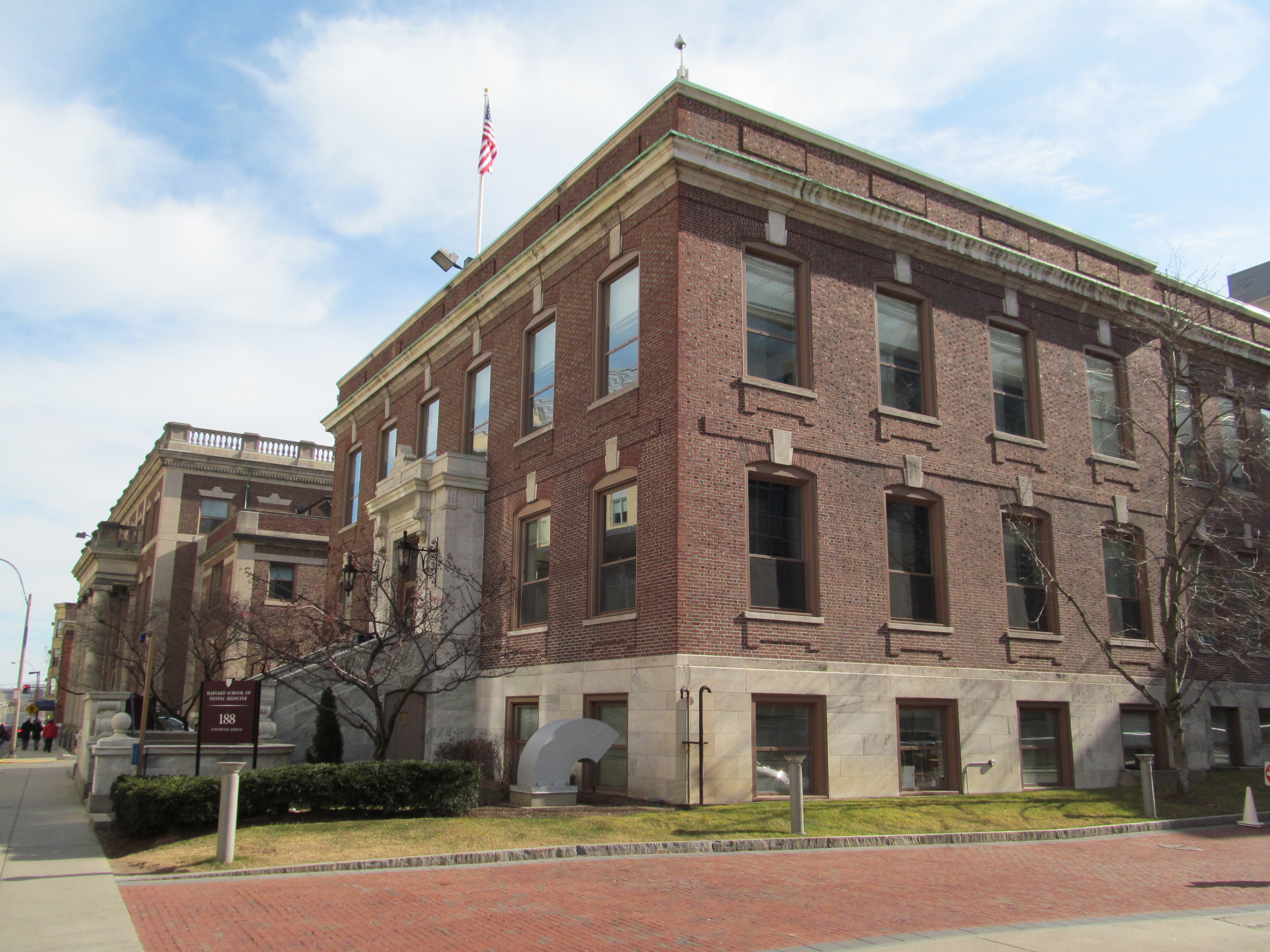
The final location of the Harvard Dental Museum on Longwood Ave in Boston, Massachusetts.

== Establishment ==
As far as the establishment of the Harvard Dental Museum, very much is still unknown. The museum began when 175 specimens were donated by Arthur Tracy Cabot, the first curator. These specimens became the center of the pathological collection which related to major diseases of the time. This collection was known as the starting point for the Harvard Dental Museum. The museum began by holding these specimens and also housing important tools such as ancient dentistry tools. The collection of specimens and tools only grew until it reached about 14000 in the collection as a whole. Records of dismantling the museum are very hard to trace but it seemed as though there were no curators to fill the position. The specimens were then donated to several medical practices to be used for teaching the next generation of doctors.

== Administration ==
=== Curators ===
==== Dr. Arthur Tracy Cabot ====
Dr. Arthur Tracy Cabot (1852- 1912) was the very first curator of the Harvard Dental Museum from 1879 to 1881. In addition to being an administrator for the museum, he also was an instructor in the Harvard Dental School and donated approximately 175 specimens that would make up the pathological collection within the museum.

==== Charles Wilson ====
Charles Wilson (1842 – 1912) was the second curator of the Harvard Dental Museum and served from 1881 – 1891. He too served as an instructor at the Harvard Dental School.

==== Waldo E. Boardman ====
Although Waldo E. Boardman (1851 - 1922) was the third curator for the Harvard Dental Museum, he is perceived as the father of the museum. On June 18, 1891, Mr. Boardman was voted to be the third curator of the Harvard Dental Museum and would hold the position for the next thirty years. Mr. Boardman worked in the shoe business, patent solicitor, and newspaper solicitor before taking an interest in dentistry. He graduated from Harvard’s Dental School in 1886 and became an instructor in operative dentistry three years later. During his time as a curator he expanded numerous collections but did report a lack of adequate space and money to fully grow the museum to its potential. On August 14, 1922, Dr. Boardman’s time as a curator ceased when he died while traveling back home to Boston after attending a meeting for the American Dental Association in Los Angeles.

==== Adelbert Fernald ====
Adelbert Fernald was the fourth curator of the Harvard Dental Museum. Fernald worked under Boardman and assisted him in the library and with specimens. He took a special interest in preserving items related to the Dental School. In addition to expanding the collections, he updated the catalogs and proposed that the museum loan out specimens to instructors for their lectures. Like his predecessor, Fernald also faced the problem of a shortage of space, exhibition cases, and money. Many specimens collected by the museum were put into storage because of the lack of space. On February 9, 1925, Fernald he wrote the dean, Mr. Miner, asking for $800 to $1000 each year to buy new equipment. He retired at the age of 64.

==== Dr. Kurt H. Thoma ====
Dr. Kurt H. Thoma (1883 – 1972) was the final curator of the museum but did not start until April 1937 due to changes in policy and management. Dr. Thoma was an early graduate from Harvard School of Dental Medicine in 1911 and would become the Brackett Professor of Oral Pathology for the Harvard Dental School. He would also work at Massachusetts Hospital as the chief of Oral surgery.

=== Standing Committee of the Museum ===
The Standing Committee was formed in 1893 to assist the curator with their obligations and was in effect for the last three curators.

== Architecture ==
=== Museum Located at North Grove Street ===
The museum was initially meant to only serves a space for storage of materials used by instructors for the Harvard Dental School. The museum space on North Grove Street occupied a room on the second floor that spread over a space 54 feet long and seven feet wide. Within the room there were eight standing cabinets on a single wall for pathological, mechanical and other types of specimens. Another cabinet within the room is divided into ten smaller sections. Within three of these cabinets were specimens relating to comparative anatomy and an assortment of instruments. The specimen count within the museum stood between three thousand and four thousand.

=== Museum Located at Longwood Avenue ===
When the museum was moved to the second floor of a new building on Longwood Avenue, the museum was given a room encompassing three cabinets that stretched six feet long in addition to eight exhibition cases that lined the wall.

==== New Exhibition Cases ====
Despite the problems with space and financial matters, in 1910, Dr. Boardman was able to attain five new display cases for the museum. The new cases would consist of soft white ebonized quartered oak in which the inside of these cases would then be covered in fabric preferably unbleached linen. The final touches would include brackets that have a nickel plate finish or a “gunmetal finish.” The corners would have a bronze framework that was seven eighths of an inch thick while the points where the framework joined together were two and one-eighth inches thick. The cases also needed to have measures that would ensure pests were not able to enter them so they also had “poison patented dust proofing.” The cost for the metal cases would be $918 and the wood bases would total $528 for a grand total of $1446 which would have had to be paid within 30 days of all the work being completed and included delivery and setup.

== Notable artifacts ==
The Harvard Dental Museum acquired numerous artifacts throughout its duration. After the initial donation by Arthur Cabot, the specimens, tools and memorabilia grew to amount to over 3000 artifacts. Before its closing the collection totaled well over 14,000 specimens. The museum also served as a repository for dental student’s work: a requirement for their graduation was to submit a mold or tool they made or used during their matriculation. Many of these materials are still on display today in the Harvard Dental School teaching clinics.

=== The Mastodon Tusk ===
The Mastodon tusk was acquired by the Harvard Dental Museum in 1929. After a winter journey to Alaska, then curator Adelbert Fernald, discovered an 11-foot 2-inch long Mastodon tusk buried in a river bank. Fernald and his exploring party of worked for several days to release the tooth from the rock and snow. The 50,000-year-old tusk traveled via dog-sled and boat to Boston where it was weighed and inspected by the museum. The 300-pound tusk was housed at the Longwood Ave location of the Harvard Dental museum until the disassembly of the facility in 1937. After the museum was taken down, the tusk vanished. The Mastodon tusk is missing to this day.

=== World War I Soldier's Moulages ===
Under curator Adelbert Fernald, molds and instruments used in facial reconstructions during the Great War were contributed to the growing museum. Dr. Varaztad Kazanjian, known later as the “Miracle Man of the Western Front” treated soldiers in World War I that were disfigured on the front lines. Over 7000 artifacts were collected from Dr. Kazanjian’s duration in the First Harvard Unit in the British Forces. The collection, filled with plaster masks, photographs, X-Rays and war relics, was acquired by the Harvard Dental museum in 1923 expanding the collection to over 14,000 specimens. Following the disassembly of the Museum, the Warren Anatomical Museum at Harvard Medical School undertook the collection.

=== Replica of an 1822 Dental Office ===
Established by curator Adelbert Fernald, a replica of an 1822’s dentist office was incorporated into the Dental Museum during renovations at the Longwood Ave location in the 1920s. The replica was encased in glass and stood in the corner of the museum. The furniture and tools in the office came from the collection of Dr. John Randall. One of the highlights in the office was an original operating chair. Other artifacts included a dental key for extracting teeth and a workbench for carving replacement teeth from porcelain. The glass encasement allowed for viewers to gain a 180-degree view of the office.

=== George Parkman's Dentures ===
Dr. John White Webster was on trial for the murder of George Parkman in 1850 in the Supreme Judicial Court of Massachusetts. George Parkman went missing on November 23, 1849 and his remains were found later at Harvard Medical School in the Dr. Webster's laboratory. The dentures retrieved from the site were fashioned by Dr. Nathan Cooley Keep. Dr. Keep was originally a jeweler but eventually became a dental pioneer and prominent physician in Boston. He established the Harvard Dental School in 1867. As a trial witness, Dr. Keep recalled manufacturing the dentures for Dr. Parkman, "he teeth were brought to me, and I at once recognised them as the teeth which I had made for Dr. Parkman and with which I had taken so much pains…. There could be no mistake about them." With this account and evidence entered in the trial, Dr. Webster was convicted of the murder and was executed on August 30, 1850. This was one of the first cases using dental evidence to solve a murder by identifying the victim.

== Dismantling the museum ==
The museum was dismantled between 1938 and 1939. In the Announcement of the Dental School of Harvard University of 1937–1938 there is still mention of a curator and visiting hours of the museum. However, in the 1939–1940 Announcement there is no mention of the museum. The curator in 1937–1938, Kurt H. Thoma, remained on the staff of the dental school in 1939–1940 as the Charles A. Brackett Professor of Oral Pathology. It was reported that the museum closed to make space for research laboratories and classrooms. There was no official notice or announcement pertaining to its closing. Only a few of the artifacts were recovered by the Warren Anatomical Museum at Harvard Medical School.
