= Harvard School of Dental Medicine =

Dental school in Boston, Massachusetts, US

Coordinates: 42.336095°N 71.102126°W

- Coat of arms
- Former name: Harvard Dental School
- Type: Private
- Established: July 17, 1867; 159 years ago
- Parent institution: Harvard University
- Dean: William Giannobile
- Doctoral students: 280
- Location: Boston, Massachusetts, United States
- Website: hsdm.harvard.edu

The Harvard School of Dental Medicine (HSDM) is the dental school of Harvard University. It is located in the Longwood Medical Area in Boston, Massachusetts. In addition to the DMD degree, HSDM offers specialty training programs, advanced training programs, and a PhD program through the Harvard Graduate School of Arts and Sciences. The program considers dentistry a specialty of medicine. Therefore, all students at HSDM experience dual citizenship between Harvard School of Dental Medicine and Harvard Medical School. Today, HSDM is the smallest school at Harvard University with a total student body of 280.

== History ==
=== First university-based dental school ===
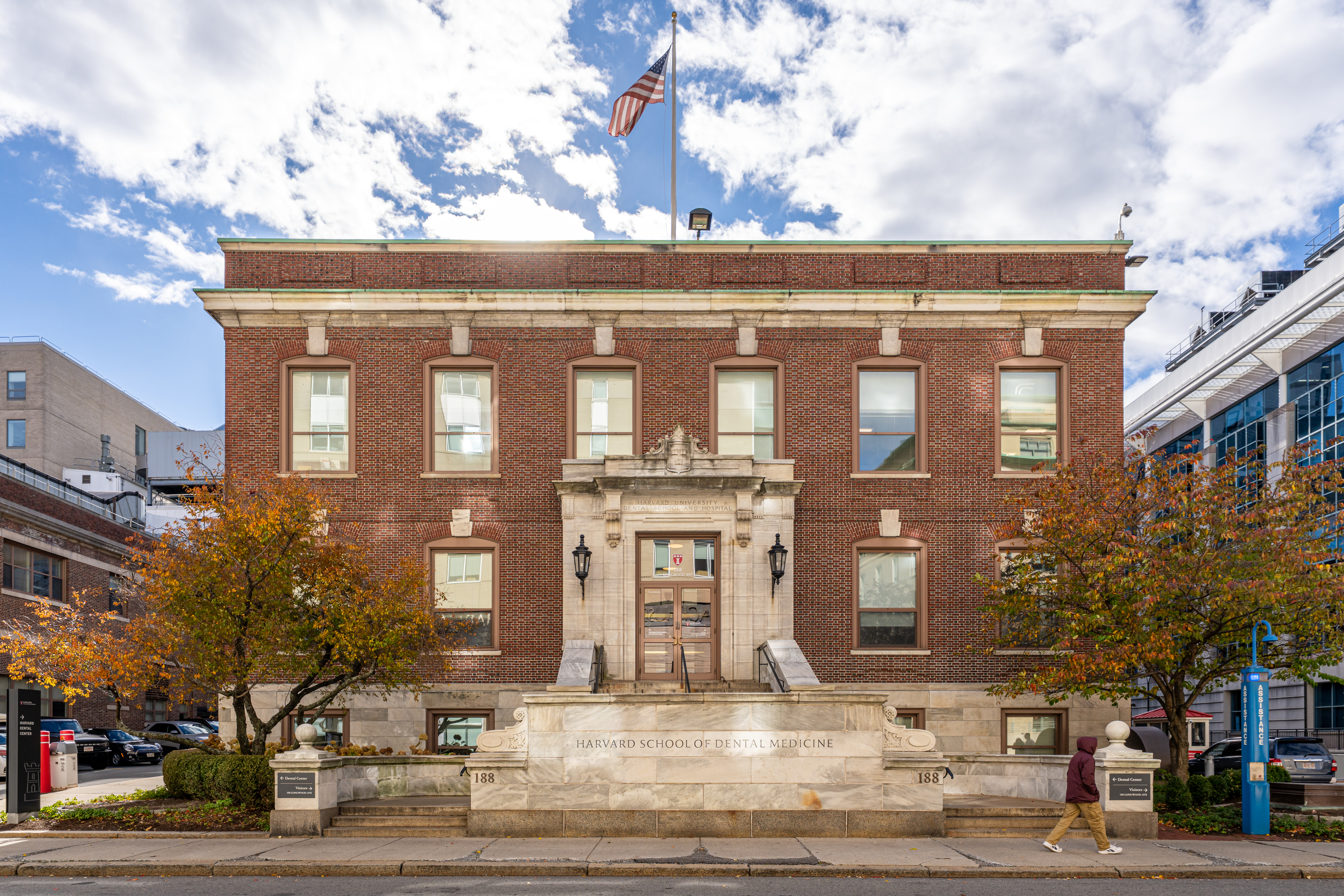
Harvard School of Dental Medicine

In the early 19th century, a dentist was culturally understood as a tradesman, as opposed to a professional in the medical sense. Most dentists had either learned their trade through apprenticeships or simply offered their services to the public as self-proclaimed experts.

Even physicians and surgeons had once been tradesmen; for example, in the Middle Ages, many barbers were also surgeons by trade. The advent of science was a principal factor in the professionalization of medicine and surgery, because as scientific knowledge of biology, chemistry, and physiology advanced, it became necessary to be educated academically in order to master the full body of knowledge in medicine; as medicine changed from an art to a mixture of applied science and art, it became something qualitatively different from the folk medicine or traditional medicine that it had earlier been.

A similar evolution happened in dentistry, as dentists today are required to understand a large amount of oral medicine to earn license to practice. The move toward more formal dental education and the professionalization of dentistry in the United States began when the state of Maryland chartered the Baltimore College of Dental Surgery in 1840. The establishment of this independent college, which may have occurred after the University of Maryland refused to add dental education to its curriculum, exemplified the nineteenth-century debate over whether dentistry should be part of scholarly education or should be taught in separate trade schools. As a result of this resistance, the various American dental schools that existed by 1866 were all freestanding (not university-affiliated). They included the aforementioned Baltimore College of Dental Surgery (1840), the Ohio College of Dental Surgery (1845), the Philadelphia College of Dental Surgery (1852), the New York College of Dentistry (1852), the Philadelphia Dental College (1863), and the Missouri Dental College (1866).

The move towards university-based dental education institutions (as they exist today) began with the formation of Harvard Dental School in 1867. Reidar Fauske Sognnaes, noted oral pathologist and founding dean of the UCLA School of Dentistry, commented on the significance of the school's formation in a 1977 New England Journal of Medicine article:

There was a time when the mouth, relatively speaking, was considered a scientific "no-man's land." That was when dental education fell between academic chairs--literally between the eyes, ears, nose and throat. In the United States dentistry was denied the academic status of other segments of higher education until 1867, when Harvard established the first dental school affiliated with a university-based faculty of medicine.

=== Origins of DMD degree ===
Harvard was the first dental school to award the DMD degree. The establishment of the degree is detailed at Dental degree § DDS vs DMD degree. There is no difference between the DMD and DDS degree; all dentists must meet the same national and regional certification standards.

=== Renaming the school ===
The school was established as Harvard Dental School in 1867, but renamed the Harvard School of Dental Medicine in 1940. This symbolic change was made to emphasize the biological basis of oral medicine and the increasingly multidisciplinary focus of dental research.

=== Expansion of postdoctoral educational programs ===
In 1957, Harvard School of Dental Medicine was awarded a training grant from the National Institute of Dental Research (now the National Institute of Dental and Craniofacial Research) to expand its postdoctoral training programs. These new programs included an oral and maxillofacial surgery/MD/general surgery residency program; a Doctor of Medical Sciences (DMSc) degree; and 3- and 4-year joint-degree programs with an emphasis on combining clinical training with research into health policy, public health, and/or biomedical sciences.

The school's current post-doctoral programs include both school-based and hospital based residencies. School-based programs award the Master of Medical Science (MMSc) degree, with an optional Doctor of Medical Sciences (DMSc) degree available for those spending extra time on research activities.

=== Harvard Odontological Society ===
The Harvard Odontological Society was established in 1878 to promote education and good fellowship amongst graduates and faculty of the Harvard School of Dental Medicine. In continuous operation for over 130 years, the society meets four times a year in a Boston, Massachusetts venue to hold a regular business meeting and an educational presentation of interest to its members.

=== Harvard Dental Alumni Association ===
The Harvard School of Dental Medicine has an active group of over 2500 alumni who continue to participate in the day-to-day events of the school and are major contributors to the school's vision and goals for the new millennium. In addition to publishing a quarterly bulletin, marking the current events of the school as well as the achievements of alumni, the Association also sponsors the annual Gold Medal and Silver Medal awards at graduation, honoring the valedictorian and salutatorian of the graduating class, respectively.

== Education ==
=== School-based programs ===
- Doctor of Dental Medicine (DMD)
- Orthodontics
- Endodontics
- Prosthodontics
- Periodontics
- Dental Public Health

=== Hospital-based programs ===
- Oral and Maxillofacial Surgery at Massachusetts General Hospital and Boston Children's Hospital, with MD degree awarded from Harvard Medical School
- Pediatric Dentistry at Boston Children's Hospital
- General Practice Residency at Massachusetts General Hospital, Cambridge Health Alliance, or the Veterans Administration Hospital

=== Changes in predoctoral curriculum in 1994 ===
In 1994, a major change in the predoctoral curriculum included an increase of the predoctoral class size to 35, introduction of problem-based curriculum, and a switch from a 5-year program to a 4-year case-based curriculum.

== Early graduates ==
- Varaztad Kazanjian, pioneer in plastic surgery, Harvard's first Professor of Plastic Surgery, DMD 1905
- Robert Tanner Freeman, first African-American graduate, DMD 1869
- Nathan Cooley Keep, founder and first Dean of Harvard Dental School, DMD 1870 (Honorary)
- George Franklin Grant, first African-American faculty member at Harvard University, DMD 1870
- Kurt Hermann Thoma, founder of American Board of Pathology, DMD 1911

== Affiliated organizations ==
- American Student Dental Association
- Harvard Odontological Society

== See also ==
- Harvard Dental Museum
