= Varaztad Kazanjian =

Armenian academic (1879–1974)

- Born: March 18, 1879; Erzincan, Ottoman Empire
- Died: October 19, 1974 (aged 95); Belmont, Massachusetts
- Citizenship: American
- Education: Harvard School of Dental Medicine
- Occupation: Oral surgeon
- Known for: founder of the modern practice of plastic surgery

Varaztad H. Kazanjian (Armenian: Վարազդատ Գազանճեան, March 18, 1879 – October 19, 1974) was an Armenian American oral surgeon who pioneered techniques for plastic surgery and is considered to be the founder of the modern practice of plastic surgery. He graduated from Harvard School of Dental Medicine in 1905. He served as Professor of Oral Surgery from 1922 to 1939 and he was the first to hold the title of Professor of Plastic Surgery at Harvard Medical School. He also co-authored the first concise book on plastic surgery.

== Biography ==
Varaztad Kazanjian was born in Erzincan, Ottoman Empire on March 18, 1879. In 1879, he attended a French Jesuit school in the city of Sivas. Thereafter, he moved to Samsun to live with his older half-brother. While in Samsun, he worked with his brother but eventually worked in a post office. In an attempt to escape the massacres of Armenians in the Ottoman Empire, he left for the United States in October 1895 and settled in Worcester, Massachusetts, and took a job in the local wire factory. It was at the mill that Dr. Kazanjian first displayed the natural dexterity that would serve him well in the field of plastic surgery.

After attaining United States citizenship in 1900, he decided to try for a career as a dentist, and in 1902 was accepted by Harvard Dental School, qualifying in 1905.

Kazanjian's niece (brother's daughter) was actress and television celebrity Arlene Francis (Kazanjian-Gabel).

== First World War ==
He was married and successfully running his own dental practice when the First World War broke out, but he volunteered to join the Harvard Medical Corps, posted to a huge tented hospital complex in Camiers, France where he served British forces. There he began to treat some of the worst injuries suffered in trench war-fare - jaws, noses, cheeks and skulls shattered by bullets and grenades. Working under primitive conditions in makeshift hospitals near the battlefields of France, Varaztad H. Kazanjian exhibited humane concern combined with innovative medical procedures that established his reputation and marked his subsequent career as a founder of the modern practice of plastic surgery. He was subsequently promoted to the rank of major in June 1916.

== Career ==
Kazanjian was Professor of Clinical Oral Surgery at Harvard from 1922 to 1941 when he was named Harvard's first Professor of Plastic Surgery. In addition, Dr. Kazanjian was past President of the American Association of Plastic Surgeons, the American Society of Maxillofacial Surgery, and the New England Society of Plastic and Reconstructive Surgery. He was also a Fellow of the American College of Surgeons, the American Academy of Ophthalmology and Otolaryngology, and the American College of Dentists, and a diplomate of the American Board of Plastic Surgery. He was made an Honorary Fellow of the British Association of Plastic Surgeons in London in 1966 and of the Royal College of Physicians and Surgeons in Glasgow in 1967. He was also an honorary member of the Massachusetts Dental Society, the American Society of Plastic and Reconstructive Surgery, and of the Academy of Oral Surgery.

== Awards and recognition ==
He was awarded several awards including the Order of St Michael and St George by the King George V of the United Kingdom. In 1951, he was awarded the Honorary Award of the American Society of Plastic and Reconstructive Surgeons.
