= Journal of Oral and Maxillofacial Surgery =

- Discipline: Oral and maxillofacial surgery
- Language: English
- Edited by: James R. Hupp

Publication details
- History: 1943-present
- Publisher: Elsevier for the American Association of Oral and Maxillofacial Surgeons (United States)
- Frequency: Monthly
- Impact factor: 1.895 (2020)

Standard abbreviations
- ISO 4: J. Oral Maxillofac. Surg.

Indexing
- CODEN: JOMSDA
- ISSN: 0278-2391 (print); 1531-5053 (web)
- LCCN: 82644523
- OCLC no.: 07757702

Links
- Journal homepage; Journal page at Elsevier website; Online access

The Journal of Oral and Maxillofacial Surgery is a peer-reviewed medical journal that publishes original research in oral and maxillofacial surgery, oral pathology, and other related topics. It is published monthly by Elsevier on behalf of the American Association of Oral and Maxillofacial Surgeons. The current editor-in-chief is James R. Hupp and associate editor is Thomas Dodson.

Another journal is Oral and Maxillofacial Surgery published by Springer, started at 1997.
