= University of Monastir =

University in Tunisia

- جامعة المنستير
- Motto in English: Let's work for the future
- Type: Public
- Established: 2004
- Affiliations: Agence universitaire de la Francophonie
- President: Pr. Hedi BEL HADJ SALAH
- Faculty: 6
- Administrative staff: 559
- Students: 22,577
- Location: Monastir, Tunisia; 35°46′16″N 10°49′31″E
- Campus: urban
- Website: http://www.um.rnu.tn

The University of Monastir (Arabic: جامعة المنستير) or UM is a Tunisian multidisciplinary university with its own financial and administrative autonomy located in Monastir, Tunisia. It was founded in 2004 following the reform of the university higher education system and is organized in 5 Faculties, 2 graduate schools and 9 institutes.

Its main activities are related to higher education, learning and research in a broad sense, with the aim of decentralizing services, supervising and improving the profitability of the higher education system.

With approximately 27,500 students, 2,044 lecturers and 758 administrative and support staff, the University of Monastir offers a wide range of undergraduate and postgraduate courses, with an average graduate count of approximately 4,700 per year.

It is ranked by U.S. News & World Report as 18th in the 2016 Arab Universities Regional Ranking. According to UniRank, the university ranks third in Tunisia. In 2020, the university ranked 301-400 globally and the first nationally in the "Energy Science & Engineering" field according to the ShanghaiRanking's Global Ranking of Academic Subjects 2020.

== History ==
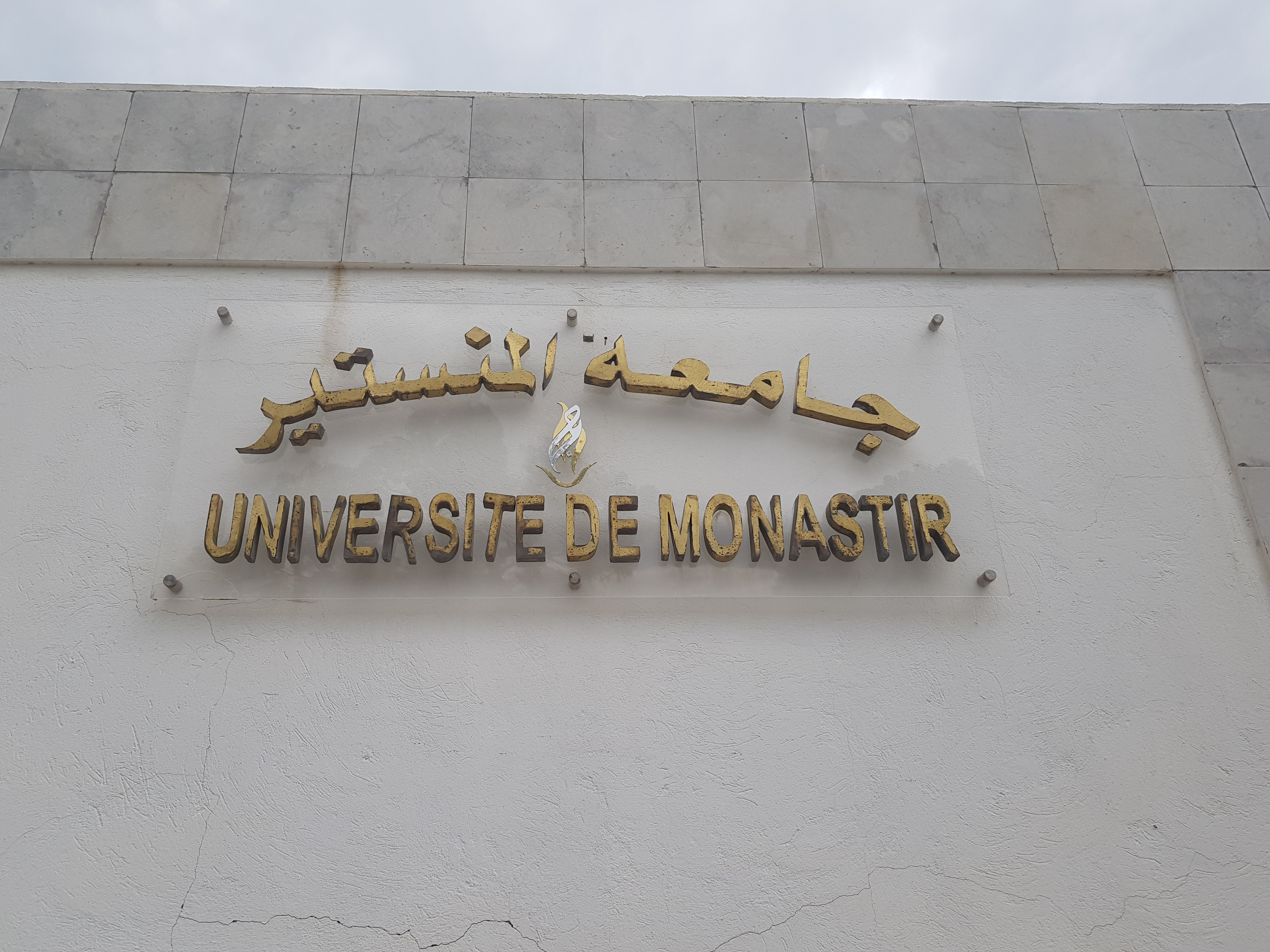
Logo of the university

The University of Monastir was created by Law No. 86-80 of August 9, 1986, and became the University of the Center in accordance with the provisions of Decree No. 91-1991 of December 31, 1991. It then supervised educational institutions in the governorates of Monastir, Sousse, Kairouan and Mahdia.

Following the reform of the university higher education system, there is a return to the old name in accordance with Decree No. 2102 of 2 September 2004 establishing the current University of Monastir.

== Location ==
The establishment is located on Tahar-Haddad Avenue in Monastir, near the Higher Institute of Biotechnology, the Faculty of Dentistry and that of Pharmacy.

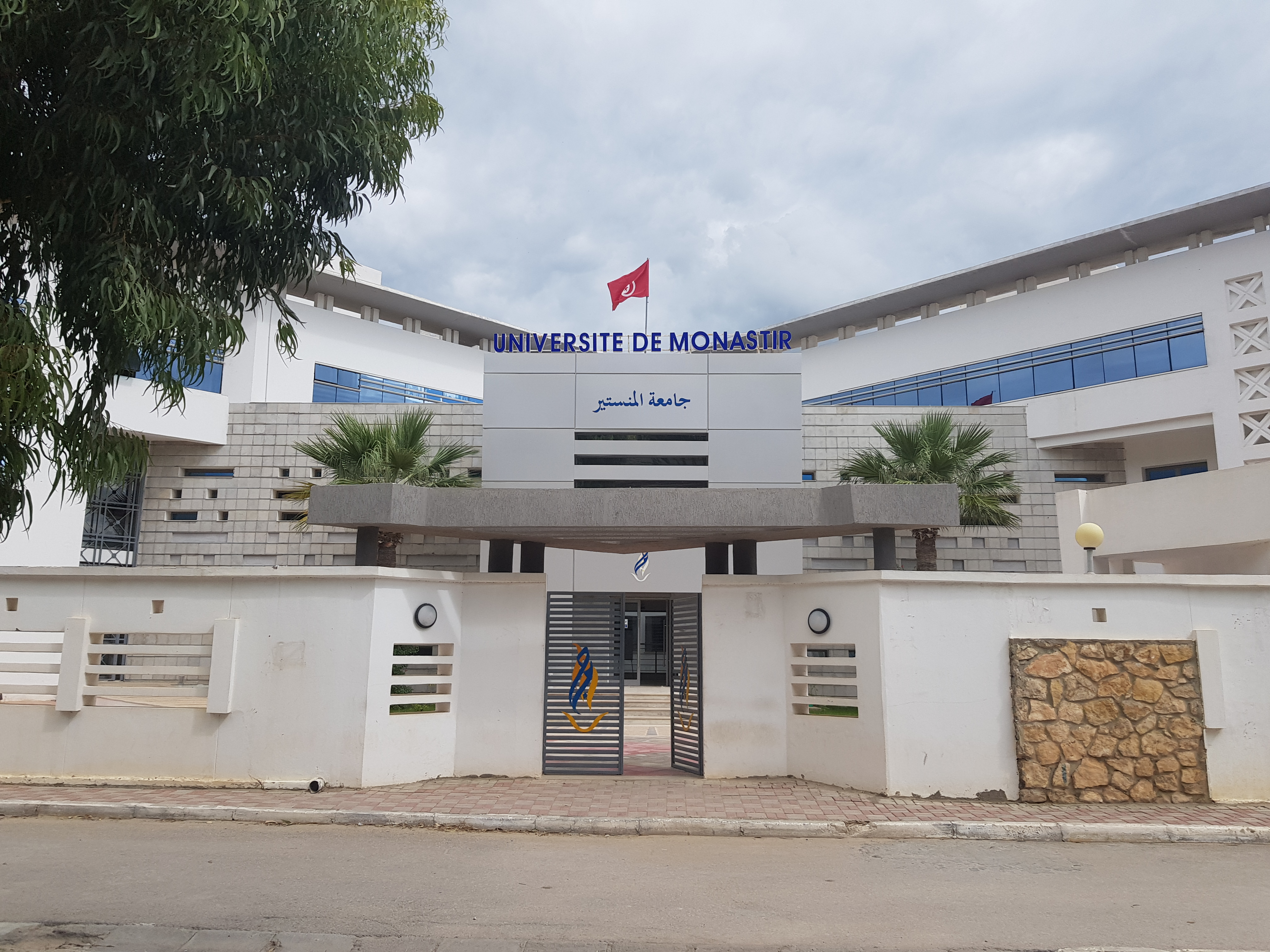
Frontal view of the university of Monastir

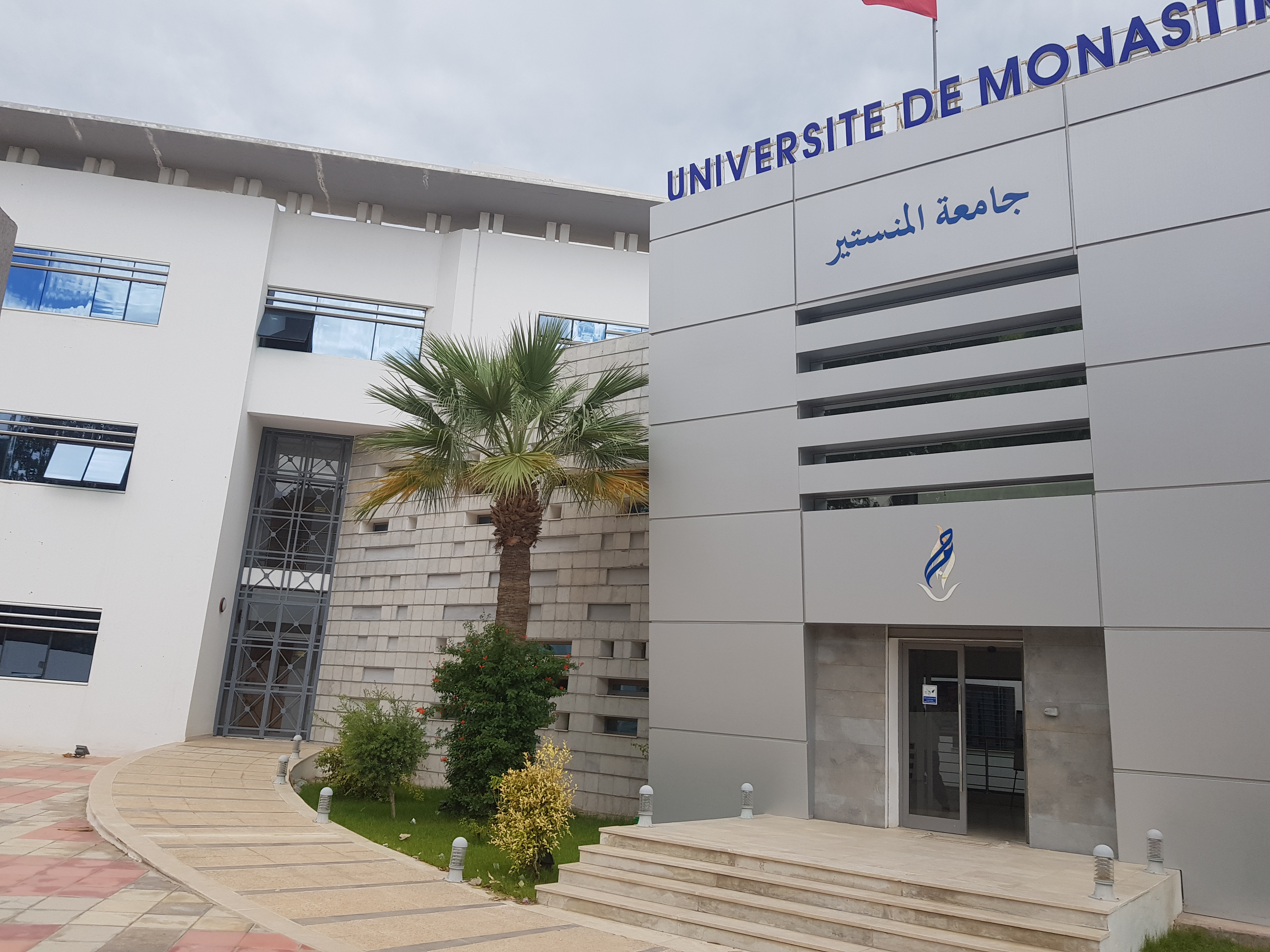
Entry of the university

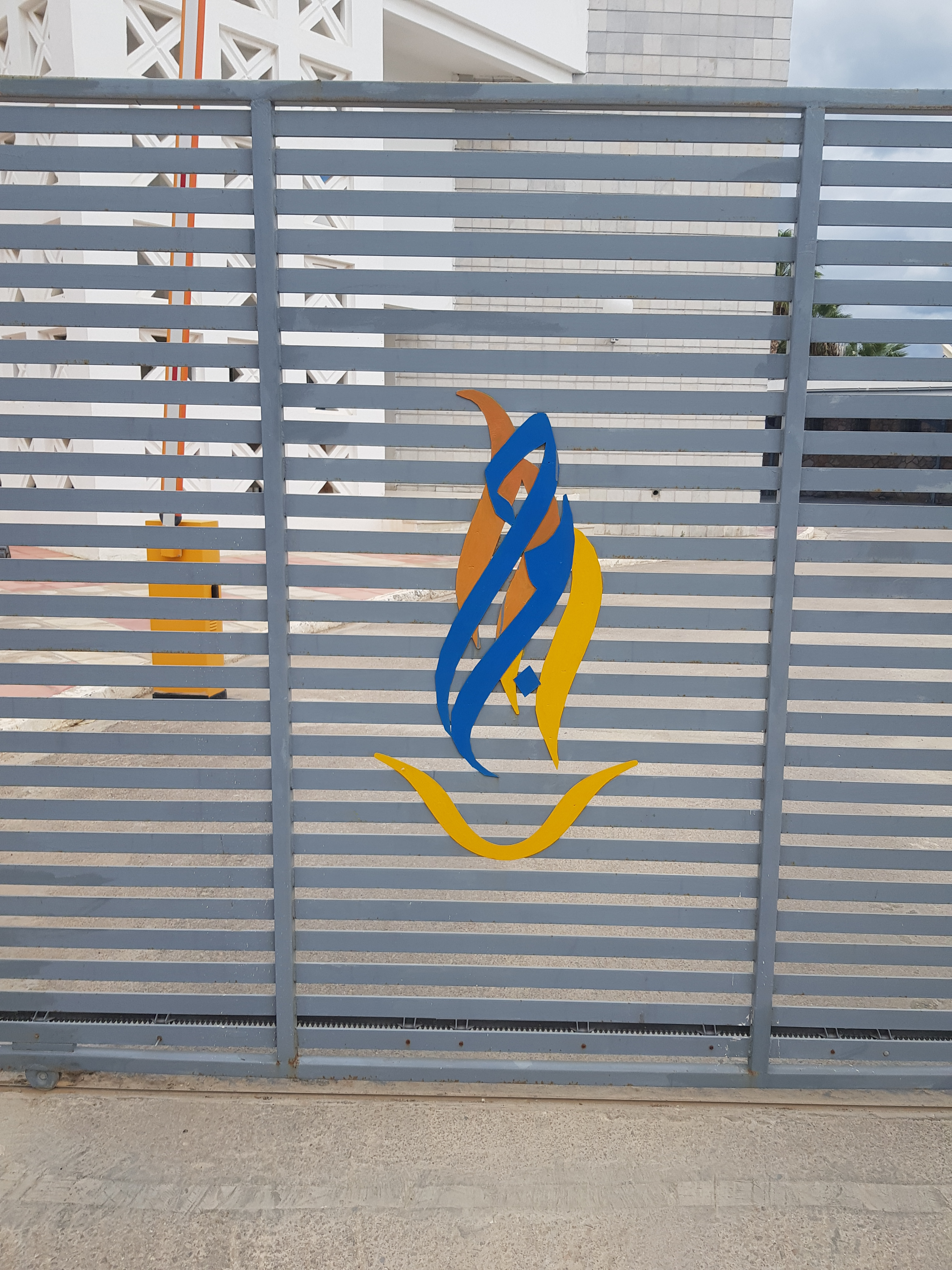
Portal

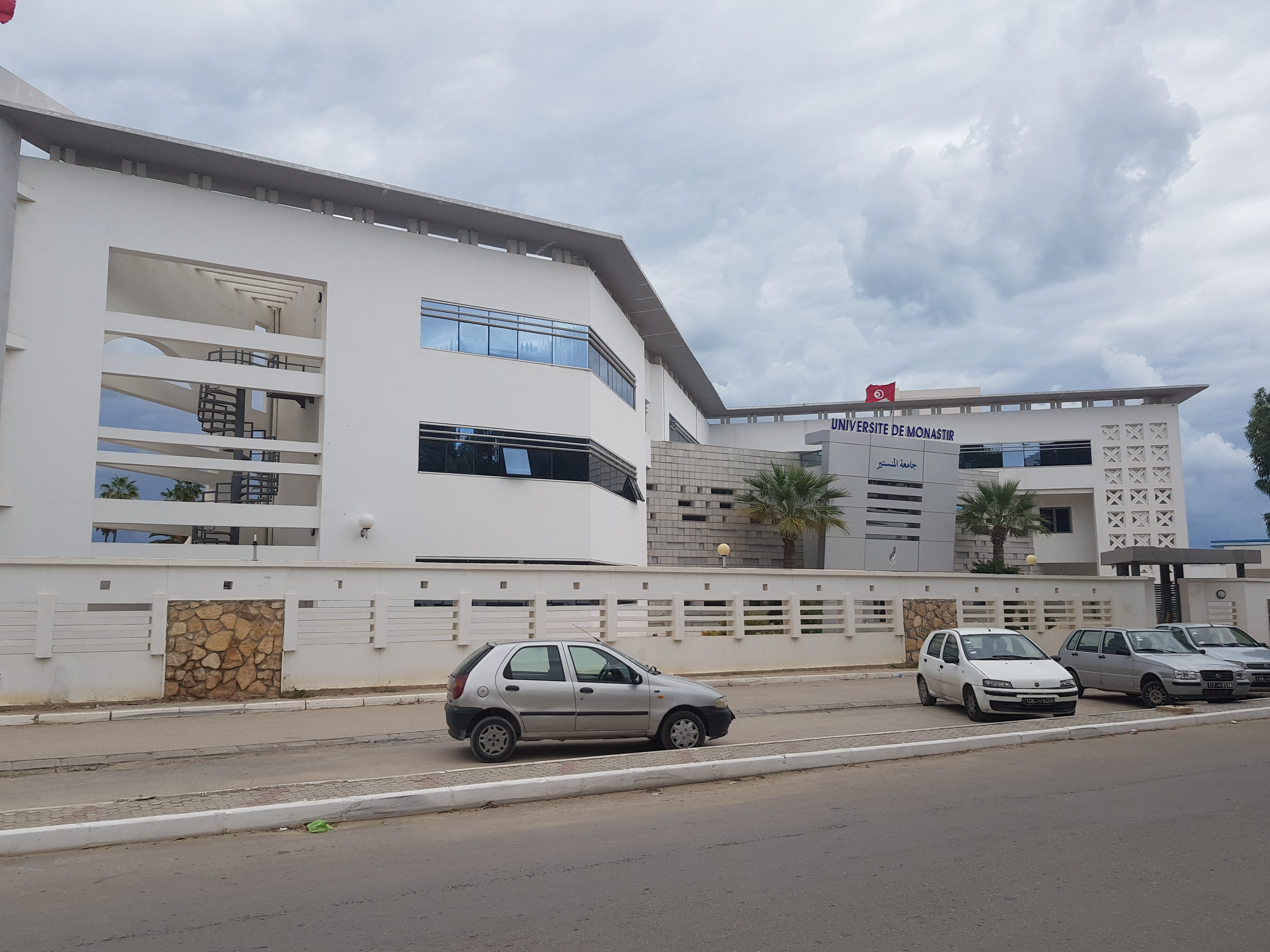
View from the avenue Tahar-Haddad

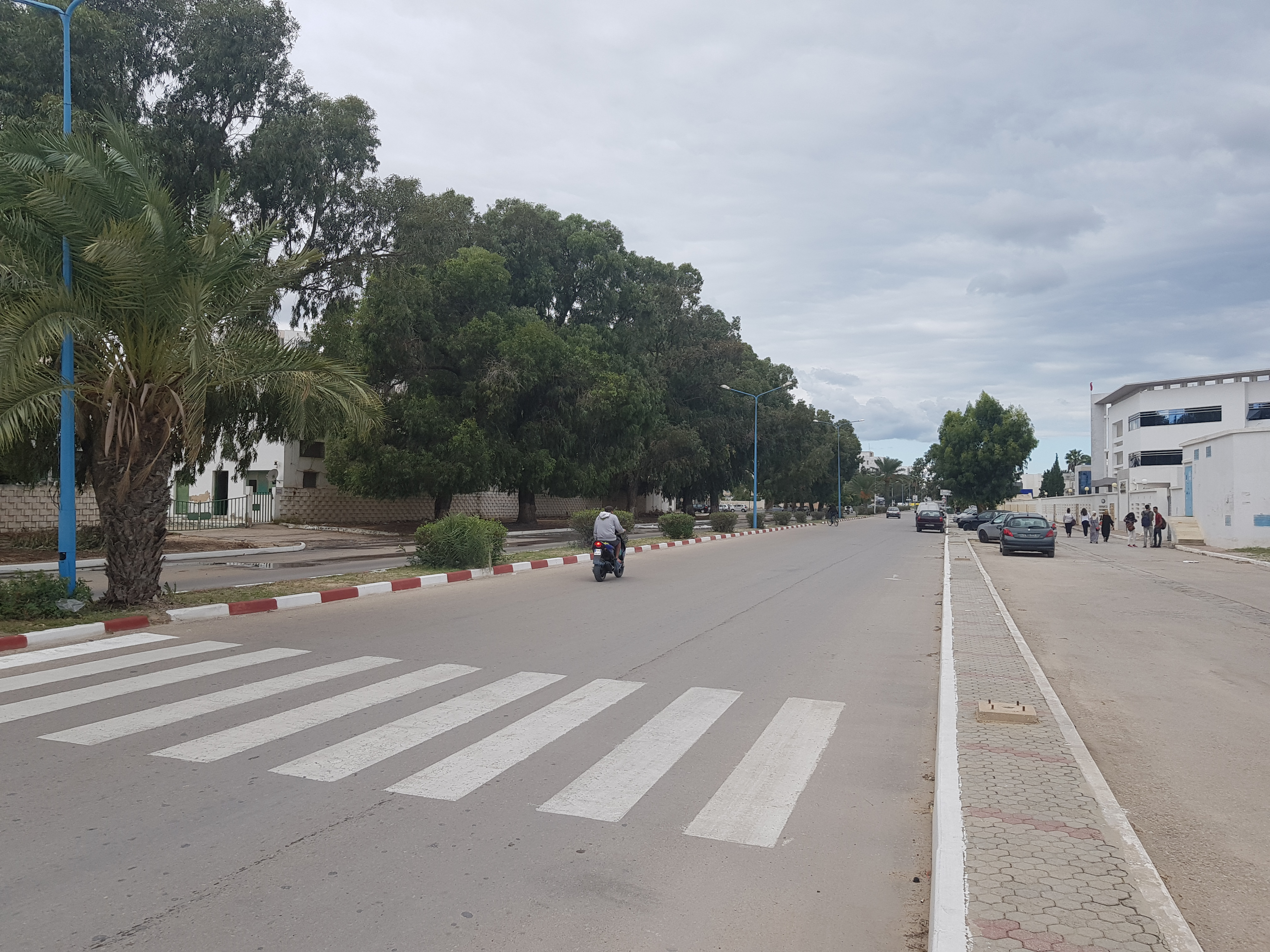
Avenue Tahar-Haddad in front of the university

== Organization ==
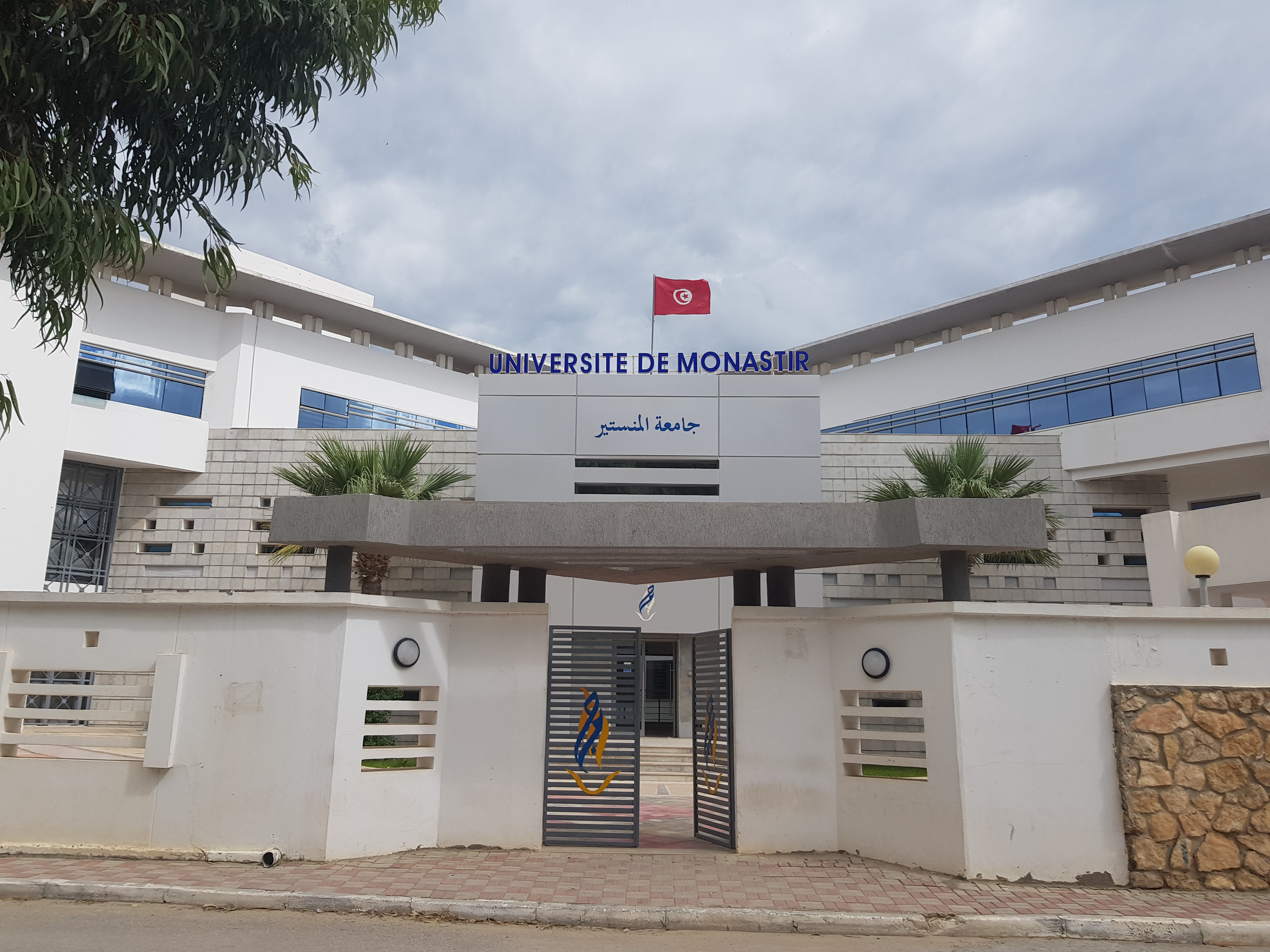
University of Monastir

It includes sixteen university establishments (five faculties, two schools and nine institutes) distributed between the governorates of Monastir and Mahdia.

=== Faculties ===
- Faculty of Sciences of Monastir;
- Faculty of Medicine of Monastir;
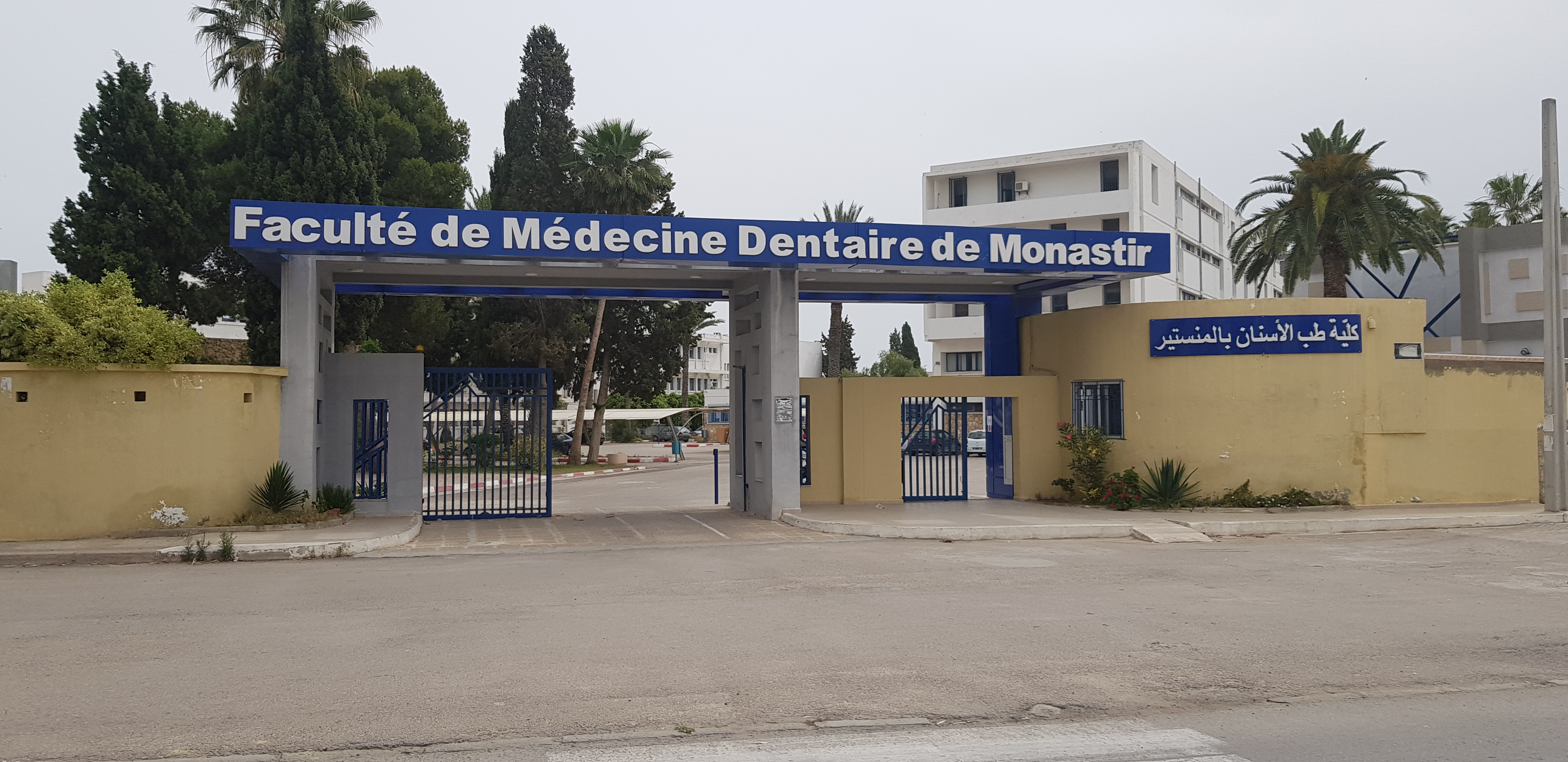
- Faculty of Dental Medecine of Monastir
  Faculty of Dental Medicine of Monastir;
- Faculty of Pharmacy of Monastir;
- Faculty of Economics and Management of Mahdia;

=== Graduate schools ===
- National Engineering School of Monastir;
- Graduate School of Health Sciences and Technologies of Monastir;

=== Higher Institutes ===
- Higher Institute of Biotechnology of Monastir;
- Preparatory Institute for Engineering Studies of Monastir;
- Higher Institute of Computer Science and Mathematics of Monastir;
- Higher Institute of Applied Languages for Business and Tourism of Moknine;
- Higher Institute of Computer Science of Mahdia;
- Higher Institute of Applied Science and Technology of Mahdia;
- Higher Institute of Arts and Crafts of Mahdia;
- Higher Institute of Applied Studies in the Humanities of Mahdia;
- Higher Institute of Fashion Trades of Monastir;

== Fields of study ==
The University of Monastir is an active institution in the fields of pharmaceutical studies and dental surgery, as well as design and fashion. The distribution of students among these subjects during the 2010–2011 academic year is as follows: clinical and pharmaceutical studies (4,895 students), engineering (4,109 students), computer and communication (3,888 students) and basic sciences ( 3,774 students).

- Fundamental sciences;
- Information and Communication Technologies (ICTs);
- Paramedical sciences;
- Languages and Humanities;
- Arts and Crafts;
- Economics and Management;
- Biological and Biotechnology Sciences;
- Medical and Pharmaceutical Sciences;
- Engineering Sciences;

== Cursus ==
The university offers three study models:

- LMD training:
  - Applied or fundamental Bachelor (three years);
  - Professional or research Masters (two years);
  - Doctorate (three years);
- Engineering studies:
  - Preparatory cycle (two years);
  - Engineering studies (three years);
- Medical studies :
  - Dental and pharmaceutical studies (six to ten years);
  - Medical studies (six to eleven).

The University of Monastir adapted the LMD system during the 2005–2006 academic year (except for medical and engineering studies).

== Scientific research ==
The institution is considered to be the main university research center in the Sahel region. Its research policy is defined and implemented by the Vice-President of Research. More than 950 doctoral students carry out research activities at the University of Monastir, mainly in the fields of biological and medical sciences, and of engineering and exact sciences. Its more than fifty research units and 25 laboratories carry out research under the supervision of four doctoral schools.

The university represents the third research pole in Tunisia with its accredited research structures:

- 26 research laboratories;
- 78 research units;
- 4 doctoral schools.

Scientific production is increasing starting from the year 2009 and reached 1,469 publications in 2014 in the form of doctoral theses, master's theses, indexed and non-indexed publications, patents and joint supervision supported.

== National and international relations ==
=== Cooperation ===
The University of Monastir is a member of international networks and associations such as the Agence universitaire de la Francophonie and participates in a large number of national and international projects funded by different programs such as CMCU, INSERM, TEMPUS and INTERREG.

==== Networks ====
- TEMPUS;
- Erasmus Mundus;
- Erasmus +;
- Horizon 2020.

==== Bilateral projects ====
Partnership with foreign universities:

- Framework agreements:
  - Algeria (4)
  - Germany (3)
  - Saudi Arabia (1)
  - Canada (2)
  - Spain (2)
  - France (19)
  - Italy (4)
  - Libya (1)
  - Lebanon (1)
  - Madagascar (1)
  - Morocco (1)
  - Portugal (1)
  - Turkey (1)
  - Ukraine (1)
  - Czech Republic (1)
  - Belgium (1)
  - China (1);
- Co-supervision agreements.

This openness to the international dimension of the university is illustrated by its policy of cooperation with regard to education and research and by its effort in implementing mobility for students, academic staff and researchers. In addition, around 1% of its total student population is foreign.

== See also ==
- List of colleges and universities
- Monastir
