= Oral Surgery, Oral Medicine, Oral Pathology, and Oral Radiology =

Medical journal

- Discipline: Oral and maxillofacial surgery, oral pathology, oral radiology, endodontics
- Language: English
- Edited by: Mark W. Lingen

Publication details
- Former names: Oral Surgery, Oral Medicine, Oral Pathology; Oral Surgery, Oral Medicine, Oral Pathology, Oral Radiology, and Endodontology;
- History: 1948-present
- Publisher: Mosby
- Frequency: Monthly
- Impact factor: 2.589 (2020)

Standard abbreviations
- ISO 4: Oral Surg. Oral Med. Oral Pathol. Oral Radiol.

Indexing
- ISSN: 2212-4403 (print); 2212-4411 (web)
- OCLC no.: 768841773

Links
- Journal homepage; Online access

Oral Surgery, Oral Medicine, Oral Pathology, and Oral Radiology is a monthly peer-reviewed medical journal that covers research in oral surgery, medicine, pathology, radiology, and endodontics published by Mosby. It was originally established as Oral Surgery, Oral Medicine, and Oral Pathology in 1948, changing its name to Oral Surgery, Oral Medicine, Oral Pathology, Oral Radiology, and Endodontology in 1995, and acquiring its current name in 2012. It is an official journal of the American College of Oral and Maxillofacial Surgery, American Academy of Oral and Maxillofacial Radiology, American Academy of Oral Medicine, and the American Academy of Oral and Maxillofacial Pathology. According to the Journal Citation Reports, the journal has a 2020 impact factor of 2.589.
