= Sahline station =

Railway station in Monastir, Tunisia

Sahline
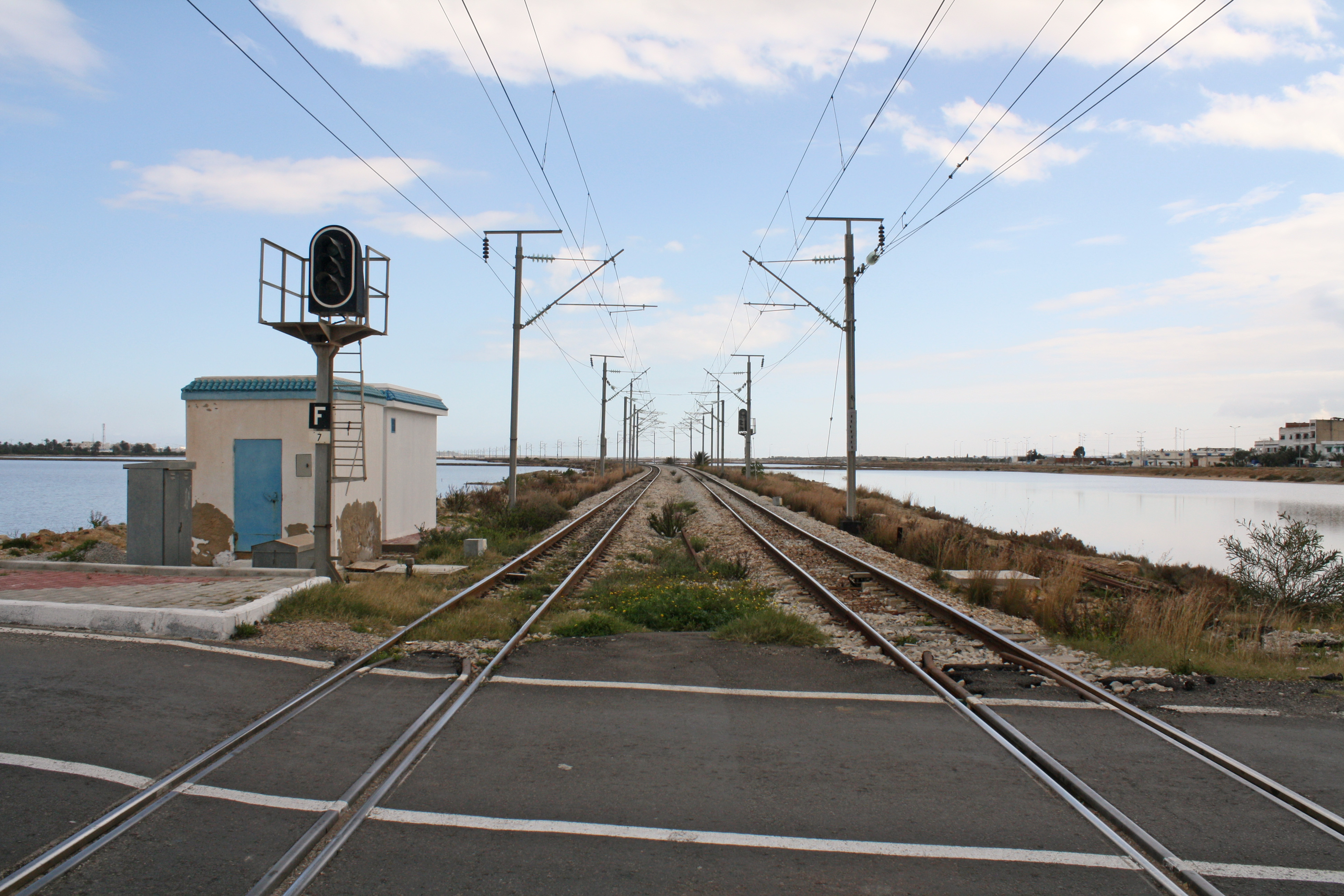
- The road to Sahline station

General information
- Location: Monastir; Tunisia
- Coordinates: 35.757526°N 10.716716°E
- Operator: Société Nationale des Chemins de Fer Tunisiens
- Platforms: 2

Construction
- Platform levels: 1
Location

Sahline is a railway station on the outskirts of Monastir, Tunisia. It is operated by the Société Nationale des Chemins de Fer Tunisiens.

The station sits among lagoons used for the extraction of salt. Trains from the station run on the electrified, metre-gauge Sahel Metro line and serve Sousse to the north.

The station lies between the Sousse-Industrial Zone to the west and Sahline Sebkha to the east.
