= La Faculté =

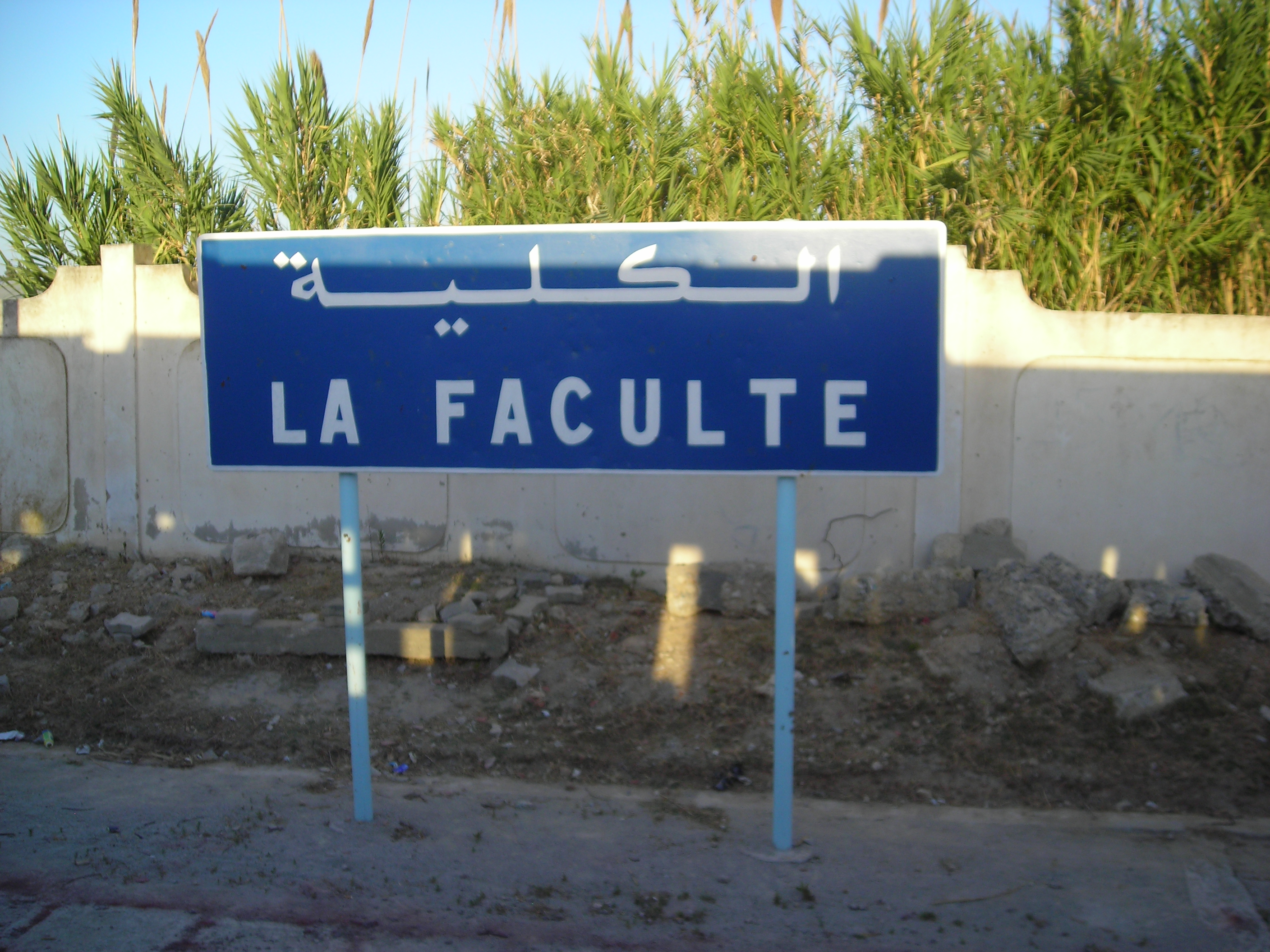
- Station sign, in 2012

General information
- Location: Monastir; Tunisia
- Coordinates: 35.760120°N 10.808017°E
- System: Junction station
- Operator: Société Nationale des Chemins de Fer Tunisiens
- Platforms: 4

Construction
- Platform levels: 1
Location

La Faculté is a railway station in Monastir, Tunisia. It is operated by the Société Nationale des Chemins de Fer Tunisiens.

The station's platforms are on two sides of a triangular railway junction. Trains from the station run on the electrified, metre-gauge Sahel Metro line and serve Sousse to the north and Mahdia to the south, as well as Monastir.

The station lies between Skanes-Monastir airport station to the west, the city-centre Gare Habib Bourguiba Monastir to the east, and Monastir Industrial Zone to the south.
