= Skanes-Monastir airport railway station =

Railway station in Tunisia

Skanes-Monastir airport

General information
- Location: Monastir; Tunisia
- Coordinates: 35.762506°N 10.754418°E
- Operator: Société Nationale des Chemins de Fer Tunisiens
- Platforms: 2

Construction
- Platform levels: 1
Location

Skanes-Monastir airport is a railway station in Monastir, Tunisia. It is operated by the Société Nationale des Chemins de Fer Tunisiens.

The station serves Monastir Habib Bourguiba International Airport. Trains from the station run on the electrified, metre-gauge Sahel Metro line and serve Sousse to the north.

The station lies between the Hotels Monastir to the west and Faculty Monastir to the east.
