= Gare Mahdia =

Railway station in Mahdia, Tunisia

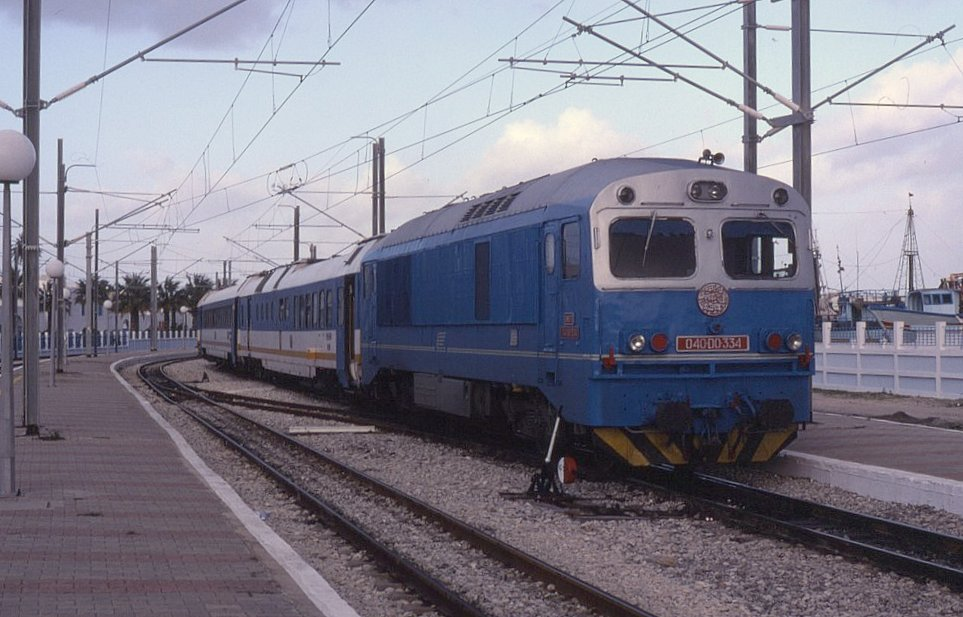
- Gare Mahdia.

General information
- Location: Mahdia; Tunisia
- Coordinates: 35.500833°N 11.064544°E
- System: Terminus
- Operator: Société Nationale des Chemins de Fer Tunisiens

Construction
- Platform levels: 1
Location

Gare Mahdia is a railway station in Mahdia, Tunisia, forming the southern terminus of the electrified, metre-gauge Sahel Metro line. It is operated by the Société Nationale des Chemins de Fer Tunisiens.

Trains from the station run north to Monastir and Sousse. The first station reached is Mahdia Ezzahra.
