= Ribat of Monastir =

Fort in Tunisia

Coordinates: 35.7761°N 10.8329°E

Ribat of Monastir رباط المنستير
- Monastir, Tunisia
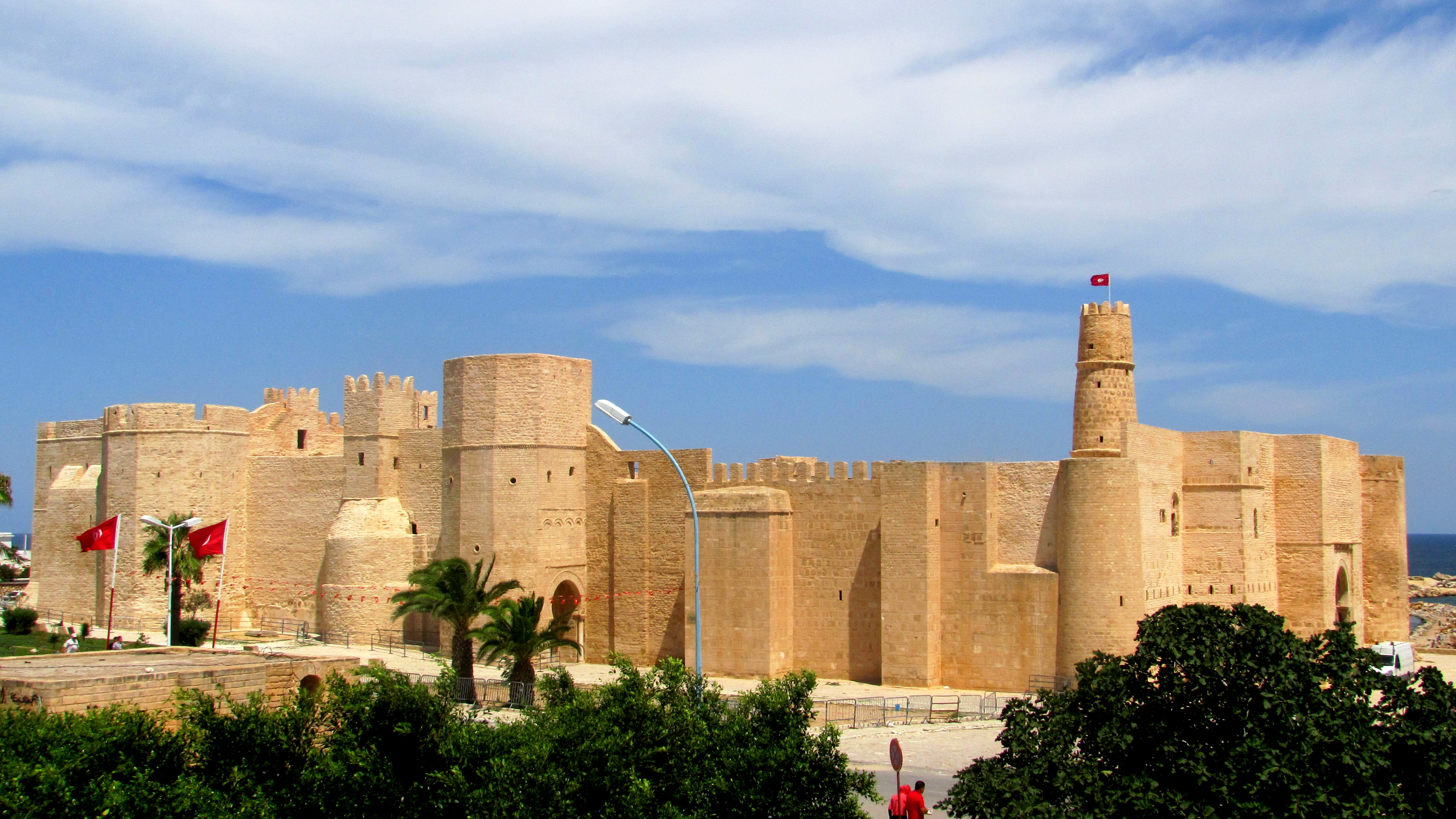

Site information
- Type: Abbasid Ribat
- Condition: Intact

Site history
- Built: 796
- Built by: Harthama ibn A'yan

The Ribat of Monastir (Arabic: رباط المنستير) is a ribat, an Islamic defensive structure, in Monastir, Tunisia. It is the oldest ribat built by the Arab conquerors during the Muslim conquest of the Maghreb. It is also the most prominent monument of the city of Monastir.

== History and architecture ==
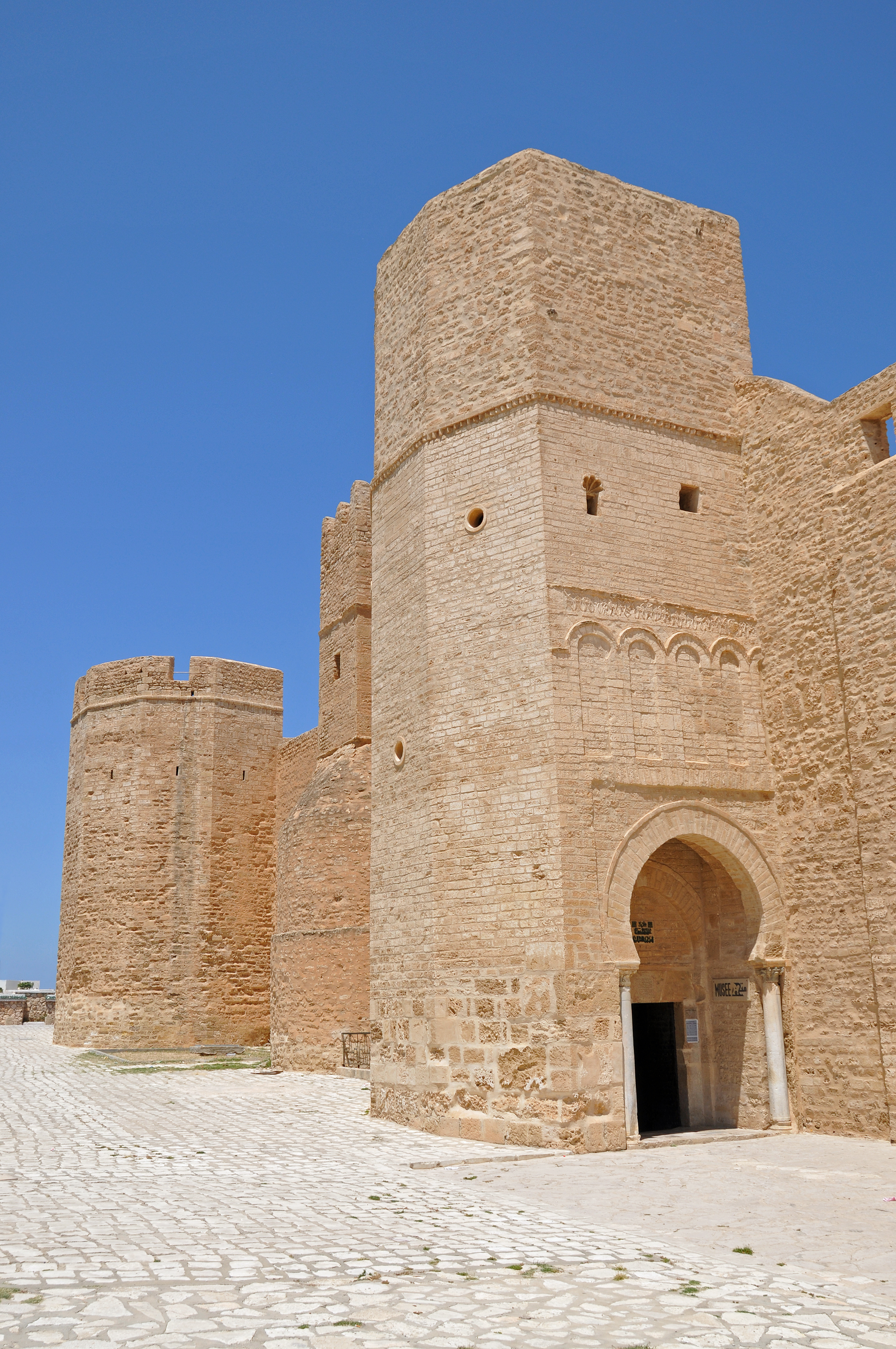
Southwestern gate

Founded in 796 by the Abbasid leader and the governor of Ifriqiya, Harthama ibn A'yan, several improvements and changes were introduced to the building throughout the medieval times, including the expansion carried out by Abu al-Qasim ibn Tammam in 966. Initially it was quadrilateral shaped and then renovated into a composition of four buildings with two inner courtyards. There's also a spiral staircase of about a hundred steps leading to the watchtower where visual messages were exchanged at night with the towers of neighboring ribats. Many watchtowers were added between 11th and 13th, 17th and 19th centuries in order to accommodate the artillery. The towers can be climbed by visitors, allowing views of the city and the beach.

In addition to the small rooms dedicated to the worshiping Mujahideen who were performing prayer and meditation during their military duty, the ribat has two mosques, the larger of which today houses a unique collection of ritual objects and traditional medieval industrial materials.

== In popular culture ==
The Ribat of Monastir in Tunisia was used as a location for the film Monty Python's Life of Brian. According to Michael Palin, the first scene filmed at the Ribat of Monastir was the stoning scene along the outside wall.
