= Sahel Metro =

Sahel Train
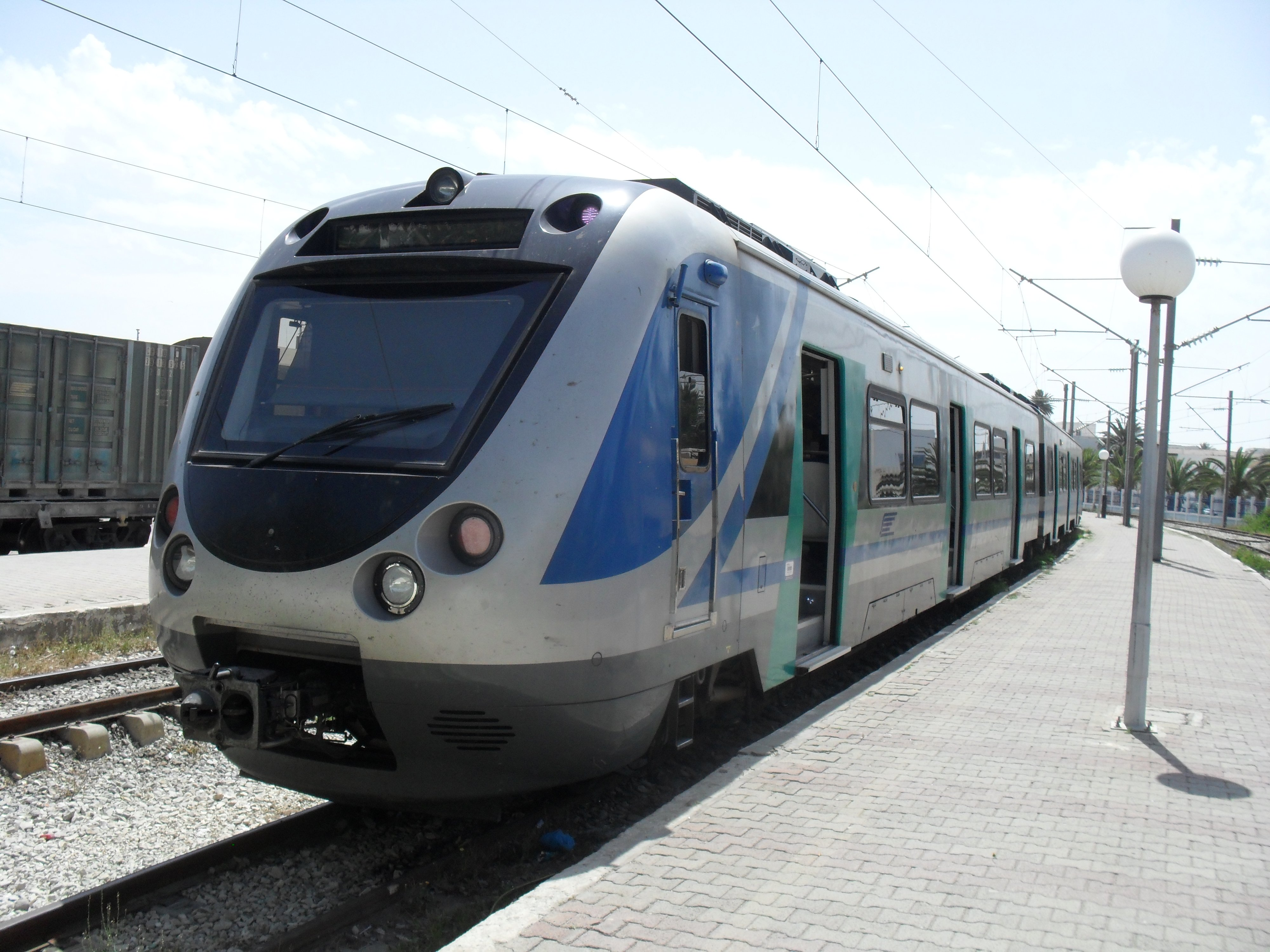

Overview
- Termini: Sousse; Mahdia
- Website: www.sncft.com.tn/fr/banlieue_sahel/presentation.html

Service
- Type: Passenger
- Operator: Société Nationale des Chemins de Fer Tunisiens

Technical
- Line length: 73 km (45 mi)
- Track gauge: 1,000 mm (3 ft 3 3/8 in) metre gauge
- Electrification: 25 kV 50 Hz

The Sahel Train is an electrified, metre gauge railway and suburban rail line with trains serving Sousse and Mahdia, with a spur to Monastir, in Tunisia. The 73 kilometres (45 mi) line has overhead electrification at 25 kV, 50 Hz. Including a triangular junction west of Gare Habib Bourguiba Monastir, the line is mostly double track. However, south of the large multi-platform station at Moknine, the line becomes single track with a limited number of passing loops at stations including Mahdia tourist-Zone and Téboulba.

== Stations ==
The line's stations are, working southwards:

- Sousse - Bab Jadid
- Sousse - Mohamed V
- Sousse South
- Sousse Industrial Zone
- Sahline
- Sahline Sebkha
- Hotels Monastir
- Skanes-Monastir airport station
- La Faculté
- Gare Habib Bourguiba Monastir
- Monastir Industrial Zone
- Khniss - Bembla
- Ksiba Bennane
- Bouhjar
- Lamta
- Sayada
- Ksar Hellal Industrial Zone
- Ksar Hellal
- Moknine Gribaa
- Moknine
- Moknine Industrial Zone (since 2020)
- Téboulba Industrial Zone
- Téboulba
- Bekalta
- Baghdadi
- Mahdia tourist-Zone
- Sidi Messaoud Simes
- Borj Arif
- Mahdia Ezzahra
- Gare Mahdia

== Gallery ==
Gallery of Sahel Suburban Train Stations

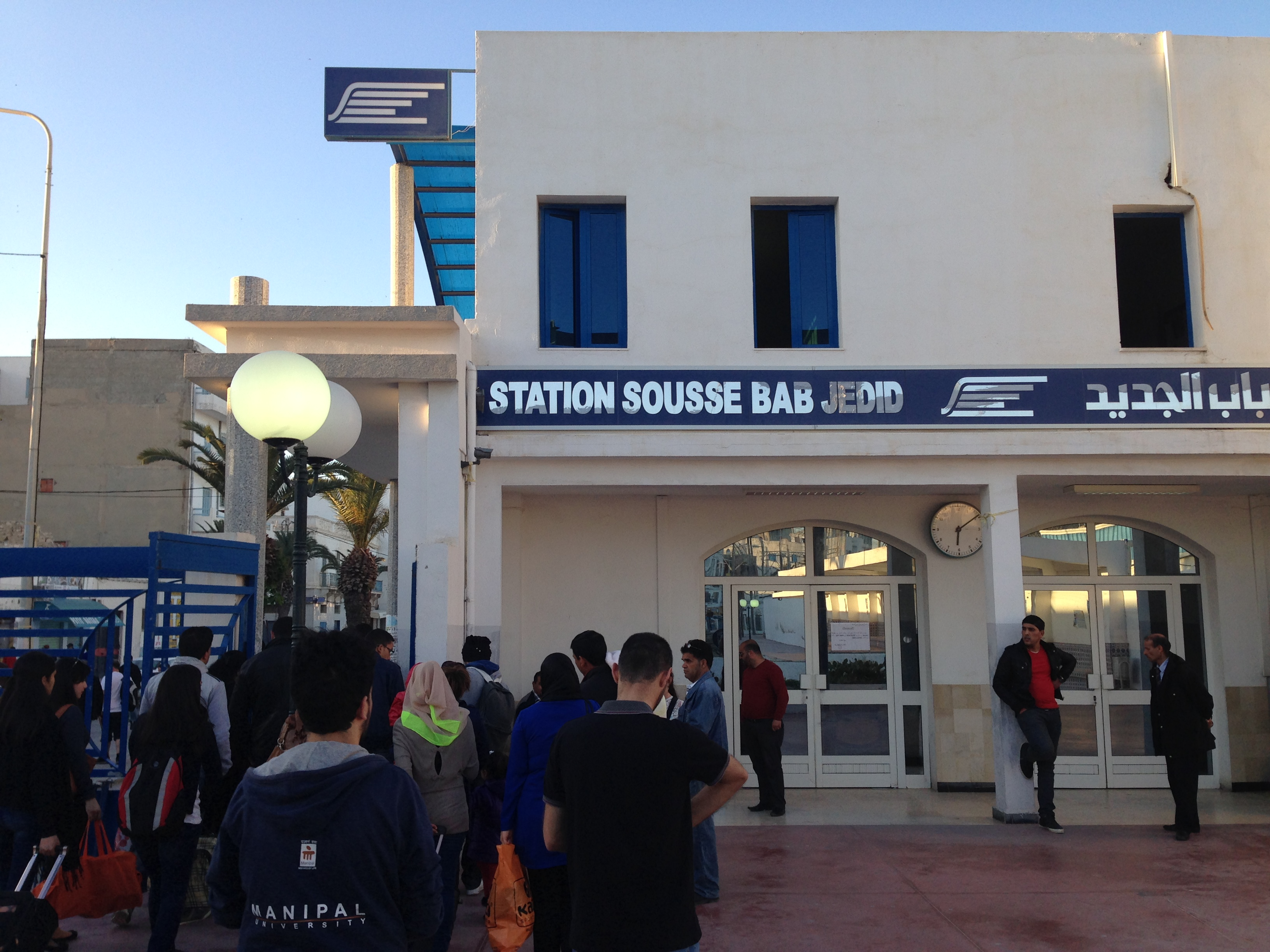
Sousse Bab Jedid.

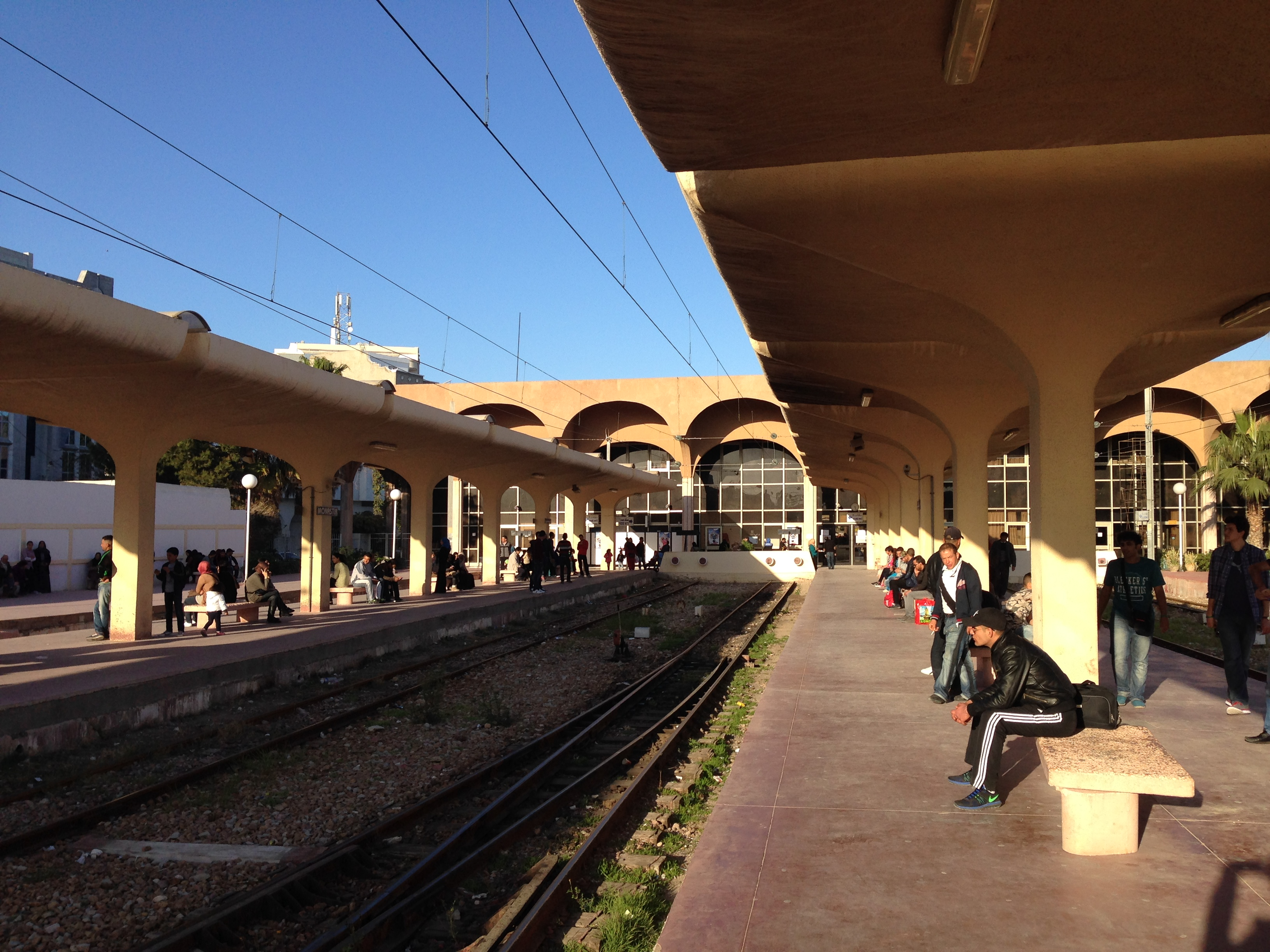
Monastir.

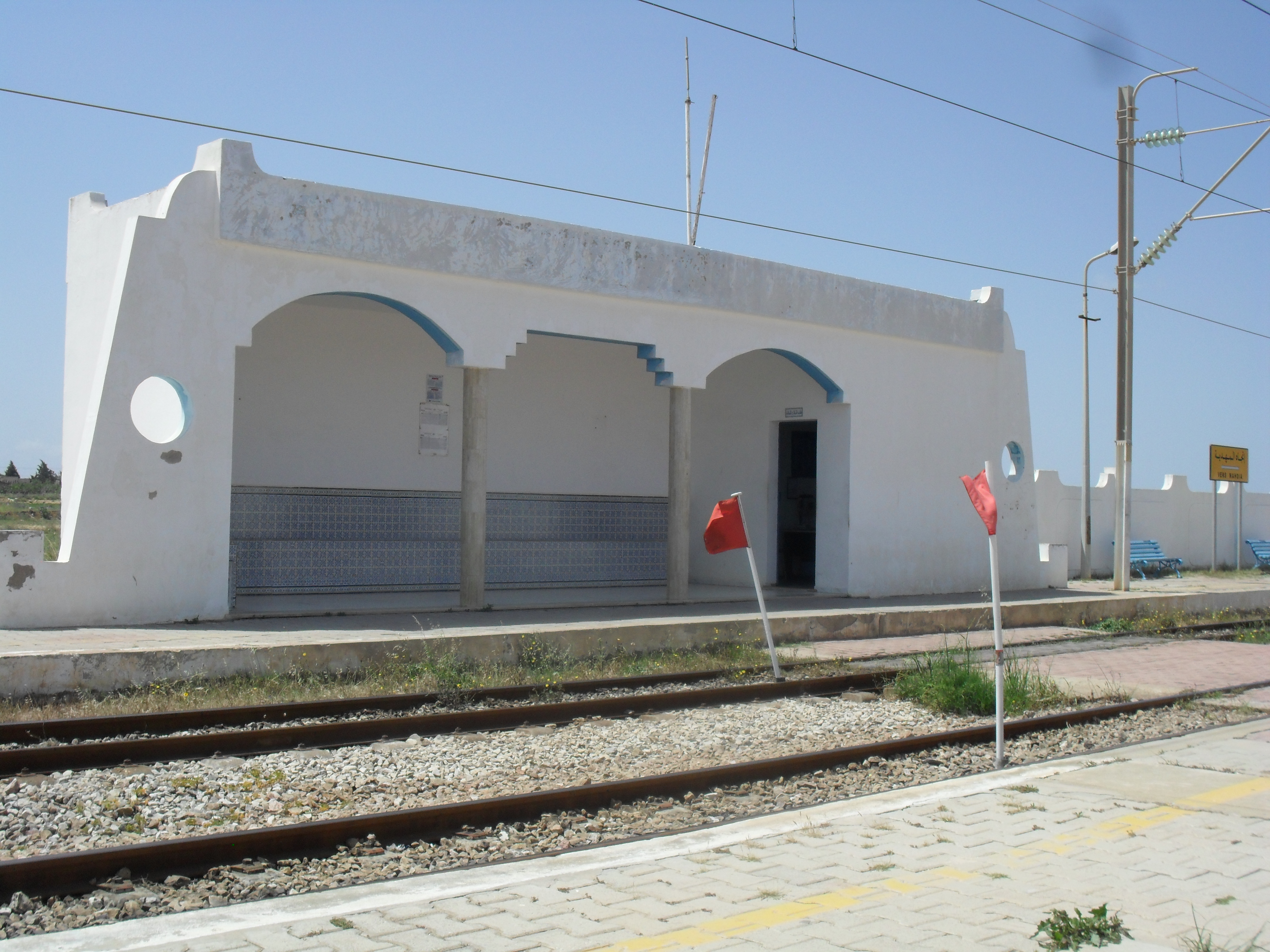
Arret Mahdia Zone Turistique.

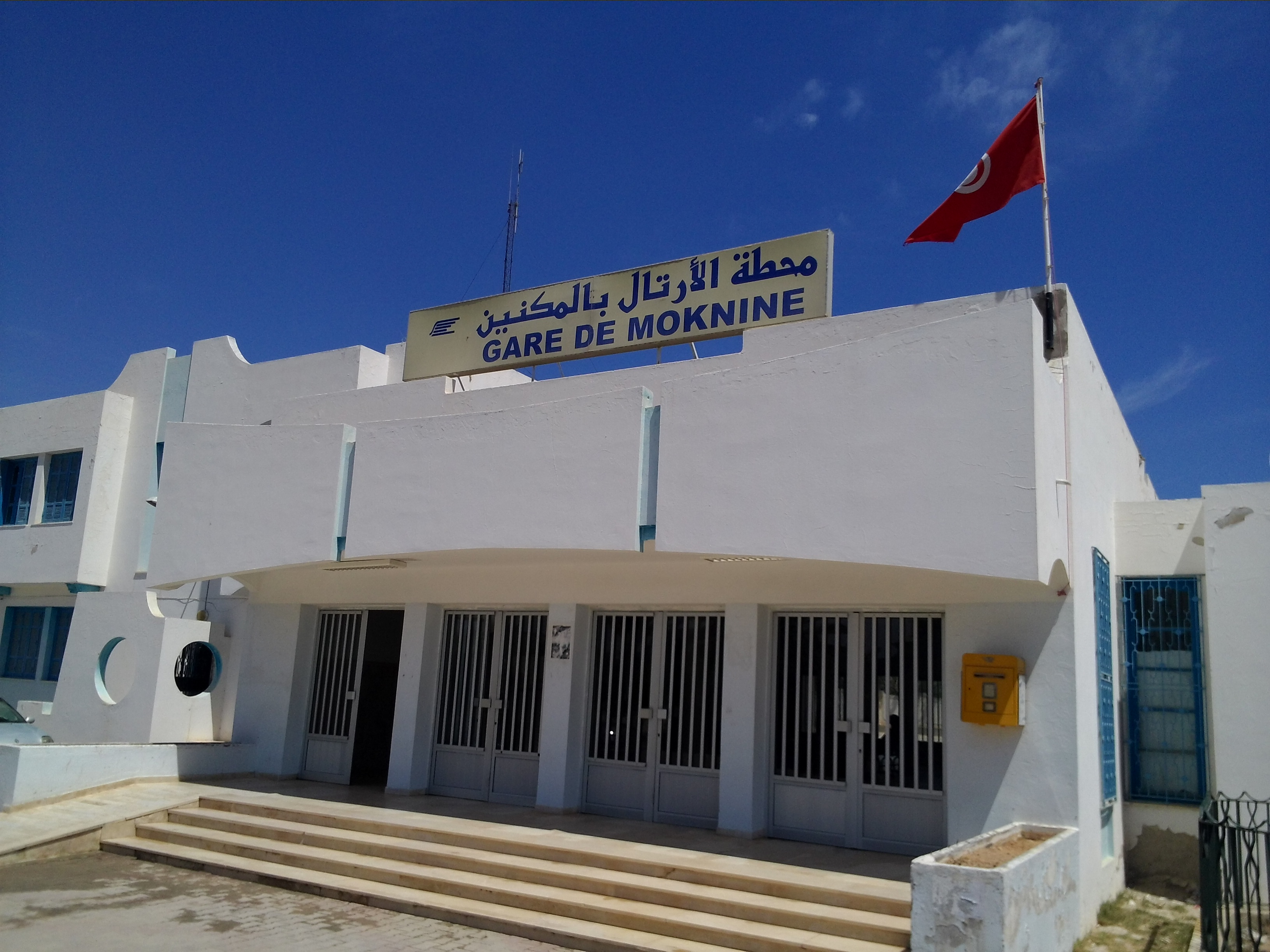
Monkine station.

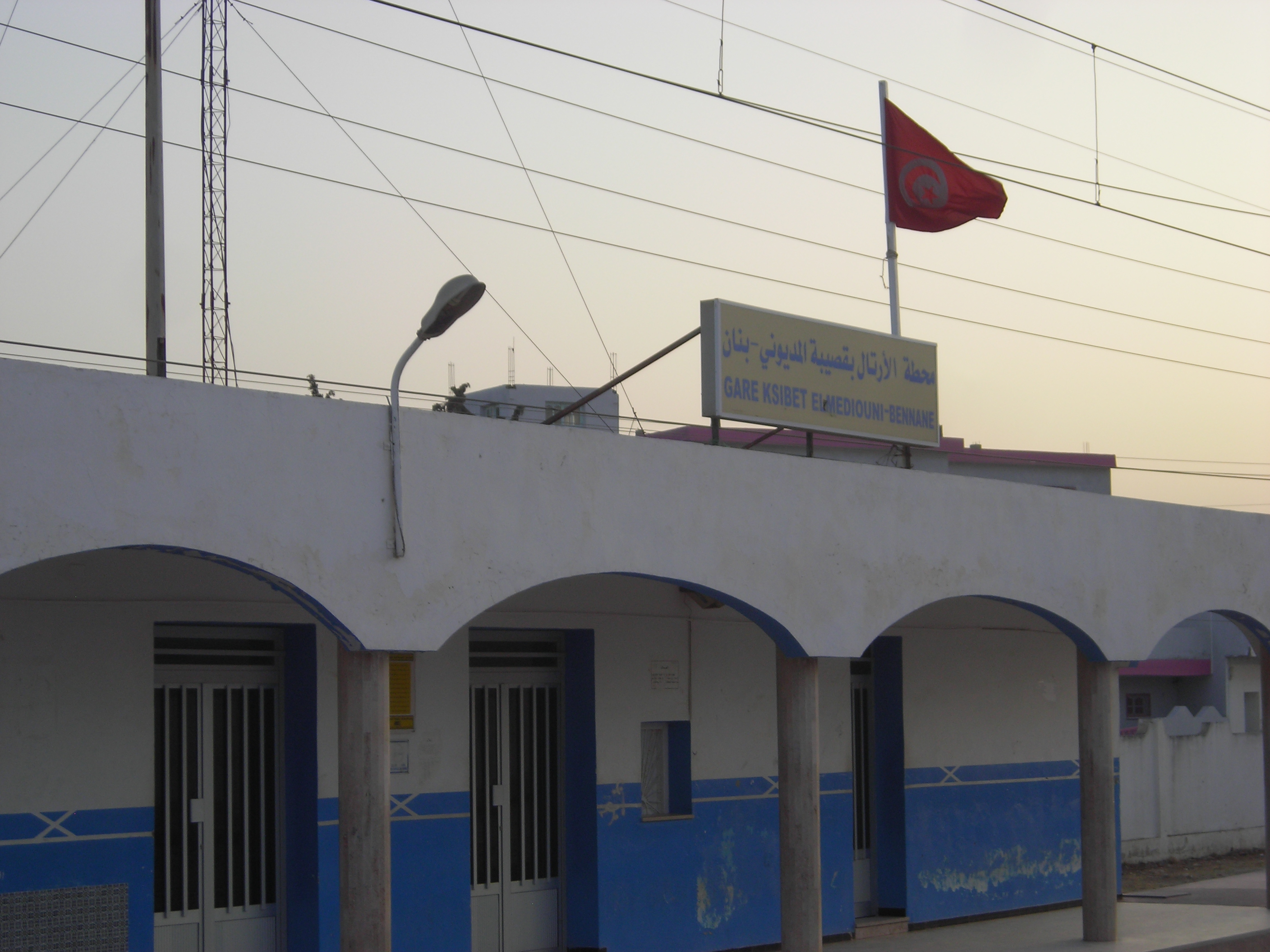
Ksibet El Mediouni.
Gallery of Sahel Suburban Train

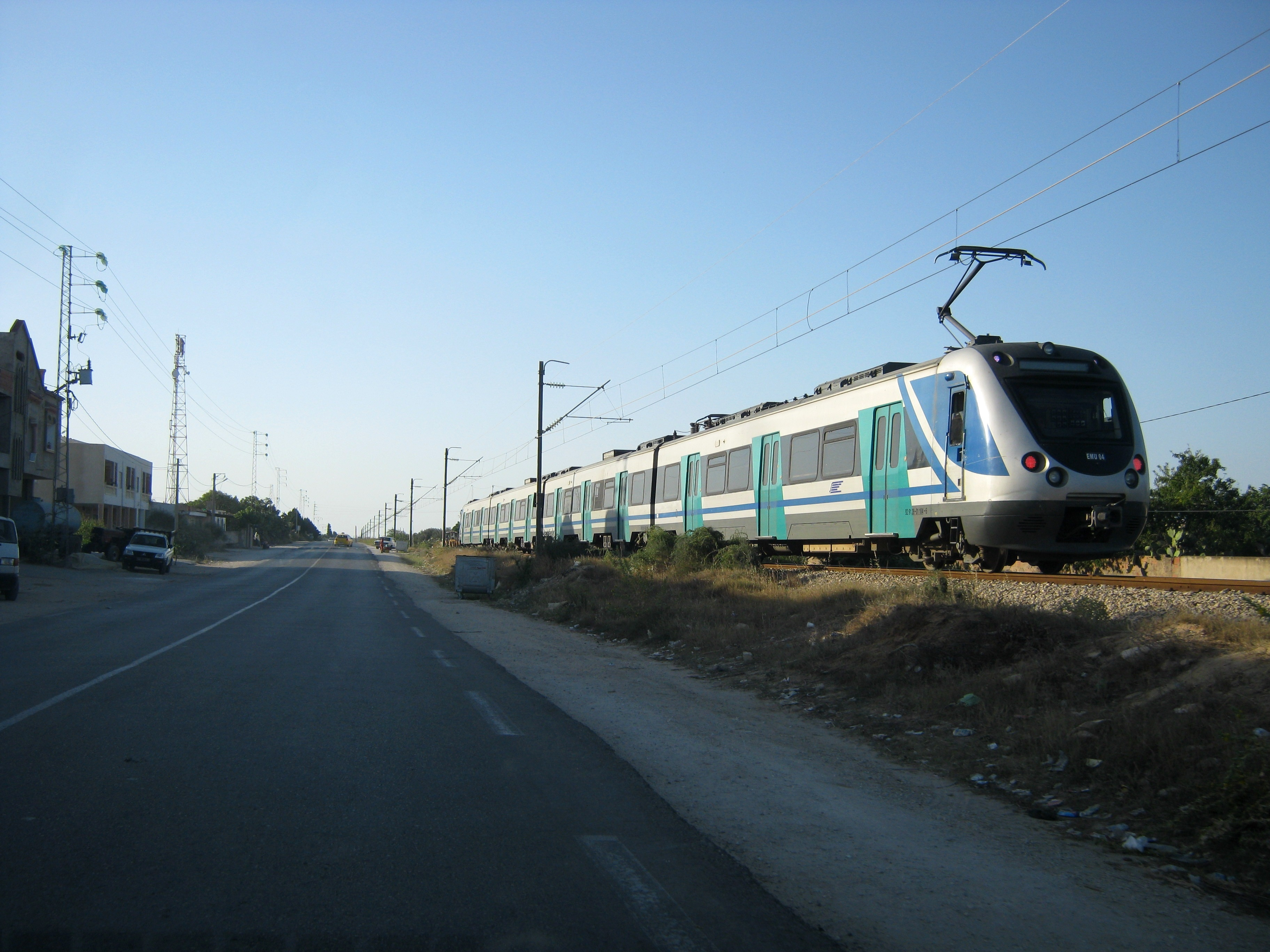
A train runs near the city of Mahdia.

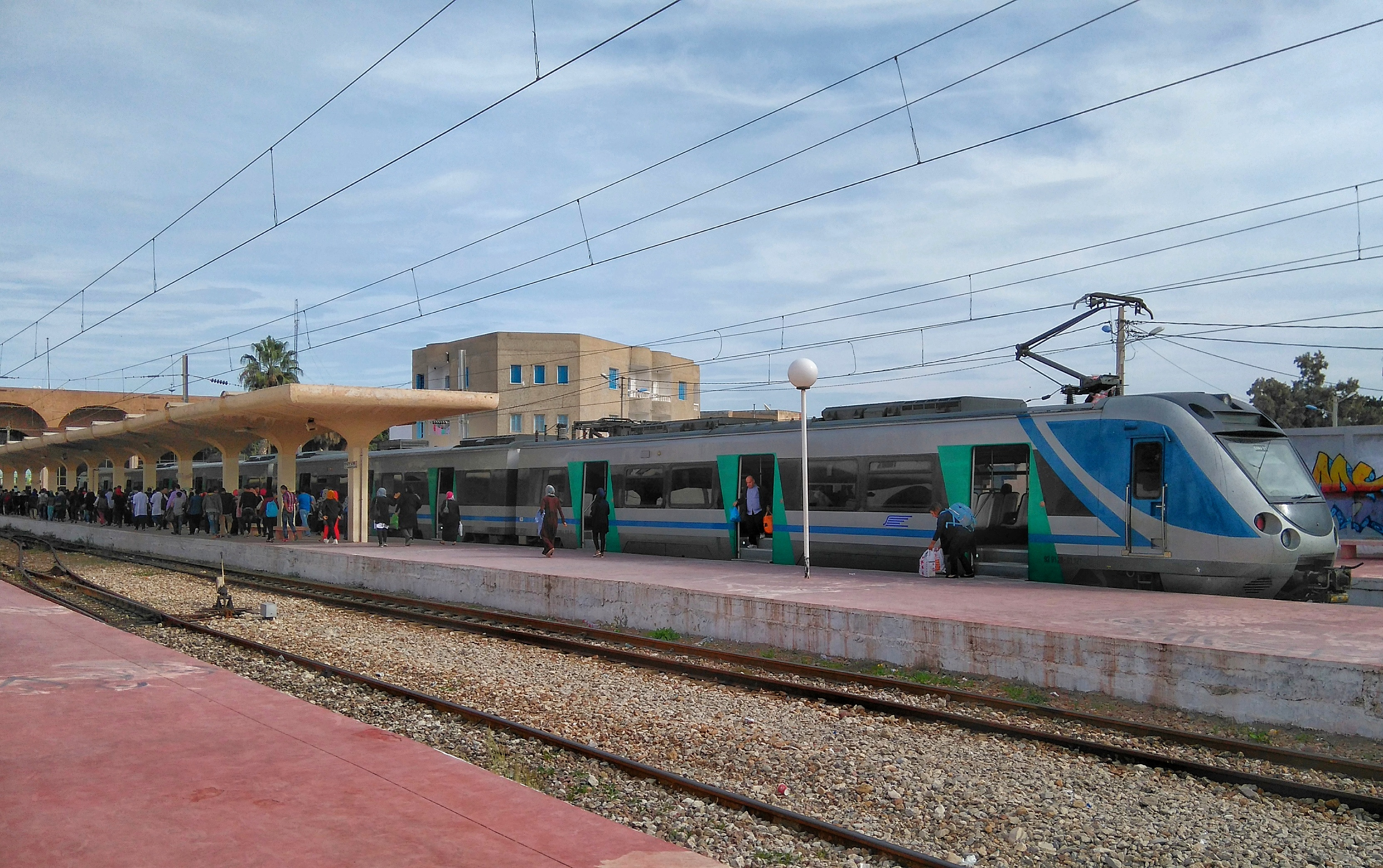
Train in Monastir station

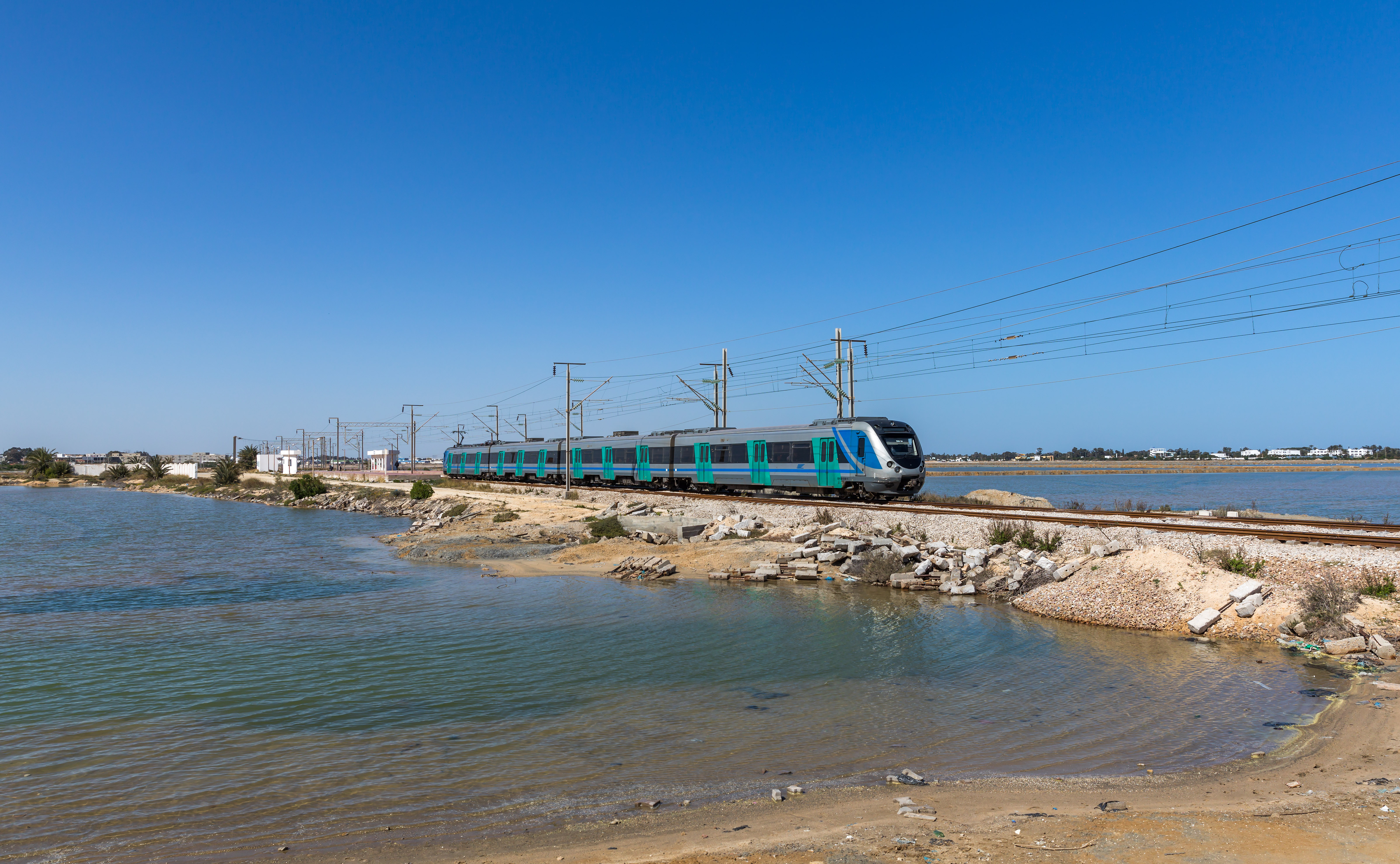
Train in Sahline
