= Hotels Monastir =

Railway station in Monastir, Tunisia

General information
- Location: Monastir; Tunisia
- Coordinates: 35.760046°N 10.744897°E
- Operator: Société Nationale des Chemins de Fer Tunisiens
- Platforms: 2

Construction
- Platform levels: 1
Location

Hotels Monastir is a railway station on the outskirts of Monastir, Tunisia. It is operated by the Société Nationale des Chemins de Fer Tunisiens.

Trains from the station run on the electrified, metre-gauge Sahel Metro line and serve Sousse to the north.

The station lies between the Sahline Sebkha to the west and Skanes-Monastir airport station to the east.
