= Monastir, Tunisia =

City in Tunisia

Monastir المنستير
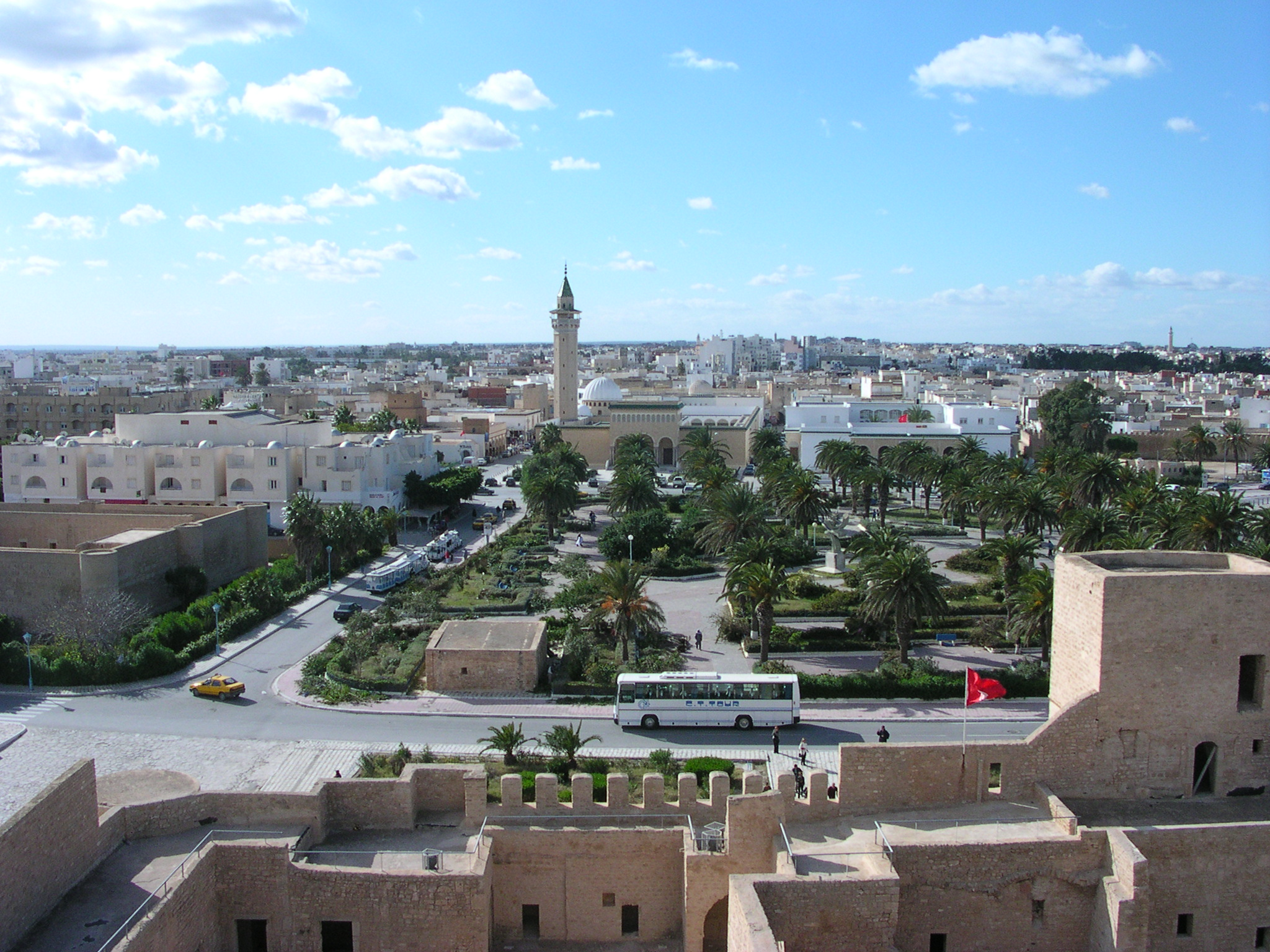
- Monastir from the ribat's tower

- Seal

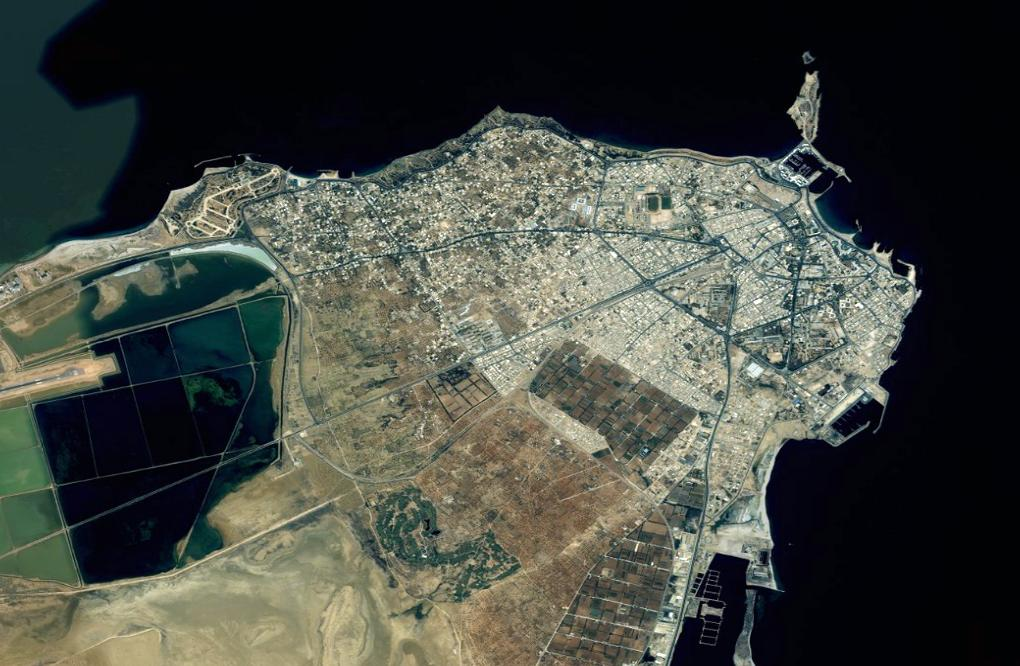
- Monastir from space

- Location in Tunisia
- Coordinates: 35°46′10″N 10°49′10″E
- Country: Tunisia
- Governorate: Monastir Governorate
- Delegation(s): Monastir

Government
  - Mayor: Mondher Marzouk (Independent)

Area
  - Total: 17.9 sq mi (46.3 km^{2})

Population (2022)
  - Total: 107,127
  - Density: 5,990/sq mi (2,310/km^{2})
- Time zone: UTC+1:00 (CET)
- ZIP code: 5000
- Area code: 73

Monastir (Arabic: المنستير, romanized: al-Munastīr, pronounced [ælmunæsˈtiːr]; from the Greek μοναστήριον monastḗrion, 'hermit's cell, monastery'), also called Mestir (Tunisian Arabic: المستير, romanized: il-Məstīr;), is a city on the central coast of Tunisia, in the Sahel area, some 20 kilometres (12 miles) south of Sousse and 162 kilometres (101 miles) south of Tunis. Traditionally a fishing port, Monastir is now a major tourist resort. Its population is about 93,306. It is the capital of Monastir Governorate.

== Geography ==
=== Location ===
Monastir is a peninsula surrounded by the Mediterranean Sea on three sides and forming, to the south, the Gulf of Monastir of the same name, which extends to Cap of Ras Dimass. It offers diverse landscapes, in particular its sandy and rocky beaches as well as a cliff stretching over nearly six kilometers.

== History ==
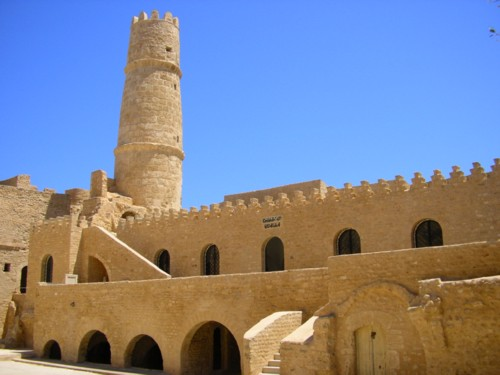
The Ribat in Monastir

Monastir derived its name from the numerous temples that once stretched from the city’s shores to its inland areas. Archaeological discoveries have revealed rock-cut tombs within caves dating back to the Phoenician era, along with an extensive network of tunnels that linked several cities of religious significance. These tunnels later served both the Romans and the early Muslims. Many of the tombs and caves were located on the islands of Al-Ma'idah, Al-Wastaniyah, and Al-Ghadamsi. In those times, the area was sparsely populated, inhabited mainly by monks and priests.

Monastir was founded on the ruins of the Punic–Roman city of Ruspina. The city features a well-preserved Ribat of Monastir that was used to scan the sea for hostile ships and as a defence against the attacks of the Byzantine fleet. Several ulema came to stay in the ribat of this peaceful city for contemplation. The ribat was, in the 1970s, also one of the filming locations for both the miniseries Jesus of Nazareth and Monty Python's Life of Brian. There are panoramic views of the city taken from a French naval intelligence airship in 1924.

== Public Transport ==
The city is on the electrified, metre-gauge Sahel Metro line with trains serving Sousse and Mahdia which the city is served by 5 stations of the metro : Hôtels Monastir, Aéroport Skanès-Monastir, Faculté Monastir, Monastir, Monastir-Zone indistruelle. Monastir Habib Bourguiba International Airport has flights from many Western European countries. It is run by Tepe Akfen Ventures Airport Holding (TAV).

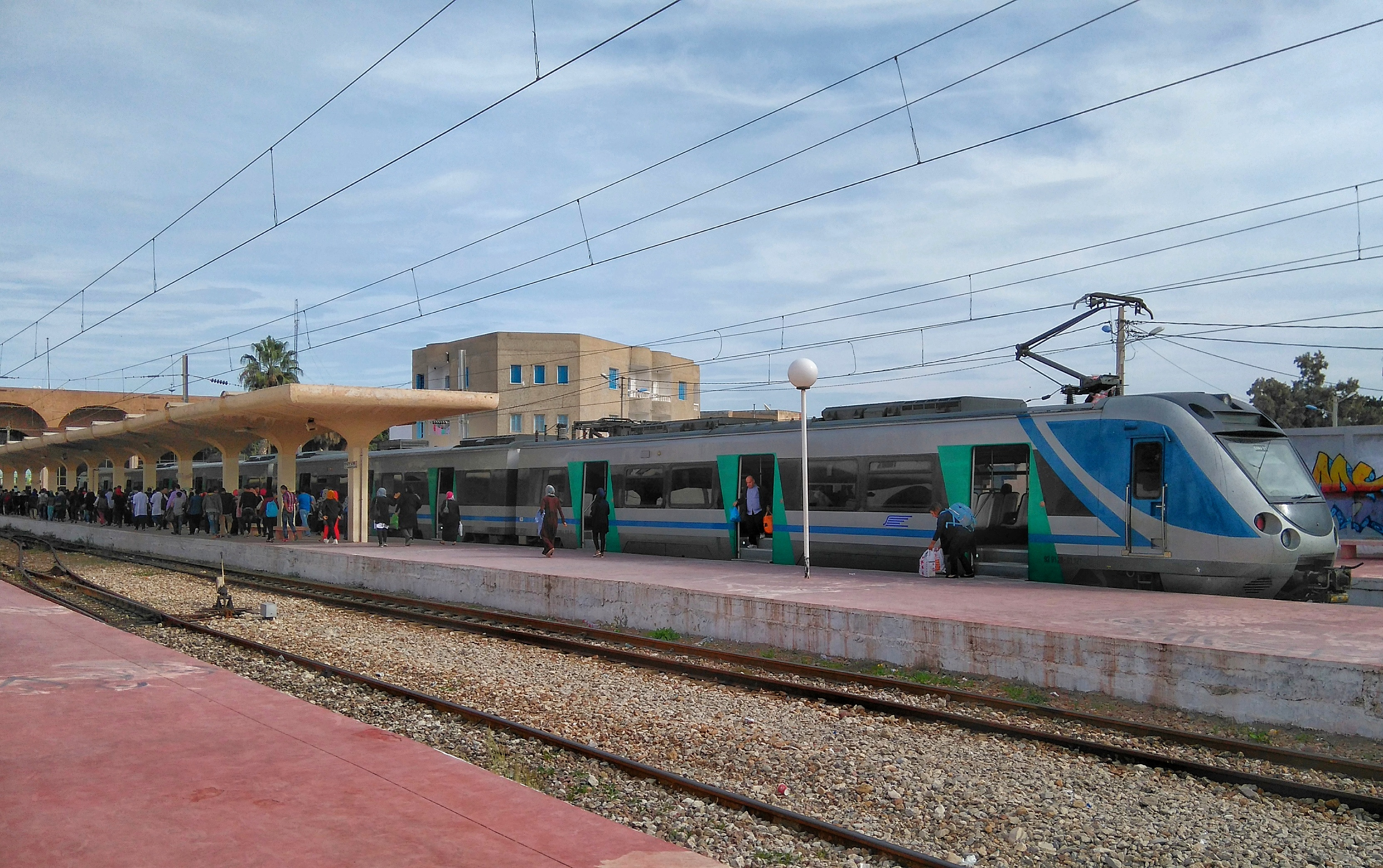
Metro in the station of Monastir.

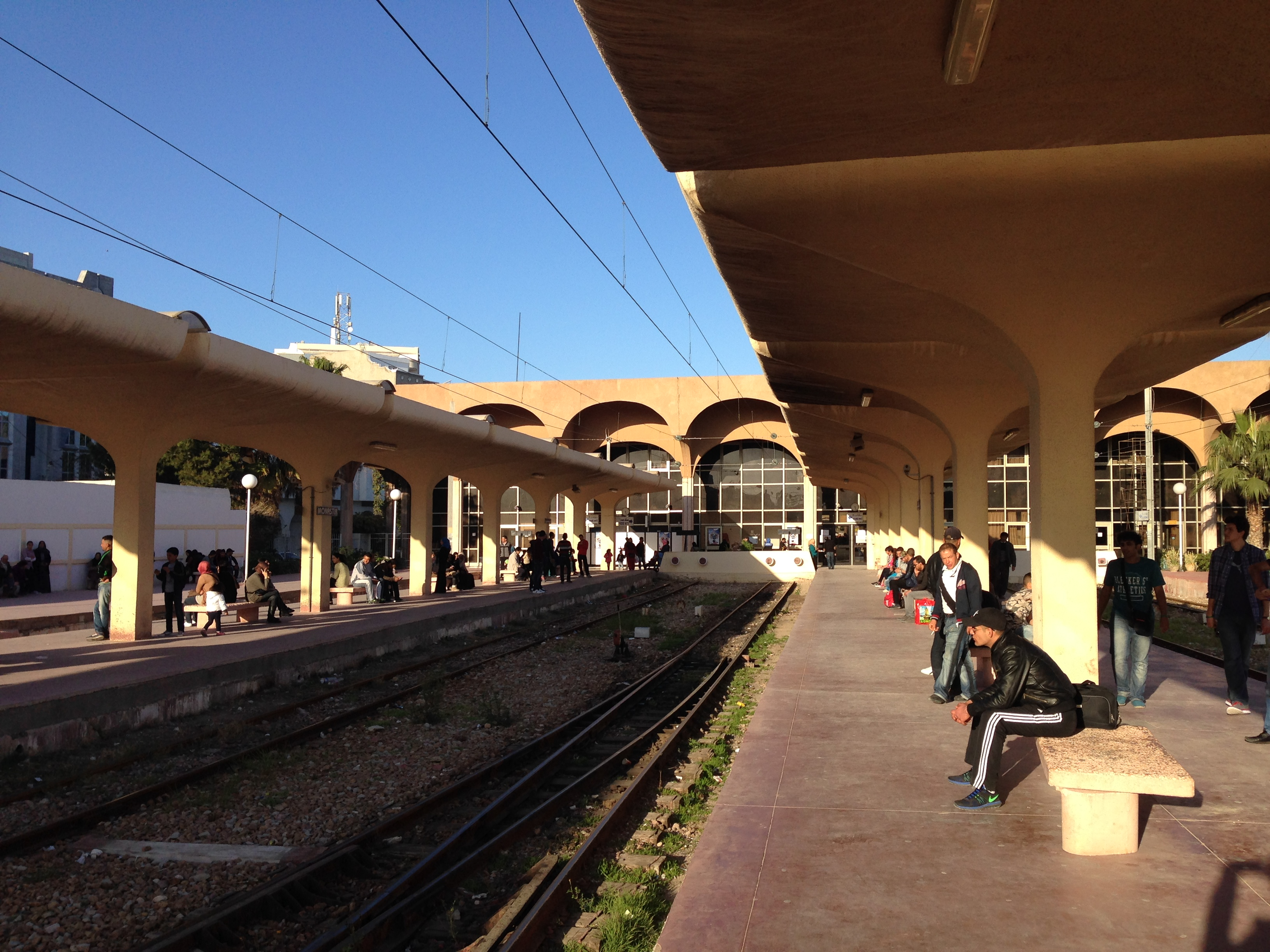
Station of Monastir.

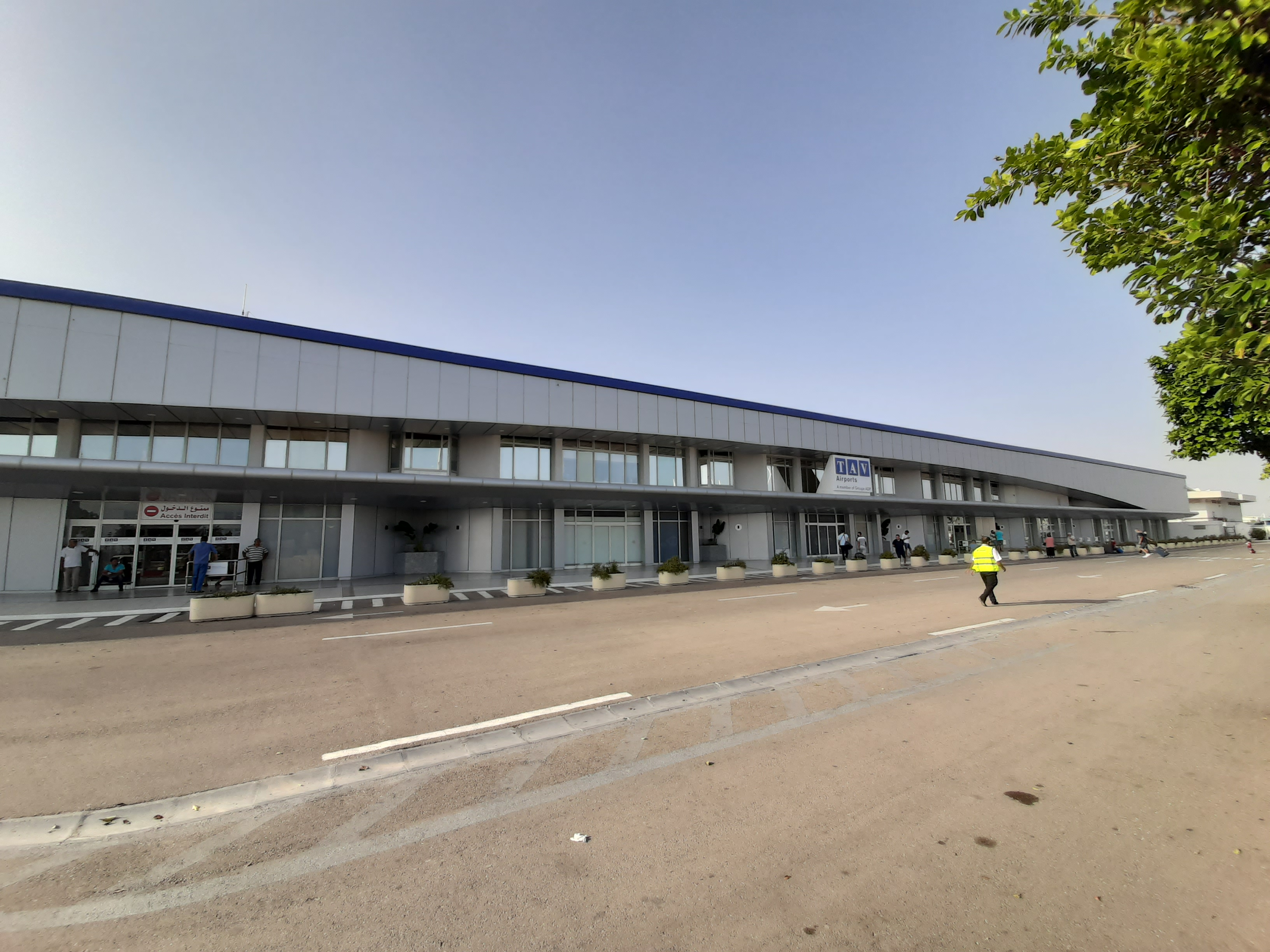
Monastir International Airport.

== Climate ==
Monastir has a hot semi-arid climate (Köppen BSh), characterized by hot summers, mild winters, abundant sunshine, and low rainfall year-round. Located on Tunisia’s central Mediterranean coast, it experiences more moderate conditions than inland areas bordering the Sahara. Average high temperatures reach about 33 °C (91 °F) in July and August. Relative humidity decreases slightly during peak summer, averaging around 55% in June, 53% in July, and 57% in August, before rising to about 64% in September.

Climate data for Monastir (1991–2020, extremes 1968–2017)
Month	Jan	Feb	Mar	Apr	May	Jun	Jul	Aug	Sep	Oct	Nov	Dec	Year
Record high °C (°F)	27.2 (81.0)	31.1 (88.0)	37.1 (98.8)	37.5 (99.5)	43.6 (110.5)	47.0 (116.6)	48.3 (118.9)	47.0 (116.6)	43.0 (109.4)	39.5 (103.1)	31.7 (89.1)	29.7 (85.5)	48.3 (118.9)
Mean daily maximum °C (°F)	16.9 (62.4)	17.2 (63.0)	19.5 (67.1)	21.8 (71.2)	25.5 (77.9)	29.5 (85.1)	32.5 (90.5)	33.1 (91.6)	29.8 (85.6)	26.5 (79.7)	21.9 (71.4)	18.1 (64.6)	24.4 (75.9)
Daily mean °C (°F)	12.8 (55.0)	13.1 (55.6)	15.3 (59.5)	17.7 (63.9)	21.2 (70.2)	25.0 (77.0)	27.9 (82.2)	28.6 (83.5)	25.9 (78.6)	22.6 (72.7)	17.8 (64.0)	14.0 (57.2)	20.2 (68.4)
Mean daily minimum °C (°F)	8.7 (47.7)	9.0 (48.2)	11.2 (52.2)	13.6 (56.5)	16.9 (62.4)	20.5 (68.9)	23.2 (73.8)	24.1 (75.4)	22.1 (71.8)	18.8 (65.8)	13.6 (56.5)	9.9 (49.8)	16.0 (60.8)
Record low °C (°F)	0.2 (32.4)	0.1 (32.2)	1.9 (35.4)	4.5 (40.1)	8.2 (46.8)	12.4 (54.3)	15.1 (59.2)	14.3 (57.7)	13.9 (57.0)	7.3 (45.1)	0.2 (32.4)	−1.9 (28.6)	−1.9 (28.6)
Average precipitation mm (inches)	36.7 (1.44)	29.5 (1.16)	33.7 (1.33)	21.9 (0.86)	19.7 (0.78)	5.9 (0.23)	2.7 (0.11)	15.4 (0.61)	65.4 (2.57)	54.9 (2.16)	38.4 (1.51)	40.8 (1.61)	364.9 (14.37)
Average precipitation days (≥ 1.0 mm)	4.7	4.3	4.1	4.3	2.9	1.3	0.4	1.4	5.0	4.4	4.5	4.6	41.6
Average relative humidity (%)	70	69	70	69	69	67	65	66	70	71	70	71	69
Mean monthly sunshine hours	178.9	188.2	221.4	240.7	291.8	315.4	350.7	323.7	243.5	221.6	195.0	171.8	2,942.7
Source 1: Institut National de la Météorologie (humidity 1961-1990, sun 1981–2010) (Note: The Station ID for Monastir is 340404111.)
Source 2: NOAA

== Economy ==
The industrial sector, tourism and agriculture constitute the main activities of the population : The economy of this region is also based on agriculture. The 86% of land used for agriculture, of which 13,125 ha are public or private irrigated areas. 450 ha are forests against 4,600 ha for rangelands. The livestock production is around 74,500 head (cattle, goats, sheep). Regarding the main agricultural products, the region produces in particular fishery products (23,983 t / year), red meat, poultry, milk, oil and olive. Olive cultivation covers an area of 60,000 ha. Monastir is also making a reputation for the production of vegetable crops (169,702 t / year) and arboriculture (11,297 t). The development of agriculture is favored by the presence of 8 hill lakes and hill dams. The establishment of a dozen aquaculture sites in the lagoon of Monastir also allows the region to engage in the breeding of sea bream and sea bass.

The tourist sector occupies the third occupation of the population with luxury hotels by the sea, golf courses ... the region attracts many foreign tourists. The tourism sector has more than fifty hotel units with a total accommodation capacity of more than 25,440 beds. These hotels provide 9,000 jobs. In addition to the 8th century ribat, the great mosque, the Bourguiba mosque, the museums, the souk, the Kiriates islands, the city also has other assets such as the marina, diving centers, two golf courses, a racecourse, night clubs etc. Entertainment abounds between fun and sporting activities. For its last 5 decades, it has attracted tourists by the seaside potential of Saknes. It has two hotel units, a museum, a marine district and the marina. There is also the tourist area of Jinène El Oust which has 6 residential units and the Bekalta area which has 6 hotel units and entertainment lots. In addition, the region's transport infrastructure is also one of the determining factors in the growth of this governorate. Indeed, it has an international airport, a train station, and a metro that connects it to Sousse and Mahdia. Buses, taxis, rental vehicles also connect it to these two other governorates.

Nouvelair has its head office in Monastir in the Dkhila Tourist Zone, near the Hôtel Sahara Beach.

Pictures of some hotels in Monastir

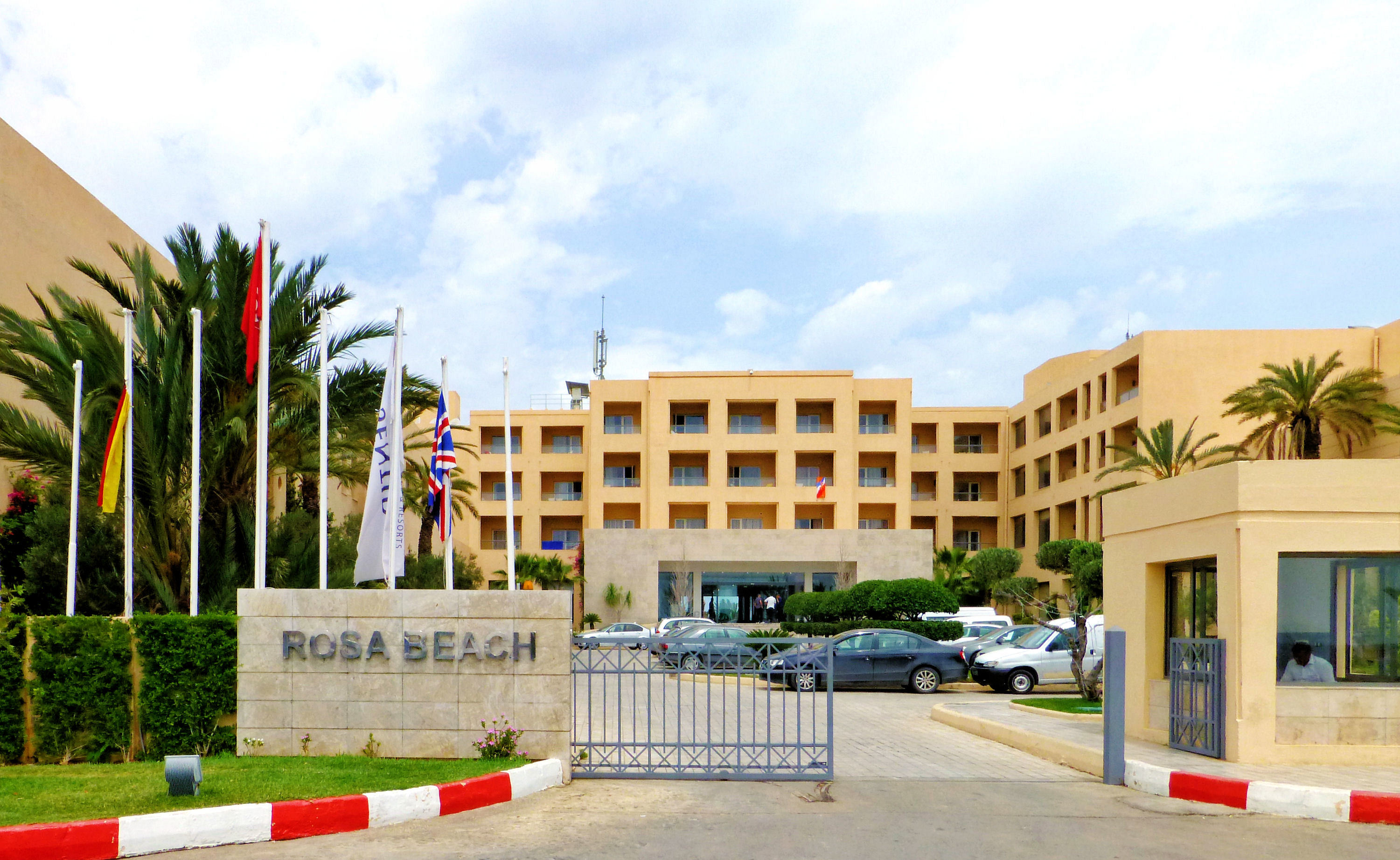

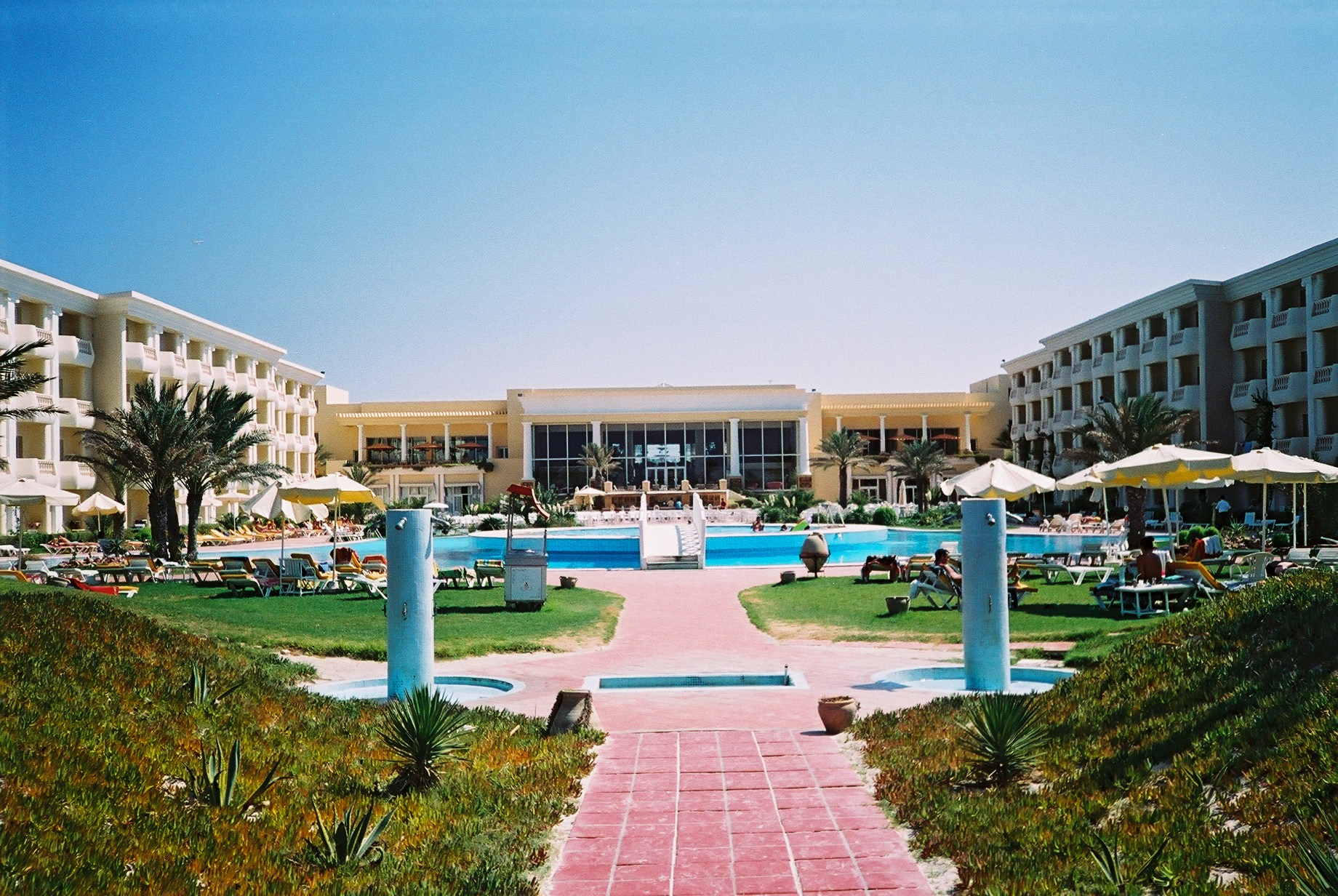

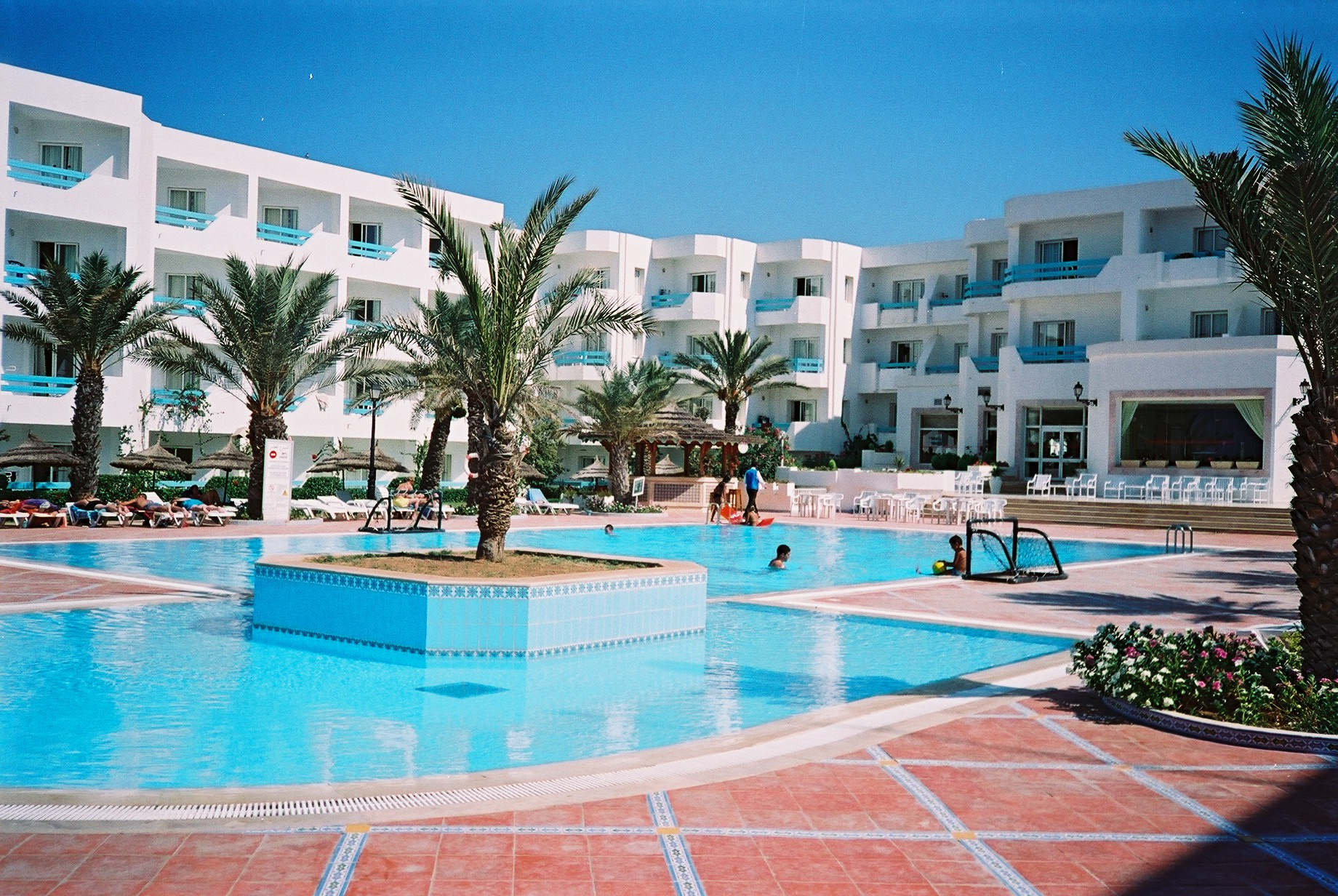

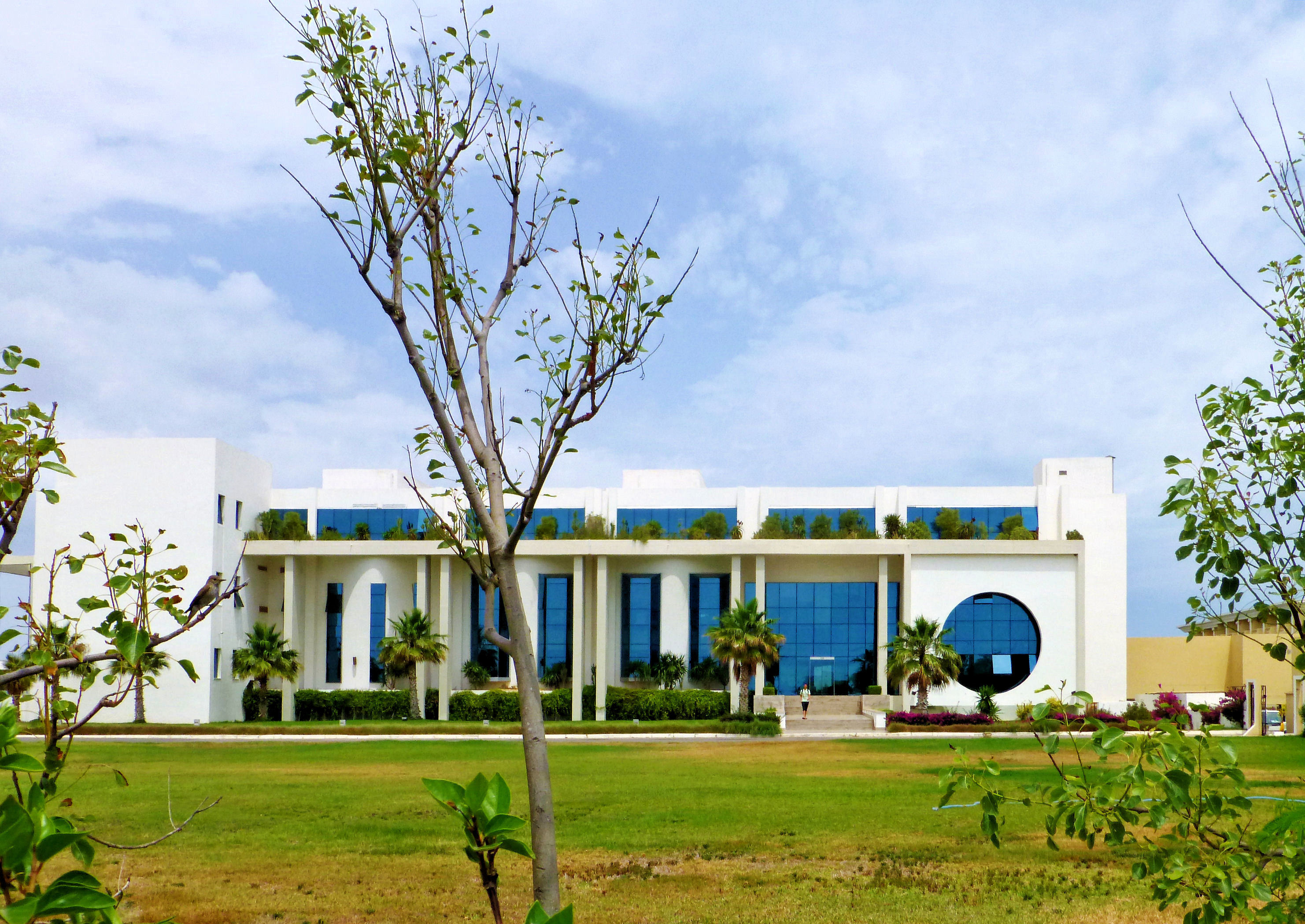

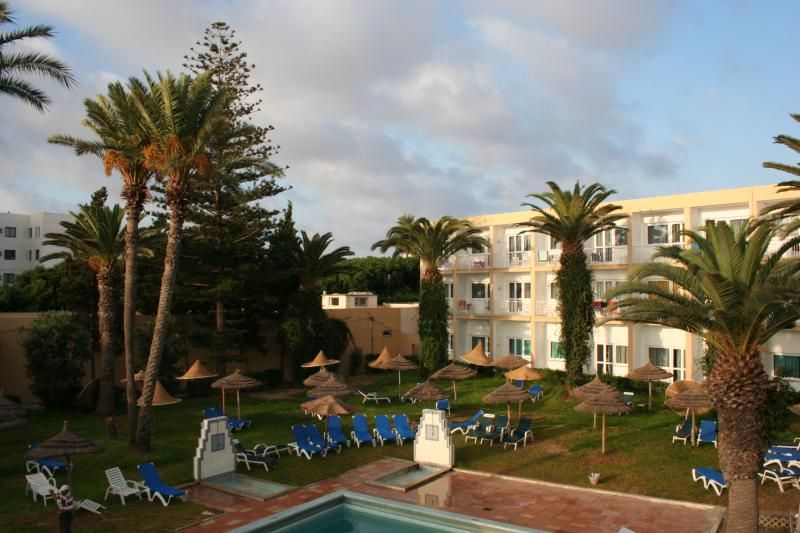

== Culture ==
=== Cultural heritage ===
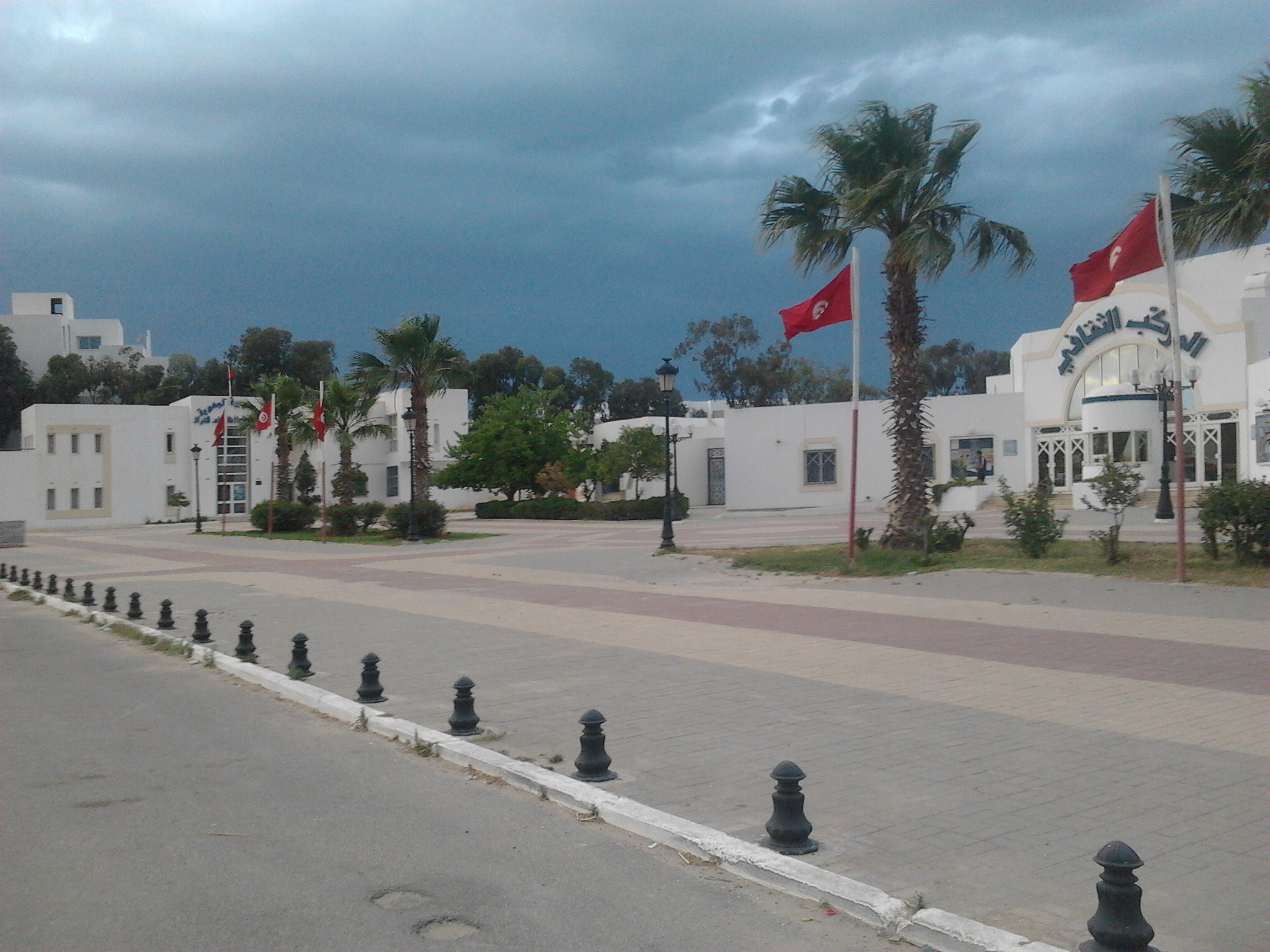
Cultural complex of Monastir

Monastir has a museum of Islamic arts, inaugurated on August 5, 1958, and which is housed on the first floor of the south wing of the ribat; it contains nearly 300 works (fragments of wood, funerary stelae, polished ceramics, etc.) and receives the visit of almost 100,000 visitors every year.

=== Music ===
The ethnomusicologist and clarinetist Hassine Haj Youssef is one of Monastir's most active personalities in the musical field. A disciple of Salah El Mahdi, he is also the father of the violinist and composer Jasser Haj Youssef. He is a professor at the National Conservatory of Monastir and at the Higher Institute of Music of Sousse. He has adapted the method of Zoltán Kodály to the teaching of Arabic music, he is also the producer of several programs of traditional music and anthropology on Radio Monastir and on national television.

Since 2005, he has devoted his time to composition and research on Sufi music in Tunisia.

=== Education ===
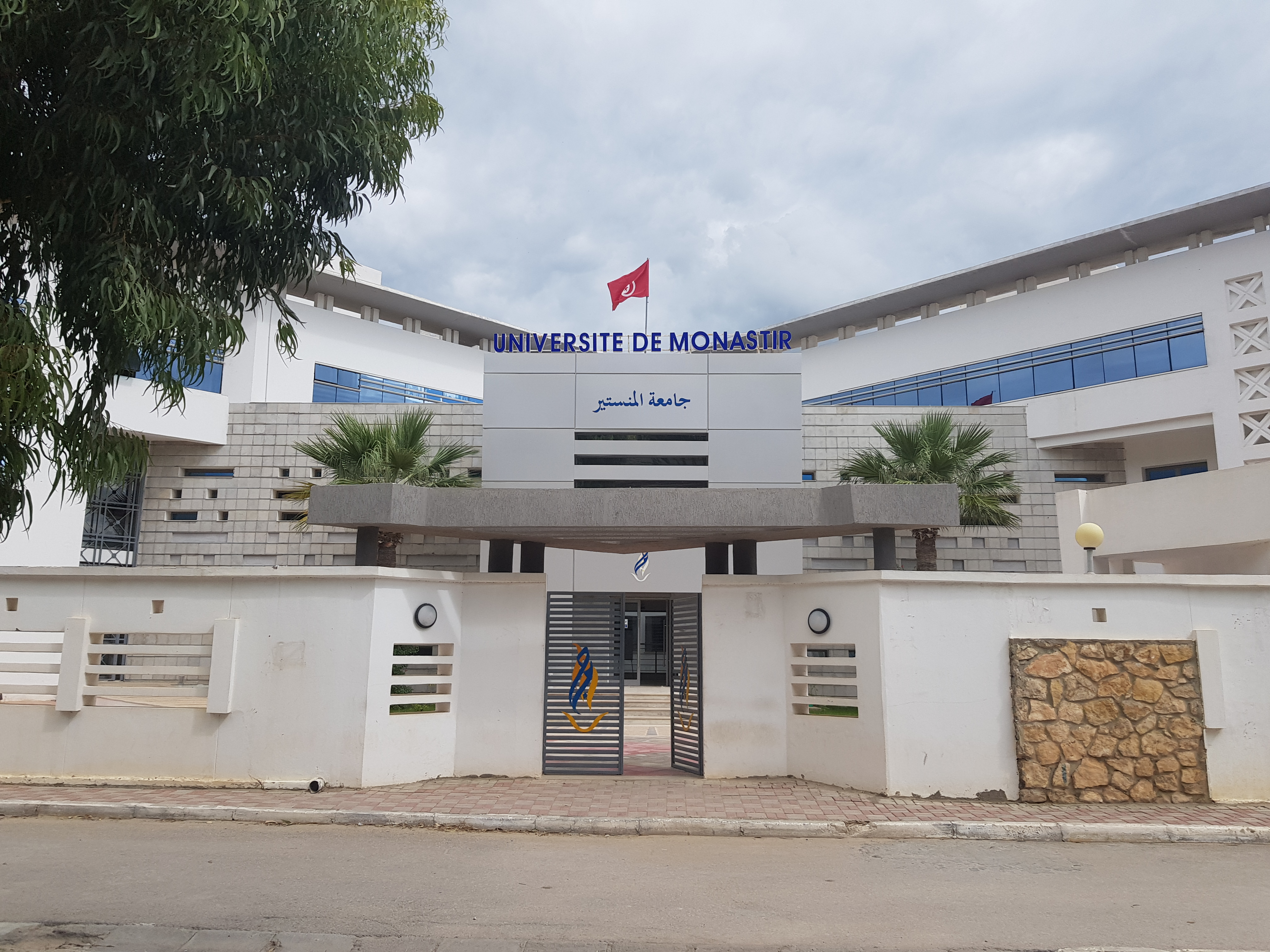
View of the University of Monastir

The city of Monastir has:

- Five Junior High Schools of basic education: Ali-Bourguiba, Moufida-Bourguiba, Imtiez, Salem-Bchir and a pioneer junior high school;
- Four High Schools: Fatouma-Bourguiba, Hedi-Khefacha, Bourguiba and a Pioneer high school (open since the school year 2003–2004).

Monastir is also a university city, incorporating the University of Monastir which was founded on September 2, 2004 and covers the governorates of Monastir and Mahdia. The university of Monastir includes sixteen faculty departments, of which ten are located in Monastir:

- Faculty of science
- Faculty of medicine
- Faculty of dental medicine
- Faculty of pharmacy
- The National Engineering School of Monastir
- The Higher School of science and technologies of health
- The Higher Institutes of Biotechnology
- The Higher Institutes Computer Science and Mathematics
- The Higher Institutes Fashion Trades
- The Preparatory Institute for Engineering Studies

The student population of Monastir exceeded 27,000 in 2007–2008, making the city one of the largest in terms of university studies along with Tunis, Sfax and Sousse.

=== Sport ===
Monastir is represented by the US Monastir in football and the basketball. In 2022, the US Monastir won the BAL after being the finalist in 2021 BAL season.

The monastirian team plays its matches in the Mustapha Ben Jannet stadium for the football, and the Mohamed-Mzali indoor for the basketball.

The city hosts multiple M15 and M25 tournaments on the ITF World Tennis Tour.

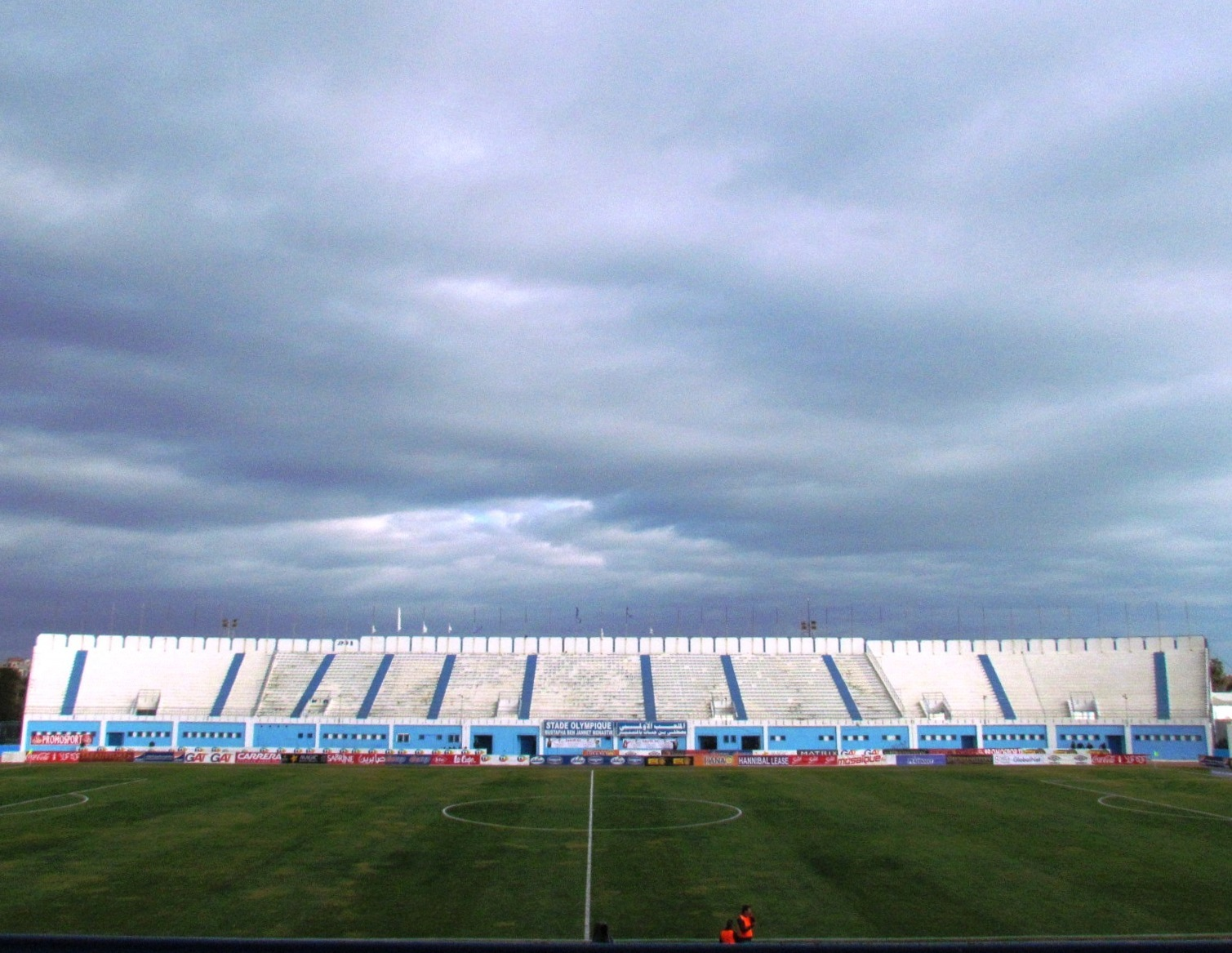
Mustapha Ben Jannet stadium.

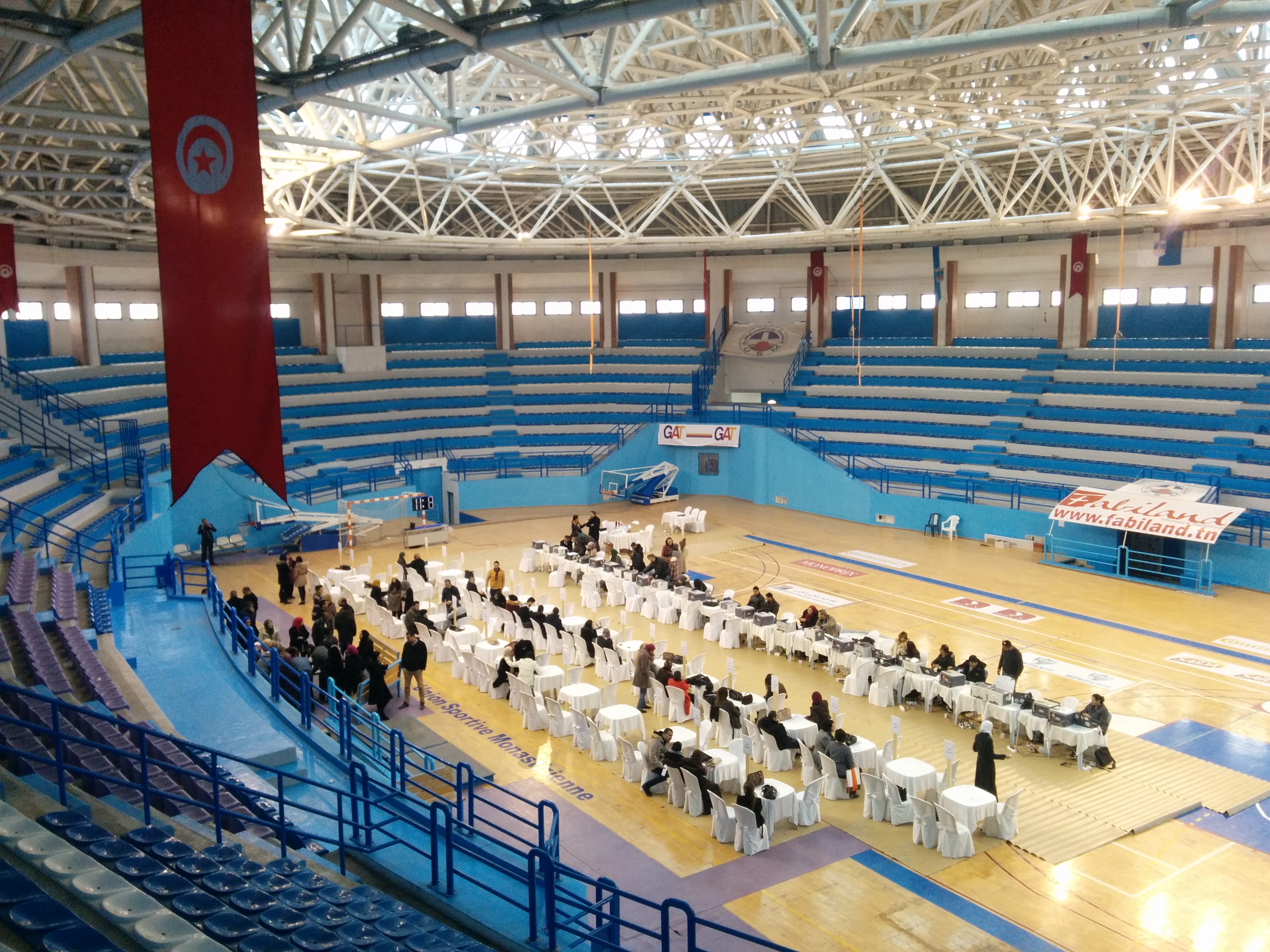
Mohamed Mzali indoor.

== Notable people ==
The first Tunisian president Habib Bourguiba was born in Monastir, and his mausoleum is located in the city. Many other famous politicians are also from Monastir:

- Mohamed Mzali, prime minister of Tunisia from 1980 to 1986
- Hedi Amara Nouira, prime minister of Tunisia from 1970 to 1980

Among other notable people:

- Amel Majri, footballer for Lyon and the France national team
- Jawhar Mnari, footballer, born in Monastir and winner of DFB-Pokal (2006/2007).
- Hamza Younés, footballer

== Twin towns – sister cities ==
Monastir is twinned with:

- Dushanbe, Tajikistan
- Manisa, Turkey
- Münster, Germany
- Saint-Étienne, France
- Tétouan, Morocco
- Tizi Ouzou, Algeria

== Gallery ==
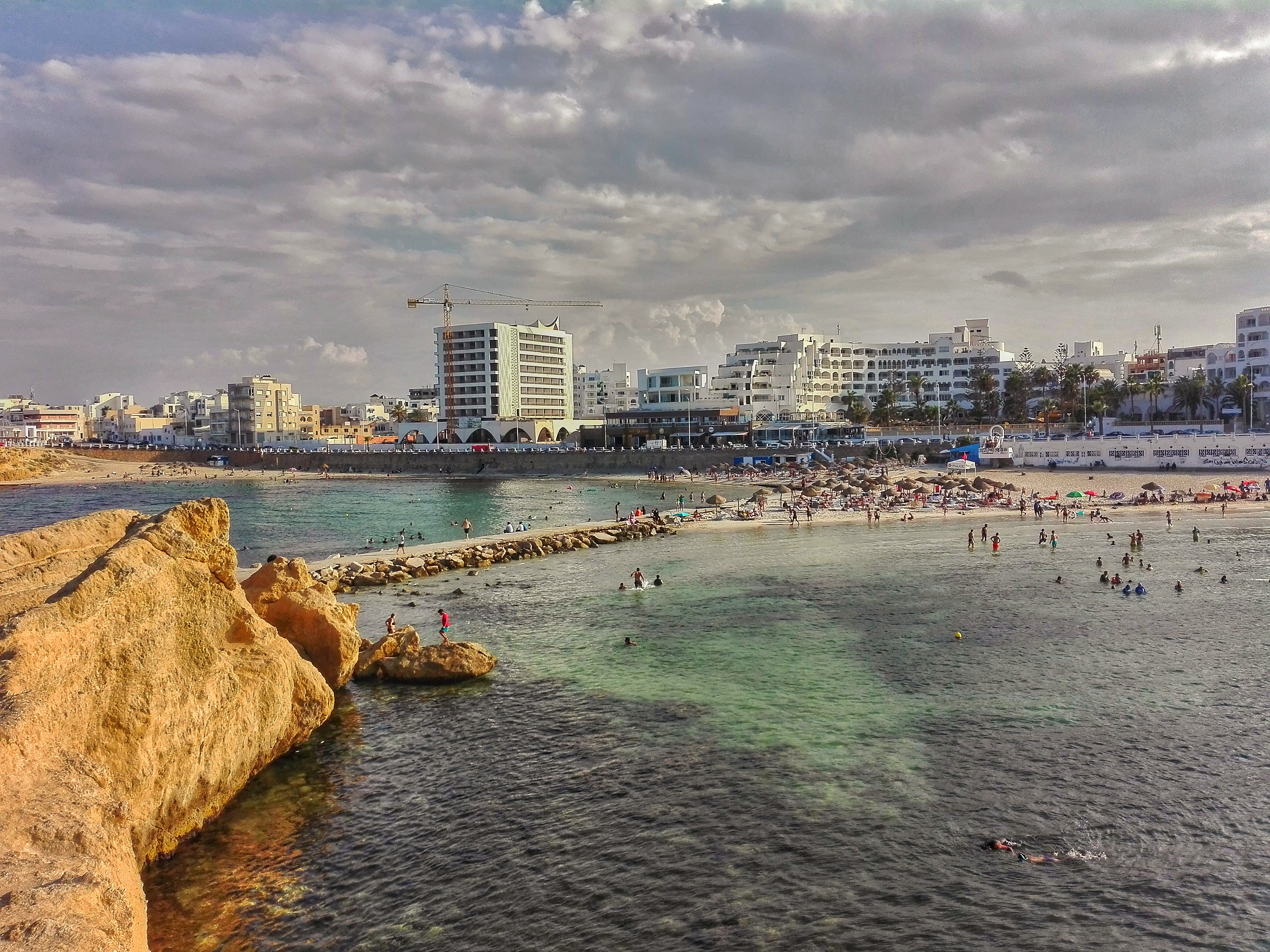
Monastir beach

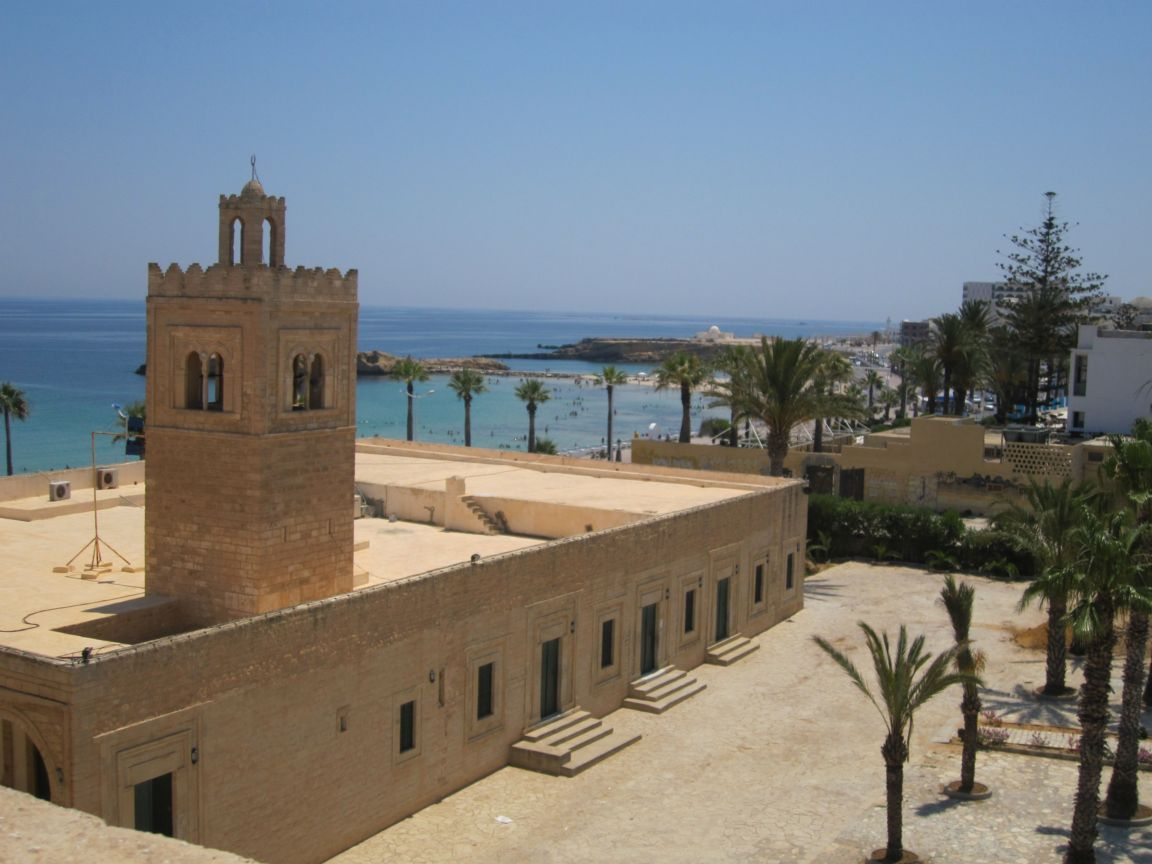
Great Mosque of Monastir

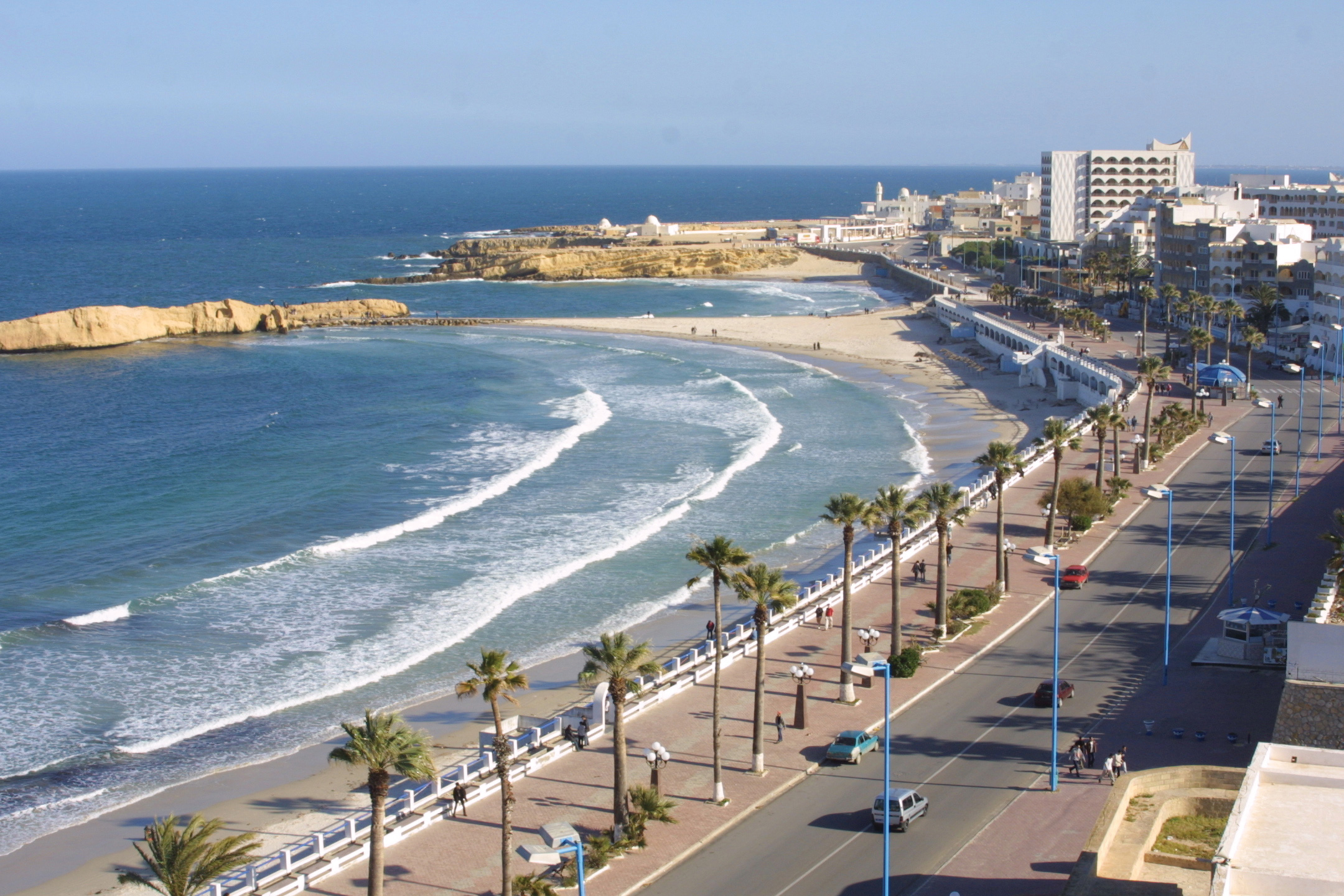
Al Qurayyah beach

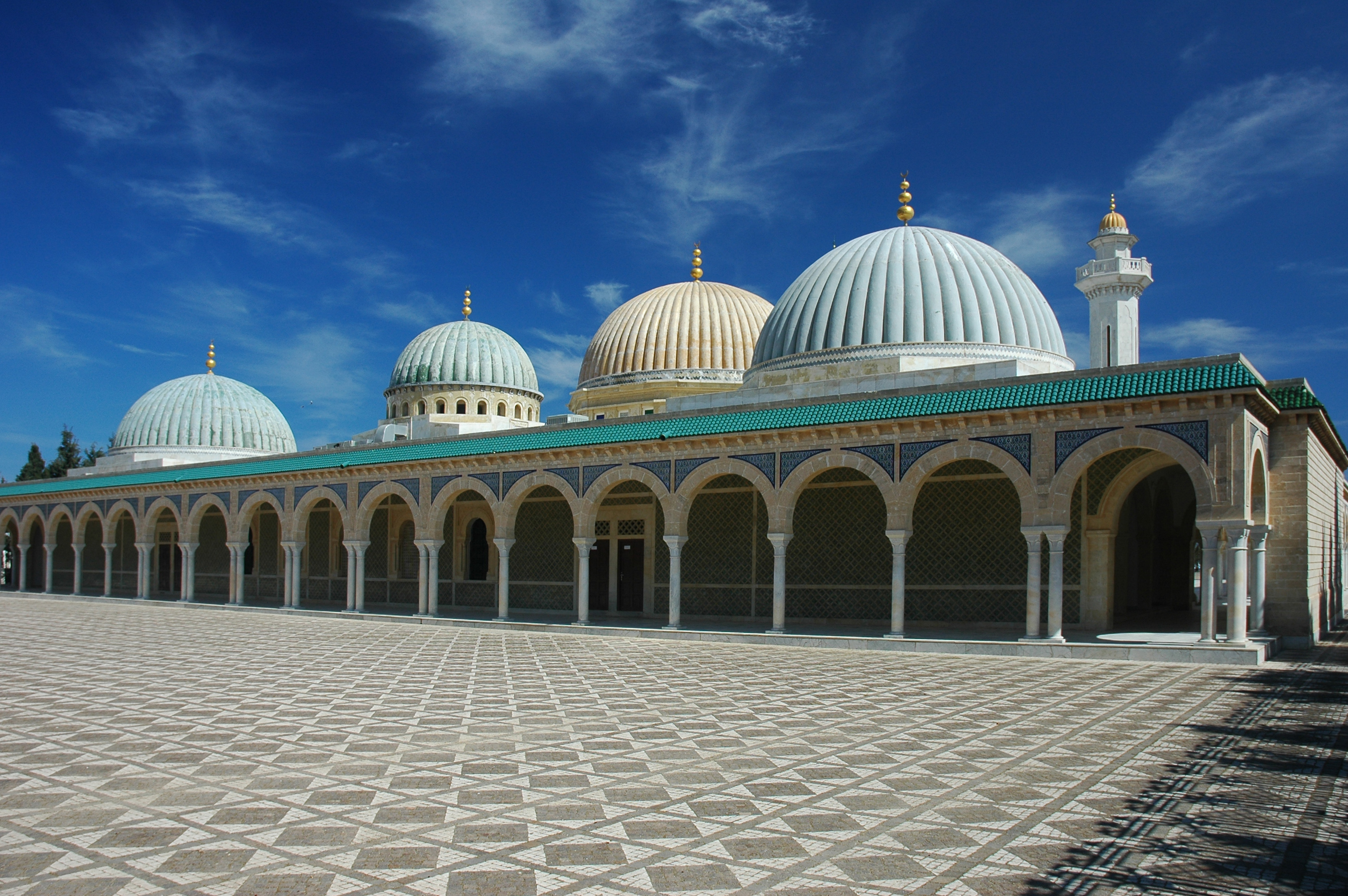
Habib Bourguiba Mausoleum

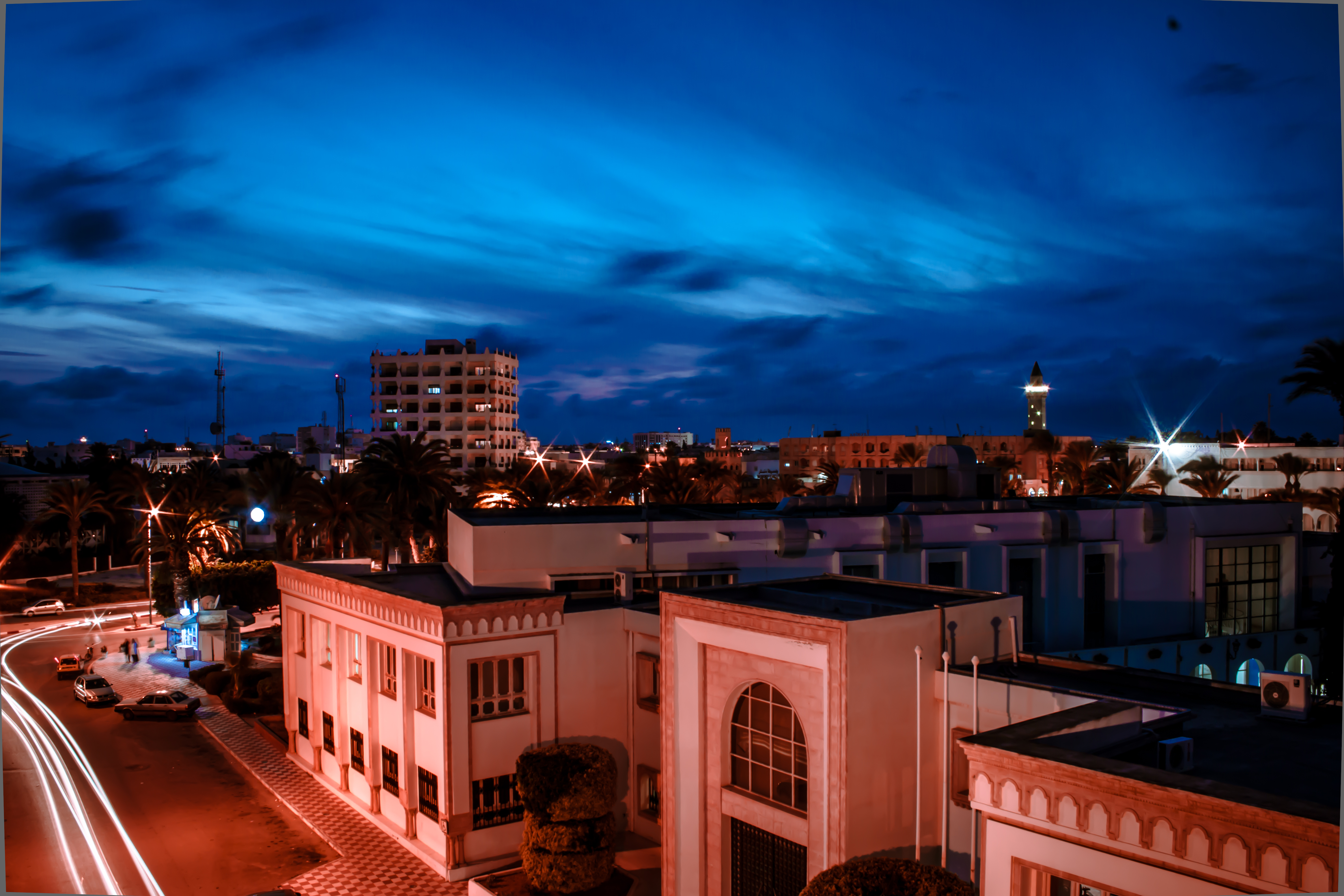
Monastir at night

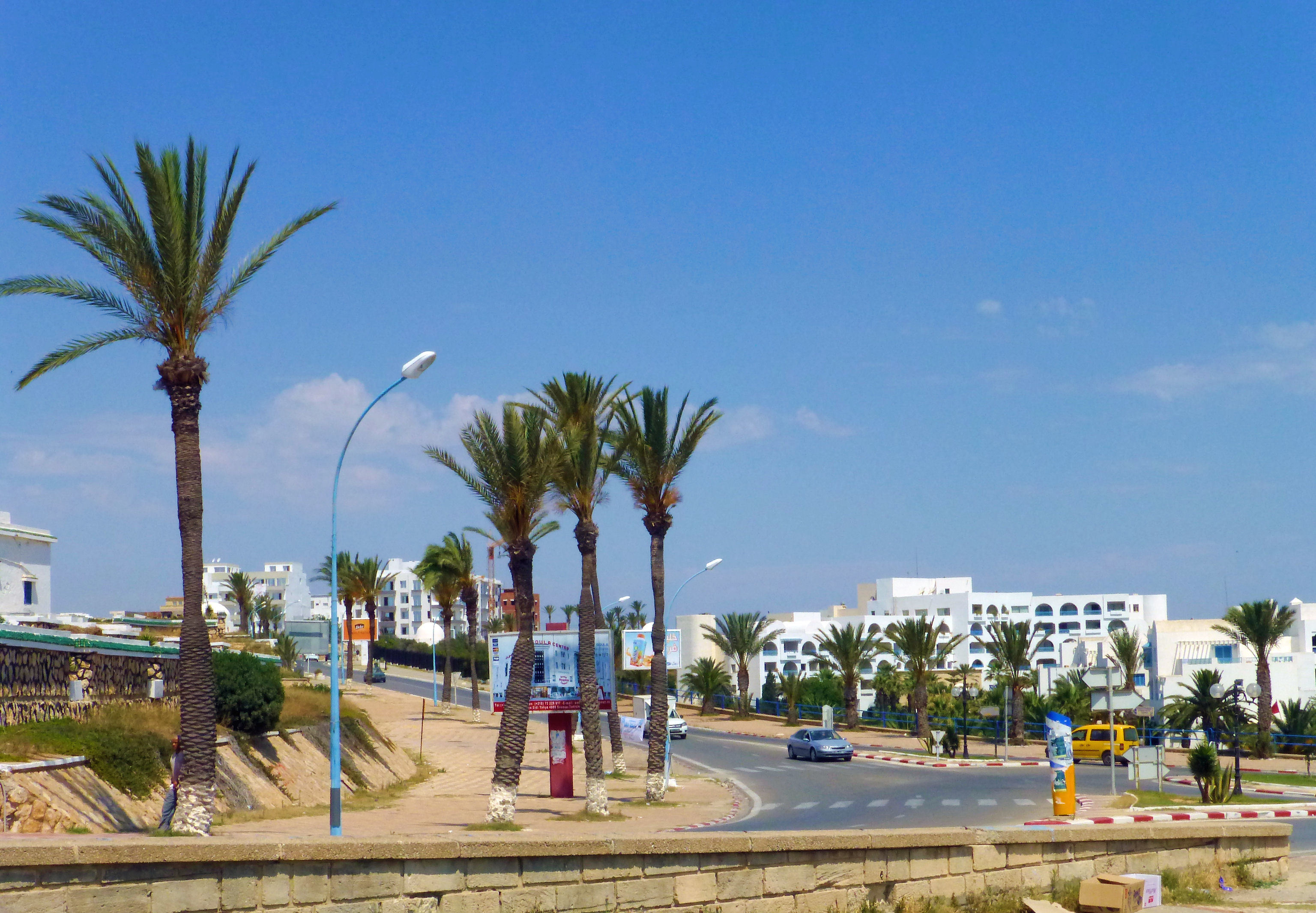
Street in Monastir

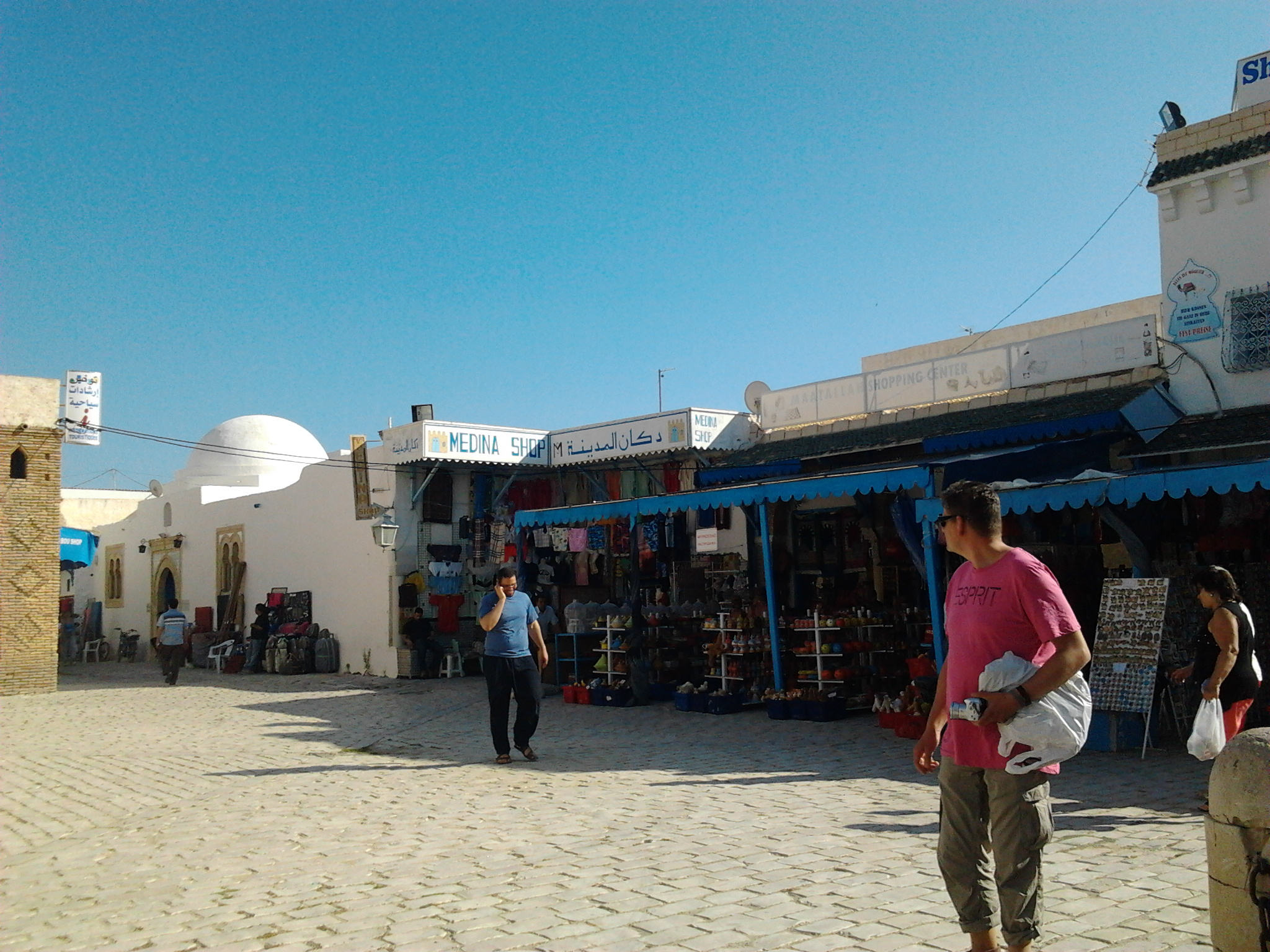
Street shops

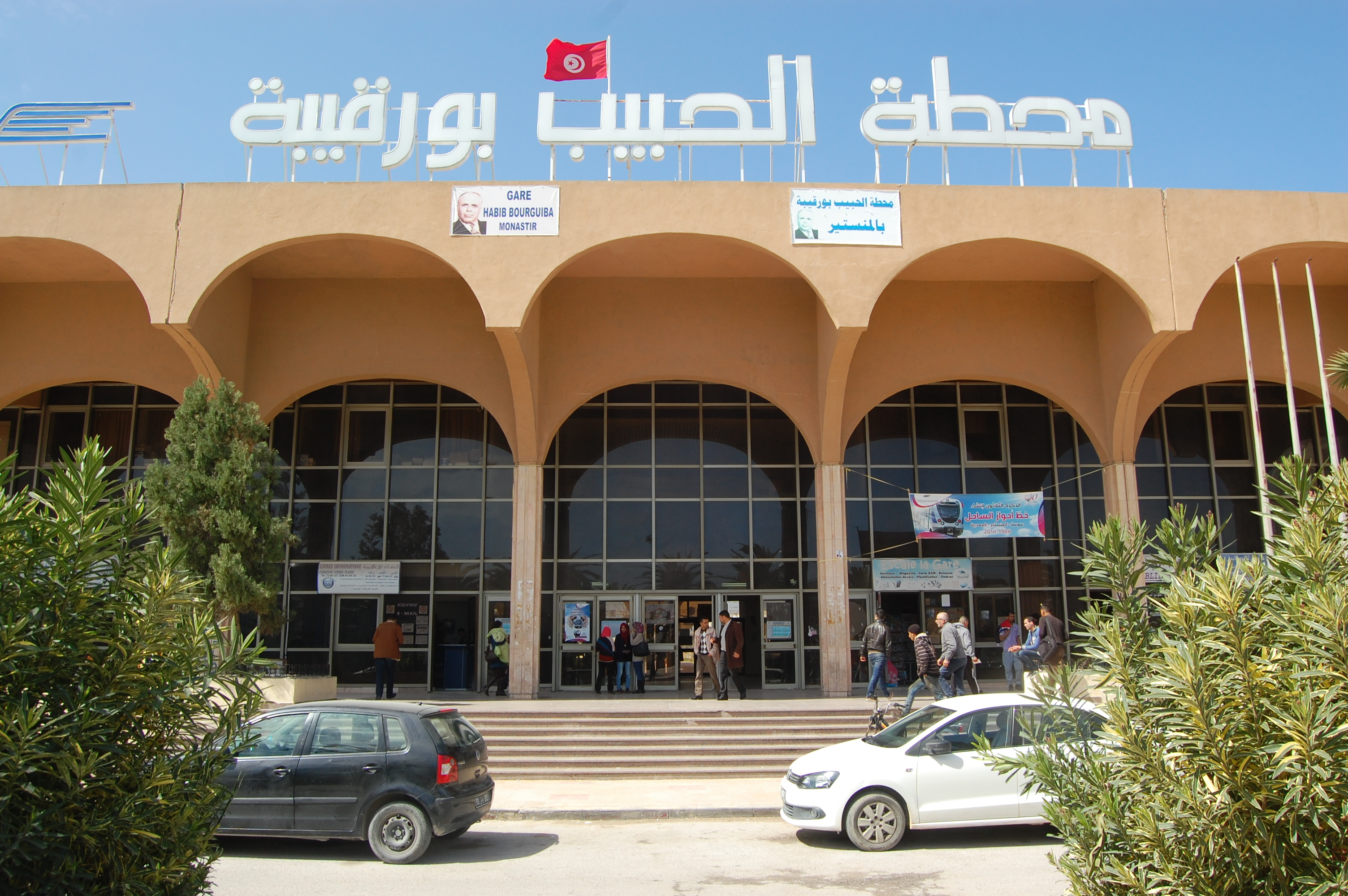
Habib Bourguiba station

== Neighbouring area ==
Monastir's northeastern territories lead into a place called Route de la Falaise, through which one can reach its most notable suburb, Skanes, which is 6 miles (9.7 kilometres) from Monastir's town centre. Hugging Tunisia's coastline, Skanes is a holiday resort known mostly for its professional golf courses; white, sandy beaches; clear blue sea; and hotels that fuse Moorish architecture with modern designs. It is frequented throughout the summer by tourists from around the world. They also come for the medina, where it is possible to sample fresh Tunisian cooking and bargain for local goods.

== See also ==
- Hotels Monastir
