= Keb Cuevas =

Filipino entrepreneur and journalist (born 1995)

- 蔡克文
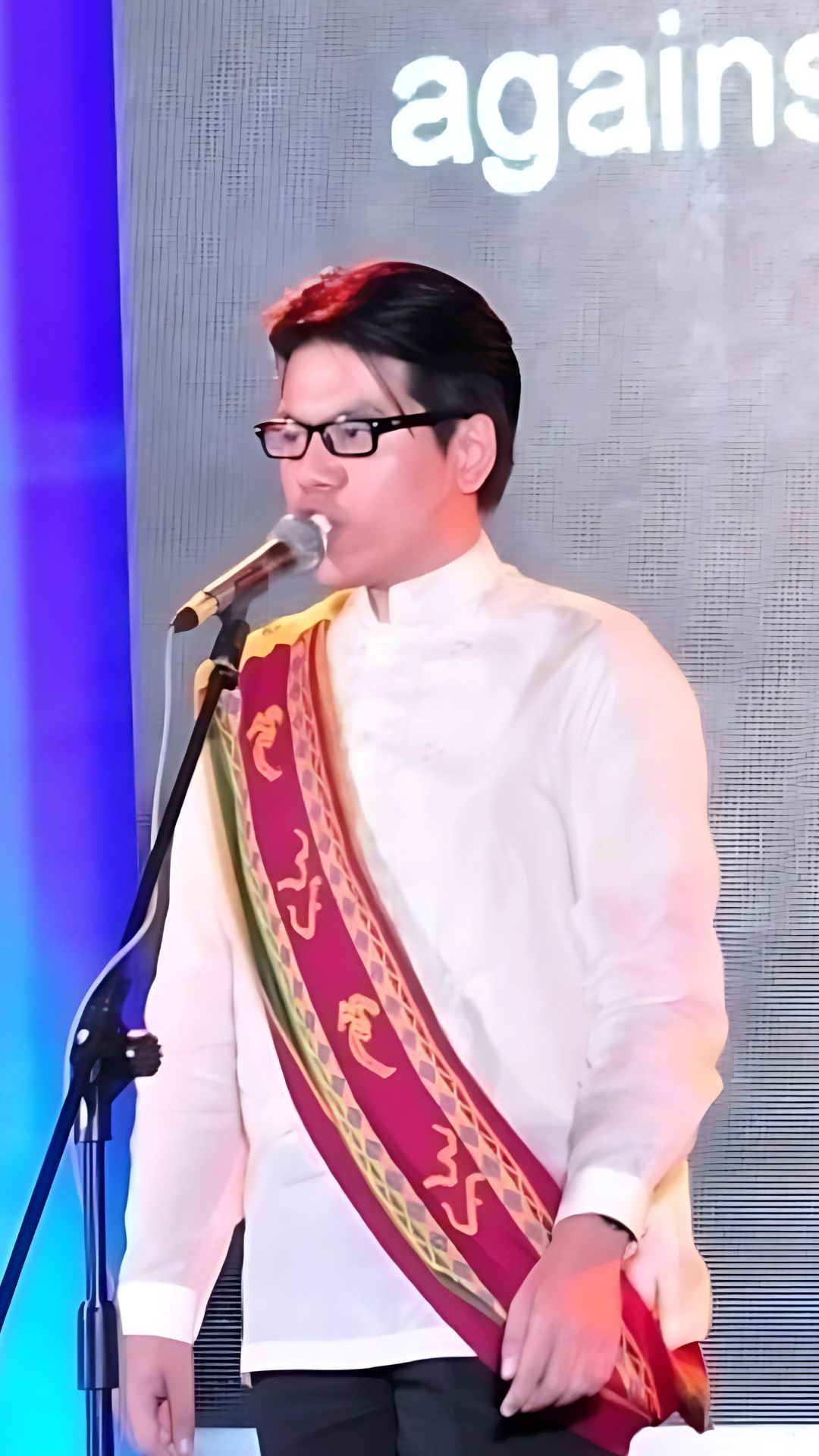
- Cuevas in 2017
- Born: Kevin San Miguel Cuevas; October 6, 1995 (age 31); Las Pinas City, Philippines
- Other names: KEB (singer); Kym Chua Valencia (drag)
- Education: UP Los Baños (BS); Brown University (YSEALI); TIP Manila (MS); UP Diliman (PhD); San Sebastian College – Recoletos (MLS-JD)
- Occupations: Entrepreneur; Agriculturist; Data scientist; Journalist; Drag artist; Singer
- Years active: 2017–present
- Known for: Science education content; Founder of Tagani
- Awards: TAYO Award (2016); Enactus Award (2016); YSEALI Fellow (2018); YSEALI Seeds Award (2019); 2030 Youth Champion Award (2020)
- Website: Official website

Keb Cuevas (Tagalog: [ˈkɛb ˈkwɛvas]; Chinese: 蔡克文; pinyin: Cài Kèwén; born Kevin San Miguel Cuevas; October 6, 1995), or mononymously KEB, is a Filipino technology entrepreneur and singer-songwriter. He is best known as the Chief Agriculturist and founder of Agriculturist PH (formerly Tagani), a digital agriculture platform, and for producing science education content on TikTok. Cuevas previously worked as a journalist for the Philippine social news website Rappler.

He produces music under the name "KEB" and performs as a drag artist as "Kym Chua Valencia."

In 2018, he was named one of U.S. Department of State's Young Southeast Asian Leaders Initiative (YSEALI) academic fellows for social entrepreneurship and economic development. He also gained public visibility as a contestant on the business reality competition series Project GO.

== Early life and education ==
Keb Cuevas was born as Kevin San Miguel Cuevas on October 6, 1995, in Las Piñas City and is of Chinese-Filipino descent. He is the first child of a tricycle driver and a sari-sari store owner and has a younger sister. Growing up, Cuevas started working at a very young age, participating in amateur singing contests to help finance his education, and helped run his family's computer shop business until he moved to Los Baños, Laguna for college. He completed his elementary education in 2008 at Almanza Elementary School, where he served as associate editor of the school paper.

Raised Roman Catholic, he finished high school at Saint Anthony School of Las Piñas as the school publication's editor-in-chief. He later pursued his initial years of college at Adamson University, both Catholic institutions. Over time, the Cuevas family embraced Mahayana Buddhism and he began practicing Wushu, a Chinese martial art.

He earned a bachelor's degree in agribusiness management at the University of the Philippines Los Baños and became a board-licensed agriculturist. During his time at UPLB, he founded Amiga Philippines, a project that taught financial accounting to women farmers in Calauan, Laguna. The initiative gained national recognition, becoming part of the Ten Accomplished Youth Organizations (TAYO) Awards of the National Youth Commission in 2016.

He then pursued advanced studies in economics at Brown University from a scholarship of the U.S. Department of State's Bureau of Cultural and Educational Affairs. He also pursued a Professional Science Master's Degree in data science at the Technological Institute of the Philippines Manila. In 2023, he was admitted to the Doctor of Philosophy in Data Science program at the University of the Philippines Diliman, further advancing his expertise in data science and its applications.

== Career ==
=== Journalism and science communication ===
Cuevas began his journalism career at Rappler, a Nobel Prize-winning social news network, where he worked under MovePH, its community engagement and digital journalism arm. His beats included data journalism, citizen journalism, disinformation, disaster preparedness, and innovation. His reporting and multimedia work focused on the growing impact of digital platforms, artificial intelligence, and organized disinformation campaigns on public discourse and governance.

Outside traditional media, Cuevas produces explainer videos on TikTok, where he discusses topics such as science education, food myths, economics and public policy. His content—ranging from debunking economic myths under Martial Law to clarifying misconceptions on food like margarine and butter—has garnered a following among youth audiences. He also covers urban agriculture, standards of identity for food, and board exam review content, offering science-backed guidance to students and general viewers.

=== Entrepreneurship and innovation policy ===
In 2019, at age 22, Cuevas co-founded Tagani, an agri-tech startup that began as an online marketplace and expanded into an education and digital solutions platform for farmers. Tagani also partnered with the Department of Agriculture under the Kadiwa program to enhance market access for smallholder farmers.

In 2021, Cuevas joined the National Economic and Development Authority as part of the National Innovation Council, where he became chief of the Innovation Policy Monitoring and Evaluation Division. He led the framework formulation of the National Innovation Agenda and Strategy Document, the flagship policy output mandated by the Philippine Innovation Act.

In 2023, he co-founded Taxikel, an on-demand delivery and tricycle ride-hailing application for rural communities based in Pangasinan.

=== Corporate and data science work ===
Since 2018, Cuevas has worked as a digital transformation consultant for government agencies and NGOs, using data science to improve public services and promote evidence-informed policy. He previously served as head of analytics at Solaire Resort & Casino and as head of data science for a cybersecurity company.

In 2023, he joined the National Institute of Physics and UP College of Engineering as a PhD student and associate fellow under the SyncBioOptics research group. His work focuses on network science and natural language processing. He has also taught data science at CIIT College of Arts and Technology.

== Advocacy work ==
=== Agricultural sustainability, climate resilience and mental health ===
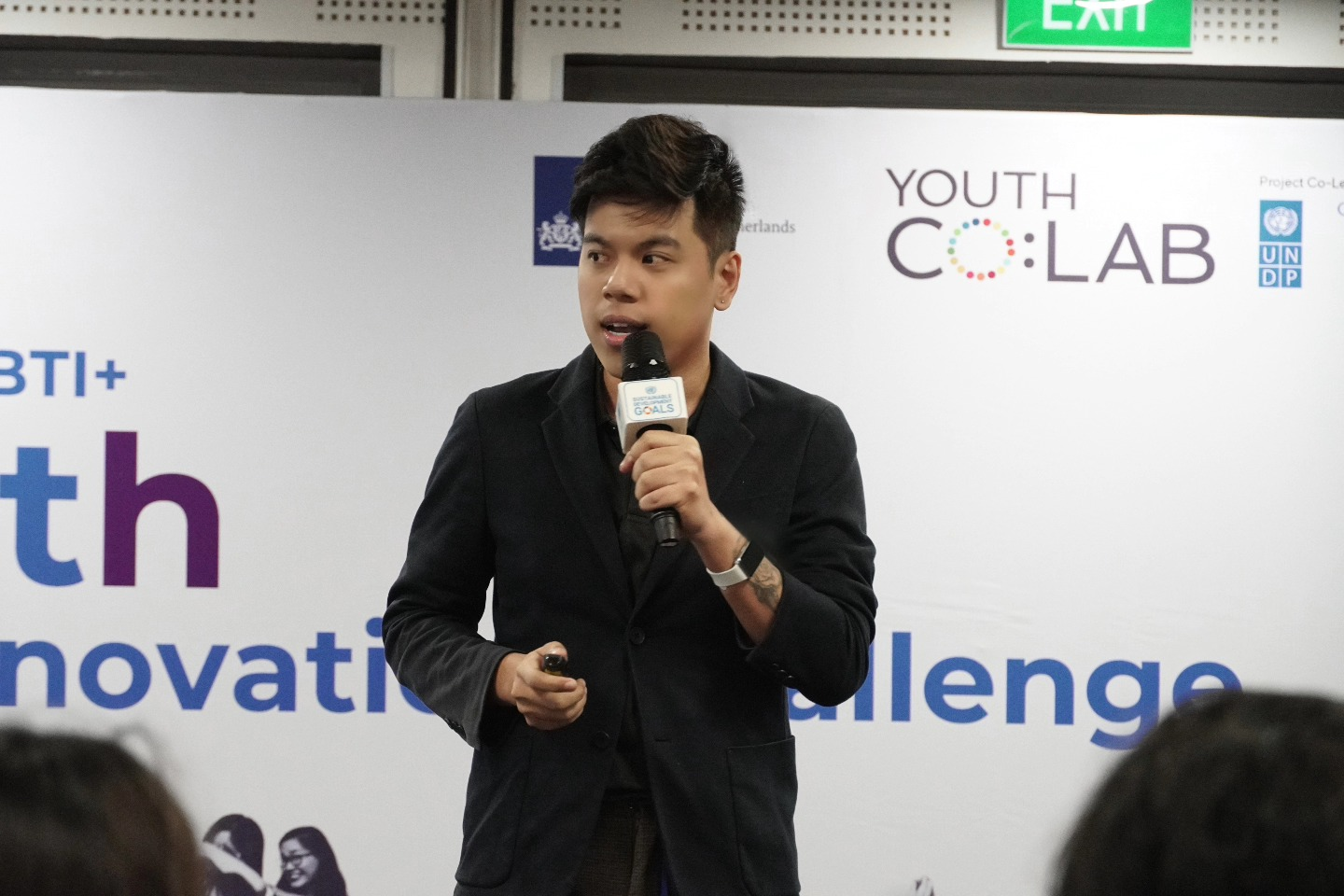
Cuevas speaks at a UNDP in Bangkok

As a licensed agriculturist, Cuevas has actively engaged in public education and policy advocacy related to agriculture and food systems. During the COVID-19 pandemic in the Philippines, he cautioned against repurposing used face masks as seedling bags, citing health and safety concerns. He explained that the porous material of masks causes them to degrade easily with watering and may harbor harmful bacteria, viruses, and fungi, posing risks to both plant health and human safety.

In 2020, Cuevas addressed systemic issues in the Philippine agricultural sector, particularly the economic vulnerability of farmers due to exploitative intermediaries. He pointed to the role of social enterprises and non-governmental organizations in supporting marginalized producers, while also proposing solutions such as the construction of additional postharvest facilities and the implementation of transparent pricing mechanisms to improve market access. He has also encouraged more conscious consumer behavior, urging Filipinos to be informed about the sources of their food and to support local producers.

Cuevas advocates for the modernization of agriculture through digital technologies and greater youth engagement in farming. Drawing inspiration from models in countries such as Kenya, he emphasizes the role of social media and e-commerce in connecting farmers to markets, disseminating knowledge, and transforming the public perception of agriculture as a viable and modern career path.

In 2021, Cuevas took part in the Department of Education’s Wellness Check Series, where he discussed the benefits of urban gardening for mental health. He highlighted how gardening can serve as a therapeutic practice, enhancing well-being and promoting environmental consciousness. He also offered practical guidance for establishing sustainable gardens in urban settings.

In partnership with Save the Philippine Seas in 2022, Cuevas emphasized the urgent need for climate change adaptation in agriculture. He identified climate-related threats such as extreme weather, shifting precipitation patterns, and the spread of plant diseases, and advocated for the use of climate-resilient crops, sustainable farming practices, and strong policies that promote environmental stewardship and food security.

=== LGBTQ+ rights, gender equality and cultural advocacy ===
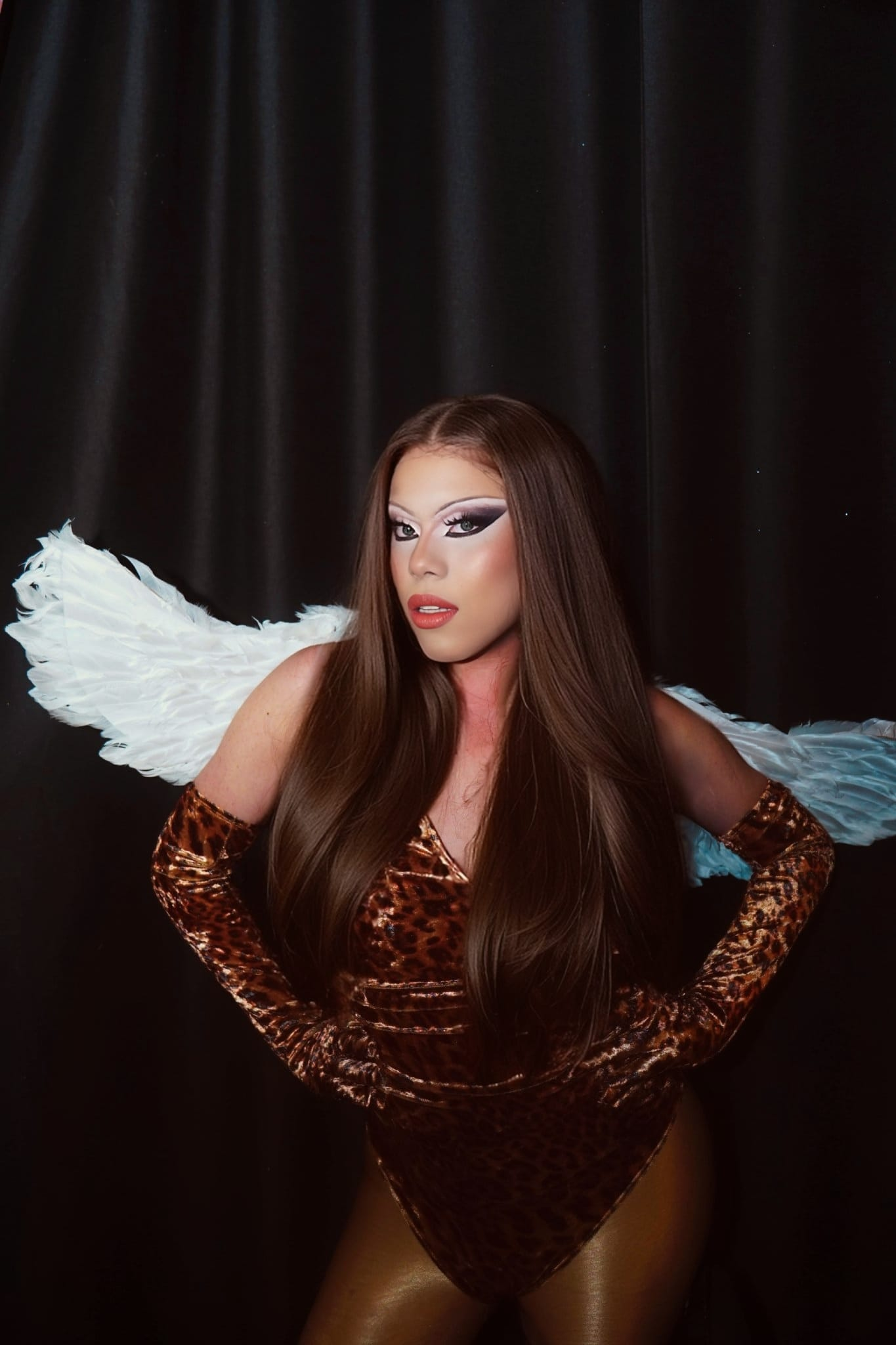
Kym Chua Valencia is the drag persona of Keb Cuevas

Cuevas is a vocal advocate for women's rights and the LGBTQ+ community, with a focus on anti-discrimination, inclusion, and sexual and reproductive health. He supports the passage of the SOGIE Equality Bill and has expressed public support for same-sex marriage and greater access to HIV/AIDS prevention, including the promotion of PrEP.

His advocacy extends to collaborative initiatives with platforms like TikTok and Queer Safe Spaces, where he helps amplify queer visibility and awareness campaigns. Cuevas has also participated in events such as pride marches and other community-driven gatherings celebrating LGBTQ+ expression.

In 2021, Cuevas became involved in public discourse surrounding Nas Daily and his online learning content featuring tribal tattoo artist Whang-od. Cuevas raised concerns about cultural appropriation and representation, contributing to broader discussions on ethical storytelling and responsible social entrepreneurship in the Philippines.

== Kym Chua Valencia (drag artist) ==
Kym Chua Valencia, sometimes referred to as Kym Chua or mononymously as Miss Kym, is the drag persona of by Keb Cuevas, particularly in the Filipino drag and LGBTQ+ advocacy scene. As Kym, he is known as a singing drag artist, events host, and community organizer, actively promoting queer visibility and inclusivity. Kym is a drag daughter of Riri Valencia Andrews, drag sister of Arizona Brandy and the matriarch of Casa de Valencia.

The name Kym was given by fellow drag artist Salmo Nella, who originally introduced him as Kimberly Valencia at Hoesik Bar & Lounge. As a nod to his Chinese heritage, he added Chua to the name, while Kym was inspired by the popular Chinese-Filipino actress Kim Chiu.

== Television ==
Year	Title	Role	Notes
2021	Project GO	Himself	Contestant
