= Tagani =

Software company in the Philippines

Tagani Inc.
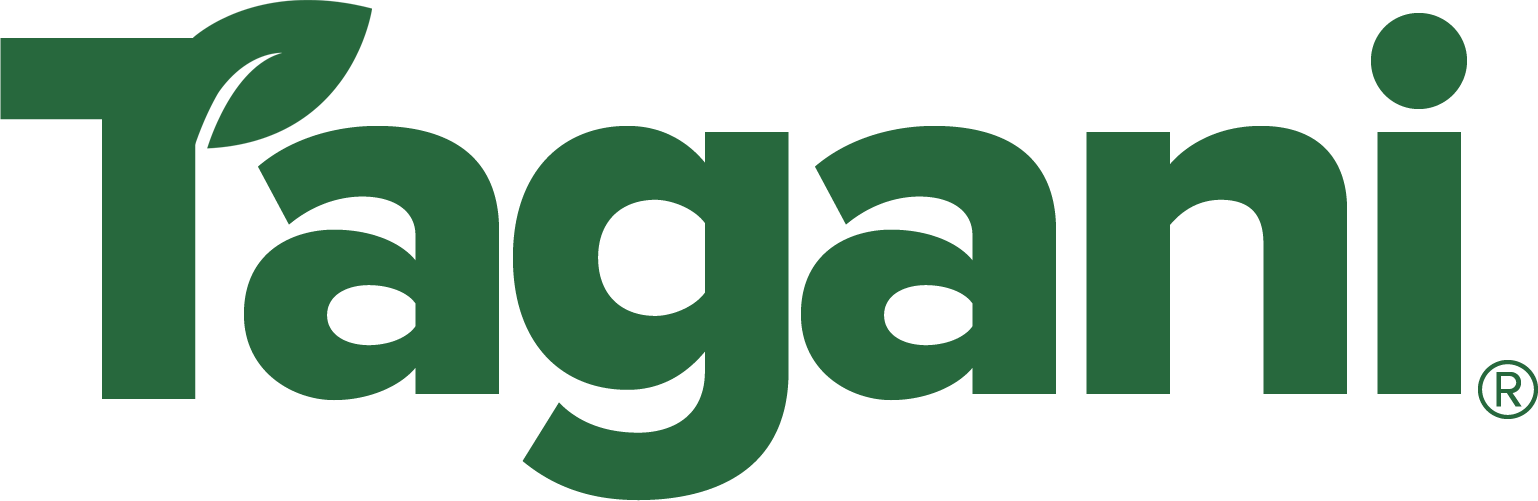
- Formerly: Amiga Philippines, Tagani.ph
- Company type: Startup company
- Industry: Technology; Digital Agriculture
- Founded: October 6, 2016; 9 years ago
- Founders: Keb Cuevas; Yvonne Manalo
- Headquarters: Asian Institute of Management, Makati, Philippines
- Key people: Keb Cuevas (Chief Agriculturist & CEO)
- Owner: Keb Cuevas
- Website: agriculturistph.com

Tagani Inc., commonly known as Tagani, was a Philippine agricultural startup company founded by Keb Cuevas in 2016. It was most notable for e-commerce platform for farm produce. Tagani also developed services such as e-learning for agribusiness and its proprietary digital farm management software platform. The company was headquartered at the Asian Institute of Management in Makati City, Philippines.

The name Tagani is derived from the Tagalog word tag-ani ("harvest season"), composed of tag- ("time of" or "season of") and ani ("harvest"). It also means the Tagalog deity of good harvest, Tag-ani.

In 2019, Tagani was named by e27.co as one of the Top 100 startups in Asia Pacific representing the Philippines. As of August 2021, the company has permanently ceased operations following its Founder and CEO's appointment at the National Economic and Development Authority.

== History ==
Tagani began as a college project of Keb Cuevas as Amiga Philippines under Enactus UPLB in 2016. The initiative aimed at teaching women farmers a simplified version of accounting translated in the Filipino language, to improve financial literacy in rural communities.

In 2017, it gained national recognition when it won the Ten Accomplished Youth Organizations (TAYO) Awards under the Livelihood and Entrepreneurship category. Following this success, the project evolved into Tagani Inc., a formal corporation, in August 2018 and represented the Philippines at the ASEAN Young Entrepreneurs Forum in Ho Chi Minh City, Vietnam. The company also participated in the Young Southeast Asian Leaders Initiative program of Brown University during the same year.

Transitioning from a project to a profit-driven organization, Tagani developed from using a basic paper-based accounting system to a more advanced Tagani farm management system (FMS). This system was co-developed with Tanibox, an Indonesia-based non-profit organization. In a significant partnership with the Department of Agriculture, Tagani integrated e-commerce capabilities into its platform, facilitating connections between farmers and local markets through an API linked to the Tagani FMS.

Despite these advancements, the challenges posed by the COVID-19 pandemic in the Philippines, coupled with a lack of further funding, impeded the continued development of the Tagani FMS. This setback ultimately led to the discontinuation of the organization's operations in August 2021.

== See also ==
- Digital agriculture
- TAYO Awards
