= Young Southeast Asian Leaders Initiative =

US Department of State project

YSEALI
- Young Southeast Asian Leaders Initiative
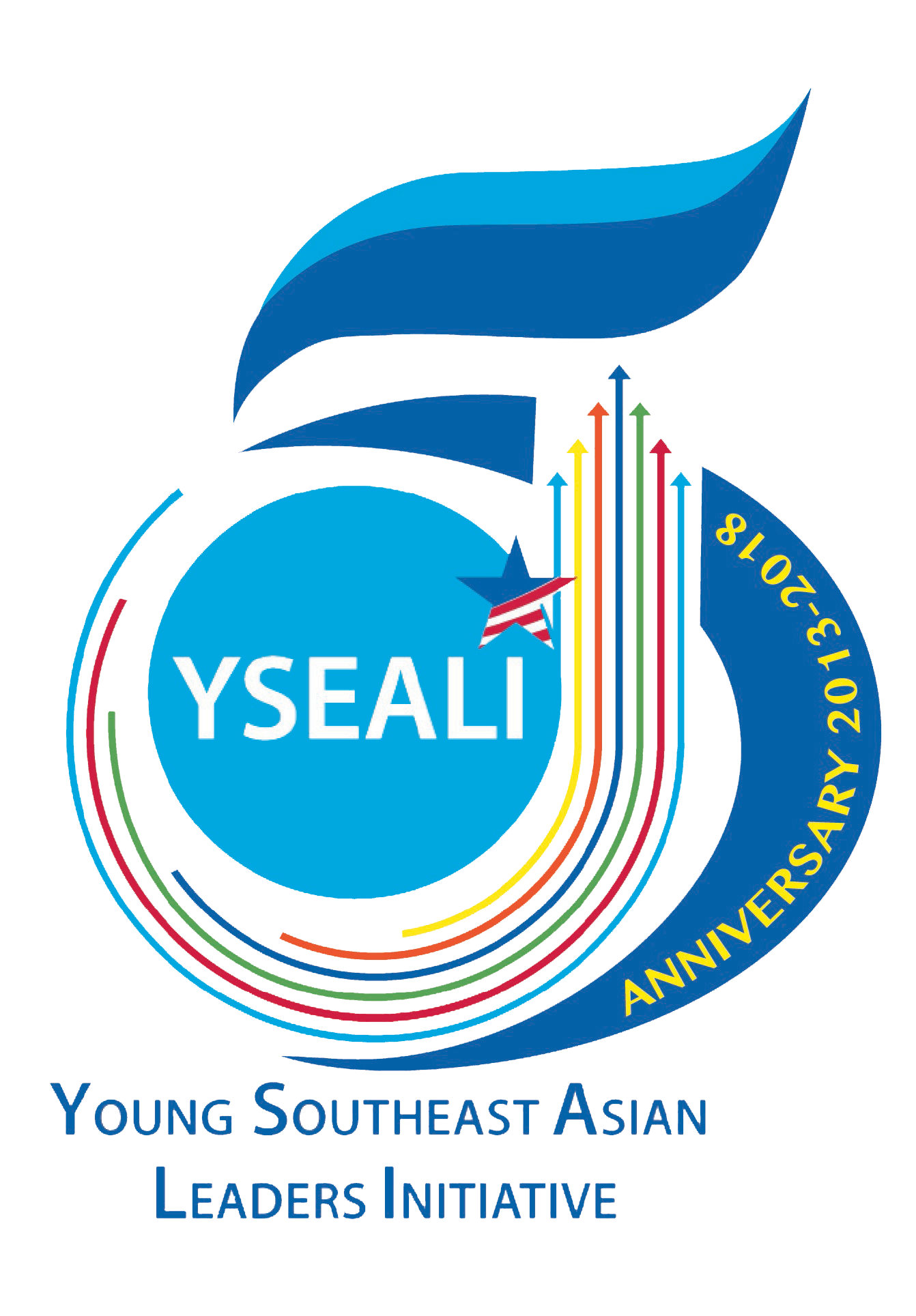
- YSEALI's 5th year anniversary logo in 2018
- Awarded for: Outstanding work and potentials as emerging leader from Southeast Asia
- Sponsored by: Bureau of Educational and Cultural Affairs (U.S. Department of State)
- Location: United States of America
- Eligibility: 18-35 years old from Timor Leste or any ASEAN country
- Motto: Never Too Young To Lead
- Established: December 2013
- Website: http://yseali.state.gov
- Related: Young African Leaders Initiative, Fulbright Scholarship, United States Cultural Exchange Programs

The Young Southeast Asian Leaders Initiative, also known as YSEALI (pronounced /waɪˈsiːli/), is a highly-competitive cultural exchange program for Southeast Asian emerging leaders sponsored by the U.S. Bureau of Education and Cultural Affairs. YSEALI programs are known to have 1-2% acceptance rates and are usually awarded to emerging leaders with outstanding work and potentials in their chosen fields or advocacies.

The initiative was launched by President Barack Obama in Manila in December 2013 as a way to strengthen leadership development, networking, and cultural exchange among emerging leaders within the age range of 18 to 35 years old from the 10 member-states of the Association of Southeast Asian Nations and Timor Leste. YSEALI's programs include prestigious exchange fellowship programs to the United States, professional short courses and diplomas, virtual and on-ground workshops within Southeast Asia, and seed grant funding opportunities.

The programs fall under the key core themes of civic engagement, sustainable development, economic development, governance, and the environment.

Alumni of YSEALI programs later assume key positions in government, civil societies, and corporations after their programs. Notable alumni of YSEALI include Vico Sotto, Syed Saddiq, Carrie Tan, and Lee Chean Chung. As of September 2020, the program has more than 5,000 alumni and 150,000 members across member countries.

In 2021, Texas representative Joaquin Castro filed a bill in the US House of Representatives to strengthen YSEALI as a law.

== YSEALI Academic Fellowships ==
The YSEALI Academic Fellowship Program which brings the participating delegation from each Southeast Asian country to study in an academic institution in the United States for six weeks to learn about their chosen advocacy, comparable to the Young African Leaders Initiative's Mandela Washington Fellowship program.

Institutions that have hosted the Academic Fellowship Program are the following:

- Arizona State University
- Brown University
- East-West Center
- Kennesaw State University
- Northern Illinois University
- Portland State University
- Temple University
- University of Connecticut
- University of Montana
- University of Massachusetts Amherst
- University of Nebraska Omaha
- University of Texas at Austin

== YSEALI Seeds for the Future ==
The YSEALI Seeds for the Future is a small grants competition for youth-led innovative projects in Southeast Asia established by the U.S. Mission to ASEAN, as implemented by Cultural Vistas. Since its establishment in 2017, the YSEALI Seeds for the Future has provided funding to 100 youth-led projects within the ASEAN region and Timor Leste funding at most US$15,000 for each successful winner.

== Notable alumni ==
=== Brunei ===
- Ain Bandial, editor of "The Scoop" news
- Queenie Chong, Member of Legislative Council

=== Philippines ===
- Vico Sotto, Mayor of Pasig
- Joyce Pring, Radio and television host
- Keb Cuevas, Agriculturist and journalist
- Louise Mabulo, Chef and environmentalist
- Anna Oposa, Marine conservationist

=== Singapore ===
- Carrie Tan, Member of Parliament

=== Malaysia ===
- Syed Saddiq, Member of Parliament, former Minister of Youth and Sports
- Lee Chean Chung, Member of Parliament
