= National Innovation Council =

National Innovation Council may refer to:

- National Innovation Council (India)
- National Innovation Council (Philippines)
