= Malaya Cherepakha =

Small river that flows into the Azov Sea

Coordinates: 47°13′52″N 38°56′09″E

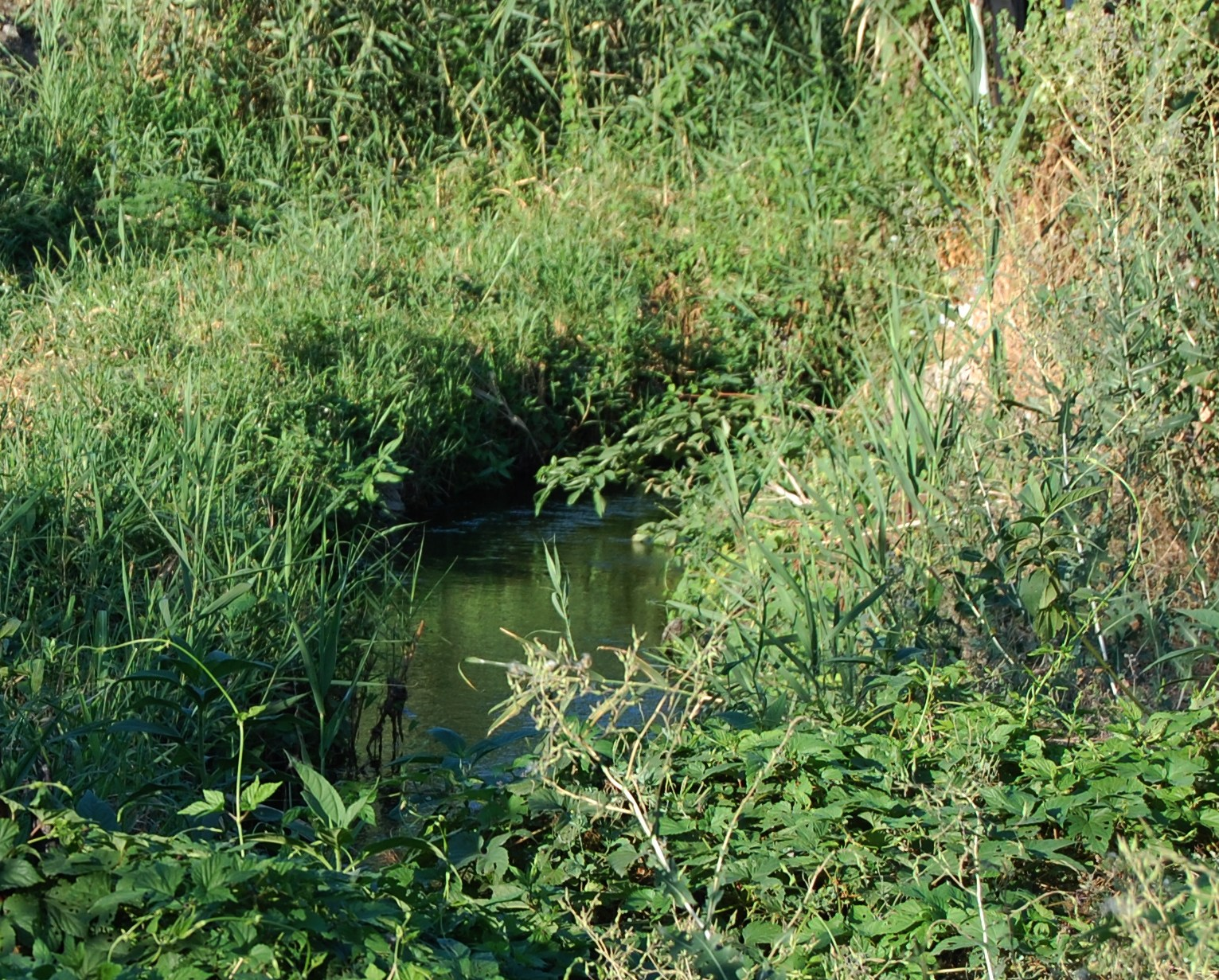
Photo of Malaya Cherepakha River taken in 2014

Malaya Cherepakha (Little Turtle in English; Russian: Малая Черепаха) is a small river that flows through Taganrog (Rostov Oblast, Russian Federation) into the Azov Sea.

== Description ==
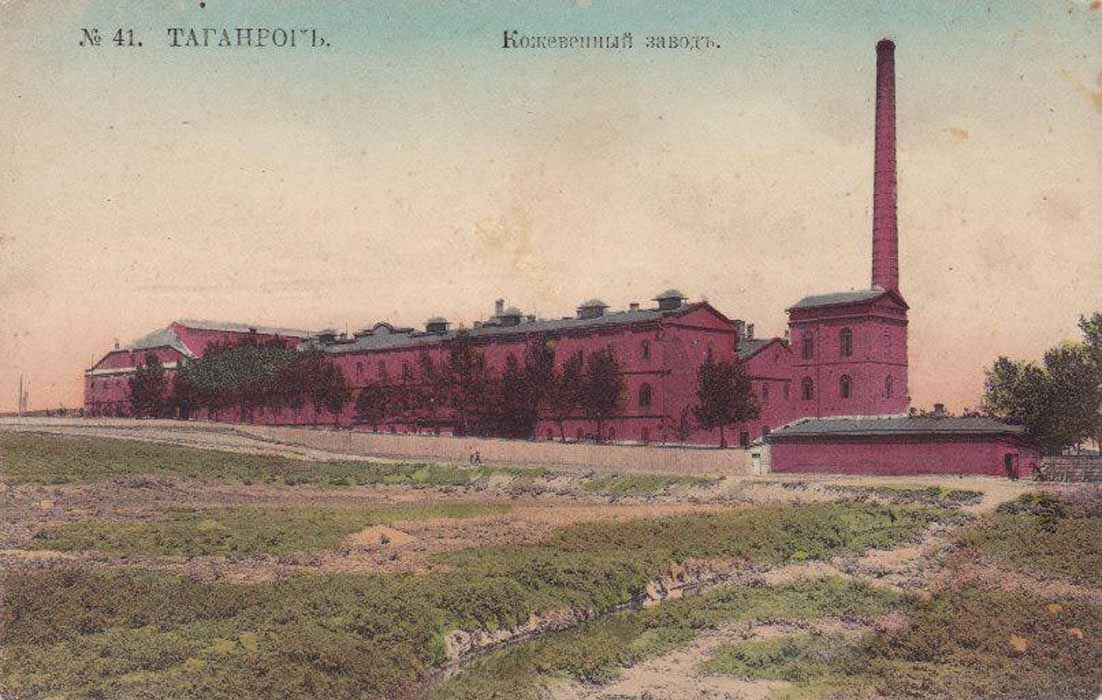
Taganrof Tannery Factory

The riverbed of Malaya Cherepakha is situated in Malaya Cherepakha Gully. The total length of the river is 3 kilometers. It flows into the Sea of Azov through the territory of Taganrog Tannery Factory.

The canal bed of the Little Turtle is silted, the slopes are washed out and covered with household rubbish. The silt layer at the bottom of the river reaches more than 4 meters.

According to data of the monitoring of water quality in 2005, the waters of Malaya Cherepakha River contained an excess of ammonium, nitrites, phosphates, manganese, iron, petroleum products, nickel, vanadium and molybdenum. Correspondingly, bottom sediments are equally heavily contaminated with heavy metals.

Along the open section of the riverbed there are areas that are prone to flooding and waterlogging: these are Oktyabrskaya and Sotsialisticheskya streets.

In February 2015 was announced the initiative of the students of the Taganrog College of Marine Instrument Making who together with other participants and curators of the SIFE to clear the channel of the river.
