= Bachelor of Science =

Undergraduate academic degree

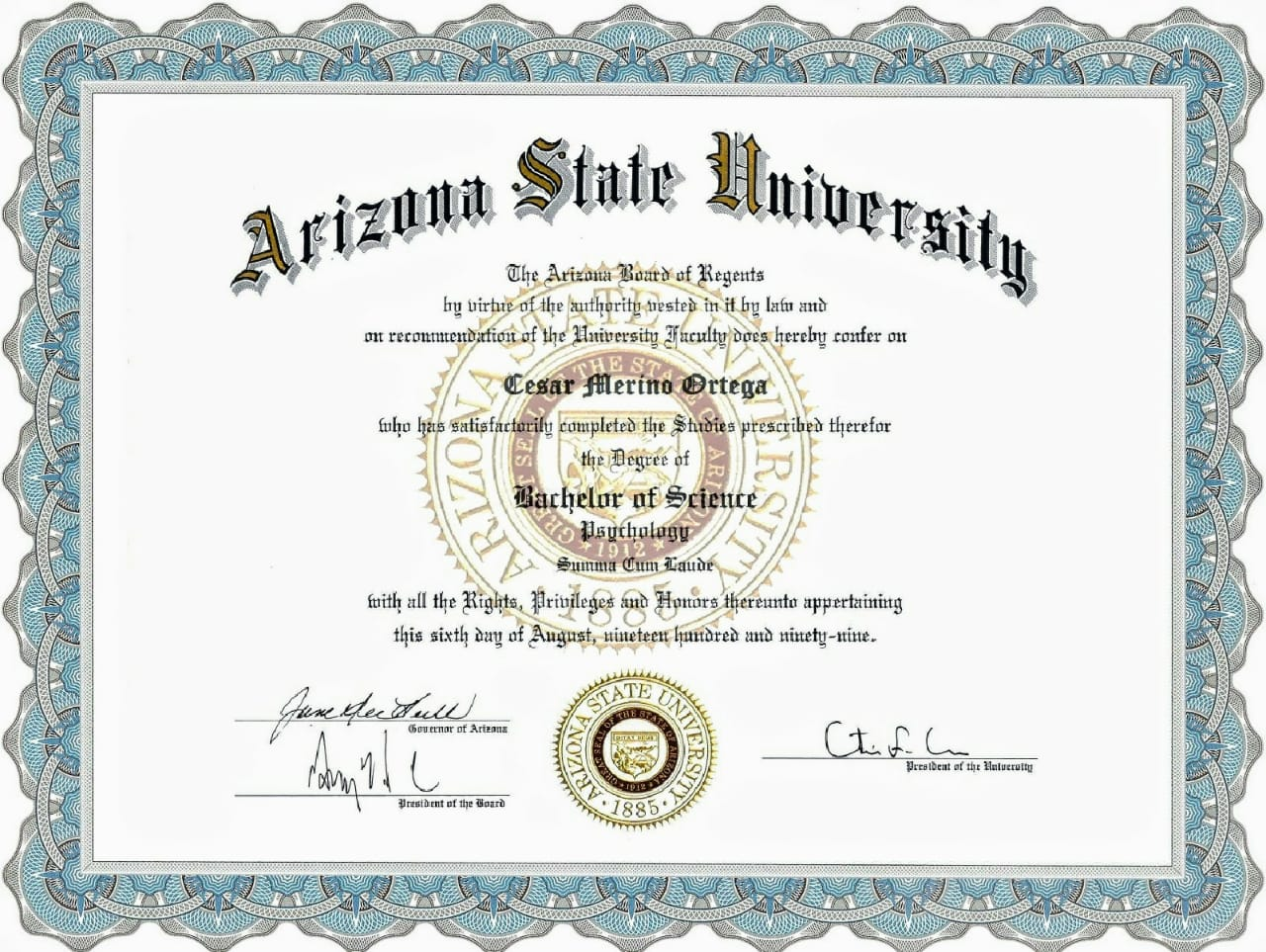
- A Bachelor of Science diploma from Arizona State University
- Acronym: BSc; BS; SB; ScB
- Type: Bachelor's degree
- Duration: 3 to 5 years

A Bachelor of Science (BS, BSc, SB, or ScB; from the Latin scientiae baccalaureus) is a bachelor's degree awarded upon the completion and fulfillment of the requirements of an undergraduate program.

The first university to admit a student to the degree of Bachelor of Science was the University of London in 1860. In the United States, the Lawrence Scientific School first conferred the degree in 1851, followed by the University of Michigan in 1855. Nathaniel Shaler, who was Harvard's Dean of Sciences, wrote in a private letter that "the degree of Bachelor of Science came to be introduced into our system through the influence of Louis Agassiz, who had much to do in shaping the plans of this School."

Whether Bachelor of Science or Bachelor of Arts degrees are awarded in particular subjects varies between universities. For example, an economics student may graduate as a Bachelor of Arts in one university but as a Bachelor of Science in another, and occasionally, both options are offered. (Note: E.g., West Virginia University (WVU) BS in Economics; WVU BA in economics) At some universities, even graduates in mathematics and the sciences become Bachelors of Arts, (Note: E.g., Wesleyan University) while other institutions offer only the Bachelor of Science degree, even in non-science fields. (Note: E.g., Georgia Institute of Technology's BS degrees in International Affairs and Modern Languages and in Applied Languages and Intercultural studies)

At American universities that offer both Bachelor of Arts and Bachelor of Science degrees in the same discipline, the Bachelor of Science degree is usually more focused on that particular discipline and is targeted toward students intending to pursue graduate school or a profession in that discipline.

== International differences ==
In some institutions, there are historical and traditional reasons that govern the granting of BS or BA degrees regardless of the disciplines offered. Georgetown University's School of Foreign Service awards the Bachelor of Science in Foreign Service (BSFS) degrees to all of its undergraduates, although many students major in humanities-oriented fields such as international history or culture and politics. University of Pennsylvania's Wharton School awards the BS in Economics to all of its undergraduates, regardless if the candidates major in economics or not. The London School of Economics offers BSc degrees in practically all subject areas, even those normally associated with the arts and humanities. Northwestern University's School of Communication grants the Bachelor of Science in Journalism degrees in all of its programs of study, including theater, dance, and radio/television/film. Meanwhile, the Oxbridge universities almost exclusively award the BA as a first degree.

The decision to grant a BS or BA degree at some institutions also depends on the constituent colleges, even when the candidate pursues the same or similar subjects. For instance, Cornell University offers a BS degree in computer science from its College of Engineering and a BA degree in computer science from its College of Arts and Sciences. Likewise, for candidates majoring in computer science, Columbia University offers BS degrees for those enrolled in the School of Engineering and Applied Science but awards BA degrees for graduates of Columbia College. At Harvard University, the same undergraduate degree in computer science can be an A.B. if taken at Harvard College or Harvard John A. Paulson School of Engineering and Applied Sciences, and an A.L.B. at Harvard Extension School.

=== Argentina ===
In Argentina most university degrees are given as a license in a discipline. They are specific to a field and awarded to students upon completion of a course of study which lasts at least four and usually five years. In most cases, at the end of a course and as a mandatory condition for its completion (and ultimately, to obtain a degree), students are compelled to produce an original research project related to their field. This project is usually referred to as a thesis (although the term actually corresponds to post-graduate studies).

=== Australia, New Zealand and South Africa ===
In Australia, the BSc is generally a three to four-year degree. An honours year or a master's by research degree is required to progress on to the stage of Doctor of Philosophy (PhD).

In New Zealand, in some cases, the honours degree comprises an additional postgraduate qualification. In other cases, students with strong performance in their second or third year, are invited to extend their degree to an additional year, with a focus on research, granting access to doctoral programs.

In South Africa, the BSc is taken over three years, while the postgraduate BSc (Hons) entails an additional year of study. Admission to the honours degree is on the basis of a sufficiently high average in the BSc major; an honours degree is required for MSc level study, and admission to a doctorate is via the MSc.

=== Brazil ===
In Brazil, a Bachelor of Science degree is an undergraduate academic degree and is equivalent to a BSc (Hons). It could take from 4 to 6 years (8 to 12 periods) to complete, is also more specific and could be applied for Scientific Arts courses (like Engineering, Maths, Physics, etc.), somewhat is called Human Art courses in Brazil (like History, Portuguese and Literature and Lawyer studies for example) as well as for Health Arts (like Medicine, Nursery, Zootechnique, Veterinary and Biology for example). To be able to start the bachelor's degree in Brazil the candidate must prove to be proficient in different disciplines and have at least the accumulated Preliminary, Medium and High School degrees accomplished with the minimum merit of 60% to 70% of the degrees and a correspondent study period that can vary from 10 to 12 years minimum. The Bachelor of Science courses in Brazilian Universities normally have the first 1 to 2 years (first 2 to 4 periods) of basic fundamental disciplines (like for example Calculus I, II, III and IV for some engineering courses, Geometry basics and advanced, Analytical Laboratories experiments in Mechanics, Optics, Magnetism, etc.) and the last 2 to 3 years disciplines more related to the professional fields of that Bachelor of Science (for example Units Operations, Thermodynamics, Chemical Reactors, Industrial Processes, Kinetics for Chemical Engineering for example). Some disciplines are prerequisite to others and in some universities, the student is not allowed to course any discipline for the entire next period if he was unsuccessful in just one prerequisite discipline of the present period. Usually, the Bachelor of Science courses demand a one-year mandatory probation period by the end of the course (internship in the specific professional area, like a training period), followed by relatively elaborate written and oral evaluations. To get the certification as BSc, most universities require that the students achieve the accomplishment of 60% to 70% in all the "obligatory disciplines", plus the supervisioned and approved training period (like a supervisioned internship period), the final thesis of the course, and in some BSc programs, the final exam test. The final exam also is required so far. To be a professor, a Bachelor of Sciences is required to get a Licenciature degree, which lasts on top of the periods already studied until getting the BSc (Hons), plus 2 to 3 periods (1 to 1.5 years). With a master's degree (MSc) is also possible, which takes 3 to 5 periods more (1.5 to 2.5 years more).

=== Chile ===
In Chile, the completion of a university program leads to an academic degree as well as a professional title. The academic degree equivalent to Bachelor of Science is "Licenciado en Ciencias", which can be obtained as a result of completing a 4–6 year program. However, in most cases, 4-year programs will grant a Bachelor of Applied Science (Spanish: "Licenciatura en Ciencias Aplicadas") degree, while other 4-year programs will not grant to an academic degree.

=== Continental Europe ===
Many universities in Europe are changing their systems into the BA/MA system and in doing so also offering the full equivalent of a BSc or MSc (see Bologna Process).

=== Czech Republic ===
Universities in the Czech Republic are changing their systems into the Bachelor of Science/Master of Science system and in doing so also offering the full equivalent of a BSc (Bc.) or MSc (Mgr./Ing.).

=== Germany ===
In Germany, there are two kinds of universities: Universitäten and Fachhochschulen (which are also called University of Applied Sciences). Universitäten and Fachhochschulen – both also called Hochschulen - are legally equal, but Fachhochschulen have the reputation of being more related to practice and have no legal right to offer PhD programmes.

The BSc in Germany is equivalent to the BSc(Hons) in the United Kingdom. Many universities in German-speaking countries are changing their systems to the BA/MA system and in doing so also offering the full equivalent of a BSc.

In Germany the BA normally lasts between three and four years (six to eight semesters) and between 180 and 240 ECTS must be earned.

=== India ===
In India, Bachelor of Science (BSc/ BS) is offered by central and state universities, as well as Institutes of National Importance such as Indian Institutes of Science Education and Research (IISERs), Indian Institutes of Technology (IITs) and others. Historically a three-year graduate program, under the National Education Policy 2020 it is now a four-year program with an option to exit after three years. After completion of all four years, students are awarded the degree of Bachelor of Science (Hons./ Hons. with Research). The Bachelor of Science degree is different from Bachelor of Technology (BTech)/ Bachelor of Engineering (BE).

In certain subjects such as mathematics, statistics, geography, and psychology, many universities offer both a Bachelor of Arts (BA) and a Bachelor of Science (BSc). Typically, students can choose from different sets of minor subjects depending on which program (BA or BSc) they were admitted to. Some institutions, including the IISERs, also offer five-year Integrated BSc+MSc degrees. The Indian Institute of Science offers a four-year BS (Research) degree, which is more research-oriented with an option to continue for an extra year for a master's thesis.

Apart from IISERs, the University of Delhi (through its affiliated colleges), Banaras Hindu University and University of Hyderabad are well-known for their BSc degrees.

==== Bachelor of Science (Agriculture) ====
The B.Sc. (Honours) degree in Agriculture/Horticulture/Forestry/Food science/Sericulture is offered by the Indian Council of Agricultural Research, its constituent institutions, and central and state agricultural universities which last for four years, in which the fourth year comprises fully of All India Study tour and an industrial internship and work program namely Rural Agriculture Work Experience (RAWE).

=== Ireland ===
Commonly in Ireland, graduands are admitted to the degree of Bachelor of Science after having completed a programme in one or more of the sciences. These programmes may take different lengths of time to complete. In Ireland, the former BS was changed to BSc (Hons), which is awarded after four years. The BSc (Ord) is awarded after three years. Formerly at the University of Oxford, the degree of BSc was a postgraduate degree; this former degree, still actively granted, has since been renamed MSc.

=== United Kingdom ===
Commonly in British Commonwealth countries, graduands are admitted to the degree of Bachelor of Science after having completed a programme in one or more of the sciences. These programmes may take different lengths of time to complete.

A Bachelor of Science receives the designation BSc for an ordinary degree and BSc (Hons) for an honours degree. In England, Wales and Northern Ireland an honours degree is typically completed over a three-year period, though there are a few intensified two-year courses (with less vacation time). Bachelor's degrees (without honours) were typically completed in two years for most of the twentieth century. In Scotland, where access to university is possible after one less year of secondary education, degree courses have a foundation year making the total course length four years.

=== North America ===
In Canada, Mexico, and the United States, it is most often a four-year undergraduate degree, typically in engineering, computer science, mathematics, economics, finance, business, or the natural sciences.

There are, however, some colleges and universities, notably in the province of Quebec, that offer three-year degree programs.

== Typical completion period ==
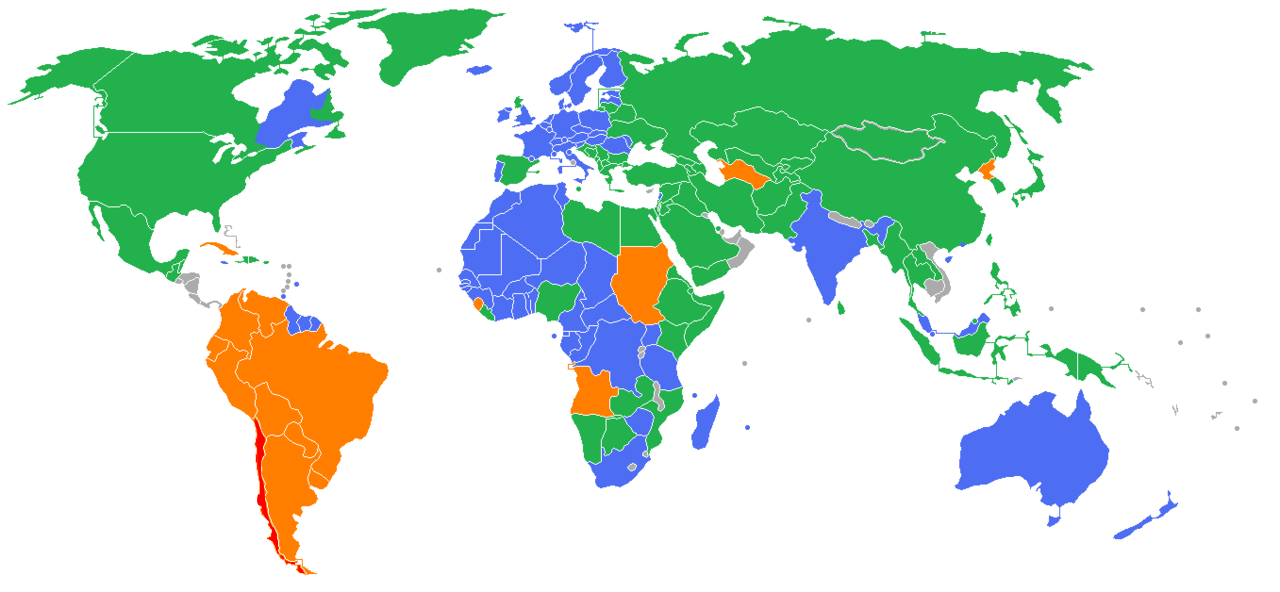
Three years Four years Five years Six years

=== Three years ===
Algeria, Australia, Austria, Barbados, Belgium, Belize, Bosnia and Herzegovina (mostly three years, sometimes four), Cameroon, Canada (specifically Quebec), Côte d'Ivoire, Croatia (mostly three years, sometimes four), Czech Republic (mostly three years, sometimes four), Denmark, England (three or four years with a one-year placement in industry), Estonia, Finland, France, Germany (mostly three years, but can be up to four years), Hungary, Iceland, India (three-year BSc in arts and pure sciences excluding engineering, Agriculture and medicine, four years BS, Bsc (hons.) Agriculture, Engineering, four years for engineering program "Bachelor of Engineering", four years for Agriculture program "Bachelor of Agriculture" and five years for medicine program "Bachelor of Medicine and Bachelor of Surgery"), Ireland (Ordinary), Israel (for most subjects), Italy, Jamaica (three or four years), Latvia (three or four years), Lebanon (three or four years, five years for Bachelor of Engineering), Malaysia, New Zealand, the Netherlands (three years for research universities, four years for universities of applied sciences), Northern Ireland, Norway, Poland, Portugal, Romania, Scotland (Ordinary), Singapore (honours degree takes 4 years), Slovakia, Slovenia, South Africa (honours degree takes 4 years), Sweden, Switzerland, Trinidad and Tobago, Uganda (mostly three years, sometimes four), United Arab Emirates, Wales, and Zimbabwe.

=== Four years ===
Afghanistan, Albania (four or five years), Armenia (four or five years), Australia (honours degree), Azerbaijan (four or five years), Bahrain, Bangladesh (four or five years), Belarus, Belize, Bosnia and Herzegovina, Brazil (four or five years), Brunei (three or four years), Bulgaria, Canada (except Quebec, four or five years), China, Cyprus, the Dominican Republic, Egypt (four or five years), Ethiopia (engineering, five years), Finland (engineering, practice in industry not included), Georgia, Ghana (three or four years), Greece (four or five years), Guatemala, Haiti (three or four years), Hong Kong (starting from 2012; three years prior to then), India (Some universities and institutes offer 4 year degrees ), Indonesia (four or five years), Iran (four or five years), Iraq, Ireland (Honours Degree), Israel (engineering degree), Japan, Jordan (four to five years), Kazakhstan, Kenya, Kuwait, Libya, Lithuania, North Macedonia (three, four or five years), Malawi (four or five years), Malta, Mexico, Montenegro (three or four years), Myanmar, Nepal (previously three, now four years), the Netherlands (three years for research universities, four years for universities of applied sciences), New Zealand (honours degree), Nigeria (four or five years), Pakistan (four or five years), the Philippines (four or five years), Romania, Russia, Saudi Arabia, Scotland (Honours Degree), Serbia (three or four years), Spain, South Africa (fourth year is elective — to obtain an Honours degree, which is normally a requirement for selection into a master's degree program), South Korea, Sri Lanka (three, four, or five (specialized) years), Taiwan, Tajikistan (four or five years), Thailand, Turkmenistan (four years), Tunisia (only a Bachelor of Science in Business Administration is available, solely awarded by Tunis Business School), Turkey, Ukraine, the United States, Uruguay (four, five, six, or seven years), Vietnam (four or five years), Yemen, and Zambia (four or five years).

=== Five years ===
Canada (except Quebec, four or five years), Cuba (five years), Greece (four or five years), Peru, Argentina, Colombia (five years), Brazil (four or five years), Mexico (four or five years), Chile (five or six years), Venezuela (five years), Egypt (four or five years), Haiti (four or five years), Iran (four or five years), the Philippines (four or five years).

Bangladesh (four or five years), Pakistan (four or five years), Indonesia (four or five years), Nigeria (four or five years), six months dedicated to SIWES (Students Industrial Work Exchange Scheme) but for most sciences and all engineering courses only. A semester for project work/thesis not excluding course work during the bachelor thesis. Excluding one year for the compulsory National Youth Service Corps (NYSC), para-military and civil service.

North Macedonia, Sierra Leone (four years dedicated to coursework), Slovenia (four or five years), Sudan (five years for BSc honours degree and four years for BSc ordinary degree), and Syria.

In Algeria, the student presents a thesis in front of a Jury at the end of the fifth year.

Some universities in Canada (such as University of British Columbia and Vancouver Island University) have most of their science and applied science students extend their degree by a year compared to other institutions.

=== Six years ===
In Chile, some undergraduate majors such as engineering and geology are designed as six-year programs. However, in practice it is not uncommon for students to complete such programs over the course of ten years, while studying full-time without leaves of absence. This is in part due to a strict grading system where the highest grade of a typical class can be as low as 60% (C-).

There are studies that suggest a direct correlation between reduced social mobility and differences unique to the Chilean higher education system.

== See also ==
- British undergraduate degree classification
- British degree abbreviations
- List of tagged degrees
- Master of Science
