= French University of Egypt =

Private university in Egypt

Coordinates: 30°09′01″N 31°36′23″E

French University of Egypt - UFE
- Université française d’Égypte الجامعة الفرنسية في مصر
- Motto: “Faites la différence”
- Established: 2002
- Location: El Shorouk, Cairo, Egypt
- Campus: El Shorouk, 40 km (25 mi) from the center of Cairo
- Language: French, English and Arabic
- Founder universities: Paris III: Sorbonne University, Haute Alsace University, Corse University and Nantes University
- Website: ufe.edu.eg

The French University of Egypt (French: Université française d’Égypte, UFE, Arabic: الجامعة الفرنسية في مصر, lit. 'the French University in Egypt') is a non-profit private university, established in 2002 at Cairo in El-Sherouk city. It is composed of three faculties: Business, Engineering, and Applied Languages. Each faculty is composed of different departments. All the diplomas offered by the university are in coordination with prestigious French universities like Paris III: Sorbonne University, the Nantes University, Haute Alsace (Mulhouse-Colmar) University and the Corse University. A convention with Paris VI University concerning the engineering school was also signed. The university is located in El-Shorouk city, 37 km (23 mi) from the center of Cairo. The university uses French (mainly), English and Arabic languages in teaching, and its graduates are able to use these three languages in any work domain related to their specialization.

== Historic events ==
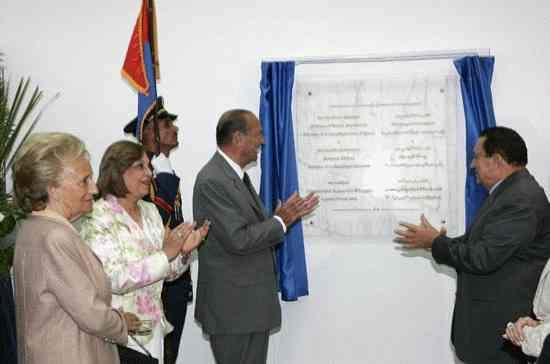
French president Jacques Chirac and Egyptian president Hosni Mubarak at the university inauguration

=== University inaugurations ===
The university was inaugurated in 2006 by president Jacques Chirac and president Hosni Mubarak.

=== Euro-Mediterranean Bio-mathematics conference ===
Held between the 26 and 28 July 2007 by the University of Savoie and Universitá di Corsica. Researchers from Europe and the Mediterranean met in Egypt to discuss bio-mathematical subjects and the implementation of mathematics in medicine to cure certain diseases.

=== International Microelectronics conference ===
The TIC department in the UFE accommodated, from the 29 to 31 December 2007, an international Microelectronics conference, in cooperation with the Canadian University of Waterloo and the Electronic Devices Society of the IEEE. The conference was under the aegis of the Ministry of Communication and Information Technology and the Ministry of Higher Education. A certain number of communications were presented on the following fields: Systems and Integrated Circuits, CAD for Microelectronics and Technology of Microphone–Nanoelectronics. The Best communications will be published in a special volume of the review “Microelectronics Journal” (Elsevier). This demonstration profited from the financial support of the companies Mentor Graphics, Si-Ware Systems, If-Vision, Newport Media, Imodelit, the National Institute of the Telecommunication and the Ministry of Communication and Information Technology. The students of the department TIC of the UFE strongly helped with the organization of this event and took part in it actively.

=== Paris 6 convention signing ===
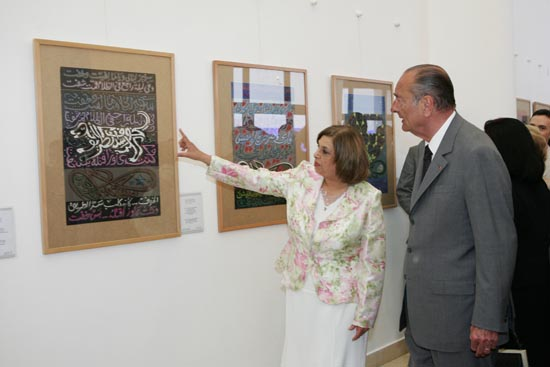
President Jacques Chirac at the UFE

On 4 November 2007 there was the signing of the convention between the University of Paris 6 and the UFE, in presence of UFE's former president Tahani Omar, Paris 6 president Jean-Charles POMEROL and the French ambassador Philippe COSTE. The signing was followed by a cocktail.

=== SIFE in the UFE ===
The UFE is the 2009 & 2010 SIFE World Champion. The university encourages its students to participate in social entrepreneurship projects that aim at reducing poverty, sustaining environment while at the same time creating economic opportunities for the underprivilidged communities. The SIFE competition is an annual competition that ranks the universities’ projects against social entrepreneurship criteria such as financial literacy, market economics, success skills, environment sustainability and entrepreneurship. Each criterion is sponsored by one or more business sponsors. For 3 consecutive years (from 2008 to 2010) and later on 2012, the SIFE UFE team has won Egypt's National Championship. Once more, it proved the authenticity of its projects winning the 2009 SIFE World Cup over universities from more than 40 countries. SIFE UFE by winning the 2010 SIFE World championship, It became the first university to ever win 2 World championships in a row.

=== Painting Exhibition ===
“The (ex)President of the French University of Egypt Tahani Omar inaugurated an artistic event at the veritable institution’s headquarters in Al-Shorouq City last week. The event hosted a miscellaneous art exhibition featuring 45 contemporary artists. West Al-Balad pop band performed many of their contemporary Arabic songs. Also some of the multi-talented students of the university who are also members of the university band enchanted the audience with absolutely delightful songs. A galaxy of dignitaries attended the event including the head of the projects at the university Violette Fayeq and a number of lecturers, professors, faculty heads and deans.” Al-Ahram Hébdo

=== CY Tech ===
In February 2023, CY Tech hosted the President of the French University in Egypt during their meeting with Cergy Paris University counterpart regarding institutional collaboration between the two educational bodies.

== Campus ==
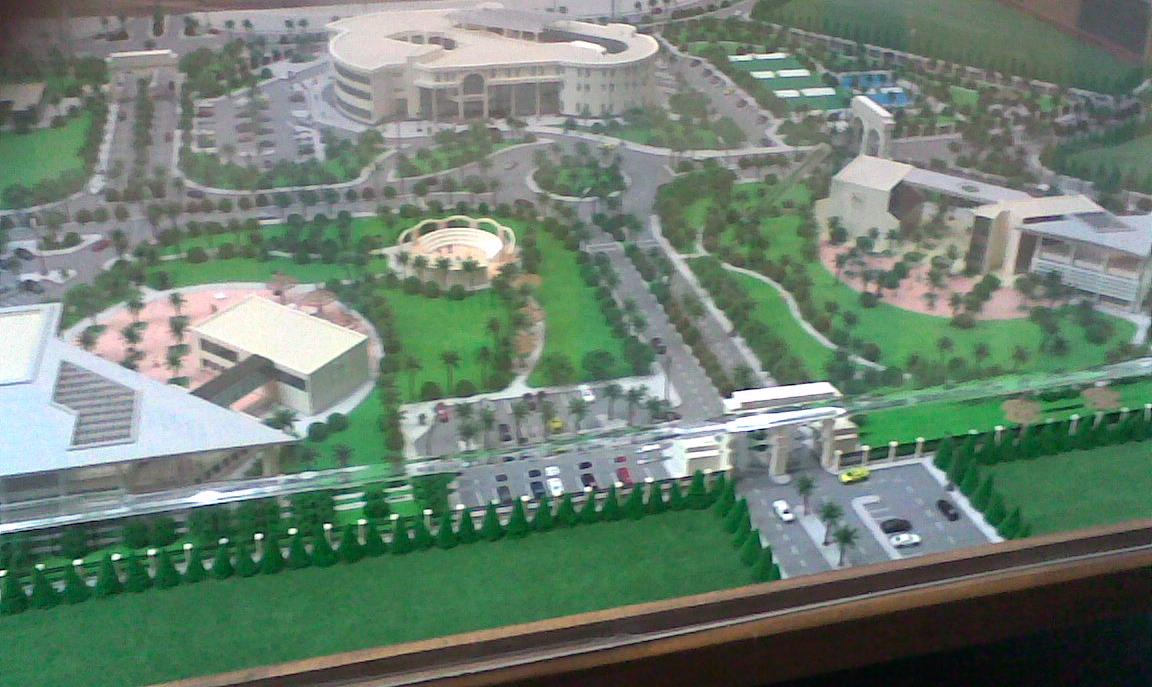
A view of the undergraduate campus

=== Main campus ===
Only three faculties in the university are yet opened. The campus construction will continue in mid-2009 and the whole campus is expected to be finished after two years time. the photo besides is only an imaginary design & the real campus is only one building with three floors and no other constructions are added until now (needs update)

=== Post-graduate campus (citation needed) ===
The university has another campus in El-Mohandesseen that is dedicated to post-graduate studies as well as extracurricular courses. (citation needed)

=== New campus (under construction, almost done) ===
A new campus is being built, and it has been mentioned that it will start operating at the start of 2026. The new campus is designed by Jakob+Macfarlane and is supposed to be an environmentally friendly and advanced campus featuring super computers and wide green spaces.

== Advantages ==
=== Three teaching languages ===
French (a language of culture and knowledge that creates bridges with French speaking countries), English (a globalization language) and Arabic (in order to work in Egypt and Arab countries). The student will learn how to use those three languages professionally at the work place during his 4 years of studies. Notice that these three languages are 3 of the 6 International Languages defined by the United Nations (English, Spanish, Chinese, French, Arabic and Russian), which makes them wanted anywhere in the world.

=== Double Diplomas ===
An Egyptian and a French/European one (University of Paris III: Sorbonne, University of Nantes). Faculty of engineering: Masters in the “PEC” and “TIC” departments which could be delivered by the Haute-Alsace University, the Corse University or Paris 6 University. L’UFE is the only university in Egypt that delivers a foreign diploma without its students being obligated to travel outside Egypt to get the foreign diploma (still, students can go continue their studies in France if they want.)

=== French systems and programs ===
The French University of Egypt has an agreement with the universities of Paris VI (1st scientific university in France), Paris III: Sorbonne, Nantes and Corse that all academic programs will be supervised and approved by these universities.

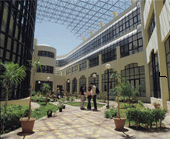
A look inside the campus

And that these universities will send its professors to teach at the UFE as well as providing the UFE with technical assistance.

Like many other Egyptian private Universities, the UFE has joint curricula with their French counterparts.

Engineering students at the UFE can now prepare their master's degree from Paris VI University. Paris VI is the best university in France, and rated 38th by the Academic Ranking for World Universities organization. Today, no students from any other private university in Egypt can prepare the Master or the Doctorate degrees from any university included in the top 200 World universities, but the UFE students.

== Faculties ==
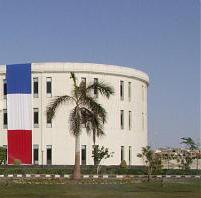
A partial frontal view of the campus

- Faculty of Applied Languages

The department has the following specializations:

    - Electronics & Communication
    - Architecture and Design of Integrated Circuits
    - Networks and Computer Systems
    - Microwave, Electromagnetism and Optoelectronics
  - Production, energy and automatic control department (PEC)

The department covers all the domains of Mechanical Engineering & Fiber Science.

  - Architecture Department

== School of Engineering ==
=== Introduction ===
Today the faculty contains 8 Engineering specializations. The UFE Engineering faculty is the only Engineering faculty in Egypt to have the two specializations “Microwave, Electromagnetism & Optoelectronics” and the Architecture and Design of “Integrated Circuits”.

=== Facilities ===
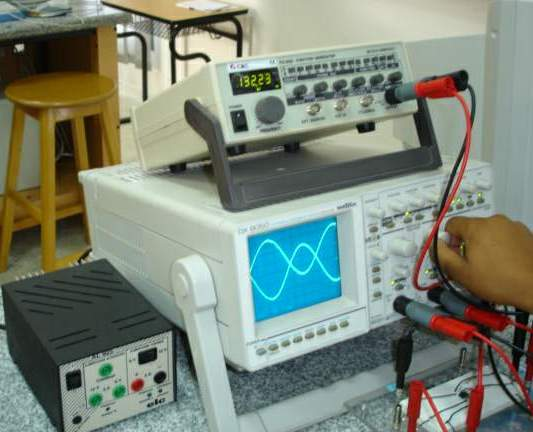

- Electricity and Magnetism lab
- Optics & LASER lab
- Microwaves and Antennas lab
- Optoelectronics lab
- Automatism lab
- Electronics & Communication lab
- Backbone Networks lab
- Data Transferring lab

- Computer labs
- Architecture and Design of Integrated Circuits informatics lab
- Numerical Analysis lab
- Materials lab
- Automatic Control lab
- Heat Transfer & Fluid Mechanic lab
- Vibrations lab
- Chemistry lab
- Off-campus access to the Ministry of Military Production labs

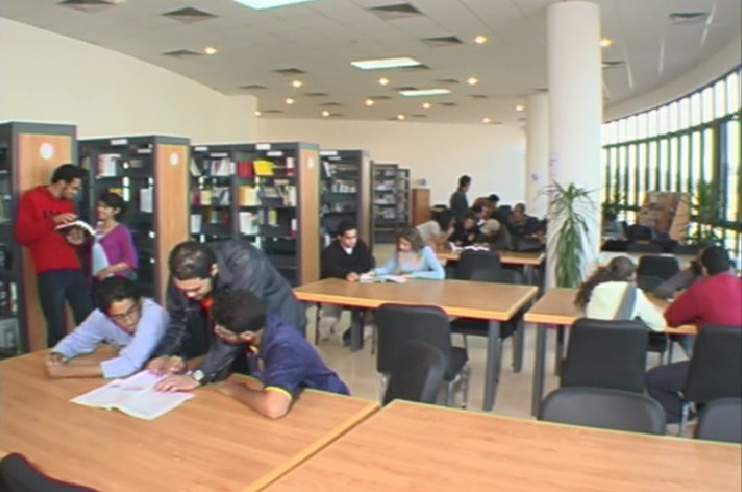

- Library
- Wi-Fi (Internet access anywhere in the campus)
- Electronics workshop
- Production Technology workshop
- Technical Drawing Hall
- Conference room (which at the moment presents lectures from Paris VI University)
- Online postgraduate courses in cooperation with the Massachusetts Institute of Technology, the Rice University and the Carnegie Mellon University.

=== Staff ===
As training the future teachers is a priority at the UFE, the UFE sends professors to do postgraduate studies in France. List of recent professors sent to France:

- Ahmed Ali, works at the LAAS laboratory at Toulouse university. He does doctoral studies in the field of electromagnetism, more specifically in the domain of antennas.
- Mootaz Allam, who is currently making researches at the Informatics laboratory at Paris 6 university. The domain of research is the analog electronics.
- Ahmed Gamal, currently making postgraduate studies at the ENSPS (École Nationale Supérieure de Physique de Stasbourg) laboratory in the field of signals treatment.

=== Convention with the University of Savoie ===
The students of the PEC department at the faculty of engineering will benefit from a new course on renewed energy. This course will be offered by the polytechnic school of Savoie University within the framework of a partnership in prospect.

Many students will have the opportunity to travel to Savoie and prepare a master's degree and work in the field of research at the University of Savoie.

== Business Faculty ==
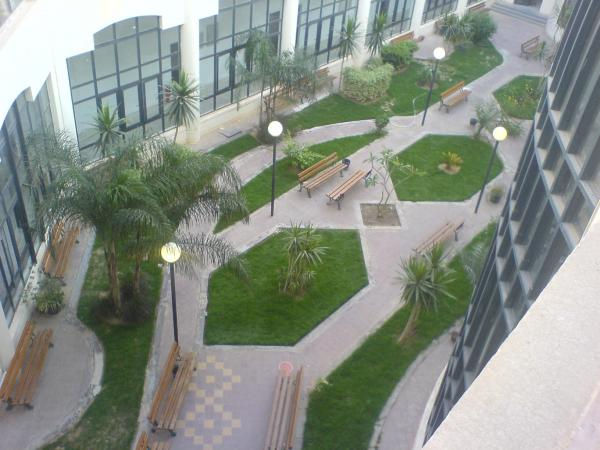
the single inside-garden

The only university in Egypt harmonically coupling the study of management and informatics.

=== Staff ===
- Hany Nasr El-Din was invited to assist in the supports of the finals studies for the master's degree.
- Associate Pr. Asmaa Al-Sharif, traveled to Rennes for a doctoral week. After that, to Nantes University to participate in a conference at the “Maison des Sciences Humaines”. She co-presented a communication with Associate Pr. Eve Lamendour at the Nantes University.
- Lecturer Myriam RAYMOND, has been invited to teach in Université de Nantes a curriculum in International Economics & Business. She moreover participated with several papers both locally and internationally. Her research interests focus on the outsourced banking operations.

=== Visitors ===
This is a list of UFE visitor professors (out-dated list):

- Pr. Alain VAILLY, from Nantes University, will give lectures in Modeling.
- Pr. Vélina SLAVOVA, from Bulgare University, will teach Introduction to the Bases of Information.
- Pr. Marie CATALO and Noel BARBU, from Nantes University.
- Pr. Eve LAMENDOUR, from Nantes University, to give lectures in Marketing.
- Pr. Pascale COUPARD, associated with Nantes University, to teach Management Risks for students in the 4th year in the Management department.

== Applied Languages Faculty ==
=== Introduction ===
The Applied Languages faculty at the UFE is in cooperation and under the supervision of the Paris III: Sorbonne University. The Sorbonne University is one of the top 5 universities in the world.

== Research ==
=== CIDRE ===

Created in April 2004, the International Center of Research, Development and Cooperation (CIDRE) has the role to allow to the UFE to become a national and international development pole. This center has as a priority to be in close contact with the world of the company, the local or international institutions concerned with research and with the various concerned organizations of the development.

The action of the CIDRE is spread on three axes:

==== The research ====
The CIDRE has as a principal role to undertake and organize research within the UFE. It must found a public image of the university as an establishment dedicated to research (participation in international conferences and publications in reviews specialized). To conclude from the agreements from Research and Development (R&D) with the companies leaders and to undertake activities of consulting form part of the principal concerns of the CIDRE.

==== The continued formation ====
To work out continuous training schemes in relation to the needs for the market east another priority of the CIDRE. It must set up a system of formation open to all, always with the concern of meeting the specific needs for the companies.

==== Outside relations ====
The CIDRE establishes bonds of co-operation with international organizations like UNESCO, the European Community, the Agency of the Francophonie... It develops projects of co-operation with the establishments concerned (Ministries for Industry and Oil).

=== Cooperation agreements ===
==== UNESCO ====
The co-operation with UNESCO is a pilot project dedicated to the use of modern technologies of teaching in the Egyptian, Arab and African universities. The agreement signed by the CIDER on October 8, 2003, allows inter alia in common developing courses on line with Massachusetts Institute of Technology, Carnegie Mellon University and Rice University. To make it possible the UFE to produce a modern center of course online like adapting and implementing a system of management of teaching are other objectives of this agreement.

==== Ministry of Industry ====
A convention was signed on June 22, 2004, between the UFE and the Ministry for Industry. Under the terms of this convention, the Ministry will take part with the UFE, in the form of committee of follow-up, with the development of the training schemes, like with obtaining their financing. These programs are intended for executives of the private sector working in the fields of import/export, of the management of quality and the leadership

==== Ministry of Petrol ====
A convention was signed between the UFE and the Ministry for Oil 5 the Mars 2005. Under the terms of this convention, the Ministry offers to the French University of Egypt a financial assistance intended for the equipment of the laboratories, accommodates the students of three faculties in training courses and grants purses to best of them all while beginning to offer stations in the oil sector to them. As for the UFE, it takes part with the assistance of its partners, with the effort engaged by the Ministry for Oil for the improvement of the performances of the executives working in the oil sector, and this, through technical trainings specialized and consultations on request.

=== Online courses ===
These courses were developed within the framework of a project with the MIT and the UNESCO:

- Thermodynamics
- Electric and electronic circuits
- Solid state mechanics
- Electric materials

== UFE Partners ==
- Paris III: Sorbonne University
- Paris VI University
- Haute Alsace University
- Corse University
- Nantes University
- Centre de Recherche, Développement et Coopération Internationale
- Centre Français de Culture et de Coopération
- Ambassade de France en République Arabe d’Égypte
- Club d’Affaires Franco-Égyptien

The university also has collaborations with:

- UNESCO
- Massachusetts Institute of Technology
- Carnegie Mellon University
- Rice University
- University of Savoie
