= SIFE UFE =

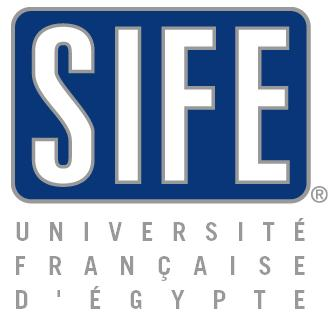
- Formation: November 2006
- Type: University activity
- Headquarters: French University of Egypt, Shorouk, Cairo
- Members: 121
- Official language: English, Egyptian Arabic, African French
- President: David
- Parent organization: (United States) SIFE Worldwide
- Website: www.sife-ufe.org

SIFE UFE (Students In Free Enterprise Université Française d'Egypte) is the name for the SIFE team at the French University of Egypt (UFE). It works with Egyptian leaders in business and the Ministry of Education to make a difference in its communities while developing the skills to become socially responsible business leaders.

== Projects ==
Among the projects SIFE UFE presented in the national and World Cup competitions:

=== El-Warraq Island community ===
- MicroBusiness
- El-Warraq Women Development Program
  - WIFE (Women In Free Entreprise)
  - Sew Far Sew Good
  - Loom Weaving project
- Don Bosco
- Sailing Hope
- BioLife Program
  - Phase 1: Biogas Units
  - BioBakery
- Re-Warraq
- The Core
- Mix-it-All

=== El-Azbakeya community ===
- AzaBook
- Nabi Daniel (a similar program in Alexandria)

=== El-Bahariya Oasis community ===
- El-Wahat project

=== El-Zabbaleen community ===
- Few2C (Food Entrapped Waste 'to' Compost)

=== El-Galatma Village community ===
- Purigation

=== Egyptian general issues ===
- Rice Straw project

=== El-Mayyana Village community ===
- Purigation

=== El-Manzala lake community ===
- Aqua Farming

| Preceded by Memorial University, Canada (2008) | SIFE World Cup Champion; 2009 - 2010 | Succeeded by University of Regensburg, Germany (2011) |
| Preceded by Chinhoyi University of Technology, Zimbabwe (2011) | SIFE World Cup First Runner-Up; 2012 | Succeeded by The University of Southampton, United Kingdom (2013) |
| Preceded by Misr International University (2006-2007) Cairo University (2011) | SIFE National Champion of Egypt; 2008 - 2009 - 2010 2012 | Succeeded by Cairo University (2011) British University in Egypt (2013) |
| Preceded by Cairo University (2010) Cairo University (2013) | SIFE First Runner-Up of Egypt; 2011 - 2013 | Succeeded by Cairo University (2012) incumbent |
