= List of TAYO Awards winners =

The following is a list of all awardees of the Ten Accomplished Youth Organizations (TAYO) Awards from 2003 to 2020.

== Awardees ==
Ten Accomplished Youth Organizations (TAYO) Awardees
| Year | Awardees | Finalists | Notes |
|---|---|---|---|
| 2003 | 1. Ateneo Debate Society; 2. BPI-Save Mother Earth Club; 3. Hundred Islands Cycling Club; 4. Kabataang Gabay sa Positibong Pamumuhay - Pag-asa Youth Association of the Philippines; 5. Kapansan ay Akibat sa Kaunlaran ng Bayan (KAAKBAY); 6. MyZoo Volunteer Group Foundation; 7. Rodeo Club of the Philippines-Benguet State University; 8. Rotaract of Muntinlupa Peacemaker Youth Club; 9. Students' Actions Vital to the Environment and Mother Earth (SAVE ME); 10. UP Industrial Engineering Club | 1. Loyola Mountaineers; 2. Dipolog Youth for Progress, Right Moves; 3. Emmanuel Baja Chapter - Order of DeMolay; 4. Guided and Unified Interaction for the Development of Children; 5. Hiliugyon Sang Pamatan-on (HAYAP) - Pag-asa Youth Association of the Philippines; 6. Naga Foundation College Cultural Arts Center; 7. Unibersidad de Santa Isabel Nursing Students' Association; 8. Vintar 4H Club; 9. Visayan Village Green Brigade; 10. Youth Policy Forum | |
| 2004 | 1. De La Salle University Student Council; 2. GenRev Student Network; 3. Tuklas Katutubo; 4. Students' Association of Management Accountants; 5. Sugbuanong Pundok Aron Sugpuon ng Child Abuse (SUPACA); 6. Core, Inc.; 7. Philippine Rescue 2000; 8. Sta. Ana National High School Musical Dramatics Society; 9. Tingog sa Kasanag (TISAKA); 10. Watershed Management Youth Council | 1. Benguet State University Interdependent Study Organization of Students; 2. Philippine Rural Reconstruction Youth Association; 3. Siquijor State College Active Beginners' Club; 4. University of Northeastern Philippines University Student Government; 5. University of the Philippines Los Banos Chemical Society; 6. Mu Sigma Phi, University of the Philippines Manila; 7. Task Force Arki, University of the Philippines Diliman; 8. D'Catalyst Club; 9. Foundation University Peer Counselors' Circle; 10. Jordan Youth Movement | |
| 2005 | 1. KAGABAY - Barangay 20, Tondo Manila, K! AKTIBO; 2. Benguet State University - Development Communication Society, Stories of Alapu; 3. Young Artists' Fellowship for the Environment (YAFE), Enviro-Art Workshop; 4. Sining Bulakenyo-Pangkat Mananayaw, Promotion of folk dance for national identity and nation-building 5. UP Visayas Junior Philippine Institute of Accountants, We Make Accounting Work; 6. West Visayas State University - Political Science Students' Organization, Adopt-Alimodias Project; 7. SAVE Mindanao Volunteers, Inc., From Wetland to Upland Literacy Program; 8. Mindanao Polytechnic State College Mathematics Society, Math Readiness Summer Course; 9. Beehive 4-H Club, Agro-Industry Enterprise; 10. Kilusan Para sa Kalikasan, Oplan Sagip Batang Pier | 1. Tanghalang Lepanto; 2. Teatro Kabataan sa Southern Leyte; 3. Mu Sigma Phi Sorority; 4. Mlang Youth Organization; 5. UP Diliman Special Education Council; 6. San Beda Dragon Boat Rowing Society; 7. University of the Cordilleras Supreme Student Government; 8. Gil S. Montilla NHS YECS-LCAO; 9. Anak ng Tribo; 10. Young Catholic Movement | |
| 2006 | 1. Dapitan Fire and Rescue Volunteers; 2. Emmanuel Baja Chapter, Order of DeMolay; 3. Guiguinto, Bulacan Scholars Association; 4. Alay Ni Ignacio; 5. KAPINSANKANA; 6. KYTHE Ateneo; 7. SWU Nursing Student Body Organization; 8. Rotaract Club of Bacolod East; 9. Rotaract Club of Tagum, North-Um Tagum Chapter; 10. United Isulan Youth for Progress | 1. Nautical Science Student Council (Cagayan de Oro); 2. Iloilo Federation of Junior Executives; 3. Institute of Integrated Electrical Engineerings of the Philippines, Inc. Philippine University Chapter; 4. Mabini Colleges - College of Commerce and Accountancy Central Council; 5. Marilao Nationalist Youth; 6. Medical Missions, Inc.; 7. The Philippine Foundation of Christ's Youth in Action, Inc.; 8. University of San Agustin Sigma Chi Fraternity and Mu Sigma Phi Sorority; 9. Watershed Management Youth Council; 10. Youth Advocators Productive Integrated Service | |
| 2007 | 1. Books and Information Technology Society (BITS); 2. Inclusive Youth Center; 3. Jolo Emergency Rescue Network; 4. Kapansanan ay Akiabt sa Kaunlaran ng Bayan (KAAKBAY); 5. Kabayan Cultural Organization for Supporting, Developing, and Empowering the Youth (KOSDEY); 6. Silak sa Kauswagan Youth Organization (SAKAYAN); 7. Samahan ng Maliit na Mangingisda ng Kabataang Baltak (SMM KaBaltak); 8. UP High School Cebu Student Council; 9. UP Sandigan; 10. Volunteers for Integrated Public Service (VIPS) | | |
| 2008 | 1. 505 DREAM; 2. Dynamic Teen Company; 3. Jose Rizal University Computer Society; 4. Kabataang Gabay sa Positibong Pamumuhay (KGPP) Western Visayas; 5. Lamlifew 4-H Club; 6. Mu Sigma Phi Sorority; 7. Xavier University School of Business and Management Student Council; 8. Society of Scholars and Grantees; 9. UP Cebu SEALNet Entrepreneurs Club; 10. Youth Advocates Through Theater Arts | 1. AKKAP UP Manila; 2. Ateneo Debate Society; 3. Bitagurean 4-H Club; 4. Katin-Aran Youth Association; 5. SHELTER; 6. UP Sibol (UPLB); 7. Ateneo TUGON; 8. UNP CSC; 9. WARAYA; 10. Yapis | |
| 2009 | 1. Guesset National High School Science Club; 2. Pag-asa Youth Association of the Philippines - Pamplona Chapter; 3. Sangguniang Kabataan - Passi City Federation; 4. Mu Sigma Phi Sorority; 5. Batis - Youth Organization that Gives Hope and Inspiration (YOGHI); 6. El Consejo Atenista; 7. Samahan ng Maliliit na Mangingisda ng Kabataang BALTAK; 8. Muntinlupa Junior Rescue Team; 9. Iloilo Prima Galaw Productions; 10. Earnest Support for Underprivileged Children Charity Assistance Association, Inc. | 1. Pag-asa Youth Association - Talisay City Chapter; 2. Tsinelas Group of Campus Volunteers; 3. Kulasihan Young Achievers, Inc.; 4. Students in Free Enterprise - Mindanao State University, General Santos; 5. University of the Philippines Junior Philippine Institute of Accountants; 6. Dire Husi Initiative Organization; 7. Pongoleel 4-H Club; 8. Special Education Students' Association (SPEDSA); 9. Students in Free Enterprise - University of Luzon; 10. Students in Free Enterprise - St. Paul University Quezon City | |
| 2010 | 1. Alay ni Ignacio, ADMU; 2. Brotherhood for Peace; 3. Education Revolution Movement; 4. Link.Exe, West Visayas State University; 5. Mandaya Tribal Youth Organization; 6. Pag-asa Youth Association - Talisay City Chapter; 7. Pagaypay 4-H Club; 8. Philippine Stagers Foundation; 9. Pochon Maanichar Centennial Batch Association, Inc.; 10. PRO Drop-out Reduction Program | 1. Association of Locally Empowered Youth; 2. Sanggunian ng mga Mag-aaral ng mga Paaralang Loyol ng Ateneo de Manila, Ateneo Residents' Association, Council of Organizations of the Ateneo; 3. Catuguing Palayamanan 4-H Working Youth Club; 4. Nursing Central Board of Students, UST; 5. Palawan Conservation Corps; 6. Youth Solidarity for Peace; 7. Student Nurses Association of the Philippines - West Visayas State University Chapter; 8. Terrestrial and Aquatic Restorations by Students Immersed in Environmental Reforms; 9. Watershed Management Youth Council; 10. Young Educators of Mapulang Lupa | |
| 2011 | 1. Aklan Catholic College Junior Philippine Institute of Accountants (ACCJPIA); 2. Alyansa ng mga Kristyanong Mag-aaral - Responsible Nga Baliktan Han Mga Kabataan (AKMA-RESBAK); 3. Association of Locally Empowered Youth in Northern Mindanao; 4. AUL-STAGE (Sama-samang Tinig ng mga Aktor na Gumagalaw sa Entablado); 5. Indak Kabataan Youth Organization; 6. Industrial Engineering Council of CIT University; 7. Linangan sa Imahen, Retorika, at Anyo (LIRA); 8. Youth Solidarity for Peace; 9. Young Mindanawans Peace Builders; 10. University of the Cordilleras - Hapiyoh Mi Cultural Group | 1. Abellana National School Rescue Group, Inc.; 2. Ateneo Special Education Society (SPEED); 3. HAYAG Youth Organization, Inc.; 4. Alliance of Young Nurse Leaders and Advocates International, Inc.; 5. KAIROS, UPLB; 6. MACO Youth for Peace; 7. Philippine Junior Jaycees Inc. Noveleta Kalero; 8. The Mountain Collegian; 9. UP Omega Alpha Fraternity and UP Omega Alpha Sorority; 10. UP Junior Marketing Association | |
| 2012 | 1. Angat Kabataan; 2. CBA-KALIPUNAN and Marketing Junior Executives; 3. Cebuano Youth Ambassadors; 4. DIRE-HUSI Initiatives; 5. I Can Make A Difference, Inc.; 6. De La Salle Debate Society; 7. Monteverde 4-H Club, Inc.; 8. One Million Lights Philippines; 9. Ramon Magsaysay Technological University - Electrical Engineering Society; 10. University of Luzon Students in Free Enterprise | 1. Development Communication Society of Benguet State University; 2. English Society; 3. HAYAG Youth Organization; 4. John B. Lacson Foundation Maritime University - Community Extension Service Society; 5. KYTHE Ateneo; 6. Mu Sigma Phi Sorority; 7. Phi Kappa Mu Fraternity; 8. Philippine Institute of Civil Engineers; 9. Sultan Kudarat State University - Students in Free Enterprise; 10. TINGUG-CDO | |
| 2013 | 1. ALEY-NM; 2. Hayag Youth Organization; 3. Gualandi Volunteer Service Providers, Inc.; 4. Tulong sa Kapwa Kapatid; 5. Kawil Tours; 6. Tanay Mountaineers; 7. TC Youth Lab Cooperative; 8. United Architects of the Philippines-Student Auxiliary; 9. USC Pathways; 10. Volunteer Service Provider | 1. Association of Filipino Forestry Students of the University of the Philippines- Los Baños; 2. Ateneo Sarong Bangui Junior; 3. Love Yourself Inc.; 4. MAESTRO Club; 5. Medical Missions Inc.; 6. Phi Kappa Mu; 7. Rapid Inc.; 8. Team BUNDOL; 9. Watershed Management Youth Council; 10. Upsilon Sigma Phi | |
| 2014 | | | |
| 2015 | 1. Phi Lambda Delta Sorority; 2. Kanlungan Pilipinas Movement; 3. Rescue Assistance Peacekeeping Intelligence Detail (RAPID) and Cauayan City National High School – Red Cross Youth and Junior Rescue Team; 4. Katipunan ng mga Kabataang Santiagueňo; 5. ACCESS-PYLP Alumni Association; 6. Move This World-Pilipinas; 7. Youth for Environment in School Organization; 8. Indigenous Youth Servant Leaders Association of the Philippines; 9. University of San Agustin Little Theater | | |
| 2016 | 1. Law Advocacy and Community Enrichment, University of San Carlos; 2. Tanay Mountaineers; 3. Kanlaon Theater Guild; 4. Keep Hope Alive; 5. Bayugan National Comprehensive High School in Agusan del Sur; 6. Tobog Youth Organization of Albay; 7. UP Alchemes (Academic League of Chemical Engineering Student); 8. I am M.A.D (Making a Difference), Inc.; 9. Environment and Climate Change Research Institute of De La Salle Araneta University; 10. Youth Sports Advocacy | | |
| 2017 | 1. Virtualahan, Inc.; 2. UP Genetic Researchers and Agricultural Innovators Society (UP GRAINS); 3. UP Industrial Engineering Club; 4. HiGi Energy; 5. Food Rescue ASEAN; 6. Modern Nanays of Mindanao Inc.; 7. Team Dugong Bughaw; 8. Guiguinto Scholars Association; 9. Ingat Kapandayan Artist Center; 10. Voice of Chameleon's Children; 11. Youth for a Livable Cebu | 1. Enactus UPLB, Tagani (formerly Amiga Philippines); 2. Edukasyon.ph; 3. iCare - Commission on Youth; 4. UPLB Genetics Society; 5. One Calinog Organization Inc.; 6. UP Circuit; 7. Red Cross Youth Licomco; 8. Project Kaluguran; 9. CIT Industrial Engineering Council; 10. Teatro de Sta. Luisa | |
| 2018 | 1. AQILAH (Marawi City); 2. Association of Young Environmental Journalists (Dumaguete City); 3. Center for Sustainability Philippines, Inc. (Puerto Princesa City); 4. Cuartero National High School Taliamba Ensemble; 5. FLMIS YES – O (Iligan City); 6. MIMAROPA Young Leaders (Oriental Mindoro); 7. Philippine Accessible Disability Services, Inc. (Lapu-Lapu City); 8. Team BakUNAWA (Iloilo City); 9. Tuklas Katutubo – Upper Lumabat Chapter; 10. Sun Crew (Siargao) | | |
| 2019 | 1. Buenlag National Highschool 4H Bahay Kubo - Calasiao, Pangasinan; 2. Kilusan ng Kabataan Para sa Kalikasan - Bongao, Tawi-Tawi; 3. Junior Bedan Law Circle - Mendiola, Manila; 4. Peace Crops - Cagayan de Oro City, Misamis Occidental; 5. Quirinian Youth in Action - Quirino, Isabela; 6. Sacred Heart School Ateneo de Cebu Leaders’ Council - Mandaue City, Cebu; 7. Sugpat - Zamboanga City, Zamboanga del Sur; 8. Super Lumba - Marawi City, Lanao del Sur; 9. UP Bike Share - Diliman, Quezon City; 10. Youth for Mental Health Coalition - Sampaloc, Manila | 1. Peace Creed - Aleosan North Cotabato; 2. Colonia Divina Integrated School - Supreme Student Government - Sapay City, Negros Occidental; 3. Fine Arts Major Organization - General Luna, Iloilo City; 4. Industrial Engineering Council - Cebu City; 5. Order of Ascelpius - Iloilo City; 6. Project Saysay - Quezon City; 7. Streets to Schools - Espana, Manila; 8. Daluhay Daloy ng Buhay - Baler, Aurora; 9. Pambayang Pederason ng Sangguniang Kabataan - San Agustin, Isabela; 10. SK Carangag - San Andres, Catanduanes | |
| 2020 | 1. The EstrawngHeroes - Tigbauan, Iloilo; 2. Federation of the Deaf Cavite Province - Kawit, Cavite; 3. AHA! Learning Center - Makati City; 4. #MentalHealthPH - Quezon City; 5. Supreme Student Government Action Force - Cotabato City, Maguindanao; 6. Super Readers Squad - Angeles, Pampanga; 7. Millennials PH - Cagayan de Oro, Misamis Oriental; 8. GoodGov PH - Quezon City; 9. 3H Initiative – Humans Helping Humans - Bulalacao, Oriental Mindoro; 10. Mga Tala at Tula - Candaba, Pampanga | 1. TabangPH from Baybay, Leyte; 2. Tabang Sikad from Cagayan de Oro, Misamis Oriental; 3. The Happy Cat - Cantilan, Surigado del Sur; 4. Order of Asclepius - Lapaz, Iloilo; 5. Pantawid COVID Project - Mandaluyong City; 6. Project Kalibo - Kalibo, Aklan; 7. Red Cross Youth Negros Occidental - Bacolod, Negros Occidental; 8. Streets to Schools - Manila City; 9. Andam Higala - Misamis Oriental; 10. Bayanihan Para sa Magsasaka - Kawit, Cavite | |
| 2021 | 1. FHMoms - South Signal Village, Taguig City; 2. Kristiano-Islam Peace Library Inc. - Holy Spirit, Quezon City; 3. Tabang Sikad - Cagayan de Oro City, Misamis Oriental; 4. Farm Box - Calaca, Batangas; 5. Kabasalan National High School YES-O - Kabasalan, Zamboanga Sibugay; 6. San Agustin Golden Eagle Esports - General Luna, Iloilo City; 7. Sulong! Philippines - Ugong, Pasig City; 8. Alliance of Public Health Advocates - San Pablo City, Laguna; 9. Project SMILE and TheraWee - Cainta, Rizal; 10. Mindanao Pride - Cagayan de Oro City, Misamis Oriental | 1. Andam Higala - Cagayan de Oro City, Misamis Oriental; 2. Empowering Advocates for Sustainable Environment - San Francisco, Agusal del Sur; 3. For our Farmers PH, Inc. - San Carlos, Pangasinan; 4. Hope Builders Organization Negros Island Inc. - Himamaylan City, Negros Occidental; 5. Innovations for Community Health - Malamig, Mandaluyong City; 6. I-SAVED - Solana, Cagayan; 7. Light of Hope PH - Mandaue City, Cebu; 8. Makakaya Organization - Kalibo, Aklan; 9. The Street Classroom - Mogpog, Marinduque; 10. USLS College of Education Student Council - Bacolod City, Negros Occidental | |
| 2022 | 1. Albay Young Farmers Organization; 2. Open Arms Organization; 3. Pinabuhay Sa Tao Ang Kwento At Sining (PINATAKASI); 4. Project Teatro Para sa Aktibong Layunin at Adhikain (TALA) Organization; 5. Leader’s Council (Sacred Heart of School – Ateneo de Cebu Scouting Unit); 6. Youth Empowering Youth Initiative, Inc.; 7. Iligan Safe Space; 8. Shafaat Agriculture Cooperative – Mushroom for Change; 9. Sangguniang Kabataan ng Barangay Talomo River; 10. The BAKA | | |
