= El Mourouj =

Town in Tunisia

- Commune and town
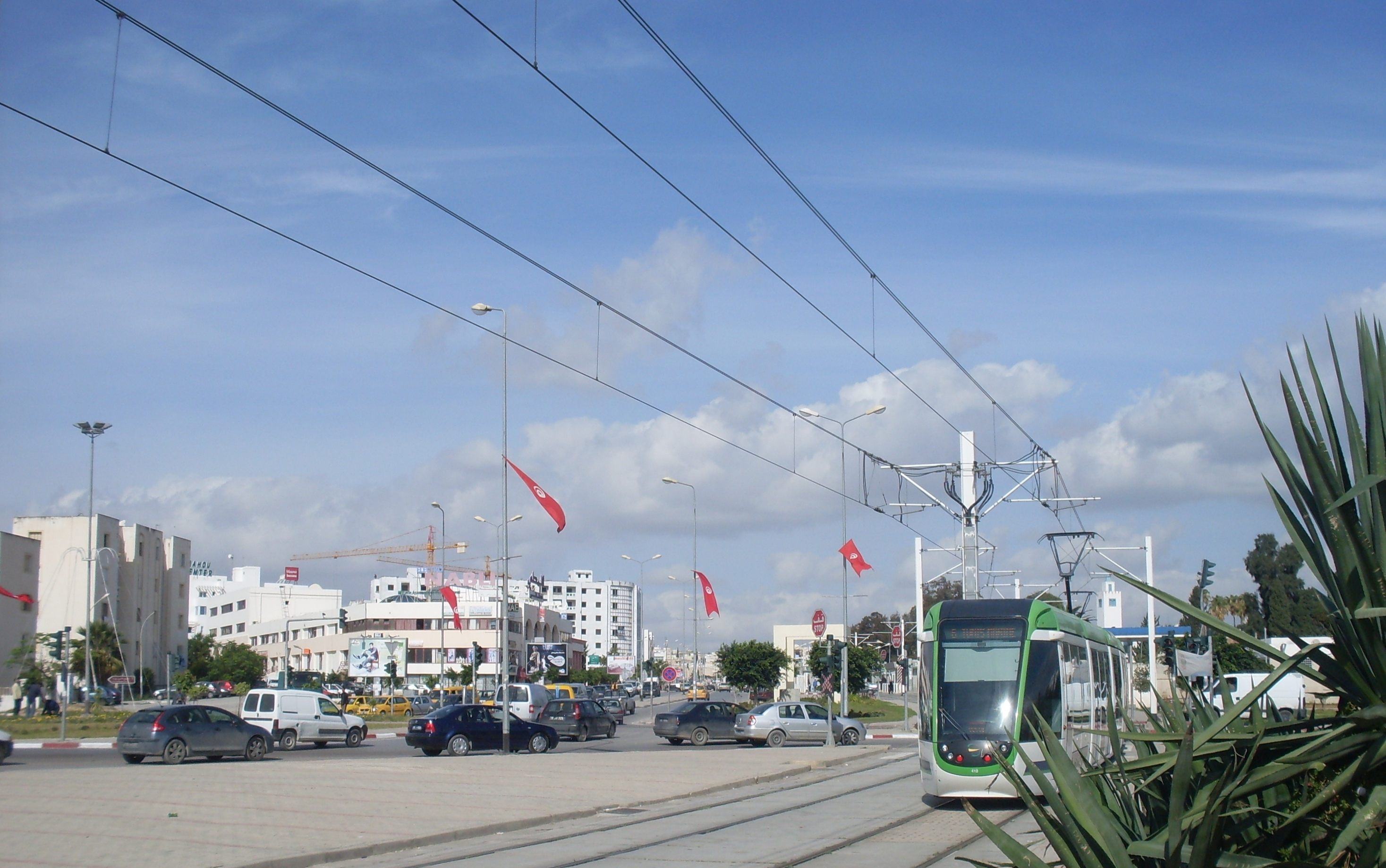
- View of Mourouj 1

- Seal

- Location within Tunisia
- Coordinates: 36°40′48″N 10°09′36″E
- Country: Tunisia
- Governorate: Ben Arous Governorate

Area
  - Total: 8.3 sq mi (21.5 km^{2})

Population (2022)
  - Total: 120,732
- Time zone: UTC+1 (CET)

El Mourouj (Arabic: المروج, romanized: el-Murūj) is a town and commune in the southern suburbs of Tunis in the Ben Arous Governorate, Tunisia. It became a commune in 1991. It has 120,732 inhabitants as of 2022, compared to 81,986 in 2004, making it the most populous commune in the Ben Arous Governorate. It is the seat of El Mourouj Delegation. The delegation, divided into five districts (numbered 1, 3, 4, 5 and 6), has a main axis; the Avenue des Martyrs, which divides it into two parts from north to south. Exceptionally, El Mourouj 2 is part of Tunis Governorate.

The town was built in the 1980s to absorb and organize the growth of population, it had been planned since 1977 and intended to accommodate 130,000 inhabitants. The delegation was created on May 31, 1991.

== Location ==
Located a few kilometers from Tunis, between Ben Arous and Sebkha Séjoumi, it is part of Greater Tunis.

The area of the delegation, covering an area of 21.5 km², is bounded by the A1 motorway to the east, National Road 3 and the governorate of Tunis to the north, Regional Road 39 to the southeast, and Fouchana to the southwest.

== Economy ==
El Mourouj Delegation is home to the country's largest wholesale market, known as Bir el-Kassaa Wholesale Market (French: Marché Bir Kassaâ).

Over fifty factories and companies occupy the industrial zone of Bir el-Kassaa.

== Education ==
El Mourouj has 19 primary schools, including 17 public and two private schools, eight middle schools, of which two are private, and seven high schools, of which two are private. There is also a youth center and a university campus.

Tunis Business School, founded in 2010, is the first public English-language business school in Tunisia. The school follows an American business curriculum and is under the supervision of the Tunis University. It covers an area of 2.4 hectares, with 17,000 square meters of built space. Originally, the Faculty of Economics and Management at Tunis University - El Manar was scheduled to open its new site in El Mourouj to replace its former campus in El Manar by the start of the 2010-11 academic year.

== Transport ==
=== Light rail ===
A metro line, connecting El Mourouj to Tunis and consisting of 16 stations, was inaugurated on November 12, 2008, after three years of construction. A delay was caused by land disputes resulting from expropriation for public utility purposes.

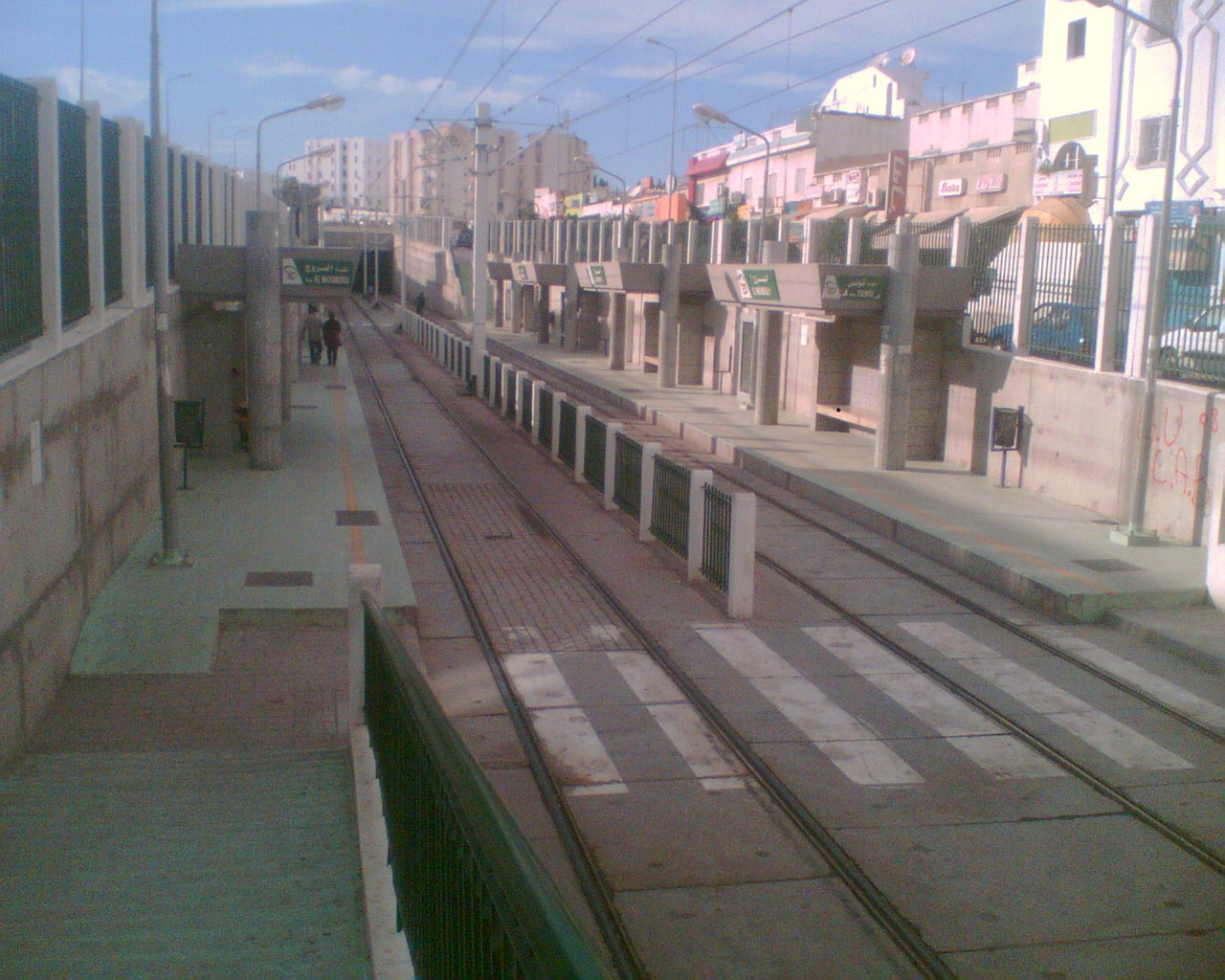
General view of the El Mourouj 1 station.

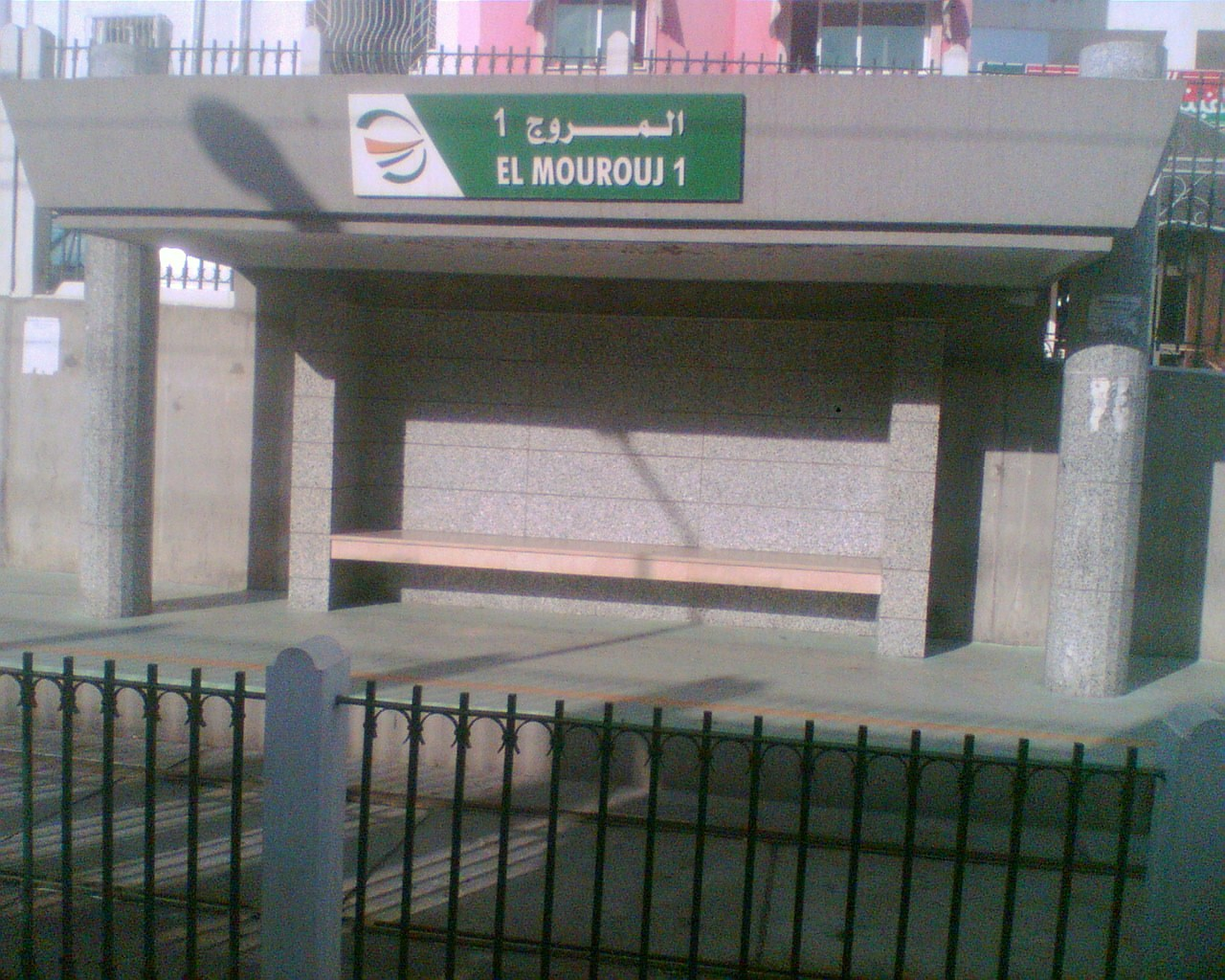
Passengers space

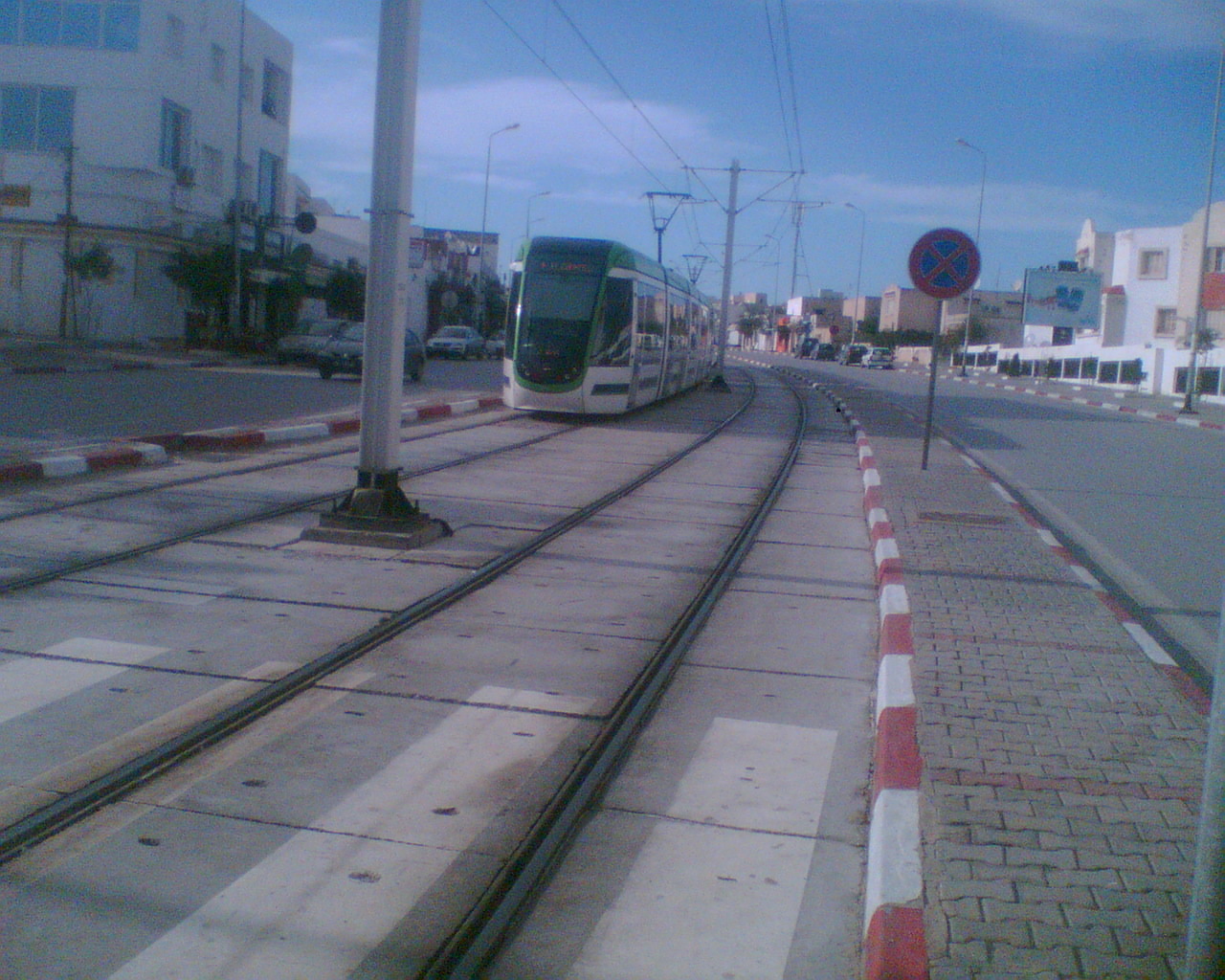
Metro on Avenue des Martyrs

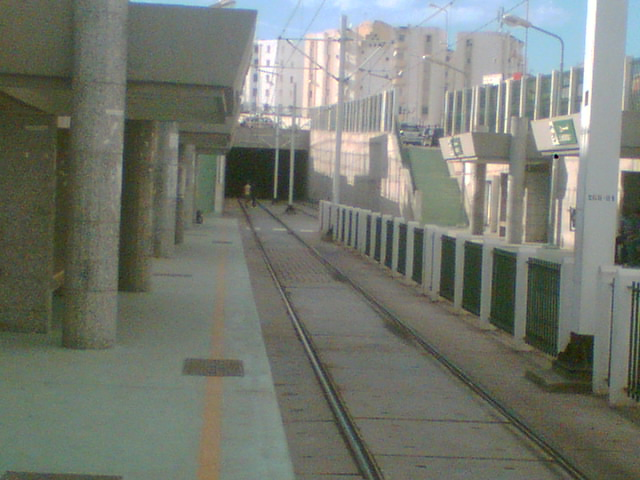
Station platform

== Population ==
2014 Census (Municipal)
Homes	Families	Males	Females	Total
31823	27164	53146	51392	104538
