= Ain Bandial =

Bruneian journalist and media entrepreneur

- عين بنديال
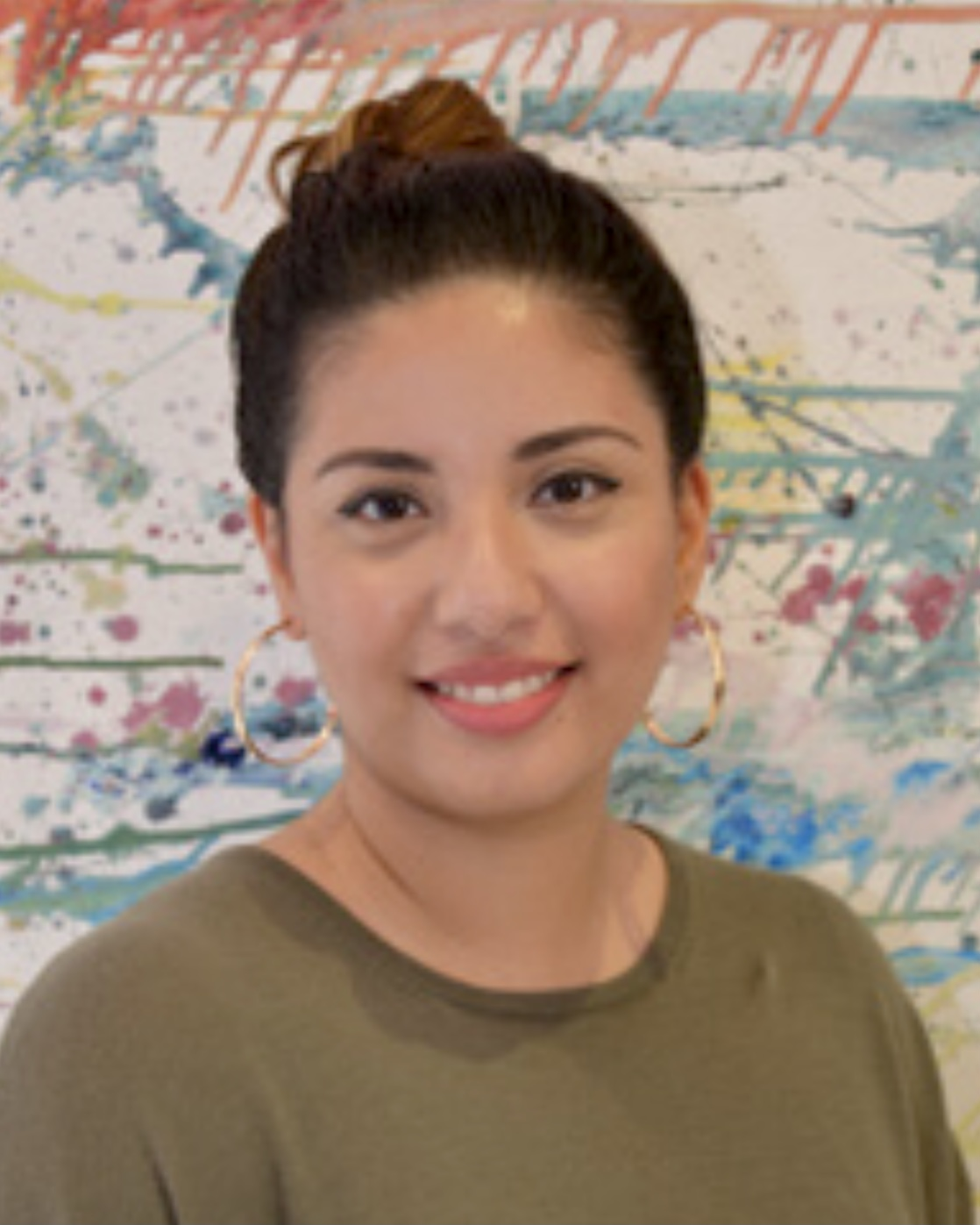
- Ain in 2015
- Born: Quratul-Ain Bandial
- Education: Curtin University (BSS)
- Occupations: Journalist; editor; entrepreneur
- Employer(s): Brunei Times and The Scoop
- Known for: co-founder and editor of The Scoop

Quratul-Ain Bandial, also known as Ain Bandial, is a journalist and media entrepreneur in Brunei who co-founded and became the editor of The Scoop in 2017. Ain has written about many different topics in her career, including human rights, the environment, and security as well as diplomacy. Her work has been published in Reuters, AFP, and The New York Times, among various international newspapers, to which she contributes.

== Education ==
Ain graduated with a Bachelor of Social Science (BSS) in history from Curtin University in 2008. joined the International Visitor Leadership Program's (IVLP) Edward R. Murrow Program for Journalists 2012 and Young Southeast Asian Leaders Initiative (YSEALI) Women's Leadership Academy in 2017. She is also a fellow of the Earth Journalism Network.

== Journalism ==
=== Brunei Times ===
Ain began work as a journalist for the Brunei Times in about 2010. She worked on news concerning Brunei and Southeast Asia. With only a day's notice, the Brunei Times abruptly announced its closure in 2016, citing competition and continuous financial losses. However, it was also reported that the newspaper had previously published a news story—later redacted—about the price of pilgrimage tickets to Mecca, which sparked rumors of a "forced closure."

Ain has written about free speech for the Brunei Times. She believes that censorship in Brunei is not a result of the law but of self-censorship by the country's journalists. She contends that the government's failure to address valid criticism is compounded by journalists' reluctance to cover sensitive topics due to the threat of imprisonment and news outlet suspension for allegedly spreading "false or malicious" news, with accusations of them acting as mere mouthpieces for government officials.

=== The Scoop ===
In 2017, Ain helped create a new and independent news source. The website cost $1,700. The Scoop is the first newsdesk in Brunei led by women and it was self funded and founded by four people: Ain Bandial, Hadthiah Hazair, Rachel Thien, Rasidah Abu Bakar. Her and Rasidah served as the editors in an organisation that is lean. There are many contributors but only a small number of employees.

Brunei has a very high proportion of its population using social media. It was reported that Brunei was the highest in Southeast Asia with nearly 70% of citizens using social media. During the COVID-19 pandemic, The Scoop faced challenges as they played a crucial role in keeping the public informed and combating misinformation. The rask was not helped as they discovered new restrictions and a sharp decline in advertising revenue. They lost 90% of their advertising over a span of five months. The Scoop produced informative videos on vaccination progress, with staff working tirelessly for over 100 consecutive days without a break or holiday.

According to Ain, more people than Brunei's population reads The Scoop, with most readers being between the ages of 18 and 34. By 2019, The Scoop has its own YouTube channel, internet radio, and print version offered as a colour magazine. Advertising and sponsored content was paying for six staff. By 2020, The Scoop had 80,000 monthly readers and 70,000 social media followers.
