= TAYO Awards =

Ten Accomplished Youth Organization (TAYO) Awards
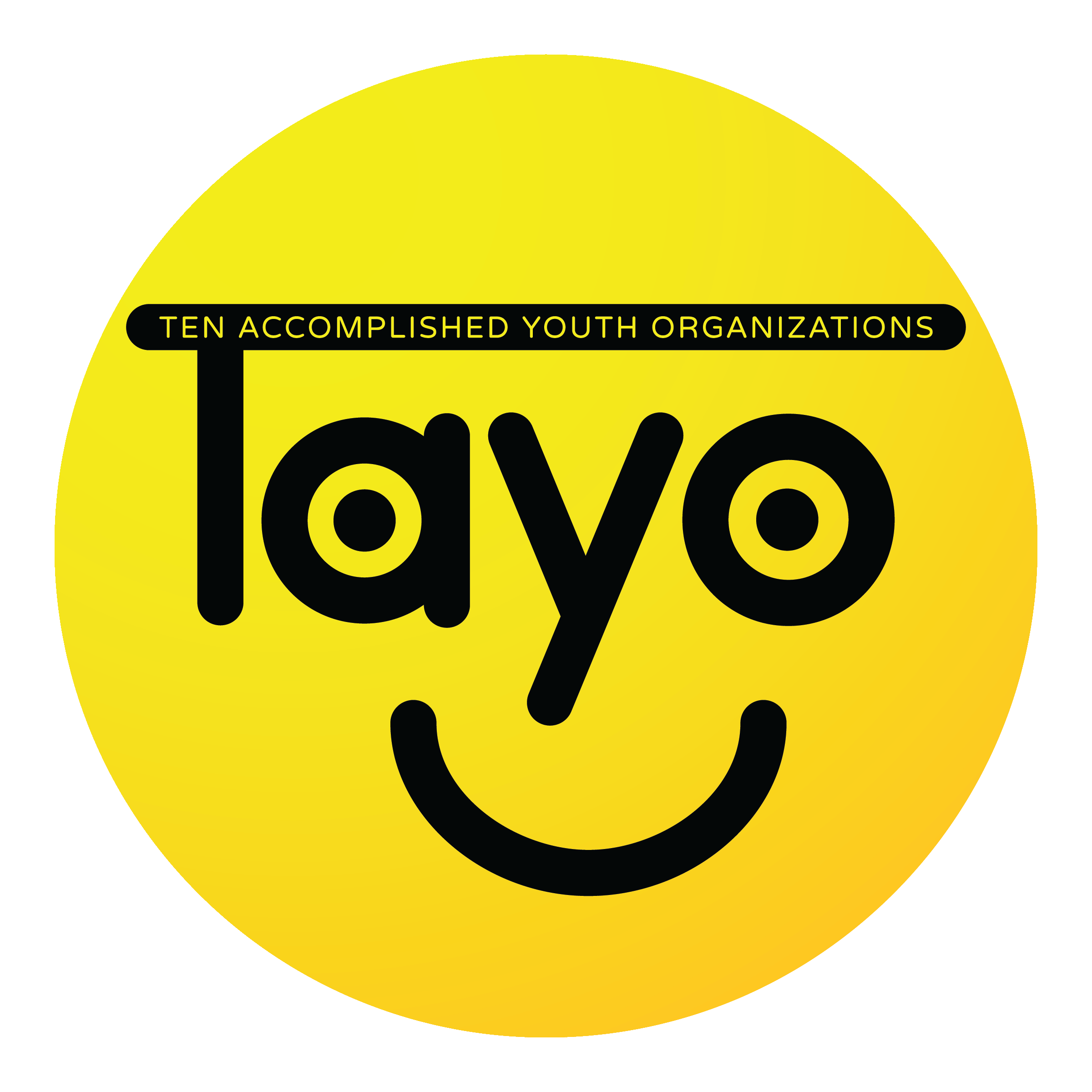
- TAYO Awards Logo
- Awarded for: Outstanding contributions of youth organizations in the Philippines
- Sponsored by: National Youth Commission (2002-2019)
- Country: Philippines
- Presented by: TAYO Awards Foundation
- Rewards: TAYO Trophy by Toym Imao, Php 50,000 grant
- First award: 2002
- Website: https://www.tayoawards.net/

Television/radio coverage
- Directed by: Patricia Matute

Precedence
- Next (higher): ASEAN TAYO Awards

The Ten Accomplished Youth Organizations (TAYO) Awards is the sole award-giving program that "recognizes and supports the outstanding contributions of youth organizations" in the Philippines. It is organized and presented annually by the Ten Accomplished Youth Organizations (TAYO) Awards Foundation since 2012.

The TAYO Awards was one of the flagship programs of the National Youth Commission until 2019. It is the most prestigious award given to youth groups in the Philippines.

== Background ==
The TAYO Awards was founded by Senator Francis Pangilinan in partnership with the then National Youth Commission Chairperson Bam Aquino in 2002. Since its establishment, the program has accommodated at least 250 nominations annually. Throughout the years, it has also gathered corporate sponsors to give out special awards to its nominees.

The TAYO Awards was one of the flagship programs of the National Youth Commission (NYC) until 2019 under Ronald Cardema's term as the commission's chairperson and CEO. The NYC stopped sponsoring the award-giving program to establish the President Rodrigo Roa Duterte Youth Leadership Awards, which eventually did not materialize.

== Process ==
=== Criteria ===
The program is open to clubs, groups, organizations, and societies whose membership and leadership are composed of at least five (5) members whose ages are 30 years old and below. The criteria for judging are as follows:

1. The project’s impact on its stakeholders
2. The project’s means of harnessing the spirit of volunteerism
3. The project’s creativity and innovation
4. The project’s sustainability;
5. The project’s effective use of resources

=== Categories ===
Participating organizations compete per category and organizations can submit multiple entries to different categories provided that each project is different. Only the four best organizations per category will be invited to the second phase of the program. The categories are:

- Education and Technology
- Health, Well-being, and Human Development
- Environment, Disaster Risk Reduction, and Climate Change Adaptation
- Livelihood and Entrepreneurship
- Culture, Arts, and Heritage

=== Rewards ===
The program's winners receive a specially commissioned trophy sculpted by Toym De Leon Imao and a grant of Php 50,000 intended to fund new projects or to continue long-term programs. Special tokens are also given by the program's partners which, in the past years, have included Coca-Cola Philippines, San Miguel Corporation, Jollibee Foods Corporation, Lenovo, and PLDT-Smart.

== Awardees ==
For a more comprehensive list, see List of TAYO Awards winners

- De La Salle Debate Society (2012) for the World United Debate Championships
- University of San Agustin Little Theater (2015) for theater production series for Typhoon Yolanda victims
- University of the Philippines Los Banos Genetic Researchers and Agricultural Innovators Society (2018) for LakBioteknolohiya
- Enactus UP Los Banos (2017) for their Amiga Philippines (now Tagani)

The Foundation opened its 21st search per the February 19 to March 17, 2024 application for accomplished and proactive youth groups with a theme of "makabayani".
