= National Innovation Council (Philippines) =

- Pambansang Konseho sa Inobasyon

Agency overview
- Formed: 2018 (Republic Act No. 11293)
- Type: Council
- Headquarters: Pasig, Metro Manila
- Agency executives: Bongbong Marcos, NIC Chairperson; Arsenio Balisacan, NIC Vice Chairperson; Rosemarie G. Edillon, NIC-ETB Chairperson; Diane Gail L. Maharjan, NIC Executive Director
- Parent agency: Department of Economy, Planning, and Development
- Child agencies: NIC Executive Technical Board; NEDA Innovation Staff
- Website: neda.gov.ph

The National Innovation Council (NIC; Filipino: Pambansang Konseho sa Inobasyon) is the Philippine government's highest policy-making body for national innovation development. It was established to develop the country's innovation goals, priorities, and long-term national strategy established by virtue of Republic Act No. 11293 or the Philippine Innovation Act of 2018. It is headed by the president of the Philippines as chairman of the NIC, with the Secretary of Socioeconomic Planning as vice-chairman.

The NIC is operationalized by an Executive Director who also leads the National Innovation Council Secretariat which is housed under the Department of Economy, Planning, and Development. It provides strategic foresight, funding, capacity building, and policy coordination initiatives for a smarter and more innovative Philippines.

The primary functions of the NIC are in the formulation and development of the National Innovation Agenda and Strategy Document (NIASD), the management of the Innovation Fund, the oversight over Innovation Credit and Financing programs through the Bangko Sentral ng Pilipinas, and in monitoring the Global Innovation Index (GII) ranking of the country.

As defined by the law, "innovation" refers to the creation of new ideas that results in the development of new or improved policies, products, processes, or services which are then spread or transferred across the market.

== Composition of the Council ==
By the virtue of Section 6 of the Philippine Innovation Act of 2018, the NIC was chaired by the President of the Philippines, vice-chaired by the Secretary for Socio-economic Planning (National Economic and Development Authority), and composed of the heads of the following member-agencies and representative executive members:

The National Innovation Council as of 2023
Board Position	Incumbent	Office
Chairman	Bongbong Marcos	President of the Philippines
Vice-Chairman	Arsenio Balisacan	Secretary of Socioeconomic Planning
Member Agencies	Renato Solidum Jr.	Secretary of Science and Technology
Member Agencies	Alfredo E. Pascual	Secretary of Trade and Industry
Member Agencies	Domingo F. Panganiban	Secretary of Agriculture
Member Agencies	Toni Yulo-Loyzaga	Secretary of Environment and Natural Resources
Member Agencies	Ted Herbosa	Secretary of Health
Member Agencies	Raphael Lotilla	Secretary of Energy
Member Agencies	Jaime Bautista	Secretary of Transportation
Member Agencies	Gilbert Teodoro	Secretary of National Defense
Member Agencies	Ivan John Uy	Secretary of Information and Communications Technology
Member Agencies	Amenah Pangandaman	Secretary of Budget and Management
Member Agencies	Benjamin Abalos Jr.	Secretary of the Interior and Local Government
Member Agencies	Enrique Manalo	Secretary of Foreign Affairs
Member Agencies	Sara Duterte	Secretary of Education
Member Agencies	Bienvenido Laguesma	Secretary of Labor and Employment
Member Agencies	J. Prospero E. De Vera III	Chairperson of the Commission on Higher Education
Member Agencies	Rowel S. Barba	Director-General of the Intellectual Property Office of the Philippines
Executive Members	Mark Sultan P. Gersava	Representative for the Micro, Small, and Medium Enterprises Sector
Executive Members	Monchito P. Ibrahim	Representative for the Business Sector
Executive Members	Earl Martin S. Valencia	Representative for the Business Sector
Executive Members	Gisella P. Concepcion	Representative for the Academe and Scientific Community
Executive Members	Ria Liza C. Canlas	Representative for the Academe and Scientific Community
Executive Members	Tirso A. Ronquilo	Representative for the Academe and Scientific Community
Executive Members	Rex Victor O. Cruz	Representative for the Academe and Scientific Community

== National Innovation Agenda and Strategy Document (NIASD) ==
Per Section 9 of the Philippine Innovation Act of 2018, the National Innovation Agenda and Strategy Document (NIASD) will be the Philippine government's 10-year foresight and innovation plan which establishes the country's vision and long-term goals for innovation consistent with the country's long-term vision, and with global and regional commitments. The document is mandated to have "innovation priority areas" and a roadmap consisting of strategies to improve innovation governance across government agencies through the following:

- coordination of innovation policies, programs and projects across agencies and LGUs;
- deepening and accelerating innovation efforts, including inclusive innovation programs that target the poorest of the poor;
- integrating and fostering public-private partnerships, including those with large businesses, MSMEs, academe, and RD&E institutions;
- recommend measures to enable and empower public and private higher education institutions (HEIs) as knowledge producers and technology generators; and
- the creation, protection, and commercialization of intellectual properties.
