= Tunis Business School =

Business school in Tunisia

- Type: Public
- Established: 2010
- Founder: Prof. Salah Ben Abdallah
- Affiliations: Tunis University
- Dean: Prof. Karim mhadhbi
- Students: 693
- Location: El Mourouj, Ben Arous, Tunisia
- Campus: Urban
- Website: tunis-business-school.tn

Tunis Business School is the first public English-language business school in Tunisia. It is based in El Mourouj in the Ben Arous Governorate. It follows the American business curriculum, and it is open to the holders of the baccalaureate in the branches of mathematics, experimental sciences, computer science and economics & management. The new institution will deliver Bachelor of Science degrees in Business Administration (B.Sc.B.A.) and Master of Science degrees. Tunis Business School opened on 4 October 2010. In the first phase, it will incorporate around 700 students, and later the number will increase to reach 7500 in the following years. The cost of establishing this business school is TND 15.4 million. It covers an area of 3 hectares, and includes an administration building, a restaurant, and library.

== Establishment ==
Officially established on 25 October 2010 (decree number 2755 of 25 October 2010), Tunis Business School is the first public business institution in Tunisia using English as the language of instruction and following an American approach to higher education.

== Curriculum ==
Students at TBS will be earning a Bachelor of Science in Business Administration (BSBA). In order to receive the degree, students must earn a minimum of 125 acceptable semester credits. At different levels of the curriculum, the students have to make choices and shape their own profiles. The student should take about 46 courses, corresponding to 123 credits, consisting of 17 Business Core Requirements, 11 courses from the Business requirements for the Major, 5 courses of Business electives for the Minor, 7 courses of nonbusiness requirements, and 4 computer science courses.

== Specialties ==
From among Accounting, Business Analytics, Finance, Information Technology, International Business Economy, and Marketing, students must choose an area of emphasis as a Major and another area with less emphasis as a Minor. The Major consists of 30 semester credits beyond business core courses and a 3-credit Senior Project course. Besides, there are currently three master's degrees at Tunis Business School; a Master of Science in Business Analytics, a Professional Master in the Management of NGOs, and a Professional Master in Fintech.

== Enrolment ==
To enroll in the Bachelor of Science Business Administration program at Tunis Business School, Baccalaureate graduates need to sit for an entrance exam in English. In addition, prospective students need to demonstrate good knowledge of Mathematics.

== See also ==
- Tunis Business School Alumni Association
- List of business schools in Africa
- List of Arab universities
- List of colleges and universities
- Mediterranean School of Business
- Education in Tunisia
