= Anna Oposa =

Marine conservationist

- Born: 1988 (age 37–38); Cebu City, Philippines
- Education: University of the Philippines Diliman (AB); Imperial College London (MS)
- Occupation: Marine conservationist
- Website: www.annaoposa.ph

Anna R. Oposa is a marine conservationist and co-founder of NGO Save Philippine Seas (SPS), an organization that aims to protect coastal and marine environments through education and community-based projects. She helped create the first shark sanctuary in the Philippines and helped designate the thresher shark as a nationally protected species. Oposa aims to combat what she believes are the biggest barriers to marine conservation: lack of coordination between local interest groups and a lack of public education around marine issues.

== Early life and education ==
Oposa had an interest in sea life early on and was exposed to environmental issues through her father's work as one of the Philippines' first environmental lawyers.

Oposa graduated with a Bachelor of Arts in English Studies (cum laude) from the University of the Philippines Diliman in 2011.

As she learned more about the marine illegal wildlife trade in the Philippines, she transitioned into conservation work. In 2014, she received the Chevening Scholarship from the British government, which she used to earn her Master of Science in Conservation Science (Merit) from Imperial College London in 2015.

In 2017, she became one of three Global Fellows in Marine Conservation at the Duke University Marine Laboratory in North Carolina, United States.

== Career ==
Oposa co-founded Save Philippine Seas (SPS) in 2011, which began as a social media campaign advocating for environmental protection and became an NGO in 2013. The organization works to conserve and restore coastal and marine resources. Her professional title, "Chief Mermaid," began as a joke but has been helpful in raising funds for the organization's conservation work. Through her work, the Municipal Mayor of Daanbantayan, Augusto Corro, issued an Executive Order to establish the country's first shark and ray sanctuary.

Oposa has also found several education programs and community-driven projects. The Shark Shelter Project, which she started in 2012, protects thresher sharks by mobilizing communities in Daanbantayan. The Sea and Earth Advocates Camp, which she founded in 2015, empowers youth to pursue conservation work. And Earthducation is a teacher training program to implement environmental education in schools.

Oposa is also a councilor on the World Future Council (WFC) and has been a consultant on environmental issues for the Asian Development Bank and the Climate Change Commission.

=== Awards ===
In 2011, Oposa was named one of Yahoo! Philippines’ Pitong Pinoy modern-day Filipino heroes.

In 2012, Oposa became the youngest person and first Filipino to win the Future for Nature Award. She also became a Marine Conservation Action Fund fellow, which awarded her 50,000 Euros to build the first pelagic thresher shark sanctuary in the Philippines. The sanctuary is near Malapascua Island. With the award, she also began developing plans for data collection, marine management, and the establishment of a marine protected area network.

In 2013, Oposa was recognized by the US-based group Devex's list of 40 Under 40 development leaders in Manila. And in 2018, she was recognized by the North American Association for Environmental Education (NAAEE) as one of its Global 30 Under 30. Anna was also one of the 2021 The Outstanding Young Men (TOYM) Awardees for her significant contributions in the field of Environment Marine Conservation.

In 2023, Oposa became a laureate of Asian Scientist 100 by the Asian Scientist.
