= Enactus =

International social entrepreneurship competition

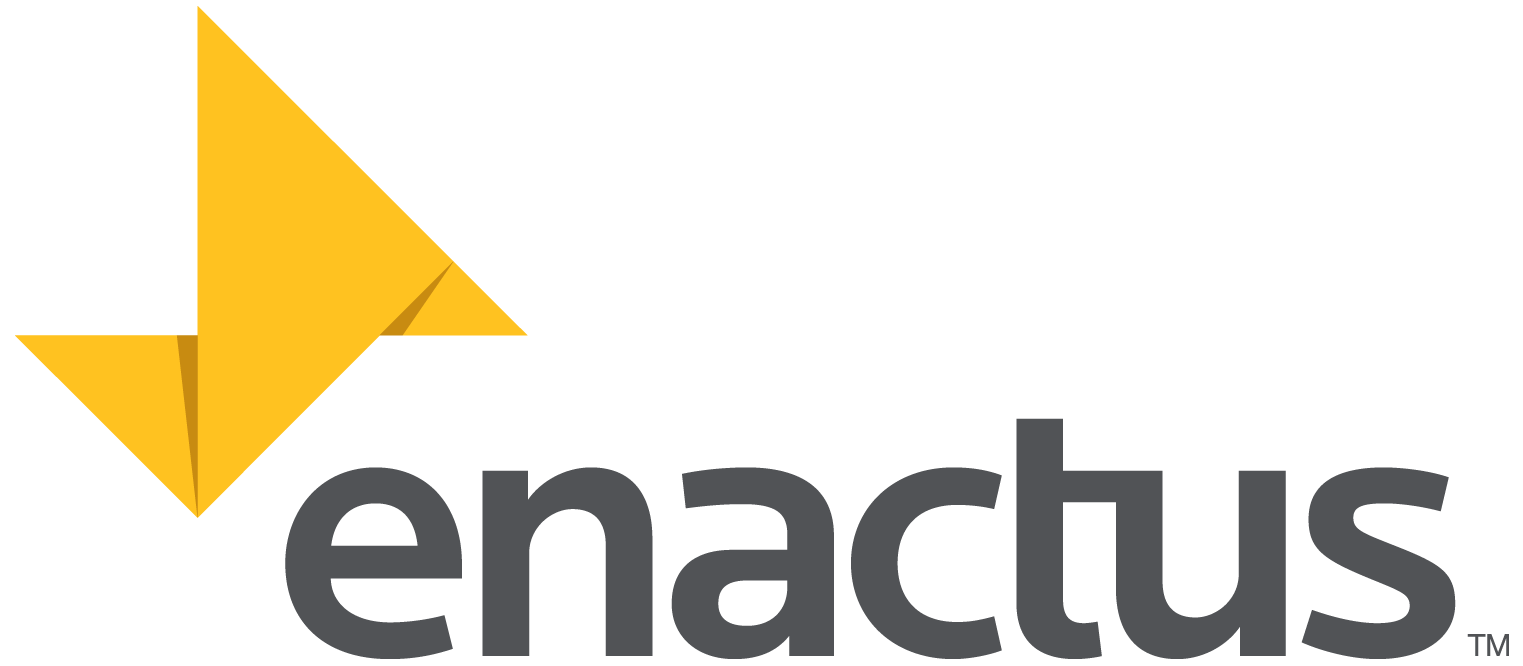
- Country: United States
- Formerly called: Students in Free Enterprise or SIFE World Cup
- Motto: To engage the next generation of entrepreneurial leaders to use innovation and business principles to improve the world.
- Established: 1975
- Winner: Saint Mary's University
- Website: http://enactus.org/

The Enactus World Cup, or Enactus, is an international social entrepreneurship project presentation competition for university students organized by Resolution Project, an international non-profit organization based in New York City. The championship formerly known as Students in Free Enterprise or SIFE has been held annually since 1975. As of 2025, 33 countries participated in the competition.

== History ==
The organization was founded in 1975 in the United States as a project of the National Leadership Institute under the name Students In Free Enterprise or SIFE. It was an international social entrepreneurship project presentation competition for university students organized by Enactus, an international non-profit organization based in Springfield, Missouri. The championship was held annually since 1975 after being established by Texas attorney Robert T. Davis, initially named Students in Free Enterprise or SIFE. In 2021, there were 1,730 Enactus teams at colleges and universities in 35 countries with around 500,000 students.

The aim of the project was to get students excited about the free market economy and to immerse them to the role of entrepreneurs and companies within the market economy. The initiative was initially only active in the US, where the number of participating teams and students grew steadily. In 1995, exchange students from the University of Nebraska-Lincoln laid the foundation for global expansion when they returned from the US to their home countries. In October 2012, the organization was renamed Enactus after a member survey by the board.

On July 13, 2023, president and CEO of Enactus, Robyn Fehrman, announced that Enactus United States and Enactus Global would be shutting down its day-to-day operations by the end of August 2023, citing financial challenges. Fehrman stated that Enactus events and chapters may continue to operate independently.

On February 15, 2024, it was announced that international nonprofit Resolution Project would commit financial and human capital to rebuild Enactus Global and form one of the largest nonprofit collaborations at the nexus of youth leadership and social entrepreneurship – engaging more than 40,000 young people each year in nearly 100 countries. On March 24, 2025, Resolution Project co-founder and CEO, George Tsiatis, wrote an op-ed in Stanford Social Innovation Review detailing the merger process between the two organizations.

=== Competition ===
The championship is held annually since 1975 after being established by Texas attorney Robert T. Davis, initially named Students in Free Enterprise or SIFE. As of 2021, 33 countries participated in the competition. Al-Azhar University from Egypt won 2020's contest. Because of the COVID-19 pandemic, the 2021 edition of the competition was held virtually, with the winner being October 6 University of Egypt. The 2022 Enactus World Cup was held October 30 – November 2, 2022 in Puerto Rico, with the winner being Ain Shams University of Egypt. The 2023 event was scheduled for October 17 – 20, 2023 in Utrecht, the Netherlands. The 2024 event was held in Astana, Kazakhstan with Tunis Business School from Tunisia winning the event.

=== Management ===
Alvin Rohrs was CEO for 30 years until 2016, when he was succeeded by Rachael Jarosh who was CEO until June 2021. Robyn Schryer Fehrman, previously a director at Duke University, was the president and CEO from September 2021 to July 13th, 2023. George M. Tsiatis became president and CEO in January 2025.

In 2014, a former Sam M. Walton SIFE Fellow (as SIFE faculty advisers were then known) authored a memoir about his experience with SIFE. The book, How High Is Up, was critical of SIFE's management and ethical practices. As a result, the SIFE board commissioned an independent investigation that resulted in several changes to the company's internal controls.
