= 2023–24 Espérance Sportive de Tunis season =

Espérance de Tunis
2023–24 season
- President: Hamdi Meddeb
- Head coach: Mouin Chaâbani (until 2 October); Tarek Thabet (from 2 October to 12 January); Miguel Cardoso (from 12 January)
- Stadium: Stade Hammadi Agrebi
- Ligue 1: Winners
- Tunisian Cup: Round of 32
- CAF Champions League: Runners-up
- African Football League: Semi-finals
- Arab Club Champions Cup: Group stage
- Top goalscorer: League: Rodrigo Rodrigues (10); All: Rodrigo Rodrigues (11)
- Biggest win: Espérance de Tunis 3–0 TP Mazembe (26 October 2023); Espérance de Tunis 3–0 US Tataouine (13 December 2023)
- Biggest defeat: Al Hilal 3–1 Espérance de Tunis (1 December 2023); Stade Tunisien 2–0 Espérance de Tunis (5 May 2024)
Home colours

The 2023–24 Espérance Sportive de Tunis season was the 105th season in existence and the club's 69th consecutive season in the top flight of Tunisian football. In addition to the domestic league, Espérance de Tunis participated in this season's editions of the Tunisian Cup, the CAF Champions League, the African Football League and Arab Club Champions Cup.

On the domestic front, Espérance de Tunis regained the league and won a record-extending 33rd title, following a 2–0 win against US Monastir, but they were eliminated from the Tunisian Cup in the round of 32 after a 2–1 after extra time loss against OC Kerkennah.

On the continental front, Espérnace reached the Champions League final for the first time since 2019, where they were narrowly defeated 1–0 on aggregate by Al Ahly. They also reached the semi-finals of the inaugural African Football League before being eliminated by Wydad AC after a 1–1 draw on aggregate and a 5–4 loss on penalties. In the Arab Club Champions Cup, Espérance were eliminated in the group stage.

== Squad list ==
Note: Flags indicate national team as has been defined under FIFA eligibility rules. Players may hold more than one non-FIFA nationality.

Staff:

- (Portugal) Fábio Fernandes (assistant manager) (from 12 January)
- (Tunisia) Chamseddine Dhaouadi (assistant manager)
- (Tunisia) Wassim Naouara (goalkeeper manager)
- (Portugal) Carlos Miguel Silva (fitness manager) (from 12 January)
- (Tunisia) Mohamed Sabri Bouazizi (fitness manager)
- (Portugal) Pedro Azevedo (Analyst) (from 13 March)
- (Tunisia) Yassine Ben Ahmed (doctor)
- (Egypt) Wessam Safwat (Analyst) (until 13 March)
- (Tunisia) Seifallah Hosni (assistant manager) (until 12 January)
- (Tunisia) José Clayton (assistant manager) (until 12 January)
- (Tunisia) Ahmed Hammadi (fitness manager) (until 12 January)
- (Tunisia) Mejdi Traoui (assistant manager) (until 2 October)

Other players under contract:

- (Tunisia) Raed Fedaa
- (Tunisia) Zied Machmoum

No.	Nat.	Name	Date of Birth (Age)	Signed from
Goalkeepers
1	(Tunisia)	Amenallah Memmiche	20 April 2004 (aged 20)	(Tunisia) Youth system
12	(Tunisia)	Moez Ben Cherifia (C)	24 June 1991 (aged 32)	(Tunisia) Youth system
26	(Tunisia)	Mohamed Sedki Debchi	28 October 1999 (aged 24)	(Tunisia) AS Gabès
Defenders
2	(Tunisia)	Mohamed Ben Ali	16 February 1995 (aged 29)	(Tunisia) CS Sfaxien
3	(Tunisia)	Amenallah Majhed	18 August 2003 (aged 20)	(Tunisia) Youth system
5	(Tunisia)	Yassine Meriah	2 July 1993 (aged 30)	(United Arab Emirates) Al Ain
13	(Tunisia)	Raed Bouchniba	25 September 2003 (aged 20)	(Tunisia) Youth system
15	(Algeria)	Mohamed Amine Tougai	22 January 2000 (aged 24)	(Algeria) NA Hussein Dey
20	(Tunisia)	Mohamed Amine Ben Hamida	15 December 1995 (aged 28)	(Tunisia) Youth system
22	(Tunisia)	Hani Amamou	16 September 1997 (aged 26)	(Tunisia) CS Sfaxien
30	(Tunisia)	Oussama Shili	30 November 1996 (aged 27)	(Tunisia) Stade Tunisien
Midfielders
4	(Tunisia)	Wael Derbali	18 June 2003 (aged 21)	(Tunisia) Olympique Béja
8	(Tunisia)	Houssem Tka	16 August 2000 (aged 23)	(Tunisia) US Monastir
10	(Brazil)	Yan Sasse	24 June 1997 (aged 26)	(New Zealand) Wellington Phoenix
23	(Tunisia)	Ghaith Ouahabi	2 May 2003 (aged 21)	(Tunisia) Youth system
25	(Tunisia)	Ghailene Chaalali	28 February 1994 (aged 30)	(Turkey) Yeni Malatyaspor
31	(Tunisia)	Zakaria El Ayeb	15 January 2001 (aged 23)	(Tunisia) Youth system
32	(Tunisia)	Montassar Triki	29 August 2001 (aged 22)	(Tunisia) Youth system
36	(Nigeria)	Onuche Ogbelu	10 May 2003 (aged 21)	(Nigeria) Nasarawa United
38	(Togo)	Roger Aholou	30 December 1993 (aged 30)	(Morocco) Raja CA
Forwards
9	(Brazil)	Rodrigo Rodrigues	18 June 1996 (aged 28)	(Brazil) Juventude
11	(Tunisia)	Oussama Bouguerra	17 October 1997 (aged 26)	(Tunisia) Olympique Béja
17	(Tunisia)	Zied Berrima	4 September 2001 (aged 22)	(Tunisia) Youth system
18	(Algeria)	Houssam Ghacha	22 October 1995 (aged 28)	(Turkey) Antalyaspor
21	(Tunisia)	Aziz Abid	3 April 2003 (aged 21)	(Tunisia) Youth system
24	(France)	Bilel Sahli	6 November 2003 (aged 20)	(Italy) Napoli
27	(The Gambia)	Kebba Sowe	8 August 2005 (aged 18)	(Tunisia) AS Soliman
29	(Tunisia)	Mohamed Ali Ben Hammouda	24 July 1998 (aged 25)	(Tunisia) AS Soliman
37	(Democratic Republic of the Congo)	André Bukia	3 March 1995 (aged 29)	(Portugal) Arouca
Manager	(Portugal)	Miguel Cardoso	28 May 1972 (aged 52)	(Portugal) Rio Ave

== Transfers ==
=== In ===
Date	Name	From	Type	Source
1 July 2023	(Nigeria) Anayo Iwuala	(Algeria) CR Belouizdad	End of loan	
1 July 2023	(Tunisia) Montassar Triki	(Tunisia) AS Soliman	End of loan	—
1 July 2023	(Tunisia) Khalil Guenichi	(Tunisia) AS Soliman	End of loan	—
1 July 2023	(Tunisia) Achref Jabri	(Tunisia) Espérance de Zarzis	End of loan	—
1 July 2023	(Niger) Youssouf Oumarou	(Tunisia) US Monastir	Free transfer	
3 July 2023	(Tunisia) Oussama Bouguerra	(Tunisia) Olympique Béja	Free transfer	
3 July 2023	(Tunisia) Houssem Tka	(Tunisia) US Monastir	Free transfer	
13 July 2023	(Tunisia) Oussama Shili	(Tunisia) Stade Tunisien	Transfer	
25 July 2023	(Algeria) Houssam Ghacha	(Turkey) Antalyaspor	Transfer	
4 August 2023	(Brazil) Yan Sasse	(New Zealand) Wellington Phoenix	Free transfer	
17 August 2023	(Tunisia) Wael Derbali	(Tunisia) Olympique Béja	Transfer	
25 August 2023	(France) Bilel Sahli	(Italy) Napoli	Free transfer	
22 September 2023	(The Gambia) Kebba Sowe	(Tunisia) AS Soliman	Loan	
30 September 2023	(Brazil) Rodrigo Rodrigues	(Brazil) Juventude	Transfer	
30 September 2023	(Nigeria) Onuche Ogbelu	(Nigeria) Nasarawa United	Transfer	
5 January 2024	(The Gambia) Kebba Sowe	(Tunisia) AS Soliman	Transfer	
31 January 2024	(Democratic Republic of the Congo) André Bukia	(Portugal) Arouca	Transfer	
31 January 2024	(Togo) Roger Aholou	(Morocco) Raja CA	Free transfer	

=== Out ===
Date	Name	To	Type	Source
1 July 2023	(Tunisia) Mohamed Ali Ben Romdhane	(Hungary) Ferencváros	End of contract	
1 July 2023	(Libya) Hamdou Elhouni	(Morocco) Wydad AC	End of contract	
1 July 2023	(Ivory Coast) Fousseny Coulibaly	(Libya) Asswehly	End of contract	
1 July 2023	(Tunisia) Mohamed Ali Yacoubi	(Tunisia) AS Marsa	End of contract	
1 July 2023	(Tunisia) Anice Badri	Free agent	End of contract	—
28 July 2023	(Ivory Coast) David Koffi	(Ivory Coast) AFAD Djékanou	Mutual termination	—
3 August 2023	(Tunisia) Malek Mehri	(Canada) Vancouver Whitecaps	Transfer	
10 August 2023	(Nigeria) Anayo Iwuala	(Kuwait) Al Arabi	Transfer	
16 August 2023	(Tunisia) Ghassen Mahersi	(Tunisia) US Tataouine	Loan	
16 August 2023	(Tunisia) Wael Chaieb	(Tunisia) US Tataouine	Loan	
22 August 2023	(Tunisia) Houssem Dagdoug	(Egypt) Tala'ea El Gaish	Mutual termination	
24 August 2023	(Morocco) Sabir Bougrine	(Morocco) Raja CA	Mutual termination	
31 August 2023	(Tunisia) Rached Arfaoui	(Tunisia) Club Africain	Mutual termination	
1 September 2023	(Tunisia) Wassim Karoui	(Tunisia) AS Soliman	Loan	
15 September 2023	(Tunisia) Rayen Hamrouni	(Tunisia) AS Soliman	Loan	
16 September 2023	(Tunisia) Achref Jabri	(Tunisia) Espérance de Zarzis	Loan	
28 September 2023	(Tunisia) Khalil Guenichi	(Tunisia) AS Soliman	Loan	
19 November 2023	(Tunisia) Bilel Chabbar	(Libya) Al Dhahra	Transfer	
3 December 2023	(Jordan) Sharara	(Libya) Al Ahli Tripoli	Mutual termination	
24 January 2024	(Tunisia) Aziz Fellah	(Tunisia) AS Gabès	Loan	
25 January 2024	(Tunisia) Farouk Mimouni	(Tunisia) AS Marsa	Transfer	
27 January 2024	(Ivory Coast) Cedrik Gbo	(Tunisia) AS Soliman	Transfer	—
29 January 2024	(Tunisia) Mouhib Selmi	(Tunisia) AS Gabès	Loan	
30 January 2024	(Tunisia) Hamza Ghanmi	(Tunisia) US Tataouine	Loan	
31 January 2024	(Tunisia) Mootez Zaddem	(Egypt) Al Masry	Loan	
31 January 2024	(Niger) Youssouf Oumarou	(Tunisia) Stade Tunisien	Mutual termination	
31 January 2024	(Algeria) Riad Benayad	(Morocco) Raja CA	Loan	
2 February 2024	(Tunisia) Zinedine Sassi	(Tunisia) AS Soliman	Loan	

== Friendlies ==
19 July 2023 Friendly	Espérance de Tunis	3–0	(Tanzania) Azam	Tunis
18:00	Oumarou; Tougai; Mimouni			Stadium: Espérance de Tunis Training Center

8 September 2023 Friendly	Espérance de Tunis	2–1	AS Soliman	Tunis
17:00	Bouguerra 41' (pen.); Sasse 82'		Bilel 12'	Stadium: Espérance de Tunis Training Center

14 October 2023 Friendly	Espérance de Tunis	3–0	AS Soliman	Tunis
15:45	Zaddem 2'; Rodrigues 45'; Ben Hammouda			Stadium: Espérance de Tunis Training Center; Attendance: 0 (close doors)

18 November 2023 Friendly	Espérance de Tunis	2–0	ES Rogba	Tunis
16:15	Ben Hammouda; Ghacha			Stadium: Espérance de Tunis Training Center

24 January 2024 Friendly	Espérance de Tunis	4–1	AS Soukra	Tunis
15:00	Sowe 14'; Rodrigues 59' (pen.), 67'; Ogbelu 82'		Bouraoui 19' (pen.)	Stadium: Espérance de Tunis Training Center; Attendance: 0 (close doors)

27 January 2024 Friendly	Espérance de Tunis	2–0	AS Soliman	Tunis
	Sowe; Bouchniba			Stadium: Espérance de Tunis Training Center; Attendance: 0 (close doors)

4 February 2024 Friendly	Chabab Essoukhour Assaouda (Morocco)	0–10	Espérance de Tunis	Casablanca, Morocco
11:30 UTC+1			Rodrigues 17' (pen.), 34', 56'; El Ayeb 44'; Ben Hammouda 72', 76'; Bouguerra 79', 87'; Meriah 85' (pen.); Tka 88'

4 February 2024 Friendly	Raja CA B (Morocco)	0–1	Espérance de Tunis	Casablanca, Morocco
17:30 UTC+1			Meriah 74'

11 February 2024 Friendly	US Monastir	0–1	Espérance de Tunis	Monastir
14:30			Sasse 83'	Stadium: Stade Mustapha Ben Jannet

17 February 2024 Friendly	Espérance de Tunis	5–0	AS Oued Ellil	Tunis
17:00				Stadium: Espérance de Tunis Training Center; Attendance: 0 (close doors)

23 March 2024 Friendly	Espérance de Tunis	5–0	AS d'Ariana	Tunis
22:00	Rodrigues; Chaalali; Meriah; Sowe			Stadium: Espérance de Tunis Training Center; Attendance: 0 (close doors)

8 June 2024 Friendly	Espérance de Tunis	4–0	AS Soukra	Tunis
18:00				Stadium: Espérance de Tunis Training Center

== Competitions ==
=== Overview ===
Competition	Record								Starting round	Final position / round	First match	Last match
Competition	G	W	D	L	GF	GA	GD	Win %	Starting round	Final position / round	First match	Last match
Ligue 1	22	16	5	1	33	12	+21	72.73	First round	Winners	19 August 2023	20 June 2024
Tunisian Cup	1	0	0	1	1	2	−1	0.00	Round of 32		8 May 2024	
CAF Champions League	14	6	6	2	9	4	+5	42.86	Second round	Runners-up	17 September 2023	25 May 2024
African Football League	4	2	0	2	4	2	+2	50.00	Quarter-finals	Semi-finals	22 October 2023	1 November 2023
Arab Club Champions Cup	3	0	2	1	1	2	−1	0.00	Group stage		27 July 2023	2 August 2023
Total	44	24	13	7	48	22	+26	54.55			27 July 2023	20 June 2024

Source: Competitions

=== Ligue 1 ===
==== First round ====
Group B

The draw of the first round was held on 1 August 2023.

===== League table =====
Pos	Team	Pld	W	D	L	GF	GA	GD	Pts	Qualification
1	Espérance de Tunis	12	10	2	0	20	5	+15	32	Advance to the playoff
2	US Monastir	12	8	2	2	22	9	+13	26	Advance to the playoff
3	CS Sfaxien	12	6	2	4	12	4	+8	20	Advance to the playoff
4	CA Bizertin	12	4	4	4	12	13	−1	16	Advance to the playout
5	ES Métlaoui	12	2	3	7	10	20	−10	9 (Note: Ranked on head-to-head points: ES Métlaoui 4, US Tataouine 1.)	Advance to the playout

Source: Tunisian Football Federation
Rules for classification: 1) points; 2) head-to-head points; 3) head-to-head goal difference; 4) goal difference; 5) total goals; 6) fairplay ranking; 7) playoff.

===== Results by round =====
Round	1	2	3	4	5	6	7	8	9	10	11	12	13	14
Ground	H	A	H	E	A	H	A	A	H	A	E	H	A	H
Result	W	D	W	E	W	W	W	W	W	W	E	W	W	D

Source: Competitive matches
A = Away; H = Home; W = Win; D = Draw; L = Loss; E = Exempt

===== Matches =====
19 August 2023 Round 1	Espérance de Tunis	1–0	AS Marsa	Tunis
16:30	Bouguerra 43'; Bouchniba (yellow card) 71'	Report	Karoui (yellow card) 30'; Werzli (yellow card) 73'	Stadium: Stade Hammadi Agrebi; Referee: Khaled Gouider

27 August 2023 Round 2	US Tataouine	1–1	Espérance de Tunis	Tataouine
16:30	Mednini (yellow card) 73'; Shili 76' (o.g.)	Report	Oumarou 34'	Stadium: Stade Nejib Khattab; Referee: Achref Harakati

2 September 2023 Round 3	Espérance de Tunis	3–2	ES Métlaoui	Tunis
16:00	Meriah 6' (pen.), 37'; Ghacha 75'	Report	Mastouri 21', (yellow card) 21'; Ben Atig (yellow card) 25'; Tapsoba 30'; Jaballah (yellow card) 90+4'	Stadium: Stade Hammadi Agrebi; Referee: Amir Loussif

24 September 2023 Round 5	CS Sfaxien	0–1	Espérance de Tunis	Sfax
15:30	Conté (yellow card) 18'; Mhadhebi (yellow card) 34'	Report	Sasse 82'; Memmiche (yellow card) 89'; Tougai (red card) 90+3'	Stadium: Stade Taïeb Mhiri; Referee: Khaled Gouider

7 October 2023 Round 6	Espérance de Tunis	2–0	US Monastir	Tunis
17:30	Meriah 26' (pen.); Sasse (yellow card) 48'; Rodrigues 82'	Report	Nefzi (yellow card) 25'; Sarr (yellow card) 86'	Stadium: Stade Hammadi Agrebi; Referee: Nidhal Letaief

8 November 2023 Round 7	CA Bizertin	0–2	Espérance de Tunis	Bizerte
14:30	Sow (yellow card) 90+2'; Seydi (yellow card) 90+3'	Report	A. Ferchichi 13' (o.g.); Sasse 43'	Stadium: Stade du 15 Octobre; Referee: Haythem Guirat

12 November 2023 Round 10	ES Métlaoui	0–2	Espérance de Tunis	Métlaoui
14:30	Khelifa (yellow card) 66'; Jaballah (yellow card) 90'	Report	El Ayeb 27'; Sasse (yellow card) 72'; Zaddem 86'; Tougai (yellow card) 89'	Stadium: Stade Municipal de Métlaoui; Referee: Amir Ayadi

5 December 2023 Round 8	AS Marsa	0–1	Espérance de Tunis	Tunis
14:00	Jammeli (yellow card) 36'; Werzli (yellow card) 76'; Ben Messaoud (yellow card) 85'; Trabelsi (yellow card) 86'	Report	Sahli (yellow card) 29'; Derbali 59'	Stadium: Stade Abdelaziz Chtioui; Referee: Karim Khemiri

13 December 2023 Round 9	Espérance de Tunis	3–0	US Tataouine	Tunis
14:00	El Ayeb 4'; Rodrigues 58'; Benhamed 63' (o.g.)	Report	K. Khalfa (yellow card) 85'	Stadium: Stade Hammadi Agrebi; Referee: Oussama Ben Ishak

27 December 2023 Round 12	Espérance de Tunis	1–0	CS Sfaxien	Tunis
14:00	Bouguerra 17'; Memmiche (yellow card) 90+3'	Report	Conté (yellow card) 90'	Stadium: Stade Hammadi Agrebi; Referee: Haythem Guirat

30 December 2023 Round 13	US Monastir	1–2	Espérance de Tunis	Monastir
16:30	Traoré (yellow card) 8'; Aït Malek (yellow card) 29'; Mannai (yellow card) 37'; Aloui 90+3'; Jebali (yellow card) 90+5'	Report	Meriah (yellow card) 8'; Oumarou 27'; Sasse (yellow card) 60'; Sowe 88'; Bouguerra (yellow card) 90+5'	Stadium: Stade Mustapha Ben Jannet; Referee: Khaled Gouider

3 January 2024 Round 14	Espérance de Tunis	1–1	CA Bizertin	Tunis
14:00	Sowe 10'	Report	Seydi 89' (pen.)	Stadium: Stade Hammadi Agrebi; Referee: Abdessalem Mani

==== Playoff ====
The draw of the playoff was held on 14 January 2024.

===== League table =====
Pos	Team	Pld	W	D	L	GF	GA	GD	Pts	Qualification
1	Espérance de Tunis (C)	10	6	3	1	13	7	+6	24 (Note: Étoile du Sahel and Espérance de Tunis were added 3 points (1sts of the groups in the first round).)	Qualification for the Champions League
2	US Monastir	10	3	5	2	8	5	+3	16 (Note: Stade Tunisien and US Monastir were added 2 points (2nds of the groups in the first round).)	Qualification for the Champions League
3	CS Sfaxien	10	2	6	2	6	5	+1	13 (Note: Club Africain and CS Sfaxien were added 1 point (3rds of the groups in the first round).)	Qualification for the Confederation Cup
4	Stade Tunisien	10	1	8	1	5	5	0	13	Qualification for the Confederation Cup
5	Étoile du Sahel	10	0	7	3	4	7	−3	10	

Source: Tunisian Football Federation
Rules for classification: 1) points; 2) head-to-head points; 3) head-to-head goal difference; 4) goal difference; 5) total goals; 6) fairplay ranking; 7) playoff.
(C) Champions

===== Results by round =====
Round	1	2	3	4	5	6	7	8	9	10
Ground	H	A	H	A	H	A	H	A	H	A
Result	W	W	W	D	D	L	W	W	W	D
Position	1	1	1	1	1	1	1	1	1	1

Source: Competitive matches
A = Away; H = Home; W = Win; D = Draw; L = Loss

===== Matches =====
5 March 2024 Round 1	Espérance de Tunis	2–0	Stade Tunisien	Tunis
17:00	Meriah 42' (pen.); Touagi (yellow card) 75'; Rodrigues 90+9'	Report	Jouini (yellow card) 26'	Stadium: Stade Hammadi Agrebi; Referee: Amir Loussif

10 March 2024 Round 2	Étoile du Sahel	0–1	Espérance de Tunis	Sousse
14:30	Jelassi (yellow card) 44'; Jertila (yellow card) 58'; Mbé (yellow card) 78'; Abid (yellow card) 81'	Report	Aholou (yellow card) 3'; Ben Hamida (yellow card) 9'; Chaalali (yellow card) 64'; Bouguerra (yellow card) 74'; Rodrigues 80', (yellow card) 82'	Stadium: Stade Olympique de Sousse; Referee: Khaled Gouider

16 March 2024 Round 3	Espérance de Tunis	1–0	Club Africain	Tunis
21:30	Rodrigues 8'; El Ayeb (yellow card) 28'; Sasse (yellow card) 51'	Report	Ben Yahia (yellow card) 32'; C. Labidi (yellow card) 40'; Arfaoui (yellow card) 90+2'	Stadium: Stade Hammadi Agrebi; Referee: Haythem Guirat

14 April 2024 Round 4	US Monastir	1–1	Espérance de Tunis	Monastir
17:30	Aït Malek (yellow card) 18'; Yaakoubi 90+3'	Report	Ben Ali (yellow card) 26'; Rodrigues 37', (yellow card) 53'	Stadium: Stade Mustapha Ben Jannet; Referee: Amir Ayadi

1 May 2024 Round 5	Espérance de Tunis	1–1	CS Sfaxien	Tunis
17:30	Rodrigues 5'; Aholou (yellow card) 27' (yellow-red card) 45'; Chaalali (yellow card) 78'	Report	Kouamé (yellow card) 24'; Beranger 46'; Zaidi (yellow card) 78'; Belwefi (yellow card) 90+4'	Stadium: Stade Hammadi Agrebi; Referee: Amir Loussif

5 May 2024 Round 6	Stade Tunisien	2–0	Espérance de Tunis	Tunis
15:00	Ndaw (yellow card) 59'; Laifi (yellow card) 71'; Oumarou 80'; Sahraoui 84'; Saafi (yellow card) 89'	Report	Derbali (yellow card) 32'; Ogbelu (yellow card) 45+1'; Bouguerra (yellow card) 78'	Stadium: Stade Hédi Enneifer; Referee: Yosri Bouali

12 May 2024 Round 7	Espérance de Tunis	3–2	Étoile du Sahel	Tunis
17:30	Rodrigues 18'; Ben Hamida (yellow card) 20'; Sasse (yellow card) 45+1'; Ghacha 59'; Meriah 85' (pen.), (yellow card) 86'	Report	Aouani 13'; Chamakhi (yellow card) 23'; Sidibe (yellow card) 66'; Barhoumi 68'; Ghedamsi (yellow card) 83' (yellow-red card) 90+5'; Jebali (yellow card) 90+7'	Stadium: Stade Hammadi Agrebi; Referee: Houssem Boularesse

2 June 2024 Round 8	Club Africain	1–2	Espérance de Tunis	Tunis
19:00	Taous (yellow card) 20'; Eduwo (yellow card) 55', (goal) 90+11' (pen.)	Report	Sasse 3'; Rodrigues 26'; Ben Hamida (yellow card) 53'; Chaalali (yellow card) 82'; Memmiche (yellow card) 90+28'	Stadium: Stade Hammadi Agrebi; Referee: Ahmed Kazem (Iraq)

15 June 2024 Round 9	Espérance de Tunis	2–0	US Monastir	Tunis
19:00	Rodrigues 21'; El Ayeb (yellow card) 31'; Slimane 66' (o.g.)	Report	Trayi (yellow card) 30'; Soltani (yellow card) 62'; Dridi (yellow card) 88'	Stadium: Stade Hammadi Agrebi; Attendance: 0 (close doors); Referee: Mehrez Melki

20 June 2024 Round 10	CS Sfaxien	0–0	Espérance de Tunis	Sfax
17:30		Report	Ogbelu (yellow card) 35'; Ben Ali (yellow card) 90+5'	Stadium: Stade Taïeb Mhiri; Referee: Ameur Chouchane

==== Results summary ====
Overall								Home						Away					
Pld	W	D	L	GF	GA	GD	Pts	W	D	L	GF	GA	GD	W	D	L	GF	GA	GD
22	16	5	1	33	12	+21	53	9	2	0	20	6	+14	7	3	1	13	6	+7

Source: Competitive matches

NB: As group B winners, Espérance de Tunis were added 3 points in the playoff that were not counted in this summary.

=== Tunisian Cup ===
Espérance de Tunis entered the tournament in the round of 32, as they were part of the 2023–24 Tunisian Ligue Professionnelle 1.

8 May 2024 Round of 32	OC Kerkennah	2–1 (a.e.t.)	Espérance de Tunis	Sfax
14:30	Rekik (yellow card) 44'; Moussa 69'; Zitouni 112', (yellow card) 113'	Report	Bouchniba (yellow card) 43'; Frikhi (red card) 58'; Amamou (red card) 66'; Ouahabi (yellow card) 76'; Meriah 89' (pen.)	Stadium: Stade Taïeb Mhiri; Referee: Haythem Kossai

=== CAF Champions League ===
==== Qualifying rounds ====
The draw of the qualifying rounds was held on 25 July 2023.

===== Second round =====
17 September 2023 First leg	AS Douanes Burkina Faso	0–1	(Tunisia) Espérance de Tunis	Yamoussoukro (Ivory Coast)
16:00 UTC+0	Barro (yellow card) 25'; Sere (yellow card) 75'	Report	Meriah (penalty missed) 16', (yellow card) 29'; Tougai 27' (pen.); Ouahabi (yellow card) 45'; Ben Cherifia (yellow card) 68'; Ben Hammouda (yellow card) 78'; Tka (yellow card) 86'; Oumarou (yellow card) 90'	Stadium: Charles Konan Banny Stadium; Referee: Georges Gatogato (Burundi)

30 September 2023 Second leg	Espérance de Tunis (Tunisia)	0–0 (1–0 agg.)	AS Douanes Burkina Faso	Tunis
17:00 UTC+1		Report	Bagate (yellow card) 6'; Sosso (yellow card) 24'	Stadium: Stade Hammadi Agrebi; Referee: Bamlak Tessema Weyesa (Ethiopia)

==== Group stage ====
The draw of the group stage was held on 6 October 2023.

Group C

Pos	Team	Pld	W	D	L	GF	GA	GD	Pts	Qualification	APL	EST	HIL	ESS
1	(Angola) Petro de Luanda	6	3	3	0	5	0	+5	12	Advance to knockout stage	—	0–0	1–0	2–0
2	(Tunisia) Espérance de Tunis	6	3	2	1	6	3	+3	11	Advance to knockout stage	0–0	—	1–0	2–0
3	(Sudan) Al Hilal	6	1	2	3	4	5	−1	5		0–0	3–1	—	1–1
4	(Tunisia) Étoile du Sahel	6	1	1	4	2	9	−7	4		0–2	0–2	1–0	—

Source: CAF

25 November 2023 Matchday 1	Espérance de Tunis (Tunisia)	2–0	(Tunisia) Étoile du Sahel	Tunis
17:00 UTC+1	Sasse 60'; Meriah 64' (pen.); Ben Ali (yellow card) 68'; Bouguerra (yellow card) 86'; Tougai (yellow card) 90+5'	Report	Mbé (yellow card) 16'; Ghedamsi (yellow card) 48'	Stadium: Stade Hammadi Agrebi; Referee: Mohamed Adel (Egypt)

1 December 2023 Matchday 2	Al Hilal (Sudan)	3–1	(Tunisia) Espérance de Tunis	Dar es Salaam (Tanzania) (Note: Al Hilal played their group stage home matches at Benjamin Mkapa Stadium, Dar es Salaam (Tanzania) and Benina Martyrs Stadium, Benghazi (Libya), instead of their regular home stadium Al Hilal Stadium, Omdurman, due to the 2023 Sudanese War.)
19:00 UTC+3	Meriah 8' (o.g.); Abdelrahman 15' (pen.); Khedr (yellow card) 35'; N'Diaye 78'	Report	Memmiche (yellow card) 13'; Ben Hammouda (yellow card) 23'; Sowe 59'	Stadium: Benjamin Mkapa Stadium; Referee: Issa Sy (Senegal)

9 December 2023 Matchday 3	Espérance de Tunis (Tunisia)	0–0	(Angola) Petro de Luanda	Tunis
20:00 UTC+1	Ouahabi (yellow card) 43'; Ben Ali (yellow card) 85'	Report	Azulão (yellow card) 41'; Jaredi (yellow card) 43'; Gilberto (yellow card) 51'	Stadium: Stade Hammadi Agrebi; Referee: Alhadi Allaou Mahamat (Chad)

19 December 2023 Matchday 4	Petro de Luanda (Angola)	0–0	(Tunisia) Espérance de Tunis	Luanda
17:00 UTC+1	Soares (yellow card) 45'; Toro (yellow card) 68'; Pinto (yellow card) 90+3'	Report	Ben Ali (yellow card) 68'; Ouahabi (yellow card) 90+3'	Stadium: Estádio 11 de Novembro; Referee: Dahane Beida (Mauritania)

24 February 2024 Matchday 5	Étoile du Sahel (Tunisia)	0–2	(Tunisia) Espérance de Tunis	Tunis
20:00 UTC+1		Report	Sasse 26'; El Ayeb 41'	Stadium: Stade Hammadi Agrebi; Referee: Samir Guezzaz (Morocco)

2 March 2024 Matchday 6	Espérance de Tunis (Tunisia)	1–0	(Sudan) Al Hilal	Tunis
20:00 UTC+1	Meriah 22'; Tka (yellow card) 69'	Report	Fofana (yellow card) 28'; Abaker (yellow card) 31'; N'Diaye (yellow card) 63'; Mendy (yellow card) 76'; Diaw (yellow card) 90+3'	Stadium: Stade Hammadi Agrebi; Referee: Patrice Tanguy Mebiame (Gabon)

==== Knockout stage ====
The draw of the group stage was held on 12 March 2024.

===== Quarter-finals =====
30 March 2024 First leg	Espérance de Tunis (Tunisia)	0–0	(Ivory Coast) ASEC Mimosas	Tunis
22:00 UTC+1	Aholou (yellow card) 41'	Report	Zouzou (yellow card) 45'; Bada (yellow card) 61'	Stadium: Stade Hammadi Agrebi; Referee: Peter Waweru (Kenya)

6 April 2024 Second leg	ASEC Mimosas (Ivory Coast)	0–0 (0–0 agg.) (2–4 p)	(Tunisia) Espérance de Tunis	Abidjan
20:00 UTC+0	Zadi Zokou (yellow card) 21'	Report	Sasse (yellow card) 42'; Tka (yellow card) 71'; Meriah (yellow card) 81'	Stadium: Felix Houphouet Boigny Stadium; Referee: Jean-Jacques Ndala Ngambo (DR Congo)
	Penalties
	Karidioula (penalty scored); Koffi (penalty missed); Diarrassouba (penalty missed); Pokou (penalty scored)		(penalty scored) Meriah; (penalty scored) Bouchniba; (penalty scored) Tka; (penalty scored) Tougai

===== Semi-finals =====
20 April 2024 First leg	Espérance de Tunis (Tunisia)	1–0	(South Africa) Mamelodi Sundowns	Tunis
20:00 UTC+1	Sasse 41'; Touagi (yellow card) 62'	Report	Williams (yellow card) 44'; Mudau (yellow card) 45+4'	Stadium: Stade Hammadi Agrebi; Referee: Omar Artan (Somalia)

26 April 2024 Second leg	Mamelodi Sundowns (South Africa)	0–1 (0–2 agg.)	(Tunisia) Espérance de Tunis	Pretoria
20:00 UTC+2	Allende (yellow card) 86'; Modiba (yellow card) 90+4'	Report	Bouchniba 57'; Memmiche (yellow card) 66'; Ben Ali (yellow card) 74'	Stadium: Loftus Versfeld Stadium; Referee: Issa Sy (Senegal)

===== Final =====
18 May 2024 First leg	Espérance de Tunis (Tunisia)	0–0	(Egypt) Al Ahly	Tunis
20:00 UTC+1	Aholou (yellow card) 16'; Rodrigues (yellow card) 70'	Report	Fouad (yellow card) 33'; Hany (yellow card) 39'	Stadium: Stade Hammadi Agrebi; Attendance: 35,000; Referee: Mustapha Ghorbal (Algeria)

25 May 2024 Second leg	Al Ahly (Egypt)	1–0 (1–0 agg.)	(Tunisia) Espérance de Tunis	Cairo
20:00 UTC+3	Aholou 4' (o.g.)	Report	Aholou (yellow card) 20'; Chaalali (yellow card) 86'; Ogbelu (yellow card) 86'; Ben Hamida (yellow card) 90+5'	Stadium: Cairo International Stadium; Attendance: 52,000; Referee: Jean-Jacques Ndala Ngambo (DR Congo)

=== African Football League ===
The draw of the African Football League was held on 2 September 2023.

==== Quarter-finals ====
22 October 2023 First leg	TP Mazembe (Democratic Republic of the Congo)	1–0	(Tunisia) Espérance de Tunis	Dar es Salaam (Tanzania)
18:00 UTC+3	Fofana 11'; Mondeko (yellow card) 45+2'	Report	Ben Hamida (yellow card) 90+2'	Stadium: Benjamin Mkapa Stadium; Attendance: 40,000; Referee: Mahmood Ismail (Sudan)

26 October 2023 Second leg	Espérance de Tunis (Tunisia)	3–0 (3–1 agg.)	(Democratic Republic of the Congo) TP Mazembe	Tunis
16:00 UTC+1	Ben Hamida (yellow card) 41'; Ouahabi 45'; Ghacha (yellow card) 71'; Bouguerra 76', (yellow card) 78'; Tougai 86'; Abid (yellow card) 90+7'	Report	Oladapo (yellow card) 42'; Mbaye (yellow card) 45+3'; Mondeko (yellow card) 64'; Keita (yellow card) 90'	Stadium: Stade Hammadi Agrebi; Attendance: 40,000; Referee: Abongile Tom (South Africa)

==== Semi-finals ====
29 October 2023 First leg	Wydad AC (Morocco)	1–0	(Tunisia) Espérance de Tunis	Casablanca
19:00 UTC+1	Boussefiane 58'; Ahannach (yellow card) 63'; El Motie (yellow card) 90+4'	Report	Bouchniba (yellow card) 20'; Tka (yellow card) 52'	Stadium: Stade Mohammed V Attendance: 45,000; Referee: Amin Omar (Egypt)

1 November 2023 Second leg	Espérance de Tunis (Tunisia)	1–0 (1–1 agg.) (4–5 p)	(Morocco) Wydad AC	Tunis
16:00 UTC+1	Ben Hamida (yellow card) 73'; Rodrigues 66'	Report	El Bahri (yellow card) 42'	Stadium: Stade Hammadi Agrebi; Attendance: 40,000; Referee: Peter Waweru (Kenya)
	Penalties
	Meriah (penalty scored); Rodrigues (penalty missed); Derbali (penalty scored); Bouchniba (penalty scored); Tougai (penalty scored)		(penalty scored) Jabrane; (penalty scored) El Amloud; (penalty scored) Aboulfath; (penalty scored) Ounajem; (penalty scored) Sambou

=== Arab Club Champions Cup ===
The draw of Arab Club Champions Cup was held on 6 March 2023.

==== Group stage ====
Group A

Pos	Team	Pld	W	D	L	GF	GA	GD	Pts	Qualification
1	(Saudi Arabia) Al-Ittihad Jeddah	3	3	0	0	5	2	+3	9	Advance to knockout stage
2	(Iraq) Al-Shorta	3	1	1	1	2	2	0	4	Advance to knockout stage
3	(Tunisia) Espérance de Tunis	3	0	2	1	1	2	−1	2	
4	(Tunisia) CS Sfaxien	3	0	1	2	0	2	−2	1	

Source: UAFA

27 July 2023 Matchday 1	Espérance de Tunis (Tunisia)	1–2	(Saudi Arabia) Ittihad Jeddah	Taif, Saudi Arabia
22:00 UTC+3	Bouguerra 26'	Report	Hamdallah 35'; Benzema 55'	Stadium: King Fahd Stadium; Referee: Adel Al Naqbi (United Arab Emirates)

30 July 2023 Matchday 2	Al-Shorta (Iraq)	0–0	(Tunisia) Espérance de Tunis	Taif, Saudi Arabia
18:00 UTC+3	Lucas (yellow card) 81'	Report	Iwuala (yellow card) 50'	Stadium: King Fahd Stadium; Referee: Mohammed Al-Shammari (Qatar)

2 August 2023 Matchday 3	Espérance de Tunis (Tunisia)	0–0	(Tunisia) CS Sfaxien	Al Bahah, Saudi Arabia
18:00 UTC+3	Oumarou (yellow card) 81'	Report	Zaidi (yellow card) 4'; Jerbi (yellow card) 90+6'	Stadium: King Saud Sport City Stadium; Referee: Ahmad Al Ali (Kuwait)

== Statistics ==
- ^{1} Includes African Football League and Arab Club Champions Cup.
- ^{‡} Player left the club during the season.
- ^{y} Youth team

=== Playing statistics ===
No.	Pos	Nat	Player	Total		Ligue 1		Tunisian Cup		CAF Champions League		Other^{1}	
No.	Pos	Nat	Player	Apps	Goals	Apps	Goals	Apps	Goals	Apps	Goals	Apps	Goals
1	GK	(Tunisia)	Amenallah Memmiche	37	0	18	0	0	0	13	0	6	0
2	DF	(Tunisia)	Mohamed Ben Ali	31	0	14	0	1	0	12	0	4	0
3	DF	(Tunisia)	Amenallah Majhed	2	0	1	0	1	0	0	0	0	0
4	MF	(Tunisia)	Wael Derbali	23	1	16	1	1	0	4	0	2	0
5	DF	(Tunisia)	Yassine Meriah	42	8	20	5	1	1	14	2	7	0
8	MF	(Tunisia)	Houssem Tka	39	0	18	0	0	0	14	0	7	0
9	FW	(Brazil)	Rodrigo Rodrigues	30	11	16	10	0	0	10	0	4	1
10	MF	(Brazil)	Yan Sasse	34	6	16	3	0	0	14	3	4	0
11	FW	(Tunisia)	Oussama Bouguerra	40	4	19	2	1	0	13	0	7	2
12	GK	(Tunisia)	Moez Ben Cherifia	8	0	4	0	1	0	1	0	2	0
13	DF	(Tunisia)	Raed Bouchniba	32	1	15	0	1	0	11	1	5	0
15	DF	(Algeria)	Mohamed Amine Tougai	36	2	15	0	0	0	14	1	7	1
17	FW	(Tunisia)	Zied Berrima	5	0	2	0	0	0	0	0	3	0
18	FW	(Algeria)	Houssam Ghacha	32	2	13	2	0	0	13	0	6	0
20	DF	(Tunisia)	Mohamed Amine Ben Hamida	36	0	17	0	0	0	14	0	5	0
21	FW	(Tunisia)	Aziz Abid	4	0	3	0	0	0	0	0	1	0
22	DF	(Tunisia)	Hani Amamou	13	0	8	0	1	0	1	0	3	0
23	MF	(Tunisia)	Ghaith Ouahabi	22	1	10	0	1	0	6	0	5	1
24	FW	(France)	Bilel Sahli	11	0	7	0	0	0	4	0	0	0
25	MF	(Tunisia)	Ghailene Chaalali	20	0	12	0	0	0	8	0	0	0
26	GK	(Tunisia)	Mohamed Sedki Debchi	0	0	0	0	0	0	0	0	0	0
27	FW	(The Gambia)	Kebba Sowe	20	3	11	2	0	0	5	1	4	0
29	FW	(Tunisia)	Mohamed Ali Ben Hammouda	26	0	9	0	1	0	11	0	5	0
30	DF	(Tunisia)	Oussama Shili	9	0	6	0	1	0	0	0	2	0
31	MF	(Tunisia)	Zakaria El Ayeb	33	3	21	2	1	0	9	1	2	0
32	MF	(Tunisia)	Montassar Triki	1	0	0	0	1	0	0	0	0	0
36	MF	(Nigeria)	Onuche Ogbelu	20	0	8	0	0	0	9	0	3	0
37	FW	(Democratic Republic of the Congo)	André Bukia	12	0	7	0	0	0	5	0	0	0
38	MF	(Togo)	Roger Aholou	17	0	9	0	0	0	8	0	0	0
y	FW	(Tunisia)	Salmen Trabelsi	3	0	3	0	0	0	0	0	0	0
y	DF	(Tunisia)	Koussay Smiri	2	0	1	0	1	0	0	0	0	0
y	FW	(Tunisia)	Zinedine Kada	2	0	1	0	1	0	0	0	0	0
y	FW	(Tunisia)	Amenallah Frikhi	1	0	0	0	1	0	0	0	0	0
y	MF	(Tunisia)	Khairi Meddaoui	1	0	0	0	1	0	0	0	0	0
‡	FW	(Nigeria)	Anayo Iwuala	3	0	0	0	0	0	0	0	3	0
‡	MF	(Morocco)	Sabir Bougrine	2	0	0	0	0	0	0	0	2	0
‡	FW	(Tunisia)	Rayen Hamrouni	1	0	1	0	0	0	0	0	0	0
‡	FW	(Tunisia)	Achref Jabri	1	0	1	0	0	0	0	0	0	0
‡	MF	(Tunisia)	Khalil Guenichi	1	0	1	0	0	0	0	0	0	0
‡	FW	(Jordan)	Sharara	4	0	1	0	0	0	0	0	3	0
‡	FW	(Tunisia)	Farouk Mimouni	1	0	1	0	0	0	0	0	0	0
‡	MF	(Tunisia)	Mootez Zaddem	8	1	5	1	0	0	0	0	3	0
‡	MF	(Niger)	Youssouf Oumarou	9	2	5	2	0	0	1	0	3	0

Source: TarajiZone

=== Goals ===
Rank	No.	Pos	Nat	Player	Ligue 1	Tunisian Cup	CAF Champions League	Other^{1}	Total
1	9	FW	(Brazil)	Rodrigo Rodrigues	10	0	0	1	11
2	5	DF	(Tunisia)	Yassine Meriah	5	1	2	0	8
3	10	MF	(Brazil)	Yan Sasse	3	0	3	0	6
4	11	FW	(Tunisia)	Oussama Bouguerra	2	0	0	2	4
5	27	FW	(The Gambia)	Kebba Sowe	2	0	1	0	3
5	31	MF	(Tunisia)	Zakaria El Ayeb	2	0	1	0	3
7	15	DF	(Algeria)	Mohamed Amine Tougai	0	0	1	1	2
7	‡	MF	(Niger)	Youssouf Oumarou	2	0	0	0	2
7	18	FW	(Algeria)	Houssam Ghacha	2	0	0	0	2
10	23	MF	(Tunisia)	Ghaith Ouahabi	0	0	0	1	1
10	‡	MF	(Tunisia)	Mootez Zaddem	1	0	0	0	1
10	4	MF	(Tunisia)	Wael Derbali	1	0	0	0	1
10	13	DF	(Tunisia)	Raed Bouchniba	0	0	1	0	1
Own goals					3	0	0	0	3
Total					33	1	9	5	48

=== Assists ===
Rank	No.	Pos	Nat	Player	Ligue 1	Tunisian Cup	CAF Champions League	Other^{1}	Total
1	10	MF	(Brazil)	Yan Sasse	5	0	1	2	8
2	2	DF	(Tunisia)	Mohamed Ben Ali	4	0	0	0	4
2	8	MF	(Tunisia)	Houssem Tka	2	0	1	1	4
4	11	FW	(Tunisia)	Oussama Bouguerra	2	0	0	1	3
4	9	FW	(Brazil)	Rodrigo Rodrigues	1	0	2	0	3
6	18	FW	(Algeria)	Houssam Ghacha	2	0	0	0	2
6	20	DF	(Tunisia)	Mohamed Amine Ben Hamida	2	0	0	0	2
6	13	DF	(Tunisia)	Raed Bouchniba	2	0	0	0	2
9	4	MF	(Tunisia)	Wael Derbali	1	0	0	0	1
9	25	MF	(Tunisia)	Ghailene Chaalali	1	0	0	0	1
Total					22	0	4	4	30

=== Cleansheets ===
Rank	No.	Nat	Player	Ligue 1	Tunisian Cup	CAF Champions League	Other^{1}	Total
1	1	(Tunisia)	Amenallah Memmiche	9	0	11	3.5	23.5
2	12	(Tunisia)	Moez Ben Cherifia	3	0	1	0.5	4.5
Total				12	0	12	4	28

=== Disciplinary record ===
N	P	Nat.	Name	Ligue 1			Tunisian Cup			CAF Champions League			Other^{1}			Total			Notes
N	P	Nat.	Name	Yellow card	Second yellow card	Red card	Yellow card	Second yellow card	Red card	Yellow card	Second yellow card	Red card	Yellow card	Second yellow card	Red card	Yellow card	Second yellow card	Red card	Notes
15	DF	(Algeria)	Mohamed Amine Tougai	2		1				2						4		1	
y	FW	(Tunisia)	Amenallah Frikhi						1									1	
22	DF	(Tunisia)	Hani Amamou						1									1	
38	MF	(Togo)	Roger Aholou	2	1					3						5	1		
20	DF	(Tunisia)	Mohamed Amine Ben Hamida	3						1			3			7			
10	MF	(Brazil)	Yan Sasse	5						1						6			
2	DF	(Tunisia)	Mohamed Ben Ali	2						4						6			
11	FW	(Tunisia)	Oussama Bouguerra	3						1			1			5			
1	GK	(Tunisia)	Amenallah Memmiche	3						2						5			
8	MF	(Tunisia)	Houssem Tka							3			1			4			
5	DF	(Tunisia)	Yassine Meriah	2						2						4			
25	MF	(Tunisia)	Ghailene Chaalali	3						1						4			
13	DF	(Tunisia)	Raed Bouchniba	1			1						1			3			
9	FW	(Brazil)	Rodrigo Rodrigues	2						1						3			
36	MF	(Nigeria)	Onuche Ogbelu	2						1						3			
‡	MF	(Niger)	Youssouf Oumarou							1			1			2			
29	FW	(Tunisia)	Mohamed Ali Ben Hammouda							2						2			
31	MF	(Tunisia)	Zakaria El Ayeb	2												2			
‡	FW	(Nigeria)	Anayo Iwuala										1			1			
12	GK	(Tunisia)	Moez Ben Cherifia							1						1			
18	FW	(Algeria)	Houssam Ghacha										1			1			
21	FW	(Tunisia)	Aziz Abid										1			1			
24	FW	(France)	Bilel Sahli	1												1			
4	MF	(Tunisia)	Wael Derbali	1												1			

Source: TarajiZone
Ordered by (red card) , (second yellow card) and (yellow card)
(yellow card) = Number of bookings; (second yellow card) = Number of sending offs after a second yellow card; (red card) = Number of sending offs by a direct red card.
