= 2024 CAF Champions League final =

African football tournament final

- Event: 2023–24 CAF Champions League
Espérance de Tunis	Al Ahly
(Tunisia)	(Egypt)
0	1

First leg
Espérance de Tunis	Al Ahly
0	0
- Date: 18 May 2024
- Venue: Stade Hammadi Agrebi, Tunis
- Referee: Mustapha Ghorbal (Algeria)
- Attendance: 35,000
- Weather: Partially covered 24 °C (75 °F); 64% humidity

Second leg
Al Ahly	Espérance de Tunis
1	0
- Date: 25 May 2024
- Venue: Cairo International Stadium, Cairo
- Referee: Jean-Jacques Ndala (DR Congo)
- Attendance: 52,000
- Weather: Clear weather with some clouds 29 °C (84 °F); 26% humidity

The 2024 CAF Champions League final were the final matches of the 2023–24 CAF Champions League, the 60th edition of Africa's premier club football tournament organized by the Confederation of African Football (CAF), and the 28th edition under the current CAF Champions League title.

The contesting teams, Espérance de Tunis and Al Ahly, previously contested each other at the 2018 final, with either one of those teams also reaching the final in every edition of the CAF Champions League since 2017.

== Teams ==
In the following table, finals until 1996 were in the African Cup of Champions Club era, since 1997 were in the CAF Champions League era.

Team	Zone	Previous finals appearances (bold indicates winners)
(Tunisia) Espérance de Tunis	UNAF (North Africa)	8 (**1994**, 1999, 2000, 2010, **2011**, 2012, **2018**, **2019**)
(Egypt) Al Ahly	UNAF (North Africa)	16 (**1982**, 1983, **1987**, **2001**, **2005**, **2006**, 2007, **2008**, **2012**, **2013**, 2017, 2018, **2020**, **2021**, 2022, **2023**)

== Venues ==
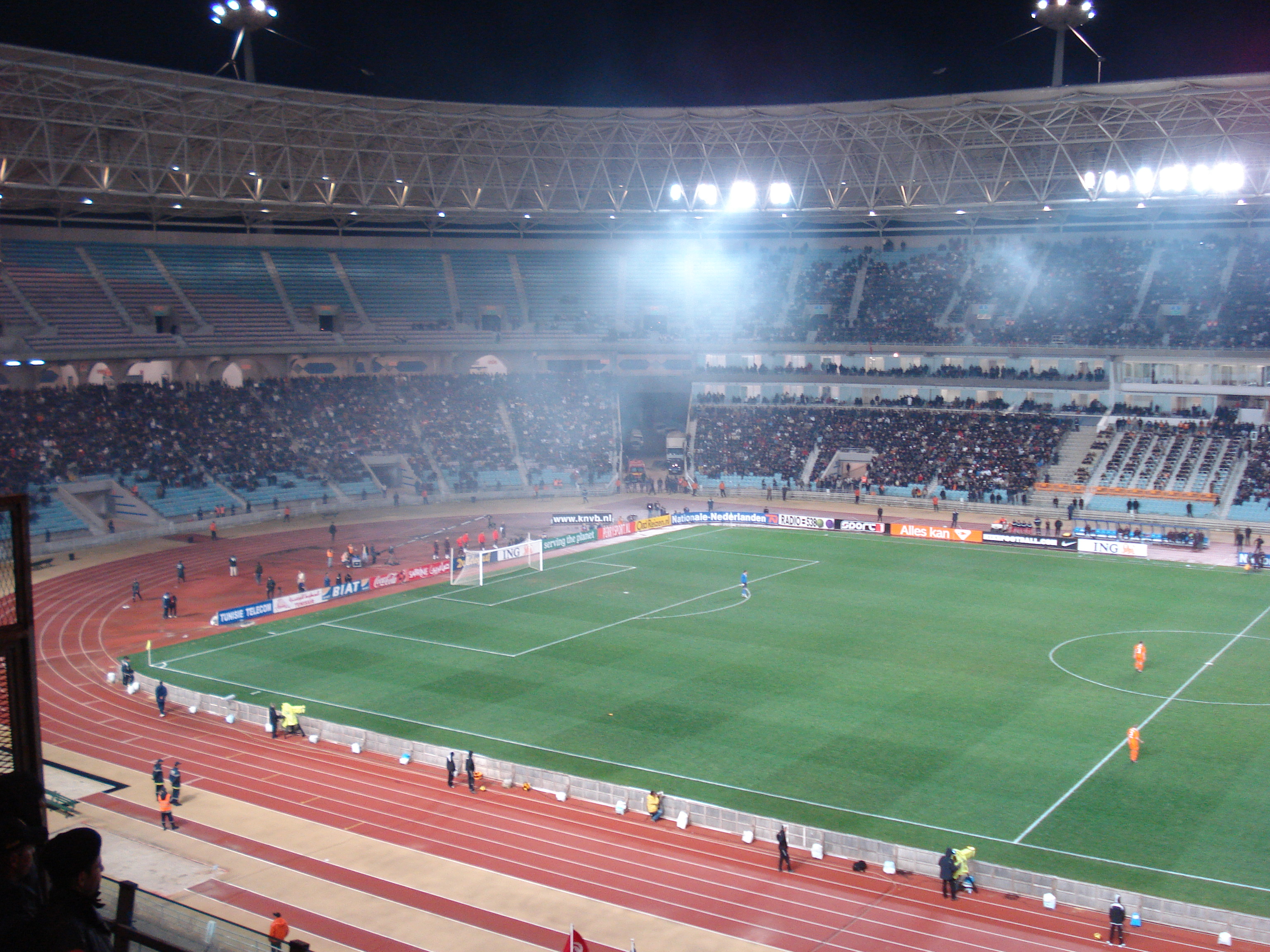
Hammadi Agrebi Stadium in Tunis, Tunisia, hosted the first leg.

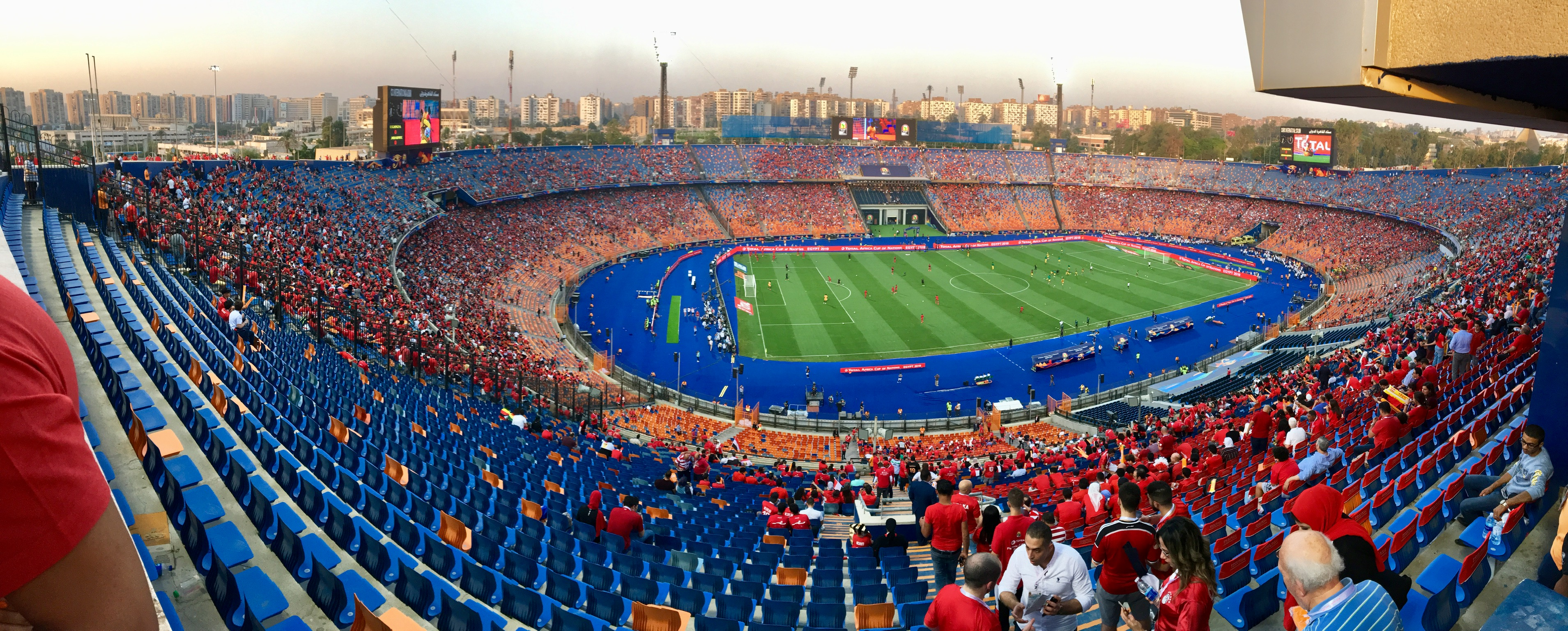
Cairo International Stadium in Cairo, Egypt, hosted the second leg.

== Road to the final ==
Note: In all results below, the score of the finalist is given first (H: home; A: away).

(Tunisia) Espérance de Tunis				Round	(Egypt) Al Ahly			
Opponent	Agg	1st leg	2nd leg	Qualifying rounds	Opponent	Agg	1st leg	2nd leg
Bye				First round	Bye			
AS Douanes Burkina Faso	1–0	1–0 (A)	0–0 (H)	Second round	(Ethiopia) Saint George	7–0	3–0 (A)	4–0 (H)
Opponent	Result			Group stage	Opponent	Result		
(Tunisia) Étoile du Sahel	2–0 (H)			Matchday 1	(Ghana) Medeama	3–0 (H)		
(Sudan) Al Hilal	1–3 (A)			Matchday 2	(Tanzania) Young Africans	1–1 (A)		
(Angola) Petro de Luanda	0–0 (H)			Matchday 3	(Algeria) CR Belouizdad	0–0 (H)		
(Angola) Petro de Luanda	0–0 (A)			Matchday 4	(Algeria) CR Belouizdad	0–0 (A)		
(Tunisia) Étoile du Sahel	2–0 (A)			Matchday 5	(Ghana) Medeama	1–0 (A)		
(Sudan) Al Hilal	1–0 (H)			Matchday 6	(Tanzania) Young Africans	1–0 (H)		
**Group C runners-up**: Pos / Team / Pld / Pts; 1 / (Angola) Petro de Luanda / 6 / **12**; **2** / (Tunisia) Espérance de Tunis / **6** / **11**; 3 / (Sudan) Al Hilal / 6 / **5**; 4 / (Tunisia) Étoile du Sahel / 6 / **4**; Source: CAF				Final standings	**Group D winners**: Pos / Team / Pld / Pts; **1** / (Egypt) Al Ahly / **6** / **12**; 2 / (Tanzania) Young Africans / 6 / **8**; 3 / (Algeria) CR Belouizdad / 6 / **8**; 4 / (Ghana) Medeama / 6 / **4**; Source: CAF			
Opponent	Agg	1st leg	2nd leg	Knockout stage	Opponent	Agg	1st leg	2nd leg
(Ivory Coast) ASEC Mimosas	0–0 (4–2 p)	0–0 (H)	0–0 (A)	Quarter-finals	(Tanzania) Simba	3–0	1–0 (A)	2–0 (H)
(South Africa) Mamelodi Sundowns	2–0	1–0 (H)	1–0 (A)	Semi-finals	(Democratic Republic of the Congo) TP Mazembe	3–0	0–0 (A)	3–0 (H)

== Format ==
The final was played on a home-and-away two-legged basis.

If the aggregate score was tied after the second leg, the away goals rule was applied, and if still tied, extra time was played, and a penalty shoot-out was used to determine the winner.

== Matches ==
=== First leg ===
==== Details ====
18 May 2024
20:00 UTC+1

Espérance de Tunis (Tunisia)	0–0	(Egypt) Al Ahly
	Report

Stade Hammadi Agrebi, Tunis
Attendance: 35,000
Referee: Mustapha Ghorbal (Algeria)

**Espérance de Tunis**	**Al Ahly**

GK	1	(Tunisia) Amenallah Memmiche
DF	2	(Tunisia) Mohamed Ben Ali		(substituted off) 69'
DF	5	(Tunisia) Yassine Meriah
DF	15	(Algeria) Mohamed Amine Tougai
DF	20	(Tunisia) Mohamed Amine Ben Hamida		(substituted off) 90+2'
MF	8	(Tunisia) Houssem Tka		(substituted off) 69'
MF	25	(Tunisia) Ghailene Chaalali (c)
MF	38	(Togo) Roger Aholou	(yellow card) 16'
FW	10	(Brazil) Yan Sasse		(substituted off) 82'
FW	18	(Algeria) Houssam Ghacha
FW	9	(Brazil) Rodrigo Rodrigues	(yellow card) 70'	(substituted off) 90+2'
Substitutes:
GK	12	(Tunisia) Moez Ben Cherifia
DF	13	(Tunisia) Raed Bouchniba		(substituted on) 69'
DF	22	(Tunisia) Hani Amamou
MF	31	(Tunisia) Zakaria El Ayeb		(substituted on) 69'
MF	36	(Nigeria) Onuche Ogbelu		(substituted on) 90+2'
FW	11	(Tunisia) Oussama Bouguerra		(substituted on) 82'
FW	27	(The Gambia) Kebba Sowe
FW	29	(Tunisia) Mohamed Ali Ben Hammouda		(substituted on) 90+2'
FW	37	(Democratic Republic of the Congo) André Bukia
Manager:
(Portugal) Miguel Cardoso

GK	31	(Egypt) Mostafa Shobeir
DF	5	(Egypt) Ramy Rabia (c)
DF	21	(Tunisia) Ali Maâloul		(substituted off) 7'
DF	24	(Egypt) Mohamed Abdelmonem
DF	30	(Egypt) Mohamed Hany	(yellow card) 39'
MF	8	(Egypt) Akram Tawfik
MF	13	(Egypt) Marwan Attia
MF	22	(Egypt) Emam Ashour		(substituted off) 81'
FW	10	(South Africa) Percy Tau		(substituted off) 81'
FW	14	(Egypt) Hussein El Shahat
FW	39	(Palestine) Wessam Abou Ali
Substitutes:
GK	1	(Egypt) Mohamed El Shenawy
DF	4	(Egypt) Mahmoud Metwalli
DF	6	(Egypt) Yasser Ibrahim
DF	28	(Egypt) Karim Fouad	(yellow card) 33'	(substituted on) 7'
MF	15	(Mali) Aliou Dieng
MF	19	(Egypt) Mohamed Magdy Afsha		(substituted on) 81'
FW	7	(Egypt) Mahmoud Kahraba
FW	12	(Morocco) Reda Slim		(substituted on) 81'
FW	27	(France) Anthony Modeste
Manager:
(Switzerland) Marcel Koller

Assistant referees:
Mokrane Gourari (Algeria)
Abbes Akram Zerhouni (Algeria)
Fourth official:
Ibrahim Mutaz (Libya)
Video assistant referee:
Dahane Beida (Mauritania)
Assistant video assistant referees:
Salima Mukansanga (Rwanda)
Jerson Dos Santos (Angola)

**Match rules**
- 90 minutes.
- Nine named substitutes, of which up to five may be used. (Note: Each team was only given three opportunities to make substitutions, excluding substitutions made at half-time.)

==== Statistics ====
First half
Statistic	Espérance de Tunis	Al Ahly
Goals scored	0	0
Total shots	5	2
Shots on target	0	0
Saves	0	0
Ball possession	55%	45%
Corner kicks	0	1
Offsides	1	0
Yellow cards	1	2
Red cards	0	0

Second half
Statistic	Espérance de Tunis	Al Ahly
Goals scored	0	0
Total shots	5	8
Shots on target	0	1
Saves	1	0
Ball possession	49%	51%
Corner kicks	0	2
Offsides	1	1
Yellow cards	1	0
Red cards	0	0

Overall
Statistic	Espérance de Tunis	Al Ahly
Goals scored	0	0
Total shots	10	10
Shots on target	0	1
Saves	1	0
Ball possession	52%	48%
Corner kicks	0	3
Offsides	2	1
Yellow cards	2	2
Red cards	0	0

=== Second leg ===
==== Details ====
25 May 2024
20:00 UTC+3

Al Ahly (Egypt)	1–0	(Tunisia) Espérance de Tunis
Aholou 4' (o.g.)	Report

Cairo International Stadium, Cairo
Attendance: 52,000
Referee: Jean-Jacques Ndala (DR Congo)

**Al Ahly**	**Espérance de Tunis**

GK	31	(Egypt) Mostafa Shobeir
DF	5	(Egypt) Ramy Rabia (c)
DF	24	(Egypt) Mohamed Abdelmonem
DF	28	(Egypt) Karim Fouad
DF	30	(Egypt) Mohamed Hany
MF	8	(Egypt) Akram Tawfik
MF	13	(Egypt) Marwan Attia	(substituted off) 78'
MF	22	(Egypt) Emam Ashour	(substituted off) 90+2'
FW	10	(South Africa) Percy Tau	(substituted off) 67'
FW	14	(Egypt) Hussein El Shahat	(substituted off) 90+2'
FW	39	(Palestine) Wessam Abou Ali	(substituted off) 78'
Substitutes:
GK	1	(Egypt) Mohamed El Shenawy
DF	6	(Egypt) Yasser Ibrahim	(substituted on) 90+2'
MF	11	(Egypt) Ahmed Abdel Kader
MF	15	(Mali) Aliou Dieng	(substituted on) 67'
MF	19	(Egypt) Mohamed Magdy Afsha	(substituted on) 78'
FW	7	(Egypt) Mahmoud Kahraba	(substituted on) 78'
FW	12	(Morocco) Reda Slim
FW	27	(France) Anthony Modeste
FW	29	(Egypt) Taher Mohamed	(substituted on) 90+2'
Manager:
(Switzerland) Marcel Koller

GK	1	(Tunisia) Amenallah Memmiche
DF	2	(Tunisia) Mohamed Ben Ali		(substituted off) 45'
DF	5	(Tunisia) Yassine Meriah
DF	15	(Algeria) Mohamed Amine Tougai
DF	20	(Tunisia) Mohamed Amine Ben Hamida	(yellow card) 90+5'
MF	8	(Tunisia) Houssem Tka		(substituted off) 76'
MF	25	(Tunisia) Ghailene Chaalali (c)	(yellow card) 86'
MF	38	(Togo) Roger Aholou	(yellow card) 20'	(substituted off) 85'
FW	10	(Brazil) Yan Sasse		(substituted off) 85'
FW	18	(Algeria) Houssam Ghacha		(substituted off) 75'
FW	9	(Brazil) Rodrigo Rodrigues
Substitutes:
GK	12	(Tunisia) Moez Ben Cherifia
DF	13	(Tunisia) Raed Bouchniba		(substituted on) 45'
DF	22	(Tunisia) Hani Amamou
MF	23	(Tunisia) Ghaith Ouahabi
MF	31	(Tunisia) Zakaria El Ayeb
MF	36	(Nigeria) Onuche Ogbelu	(yellow card) 86'	(substituted on) 76'
FW	11	(Tunisia) Oussama Bouguerra		(substituted on) 85'
FW	29	(Tunisia) Mohamed Ali Ben Hammouda		(substituted on) 85'
FW	37	(Democratic Republic of the Congo) André Bukia		(substituted on) 75'
Manager:
(Portugal) Miguel Cardoso			(yellow card) 90+4'

Assistant referees:
Souru Phatsoane (Lesotho)
Seydou Tiama (Burkina Faso)
Fourth official:
Alhadi Allaou Mahamat (Chad)
Video assistant referee:
Lahlou Benbraham (Algeria)
Assistant video assistant referees:
Daniel Nii Laryea (Ghana)
Mohamed Abdallah Ibrahim (Sudan)

**Match rules**
- 90 minutes.
- Penalty shoot-out if tied on aggregate and away goals.
- Nine named substitutes, of which up to five may be used.

==== Statistics ====
First half
Statistic	Al Ahly	Espérance de Tunis
Goals scored	1	0
Total shots	7	0
Shots on target	1	0
Saves	0	0
Ball possession	51%	49%
Corner kicks	4	0
Offsides	0	0
Yellow cards	0	1
Red cards	0	0

Second half
Statistic	Al Ahly	Espérance de Tunis
Goals scored	0	0
Total shots	4	5
Shots on target	1	1
Saves	1	1
Ball possession	31%	69%
Corner kicks	3	1
Offsides	0	0
Yellow cards	0	3
Red cards	0	0

Overall
Statistic	Al Ahly	Espérance de Tunis
Goals scored	1	0
Total shots	11	5
Shots on target	2	1
Saves	1	1
Ball possession	41%	59%
Corner kicks	7	1
Offsides	0	0
Yellow cards	0	4
Red cards	0	0

== See also ==
- 2024 CAF Confederation Cup final
- 2024 CAF Super Cup
