= Espérance de Tunis–Étoile du Sahel rivalry =

Football rivalry in Tunisia

Tunisian Classico
- Location: Tunisia (Tunis and Sousse), Africa
- Teams: Espérance de Tunis; Étoile du Sahel
- Latest meeting: Espérance de Tunis 3–2 Étoile du Sahel; Ligue 1 (23 August 2026)
- Broadcasters: Télévision Tunisienne 1 Al Kass Sports
- Stadiums: Stade Hammadi Agrebi: Espérance de Tunis; Stade Olympique de Sousse: Étoile du Sahel

Statistics
- Total meetings: 205
- Most wins: Espérance de Tunis (85)
- All-time series: Espérance de Tunis: 85; Drawn: 58; Étoile du Sahel: 62
- Largest victory: Étoile du Sahel 5–1 Espérance de Tunis; Ligue 1 (9 January 2011)

The Tunisian Classico is the name given to matches between Espérance de Tunis and Étoile du Sahel football clubs from Tunis and Sousse, Tunisia.

== History ==
Called in Tunisia Clasico on the model of the Spanish El Clásico between Real Madrid and Barcelona. It is one of the most important rivalries in Tunisian football. They are considered the most crowned titles in Tunisia, with a total of 102 titles, 17 of which are continental titles. The two teams met for the first time in the 1944–45. Their first match ended in a 0–0 draw. Since then, they have played their matches regularly, with the exception of the 1961–62 season, when Étoile du Sahel was disbanded. The two teams met in the Tunisian Cup final five times. The first was in 1957 and ended with the victory of Espérance de Tunis, For the first time two teams from Tunisia have met in a continental competition in the group stage of the 2005 CAF Champions League and in both matches they ended in a draw, the two teams were both champions and runners-up in the same season seventeen times, including five consecutive times between 1999–2000 and 2003–04.

== All-time head-to-head results ==
As of 4 April 2026

Tournament	GP	ETV	D	ESV
Before 1956	16	7	4	5
Ligue Professionnelle 1	140	57	45	38
Tunisian Cup	26	12	3	11
Tunisian Super Cup	1	0	1	0
Champions League	10	7	3	0
Confederation Cup	6	0	1	5
TOTAL	199	83	57	59

GP: Games Played
ETV: Espérance de Tunis Victory
D: Draw
ESV: Étoile du Sahel Victory

== All-Time Top Scorers ==
Player	Club	Ligue 1	Tunisian Cup	International	Total
(Tunisia) Taha Yassine Khenissi	Espérance de Tunis	5	1	—	6
(Nigeria) Michael Eneramo	Espérance de Tunis	3	—	—	3

== Honours ==
Espérance de Tunis	Championship	Étoile du Sahel
International (Official)
4	CAF Champions League	1
—	CAF Confederation Cup	2
1	CAF Super Cup	2
1	African Cup Winners' Cup (Defunct)	2
1	CAF Cup (Defunct)	2
1	Afro-Asian Club Championship (Defunct)	—
8	Aggregate	9
Domestic (Official)
34	Tunisian Ligue Professionnelle 1	11
17	Tunisian Cup	10
8	Tunisian Super Cup	3
—	League Cup (Defunct)	1
58	Aggregate	25
International (Defunct and Non-official)
—	Maghreb Champions Cup (Defunct)	1
—	Maghreb Cup Winners Cup (Defunct)	1
0	Aggregate	2
International (Non-official)
3	Arab Champions League	1
1	Arab Super Cup (Defunct)	—
4	Aggregate	1
70	Total Aggregate	37

== League matches ==
#	Date	Home team	Score	Away team	Goals (home)	Goals (away)
1	7 November 1982	Espérance de Tunis	1 – 0	Étoile du Sahel	Lassaad 68'	—
1	6 March 1983	Étoile du Sahel	2 – 1	Espérance de Tunis	Hsoumi 75' (pen.), Ben Fattoum 88'	Dhiab 89' (pen.)
85	3 October 1999	Espérance de Tunis	3 – 1	Étoile du Sahel		
86	11 May 2000	Étoile du Sahel	0 – 0	Espérance de Tunis	—	—
87	14 October 2000	Étoile du Sahel	0 – 0	Espérance de Tunis	—	—
88	10 March 2001	Espérance de Tunis	2 – 1	Étoile du Sahel		
89	23 December 2001	Étoile du Sahel	2 – 0	Espérance de Tunis		—
90	20 April 2002	Espérance de Tunis	3 – 2	Étoile du Sahel	Traoré 40', Melki 42', 63'	Jaziri 44', Sané 90'
91	28 September 2002	Espérance de Tunis	2 – 1	Étoile du Sahel		
92	23 February 2003	Étoile du Sahel	0 – 0	Espérance de Tunis	—	—
93	23 November 2003	Espérance de Tunis	1 – 0	Étoile du Sahel		—
94	12 June 2004	Étoile du Sahel	2 – 1	Espérance de Tunis		
95	2 October 2004	Espérance de Tunis	0 – 0	Étoile du Sahel	—	—
96	20 February 2005	Étoile du Sahel	0 – 0	Espérance de Tunis	—	—
97	27 November 2005	Espérance de Tunis	1 – 2	Étoile du Sahel		
98	16 April 2006	Étoile du Sahel	2 – 1	Espérance de Tunis		
99	18 October 2006	Espérance de Tunis	1 – 0	Étoile du Sahel		—
100	31 March 2007	Étoile du Sahel	3 – 1	Espérance de Tunis	Ben Frej 2', Ogunbiyi 39', Gelson Silva 61'	Zaiem 83'
101	9 March 2008	Espérance de Tunis	0 – 2	Étoile du Sahel	—	
102	22 May 2008	Étoile du Sahel	1 – 0	Espérance de Tunis		—
103	20 December 2008	Étoile du Sahel	0 – 1	Espérance de Tunis	—	Eneramo 46'
104	13 May 2009	Espérance de Tunis	4 – 1	Étoile du Sahel	Darragi 23', Eneramo 42', 48', Ntsama 75'	Bukari 71'
105	27 September 2009	Étoile du Sahel	0 – 1	Espérance de Tunis	—	Chemmam 18'
106	13 March 2010	Espérance de Tunis	0 – 0	Étoile du Sahel	—	—
107	23 July 2010	Espérance de Tunis	0 – 0	Étoile du Sahel	—	—
108	9 January 2011	Étoile du Sahel	5 – 1	Espérance de Tunis	Bueno 12', Santos 45', Jaziri 54', Abdennour 79', Diarra 85'	Ayari 54'
109	7 March 2012	Espérance de Tunis	1 – 0	Étoile du Sahel	N'Djeng 45+3'	—
110	24 June 2012	Étoile du Sahel	0 – 2	Espérance de Tunis	—	Chemmam 73', Aouadhi 88'
111	15 May 2013	Étoile du Sahel	1 – 0	Espérance de Tunis	Belakhal 90+7'	—
112	29 May 2013	Espérance de Tunis	2 – 1	Étoile du Sahel	Belaïli 46', Derbali 75'	Dramé 5'
113	29 September 2013	Espérance de Tunis	2 – 2	Étoile du Sahel	Msakni 65', Akaichi 86'	Brigui 23', Dramé 31'
114	5 February 2014	Étoile du Sahel	0 – 0	Espérance de Tunis	—	—
115	9 November 2014	Espérance de Tunis	1 – 0	Étoile du Sahel	Chaalali 71'	—
116	23 April 2015	Étoile du Sahel	1 – 1	Espérance de Tunis	Mouihbi 26' (pen.)	Jouini 46' (pen.)
117	24 December 2015	Étoile du Sahel	3 – 0	Espérance de Tunis	Lahmar 30' (pen.), 35', Akaichi 53'	—
118	25 May 2016	Espérance de Tunis	2 – 2	Étoile du Sahel	Bguir 30', Khenissi 52'	Lahmar 55' (pen.), 78'
119	9 April 2017	Étoile du Sahel	1 – 1	Espérance de Tunis	Diogo Acosta 68'	Khenissi 59'
120	18 May 2017	Espérance de Tunis	3 – 0	Étoile du Sahel	Chaalali 13', Machani 30', Khenissi 49'	—
121	26 November 2017	Étoile du Sahel	0 – 0	Espérance de Tunis	—	—
122	15 February 2018	Espérance de Tunis	3 – 2	Étoile du Sahel	Belaïli 17', Khenissi 85' (pen.), Jouini 90+11'	Talbi 36' (o.g.), Bangoura 44'
123	28 November 2018	Espérance de Tunis	0 – 0	Étoile du Sahel	—	—
124	18 May 2019	Étoile du Sahel	0 – 0	Espérance de Tunis	—	—
125	15 January 2020	Espérance de Tunis	1 – 0	Étoile du Sahel	Elhouni 32'	—
126	15 August 2020	Étoile du Sahel	1 – 1	Espérance de Tunis	Aribi 19'	Khenissi 90+3'
127	1 January 2021	Espérance de Tunis	2 – 0	Étoile du Sahel	Marzouki 28', Chaalali 90+3'	—
128	13 March 2021	Étoile du Sahel	2 – 0	Espérance de Tunis	Sfaxi 4', Ben Ouanes 51'	—
129	15 May 2022	Espérance de Tunis	1 – 0	Étoile du Sahel	Bouazra 12' (o.g.)	—
130	23 June 2022	Étoile du Sahel	1 – 1	Espérance de Tunis	Benayada 75' (pen.)	Ben Hammouda 23'
131	12 January 2023	Espérance de Tunis	2 – 0	Étoile du Sahel	Ben Romdhane 8', 90'	—
132	30 January 2023	Étoile du Sahel	1 – 2	Espérance de Tunis	Jaziri 79'	Badri 42', Ouahabi 86'
133	25 April 2023	Espérance de Tunis	1 – 0	Étoile du Sahel	Benayad 59'	—
134	10 June 2023	Étoile du Sahel	0 – 0	Espérance de Tunis	—	—
135	8 March 2024	Étoile du Sahel	0 – 1	Espérance de Tunis	—	Rodrigues 80'
136	12 May 2024	Espérance de Tunis	3 – 2	Étoile du Sahel	Rodrigues 18', Ghacha 59', Meriah 85' (pen.)	Aouani 13', Barhoumi 68'
137	3 November 2024	Étoile du Sahel	0 – 2	Espérance de Tunis	—	Boughattas 63' (o.g.), Mokwana 88'
138	26 February 2025	Espérance de Tunis	3 – 0	Étoile du Sahel	Belaïli 14', Jelassi 29', Bouchniba 47'	—
139	5 October 2025	Espérance de Tunis	1 – 0	Étoile du Sahel	Sasse 27'	—
140	4 April 2026	Étoile du Sahel	0 – 0	Espérance de Tunis	—	—
141	23 August 2026	Espérance de Tunis	3 – 2	Étoile du Sahel	Belhadj Mahmoud 15', Hadj Ali 75', 82'	Ben Dhiaf 53' (pen.), Abid 60'
142	6–7 February 2027	Étoile du Sahel	—	Espérance de Tunis	—	—

== Tunisian Cup results ==
#	Date	Round	Home team	Score	Away team	Goals (home)	Goals (away)
1	31 March 1957	Final	Espérance de Tunis	2 – 1	Étoile du Sahel		
2	1958	Quarter-finals	Étoile du Sahel	2 – 0	Espérance de Tunis		—
3	1 May 1959	Final	Étoile du Sahel	2 – 2	Espérance de Tunis		
4	31 May 1959	Replay	Étoile du Sahel	3 – 2	Espérance de Tunis		
5	8 January 1960	Round of 32	Étoile du Sahel	2 – 1	Espérance de Tunis		
6	1961	Quarter-finals	Espérance de Tunis	2 – 0	Étoile du Sahel		—
7	9 December 1962	Round of 32	Étoile du Sahel	1 – 0	Espérance de Tunis		—
8	16 May 1971	Semi-finals	Espérance de Tunis	0 – 0	Étoile du Sahel	—	—
9	21 May 1971	Replay	Étoile du Sahel	1 – 1	Espérance de Tunis		
10	1974	SF 1st leg	Espérance de Tunis	1 – 1	Étoile du Sahel		
11	1974	SF 2nd leg	Étoile du Sahel	4 – 2	Espérance de Tunis		
12	19 January 1975	Round of 16	Étoile du Sahel	2 – 0	Espérance de Tunis		—
13	19 January 1986	Round of 32	Étoile du Sahel	0 – 2	Espérance de Tunis	—	
14	10 December 1989	Semi-finals	Étoile du Sahel	0 – 1	Espérance de Tunis	—	
15	8 December 1991	Final	Espérance de Tunis	2 – 1	Étoile du Sahel	Ali Ben Neji 27' (pen.), Khalil Berbeche 66'	Riadh Amara 16'
16	19 June 1994	Semi-finals	Étoile du Sahel	1 – 0	Espérance de Tunis		—
17	30 June 1996	Semi-finals	Étoile du Sahel	2 – 0	Espérance de Tunis		—
18	20 June 2001	Semi-finals	Étoile du Sahel	1 – 1 (pen. 7–6)	Espérance de Tunis		
19	2 March 2003	Quarter-finals	Espérance de Tunis	1 – 0	Étoile du Sahel		—
20	5 November 2004	Semi-finals	Espérance de Tunis	0 – 0 (pen. 4–3)	Étoile du Sahel	—	—
21	27 February 2005	Round of 16	Espérance de Tunis	1 – 1 (pen. 4–3)	Étoile du Sahel		
22	6 July 2008	Final	Espérance de Tunis	2 – 1	Étoile du Sahel	Aboucherouane 12', 79'	Meriah 17'
23	15 April 2009	Quarter-finals	Espérance de Tunis	1 – 0	Étoile du Sahel	Bouazzi 45+1'	—
24	25 July 2011	Final	Étoile du Sahel	0 – 1	Espérance de Tunis	—	Darragi 43'
25	16 August 2016	Quarter-finals	Étoile du Sahel	0 – 1	Espérance de Tunis	—	Khenissi 63'
26	26 May 2021	Round of 16	Espérance de Tunis	0 – 1	Étoile du Sahel	—	Mbé 35'

== Tunisian Super Cup results ==
#	Date	Round	Home team	Score	Away team	Goals (home)	Goals (away)
1	1986	Final	Étoile du Sahel	1 – 1 (pen. 5–4)	Espérance de Tunis		

== International results ==
#	Season	Round		Home team	Score	Away team	Goals (home)	Goals (away)
1	2005 Champions League	Group stage	1st leg	Étoile du Sahel	0 – 0	Espérance de Tunis	—	—
2	2005 Champions League	Group stage	2nd leg	Espérance de Tunis	1 – 1	Étoile du Sahel	Ltaïef 31'	Melliti 6'
3	2006 Confederation Cup	Group stage	1st leg	Étoile du Sahel	1 – 0	Espérance de Tunis	Ben Frej 71' (pen.)	—
4	2006 Confederation Cup	Group stage	2nd leg	Espérance de Tunis	1 – 3	Étoile du Sahel	? 22'	Nafkha 20', ? 63', Chikhaoui 82'
5	2008 Confederation Cup	Play-off round	1st leg	Étoile du Sahel	2 – 0	Espérance de Tunis	Chermiti 18', Ogunbiyi 50'	—
6	2008 Confederation Cup	Play-off round	2nd leg	Espérance de Tunis	0 – 0	Étoile du Sahel	—	—
7	2012 Champions League	Group stage	1st leg	Espérance de Tunis	1 – 0	Étoile du Sahel	Mouelhi 41' (pen.)	—
8	2012 Champions League	Group stage	2nd leg	Étoile du Sahel	0 – 2	Espérance de Tunis	—	Aouadhi 41', N'Djeng 74'
9	2015 Confederation Cup	Group stage	1st leg	Espérance de Tunis	0 – 1	Étoile du Sahel	—	Jemal 49'
10	2015 Confederation Cup	Group stage	2nd leg	Étoile du Sahel	2 – 1	Espérance de Tunis	Bounedjah 90' (pen.), 90+3'	Jouini 25'
11	2018 Champions League	Quarter-finals	1st leg	Espérance de Tunis	2 – 1	Étoile du Sahel	Dhaouadi 2', Derbali 77'	Jemal 28'
12	2018 Champions League	Quarter-finals	2nd leg	Étoile du Sahel	0 – 1	Espérance de Tunis	—	Coulibaly 87'
13	2021–22 Champions League	Group stage	Matchday 3	Espérance de Tunis	0 – 0	Étoile du Sahel	—	—
14	2021–22 Champions League	Group stage	Matchday 4	Étoile du Sahel	0 – 2	Espérance de Tunis	—	Bedrane 66', Ben Romdhane 77'
15	2023–24 Champions League	Group stage	Matchday 1	Espérance de Tunis	2 – 0	Étoile du Sahel	Sasse 60', Meriah 64' (pen.)	—
16	2023–24 Champions League	Group stage	Matchday 5	Étoile du Sahel	0 – 2	Espérance de Tunis	—	Sasse 26', El Ayeb 41'

== Shared player history ==
=== Players who have played for both clubs ===
- (Tunisia) Imed Ben Younes (Étoile du Sahel 1995–98, Espérance de Tunis 2003)
- (Tunisia) Chamseddine Dhaouadi (Étoile du Sahel 2011–12, Espérance de Tunis 2013–20)
- (Tunisia) Mejdi Traoui (Étoile du Sahel 2002–08, Espérance de Tunis 2010–14)
- (Cameroon) Franck Kom (Étoile du Sahel 2011–16, Espérance de Tunis 2017–19)
- (Tunisia) José Clayton (Étoile du Sahel 1995–98, Espérance de Tunis 2001–05)
- (Ivory Coast) Kandia Traoré (Espérance de Tunis 2001, Étoile du Sahel 2002, 2004–05)
- (Tunisia) Amine Ltaïef (Espérance de Tunis 2000–02 & 2005–09, Étoile du Sahel 2011–13)
- (Tunisia) Karim Aouadhi (Espérance de Tunis 2012–14, Étoile du Sahel 2018–19)
- (Tunisia) Riadh Jelassi (Étoile du Sahel 1995–2000, Espérance de Tunis 2001–04)
- (Tunisia) Hamdi Nagguez (Étoile du Sahel 2013–18, Espérance de Tunis 2020–21)
- (Tunisia) Mootez Zaddem (Étoile du Sahel 2021–22, Espérance de Tunis 2022–2025)
- (Tunisia) Youssef Abdelli (Espérance de Tunis 2020 & 2024–25, Étoile du Sahel 2023–24)
- (Tunisia) Hamza Jelassi (Étoile du Sahel 2023–24, Espérance de Tunis 2024–present)
- (Tunisia) Fedi Ben Choug (Espérance de Tunis 2019–22, Étoile du Sahel 2024–present)
- (Tunisia) Houssem Dagdoug (Espérance de Tunis 2022–23, Étoile du Sahel 2024–present)
- (Ivory Coast) Cedrik Gbo (Espérance de Tunis 2019–24, Étoile du Sahel 2024–present)
- (Tunisia) Maher Ben Sghaier (Espérance de Tunis 2017–21, Étoile du Sahel 2025–present)
- (Tunisia) Mohamed Belhadj Mahmoud (Étoile du Sahel 2019–21, Espérance de Tunis 2026–present)

=== Coaches who managed both clubs ===
- (France) Roger Lemerre (Espérance de Tunis 1983–84, Étoile du Sahel 2013–14 & 2018–19 & 2021–2022)
- (Switzerland) Michel Decastel (Espérance de Tunis 2001–03, Étoile du Sahel 2008)
- (Tunisia) Faouzi Benzarti (Étoile du Sahel 1986–87, 1991–92, 2006–07, 2012, 2014–17, 2019 & 2023, Espérance de Tunis 1993–94, 2003, 2007, 2008–10 & 2017)
- (France) Christian Bracconi (Espérance de Tunis 2026 & 2026, Étoile du Sahel 2026–present)

== Tunisian Ligue Professionnelle 1 results ==
Season	55–56	56–57	57–58	58–59	59–60	60–61	61–62	62–63	63–64	64–65	65–66	66–67	67–68	68–69	69–70	70–71	71–72	72–73	73–74	74–75	75–76	76–77	77–78	78–79	79–80	80–81	81–82	82–83	83–84	84–85	85–86	86–87	87–88	88–89	89–90	90–91	91–92	92–93	93–94	94–95	95–96	96–97	97–98	98–99	99–00	00–01	01–02	02–03	03–04	04–05	05–06	06–07	07–08	08–09	09–10	10–11	11–12	12–13	13–14	14–15	15–16	16–17	17–18	18–19	19–20	20–21	21–22	22–23	23–24	24–25
EST	4	2	2	1	1	2	3	10	2	6	5	2	7	6	1	x	9	3	2	1	1	7	6	4	2	3	1	3	5	1	2	3	1	1	2	1	3	1	1	2	3	2	1	1	1	1	1	1	1	4	1	3	1	1	1	1	1	2	1	3	2	1	1	1	1	1	1	2	1	1
ESS	2	3	1	2	7	x	x	1	6	3	1	2	4	5	3	4	1	2	3	3	2	5	3	3	3	4	3	6	3	4	1	1	5	3	4	3	5	9	2	3	2	1	3	4	2	2	2	2	2	2	2	1	2	3	3	2	4	3	3	2	1	2	3	2	4	2	5	1	5	3
