= Malek Mehri =

Tunisian footballer

Personal information
- Date of birth: October 21, 2003 (age 23)
- Place of birth: Ariana, Tunisia
- Height: 1.80 m (5 ft 11 in)
- Position: Midfielder

Youth career
- Espérance de Tunis

Senior career*
Years	Team	Apps	(Gls)
2022–2023	Espérance de Tunis	14	(0)
2023–2024	Whitecaps FC 2	22	(2)
2025–2026	CA Bizertin	2	(0)
2026	AS Soliman	8	(0)
2026–	US Monastir	1	(0)

International career^{‡}
2022–2023	Tunisia U20	9	(0)
- * Club domestic league appearances and goals as of 30 October 2025 ‡ National team caps and goals as of 28 May 2023

Malek Mehri (Arabic: مالك المهري; born 21 October 2003), also known as Malek El Mehri, is a Tunisian professional footballer who plays as a midfielder for US Monastir in the Tunisian Ligue Professionnelle 1.

== Club career ==
In 2022, Mehri began playing with Espérance de Tunis in the Tunisian Ligue Professionnelle 1, making his debut on 18 April 2022 against Étoile Sportive du Sahel. In his first full season with the club, he won the league title with the club, also advancing to the final of the 2022–23 Tunisian Cup and the semi-finals of the 2022–23 CAF Champions League.

In August 2023, he signed with Canadian club Whitecaps FC 2 of MLS Next Pro. On 30 June 2024, he scored his first goal in a victory over St. Louis City 2. After the 2024 season, the club declined his option for 2025.

In September 2025, he signed with Tunisian Ligue Professionnelle 1 club CA Bizertin on a two-year contract. In January 2026, he joined AS Soliman in the Tunisian Ligue Professionnelle 1, on a one-and-a-half year contract. In July 2026, he joined US Monastir in the same division.

== International career ==
In February 2023, he was named to the Tunisia U20 for the 2023 U-20 Africa Cup of Nations. In May 2023, he was named to the squad for the 2023 FIFA U-20 World Cup.

== Career statistics ==
As of 20 October 2024

Club	Season	League			Playoffs		National Cup		Continental		Other		Total	
Club	Season	Division	Apps	Goals	Apps	Goals	Apps	Goals	Apps	Goals	Apps	Goals	Apps	Goals
Espérance de Tunis	2021–22	Tunisian Ligue Professionnelle 1	1	0	—		1	0	0	0	0	0	1	0
Espérance de Tunis	2022–23	Tunisian Ligue Professionnelle 1	13	0	—		1	0	5	0	0	0	20	0
Espérance de Tunis	Total		14	0	0	0	2	0	5	0	0	0	21	0
Whitecaps FC 2	2024	MLS Next Pro	22	2	1	0	—		—		—		23	2
Career total			36	2	1	0	2	0	5	0	0	0	44	2
