= Yacine El Kassah =

French footballer (born 2000)

Personal information
- Date of birth: 8 January 2000 (age 26)
- Place of birth: Paris, France
- Position: Midfielder

Team information
- Current team: CAB

Youth career
- -2016: Nantes
- 2016-2018: Inter

Senior career*
Years	Team	Apps	(Gls)
2019-23	CAB	35	(0)
2023-24	ES Metlaoui	20	(1)
2024-	AS Soliman	18	(0)
- * Club domestic league appearances and goals as of 22 July 2025 @ 17:50(AEST)

Yacine El Kassah (Arabic: ياسين الكاسح; born 8 January 2000) is a French footballer who plays as a midfielder for CAB.

== Career ==
In 2016, El Kassah joined the youth academy of Italian Serie A side Inter. In 2019, he signed for CAB in Tunisia. On 8 February 2020, he debuted for CAB during a 1–2 loss to CSHL.
