= Houssam Ghacha =

Algerian footballer (born 1995)

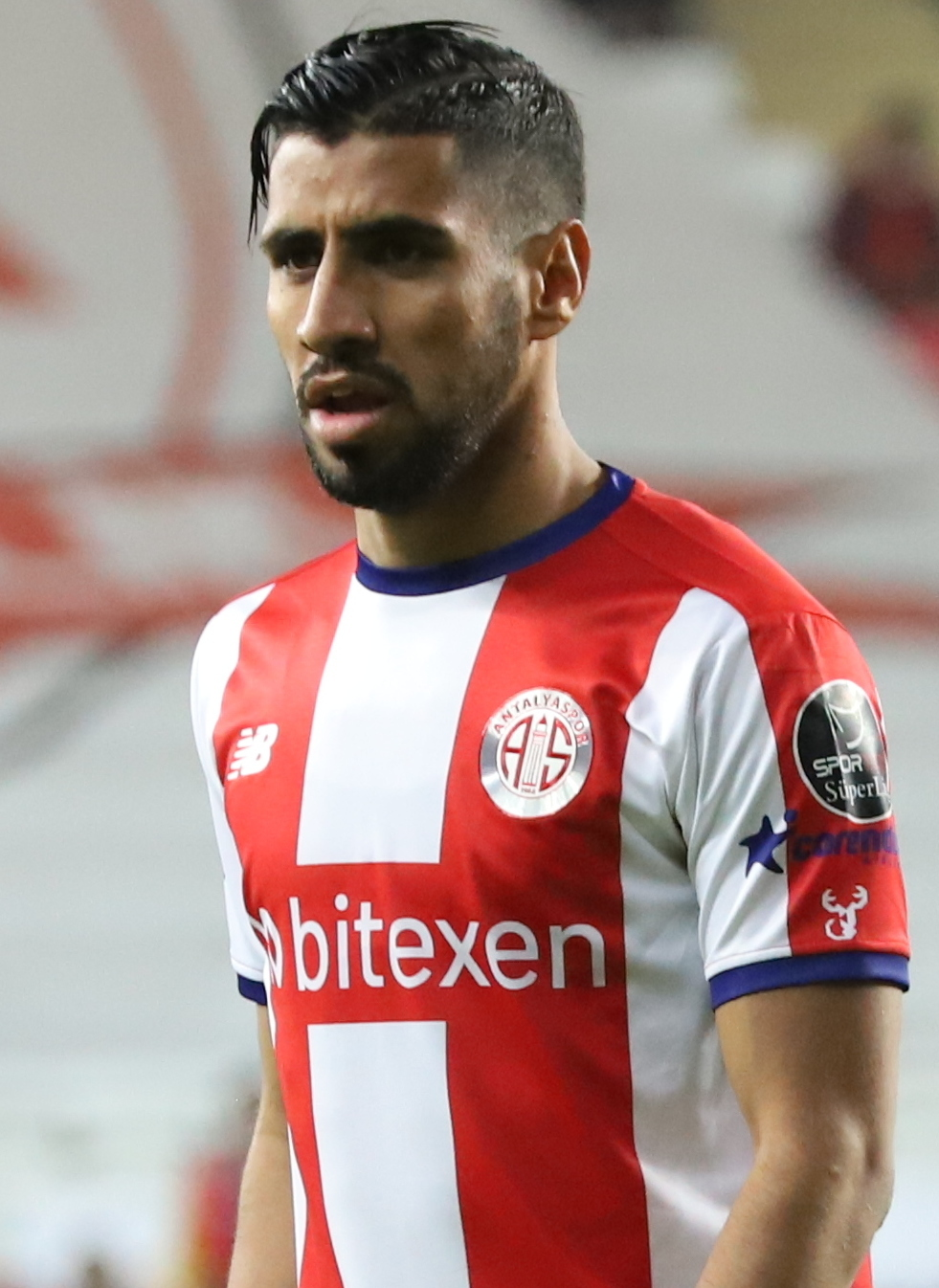
- Ghacha in 2021

Personal information
- Full name: Houssam Eddine Ghacha
- Date of birth: 22 October 1995 (age 31)
- Place of birth: Ouled Djellal, Algeria
- Height: 1.70 m (5 ft 7 in)
- Position: Winger

Team information
- Current team: USM Alger
- Number: 27

Youth career
- CRB Ouled Djellal
- Amal Bou Saâda

Senior career*
Years	Team	Apps	(Gls)
2016–2017	Amal Bou Saâda	47	(2)
2017–2018	USM Blida	23	(1)
2018–2021	ES Sétif	44	(8)
2021–2023	Antalyaspor	57	(1)
2023–2024	Espérance de Tunis	14	(2)
2024–	USM Alger	43	(8)

International career^{‡}
2018–2019	Algeria	1	(0)
- * Club domestic league appearances and goals as of 6 June 2026 ‡ National team caps and goals as of 20 February 2026

Houssam Eddine Ghacha (born 22 October 1995) is an Algerian professional footballer who plays as a winger for Algerian Ligue Professionnelle 1 club USM Alger and the Algeria national team.

== Club career ==
=== ES Sétif ===
On 17 July 2018 Ghacha made his ES Sétif debut as a starter in the 2018 CAF Champions League group stage against Difaâ El Jadidi. Ghacha had an assist and scored the winning goal in the 89th minute to give Sétif the 2–1 victory.

=== Antalyaspor ===
On 22 July 2021, Houssem Eddine Ghacha joined Turkish club Antalyaspor on a three-year contract, leaving ES Sétif after three seasons with the club. He had attracted interest from several clubs following an impressive second half of the 2020–21 season, including USM Alger and French Ligue 1 side FC Nantes. Ghacha ultimately chose to continue his career in Europe and made the move to Turkey.

On 5 January 2022, Ghacha started for Antalyaspor in the 2021 Turkish Super Cup against Beşiktaş, held at the Ahmad bin Ali Stadium in Al Rayyan, Qatar. The match ended 1–1 after extra time, with Beşiktaş winning 4–2 on penalties. Ghacha was substituted in the 64th minute, with Antalyaspor trailing 1–0 at the time.

On 28 December 2021, Houssem Ghacha impressed in Antalyaspor’s 2–1 victory over Giresunspor in the round of 32 of the Turkish Cup, scoring the opening goal of the match. Ghacha headed home a powerful finish to give his team the lead at half-time. With this goal, Ghacha brought his total to three goals in the Turkish Cup and four goals in all competitions for the club, having previously scored once in the Süper Lig against İstanbul Başakşehir.

=== Espérance de Tunis ===
On 25 July 2023, Houssem Ghacha joined the Espérance de Tunis on a two-year contract, running until June 2025. He joined the Tunisian club after leaving Antalyaspor, where he had spent two seasons in the Süper Lig. On 2 September 2023, Ghacha scored his first goal for Espérance Sportive de Tunis in a 3–2 victory over ES Métlaoui. Starting the match, he scored in the 75th minute to give his team the winning goal after the first half had ended 2–2.

In December 2023, Ghacha suffered a muscle injury during Espérance's CAF Champions League group stage match against Petro de Luanda, with Ghacha forced to leave the field before the end of the game. Following medical examinations, he was ruled out for approximately four weeks before undergoing further tests to determine his readiness to return to competition.

In May 2024, Ghacha was part of the Espérance squad that reached the CAF Champions League final, where they faced Al Ahly of Egypt. The Tunisian side were defeated 1–0 on aggregate, following a goalless draw in the first leg and a 1–0 defeat in the return leg. At the end of the season, Ghacha won his first Tunisian Ligue Professionnelle 1 title. The club secured the championship after defeating US Monastir 2–0 at home on 15 June 2024, with one match remaining in the play-offs. After one season with Espérance de Tunis, Ghacha left the club in the summer of 2024. His departure came after an underwhelming season, as he returned to Algeria. Before leaving Tunis, Ghacha paid tribute to his teammates and Espérance supporters in a post on his Facebook page, expressing his appreciation for the club and recalling the intense moments he had experienced during his time with the Tunisian side.

=== USM Alger ===
On 18 July 2024, USM Alger announced the signing of Houssem Ghacha from Espérance de Tunis. The Algerian winger signed a three-year contract with the club, keeping him at USM Alger until June 2027. Ghacha made his debut for USM Alger in the opening round of the Ligue 1, starting against NC Magra. Ghacha scored his first goal for the club on 6 October 2024 against MC El Bayadh, netting the only goal of the match to secure a 1–0 victory.

On 5 February 2025, Ghacha impressed in USM Alger’s 3–0 victory over USM Khenchela, scoring twice in the second half. With USM Alger already leading, Ghacha scored in the 71st and 79th minutes to extend his team’s advantage and secure a convincing victory. His performance made him one of the key contributors to the Rouge et Noir’s win. Houssem Ghacha was part of USM Alger's squad during the successful 2024–25 Algerian Cup campaign. He won his first title with the club as USM Alger defeated CR Belouizdad 2–0 in the final.

During the 2025–26 season, Houssem Ghacha became an increasingly important player in USM Alger's attacking setup. At that stage of the season, he had recorded six goals and eight assists in all competitions, including a hat-trick in the Algerian Cup against MO Constantine. His performances contributed to his growing importance within the team's attacking setup. At the end of the season, Ghacha was considered an important member of USM Alger's attacking unit by head coach Lamine N'Diaye.

Despite going more than a month without scoring, he remained an important player in the team's attacking play, with N'Diaye continuing to rely on his experience and offensive qualities. Near the end of the season, Ghacha suffered a meniscus injury during the Algiers derby against MC Alger, which ultimately ruled him out for the remainder of the campaign. Despite his injury, Ghacha ended the season with two titles. The club won the Algerian Cup after defeating CR Belouizdad in the final, before winning the CAF Confederation Cup against Zamalek SC.

On 23 August 2026, USM Alger extended Houssem Ghacha's contract for two additional seasons as part of the club's efforts to retain key players and maintain squad stability, keeping him at the club until 2029. Ahead of the 2026–27 season, Ghacha outlined his ambitions with the club in an interview published on the team's official social media page. He stated that he aimed to give his best in order to help USM Alger achieve its objectives, emphasizing the importance of teamwork and collective effort within the squad. Ghacha also thanked the club's supporters for their continued backing and expressed the team's ambition to win as many titles as possible during the season.

Despite missing the final in South Africa, the 2026 CAF Super Cup title was added to Houssam Ghacha's collective honours with USM Alger, who were crowned champions after defeating Mamelodi Sundowns on 8 November 2026. A recurrence of his knee meniscus injury ruled him out of the match and forced him to travel to the Aspetar medical centre in Qatar for treatment. As a result, Ghacha neither participated in the final nor attended the medal ceremony, despite his club's triumph.

== Career statistics ==
=== Club ===
As of 30 June 2026

Club	Season	League			Cup		Continental		Other		Total	
Club	Season	Division	Apps	Goals	Apps	Goals	Apps	Goals	Apps	Goals	Apps	Goals
Amal Bou Saâda	2015–16	Ligue 2	20	0	—		—		—		20	0
Amal Bou Saâda	2016–17	Ligue 2	27	2	—		—		—		27	2
Amal Bou Saâda	Total		47	2	—		—		—		47	2
USM Blida	2017–18	Ligue 1	23	1	4	0	—		—		27	1
ES Sétif	2018–19	Ligue 1	27	1	7	1	6 (Note: All appearance(s) in Champions League)	2	—		40	4
ES Sétif	2019–20	Ligue 1	18	7	4	1	—		—		22	8
ES Sétif	2020–21	Ligue 1	25	10	—		4 (Note: All appearance(s) in CAF Confederation Cup)	0	1 (Note: All appearance(s) in Algerian League Cup)	1	30	11
ES Sétif	Total		70	18	11	2	10	2	1	1	92	23
Antalyaspor	2021–22	Süper Lig	32	1	5	3	—		1 (Note: All appearance(s) in Turkish Super Cup)	0	37	4
Antalyaspor	2022–23	Süper Lig	25	0	2	0	—		—		27	0
Antalyaspor	Total		57	1	7	3	—		1	0	64	4
ES Tunis	2023–24	Ligue 1 Pro	14	2	—		17 (Note: 13 appearances in CAF Champions League, 4 appearances in African Football League)	0	2 (Note: All appearance(s) in 2023 Arab Club Champions Cup)	0	33	2
USM Alger	2024–25	Ligue 1	23	6	5	1	10	1	—		38	8
USM Alger	2025–26	Ligue 1	20	2	4	4	11	3	1 (Note: All appearances in Algerian Super Cup)	0	36	9
USM Alger	2026–27	Ligue 1	0	0	0	0	0	0	0	0	0	0
USM Alger	Total		43	8	9	5	21	4	1	0	74	17
Career total			253	32	31	10	48	6	5	1	337	49

== Honours ==
Espérance de Tunis

- Tunisian Ligue Professionnelle 1: 2023–24

USM Alger

- Algerian Cup: 2024–25, 2025–26
- CAF Confederation Cup: 2025–26
- CAF Super Cup: 2026
