= Miguel Cardoso (football manager) =

Portuguese football manager (born 1972)

Personal information
- Full name: José Miguel Azevedo Cardoso
- Date of birth: 28 May 1972 (age 54)
- Place of birth: Trofa, Portugal

Team information
- Current team: Mamelodi Sundowns (manager)

Managerial career
- Years: Team
- 1993–1994: Espinho (youth)
- 2003–2004: Porto (youth)
- 2006–2007: Braga (assistant)
- 2007–2009: Académica (assistant)
- 2009–2011: Braga (assistant)
- 2011–2012: Sporting CP (assistant)
- 2012–2013: Deportivo La Coruña (assistant)
- 2013–2016: Shakhtar Donetsk U21
- 2016–2017: Shakhtar Donetsk (assistant)
- 2017–2018: Rio Ave
- 2018: Nantes
- 2018–2019: Celta Vigo
- 2019: AEK Athens
- 2021: Rio Ave
- 2024: Espérance de Tunis
- 2024–: Mamelodi Sundowns

José Miguel Azevedo Cardoso (born 28 May 1972), known as Miguel Cardoso, is a Portuguese football manager, who is currently the manager of South African Premiership club Mamelodi Sundowns.

== Career ==
=== Early career ===
Born in Trofa, Cardoso graduated in Physical Education and Sports with specialization in football in 1995 and concluded a Masters in Sports Science in 1998 in the College of Sports Science and Physical Education at the University of Porto. He started his coaching career in 1993, taking over S.C. Espinho's under-12 squad.

Cardoso joined FC Porto in 1996, initially as Fernando Freitas' assistant in the under-10 team. He later progressed through the club's youth setup, becoming a fitness coach of the B-team in 1999, and being appointed in charge of the under-15s in 2003.

In April 2004, Cardoso moved to C.F. Os Belenenses and became the first team's fitness coach. On 10 May 2006, he followed former Belenenses manager Carlos Carvalhal to S.C. Braga, with the same role.

In September 2007, Cardoso was named Domingos Paciência's assistant at Associação Académica de Coimbra. He continued to work as Paciência's second man at Braga, Sporting CP and Deportivo de La Coruña.

=== Shakhtar Donetsk ===
On 12 June 2013, Cardoso was presented at FC Shakhtar Donetsk, being appointed manager of the under-21 squad while also working as a coordinator for the club's youth setup. Ahead of the 2016–17 season, he became Paulo Fonseca's assistant at the first team.

Cardoso left Shakhtar on 8 June 2017.

=== Rio Ave ===
On 12 June 2017, Cardoso was appointed at the helm of Primeira Liga club Rio Ave F.C., replacing departing Luís Castro. After achieving three wins and a draw against S.L. Benfica in his first four matches in charge, he was awarded the "Manager of the Month" for August.

Cardoso led Rio Ave to a best-ever campaign in the top flight, finishing fifth (the club's best-ever position shared with the 1981–82 season under Félix Mourinho), winning 51 points (beating the 50 reached by Pedro Martins in 2015–16) and achieving qualification to the UEFA Europa League.

=== Nantes ===
On 13 June 2018, Cardoso was appointed as manager of French Ligue 1 side FC Nantes, replacing Claudio Ranieri. He left the club on 2 October, after only obtaining six points in eight league matches.

=== Celta Vigo ===
On 12 November 2018, Cardoso took over La Liga side RC Celta de Vigo, in the place of sacked Antonio Mohamed. He gained international attention for his first press conference, in which he accidentally said that he was the manager of their rivals Deportivo de La Coruña. The following 3 March he too was dismissed, with the Galicians a place and two points above the relegation zone.

=== AEK Athens ===
On 28 May 2019, Cardoso was appointed as head coach of Greek Super League side AEK Athens F.C., replacing Manolo Jiménez on a two-year deal. He was fired on 25 August after just four matches, his third dismissal in twelve months.

=== Return to Rio Ave ===
After over a year out of work, Cardoso returned to Rio Ave on 29 January 2021, on an 18-month deal. His team came 16th, and had to face Arouca in a play-off for top-flight survival. They lost 5–0 on aggregate; between the two games the termination of his employment was informally arranged, and he was barred from the training ground.

=== Espérance de Tunis ===
On 12 January 2024, Cardoso was appointed as head coach of Tunisian Ligue Professionnelle 1 side Espérance Sportive de Tunis, replacing Tarek Thabet.

=== Mamelodi Sundowns ===
After being sacked by Espérance in October 2024 following a poor start to the season, South African Premiership club Mamelodi Sundowns appointed Cardoso in December 2024. In the 24-25 season, Cardoso won the South African Premiership with Sundowns while finishing as runner-ups in the CAF Champions League. In the 25-26 season, Sundowns won the CAF Champions League while finishing as runner-ups in the Premiership.

== Managerial statistics ==
As of 19 October 2026

Managerial record by team and tenure
Team	Nat	From	To	Record								Ref
Team	Nat	From	To	G	W	D	L	GF	GA	GD	Win %	Ref
Rio Ave	(Portugal)	12 June 2017	13 June 2018	42	20	7	15	62	59	+3	47.62	
Nantes	(France)	13 June 2018	2 October 2018	8	1	3	4	8	13	−5	12.50	
Celta Vigo	(Spain)	12 November 2018	3 March 2019	15	3	2	10	14	26	−12	20.00	
AEK Athens	(Greece)	1 July 2019	25 August 2019	4	1	1	2	5	6	−1	25.00	
Rio Ave	(Portugal)	29 January 2021	27 May 2021	20	4	7	9	14	25	−11	20.00	—
Espérance de Tunis	(Tunisia)	12 January 2024	22 October 2024	26	14	8	4	39	16	+23	53.85	—
Mamelodi Sundowns	(South Africa)	10 December 2024	present	99	64	24	11	184	73	+111	64.65	—
Career Total				214	107	52	55	287	206	+81	50.00	—

== Honours ==
Espérance de Tunis

- Tunisian Ligue Professionnelle 1: 2023–24

Mamelodi Sundowns

- South African Premiership: 2024–25
- CAF Champions League: 2025–26
- MTN 8: 2026
- FIFA African-Asian-Pacific Cup 2026
