= Faissal Mannai =

Tunisian footballer (born 1998)

Personal information
- Date of birth: 3 February 1996 (age 30)
- Place of birth: France
- Height: 1.80 m (5 ft 11 in)
- Position: Midfielder

Team information
- Current team: Bordeaux
- Number: 10

Senior career*
| Years | Team | Apps | (Gls) |
| –2015 | La Mellinet Nantes | | |
| 2015–2016 | JS Kairouan | 13 | (0) |
| 2016–2018 | Montceau Bourgogne | 18 | (1) |
| 2018–2019 | JSC Bellevue Nantes | | |
| 2019–2021 | Cholet | 19 | (1) |
| 2021 | Sète | 13 | (3) |
| 2022–2023 | Concarneau | 49 | (3) |
| 2024 | US Monastir | 25 | (2) |
| 2025– | Bordeaux | 14 | (1) |
- * Club domestic league appearances and goals as of 7 February 2026

Faissal Mannai (born 3 February 1996) is a footballer who plays as a midfielder for Championnat National 1 club Bordeaux. Born in France, he has been called up to represent Tunisia internationally.

== Early life ==
Mannai was born in France in 1996. He grew up in Nantes, France.

== Career ==
In 2022, Mannai signed for French side US Concarneau. He helped the club win the league.

== Personal life ==
Mannai is of Tunisian descent. He has a brother.
