= 2023–24 Tunisian Ligue Professionnelle 1 =

Tunisian Ligue Professionnelle 1
- Season: 2023–24
- Dates: 19 August 2023 – 20 June 2024
- Champions: Espérance de Tunis (33rd title)
- Relegated: AS Marsa
- Champions League: Espérance de Tunis; US Monastir
- Confederation Cup: CS Sfaxien; Stade Tunisien
- Matches: 171
- Goals: 324 (1.89 per match)
- Top goalscorer: Boubacar Traoré; Taieb Ben Zitoun; Rodrigo Rodrigues (10 goals each)
- Biggest home win: US Ben Guerdane 5–0 EGS Gafsa (3 January 2024)
- Biggest away win: EGS Gafsa 0–3 Étoile du Sahel (3 September 2023); AS Marsa 0–3 US Monastir (11 November 2023); US Tataouine 0–3 US Monastir (27 December 2023); AS Marsa 0–3 Olympique Béja (26 May 2024)
- Highest scoring: CA Bizertin 4–2 ES Métlaoui (30 December 2023)
- Longest winning run: Espérance de Tunis (9 matches)
- Longest unbeaten run: Espérance de Tunis (17 matches)
- Longest winless run: AS Marsa; ES Métlaoui (11 matches each)
- Longest losing run: AS Soliman (7 matches)
- Average attendance: 1,850

The 2023–24 Tunisian Ligue Professionnelle 1 (Tunisian Professional League) season was the 69th season of top-tier football in Tunisia.

Étoile du Sahel were the defending champions from the previous season. On 15 June 2024, Espérance de Tunis were officially confirmed as champions with one game to spare following their 2–0 win against US Monastir, securing a record-extending 33rd title.

== Teams ==
14 teams contested the league.

Locations of the 2023–24 Ligue 1 teams
Group A
Group B

=== Stadiums and locations ===
Team	Location	Stadium	Capacity
AS Marsa	Tunis (La Marsa)	Stade Abdelaziz Chtioui	6,500
AS Soliman	Soliman	Stade Municipal de Soliman	3,000
Club Africain	Tunis (Bab Jedid)	Stade Hammadi Agrebi	60,000
CA Bizertin	Bizerte	Stade du 15 Octobre	20,000
CS Sfaxien	Sfax	Stade Taïeb Mhiri	22,000
EGS Gafsa	Gafsa	Stade Olympique de Gafsa	7,000
ES Métlaoui	Métlaoui	Stade Municipal de Métlaoui	6,000
Étoile du Sahel	Sousse	Stade Olympique de Sousse	42,000
Espérance de Tunis	Tunis (Bab Souika)	Stade Hammadi Agrebi	60,000
Olympique Béja	Béja	Stade Boujemaa Kmiti	15,000
Stade Tunisien	Tunis (Le Bardo)	Hédi Enneifer Stadium	11,000
US Ben Guerdane	Ben Guerdane	Stade du 7 Mars	10,000
US Monastir	Monastir	Stade Mustapha Ben Jannet	20,000
US Tataouine	Tataouine	Stade Nejib Khattab	5,000

== Competition ==
=== First round ===
The draw of the first round was held on 1 August 2023.

==== Group A ====
===== Table =====
Pos	Team	Pld	W	D	L	GF	GA	GD	Pts	Qualification
1	Étoile du Sahel	12	7	4	1	15	5	+10	25	Advance to the playoff
2	Stade Tunisien	12	7	3	2	18	10	+8	24 (Note: Ranked on head-to-head points: Stade Tunisien 4, Club Africain 1.)	Advance to the playoff
3	Club Africain	12	7	3	2	14	7	+7	24	Advance to the playoff
4	US Ben Guerdane	12	4	3	5	13	11	+2	15	Advance to the playout
5	Olympique Béja	12	4	2	6	8	14	−6	14	Advance to the playout
6	EGS Gafsa	12	3	3	6	9	18	−9	12	Advance to the playout
7	AS Soliman	12	1	0	11	7	19	−12	3	Advance to the playout

Source: Tunisian Football Federation
Rules for classification: 1) points; 2) head-to-head points; 3) head-to-head goal difference; 4) goal difference; 5) total goals; 6) fairplay ranking; 7) playoff.

===== Results =====
Home \ Away	ASS	CA	EGSG	ESS	OB	ST	USBG
AS Soliman		1–2	0–2	1–2	2–0	1–2	0–1
Club Africain	1–0		0–0	1–0	3–1	1–1	2–0
EGS Gafsa	1–0	0–1		0–3	1–0	1–3	1–1
Étoile du Sahel	3–0	1–1	2–1		0–0	0–0	1–0
Olympique Béja	2–1	0–1	1–0	2–1		0–1	1–1
Stade Tunisien	1–0	2–1	2–2	0–1	3–0		2–1
US Ben Guerdane	2–1	0–1	5–0	0–0	0–1	2–1	

Source: Tunisian Football Federation
Legend: Blue = home team win; Yellow = draw; Red = away team win.
For upcoming matches, an "a" indicates there is an article about the rivalry between the two participants.

===== Clubs season-progress =====
Team ╲ Round	1	2	3	4	5	6	7	8	9	10	11	12	13	14
AS Soliman	L	E	L	L	L	L	L	L	E	W	L	L	L	L
Club Africain	W	D	E	D	D	W	W	W	W	E	L	L	W	W
EGS Gafsa	E	D	L	D	W	L	D	E	L	L	L	W	W	L
Étoile du Sahel	L	W	W	D	E	W	W	D	D	W	W	E	D	W
Olympique Béja	W	L	W	E	W	W	L	D	L	L	E	D	L	L
Stade Tunisien	W	W	L	D	D	L	E	W	W	W	W	W	D	E
US Ben Guerdane	L	L	W	W	L	E	D	L	D	L	W	D	E	W

Source: Tunisian Football Federation
W = Win; D = Draw; L = Lose; E = Exempt

==== Group B ====
===== Table =====
Pos	Team	Pld	W	D	L	GF	GA	GD	Pts	Qualification
1	Espérance de Tunis	12	10	2	0	20	5	+15	32	Advance to the playoff
2	US Monastir	12	8	2	2	22	9	+13	26	Advance to the playoff
3	CS Sfaxien	12	6	2	4	12	4	+8	20	Advance to the playoff
4	CA Bizertin	12	4	4	4	12	13	−1	16	Advance to the playout
5	ES Métlaoui	12	2	3	7	10	20	−10	9 (Note: Ranked on head-to-head points: ES Métlaoui 4, US Tataouine 1.)	Advance to the playout
6	US Tataouine	12	2	3	7	6	17	−11	9	Advance to the playout
7	AS Marsa	12	1	2	9	4	18	−14	5	Advance to the playout

Source: Tunisian Football Federation
Rules for classification: 1) points; 2) head-to-head points; 3) head-to-head goal difference; 4) goal difference; 5) total goals; 6) fairplay ranking; 7) playoff.

===== Results =====
Home \ Away	ASM	CAB	CSS	ESM	EST	USM	UST
AS Marsa		0–0	0–1	1–1	0–1	0–3	0–1
CA Bizertin	3–1		0–0	4–2	0–2	0–2	1–0
CS Sfaxien	3–0	2–0		2–0	0–1	0–0	3–0
ES Métlaoui	0–1	1–1	1–0		0–2	0–3	1–0
Espérance de Tunis	1–0	1–1	1–0	3–2		2–0	3–0
US Monastir	3–1	1–0	1–0	3–2	1–2		3–0
US Tataouine	1–0	1–2	0–1	0–0	1–1	2–2	

Source: Tunisian Football Federation
Legend: Blue = home team win; Yellow = draw; Red = away team win.
For upcoming matches, an "a" indicates there is an article about the rivalry between the two participants.

===== Clubs season-progress =====
Team ╲ Round	1	2	3	4	5	6	7	8	9	10	11	12	13	14
AS Marsa	L	L	L	D	E	L	D	L	L	L	L	E	L	W
CA Bizertin	L	L	E	D	W	D	L	D	L	E	W	W	W	D
CS Sfaxien	W	W	W	L	L	E	L	D	W	W	W	L	E	D
ES Métlaoui	W	E	L	W	L	D	D	D	E	L	L	L	L	L
Espérance de Tunis	W	D	W	E	W	W	W	W	W	W	E	W	W	D
US Monastir	E	W	W	D	W	L	W	E	W	W	W	W	L	D
US Tataouine	L	D	L	D	L	W	E	D	L	L	L	L	W	E

Source: Tunisian Football Federation
W = Win; D = Draw; L = Lose; E = Exempt

=== Playoff ===
The draw of the playoff was held on 14 January 2024.

==== Table ====
Pos	Team	Pld	W	D	L	GF	GA	GD	Pts	Qualification
1	Espérance de Tunis (C)	10	6	3	1	13	7	+6	24 (Note: Étoile du Sahel and Espérance de Tunis were added 3 points (1sts of the groups in the first round).)	Qualification for the Champions League
2	US Monastir	10	3	5	2	8	5	+3	16 (Note: Stade Tunisien and US Monastir were added 2 points (2nds of the groups in the first round).)	Qualification for the Champions League
3	CS Sfaxien	10	2	6	2	6	5	+1	13 (Note: Club Africain and CS Sfaxien were added 1 point (3rds of the groups in the first round).)	Qualification for the Confederation Cup
4	Stade Tunisien	10	1	8	1	5	5	0	13	Qualification for the Confederation Cup
5	Étoile du Sahel	10	0	7	3	4	7	−3	10	
6	Club Africain	10	1	5	4	4	11	−7	9	

Source: Tunisian Football Federation
Rules for classification: 1) points; 2) head-to-head points; 3) head-to-head goal difference; 4) goal difference; 5) total goals; 6) fairplay ranking; 7) playoff.
(C) Champions

==== Results ====
Home \ Away	CA	CSS	ESS	EST	ST	USM
Club Africain		1–3	0–0	1–2	0–0	1–0
CS Sfaxien	0–0		0–0	0–0	0–0	0–1
Étoile du Sahel	0–0	1–2		0–1	0–0	0–0
Espérance de Tunis	1–0	1–1	3–2		2–0	2–0
Stade Tunisien	1–1	0–0	1–1	2–0		0–0
US Monastir	4–0	1–0	0–0	1–1	1–1	

Source: Tunisian Football Federation
Legend: Blue = home team win; Yellow = draw; Red = away team win.
For upcoming matches, an "a" indicates there is an article about the rivalry between the two participants.

==== Clubs season-progress ====
Team ╲ Round	1	2	3	4	5	6	7	8	9	10
Club Africain	D	W	L	D	D	L	L	L	D	D
CS Sfaxien	D	D	L	D	D	W	D	L	W	D
Étoile du Sahel	D	L	D	D	D	D	L	D	L	D
Espérance de Tunis	W	W	W	D	D	L	W	W	W	D
Stade Tunisien	L	D	D	D	D	W	D	D	D	D
US Monastir	D	L	W	D	D	D	W	W	L	D

Source: Tunisian Football Federation
W = Win; D = Draw; L = Lose

==== Positions by round ====
Team ╲ Round	1	2	3	4	5	6	7	8	9	10
Club Africain	4	2	3	3	3	6	6	6	6	6
CS Sfaxien	5	4	6	6	6	4	4	4	3	3
Étoile du Sahel	2	3	4	4	4	5	5	5	5	5
Espérance de Tunis	1	1	1	1	1	1	1	1	1	1
Stade Tunisien	6	6	5	5	5	2	3	3	4	4
US Monastir	3	5	2	2	2	3	2	2	2	2

Leader
2024–25 CAF Champions League
2024–25 CAF Confederation Cup

Source: Tunisian Football Federation

=== Playout ===
The draw of the playout was held on 14 January 2024.

==== Table ====
Pos	Team	Pld	W	D	L	GF	GA	GD	Pts	Relegation
1	Olympique Béja	14	8	3	3	21	9	+12	30 (Note: ES Métlaoui and Olympique Béja were added 3 points (5ths of the groups in the first round).)	
2	CA Bizertin	14	6	5	3	17	10	+7	27 (Note: CA Bizertin and US Ben Guerdane were added 4 points (4ths of the groups in the first round).)	
3	EGS Gafsa	14	5	4	5	11	11	0	21 (Note: EGS Gafsa and US Tataouine were added 2 points (6ths of the groups in the first round).)	
4	US Tataouine	14	5	4	5	11	16	−5	21	
5	ES Métlaoui	14	4	5	5	15	17	−2	20	
6	US Ben Guerdane	14	4	3	7	12	15	−3	19	
7	AS Soliman	14	6	1	7	13	15	−2	19	
8	AS Marsa (R)	14	5	1	8	13	20	−7	16	Relegation to Ligue 2

Source: Tunisian Football Federation
Rules for classification: 1) points; 2) head-to-head points; 3) head-to-head goal difference; 4) goal difference; 5) total goals; 6) fairplay ranking; 7) playoff.
(R) Relegated

==== Results ====
Home \ Away	ASM	ASS	CAB	EGSG	ESM	OB	USBG	UST
AS Marsa		0–1	2–2	1–0	1–0	0–3	2–1	3–1
AS Soliman	1–0		1–0	2–0	2–2	3–1	0–1	1–3
CA Bizertin	1–0	2–0		2–2	2–0	1–0	2–0	2–0
EGS Gafsa	1–0	1–0	1–0		1–0	1–2	0–0	3–1
ES Métlaoui	3–1	1–0	2–2	1–1		2–1	3–1	0–0
Olympique Béja	3–0	3–0	0–0	0–0	2–1		2–1	3–0
US Ben Guerdane	1–2	1–0	1–1	1–0	3–0	0–1		0–0
US Tataouine	2–1	0–2	1–0	1–0	0–0	0–0	2–1	

Source: Tunisian Football Federation
Legend: Blue = home team win; Yellow = draw; Red = away team win.
For upcoming matches, an "a" indicates there is an article about the rivalry between the two participants.

==== Clubs season-progress ====
Team ╲ Round	1	2	3	4	5	6	7	8	9	10	11	12	13	14
AS Marsa	L	W	L	L	L	L	W	W	L	W	L	L	D	W
AS Soliman	W	L	W	W	L	L	L	L	L	L	W	W	W	D
CA Bizertin	W	D	W	L	W	W	L	D	W	D	D	L	D	W
EGS Gafsa	D	L	L	W	L	W	L	L	W	W	D	W	D	L
ES Métlaoui	L	D	W	L	W	L	W	D	D	L	W	L	D	D
Olympique Béja	L	D	D	W	W	W	W	W	L	W	L	W	W	W
US Ben Guerdane	D	W	L	D	L	L	L	W	W	D	L	W	L	L
US Tataouine	W	D	D	D	W	W	W	L	D	L	W	L	L	L

Source: Tunisian Football Federation
W = Win; D = Draw; L = Lose

==== Relegation decider match ====
On 14 June 2024, the Tunisian Football Federation decided to increase the Tunisian Ligue Professionnelle 1 teams number from 14 to 16, and decided to hold a match between those ranked 7th and 8th of the playout, AS Soliman and AS Marsa, on 19 June to find out the identity of the team relegated to the Tunisian Ligue Professionnelle 2.

19 June 2024
16:00

AS Soliman	1–0	AS Marsa
S. Mejri 36' (pen.)	Report

Stade Chedly Zouiten, Tunis
Attendance: 0 (close doors)
Referee: Badis Ben Salah

== Season statistics ==
=== Top scorers ===
Rank	Goalscorer	Club	Goals
1	(Mali) Boubacar Traoré	USM	10
1	(Tunisia) Taieb Ben Zitoun	CAB	10
1	(Brazil) Rodrigo Rodrigues	EST	10
4	(Tunisia) Nassim Sioud	USBG	8
5	(Tunisia) Ahmed Amri	OB	7
6	(Tunisia) Rayen Hamrouni	ASS	6
6	(Republic of the Congo) Chance Leroy Mondzenga	ESM	6
6	(Nigeria) Kingsley Eduwo	CA	6
6	(Tunisia) Houssem Habbassi	USBG	6

=== Final ranking ===
Rank	Team	Pld	W	D	L	GF	GA	GD	Pts	Qualification or relegation
1	Espérance de Tunis (C)	22	16	5	1	33	12	+21	56	Qualification for the Champions League
2	US Monastir	22	11	7	4	30	14	+16	42	Qualification for the Champions League
3	CS Sfaxien	22	8	8	6	18	9	+9	33	Qualification for the Confederation Cup
4	Stade Tunisien	22	8	11	3	23	15	+8	37	Qualification for the Confederation Cup
5	Étoile du Sahel	22	7	11	4	19	12	+7	35	
6	Club Africain	22	8	8	6	18	18	0	33	
7	Olympique Béja	26	12	5	9	29	23	+6	44	
8	CA Bizertin	26	10	9	7	29	23	+6	43	
9	EGS Gafsa	26	7	8	11	20	29	–9	33	
10	US Tataouine	26	7	7	12	17	33	–16	30	
11	ES Métlaoui	26	6	8	12	25	37	–12	29	
12	US Ben Guerdane	26	8	6	13	25	26	–1	34	
13	AS Soliman	26	7	1	18	20	34	–14	22	
14	AS Marsa (R)	26	5	3	18	17	38	–21	21	Relegation to Ligue 2

(C) Champions; (R) Relegated

=== Hat-tricks ===
Player	For	Against	Result	Date
(Tunisia) Nassim Sioud^{4}	US Ben Guerdane	EGS Gafsa	5–0 (H)	3 January 2024

^{4} – Player scored four goals.

=== Scoring ===
- First goal of the season:
  (Tunisia) Bilel Mejri for Stade Tunisien against AS Soliman (19 August 2023)
- Last goal of the season:
  (Niger) Youssouf Oumarou for Stade Tunisien against US Monastir (19 June 2024)

== Number of teams by Governorate ==
Position	Governorate	Number	Teams
1	Tunis	4	AS Marsa, Club Africain, Espérance de Tunis, Stade Tunisien
2	Gafsa	2	EGS Gafsa, ES Métlaoui
3	Sfax	1	CS Sfaxien
3	Nabeul	1	AS Soliman
3	Sousse	1	Étoile du Sahel
3	Bizerte	1	CA Bizertin
3	Monastir	1	US Monastir
3	Medenine	1	US Ben Guerdane
3	Béja	1	Olympique Béja
3	Tataouine	1	US Tataouine

== Attendances ==
#	Football club	Average attendance
1	Espérance de Tunis	6,084
2	Club Africain	5,717
3	Étoile du Sahel	4,641
4	Stade Tunisien	1,669
5	CA Bizertin	1,565
6	CS Sfaxien	1,524
7	US Monastir	1,445
8	EGS Gafsa	1,164
9	AS Marsa	880
10	US Ben Guerdane	326
11	US Tataouine	326
12	AS Soliman	321
13	Olympique Béja	233
14	ES Métlaoui	113

== See also ==
- 2023–24 Tunisian Cup
- 2023–24 Tunisian Super Cup
