= Zakaria El Ayeb =

Tunisian footballer

Personal information
- Full name: Zakaria El Ayeb
- Date of birth: 15 January 2003 (age 23)
- Place of birth: Tunisia
- Height: 1.86 m (6 ft 1 in)
- Position: Midfielder

Team information
- Current team: AS Soliman (on loan from Espérance de Tunis)

Youth career
- Espérance de Tunis

Senior career*
Years	Team	Apps	(Gls)
2023–2026	Espérance de Tunis	37	(2)
2025–2026	→ AS Soliman (loan)	0	(0)
2026–	Stade Tunisien	0	(0)
- * Club domestic league appearances and goals as of 29 December 2024

Zakaria El Ayeb (Arabic: زكريا العايب; born 15 January 2003) is a Tunisian professional footballer who plays as a midfielder for Tunisian Ligue Professionnelle 1 club Stade Tunisien.
