= Raki Aouani =

Tunisian footballer (born 2004)

Personal information
- Full name: Raki Aouani
- Date of birth: 11 September 2004 (age 22)
- Place of birth: Tunisia
- Height: 1.79 m (5 ft 10 in)
- Position: Forward

Team information
- Current team: Riga FC
- Number: 7

Youth career
- Étoile du Sahel

Senior career*
Years	Team	Apps	(Gls)
2022–2026	Étoile du Sahel	103	(12)
2026–	Riga FC	21	(3)

International career^{‡}
	Tunisia U20	5	(0)
- * Club domestic league appearances and goals as of 12 November 2026 ‡ National team caps and goals as of January 2026

Raki Aouani (Arabic: راقي العواني; born 11 September 2004) is a Tunisian professional footballer who plays as a forward for Riga FC in Latvia.

== Club career ==
Aouani progressed through the youth system of Étoile du Sahel and made his first-team breakthrough in 2022. He featured regularly for Étoile in domestic competitions and was regarded as one of Tunisia's promising young attackers.

In January 2026, Aouani moved to Europe, signing for Latvian side Riga FC on a permanent transfer. The club announced the signing as part of their preparations for the Virslīga season; local reports noted Aouani had made over 100 appearances for Étoile before the transfer.

== International career ==
Aouani has represented Tunisia at under-20 level, including appearances in regional youth competitions.

== Career statistics ==
=== Club ===
As of 14 June 2026.

Club	Season	League	Apps	Goals
Étoile du Sahel	2021–22	CLP-1	9	2
Étoile du Sahel	2022–23	CLP-1		
Étoile du Sahel	2023–24	CLP-1		
Étoile du Sahel	2024–25	CLP-1		
Étoile du Sahel	2025–26	CLP-1		
Étoile du Sahel — Career total			103	12
Riga FC	2026–	Virslīga	7	1
