= Roger Aholou =

Togolese footballer (born 1993)

Personal information
- Full name: Roger Ben Boris Aholou
- Date of birth: 30 December 1993 (age 32)
- Place of birth: Abidjan, Ivory Coast
- Height: 1.82 m (6 ft 0 in)
- Position: Defensive midfielder

Senior career*
Years	Team	Apps	(Gls)
2014–2017	Stella Club		
2017–2020	San Pédro	12	(0)
2020–2022	US Monastir	52	(3)
2022–2023	Raja CA	43	(2)
2024–2025	Espérance de Tunis	21	(0)
2025–2026	Al Ittihad Tripoli	16	(1)

International career^{‡}
2019	Ivory Coast	1	(0)
2021–	Togo	25	(1)
- * Club domestic league appearances and goals as of 16 July 2026 ‡ National team caps and goals as of 5 June 2026

Roger Ben Boris Aholou (born 30 December 1993) is a professional footballer who plays as a defensive midfielder. Born in Ivory Coast, he played for the Ivory Coast national team once before switching to play for the Togo national team.

== Career ==
Aholou began his senior career with the Ivorian clubs Stella Club and FC San Pedro, before moving to the Tunisian club Monastir on 16 November 2020. He made his professional debut with Monastir in a 2–1 Tunisian Ligue Professionnelle 1 loss to CS Sfaxien on 10 December 2020.

== International career ==
Aholou was born in the Ivory Coast to a Togolese father. He made his debut with the Ivory Coast national team in a 2–0 2020 African Nations Championship qualification loss to Niger on 22 September 2019. He switched to represent the Togo national team for matches in September 2021. He debuted with the Togo national team in a 2–0 2022 FIFA World Cup qualification loss to the Senegal national team on 1 September 2021.

=== International goal ===
Scores and results list Togo's goal tally first.

No.	Date	Venue	Opponent	Score	Result	Competition
1.	9 September 2024	Estadio de Malabo, Malabo, Equatorial Guinea	Equatorial Guinea	1–1	2–2	2025 Africa Cup of Nations qualification

== Personal life ==
Aholou's father was a Togolese footballer who played, and then settled in the Ivory Coast. He is the brother of the Ivorian international footballer Jean-Eudes Aholou.

== Career statistics ==
=== International ===
As of match played 5 June 2026

Appearances and goals by national team and year
National team	Year	Apps	Goals
Ivory Coast	2019	1	0
Total		1	0
Togo	2021	4	0
Togo	2023	6	0
Togo	2024	10	1
Togo	2025	2	0
Togo	2026	3	0
Total		25	1
Career total		26	1
