= Mohamed Ali Ben Hammouda =

Tunisian footballer

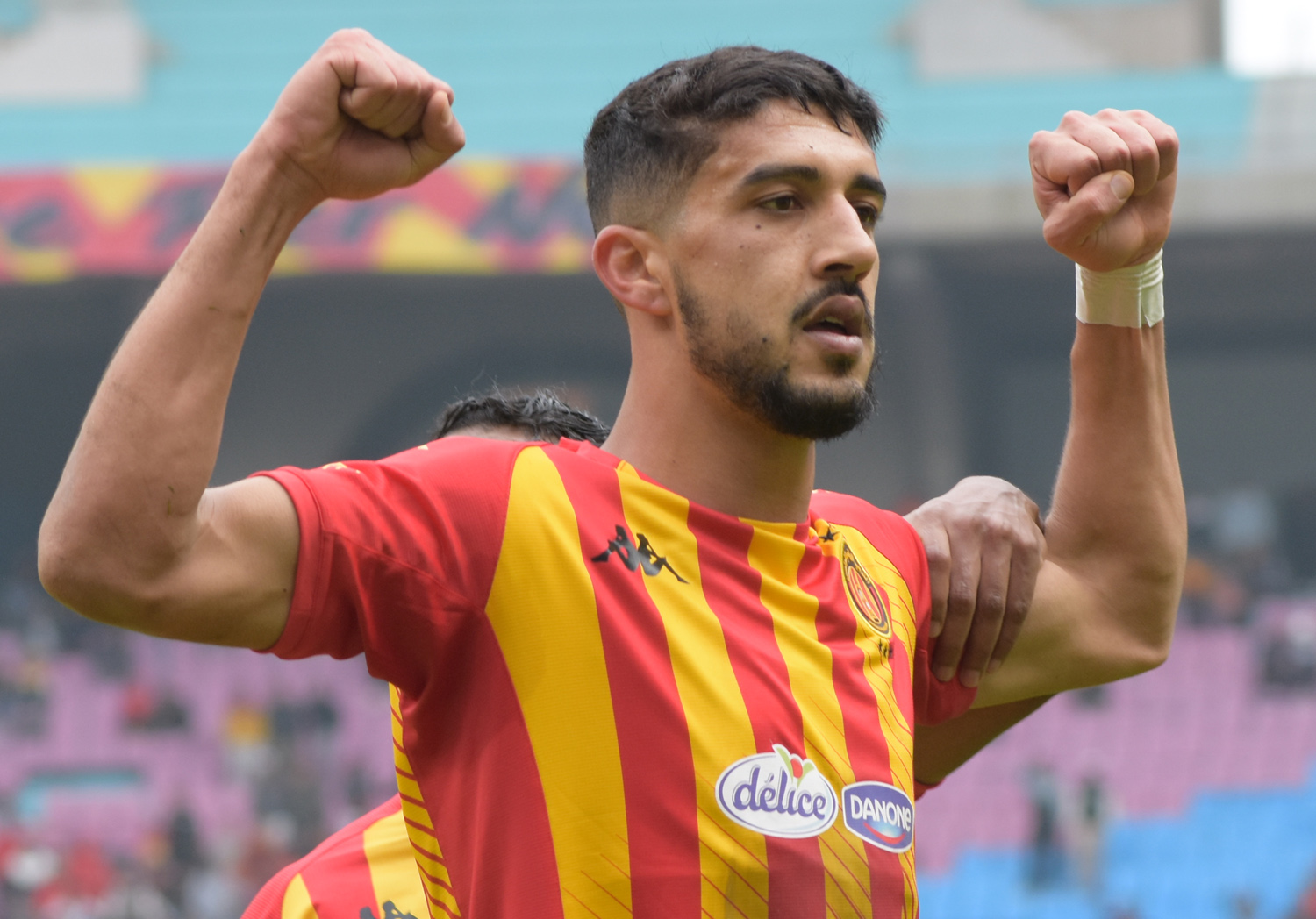

Personal information
- Full name: Mohamed Ali Ben Hammouda
- Date of birth: 24 July 1998 (age 28)
- Place of birth: Soliman, Tunisia
- Height: 1.90 m (6 ft 3 in)
- Position: Forward

Team information
- Current team: CR Belouizdad
- Number: 20

Senior career*
Years	Team	Apps	(Gls)
2018–2020	Avenir de Soliman	11	(6)
2020–2021	Espérance de Tunis	19	(2)
2021	→ Avenir de Soliman (loan)	12	(1)
2021–2022	Avenir de Soliman	7	(2)
2022	→ Espérance de Tunis (loan)	11	(8)
2022–2024	Espérance de Tunis	35	(5)
2024–2025	Ghazl El Mahalla	22	(9)
2025–	CR Belouizdad	25	(9)

International career^{‡}
2026–	Tunisia	1	(0)
- * Club domestic league appearances and goals as of 5 June 2026 ‡ National team caps and goals as of 13 November 2026

Mohamed Ali Ben Hammouda (Arabic: محمد علي بن حمودة; born 24 July 1998) is a Tunisian professional footballer who plays for Ligue Professionnelle 1 club CR Belouizdad and the Tunisia national team.
