= Hani Amamou =

Tunisian footballer

Personal information
- Date of birth: 16 September 1997 (age 29)
- Place of birth: Moknine, Tunisia
- Height: 1.89 m (6 ft 2 1/2 in)
- Position: Centre-back

Senior career*
Years	Team	Apps	(Gls)
2016–2021	CS Sfaxien	103	(5)
2021–2024	Espérance de Tunis	41	(0)
2024–2025	Raja CA	2	(0)
- * Club domestic league appearances and goals as of 23 July 2025

Hani Amamou (Arabic: هاني عمامو) (born 16 September 1997) is a Tunisian professional footballer who plays as a defender.
