= Rodrigo Rodrigues (footballer) =

Brazilian footballer (born 1996)

Personal information
- Full name: Rodrigo Rodrigues Silva
- Date of birth: 18 June 1996 (age 30)
- Place of birth: Fortaleza, Brazil
- Height: 1.89 m (6 ft 2 in)
- Position: Forward

Team information
- Current team: Coritiba
- Number: 99

Youth career
- Palmeiras
- Bahia

Senior career*
Years	Team	Apps	(Gls)
2015–2017	Bahia	1	(0)
2017	→ Juazeirense (loan)	3	(0)
2018	Ferroviário	6	(2)
2018–2019	ABC	25	(8)
2019	→ Atlético Goianiense (loan)	16	(4)
2020	Paraná	9	(0)
2020–2021	Vilafranquense	19	(2)
2021–2023	CSA	44	(17)
2023	Juventude	31	(12)
2023–2025	Espérance de Tunis	21	(14)
2025–	Coritiba	4	(1)
- * Club domestic league appearances and goals as of 15 December 2025

Rodrigo Rodrigues Silva (born 18 June 1996), known as Rodrigo Rodrigues, is a Brazilian professional footballer who plays as a forward for Campeonato Brasileiro Série A club Coritiba.

== Career ==
Born in Fortaleza, Ceará, Rodrigo Rodrigues represented Palmeiras and Bahia as a youth. He made his first team debut with the latter on 28 November 2015, coming on as a second-half substitute for Jacó in a 1–0 Série B home win over Atlético Goianiense.

In May 2016, after another two matches, Rodrigo Rodrigues was definitely promoted to the main squad, but subsequently did not feature for the side. On 18 January 2017, he was loaned to Juazeirense.

On 30 January 2018, Rodrigo Rodrigues was announced at Ferroviário. On 24 May, after just 11 matches, he moved to ABC.

On 15 July 2019, Rodrigo Rodrigues was loaned to Atlético Goianiense until the end of the year. On 21 January 2020, he agreed to a contract with Paraná, but was released on 4 August.

On 12 August 2020, Rodrigo Rodrigues moved abroad and joined Liga Portugal 2 side Vilafranquense on a two-year deal. He left the side on 29 June 2021, and returned to his home country on 28 September, with CSA.

On 20 January 2023, Rodrigo Rodrigues signed a two-year contract with Juventude. On 30 September, he signed a three-year deal with Tunisian club Espérance de Tunis.

== Career statistics ==
As of 24 June 2025

Appearances and goals by club, season and competition
Club	Season	League			State League		Cup		Continental		Other		Total	
Club	Season	Division	Apps	Goals	Apps	Goals	Apps	Goals	Apps	Goals	Apps	Goals	Apps	Goals
Bahia	2015	Série B	1	0	0	0	0	0	—		—		1	0
Bahia	2016	Série B	0	0	0	0	1	0	—		1 (Note: Appearance(s) in Copa do Nordeste)	0	2	0
Bahia	Total		1	0	0	0	1	0	0	0	1	0	3	0
Juazeirense (loan)	2017	Série D	0	0	3	0	—		—		1	0	4	0
Ferroviário	2018	Série D	0	0	6	2	3	1	—		2	0	11	3
ABC	2018	Série C	7	2	—		—		—		=2|—		7	2
ABC	2019	Série C	5	1	13	5	3	2	—		6	1	27	9
ABC	Total		12	3	13	5	3	2	0	0	6	1	34	11
Atlético Goianiense (loan)	2019	Série B	16	4	—		—		—		—		16	4
Paraná	2020	Série B	0	0	9	0	2	0	—		—		11	0
Vilafranquense	2020–21	Liga Portugal 2	19	2	—		3	4	—		—		22	6
CSA	2021	Série B	3	0	—		—		—		—		3	0
CSA	2022	Série B	29	9	11	8	3	0	—		8	3	51	20
CSA	2023	Série B	0	0	1	0	0	0	—		2	0	3	0
CSA	Total		32	9	12	8	3	0	0	0	10	3	57	20
Juventude	2023	Série B	20	6	11	6	1	0	—		—		32	12
Espérance de Tunis	2023–24	Ligue 1	16	10	—		—		14 (Note: Ten appearances in CAF Champions League, four appearances and one goal in African Football League)	1	—		30	11
Espérance de Tunis	2024–25	Ligue 1	11	4	—		3	1	5 (Note: Appearances in CAF Champions League)	0	3 (Note: Appearances in FIFA Club World Cup)	0	22	5
Espérance de Tunis	Total		27	14	0	0	3	1	19	1	3	0	52	16
Coritiba	2025	Série B	0	0	0	0	0	0	—		—		0	0
Career total			127	38	54	21	19	8	19	1	23	4	242	72

== Honours ==
Espérance de Tunis

- Tunisian Ligue Professionnelle 1: 2023–24, 2024–25
- Tunisian Super Cup: 2024, 2025
- Tunisian Cup: 2024–25

Individual

- Tunisian Ligue Professionnelle 1 top goalscorer: 2023–24
