= Oussama Bouguerra =

Tunisian footballer (born 1998)

Personal information
- Full name: Oussama Bouguerra
- Date of birth: 17 October 1998 (age 28)
- Place of birth: Chebika, Tunisia
- Height: 1.83 m (6 ft 0 in)
- Position: Winger

Team information
- Current team: Club Africain
- Number: 29

Youth career
- US Chebika
- JS Kairouan

Senior career*
Years	Team	Apps	(Gls)
2017–2021	JS Kairouan	68	(2)
2021–2023	Olympique Béja	54	(13)
2023–2026	Espérance de Tunis	27	(2)
2025	→ Al Batin (loan)	15	(4)
2026–	Club Africain	10	(1)

International career^{‡}
2023–	Tunisia	1	(0)
- * Club domestic league appearances and goals as of 18 May 2025 ‡ National team caps and goals as of 17 June 2023

Oussama Bouguerra (Arabic: أسامة بوقرة; born 17 October 1998) is a Tunisian professional footballer who plays as a winger for Tunisian Ligue Professionnelle 1 club Club Africain.

== Career ==
Bouguerra started his career with JS Kairouan. On 23 July 2021, he joined Olympique Béja. On 3 July 2023, he joined Espérance de Tunis.
