= Raed Bouchniba =

Tunisian football player (born 2003)

Personal information
- Full name: Raed Bouchniba
- Date of birth: 25 September 2003 (age 23)
- Place of birth: Tunis, Tunisia
- Height: 1.82 m (6 ft 0 in)
- Position: Defender

Team information
- Current team: US Monastir
- Number: 7

Youth career
- Espérance de Tunis

Senior career*
Years	Team	Apps	(Gls)
2022–2026	Espérance de Tunis	64	(3)
2026	US Monastir	9	(0)
2026	Ghazl El Mahalla	0	(0)
2026-	US Monastir	5	(2)

International career^{‡}
2023	Tunisia U20	4	(0)
2024–	Tunisia	4	(0)
- * Club domestic league appearances and goals as of 03 November 2026 ‡ National team caps and goals as of 15 October 2024

Raed Bouchniba (Arabic: رائد بوشنيبة; born 25 September 2003) is a Tunisian footballer who plays as a defender for US Monastir and the Tunisia national team.

== Career ==
Bouchniba started his career with Espérance de Tunis. He played in the CAF Champions League.

== Style of play ==
He mainly operates as a full-back.
