= Ghaith Ouahabi =

Tunisian footballer

Personal information
- Full name: Ghaith Ouahabi
- Date of birth: 2 May 2003 (age 23)
- Place of birth: Tabarka, Tunisia
- Height: 1.89 m (6 ft 2 in)
- Positions: Midfielder; central defender

Youth career
- Espérance de Tunis

Senior career*
Years	Team	Apps	(Gls)
2022–2026	Espérance de Tunis	40	(2)
2025	→ Dinamo Batumi (loan)	24	(0)

International career
2022–2023	Tunisia U20	12	(0)
- * Club domestic league appearances and goals as of 19 January 2026

Ghaith Ouahabi (Arabic: غيث الوهابي; born 2 May 2003) is a Tunisian professional footballer who plays as a midfielder and central defender.
