= AS Soliman =

Tunisian football club

- Full name: Avenir Sportif de Soliman
- Founded: 1960
- Ground: Soliman Municipal Stadium
- Capacity: 3,000
- Chairman: Amine Libersou
- Manager: Amine Kammoun
- League: Tunisian Ligue Professionnelle 2
- 2025–26: Ligue 1, 15th of 16 (relegated)
- Website: https://assoliman.footeo.com/
colours

Avenir Sportif de Soliman (Arabic: المستقبل الرياضي بسليمان), known as AS Soliman or simply ASS for short, is a Tunisian football club based in Soliman. The club was founded in 1960 and its colours are green and white. Their home stadium, Soliman Municipal Stadium, has a capacity of 3,000 spectators. The club is currently playing in the Tunisian Ligue Professionnelle 1.

== History ==
The club earned promotion to the Tunisian Ligue Professionnelle 1 after finishing first in Group A of the 2018–19 Tunisian Ligue Professionnelle 1 season. Since then, AS Soliman has competed in the top tier, achieving the following league finishes:

- 2019–20: 9th place (out of 14)
- 2020–21: 4th place (out of 14) – their best finish to date
- 2021–22: 10th place (out of 16)
- 2022–23: 11th place (out of 16)
- 2023–24: 13th place (out of 14)

AS Soliman has had mixed performances in the league, with its best finish coming in the 2020–21 season.

== Management History ==
- Mohamed Tlemcani (since 5 December 2024) – ongoing
- Souhaieb Zarrouk (22 July 2024 – 5 December 2024) – 5 months, 14 days
- Fakhreddine Galbi (6 May 2024 – 16 June 2024) – 1 month, 10 days

== Current squad ==
As of 2 February 2025

Note: Flags indicate national team as defined under FIFA eligibility rules; some limited exceptions apply. Players may hold more than one non-FIFA nationality.

No.	Pos.	Nation	Player
1	GK	TUN	Moez Ben Cherifia
3	DF	TUN	Mohamed Firas Amri
6	MF	TUN	Mohamed Amine Ammar
7	DF	TUN	Helmi Jouidi
8	MF	TUN	Yacine El Kassah
9	FW	TUN	Dhiaeddine Jebli
10	FW	FRA	Manoubi Haddad
11	FW	ALG	Fares Belaili
13	GK	TUN	Mohamed Aziz Nsibi
15	DF	TUN	Mohamed Aziz Boucetta
17	DF	TUN	Ghassen Maatougui

No.	Pos.	Nation	Player
18	MF	TUN	Ahmed Mouati
19	MF	TUN	Anouar Debbiche
21	MF	TUN	Yacine El Kassah
25	DF	TUN	Amenallah El Majhed
27	FW	TUN	Jasser Yaakoubi
28	DF	FRA	Mouhamadou Konaté
31	DF	TUN	Oussama Hichri
32	MF	TUN	Mohamed Aziz Rebai
—	FW	TUN	Sajed Ferchichi
—	FW	GAM	Kebba Sowe
