= 2024–25 Espérance Sportive de Tunis season =

Espérance de Tunis
2024–25 season
- President: Hamdi Meddeb
- Head coach: Miguel Cardoso (until 22 October); Skander Kasri (caretaker, from 22 October to 10 November); Laurențiu Reghecampf (from 10 November to 17 March); Maher Kanzari (from 17 March)
- Stadium: Hammadi Agrebi Stadium
- Ligue 1: Winners
- Tunisian Cup: Winners
- Tunisian Super Cup: Winners
- CAF Champions League: Quarter-finals
- FIFA Club World Cup: Group stage
- Top goalscorer: League: Yan Sasse (10); All: Youcef Belaïli (20)
- Biggest win: Espérance de Tunis 8–0 Dekedaha (21 September 2024)
- Biggest defeat: Espérance de Tunis 0–3 Chelsea (24 June 2025)
Home colours	Away colours	Third colours

The 2024–25 Espérance Sportive de Tunis season was the 106th season in existence and the club's 70th consecutive season in the top flight of Tunisian football.

In addition to the domestic league, Espérance de Tunis participated in this season editions of the Tunisian Cup, the Tunisian Super Cup, the CAF Champions League and the FIFA Club World Cup.

On the domestic front, Espérance de Tunis won all possible titles, achieving the league and cup double for the first time since 2010–11 season, in addition to the Tunisian Super Cup. On the continental front, Espérance de Tunis left the Champions League from the quarter-finals after a 1–0 loss to Mamelodi Sundowns on aggregate. In the World Cup, Espérance de Tunis left the competition in the group stage with two defeats and one win.

== Kits ==
Home	Home alt.	Away	Third

2025–26 home (Note: This kit was only worn in the FIFA Club World Cup.)	2025–26 away

== Squad list ==
Note: Flags indicate the national team, defined under FIFA eligibility rules. Players may hold more than one non-FIFA nationality.

Staff

- (Tunisia) Chamseddine Dhaouadi (assistant manager)
- (Tunisia) Sami Zommit (assistant manager) (from 17 March)
- (Tunisia) Ghassen Bouchareb (assistant manager) (from 17 March)
- (France) Léo Djaoui (fitness manager) (from 24 November)
- (Algeria) Walid Charchari (Analyst) (from 24 November)
- (Tunisia) Yassine Ben Ahmed (doctor)
- (Romania) Viorel Dinu (assistant manager) (from 10 November to 17 March)
- (Romania) Daniel Zdranca (goalkeeper manager) (from 10 November to 17 March)
- (Romania) Bogdan Merișanu (fitness manager) (from 10 November to 17 March)
- (Tunisia) Skander Kasri (Vice manager) (from 10 to 29 November)
- (Portugal) Fábio Fernandes (assistant manager) (until 22 October)
- (Tunisia) Wassim Naouara (goalkeeper manager) (until 22 October)
- (Portugal) Carlos Miguel Silva (fitness manager) (until 22 October)
- (Tunisia) Mohamed Sabri Bouazizi (fitness manager) (until 22 October)
- (Portugal) Pedro Azevedo (Analyst) (until 22 October)
- (Portugal) João Araújo (Analyst) (until 22 October)

Other players under contract

- (France) Bilel Sahli
- (Tunisia) Raed Fedaa
- (Tunisia) Wassim Karoui

No.	Nat.	Name	Date of birth (age)	Since	Signed from
Goalkeepers
1	(Tunisia)	Amenallah Memmiche	20 April 2004 (aged 21)	2023	(Tunisia) Youth system
16	(Tunisia)	Mokhtar Ifaoui	2 March 2003 (aged 22)	2025	(Tunisia) Youth system
26	(Tunisia)	Mohamed Sedki Debchi	28 October 1999 (aged 25)	2019	(Tunisia) AS Gabès
32	(Tunisia)	Bechir Ben Saïd	29 November 1992 (aged 32)	2024	(Tunisia) US Monastir
Defenders
2	(Tunisia)	Mohamed Ben Ali	16 February 1995 (aged 30)	2022	(Tunisia) CS Sfaxien
3	(Tunisia)	Koussay Smiri	17 July 2004 (aged 20)	2024	(Tunisia) Youth system
5	(Tunisia)	Yassine Meriah (C)	2 July 1993 (aged 31)	2022	(United Arab Emirates) Al Ain
6	(Tunisia)	Hamza Jelassi	29 September 1991 (aged 33)	2024	(Tunisia) Étoile du Sahel
13	(Tunisia)	Raed Bouchniba	25 September 2003 (aged 21)	2022	(Tunisia) Youth system
15	(Algeria)	Mohamed Amine Tougai	22 January 2000 (aged 25)	2020	(Algeria) NA Hussein Dey
20	(Tunisia)	Mohamed Amine Ben Hamida	15 December 1995 (aged 29)	2016	(Tunisia) Youth system
22	(Tunisia)	Ayman Ben Mohamed	8 December 1994 (aged 30)	2024	(France) Guingamp
25	(Sweden)	Elyas Bouzaiene	8 September 1997 (aged 27)	2024	(Sweden) Västerås SK
34	(Tunisia)	Mohamed Aloui	17 July 2004 (aged 20)	2025	(Tunisia) Youth system
35	(Tunisia)	Aziz Koudhai	7 August 2004 (aged 20)	2024	(Tunisia) Youth system
Midfielders
4	(Tunisia)	Wael Derbali	18 June 2003 (aged 22)	2023	(Tunisia) Olympique Béja
8	(Tunisia)	Houssem Tka	16 August 2000 (aged 24)	2023	(Tunisia) US Monastir
10	(Brazil)	Yan Sasse	24 June 1997 (aged 28)	2023	(New Zealand) Wellington Phoenix
12	(Tunisia)	Haytham Dhaou	1 January 2005 (aged 20)	2024	(Tunisia) Youth system
14	(Nigeria)	Onuche Ogbelu	10 May 2003 (aged 22)	2023	(Nigeria) Nasarawa United
17	(Tunisia)	Zakaria El Ayeb	15 January 2003 (aged 22)	2023	(Tunisia) Youth system
18	(Togo)	Roger Aholou	30 December 1993 (aged 31)	2024	(Morocco) Raja CA
21	(Ivory Coast)	Abdramane Konaté	25 June 2006 (aged 18)	2024	(Ivory Coast) San Pédro
23	(Tunisia)	Larry Azouni	23 March 1994 (aged 31)	2024	(Saudi Arabia) Al Faisaly
31	(Tunisia)	Wajdi Issaoui	8 January 2005 (aged 20)	2024	(Tunisia) Youth system
36	(Tunisia)	Chiheb Jebali	26 May 1996 (aged 29)	2025	(Tunisia) US Monastir
37	(Belgium)	Mohamed Mouhli	13 September 1998 (aged 26)	2025	(Belgium) RFC Liège
38	(Tunisia)	Khalil Guenichi	11 December 2002 (aged 22)	2022	(Tunisia) Youth system
Forwards
9	(Brazil)	Rodrigo Rodrigues	18 June 1996 (aged 29)	2023	(Brazil) Juventude
11	(Algeria)	Youcef Belaïli	14 March 1992 (aged 33)	2024	(Algeria) MC Alger
19	(Tunisia)	Achref Jabri	16 December 2001 (aged 23)	2022	(Tunisia) Youth system
24	(South Africa)	Elias Mokwana	25 July 1999 (aged 25)	2024	(South Africa) Sekhukhune United
28	(Tunisia)	Zinedine Kada	1 August 2005 (aged 19)	2024	(Tunisia) Youth system
30	(Tunisia)	Koussay Maacha	21 May 2007 (aged 18)	2024	(Tunisia) Youth system
33	(Tunisia)	Amenallah Frikhi	12 February 2004 (aged 21)	2024	(Tunisia) Youth system
39	(Tunisia)	Rayen Hamrouni	29 January 2003 (aged 22)	2023	(Tunisia) Youth system
40	(Mali)	Aboubacar Diakité	31 December 2006 (aged 18)	2025	(Mali) Djoliba
Manager	(Tunisia)	Maher Kanzari	17 March 1973 (aged 52)	2025	(Tunisia) Stade Tunisien

== Transfers ==
=== In ===
Date	Pos.	Name	From	Type	Source
1 July 2024	GK	(Tunisia) Wassim Karoui	(Tunisia) AS Soliman	End of loan	
4 July 2024	GK	(Tunisia) Bechir Ben Saïd	(Tunisia) US Monastir	Free transfer	
5 July 2024	DF	(Tunisia) Ayman Ben Mohamed	(France) Guingamp	Free transfer	
11 July 2024	FW	(Tunisia) Youssef Abdelli	(Tunisia) Étoile du Sahel	Free transfer	
24 July 2024	DF	(Tunisia) Hamza Jelassi	(Tunisia) Étoile du Sahel	Free transfer	
31 July 2024	FW	(Algeria) Youcef Belaïli	(Algeria) MC Alger	Transfer	
1 August 2024	MF	(Tunisia) Mootez Zaddem	(Egypt) Al Masry	End of loan	
1 August 2024	FW	(South Africa) Elias Mokwana	(South Africa) Sekhukhune United	Transfer	
6 August 2024	MF	(Tunisia) Larry Azouni	(Saudi Arabia) Al Faisaly	Free transfer	
7 August 2024	MF	(Ivory Coast) Abdramane Konaté	(Ivory Coast) San Pédro	Transfer	
27 December 2024	DF	(Sweden) Elyas Bouzaiene	(Sweden) Västerås SK	Transfer	
2 January 2025	FW	(Tunisia) Achref Jabri	(Tunisia) Espérance de Zarzis	End of loan	
14 January 2025	FW	(Tunisia) Rayen Hamrouni	(Tunisia) AS Soliman	End of loan	—
28 January 2025	MF	(Belgium) Mohamed Mouhli	(Belgium) RFC Liège	Transfer	
30 January 2025	MF	(Tunisia) Khalil Guenichi	(Tunisia) Espérance de Zarzis	End of loan	
31 January 2025	FW	(Mali) Aboubacar Diakité	(Mali) Djoliba	Transfer	
31 January 2025	MF	(Tunisia) Chiheb Jebali	(Tunisia) US Monastir	Transfer	

=== Out ===
Date	Pos.	Name	To	Type	Source
1 July 2024	FW	(Tunisia) Zied Berrima	(Tunisia) Stade Tunisien	End of contract	
1 July 2024	GK	(Tunisia) Moez Ben Cherifia	(Tunisia) Olympique Béja	End of contract	
1 July 2024	MF	(Tunisia) Ghailene Chaalali	(Libya) Al Ahli Tripoli	End of contract	
1 July 2024	DF	(Tunisia) Hani Amamou	(Morocco) Raja CA	End of contract	
1 July 2024	DF	(Tunisia) Zied Machmoum	(Tunisia) US Ben Guerdane	End of contract	—
1 July 2024	MF	(Tunisia) Wael Chaieb	Free agent	End of contract	—
4 July 2024	FW	(Democratic Republic of the Congo) André Bukia	(Portugal) Alverca	Mutual termination	
18 July 2024	FW	(Algeria) Houssam Ghacha	(Algeria) USM Alger	Transfer	
1 August 2024	FW	(Tunisia) Mouhib Selmi	(Tunisia) AS Gabès	Transfer	
2 August 2024	DF	(Tunisia) Oussama Shili	(Tunisia) Club Africain	Mutual termination	
28 August 2024	FW	(Tunisia) Achref Jabri	(Tunisia) Espérance de Zarzis	Loan	
28 August 2024	DF	(Tunisia) Ghassen Mahersi	(Tunisia) Espérance de Zarzis	Transfer	
28 August 2024	MF	(Tunisia) Khalil Guenichi	(Tunisia) Espérance de Zarzis	Loan	
18 September 2024	MF	(Tunisia) Aziz Fellah	(Tunisia) AS Gabès	Loan	
19 September 2024	FW	(Tunisia) Aziz Abid	(Tunisia) Olympique Béja	Mutual termination	
20 September 2024	MF	(Tunisia) Khairi Meddaoui	(Tunisia) Stade Gabèsien	Loan	
20 September 2024	DF	(Tunisia) Aziz Knani	(Tunisia) Olympique Béja	Loan	
21 September 2024	MF	(Tunisia) Montassar Triki	(Tunisia) AS Soliman	Loan	
21 September 2024	GK	(Tunisia) Hamza Ghanmi	(Tunisia) AS Soliman	Transfer	
21 September 2024	FW	(Tunisia) Rayen Hamrouni	(Tunisia) AS Soliman	Loan	
21 September 2024	FW	(Tunisia) Salmen Trabelsi	(Tunisia) AS Soliman	Loan	
21 September 2024	DF	(Tunisia) Amenallah Majhed	(Tunisia) AS Soliman	Loan	
5 October 2024	FW	(Tunisia) Mohamed Ali Ben Hammouda	(Egypt) Ghazl El Mahalla	Transfer	
20 January 2025	MF	(Tunisia) Ghaith Ouahabi	(Georgia (country)) Dinamo Batumi	Loan	
24 January 2025	MF	(Tunisia) Mootez Zaddem	(Egypt) Modern Sport	Loan	
29 January 2025	FW	(Algeria) Riad Benayad	(Algeria) USM Alger	Free transfer	
30 January 2025	FW	(Tunisia) Youssef Abdelli	(Tunisia) US Monastir	Free transfer	
31 January 2025	FW	(The Gambia) Kebba Sowe	(Saudi Arabia) Al Kholood	Loan	—
1 February 2025	FW	(Tunisia) Oussama Bouguerra	(Saudi Arabia) Al Batin	Loan	
16 February 2025	DF	(Tunisia) Zinedine Sassi	(Qatar) Al Waab	Free transfer	—

== Friendlies ==
27 July 2024 Friendly	Espérance de Tunis	11–0	JS Soukra	Tunis
19:00	Ogbelu 8'; Ben Ali 15'; Tka 23'; Kada 25', 40', 45'; Sasse 43'; Sowe 54', 66'; Dhaou 68'; Majhed 81'			Stadium: Espérance de Tunis Training Center; Referee: Majdi Bellagha

31 July 2024 Friendly	Espérance de Tunis	10–0	AS Soukra	Tunis
19:00	Sasse 7'; Tougai 15'; Sowe 37'; Kada 47', 66'; Jabri 69', 80', 90'; Bouchniba 75'; A. Derbali 90+4'			Stadium: Espérance de Tunis Training Center; Referee: Walid Ouni

3 August 2024 Friendly	Espérance de Tunis	4–1	AS Oued Ellil	Tunis
19:00	Maacha 8', 33'; Kada 59'; Abdelli 72'		Harrak 24'	Stadium: Espérance de Tunis Training Center; Referee: Chamseddine Dhaouadi

10 August 2024 Friendly	Espérance de Tunis	2–0	AS Gabès	Tabarka
17:00	Bouchniba 23'; Sasse 38'			Stadium: La Cigale; Referee: Ali Ouerhani

14 August 2024 Friendly	Espérance de Tunis	3–0	AS Nefza	Tabarka
17:00				Stadium: La Cigale

17 August 2024 Friendly	Espérance de Tunis	1–0	Olympique Béja	Tabarka
17:00	Sasse 15'			Stadium: La Cigale; Referee: Khaled Gouider

22 August 2024 Friendly	Espérance de Tunis	2–0	CS Korba	Tunis
18:00	Sasse 80'; Jelassi 83' (pen.)			Stadium: Espérance de Tunis Training Center; Attendance: 0 (close doors)

24 August 2024 Friendly	Espérance de Tunis	2–0	AS Soliman	Tunis
18:00	Abdelli 4'; Sasse 24'			Stadium: Espérance de Tunis Training Center; Attendance: 0 (close doors); Referee: Khaled Trabelsi

1 September 2024 Friendly	Espérance de Tunis	1–1	Association Mégrine	Tunis
10:00				Stadium: Espérance de Tunis Training Center; Attendance: 0 (close doors)

8 September 2024 Friendly	Espérance de Tunis	9–1	SA Menzel Bourguiba	Tunis
19:00	Konaté 2', 19'; Belaïli 36', 52'; Sowe 45', 54'; Azouni 82' (pen.); Bououn 88'; Aloui 90'			Stadium: Espérance de Tunis Training Center; Attendance: 0 (close doors); Referee: Khaled Gouider

13 October 2024 Friendly	Espérance de Tunis	1–0	AS Soliman	Tunis
17:00	Azouni			Stadium: Espérance de Tunis Training Center; Attendance: 0 (close doors)

22 March 2025 Friendly	Espérance de Tunis	2–0	AS Marsa	Tunis
22:00	Koudhai 5'; Smiri 27'			Stadium: Chedly Zouiten Stadium; Referee: Nizar Riahi

25 March 2025 Friendly	Espérance de Tunis	5–3	CA Bizertin	Tunis
22:00	Sasse; Diakité; Jebali; Hamrouni		Seydi (pen.) (pen.); Khelifi	Stadium: Chedly Zouiten Stadium; Referee: Houssem Ben Sassi

== Competitions ==
=== Overview ===
Competition	Record								Starting round	Final position / round	First match	Last match
Competition	G	W	D	L	GF	GA	GD	Win %	Starting round	Final position / round	First match	Last match
Ligue 1	30	19	9	2	57	22	+35	63.33	—N/a	Winners	31 August 2024	15 May 2025
Tunisian Cup	5	5	0	0	17	1	+16	100.00	Round of 32	Winners	16 April 2025	1 June 2025
Tunisian Super Cup	1	1	0	0	2	0	+2	100.00	Final	Winners	16 February 2025	
CAF Champions League	10	6	2	2	24	5	+19	60.00	Second round	Quarter-finals	15 September 2024	8 April 2025
FIFA Club World Cup	3	1	0	2	1	5	−4	33.33	Group stage		16 June 2025	24 June 2025
Total	49	32	11	6	101	33	+68	65.31			31 August 2024	24 June 2025

Source: Competitions

=== Ligue 1 ===
The draw was held on 15 August 2024.

==== League table ====
Pos	Team	Pld	W	D	L	GF	GA	GD	Pts	Qualification or relegation
1	Espérance de Tunis (C)	30	19	9	2	57	22	+35	66	Qualification for the Champions League
2	US Monastir	30	17	11	2	42	11	+31	62	Qualification for the Champions League
3	Étoile du Sahel	30	19	4	7	45	24	+21	61	Qualification for the Confederation Cup
4	Club Africain	30	15	9	6	34	19	+15	54 (Note: Ranked on goal difference: Club Africain +15, Espérance de Zarzis +9.)	
5	Espérance de Zarzis	30	16	6	8	38	29	+9	54	

Source: Tunisian Football Federation
Rules for classification: 1) points; 2) head-to-head points; 3) head-to-head goal difference; 4) goal difference; 5) total goals; 6) fairplay ranking; 7) playoff.
(C) Champions

==== Results by round ====
Round	1	2	3	4	5	6	7	8	9	10	11	12	13	14	15	16	17	18	19	20	21	22	23	24	25	26	27	28	29	30
Ground	H	A	H	A	A	H	A	H	A	H	A	H	A	H	A	A	H	A	H	H	A	H	A	H	A	H	A	H	A	H
Result	W	W	D	D	L	D	W	W	D	W	W	D	W	D	W	W	W	W	W	W	L	W	W	D	D	W	W	W	W	D
Position	1	1	4	4	6	7	6	5	6	5	5	5	4	5	4	2	1	1	1	1	1	1	1	1	1	1	1	1	1	1
Points	3	6	7	8	8	9	12	15	16	19	22	23	26	27	30	33	36	39	42	45	45	48	51	52	53	56	59	62	65	66

Source: Competitive matches
A = Away; H = Home; W = Win; D = Draw; L = Loss

==== Matches ====
31 August 2024 Round 1	Espérance de Tunis	3–0	US Tataouine	Tunis
19:00	Ben Hamida 6'; Belaïli 45'; Sasse 45+2'	Report	Maaroufi (yellow card) 10'; Sekrafi (yellow card) 83'; Arbi (yellow card) 84'	Stadium: Hammadi Agrebi Stadium; Referee: Fredj Abdellaoui

25 September 2024 Round 2	AS Soliman	1–2	Espérance de Tunis	Korba
15:30	Foning 17', (yellow card) 62'; Ahouangbo (yellow card) 56'; Majhed (yellow card) 75'	Report	Ghouma 39' (o.g.); Bouchniba (yellow card) 52'; Konaté 66'	Stadium: Korba Municipal Stadium; Referee: Haithem Trabelsi

29 September 2024 Round 3	Espérance de Tunis	2–2	Stade Tunisien	Tunis
17:30	Belaïli (yellow card) 36'; Meriah 53' (pen.); Kada 62'	Report	Arous (yellow card) 31'; Oumarou 33', 42', (yellow card) 90+1'; Khalfa (yellow card) 36'; Touré (yellow card) 76'; Ndaw (yellow card) 81'	Stadium: Hammadi Agrebi Stadium; Referee: Seif Ouertani

3 October 2024 Round 4	ES Métlaoui	1–1	Espérance de Tunis	Métlaoui
15:00	Ammar (yellow card) 8'; Arfaoui (yellow card) 45+3'; Khalifa (yellow card) 78', (goal) 90+1'; Mhamdi (red card) 84'; Hermes (yellow card) 87'	Report	Meriah (yellow card) 45+3', (goal) 81'; Azouni (yellow card) 73'; Memmiche (yellow card) 85'	Stadium: Métlaoui Municipal Stadium; Referee: Badis Ben Salah

20 October 2024 Round 5	Espérance de Zarzis	1–0	Espérance de Tunis	Zarzis
15:00	Charfi (yellow card) 3'; Dhaflaoui 17'; Romdhane (yellow card) 36'; Khalfa (yellow card) 43'; Ochigbo (yellow card) 76'; Rahmani (yellow card) 90+4'	Report	Bouguerra (yellow card) 56'	Stadium: Abdessalam Kazouz Stadium; Referee: Amir Ayadi

26 October 2024 Round 6	Espérance de Tunis	0–0	CA Bizertin	Tunis
17:30	Meriah (penalty missed) 80'	Report	Guesmi (yellow card) 64'; Seydi (yellow card) 79'; Cissoko (yellow card) 90+4'	Stadium: Hammadi Agrebi Stadium; Referee: Amir Loussif

3 November 2024 Round 7	Étoile du Sahel	0–2	Espérance de Tunis	Sousse
	Gbo (yellow card) 14'; Aouani (yellow card) 32'; Ouertani (yellow card) 50'	Report	Boughattas 63' (o.g.); Memmiche (yellow card) 76'; Mokwana 88'	Stadium: Sousse Olympic Stadium; Referee: Nidhal Letaief

9 November 2024 Round 8	Espérance de Tunis	2–1	AS Gabès	Tunis
16:30	Bouchniba 19'; Maacha 44', (yellow card) 45'	Report	Camara 34'	Stadium: Hammadi Agrebi Stadium; Referee: Sadok Selmi

22 November 2024 Round 9	US Ben Guerdane	1–1	Espérance de Tunis	Ben Guerdane
14:00	Habbassi 10'; Yeken (yellow card) 19'; Touis (yellow card) 26'; Taous (yellow card) 49'	Report	Bouchniba (yellow card) 54'; Belaïli 59'	Stadium: 7 March Stadium; Referee: Houssem Boularesse

1 December 2024 Round 10	Espérance de Tunis	2–0	JS El Omrane	Tunis
16:30	Rodrigues 31' (pen.), 56'; Aholou (yellow card) 60'	Report	Zoghlami (yellow card) 12'; Omri (yellow card) 58'	Stadium: Hammadi Agrebi Stadium; Referee: Fredj Abdellaoui

22 December 2024 Round 12	Espérance de Tunis	2–2	Club Africain	Tunis
16:30	Sasse 38'; Tougai 44'; Belaïli (yellow card) 71'; Bouchniba (yellow card) 90+1'	Report	Youssef 8', (yellow card) 90+7'; Ben Abda (yellow card) 42'; Bouabid 82'; Labidi (yellow card) 83'	Stadium: Hammadi Agrebi Stadium; Referee: Luis Godinho (Portugal)

25 December 2024 Round 11	EGS Gafsa	0–3	Espérance de Tunis	Gafsa
14:00	Haz. Mbarek (yellow card) 38'; Mhamdi (yellow card) 40'; Omrani (yellow card) 78'; Bangoura (yellow card) 83'	Report	Kada 28'; Mokwana 59', (yellow card) 90'; Smiri (yellow card) 78'; Sowe 90+1'	Stadium: Mohamed Rouached Stadium; Referee: Houssem Boularesse

29 December 2024 Round 13	CS Sfaxien	0–1	Espérance de Tunis	Sfax
14:00		Report	Kada (yellow card) 31'; Belaïli (yellow card) 41'; Maacha (yellow card) 71'; Konaté 86'	Stadium: Taieb Mhiri Stadium; Referee: Yosri Bouali

22 January 2025 Round 14	Espérance de Tunis	1–1	Olympique Béja	Tunis
14:00	Tka (yellow card) 43'; Maacha 69'; Belaïli (yellow card) 61'; Tougai (yellow card) 89'; Ben Ali (yellow card) 90+7'	Report	Chelghoumi (yellow card) 29' (yellow-red card) 80'; Cherni 45+2'; Mtiri (yellow card) 45+8'; Dhaoui (yellow card) 72'; Smaoui (yellow card) 90+7'	Stadium: Hammadi Agrebi Stadium; Referee: Montassar Belarbi

26 January 2025 Round 15	US Monastir	0–2	Espérance de Tunis	Monastir
14:00	Orkuma (yellow card) 20'; Ganouni (yellow card) 34'; Azzouz (yellow card) 42'	Report	Jelassi (yellow card) 39'; Konaté (yellow card) 45+3'; Belaïli 68', (yellow card) 69'; Memmiche (yellow card) 83'; Sasse (yellow card) 90+3'; Bouchniba 90+9'	Stadium: Mustapha Ben Jannet Stadium; Referee: Mahmoud Bassiouni (Egypt)

29 January 2025 Round 16	US Tataouine	0–2	Espérance de Tunis	Tataouine
14:00	Keita (yellow card) 24'; Glele (yellow card) 75'; Timi (yellow card) 79'	Report	Aholou (yellow card) 24'; Ben Hamida 33'; Jabri 45+1'	Stadium: Nejib Khattab Stadium; Referee: Khaled Gouider

2 February 2025 Round 17	Espérance de Tunis	4–2	AS Soliman	Tunis
14:00	Tka 18'; Belaïli 37' (pen.), (yellow card) 73'; Ben Hamida 45+1'; Diakité (yellow card) 64'; Sasse 68'	Report	Maatougui 33'; Majhed 39'	Stadium: Hammadi Agrebi Stadium; Referee: Yosri Bouali

8 February 2025 Round 18	Stade Tunisien	0–1	Espérance de Tunis	Tunis
14:00	Ayari (yellow card) 47'; Touré (yellow card) 53'	Report	Jelassi (yellow card) 35'; Tougai 58'; Belaïli (yellow card) 61'	Stadium: Hédi Enneifer Stadium; Referee: Mehrez Melki

12 February 2025 Round 19	Espérance de Tunis	3–2	ES Métlaoui	Tunis
14:00	Bouzaiene (yellow card) 21'; Sasse 50' (pen.); Khalifa 52' (o.g.); Ogbelu (yellow card) 57'; Jabri 75'	Report	Bouassida 22'; Bah (yellow card) 24'; Lingazou (yellow card) 37'; Ammar (yellow card) 59'; Knaissi 81'	Stadium: Hammadi Agrebi Stadium; Attendance: 0 (close doors); Referee: Ahmed Dhaouadi

19 February 2025 Round 20	Espérance de Tunis	4–2	Espérance de Zarzis	Tunis
14:00	Guenichi (yellow card) 8'; Belaïli 33' (pen.); Jabri 45+5'; Ogbelu 81'; Tougai 85'	Report	Snana 22'; Coumbassa (yellow card) 24'; Rached 27'; Diallo (yellow card) 28'; Rjili (red card) 28'; Romdhane (yellow card) 62'	Stadium: Hammadi Agrebi Stadium; Referee: Naim Hosni

22 February 2025 Round 21	CA Bizertin	2–1	Espérance de Tunis	Bizerte
14:00	Memmiche 27' (o.g.); Y. Mechergui (yellow card) 65'; Fellahi (yellow card) 90+6'; Seydi 90+13' (pen.)	Report	Sasse (yellow card) 18'; Jebali 50'; Tougai (penalty missed) 65', (yellow card) 90+11'; Smiri (red card) 88'; Guenichi (red card) 90+10'	Stadium: 15 October Stadium; Referee: Haythem Kossai

26 February 2025 Round 22	Espérance de Tunis	3–0	Étoile du Sahel	Tunis
14:00	Belaïli (yellow card) 8', (goal) 14'; Jelassi 29'; Bouchniba 47'	Report	Ben Choug (yellow card) 23'; Ben Ali (yellow card) 25'; Chaouat (penalty missed) 54'; Abid (yellow card) 80'; Souissi (yellow card) 90+2'	Stadium: Hammadi Agrebi Stadium; Referee: Luis Godinho (Portugal)

1 March 2025 Round 23	AS Gabès	0–2	Espérance de Tunis	Gabès
14:00	Salem (yellow card) 51'; Maatougui (yellow card) 58'; Ben Amor (yellow card) 78'	Report	Sasse 25', 32'; Diakité (yellow card) 66'; Ogbelu (yellow card) 82'	Stadium: Gabès Municipal Stadium; Referee: Mohamed Maarouf (Egypt)

8 March 2025 Round 24	Espérance de Tunis	1–1	US Ben Guerdane	Tunis
14:00	Belaïli (yellow card) 34', (goal) 89' (pen.); Guenichi (yellow card) 69'; Ben Hamida (yellow card) 86'	Report	Belwafi 14'; Chaabane (yellow card) 22'; Taous (yellow card) 34' (yellow-red card) 87'; Banga (yellow card) 40'; Machmoum (yellow card) 90+9'	Stadium: Hammadi Agrebi Stadium; Referee: Khaled Gouider

12 March 2025 Round 25	JS El Omrane	2–2	Espérance de Tunis	Tunis
14:00	Souissi (yellow card) 21'; Mahdouani (yellow card) 29'; Jammel (yellow card) 40'; Zouaghi 75', (yellow card) 76'; Essid (yellow card) 78'; Khemissi 90+8', (yellow card) 90+8'	Report	Kada (yellow card) 29'; Belaïli (penalty missed) 70', 70'; Jelassi (yellow card) 74'; Sasse 83', (yellow card) 84'; Ogbelu (yellow card) 86'; Diakité (yellow card) 90'	Stadium: Chedly Zouiten Stadium; Referee: Ahmed El Ghandour (Egypt)

13 April 2025 Round 26	Espérance de Tunis	1–0	EGS Gafsa	Tunis
14:30	Rodrigues 32'; Jebali (yellow card) 47'	Report	Mejri (yellow card) 29'	Stadium: Hammadi Agrebi Stadium; Referee: Oussama Ben Ishak

20 April 2025 Round 27	Club Africain	1–3	Espérance de Tunis	Tunis
16:00	Khalil (yellow card) 21'; Labidi 45+2' (pen.); Yeferni (red card) 59'; G. Sghaier (yellow card) 67'	Report	Jelassi 12', (yellow card) 62'; Ogbelu (yellow card) 32'; Sasse (yellow card) 69'; Ben Ali (yellow card) 75'; Rodrigues 85' (pen.); Ben Hamida (yellow card) 88'; Jabri 90+2'	Stadium: Hammadi Agrebi Stadium; Referee: Luis Godinho (Portugal)

3 May 2025 Round 28	Espérance de Tunis	1–0	CS Sfaxien	Tunis
15:00	Sasse 17'; Derbali (yellow card) 37'; Ben Hamida (yellow card) 85'; Belaïli (yellow card) 86'; Tougai (yellow card) 90+6'	Report	Absi (yellow card) 32' (yellow-red card) 79'	Stadium: Hammadi Agrebi Stadium; Referee: Naim Hosni

11 May 2025 Round 29	Olympique Béja	0–5	Espérance de Tunis	El Kef
15:00		Report	Sasse 7', 43'; Belaïli 57'; Tka 68'; Mokwana 78'	Stadium: EL Kef Stadium; Referee: Nidhal Letaief

15 May 2025 Round 30	Espérance de Tunis	0–0	US Monastir	Tunis
16:00		Report	Harzi (yellow card) 28'; Azzouz (yellow card) 38'	Stadium: Hammadi Agrebi Stadium; Referee: Houssem Boularesse

==== Results summary ====
Overall								Home						Away					
Pld	W	D	L	GF	GA	GD	Pts	W	D	L	GF	GA	GD	W	D	L	GF	GA	GD
30	19	9	2	57	22	+35	66	9	6	0	29	13	+16	10	3	2	28	9	+19

Source: Competitive matches

=== Tunisian Cup ===
Espérance de Tunis entered the tournament in the round of 32, as they were part of the 2024–25 Tunisian Ligue Professionnelle 1.

16 April 2025 Round of 32	Espérance de Tunis	6–0	AS Kasserine	Tunis
14:00	Azouni 28', 52'; Jabri 32', 42'; Issaoui 54'; Bouzaiene (yellow card) 79'; Derbali 86'	Report	Ltifi (yellow card) 27'; Delhoumi (red card) 90'	Stadium: Hammadi Agrebi Stadium; Referee: Majdi Bellagha

26 April 2025 Round of 16	CS Hammam-Lif	0–4	Espérance de Tunis	Tunis
14:30	Dridi (yellow card) 85'	Report	Derbali 38'; Mouhli 43'; Maacha 49'; Jelassi (yellow card) 70'; Koudhai 86'	Stadium: Bou Kornine Stadium; Referee: Seif Ouertani

18 May 2025 Quarter-finals	Espérance de Tunis	3–1	Espérance de Zarzis	Tunis
14:30	Belaïli 6'; Sasse 42'; Jabri 43'; Rodrigues (yellow card) 90+4'	Report	Khalfa (yellow card) 51'; Snana 74'; Coumbassa (yellow card) 85'	Stadium: Hammadi Agrebi Stadium; Referee: Walid Mansri

25 May 2025 Semi-finals	US Ben Guerdane	0–3	Espérance de Tunis	Ben Guerdane
15:30		Report	Belaïli 11'; Ogbelu (yellow card) 63'; Guenichi (yellow card) 67'; Sasse 68'; Rodrigues 90+2'	Stadium: 7 March Stadium; Referee: Fredj Abdellaoui

1 June 2025 Final	Espérance de Tunis	1–0	Stade Tunisien	Tunis
16:00	Jebali (yellow card) 49'; Ben Hamida (yellow card) 50'; Ogbelu 64', (yellow card) 90+6'	Report	Khalfa (yellow card) 25'; Ayari (yellow card) 39'; Helal (yellow card) 67'	Stadium: Hammadi Agrebi Stadium; Attendance: 30,000; Referee: Oussama Ben Ishak

=== Tunisian Super Cup ===
16 February 2025	Espérance de Tunis	2–0	Stade Tunisien	Tunis
15:00	Mokwana 59'; Belaïli 84'	Report		Stadium: Hammadi Agrebi Stadium; Attendance: 30,000; Referee: Mahmoud Nagy (Egypt)

=== CAF Champions League ===
==== Qualifying rounds ====
The draw of the qualifying rounds was held on 11 July 2024.

===== Second round =====
15 September 2024 First leg	Dekedaha (Somalia)	1–4	(Tunisia) Espérance de Tunis	Tunis (Tunisia)
17:00 UTC+1	Abdulle (yellow card) 26'; Adan (yellow card) 39'; Adepoju 45+2'	Report	Sasse 27'; Belaïli 50', 76'; Aholou (yellow card) 55'; Meriah 66'	Stadium: Hammadi Agrebi Stadium; Referee: Boubou Traoré (Mali)

21 September 2024 Second leg	Espérance de Tunis (Tunisia)	8–0 (12–1 agg.)	(Somalia) Dekedaha	Tunis
19:00 UTC+1	Sasse 7'; Sowe 12'; Belaïli 18', 45', 51'; Tougai 69' (pen.); Derbali 74'; Jelassi 78'	Report	Osman (yellow card) 30'; Panoam (yellow card) 80'	Stadium: Hammadi Agrebi Stadium; Referee: Aklesso Gnama (Togo)

==== Group stage ====
The draw of the group stage was held on 7 October 2024.

Group D

Pos	Team	Pld	W	D	L	GF	GA	GD	Pts	Qualification	EST	PYR	GDSE	DJO
1	(Tunisia) Espérance de Tunis	6	4	1	1	12	3	+9	13 (Note: Ranked on goal difference in head-to-head matches: Espérance de Tunis +1, Pyramids –1.)	Advance to knockout stage	—	2–0	4–1	4–0
2	(Egypt) Pyramids	6	4	1	1	14	4	+10	13	Advance to knockout stage	2–1	—	5–1	6–0
3	(Angola) Sagrada Esperança	6	1	2	3	3	10	−7	5		0–0	0–1	—	1–0
4	(Mali) Djoliba	6	0	2	4	0	12	−12	2		0–1	0–0	0–0	—

Source: CAF
Notes:

26 November 2024 Matchday 1	Espérance de Tunis (Tunisia)	4–0	(Mali) Djoliba	Tunis
20:00 UTC+1	Bouchniba 4'; Mokwana 40'; Bouguerra 76'; Ben Mohamed (yellow card) 78'; Maacha 90+5'	Report	Glougbe (yellow card) 59'; Sogoba (yellow card) 72'; Keita (yellow card) 86'	Stadium: Hammadi Agrebi Stadium; Referee: Abongile Tom (South Africa)

6 December 2024 Matchday 2	Sagrada Esperança (Angola)	0–0	(Tunisia) Espérance de Tunis	Luanda (Note: Sagrada Esperança played their home matches at Estádio 11 de Novembro, Luanda, instead of their regular stadium, Estádio Sagrada Esperança, Dundo, which did not meet CAF requirements.)
17:00 UTC+1	Diallo (yellow card) 40'; Doce (yellow card) 64'; Barbosa (yellow card) 83'; Papel (yellow card) 87'	Report	Tka (yellow card) 88'; Jelassi (yellow card) 90+2'	Stadium: Estádio 11 de Novembro; Referee: Omar Artan (Somalia)

14 December 2024 Matchday 3	Espérance de Tunis (Tunisia)	2–0	(Egypt) Pyramids	Tunis
20:00 UTC+1	Belaïli 36'; Mokwana 45+3'; Memmiche (yellow card) 77'	Report	Mayele (yellow card) 43'	Stadium: Hammadi Agrebi Stadium; Referee: Pacifique Ndabihawenimana (Burundi)

5 January 2025 Matchday 4	Pyramids (Egypt)	2–1	(Tunisia) Espérance de Tunis	Cairo
18:00 UTC+2	El Karti (yellow card) 21'; Gabr (yellow card) 87'; Fathi 90'; Adel 90+3', (yellow card) 90+3'	Report	Belaïli 56'; Ben Hamida (yellow card) 71'; Memmiche (yellow card) 86'	Stadium: 30 June Stadium; Referee: Messie Nkounkou (Congo)

12 January 2025 Matchday 5	Djoliba (Mali)	0–1	(Tunisia) Espérance de Tunis	Bamako
16:00 UTC+0	O. Diallo (yellow card) 45+1'; Dakouo (yellow card) 45+3'; Keita (yellow card) 78'	Report	Azouni (yellow card) 29'; Belaïli (yellow card) 29'; Mokwana (yellow card) 38', (goal) 67'	Stadium: Stade du 26 Mars; Referee: Pierre Atcho (Gabon)

18 January 2025 Matchday 6	Espérance de Tunis (Tunisia)	4–1	(Angola) Sagrada Esperança	Tunis
20:00 UTC+1	Jabri 16', 55', 59', (yellow card) 44'; Sasse 22'; Ben Ali (yellow card) 82'	Report	Lulas (yellow card) 23'; Dabanda 45+1'	Stadium: Hammadi Agrebi Stadium; Referee: Adalbert Diouf (Senegal)

==== Knockout stage ====
The draw of the knockout stage was held on 20 February 2025.

===== Quarter-finals =====
1 April 2025 First leg	Mamelodi Sundowns (South Africa)	1–0	(Tunisia) Espérance de Tunis	Pretoria
15:00 UTC+2	Mokoena (yellow card) 22'; Shalulile 54'	Report	Mokwana (yellow card) 66'; Belaïli (yellow card) 90+3'	Stadium: Loftus Versfeld Stadium; Attendance: 20,000; Referee: Jean-Jacques Ndala Ngambo (DR Congo)

8 April 2025 Second leg	Espérance de Tunis (Tunisia)	0–0 (0–1 agg.)	(South Africa) Mamelodi Sundowns	Tunis
20:00 UTC+1	Ogbelu (yellow card) 87'	Report	Kekana (yellow card) 49'; Shalulile (yellow card) 56'; Ribeiro (yellow card) 58'; Williams (yellow card) 81'	Stadium: Hammadi Agrebi Stadium; Attendance: 50,000; Referee: Issa Sy (Senegal)

=== FIFA Club World Cup ===
On 26 April 2024, Espérance de Tunis secured a slot in the FIFA Club World Cup via CAF 4-year ranking following a 1–0 away win against Mamelodi Sundowns. The draw was held on 5 December 2024.

==== Group stage ====
Pos	Team	Pld	W	D	L	GF	GA	GD	Pts	Qualification
1	(Brazil) Flamengo	3	2	1	0	6	2	+4	7	Advance to knockout stage
2	(England) Chelsea	3	2	0	1	6	3	+3	6	Advance to knockout stage
3	(Tunisia) Espérance de Tunis	3	1	0	2	1	5	−4	3	
4	(United States) Los Angeles FC	3	0	1	2	1	4	−3	1	

Source: FIFA

16 June 2025 Matchday 1	Flamengo (Brazil)	2–0	(Tunisia) Espérance de Tunis	Philadelphia, United States
21:00 UTC−4	De Arrascaeta 17'; Luiz Araújo 70'; Bruno Henrique (yellow card) 84'	Report	Ben Ali (yellow card) 25'; Belaïli (yellow card) 38'; Guenichi (yellow card) 64'; Tougai (yellow card) 69'	Stadium: Lincoln Financial Field; Attendance: 25,797; Referee: Danny Makkelie (Netherlands)

20 June 2025 Matchday 2	Los Angeles FC (United States)	0–1	(Tunisia) Espérance de Tunis	Nashville, United States
17:00 UTC−5	Tillman (yellow card) 23'; Bouanga (penalty missed) 90+11'	Report	Belaïli (yellow card) 53', (goal) 70'; Sasse (yellow card) 64'	Stadium: Geodis Park; Attendance: 13,651; Referee: Espen Eskås (Norway)

24 June 2025 Matchday 3	Espérance de Tunis (Tunisia)	0–3	(England) Chelsea	Philadelphia, United States
21:00 UTC−4	Derbali (yellow card) 87'; Ogbelu (yellow card) 90+2'; Ben Ali (yellow card) 90+6'	Report	Adarabioyo 45+3'; Delap 45+5'; George 90+7'	Stadium: Lincoln Financial Field; Attendance: 32,967; Referee: Yael Falcón Pérez (Argentina)

== Statistics ==
- ^{1} Includes Tunisian Super Cup and FIFA Club World Cup.
- ^{‡} Player played at least one game and left the club during the season.

=== Playing statistics ===
No.	Pos	Nat	Player	Total		Ligue 1		Tunisian Cup		CAF Champions League		Other^{1}	
No.	Pos	Nat	Player	Apps	Goals	Apps	Goals	Apps	Goals	Apps	Goals	Apps	Goals
1	GK	(Tunisia)	Amenallah Memmiche	31	0	23	0	2	0	5	0	1	0
2	DF	(Tunisia)	Mohamed Ben Ali	29	0	15	0	4	0	6	0	4	0
3	DF	(Tunisia)	Koussay Smiri	14	0	12	0	0	0	1	0	1	0
4	MF	(Tunisia)	Wael Derbali	20	3	11	0	5	2	1	1	3	0
5	DF	(Tunisia)	Yassine Meriah	16	3	9	2	1	0	3	1	3	0
6	DF	(Tunisia)	Hamza Jelassi	38	3	24	2	4	0	8	1	2	0
8	MF	(Tunisia)	Houssem Tka	40	2	27	2	1	0	10	0	2	0
9	FW	(Brazil)	Rodrigo Rodrigues	21	5	10	4	3	1	5	0	3	0
10	MF	(Brazil)	Yan Sasse	41	15	27	10	3	2	7	3	4	0
11	FW	(Algeria)	Youcef Belaïli	37	20	21	9	3	2	10	7	3	2
12	MF	(Tunisia)	Haytham Dhaou	5	0	2	0	3	0	0	0	0	0
13	DF	(Tunisia)	Raed Bouchniba	35	4	23	3	3	0	7	1	2	0
14	MF	(Nigeria)	Onuche Ogbelu	36	2	20	1	3	1	10	0	3	0
15	DF	(Algeria)	Mohamed Amine Tougai	33	4	17	3	3	0	9	1	4	0
16	GK	(Tunisia)	Mokhtar Ifaoui	1	0	1	0	0	0	0	0	0	0
17	MF	(Tunisia)	Zakaria El Ayeb	11	0	9	0	0	0	2	0	0	0
18	MF	(Togo)	Roger Aholou	19	0	12	0	0	0	7	0	0	0
19	FW	(Tunisia)	Achref Jabri	27	10	14	4	5	3	4	3	4	0
20	DF	(Tunisia)	Mohamed Amine Ben Hamida	46	3	28	3	4	0	10	0	4	0
21	MF	(Ivory Coast)	Abdramane Konaté	35	2	21	2	0	0	10	0	4	0
22	DF	(Tunisia)	Ayman Ben Mohamed	15	0	10	0	2	0	3	0	0	0
23	MF	(Tunisia)	Larry Azouni	19	2	12	0	2	2	4	0	1	0
24	FW	(South Africa)	Elias Mokwana	38	7	25	3	1	0	8	3	4	1
25	DF	(Sweden)	Elyas Bouzaiene	14	0	8	0	3	0	2	0	1	0
26	GK	(Tunisia)	Mohamed Sedki Debchi	1	0	1	0	0	0	0	0	0	0
28	FW	(Tunisia)	Zinedine Kada	11	2	10	2	0	0	1	0	0	0
30	FW	(Tunisia)	Koussay Maacha	17	4	10	2	2	1	5	1	0	0
31	MF	(Tunisia)	Wajdi Issaoui	1	1	0	0	1	1	0	0	0	0
32	GK	(Tunisia)	Bechir Ben Saïd	17	0	6	0	3	0	5	0	3	0
33	FW	(Tunisia)	Amenallah Frikhi	0	0	0	0	0	0	0	0	0	0
34	DF	(Tunisia)	Mohamed Aloui	0	0	0	0	0	0	0	0	0	0
35	DF	(Tunisia)	Aziz Koudhai	6	1	4	0	2	1	0	0	0	0
36	MF	(Tunisia)	Chiheb Jebali	23	1	13	1	5	0	2	0	3	0
37	MF	(Belgium)	Mohamed Mouhli	7	1	5	0	2	1	0	0	0	0
38	MF	(Tunisia)	Khalil Guenichi	21	0	11	0	5	0	1	0	4	0
39	FW	(Tunisia)	Rayen Hamrouni	7	0	3	0	3	0	1	0	0	0
40	FW	(Mali)	Aboubacar Diakité	7	0	7	0	0	0	0	0	0	0
‡	MF	(Tunisia)	Mootez Zaddem	2	0	2	0	0	0	0	0	0	0
‡	FW	(Tunisia)	Youssef Abdelli	7	0	6	0	0	0	1	0	0	0
‡	FW	(Tunisia)	Oussama Bouguerra	11	1	8	0	0	0	3	1	0	0
‡	FW	(The Gambia)	Kebba Sowe	7	2	4	1	0	0	3	1	0	0

Source: Competitions

=== Goals ===
Rank	No.	Pos	Nat	Player	Ligue 1	Tunisian Cup	CAF Champions League	Other^{1}	Total
1	11	FW	(Algeria)	Youcef Belaïli	9	2	7	2	20
2	10	MF	(Brazil)	Yan Sasse	10	2	3	0	15
3	19	FW	(Tunisia)	Achref Jabri	4	3	3	0	10
4	24	FW	(South Africa)	Elias Mokwana	3	0	3	1	7
5	9	FW	(Brazil)	Rodrigo Rodrigues	4	1	0	0	5
6	15	DF	(Algeria)	Mohamed Amine Tougai	3	0	1	0	4
6	13	DF	(Tunisia)	Raed Bouchniba	3	0	1	0	4
6	30	FW	(Tunisia)	Koussay Maacha	2	1	1	0	4
9	5	DF	(Tunisia)	Yassine Meriah	2	0	1	0	3
9	20	DF	(Tunisia)	Mohamed Amine Ben Hamida	3	0	0	0	3
9	6	DF	(Tunisia)	Hamza Jelassi	2	0	1	0	3
9	4	MF	(Tunisia)	Wael Derbali	0	2	1	0	3
13	28	FW	(Tunisia)	Zinedine Kada	2	0	0	0	2
13	‡	FW	(The Gambia)	Kebba Sowe	1	0	1	0	2
13	21	MF	(Ivory Coast)	Abdramane Konaté	2	0	0	0	2
13	23	MF	(Tunisia)	Larry Azouni	0	2	0	0	2
13	8	MF	(Tunisia)	Houssem Tka	2	0	0	0	2
13	14	MF	(Nigeria)	Onuche Ogbelu	1	1	0	0	2
19	‡	FW	(Tunisia)	Oussama Bouguerra	0	0	1	0	1
19	36	MF	(Tunisia)	Chiheb Jebali	1	0	0	0	1
19	31	MF	(Tunisia)	Wajdi Issaoui	0	1	0	0	1
19	37	MF	(Belgium)	Mohamed Mouhli	0	1	0	0	1
19	35	DF	(Tunisia)	Aziz Koudhai	0	1	0	0	1
Own goals					3	0	0	0	3
Total					57	17	24	3	101

=== Assists ===
Rank	No.	Pos	Nat	Player	Ligue 1	Tunisian Cup	CAF Champions League	Other^{1}	Total
1	11	FW	(Algeria)	Youcef Belaïli	5	1	7	0	13
2	36	MF	(Tunisia)	Chiheb Jebali	5	3	0	0	8
3	20	DF	(Tunisia)	Mohamed Amine Ben Hamida	4	0	1	1	6
4	8	MF	(Tunisia)	Houssem Tka	5	0	0	0	5
5	24	FW	(South Africa)	Elias Mokwana	2	0	2	0	4
5	2	DF	(Tunisia)	Mohamed Ben Ali	1	1	2	0	4
5	25	DF	(Sweden)	Elyas Bouzaiene	0	3	1	0	4
5	19	FW	(Tunisia)	Achref Jabri	2	1	0	1	4
9	‡	FW	(The Gambia)	Kebba Sowe	0	0	2	0	2
9	‡	FW	(Tunisia)	Youssef Abdelli	2	0	0	0	2
9	10	MF	(Brazil)	Yan Sasse	2	0	0	0	2
9	21	MF	(Ivory Coast)	Abdramane Konaté	0	0	2	0	2
9	14	MF	(Nigeria)	Onuche Ogbelu	2	0	0	0	2
9	13	DF	(Tunisia)	Raed Bouchniba	2	0	0	0	2
9	39	FW	(Tunisia)	Rayen Hamrouni	0	2	0	0	2
9	38	MF	(Tunisia)	Khalil Guenichi	2	0	0	0	2
17	23	MF	(Tunisia)	Larry Azouni	1	0	0	0	1
17	6	DF	(Tunisia)	Hamza Jelassi	1	0	0	0	1
17	30	FW	(Tunisia)	Koussay Maacha	0	1	0	0	1
17	12	MF	(Tunisia)	Haytham Dhaou	1	0	0	0	1
17	4	MF	(Tunisia)	Wael Derbali	0	1	0	0	1
Total					37	13	17	2	69

=== Cleansheets ===
Rank	No.	Nat	Player	Ligue 1	Tunisian Cup	CAF Champions League	Other^{1}	Total
1	1	(Tunisia)	Amenallah Memmiche	10	2	3	1	16
2	32	(Tunisia)	Bechir Ben Saïd	4	2	3	1	10
3	26	(Tunisia)	Mohamed Sedki Debchi	0.5	0	0	0	0.5
3	16	(Tunisia)	Mokhtar Ifaoui	0.5	0	0	0	0.5
Total				15	4	6	2	27

=== Disciplinary record ===
N	P	Nat.	Name	Ligue 1			Tunisian Cup			CAF Champions League			Other^{1}			Total			Notes
N	P	Nat.	Name	Yellow card	Second yellow card	Red card	Yellow card	Second yellow card	Red card	Yellow card	Second yellow card	Red card	Yellow card	Second yellow card	Red card	Yellow card	Second yellow card	Red card	Notes
38	MF	(Tunisia)	Khalil Guenichi	2		1	1						1			4		1	
3	DF	(Tunisia)	Koussay Smiri	1		1										1		1	
11	FW	(Algeria)	Youcef Belaïli	10						2			2			14			
14	MF	(Nigeria)	Onuche Ogbelu	4			2			1			1			8			
6	DF	(Tunisia)	Hamza Jelassi	4			1			1						6			
1	GK	(Tunisia)	Amenallah Memmiche	3						2						5			
20	DF	(Tunisia)	Mohamed Amine Ben Hamida	3			1			1						5			
10	MF	(Brazil)	Yan Sasse	4									1			5			
2	DF	(Tunisia)	Mohamed Ben Ali	2						1			2			5			
15	DF	(Algeria)	Mohamed Amine Tougai	3									1			4			
13	DF	(Tunisia)	Raed Bouchniba	3												3			
18	MF	(Togo)	Roger Aholou	2						1						3			
40	FW	(Mali)	Aboubacar Diakité	3												3			
24	FW	(South Africa)	Elias Mokwana	1						2						3			
23	MF	(Tunisia)	Larry Azouni	1						1						2			
8	MF	(Tunisia)	Houssem Tka	1						1						2			
28	FW	(Tunisia)	Zinedine Kada	2												2			
25	DF	(Sweden)	Elyas Bouzaiene	1			1									2			
36	MF	(Tunisia)	Chiheb Jebali	1			1									2			
4	MF	(Tunisia)	Wael Derbali	1									1			2			
5	DF	(Tunisia)	Yassine Meriah	1												1			
‡	FW	(Tunisia)	Oussama Bouguerra	1												1			
22	DF	(Tunisia)	Ayman Ben Mohamed							1						1			
30	FW	(Tunisia)	Koussay Maacha	1												1			
19	FW	(Tunisia)	Achref Jabri							1						1			
21	MF	(Ivory Coast)	Abdramane Konaté	1												1			
9	FW	(Brazil)	Rodrigo Rodrigues				1									1			

Source: Competitions
Ordered by (red card) , (second yellow card) and (yellow card)
(yellow card) = Number of bookings; (second yellow card) = Number of sending offs after a second yellow card; (red card) = Number of sending offs by a direct red card.

== Milestones ==
=== Debuts ===
The following players made their competitive debuts for the first team during the campaign.

Legend

– Indicates youth academy debut.

Date	No.	Pos.	Nat.	Player	Age	Final score	Opponent	Competition
31 August 2024	7	FW	(Tunisia)	Youssef Abdelli (Note: Abdelli played previously for Espérance de Tunis in 2020.)	25	3–0 (H)	US Tataouine	Tunisian Ligue Professionnelle 1
31 August 2024	11	FW	(Algeria)	Youcef Belaïli (Note: Belaïli played previously for Espérance de Tunis twice from 2012 to 2014 and from 2018 to 2019, scoring 21 goals.)	32	3–0 (H)	US Tataouine	Tunisian Ligue Professionnelle 1
31 August 2024	22	DF	(Tunisia)	Ayman Ben Mohamed (Note: Ben Mohamed played previously for Espérance de Tunis from 2016 to 2019.)	29	3–0 (H)	US Tataouine	Tunisian Ligue Professionnelle 1
31 August 2024	23	MF	(Tunisia)	Larry Azouni	30	3–0 (H)	US Tataouine	Tunisian Ligue Professionnelle 1
31 August 2024	21	MF	(Ivory Coast)	Abdramane Konaté	18	3–0 (H)	US Tataouine	Tunisian Ligue Professionnelle 1
31 August 2024	24	FW	(South Africa)	Elias Mokwana	25	3–0 (H)	US Tataouine	Tunisian Ligue Professionnelle 1
21 September 2024	32	GK	(Tunisia)	Bechir Ben Saïd	31	8–0 (H)	(Somalia) Dekedaha	CAF Champions League
21 September 2024	6	DF	(Tunisia)	Hamza Jelassi	32	8–0 (H)	(Somalia) Dekedaha	CAF Champions League
9 November 2024	30	FW	(Tunisia)	Koussay Maacha	17	2–1 (H)	AS Gabès	Tunisian Ligue Professionnelle 1
25 December 2024	35	DF	(Tunisia)	Aziz Koudhai	20	0–3 (A)	EGS Gafsa	Tunisian Ligue Professionnelle 1
12 January 2025	25	DF	(Sweden)	Elyas Bouzaiene	27	0–1 (A)	(Mali) Djoliba	CAF Champions League
29 January 2025	16	GK	(Tunisia)	Mokhtar Ifaoui	21	0–2 (A)	US Tataouine	Tunisian Ligue Professionnelle 1
29 January 2025	37	MF	(Belgium)	Mohamed Mouhli	26	0–2 (A)	US Tataouine	Tunisian Ligue Professionnelle 1
2 February 2025	40	FW	(Mali)	Aboubacar Diakité	18	4–2 (H)	AS Soliman	Tunisian Ligue Professionnelle 1
8 February 2025	36	MF	(Tunisia)	Chiheb Jebali	28	0–1 (A)	Stade Tunisien	Tunisian Ligue Professionnelle 1
16 April 2025	31	MF	(Tunisia)	Wajdi Issaoui	20	6–0 (H)	AS Kasserine	Tunisian Cup
26 April 2025	12	MF	(Tunisia)	Haytham Dhaou	20	0–4 (A)	CS Hammam-Lif	Tunisian Cup

(H) – Home; (A) – Away

=== First goals ===
The following players scored their first goals for Espérance de Tunis first team during the campaign.

Date	No.	Pos.	Nat.	Player	Age	Score	Final score	Opponent	Competition
31 August 2024	11	FW	(Algeria)	Youcef Belaïli	32	2–0 (H)	3–0 (H)	US Tataouine	Tunisian Ligue Professionnelle 1
21 September 2024	6	DF	(Tunisia)	Hamza Jelassi	32	8–0 (H)	8–0 (H)	(Somalia) Dekedaha	CAF Champions League
25 September 2024	21	MF	(Ivory Coast)	Abdramane Konaté	18	1–2 (A)	1–2 (A)	AS Soliman	Tunisian Ligue Professionnelle 1
29 September 2024	28	FW	(Tunisia)	Zinedine Kada	19	2–2 (H)	2–2 (H)	Stade Tunisien	Tunisian Ligue Professionnelle 1
3 November 2024	24	FW	(South Africa)	Elias Mokwana	25	0–2 (A)	0–2 (A)	Étoile du Sahel	Tunisian Ligue Professionnelle 1
9 November 2024	30	FW	(Tunisia)	Koussay Maacha	17	2–1 (H)	2–1 (H)	AS Gabès	Tunisian Ligue Professionnelle 1
18 January 2025	19	FW	(Tunisia)	Achref Jabri	23	1–0 (H)	4–1 (H)	(Angola) Sagrada Esperança	CAF Champions League
2 February 2025	8	MF	(Tunisia)	Houssem Tka	24	1–0 (H)	4–2 (H)	AS Soliman	Tunisian Ligue Professionnelle 1
19 February 2025	14	MF	(Nigeria)	Onuche Ogbelu	21	3–2 (H)	4–2 (H)	Espérance de Zarzis	Tunisian Ligue Professionnelle 1
22 February 2025	36	MF	(Tunisia)	Chiheb Jebali	28	1–1 (A)	2–1 (A)	CA Bizertin	Tunisian Ligue Professionnelle 1
16 April 2025	23	MF	(Tunisia)	Larry Azouni	31	1–0 (H)	6–0 (H)	AS Kasserine	Tunisian Cup
16 April 2025	31	MF	(Tunisia)	Wajdi Issaoui	20	5–0 (H)	6–0 (H)	AS Kasserine	Tunisian Cup
26 April 2025	37	MF	(Belgium)	Mohamed Mouhli	26	0–2 (A)	0–4 (A)	CS Hammam-Lif	Tunisian Cup
26 April 2025	35	DF	(Tunisia)	Aziz Koudhai	20	0–4 (A)	0–4 (A)	CS Hammam-Lif	Tunisian Cup

(H) – Home; (A) – Away
