= 2024–25 Tunisian Cup =

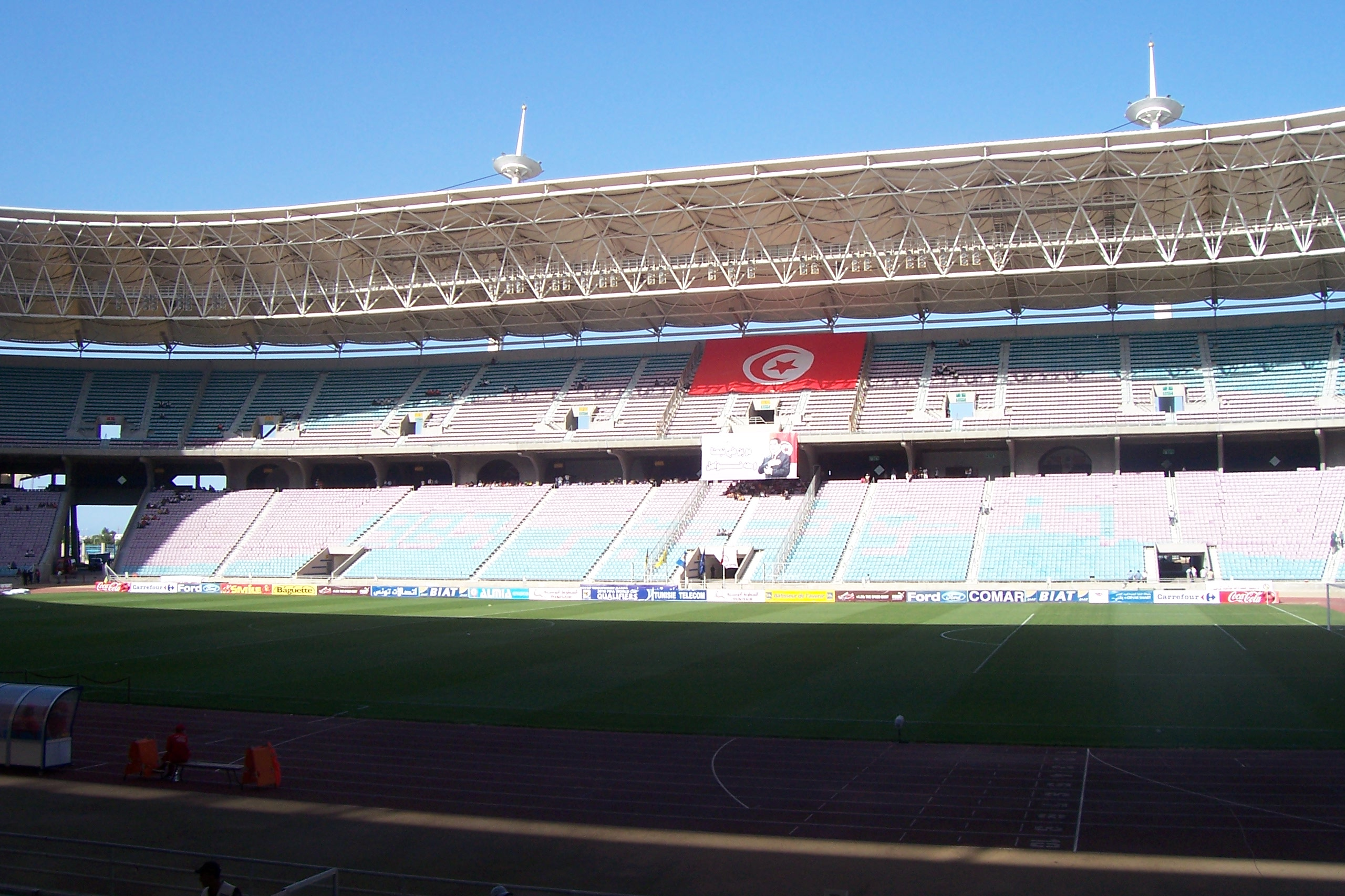
- Hammadi Agrebi Stadium hosted the final

Tournament details
- Country: Tunisia
- Dates: 3 April – 1 June 2025

Final positions
- Champions: Espérance de Tunis (16th title)
- Runners-up: Stade Tunisien

Tournament statistics
- Matches played: 31
- Goals scored: 71 (2.29 per match)
- Top goal scorer(s): Omar Ben Ali; Fayed Ben Hassine; Youssef Snana (4 goals each)
- (Note: All statistics start from the round of 32)

2024–25 Tunisian Cup was the 93rd season of the football cup competition of Tunisia. The competition was organized by the Tunisian Football Federation and open to all clubs in Tunisia.

== Schedule ==
Schedule for 2024–25 Tunisian Cup
Round	Draw date	Dates
Round of 32	23 March 2025	3, 5–8 & 16 April 2025
Round of 16	9 April 2025	26–27 & 30 April 2025
Quarter-finals	27 April 2025	17–18 May 2025
Semi-finals	18 May 2025	24–25 May 2025
Final	18 May 2025	1 June 2025

== Bracket ==
Round of 32
5 April — Ben Guerdane
US Ben Guerdane (1) (p)	0 (5)
CA Bizertin (1)	0 (4)
6 April — Zriba
US Zriba (4)	0
CS Sfaxien (1)	5
5 April — Gafsa
EGS Gafsa (1)	2
ES Hammam Sousse (2)	1
6 April — Moularès
GS Om Laarayes (4)	1
AS Soliman (1)	2
8 April — Bembla
CS Bembla (4)	2
CS Hammam-Lif (2)	4
16 April — Tunis (Radès)
Espérance de Tunis (1)	6
AS Kasserine (2)	0
5 April — Jendouba
Jendouba Sport (2)	0
AS Gabès (1)	1
6 April — Métlaoui
ES Métlaoui (1)	0
Espérance de Zarzis (1)	2
7 April — Monastir
US Monastir (1)	2
JS El Omrane (1)	1
6 April — Jilma
AS Jilma (2)	1
PS Sakiet Eddaïer (2)	0
6 April — Tataouine
US Tataouine (1)	0
Club Africain (1)	1
5 April — Menzel Bourguiba
Olympique Béja (1)	0
CS M'saken (2)	1
5 April — Kairouan
JS Kairouan (2) (a.e.t.)	1
Sfax RS (2)	0
6 April — Tunis (Mornag)
SS Mornag (4)	0
Étoile du Sahel (1)	1
3 April — Khniss
CS Khniss (4)	0
CS Manouba (3) (a.e.t.)	1
6 April — Tunis (Bardo)
Stade Tunisien (1)	1
Olympique Sidi Bouzid (2)	0

Round of 16
27 April — Ben Guerdane
US Ben Guerdane (1)	1
CS Sfaxien (1)	0
27 April — Gafsa
EGS Gafsa (1)	1
AS Soliman (1)	0
26 April — Tunis (Hammam-Lif)
CS Hammam-Lif (2)	0
Espérance de Tunis (1)	4
26 April — Gabès
AS Gabès (1)	0
Espérance de Zarzis (1)	2
26 April — Monastir
US Monastir (1)	5
AS Jilma (2)	0
27 April — Tunis (Radès)
Club Africain (1) (a.e.t.)	2
CS M'saken (2)	1
30 April — Kairouan
JS Kairouan (2)	0
Étoile du Sahel (1)	1
27 April — Tunis (Manouba)
CS Manouba (3)	0
Stade Tunisien (1)	2

Quarter-finals
17 May — Ben Guerdane
US Ben Guerdane (1) (p)	2 (8)
EGS Gafsa (1)	2 (7)
18 May — Tunis (Radès)
Espérance de Tunis (1)	3
Espérance de Zarzis (1)	1
18 May — Monastir
US Monastir (1)	3
Club Africain (1)	0
18 May — Sousse
Étoile du Sahel (1)	0
Stade Tunisien (1)	1

Semi-finals
25 May — Ben Guerdane
US Ben Guerdane (1)	0
Espérance de Tunis (1)	3
24 May — Monastir
US Monastir (1)	0 (3)
Stade Tunisien (1)	0 (4)

Final
1 June — Tunis (Radès)
Espérance de Tunis (1)	1
Stade Tunisien (1)	0

== Round of 32 ==
The draw for the round of 32 was held on 23 March 2025.

3 April 2025	CS Khniss (4)	0–1 (a.e.t.)	CS Manouba (3)	Khniss
14:00		Report	Khemissi 118'	Stadium: Khniss Municipal Stadium; Referee: Taher Tliche

5 April 2025	US Ben Guerdane (1)	0–0 (a.e.t.) (5–4 p)	CA Bizertin (1)	Ben Guerdane
14:00		Report		Stadium: 7 March Stadium; Referee: Mahmoud Ksiaa
	Penalties
	Abderrazzak (penalty scored); Belwafi (penalty scored); Souissi (penalty scored); Hamed (penalty scored); Chaabane (penalty scored)		(penalty scored) Aloui; (penalty missed) Ah. Amri; (penalty scored) Allela; (penalty scored) Kanté; (penalty scored) Rehimi

5 April 2025	Olympique Béja (1)	0–1	CS M'saken (2)	Menzel Bourguiba
14:00		Report	Boukadida 72'	Stadium: Azaiez Jaballah Stadium; Referee: Walid Hedhli

5 April 2025	EGS Gafsa (1)	2–1	ES Hammam Sousse (2)	Gafsa
14:00	Ben Hassine 3', 59'	Report	Mani 26'	Stadium: Mohamed Rouached Stadium; Referee: Nizar Riahi

5 April 2025	Jendouba Sport (2)	0–1	AS Gabès (1)	Jendouba
14:00		Report	Ben Amor 22'	Stadium: Jendouba Municipal Stadium; Referee: Wael Mosbahi

5 April 2025	JS Kairouan (2)	1–0 (a.e.t.)	Sfax RS (2)	Kairouan
14:00	Fatnassi 103'	Report		Stadium: Hamda Laouani Stadium; Referee: Yassine Merghni

6 April 2025	US Zriba (4)	0–5	CS Sfaxien (1)	Zriba
14:00		Report	Sekkouhi 34' (pen.); O. Ben Ali 36', 49', 50', 82'	Stadium: Zriba Hammem Municipal Stadium; Referee: Ridha Chouihi

6 April 2025	AS Jilma (2)	1–0	PS Sakiet Eddaïer (2)	Jilma
14:00	Gasmi 33'	Report		Stadium: Jilma Municipal Stadium; Referee: Montassar Ammar

6 April 2025	GS Om Laarayes (4)	1–2	AS Soliman (1)	Moularès
14:00	Saidi 85'	Report	Jebli 18'; Majhed 21'	Stadium: Moularès Municipal Stadium; Referee: Akrem Neili

6 April 2025	ES Métlaoui (1)	0–2	Espérance de Zarzis (1)	Métlaoui
14:00		Report	Snana 54', 67'	Stadium: Métlaoui Municipal Stadium

6 April 2025	Stade Tunisien (1)	1–0	Olympique Sidi Bouzid (2)	Tunis
14:00	Ayadi 42' (pen.)	Report		Stadium: Hédi Enneifer Stadium; Referee: Raed Jouirou

6 April 2025	US Tataouine (1)	0–1	Club Africain (1)	Tataouine
14:00		Report	Youssef 41'	Stadium: Nejib Khattab Stadium; Referee: Oussama Ben Ishak

6 April 2025	SS Mornag (4)	0–1	Étoile du Sahel (1)	Tunis
14:00		Report	Chaouat 57'	Stadium: Mornag Stadium; Attendance: 0 (close doors); Referee: Houssem Hadj Ali

7 April 2025	US Monastir (1)	2–1	JS El Omrane (1)	Monastir
13:00	Mastouri 20' (pen.); Ghorbel 39'	Report	Zouaghi 79'	Stadium: Mustapha Ben Jannet Stadium; Referee: Seif Ouertani

8 April 2025	CS Bembla (4)	2–4	CS Hammam-Lif (2)	Bembla
14:00	Chiba 61'; Brahem 78'	Report	Nacef 26', 56'; Moukhinini 51'; Kacem 66'	Stadium: Bembla Municipal Stadium; Referee: Houssem Dhahri

16 April 2025	Espérance de Tunis (1)	6–0	AS Kasserine (2)	Tunis
14:00	Azouni 28', 52'; Jabri 32', 42'; Issaoui 54'; Derbali 86'	Report		Stadium: Hammadi Agrebi Stadium; Referee: Majdi Bellagha

== Round of 16 ==
The draw for the round of 32 was held on 9 April 2025.

26 April 2025	AS Gabès (1)	0–2	Espérance de Zarzis (1)	Gabès
14:30		Report	Snana 67' (pen.); Douihech 90+4'	Stadium: Gabès Municipal Stadium; Referee: Hamza Jaied

26 April 2025	US Monastir (1)	5–0	AS Jilma (2)	Monastir
14:30	Abdelli 17'; Dridi 39'; Hadj Khalifa 45+2'; Chikhaoui 47'; Bouatay 89'	Report		Stadium: Mustapha Ben Jannet Stadium; Referee: Mohamed Aguel

26 April 2025	CS Hammam-Lif (2)	0–4	Espérance de Tunis (1)	Tunis
14:30		Report	Derbali 38'; Mouhli 43'; Maacha 49'; Koudhai 86'	Stadium: Bou Kornine Stadium; Referee: Seif Ouertani

27 April 2025	EGS Gafsa (1)	1–0	AS Soliman (1)	Gafsa
14:30	Ajmani 55' (pen.)	Report		Stadium: Mohamed Rouached Stadium; Referee: Amine Fgaier

27 April 2025	Club Africain (1)	2–1 (a.e.t.)	CS M'saken (2)	Tunis
14:30	Labidi 45+4'; Aït Malek 99'	Report	Slimane 60'	Stadium: Hammadi Agrebi Stadium; Referee: Houssem Ben Sassi

27 April 2025	US Ben Guerdane (1)	1–0	CS Sfaxien (1)	Ben Guerdane
14:30	Abderrazzak 80'	Report		Stadium: 7 March Stadium; Referee: Haythem Trabelsi

27 April 2025	CS Manouba (3)	0–2	Stade Tunisien (1)	Tunis
14:30		Report	Ayadi 31'; Saafi 40'	Stadium: Manouba Municipal Stadium; Referee: Sofiene Ouertani

30 April 2025	JS Kairouan (2)	0–1	Étoile du Sahel (1)	Kairouan
14:30		Report	Chaouat 78' (pen.)	Stadium: Hamda Laouani Stadium; Referee: Khalil Jary

== Quarter-finals ==
The draw for the quarter-finals was held on 27 April 2025. All the teams that qualified for the quarter-finals were from the 1st tier.

17 May 2025	US Ben Guerdane	2–2 (a.e.t.) (8–7 p)	EGS Gafsa	Ben Guerdane
14:30	Souissi 90+1'; Yaakoubi 109'	Report	Ben Hassine 31' (pen.), 104' (pen.)	Stadium: 7 March Stadium; Referee: Amir Loussif
	Penalties
	Taous (penalty scored); Souissi (penalty scored); Hamed (penalty missed); Yaakoubi (penalty scored); Abdi (penalty scored); Ben Ahmed (penalty scored); Bououni (penalty scored); Touis (penalty missed); Banga (penalty scored); Mbida (penalty missed); Farhati (penalty scored)		(penalty scored) Omrani; (penalty scored) Ben Hassine; (penalty missed) Barbati; (penalty scored) Ben Chaieb; (penalty scored) Has. Mbarek; (penalty scored) Chaabani; (penalty scored) Horchani; (penalty missed) Frioui; (penalty scored) Mejri; (penalty missed) Hay. Mbarek; (penalty missed) Bennour

18 May 2025	US Monastir	3–0	Club Africain	Monastir
14:30	Mastouri 9'; Ganouni 39'; Harzi 90+2'	Report		Stadium: Mustapha Ben Jannet Stadium; Referee: Nidhal Letaief

18 May 2025	Espérance de Tunis	3–1	Espérance de Zarzis	Tunis
14:30	Belaïli 6'; Sasse 42'; Jabri 43'	Report	Snana 74'	Stadium: Hammadi Agrebi Stadium; Referee: Walid Mansri

18 May 2025	Étoile du Sahel	0–1	Stade Tunisien	Sousse
17:00		Report	Kadida 88'	Stadium: Sousse Olympic Stadium; Referee: Haythem Trabelsi

== Semi-finals ==
The draw for the semi-finals was held on 18 May 2025.

24 May 2025
15:30

US Monastir	0–0 (a.e.t.)	Stade Tunisien
	Report
Penalties
Harzi (penalty missed); Mastouri (penalty missed); Ghorbel (penalty scored); Dridi (penalty scored)	2–4	(penalty scored) Mugisha; (penalty missed) Sahraoui; (penalty scored) Atoui; (penalty scored) Smaali; (penalty scored) Ayari

Mustapha Ben Jannet Stadium, Monastir
Referee: Houssem Boularesse

Stade Tunisien qualified for the final.

25 May 2025
15:30

US Ben Guerdane	0–3	Espérance de Tunis
	Report	Belaïli 11'; Sasse 68'; Rodrigues 90+2'

7 March Stadium, Ben Guerdane
Referee: Fredj Abdellaoui

Espérance de Tunis qualified for the final.

== Final ==
The final was played on 1 June 2025 at Hammadi Agrebi Stadium, Tunis.

1 June 2025
16:00

Espérance de Tunis	1–0	Stade Tunisien
Ogbelu 64'	Report

Hammadi Agrebi Stadium, Tunis
Attendance: 30,000
Referee: Oussama Ben Ishak

== See also ==
- 2024–25 Tunisian Ligue Professionnelle 1
- 2024–25 Tunisian Ligue Professionnelle 2
- 2024–25 Tunisian Super Cup
