= 2023–24 Tunisian Super Cup =

19th edition of the Tunisian Super Cup

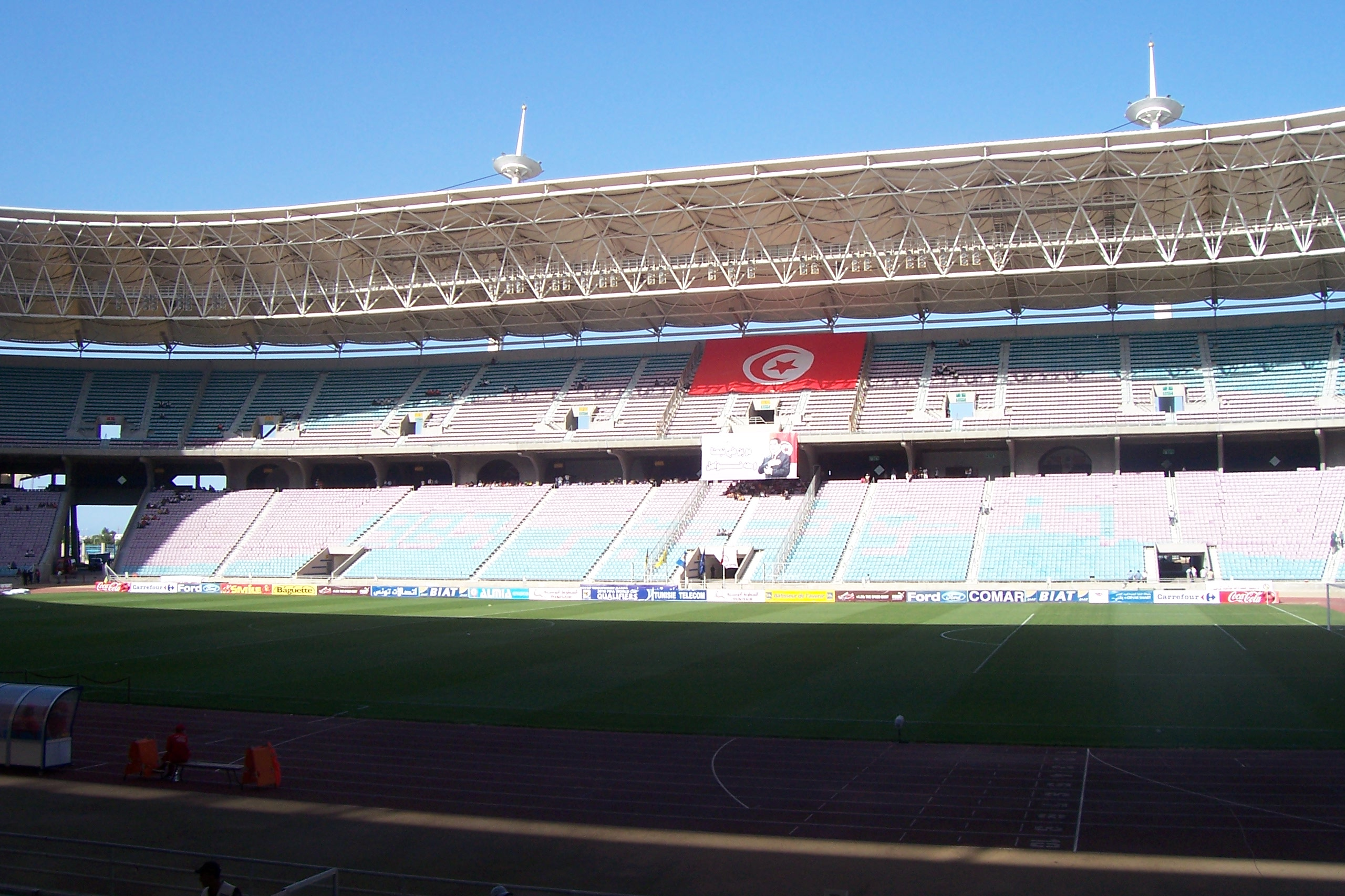
- Hammadi Agrebi Stadium hosted the match
Espérance de Tunis	Stade Tunisien
Ligue 1	Tunisian Cup
2	0
- Date: 16 February 2025
- Venue: Hammadi Agrebi Stadium, Tunis
- Referee: Mahmoud Nagy (Egypt)
- Attendance: 30,000
- Weather: Sunny overall 17 °C (63 °F); 54% humidity

The 2023–24 Tunisian Super Cup was the 19th edition of the Tunisian Super Cup. The match was contested by the 2023–24 Tunisian Ligue Professionnelle 1 champions, Espérance de Tunis, and the 2023–24 Tunisian Cup winners, Stade Tunisien. The match took place at Hammadi Agrebi Stadium in Tunis on 16 February 2025.

== Venue ==
Hammadi Agrebi Stadium, formerly known as 7 November Stadium is a multi-purpose stadium in Radès, Tunis, Tunisia about 10 kilometers south-east of the city center of Tunis, in the center of the Olympic City. It is currently used mostly for football matches and it also has facilities for athletics. The stadium holds 60,000 and was built in 2001 for the 2001 Mediterranean Games and is considered to be one of the best stadiums in Africa.

== Match ==
16 February 2025
15:00

Espérance de Tunis	2–0	Stade Tunisien
Mokwana 59'; Belaïli 84'	Report

Hammadi Agrebi Stadium, Tunis
Attendance: 30,000
Referee: Mahmoud Nagy (Egypt)

Espérance de Tunis	Stade Tunisien

GK	1	(Tunisia) Amenallah Memmiche
DF	2	(Tunisia) Mohamed Ben Ali	(substituted off) 68'
DF	6	(Tunisia) Hamza Jelassi
MF	8	(Tunisia) Houssem Tka	(substituted off) 87'
FW	11	(Algeria) Youcef Belaïli
DF	15	(Algeria) Mohamed Amine Tougai
FW	19	(Tunisia) Achref Jabri	(substituted off) 71'
DF	20	(Tunisia) Mohamed Amine Ben Hamida (c)
MF	21	(Ivory Coast) Abdramane Konaté	(substituted off) 70'
FW	24	(South Africa) Elias Mokwana
MF	27	(Tunisia) Khalil Guenichi	(substituted off) 88'
Substitutes:
DF	3	(Tunisia) Koussay Smiri	(substituted on) 71'
MF	10	(Brazil) Yan Sasse	(substituted on) 70'
MF	14	(Nigeria) Onuche Ogbelu
DF	22	(Tunisia) Ayman Ben Mohamed
MF	23	(Tunisia) Larry Azouni	(substituted on) 88'
DF	25	(Sweden) Elyas Bouzaiene	(substituted on) 68'
GK	26	(Tunisia) Mohamed Sedki Debchi
FW	30	(Tunisia) Koussay Maacha
MF	31	(Tunisia) Chiheb Jebali	(substituted on) 87'
Manager:
(Romania) Laurențiu Reghecampf

DF	5	(Tunisia) Adem Arous
FW	11	(Tunisia) Bilel Mejri	(substituted off) 63'
DF	13	(Tunisia) Nidhal Laifi
DF	15	(Ivory Coast) Ousmane Ouattara
GK	16	(Tunisia) Atef Dkhili (c)
FW	20	(Tunisia) Rayan Smaali	(substituted off) 80'
MF	21	(Ivory Coast) Yusuf Touré
FW	22	(Tunisia) Youssef Saafi
MF	25	(Rwanda) Bonheur Mugisha	(substituted off) 64'
DF	27	(Tunisia) Hedi Khalfa	(substituted off) 75'
FW	29	(Tunisia) Nacef Atoui	(substituted off) 64'
Substitutes:
GK	1	(Tunisia) Mehdi Ben Mrad
DF	2	(Senegal) Ibrahima Djite
MF	4	(Senegal) Amath Ndaw	(substituted on) 64'
DF	7	(Tunisia) Wael Ouerghemmi	(substituted on) 75'
FW	10	(Tunisia) Sajed Ferchichi	(substituted on) 80'
FW	14	(Tunisia) Sadok Kadida	(substituted on) 64'
DF	26	(Tunisia) Mohamed Iyadh Riahi
FW	30	(Tunisia) Khalil Ayari	(substituted on) 63'
DF	31	(Togo) Klousseh Agbozo
Manager:
(Tunisia) Maher Kanzari

Assistant referees:
Mahmoud Abourrijel (Egypt)
Ahmed Tawfik Teleb (Egypt)
Fourth official:
Haythem Kossai
Video assistant referee:
Mahmoud Ashour (Egypt)
Assistant video assistant referees:
Faycel Bannani

Match rules
- 90 minutes.
- Penalty shoot-out if score was level.
- Nine named substitutes, of which up to five may be used.

== See also ==
- 2023–24 Tunisian Ligue Professionnelle 1
- 2023–24 Tunisian Cup
