= Mohamed Mouhli =

Belgian footballer (born 1998)

Personal information
- Full name: Mohamed Mouhli
- Date of birth: 13 September 1998 (age 28)
- Place of birth: Belgium
- Height: 1.80 m (5 ft 11 in)
- Position: Attacking midfielder

Team information
- Current team: Olympic Charleroi
- Number: 11

Youth career
- FC Horion
- RFC Liège
- Visé
- Seraing

Senior career*
Years	Team	Apps	(Gls)
2016–2021	Seraing	40	(5)
2021–2025	RFC Liège	105	(15)
2025–2026	Espérance de Tunis	5	(0)
2026–	Olympic Charleroi	0	(0)
- * Club domestic league appearances and goals as of 13 April 2025

Mohamed Mouhli (Arabic: محمد الموحلي; born 13 September 1998) is a Belgian professional footballer who plays as an attacking midfielder for Belgian Division 1 club Olympic Charleroi.

== Club career ==
Mouhli began his career with RFC Liège in Belgium, where he played as an attacking midfielder. During the first half of the 2024–2025 season, he scored four goals for RFC Liège, contributing to the team performance in the Belgian second division.

In January 2025, Mouhli transferred to Espérance de Tunis. The agreement between RFC Liège and Espérance de Tunis was announced on 17 January 2025, pending administrative formalities. Mouhli arrived in Tunisia on January 19, 2025, to finalize the transfer, including medical examinations and administrative procedures. On 28 January 2025, Espérance Sportive de Tunis officially announced Mouhli signing on a two-and-a-half-year contract. He became eligible to play starting from the match against US Tataouine on 29 January 2025.

== Playing style ==
Mouhli is known for his offensive capabilities and versatility in the attacking midfield position. His contributions at RFC Liège highlighted his goal-scoring ability and playmaking skills.

== Career statistics ==
As of 26 April 2025

Appearances and goals by club, season and competition
Club	Season	League			Cup (Note: Includes Belgian Cup and Tunisian Cup)		Continental		Other		Total	
Club	Season	Division	Apps	Goals	Apps	Goals	Apps	Goals	Apps	Goals	Apps	Goals
Seraing	2015–16	Belgian Second Division	1	0	0	0	—		—		1	0
Seraing	2016–17	Belgian First Amateur Division	2	0	0	0	—		—		2	0
Seraing	2017–18	Belgian First Amateur Division	7	1	0	0	—		—		7	1
Seraing	2018–19	Belgian First Amateur Division	12	1	0	0	—		—		12	1
Seraing	2019–20	Belgian First Amateur Division	13	2	1	0	—		—		14	2
Seraing	2020–21	Belgian First Division B	5	1	1	1	—		—		6	2
Seraing	Total		40	5	2	1	—		—		42	6
RFC Liège	2021–22	Belgian National Division 1	30	2	1	0	—		—		31	2
RFC Liège	2022–23	Belgian National Division 1	32	7	0	0	—		—		32	7
RFC Liège	2023–24	Challenger Pro League	27	2	0	0	—		—		27	2
RFC Liège	2024–25	Challenger Pro League	16	4	2	0	—		—		18	4
RFC Liège	Total		105	15	3	0	—		—		108	15
Espérance de Tunis	2024–25	Tunisian Ligue Professionnelle 1	5	0	2	1	0	0	0	0	7	1
Espérance de Tunis	2025–26	Tunisian Ligue Professionnelle 1	0	0	0	0	0	0	0	0	0	0
Espérance de Tunis	Total		5	0	2	1	0	0	0	0	7	1
Olympic Charleroi	2026–27	Belgian Division 1	0	0	0	0	—		—		0	0
Career total			150	20	7	2	0	0	0	0	157	22

== Honours ==
Espérance de Tunis

- Tunisian Super Cup: 2024, 2025
- Tunisian Ligue Professionnelle 1: 2024–25
- Tunisian Cup: 2024–25, 2025–26
