= Abdelli =

Abdelli is a Tunisian and Algerian surname. Notable people with the surname include:

- Abderrahmane Abdelli (born 1958), Algerian author, composer and singer-songwriter
- Himad Abdelli (born 1999), French-Algerian footballer
- Lassaad Abdelli (born 1960), Tunisian footballer
- Lotfi Abdelli (born 1970), Tunisian actor and comedian
- Rima Abdelli (born 1988), Tunisian Paralympic shot putter
- Youssef Abdelli (born 1998), Tunisian footballer

== See also ==
- Sidi Abdelli, town in Algeria
