= Lassaad =

Lassaad, Lassaâd or Lassâad is a Tunisian masculine given name. Notable people with the name include:

- Lassaad Abdelli (born 1960), Tunisian footballer
- Lassaad Chabbi (born 1961), Tunisian football manager
- Lassaad Dridi (born 1977), Tunisian footballer and manager
- Lassâad Hanini (born 1971), Tunisian footballer
- Lassaad Maamar (born 1968), Tunisian football manager
- Lassaâd Ouertani (1980–2013), Tunisian footballer
