= Mohamed Sedki Debchi =

Tunisian footballer

Personal information
- Full name: Mohamed Sedki Debchi
- Date of birth: 28 October 1999 (age 27)
- Place of birth: Gabès, Tunisia
- Height: 1.96 m (6 ft 5 in)
- Position: Goalkeeper

Team information
- Current team: Hidd
- Number: 31

Senior career*
| Years | Team | Apps | (Gls) |
| 2018–2019 | AS Gabès | 19 | (0) |
| 2019–2026 | Espérance de Tunis | 40 | (0) |
| 2026– | Hidd | 40 | (0) |
- * Club domestic league appearances and goals as of 29 January 2025

Mohamed Sedki Debchi (Arabic: محمد الصدقي الدبشي; born 28 October 1999) is a Tunisian professional footballer who plays as a goalkeeper for Bahraini Premier League club Hidd.

== Honours ==
Espérance de Tunis

- Tunisian Ligue Professionnelle 1: 2019–20, 2020–21, 2021–22, 2023–24, 2024–25
- Tunisian Super Cup: 2019, 2021, 2024, 2025
- Tunisian Cup: 2024–25, 2025–26

Tunisia

- Kirin Cup Soccer: 2022
