= Amenallah Memmiche =

Tunisian football player (born 2004)

Personal information
- Full name: Amenallah Memmiche
- Date of birth: 20 April 2004 (age 22)
- Place of birth: Tunis, Tunisia
- Height: 1.87 m (6 ft 2 in)
- Position: Goalkeeper

Team information
- Current team: Espérance de Tunis
- Number: 1

Senior career*
Years	Team	Apps	(Gls)
2023–	Espérance de Tunis	58	(0)

International career^{‡}
2023	Tunisia U20	1	(0)
2024–	Tunisia	5	(0)
- * Club domestic league appearances and goals as of 6 September 2026 ‡ National team caps and goals as of 14 November 2024

Amenallah Memmiche (Arabic: أمان الله مميش; born 20 April 2004) is a Tunisian professional footballer who plays as a goalkeeper for Tunisian Ligue Professionnelle 1 club Espérance de Tunis and the Tunisia national team.

== Club career ==
Memmiche began his career in the youth system of Espérance de Tunis. On 7 June 2023, he made his first appearance in the 2–0 home win against Olympique Béja.

== International career ==
He was called up by Montasser Louhichi to the Tunisia national team in June 2024 for the 2026 FIFA World Cup qualification and did not play. He was called up by Faouzi Benzarti for the 2025 Africa Cup of Nations qualification and played his first appearance in the 1–0 against Madagascar on 5 September 2024.

== Honours ==
Espérance de Tunis

- Tunisian Ligue Professionnelle 1: 2023–24, 2024–25
- Tunisian Super Cup: 2024, 2025
- Tunisian Cup: 2024–25, 2025–26
