= Larry Azouni =

Tunisian footballer (born 1994)

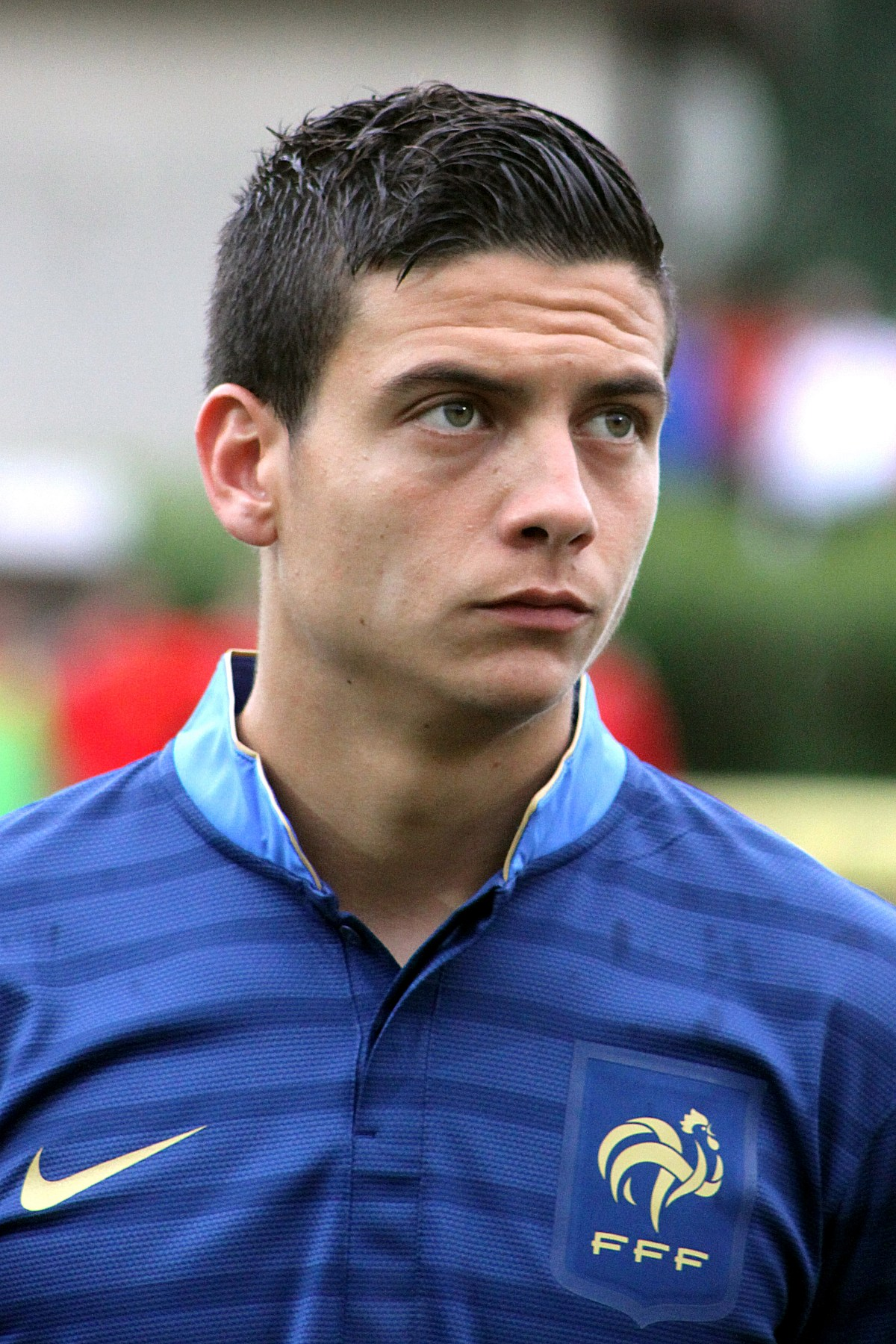
- Azouni with France U19 in 2013

Personal information
- Full name: Larry Francis Abdel Azouni
- Date of birth: 23 March 1994 (age 32)
- Place of birth: Marseille, France
- Height: 1.76 m (5 ft 9 in)
- Position: Midfielder

Team information
- Current team: Dibba Al-Hisn
- Number: 6

Youth career
- 2000–2006: Burel FC
- 2006–2012: Marseille

Senior career*
Years	Team	Apps	(Gls)
2012–2014	Marseille	0	(0)
2013–2014	→ Lorient (loan)	2	(0)
2014–2017	Nîmes	75	(4)
2017–2020	Kortrijk	64	(1)
2020–2021	Nacional	27	(0)
2021–2023	Club Africain	39	(2)
2023–2024	Al Faisaly	28	(1)
2024–2025	Espérance de Tunis	12	(0)
2025–	Dibba Al-Hisn	0	(0)

International career^{‡}
2012	France U18	3	(0)
2012–2013	France U19	14	(0)
2013	France U20	2	(1)
2014	Tunisia U23	1	(0)
2016–	Tunisia	10	(0)
Medal record
Men's Football
Representing France
UEFA European Under-19 Championship
Runner-up	2013 Lithuania	Team
- * Club domestic league appearances and goals as of 1 March 2025 ‡ National team caps and goals as of 26 March 2019

Larry Francis Abdel Azouni (born 23 March 1994) is a professional footballer who plays as a midfielder for UAE First Division League club Dibba Al-Hisn. Born in France, he opted to represent Tunisia internationally.

== Club career ==
Azouni made his professional debut on 6 December 2012 in the 2012–13 Europa League campaign against Cypriot side AEL Limassol in a 3–0 loss. He came on as a substitute for Kassim Abdallah in the 74th minute.

On 21 July 2023, Azouni joined Saudi First Division League club Al Faisaly.

== International career ==
Azouni was born and raised in France, to parents of Tunisian-Jewish descent. He played for various France youth teams, before switching to the Tunisia national football team. He made one appearance for the Tunisia U21 team. He made his debut for the senior Tunisia team in a 1–0 2017 Africa Cup of Nations qualification win over Togo as a sub in the 89th minute.

== Career statistics ==
=== Club ===
As of 26 April 2025

Appearances and goals by club, season and competition
Club	Season	League			Cup (Note: Includes Coupe de France, Belgian Cup, Taça de Portugal, Tunisian Cup, King's Cup and UAE President's Cup)		League cup (Note: Includes Coupe de la Ligue)		Continental		Other		Total	
Club	Season	Division	Apps	Goals	Apps	Goals	Apps	Goals	Apps	Goals	Apps	Goals	Apps	Goals
Marseille	2012–13	Ligue 1	0	0	0	0	0	0	1 (Note: Appearance in UEFA Europa League)	0	—		1	0
Lorient (loan)	2013–14	Ligue 1	2	0	1	0	1	0	—				4	0
Nîmes	2014–15	Ligue 2	11	0	2	0	1	0	—				14	0
Nîmes	2015–16	Ligue 2	33	2	1	0	1	0	—				35	2
Nîmes	2016–17	Ligue 2	31	2	0	0	1	0	—				32	2
Nîmes	Total		75	4	3	0	3	0	—				81	4
Kortrijk	2017–18	Belgian First Division A	18	1	5	1	—						23	2
Kortrijk	2018–19	Belgian First Division A	29	0	3	0	—						32	0
Kortrijk	2019–20	Belgian First Division A	17	0	4	0	—						21	0
Kortrijk	Total		64	1	12	1	—						76	2
Nacional	2020–21	Primeira Liga	0	0	0	0	—						0	0
Club Africain	2021–22	Tunisian Ligue Professionnelle 1	22	0	3	0	—						25	0
Club Africain	2022–23	Tunisian Ligue Professionnelle 1	17	2	2	0	—		4 (Note: All appearances in CAF Confederation Cup)	0	—		23	2
Club Africain	Total		39	2	5	0	—		4	0	—		48	2
Al Faisaly	2023–24	Saudi First Division League	28	1	2	0	—						30	1
Espérance de Tunis	2024–25	Tunisian Ligue Professionnelle 1	12	0	2	2	—		4 (Note: All appearances in CAF Champions League)	0	1 (Note: Appearance in Tunisian Super Cup)	0	19	2
Dibba Al Hisn	2025–26	UAE First Division League	0	0	0	0	—						0	0
Career total			220	8	25	3	4	0	9	0	1	0	259	11

=== International ===
As of 26 March 2019

Appearances and goals by national team and year
National team	Year	Apps	Goals
Tunisia	2016	3	0
Tunisia	2017	6	0
Tunisia	2019	1	0
Total		10	0

== Honours ==
Espérance de Tunis

- Tunisian Super Cup: 2024
- Tunisian Ligue Professionnelle 1: 2024–25
- Tunisian Cup: 2024–25
