= Houssem Eddine Souissi =

Tunisian footballer

Personal information
- Date of birth: 20 October 1997 (age 29)
- Place of birth: Tunisia
- Height: 1.82 m (6 ft 0 in)
- Position: Midfielder

Team information
- Current team: Hassania Agadir

Senior career*
Years	Team	Apps	(Gls)
2016–2019	Club Africain B		
2018	→ US Ben Guerdane (loan)	1	(0)
2020–2021	AS Rejiche	24	(1)
2021–	Qadsia SC	5	(1)
2022–	→ Hassania Agadir (loan)	0	(0)
- * Club domestic league appearances and goals

Houssem Eddine Souissi (born 20 October 1997) is a Tunisian football midfielder who currently plays for Hassania Agadir.
