= Ali Youssef (footballer, born 2001) =

Libyan footballer (born 2003)

Personal information
- Full name: Ali Youssef Ibrahim Almusrati
- Date of birth: 9 July 2001 (age 25)
- Place of birth: Benghazi, Libya
- Height: 1.88 m (6 ft 2 in)
- Position: Defender

Team information
- Current team: Al-Ittihad
- Number: 2

Senior career*
Years	Team	Apps	(Gls)
–2024	Al-Ahly SC		
2024–2025	Club Africain	38	(6)
2026	Nantes	13	(0)
2026–	Al-Ittihad	0	(0)

International career^{‡}
2022–	Libya	33	(1)
- * Club domestic league appearances and goals as of 10 September 2026 ‡ National team caps and goals as of 13 November 2026

Ali Youssef Ibrahim Almusrati (Arabic: علي يوسف; born 9 July 2001) is a Libyan professional footballer who plays as a defender for Al-Ittihad.

== Club career ==
Youssef started his career with Libyan side Al Ahli SC. Following his stint there, he signed for Tunisian side Club Africain ahead of the 2024–25 season, where he made thirty-eight league appearances and scored six goals. Arabic news website Erem News wrote in 2026 that "he attracted attention with his outstanding performance" while playing for the club. Eighteen months later, he signed for French Ligue 1 side FC Nantes.

== International career ==
Youssef is a Libya international. During the autumn of 2025, he played for the Libya national football team for 2025 FIFA Arab Cup qualification.

== Career statistics ==
=== Club ===
As of match played 2 May 2026

Appearances and goals by club, season and competition
Club	Season	League			National cup		Continental		Total	
Club	Season	Division	Apps	Goals	Apps	Goals	Apps	Goals	Apps	Goals
Al Ahly	2023–24	Libyan Premier League	—		—		4 (Note: Appearances in CAF Champions League)	0	4	0
Club Africain	2024–25	Tunisian Ligue 1	25	0	2	1	—		27	1
Club Africain	2025–26	Tunisian Ligue 1	13	2	0	0	—		13	2
Club Africain	Total		38	2	2	1	4	0	44	3
Nantes	2025–26	Ligue 1	12	0	—		—		12	0
Career total			50	2	2	1	4	0	56	3

=== International ===
As of match played 13 November 2026

Appearances and goals by national team and year
National team	Year	Apps	Goals
Libya	2022	2	0
Libya	2023	8	0
Libya	2024	12	0
Libya	2025	6	0
Libya	2026	5	1
Total		33	1

Scores and results list Libya's goal tally first.

No	Date	Venue	Opponent	Score	Result	Competition
1.	13 November 2026	Taieb Mhiri Stadium, Sfax, Tunisia	Tunisia	1–0	2–0	2027 Africa Cup of Nations qualification
