= Youssef Abdelli =

Tunisian footballer (born 1998)

Personal information
- Date of birth: 9 September 1998 (age 28)
- Place of birth: Tunis, Tunisia
- Height: 1.83 m (6 ft 0 in)
- Position: Forward

Team information
- Current team: US Monastir
- Number: 9

Youth career
- 2004–2011: Espérance de Tunis
- 2011–2018: Nice
- 2018–2020: Lens

Senior career*
Years	Team	Apps	(Gls)
2016–2017	Nice B	22	(2)
2018–2019	Lens B	10	(1)
2020	Espérance de Tunis	3	(0)
2020–2022	US Monastir	25	(5)
2022–2023	Al Ahli Saudi	6	(0)
2023–2024	Étoile du Sahel	21	(5)
2024–2025	Espérance de Tunis	6	(0)
2025–	US Monastir	21	(3)
- * Club domestic league appearances and goals as of 22 July 2026

Youssef Abdelli (Arabic: يُوسُف الْعَبْدَلِيّ; born 9 September 1998) is a professional footballer who currently plays as a forward for Tunisian Ligue Professionnelle 1 club US Monastir. He is the son of former footballer Lassaad Abdelli.

== Career statistics ==
As of 22 December 2024

Club	Season	League			Cup		Continental		Other		Total	
Club	Season	Division	Apps	Goals	Apps	Goals	Apps	Goals	Apps	Goals	Apps	Goals
Nice B	2016–17	Championnat National 2	16	1	—		—		—		16	1
Nice B	2017–18	Championnat National 2	6	1	—		—		—		6	1
Nice B	Total		22	2	—		—		—		22	2
Lens B	2018–19	Championnat National 2	10	1	—		—		—		10	1
Espérance de Tunis	2019–20	Tunisian Ligue Professionnelle 1	3	0	0	0	1 (Note: Appearance(s) in the CAF Champions League)	0	0	0	4	0
US Monastir	2020–21	Tunisian Ligue Professionnelle 1	5	0	4	3	2 (Note: Appearances in the CAF Confederation Cup)	0	—		11	3
US Monastir	2021–22	Tunisian Ligue Professionnelle 1	20	5	0	0	—		1 (Note: Appearance in the Tunisian Super Cup)	0	21	5
US Monastir	Total		25	5	4	3	2	0	1	0	32	8
Al Ahli Saudi	2022–23	Saudi First Division League	6	0	—		—		—		6	0
Étoile du Sahel	2022–23	Tunisian Ligue Professionnelle 1	12	3	1	0	—		—		13	3
Étoile du Sahel	2023–24	Tunisian Ligue Professionnelle 1	9	2	—		7	1	1	0	17	3
Étoile du Sahel	Total		21	5	1	0	7	1	1	0	30	6
Espérance de Tunis	2024–25	Tunisian Ligue Professionnelle 1	6	0	—		1	0	—		7	0
US Monastir	2024–25	Tunisian Ligue Professionnelle 1	0	0	0	0	—		—		0	0
Career total			93	13	5	3	11	1	2	0	111	17
