= Skander Kasri =

Tunisian football manager (born 1958)

Personal information
- Date of birth: August 29, 1958 (age 68)

Managerial career
- Years: Team
- 2013–2014: Espérance de Tunis (assistant)
- 2013: Espérance de Tunis (caretaker)
- 2014–2015: Espérance de Zarzis
- 2015–2016: Espérance de Tunis (assistant)
- 2016–2017: AS Gabès
- 2017–2018: US Monastir
- 2018: AS Gabès
- 2018–2019: US Tataouine
- 2019: Al-Adalah
- 2019–2020: CA Bizertin
- 2020–2021: US Tataouine
- 2021: Al-Bukiryah
- 2022–2023: Stade Tunisien
- 2023: CS Chebba
- 2023–2024: Al Sadaqa
- 2024: EGS Gafsa
- 2024: Espérance de Tunis (caretaker)
- 2024: Espérance de Tunis (assistant)
- 2024–2025: EGS Gafsa
- 2025: Olympique Béja

Skander Kasri (born 29 August 1958) is a Tunisian football manager..

== Career ==
Kasri became the head coach of ES Zarzis in July 2014.

Kasri served as the interim manager of ES Tunis during October - November 2024 and became assistant manager afterwards.
