= Hedi Khalfa =

Tunisian footballer

Personal information
- Date of birth: 16 January 1994 (age 32)
- Position: Defender

Team information
- Current team: Stade Tunisien

Senior career*
Years	Team	Apps	(Gls)
2014–2015	AS Gabès		
2015–2016	Olympique Béja		
2016–2020	US Tataouine		
2020–2021	US Monastir	6	(0)
2020–2022	AS Soliman	20	(1)
2023–	Stade Tunisien	36	(1)
- * Club domestic league appearances and goals as of 1 July 2025

Hedi Khalfa (born 16 January 1994) is a Tunisian professional footballer who plays as a defender for Stade Tunisien.
