= Iyed Belwafi =

Tunisian footballer (born 2003)

- Belwafi 2025

Personal information
- Date of birth: 23 May 2003 (age 23)
- Place of birth: Mezzouna, Tunisia
- Height: 1.79 m (5 ft 10 in)
- Positions: Forward; right winger

Team information
- Current team: CS Sfaxien
- Number: 11

Youth career
- 2016-2020: CS Sfaxien

Senior career*
Years	Team	Apps	(Gls)
2021-2024	CS Sfaxien	29	(7)
2024-2025	→ US Ben Guerdane (loan)	33	(7)
2025-	CS Sfaxien	11	(0)
- * Club domestic league appearances and goals as of 13 September 2026

Iyed Belwafi (born 23 May 2003; Arabic: إياد بالوافي) is a Tunisian professional footballer who plays as a Forward and right winger for CS Sfaxien.

== Career ==
His football journey began in his hometown of Mezzouna, where he came under the guidance of Atef El Mehdaoui and Atef El Kadri. They played a pivotal role in discovering his talent, nurturing his potential, and laying the foundations of his football development.

In 2016, he joined the youth academy of Club Sportif Sfaxien, where he benefited from high-level coaching, professional guidance, and comprehensive support throughout his development. He continued to refine his skills, strengthen his abilities, and progress through the club’s various youth age groups, building a solid foundation for his career in football.

On 24 August 2021, he took a major step in his career by signing his first professional contract with Club Sportif Sfaxien, committing to a five year deal. It was the beginning of a new chapter a moment that marked his transition into professional football.,

Belwafi spent the 2024–2025 season on loan at US Ben Guerdane, gaining valuable first-team experience and further developing his game.,

Following his loan spell, he renewed his contract with Club Sportif Sfaxien, extending his stay with the club until 2028.
