= Koussay Maacha =

Tunisian footballer (born 2007)

Personal information
- Full name: Koussay Ben Maacha
- Date of birth: 21 May 2007 (age 19)
- Place of birth: Tunis, Tunisia
- Height: 1.77 m (5 ft 10 in)
- Position: Winger

Team information
- Current team: AS Marsa

Youth career
- Espérance de Tunis

Senior career*
Years	Team	Apps	(Gls)
2024–2026	Espérance de Tunis	14	(3)
2026–	AS Marsa	0	(0)

International career^{‡}
2024	Tunisia U17	2	(1)
2025–	Tunisia U20	3	(0)
- * Club domestic league appearances and goals as of 6 November 2025 ‡ National team caps and goals as of 7 May 2025

Koussay Ben Maacha (Arabic: قصي معشة; born 21 May 2007) is a Tunisian professional footballer who plays as a winger for Tunisian Ligue Professionnelle 1 club AS Marsa.

== Club career ==
As a youth player, Maacha joined the youth academy of Espérance Sportive de Tunis and was promoted to the club's senior team in 2024. On 9 November 2024, he debuted for them during a 2–1 home win over AS Gabès in the league.

== International career ==
Maacha is a Tunisia youth international and has played for the Tunisia national under-17 football team and the Tunisia national under-20 football team. During November 2023, he helped the Tunisia national under-20 football team win the 2023 UNAF U-20 Tournament.

== Style of play ==
Maacha plays as a winger and is left-footed. Arabic news website winwin wrote in 2025 that he "has tremendous technical abilities that help him overcome players from opposing teams. He is also distinguished by his accurate passes and ability to win two-way balls".
