= Bou Kornine Stadium =

Coordinates: 36°43′38″N 10°20′46″E

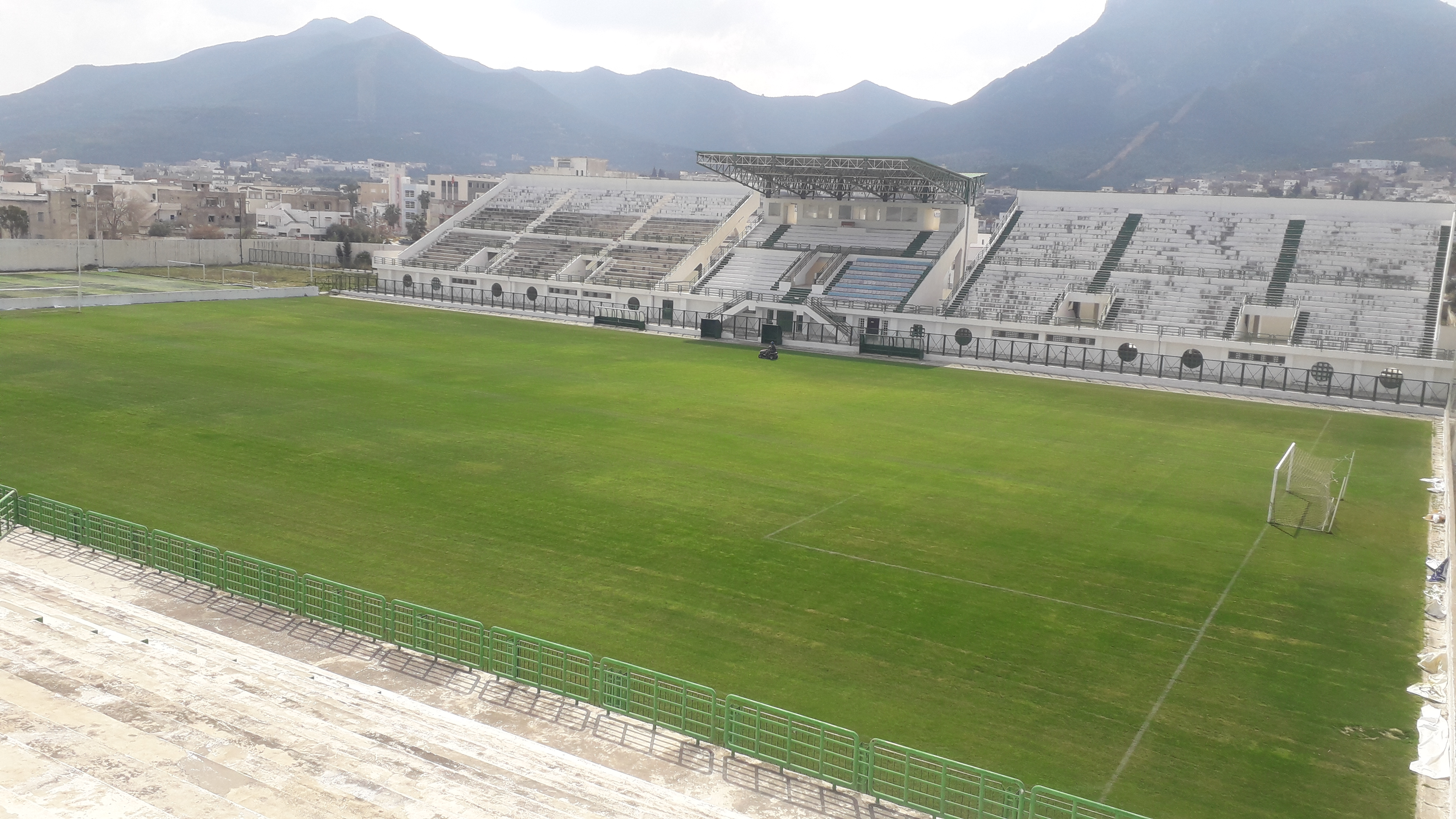
- Interactive map of Bou Kornine Stadium
- Full name: Stade Municipal de Hammam-Lif
- Location: Hammam-Lif, Tunisia
- Capacity: 15,000
- Surface: Grass

Construction
- Renovated: 2003

Tenant
- CS Hammam-Lif

Bou Kornine Stadium, officially Stade Municipal de Hammam-Lif, is a multi-purpose stadium in Hammam-Lif, Tunisia. It is currently used by football team CS Hammam-Lif.The stadium holds 15,000 people.

It takes its nickname from the Mount Bou Kornine, overlooking the Gulf of Tunis and Hammam-Lif city.
