= Elyas Bouzaiene =

Swedish footballer

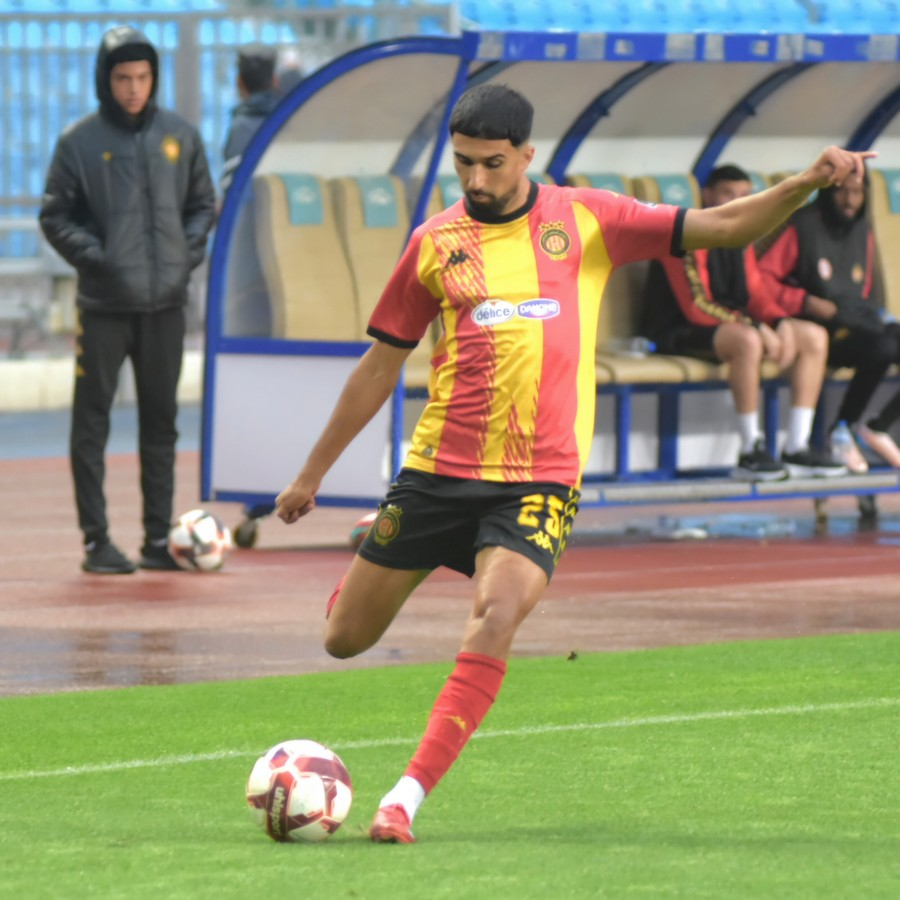
- Bouzaiene with Espérance de Tunis in 2025

Personal information
- Full name: Elyas Bouzaiene
- Date of birth: 8 September 1997 (age 29)
- Place of birth: Flemingsberg, Sweden
- Height: 1.84 m (6 ft 0 in)
- Position: Defender

Team information
- Current team: Espérance de Tunis
- Number: 25

Youth career
- Kristianstads FF

Senior career*
Years	Team	Apps	(Gls)
2016	Viby IF	16	(6)
2017–2020	Ifö Bromölla IF	74	(3)
2021	Kristianstad FC	25	(1)
2022	Lunds BK	13	(1)
2022–2024	Degerfors IF	53	(3)
2024	Västerås SK	17	(0)
2024–	Espérance de Tunis	15	(0)
- * Club domestic league appearances and goals as of 10 May 2026

Elyas Bouzaiene (born 8 September 1997) is a Swedish professional footballer who plays as a right back for Tunisian Ligue Professionnelle 1 club Espérance de Tunis.

== Career ==
Bouzaiene played youth football for Kristianstads FF but was not interested in training hard at the time. He narrowly decided against relinquishing his football career, opting to start his senior career with Viby in Division 6, the eighth tier. He moved to Bromölla and chose to play for Ifö Bromölla IF, where he played for several seasons before returning to Kristianstad. He contested the 2021 Division 2 with the team, claiming to have begun training "copious amounts" at the age of 22. Another club from the south of Sweden, Lunds BK showed their interest and signed Bouzaiene in 2022. When he was then signed by Degerfors IF in the summer of 2022, Bouzaiene had made the jump from the fourth to the first tier in only a few months. Bouzaiene made his Allsvenskan debut on 23 July 2022 against Mjällby, where he recorded one assist. His contract lasted through 2024.

Bouzaiene is the son of a Finnish mother and Tunisian father and was considered for Tunisia's national team in 2023. He ended up not being called up for the time being.
