= Bonheur Mugisha =

Rwandan footballer

Personal information
- Date of birth: 1 January 2000 (age 26)
- Place of birth: Rwanda
- Position: Midfielder

Team information
- Current team: Al-Hazem
- Number: 17

Youth career
- 2015–2017: Heroes FC

Senior career*
Years	Team	Apps	(Gls)
2017–2021	Heroes FC		
2020–2021	→ Mukura Victory Sports (loan)		
2021–2023	APR		
2023	Al Ahli Tripoli		
2023–2024	AS Marsa	16	(0)
2024–2025	Stade Tunisien	33	(6)
2025–2026	Al Masry SC	17	(0)
2026–	Al-Hazem	11	(1)

International career
2022–	Rwanda	17	(0)
- * Club domestic league appearances and goals as of 22 October 2026

Bonheur Mugisha (born 1 January 2000) is a Rwandan professional footballer who plays as a midfielder for the Saudi Team Al-Hazem and the Rwanda national team.

== Club career ==
Mugisha joined the Heroes Football Academy located in Mayange in the Bugesera District at age 15. By age 17 he was promoted to the first team which played in the Second Division. In 2019 he helped the club earn promotion to the Rwanda Premier League. The club was relegated back to the Second Division after one season and Mugisha joined Mukura Victory Sports on loan for the 2020–21 campaign. In July 2021 Mugisha joined Rwanda Premier League club APR on a two-year contract. In August 2021 Mugisha appeared in a friendly against AS Maniema Union of the Democratic Republic of the Congo in preparation for APR's fixtures in 2021–22 CAF Champions League qualifying. After defeating Mogadishu City Club in the First Round, APR fell to Étoile Sportive du Sahel of Tunisia 5–1 with Mugisha playing both legs of the Second Round series.

== International career ==
Mugisha was invited to join the national under-23 team in summer 2021 but did not because of the ongoing COVID-19 pandemic. In January 2022, he received his first call-up to the senior team for a pair of friendlies against Guinea. He made his senior international debut in the first match on 3 January 2022 and went on to appear in both fixtures.

== Career statistics ==
As of match played 29 March 2023

Rwanda national team
Year	Apps	Goals
2022	4	0
2023	3	0
Total	7	0
