= Elias Mokwana =

South African footballer (born 1999)

Personal information
- Full name: Elias Sepho Mokwana
- Date of birth: 8 September 1999 (age 27)
- Place of birth: KwaMhlanga, South Africa
- Height: 1.76 m (5 ft 9 in)
- Position: Winger

Team information
- Current team: Kaizer Chiefs
- Number: 14

Senior career*
Years	Team	Apps	(Gls)
2021–2022	Platinum City Rovers	22	(3)
2022–2024	Sekhukhune United	51	(5)
2024–2026	Espérance de Tunis	25	(3)
2025–2026	→ Al Hazem (loan)	24	(1)
2026–	Kaizer Chiefs	1	(1)

International career^{‡}
2023–	South Africa	12	(2)
- * Club domestic league appearances and goals as of 21 May 2026 ‡ National team caps and goals as of 26 December 2025

Elias Sepho Mokwana (born 8 September 1999) is a South African professional soccer player who plays as a winger for South African Premiership club Kaizer Chiefs and the South Africa national team.

== Club career ==
=== Platinum City Rovers ===
Mokwana played for National First Division side Platinum City Rovers.

=== Sekhukhune United ===
In May 2022, he joined South African Premiership side Sekhukhune United on a three-year deal.

=== Espérance Sportive de Tunis ===
In August 2024, he joined Tunisian Professional League 1 side Espérance Sportive de Tunis on a three-year contract.

On 22 August 2025, he was loaned to Saudi Pro League club Al-Hazem, with an option to buy.

== International career ==
On 1 December 2025, Mokwana was called up to the South Africa squad for the 2025 Africa Cup of Nations.

== International goals ==
No.	Date	Venue	Opponent	Score	Result	Competition
1.	21 March 2024	19 May 1956 Stadium, Annaba, Algeria	Andorra	1–1	1–1	2024 FIFA Series
2.	15 October 2024	Stade Alphonse Massemba-Débat, Brazzaville, Congo	Congo	1–0	1–1	2025 Africa Cup of Nations qualification
