= Lassaad Abdelli =

Tunisian footballer (born 1960)

Personal information
- Date of birth: 18 September 1960 (age 66)
- Place of birth: Mégrine, Tunisia
- Position: Forward

Youth career
- AMS Megrine
- –1980: Club Africain

Senior career*
Years	Team	Apps	(Gls)
1980–1986	Club Africain		
1986–1987	Berchem Sport		
1987–1988	Alemannia Aachen	15	(0)
1988–1989	RFC Bressoux	28	(5)

International career
1981–1989	Tunisia	22	(2)
- * Club domestic league appearances and goals

Lassaad Abdelli (born 18 September 1960) is a former Tunisian international footballer. He is the father of current professional footballer Youssef Abdelli.

== Career statistics ==
=== Club ===
Club	Season	League			Cup		Continental		Other		Total	
Club	Season	Division	Apps	Goals	Apps	Goals	Apps	Goals	Apps	Goals	Apps	Goals
Alemannia Aachen	1987–88	2. Bundesliga	15	0	2 (Note: Appearances in the DFB-Pokal)	1	–		0	0	17	1
Career total			15	0	2	1	0	0	0	0	17	1
