= Mustapha Ben Jannet Stadium =

Sports venue in Monastir, Tunisia

Coordinates: 35°46′35″N 10°49′13″E

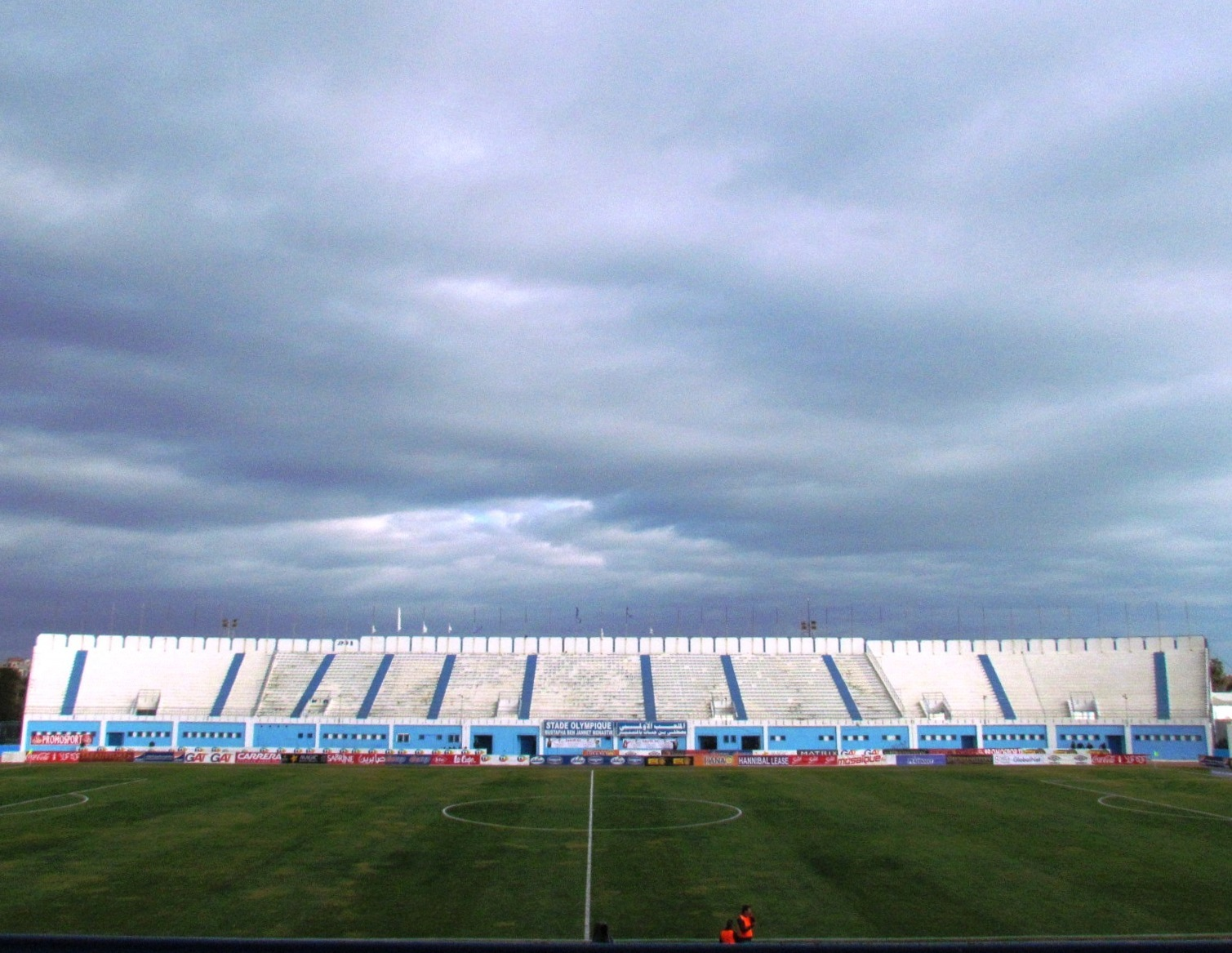
- Interactive map of Mustapha Ben Jannet Stadium
- Location: Monastir, Tunisia
- Owner: Government of Tunisia
- Capacity: 20,000
- Surface: Grass
- Field size: 105 x 68 m

Construction
- Opened: 1958
- Renovated: 2003
- Architect: Olivier-Clément Cacoub

Tenants
- US Monastir; Tunisia national football team

Mustapha Ben Jannet Stadium (Arabic: ملعب مصطفى بن جنات) is a multi-use stadium in Monastir, Tunisia. It is currently used by US Monastir, and was used for the 2004 African Cup of Nations. The stadium holds 20,000 people and sometimes, it's used as a home for Tunisia national football team.

== History ==
Inaugurated in 1958, the stadium initially had a capacity of 3,000. Designed by architect Olivier-Clément Cacoub, the structure used a technique based on cantilevered ball joints to create suspended tiers.

Over time, several expansion works were carried out, increasing its capacity to more than 10,000 in the late 1990s, and then, with further work ahead of the 2004 African Cup of Nations, to 20,000.

== Name ==
The stadium is named after Mustapha Ben Jannet, a militant activist of the early-20th Century Tunisian national movement, executed by French guards in 1953.

== Equipment ==
The stadium is integrated into the sports complex of the city of Monastir, Tunisia, located a few hundred meters from the city center, which extends over 11 hectares and includes a sports hall, an indoor swimming pool, a tennis complex and various golf courses, training.
