= Khalil Ayari =

Tunisian footballer (born 2005)

Personal information
- Date of birth: 2 February 2005 (age 21)
- Place of birth: Tunis, Tunisia
- Height: 1.78 m (5 ft 10 in)
- Position: Winger

Team information
- Current team: Dunkerque (on loan from Paris Saint-Germain)
- Number: 7

Youth career
- –2024: Stade Tunisien

Senior career*
Years	Team	Apps	(Gls)
2024–2026	Stade Tunisien	25	(2)
2025–2026	→ Paris Saint-Germain (loan)	0	(0)
2026–	Paris Saint-Germain	0	(0)
2026–	→ Dunkerque (loan)	0	(0)

International career^{‡}
2023–	Tunisia U20	8	(1)
2026–	Tunisia	1	(0)
- * Club domestic league appearances and goals as of 15:22, 2 September 2025 (UTC) ‡ National team caps and goals as of 13:07, 29 March 2026 (UTC)

Khalil Ayari (Arabic: خليل العياري; born 2 February 2005) is a Tunisian professional footballer who plays as a winger for Ligue 2 club Dunkerque, on loan from Ligue 1 club Paris Saint-Germain, and the Tunisia national team.

== Club career ==
A youth product of Stade Tunisien, Ayari signed his first professional contract with the club on 10 December 2023, a deal until 2028. On 19 September 2025, after a successful trial, he joined Ligue 1 club Paris Saint-Germain on loan with an option to buy and was assigned to the club's under-21 team.

After signing for Paris Saint-Germain on a permanent basis, Ayari joined Ligue 2 club Dunkerque on loan for the 2026–27 season.

== International career ==
Ayari was first called up to the Tunisia U20s for the 2023 UNAF U-20 Tournament. He made the final squad for the U20s at the 2025 U-20 Africa Cup of Nations. He was called up to the senior Tunisia national team for a set of friendlies in June 2025. In September 2025, he was called up to the Tunisia A' national team for another set of friendlies.

On 15 May 2026, Ayari was called up to the Tunisia national team for the 2026 FIFA World Cup.

== Honours ==
Stade Tunisien

- Tunisian Cup: 2023–24
