= 7 March Stadium =

Stadium in Tunisia

- Interactive map of 7 March Stadium
- Full name: 7 March Stadium
- Location: Ben Guerdane, Tunisia
- Coordinates: 33°09′10″N 11°12′22″E
- Capacity: 10,000
- Surface: Grass

Construction
- Opened: 2000

Tenant
- US Ben Guerdane

7 March Stadium (Arabic: ملعب 7 مارس, French: Le stade du 7 mars de Ben Guerdane) is a stadium in Ben Guerdane, Tunisia. It is currently used mostly for football. The stadium holds 10,000 of which 4,000 are covered, and was built in 2000. It is used by the US Ben Guerdane.

The date of 7 March corresponds to the day of the Battle of Ben Guerdane which took place on 7 March 2016 in Tunisia. The battle involved clashes between Tunisian security forces and Islamic state (IS) militants.

The stadium has been reported as hostile territory for USBG opponents.
