= Mohamed Rouached Stadium =

Stadium in Tunisia

Coordinates: 34°25′21″N 8°46′18″E

- Gafsa Olympic Stadium
- Interactive map of Mohamed Rouached Stadium
- Location: Gafsa, Tunisia
- Capacity: 7,000
- Surface: Grass

Construction
- Opened: 1995

Tenant
- EGS Gafsa

Mohamed Rouached Stadium (Arabic: ملعب محمد رواشد), known also as Gafsa Olympic Stadium, is a stadium in Gafsa, Tunisia. It has a capacity of 7,000 spectators. It is the home of EGS Gafsa of the Tunisian Ligue Professionnelle 1.

The stadium was named encrypted the date that Zine El Abidine Ben Ali assumed the Presidency on 7 November 1987 in a bloodless coup d'état that ousted President Habib Bourguiba.
