= Yan Sasse =

Brazilian footballer (born 1997)

Personal information
- Full name: Yhan Medeiros Sasse
- Date of birth: 24 June 1997 (age 29)
- Place of birth: Porto Alegre, Brazil
- Height: 1.73 m (5 ft 8 in)
- Position: Attacking midfielder

Team information
- Current team: Neftchi Fergana
- Number: 31

Youth career
- 2006–2010: Internacional
- 2011–2013: Red Bull Bragantino
- 2013–2016: Coritiba

Senior career*
Years	Team	Apps	(Gls)
2016–2021	Coritiba	61	(10)
2019	→ Vasco da Gama (loan)	6	(2)
2019–2020	→ Çaykur Rizespor (loan)	16	(1)
2021–2022	América Mineiro	5	(1)
2022–2023	Wellington Phoenix	23	(5)
2022–2023	Wellington Phoenix Reserves	1	(1)
2023–2026	Espérance de Tunis	46	(18)
2026–	Neftchi Fergana	0	(0)
- * Club domestic league appearances and goals as of 15 May 2026

Yhan Medeiros Sasse (born 24 June 1997), known as Yan Sasse, is a Brazilian professional footballer who plays as an attacking midfielder for Uzbekistan Super League club Neftchi Fergana.
