= 2024–25 Tunisian Ligue Professionnelle 1 =

Tunisian Ligue Professionnelle 1
- Season: 2024–25
- Dates: 31 August 2024 – 15 May 2025
- Champions: Espérance de Tunis (34th title)
- Relegated: EGS Gafsa; US Tataouine
- Champions League: Espérance de Tunis; US Monastir
- Confederation Cup: Étoile du Sahel; Stade Tunisien
- Matches: 240
- Goals: 488 (2.03 per match)
- Top goalscorer: Firas Chaouat (17 goals)
- Biggest home win: US Monastir 7–0 JS El Omrane (20 February 2025)
- Biggest away win: Olympique Béja 0–5 Espérance de Tunis (11 May 2025)
- Highest scoring: US Monastir 7–0 JS El Omrane (20 February 2025)
- Longest winning run: Étoile du Sahel (7 matches)
- Longest unbeaten run: Espérance de Tunis (15 matches)
- Longest winless run: JS El Omrane (22 matches)
- Longest losing run: US Tataouine (7 matches)

The 2024–25 Tunisian Ligue Professionnelle 1 (Tunisian Professional League) season was the 70th season of top-tier football in Tunisia.

Espérance de Tunis were the defending champions and successfully defended their title, winning their record-extending 34th title with one game left.

== Teams ==
16 teams contested the league.

=== Changes ===
▲ from 2023–24 Ligue Professionnelle 2	▼ to 2024–25 Ligue Professionnelle 2
AS Gabès; Espérance de Zarzis; JS El Omrane	AS Marsa

=== Location and stadiums ===
Locations of the 2024–25 Ligue 1 teams

Team	Location	Stadium	Capacity
AS Gabès	Gabès	Gabès Municipal Stadium	15,000
AS Soliman	Soliman	Soliman Municipal Stadium	3,000
Club Africain	Tunis (Bab Jedid)	Hammadi Agrebi Stadium	65,000
CA Bizertin	Bizerte	15 October Stadium	20,000
CS Sfaxien	Sfax	Taieb Mhiri Stadium	12,600
EGS Gafsa	Gafsa	Mohamed Rouached Stadium	7,000
ES Métlaoui	Métlaoui	Métlaoui Municipal Stadium	4,000
Étoile du Sahel	Sousse	Sousse Olympic Stadium	40,000
Espérance de Tunis	Tunis (Bab Souika)	Hammadi Agrebi Stadium	65,000
Espérance de Zarzis	Zarzis	Abdessalam Kazouz Stadium	10,000
JS El Omrane	Tunis (El Omrane)	Chedly Zouiten Stadium	18,000
Olympique Béja	Béja	Boujemaa Kmiti Stadium	15,000
Stade Tunisien	Tunis (Le Bardo)	Hédi Enneifer Stadium	11,000
US Ben Guerdane	Ben Guerdane	7 March Stadium	10,000
US Monastir	Monastir	Mustapha Ben Jannet Stadium	20,000
US Tataouine	Tataouine	Nejib Khattab Stadium	5,000

== Competition ==
The draw was held on 15 August 2024.

=== Table ===
Pos	Team	Pld	W	D	L	GF	GA	GD	Pts	Qualification or relegation
1	Espérance de Tunis (C)	30	19	9	2	57	22	+35	66	Qualification for the Champions League
2	US Monastir	30	17	11	2	42	11	+31	62	Qualification for the Champions League
3	Étoile du Sahel	30	19	4	7	45	24	+21	61	Qualification for the Confederation Cup
4	Club Africain	30	15	9	6	34	19	+15	54 (Note: Ranked on goal difference: Club Africain +15, Espérance de Zarzis +9.)	
5	Espérance de Zarzis	30	16	6	8	38	29	+9	54	
6	Stade Tunisien	30	13	10	7	29	21	+8	49	Qualification for the Confederation Cup
7	CS Sfaxien	30	11	11	8	31	19	+12	44	
8	ES Métlaoui	30	11	10	9	32	27	+5	43	
9	CA Bizertin	30	9	8	13	29	28	+1	35	
10	AS Soliman	30	7	10	13	18	38	−20	31	
11	US Ben Guerdane	30	6	12	12	28	33	−5	30	
12	Olympique Béja	30	7	8	15	19	37	−18	29	
13	AS Gabès	30	6	8	16	18	38	−20	26 (Note: Ranked on goal difference: AS Gabès –20, JS El Omrane –21.)	
14	JS El Omrane	30	4	14	12	25	46	−21	26	
15	EGS Gafsa (R)	30	6	4	20	24	43	−19	22	Relegation to Ligue 2
16	US Tataouine (R)	30	5	4	21	19	53	−34	19	Relegation to Ligue 2

Source: Tunisian Football Federation
Rules for classification: 1) points; 2) head-to-head points; 3) head-to-head goal difference; 4) goal difference; 5) total goals; 6) fairplay ranking; 7) playoff.
(C) Champions; (R) Relegated

=== Results ===
Home \ Away	ASG	ASS	CA	CAB	CSS	EGSG	ESM	ESS	EST	ESZ	JSO	OB	ST	USBG	USM	UST
AS Gabès		1–2	0–0	2–1	2–2	0–0	1–0	0–2	0–2	2–0	0–0	0–1	1–0	1–1	0–0	0–1
AS Soliman	0–0		0–0	0–2	1–4	1–1	1–0	0–0	1–2	1–1	1–0	1–0	0–2	0–0	0–1	0–0
Club Africain	1–0	4–2		1–0	0–0	2–1	3–0	0–2	1–3	1–0	2–0	2–0	1–0	0–0	0–0	1–0
CA Bizertin	2–0	0–0	1–0		1–1	1–0	1–1	1–2	2–1	4–1	4–1	3–0	1–1	0–1	0–0	3–1
CS Sfaxien	1–0	4–0	0–1	1–0		2–0	1–1	0–1	0–1	1–1	0–0	0–0	1–2	1–0	0–0	2–0
EGS Gafsa	0–1	4–0	0–3	2–0	0–2 (Note: CS Sfaxien were awarded a 2–0 win due to EGS Gafsa fans riot.)		2–0	2–3	0–3	1–3	0–0	0–2	0–1	2–1	0–1	2–0
ES Métlaoui	2–1	2–0	1–2	2–0	2–1	2–1		0–0	1–1	1–0	1–0	2–0	0–0	1–1	0–0	3–1
Étoile du Sahel	2–0	2–0	2–2	1–0	0–1	1–1	2–1		0–2	0–1	3–0	0–1	0–1	2–1	1–0	2–0
Espérance de Tunis	2–1	4–2	2–2	0–0	1–0	1–0	3–2	3–0		4–2	2–0	1–1	2–2	1–1	0–0	3–0
Espérance de Zarzis	2–0	1–0	1–0	1–0	1–0	1–0	1–0	2–3	1–0		2–1	1–0	2–0 (Note: Espérance de Zarzis were awarded a 2–0 win as a result of Stade Tunisien fielding the player Ghazi Ayadi despite receiving a suspension for accumulating cards.)	2–2	1–2	3–0
JS El Omrane	2–2	0–0	1–1	1–1	1–0	2–1	0–0	1–4	2–2	0–1		2–2	1–1	2–1	1–2	1–1
Olympique Béja	1–0	0–0	1–1	0–0	1–2	3–1	0–1	0–2	0–5	1–2	2–1		0–0	0–0	1–3	1–2
Stade Tunisien	2–1	0–1	1–0	1–0	1–1	2–1	1–0	1–3	0–1	1–1	0–0	3–0		1–0	0–0	3–1
US Ben Guerdane	3–0	0–1	0–2 (Note: Club Africain were awarded a 2–0 win as a result of US Ben Guerdane fielding the player Mohamed Habib Yeken despite receiving a suspension for accumulating cards.)	1–0	0–2	3–1	2–2	1–3	1–1	3–2	1–1	0–1	0–0		0–0	2–0
US Monastir	5–0	3–0	1–0	3–1	1–1	2–0	1–1	1–0	0–2	0–0	7–0	1–0	1–0	2–1		4–1
US Tataouine	1–2	0–3	0–1	2–0	0–0	0–1	0–3	1–2	0–2	1–1	2–4	1–0	1–2	2–1	0–1	

Source: Tunisian Football Federation
Legend: Blue = home team win; Yellow = draw; Red = away team win.
For upcoming matches, an "a" indicates there is an article about the rivalry between the two participants.

=== Clubs season-progress ===
Team ╲ Round	1	2	3	4	5	6	7	8	9	10	11	12	13	14	15	16	17	18	19	20	21	22	23	24	25	26	27	28	29	30
AS Gabès	D	L	D	W	L	L	W	L	W	L	L	D	D	D	L	L	L	L	L	D	W	L	L	L	L	W	L	D	W	D
AS Soliman	L	L	D	D	W	D	D	D	L	L	D	L	W	L	L	W	L	L	L	D	W	W	L	D	L	W	L	D	D	W
Club Africain	W	W	W	W	D	D	D	W	W	L	W	D	W	D	W	D	D	W	L	W	W	L	W	D	W	W	L	L	L	D
CA Bizertin	D	L	D	L	D	D	L	L	L	L	D	W	L	D	D	L	W	W	D	L	W	W	L	W	L	W	L	W	L	W
CS Sfaxien	D	W	L	W	D	D	D	D	W	W	L	L	L	D	L	W	W	D	W	L	L	W	D	D	W	D	D	L	W	W
EGS Gafsa	L	L	L	L	L	L	W	D	L	L	L	L	L	D	W	D	L	L	L	L	L	W	W	L	W	L	W	D	L	L
ES Métlaoui	W	L	L	D	D	D	L	D	D	W	L	W	W	D	W	L	D	W	L	W	L	W	D	W	L	L	D	W	D	W
Étoile du Sahel	L	L	W	D	L	D	L	W	W	W	W	W	W	D	W	W	W	W	W	W	W	L	W	L	W	W	W	D	W	L
Espérance de Tunis	W	W	D	D	L	D	W	W	D	W	W	D	W	D	W	W	W	W	W	W	L	W	W	D	D	W	W	W	W	D
Espérance de Zarzis	W	W	W	L	W	D	W	W	L	D	W	D	D	W	W	D	W	L	W	L	W	L	W	W	L	L	W	L	D	W
JS El Omrane	W	L	W	L	L	W	D	D	D	L	D	L	D	D	L	D	D	D	D	L	D	L	D	L	D	L	L	D	W	L
Olympique Béja	W	W	W	W	W	D	D	L	L	L	D	L	L	D	D	L	W	D	D	W	L	L	L	L	L	L	D	L	L	L
Stade Tunisien	L	W	D	W	W	W	D	D	W	W	W	W	L	W	W	D	D	L	D	L	L	W	D	W	L	D	D	D	W	L
US Ben Guerdane	L	L	L	L	W	D	D	D	D	W	L	D	D	D	L	D	L	D	D	L	L	L	D	D	W	L	W	W	L	W
US Monastir	D	W	D	W	W	W	D	D	W	D	W	W	W	D	L	W	L	W	D	W	W	W	D	W	W	W	W	D	D	D
US Tataouine	L	W	L	L	L	L	L	L	L	W	L	D	L	L	L	L	L	L	W	W	D	L	L	D	L	L	L	D	L	L

Source: Tunisian Football Federation
W = Win; D = Draw; L = Lose

=== Positions by round ===
Team ╲ Round	1	2	3	4	5	6	7	8	9	10	11	12	13	14	15	16	17	18	19	20	21	22	23	24	25	26	27	28	29	30
AS Gabès	7	11	12	9	11	12	9	11	9	10	10	11	11	11	11	13	13	14	14	14	13	13	13	14	15	14	15	15	14	13
AS Soliman	13	15	14	13	10	10	10	9	12	13	13	13	13	13	13	11	11	13	13	13	12	11	11	11	11	11	11	11	11	10
Club Africain	2	3	1	1	2	2	3	2	1	2	2	3	2	3	2	3	4	2	5	4	4	4	4	4	4	4	4	4	4	4
CA Bizertin	9	12	13	14	15	14	14	14	14	15	15	14	14	14	14	14	14	11	11	11	10	10	10	10	10	9	9	9	9	9
CS Sfaxien	8	5	7	6	7	8	8	8	7	6	7	8	9	8	9	8	7	8	7	8	8	8	8	8	7	7	7	8	7	7
EGS Gafsa	11	14	16	16	16	16	15	15	15	16	16	16	16	16	15	15	15	15	16	16	16	16	15	15	14	15	14	14	15	15
ES Métlaoui	3	10	10	10	9	9	11	12	11	11	11	9	8	9	7	7	9	7	8	7	7	7	7	7	8	8	8	7	8	8
Étoile du Sahel	12	13	9	11	12	11	13	10	10	8	8	6	6	6	6	6	5	3	2	2	2	3	2	3	3	3	3	3	3	3
Espérance de Tunis	1	1	4	4	6	7	6	5	6	5	5	5	4	5	4	2	1	1	1	1	1	1	1	1	1	1	1	1	1	1
Espérance de Zarzis	4	2	2	3	3	4	2	1	3	4	4	4	5	4	3	5	2	5	3	5	5	5	5	5	5	5	5	5	5	5
JS El Omrane	5	8	5	8	8	6	7	7	8	9	9	10	10	10	10	10	10	10	10	10	11	12	12	12	12	12	13	13	13	14
Olympique Béja	6	4	3	2	1	1	1	3	5	7	6	7	7	7	8	9	8	9	9	9	9	9	9	9	9	10	10	10	10	12
Stade Tunisien	14	7	8	7	5	5	5	6	4	1	1	1	3	2	1	1	3	6	6	6	6	6	6	6	6	6	6	6	6	6
US Ben Guerdane	15	16	15	15	13	13	12	13	13	12	12	12	12	12	12	12	12	12	12	12	14	14	14	13	13	13	12	12	12	11
US Monastir	10	6	6	5	4	3	4	4	2	3	3	2	1	1	5	4	6	4	4	3	3	2	3	2	2	2	2	2	2	2
US Tataouine	16	9	11	12	14	15	16	16	16	14	14	15	15	15	16	16	16	16	15	15	15	15	16	16	16	16	16	16	16	16

Leader
2025–26 CAF Champions League
2025–26 CAF Confederation Cup
Relegation to Ligue 2

Source: Tunisian Football Federation

== Season statistics ==
=== Top scorers ===
Rank	Goalscorer	Club	Goals
1	(Tunisia) Firas Chaouat	ESS	17
2	(Tunisia) Hazem Mastouri	USM	16
3	(Tunisia) Youssef Snana	ESZ	13
4	(Brazil) Yan Sasse	EST	10
5	(Algeria) Youcef Belaïli	EST	9
6	(Tunisia) Achref Jabri	ESZ & EST	8
6	(Tunisia) Ahmed Hadhri	JSO	8

=== Hat-tricks ===
Player	For	Against	Result	Date
(Cameroon) Roche Foning	AS Soliman	US Tataouine	3–0 (A)	28 December 2024
(Tunisia) Hazem Mastouri	US Monastir	AS Gabès	5–0 (H)	9 February 2025
(Tunisia) Firas Chaouat	Étoile du Sahel	JS El Omrane	4–1 (A)	19 April 2025

=== Scoring ===
- First goal of the season:
  (Tunisia) Ahmed Mazhoud for ES Métlaoui against AS Soliman (31 August 2024)
- Last goal of the season:
  (Algeria) Walid Meddahi for CA Bizertin against Olympique Béja (15 May 2025)

== Number of teams by Governorate ==
Position	Governorate	Number	Teams
1	Tunis	4	Club Africain, Espérance de Tunis, JS El Omrane, Stade Tunisien
2	Gafsa	2	EGS Gafsa, ES Métlaoui
2	Medenine	2	Espérance de Zarzis, US Ben Guerdane
4	Béja	1	Olympique Béja
4	Bizerte	1	CA Bizertin
4	Gabès	1	AS Gabès
4	Monastir	1	US Monastir
4	Nabeul	1	AS Soliman
4	Sfax	1	CS Sfaxien
4	Sousse	1	Étoile du Sahel
4	Tataouine	1	US Tataouine

== See also ==
- 2024–25 Tunisian Cup
- 2024–25 Tunisian Super Cup
