= 2025–26 Espérance Sportive de Tunis season =

Espérance de Tunis
2025–26 season
- President: Hamdi Meddeb
- Head coach: Maher Kanzari (until 8 February); Christian Bracconi (caretaker, from 9 to 21 February); Patrice Beaumelle (from 21 February to 11 May); Christian Bracconi (caretaker, from 11 May)
- Stadium: Hammadi Agrebi Stadium
- Ligue 1: Runners-up
- Tunisian Cup: Winners
- Tunisian Super Cup: Winners
- CAF Champions League: Semi-finals
- Top goalscorer: League: Kouceila Boualia (8); All: Kouceila Boualia (11)
- Biggest win: WS El Hamma 0–5 Espérance de Tunis (28 March 2026)
- Biggest defeat: Stade Tunisien 1–0 Espérance de Tunis (13 September 2025); US Monastir 2–1 Espérance de Tunis (19 January 2026); Stade Malien 1–0 Espérance de Tunis (8 February 2026); Espérance de Tunis 0–1 Mamelodi Sundowns (12 April 2026); Mamelodi Sundowns 1–0 Espérance de Tunis (18 April 2026); Espérance de Tunis 0–1 Club Africain (10 May 2026)
Home colours	Away colours	Third colours

The 2025–26 Espérance Sportive de Tunis season was the 107th season in existence and the club's 71st consecutive season in the top flight of Tunisian football.

In addition to the domestic league, Espérance de Tunis participated in this season editions of the Tunisian Cup, the Tunisian Super Cup and the CAF Champions League.

On the continental front, Espérance de Tunis left the Champions League from the semi-finals after a 2–0 loss to Mamelodi Sundowns on aggregate.

== Squad list ==
Note: Flags indicate the national team, defined under FIFA eligibility rules. Players may hold more than one non-FIFA nationality.

Staff

- (Tunisia) Chamseddine Dhaouadi (assistant manager)
- (Tunisia) Sami Zommit (assistant manager)
- (Tunisia) Ghassen Bouchareb (assistant manager)
- (France) Léo Djaoui (fitness manager)
- (Tunisia) Yassine Ben Ahmed (doctor)

Reserve team

- (Tunisia) Amenallah Frikhi

Other players under contract

- (Tunisia) Aziz Fellah
- (Tunisia) Salmen Trabelsi

No.	Nat.	Name	Date of Birth (Age)	Since	Signed from
Goalkeepers
1	(Tunisia)	Amenallah Memmiche	20 April 2004 (aged 22)	2023	(Tunisia) Youth system
16	(Tunisia)	Mokhtar Ifaoui	2 March 2003 (aged 23)	2025	(Tunisia) Youth system
26	(Tunisia)	Mohamed Sedki Debchi	28 October 1999 (aged 26)	2019	(Tunisia) AS Gabès
32	(Tunisia)	Bechir Ben Saïd	29 November 1992 (aged 33)	2024	(Tunisia) US Monastir
Defenders
2	(Tunisia)	Mohamed Ben Ali	16 February 1995 (aged 31)	2022	(Tunisia) CS Sfaxien
3	(Tunisia)	Elies Araar	7 October 2006 (aged 19)	2026	(France) Strasbourg
5	(Tunisia)	Yassine Meriah (C)	2 July 1993 (aged 32)	2022	(United Arab Emirates) Al Ain
6	(Tunisia)	Hamza Jelassi	29 September 1991 (aged 34)	2024	(Tunisia) Étoile du Sahel
12	(Tunisia)	Nidhal Laifi	1 May 1998 (aged 28)	2025	(Tunisia) Stade Tunisien
15	(Algeria)	Mohamed Amine Tougai	22 January 2000 (aged 26)	2020	(Algeria) NA Hussein Dey
18	(Tunisia)	Ala Derbali	19 May 2005 (aged 21)	2025	(Tunisia) Youth system
20	(Tunisia)	Mohamed Amine Ben Hamida	15 December 1995 (aged 30)	2016	(Tunisia) Youth system
23	(Mauritania)	Ibrahima Keita	8 November 2001 (aged 24)	2025	(Democratic Republic of the Congo) TP Mazembe
25	(Sweden)	Elyas Bouzaiene	8 September 1997 (aged 28)	2024	(Sweden) Västerås SK
35	(Tunisia)	Aziz Koudhai	7 August 2004 (aged 21)	2024	(Tunisia) Youth system
37	(Tunisia)	Mohamed Dräger	25 June 1996 (aged 29)	2026	(Germany) Eintracht Braunschweig
Midfielders
4	(Tunisia)	Wael Derbali	18 June 2003 (aged 22)	2023	(Tunisia) Olympique Béja
8	(Tunisia)	Houssem Tka	16 August 2000 (aged 25)	2023	(Tunisia) US Monastir
10	(Brazil)	Yan Sasse	24 June 1997 (aged 28)	2023	(New Zealand) Wellington Phoenix
14	(Nigeria)	Onuche Ogbelu	10 May 2003 (aged 23)	2023	(Nigeria) Nasarawa United
17	(Tunisia)	Haytham Dhaou	1 January 2005 (aged 21)	2025	(Tunisia) Youth system
21	(Ivory Coast)	Abdramane Konaté	25 June 2006 (aged 19)	2024	(Ivory Coast) San Pédro
24	(Tunisia)	Hamza Rafia	2 April 1999 (aged 27)	2026	(Italy) Lecce
27	(Tunisia)	Khalil Guenichi	11 December 2002 (aged 23)	2022	(Tunisia) Youth system
31	(Tunisia)	Chiheb Jebali	26 May 1996 (aged 30)	2025	(Tunisia) US Monastir
33	(Belgium)	Mohamed Mouhli	13 September 1998 (aged 27)	2025	(Belgium) RFC Liège
36	(Tunisia)	Arkem Taboubi	5 October 2006 (aged 19)	2025	(Tunisia) Youth system
38	(Tunisia)	Ghaith Ouahabi	2 May 2003 (aged 23)	2022	(Tunisia) Youth system
39	(Tunisia)	Moez Hadj Ali	9 August 1999 (aged 26)	2026	(Tunisia) US Monastir
Forwards
7	(Algeria)	Kouceila Boualia	14 March 2001 (aged 25)	2025	(Algeria) JS Kabylie
11	(Algeria)	Youcef Belaïli	14 March 1992 (aged 34)	2024	(Algeria) MC Alger
19	(Tunisia)	Achref Jabri	16 December 2001 (aged 24)	2022	(Tunisia) Youth system
22	(France)	Florian Danho	21 June 2000 (aged 25)	2025	(Denmark) Randers
29	(Mali)	Aboubacar Diakité	31 December 2006 (aged 19)	2025	(Mali) Djoliba
30	(Tunisia)	Koussay Maacha	21 May 2007 (aged 19)	2024	(Tunisia) Youth system
34	(Burkina Faso)	Jack Diarra	16 June 2006 (aged 19)	2025	(Burkina Faso) Salitas
40	(Tunisia)	Youssef Msakni	28 October 1990 (aged 35)	2025	(Qatar) Al Arabi
Manager	(France)	Christian Bracconi	25 November 1960 (aged 65)	2026	(Tunisia) Youth system

== Transfers ==
=== In ===
Date	Pos.	Name	From	Type	Source
1 July 2025	MF	(Tunisia) Aziz Fellah	(Tunisia) AS Gabès	End of loan	—
1 July 2025	FW	(Tunisia) Salmen Trabelsi	(Tunisia) AS Soliman	End of loan	—
1 July 2025	FW	(Burkina Faso) Jack Diarra	(Burkina Faso) Salitas	Transfer	
15 July 2025	DF	(Mauritania) Ibrahima Keita	(Democratic Republic of the Congo) TP Mazembe	Free transfer	
15 July 2025	FW	(Tunisia) Ahmed Bouassida	(Tunisia) ES Métlaoui	Transfer	
15 July 2025	FW	(Tunisia) Younes Rached	(Tunisia) ES Zarzis	Free transfer	
18 July 2025	DF	(Tunisia) Nidhal Laifi	(Tunisia) Stade Tunisien	Free transfer	—
25 August 2025	FW	(Algeria) Kouceila Boualia	(Algeria) JS Kabylie	Transfer	
19 September 2025	FW	(France) Florian Danho	(Denmark) Randers	Transfer	
21 November 2025	FW	(Tunisia) Youssef Msakni	(Qatar) Al Arabi	Free transfer	
18 December 2025	FW	(Burkina Faso) Jack Diarra	(Tunisia) AS Soliman	End of loan	
1 January 2026	MF	(Tunisia) Ghaith Ouahabi	(Georgia (country)) Dinamo Batumi	End of loan	—
9 January 2026	MF	(Tunisia) Hamza Rafia	(Italy) Lecce	Transfer	
9 January 2026	DF	(Tunisia) Elies Araar	(France) Strasbourg	Transfer	
10 January 2026	DF	(Tunisia) Mohamed Dräger	(Germany) Eintracht Braunschweig	Free transfer	
31 January 2026	MF	(Tunisia) Moez Hadj Ali	(Tunisia) US Monastir	Transfer	

=== Out ===
Date	Pos.	Name	To	Type	Source
1 July 2025	MF	(Tunisia) Montassar Triki	(Bulgaria) Dobrudzha Dobrich	End of contract	
1 July 2025	DF	(Tunisia) Raed Fedaa	(Tunisia) ES Métlaoui	End of contract	
1 July 2025	DF	(Tunisia) Ayman Ben Mohamed	(Tunisia) US Monastir	End of contract	
1 July 2025	GK	(Tunisia) Wassim Karoui	Free agent	End of contract	—
1 July 2025	MF	(Tunisia) Larry Azouni	(United Arab Emirates) Dibba Al Hisn	Free transfer	—
27 July 2025	DF	(Tunisia) Koussay Smiri	(Qatar) Al Khor	Loan	
20 August 2025	FW	(Brazil) Rodrigo Rodrigues	(Brazil) Coritiba	Free transfer	
25 August 2025	FW	(Tunisia) Zinedine Kada	(Tunisia) JS Kairouan	Loan	
25 August 2025	MF	(Togo) Roger Aholou	(Libya) Al Ittihad Tripoli	Free transfer	
26 August 2025	DF	(Tunisia) Mohamed Aloui	(Tunisia) US Ben Guerdane	Loan	
27 August 2025	FW	(South Africa) Elias Mokwana	(Saudi Arabia) Al Hazem	Loan	
3 September 2025	FW	(The Gambia) Kebba Sowe	(Tunisia) AS Soliman	Loan	—
3 September 2025	MF	(Tunisia) Wajdi Issaoui	(Tunisia) AS Soliman	Loan	—
12 September 2025	MF	(Tunisia) Mootez Zaddem	(Iraq) Erbil	Transfer	
19 September 2025	FW	(Tunisia) Rayen Hamrouni	(Tunisia) JS Kairouan	Loan	
19 September 2025	FW	(France) Bilel Sahli	(Tunisia) ES Zarzis	Contract termination	
20 September 2025	MF	(Tunisia) Zakaria El Ayeb	(Tunisia) AS Soliman	Loan	—
20 September 2025	FW	(Burkina Faso) Jack Diarra	(Tunisia) AS Soliman	Loan	—
20 September 2025	MF	(Tunisia) Khairi Meddaoui	(Tunisia) Stade Gabèsien	Loan	—
29 September 2025	DF	(Tunisia) Aziz Knani	(Libya) Olympic Azzaweya	Loan	—
22 December 2025	FW	(Tunisia) Ahmed Bouassida	(Tunisia) AS Soliman	Loan	
6 January 2026	FW	(Tunisia) Oussama Bouguerra	(Tunisia) Club Africain	Mutual termination	
14 January 2026	DF	(Tunisia) Amenallah Majhed	(Tunisia) AS Soliman	Loan	—
23 January 2026	FW	(Tunisia) Zinedine Kada	(Tunisia) US Ben Guerdane	Loan	
3 February 2026	DF	(Tunisia) Raed Bouchniba	(Tunisia) US Monastir	Transfer	
17 February 2026	FW	(Tunisia) Younes Rached	(Libya) Al Tahaddy	Loan	

== Friendlies ==
18 July 2025 Friendly	Espérance de Tunis	2–0	AS Marsa	Tunis
17:30	Bouchniba; Laifi			Stadium: Espérance de Tunis Training Center; Referee: Abdessalem Mani

25 July 2025 Friendly	Espérance de Tunis	1–1	Mauritania A'	Tabarka
17:30	Jelassi 18'		Hacen	Stadium: La Cigale; Referee: Montassar Belarbi

27 July 2025 Friendly	Espérance de Tunis	0–1	(Egypt) Al Masry	Tunis
17:30		Report	Mohsen 54'	Stadium: Espérance de Tunis Training Center; Attendance: 0 (close doors); Referee: Naim Hosni

30 July 2025 Friendly	Espérance de Tunis	3–0	AS Soliman	Tunis
17:30	Rached 23'; Belaïli 61'; Diakité 88'			Stadium: Espérance de Tunis Training Center; Attendance: 0 (close doors); Referee: Radhouane Belwaer

13 August 2025 Friendly	Espérance de Tunis	1–1	Sporting Ben Arous	Tunis
16:30	Amdouni		Ferchichi (pen.)	Stadium: Espérance de Tunis Training Center; Referee: Sofiane Ouertani

6 September 2025 Friendly	Espérance de Tunis	1–0	(Democratic Republic of the Congo) Saint-Éloi Lupopo	Tunis
17:00	Azouzi			Stadium: Espérance de Tunis Training Center; Attendance: 0 (close doors); Referee: Khalil Jary

15 November 2025 Friendly	Al Ittihad Al Asskary (Libya)	0–0	Espérance de Tunis	Benghazi, Libya
19:00 UTC+2				Stadium: Al Ittihad Al Asskary Stadium

24 December 2025 Friendly	Espérance de Tunis	9–0	AS Soukra	Tunis
11:00	Danho 8'; Diarra 14', 58'; Boualia 24', 29', 40'; Jebali 34'; Diakité 72', 75'			Stadium: Espérance de Tunis Training Center

27 December 2025 Friendly	Espérance de Tunis	1–0	AS Soliman	Tunis
12:00	Jabri 89'			Stadium: Espérance de Tunis Training Center

31 December 2025 Friendly	Espérance de Tunis	7–0	US Carthage	Tunis
11:00				Stadium: Espérance de Tunis Training Center

== Competitions ==
=== Overview ===
Competition	Record								Starting round	Final position / round	First match	Last match
Competition	G	W	D	L	GF	GA	GD	Win %	Starting round	Final position / round	First match	Last match
Ligue 1	30	18	9	3	45	11	+34	60.00	—N/a	Runners-up	9 August 2025	14 May 2026
Tunisian Cup	5	5	0	0	13	1	+12	100.00	Round of 32	Winners	28 March 2026	31 May 2026
Tunisian Super Cup	1	1	0	0	1	0	+1	100.00	Final	Winners	3 August 2025	
CAF Champions League	14	8	3	3	21	9	+12	57.14	First round	Semi-finals	21 September 2025	18 April 2026
Total	50	32	12	6	80	21	+59	64.00			3 August 2025	31 May 2026

Source: Competitions

=== Ligue 1 ===
The draw was held on 19 July 2025.

==== League table ====
Pos	Team	Pld	W	D	L	GF	GA	GD	Pts	Qualification or relegation
1	Club Africain (C)	30	19	9	2	43	10	+33	66	Qualification for the Champions League
2	Espérance de Tunis	30	18	9	3	45	11	+34	63	Qualification for the Champions League
3	CS Sfaxien	30	18	8	4	44	13	+31	62	Qualification for the Confederation Cup
4	Stade Tunisien	30	12	12	6	28	14	+14	48	
5	US Monastir	30	11	12	7	28	19	+9	45	

Source: Tunisian Football Federation
Rules for classification: 1) points; 2) head-to-head points; 3) head-to-head goal difference; 4) goal difference; 5) total goals; 6) fairplay ranking; 7) playoff.
(C) Champions

==== Results by round ====
Round	1	2	3	4	5	6	7	8	9	10	11	12	13	14	15	16	17	18	19	20	21	22	23	24	25	26	27	28	29	30
Ground	A	H	A	H	A	H	H	A	H	A	H	A	H	A	H	H	A	H	A	H	A	A	H	A	H	A	H	A	H	A
Result	D	D	W	W	L	W	W	W	W	D	W	W	W	D	W	W	L	W	W	W	D	W	W	D	D	D	D	W	L	W
Position	10	9	5	3	4	4	3	2	2	3	3	1	1	1	1	1	1	1	1	1	1	1	1	1	1	2	2	2	2	2
Points	1	2	5	8	8	11	14	17	20	21	24	27	30	31	34	37	37	40	43	46	47	50	53	54	55	56	57	60	60	63

Source: Competitive matches
A = Away; H = Home; W = Win; D = Draw; L = Loss

==== Score overview ====
Key: Espérance de Tunis goals shown first.

Opposition	Home score	Away score	Aggregate score	Double
AS Gabès	2–1	0–0	2–1	No
AS Marsa	1–0	3–0	4–0	✓
AS Soliman	2–0	3–0	5–0	✓
Club Africain	0–1	0–0	0–1	No
CA Bizertin	2–0	1–1	3–1	No
CS Sfaxien	0–0	2–1	2–1	No
ES Métlaoui	2–0	1–1	3–1	No
Étoile du Sahel	1–0	0–0	1–0	No
ES Zarzis	2–2	0–0	2–2	No
JS Kairouan	1–0	4–0	5–0	✓
JS El Omrane	4–0	1–0	5–0	✓
Olympique Béja	2–0	3–0	5–0	✓
Stade Tunisien	1–0	0–1	1–1	No
US Ben Guerdane	4–0	1–0	5–0	✓
US Monastir	1–1	1–2	2–3	No

==== Matches ====
9 August 2025 Round 1	AS Gabès	0–0	Espérance de Tunis	Gabès
16:30	Beji (yellow card) 62'; Ben Amor (yellow card) 72'; Trabelsi (yellow card) 72'; Yaakoubi (yellow card) 78'; Letifi (yellow card) 90+6'	Report	Guenichi (yellow card) 57'; Ben Hamida (yellow card) 86'	Stadium: Gabès Municipal Stadium; Referee: Fredj Abdellaoui

15 August 2025 Round 2	Espérance de Tunis	1–1	US Monastir	Tunis
16:30	Ben Ali (yellow card) 14'; Konaté 20'	Report	Hadj Ali (yellow card) 13'; Abdelli 67'	Stadium: Hammadi Agrebi Stadium; Referee: Sadok Selmi

21 August 2025 Round 3	JS Kairouan	0–4	Espérance de Tunis	Kairouan
16:30		Report	Ogbelu 22'; Belaïli 26'; Jabri 45+2'; Sasse 48'	Stadium: Hamda Laouani Stadium; Referee: Naim Hosni

28 August 2025 Round 4	Espérance de Tunis	2–0	AS Soliman	Tunis
16:30	Tougai (yellow card) 26', (goal) 89'; Meriah (yellow card) 43'; Sasse 45+2'; Tka (yellow card) 85'	Report	Maatougui (yellow card) 54'; Konaté (yellow card) 84'	Stadium: Hammadi Agrebi Stadium; Referee: Mohamed Ali Karouia

13 September 2025 Round 5	Stade Tunisien	1–0	Espérance de Tunis	Tunis
16:00	Khemissi 41'; Khalfa (yellow card) 90+1'; Sghaier (yellow card) 90+7'	Report	Meriah (yellow card) 20'; Belaïli (yellow card) 59'; Ben Ali (yellow card) 88'	Stadium: Hédi Enneifer Stadium; Referee: Nidhal Letaief

16 September 2025 Round 6	Espérance de Tunis	2–0	ES Métlaoui	Tunis
15:30	Boualia 22'; Ogbelu (yellow card) 42'; Jabri 78'	Report	Ben Salem (red card) 36'	Stadium: Hammadi Agrebi Stadium; Referee: Khaled Gouider

24 September 2025 Round 7	Espérance de Tunis	2–0	Olympique Béja	Tunis
15:30	Jebali 9'; Sasse (yellow card) 49'; Danho 84'	Report	Smaoui (yellow card) 41'; Houiji (yellow card) 76'; Hammami (yellow card) 81'	Stadium: Hammadi Agrebi Stadium; Referee: Hosni Neili

1 October 2025 Round 8	AS Marsa	0–3	Espérance de Tunis	Tunis
15:00		Report	Danho (yellow card) 33', (goal) 67'; Belaïli (yellow card) 44'; Tougai 45+2'; Jabri 90+3'	Stadium: Abdelaziz Chtioui Stadium; Referee: Walid Mansri

5 October 2025 Round 9	Espérance de Tunis	1–0	Étoile du Sahel	Tunis
15:00	Sasse 27'; Belaïli (yellow card) 30'; Ben Saïd (yellow card) 82'; Boualia (yellow card) 90+1'	Report	Ben Mazouz (yellow card) 45+3'	Stadium: Hammadi Agrebi Stadium; Referee: Khaled Gouider

22 October 2025 Round 10	ES Zarzis	0–0	Espérance de Tunis	Zarzis
15:00	Khalfa (yellow card) 56'; Ghouma (yellow card) 76'; Kassab (yellow card) 90+3'	Report	Jelassi (yellow card) 41'; Guenichi (yellow card) 45+1'; Meriah (yellow card) 80', (penalty missed) 85'	Stadium: Abdessalam Kazouz Stadium; Referee: Amir Loussif

30 October 2025 Round 11	Espérance de Tunis	2–0	CA Bizertin	Tunis
14:30	Boualia (yellow card) 40', (goal) 41'; Jabri 90'	Report	Ben Jaballah (yellow card) 60'	Stadium: Hammadi Agrebi Stadium; Referee: Hamza Jaied

2 November 2025 Round 12	CS Sfaxien	1–2	Espérance de Tunis	Sfax
14:30	Mondeko (yellow card) 25'; Baccar 44' (pen.); Ogbole (yellow card) 71'	Report	Jelassi 27' (pen.); Jebali (yellow card) 33'; Belaïli 45'; Ben Ali (yellow card) 46'	Stadium: Taieb Mhiri Stadium; Referee: Fredj Abdellaoui

6 November 2025 Round 13	Espérance de Tunis	4–0	JS El Omrane	Tunis
14:30	Belaïli 50' (pen.); Jebali 60'; Maacha 70'; Jelassi 90+4'	Report	Mhamdi (yellow card) 76'	Stadium: Hammadi Agrebi Stadium; Referee: Houssem Ben Sassi

9 November 2025 Round 14	Club Africain	0–0	Espérance de Tunis	Tunis
14:30	Khadhraoui (yellow card) 73'; Sghaier (yellow card) 90+4'	Report	Danho (yellow card) 23', (penalty missed) 55'; Jebali (yellow card) 34'; Tka (yellow card) 75'; Ogbelu (yellow card) 78'	Stadium: Hammadi Agrebi Stadium; Referee: Amir Loussif

10 January 2026 Round 15	Espérance de Tunis	4–0	US Ben Guerdane	Tunis
14:00	Tka 32'; Jelassi (yellow card) 38'; Sasse 48'; Keita (yellow card) 60'; Boualia 63'; Taboubi 79'; Ben Hamida (yellow card) 85'	Report		Stadium: Hammadi Agrebi Stadium; Referee: Hosni Neili

15 January 2026 Round 16	Espérance de Tunis	2–1	AS Gabès	Tunis
14:00	Sasse 11' (pen.); Tka (yellow card) 29'; Jelassi 45+3' (pen.); Msakni (penalty missed) 78'; Jabri (yellow card) 90+4'	Report	Khadhraoui 36'; Helali (yellow card) 77'	Stadium: Hammadi Agrebi Stadium; Referee: Seif Ouertani

19 January 2026 Round 17	US Monastir	2–1	Espérance de Tunis	Monastir
14:00	Ben Youssef (yellow card) 27', (goal) 31'; El Djebali (yellow card) 41'; Abdelli 48', (yellow card) 48', (red card) 66'; Harzi (yellow card) 79'; Hallaoui (yellow card) 88'; Gadiaga (yellow card) 90'	Report	Diarra 10', (yellow card) 56'; Jelassi (yellow card) 27'; Guenichi (yellow card) 44'; Jebali (yellow card) 65'	Stadium: Mustapha Ben Jannet Stadium; Referee: Mehrez Melki

27 January 2026 Round 18	Espérance de Tunis	1–0	JS Kairouan	Tunis
14:00	Boualia 29'; Jabri (yellow card) 88'	Report	Lakhder (yellow card) 28'; Bejaoui (red card) 90+3'	Stadium: Hammadi Agrebi Stadium; Referee: Khaled Gouider

17 February 2026 Round 19	AS Soliman	0–3	Espérance de Tunis	Béja
14:00	Khmiri (penalty missed) 59'	Report	Danho 15'; Boualia 31'; Ben Hamida 45+1'	Stadium: Boujemaa Kmiti Stadium; Referee: Walid Mansri

21 February 2026 Round 20	Espérance de Tunis	1–0	Stade Tunisien	Tunis
13:00	Tka 21'; Jelassi (yellow card) 29'; Danho (yellow card) 71'	Report	Sghaier (yellow card) 33'; N'Diaye (yellow card) 68'; Haboubi (yellow card) 73'; Ndaw (yellow card) 85'; Camara (yellow card) 90+2'	Stadium: Hammadi Agrebi Stadium; Referee: Amir Loussif

25 February 2026 Round 21	ES Métlaoui	1–1	Espérance de Tunis	Métlaoui
13:00	Bouani (yellow card) 57'; Mansri (yellow card) 61'; Bodian 77' (pen.)	Report	Jabri 54'; Keita (yellow card) 74'	Stadium: Métlaoui Municipal Stadium; Referee: Nidhal Letaief

1 March 2026 Round 22	Olympique Béja	0–3	Espérance de Tunis	Béja
13:00	Sidibé (yellow card) 35'; Ben Rajeh (yellow card) 35'; Hadouchi (yellow card) 55'; Marzouki (yellow card) 64'	Report	Tougai (yellow card) 16'; Diarra 45+4'; Danho (yellow card) 57'; Boualia 65'; Jabri 71'	Stadium: Boujemaa Kmiti Stadium; Referee: Mehrez Melki

7 March 2026 Round 23	Espérance de Tunis	1–0	AS Marsa	Tunis
13:00	Jelassi 10' (pen.); Tougai (yellow card) 25'	Report	Khaloui (yellow card) 52'; Gneba (yellow card) 56'; Salem (yellow card) 88'	Stadium: Hammadi Agrebi Stadium; Referee: Achref Harakati

4 April 2026 Round 24	Étoile du Sahel	0–0	Espérance de Tunis	Sousse
14:30		Report	Ben Hamida (yellow card) 19'; Jebali (yellow card) 44'; Keita (yellow card) 49'	Stadium: Sousse Olympic Stadium; Referee: Bacem Belaid

23 April 2026 Round 25	Espérance de Tunis	2–2	ES Zarzis	Tunis
15:00	Danho 7', (yellow card) 58'; Boualia 45'	Report	Kassab 40' (pen.), (yellow card) 75'; Nyengue 45+5', (yellow card) 68'; Oluwaseun (yellow card) 55'; Tajouri (yellow card) 90'	Stadium: Hammadi Agrebi Stadium; Referee: Hamza Jaied

26 April 2026 Round 26	CA Bizertin	1–1	Espérance de Tunis	Bizerte
15:30	Chihi 56'	Report	Jelassi (yellow card) 26'; Jebali (yellow card) 36'; Ben Hamida (yellow card) 40'; Boualia 51'; Jabri (yellow card) 90+8'	Stadium: 15 October Stadium; Referee: Fredj Abdellaoui

30 April 2026 Round 27	Espérance de Tunis	0–0	CS Sfaxien	Tunis
15:30	Tougai (penalty missed) 33'	Report	Trabelsi (yellow card) 40'; Ouédraogo (yellow card) 53'; Maâloul (yellow card) 90'; Taifour (yellow card) 90+4'	Stadium: Hammadi Agrebi Stadium; Referee: Amir Loussif

4 May 2026 Round 28	JS El Omrane	0–1	Espérance de Tunis	Tunis
16:00	Ben Amor (yellow card) 13' (yellow-red card) 29'; Mgannem (yellow card) 55'	Report	Ben Ali (yellow card) 55'; Jelassi (red card) 72'; Meriah 78' (pen.)	Stadium: Chedly Zouiten Stadium; Referee: Mehrez Melki

10 May 2026 Round 29	Espérance de Tunis	0–1	Club Africain	Tunis
16:00		Report	Elsharimi (yellow card) 45+4'; Harzi (yellow card) 72'; Ben Ali (yellow card) 84'; Kinzumbi (yellow card) 90+8' (yellow-red card) 90+12'; Zaalouni 90+14'	Stadium: Hammadi Agrebi Stadium; Referee: Christian-Petru Ciochirca (Austria)

14 May 2026 Round 30	US Ben Guerdane	0–1	Espérance de Tunis	Ben Guerdane
16:00	Yeken (yellow card) 7'	Report	Rafia 38'; Jebali (yellow card) 85'	Stadium: 7 March Stadium; Referee: Bacem Belaid

==== Results summary ====
Overall								Home						Away					
Pld	W	D	L	GF	GA	GD	Pts	W	D	L	GF	GA	GD	W	D	L	GF	GA	GD
30	18	9	3	45	11	+34	63	11	3	1	25	5	+20	7	6	2	20	6	+14

Source: Competitive matches

=== Tunisian Cup ===
Espérance de Tunis entered the tournament in the round of 32, as they were part of the 2025–26 Tunisian Ligue Professionnelle 1.

28 March 2026 Round of 32	WS El Hamma	0–5	Espérance de Tunis	El Hamma
13:30		Report	Jabri 15', 26'; Hmidhi 51', 65'; Bouhouche 54' (o.g.)	Stadium: El Hamma Artificial Stadium; Referee: Amine Fkaier

17 May 2026 Round of 16	ES Métlaoui	1–3	Espérance de Tunis	Métlaoui
15:30	Bahri (yellow card) 62'; Fedaa 68'; Boukhris (yellow card) 90'	Report	Tka 1'; Jabri 58'; Boualia 60', (yellow card) 85'; Rafia (yellow card) 90+3'	Stadium: Métlaoui Municipal Stadium; Referee: Sadok Selmi

21 May 2026 Quarter-finals	BS Bou Hajla	0–3	Espérance de Tunis	Bou Hajla
15:30	Labidi (yellow card) 4'; Ounalli (yellow card) 33'; Midani (red card) 69'	Report	Ben Ali 38'; Meriah (yellow card) 45'; Rafia (yellow card) 71'; Dhaou 86'; Touati 90+3'	Stadium: Bou Hajla Municipal Stadium; Referee: Nidhal Letaief

24 May 2026 Semi-finals	JS El Omrane	0–1	Espérance de Tunis	Tunis
15:30	Hammami (yellow card) 43'; Jouini (yellow card) 90+2'	Report	Danho 31'	Stadium: Chedly Zouiten Stadium; Referee: Hosni Neili

31 May 2026 Final	ES Zarzis	0–1	Espérance de Tunis	Tunis
16:00	Diallo (yellow card) 45+1'; Mahersi (yellow card) 87'; Ghanmi (red card) 90+10'	Report	Konaté (yellow card) 41'; Rafia 62'; Laifi (yellow card) 72'; Jelassi (yellow card) 86'; Jebali (yellow card) 87'; Ben Ali (yellow card) 89'	Stadium: Hammadi Agrebi Stadium; Attendance: 26,000; Referee: Nidhal Letaief

=== Tunisian Super Cup ===
3 August 2025 Final	Espérance de Tunis	1–0	Stade Tunisien	Tunis
17:15	Belaïli 39' (pen.); Guenichi (yellow card) 45+5'; Ben Hamida (yellow card) 69'	Report	Sahraoui (yellow card) 37'; Touré (yellow card) 61'; Atoui (yellow card) 90+4'	Stadium: Hammadi Agrebi Stadium; Attendance: 25,000; Referee: Houssem Boularesse

=== CAF Champions League ===
==== Qualifying rounds ====
The draw of the qualifying rounds was held on 9 August 2025.

===== First round =====
21 September 2025 First leg	AS FAN (Niger)	0–3	(Tunisia) Espérance de Tunis	Niamey
15:30 UTC+1		Report	Boualia 4'; Diakité 54', 86'	Stadium: Stade Général Seyni Kountché; Referee: Ousmane Diakité (Mali)

27 September 2025 Second leg	Espérance de Tunis (Tunisia)	4–1 (7–1 agg.)	(Niger) AS FAN	Tunis
18:00 UTC+1	Belaïli 19'; Sasse 37'; Keita 65'; Meriah 90+4' (pen.)	Report	Addae 33'	Stadium: Hammadi Agrebi Stadium; Referee: Ruth Bilembi (Congo)

===== Second round =====
18 October 2025 First leg	Rahimo (Burkina Faso)	0–1	(Tunisia) Espérance de Tunis	Ouagadougou
16:00 UTC+0		Report	Danho 45+7'	Stadium: Stade du 4 Août; Referee: Boubou Traoré (Mali)

26 October 2025 Second leg	Espérance de Tunis (Tunisia)	3–0 (4–0 agg.)	(Burkina Faso) Rahimo	Tunis
17:00 UTC+1	Jelassi 33'; Danho 51'; Jabri 72'	Report		Stadium: Hammadi Agrebi Stadium; Referee: Jalal Jayed (Morocco)

==== Group stage ====
The draw of the group stage was held on 3 November 2025.

Group D

Pos	Team	Pld	W	D	L	GF	GA	GD	Pts	Qualification	SML	EST	APL	SSC
1	(Mali) Stade Malien	6	3	2	1	5	2	+3	11	Advance to knockout stage	—	1–0	2–0	2–1
2	(Tunisia) Espérance de Tunis	6	2	3	1	6	4	+2	9	Advance to knockout stage	0–0	—	2–0	1–0
3	(Angola) Petro de Luanda	6	1	3	2	3	6	−3	6		0–0	1–1	—	1–1
4	(Tanzania) Simba	6	1	2	3	5	7	−2	5		1–0	2–2	0–1	—

Source: CAF

22 November 2025 Matchday 1	Espérance de Tunis (Tunisia)	0–0	(Mali) Stade Malien	Tunis
17:00 UTC+1	Jelassi (yellow card) 58'	Report	M. Traoré (yellow card) 43'; Bode (yellow card) 67'; Mandjan (yellow card) 90+2'	Stadium: Hammadi Agrebi Stadium; Referee: Abongile Tom (South Africa)

29 November 2025 Matchday 2	Petro de Luanda (Angola)	1–1	(Tunisia) Espérance de Tunis	Luanda
17:00 UTC+1	Reis 49'; Pereira (yellow card) 68'	Report	Diakité 89'	Stadium: Estádio 11 de Novembro; Referee: Jean-Jacques Ndala (DR Congo)

24 January 2026 Matchday 3	Espérance de Tunis (Tunisia)	1–0	(Tanzania) Simba	Tunis
17:00 UTC+1	Diarra 21'	Report	Nangu (yellow card) 55'; Gueye (yellow card) 90+3'	Stadium: Hammadi Agrebi Stadium; Referee: Jean Pierre Nguiene (Congo)

1 February 2026 Matchday 4	Simba (Tanzania)	2–2	(Tunisia) Espérance de Tunis	Dar es Salaam
16:00 UTC+3	Kapombe 39'; Kagoma 45'; Gueye (yellow card) 45+4'; Denis (yellow card) 68'; Kanté (yellow card) 73'	Report	Diakité 64'; Boualia 79'; Jelassi (penalty missed) 90+4'	Stadium: Benjamin Mkapa Stadium; Referee: Luxolo Badi (South Africa)

8 February 2026 Matchday 5	Stade Malien (Mali)	1–0	(Tunisia) Espérance de Tunis	Bamako
16:00 UTC+0	Nkeng (yellow card) 24'; Bode (yellow card) 47'; D. Coulibaly 54'	Report	Keita (yellow card) 72'	Stadium: Stade du 26 Mars; Referee: Mustapha Ghorbal (Algeria)

14 February 2026 Matchday 6	Espérance de Tunis (Tunisia)	2–0	(Angola) Petro de Luanda	Tunis
17:00 UTC+1	Tka (yellow card) 28'; Boualia (yellow card) 40'; Diakité 46'; Jebali (yellow card) 74'; Jelassi (yellow card) 79'; Diarra 81'	Report	Hossi (yellow card) 43'	Stadium: Hammadi Agrebi Stadium; Referee: Peter Waweru (Kenya)

==== Knockout stage ====
The draw of the knockout stage was held on 17 February 2026.

===== Quarter-finals =====
15 March 2026 First leg	Espérance de Tunis (Tunisia)	1–0	(Egypt) Al Ahly	Tunis
22:00 UTC+1	Ogbelu (yellow card) 29'; Tougai 73' (pen.)	Report	Hany (yellow card) 26'; Ibrahim (yellow card) 78'; Belammari (yellow card) 82'	Stadium: Hammadi Agrebi Stadium; Attendance: 50,000; Referee: Issa Sy (Senegal)

21 March 2026 Second leg	Al Ahly (Egypt)	2–3 (2–4 agg.)	(Tunisia) Espérance de Tunis	Cairo
21:00 UTC+2	Trézéguet 10'; Jelassi 84' (o.g.); Hany (yellow card) 90+2'	Report	Tougai (yellow card) 63', (goal) 78' (pen.); Danho 68'; Keita (yellow card) 70'; Tka (yellow card) 89'; Jelassi 90+4'	Stadium: Cairo International Stadium; Attendance: 0 (close doors); Referee: Jalal Jayed (Morocco)

===== Semi-finals =====
12 April 2026 First leg	Espérance de Tunis (Tunisia)	0–1	(South Africa) Mamelodi Sundowns	Tunis
20:00 UTC+1	Jelassi (yellow card) 70'	Report	León 51'; Williams (yellow card) 73'; Kekana (red card) 84'; Mudau (yellow card) 90+5'	Stadium: Hammadi Agrebi Stadium; Attendance: 50,000; Referee: Mustapha Ghorbal (Algeria)

18 April 2026 Second leg	Mamelodi Sundowns (South Africa)	1–0 (2–0 agg.)	(Tunisia) Espérance de Tunis	Pretoria
15:00 UTC+2	León (penalty missed) 35', 35'; Sales (yellow card) 45+4'; Morena (yellow card) 49'	Report	Ben Saïd (yellow card) 32'; Diakité (yellow card) 72'; Ogbelu (yellow card) 90+4'	Stadium: Loftus Versfeld Stadium; Attendance: 45,000; Referee: Omar Artan (Somalia)

== Statistics ==
- ^{‡} Player played at least one game and left the club during the season.
- ^{y} Youth team

=== Playing statistics ===
- Players with no appearances are not included on the list.

No.	Pos	Nat	Player	Total		Ligue 1		Tunisian Cup		CAF Champions League		Tunisian Super Cup	
No.	Pos	Nat	Player	Apps	Goals	Apps	Goals	Apps	Goals	Apps	Goals	Apps	Goals
1	GK	(Tunisia)	Amenallah Memmiche	16	0	9	0	5	0	1	0	1	0
2	DF	(Tunisia)	Mohamed Ben Ali	26	1	19	0	4	1	3	0	0	0
3	DF	(Tunisia)	Elies Araar	1	0	1	0	0	0	0	0	0	0
4	MF	(Tunisia)	Wael Derbali	3	0	1	0	0	0	1	0	1	0
5	DF	(Tunisia)	Yassine Meriah	26	2	15	1	4	0	6	1	1	0
6	DF	(Tunisia)	Hamza Jelassi	40	5	22	3	4	0	14	2	0	0
7	FW	(Algeria)	Kouceila Boualia	39	11	23	8	2	1	14	2	0	0
8	MF	(Tunisia)	Houssem Tka	44	3	27	2	3	1	13	0	1	0
10	MF	(Brazil)	Yan Sasse	29	6	17	5	2	0	10	1	0	0
11	FW	(Algeria)	Youcef Belaïli	15	5	12	3	0	0	2	1	1	1
12	DF	(Tunisia)	Nidhal Laifi	28	0	16	0	5	0	6	0	1	0
14	MF	(Nigeria)	Onuche Ogbelu	41	1	27	1	2	0	12	0	0	0
15	DF	(Algeria)	Mohamed Amine Tougai	22	4	14	2	0	0	7	2	1	0
17	MF	(Tunisia)	Haytham Dhaou	15	1	9	0	5	1	0	0	1	0
18	DF	(Tunisia)	Ala Derbali	3	0	2	0	1	0	0	0	0	0
19	FW	(Tunisia)	Achref Jabri	35	10	25	6	4	3	5	1	1	0
20	DF	(Tunisia)	Mohamed Amine Ben Hamida	39	1	25	1	1	0	12	0	1	0
21	MF	(Ivory Coast)	Abdramane Konaté	36	1	18	1	3	0	14	0	1	0
22	FW	(France)	Florian Danho	37	8	22	4	3	1	12	3	0	0
23	DF	(Mauritania)	Ibrahima Keita	30	1	16	0	2	0	11	1	1	0
24	MF	(Tunisia)	Hamza Rafia	19	2	12	1	5	1	2	0	0	0
25	DF	(Sweden)	Elyas Bouzaiene	10	0	7	0	1	0	2	0	0	0
26	GK	(Tunisia)	Mohamed Sedki Debchi	1	0	0	0	1	0	0	0	0	0
27	MF	(Tunisia)	Khalil Guenichi	27	0	19	0	2	0	5	0	1	0
29	FW	(Mali)	Aboubacar Diakité	23	5	10	0	0	0	12	5	1	0
30	FW	(Tunisia)	Koussay Maacha	10	1	4	1	1	0	5	0	0	0
31	MF	(Tunisia)	Chiheb Jebali	42	2	29	2	5	0	8	0	0	0
32	GK	(Tunisia)	Bechir Ben Saïd	34	0	21	0	0	0	13	0	0	0
34	FW	(Burkina Faso)	Jack Diarra	20	4	9	2	3	0	8	2	0	0
35	DF	(Tunisia)	Aziz Koudhai	2	0	2	0	0	0	0	0	0	0
36	MF	(Tunisia)	Arkem Taboubi	6	1	3	1	2	0	1	0	0	0
37	DF	(Tunisia)	Mohamed Dräger	10	0	6	0	0	0	4	0	0	0
38	MF	(Tunisia)	Ghaith Ouahabi	3	0	2	0	1	0	0	0	0	0
39	MF	(Tunisia)	Moez Hadj Ali	19	0	9	0	4	0	6	0	0	0
40	FW	(Tunisia)	Youssef Msakni	5	0	2	0	0	0	3	0	0	0
y	FW	(Tunisia)	Amenallah Hmidhi	9	2	7	0	2	2	0	0	0	0
y	FW	(Tunisia)	Amenallah Touati	1	1	0	0	1	1	0	0	0	0
‡	DF	(Tunisia)	Raed Bouchniba	3	0	1	0	0	0	2	0	0	0
‡	FW	(Tunisia)	Ahmed Bouassida	7	0	5	0	0	0	1	0	1	0
‡	FW	(Tunisia)	Younes Rached	3	0	1	0	0	0	1	0	1	0

Source: Competitions

=== Goals ===
Rank	No.	Pos	Nat	Player	Ligue 1	Tunisian Cup	CAF Champions League	Tunisian Super Cup	Total
1	7	FW	(Algeria)	Kouceila Boualia	8	1	2	0	11
2	19	FW	(Tunisia)	Achref Jabri	6	3	1	0	10
3	22	FW	(France)	Florian Danho	4	1	3	0	8
4	10	MF	(Brazil)	Yan Sasse	5	0	1	0	6
4	6	DF	(Tunisia)	Hamza Jelassi	4	0	2	0	6
6	11	FW	(Algeria)	Youcef Belaïli	3	0	1	1	5
6	29	FW	(Mali)	Aboubacar Diakité	0	0	5	0	5
8	34	FW	(Burkina Faso)	Jack Diarra	2	0	2	0	4
8	15	DF	(Algeria)	Mohamed Amine Tougai	2	0	2	0	4
10	8	MF	(Tunisia)	Houssem Tka	3	0	0	0	3
11	31	MF	(Tunisia)	Chiheb Jebali	2	0	0	0	2
11	y	FW	(Tunisia)	Amenallah Hmidhi	0	2	0	0	2
11	5	DF	(Tunisia)	Yassine Meriah	1	0	1	0	2
11	24	MF	(Tunisia)	Hamza Rafia	1	1	0	0	2
15	21	MF	(Ivory Coast)	Abdramane Konaté	1	0	0	0	1
15	14	MF	(Nigeria)	Onuche Ogbelu	1	0	0	0	1
15	23	DF	(Mauritania)	Ibrahima Keita	0	0	1	0	1
15	30	FW	(Tunisia)	Koussay Maacha	1	0	0	0	1
15	36	MF	(Tunisia)	Arkem Taboubi	1	0	0	0	1
15	20	DF	(Tunisia)	Mohamed Amine Ben Hamida	1	0	0	0	1
15	2	DF	(Tunisia)	Mohamed Ben Ali	0	1	0	0	1
15	17	MF	(Tunisia)	Haytham Dhaou	0	1	0	0	1
15	y	FW	(Tunisia)	Amenallah Touati	0	1	0	0	1
Own goals					0	1	0	0	1
Total					45	13	21	1	80

=== Assists ===
Rank	No.	Pos	Nat	Player	Ligue 1	Tunisian Cup	CAF Champions League	Tunisian Super Cup	Total
1	11	FW	(Algeria)	Youcef Belaïli	6	0	1	0	7
2	7	FW	(Algeria)	Kouceila Boualia	3	0	2	0	5
2	31	MF	(Tunisia)	Chiheb Jebali	1	2	2	0	5
4	20	DF	(Tunisia)	Mohamed Amine Ben Hamida	2	0	2	0	4
4	23	DF	(Mauritania)	Ibrahima Keita	3	0	1	0	4
6	27	MF	(Tunisia)	Khalil Guenichi	2	0	1	0	3
6	21	MF	(Ivory Coast)	Abdramane Konaté	0	0	3	0	3
6	10	MF	(Brazil)	Yan Sasse	3	0	0	0	3
6	22	FW	(France)	Florian Danho	3	0	0	0	3
6	2	DF	(Tunisia)	Mohamed Ben Ali	2	1	0	0	3
11	8	MF	(Tunisia)	Houssem Tka	2	0	0	0	2
11	6	DF	(Tunisia)	Hamza Jelassi	2	0	0	0	2
11	39	MF	(Tunisia)	Moez Hadj Ali	1	0	1	0	2
11	37	DF	(Tunisia)	Mohamed Dräger	2	0	0	0	2
11	34	FW	(Burkina Faso)	Jack Diarra	0	2	0	0	2
16	15	DF	(Algeria)	Mohamed Amine Tougai	0	0	1	0	1
16	14	MF	(Nigeria)	Onuche Ogbelu	1	0	0	0	1
16	40	FW	(Tunisia)	Youssef Msakni	0	0	1	0	1
16	y	FW	(Tunisia)	Amenallah Hmidhi	0	1	0	0	1
16	12	DF	(Tunisia)	Nidhal Laifi	0	1	0	0	1
16	36	MF	(Tunisia)	Arkem Taboubi	0	1	0	0	1
16	24	MF	(Tunisia)	Hamza Rafia	0	1	0	0	1
Total					32	9	15	0	56

=== Cleansheets ===
Rank	No.	Nat	Player	Ligue 1	Tunisian Cup	CAF Champions League	Tunisian Super Cup	Total
1	32	(Tunisia)	Bechir Ben Saïd	14	0	7	0	21
2	1	(Tunisia)	Amenallah Memmiche	7	3.5	0	1	11.5
3	26	(Tunisia)	Mohamed Sedki Debchi	0	0.5	0	0	0.5
Total				21	4	7	1	33

=== Disciplinary record ===
N	P	Nat.	Name	Ligue 1			Tunisian Cup			CAF Champions League			Tunisian Super Cup			Total			Notes
N	P	Nat.	Name	Yellow card	Second yellow card	Red card	Yellow card	Second yellow card	Red card	Yellow card	Second yellow card	Red card	Yellow card	Second yellow card	Red card	Yellow card	Second yellow card	Red card	Notes
6	DF	(Tunisia)	Hamza Jelassi	5		1	1			3						9		1	
31	MF	(Tunisia)	Chiheb Jebali	6			1			1						8			
8	MF	(Tunisia)	Houssem Tka	3						2						5			
23	DF	(Mauritania)	Ibrahima Keita	3						2						5			
22	FW	(France)	Florian Danho	5												5			
20	DF	(Tunisia)	Mohamed Amine Ben Hamida	4									1			5			
2	DF	(Tunisia)	Mohamed Ben Ali	4			1									5			
27	MF	(Tunisia)	Khalil Guenichi	3									1			4			
15	DF	(Algeria)	Mohamed Amine Tougai	2						2						4			
14	MF	(Nigeria)	Onuche Ogbelu	2						2						4			
7	FW	(Algeria)	Kouceila Boualia	2			1			1						4			
5	DF	(Tunisia)	Yassine Meriah	3			1									4			
11	FW	(Algeria)	Youcef Belaïli	3												3			
19	FW	(Tunisia)	Achref Jabri	3												3			
32	GK	(Tunisia)	Bechir Ben Saïd	1						1						2			
24	MF	(Tunisia)	Hamza Rafia				2									2			
10	MF	(Brazil)	Yan Sasse	1												1			
34	FW	(Burkina Faso)	Jack Diarra	1												1			
29	FW	(Mali)	Aboubacar Diakité							1						1			
21	MF	(Ivory Coast)	Abdramane Konaté				1									1			
12	DF	(Tunisia)	Nidhal Laifi				1									1			

Source: Competitions
Ordered by (red card) , (second yellow card) and (yellow card)
(yellow card) = Number of bookings; (second yellow card) = Number of sending offs after a second yellow card; (red card) = Number of sending offs by a direct red card.

== Milestones ==
=== Debuts ===
The following players made their competitive debuts for the first team during the campaign.

Legend

– Indicates youth academy debut.

Date	No.	Pos.	Nat.	Player	Age	Final score	Opponent	Competition
3 August 2025	23	DF	(Mauritania)	Ibrahima Keita	23	1–0 (N)	Stade Tunisien	Tunisian Super Cup
3 August 2025	28	FW	(Tunisia)	Younes Rached	26	1–0 (N)	Stade Tunisien	Tunisian Super Cup
3 August 2025	12	DF	(Tunisia)	Nidhal Laifi	27	1–0 (N)	Stade Tunisien	Tunisian Super Cup
3 August 2025	33	FW	(Tunisia)	Ahmed Bouassida	21	1–0 (N)	Stade Tunisien	Tunisian Super Cup
15 August 2025	36	MF	(Tunisia)	Arkem Taboubi	18	1–1 (H)	US Monastir	Tunisian Ligue Professionnelle 1
28 August 2025	7	FW	(Algeria)	Kouceila Boualia	24	2–0 (H)	AS Soliman	Tunisian Ligue Professionnelle 1
24 September 2025	22	FW	(France)	Florian Danho	25	2–0 (H)	Olympique Béja	Tunisian Ligue Professionnelle 1
30 October 2025	18	DF	(Tunisia)	Ala Derbali	20	2–0 (H)	CA Bizertin	Tunisian Ligue Professionnelle 1
10 January 2026	40	FW	(Tunisia)	Youssef Msakni (Note: Msakni played previously for Espérance de Tunis from 2008 to 2013, scoring 48 goals.)	35	4–0 (H)	US Ben Guerdane	Tunisian Ligue Professionnelle 1
19 January 2026	34	FW	(Burkina Faso)	Jack Diarra	19	2–1 (A)	US Monastir	Tunisian Ligue Professionnelle 1
19 January 2026	24	MF	(Tunisia)	Hamza Rafia	26	2–1 (A)	US Monastir	Tunisian Ligue Professionnelle 1
27 January 2026	37	DF	(Tunisia)	Mohamed Dräger	29	1–0 (H)	JS Kairouan	Tunisian Ligue Professionnelle 1
8 February 2026	39	MF	(Tunisia)	Moez Hadj Ali	26	1–0 (A)	(Mali) Stade Malien	CAF Champions League
17 February 2026	3	DF	(Tunisia)	Elies Araar	19	0–3 (A)	AS Soliman	Tunisian Ligue Professionnelle 1
7 March 2026	y	FW	(Tunisia)	Amenallah Hmidhi	19	1–0 (H)	AS Marsa	Tunisian Ligue Professionnelle 1
21 May 2026	y	FW	(Tunisia)	Amenallah Touati	18	0–3 (A)	BS Bou Hajla	Tunisian Cup

(H) — Home; (A) — Away; (N) — Neutral

=== First goals ===
The following players scored their first goals for Espérance de Tunis first team during the campaign.

Date	No.	Pos.	Nat.	Player	Age	Score	Final score	Opponent	Competition
16 September 2025	7	FW	(Algeria)	Kouceila Boualia	24	1–0 (H)	2–0 (H)	ES Métlaoui	Tunisian Ligue Professionnelle 1
21 September 2025	29	FW	(Mali)	Aboubacar Diakité	18	0–2 (A)	0–3 (A)	(Niger) AS FAN	CAF Champions League
24 September 2025	22	FW	(France)	Florian Danho	25	2–0 (H)	2–0 (H)	Olympique Béja	Tunisian Ligue Professionnelle 1
27 September 2025	23	DF	(Mauritania)	Ibrahima Keita	23	3–1 (H)	4–1 (H)	(Niger) AS FAN	CAF Champions League
10 January 2026	36	MF	(Tunisia)	Arkem Taboubi	19	4–0 (H)	4–0 (H)	US Ben Guerdane	Tunisian Ligue Professionnelle 1
19 January 2026	34	FW	(Burkina Faso)	Jack Diarra	19	0–1 (A)	2–1 (A)	US Monastir	Tunisian Ligue Professionnelle 1
28 March 2026	y	FW	(Tunisia)	Amenallah Hmidhi	19	0–3 (A)	0–5 (A)	WS El Hamma	Tunisian Cup
14 May 2026	24	MF	(Tunisia)	Hamza Rafia	27	0–1 (A)	0–1 (A)	US Ben Guerdane	Tunisian Ligue Professionnelle 1
21 May 2026	2	DF	(Tunisia)	Mohamed Ben Ali	31	0–1 (A)	0–3 (A)	BS Bou Hajla	Tunisian Cup
21 May 2026	17	MF	(Tunisia)	Haytham Dhaou	21	0–2 (A)	0–3 (A)	BS Bou Hajla	Tunisian Cup
21 May 2026	y	FW	(Tunisia)	Amenallah Touati	18	0–3 (A)	0–3 (A)	BS Bou Hajla	Tunisian Cup

(H) — Home; (A) — Away; (N) — Neutral
