= 2025 FIFA Club World Cup Group D =

Soccer tournament group stage

Group D was one of eight groups in the 2025 FIFA Club World Cup, an international club soccer tournament hosted in the United States and organized by FIFA. It comprised four teams: Flamengo of Brazil; Espérance de Tunis of Tunisia; Chelsea of England; and Los Angeles FC of the United States. Teams qualified by winning the respective continental club championships of their confederation or through a ranking of their performance in competitions. Only two clubs per country were allowed to qualify unless three or four won their respective continental club championship. The 2025 edition of the FIFA Club World Cup was the first in the tournament's history to be played under its quadrennial format with 32 teams. The group's matches began on June 16 and concluded on June 24.

== Teams ==
The four teams in Group D were decided by the FIFA Club World Cup draw held by FIFA on December 5, 2024, in the Miami area. The 32 participants were divided into four pots based on their confederation and ranking within FIFA's club ranking system. Each of the eight groups would receive one team from each pot. Teams from the same confederation could not be drawn into the same group except for those from UEFA, which had twelve slots; teams from the same national association were not able to be drawn into the same group.

2025 FIFA Club World Cup Group D draw
Draw position	Team	Association	Pot	Confederation	Method of qualification	Date of qualification	Appearance	Last appearance	Previous best performance
D1	Flamengo	Brazil	1	CONMEBOL	Winners of the 2022 Copa Libertadores	March 14, 2023 (Note: Qualification was confirmed on this date by FIFA.)	3rd	2022	Runners-up (2019)
D2	Espérance de Tunis	Tunisia	4	CAF	CAF four-year ranking (1st among eligible)	April 26, 2024	4th	2019	Fifth place (2018, 2019)
D3	Chelsea	England	2	UEFA	Winners of the 2020–21 UEFA Champions League	March 14, 2023	3rd	2021	Winners (2021)
D4	Los Angeles FC (Note: Originally, León was set to participate in the tournament as the winner of the 2023 CONCACAF Champions League. On March 21, 2025, the team was removed from the competition due to violating the FIFA Appeal Committee's rules on multi-club ownership, as León and Pachuca have the same owner. On May 6, 2025, the Court of Arbitration for Sport rejected appeals by León, Pachuca, and Alajuelense. FIFA confirmed León's exclusion and that the winner of the playoff match between Los Angeles FC and América would qualify for the Club World Cup. On May 31, Los Angeles FC beat América 2–1 in extra time to claim the final tournament spot.)	United States	3	CONCACAF	Winners of play-in match	May 31, 2025	1st	—N/a	—N/a

== Standings ==
Pos	Team	Pld	W	D	L	GF	GA	GD	Pts	Qualification
1	(Brazil) Flamengo	3	2	1	0	6	2	+4	7	Advance to knockout stage
2	(England) Chelsea	3	2	0	1	6	3	+3	6	Advance to knockout stage
3	(Tunisia) Espérance de Tunis	3	1	0	2	1	5	−4	3	
4	(United States) Los Angeles FC	3	0	1	2	1	4	−3	1	

Source: FIFA
Rules for classification: Group stage tiebreakers

In the round of 16:

- The winners of Group D, Flamengo, advanced to play the runners-up of Group C, Bayern Munich.
- The runners-up of Group D, Chelsea, advanced to play the winners of Group C, Benfica.

== Matches ==
Matches took place from June 16 to 24. All times listed are local.

=== Chelsea vs Los Angeles FC ===
June 16, 2025
3:00 pm EDT

Chelsea (England)	2–0	(United States) Los Angeles FC
Neto 34'; Fernández 79'	Report

Mercedes-Benz Stadium, Atlanta
Attendance: 22,137
Referee: Jesús Valenzuela (Venezuela)

Chelsea	Los Angeles FC

GK	1	(Spain) Robert Sánchez
RB	24	(England) Reece James (c)	(yellow card) 36'	(substituted off) 46'
CB	4	(England) Tosin Adarabioyo	(yellow card) 45'
CB	6	(England) Levi Colwill
LB	3	(Spain) Marc Cucurella	(yellow card) 75'
CM	45	(Belgium) Roméo Lavia		(substituted off) 46'
CM	25	(Ecuador) Moisés Caicedo		(substituted off) 84'
AM	10	(England) Cole Palmer		(substituted off) 84'
RF	7	(Portugal) Pedro Neto
CF	15	(Senegal) Nicolas Jackson		(substituted off) 64'
LF	11	(England) Noni Madueke		(substituted off) 64'
Substitutions:
MF	8	(Argentina) Enzo Fernández		(substituted on) 46'
DF	27	(France) Malo Gusto		(substituted on) 46'
FW	32	(England) Tyrique George		(substituted on) 64'
FW	9	(England) Liam Delap		(substituted on) 64'
MF	14	(Portugal) Dário Essugo		(substituted on) 84'
FW	18	(France) Christopher Nkunku		(substituted on) 84'
Manager:
(Italy) Enzo Maresca

GK	1	(France) Hugo Lloris
RB	14	(Spain) Sergi Palencia	(yellow card) 90+2'
CB	33	(United States) Aaron Long (c)
CB	4	(Colombia) Eddie Segura
LB	24	(United States) Ryan Hollingshead
DM	6	(Brazil) Igor Jesus		(substituted off) 81'
CM	8	(United States) Mark Delgado		(substituted off) 87'
CM	11	(United States) Timothy Tillman		(substituted off) 87'
RF	27	(El Salvador) Nathan Ordaz		(substituted off) 38'
CF	17	(United States) Jeremy Ebobisse		(substituted off) 46'
LF	99	(Gabon) Denis Bouanga
Substitutions:
FW	30	(Venezuela) David Martínez	(yellow card) 58'	(substituted on) 38'
FW	9	(France) Olivier Giroud		(substituted on) 46'
MF	23	(United States) Frankie Amaya		(substituted on) 81'
MF	20	(Ghana) Yaw Yeboah		(substituted on) 87'
DF	5	(Brazil) Marlon		(substituted on) 87'
Manager:
(United States) Steve Cherundolo

Man of the Match:
Pedro Neto (Chelsea)

Assistant referees:
Jorge Urrego (Venezuela)
Tulio Moreno (Venezuela)
Fourth official:
Jean-Jacques Ndala (DR Congo)
Video assistant referee:
Juan Soto (Venezuela)
Assistant video assistant referee:
Hernán Mastrángelo (Argentina)
Support video assistant referee:
Alejandro Hernández Hernández (Spain)

=== Flamengo vs Espérance de Tunis ===
June 16, 2025
9:00 pm EDT

Flamengo (Brazil)	2–0	(Tunisia) Espérance de Tunis
De Arrascaeta 17'; Luiz Araújo 70'	Report

Lincoln Financial Field, Philadelphia
Attendance: 25,797
Referee: Danny Makkelie (Netherlands)

Flamengo	Espérance de Tunis

GK	1	(Argentina) Agustín Rossi
RB	2	(Uruguay) Guillermo Varela
CB	3	(Brazil) Léo Ortiz
CB	4	(Brazil) Léo Pereira
LB	6	(Brazil) Ayrton Lucas
CM	5	(Chile) Erick Pulgar
CM	21	(Italy) Jorginho		(substituted off) 74'
RW	7	(Brazil) Luiz Araújo		(substituted off) 90+1'
AM	10	(Uruguay) Giorgian de Arrascaeta		(substituted off) 73'
LW	8	(Brazil) Gerson (c)		(substituted off) 65'
CF	9	(Brazil) Pedro		(substituted off) 65'
Substitutions:
FW	27	(Brazil) Bruno Henrique	(yellow card) 84'	(substituted on) 65'
FW	50	(Ecuador) Gonzalo Plata		(substituted on) 65'
FW	30	(Brazil) Michael		(substituted on) 73'
MF	29	(Brazil) Allan		(substituted on) 74'
FW	11	(Brazil) Everton		(substituted on) 90+1'
Manager:
(Brazil) Filipe Luís

GK	32	(Tunisia) Bechir Ben Saïd
RB	2	(Tunisia) Mohamed Ben Ali	(yellow card) 25'	(substituted off) 84'
CB	5	(Tunisia) Yassine Meriah (c)
CB	15	(Algeria) Mohamed Amine Tougai	(yellow card) 69'
LB	20	(Tunisia) Mohamed Amine Ben Hamida
CM	38	(Tunisia) Khalil Guenichi	(yellow card) 64'	(substituted off) 75'
CM	14	(Nigeria) Onuche Ogbelu
RW	10	(Brazil) Yan Sasse		(substituted off) 46'
AM	36	(Tunisia) Chiheb Jebali		(substituted off) 46'
LW	11	(Algeria) Youcef Belaïli	(yellow card) 38'
CF	9	(Brazil) Rodrigo Rodrigues		(substituted off) 75'
Substitutions:
MF	21	(Ivory Coast) Abdramane Konaté		(substituted on) 46'
FW	24	(South Africa) Elias Mokwana		(substituted on) 46'
FW	19	(Tunisia) Achref Jabri		(substituted on) 75'
MF	4	(Tunisia) Mohamed Wael Derbali		(substituted on) 75'
DF	13	(Tunisia) Raed Bouchniba		(substituted on) 84'
Manager:
(Tunisia) Maher Kanzari

Man of the Match:
Giorgian de Arrascaeta (Flamengo)

Assistant referees:
Hessel Steegstra (Netherlands)
Jan de Vries (Netherlands)
Fourth official:
Ma Ning (China)
Video assistant referee:
Rob Dieperink (Netherlands)
Assistant video assistant referee:
Fu Ming (China)
Support video assistant referee:
Tomasz Kwiatkowski (Poland)

=== Flamengo vs Chelsea ===
June 20, 2025
2:00 pm EDT

Flamengo (Brazil)	3–1	(England) Chelsea
Bruno Henrique 62'; Danilo 65'; Wallace Yan 83'	Report	Neto 13'

Lincoln Financial Field, Philadelphia
Attendance: 54,019
Referee: Iván Barton (El Salvador)

Flamengo	Chelsea

GK	1	(Argentina) Agustín Rossi
RB	43	(Brazil) Wesley França		(substituted off) 82'
CB	13	(Brazil) Danilo
CB	4	(Brazil) Léo Pereira
LB	6	(Brazil) Ayrton Lucas
CM	5	(Chile) Erick Pulgar	(yellow card) 85'
CM	21	(Italy) Jorginho
RW	8	(Brazil) Gerson (c)	(yellow card) 74'	(substituted off) 82'
AM	10	(Uruguay) Giorgian de Arrascaeta		(substituted off) 56'
LW	7	(Brazil) Luiz Araújo		(substituted off) 90+2'
CF	50	(Ecuador) Gonzalo Plata	(yellow card) 90+2'	(substituted off) 90+2'
Substitutions:
FW	27	(Brazil) Bruno Henrique		(substituted on) 56'
FW	64	(Brazil) Wallace Yan		(substituted on) 82'
DF	2	(Uruguay) Guillermo Varela		(substituted on) 82'
FW	30	(Brazil) Michael		(substituted on) 90+2'
FW	9	(Brazil) Pedro		(substituted on) 90+2'
Manager:
(Brazil) Filipe Luís

GK	1	(Spain) Robert Sánchez
RB	27	(France) Malo Gusto
CB	23	(England) Trevoh Chalobah
CB	6	(England) Levi Colwill
LB	3	(Spain) Marc Cucurella
CM	24	(England) Reece James (c)		(substituted off) 64'
CM	25	(Ecuador) Moisés Caicedo	(yellow card) 11'
CM	8	(Argentina) Enzo Fernández
AM	10	(England) Cole Palmer		(substituted off) 82'
CF	9	(England) Liam Delap	(yellow card) 45+2'	(substituted off) 64'
CF	7	(Portugal) Pedro Neto	(yellow card) 23'
Substitutions:
FW	15	(Senegal) Nicolas Jackson	(red card) 68'	(substituted on) 64'
MF	45	(Belgium) Roméo Lavia		(substituted on) 64'
FW	38	(Spain) Marc Guiu		(substituted on) 82'
FW	11	(England) Noni Madueke		(substituted on) 82'
Manager:
(Italy) Enzo Maresca

Man of the Match:
Bruno Henrique (Flamengo)

Assistant referees:
David Morán (El Salvador)
Henry Pupiro (El Salvador)
Fourth official:
Ma Ning (China)
Video assistant referee:
Guillermo Pacheco (Mexico)
Assistant video assistant referee:
Érick Galindo (Mexico)
Support video assistant referee:
Carlos del Cerro Grande (Spain)

=== Los Angeles FC vs Espérance de Tunis ===
June 20, 2025
5:00 pm CDT

Los Angeles FC (United States)	0–1	(Tunisia) Espérance de Tunis
	Report	Belaïli 70'

Geodis Park, Nashville
Attendance: 13,651
Referee: Espen Eskås (Norway)

Los Angeles FC	Espérance de Tunis

GK	1	(France) Hugo Lloris
RB	14	(Spain) Sergi Palencia
CB	33	(United States) Aaron Long (c)
CB	4	(Colombia) Eddie Segura
LB	24	(United States) Ryan Hollingshead		(substituted off) 80'
DM	6	(Brazil) Igor Jesus
CM	8	(United States) Mark Delgado		(substituted off) 80'
CM	11	(United States) Timothy Tillman	(yellow card) 23'	(substituted off) 80'
RF	30	(Venezuela) David Martínez		(substituted off) 46'
CF	9	(France) Olivier Giroud		(substituted off) 88'
LF	99	(Gabon) Denis Bouanga
Substitutions:
FW	26	(Netherlands) Javairô Dilrosun		(substituted on) 46'
MF	20	(Ghana) Yaw Yeboah		(substituted on) 80'
DF	5	(Brazil) Marlon		(substituted on) 80'
MF	23	(United States) Frankie Amaya		(substituted on) 80'
FW	17	(United States) Jeremy Ebobisse		(substituted on) 88'
Manager:
(United States) Steve Cherundolo

GK	32	(Tunisia) Bechir Ben Saïd
RB	2	(Tunisia) Mohamed Ben Ali
CB	5	(Tunisia) Yassine Meriah (c)
CB	15	(Algeria) Mohamed Amine Tougai
LB	20	(Tunisia) Mohamed Amine Ben Hamida
CM	38	(Tunisia) Khalil Guenichi
CM	14	(Nigeria) Onuche Ogbelu
RW	24	(South Africa) Elias Mokwana		(substituted off) 61'
AM	21	(Ivory Coast) Abdramane Konaté		(substituted off) 76'
LW	11	(Algeria) Youcef Belaïli	(yellow card) 53'	(substituted off) 90+1'
CF	9	(Brazil) Rodrigo Rodrigues		(substituted off) 61'
Substitutions:
MF	10	(Brazil) Yan Sasse	(yellow card) 64'	(substituted on) 61'
FW	19	(Tunisia) Achref Jabri		(substituted on) 61'
MF	4	(Tunisia) Mohamed Wael Derbali		(substituted on) 76'
DF	6	(Tunisia) Hamza Jelassi		(substituted on) 90+1'
Manager:
(Tunisia) Maher Kanzari

Man of the Match:
Youcef Belaïli (Espérance de Tunis)

Assistant referees:
Jan Erik Engan (Norway)
Isaak Bashevkin (Norway)
Fourth official:
Jean-Jacques Ndala (DR Congo)
Video assistant referee:
Tomasz Kwiatkowski (Poland)
Assistant video assistant referee:
Bram Van Driessche (Belgium)
Support video assistant referee:
Mohammed Obaid Khadim (United Arab Emirates)

=== Los Angeles FC vs Flamengo ===
June 24, 2025
9:00 pm EDT

Los Angeles FC (United States)	1–1	(Brazil) Flamengo
Bouanga 84'	Report	Wallace Yan 86'

Camping World Stadium, Orlando
Attendance: 32,933
Referee: Salman Falahi (Qatar)

Los Angeles FC	Flamengo

GK	1	(France) Hugo Lloris
CB	5	(Brazil) Marlon		(substituted off) 46'
CB	33	(United States) Aaron Long (c)
CB	4	(Colombia) Eddie Segura
RM	14	(Spain) Sergi Palencia
CM	6	(Brazil) Igor Jesus	(yellow card) 45+4'
CM	8	(United States) Mark Delgado	(yellow card) 75'	(substituted off) 89'
LM	24	(United States) Ryan Hollingshead
RF	26	(Netherlands) Javairô Dilrosun		(substituted off) 61'
CF	99	(Gabon) Denis Bouanga
LF	30	(Venezuela) David Martínez		(substituted off) 70'
Substitutions:
DF	29	(Ukraine) Artem Smolyakov		(substituted on) 46'
FW	9	(France) Olivier Giroud		(substituted on) 61'
MF	11	(United States) Timothy Tillman		(substituted on) 70'
MF	23	(United States) Frankie Amaya		(substituted on) 89'
Manager:
(United States) Steve Cherundolo

GK	1	(Argentina) Agustín Rossi
RB	2	(Uruguay) Guillermo Varela
CB	3	(Brazil) Léo Ortiz
CB	13	(Brazil) Danilo
LB	26	(Brazil) Alex Sandro	(substituted off) 82'
CM	52	(Brazil) Evertton Araújo	(substituted off) 82'
CM	29	(Brazil) Allan
RW	7	(Brazil) Luiz Araújo	(substituted off) 71'
AM	10	(Uruguay) Giorgian de Arrascaeta (c)	(substituted off) 71'
LW	11	(Brazil) Everton	(substituted off) 59'
CF	9	(Brazil) Pedro	(substituted off) 82'
Substitutions:
FW	30	(Brazil) Michael	(substituted on) 59'
FW	27	(Brazil) Bruno Henrique	(substituted on) 71'
FW	64	(Brazil) Wallace Yan	(substituted on) 71'
DF	17	(Uruguay) Matías Viña	(substituted on) 82'
MF	21	(Italy) Jorginho	(substituted on) 82'
FW	23	(Brazil) Juninho	(substituted on) 82'
Manager:
(Brazil) Filipe Luís

Man of the Match:
Giorgian de Arrascaeta (Flamengo)

Assistant referees:
Ramzan Al-Naemi (Qatar)
Majid Al-Shammari (Qatar)
Fourth official:
Juan Gabriel Benítez (Paraguay)
Video assistant referee:
Mohammed Obaid Khadim (United Arab Emirates)
Assistant video assistant referee:
Khamis Al-Marri (Qatar)
Support video assistant referee:
Tomasz Kwiatkowski (Poland)

=== Espérance de Tunis vs Chelsea ===
June 24, 2025
9:00 pm EDT

Espérance de Tunis (Tunisia)	0–3	(England) Chelsea
	Report	Adarabioyo 45+3'; Delap 45+5'; George 90+7'

Lincoln Financial Field, Philadelphia
Attendance: 32,967
Referee: Yael Falcón (Argentina)

Espérance de Tunis	Chelsea

GK	32	(Tunisia) Bechir Ben Saïd
RB	2	(Tunisia) Mohamed Ben Ali	(yellow card) 90+6'
CB	5	(Tunisia) Yassine Meriah (c)
CB	15	(Algeria) Mohamed Amine Tougai
LB	20	(Tunisia) Mohamed Amine Ben Hamida
CM	38	(Tunisia) Khalil Guenichi		(substituted off) 72'
CM	14	(Nigeria) Onuche Ogbelu	(yellow card) 90+2'
RW	24	(South Africa) Elias Mokwana		(substituted off) 46'
AM	10	(Brazil) Yan Sasse		(substituted off) 83'
LW	21	(Ivory Coast) Abdramane Konaté		(substituted off) 83'
CF	19	(Tunisia) Achref Jabri		(substituted off) 56'
Substitutions:
MF	4	(Tunisia) Mohamed Wael Derbali	(yellow card) 87'	(substituted on) 46'
FW	9	(Brazil) Rodrigo Rodrigues		(substituted on) 56'
DF	13	(Tunisia) Raed Bouchniba		(substituted on) 72'
MF	8	(Tunisia) Houssem Tka		(substituted on) 83'
FW	36	(Tunisia) Chiheb Jebali		(substituted on) 83'
Manager:
(Tunisia) Maher Kanzari			(yellow card) 46'

GK	12	(Denmark) Filip Jörgensen
RB	34	(England) Josh Acheampong
CB	4	(England) Tosin Adarabioyo
CB	5	(France) Benoît Badiashile
LB	27	(France) Malo Gusto	(substituted off) 82'
DM	45	(Belgium) Roméo Lavia	(substituted off) 59'
CM	18	(France) Christopher Nkunku
CM	8	(Argentina) Enzo Fernández (c)	(substituted off) 67'
RF	22	(England) Kiernan Dewsbury-Hall
CF	9	(England) Liam Delap	(substituted off) 59'
LF	11	(England) Noni Madueke	(substituted off) 67'
Substitutions:
FW	38	(Spain) Marc Guiu	(substituted on) 59'
MF	14	(Portugal) Dário Essugo	(substituted on) 59'
FW	32	(England) Tyrique George	(substituted on) 67'
MF	17	(Brazil) Andrey Santos	(substituted on) 67'
DF	19	(France) Mamadou Sarr	(substituted on) 82'
Manager:
(Italy) Enzo Maresca

Man of the Match:
Tosin Adarabioyo (Chelsea)

Assistant referees:
Maximiliano Del Yesso (Argentina)
Facundo Rodríguez (Argentina)
Fourth official:
Ma Ning (China)
Video assistant referee:
Nicolás Gallo (Colombia)
Assistant video assistant referee:
Hernán Mastrángelo (Argentina)
Support video assistant referee:
Carlos del Cerro Grande (Spain)

== Discipline ==
Fair play points would have been used as tiebreakers if the overall and head-to-head records of teams were tied. These were calculated based on yellow and red cards received in all group matches as follows:

- first yellow card: −1 point;
- indirect red card (second yellow card): −3 points;
- direct red card: −4 points;
- yellow card and direct red card: −5 points;

Only one of the above deductions was applied to a player in a single match.

Team	Match 1				Match 2				Match 3				Points
Team	Booked	(yellow card) (yellow-red card)	Sent off (straight red)	(yellow card) (red card)	Booked	(yellow card) (yellow-red card)	Sent off (straight red)	(yellow card) (red card)	Booked	(yellow card) (yellow-red card)	Sent off (straight red)	(yellow card) (red card)	Points
(Brazil) Flamengo	1				3								–4
(United States) Los Angeles FC	2				1				2				–5
(England) Chelsea	3				3		1						–10
(Tunisia) Espérance de Tunis	4				2				4				–10
