= 2025–26 Tunisian Cup =

Tournament details
- Country: Tunisia

Final positions
- Champions: Espérance de Tunis (17th title)
- Runners-up: ES Zarzis

Tournament statistics
- Matches played: 31
- Goals scored: 91 (2.94 per match)
- Top goal scorer(s): Khaled Boussaidi; Fedi Derguech; Achref Jabri; Hamza Mansri; Chadi Mehamedi (3 goals each)
- (Note: All statistics start from the round of 32)

2025–26 Tunisian Cup was the 94th season of the football cup competition of Tunisia. The competition was organized by the Tunisian Football Federation and open to all clubs in Tunisia.

== Schedule ==
Schedule for 2025–26 Tunisian Cup
Round	Draw date	Dates
Round of 32	27 February 2026	22–23 & 28 March 2026
Round of 16	29 March 2026	18–19 April & 17 May 2026
Quarter-finals	23 April 2026	20–21 May 2026
Semi-finals	23 April 2026	24 May 2026
Final	25 May 2026	31 May 2026

== Round of 32 ==
The draw for the round of 32 was held on 27 February 2026.

22 March 2026	JS Kairouan (1)	0–1 (a.e.t.)	CS Sfaxien (1)	Kairouan
13:30		Report	Maâloul 120+2' (pen.)	Stadium: Hamda Laouani Stadium; Referee: Sofien Ouertani

22 March 2026	OS Kebili (3)	0–1	JS El Omrane (1)	Kebili
13:30		Report		Stadium: Kebili Artificial Stadium; Referee: Akrem Neili

22 March 2026	PS Sakiet Eddaïer (2)	6–0	FS Sahline (3)	Sakiet Eddaïer
13:30	Rebaii 7'; Jihinaoui 40'; Derguech 50', 54'; Ben Ameur 77'; Sellami 90'	Report		Stadium: Sakiet Eddaïer Municipal Stadium; Referee: Samir Ounalli

22 March 2026	ES Métlaoui (1)	5–2 (a.e.t.)	AS Gabès (1)	Métlaoui
13:30	Mansri 51', 71', 95'; Bodian 113' (pen.); Nana 120'	Report	Bidani 16'; Agdavain 41'	Stadium: Métlaoui Municipal Stadium; Referee: Fedi Boukhris

22 March 2026	Jendouba Sport (2)	2–0	Sfax RS (2)	Jendouba
13:30	Mehamedi 29', 85'	Report		Stadium: Jendouba Municipal Stadium; Referee: Hamza Msilini

22 March 2026	CS M'saken (2)	4–1	US Ben Guerdane (1)	M'saken
13:30	Mejri 16', 83'; Zorgati 81'; Bouzidi 87'	Report	Abcha 50'	Stadium: M'saken Rugby Stadium; Referee: Walid Hedhli

22 March 2026	AS Soliman (1)	2–2 (a.e.t.) (4–1 p)	Stade Tunisien (1)	Tunis
13:30	Bouassida 30'; Mehri 32'	Report	Dhaflaoui 64'; Saafi 69'	Stadium: Le Kram Municipal Stadium; Referee: Raed Jouirou
	Penalties
	Penalty scored		Penalty missed Penalty scored

22 March 2026	US Monastir (1)	1–0	Club Africain (1)	Monastir
13:30	Bouchniba 7'	Report		Stadium: Mustapha Ben Jannet Stadium; Referee: Haithem Trabelsi

22 March 2026	CA Bizertin (1)	2–2 (a.e.t.) (5–4 p)	AS Marsa (1)	Bizerte
13:30	Ayinde 82', 112'	Report	Adejoh 5'; Dao 97'	Stadium: 15 October Stadium; Referee: Ridha Chouihi
	Penalties
	Penalty missed Penalty scored		Penalty scored Penalty missed

22 March 2026	FS Ksar Gafsa (4)	0–5	Étoile du Sahel (1)	El Ksar
13:30		Report	Dhaoui 17', 25'; Bouslama 21'; Abid 75'; Ben Amor 89'	Stadium: Ksar Gafsa Artificial Stadium; Referee: Wael Adjengui

22 March 2026	SS Mornag (4)	1–1 (a.e.t.) (3–5 p)	Olympique Béja (1)	Tunis
13:30	Hichri 120'	Report	Hasni 120+5'	Stadium: Mornag Artificial Stadium; Referee: Houssem Dhahri
	Penalties
	Penalty missed Penalty scored		Penalty scored

22 March 2026	ES Zarzis (1)	0–0 (a.e.t.) (4–3 p)	CS Korba (2)	Zarzis
13:30		Report		Stadium: Abdessalam Kazouz Stadium; Referee: Radhouane Belouer
	Penalties
	Penalty scored Penalty missed		Penalty scored Penalty missed

23 March 2026	BS Bou Hajla (2)	2–1 (a.e.t.)	US Ksour Essef (2)	Bou Hajla
13:30	Naghmouchi 19'; Mouelhi 111'	Report	Ben Turkia 41' (pen.)	Stadium: Bou Hajla Municipal Stadium; Referee: Houssem Boularesse

23 March 2026	US Djerba Ajim (3)	2–0	El Makarem de Mahdia (2)	Djerba
13:30	Bouhjar 5'; Gamoouna 37' (pen.)	Report		Stadium: Ajim Football Stadium; Referee: Ahmed Kilani

23 March 2026	AS Agareb (2)	1–4	Stade Gabèsien (2)	Agareb
13:30	Bahri 61'	Report	Khaoui 9'; Sassi 17'; Jabbari 29'; Boussaidi 76'	Stadium: Agareb Municipal Stadium; Attendance: 0 (close doors); Referee: Wael Mosbahi

28 March 2026	WS El Hamma (4)	0–5	Espérance de Tunis (1)	El Hamma
13:30		Report	Jabri 15', 26'; Hmidhi 51', 65'; Bouhouche 54' (o.g.)	Stadium: El Hamma Artificial Stadium; Referee: Amine Fkaier

== Round of 16 ==
The draw for the round of 16 was held on 29 March 2026.

18 April 2026	US Djerba Ajim (3)	0–2	JS El Omrane (1)	Djerba
14:00		Report	Khemissi 4'; Ben Hamida 72'	Stadium: Ajim Football Stadium; Referee: Ridha Chouihi

18 April 2026	PS Sakiet Eddaïer (2)	1–1 (a.e.t.) (4–2 p)	Olympique Béja (1)	Sakiet Eddaïer
14:00	Derguech 14'	Report	Omri 18'	Stadium: Sakiet Eddaïer Municipal Stadium; Referee: Fredj Abdellaoui
	Penalties
	Laajili (penalty scored); Ben Fajria (penalty scored); Rebaii (penalty scored); Aloui (penalty scored)		(penalty scored) Ben Rajeh; (penalty missed) Houiji; (penalty scored) Ragoubi; (penalty missed) Cherni

18 April 2026	BS Bou Hajla (2)	2–1 (a.e.t.)	AS Soliman (1)	Bou Hajla
14:00	Ounalli 13'; Mouelhi 117'	Report	Majhed 79' (pen.)	Stadium: Bou Hajla Municipal Stadium; Referee: Houssem Dhahri

19 April 2026	Stade Gabèsien (2)	4–3	Étoile du Sahel (1)	Gabès
14:00	Boussaidi 4', 53'; Kouraichi 72'; Zaghdoud 90+3'	Report	Hnid 11'; Bouslama 39'; Naouali 90+8'	Stadium: Gabès Municipal Stadium; Referee: Mehrez Melki

19 April 2026	CA Bizertin (1)	1–1 (a.e.t.) (4–3 p)	CS M'saken (2)	Bizerte
14:00	Amri 90+5'	Report	Kechiche 86'	Stadium: 15 October Stadium; Referee: Fedi Boukhris
	Penalties
	Kchouk (penalty scored); Doukali (penalty scored); Guesmi (penalty scored); Amri (penalty scored)		(penalty missed) Attia; (penalty scored) Mejri; (penalty scored) Kechiche; (penalty scored) Felhi; (penalty missed) Kacem

19 April 2026	US Monastir (1)	1–1 (a.e.t.) (1–3 p)	ES Zarzis (1)	Monastir
14:00	Chikhaoui 104'	Report	Ben Dhiaf 107'	Stadium: Mustapha Ben Jannet Stadium; Referee: Nidhal Letaief
	Penalties
	Barhoumi (penalty missed); Ben Youssef (penalty missed); Herch (penalty scored)		(penalty scored) Ghouma; (penalty missed) Ben Dhiaf; (penalty scored) Kassab; (penalty scored) Rjili

19 April 2026	CS Sfaxien (1)	2–1	Jendouba Sport (2)	Sfax
14:00	Habchia 17'; Derbali 27'	Report	Mehamedi 4'	Stadium: Taieb Mhiri Stadium; Referee: Walid Hedhli

17 May 2026	ES Métlaoui (1)	1–3	Espérance de Tunis (1)	Métlaoui
15:30	Fedaa 68'	Report	Tka 1'; Jabri 58'; Boualia 60'	Stadium: Métlaoui Municipal Stadium; Referee: Sadok Selmi

== Quarter-finals ==
The draw for the quarter-finals was held on 23 April 2026.

20 May 2026	CS Sfaxien (1)	2–1 (a.e.t.)	Stade Gabèsien (2)	Sfax
15:30	Mathlouthi 53'; Derbali 95'	Report	Tangour 66' (pen.)	Stadium: Taieb Mhiri Stadium; Referee: Khaled Gouider

20 May 2026	ES Zarzis (1)	2–0	CA Bizertin (1)	Zarzis
15:30	Ben Dhiaf 4'; Rahmani 75'	Report		Stadium: Abdessalam Kazouz Stadium; Referee: Amir Loussif

21 May 2026	PS Sakiet Eddaïer (2)	1–1 (a.e.t.) (3–4 p)	JS El Omrane (1)	Sakiet Eddaïer
15:30	Bouraoui 37'	Report	Marouani 18'	Stadium: Sakiet Eddaïer Municipal Stadium; Referee: Seif Ouertani
	Penalties
	Ben Fajria (penalty missed); Laajili (penalty missed); Rebaii (penalty scored); Derguech (penalty scored); Ben Ameur (penalty scored)		(penalty scored) Zoghlami; (penalty missed) Jouini; (penalty scored) Kouki; (penalty scored) Zouaghi; (penalty scored) Belhaj

21 May 2026	BS Bou Hajla (2)	0–3	Espérance de Tunis (1)	Bou Hajla
15:30		Report	Ben Ali 38'; Dhaou 86'; Touati 90+3'	Stadium: Bou Hajla Municipal Stadium; Referee: Nidhal Letaief

== Semi-finals ==
The draw for the semi-finals was held on 23 April 2026 (after the quarter-finals draw). All the teams that qualified for this round were from the 1st tier.

24 May 2026
15:30

CS Sfaxien	0–1	ES Zarzis
	Report	Kassab 39'

Taieb Mhiri Stadium, Sfax
Referee: Walid Mansri

24 May 2026
15:30

JS El Omrane	0–1	Espérance de Tunis
	Report	Danho 31'

Chedly Zouiten Stadium, Tunis
Referee: Hosni Neili

== Final ==
The final was played on 31 May 2026 at Hammadi Agrebi Stadium, Tunis.

31 May 2026
16:00

ES Zarzis	0–1	Espérance de Tunis
	Report	Rafia 62'

Hammadi Agrebi Stadium, Tunis
Attendance: 26,000
Referee: Nidhal Letaief

ES Zarzis	Espérance de Tunis

GK	22	(Tunisia) Seifeddine Charfi		(substituted off) 68'
DF	20	(Senegal) Pape Mamour Diallo	(yellow card) 45+1'
DF	28	(Tunisia) Lamjed Rjili (c)		(substituted off) 69'
DF	33	(Tunisia) Ghassen Mahersi	(yellow card) 87'
DF	35	(Tunisia) Firas Ghouma
MF	6	(Tunisia) Kouni Khalfa
MF	13	(Tunisia) Khalil Kassab
MF	17	(Cameroon) David Nyengue		(substituted off) 18'
FW	7	(Tunisia) Achref Ben Dhiaf
FW	18	(Tunisia) Yosri Dhiflaoui		(substituted off) 18'
FW	29	(Tunisia) Moemen Rahmani
Substitutes:
GK	32	(Tunisia) Hamza Ghanmi	(red card) 90+10'	(substituted on) 68'
DF	3	(Tunisia) Yassine Laariadh
DF	12	(Tunisia) Jassem Belkilani		(substituted on) 69'
MF	14	(Nigeria) Yakubu Sadik Abubakar
MF	24	(Tunisia) Mohamed Mokhtar Zidi
MF	27	(Tunisia) Amir Tajouri		(substituted on) 18'
FW	10	(Tunisia) Mohamed Hedi Jertila		(substituted on) 82'
FW	11	(Tunisia) Adem Garreb
FW	15	(Nigeria) Adepoju Oluwaseun		(substituted on) 18' (substituted off) 82'
Manager:
(Tunisia) Moncef Mcharek

GK	1	(Tunisia) Amenallah Memmiche
DF	2	(Tunisia) Mohamed Ben Ali	(yellow card) 89'
DF	5	(Tunisia) Yassine Meriah (c)
DF	6	(Tunisia) Hamza Jelassi	(yellow card) 86'
DF	12	(Tunisia) Nidhal Laifi	(yellow card) 72'
MF	8	(Tunisia) Houssem Tka		(substituted off) 58'
MF	21	(Ivory Coast) Abdramane Konaté	(yellow card) 41'	(substituted off) 58'
MF	24	(Tunisia) Hamza Rafia
FW	7	(Algeria) Kouceila Boualia		(substituted off) 58'
FW	22	(France) Florian Danho
FW	34	(Burkina Faso) Jack Diarra		(substituted off) 74'
Substitutes:
GK	26	(Tunisia) Mohamed Sedki Debchi
DF	13	(Tunisia) Ala Derbali
MF	10	(Brazil) Yan Sasse		(substituted on) 58'
MF	14	(Nigeria) Onuche Ogbelu		(substituted on) 58'
MF	17	(Tunisia) Haytham Dhaou		(substituted on) 74'
MF	18	(Tunisia) Moez Hadj Ali
MF	27	(Tunisia) Khalil Guenichi
MF	31	(Tunisia) Chiheb Jebali	(yellow card) 87'	(substituted on) 58'
FW	19	(Tunisia) Achref Jabri
Manager:
(France) Christian Bracconi

Assistant referees:
Khalil Hassani
Ahmed Dhouioui
Fourth official:
Seif Ouertani
Reserve referee:
Amenallah Hajri
Video assistant referee:
Majdi Bellagha
Assistant video assistant referees:
Hosni Neili
Omar Bridaa

Match rules
- 90 minutes
- 30 minutes of extra time if necessary
- Penalty shoot-out if scores still level
- Nine named substitutes
- Maximum of five substitutions, with a sixth allowed in extra time

== See also ==
- 2025–26 Tunisian Ligue Professionnelle 1
- 2025–26 Tunisian Super Cup
