= Bechir Ben Saïd =

Tunisian footballer

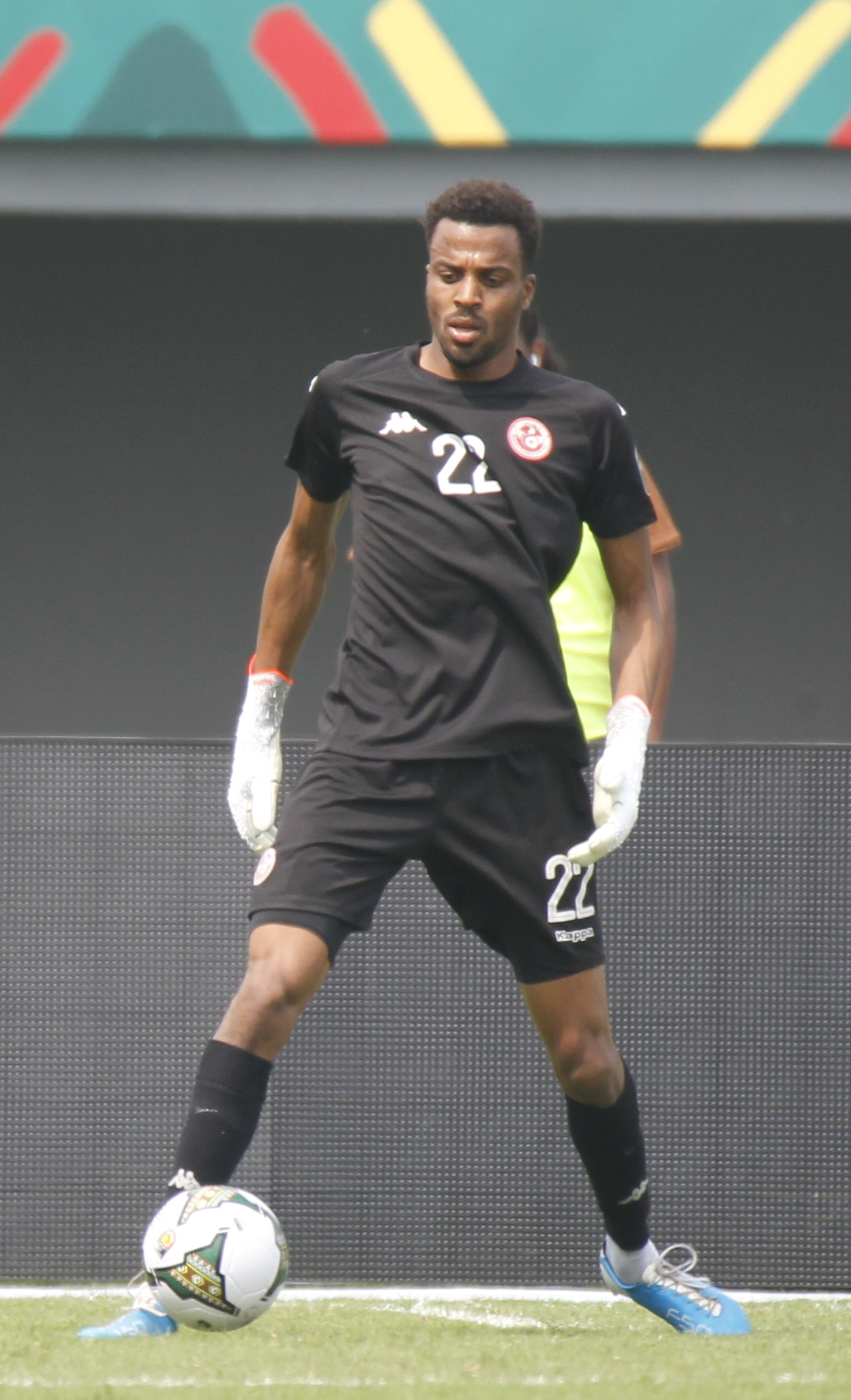
- Ben Saïd in 2022

Personal information
- Full name: Bechir Ben Saïd
- Date of birth: 29 November 1992 (age 33)
- Place of birth: Gabès, Tunisia
- Height: 1.93 m (6 ft 4 in)
- Position: Goalkeeper

Team information
- Current team: Espérance de Tunis
- Number: 32

Senior career*
Years	Team	Apps	(Gls)
2014–2018	AS Gabès	15	(0)
2018–2024	US Monastir	119	(0)
2024–	Espérance de Tunis	31	(0)

International career^{‡}
2022–	Tunisia	21	(0)
Medal record
Representing Tunisia
Men's football
FIFA Arab Cup
Runner-up	2021 Qatar
- * Club domestic league appearances and goals as of 22 November 2026 ‡ National team caps and goals as of 9 June 2024

Bechir Ben Saïd (Arabic: بَشِير بْن سَعِيد; born 29 November 1992) is a Tunisian professional footballer who plays as a goalkeeper for Tunisian Ligue Professionnelle 1 club Espérance de Tunis and the Tunisia national team.

== Club career ==
In June 2025, Ben Saïd was included in Espérance de Tunis squad for the 2025 FIFA Club World Cup. In the match against Los Angeles FC, Ben Saïd produced a number of saves, including a last minute penalty save from Denis Bouanga, as the club won 1-0.

== International career ==
At the end of 2021, when he had never played for the Tunisian team, Ben Saïd was selected to participate in the 2021 FIFA Arab Cup organized in Qatar. During this competition, he officiates as a substitute goalkeeper and does not play any matches. Tunisia lost in the final against Algeria.

He was later named into the Tunisian squad yet again for the 2021 Africa Cup of Nations in Cameroon, with initial expectation to be a substitute goalkeeper, he ended up being the main keeper of Tunisia throughout the group stage as Tunisia had a somewhat disappointing performance, only qualified as one of the best third-placed team with one lone win.

== Career statistics ==
=== Club ===
As of 22 November 2026

Appearances and goals by club, season and competition
Club	Season	League			National Cup		Continental		Other		Total	
Club	Season	Division	Apps	Goals	Apps	Goals	Apps	Goals	Apps	Goals	Apps	Goals
AS Gabès	2014–15	Tunisian Ligue Professionnelle 1	3	0	0	0	—		—		3	0
AS Gabès	2015–16	Tunisian Ligue Professionnelle 2	0	0	0	0	—		—		0	0
AS Gabès	2016–17	Tunisian Ligue Professionnelle 1	7	0	0	0	—		—		7	0
AS Gabès	2017–18	Tunisian Ligue Professionnelle 1	5	0	3	0	—		—		8	0
AS Gabès	Total		15	0	3	0	—		—		18	0
US Monastir	2018–19	Tunisian Ligue Professionnelle 1	4	0	1	0	—		—		5	0
US Monastir	2019–20	Tunisian Ligue Professionnelle 1	25	0	5	0	—		—		30	0
US Monastir	2020–21	Tunisian Ligue Professionnelle 1	25	0	4	0	6 (Note: Appearances in CAF Confederation Cup)	0	—		35	0
US Monastir	2021–22	Tunisian Ligue Professionnelle 1	23	0	0	0	—		1 (Note: Appearance in Tunisian Super Cup)	0	24	0
US Monastir	2022–23	Tunisian Ligue Professionnelle 1	22	0	0	0	11 (Note: Four appearances in CAF Champions League, seven appearances in CAF Confederation Cup)	0	—		33	0
US Monastir	2023–24	Tunisian Ligue Professionnelle 1	20	0	3	0	—		—		23	0
US Monastir	Total		119	0	13	0	17	0	1	0	150	0
Espérance de Tunis	2024–25	Tunisian Ligue Professionnelle 1	6	0	3	0	5 (Note: Appearances in CAF Champions League)	0	3 (Note: Appearances in FIFA Club World Cup)	0	17	0
Espérance de Tunis	2025–26	Tunisian Ligue Professionnelle 1	21	0	0	0	13	0	0	0	34	0
Espérance de Tunis	2026–27	Tunisian Ligue Professionnelle 1	4	0	0	0	2	0	0	0	6	0
Espérance de Tunis	Total		31	0	3	0	20	0	3	0	57	0
Career total			165	0	19	0	37	0	4	0	225	0

=== International ===
As of 9 June 2024

Appearances and goals by national team and year
National team	Year	Apps	Goals
Tunisia	2022	10	0
Tunisia	2023	2	0
Tunisia	2024	9	0
Total		21	0

== Honours ==
US Monastir

- Tunisian Cup: 2019–20
- Tunisian Super Cup: 2020

Espérance de Tunis

- Tunisian Super Cup: 2024, 2025
- Tunisian Ligue Professionnelle 1: 2024–25
- Tunisian Cup: 2024–25, 2025–26

Tunisia

- FIFA Arab Cup runner up: 2021
- Kirin Cup Soccer: 2022
