= Wael Derbali =

Tunisian footballer (born 2003)

Personal information
- Full name: Mohamed Wael Derbali
- Date of birth: 18 June 2003 (age 23)
- Place of birth: Toulouse, France
- Height: 1.89 m (6 ft 2 in)
- Position: Midfielder

Team information
- Current team: Brommapojkarna

Youth career
- Toulouse
- 2019–2021: Espérance de Tunis

Senior career*
Years	Team	Apps	(Gls)
2021–2023	Olympique Béja	32	(0)
2023–2026	Espérance de Tunis	28	(1)
2026–	Brommapojkarna	7	(0)

International career^{‡}
2022–2023	Tunisia U20	13	(0)
2023–	Tunisia	1	(0)
- * Club domestic league appearances and goals as of 6 November 2025 ‡ National team caps and goals as of 17 June 2023

Mohamed Wael Derbali (Arabic: محمد وائل الدربالي; born 18 June 2003) is a professional footballer who plays as a midfielder for Allsvenskan club Brommapojkarna. Born in France, he plays for the Tunisia national team.

== Club career ==
=== Early career ===
Derbali joined the youth setup of Espérance de Tunis in 2019 from French club Toulouse, where he spent two years before joining Olympique Béja in 2021.

=== Olympique Béja ===
In 2021, Derbali joined Olympique Béja, where he shone in the 2022–23 season, and received interest from several teams from Tunisia and from outside Tunisia.

=== Espérance de Tunis ===
On 17 August 2023, Derbali joined Espérance de Tunis signing a three-year contract.

== International career ==
Derbali participated with the Tunisia U20 in the 2023 U-20 Africa Cup of Nations and the 2023 FIFA U-20 World Cup.

Derbali's success with his club and the Tunisia national youth team led him to the Tunisia national team for the first time by the coach Jalel Kadri on 17 June 2023 against Equatorial Guinea in the 2023 Africa Cup of Nations qualification, replacing the injured Firas Ben Larbi in the list.

== Career statistics ==
=== Club ===
As of 6 November 2025

Appearances and goals by club, season and competition
Club	Season	League			National cup (Note: Includes Tunisian Cup and Svenska Cupen)		Continental		Other		Total	
Club	Season	Division	Apps	Goals	Apps	Goals	Apps	Goals	Apps	Goals	Apps	Goals
Olympique Béja	2021–22	Tunisian Ligue Professionnelle 1	12	0	0	0	—		—		12	0
Olympique Béja	2022–23	Tunisian Ligue Professionnelle 1	20	0	1	0	—		—		21	0
Olympique Béja	Total		32	0	1	0	—		—		33	0
Espérance de Tunis	2023–24	Tunisian Ligue Professionnelle 1	16	1	1	0	6 (Note: Four appearances in CAF Champions League, two appearances in African Football League)	0	—		23	1
Espérance de Tunis	2024–25	Tunisian Ligue Professionnelle 1	11	0	5	2	1 (Note: Appearance in CAF Champions League)	1	3 (Note: Appearances in FIFA Club World Cup)	0	20	3
Espérance de Tunis	2025–26	Tunisian Ligue Professionnelle 1	1	0	0	0	1	0	1 (Note: Appearance in Tunisian Super Cup)	0	3	0
Espérance de Tunis	Total		28	1	6	2	8	1	4	0	46	4
Brommapojkarna	2026	Allsvenskan	7	0	0	0	—		—		0	0
Career total			67	1	7	2	8	1	4	0	79	4

=== International ===
As of 17 June 2023

Appearances and goals by national team and year
National team	Year	Apps	Goals
Tunisia U20	2022	3	0
Tunisia U20	2023	10	0
Tunisia U20	Total	13	0
Tunisia	2023	1	0
Career total		14	0

== Honours ==
Olympique Béja

- Tunisian Cup: 2022–23

Espérance de Tunis

- Tunisian Ligue Professionnelle 1: 2023–24, 2024–25
- Tunisian Super Cup: 2024, 2025
- Tunisian Cup: 2024–25, 2025–26
