= Yassine Meriah =

Tunisian footballer (born 1993)

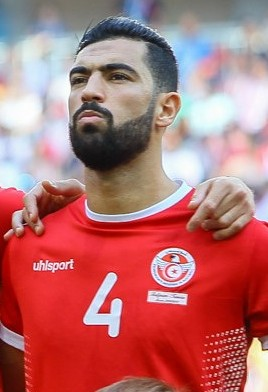
- Meriah lining up with Tunisia at the 2018 FIFA World Cup

Personal information
- Full name: Yassine Meriah
- Date of birth: 2 July 1993 (age 33)
- Place of birth: Ariana, Tunisia
- Height: 1.88 m (6 ft 2 in)
- Position: Centre-back

Youth career
- AS Ariana

Senior career*
Years	Team	Apps	(Gls)
2013–2015	ES Métlaoui	27	(0)
2015–2018	CS Sfaxien	81	(6)
2018–2021	Olympiacos	23	(1)
2020	→ Kasımpaşa (loan)	15	(0)
2020–2021	→ Çaykur Rizespor (loan)	28	(1)
2021–2022	Al Ain	10	(1)
2022–2026	Espérance de Tunis	67	(11)
2026	Club Africain	2	(0)

International career
2015–2026	Tunisia	95	(6)
Medal record
Men's football
Representing Tunisia
FIFA Arab Cup
Runner-up	2021 Qatar
- * Club domestic league appearances and goals

Yassine Meriah (Arabic: ياسين مرياح; born 2 July 1993) is a Tunisian former professional footballer who played as a centre-back.

== Club career ==
Mariah was formed in AS Ariana, the team that was active in the Tunisian Ligue Professionnelle 2. In the 2013–14 season, he was transferred to ES Métlaoui when he was 20 years old. After spending two seasons with the team, he was prominently featured and invited to the Tunisian Olympic team. He attracted the attention of the officials of CS Sfaxien, one of the most important teams in the Tunisian Ligue Professionnelle 1 who sought to sign with him, starting from the 2014–15 season. From his first season with CS Sfaxien, Meriah was a key figure in the squad and played in many of the team's defensive positions.

=== Olympiacos ===
On 28 July 2018, Meriah joined Olympiacos for an estimated transfer fee of €1,500,000, signing a four-year contract. On 2 September 2018, he scored his first goal for the club in a 5–0 home win against PAS Giannina.

On 31 January 2020, Meriah officially loaned in Süper Lig club Kasımpaşa, until the end of the 2019–20 season, with a €5 million buyout clause expected in the summer. Meriah started this year as de facto leader in Olympiakos defence, having a great presence in the Champions League qualifiers. Later, however, there were some games in which he made mistakes, so he was sidelined. On 13 September 2020, he signed a long season loan with another Süper Lig club Çaykur Rizespor.

=== Al Ain ===
On 28 July 2021, Meriah joined Al Ain for a reported transfer fee of €2 million signing a two-year contract.

=== Espérance de Tunis ===
On 4 August 2022, Meriah joined Espérance de Tunis as a free agent signing a two-year contract.

== International career ==
Meriah's success with his club led him to the Tunisia national team for the first time by coach Georges Leekens on 13 June 2015 against Morocco in 2016 African Nations Championship qualification.

He scored his first goal against DR Congo in 2018 FIFA World Cup qualification.

In May 2018 he was named in Tunisia's final 23-man squad for the 2018 FIFA World Cup in Russia. In June 2019 he was named in Tunisia's final 23-man squad for the 2019 Africa Cup of Nations in Egypt.

== Career statistics ==
=== Club ===
Appearances and goals by club, season and competition
Club	Season	League			Cup		Continental		Other		Total	
Club	Season	Division	Apps	Goals	Apps	Goals	Apps	Goals	Apps	Goals	Apps	Goals
ES Métlaoui	2013–14	Tunisian Ligue Professionnelle 1	13	0	0	0	—		—		13	0
ES Métlaoui	2014–15	Tunisian Ligue Professionnelle 1	14	0	1	0	—		—		15	0
ES Métlaoui	Total		27	0	1	0	—		—		28	0
CS Sfaxien	2014–15	Tunisian Ligue Professionnelle 1	9	2	2	0	0	0	—		11	2
CS Sfaxien	2015–16	Tunisian Ligue Professionnelle 1	27	0	0	0	—		—		27	0
CS Sfaxien	2016–17	Tunisian Ligue Professionnelle 1	23	3	1	0	8 (Note: Appearances in CAF Confederation Cup)	0	—		32	3
CS Sfaxien	2017–18	Tunisian Ligue Professionnelle 1	22	1	3	0	—		—		25	1
CS Sfaxien	Total		81	6	6	0	8	0	—		95	6
Olympiacos	2018–19	Super League Greece	18	1	4	0	4 (Note: Appearances in UEFA Europa League)	0	—		26	1
Olympiacos	2019–20	Super League Greece	5	0	2	0	11 (Note: Appearances in UEFA Champions League)	0	—		18	0
Olympiacos	Total		23	1	6	0	15	0	—		44	1
Kasımpaşa (loan)	2019–20	Süper Lig	15	0	0	0	—		—		15	0
Rizespor (loan)	2020–21	Süper Lig	26	1	0	0	—		—		26	1
Al Ain	2021–22	UAE Pro League	10	1	1	0	0	0	—		11	1
Espérance de Tunis	2022–23	Tunisian Ligue Professionnelle 1	23	3	4	0	12 (Note: Appearances in CAF Champions League)	0	—		39	3
Espérance de Tunis	2023–24	Tunisian Ligue Professionnelle 1	20	5	1	1	18 (Note: Fourteen appearances and two goals in CAF Champions League, four appearances in African Football League)	2	3 (Note: Appearances in Arab Club Champions Cup)	0	42	8
Espérance de Tunis	2024–25	Tunisian Ligue Professionnelle 1	9	2	1	0	3	1	3 (Note: Appearances in FIFA Club World Cup)	0	16	3
Espérance de Tunis	2025–26	Tunisian Ligue Professionnelle 1	13	1	4	0	6	1	1 (Note: Appearance in Tunisian Super Cup)	0	24	2
Espérance de Tunis	Total		67	11	10	1	39	4	7	0	123	16
Club Africain	2026–27	Tunisian Ligue Professionnelle 1	2	0	—		0	0	—		2	0
Career total			251	20	24	1	62	7	7	0	344	25

=== International ===
Appearances and goals by national team and year
National team	Year	Apps	Goals
Tunisia	2015	3	0
Tunisia	2016	3	0
Tunisia	2017	7	1
Tunisia	2018	13	1
Tunisia	2019	17	1
Tunisia	2020	4	0
Tunisia	2021	14	0
Tunisia	2022	4	0
Tunisia	2023	10	1
Tunisia	2024	13	1
Tunisia	2025	7	1
Tunisia	2026	1	0
Total		95	6

Scores and results list Tunisia's goal tally first, score column indicates score after each Meriah goal.

List of international goals scored by Yassine Meriah
No.	Date	Venue	Opponent	Score	Result	Competition
1	1 September 2017	Hammadi Agrebi Stadium, Tunis, Tunisia	DR Congo	1–0	2–1	2018 FIFA World Cup qualification
2	13 October 2018	Hammadi Agrebi Stadium, Tunis, Tunisia	Niger	1–0	1–0	2019 Africa Cup of Nations qualification
3	22 March 2019	Hammadi Agrebi Stadium, Tunis, Tunisia	Eswatini	4–0	4–0	2019 Africa Cup of Nations qualification
4	17 November 2023	Hammadi Agrebi Stadium, Tunis, Tunisia	São Tomé and Príncipe	1–0	4–0	2026 FIFA World Cup qualification
5	15 October 2024	Felix Houphouet Boigny Stadium, Abidjan, Ivory Coast	Comoros	1–1	1–1	2025 Africa Cup of Nations qualification
6	7 December 2025	Al Bayt Stadium, Al Khor, Qatar	Qatar	2–0	3–0	2025 FIFA Arab Cup

== Honours ==
Olympiacos

- Greek Football Cup: 2019–20

Al Ain

- UAE Pro League: 2021–22
- UAE League Cup: 2021–22

Espérance de Tunis

- Tunisian Ligue Professionnelle 1: 2023–24, 2024–25
- Tunisian Super Cup: 2024, 2025
- Tunisian Cup: 2024–25, 2025–26

Tunisia

- FIFA Arab Cup runner-up: 2021
- Africa Cup of Nations fourth place: 2019

Individual

- Africa Cup of Nations Team of the Tournament: 2019
