= Taïeb Mhiri =

Tunisian politician

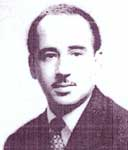
Taïeb Mhiri

Taïeb Mhiri (الطيب المهيري) (or Taïeb Mehiri) (25 July 1924 – 29 June 1965) was a Tunisian politician.

== Biography ==
Coming from a family of the Tunisian bourgeoisie attached to Destour, he first studied at Sadiki College. Having lost his father at a very young age, he was taken in by his grandfather. Known as a player in the Avenir Sportif de La Marsa football team, he lived in the Bab Souika district, in Bab Laqwas.

He served as the interior minister from 1956 until his death in 1965.

Mhiri oversaw the destruction of the Husainid Dynasty palace in La Marsa and other similar monuments.

He was buried in Jellaz Cemetery. The sports stadium, Stade Taïeb Mhiri in Sfax, is named after him, as well as the street, Avenue Taieb Mhiri, in Tunis.
