= Maher Kanzari =

Tunisian footballer and manager

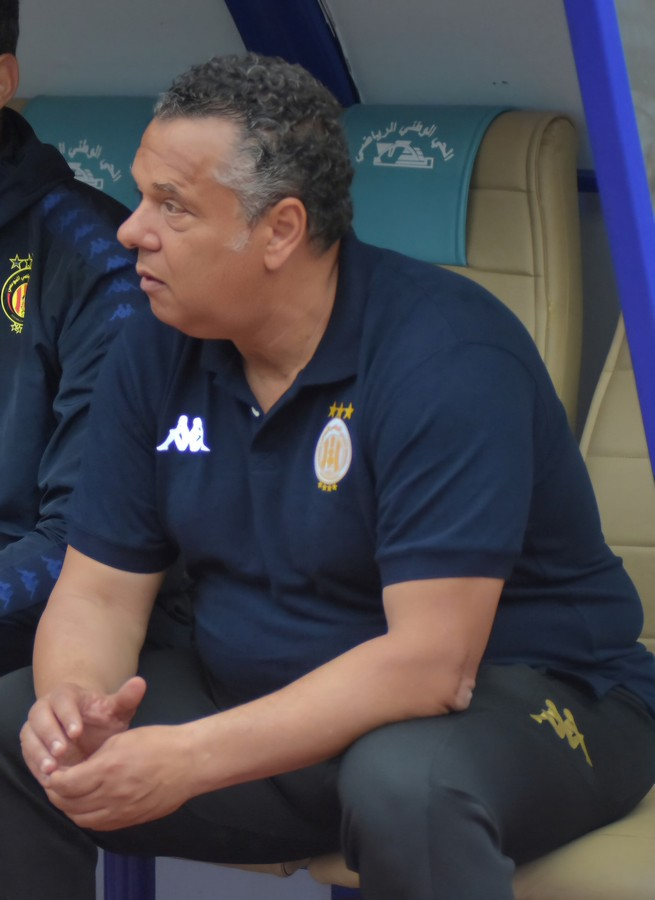
- Kanzari in 2025

Personal information
- Date of birth: 17 March 1973 (age 53)
- Place of birth: Tunis, Tunisia
- Height: 1.77 m (5 ft 10 in)
- Position: Attacking midfielder

Team information
- Current team: Club Africain (manager)

Senior career*
Years	Team	Apps	(Gls)
1990–1997	Stade Tunisien		
1997–2000	Espérance de Tunis		
2000–2001	Al Ahli Saudi	3	(2)
2001–2002	Al Nasr Dubai		
2002–2003	Dubai CSC		

International career
1996	Tunisia Olympics	3	(0)
1998–2002	Tunisia	31	(7)

Managerial career
- 2006–2007: Tunisia U17
- 2007–2010: Espérance de Tunis (assistant)
- 2010: Espérance de Tunis
- 2011–2012: CA Bizertin
- 2012–2013: Al-Sailiya
- 2013: Espérance de Tunis
- 2014: CA Bizertin
- 2014: Al-Wakrah
- 2014–2015: Tunisia (assistant)
- 2015: Tunisia U-23
- 2016: Stade Tunisien
- 2016–2017: CA Bizertin
- 2017: Stade Gabèsien
- 2018: Ohod Club
- 2018–2019: Tunisia (assistant)
- 2018: Tunisia (caretaker)
- 2020–2021: Tunisia U20
- 2021–2023: Tunisia U23
- 2023–2024: CA Bizertin
- 2024–2025: Stade Tunisien
- 2025–2026: Espérance de Tunis
- 2026-: Club Africain
- * Club domestic league appearances and goals

Maher Kanzari (born 17 March 1973) is a Tunisian professional football manager and former player. He played as an attacking midfielder and represented the Tunisia national football team.

== Club career ==
Kanzari played in the Tunisian Ligue Professionnelle 1 for Stade Tunisien and Espérance de Tunis. He also competed in the Saudi Professional League with Al-Ahli Saudi FC and in the UAE Pro League with Al Nasr Dubai and Dubai CSC.

== International career ==
Kanzari represented Tunisia at the 1996 Summer Olympics in Atlanta with the Olympic team. He made his senior debut in 1998, earning 31 caps and scoring 7 goals over four years. He also played in the 2000 African Cup of Nations, where Tunisia reached the semi-finals.

== Coaching career ==
Kanzari guided the Tunisia national under-17 football team to qualification for the 2007 FIFA U-17 World Cup in South Korea by reaching the semi-finals of the 2007 African U-17 Championship. He advanced the team to the round of 16, with victories over Belgium and the United States. This success led to his appointment as assistant coach at Espérance de Tunis in 2007.

Following Faouzi Benzarti's departure in 2010, Kanzari briefly served as head coach of Espérance de Tunis before Nabil Maâloul took over. On 2 January 2011, he was appointed coach of CA Bizertin, guiding them to second place in the 2011–12 Tunisian Ligue Professionnelle 1. In October 2012, he replaced Uli Stielike at Al-Sailiya SC.

In 2014, he served as assistant to Georges Leekens with the Tunisia national team. He had short spells with Stade Tunisien, CA Bizertin, and Stade Gabèsien (some ending in relegation threats or relegation), and managed Saudi club Ohod Club before dismissal for poor results.

In August 2018, he rejoined the Tunisia national team as assistant to Faouzi Benzarti. From 2020 to 2023, he coached Tunisia's U20 and U23 teams. He returned to club management with CA Bizertin (2023–2024) and Stade Tunisien (2024–2025).

In March 2025, Kanzari was appointed head coach of Espérance Sportive de Tunis. He led the club to the 2024–25 Tunisian Ligue Professionnelle 1, 2024–25 Tunisian Cup, and 2024–25 Tunisian Super Cup titles. He was dismissed in February 2026 following a defeat to Stade Malien in the CAF Champions League.

== Honours ==
=== Player ===
Espérance de Tunis

- Tunisian Ligue Professionnelle 1: 1998, 1999, 2000
- Tunisian Cup: 1999
- CAF Cup: 1997
- African Cup Winners' Cup: 1998

=== Manager ===
Espérance de Tunis

- Tunisian Ligue Professionnelle 1: 2024–25
- Tunisian Cup: 2024–25
- Tunisian Super Cup: 2025

Tunisia U20

- Fourth place, Africa U-20 Cup of Nations: 2021
