= Mohamed Ben Ali =

Tunisian association football player

Personal information
- Full name: Mohamed Ben Ali
- Date of birth: 16 February 1995 (age 31)
- Place of birth: Tunis, Tunisia
- Height: 1.76 m (5 ft 9 in)
- Position: Defender

Team information
- Current team: Espérance de Tunis
- Number: 2

Youth career
- Stade Tunisien

Senior career*
Years	Team	Apps	(Gls)
2013–2019	Stade Tunisien	93	(0)
2019–2022	CS Sfaxien	55	(0)
2022–	Espérance de Tunis	64	(0)

International career^{‡}
2014	Tunisia U20	2	(0)
2025–	Tunisia	4	(1)
- * Club domestic league appearances and goals as of 22 November 2026 ‡ National team caps and goals as of 3 January 2026

Mohamed Ben Ali (Arabic: محمد بن علي; born 16 February 1995) is a Tunisian footballer who plays as a defender for Tunisian Ligue Professionnelle 1 club Espérance de Tunis and the Tunisia national team.

== International goals ==
Scores and results list Tunisia goal tally first.

No	Date	Venue	Opponent	Score	Result	Competition
1.	7 December 2025	Al Bayt Stadium, Al Khor, Qatar	Qatar	3–0	3–0	2025 FIFA Arab Cup

== Honours ==
CS Sfaxien

- Tunisian Cup: 2018–19, 2020–21

Espérance de Tunis

- Tunisian Ligue Professionnelle 1: 2023–24, 2024–25
- Tunisian Super Cup: 2024, 2025
- Tunisian Cup: 2024–25, 2025–26
