= Ibrahima Keita (footballer) =

Mauritanian footballer (born 2001)

Personal information
- Date of birth: 8 November 2001 (age 25)
- Place of birth: Bamako, Mali
- Height: 1.81 m (5 ft 11 in)
- Position: Right-back

Youth career
- Académie Bamako
- Guidars FC

Senior career*
Years	Team	Apps	(Gls)
2021–2023	FC 93 Bobigny	4	(0)
2023–2025	TP Mazembe	35	(3)
2025–2026	Espérance de Tunis	16	(0)

International career^{‡}
2022–	Mauritania	32	(0)
- * Club domestic league appearances and goals as of 14 May 2026 ‡ National team caps and goals as of 16 June 2026

Ibrahima Keita (born 8 November 2001) is a professional footballer who plays as a right-back. Born in Mali, he plays for the Mauritania national team.

== Club career ==
Born in Bamako, Keita played for Guidars FC in Mali, FC Deuz Nouakchott in Mauritania and FC 93 Bobigny in France, making 4 league appearances for the latter. He joined FC Nouadhibou in March 2023, before in July 2023, Keita signed for Linafoot club TP Mazembe on a two-year contract.

On 15 July 2025, he joined Tunisian club Espérance de Tunis on a two-year contract.

== International career ==
Keita made his debut for Mauritania in March 2022 in a 2–1 friendly victory over Mozambique. Keita was named in Mauritania's squad for the 2023 Africa Cup of Nations.
