= Christian Bracconi =

French footballer (born 1960)

Personal information
- Date of birth: 25 November 1960 (age 65)
- Place of birth: Constantine, Algeria
- Height: 1.77 m (5 ft 10 in)
- Position: Forward

Team information
- Current team: Étoile Sportive du Sahel

Senior career*
Years	Team	Apps	(Gls)
1980–1983	Bastia	17	(3)
1983–1986	Racing Besançon	86	(20)
1986–1988	Metz	53	(3)
1988–1991	Bastia	47	(4)
Total		203	(30)

Managerial career
- 2013–2014: AC Ajaccio
- 2015: CA Bastia
- 2016–2017: Sochaux (assistant)
- 2017: Tubize (assistant)
- 2017–2019: Tubize
- 2019–2020: Virton
- 2021–2022: Saint-Éloi Lupopo
- 2022–2023: Virton
- 2023–2025: Marseille U19
- 2026: Espérance de Tunis (caretaker)
- 2026: Espérance de Tunis (assistant)
- 2026: Espérance de Tunis (caretaker)
- 2026-: Étoile Sportive du Sahel
- * Club domestic league appearances and goals

Christian Bracconi (born 25 November 1960) is a French-Italian football coach and a former player who played as a forward. He is the current caretaker manager of Tunisian Ligue Professionnelle 1 club Espérance de Tunis. During his playing days, Bracconi played for SC Bastia in Ligue 1 and Ligue 2.

== Playing career ==
Bracconi started his career in Ligue 1 with SC Bastia, whom he played for from 1980 to 1983. After spending three seasons with Bastia, Bracconi signed for Racing Besançon in Ligue 2. While at Besançon Bracconi enjoyed the best time of his career in which he scored 20 goals in his three seasons with the club in the second division. He then made the move back to Ligue 1 with FC Metz where he stayed for two seasons before moving back to Ligue 2 with former club SC Bastia. In 1991, after spending three seasons with Bastia, Bracconi retired from professional football.

== Coaching career ==
On 4 November 2013, after Ligue 1 club AC Ajaccio sacked Fabrizio Ravanelli, Bracconi was made interim manager of the club. His first match in charge was on 9 November 2013 against Toulouse in which his side took the lead early in the 7th minute through Paul Lasne before giving away the equaliser in the 42nd minute as the match ended 1–1. His first league victory as manager of the club eventually came on 8 February 2014 against Rennes in which his side won 3–1. In October 2014, Bracconi was dismissed.

On 13 June 2015, Bracconi was appointed as manager of Championnat National club CA Bastia. He was dismissed in November, with the club in last place. In May 2016, he became assistant to his former Metz teammate Albert Cartier at Sochaux, and left a year later at the end of his contract.

In November 2017, Bracconi moved abroad to Tubize in the Belgian First Division B, as assistant to Sadio Demba, and became manager days later. He suffered relegation in his first year but the club were reinstated due to the administrative relegation of Lierse, and his contract was renewed. He resigned in June 2019 after another descent.

On 5 December 2019, Bracconi returned to Belgium's second tier with R.E. Virton, succeeding the German Dino Toppmöller.

== Managerial statistics ==
As of 30 September 2026

Team	From	To	Record				
Team	From	To	G	W	D	L	Win %
AC Ajaccio	3 November 2013	18 October 2014	40	7	13	20	17.50
CA Bastia	1 July 2015	20 November 2015	15	3	3	9	20.00
AFC Tubize	13 November 2017	30 June 2019	51	10	17	24	19.61
RE Virton	5 December 2019	30 June 2020	10	5	3	2	50.00
FC Saint-Éloi Lupopo	16 August 2021	30 June 2022	19	14	4	1	73.68
RE Virton	9 July 2022	7 February 2023	22	2	8	12	9.09
Olympique Marseille U19	26 July 2023	22 July 2025	64	40	12	12	62.50
Espérance de Tunis	9 February 2026	21 February 2026	3	3	0	0	100.00
Espérance de Tunis	11 May 2026	14 June 2026	5	5	0	0	100.00
Étoile Sportive du Sahel	14 June 2026	present	4	1	2	1	25.00
Total			233	90	62	81	38.63

== Honours ==
=== Player ===
Metz

- Coupe de France: 1987–88

=== Manager ===
Marseille U19

- Coupe Gambardella: 2023–24

Espérance de Tunis

- Tunisian Cup: 2025–26
