= Florian Danho =

French footballer (born 2000)

Personal information
- Full name: Florian Thomas Danho Séké
- Date of birth: 21 June 2000 (age 26)
- Place of birth: Toulouse, France
- Height: 1.88 m (6 ft 2 in)
- Position: Forward

Team information
- Current team: Espérance de Tunis
- Number: 9

Youth career
- 2017–2018: Balma SC
- 2018–2019: Thonon Evian

Senior career*
Years	Team	Apps	(Gls)
2019–2020	Thonon Evian	0	(0)
2020–2021	Martigues	4	(1)
2021–2024	Stade Lausanne Ouchy	44	(9)
2021–2022	→ Stade Nyonnais (loan)	24	(4)
2024	→ Famalicão (loan)	10	(1)
2024–2025	Randers	27	(4)
2025–	Espérance de Tunis	26	(4)
- * Club domestic league appearances and goals as of 22 November 2026

Florian Thomas Danho Séké (born 21 June 2000) is a French professional footballer who plays as a forward for Tunisian Ligue Professionnelle 1 club Espérance de Tunis.

== Career ==
Danho is a product of Balma SC. In 2018 Danho moved to Thonon Evian, where he mainly played for the club's B team in Régional 1 and Régional 2. He also made his debut for the club's first team in a Coupe de France match against Olympique de Valence, where he got around 30 minutes of playing time on 24 November 2019.

In the summer of 2020 he moved to Championnat National 2 club FC Martigues. A year later, in the summer of 2021, Danho moved to Swiss Challenge League club Stade Lausanne Ouchy. A month later, on 5 August 2021, Danho was loaned out to Stade Nyonnais for the upcoming season, in the third best Swiss league.

In the 2022–23 season, Danho was back at Stade Lausanne Ouchy, where he had a great season, scoring seven goals and six assists in 29 games, helping the club gain promotion to the 2023–24 Swiss Super League. In January 2023, the good performance was also rewarded with a contract extension until June 2026. After six months in the Swiss Super League, Danho was loaned to Portuguese Primeira Liga club Famalicão in January 2024 for the rest of the season.

On 1 July 2024, Danish Superliga club Randers FC confirmed that they had bought Danho, who signed a deal until June 2028. Previously, Danho had also been in the sights of another Danish club, Viborg FF, who made an offer for the striker in December 2023. Danho made his debut for Randers in a Danish Superliga match on 21 July 2024, against Vejle Boldklub, where he was in the starting lineup.

In November 2024, Danho underwent surgery for a minor knee injury that kept him out for the rest of the year.

On 19 September 2025, it was confirmed that Danho had joined Tunisian Ligue Professionnelle 1 club Espérance de Tunis on a deal until June 2028.

== Career statistics ==
As of 22 November 2026

Appearances and goals by club, season and competition
Club	Season	League			National cup (Note: Includes Coupe de France, Swiss Cup, Danish Cup and Tunisian Cup)		Continental		Other		Total	
Club	Season	Division	Apps	Goals	Apps	Goals	Apps	Goals	Apps	Goals	Apps	Goals
Thonon Evian	2019–20	Régional 1	0	0	1	0	—		—		1	0
Martigues	2020–21	Régional 1	4	1	0	0	—		—		4	1
Stade Lausanne Ouchy	2022–23	Swiss Challenge League	29	7	2	0	—		—		31	7
Stade Lausanne Ouchy	2023–24	Swiss Super League	15	2	3	1	—		—		18	3
Stade Lausanne Ouchy	Total		44	9	5	1	—		—		49	10
Stade Nyonnais (loan)	2021–22	Promotion League	24	4	1	0	—		—		25	4
Famalicão (loan)	2023–24	Primeira Liga	10	1	—		—		—		10	1
Randers	2024–25	Danish Superliga	19	2	2	3	—		—		21	5
Randers	2025–26	Danish Superliga	8	2	1	0	—		—		9	2
Randers	Total		27	4	3	3	—		—		30	7
Espérance de Tunis	2025–26	Tunisian Ligue Professionnelle 1	22	4	3	1	12 (Note: Appearances in CAF Champions League)	3	—		37	8
Espérance de Tunis	2026–27	Tunisian Ligue Professionnelle 1	4	0	0	0	2	0	—		6	0
Espérance de Tunis	Total		26	4	3	1	14	3	—		43	8
Career total			135	23	13	5	14	3	—		162	31

== Personal life ==
Born in France, Danho is of Ivorian descent.
