= Hamza Jelassi =

Tunisian footballer

Personal information
- Full name: Hamza Jelassi
- Date of birth: 29 September 1991 (age 35)
- Place of birth: Tunis, Tunisia
- Height: 1.89 m (6 ft 2 in)
- Position: Defender

Team information
- Current team: Espérance de Tunis
- Number: 6

Youth career
- 2011–2012: Jendouba Sport

Senior career*
| Years | Team | Apps | (Gls) |
| 2012–2014 | Olympique Béja | 45 | (2) |
| 2014–2016 | Stade Gabèsien | 46 | (3) |
| 2016–2018 | CA Bizertin | 49 | (11) |
| 2018–2023 | CS Sfaxien | 42 | (1) |
| 2018–2022 | US Monastir | 22 | (1) |
| 2022–2023 | Al Ahly Benghazi | 0 | (0) |
| 2023–2024 | Étoile du Sahel | 33 | (6) |
| 2024– | Espérance de Tunis | 53 | (6) |

International career^{‡}
| 2019– | Tunisia | 7 | (0) |
- * Club domestic league appearances and goals as of 22 November 2026 ‡ National team caps and goals as of 7 December 2025

Hamza Jelassi (born 29 September 1991) is a Tunisian professional footballer who plays as a defender for Tunisian Ligue Professionnelle 1 club Espérance de Tunis and the Tunisia national team.

== Honours ==
CS Sfaxien

- Tunisian Cup: 2018–19

US Monastir

- Tunisian Super Cup: 2020

Étoile du Sahel

- Tunisian Ligue Professionnelle 1: 2022–23

Espérance de Tunis

- Tunisian Super Cup: 2024, 2025
- Tunisian Ligue Professionnelle 1: 2024–25
- Tunisian Cup: 2024–25, 2025–26
