= Jack Diarra =

Burkinabe footballer (born 2006)

Personal information
- Full name: Jack Pantoulou Diarra
- Date of birth: 16 June 2006 (age 20)
- Place of birth: Ouagadougou, Burkina Faso
- Height: 1.74 m (5 ft 9 in)
- Position: Winger

Team information
- Current team: Al Ittihad Tripoli
- Number: 19

Youth career
- Salitas

Senior career*
Years	Team	Apps	(Gls)
2023–2025	Salitas	36	(14)
2025–2026	Espérance de Tunis	9	(2)
2025	→ AS Soliman (loan)	9	(2)
2026–	Al Ittihad Tripoli	0	(0)

International career^{‡}
2023	Burkina Faso U17	6	(2)
2025–	Burkina Faso	1	(0)
- * Club domestic league appearances and goals as of 29 September 2026 ‡ National team caps and goals as of 20:05, 21 April 2026 (UTC)

Jack Pantoulou Diarra (born 16 June 2006) is a Burkinabe professional footballer who plays as a winger for Libyan Premier League club Al Ittihad Tripoli and the Burkina Faso national team.

== Club career ==
Diarra is a youth product of the Burkinabe club Salitas, scoring 14 goals in 36 games with them to start his senior career. On 14 June 2025, transferred to Tunisian Ligue Professionnelle 1 club Espérance de Tunis on a contract until 2028. On 25 September 2025, he joined AS Soliman on a season-long loan. On 18 December 2025, his loan was cut short and he returned to Espérance.

== International career ==
Diarra was part of the Burkina Faso U17s for the 2023 U-17 Africa Cup of Nations and the 2023 FIFA U-17 World Cup. He was called up to the Burkina Faso national team for a set of friendlies in March 2026.
