= Mohamed Amine Ben Hamida =

Tunisian association football player

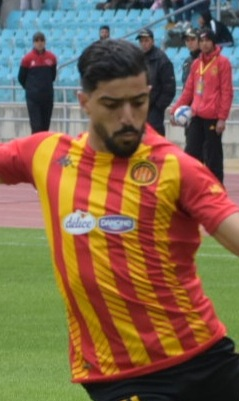
- Ben Hamida in 2023

Personal information
- Full name: Mohamed Amine Ben Hamida
- Date of birth: 15 December 1995 (age 30)
- Place of birth: Tunis, Tunisia
- Height: 1.81 m (5 ft 11 in)
- Position: Left back

Team information
- Current team: Al Hazem
- Number: 3

Youth career
- 2000–2016: Espérance de Tunis

Senior career*
Years	Team	Apps	(Gls)
2016–2026	Espérance de Tunis	131	(6)
2016–2017	→ Olympique Béja (loan)	9	(0)
2017–2019	→ AS Soliman (loan)	0	(0)
2026–	Al Hazem	0	(0)

International career^{‡}
2021–	Tunisia	16	(0)
Medal record
Representing Tunisia
Men's football
FIFA Arab Cup
Runner-up	2021 Qatar
- * Club domestic league appearances and goals as of 16 July 2026 ‡ National team caps and goals as of 26 June 2026

Mohamed Amine Ben Hamida (Arabic: محمد أمين بن حميدة; born 15 December 1995) is a Tunisian footballer who plays as a left back for Saudi Pro League club Al Hazem and the Tunisia national team.

== Club career ==
His contract with Espérance de Tunis runs till 30 June 2026. In 2017, he was transferred from Espérance de Tunis to Avenir de Soliman. Avenir de Soliman received Mohamed Amine Ben Hamida from Espérance de Tunis on a free loan.

== International career ==
He made his debut for the Tunisia national football team on 30 November 2021 in a 2021 FIFA Arab Cup game against Mauritania.

On 15 May 2026, Ben Hamida was named in the Tunisia squad for the 2026 FIFA World Cup.

== Style of play ==
Left is his favoured foot. Mohamed Amine Ben Hamida has also been deployed as a wing back and an inverted wing back.
