= Métlaoui Municipal stadium =

Football stadium in Tunisia

Métlaoui Municipal Stadium
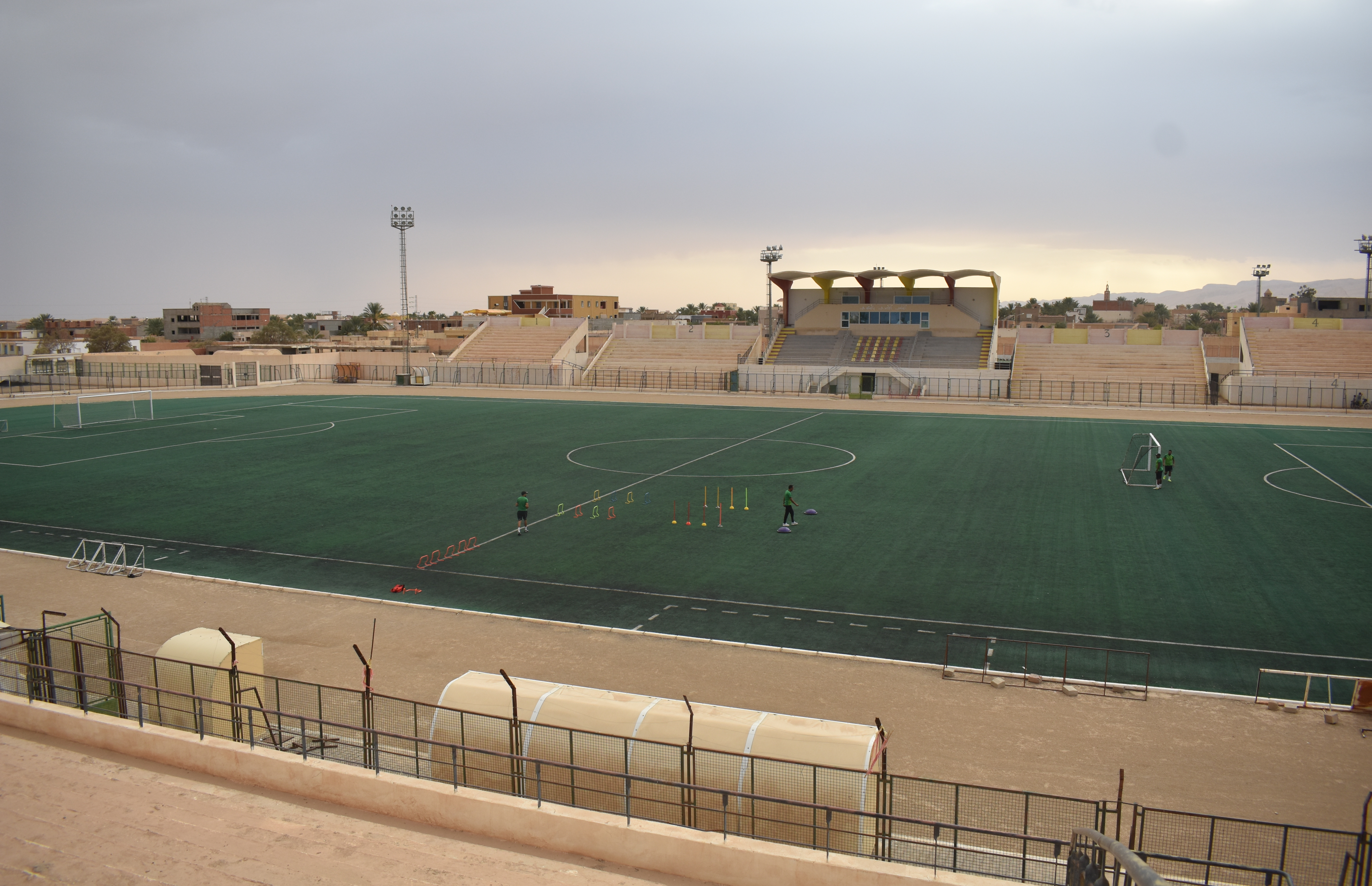
- Interactive map of Métlaoui Municipal Stadium
- Full name: Métlaoui Municipal Stadium
- Location: Métlaoui, Gafsa, Tunisia
- Coordinates: 34.3139°N 8.4018°E
- Capacity: 4,000
- Surface: Grass

Tenant
- ES Métlaoui

The Métlaoui Municipal stadium (Arabic: الملعب البلدي بالمتلوي), is a football stadium located in the town of Métlaoui on the governorate of Gafsa in Tunisia. The stadium hosts the ES Métlaoui matches.
