= Houssem Tka =

Tunisian footballer

Personal information
- Full name: Houssem Tka
- Date of birth: 16 August 2000 (age 26)
- Place of birth: Monastir, Tunisia
- Height: 1.70 m (5 ft 7 in)
- Position: Midfielder

Team information
- Current team: CR Belouizdad
- Number: 8

Youth career
- US Monastir

Senior career*
Years	Team	Apps	(Gls)
2018–2023	US Monastir	84	(3)
2023–2026	Espérance de Tunis	71	(4)
2026–	CR Belouizdad	0	(0)

International career^{‡}
2023–	Tunisia	5	(0)
- * Club domestic league appearances and goals as of 1 July 2026 ‡ National team caps and goals as of 23 December 2025

Houssem Tka (Arabic: حسام تقا; born 16 August 2000) is a Tunisian professional footballer who plays for Algerian Ligue Professionnelle 1 club CR Belouizdad and the Tunisia national team.

== Career ==
Tka started his career with US Monastir where he played his first game on 27 April 2023 against Stade Gabèsien in the 2017–18 Tunisian Ligue Professionnelle 1. On 3 July 2023, he joined Espérance de Tunis on a 3-year contract. On 30 June 2026, he joined Algerian club CR Belouizdad.
