= Onuche Ogbelu =

Nigerian professional footballer

Personal information
- Full name: Onuche Ogbelu
- Date of birth: 10 May 2003 (age 23)
- Place of birth: Nigeria
- Height: 1.85 m (6 ft 1 in)
- Position: Midfielder

Youth career
- Fosla Academy Abuja

Senior career*
Years	Team	Apps	(Gls)
2022–2023	Nasarawa United	3	(1)
2023–2026	Espérance de Tunis	54	(2)

International career^{‡}
2022–2023	Nigeria U20	11	(0)
- * Club domestic league appearances and goals as of 27 June 2026 ‡ National team caps and goals as of 16 May 2023

Onuche Ogbelu (born 10 May 2003) is a Nigerian professional footballer who plays as a midfielder.

== Club career ==
Ogbelu started his career at Fosla Academy. He helped them win the 2021 Principal's Cup.

In December 2022, Ogbelu joined the Nigerian football club Nasarawa United.

On 30 September 2023, Ogbelu signed a 3-year contract with Tunisian giant Espérance de Tunis.

== International career ==
In April 2022, Ogbelu was called up to the Nigerian under-20 side for the 2023 Africa U-20 Cup of Nations. In February 2023, Ogbelu was selected in the final Nigerian squad for the CAF U20 African Cup of Nations held in Egypt. He helped them reach third place. In February 2023, Super Eagles coach Jose Peseiro, selected Ogbelu among four U-20 players to train with his team before their African Cup of Nations qualifying matches.

== Style of play ==
Ogbelu mainly operates as a midfielder. He is known for his "ability to beat the press" and "ball circulation".
