= Taieb Mhiri Stadium =

Stadium in Sfax, Tunisia

- Interactive map of Taieb Mhiri Stadium
- Full name: Taieb Mhiri Stadium
- Former names: Henri Coudrec Stadium (1938–1956)
- Location: Sfax, Tunisia
- Coordinates: 34°44′01″N 10°44′47″E
- Capacity: 12,600
- Surface: Grass

Construction
- Opened: 1938
- Renovated: 2004

Tenants
- Tunisia national football team CS Sfaxien

The Taieb Mhiri Stadium (Arabic: ملعب الطيب المهيري), opened as Henri Coudrec Stadium is a multi-purpose stadium in Sfax, Tunisia. It is currently used mostly for football matches and is the home stadium of CS Sfaxien and Tunisian national team.

Opened in 1938, it holds 12,600 spectators, it was named as Henri Coudrec Stadium, who was one of the French notable personalities and vice-president of the municipality of Sfax, before taking the name of Taieb Mhiri, who was a Tunisian politician and the interior minister from 1956 until his death in 1965. The stadium hosted one match during the 1965 African Cup of Nations and six matches during the 2004 African Cup of Nations.
