= 2024–25 Tunisian Super Cup =

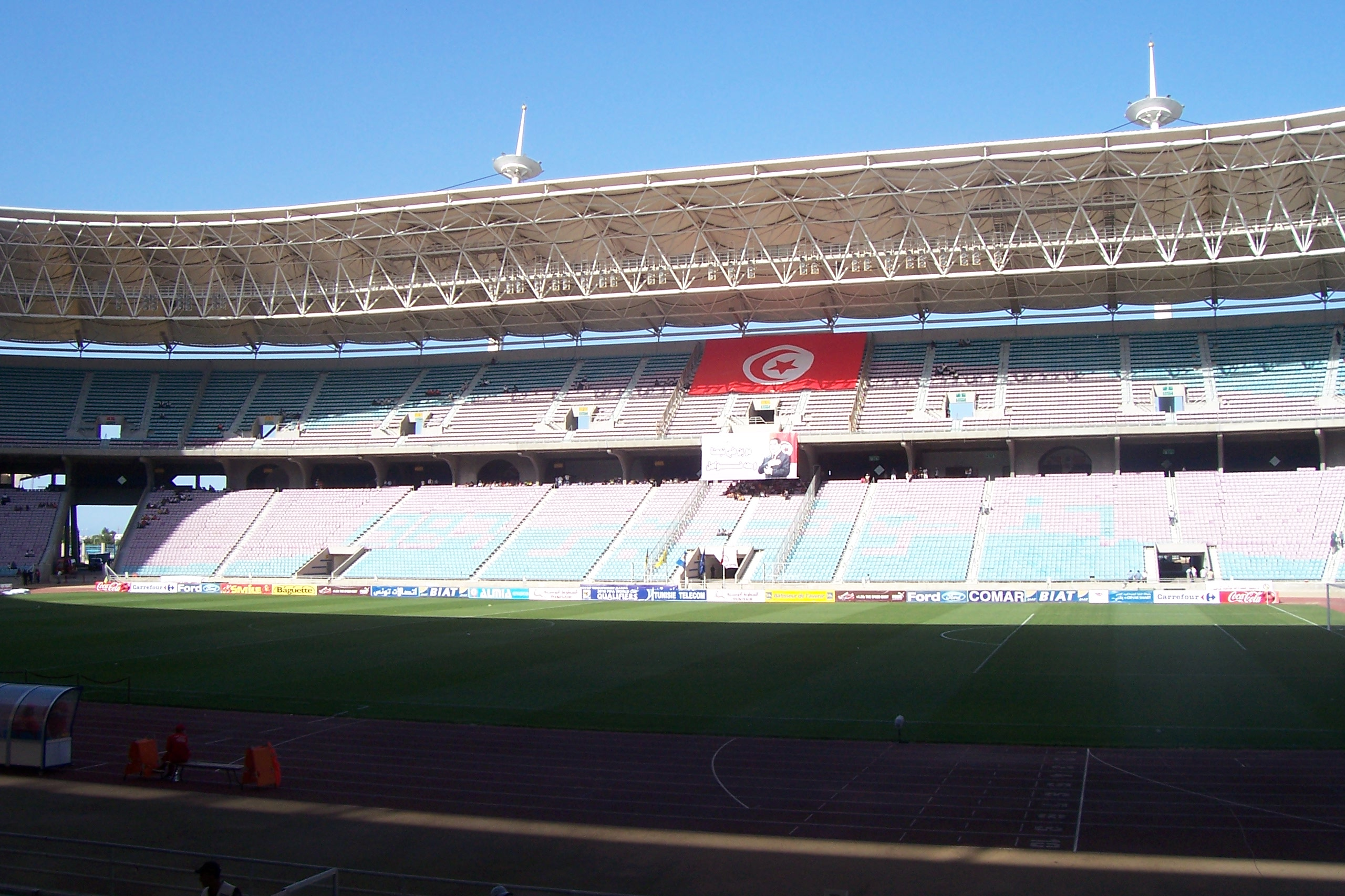
- Hammadi Agrebi Stadium hosted the final

Tournament details
- Host country: Tunisia
- Dates: 27 July – 3 August 2025
- Teams: 3
- Venues: 2 (in 2 host cities)

Final positions
- Champions: Espérance de Tunis (8th title)
- Runners-up: Stade Tunisien

Tournament statistics
- Matches played: 2
- Goals scored: 3 (1.5 per match)
- Attendance: 27,000 (13,500 per match)
- Top scorer: 3 players (1 goal each)

The 2024–25 Tunisian Super Cup was the 20th edition of the Tunisian Super Cup. With Espérance de Tunis winning the league and cup titles for the 2024–25 season and US Monastir and Stade Tunisien finishing second in the league and cup respectively, and there being no clear legal text specifying the other party to the match, it was decided to play a play-off match for the first time between US Monastir and Stade Tunisien at Taieb Mhiri Stadium in Sfax, with the winner qualifying to face Espérance de Tunis in the final at Hammadi Agrebi Stadium in Tunis.

== Context ==
As the league and cup champions for the 2024–25 season, Espérance de Tunis did not recognize their opponent due to the lack of a legal text specifying the Super Cup opponents. In the event that a team wins both, the Tunisian Football Federation has scheduled a play-off match between the league runner-up, US Monastir and the cup runner-up, Stade Tunisien at Taieb Mhiri Stadium in Sfax on 27 July 2025, which was won by Stade Tunisien 2–0 to qualify to face Espérance de Tunis in the final at Hammadi Agrebi Stadium in Tunis on 3 August 2025.

== Matches ==
- Times listed are local.

=== Bracket ===
Play-off match			Final
			1	Espérance de Tunis	1
2	US Monastir	0		Stade Tunisien	0
3	Stade Tunisien	2

=== Play-off match ===
27 July 2025
16:00

US Monastir	0–2	Stade Tunisien
	Report	Mugisha 34' (pen.); Ayari 45+2'

Taieb Mhiri Stadium, Sfax
Attendance: 2,000
Referee: Bacem Belaid

=== Final ===
3 August 2025
17:15

Espérance de Tunis	1–0	Stade Tunisien
Belaïli 39' (pen.)	Report

Hammadi Agrebi Stadium, Tunis
Attendance: 25,000
Referee: Houssem Boularesse

== See also ==
- 2024–25 Tunisian Ligue Professionnelle 1
- 2024–25 Tunisian Cup
