= 2026–27 Espérance Sportive de Tunis season =

Espérance de Tunis
2026–27 season
- President: Hamdi Meddeb
- Manager: Laurențiu Reghecampf (until 24 September); Pablo Franco (from 3 October)
- Stadium: Hammadi Agrebi Stadium
- Ligue 1: 2nd
- Tunisian Cup: Round of 32
- Tunisian Super Cup: Final
- CAF Champions League: Group stage
- Top goalscorer: League: Hazem Mastouri (4); All: Hazem Mastouri (4)
- Biggest win: Espérance de Tunis 3–1 Olympique Béja (10 October 2026)
- Biggest defeat: JS El Omrane 3–1 Espérance de Tunis (30 August 2026)
- All statistics correct as of 22 November 2026.

The 2026–27 Espérance Sportive de Tunis season is the 108th season in existence and the club's 72nd consecutive season in the top flight of Tunisian football.

In addition to the domestic league, Espérance de Tunis are participating in this season editions of the Tunisian Cup, the Tunisian Super Cup and the CAF Champions League.

== Pre-season ==
=== Managerial change and coaching staff ===
On 15 June 2026, Espérance Sportive de Tunis officially announced the appointment of Laurențiu Reghecampf as the new head coach. The Romanian, who had already managed the club between November 2024 and March 2025, signed a contract and took charge for the 2026–27 season.

On 6 July 2026, the club unveiled its coaching staff for the season. Reghecampf was assisted by Viorel Dinu (first assistant) and Mohamed Amine Naffati (second assistant). Physical preparation was entrusted to Slim Labreg, assisted by Hassen Ksouri, while Mabrouk Akremi became goalkeeping coach.

=== Return and training camps ===
Training resumed on 12 July 2026 at Parc B.

A ten-day training camp took place in Aïn Draham from 16 July to 26 July 2026.

==== Friendly matches ====
During the preparation period, the team faced several opponents of different levels. They also played Najm Khemiri and Union de Carthage, two Tunisian amateur clubs. They faced PS Sakiet Eddaïer, a Tunisian club that had just been promoted to Ligue 1 after winning the Ligue 2 title. They also played AS Marsa, a Tunisian Ligue 1 club. Later, they played FC San Pédro, an Ivorian club that won the Ivorian Ligue 1 in 2024 and was competing in the CAF Champions League qualifiers for the 2026–27 season. These matches allowed the club to see new players, try several ways of playing and give playing time to everyone. The overall record was good, with four wins, one draw and only one defeat.

24 July 2026	Espérance de Tunis	2–0	Najm Khemiri	Aïn Draham
	Chikhaoui	Report		Stadium: Aïn Draham Sports Complex

26 July 2026	Espérance de Tunis	3–1	PS Sakiet Eddaïer	Aïn Draham
	Belhadj Mahmoud; Jabri; Danho (pen.)	Report	Aloui	Stadium: Aïn Draham Sports Complex

31 July 2026	Espérance de Tunis	2–1	Union de Carthage	Tunis
	Chikhaoui 30'; Belhadj Mahmoud	Report		Stadium: Espérance de Tunis Training Center

4 August 2026	Espérance de Tunis	2–2	(Saudi Arabia) Al Hazem	Tunis
	Rafia 45+2', 60'	Report		Stadium: Chedly Zouiten Stadium

6 August 2026	Espérance de Tunis	1–0	(Ivory Coast) FC San Pédro	Tunis
	Belhadj Mahmoud 37'	Report		Stadium: Chedly Zouiten Stadium

8 August 2026	Espérance de Tunis	1–2	AS Marsa	Tunis
	Hadj Ali 40'	Report	Polaco 27'; O. Traidi 69'	Stadium: Espérance de Tunis Training Center

=== Mid-season managerial change ===
After the international break and the first four league rounds, Espérance had made a start with three wins and one defeat, which put them at the top of the table. It was in this context that FCSB, the Romanian club, went through a serious crisis after a heavy 5–0 defeat. The board decided to part ways with their manager and turned immediately to Laurențiu Reghecampf, who had already managed the club before. The Romanian then began negotiations with the Romanian club to terminate his contract with Espérance. After ten hours of talks, no agreement was reached. Reghecampf then decided to travel to Romania without informing the Tunisian club, thus missing the training camp in Aïn Draham. Faced with this inexplicable absence, Espérance called in a bailiff to record the situation and protect its interests. Reghecampf eventually signed for Steaua București without having settled his departure with Espérance, which prompted the club to prepare a case to sue him before FIFA and the Court of Arbitration for Sport (CAS). The affair shook the club and its supporters, who saw their coach leave mid-season without any explanation.

Espérance de Tunis entrusted the interim to Belgian coach Joël Crahay, initially engaged to ensure the transition. Meanwhile, the board reached an agreement with Spaniard Pablo Franco to take charge of the team. Franco, fresh from winning the Moroccan championship with Maghreb Fez in the 2025–26 season, arrived with his assistant Mejdi Traoui.

Due to a family-related issue, Pablo Franco was unable to manage the two friendly matches, and the Belgian interim manager Joël Crahay took charge of both games. The first was against Libyan Ligue 1 club Olympic Azzaweya SC on 26 September 2026, and the second against Tunisian Ligue 2 side US Bousalem on 29 September 2026. These fixtures allowed the coaching staff to assess the players and prepare the team for the upcoming league and continental commitments. A third friendly was scheduled against Al Ittihad Al Asskary on 4 October 2026, and a fourth against ES Fahs on 11 October 2026.

26 September 2026	Espérance de Tunis	4–0	(Libya) Olympic Azzaweya	Aïn Draham
15:00	Jabri 47'; Ribeiro 49'; Belaïli 57'; Faraj 67'	Report		Stadium: Aïn Draham Sports Complex

29 September 2026	Espérance de Tunis	5–0	US Bousalem	Aïn Draham
15:00	Belaïli 25'; Ribeiro 39'; Danho 62'; Faraj 65'; Hadj Ali 72'	Report		Stadium: Aïn Draham Sports Complex

4 October 2026	Espérance de Tunis	3–1	(Libya) Al Ittihad Al Asskary	Tunis
15:00	Belaïli 19'; Jabri 88'; Rafia 90+2'	Report		Stadium: Espérance de Tunis Training Center

11 October 2026	Espérance de Tunis	4–0	ES Fahs	Tunis
11:30	Jebali 49'; Becha 62'; Belhadj Mahmoud 70'; Jabri 77'	Report		Stadium: Espérance de Tunis Training Center

8 November 2026	Espérance de Tunis	3–2	(France) Monaco U23	Tunis
11:00	Guenichi 7'; Danho 38', 89'	Report		Stadium: Espérance de Tunis Training Center

== Squad list ==
Note: Flags indicate the national team, defined under FIFA eligibility rules. Players may hold more than one non-FIFA nationality.

Staff

- (Spain) Aitor van den Brule (assistant manager) (from 6 October)
- (Tunisia) Mejdi Traoui (assistant manager) (from 24 September)
- (Tunisia) Mohamed Amine Naffati (assistant manager)
- (Tunisia) Mabrouk Akremi (Goalkeeping coach)
- (Tunisia) Slim Labreg (fitness manager)
- (Tunisia) Hassen Ksouri (fitness manager)
- (Tunisia) Khalil Bouzaiene (mental preparer)
- (Tunisia) Youssef Arnaz (mental preparer)
- (Romania) Viorel Dinu (assistant manager) (until 24 September)

No.	Nat.	Name	Date of Birth (Age)	Since	Signed from
Goalkeepers
1	(Tunisia)	Amenallah Memmiche	20 April 2004 (age 22)	2023	(Tunisia) Youth system
22	(Tunisia)	Montasser Essid	4 January 2000 (age 26)	2026	(Tunisia) JS El Omrane
32	(Tunisia)	Bechir Ben Saïd	29 November 1992 (age 33)	2024	(Tunisia) US Monastir
Defenders
2	(Tunisia)	Mohamed Ben Ali	16 February 1995 (age 31)	2022	(Tunisia) CS Sfaxien
3	(Tunisia)	Elies Araar	7 October 2006 (age 20)	2026	(France) Strasbourg
4	(Tunisia)	Marouane Sahraoui	9 January 1996 (age 30)	2026	(Tunisia) Stade Tunisien
6	(Tunisia)	Hamza Jelassi	29 September 1991 (age 35)	2024	(Tunisia) Étoile du Sahel
12	(Tunisia)	Nidhal Laifi	1 May 1998 (age 28)	2025	(Tunisia) Stade Tunisien
13	(Tunisia)	Mohamed Dräger	25 June 1996 (age 30)	2026	(Germany) Eintracht Braunschweig
25	(Tunisia)	Raed Chikhaoui	9 June 2004 (age 22)	2026	(Tunisia) US Monastir
28	(Algeria)	Adem Alilet	17 January 1999 (age 27)	2026	(Libya) Al Ittihad Tripoli
—	(Sweden)	Elyas Bouzaiene	8 September 1997 (age 29)	2024	(Sweden) Västerås SK
—	(Tunisia)	Ala Derbali	19 May 2005 (age 21)	2025	(Tunisia) Youth system
Midfielders
8	(Tunisia)	Hamza Rafia	2 April 1999 (age 27)	2026	(Italy) Lecce
14	(Tunisia)	Khairi Meddaoui	27 June 2004 (age 22)	2024	(Tunisia) Youth system
15	(Tunisia)	Khalil Guenichi	11 December 2002 (age 23)	2022	(Tunisia) Youth system
16	(Peru)	Jesús Castillo	11 June 2001 (age 25)	2026	(Peru) Universitario de Deportes
17	(Tunisia)	Haytham Dhaou	1 January 2005 (age 21)	2025	(Tunisia) Youth system
18	(Tunisia)	Moez Hadj Ali	9 August 1999 (age 27)	2026	(Tunisia) US Monastir
20	(Tunisia)	Mohamed Belhadj Mahmoud	24 April 2000 (age 26)	2026	(Switzerland) Lugano
21	(Ivory Coast)	Abdramane Konaté	25 June 2006 (age 20)	2024	(Ivory Coast) San Pédro
31	(Tunisia)	Chiheb Jebali	26 May 1996 (age 30)	2025	(Tunisia) US Monastir
36	(Tunisia)	Arkem Taboubi	5 October 2006 (age 20)	2025	(Tunisia) Youth system
Forwards
7	(France)	Imad Faraj	11 February 1999 (age 27)	2026	(Azerbaijan) Neftchi Baku
9	(France)	Florian Danho	21 June 2000 (age 26)	2025	(Denmark) Randers
10	(Brazil)	Lucas Ribeiro	9 October 1998 (age 28)	2026	(Libya) Al Ittihad Tripoli
11	(Algeria)	Youcef Belaïli (C)	14 March 1992 (age 34)	2024	(Algeria) MC Alger
19	(Tunisia)	Achref Jabri	16 December 2001 (age 24)	2022	(Tunisia) Youth system
23	(Ivory Coast)	Namory Keita	2 June 2007 (age 19)	2026	(Ivory Coast) RC Abidjan
24	(Tunisia)	Youssef Becha	13 April 2005 (age 21)	2026	(Tunisia) CS Sfaxien
27	(Tunisia)	Hazem Mastouri	18 June 1997 (age 29)	2026	(Russia) Dynamo Makhachkala
29	(Cameroon)	Maël Fernandez	5 January 2007 (age 19)	2026	(Cameroon) Gazelle Garoua
Manager	(Spain)	Pablo Franco	11 June 1980 (age 46)	2026	(Morocco) Maghreb Fez

== Transfers ==
=== In ===
Date	Pos.	Name	From	Type	Source
1 July 2026	MF	(Tunisia) Khairi Meddaoui	(Tunisia) Stade Gabèsien	End of loan	
1 July 2026	GK	(Tunisia) Montasser Essid	(Tunisia) JS El Omrane	Transfer	
1 July 2026	DF	(Tunisia) Marouane Sahraoui	(Tunisia) Stade Tunisien	Free transfer	
3 July 2026	FW	(Tunisia) Youssef Becha	(Tunisia) CS Sfaxien	Free transfer	
14 July 2026	DF	(Tunisia) Raed Chikhaoui	(Tunisia) US Monastir	Transfer	
14 July 2026	FW	(Cameroon) Maël Fernandez	(Cameroon) Gazelle Garoua	Transfer	
15 July 2026	MF	(Tunisia) Mohamed Belhadj Mahmoud	(Switzerland) Lugano	Free transfer	
23 July 2026	FW	(Tunisia) Adel Bettaieb	(Romania) Argeș Pitești	Free transfer	
8 August 2026	MF	(Peru) Jesús Castillo	(Peru) Universitario de Deportes	Transfer	
14 August 2026	FW	(Brazil) Lucas Ribeiro	(Libya) Al Ittihad Tripoli	Transfer	
17 August 2026	FW	(France) Imad Faraj	(Azerbaijan) Neftchi Baku	Transfer	
27 August 2026	FW	(Tunisia) Hazem Mastouri	(Russia) Dynamo Makhachkala	Transfer	
19 September 2026	DF	(Algeria) Adem Alilet	(Libya) Al Ittihad Tripoli	Free transfer	
24 September 2026	FW	(Ivory Coast) Namory Keita	(Ivory Coast) RC Abidjan	Transfer	

=== Out ===
Date	Pos.	Name	To	Type	Source
1 July 2026	MF	(Brazil) Yan Sasse	(Uzbekistan) Neftchi Fergana	End of contract	
1 July 2026	MF	(Tunisia) Wael Derbali	(Sweden) Brommapojkarna	End of contract	
1 July 2026	MF	(Tunisia) Zakaria El Ayeb	(Tunisia) Stade Tunisien	End of contract	
1 July 2026	MF	(Tunisia) Ghaith Ouahabi	(United Arab Emirates) Hatta	End of contract	
1 July 2026	MF	(Nigeria) Onuche Ogbelu	(Libya) Al Ittihad Tripoli	End of contract	
1 July 2026	MF	(Tunisia) Houssem Tka	(Algeria) CR Belouizdad	End of contract	
1 July 2026	DF	(Tunisia) Yassine Meriah	(Tunisia) Club Africain	End of contract	
1 July 2026	DF	(Tunisia) Mohamed Amine Ben Hamida	(Saudi Arabia) Al Hazem	End of contract	
1 July 2026	FW	(Tunisia) Youssef Msakni	Retirement	Mutual termination	—
14 July 2026	FW	(Tunisia) Ahmed Bouassida	(Tunisia) US Monastir	Transfer	—
18 July 2026	DF	(Tunisia) Amenallah Majhed	(United Arab Emirates) Al Wahda	Transfer	
21 July 2026	DF	(Algeria) Mohamed Amine Tougai	(Libya) Al Ahli Tripoli	Transfer	
27 July 2026	FW	(The Gambia) Kebba Sowe	(Tunisia) ES Zarzis	Transfer	
30 July 2026	FW	(Tunisia) Koussay Maacha	(Tunisia) AS Marsa	Transfer	
30 July 2026	FW	(Tunisia) Rayen Hamrouni	(Tunisia) AS Marsa	Transfer	
5 August 2026	FW	(Tunisia) Younes Rached	Free agent	Mutual termination	—
5 August 2026	DF	(Tunisia) Aziz Knani	(Tunisia) Stade Tunisien	Free transfer	
5 August 2026	DF	(Tunisia) Aziz Koudhai	(Tunisia) CS Hammam-Lif	Loan	
6 August 2026	MF	(Belgium) Mohamed Mouhli	(Belgium) Olympic Charleroi	Free transfer	
11 August 2026	FW	(Algeria) Kouceila Boualia	(Algeria) CR Belouizdad	Mutual termination	
17 August 2026	FW	(Tunisia) Adel Bettaieb	(Morocco) Raja CA	Mutual termination	
19 August 2026	GK	(Tunisia) Mokhtar Ifaoui	(Tunisia) US Ben Guerdane	Loan	
20 August 2026	FW	(Mali) Aboubacar Diakité	(Saudi Arabia) Al Hazem	Transfer	
2 September 2026	FW	(Burkina Faso) Jack Diarra	(Libya) Al Ittihad Tripoli	Transfer	
24 September 2026	GK	(Tunisia) Mohamed Sedki Debchi	(Bahrain) Hidd	Transfer	
25 September 2026	FW	(Tunisia) Zinedine Kada	(Libya) Al Tahaddy SC	Loan	
5 October 2026	DF	(Mauritania) Ibrahima Keita	(Libya) Al Sadaqa	Free transfer	
4 November 2026	FW	(South Africa) Elias Mokwana	(South Africa) Kaizer Chiefs	Free transfer	

== Competitions ==
=== Overview ===
Competition	Record								Starting round	Final position / round	First match	Last match
Competition	G	W	D	L	GF	GA	GD	Win %	Starting round	Final position / round	First match	Last match
Ligue 1	8	5	2	1	11	7	+4	62.50	—N/a	2nd	23 August 2026	2027
Tunisian Cup	0	0	0	0	0	0	+0	—	Round of 32	Round of 32	2026–2027	2026–2027
Tunisian Super Cup	0	0	0	0	0	0	+0	—	Final	Final	31 January 2027	
CAF Champions League	2	1	0	1	1	1	+0	50.00	Second round	Group stage	18 October 2026	2027
Total	10	6	2	2	12	8	+4	60.00			23 August 2026	2027

Updated to match played 22 November 2026
Source: Competitions

=== Ligue 1 ===
==== League table ====
Pos	Team	Pld	W	D	L	GF	GA	GD	Pts	Qualification or relegation
1	US Ben Guerdane	8	5	2	1	12	7	+5	17	Qualification for the Champions League
2	Espérance de Tunis	8	5	2	1	11	7	+4	17	Qualification for the Champions League
3	Stade Tunisien	8	5	1	2	11	7	+4	16	Qualification for the Confederation Cup
4	US Monastir	8	4	3	1	10	6	+4	15	
5	Club Africain	8	4	2	2	8	6	+2	14	

Updated to match(es) played on 22 November 2026. Source: Flashscore
Rules for classification: 1) points; 2) head-to-head points; 3) head-to-head goal difference; 4) goal difference; 5) total goals; 6) fairplay ranking; 7) playoff.

==== Results by round ====
Round	1	2	3	4	5	6	7	8	9	10	11	12	13	14	15	16	17	18	19	20	21	22	23	24	25	26	27	28	29	30
Ground	H	A	H	A	H	A	H	A	H	A	H	A	H	A	H	A	H	A	H	A	H	A	H	A	H	A	H	A	H	A
Result	W	L	W	W	W	D	W	D																						
Position	2	10	6	2																										
Points	3	3	6	9	12	13	16	17																						

Updated to match(es) played on 22 November 2026. Source: Competitive matches
A = Away; H = Home; W = Win; D = Draw; L = Loss

==== Score overview ====
Key: Espérance de Tunis goals shown first.

Opposition	Home score	Away score	Aggregate score	Double
AS Marsa	2–1	20–21 February 2027	—N/a	—N/a
Club Africain	2027	0–0	—N/a	No
CA Bizertin	29–30 December 2026	2027	—N/a	—N/a
CS Hammam-Lif	9–11 March 2027	1–0	—N/a	—N/a
CS Sfaxien	17–19 March 2027	0–0	—N/a	No
ES Hammam Sousse	9–10 December 2026	2027	—N/a	—N/a
ES Métlaoui	3–4 February 2027	2027	—N/a	—N/a
Étoile du Sahel	3–2	6–7 February 2027	—N/a	—N/a
ES Zarzis	23–24 December 2026	2027	—N/a	—N/a
JS El Omrane	13–14 February 2027	1–3	—N/a	No
Olympique Béja	3–1	13–14 March 2027	—N/a	—N/a
PS Sakiet Eddaïer	2027	2–4 January 2027	—N/a	—N/a
Stade Tunisien	2027	12–13 December 2026	—N/a	—N/a
US Ben Guerdane	2027	26–27 December 2026	—N/a	—N/a
US Monastir	1–0	2027	—N/a	—N/a

==== Matches ====
23 August 2026 Round 1	Espérance de Tunis	3–2	Étoile du Sahel	Tunis
16:30	Belhadj Mahmoud 15', (yellow card) 90+3'; Belaïli (penalty missed) 25'; Ben Ali (yellow card) 35'; Hadj Ali 75', 82'; Memmiche (yellow card) 88'	Report	Bouslama (yellow card) 19'; Ben Dhiaf 53' (pen.), (yellow card) 73'; Abid 60'	Stadium: Hammadi Agrebi Stadium; Referee: Haithem Trabelsi

30 August 2026 Round 2	JS El Omrane	3–1	Espérance de Tunis	Tunis
16:30	Belhadj 12'; Kouki (yellow card) 24'; Marouani (yellow card) 34'; Hammami (yellow card) 39'; Mgannem (yellow card) 43'; Hanzouli (yellow card) 43'; Zoghlami 48'; Ben Hamida (yellow card) 57'; Souissi 88'	Report	Konaté (yellow card) 45+5'; Ben Ali (red card) 63'; Mastouri 89'	Stadium: Chedly Zouiten Stadium; Referee: Seif Ouertani

6 September 2026 Round 3	Espérance de Tunis	2–1	AS Marsa	Tunis
16:30	Fernandez 24', (yellow card) 51'; Belhadj Mahmoud (yellow card) 49'; Belaïli 67'; Essid (yellow card) 68'	Report	Mani 36'; Jebali (yellow card) 43'; Khalfa (yellow card) 44'	Stadium: Hammadi Agrebi Stadium; Referee: Badis Ben Salah

13 September 2026 Round 4	CS Hammam-Lif	0–1	Espérance de Tunis	Tunis
16:00	Ghrairi (yellow card) 22'; Ben Ammar (yellow card) 37'; Mhamdi (yellow card) 72'	Report	Konaté (yellow card) 37'; Sahraoui 56', (yellow card) 60'; Belaïli (yellow card) 72'	Stadium: Bou Kornine Stadium; Referee: Aymen Nasri

10 October 2026 Round 5	Espérance de Tunis	3–1	Olympique Béja	Tunis
14:30	Mastouri 1', 13', 48'; Jelassi (yellow card) 12'; Hadj Ali (yellow card) 89'	Report	Djoumekou (yellow card) 37'; Mabrouk 59', (yellow card) 82'	Stadium: Hammadi Agrebi Stadium; Attendance: 0 (close doors); Referee: Houssem Boularesse

29 October 2026 Round 6	CS Sfaxien	0–0	Espérance de Tunis	Sfax
14:30	Mhadhebi (yellow card) 36'; Maâloul (yellow card) 84'	Report	Hadj Ali (yellow card) 66'; Chikhaoui (yellow card) 86'	Stadium: Taieb Mhiri Stadium; Referee: Badis Ben Salah

7 November 2026 Round 7	Espérance de Tunis	1–0	US Monastir	Tunis
14:30	Belhadj Mahmoud (yellow card) 13'; Faraj 56'	Report	Azzouz (yellow card) 19'; Slama (yellow card) 26'; Amri (yellow card) 33'; Diané (yellow card) 50'	Stadium: Hammadi Agrebi Stadium; Referee: Ahmed Dhaouadi

22 November 2026 Round 8	Club Africain	0–0	Espérance de Tunis	Tunis
14:30	Chamakh (yellow card) 44'; Simpara (yellow card) 57'; Ben Ali (yellow card) 65'; Bouguerra (red card) 72'	Report	Jelassi (yellow card) 34'; Rafia (yellow card) 46'; Ribeiro (yellow card) 57'; Danho (yellow card) 81'	Stadium: Hammadi Agrebi Stadium; Referee: Felix Zwayer (Germany)

9–10 December 2026 Round 9	Espérance de Tunis	v	ES Hammam Sousse	Tunis
		Report		Stadium: Hammadi Agrebi Stadium

12–13 December 2026 Round 10	Stade Tunisien	v	Espérance de Tunis	Tunis
		Report		Stadium: Hédi Enneifer Stadium

23–24 December 2026 Round 11	Espérance de Tunis	v	ES Zarzis	Tunis
		Report		Stadium: Hammadi Agrebi Stadium

26–27 December 2026 Round 12	US Ben Guerdane	v	Espérance de Tunis	Ben Guerdane
		Report		Stadium: 7 March Stadium

29–30 December 2026 Round 13	Espérance de Tunis	v	CA Bizertin	Tunis
		Report		Stadium: Hammadi Agrebi Stadium

2–4 January 2027 Round 14	PS Sakiet Eddaïer	v	Espérance de Tunis	Sfax
		Report		Stadium: Taieb Mhiri Stadium

3–4 February 2027 Round 15	Espérance de Tunis	v	ES Métlaoui	Tunis
		Report		Stadium: Hammadi Agrebi Stadium

6–7 February 2027 Round 16	Étoile du Sahel	v	Espérance de Tunis	Sousse
				Stadium: Sousse Olympic Stadium

13–14 February 2027 Round 17	Espérance de Tunis	v	JS El Omrane	Tunis
				Stadium: Hammadi Agrebi Stadium

20–21 February 2027 Round 18	AS Marsa	v	Espérance de Tunis	Tunis
				Stadium: Abdelaziz Chtioui Stadium

9–11 March 2027 Round 19	Espérance de Tunis	v	CS Hammam-Lif	Tunis
				Stadium: Hammadi Agrebi Stadium

13–14 March 2027 Round 20	Olympique Béja	v	Espérance de Tunis	Béja
				Stadium: Boujemaa Kmiti Stadium

17–19 March 2027 Round 21	Espérance de Tunis	v	CS Sfaxien	Tunis
				Stadium: Hammadi Agrebi Stadium

2027 Round 22	US Monastir	v	Espérance de Tunis	Monastir
				Stadium: Mustapha Ben Jannet Stadium

2027 Round 23	Espérance de Tunis	v	Club Africain	Tunis
				Stadium: Hammadi Agrebi Stadium

2027 Round 24	ES Hammam Sousse	v	Espérance de Tunis	Sousse
				Stadium: Bou Ali Lahouar Stadium

2027 Round 25	Espérance de Tunis	v	Stade Tunisien	Tunis
				Stadium: Hammadi Agrebi Stadium

2027 Round 26	ES Zarzis	v	Espérance de Tunis	Zarzis
				Stadium: Abdessalam Kazouz Stadium

2027 Round 27	Espérance de Tunis	v	US Ben Guerdane	Tunis
				Stadium: Hammadi Agrebi Stadium

2027 Round 28	CA Bizertin	v	Espérance de Tunis	Bizerte
				Stadium: 15 October Stadium

2027 Round 29	Espérance de Tunis	v	PS Sakiet Eddaïer	Tunis
				Stadium: Hammadi Agrebi Stadium

2027 Round 30	ES Métlaoui	v	Espérance de Tunis	Métlaoui
				Stadium: Métlaoui Municipal Stadium

==== Results summary ====
Overall								Home						Away					
Pld	W	D	L	GF	GA	GD	Pts	W	D	L	GF	GA	GD	W	D	L	GF	GA	GD
8	5	2	1	11	7	+4	17	4	0	0	9	4	+5	1	2	1	2	3	−1

Last updated: 22 November 2026.
Source: Competitive matches

=== Tunisian Cup ===
Espérance de Tunis will enter the tournament in the round of 32, as they are part of the 2026–27 Tunisian Ligue Professionnelle 1.

=== Tunisian Super Cup ===
31 January 2027	Club Africain	v	Espérance de Tunis
		Report

=== CAF Champions League ===
==== Qualifying rounds ====
The draw of the qualifying rounds was held on 6 August 2026.

===== Second round =====
18 October 2026 First leg	Asswehly (Libya)	1–0	(Tunisia) Espérance de Tunis	Misrata
19:00 UTC+2	Eissa (yellow card) 62'; Ayed 64' (pen.); Ejfala (yellow card) 72'	Report	Jelassi (yellow card) 25'; Belaïli (yellow card) 29' (yellow-red card) 90+6'; Mastouri (yellow card) 62'	Stadium: Misurata Stadium; Referee: Jean-Pierre Nguyen (DR Congo)

24 October 2026 Second leg	Espérance de Tunis (Tunisia)	1–0 (1–1 agg.) (3–1 p)	(Libya) Asswehly	Tunis
17:00 UTC+1	Faraj 8'; Rafia (yellow card) 54'; Laifi (yellow card) 62'; Jelassi (yellow card) 90'; Belhadj Mahmoud (yellow card) 90+3'	Report	Sibo (yellow card) 74'	Stadium: Hammadi Agrebi Stadium; Referee: Jalal Jayed (Morocco)
	Penalties
	Ribeiro (penalty scored); Rafia (penalty missed); Hadj Ali (penalty scored); Alilet (penalty scored)		(penalty missed) Ayed; (penalty scored) Ghandri; (penalty missed) Elgelaib; (penalty missed) Banda

==== Group stage ====
The draw for the group stage was held on 28 October 2026.

Group A

Pos	Team	Pld	W	D	L	GF	GA	GD	Pts	Qualification	EST	APL	FCN	WSC
1	(Tunisia) Espérance de Tunis	0	0	0	0	0	0	0	0	Advance to knockout stage	—	18–20 Dec	22–24 Jan	28 Nov
2	(Angola) Petro de Luanda	0	0	0	0	0	0	0	0	Advance to knockout stage	8–10 Jan	—	29 Nov	22–24 Jan
3	(Mauritania) Nouadhibou	0	0	0	0	0	0	0	0		6 Dec	15–17 Jan	—	8–10 Jan
4	(Angola) Wiliete	0	0	0	0	0	0	0	0		15–17 Jan	6 Dec	18–20 Dec	—

First match(es) will be played: 28 November 2026. Source: CAF

28 November 2026 Matchday 1	Espérance de Tunis (Tunisia)	v	(Angola) Wiliete	Tunis
17:00 UTC+1		Report		Stadium: Hammadi Agrebi Stadium; Referee: Omar Artan (Somalia)

6 December 2026 Matchday 2	Nouadhibou (Mauritania)	v	(Tunisia) Espérance de Tunis	Nouakchott
19:00 UTC+0		Report		Stadium: Nouakchott Olympic Stadium

18–20 December 2026 Matchday 3	Espérance de Tunis (Tunisia)	v	(Angola) Petro de Luanda	Tunis
--:-- UTC+1		Report		Stadium: Hammadi Agrebi Stadium

8–10 January 2027 Matchday 4	Petro de Luanda (Angola)	v	(Tunisia) Espérance de Tunis	Luanda
--:-- UTC+1		Report		Stadium: 11 November Stadium

15–17 January 2027 Matchday 5	Wiliete (Angola)	v	(Tunisia) Espérance de Tunis	Lubango
--:-- UTC+1		Report		Stadium: Tundavala Stadium

22–24 January 2027 Matchday 6	Espérance de Tunis (Tunisia)	v	(Mauritania) Nouadhibou	Tunis
--:-- UTC+1		Report		Stadium: Hammadi Agrebi Stadium

== Statistics ==
- ^{‡} Player played at least one game and left the club during the season.
- ^{y} Youth team

=== Playing statistics ===
- Players with no appearances are not included on the list.

No.	Pos	Nat	Player	Total		Ligue 1		Tunisian Cup		CAF Champions League		Tunisian Super Cup	
No.	Pos	Nat	Player	Apps	Goals	Apps	Goals	Apps	Goals	Apps	Goals	Apps	Goals
1	GK	(Tunisia)	Amenallah Memmiche	3	0	3	0	0	0	0	0	0	0
2	DF	(Tunisia)	Mohamed Ben Ali	3	0	3	0	0	0	0	0	0	0
4	DF	(Tunisia)	Marouane Sahraoui	3	1	3	1	0	0	0	0	0	0
6	DF	(Tunisia)	Hamza Jelassi	9	0	7	0	0	0	2	0	0	0
7	FW	(France)	Imad Faraj	10	2	8	1	0	0	2	1	0	0
8	MF	(Tunisia)	Hamza Rafia	10	0	8	0	0	0	2	0	0	0
9	FW	(France)	Florian Danho	6	0	4	0	0	0	2	0	0	0
10	FW	(Brazil)	Lucas Ribeiro	7	0	6	0	0	0	1	0	0	0
11	FW	(Algeria)	Youcef Belaïli	9	1	8	1	0	0	1	0	0	0
12	DF	(Tunisia)	Nidhal Laifi	10	0	8	0	0	0	2	0	0	0
13	DF	(Tunisia)	Mohamed Dräger	8	0	6	0	0	0	2	0	0	0
16	MF	(Peru)	Jesús Castillo	9	0	7	0	0	0	2	0	0	0
18	MF	(Tunisia)	Moez Hadj Ali	10	2	8	2	0	0	2	0	0	0
19	FW	(Tunisia)	Achref Jabri	5	0	5	0	0	0	0	0	0	0
20	MF	(Tunisia)	Mohamed Belhadj Mahmoud	9	1	7	1	0	0	2	0	0	0
21	MF	(Ivory Coast)	Abdramane Konaté	9	0	7	0	0	0	2	0	0	0
22	GK	(Tunisia)	Montasser Essid	1	0	1	0	0	0	0	0	0	0
24	FW	(Tunisia)	Youssef Becha	2	0	2	0	0	0	0	0	0	0
25	DF	(Tunisia)	Raed Chikhaoui	10	0	8	0	0	0	2	0	0	0
27	FW	(Tunisia)	Hazem Mastouri	8	4	6	4	0	0	2	0	0	0
28	DF	(Algeria)	Adem Alilet	1	0	0	0	0	0	1	0	0	0
29	FW	(Cameroon)	Maël Fernandez	6	1	4	1	0	0	2	0	0	0
31	MF	(Tunisia)	Chiheb Jebali	2	0	2	0	0	0	0	0	0	0
32	GK	(Tunisia)	Bechir Ben Saïd	6	0	4	0	0	0	2	0	0	0

Last updated: 22 November 2026
Source: Competitions

=== Goals ===
As of 22 November 2026

Rank	No.	Pos	Nat	Player	Ligue 1	Tunisian Cup	CAF Champions League	Tunisian Super Cup	Total
1	27	FW	(Tunisia)	Hazem Mastouri	4	0	0	0	4
2	18	MF	(Tunisia)	Moez Hadj Ali	2	0	0	0	2
2	7	FW	(France)	Imad Faraj	1	0	1	0	2
4	20	MF	(Tunisia)	Mohamed Belhadj Mahmoud	1	0	0	0	1
4	29	FW	(Cameroon)	Maël Fernandez	1	0	0	0	1
4	11	FW	(Algeria)	Youcef Belaïli	1	0	0	0	1
4	4	DF	(Tunisia)	Marouane Sahraoui	1	0	0	0	1
Total					11	0	1	0	12

=== Assists ===
As of 22 November 2026

Rank	No.	Pos	Nat	Player	Ligue 1	Tunisian Cup	CAF Champions League	Tunisian Super Cup	Total
1	10	FW	(Brazil)	Lucas Ribeiro	2	0	0	0	2
1	7	FW	(France)	Imad Faraj	2	0	0	0	2
3	19	FW	(Tunisia)	Achref Jabri	1	0	0	0	1
3	21	MF	(Ivory Coast)	Abdramane Konaté	1	0	0	0	1
3	18	MF	(Tunisia)	Moez Hadj Ali	1	0	0	0	1
3	11	FW	(Algeria)	Youcef Belaïli	1	0	0	0	1
3	16	MF	(Peru)	Jesús Castillo	0	0	1	0	1
Total					8	0	1	0	9

=== Cleansheets ===
As of 22 November 2026

Rank	No.	Nat	Player	Ligue 1	Tunisian Cup	CAF Champions League	Tunisian Super Cup	Total
1	32	(Tunisia)	Bechir Ben Saïd	3	0	1	0	4
2	22	(Tunisia)	Montasser Essid	1	0	0	0	1
Total				4	0	1	0	5

=== Disciplinary record ===
N	P	Nat.	Name	Ligue 1			Tunisian Cup			CAF Champions League			Tunisian Super Cup			Total			Notes
N	P	Nat.	Name	Yellow card	Second yellow card	Red card	Yellow card	Second yellow card	Red card	Yellow card	Second yellow card	Red card	Yellow card	Second yellow card	Red card	Yellow card	Second yellow card	Red card	Notes
2	DF	(Tunisia)	Mohamed Ben Ali	1		1										1		1	
11	FW	(Algeria)	Youcef Belaïli	1						1	1					2	1		
20	MF	(Tunisia)	Mohamed Belhadj Mahmoud	3						1						4			
6	DF	(Tunisia)	Hamza Jelassi	2						2						4			
21	MF	(Ivory Coast)	Abdramane Konaté	2												2			
18	MF	(Tunisia)	Moez Hadj Ali	2												2			
8	MF	(Tunisia)	Hamza Rafia	1						1						2			
1	GK	(Tunisia)	Amenallah Memmiche	1												1			
29	FW	(Cameroon)	Maël Fernandez	1												1			
22	GK	(Tunisia)	Montasser Essid	1												1			
4	DF	(Tunisia)	Marouane Sahraoui	1												1			
27	FW	(Tunisia)	Hazem Mastouri							1						1			
12	DF	(Tunisia)	Nidhal Laifi							1						1			
25	DF	(Tunisia)	Raed Chikhaoui	1												1			
10	FW	(Brazil)	Lucas Ribeiro	1												1			
9	FW	(France)	Florian Danho	1												1			

Last updated: 22 November 2026
Source: Competitions
Ordered by (red card) , (second yellow card) and (yellow card)
(yellow card) = Number of bookings; (second yellow card) = Number of sending offs after a second yellow card; (red card) = Number of sending offs by a direct red card.

== Milestones ==
=== Debuts ===
The following players made their competitive debuts for the first team during the campaign.

Legend

– Indicates youth academy debut.

Date	No.	Pos.	Nat.	Player	Age	Final score	Opponent	Competition
23 August 2026	4	DF	(Tunisia)	Marouane Sahraoui	30	3–2 (H)	Étoile du Sahel	Tunisian Ligue Professionnelle 1
23 August 2026	7	FW	(France)	Imad Faraj	27	3–2 (H)	Étoile du Sahel	Tunisian Ligue Professionnelle 1
23 August 2026	16	MF	(Peru)	Jesús Castillo	25	3–2 (H)	Étoile du Sahel	Tunisian Ligue Professionnelle 1
23 August 2026	20	MF	(Tunisia)	Mohamed Belhadj Mahmoud	26	3–2 (H)	Étoile du Sahel	Tunisian Ligue Professionnelle 1
23 August 2026	25	DF	(Tunisia)	Raed Chikhaoui	22	3–2 (H)	Étoile du Sahel	Tunisian Ligue Professionnelle 1
23 August 2026	29	FW	(Cameroon)	Maël Fernandez	19	3–2 (H)	Étoile du Sahel	Tunisian Ligue Professionnelle 1
23 August 2026	24	FW	(Tunisia)	Youssef Becha	21	3–2 (H)	Étoile du Sahel	Tunisian Ligue Professionnelle 1
30 August 2026	27	FW	(Tunisia)	Hazem Mastouri	29	3–1 (A)	JS El Omrane	Tunisian Ligue Professionnelle 1
6 September 2026	10	FW	(Brazil)	Lucas Ribeiro	27	2–1 (H)	AS Marsa	Tunisian Ligue Professionnelle 1
13 September 2026	22	GK	(Tunisia)	Montasser Essid	26	0–1 (A)	CS Hammam-Lif	Tunisian Ligue Professionnelle 1
24 October 2026	28	DF	(Algeria)	Adem Alilet	27	1–0 (3–1 p) (H)	(Libya) Asswehly	CAF Champions League

(H) — Home; (A) — Away; (N) — Neutral

=== First goals ===
The following players scored their first goals for Espérance de Tunis first team during the campaign.

Date	No.	Pos.	Nat.	Player	Age	Score	Final score	Opponent	Competition
23 August 2026	20	MF	(Tunisia)	Mohamed Belhadj Mahmoud	26	1–0 (H)	3–2 (H)	Étoile du Sahel	Tunisian Ligue Professionnelle 1
23 August 2026	18	MF	(Tunisia)	Moez Hadj Ali	27	2–2 (H)	3–2 (H)	Étoile du Sahel	Tunisian Ligue Professionnelle 1
30 August 2026	27	FW	(Tunisia)	Hazem Mastouri	29	3–1 (A)	3–1 (A)	JS El Omrane	Tunisian Ligue Professionnelle 1
6 September 2026	29	FW	(Cameroon)	Maël Fernandez	19	1–0 (H)	2–1 (H)	AS Marsa	Tunisian Ligue Professionnelle 1
13 September 2026	4	DF	(Tunisia)	Marouane Sahraoui	30	0–1 (A)	0–1 (A)	CS Hammam-Lif	Tunisian Ligue Professionnelle 1
24 October 2026	7	FW	(France)	Imad Faraj	27	1–0 (H)	1–0 (3–1 p) (H)	(Libya) Asswehly	CAF Champions League

(H) — Home; (A) — Away; (N) — Neutral
