= 2026–27 Tunisian Ligue Professionnelle 1 =

Tunisian Ligue Professionnelle 1
- Season: 2026–27
- Dates: 22 August 2026 – 2027
- Matches: 63
- Goals: 121 (1.92 per match)
- Top goalscorer: Hamdi Labidi; Hazem Mastouri (4 goals each)
- Biggest home win: AS Marsa 3–0 ES Métlaoui (18 October 2026)
- Biggest away win: ES Hammam Sousse 1–3 Stade Tunisien (12 September 2026); ES Hammam Sousse 0–2 US Ben Guerdane (17 October 2026)
- Highest scoring: US Monastir 3–3 US Ben Guerdane (12 September 2026)
- Longest winning run: Stade Tunisien (4 matches)
- Longest unbeaten run: US Ben Guerdane (7 matches)
- Longest winless run: ES Hammam Sousse; Olympique Béja (8 matches each)
- Longest losing run: ES Hammam Sousse (6 matches)
- All statistics correct as of 22 November 2026.

The 2026–27 Tunisian Ligue Professionnelle 1 (Tunisian Professional League) season is the 72nd season of top-tier football in Tunisia.

== Teams ==
16 teams are contesting the league.

Locations of the 2026–27 season teams.

Team	Manager	Location	Stadium	Capacity
AS Marsa	(Tunisia) Imed Ben Younes	Tunis (La Marsa)	Abdelaziz Chtioui Stadium	6,500
Club Africain	(Tunisia) Maher Kanzari	Tunis (Bab Jedid)	Hammadi Agrebi Stadium	65,000
CA Bizertin	(Tunisia) Mohamed Azaiez	Bizerte	15 October Stadium	20,000
CS Hammam-Lif	(Tunisia) Chamseddine Dhaouadi	Tunis (Hammam-Lif)	Bou Kornine Stadium	15,000
CS Sfaxien	~~(Tunisia) Nabil Kouki~~ (Tunisia) Mohamed Kouki	Sfax	Taieb Mhiri Stadium	12,600
ES Hammam Sousse	~~(Tunisia) Mohamed Ali Nafkha~~; ~~(Tunisia) Youssef Mouihbi~~; ~~(Tunisia) Ferid Chouchane~~ (Tunisia) Chiheb Ellili	Sousse (Hammam Sousse)	Bou Ali Lahouar Stadium	6,500
ES Métlaoui	(Tunisia) Amine Gara	Métlaoui	Métlaoui Municipal Stadium	4,000
Étoile du Sahel	(France) Christian Bracconi	Sousse	Sousse Olympic Stadium	40,000
Espérance de Tunis	~~(Romania) Laurențiu Reghecampf~~ (Spain) Pablo Franco	Tunis (Bab Souika)	Hammadi Agrebi Stadium	65,000
ES Zarzis	~~(Tunisia) Moncef Mcharek~~ (Tunisia) Chokri Khatoui	Zarzis	Abdessalam Kazouz Stadium	10,000
JS El Omrane	(Tunisia) Amine Beji	Tunis (El Omrane)	Chedly Zouiten Stadium	18,000
Olympique Béja	~~(Tunisia) Lassaad Maamar~~ (Tunisia) Nacif Beyaoui	Béja	Boujemaa Kmiti Stadium	15,000
PS Sakiet Eddaïer	(Tunisia) Yousri Ben Kahla	Sfax (Sakiet Eddaïer)	Taieb Mhiri Stadium	12,600
Stade Tunisien	(Portugal) Tozé Marreco	Tunis (Le Bardo)	Hédi Enneifer Stadium	11,000
US Ben Guerdane	(Tunisia) Sofiène Hidoussi	Ben Guerdane	7 March Stadium	10,000
US Monastir	(France) Romain Folz	Monastir	Mustapha Ben Jannet Stadium	20,000

== Competition ==
=== Table ===
Pos	Team	Pld	W	D	L	GF	GA	GD	Pts	Qualification or relegation
1	US Ben Guerdane	8	5	2	1	12	7	+5	17	Qualification for the Champions League
2	Espérance de Tunis	8	5	2	1	11	7	+4	17	Qualification for the Champions League
3	Stade Tunisien	8	5	1	2	11	7	+4	16	Qualification for the Confederation Cup
4	US Monastir	8	4	3	1	10	6	+4	15	
5	Club Africain	8	4	2	2	8	6	+2	14	
6	CS Sfaxien	8	3	4	1	9	6	+3	13	
7	PS Sakiet Eddaïer	8	3	4	1	5	2	+3	13	
8	CA Bizertin	8	3	2	3	8	8	0	11	
9	JS El Omrane	8	2	4	2	7	7	0	10	
10	ES Zarzis	8	3	0	5	7	8	−1	9	
11	ES Métlaoui	8	3	0	5	8	10	−2	9	
12	Étoile du Sahel	7	2	2	3	8	10	−2	8	
13	AS Marsa	7	1	4	2	6	5	+1	7	
14	CS Hammam-Lif	8	1	2	5	3	9	−6	5	Relegation to Ligue 2
15	Olympique Béja	8	0	4	4	6	11	−5	4	Relegation to Ligue 2
16	ES Hammam Sousse	8	0	2	6	2	12	−10	2	Relegation to Ligue 2

Updated to match(es) played on 22 November 2026. Source: Flashscore
Rules for classification: 1) points; 2) head-to-head points; 3) head-to-head goal difference; 4) goal difference; 5) total goals; 6) fairplay ranking; 7) playoff.

=== Results ===
Home \ Away	ASM	CA	CAB	CSHL	CSS	ESHS	ESM	ESS	EST	ESZ	JSO	OB	PSS	ST	USBG	USM
AS Marsa				1–1			3–0						0–0			
Club Africain			3–2			1–0			0–0	1–0						
CA Bizertin	1–0					3–1						1–1				0–0
CS Hammam-Lif			0–1				0–3		0–1		1–1					
CS Sfaxien			2–0						0–0	2–1	2–1					
ES Hammam Sousse													0–0	1–3	0–2	0–0
ES Métlaoui		0–1				1–0				2–1				1–2		
Étoile du Sahel				0–1	1–1		2–1		a		1–1					
Espérance de Tunis	2–1	a						3–2				3–1				1–0
ES Zarzis						2–0						1–0			1–0	1–2
JS El Omrane	0–0						1–0		3–1			0–0				
Olympique Béja	1–1							1–2					1–1		1–2	
PS Sakiet Eddaïer		0–0		1–0	1–0						2–0					
Stade Tunisien		2–1	1–0		1–1					1–0						
US Ben Guerdane		2–1		1–0	1–1									1–0		
US Monastir								2–0					1–0	2–1	3–3	

Updated to match(es) played on 22 November 2026. Source: Tunisian Football Federation
Legend: Blue = home team win; Yellow = draw; Red = away team win.
For upcoming matches, an "a" indicates there is an article about the rivalry between the two participants.

=== Clubs season-progress ===
Team ╲ Round	1	2	3	4	5	6	7	8	9	10	11	12	13	14	15	16	17	18	19	20	21	22	23	24	25	26	27	28	29	30
AS Marsa	L	D	L		D	W	D	D																						
Club Africain	W	W	L	W	L	W	D	D																						
CA Bizertin	W	W	D	L	D	L	W	L																						
CS Hammam-Lif	L	L	L	L	W	D	D	L																						
CS Sfaxien	D	W	D	W	L	D	D	W																						
ES Hammam Sousse	D	L	L	L	L	L	L	D																						
ES Métlaoui	L	L	W	L	L	L	W	W																						
Étoile du Sahel	L	W	D		L	W	D	L																						
Espérance de Tunis	W	L	W	W	W	D	W	D																						
ES Zarzis	W	L	L	L	W	L	L	W																						
JS El Omrane	L	W	D	W	D	D	D	L																						
Olympique Béja	L	L	D	D	L	L	D	D																						
PS Sakiet Eddaïer	W	D	W	D	W	L	D	D																						
Stade Tunisien	D	L	W	W	W	W	L	W																						
US Ben Guerdane	W	W	D	D	W	W	W	L																						
US Monastir	D	W	W	D	D	W	L	W																						

Updated to match(es) played on 22 November 2026. Source: Tunisian Football Federation
W = Win; D = Draw; L = Lose

=== Positions by round ===
Team ╲ Round	1	2	3	4	5	6	7	8	9	10	11	12	13	14	15	16	17	18	19	20	21	22	23	24	25	26	27	28	29	30
AS Marsa	12	12	14	11																										
Club Africain	3	2																												
CA Bizertin	4	3																												
CS Hammam-Lif	13	16	16	16																										
CS Sfaxien	7	5																												
ES Hammam Sousse	9	13	15	15																										
ES Métlaoui	14	14		12																										
Étoile du Sahel	11	7		10																										
Espérance de Tunis	2	10																												
ES Zarzis	5	9		13																										
JS El Omrane	16	8																												
Olympique Béja	15	15	13	14																										
PS Sakiet Eddaïer	1	4																												
Stade Tunisien	8	11																												
US Ben Guerdane	6	1																												
US Monastir	10	6																												

Leader
2027–28 CAF Champions League
2027–28 CAF Confederation Cup
Relegation to Ligue 2

Updated to match(es) played on 20 September 2026. Source: Tunisian Football Federation

=== Goals scored per round ===
As of 22 November 2026

== Season statistics ==
=== Top goalscorers ===
As of 22 November 2026

Rank	Goalscorer	Club	Goals
1	(Tunisia) Hazem Mastouri	EST	4
1	(Tunisia) Hamdi Labidi	ESZ	4
3	(Tunisia) Nour Mani	ASM	3
3	(Tunisia) Sadok Kadida	CA	3
3	(Tunisia) Oussama Naffati	ESM	3
3	(Tunisia) Oussama Abid	ESS	3
3	(Tunisia) Achraf Ben Dhiaf	ESS	3
3	(Tunisia) Ouday Belhadj	JSO	3
3	(Tunisia) Fakhreddine Ben Youssef	ST	3
3	(Tunisia) Ghazi Ayadi	USBG	3
3	(Tunisia) Raed Bouchniba	USM	3
3	(Tunisia) Ahmed Bouassida	USM	3

=== Scoring ===
- First goal of the season:
  (Tunisia) Zied Aloui for PS Sakiet Eddaïer against JS El Omrane (22 August 2026)

== Number of teams by Governorate ==
Position	Governorate	Number	Teams
1	Tunis	5	AS Marsa, Club Africain, Espérance de Tunis, JS El Omrane, Stade Tunisien
2	Medenine	2	ES Zarzis, US Ben Guerdane
2	Sfax	2	CS Sfaxien, PS Sakiet Eddaïer
2	Sousse	2	ES Hammam Sousse, Étoile du Sahel
5	Ben Arous	1	CS Hammam-Lif
5	Béja	1	Olympique Béja
5	Bizerte	1	CA Bizertin
5	Gafsa	1	ES Métlaoui
5	Monastir	1	US Monastir

== See also ==
- 2026–27 Tunisian Cup
