= List of football stadiums in Tunisia =

The following is a list of football stadiums in Tunisia, with a capacity of at least 1,000 spectators. Some stadiums are also used for other purposes like athletics, concerts, politics and cultural events.

== Current stadiums ==
Image	Stadium	Capacity	City	Home team(s)	Opened
	Hammadi Agrebi Stadium	65,000	Radès	National team, Esperance de Tunis, Club Africain	2001
	Sousse Olympic Stadium	40,000	Sousse	Étoile du Sahel	1973
	Mustapha Ben Jannet Stadium	20,000	Monastir	US Monastir	1958
	15 October Stadium	20,000	Bizerte	CA Bizertin	1990
	Chedly Zouiten Stadium	18,000	Tunis	JS El Omrane	1942
	Ali Zouaoui Stadium	15,000	Kairouan	JS Kairouan	1999
	Boujemaa Kmiti Stadium	15,000	Béja	Olympique Béja	1983
	Bou Kornine Stadium	15,000	Hammam-Lif	CS Hammam-Lif	n/a
	Taieb Mhiri Stadium	12,600	Sfax	CS Sfaxien	1938
	Hédi Enneifer Stadium	11,000	Le Bardo	Stade Tunisien	2011
	Gabès Municipal Stadium	10,000	Gabès	Stade Gabèsien, AS Gabès	n/a
	7 March Stadium	10,000	Ben Guerdane	US Ben Guerdane	2000
	Abdessalam Kazouz Stadium	10,000	Zarzis	ES Zarzis	2003
	EL Kef Stadium	9,000	El Kef	Olympique du Kef	n/a
	Midoun Municipal Stadium	8,000	Midoun	ES Jerba	n/a
	Jendouba Municipal Stadium	8,000	Jendouba	Jendouba Sport	1992
	Kasserine Municipal Stadium	8,000	Kasserine	AS Kasserine	n/a
	Mohamed Rouached Stadium	7,000	Gafsa	EGS Gafsa	1995
	Ariana Municipal Stadium	7,000	Ariana	AS d'Ariana	1991
	Bou Ali Lahouar Stadium	6,500	Sousse	ES Hammam Sousse	1960
	Azaiez Jaballah Stadium	6,500	Menzel Bourguiba	SA Menzel Bourguiba	n/a
	Abdelaziz Chtioui Stadium	6,000	La Marsa	AS Marsa	n/a
	Houmt Souk Stadium	6,000	Djerba	AS Djerba	n/a
	Medenine Olympic Stadium	6,000	Medenine	CO Médenine	n/a
	Hédi Ben Romdhane Stadium	5,000	Radès	ES Radès	n/a
	Habib Tajouri Stadium	5,000	Béni Khalled	ES Beni-Khalled	n/a
	Néjib Khattab Stadium	5,000	Tataouine	US Tataouine	1996
	Métlaoui Municipal Stadium	5,000	Métlaoui	ES Métlaoui	n/a
	Hamda Laouani Stadium	4,500	Kairouan	JS Kairouan	1999
	Ameur El-Gargouri Stadium	4,000	Sfax	Sfax RS	n/a
	2 March Stadium	4,000	Sfax	Sfax RS	n/a
	Ben Arous Stadium	4,000	Ben Arous	SC Ben Arous	n/a
	Tozeur Stadium	4,000	Tozeur	LPS Tozeur	n/a
	Chebba Stadium	3,000	Chebba	CS Chebba	n/a
	Jebiniana Municipal Stadium	3,000	Jebiniana	CS Jebiniana	n/a
	Soliman Municipal Stadium	3,000	Soliman	AS Soliman	n/a
	Farhat Hached Stadium	2,000	Kerkennah	OC Kerkennah	n/a
	Ahmed Bsiri Stadium	2,000	Bizerte	SS Zarzouna	1985
	Nabeul Stadium	2,000	Nabeul	Stade Nabeulien	n/a
	Hammamet Municipal stadium	2,000	Hammamet	FC Hammamet	n/a
	Rejiche Municipal Stadium	1,000	Rejiche	AS Rejiche	n/a

== Under renovation ==
Stadium	Capacity	City	Opened	Status	Opening
El Menzah Stadium	40,000	Tunis	1967	Under construction	TBD

== See also ==
- List of African stadiums by capacity
- List of stadiums by capacity
- Lists of stadiums
