= All-time Tunisian Ligue Professionnelle 1 table =

The all-time table of the Tunisian Ligue Professionnelle 1 is a ranking which aims to determine which team in the history of the Tunisian football championship has had the most success, not by the number of titles but by the number of points.

This ranking combines all the points and goals of each team that has played in the Tunisian championship since independence in 1956 until the end of the 2025–26 season.

== General classification ==
Pos	Team	S	GP	W	D	L	GF	GA	Pts
1	Espérance de Tunis	71	1796	1040	494	262	2982	1316	4178
2	Club Africain	71	1796	885	579	332	2448	1362	3772
3	Étoile du Sahel	69	1754	907	498	349	2572	1411	3735
4	CS Sfaxien	71	1796	747	576	473	2222	1679	3403
5	Stade Tunisien	70	1738	646	545	547	2036	1747	3051
6	CA Bizertin	69	1737	585	553	599	1775	1777	2902
7	CS Hammam-Lif	59	1480	439	449	592	1485	1745	2357
8	AS Marsa	56	1414	450	434	530	1526	1614	2353
9	US Monastir	52	1316	388	451	477	1262	1417	2110
10	Sfax railway sport	34	864	260	291	313	878	977	1642
11	JS Kairouan	41	1070	318	313	439	1034	1270	1593
12	CO Transports	28	708	205	226	277	683	849	1264
13	Olympique Béja	35	880	248	268	364	778	992	1172
14	ES Zarzis	25	640	167	200	273	531	733	720
15	Stade Gabèsien	15	384	90	111	183	308	541	521
16	OC Kerkennah	13	338	73	113	152	269	429	513
17	Stade Soussien	12	282	74	80	128	271	371	485
18	US Tunis	10	236	75	69	92	341	343	455
19	ES Métlaoui	13	348	108	108	132	309	380	440
20	EGS Gafsa	15	396	99	114	183	374	528	431
21	Olympique du Kef	13	328	72	92	164	264	476	421
22	CS Cheminots	9	228	47	71	110	193	330	397
23	El Makarem de Mahdia	9	222	48	75	99	163	290	393
24	US Ben Guerdane	11	296	89	93	114	243	290	368
25	SS Sfaxien	7	182	33	48	101	151	300	296
26	AS Gabès	10	278	54	77	147	206	384	260
27	AS Kasserine	7	186	46	49	91	138	268	256
28	AS Soliman	7	178	52	43	83	145	206	201
29	ES Hammam Sousse	8	192	42	68	82	159	236	194
30	JS Metouia	4	100	26	36	38	158	193	188
31	US Tataouine	7	177	44	51	82	148	258	187
32	Stade populaire	4	98	26	29	43	126	158	179
33	US Maghrébine	4	100	20	33	47	79	147	173
34	El Ahly Mateur	4	88	19	15	54	75	204	141
35	SA Menzel Bourguiba	3	72	27	12	33	124	156	138
36	USM Olympique	3	72	16	13	43	104	202	117
37	PFC Bizertin	3	72	14	14	44	81	169	114
38	AS Oued Ellil	2	52	12	11	29	40	72	99
39	ES Beni-Khalled	5	142	22	36	84	94	228	98
40	AS Rejiche	4	81	24	26	31	72	78	98
41	AS Megrine	2	52	9	16	27	42	88	86
42	CO Médenine	4	102	21	21	60	72	170	84
43	EO La Goulette Kram	3	78	17	28	33	53	85	79
44	Stade Africain Menzel Bourguiba	2	52	8	10	34	48	87	78
45	Jendouba Sport	3	78	14	30	34	45	78	72
46	Patriote de Sousse	2	48	4	11	33	42	133	67
47	JS El Omrane	2	60	14	20	26	49	79	62
48	Olympique Sidi Bouzid	2	54	16	10	28	46	69	58
49	CS Chebba	3	54	13	15	26	47	60	54
50	AS Djerba	3	74	14	12	48	68	134	54
51	CS Menzel Bouzelfa	1	26	3	13	10	21	31	45
52	LPS Tozeur	1	40	10	14	16	36	46	44
53	STIA Sousse	1	26	5	7	14	17	31	43
54	AS Ariana	1	26	5	6	15	26	44	42
55	CS Korba	1	26	3	6	17	14	47	38
56	FC Jerissa	1	24	3	5	16	13	48	35
57	PS Sakiet Eddaïer	0	0	0	0	0	0	0	0

Tunisian Ligue Professionnelle 1
Tunisian Ligue Professionnelle 2
Tunisian Ligue 3
Tunisian Ligue 4
Tunisian Ligue 5
Defunct clubs
