= 2026–27 Tunisian Ligue Professionnelle 2 =

Tunisian Ligue Professionnelle 2
- Season: 2026–27
- Dates: 19 September 2026 – May 2027
- Matches: 111
- Goals: 234 (2.11 per match)
- Biggest home win: Association Mégrine Sport 4–0 Astre sportif d'Agareb
- Biggest away win: Astre sportif d'Agareb 0–3 SC Ben Arous; SC Moknine 0–3 CS Redeyef
- Highest scoring: AS Soliman 4–1 US Tataouine (5 goals); AS Soliman 2–3 Association Mégrine Sport (5 goals); Olympique du Kef 3–2 EGS Gafsa (5 goals); EM Mahdia 3–2 US Tataouine (5 goals); US Tataouine 3–2 CS M'saken (5 goals)
- Longest winning run: 5 games (AS Kasserine)
- Longest unbeaten run: 7 games (US Ksour Essef)
- Longest winless run: 8 games (SC Moknine)
- Longest losing run: 4 games (CO Médenine)
- All statistics correct as of 15 November 2026.

The 2026–27 Tunisian Ligue Professionnelle 2 is the 72nd season of the Tunisian Ligue Professionnelle 2, the second tier of football in Tunisia. The season began on 19 September 2026 and is scheduled to end in May 2027. The league is contested by 28 teams divided into two groups of 14.

== Team changes ==
The following teams changed division since the 2025–26 season.

=== To Ligue Professionnelle 2 ===
Relegated from Ligue Professionnelle 1

- AS Soliman
- AS Gabès
- JS Kairouanaise

Promoted from Ligue Professionnelle 3

- ES Béni Khalled
- Stade soussien
- Olympique du Kef
- Club olympique de Médenine

=== From Ligue Professionnelle 2 ===
Promoted to Ligue Professionnelle 1

- PS Sakiet Eddaïer
- ES Hammam Sousse
- CS Hammam Lif

Relegated to Ligue Professionnelle 3

- US Sbeïtla
- AS Oued Ellil
- CS Makthar
- US Siliana

== Participants ==
The 28 teams are divided into two groups of 14.

Group A

- AS Soliman R
- AS Gabès R
- US Tataouine
- Sfax RS
- SC Ben Arous
- OC Kerkennah
- CS Chebbien
- CS M'saken
- Baath sportif de Bou Hajla
- Association Mégrine Sport
- EM Mahdia
- Astre sportif d'Agareb
- ES Beni-Khalled P
- Stade soussien P

Group B

- JS Kairouanaise R
- Stade gabesien
- AS Kasserine
- Jendouba Sport
- CS Korba
- ES Bouchemma
- AS Ariana
- US Ksour Essef
- CS Redeyef
- Kalâa Sport
- SC Moknine
- Olympique du Kef P
- CO Médenine P
- EGS Gafsa

Notes:

- R : Relegated from Ligue Professionnelle 1
- P : Promoted from Ligue Professionnelle 3

== Competition format ==
The season is played as a regular double round-robin, with each team playing 26 matches. The winner of each group is promoted directly to the Ligue Professionnelle 1. The runners-up and third-placed teams from each group enter a promotion play-off for the third promotion spot. The bottom two teams from each group are relegated to the Ligue Professionnelle 3.

== League tables ==
=== Group A ===
Pos	Team	Pld	W	D	L	GF	GA	GD	Pts	Qualification or relegation
1	EM Mahdia	8	5	2	1	14	8	+6	17	Promotion to Ligue Professionnelle 1
2	CS Chebbien	8	5	1	2	9	7	+2	16	Qualification for promotion play-off
3	AS Soliman R	8	4	3	1	14	8	+6	15	Qualification for promotion play-off
4	Association Mégrine Sport	8	4	2	2	13	8	+5	14	
5	CS M'saken	8	4	2	2	12	8	+4	14	
6	Stade soussien P	8	3	2	3	8	7	+1	11	
7	Sfax RS	8	2	5	1	6	5	+1	11	
8	US Tataouine	8	3	2	3	13	15	−2	11	
9	SC Ben Arous	8	2	3	3	7	6	+1	9	
10	Baath sportif de Bou Hajla	8	2	2	4	4	10	−6	8	
11	Astre sportif d'Agareb	8	1	4	3	7	14	−7	7	
12	OC Kerkennah	8	1	3	4	6	9	−3	6	
13	ES Beni-Khalled P	8	1	3	4	4	8	−4	6	Relegation to Ligue Professionnelle 3
14	AS Gabès R	8	1	2	5	5	9	−4	5	Relegation to Ligue Professionnelle 3

Updated to match(es) played on 15 November 2026. Source: Flashscore

=== Group B ===
Pos	Team	Pld	W	D	L	GF	GA	GD	Pts	Qualification or relegation
1	AS Kasserine	8	6	0	2	12	6	+6	18	Promotion to Ligue Professionnelle 1
2	US Ksour Essef	7	5	2	0	8	1	+7	17	Qualification for promotion play-off
3	CS Korba	8	4	3	1	11	5	+6	15	Qualification for promotion play-off
4	EGS Gafsa	8	4	1	3	12	9	+3	13	
5	Jendouba Sport	8	3	4	1	6	4	+2	13	
6	ES Bouchemma	8	4	1	3	8	12	−4	13	
7	AS Ariana	8	3	2	3	9	7	+2	11	
8	Kalâa Sport	8	3	2	3	9	8	+1	11	
9	JS Kairouanaise R	8	3	2	3	5	6	−1	11	
10	Olympique du Kef P	8	2	2	4	9	10	−1	8	
11	Stade Gabésien	8	1	5	2	6	7	−1	8	
12	CS Redeyef	7	2	0	5	7	7	0	6	
13	CO Médenine P	8	1	2	5	6	15	−9	5	Relegation to Ligue Professionnelle 3
14	SC Moknine	8	0	2	6	4	15	−11	2	Relegation to Ligue Professionnelle 3

Updated to match(es) played on 15 November 2026. Source: Flashscore

Notes:

- R : Relegated from Ligue Professionnelle 1
- P : Promoted from Ligue Professionnelle 3

=== Results ===
==== Group A ====
Home \ Away	EMM	MEG	SRS	MSK	SOL	SBA	STS	CHB	TAT	BSB	BEN	ASA	GAB	OCK
EM Mahdia	—	2–0		2–2					3–2					2–1
Association Mégrine Sport		—					2–0				1–1	4–0		1–1
Sfax RS	1–0		—		2–2	0–0							0–0	
CS M'saken				—	0–1			0–0			2–0		2–1	
AS Soliman		2–3			—			3–1	4–1		1–0			
SC Ben Arous	1–2	1–0				—		0–1	2–2					
Stade soussien			1–0				—			3–0		2–2	1–0	
CS Chebbien			1–2				1–0	—			1–0			2–1
US Tataouine				3–2			1–0		—			2–2		1–0
Baath sportif de Bou Hajla	0–2				0–0	0–0			2–1	—				
ES Beni-Khalled			0–0				1–1			1–2	—		1–0	
Astre sportif d'Agareb	1–1			0–2		0–3				2–0		—		
AS Gabès		1–2			1–1	1–0		1–2					—	
OC Kerkennah			1–1	1–2						1–0		0–0		—

Updated to match(es) played on 15 November 2026. Source: Flashscore
Legend: Blue = home team win; Yellow = draw; Red = away team win.

==== Group B ====
Home \ Away	RED	KAL	KOR	EGS	JSK	ASK	STG	KSE	JEN	BOU	ARI	OKE	MOK	MED
CS Redeyef	—		0–1						0–1	3–0				
Kalâa Sport	2–1	—			0–1				1–1				3–0	
CS Korba			—	3–0	2–0							2–1		0–0
EGS Gafsa				—		2–0 (Note: The match originally won by AS Kasserine (2-1) was awarded 2-0 to EGS Gafsa by decision of the LNFP, due to the participation of an ineligible player (Bilel Fakraoui). See "Ligue 2 : L'AS Kasserine perd sur tapis vert". footballtunisien.com (in French). October 2026..)				3–1	1–0			3–0
JS Kairouanaise				1–0	—			0–1	1–0					2–2
AS Kasserine	2–0				1–0	—						1–0	2–1	
Stade Gabésien	1–0	1–1	2–2				—						0–0	
US Ksour Essef							1–0	—		3–0	0–0			1–0
Jendouba Sport			1–1				0–0		—	1–1	1–0			
ES Bouchemma		1–0	1–0			2–1	2–1			—				
AS Ariana		2–0				1–2	1–1				—	2–1		
Olympique du Kef				3–2	0–0			0–0				—	3–1	
SC Moknine	0–3			1–1				1–2	0–1				—	
CO Médenine		1–2				0–3					1–3	2–1		—

Updated to match(es) played on 15 November 2026. Source: Flashscore
Legend: Blue = home team win; Yellow = draw; Red = away team win.

== Promotion play-offs ==
The runners-up and third-placed teams from each group enter a play-off to determine the third promoted team. The semi-finals are played over one match on the home ground of the better-ranked team, and the final is played at a neutral venue. The winner of the final is promoted to the Ligue Professionnelle 1.

== Super champion final ==
A match is played between the winners of the two groups (both already promoted) to determine the Ligue Professionnelle 2 super champion. It is played at a neutral venue.
