= 2025–26 Tunisian Ligue Professionnelle 1 =

Tunisian Ligue Professionnelle 1
- Season: 2025–26
- Dates: 9 August 2025 – 14 May 2026
- Champions: Club Africain (14th title)
- Relegated: JS Kairouan; AS Soliman; AS Gabès
- Champions League: Club Africain; Espérance de Tunis
- Confederation Cup: CS Sfaxien; ES Zarzis
- Matches: 240
- Goals: 415 (1.73 per match)
- Top goalscorer: Firas Chaouat (15 goals)
- Biggest home win: Club Africain 5–0 ES Métlaoui (1 March 2026)
- Biggest away win: Olympique Béja 0–6 AS Marsa (4 October 2025)
- Highest scoring: Olympique Béja 0–6 AS Marsa (4 October 2025)
- Longest winning run: CS Sfaxien (6 matches)
- Longest unbeaten run: Club Africain (23 matches)
- Longest winless run: AS Soliman (14 matches)
- Longest losing run: JS Kairouan (6 matches)

The 2025–26 Tunisian Ligue Professionnelle 1 (Tunisian Professional League) season was the 71st season of top-tier football in Tunisia.

On 10 May 2026, Club Africain secured their fourteenth league title with one game to spare after a dramatic victory over their rivals and closest challengers, Espérance de Tunis, thanks to a goal scored in the final minute of the match.

== Teams ==
16 teams contested the league.

=== Changes ===
▲ from 2024–25 Ligue Professionnelle 2	▼ to 2025–26 Ligue Professionnelle 2
AS Marsa; JS Kairouan	EGS Gafsa; US Tataouine

=== Location and stadiums ===
Locations of the 2025–26 Ligue 1 teams

Team	Location	Stadium	Capacity
AS Gabès	Gabès	Gabès Municipal Stadium	15,000
AS Marsa	Tunis (La Marsa)	Abdelaziz Chtioui Stadium	6,500
AS Soliman	Soliman	Soliman Municipal Stadium	3,000
Club Africain	Tunis (Bab Jedid)	Hammadi Agrebi Stadium	65,000
CA Bizertin	Bizerte	15 October Stadium	20,000
CS Sfaxien	Sfax	Taieb Mhiri Stadium	12,600
ES Métlaoui	Métlaoui	Métlaoui Municipal Stadium	4,000
Étoile du Sahel	Sousse	Sousse Olympic Stadium	40,000
Espérance de Tunis	Tunis (Bab Souika)	Hammadi Agrebi Stadium	65,000
ES Zarzis	Zarzis	Abdessalam Kazouz Stadium	10,000
JS Kairouan	Kairouan	Hamda Laouani Stadium	5,000
JS El Omrane	Tunis (El Omrane)	Chedly Zouiten Stadium	18,000
Olympique Béja	Béja	Boujemaa Kmiti Stadium	15,000
Stade Tunisien	Tunis (Le Bardo)	Hédi Enneifer Stadium	11,000
US Ben Guerdane	Ben Guerdane	7 March Stadium	10,000
US Monastir	Monastir	Mustapha Ben Jannet Stadium	20,000

== Competition ==
=== Table ===
Pos	Team	Pld	W	D	L	GF	GA	GD	Pts	Qualification or relegation
1	Club Africain (C)	30	19	9	2	43	10	+33	66	Qualification for the Champions League
2	Espérance de Tunis	30	18	9	3	45	11	+34	63	Qualification for the Champions League
3	CS Sfaxien	30	18	8	4	44	13	+31	62	Qualification for the Confederation Cup
4	Stade Tunisien	30	12	12	6	28	14	+14	48	
5	US Monastir	30	11	12	7	28	19	+9	45	
6	ES Zarzis	30	11	8	11	30	28	+2	41 (Note: Ranked on head-to-head goal difference: ES Zarzis +1, Étoile du Sahel –1.)	Qualification for the Confederation Cup
7	Étoile du Sahel	30	11	8	11	28	30	−2	41	
8	ES Métlaoui	30	9	13	8	19	25	−6	40	
9	JS El Omrane	30	10	6	14	24	33	−9	36	
10	US Ben Guerdane	30	8	11	11	18	22	−4	35 (Note: Ranked on goal difference: US Ben Guerdane –4, AS Marsa –7.)	
11	AS Marsa	30	11	2	17	26	33	−7	35	
12	CA Bizertin	30	8	9	13	18	29	−11	33	
13	Olympique Béja	30	9	5	16	18	39	−21	32	
14	JS Kairouan (R)	30	9	4	17	20	41	−21	31	Relegation to Ligue 2
15	AS Soliman (R)	30	6	9	15	15	31	−16	27	Relegation to Ligue 2
16	AS Gabès (R)	30	3	9	18	11	37	−26	18	Relegation to Ligue 2

Source: Tunisian Football Federation
Rules for classification: 1) points; 2) head-to-head points; 3) head-to-head goal difference; 4) goal difference; 5) total goals; 6) fairplay ranking; 7) playoff.
(C) Champions; (R) Relegated

=== Results ===
Home \ Away	ASG	ASM	ASS	CA	CAB	CSS	ESM	ESS	EST	ESZ	JSK	JSO	OB	ST	USBG	USM
AS Gabès		2–1	1–1	0–1	0–0	0–0	1–1	0–0	0–0	0–1	0–2	0–2	1–0	0–1	0–1	1–1
AS Marsa	1–0		1–0	0–1	2–0	0–3	0–1	0–2	0–3	1–0	1–2	2–1	1–0	0–4	1–0	0–0
AS Soliman	1–0	0–2		1–1	0–0	1–1	0–1	0–2	0–3	1–0	0–0	0–0	1–0	0–0	0–1	1–2
Club Africain	2–0	1–0	1–1		1–0	1–1	5–0	3–0	0–0	1–2	2–0	3–0	1–1	2–0	2–0	2–1
CA Bizertin	3–0	1–2	1–0	0–2 (Note: Club Africain were awarded a 2–0 win due to CA Bizertin fans riot.)		1–1	0–0	1–1	1–1	0–2	1–0	1–0	3–0	0–2	1–0	0–0
CS Sfaxien	1–0	2–0	2–0	1–1	4–0		2–0	3–1	1–2	1–2	3–0	2–0	2–0	1–0	2–1	0–0
ES Métlaoui	1–0	1–0	2–2	1–0	0–0	2–1		2–0	1–1	0–0	0–0	0–0	0–0	0–0	1–1	2–2
Étoile du Sahel	3–0	1–0	1–0	0–1	1–0	0–1	2–0		0–0	1–0	2–3	1–0	1–2	1–1	0–0	1–0
Espérance de Tunis	2–1	1–0	2–0	0–1	2–0	0–0	2–0	1–0		2–2	1–0	4–0	2–0	1–0	4–0	1–1
ES Zarzis	0–1	0–2 (Note: AS Marsa were awarded a 2–0 win due to ES Zarzis fans riot.)	1–3	0–0	3–0	0–2	1–0	3–1	0–0		1–1	1–0	2–0	0–0	1–1	0–1
JS Kairouan	2–1	2–1	1–0	1–3	1–2	0–3	0–1	1–2	0–4	1–4		1–0	1–0	0–1	0–1	1–0
JS El Omrane	2–1	2–2	0–1	0–3	1–0	1–0	2–1	3–1	0–1	2–1	2–0		0–1	0–0	2–1	0–0
Olympique Béja	0–0	0–6	1–0	0–1	1–0	0–1	1–0	3–1	0–3	0–3	0–0	2–1		1–2	2–2	1–0
Stade Tunisien	4–0	1–0	1–0	0–0	1–1	0–0	2–0	1–1	1–0	3–0	1–0	1–2	0–2 (Note: Olympique Béja were awarded a 2–0 win after Stade Tunisien fielded 5 foreign players at the same time.)		0–0	0–0
US Ben Guerdane	1–1	1–0	0–1	0–1	0–1	0–1	0–0	0–0	0–1	0–0	2–0	0–0	2–0	1–0		2–0
US Monastir	2–0	1–0	3–0	0–0	1–0	0–2 (Note: CS Sfaxien were awarded a 2–0 win due to US Monastir fans riot.)	0–1	1–1	2–1	3–0	2–0	2–1	2–0	1–1	0–0	

Source: Tunisian Football Federation
Legend: Blue = home team win; Yellow = draw; Red = away team win.
For upcoming matches, an "a" indicates there is an article about the rivalry between the two participants.

=== Clubs season-progress ===
Team ╲ Round	1	2	3	4	5	6	7	8	9	10	11	12	13	14	15	16	17	18	19	20	21	22	23	24	25	26	27	28	29	30
AS Gabès	D	D	W	L	L	L	D	L	L	D	L	D	L	D	L	L	W	L	D	W	D	L	L	L	L	D	L	L	L	L
AS Marsa	L	W	L	D	L	W	L	L	W	L	L	W	W	L	W	L	L	W	L	L	W	L	L	W	L	L	W	W	L	D
AS Soliman	L	L	D	L	W	L	L	W	D	L	D	D	L	D	L	D	D	L	L	L	L	L	W	L	D	W	D	W	W	L
Club Africain	W	W	L	W	D	W	L	W	W	W	W	D	D	D	W	W	W	D	W	D	W	W	W	W	D	W	D	W	W	D
CA Bizertin	D	D	L	L	W	W	L	W	D	L	L	W	L	D	L	D	L	W	L	W	D	D	W	W	D	D	L	L	L	L
CS Sfaxien	L	D	L	W	D	W	D	D	W	W	D	L	W	W	W	W	W	W	L	D	W	W	W	W	D	W	D	W	W	W
ES Métlaoui	D	W	W	L	D	L	W	L	D	W	W	L	D	D	W	D	D	L	D	L	D	L	D	D	W	D	W	W	L	D
Étoile du Sahel	L	L	D	W	D	L	W	D	L	L	W	W	W	D	L	W	L	D	D	W	W	W	D	D	L	W	L	L	W	L
Espérance de Tunis	D	D	W	W	L	W	W	W	W	D	W	W	W	D	W	W	L	W	W	W	D	W	W	D	D	D	D	W	L	W
ES Zarzis	W	W	W	D	W	L	W	L	L	D	W	L	L	D	W	L	L	D	D	L	L	D	L	D	D	W	L	W	W	W
JS Kairouan	W	L	L	D	W	W	L	L	L	L	L	L	W	L	L	D	L	L	W	W	L	D	L	L	W	L	L	W	W	D
JS El Omrane	W	L	W	L	D	L	D	W	L	W	D	D	L	L	L	L	W	L	W	W	L	W	W	D	L	L	W	L	L	D
Olympique Béja	L	D	L	D	L	L	L	W	L	W	L	L	L	W	L	D	L	W	L	W	W	L	D	L	W	L	W	L	W	D
Stade Tunisien	D	W	D	W	W	W	W	D	W	W	D	D	D	L	W	D	W	W	D	L	L	W	D	D	D	L	L	L	D	W
US Ben Guerdane	W	L	D	D	L	L	D	L	D	D	D	W	W	W	L	D	W	D	D	L	L	L	L	D	W	W	W	L	D	L
US Monastir	D	D	W	D	D	W	W	D	W	L	D	D	D	W	W	D	W	L	W	L	W	D	L	D	D	L	W	L	L	W

Source: Tunisian Football Federation
W = Win; D = Draw; L = Lose

=== Positions by round ===
Team ╲ Round	1	2	3	4	5	6	7	8	9	10	11	12	13	14	15	16	17	18	19	20	21	22	23	24	25	26	27	28	29	30
AS Gabès	11	11	8	9	13	14	14	15	15	16	16	15	15	16	16	16	15	16	16	15	15	15	15	15	16	16	16	16	16	16
AS Marsa	13	5	10	12	14	10	12	12	11	11	12	11	9	10	9	9	10	10	10	12	9	10	11	10	11	12	12	11	11	11
AS Soliman	14	15	14	16	15	15	15	13	13	14	14	14	14	14	14	14	14	15	15	16	16	16	16	16	15	15	15	15	15	15
Club Africain	4	2	4	2	3	3	4	4	3	2	1	2	2	2	2	2	2	2	2	2	2	2	2	2	2	1	1	1	1	1
CA Bizertin	8	12	12	14	10	8	11	8	7	9	10	10	11	12	12	11	12	11	12	11	11	11	8	8	8	7	10	12	12	12
CS Sfaxien	12	13	13	10	11	9	8	9	6	6	7	7	6	4	4	4	4	4	4	4	3	3	3	3	3	3	3	3	3	3
ES Métlaoui	9	4	2	5	5	7	6	7	8	7	6	6	7	7	7	7	6	7	7	8	7	9	9	9	9	8	7	6	7	8
Étoile du Sahel	15	16	15	11	9	12	10	11	12	12	9	9	8	8	8	8	8	8	8	6	6	6	6	6	6	6	6	7	6	7
Espérance de Tunis	10	9	5	3	4	4	3	2	2	3	3	1	1	1	1	1	1	1	1	1	1	1	1	1	1	2	2	2	2	2
ES Zarzis	3	1	1	1	1	2	2	3	5	5	4	4	5	6	6	6	7	6	6	7	8	8	10	11	10	9	11	8	8	6
JS Kairouan	5	7	11	13	8	6	7	10	10	10	11	13	13	13	13	13	13	14	13	13	14	13	14	14	14	14	14	14	14	14
JS El Omrane	1	6	3	7	7	11	9	6	9	8	8	8	10	11	11	12	11	12	11	9	10	7	7	7	7	10	8	9	9	9
Olympique Béja	16	14	16	15	16	16	16	16	16	15	15	16	16	15	15	15	16	13	14	14	13	14	13	13	13	13	13	13	13	14
Stade Tunisien	7	3	7	4	2	1	1	1	1	1	2	3	3	3	3	3	3	3	3	3	4	4	4	4	4	4	4	4	4	4
US Ben Guerdane	2	8	9	8	12	13	13	14	14	13	13	12	12	9	10	10	9	9	9	10	12	12	12	12	12	11	11	10	10	10
US Monastir	6	10	6	6	6	5	5	5	4	4	5	5	4	5	5	5	5	5	5	5	5	5	5	5	5	5	5	5	5	5

Leader
2026–27 CAF Champions League
2026–27 CAF Confederation Cup
Relegation to Ligue 2

Source: Tunisian Football Federation

== Season statistics ==
=== Goalscorers ===
Rank	Goalscorer	Club	Goals
1	(Tunisia) Firas Chaouat	CA	15
2	(Tunisia) Omar Ben Ali	CSS	11
3	(Algeria) Kouceila Boualia	EST	8

7 goals (5 players)
- (Tunisia) Ahmed Hadhri – ASM
- (Tunisia) Hichem Baccar – CSS
- (Tunisia) Moemen Rahmani – ESZ
- (Tunisia) Islem Chelghoumi – OB
- (Senegal) Amadou Dia N'Diaye – ST
6 goals (6 players)
- (Nigeria) Emmanuel Ogbole – CSS
- (Tunisia) Iyed Belwafi – CSS
- (Tunisia) Ahmed Ouled Behi – ESM
- (Tunisia) Achref Jabri – EST
- (Rwanda) Innocent Nshuti – ESZ
- (Tunisia) Fakhreddine Ben Youssef – USM
5 goals (3 players)
- (Brazil) Yan Sasse – EST
- (Nigeria) Stanley Ogoh – ESZ
- (Mali) Abdoulaye Kanou – JSK
4 goals (9 players)
- (Democratic Republic of the Congo) Phillippe Kinzumbi – CA
- (Tunisia) Ghaith Zaalouni – CA
- (Tunisia) Rayane Anane – ESS
- (Tunisia) Raki Aouani – ESS
- (Burkina Faso) Jack Diarra – ASS & EST
- (France) Florian Danho – EST
- (Tunisia) Hamza Jelassi – EST
- (Tunisia) Amine Haboubi – ST
- (Tunisia) Moez Hadj Ali – USM
3 goals (19 players)
- (Tunisia) Hosni Guezmir – ST & ASG
- (Ivory Coast) Youssouf Dao – ASM
- (Tunisia) Yosri Arfaoui – ASM
- (France) Manoubi Haddad – ASS
- (Tunisia) Bilel Aït Malek – CA
- (Tunisia) Aymen Harzi – USM & CA
- (Tunisia) Sadok Mahmoud – CA
- (Tunisia) Mohamed Yassine Chaabani – ESS
- (Algeria) Youcef Belaïli – EST
- (Tunisia) Achraf Ben Dhiaf – ESZ
- (Tunisia) Mohamed Amine Zairi – JSK
- (Tunisia) Haroune Kouki – JSO
- (Tunisia) Mustapha Souissi – JSO
- (Tunisia) Chiheb Zoghlami – JSO
- (Tunisia) Youssef Saafi – ST
- (Algeria) Abdelouahab Bakhouche – USBG
- (Tunisia) Adem Taous – USBG
- (Tunisia) Youssef Abdelli – USM
- (Tunisia) Raed Chikhaoui – USM
2 goals (53 players)
- (Benin) Gislain Ahoudo – ASG
- (Tunisia) Amanallah Ben Hamida – ASM
- (Tunisia) Ahmed Bouassida – ASS
- (Tunisia) Helmi Jouidi – ASS
- (Tunisia) Amenallah Majhed – ASS
- (Libya) Ali Youssef – CA
- (Tunisia) Hamza Khadhraoui – CA
- (Tunisia) Oussama Shili – CA
- (Nigeria) Olamilekan Ayinde – CAB
- (Senegal) Ibrahima Cissoko – CAB
- (Senegal) Momar Diop – CAB
- (Senegal) Mandione Mbaye – CAB
- (Tunisia) Mohamed Amine Allela – CAB
- (Tunisia) Ahmed Amri – CAB
- (Tunisia) Rayane Rehimi – CAB
- (Rwanda) Willy Onana – CSS
- (Tunisia) Ali Maâloul – CSS
- (Tunisia) Hamza Mathlouthi – CSS
- (Uganda) Travis Mutyaba – CSS
- (Guinea) Naby Sylla – ESM
- (Senegal) Cherif Bodian – ESM
- (Tunisia) Oussama Bahri – ESM
- (Tunisia) Hamza Mansri – ESM
- (Tunisia) Yassine Soltani – ESM
- (Senegal) Moussa Senghor – ESS
- (Tunisia) Oussama Abid – ESS
- (Tunisia) Maher Ben Sghaier – ESS
- (Tunisia) Mohamed Bouslama – ESS
- (Algeria) Mohamed Amine Tougai – EST
- (Tunisia) Chiheb Jebali – EST
- (Tunisia) Houssem Tka – EST
- (Tunisia) Khalil Kassab – ESZ
- (Central African Republic) Ghislain Mounguide – JSK
- (Tunisia) Youssef Azib – JSK
- (Tunisia) Rayen Hamrouni – JSK
- (Tunisia) Mohamed Askri – JSO
- (Tunisia) Ouday Belhaj – JSO
- (Tunisia) Iheb Ben Rejeb – JSO
- (Tunisia) Bilel Mgannem – JSO
- (Tunisia) Bilel Touati – JSO
- (Guinea) Cherif Camara – OB
- (Tunisia) Bahaa Cherni – OB
- (Tunisia) Mohamed Hedi Hadouchi – OB
- (Tunisia) Youssef Dhaflaoui – ST
- (Tunisia) Mohamed Amine Khemissi – ST
- (Tunisia) Wael Ouerghemmi – ST
- (Tunisia) Iyed Hadj Khalifa – USBG
- (Tunisia) Borhane Hakimi – USBG
- (Tunisia) Wael Salhi – USBG
- (Mali) Ibrahim Gadiaga – USM
- (Tunisia) Mehdi Ganouni – USM
- (Tunisia) Malek Miladi – USM
- (Tunisia) Ibrahim Souissi – USM
1 goal (84 players)
- (Tunisia) Hsan Jmal – ASG
- (Tunisia) Mohamed Khadhraoui – ASG
- (Tunisia) Nassim Khedher – ASG
- (Tunisia) Oussama Naffati – ASG
- (Tunisia) Mohamed Amine Naoui – ASG
- (Tunisia) Aziz Sekrafi – ASG
- (Tunisia) Hakim Tka – ASG
- (Angola) Victorino Polaco – ASM
- (Ivory Coast) Ricky Gneba – ASM
- (Nigeria) Ojonugwa Adejoh – ASM
- (Nigeria) Godwin Kalu – ASM
- (Tunisia) Mohamed Chaouch – ASM
- (Tunisia) Othman Karoui – ASM
- (Tunisia) Mohamed Amine Khaloui – ASM
- (Tunisia) Omar Traidi – ASM
- (The Gambia) Kebba Sowe – ASS
- (Senegal) Babacar Diarra – ASS
- (Tunisia) Dhiaeddine Jebli – ASS
- (Tunisia) Jasser Khmiri – ASS
- (The Gambia) Saidou Khan – CA
- (Libya) Osama Elsharimi – CA
- (Tunisia) Oussama Bouguerra – CA
- (Tunisia) Sadok Kadida – CA
- (Tunisia) Houssem Hassen Romdhane – CA
- (Algeria) Youcef Fellahi – CAB
- (Tunisia) Farouk Bougatfa – CAB
- (Tunisia) Wassim Chihi – CAB
- (Burkina Faso) Hasamadou Ouedraogo – CSS
- (Tunisia) Mohamed Amine Ben Ali – CSS
- (Tunisia) Rayen Derbali – CSS
- (Tunisia) Nour Karoui – CSS
- (Tunisia) Mohamed Salah Mhadhebi – CSS
- (Cameroon) Brandon Nana – ESM
- (Tunisia) Mohamed Hassine – ESM
- (Tunisia) Fares Meskini – ESM
- (Algeria) Mohamed Ben Mazouz – ESS
- (Algeria) Zineddine Boutmène – ESS
- (Tunisia) Mohamed Amine Ben Amor – ESS
- (Tunisia) Mokhles Chouchane – ESS
- (Tunisia) Houssem Dagdoug – ESS
- (Tunisia) Mohamed Dhaoui – ESS
- (Tunisia) Ghofrane Naouali – ESS
- (Tunisia) Nizar Smichi – ESS
- (Ivory Coast) Abdramane Konaté – EST
- (Nigeria) Onuche Ogbelu – EST
- (Tunisia) Mohamed Amine Ben Hamida – EST
- (Tunisia) Koussay Maacha – EST
- (Tunisia) Yassine Meriah – EST
- (Tunisia) Hamza Rafia – EST
- (Tunisia) Arkem Taboubi – EST
- (Cameroon) David Nyengue – ESZ
- (Nigeria) Adepoju Oluwaseun – ESZ
- (Tunisia) Jassem Belkilani – ESZ
- (Tunisia) Firas Ghouma – ESZ
- (Tunisia) Mohamed Hedi Jertila – ESZ
- (Gabon) Christ Bekale – JSK
- (Guinea) Bangaly Cissé – JSK
- (Nigeria) Ifeanyi Ogba – JSK
- (Tunisia) Zinedine Kada – JSK
- (Tunisia) Idriss Liouan – JSK
- (Tunisia) Mohamed Ben Amor – JSO
- (Tunisia) Sami Hammami – JSO
- (Tunisia) Firas Mahdouani – JSO
- (Tunisia) Anouar Jouini – JSO
- (Tunisia) Omar Zouaghi – JSO
- (Algeria) Houcine Gafsi – OB
- (Tunisia) Bechir Hasni – OB
- (Tunisia) Haythem Mbarek – OB
- (Tunisia) Mohamed Ali Ragoubi – OB
- (Nigeria) Yakubu Abubakar – ST
- (Senegal) Boubacar Camara – ST
- (Tunisia) Adem Arous – ST
- (Tunisia) Amir Jaouadi – ST
- (Tunisia) Mohamed Riahi – ST
- (Tunisia) Rafaeddine Riahi – ST
- (Tunisia) Aziz Saihi – ST
- (Tunisia) Mohamed Rayan Smaali – ST
- (Nigeria) Daniel Oboh – USBG
- (Senegal) Mustapha Samb – USBG
- (Tunisia) Abdallah Amri – USBG
- (Tunisia) Ayoub Ben Mcharek – USBG
- (Tunisia) Idriss Mhirsi – USBG
- (Tunisia) Yassine Amri – USM
- (Tunisia) Adnene Yaakoubi – USM
Own goals (8 goals)
- (Ivory Coast) Naude Zeguei – USM (for CA) – 21 October 2025
- (Tunisia) Iheb Ben Amor – ASG (for ASM) – 28 January 2026
- (Tunisia) Mohamed Yassine Arayedh – ESZ (for JSK) – 27 February 2026
- (Senegal) Babacar Diarra – ASS (for ESS) – 28 February 2026
- (Tunisia) Jasser Khmiri – ASS (for CAB) – 4 April 2026
- (Tunisia) Wajdi Kechrida – ESS (for OB) – 11 April 2026
- (Tunisia) Raed Chikhaoui – USM (for USBG) – 25 April 2026
- (Tunisia) Firas Fadhli – OB (for ESZ) – 26 April 2026
Awarded goals (4 goals)
- 1 goal for CA against CAB – 27 August 2025
- 2 goals for ASM against ESZ – 2 November 2025
- 1 goal for CSS against USM – 7 March 2026

=== Hat-tricks ===
Player	For	Against	Result	Date
(Tunisia) Firas Chaouat	Club Africain	Étoile du Sahel	3–0 (H)	22 January 2026
(Nigeria) Emmanuel Ogbole	CS Sfaxien	JS Kairouan	3–0 (H)	5 April 2026

=== Scoring ===
- First goal of the season:
  (Tunisia) Sadok Mahmoud for Club Africain against AS Marsa (9 August 2025)
- Last goal of the season:
  (Tunisia) Oussama Abid for Étoile du Sahel against CS Sfaxien (14 May 2026)

== Number of teams by Governorate ==
Position	Governorate	Number	Teams
1	Tunis	5	AS Marsa, Club Africain, Espérance de Tunis, JS El Omrane, Stade Tunisien
2	Medenine	2	ES Zarzis, US Ben Guerdane
3	Béja	1	Olympique Béja
3	Bizerte	1	CA Bizertin
3	Gabès	1	AS Gabès
3	Gafsa	1	ES Métlaoui
3	Kairouan	1	JS Kairouan
3	Monastir	1	US Monastir
3	Nabeul	1	AS Soliman
3	Sfax	1	CS Sfaxien
3	Sousse	1	Étoile du Sahel

== See also ==
- 2025–26 Tunisian Cup
