= Hazem Mastouri =

Tunisian footballer (born 1997)

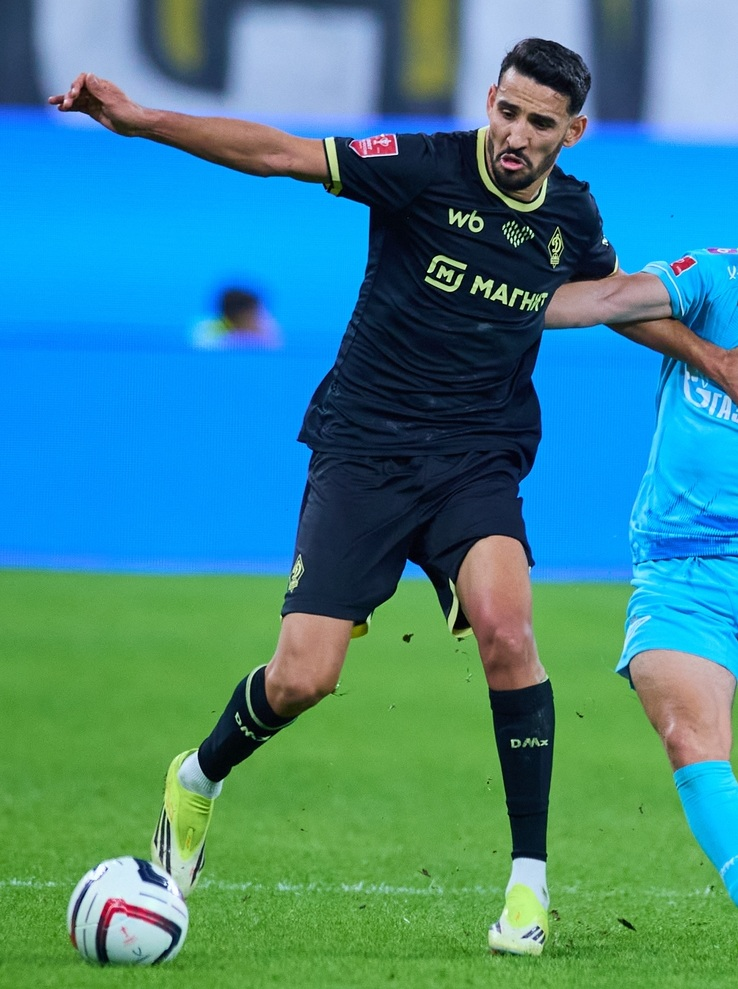
- Mastouri with Dynamo Makhachkala in 2026

Personal information
- Date of birth: 18 June 1997 (age 29)
- Place of birth: Tunis, Tunisia
- Height: 1.91 m (6 ft 3 in)
- Position: Striker

Team information
- Current team: Espérance de Tunis
- Number: 27

Youth career
- AS Degache

Senior career*
Years	Team	Apps	(Gls)
2016–2020	AS Degache		
2020–2021	LPS Tozeur		
2021–2023	ES Métlaoui	32	(10)
2023–2024	Al Najaf	4	(3)
2024–2025	US Monastir	28	(16)
2025–2026	Dynamo Makhachkala	21	(2)
2026–	Espérance de Tunis	6	(4)

International career^{‡}
2024–	Tunisia	21	(7)
- * Club domestic league appearances and goals as of 7 November 2026 ‡ National team caps and goals as of 28 September 2026

Hazem Mastouri (Arabic: حازم المستوري; born 18 June 1997) is a Tunisian professional footballer who plays as a striker for Tunisian Ligue Professionnelle 1 club Espérance de Tunis and the Tunisia national team.

== Club career ==
Mastouri began playing football in the amateur Tunisian Ligue 3 with AS Degache in 2016. In 2020, he had a short stint with LPS Tozeur. This led to a move to the Tunisian Ligue Professionnelle 1 side ES Métlaoui in 2021 where he stayed 2 and a half season. On 26 September 2023, he moved to the Iraq Stars League team Al Najaf where he scored 10 goals. On 15 August 2024, he transferred to US Monastir on a 2-year contract.

On 17 August 2025, Mastouri signed with Russian Premier League club Dynamo Makhachkala.

== International career ==
He debuted with the Tunisia national team in a 3–2 2025 Africa Cup of Nations qualification win over Madagascar on 14 November 2024, helping his team qualify for the final competition with the win.

Selected for the 2026 World Cup, he scored Tunisia's only goal of the match in a 1–3 loss in the 54th minute of the final group stage game against the Netherlands.

== Career statistics ==
=== Club ===
As of 7 November 2026

Club	Season	League			Cup		Continental		Other		Total	
Club	Season	Division	Apps	Goals	Apps	Goals	Apps	Goals	Apps	Goals	Apps	Goals
ES Métlaoui	2021–22	Tunisian Ligue Professionnelle 1	15	6	—		—		—		15	6
ES Métlaoui	2022–23	Tunisian Ligue Professionnelle 1	13	2	3	2	—		—		16	4
ES Métlaoui	2023–24	Tunisian Ligue Professionnelle 1	4	2	0	0	—		—		4	2
ES Métlaoui	Total		32	10	3	2	0	0	0	0	35	12
US Monastir	2024–25	Tunisian Ligue Professionnelle 1	27	16	3	2	2 (Note: Appearances in CAF Champions League)	0	—		32	18
US Monastir	2025–26	Tunisian Ligue Professionnelle 1	1	0	—		—		—		1	0
US Monastir	Total		28	16	3	2	2	0	0	0	33	18
Dynamo Makhachkala	2025–26	Russian Premier League	21	2	7	2	—		1 (Note: Appearances in relegation play-offs)	0	29	4
Dynamo Makhachkala	2026–27	Russian Premier League	0	0	2	0	—		—		2	0
Dynamo Makhachkala	Total		21	2	9	2	0	0	1	0	31	4
Espérance de Tunis	2026–27	Tunisian Ligue Professionnelle 1	6	4	0	0	2	0	0	0	8	4
Career total			87	32	15	6	4	0	1	0	107	38

=== International ===
As of match played 28 September 2026

Appearances and goals by national team and year
National team	Year	Apps	Goals
Tunisia	2024	2	0
Tunisia	2025	14	4
Tunisia	2026	5	3
Total		21	7

As of match played 28 September 2026. Tunisia's score listed first, score column indicates score after each Mastouri goal.

List of international goals scored by Hazem Mastouri
No.	Date	Venue	Cap	Opponent	Score	Result	Competition	Ref.
1	19 March 2025	Antoinette Tubman Stadium, Monrovia, Liberia	3	Liberia	1–0	1–0	2026 FIFA World Cup qualification	
2	2 June 2025	Hammadi Agrebi Stadium, Tunis, Tunisia	5	Burkina Faso	2–0	2–0	Friendly	
3	4 September 2025	Hammadi Agrebi Stadium, Tunis, Tunisia	7	Liberia	1–0	3–0	2026 FIFA World Cup qualification	
4	18 November 2025	Stade Pierre-Mauroy, Lille, France	8	Brazil	1–0	1–1	Friendly	
5	25 June 2026	Arrowhead Stadium, Kansas City, United States	20	Netherlands	1–2	1–3	2026 FIFA World Cup	
6	28 September 2026	Hammadi Agrebi Stadium, Tunis, Tunisia	21	Botswana	1–1	2–2	2027 Africa Cup of Nations qualification	
7	28 September 2026	Hammadi Agrebi Stadium, Tunis, Tunisia	21	Botswana	2–1	2–2	2027 Africa Cup of Nations qualification	
