= Adel Bettaieb =

Tunisian association football player (born 1997)

Personal information
- Date of birth: 28 January 1997 (age 29)
- Place of birth: Villiers-le-Bel, France
- Height: 1.84 m (6 ft 0 in)
- Position: Forward

Team information
- Current team: Raja CA

Youth career
- 2006–2010: Villiers-le-Bel
- 2010–2011: INF Clairefontaine
- 2011–2012: Red Star
- 2012–2014: Angers

Senior career*
Years	Team	Apps	(Gls)
2014–2018	Angers B	52	(6)
2018–2019	La Louviere Centre	28	(18)
2019–2022	Dudelange	60	(33)
2022–2023	Ümraniyespor	21	(0)
2023–2024	Boluspor	19	(2)
2024	Politehnica Iași	17	(4)
2024–2025	Universitatea Cluj	15	(0)
2025–2026	Argeș Pitești	38	(12)
2026	Espérance de Tunis	0	(0)
2026–	Raja CA	0	(0)
- * Club domestic league appearances and goals as of 7 September 2026

Adel Bettaieb (Arabic: عادل بالطيب; born 28 January 1997) is a professional footballer who plays as a forward for Botola Pro club Raja CA. Born in France, he has been called up to the Tunisia national team.

== Professional career ==
A youth product of a local club in Villiers-le-Bel for 4 years, Bettaieb moved to the famed French academy INF Clairefontaine at the age of 13, and followed that up with stints at the youth sides of Red Star and Angers. He began his senior career with their reserves in 2014. He transferred to the Belgian National Division 1 club La Louviere on 2 July 2018. He moved to the Luxembourgish club Dudelange in the summer of 2019. He helped Dudelange win the 2021–22 Luxembourg National Division. On 30 June 2022, he signed a professional 1+1 year contract with the newly promoted side Ümraniyespor in the Turkish Süper Lig. He made his professional debut with Ümraniyespor in a 3–3 Süper Lig tie with Fenerbahçe on 8 August 2022.

== International career ==
Born in France, Bettaieb is of Tunisian descent through his father. He was called up to the senior Tunisia national teams in September 2019 without featuring.

== Career statistics ==
=== Club ===
As of match played 15 May 2026

Club	Season	League			National cup (Note: Includes Luxembourg Cup, Turkish Cup, Cupa României and Tunisian Cup)		Europe		Other		Total	
Club	Season	Division	Apps	Goals	Apps	Goals	Apps	Goals	Apps	Goals	Apps	Goals
Angers B	2014–15	CFA 2	11	1	—		—		—		11	1
Angers B	2015–16	CFA 2	5	1	—		—		—		5	1
Angers B	2016–17	CFA 2	22	2	—		—		—		22	2
Angers B	2017–18	Championnat National 3	14	2	—		—		—		14	2
Angers B	Total		52	6	—		—		—		52	6
La Louviere Centre	2018–19	Belgian Second Amateur Division	28	18	0	0	—		—		28	18
Dudelange	2019–20	Luxembourg National Division	9	1	2	1	6 (Note: One appearance and one goal in UEFA Champions League, five appearances and one goal in UEFA Europa League)	2	0	0	17	2
Dudelange	2020–21	Luxembourg National Division	23	17	0	0	—		—		23	17
Dudelange	2021–22	Luxembourg National Division	28	15	4	4	2 (Note: Appearances in UEFA Conference League)	0	—		34	19
Dudelange	Total		60	33	6	5	8	2	0	0	74	40
Ümraniyespor	2022–23	Süper Lig	21	0	3	1	—		—		24	1
Boluspor	2023–24	TFF 1. Lig	19	2	1	0	—		—		20	2
Politehnica Iași	2023–24	Liga I	17	4	—		—		—		17	4
Universitatea Cluj	2024–25	Liga I	15	0	—		—		—		15	0
Argeș Pitești	2025–26	Liga I	38	12	5	0	—		—		43	12
Espérance de Tunis	2026–27	Tunisian Ligue Professionnelle 1	—		—		—		—		0	0
Raja CA	2026–27	Botola Pro	0	0	0	0	0	0	—		0	0
Career total			250	75	15	6	8	2	0	0	273	83

== Honours ==
La Louviere Centre

- Belgian Second Amateur Division: 2018–19 (Division C)

Dudelange

- Luxembourg National Division: 2021–22
- Luxembourg Cup runner-up: 2021–22
