= Tozeur Stadium =

Multi-purpose stadium in Tozeur, Tunisia

- ملعب توزر (Arabic)
- Interactive map of Tozeur Stadium
- Location: Tozeur, Tunisia
- Coordinates: 33°55′28″N 8°06′43″E
- Owner: Government of Tunisia
- Capacity: 4,000
- Surface: Grass

Tenant
- LPS Tozeur

Tozeur Stadium (Arabic: ملعب توزر), also known as Mohamed Tombari Stadium (Arabic: ملعب محمد الطمباري), a name honoring Mohamed Tombari, a former football player and coach from Tozeur, is a multi-purpose stadium in Tozeur, Tunisia, located in the southwest of the country. it is home of the football team LPS Tozeur. It hosted matches during LPS Tozeur's time in the Tunisian Ligue Professionnelle 1, including the club's 2013–14 top-flight season before their relegation.

== Description ==
=== Mohamed Tombari Complex ===
The stadium forms part of the Mohamed Tombari Sports Complex. The complex hosts a number of sports facilities, including a full-size football pitch, an athletics track, and the home ground of table tennis club Club de Tennis de Table de Tozeur (C.T.T. Tozeur), founded in 1981.

== See also ==
- List of football stadiums in Tunisia
- Lists of stadiums
