= Jesús Castillo (Peruvian footballer) =

Peruvian footballer (born 2001)

Personal information
- Full name: Jesús Abdallah Castillo Molina
- Date of birth: 11 June 2001 (age 25)
- Place of birth: Callao, Peru
- Height: 1.85 m (6 ft 1 in)
- Position: Defensive midfielder

Team information
- Current team: Espérance de Tunis
- Number: 16

Senior career*
Years	Team	Apps	(Gls)
2020–2023	Sporting Cristal	90	(3)
2023–2025	Gil Vicente	26	(0)
2025–2026	Universitario de Deportes	35	(0)
2026–	Espérance de Tunis	7	(0)

International career^{‡}
2022–	Peru	16	(1)
- * Club domestic league appearances and goals as of 22 November 2026 ‡ National team caps and goals as of 31 March 2026

Jesús Abdallah Castillo Molina (born 11 June 2001) is a Peruvian professional footballer who plays as a defensive midfielder for Tunisian Ligue Professionnelle 1 club Espérance de Tunis and the Peru national team.

== Club career ==
In July 2023, Castillo left Sporting Cristal in Peru to join Portuguese club Gil Vicente. In June 2025, he signed for Universitario de Deportes. In August 2026, he joined Tunisian Ligue Professionnelle 1 club Espérance de Tunis.

== International career ==
Castillo made his debut for the Peru national team in 2022. By 2024, during 2026 FIFA World Cup qualification, he had become a regular in the team's lineup.

== Career statistics ==
=== Club ===
As of match played 22 November 2026

Appearances and goals by club, season and competition
Club	Season	League			National cup		League cup		Continental		Other		Total	
Club	Season	Division	Apps	Goals	Apps	Goals	Apps	Goals	Apps	Goals	Apps	Goals	Apps	Goals
Sporting Cristal	2020	Peruvian Primera División	18	0	0	0	—		0	0	0	0	18	0
Sporting Cristal	2021	Peruvian Primera División	26	1	3	0	—		7 (Note: Three appearances in Copa Libertadores, four appearances in Copa Sudamericana)	0	0	0	36	0
Sporting Cristal	2022	Peruvian Primera División	32	2	0	0	—		6 (Note: Appearances in Copa Libertadores)	0	0	0	38	2
Sporting Cristal	2023	Peruvian Primera División	14	0	0	0	—		11 (Note: Ten appearances in Copa Libertadores, one appearance in Copa Sudamericana)	0	0	0	25	2
Sporting Cristal	Total		90	3	3	0	—		24	0	0	0	117	3
Gil Vicente	2023–24	Primeira Liga	11	0	1	0	1	0	—		—		13	0
Gil Vicente	2024–25	Primeira Liga	15	0	3	0	—		—		—		18	0
Gil Vicente	Total		24	0	4	0	1	0	—		—		29	0
Universitario de Deportes	2025	Liga 1	16	0	0	0	—		2	0	—		18	0
Universitario de Deportes	2026	Liga 1	8	0	0	0	—		—		—		8	0
Universitario de Deportes	Total		24	0	0	0	—		2	0	—		26	0
Espérance de Tunis	2026–27	Tunisian Ligue Professionnelle 1	7	0	0	0	—		2 (Note: Appearances in CAF Champions League)	0	0	0	9	0
Career total			145	3	7	0	2	0	28	0	0	0	181	3

=== International ===
As of match played 31 March 2026

Appearances and goals by national team and year
National team	Year	Apps	Goals
Peru	2022	3	0
Peru	2023	3	0
Peru	2024	7	1
Peru	2025	1	0
Peru	2026	2	0
Total		16	1

Scores and results list Peru's goal tally first, score column indicates score after each Castillo goal.

List of international goals scored by Jesús Castillo
No.	Date	Venue	Opponent	Score	Result	Competition
1	27 March 2024	Estadio Monumental "U", Lima, Peru	Dominican Republic	2–0	4–1	Friendly

== Honours ==
Universitario de Deportes

- Peruvian Primera División: 2025

Sporting Cristal

- Peruvian Primera División: 2020
- Copa Bicentenario: 2021
