= 2025–26 Tunisian Super Cup =

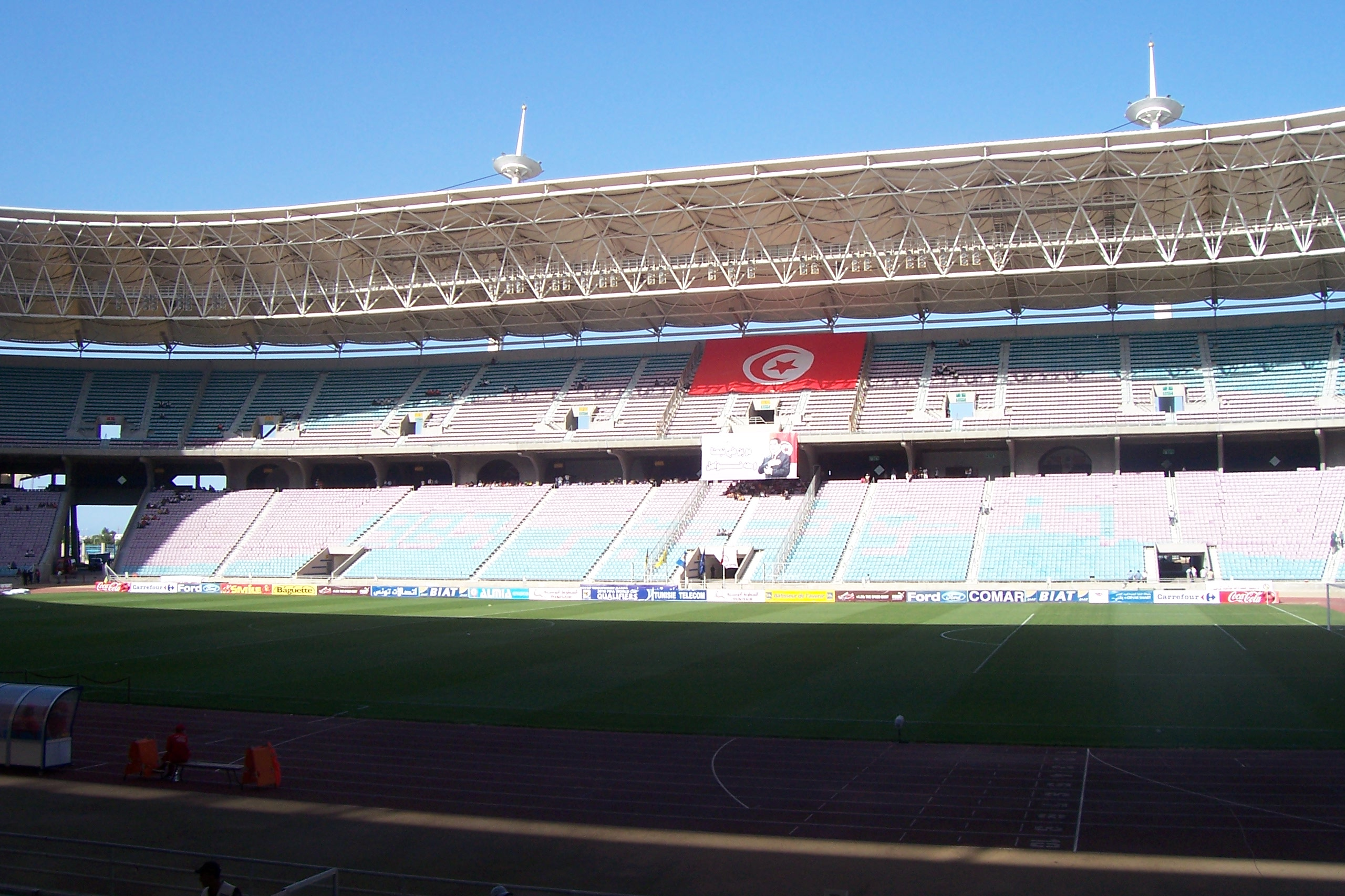
- Hammadi Agrebi Stadium will host the match
Club Africain	Espérance de Tunis
Ligue 1	Tunisian Cup
- Date: 31 January 2027
- Venue: Hammadi Agrebi Stadium, Tunis

The 2025–26 Tunisian Super Cup will be the 21st edition of the Tunisian Super Cup. The match was contested by the 2025–26 Tunisian Ligue Professionnelle 1 champions, Club Africain, and the 2025–26 Tunisian Cup winners, Espérance de Tunis. The match will be played on 31 January 2027 at the Hammadi Agrebi Stadium.

== Venue ==
Hammadi Agrebi Stadium, formerly known as 7 November Stadium is a multi-purpose stadium in Radès, Tunis, Tunisia about 10 kilometers south-east of the city center of Tunis, in the center of the Olympic City. It is currently used mostly for football matches and it also has facilities for athletics. The stadium holds 60,000 and was built in 2001 for the 2001 Mediterranean Games and is considered to be one of the best stadiums in Africa.

== See also ==
- 2025–26 Tunisian Ligue Professionnelle 1
- 2025–26 Tunisian Cup
