= Maël Fernandez =

Cameroonian professional footballer

Personal information
- Full name: Maël Fernandez Monyebe
- Date of birth: 5 January 2007 (age 19)
- Place of birth: Garoua, Cameroon
- Height: 1.78 m (5 ft 10 in)
- Positions: Right winger; attacking midfielder

Team information
- Current team: Espérance de Tunis
- Number: 29

Senior career*
Years	Team	Apps	(Gls)
2025–2026	Gazelle Garoua	0	(0)
2026–	Espérance de Tunis	4	(1)

International career^{‡}
2026–	Cameroon	2	(0)
- * Club domestic league appearances and goals as of 29 October 2026 ‡ National team caps and goals as of 27 March 2026

Maël Fernandez Monyebe (born 5 January 2007) is a Cameroonian professional footballer who plays as a right winger or attacking midfielder for Tunisian Ligue Professionnelle 1 club Espérance de Tunis and the Cameroon national team.

== Early life ==
Maël Fernandez Monyebe was born on 5 January 2007, in Garoua, in the North Region of Cameroon. He was trained at the local club Gazelle FA de Garoua, where he started with the youth teams and very quickly reached the first team.

== Club career ==
Fernandez made his professional debut with Gazelle FA de Garoua in the Elite One during the 2024–25 season.

His performances attracted the attention of several clubs, and on 14 July 2026, Espérance Sportive de Tunis. He wore the number 29 jersey.

He made his debut for the Tunisian club on 23 August 2026, coming on as a substitute in the 71st minute against Étoile du Sahel. In his second match for Espérance de Tunis, against AS Marsa, he scored his first goal.

== International career ==
In March 2026, Fernandez was called up for the first time to the Cameroon national team by coach David Pagou. He made his debut on 28 March 2026 against Australia, playing 89 minutes in a 1–0 defeat, then earned a second cap on 31 March 2026 against China in a 2–0 victory.

== Career statistics ==
=== International ===
As of match played 31 March 2026

Appearances and goals by national team and year
National team	Year	Apps	Goals
Cameroon	2026	2	0
Total		2	0
