= Marouane Sahraoui =

Tunisian footballer (born 1996)

Personal information
- Date of birth: 9 January 1996 (age 30)
- Place of birth: Marseille, France
- Height: 1.86 m (6 ft 1 in)
- Position: Defender

Team information
- Current team: Espérance de Tunis
- Number: 4

Youth career
- 2013–2014: Espérance de Tunis

Senior career*
Years	Team	Apps	(Gls)
2014–2015	Espérance de Tunis	0	(0)
2015–2016	Metz B	0	(0)
2015–2016	→ RFC Seraing (loan)	17	(0)
2016–2020	Vitória Guimarães B	8	(0)
2020–2022	Ismaily SC	31	(0)
2021–2022	Future FC	13	(0)
2022–2023	ENPPI	3	(0)
2022–2023	Ceramica Cleopatra	4	(0)
2023–2026	Stade Tunisien	60	(2)
2026–	Espérance de Tunis	3	(1)

International career
2013	Tunisia U17	6	(0)
2014	Tunisia U20	2	(0)
- * Club domestic league appearances and goals as of 13 September 2026

Marouane Sahraoui (Arabic: مروان الصحراوي; born 9 January 1996) is a professional footballer who plays as a defender for Tunisian Ligue Professionnelle 1 club Espérance de Tunis. Born in France, he is a youth international for Tunisia.

== Club career ==
Sahraoui made his professional debut in the Belgian First Division B for RFC Seraing on 26 September 2015 in a game against Dessel.

== International career ==
Sahraoui represented Tunisia at the 2013 FIFA U-17 World Cup. He was called up to the main Tunisia national team on one occasion in 2016, but is yet to make his on-field debut.
