= Hadj Mahmoud =

Tunisian footballer

Mohamed Belhadj Mahmoud
Personal information
- Full name: Mohamed Belhadj Mahmoud
- Date of birth: 24 April 2000 (age 26)
- Place of birth: Sousse, Tunisia
- Height: 1.79 m (5 ft 10 in)
- Position: Defensive midfielder

Team information
- Current team: Espérance de Tunis
- Number: 20

Youth career
- 2008–2021: Étoile du Sahel

Senior career*
Years	Team	Apps	(Gls)
2019–2021	Étoile du Sahel	35	(18)
2021–2026	Lugano	113	(14)
2026–	Espérance de Tunis	7	(1)

International career^{‡}
2025–	Tunisia	11	(0)
- * Club domestic league appearances and goals as of 7 November 2026 ‡ National team caps and goals as of 25 June 2026

Mohamed Belhadj Mahmoud (Arabic: مُحَمَّد بَلْحَاجّ مَحْمُود; born 24 April 2000) is a Tunisian professional footballer who plays as a defensive midfielder for Tunisian Ligue Professionnelle 1 club Espérance de Tunis and the Tunisia national team.

== Career ==
Belhadj Mahmoud joined the youth academy of Étoile du Sahel at the age of 7. He made his professional debut with the clb in a 0–0 Tunisian Ligue Professionnelle 1 tie with Métlaoui on 8 May 2019. On 27 August 2021, he transferred to the Swiss club FC Lugano signing a four-year contract.

== Honours ==
Lugano

- Swiss Cup: 2021–22
