= Raed Chikhaoui =

Tunisian footballer (born 2001)

Personal information
- Date of birth: 9 June 2004 (age 22)
- Place of birth: Sakiet Ezzit, Tunisia
- Height: 1.91 m (6 ft 3 in)
- Position: Center-back

Team information
- Current team: Espérance de Tunis
- Number: 25

Youth career
- ES Hammam Sousse

Senior career*
Years	Team	Apps	(Gls)
2022–2024	ES Hammam Sousse	9	(0)
2024–2026	US Monastir	44	(4)
2026–	Espérance de Tunis	8	(0)
- * Club domestic league appearances and goals as of 22 November 2026

Raed Chikhaoui (Arabic: رائد الشيخاوي; born 9 June 2004) is a Tunisian professional footballer who plays as a center-back for Tunisian Ligue Professionnelle 1 club Espérance de Tunis.

== Club career ==
Chikhaoui began his career with ES Hammam Sousse in the Tunisian Ligue 1. In February 2024, he signed for US Monastir.

== International career ==
In March 2026, Chikhaoui received his first call-up to the Tunisia national team. Two months later, he was named in the team's final squad for the 2026 FIFA World Cup.

== Playing style ==
Chikhaoui was given the nickname "The Watchtower" due to his height and his versatility, being able to play in the defense, the midfield and the attack.
