= Abdelaziz Chtioui Stadium =

Sports venue in Tunis, Tunisia

- ملعب عبد العزيز الشتيوي
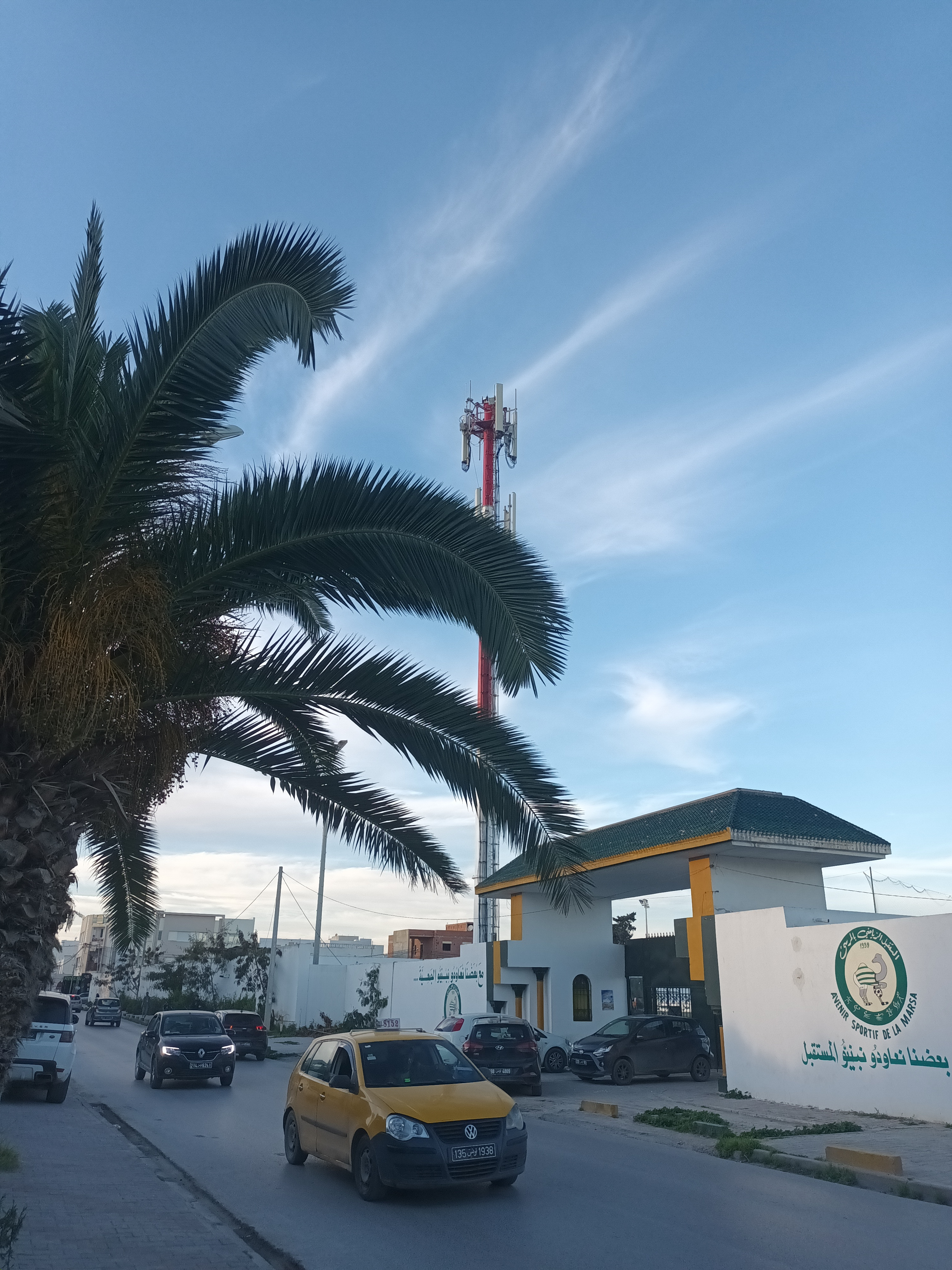
- Entrance to the stadium
- Interactive map of Abdelaziz Chtioui Stadium
- Full name: Abdelaziz Chtioui Stadium
- Address: Place Hédi-Khayachi, La Marsa, Tunisia
- Location: La Marsa, Tunisia
- Coordinates: 36°52′30″N 10°19′12″E
- Capacity: 6,500
- Surface: Grass

Tenant
- AS Marsa

Abdelaziz Chtioui Stadium (Arabic: ملعب عبدالعزيز شتوي) is a multi-purpose stadium in La Marsa, a northern suburb of Tunis, Tunisia. It is the home ground of football club AS Marsa and has a capacity of 6,500 spectators.
