= JS El Omrane =

Tunisian football club

- Full name: Jeunesse Sportive d'EL Omrane
- Short name: JSO
- Founded: 1943
- Ground: Chedly Zouiten Stadium
- Capacity: 18,000
- Chairman: Tarek Hamza
- Coach: Amine Beji
- League: Tunisian Ligue Professionnelle 1
- 2025–26: Ligue 1, 9th of 16
Home colours	Away colours

Jeunesse sportive d'El Omrane (Arabic: الشبيبة الرياضية بالعمران) known as JS El Omrane or simply JSO for short, is a Tunisian football club based in the quarter of El Omrane in Tunis. The club was founded in 1943 and its colours are blue and yellow. Their home stadium, Chedly Zouiten Stadium, has a capacity of 18,000 spectators. The club is currently playing in the Tunisian Ligue Professionnelle 1.

At the 2023–24 season, the team played in the Tunisian Ligue Professionnelle 2 in group A. they topped the group and reached the Tunisian Ligue Professionnelle 1 for the first time. On 28 June 2024, they played the Ligue Professionnelle 2 final against Espérance de Zarzis and won 2–1 to win the title.

== Current squad ==
As of 27 September 2026

Note: Flags indicate national team as defined under FIFA eligibility rules; some limited exceptions apply. Players may hold more than one non-FIFA nationality.

No.	Pos.	Nation	Player
1	GK	TUN	Wassim Karoui
4	DF	TUN	Kabil Othmani
5	DF	TUN	Samer Marouani
6	MF	NGR	Aly Casmir Chinonso
7	FW	TUN	Souhaieb Abdelli
8	MF	TUN	Anouar Jouini
9	FW	TUN	Bilel Touati
10	MF	TUN	Ghaith Ben Hamida
11	FW	TUN	Ouday Belhaj
12	DF	TUN	Moustapha Souissi
13	GK	TUN	Seif Nahdi
14	MF	TUN	Firas Mahdhaoui
15	DF	TUN	Aziz Gharbi
17	FW	TUN	Chiheb Zoughlami

No.	Pos.	Nation	Player
18	DF	NGR	Chigozie Eruchukwu
19	MF	TUN	Mohamed Amine Ben Amor
20	DF	TUN	Sami Hammami
21	FW	CIV	Lionel Mondesir
22	GK	TUN	Oussema Hanzouli
25	FW	TUN	Malek Jammel
26	DF	TUN	Omar Zouaghi
27	DF	TUN	Bilel Mgannem
28	FW	TUN	Mohamed Askri
30	DF	TUN	Haroune Kouki
31	DF	TUN	Yassine Mizouni
33	FW	TUN	Hosni Guezmir
87	MF	TUN	Yassine Nahdi

== Honours ==
- Tunisian Ligue Professionnelle 2

Champions: 2023–24
