= Boujemaa Kmiti Stadium =

Multi-purpose stadium in Béja, Tunisia

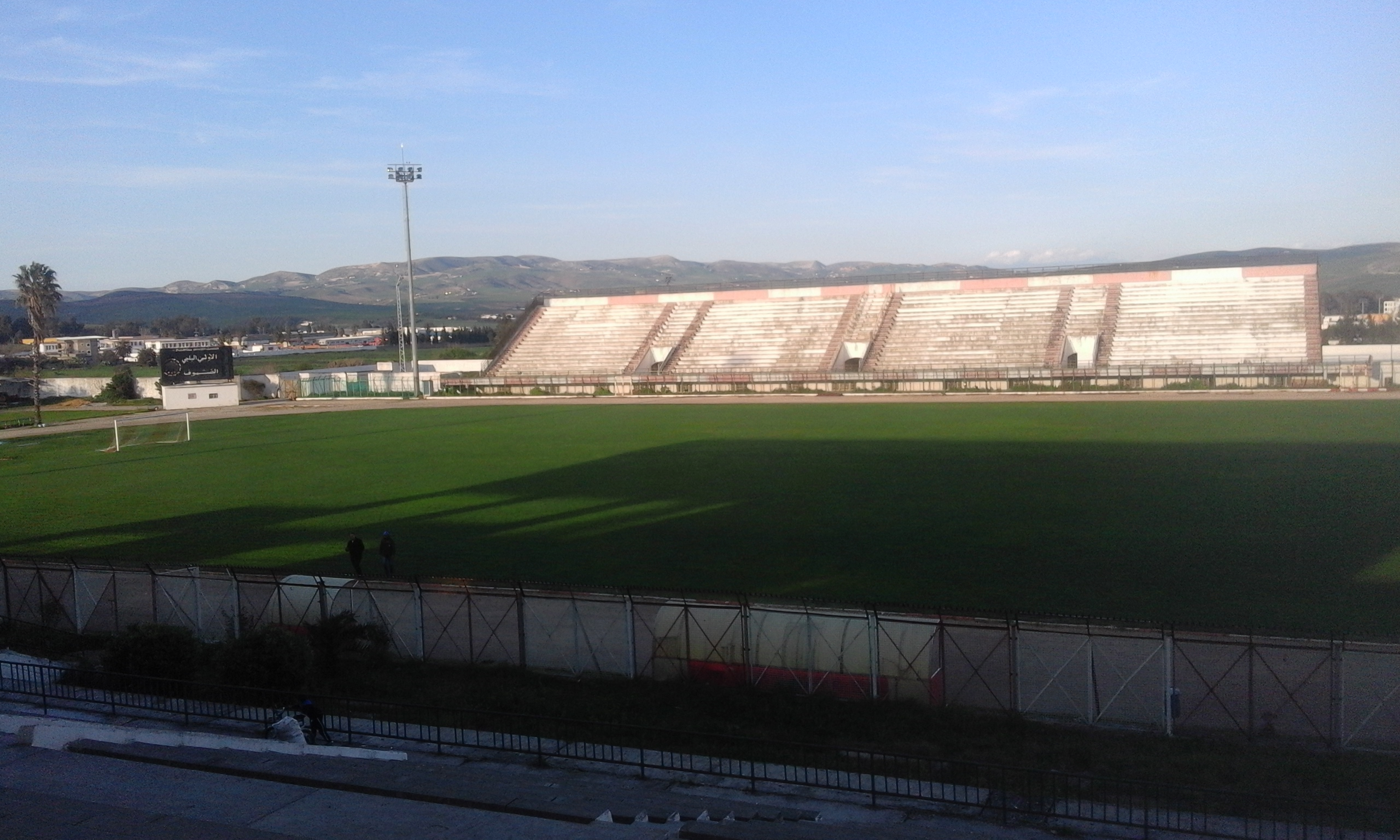
- Interactive map of Boujemaa Kmiti Stadium
- Full name: Boujemaa Kmiti Stadium
- Location: Béja, Tuinsia
- Capacity: 15,000
- Surface: Grass

Tenant
- Olympique Béja

Boujemaa Kmiti Stadium is a multi-purpose stadium located in Béja, Tunisia. The stadium is primarily used for football matches and serves as the home ground for the football club Olympique Béja. It has a capacity of 15,000 spectators. The stadium is named after Boujemaa Kmiti, a former player for Olympique Béja. Previously, the stadium was known as Stade Olympique de Béja.
