= PS Sakiet Eddaïer =

- Founded: 1965
- Ground: Sakiet Eddaïer Municipal Stadium
- Capacity: 2000
- Chairman: Lotfi Mnajja
- Coach: Yousri Ben Kahla
- League: Ligue 1
- 2025–26: Ligue 2, Group B, 1st of 16 (promoted)
Home colours	Away colours

Progrès sportif de Sakiet Eddaïer (Arabic: التقدم الرياضي بساقية الدائر), known as PS Sakiet Eddaïer or simply PSS for short ,is a Tunisian football club based in the quarter of Sakiet Eddaïer in Sfax. The club was founded in 1965 and its colours are blue and white. Their home stadium, Sakiet Eddaïer Municipal Stadium, has a capacity of 2,000 spectators.

== History ==
On 12 May 2026, PS Sakiet Eddaïer made a historical promotion to the Tunisian Ligue Professionnelle 1 after winning 2025–26 Tunisian Ligue Professionnelle 2 Group B.
