= Chedly Zouiten Stadium =

Stadium in Tunis, Tunisia

Coordinates: 36°49′44″N 10°10′12″E

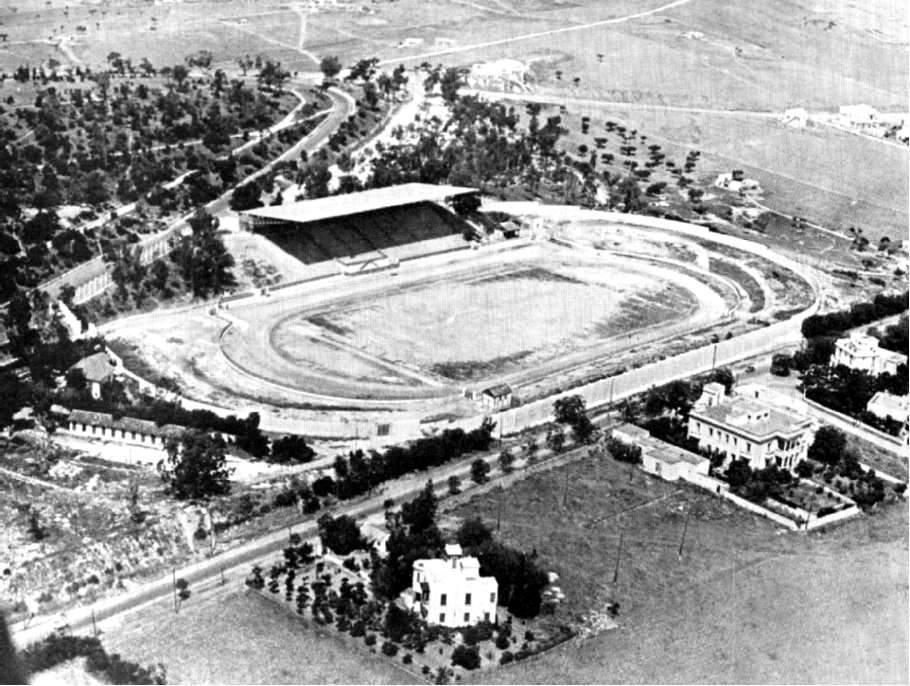
- Interactive map of Chedly Zouiten Stadium
- Former names: Stade Géo André (1942–1963)
- Location: Tunis, Tunisia
- Capacity: 18,000
- Surface: Grass

Construction
- Built: 1942
- Renovated: 2009–2012

Chedly Zouiten Stadium (Arabic: ملعب الشادلي زويتن) is a multi-purpose stadium in the Mutuelleville district of Tunis, Tunisia. It is currently used by football team JS El Omrane. The stadium holds 18,000 people.

It hosted the 1965 Africa Cup of Nations. It was renovated for two meetings of the 1994 Africa Cup of Nations. Long the main stadium in the capital, it was supplanted by the Stade El Menzah in 1967 and then by the Stade 7 November of Radès in 2001, both larger and more modern.

== Name ==
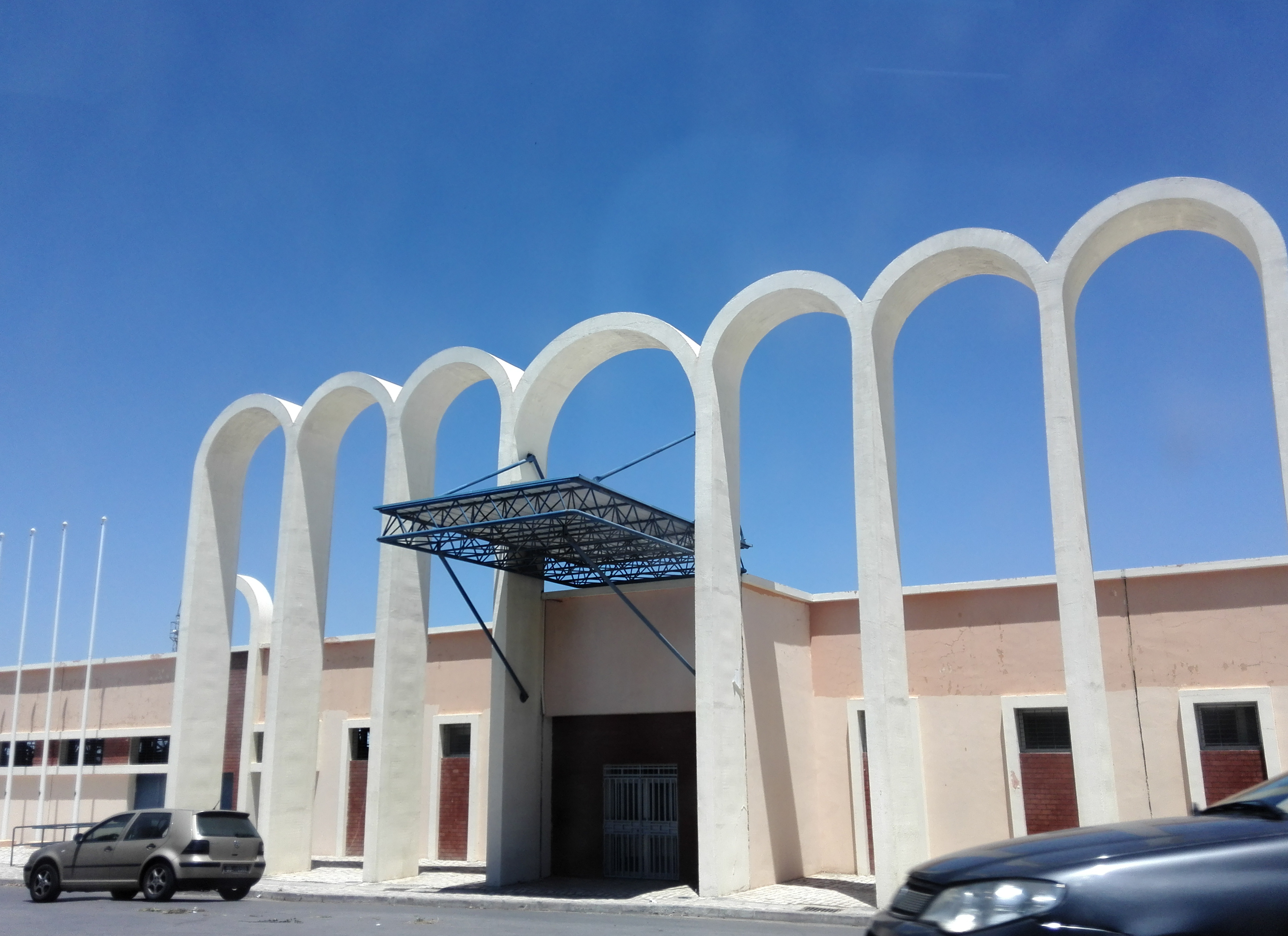
The main entrance to the stadium.

It was named as Stade Géo André, who was a French sportsman killed by German forces during the Tunisian campaign of World War II, before being renamed in honour of Chedly Zouiten, a figure of Tunisian football, after his death in 1963.

== Renovation ==
The municipality of Tunis closed it on 17 November 2006 to carry out renovation work estimated at 3.4 million dinars and initially caused by faults in the rainwater drainage channels. This cost includes the renovation of the sanitation and drainage network for rainwater, the renovation of the grandstand, the press stand, bleachers on the lawn side, changing rooms, electrical installations; the works were launched on 2 January 2009 for a period of ten months. It was not until 20 May 2012 that the stadium was finally reopened.

== Equipment ==
The stadium houses two grass football pitches, one for training and the other for national and international sports competitions, a handball field, a 400-metre track, two jumping pits, two shooting ranges and a steeple river.

== Citations ==
Preceded by Accra Sports Stadium; Accra	Africa Cup of Nations; Final Venue; 1965	Succeeded by Hailé Sélassié Stadium; Addis Ababa
