= 2018–19 Espérance Sportive de Tunis season =

Espérance Sportive de Tunis
2018–19 season
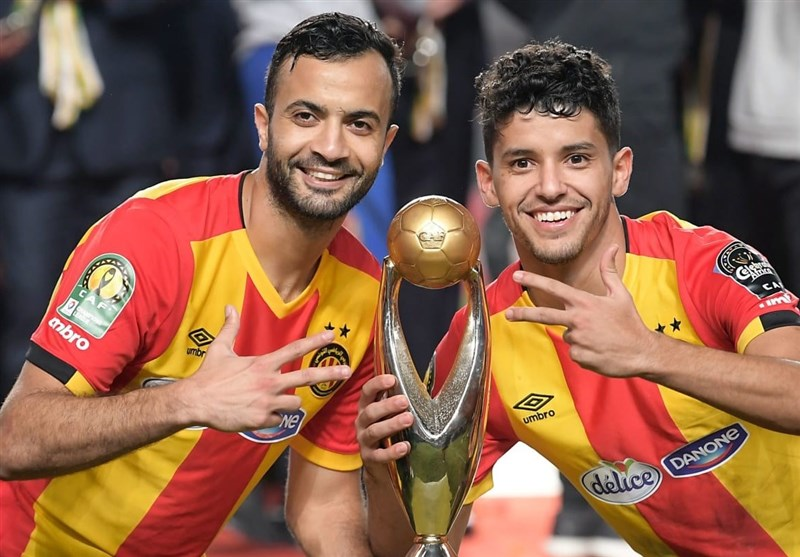
- President: Hamdi Meddeb
- Head coach: Moïne Chaâbani
- Stadium: Stade de Radès
- Ligue 1: Winners
- Tunisian Cup: Semi-finals
- Super Cup: Winners
- Champions League: 2018: Winners; 2019: Winners
- Club Championship: First round
- Club World Cup: Fifth place
- CAF Super Cup: Runners–up
- Top goalscorer: League: Taha Yassine Khenissi 10; All: Taha Yassine Khenissi 14
Home colours	Away colours

In the 2018–19 season, Espérance Sportive de Tunis competed in the Ligue 1 for the 64th season, as well as the Tunisian Cup. It was their 65th consecutive season in the top flight of Tunisian football. They competed in Ligue 1, the Champions League, Super Cup, the Arab Club Champions Cup, the FIFA Club World Cup, the CAF Super Cup and the Tunisian Cup.

== Pre-season ==
27 June 2018 Friendly	Espérance de Tunis (Tunisia)	2-0	(Algeria) USM Alger	Mutuelleville
19:00 UTC+1	Belaïli 71', 85'	Report; Live TV: None		Stadium: Stade Chedli Zouiten; Referee: Wassim Ben Salah (Tunisia)

== Competitions ==
=== Overview ===
Competition	Record								Started round	Final position / round	First match	Last match
Competition	G	W	D	L	GF	GA	GD	Win %	Started round	Final position / round	First match	Last match
Ligue 1	26	17	5	4	37	15	+22	65.38	—N/a	Winners	22 August 2018	15 June 2019
Tunisian Cup	4	2	2	0	6	3	+3	50.00	Round of 64	Semi-finals	29 January 2019	6 June 2019
Super Cup	1	1	0	0	2	1	+1	100.00	Final	Winners	1 April 2019	
CAF Super Cup	1	0	0	1	1	2	−1	0.00	Final	Runners–up	29 March 2019	
Champions League	10	6	1	3	15	10	+5	60.00	Group stage	Winners	17 July 2018	9 November 2018
Champions League	11	7	4	0	17	6	+11	63.64	Group stage	Winners	11 January 2019	31 May 2019
Club Champions Cup	2	0	2	0	3	3	+0	0.00	First round		9 August 2018	2 September 2018
FIFA Club World Cup	2	0	1	1	1	4	−3	0.00	Second round	Fifth place	15 December 2018	18 December 2018
Total	57	33	15	9	82	44	+38	57.89				

Updated to match played 3 June 2019
Source: Competitions

== League table ==
Pos	Team	Pld	W	D	L	GF	GA	GD	Pts	Qualification or relegation
1	Espérance de Tunis (C)	26	17	5	4	37	15	+22	56	Qualification for Champions League
2	Étoile du Sahel	26	15	9	2	40	17	+23	54	Qualification for Champions League
3	Club Sfaxien	26	14	10	2	34	15	+19	52	Qualification for Confederation Cup (Note: Étoile du Sahel and CS Sfaxien are Tunisian Cup finalists.)
4	Union de Ben Guerdane	26	10	8	8	22	21	+1	38	Qualification for Confederation Cup
5	Club Africain	26	11	4	11	22	24	−2	37	

Source: Ligue 1
Rules for classification: 1) Points; 2) Head-to-head points; 3) Head-to-head goal difference; 4) Goal difference; 5) Goals scored; 6) Fair-play points; 7) Play-off.
(C) Champions

=== Results summary ===
Overall								Home						Away					
Pld	W	D	L	GF	GA	GD	Pts	W	D	L	GF	GA	GD	W	D	L	GF	GA	GD
26	17	5	4	37	15	+22	56	9	3	1	22	6	+16	8	2	3	15	9	+6

Last updated: 22 April 2018.
Source: Competitive matches

=== Results by round ===
Round	1	2	3	4	5	6	7	8	9	10	11	12	13	14	15	16	17	18	19	20	21	22	23	24	25	26
Ground	H	H	A	A	H	A	H	A	H	A	H	H	A	A	A	H	H	A	H	A	H	A	H	A	A	H
Result	W	D	L	W	W	W	W	W	D	W	W	W	D	W	W	W	W	W	D	W	W	D	W	L	L	L
Position	2	1	3	5	4	3	2	2	2	1	1	1	1	1	1	1	1	1	1	1	1	1	1	1	1	1

Updated to match(es) played on 22 April 2019. Source: Competitive matches
A = Away; H = Home; W = Win; D = Draw; L = Loss

=== Matches ===
Win Draw Loss

22 August 2018 Round 1	Espérance de Tunis	2–0	US Tataouine	Rades
16:00	Mbarki 7'; Khenissi 43'	Soccerway report		Stadium: Stade Olympique de Radès; Referee: Mohamed Chaabene

26 September 2018 Round 2	Espérance de Tunis	1–1	Stade Tunisien	Rades
15:30	Khenissi 13'	Soccerway report	Sfaxi 64'	Stadium: Stade Olympique de Radès; Referee: Slim Belkhouas

8 October 2018 Round 3	CS Sfaxien	2–0	Espérance de Tunis	Sfax
15:00	Harzi 32'; Chaouat 90+4'	Soccerway report		Stadium: Stade Taïeb Mhiri; Referee: Mahmoud El Banna (Egypt)

28 October 2018 Round 4	CS Hammam-Lif	0–2	Espérance de Tunis	Rades
14:30		Soccerway report	Jouini 21'; Badri 33'	Stadium: Stade Olympique de Radès; Referee: Amir Loussif

14 November 2018 Round 5	Espérance de Tunis	3–0	AS Gabès	Rades
14:00	Rejaibi 20'; Badri 43'; Dhaouadi 52'	Soccerway report		Stadium: Stade Olympique de Radès; Referee: Nidhal Ltaïef

18 November 2018 Round 6	ES Métlaoui	1–2	Espérance de Tunis	Tunis
14:00	Diarra 95'	Soccerway report	Khenissi 47'; Badri 90' (pen.)	Stadium: Stade El Menzah; Referee: Oussama Razgallah

21 November 2018 Round 7	Espérance de Tunis	1–0	US Monastir	Rades
14:00	Larbi 84'	Soccerway report		Stadium: Stade Olympique de Radès; Referee: Walid Jridi

25 November 2018 Round 8	Stade Tunisien	0–1	Espérance de Tunis	Rades
14:00		Soccerway report	Khenissi 11'	Stadium: Stade Olympique de Radès; Referee: Rochdi Guezguez

28 November 2018 Round 9	Espérance de Tunis	0–0	Étoile du Sahel	Rades
14:00		Soccerway report		Stadium: Stade Olympique de Radès; Referee: Amine Omar (Egypt)

2 December 2018 Round 10	JS Kairouan	0–2	Espérance de Tunis	Kairouan
14:00		Soccerway report	Khenissi 45'; Fedaa 66'	Stadium: Stade Hamda Laouani; Referee: Maher Harrabi

6 January 2019 Round 11	Espérance de Tunis	2–1	Club Africain	Monastir
14:00	Khenissi 16', 56'	Soccerway report	Chamakhi 27'	Stadium: Stade Mustapha Ben Jannet; Referee: Mohamed Adel (Egypt)

15 January 2019 Round 12	Espérance de Tunis	2–0	US Ben Guerdane	Tunis
14:00	Rejaibi 24'; Jouini 86'	Soccerway report		Stadium: Stade El Menzah; Referee: Ameur Chouchane

23 January 2019 Round 13	CA Bizertin	2–2	Espérance de Tunis	Bizerte
14:00	Ouattara 48'; Cissé 88'	Soccerway report	Khenissi 18', 81'	Stadium: Stade 15 Octobre; Referee: Gehad Grisha (Egypt)

7 February 2019 Round 14	US Tataouine	0–1	Espérance de Tunis	Tataouine
14:00		Soccerway report	Jouini 83' (pen.)	Stadium: Stade Néjib Khattab; Referee: Yosri Bouali

2 March 2019 Round 15	Stade Tunisien	1–2	Espérance de Tunis	Le Bardo
14:30	Mbenza 43'	Soccerway report	Elhouni 49'; Badri 66'	Stadium: Stade Hédi Enneifer; Referee: Mohamed Chaaben

13 March 2019 Round 16	Espérance de Tunis	2–1	CS Sfaxien	Rades
14:30	Khenissi 28'; Bguir 36'	Soccerway report	55' Marzouki	Stadium: Stade Olympique de Radès; Referee: Gehad Grisha (Egypt)

17 April 2019 Round 17	Espérance de Tunis	1–0	CS Hammam-Lif	Rades
15:00	Fedaa 20'	Soccerway report		Stadium: Stade Olympique de Radès; Referee: Naïm Hosni

10 April 2019 Round 18	AS Gabès	0–1	Espérance de Tunis	Rades
15:00		Soccerway report	Elhouni 37'	Stadium: Stade Olympique de Radès; Referee: Amir Ayadi

24 February 2019 Round 19	Espérance de Tunis	1–1	ES Métlaoui	Rades
14:00	Badri 61'	Soccerway report	Diarra 5'	Stadium: Stade Olympique de Radès; Referee: Walid Jridi

21 April 2019 Round 20	US Monastir	0–1	Espérance de Tunis	Monastir
15:00		Soccerway report	Elhouni 57'	Stadium: Stade Mustapha Ben Jannet; Referee: Nidhal Letaïef

15 May 2019 Round 21	Espérance de Tunis	2–0	Stade Gabèsien	Rades
15:00	Bguir 10'; Lokosa 51'	Soccerway report		Stadium: Stade Olympique de Radès; Referee: Haythem Kossaï

18 May 2019 Round 22	Étoile du Sahel	0–0	Espérance de Tunis	Sousse
15:00		Soccerway report		Stadium: Stade Olympique de Sousse; Referee: Mohamed Maarouf (Egypt)

3 June 2019 Round 23	Espérance de Tunis	4–0	JS Kairouan	Rades
15:00	Rejaibi 35'; Jouini 65' (pen.); Bguir 71', 85'	Soccerway report		Stadium: Stade Olympique de Radès; Referee: Oussama Ben Ishak

9 June 2019 Round 24	Club Africain	2–1	Espérance de Tunis	Rades
16:00	Chamakhi 30'; Haddad 56'	Soccerway report	Bguir 44'	Stadium: Stade Olympique de Radès; Referee: Rochdi Guezguez

12 June 2019 Round 25	US Ben Guerdane	1–0	Espérance de Tunis	Ben Guerdane
16:00	Zoghlami 35' (pen.)	Soccerway report		Stadium: Stade du 7 Mars; Referee: Nidhal Ltaïef

15 June 2019 Round 26	Espérance de Tunis	1–2	CA Bizertin	Rades
16:00	Mejri 45'	Soccerway report	Habbassi 4'; Diarra 22'	Stadium: Stade Olympique de Radès; Referee: Dorsaf Ganoiati

== Tunisian Cup ==
29 January 2019 Round of 32	AS Gabès	0–1 (a.e.t.)	Espérance de Tunis	Gabès
14:00			Badri 95'	Stadium: Stade Municipal de Gabès; Referee: Nidhal Ltaïef

22 March 2019 Round of 16	AS Djerba	1–1 (a.e.t.) (7–8 p)	Espérance de Tunis	Djerba
14:15	Ben Romdhane 72'	Report	Ghabbarou 57' (o.g.)	Stadium: Stade de Houmt Souk; Referee: Mejdi Belhadj Ali

11 May 2019 Quarter-finals	Espérance de Tunis	3–1	US Monastir	Rades
14:30	Belaïli 24'; Lokosa 43'; Badri 76'	Report	85' Kabou	Stadium: Stade Olympique de Radès; Referee: Ahmed Al Ghandour (Egypt)

6 June 2019 Semi-finals	CS Sfaxien	1–1 (a.e.t.) (4–2 p)	Espérance de Tunis	Sfax
16:00	Chaouat 74'	Report	60' Khenissi	Stadium: Stade Taïeb Mhiri; Referee: Aymen Omar (Egypt)

== Tunisian Super Cup ==
1 April 2019	Espérance de Tunis	2–1	CA Bizertin	Doha, Qatar
20:00	Badri 13'; Khenissi 16'	Report	Darragi 34' (pen.)	Stadium: Abdullah bin Khalifa Stadium; Referee: Youssef Serairi

== CAF Super Cup ==
29 March 2019	Espérance de Tunis (Tunisia)	1–2	(Morocco) Raja Casablanca	Al Rayyan, Qatar
19:00 UTC+3	Belaïli 57'	Report	Hafidi 22'; Banoun 64'	Stadium: Thani bin Jassim Stadium; Referee: Bamlak Tessema Weyesa (Ethiopia)

== FIFA Club World Cup ==
15 December 2018 Second round	Espérance de Tunis (Tunisia)	0–3	(United Arab Emirates) Al-Ain	Al Ain
20:30		Report	Ahmed 2'; El Shahat 16'; Al-Ahbabi 60'	Stadium: Hazza bin Zayed Stadium; Attendance: 21,333; Referee: Jair Marrufo (United States)

18 December 2018 Match for fifth place	Espérance de Tunis (Tunisia)	1–1 (6–5 p)	(Mexico) Guadalajara	Al Ain
17:30	Belaïli 38' (pen.)	Report	Sandoval 5' (pen.)	Stadium: Hazza bin Zayed Stadium; Attendance: 5,883; Referee: Matthew Conger (New Zealand)
	Penalties
	Belaïli (penalty missed); Machani (penalty scored); Chemmam (penalty scored); Bguir (penalty missed); Khenissi (penalty scored); Derbali (penalty scored); Coulibaly (penalty scored); Dhaouadi (penalty scored)		(penalty scored) Zaldívar; (penalty missed) Marín; (penalty scored) Godínez; (penalty missed) Van Rankin; (penalty scored) Salcido; (penalty scored) Pineda; (penalty scored) Ponce; (penalty missed) Brizuela

== 2018 Champions League ==
=== Group stage ===
==== Group A ====
Pos	Team	Pld	W	D	L	GF	GA	GD	Pts	Qualification	AHL	EST	KCC	ROL
1	(Egypt) Al Ahly	6	4	1	1	9	5	+4	13	Quarter-finals	—	0–0	4–3	3–0
2	(Tunisia) Espérance de Tunis	6	3	2	1	8	4	+4	11	Quarter-finals	0–1	—	3–2	4–1
3	(Uganda) KCCA	6	2	0	4	8	9	−1	6		2–0	0–1	—	1–0
4	(Botswana) Township Rollers	6	1	1	4	2	9	−7	4		0–1	0–0	1–0	—

Source: CAF
Rules for classification: Group stage tiebreakers

17 July 2018 3	Espérance de Tunis (Tunisia)	3–2	(Uganda) KCCA	Radès
20:00 UTC+1	Badri 30'; Bguir 33'; Mejri 82'	Report	Nunda 18'; Shaban 22'	Stadium: Stade Olympique de Radès; Referee: Noureddine El Jaafari (Morocco)

28 July 2018 4	KCCA (Uganda)	0–1	(Tunisia) Espérance de Tunis	Kira
16:00 UTC+3		Report	Jouini 41'	Stadium: Mandela National Stadium; Referee: Janny Sikazwe (Zambia)

17 August 2018 5	Espérance de Tunis (Tunisia)	0–1	(Egypt) Al-Ahly	Radès
20:00 UTC+1		Report	Azaro 32'	Stadium: Stade Olympique de Radès; Referee: Eric Otogo-Castane (Gabon)

28 August 2018 6	Township Rollers (Botswana)	0–0	(Tunisia) Espérance de Tunis	Gaborone
21:00 UTC+2		Report		Stadium: Botswana National Stadium; Referee: Victor Gomes (South Africa)

=== knockout stage ===
==== Quarter-finals ====
15 September 2018	Espérance de Tunis (Tunisia)	2–1	(Tunisia) Étoile du Sahel	Radès
20:00 UTC+1	Dhaouadi 2'; Derbali 77'	Report	Jemal 28'	Stadium: Stade Olympique de Radès; Attendance: 30,000; Referee: Bamlak Tessema Weyesa (Ethiopia)

21 September 2018	Étoile du Sahel (Tunisia)	0–1	(Tunisia) Espérance de Tunis	Sousse
17:00 UTC+1		Report	Coulibaly 87'	Stadium: Stade Olympique de Sousse; Attendance: 25,000; Referee: Victor Gomes (South Africa)

==== Semi-finals ====
2 October 2018	1º de Agosto (Angola)	1–0	(Tunisia) Espérance de Tunis	Luanda
17:00 UTC+1	Buá 82'	Report		Stadium: Estádio 11 de Novembro; Attendance: 25,000; Referee: Maguette N'Diaye (Senegal)

23 October 2018	Espérance de Tunis (Tunisia)	4–2	(Angola) 1º de Agosto	Radès
17:00 UTC+1	Belaïli 16' (pen.); Yacoubi 27'; Jouini 73'; Badri 85'	Report	Geraldo 8'; Bokamba 64'	Stadium: Stade Olympique de Radès; Attendance: 45,000; Referee: Janny Sikazwe (Zambia)

==== Final ====
2 November 2018	Al-Ahly (Egypt)	3–1	(Tunisia) Espérance de Tunis	Alexandria
21:00 UTC+2	Soliman 34' (pen.), 77' (pen.); El Solia 58'	Report	Belaïli 64' (pen.)	Stadium: Borg El Arab Stadium; Attendance: 60,000; Referee: Mehdi Abid Charef (Algeria)

9 November 2018	Espérance de Tunis (Tunisia)	3–0	(Egypt) Al-Ahly	Radès
20:00 UTC+1	Bguir 45+1', 54'; Badri 86'	Report		Stadium: Stade Olympique de Radès; Attendance: 60,000; Referee: Bamlak Tessema Weyesa (Ethiopia)

== 2019 Champions League ==
=== Group stage ===
==== Group B ====
Pos	Team	Pld	W	D	L	GF	GA	GD	Pts	Qualification	EST	HOR	ORL	PLA
1	(Tunisia) Espérance de Tunis	6	4	2	0	9	2	+7	14	Quarter-finals	—	2–0	2–0	2–0
2	(Guinea) Horoya	6	3	1	2	6	7	−1	10	Quarter-finals	1–1	—	2–1	2–0
3	(South Africa) Orlando Pirates	6	1	3	2	6	6	0	6		0–0	3–0	—	2–2
4	(Zimbabwe) FC Platinum	6	0	2	4	3	9	−6	2		1–2	0–1	0–0	—

Source: CAF
Rules for classification: Group stage tiebreakers

11 January 2019 1	Horoya (Guinea)	1–1	(Tunisia) Espérance de Tunis	Conakry
16:00 UTC+0	Mandela 67'	Report	Badri 90+3'	Stadium: Stade du 28 Septembre; Referee: El Fadil Mohamed (Sudan)

18 January 2019 2	Espérance de Tunis (Tunisia)	2–0	(Zimbabwe) FC Platinum	Tunis
14:00 UTC+1	Khenissi 24', 65'	Report		Stadium: Stade El Menzah; Attendance: 0 (Note: The Espérance de Tunis v FC Platinum and Espérance de Tunis v Orlando Pirates matches were played behind closed doors due to crowd trouble during the Espérance de Tunis v Al-Ahly match (second leg of the 2018 CAF Champions League Final).); Referee: Bakary Gassama (Gambia)

2 February 2019 3	Orlando Pirates (South Africa)	0–0	(Tunisia) Espérance de Tunis	Johannesburg
21:00 UTC+2		Report		Stadium: Orlando Stadium; Referee: Bamlak Tessema Weyesa (Ethiopia)

12 February 2019 4	Espérance de Tunis (Tunisia)	2–0	(South Africa) Orlando Pirates	Tunis
14:00 UTC+1	Badri 16'; Jouini 89'	Report		Stadium: Stade El Menzah; Attendance: 0 Referee: Thierry Nkurunziza (Burundi)

8 March 2019 5	Espérance de Tunis (Tunisia)	2–0	(Guinea) Horoya	Radès
20:00 UTC+1	Assoko 23' (o.g.); Kom 83'	Report		Stadium: Stade Olympique de Radès; Referee: Hélder Martins de Carvalho (Angola)

16 March 2019 6	FC Platinum (Zimbabwe)	1–2	(Tunisia) Espérance de Tunis	Bulawayo
15:00 UTC+2	Sadiki 62'	Report	Meskini 8'; Rjaïbi 83'	Stadium: Barbourfields Stadium; Referee: Joshua Bondo (Botswana)

=== knockout stage ===
==== Quarter-finals ====
6 April 2019	CS Constantine (Algeria)	2–3	(Tunisia) Espérance de Tunis	Constantine
20:00 UTC+1	Djabout 49'; Yettou 71'	Report	Belaïli 6' (pen.); Coulibaly 47'; Yacoubi 74'	Stadium: Stade Mohamed Hamlaoui; Referee: Gehad Grisha (Egypt)

13 April 2019	Espérance de Tunis (Tunisia)	3–1	(Algeria) CS Constantine	Radès
20:00 UTC+1	Bguir 23', 27'; Kom 86'	Report	Bahamboula 62'	Stadium: Stade Olympique de Radès; Referee: Noureddine El Jaafari (Morocco)

==== Semi-finals ====
27 April 2019	Espérance de Tunis (Tunisia)	1–0	(Democratic Republic of the Congo) TP Mazembe	Radès
17:00 UTC+1	Belaïli 51'	Report		Stadium: Stade Olympique de Radès; Referee: Bakary Gassama (Gambia)

4 May 2019	TP Mazembe (Democratic Republic of the Congo)	0–0	(Tunisia) Espérance de Tunis	Lubumbashi
15:00 UTC+2		Report		Stadium: Stade TP Mazembe; Referee: Victor Gomes (South Africa)

==== Final ====
Espérance de Tunis were initially declared winners following a refusal by Wydad Casablanca to resume play following an issue with VAR, though CAF later ruled the second leg must be replayed in a neutral venue to decide the champions. However, the decision to order a replay was thrown out by the Court of Arbitration for Sport (CAS), who told the Confederation of African Football (CAF) to refer the case to its proper disciplinary structures for a decision, and on 7 August 2019, Espérance de Tunis were declared winners for a second time.

24 May 2019	Wydad Casablanca (Morocco)	1–1	(Tunisia) Espérance de Tunis	Rabat
22:00 UTC+0	Comara 79'	Report	Coulibaly 44'	Stadium: Prince Moulay Abdellah Stadium; Referee: Gehad Grisha (Egypt)

31 May 2019	Espérance de Tunis (Tunisia)	Abandoned (Note: With the score 1–0 in favor of Espérance de Tunis in the 59th minute, Walid El Karti scored a goal for Wydad Casablanca which was subsequently ruled offside by the linesman. Due to a failure of the video assistant referee system, a review of the decision could not be conducted. Believing the goal was valid, Wydad Casablanca protested the decision and the match was interrupted. After 80 minutes of stoppage, the referee ruled the match as a forfeit by Wydad Casablanca and awarded to Espérance de Tunis, securing them the CAF Champions League title. However, on 5 June 2019 the CAF Executive Committee ordered a replay of the second leg at a neutral venue, requiring Espérance de Tunis to return the trophy and medals. However, the decision to order a replay of the second leg was thrown out by the Court of Arbitration for Sport (CAS) on 31 July 2019, who required CAF to refer the case to its proper disciplinary structures for a decision. On 7 August 2019, Espérance de Tunis were again officially declared champions after the CAF Disciplinary Board ruled that Wydad Casablanca "is considered to have lost the game in the 2nd leg.")	(Morocco) Wydad Casablanca	Radès
22:00 UTC+1	Belaïli 41'	Report		Stadium: Stade Olympique de Radès; Attendance: 60,000; Referee: Bakary Gassama (Gambia)

== Club Championship Cup ==
=== First round ===
9 August 2018	Al-Ittihad Alexandria (Egypt)	1–1	(Tunisia) Espérance de Tunis	Alexandria
19:00 UTC+2	Cissé 62'	Report	Mejri 70'	Stadium: Alexandria Stadium; Attendance: 7,000; Referee: Mohammed Al Hoish (Saudi Arabia)

2 September 2018	Espérance de Tunis (Tunisia)	2–2	(Egypt) Al-Ittihad Alexandria	Tunis
20:00 UTC+1	Belaili 7'; Kom 52'		Kamar 20'; Gedo 44'	Stadium: Stade Olympique de Radès; Referee: Mohanad Qassim (Iraq)

== Squad information ==
=== Playing statistics ===
No.	Pos	Nat	Player	Total		Ligue 1		Tunisian Cup		Champions League		Championship Cup		Other (Note: Includes the Tunisian Super Cup, CAF Super Cup and FIFA Club World Cup)	
No.	Pos	Nat	Player	Apps	Goals	Apps	Goals	Apps	Goals	Apps	Goals	Apps	Goals	Apps	Goals
Goalkeepers
1	GK	(Tunisia) TUN	Moez Ben Cherifia	22	0	10	0	3	0	5	0	2	0	2	0
19	GK	(Tunisia) TUN	Rami Jridi	27	0	17	0	1	0	7	0	0	0	2	0
23	GK	(Tunisia) TUN	Ali Jemal	0	0	0	0	0	0	0	0	0	0	0	0
Defenders
2	DF	(Tunisia) TUN	Ali Machani	14	0	10	0	1	0	1	0	0	0	2	0
3	DF	(Tunisia) TUN	Aymen Mahmoud	17	0	13	0	1	0	1	0	1	0	1	0
5	DF	(Tunisia) TUN	Chamseddine Dhaouadi	28	1	11	1	3	0	9	0	1	0	4	0
6	DF	(Tunisia) TUN	Mohamed Ali Yacoubi	21	1	10	0	2	0	8	1	0	0	1	0
12	DF	(Tunisia) TUN	Khalil Chemmam	24	0	10	0	3	0	7	0	2	0	2	0
13	DF	(Tunisia) TUN	Raed Fedaa	10	0	9	0	0	0	1	0	0	0	0	0
20	DF	(Tunisia) TUN	Ayman Ben Mohamed	25	0	8	0	1	0	11	0	1	0	4	0
22	DF	(Tunisia) TUN	Sameh Derbali	26	0	11	0	3	0	7	0	2	0	3	0
24	DF	(Tunisia) TUN	Iheb Mbarki	22	1	17	1	1	0	2	0	0	0	2	0
26	DF	(Tunisia) TUN	Houcine Rabii	21	0	15	0	2	0	2	0	1	0	1	0
Midfielders
15	MF	(Ivory Coast) CIV	Fousseny Coulibaly	36	2	17	0	2	0	11	2	2	0	4	0
17	MF	(Tunisia) TUN	Maher Ben Sghaïer	6	0	3	0	1	0	0	0	2	0	0	0
18	MF	(Tunisia) TUN	Saad Bguir	30	7	17	5	4	0	6	2	0	0	3	0
25	MF	(Tunisia) TUN	Ghailene Chaalali	29	0	15	0	2	0	9	0	1	0	2	0
27	MF	(Tunisia) TUN	Mohamed Ali Ben Romdhane	12	0	9	0	2	0	1	0	0	0	0	0
28	MF	(Tunisia) TUN	Mohamed Amine Meskini	27	0	16	0	3	0	7	0	0	0	1	0
30	MF	(Cameroon) CMR	Franck Kom	33	3	17	0	1	0	10	2	2	1	3	0
	MF	(Tunisia) TUN	Youssef Mosrati	4	0	3	0	1	0	0	0	0	0	0	0
Forwards
7	FW	(Tunisia) TUN	Adem Rejaibi	13	4	10	3	0	0	2	1	0	0	1	0
8	FW	(Tunisia) TUN	Anice Badri	32	10	13	5	3	2	11	2	2	0	3	1
9	FW	(Tunisia) TUN	Bilel Mejri	22	2	15	1	2	0	2	0	2	1	1	0
10	FW	(Algeria) ALG	Youcef Belaïli	29	7	11	0	2	1	11	3	1	1	4	2
11	FW	(Tunisia) TUN	Taha Yassine Khenissi	32	14	14	10	1	1	11	2	2	0	4	1
14	FW	(Tunisia) TUN	Haythem Jouini	30	5	16	4	3	0	7	1	2	0	2	0
16	FW	(Tunisia) TUN	Zied Berrima	6	0	3	0	2	0	1	0	0	0	0	0
17	MF	(Libya) LBA	Hamdou Elhouni	18	3	8	3	1	0	7	0	0	0	2	0
21	FW	(Algeria) ALG	Tayeb Meziani	15	0	8	0	3	0	4	0	0	0	0	0
29	FW	(Nigeria) NGR	Junior Lokosa	11	2	6	1	1	1	4	0	0	0	0	0
Players transferred out during the season
	FW	(Tunisia) TUN	Mohamed Ali Moncer	1	0	0	0	0	0	0	0	1	0	0	0

Source: fr.soccerway.com

=== Goalscorers ===
Includes all competitive matches. The list is sorted alphabetically by surname when total goals are equal.

No.	Nat.	Player	Pos.	Ligue 1	Cup	Super Cup	CCL 1	ACL 4	CAF Super Cup	Club World Cup	TOTAL
	(Tunisia)	Taha Yassine Khenissi	FW	10	1	1	2	0	0	0	14
	(Tunisia)	Anice Badri	MF	5	2	1	5	0	0	0	13
	(Tunisia)	Saad Bguir	MF	5	0	0	5	0	0	0	10
	(Algeria)	Youcef Belaïli	MF	0	1	0	7	1	1	1	9
	(Tunisia)	Haythem Jouini	FW	4	0	0	2	0	0	0	7
	(Tunisia)	Edem Rjaïbi	MF	3	0	0	1	0	0	0	4
	(Cameroon)	Franck Kom	MF	0	0	0	2	1	0	0	3
	(Libya)	Hamdou Elhouni	MF	3	0	0	0	0	0	0	3
	(Ivory Coast)	Fousseny Coulibaly	MF	0	0	0	3	0	0	0	3
	(Tunisia)	Bilel Mejri	FW	1	0	0	1	1	0	0	3
	(Tunisia)	Chamseddine Dhaouadi	DF	1	0	0	1	0	0	0	2
	(Tunisia)	Mohamed Ali Yaakoubi	DF	0	0	0	2	0	0	0	2
	(Tunisia)	Raed Fedaa	MF	2	0	0	0	0	0	0	2
	(Nigeria)	Junior Lokosa	FW	1	1	0	0	0	0	0	2
	(Tunisia)	Iheb Mbarki	DF	1	0	0	0	0	0	0	1
	(Tunisia)	Sameh Derbali	DF	0	0	0	0	0	0	0	1
	(Tunisia)	Mohamed Larbi	MF	1	0	0	0	0	0	0	1
	(Tunisia)	Mohamed Amine Meskini	MF	0	0	0	1	0	0	0	1
Own Goals				0	1	0	0	0	0	0	0
Totals				37	6	2	32	3	1	1	82

== Transfers ==
=== In ===
Date	Pos	Player	From club	Transfer fee	Source
13 June 2018	GK	(Tunisia) Rami Jridi	CS Sfaxien	Free transfer	
13 June 2018	DF	(Tunisia) Aymen Mahmoud	Stade Gabèsien	Free transfer	
2 August 2018	DF	(Tunisia) Mohamed Ali Yacoubi	(France) US Quevilly-Rouen	Free transfer	
14 August 2018	FW	(Tunisia) Mohamed Larbi	(France) Tours FC	Free transfer	
9 December 2018	FW	(Algeria) Tayeb Meziani	(Algeria) Paradou AC	Free transfer	
14 January 2019	FW	(Nigeria) Junior Lokosa	(Nigeria) Kano Pillars	Free transfer	
15 January 2019	FW	(Libya) Hamdou Elhouni	(Portugal) Aves	Free transfer	

=== Out ===
Date	Pos	Player	To club	Transfer fee	Source
1 July 2018	DF	(Tunisia) Montassar Talbi	(Turkey) Çaykur Rizespor	Free transfer	
13 July 2018	MF	(Tunisia) Mondher Guesmi	US Ben Guerdane	Loan for one year	
1 August 2018	MF	(Tunisia) Saber Hammami	Stade Gabèsien	Loan for one year	
1 August 2018	MF	(Tunisia) Khemaïes Maaouani	Stade Gabèsien	Loan for one year	
1 August 2018	MF	(Tunisia) Malek Charfi	Stade Gabèsien	Loan for one year	
1 August 2018	MF	(Benin) Chamssi Deen Chaona	Stade Gabèsien	Loan for one year	
15 September 2018	FW	(Tunisia) Aziz Chtioui	US Monastir	Loan for one year	
15 September 2018	FW	(Tunisia) Mohamed Ali Moncer	CS Sfaxien	Free transfer	
