= 2017–18 Espérance Sportive de Tunis season =

Espérance Sportive de Tunis
2017–18 season
- President: Hamdi Meddeb
- Head coach: Faouzi Benzarti (until 24 December 2017); Mondher Kebaier (from 4 January 2018) (until 6 February 2018); Khaled Ben Yahia (from 7 February 2018)
- Stadium: Stade de Radès
- Ligue 1: Winners
- Tunisian Cup: Round of 32
- Champions League: 2017: Quarter-finals; 2018: Winners
- Club Championship: Winners
- Top goalscorer: League: Taha Yassine Khenissi 8 All: Taha Yassine Khenissi 8
Home colours	Away colours

In the 2017–18 season, Espérance Sportive de Tunis competed in the Ligue 1 for the 63rd season, as well as the Tunisian Cup. It was their 65th consecutive season in the top flight of Tunisian football. They competed in Ligue 1, the Champions League, the Arab Club Champions Cup and the Tunisian Cup.

== Squad list ==
Players and squad numbers last updated on 18 November 2017.
Note: Flags indicate national team as has been defined under FIFA eligibility rules. Players may hold more than one non-FIFA nationality.

No.	Nat.	Position	Name	Date of Birth (Age)	Signed from
Goalkeepers
1	(Tunisia)	GK	Moez Ben Cherifia	24 June 1991 (aged 26)	(Tunisia) Youth system
23	(Tunisia)	GK	Ali Jemal	9 June 1990 (aged 27)	(Tunisia) US Ben Guerdane
Defenders
2	(Tunisia)		Malek Charfi	1 February 1997 (aged 20)	(Tunisia) ES Métlaoui
2	(Tunisia)		Ali Machani	12 July 1993 (aged 24)	(Tunisia) CA Bizerte
3	(Tunisia)		Ferid Matri	16 January 1994 (aged 23)	(Switzerland) FC Le Mont
4	(Tunisia)		Montassar Talbi	26 May 1998 (aged 19)	(Tunisia) Youth system
5	(Tunisia)		Chamseddine Dhaouadi	15 January 1987 (aged 30)	(Tunisia) Étoile Sportive du Sahel
12	(Tunisia)		Khalil Chemmam	24 July 1987 (aged 30)	(Portugal) Vitória de Guimarães
22	(Tunisia)		Sameh Derbali	23 November 1986 (aged 31)	(Libya) Al Ahli SC
24	(Tunisia)		Iheb Mbarki	14 February 1992 (aged 25)	(France) Thonon Évian
Midfielders
3	(Benin)		Chamseddine Chaona	24 October 1996 (aged 21)	(Tunisia) Youth system
7	(Tunisia)		Adam Rejaibi	5 April 1994 (aged 23)	(Tunisia) CA Bizerte
10	(Tunisia)		Änis Ben-Hatira	18 July 1988 (aged 29)	(Turkey) Gaziantepspor
15	(Ivory Coast)		Fousseny Coulibaly	10 August 1989 (aged 28)	(Tunisia) Stade Tunisien
17	(Tunisia)		Maher Ben Sghaïer	22 April 1996 (aged 21)	(Tunisia) CA Bizerte
18	(Tunisia)		Saad Bguir	22 March 1994 (aged 23)	(Tunisia) Stade Gabèsien
20	(Tunisia)		Ayman Ben Mohamed	8 December 1994 (aged 23)	(Republic of Ireland) Bohemian
21	(Tunisia)		Mohamed Ali Moncer	28 April 1991 (aged 26)	(Tunisia) CS Sfaxien
25	(Tunisia)		Ghailene Chaalali	28 February 1994 (aged 23)	(Tunisia) Youth system
26	(Tunisia)		Houcine Rabii	8 November 1991 (aged 26)	(Tunisia) ES Zarzis
28	(Tunisia)		Mohamed Amine Meskini	5 June 1997 (aged 20)	(Tunisia) CS Hammam-Lif
30	(Cameroon)		Franck Kom	18 September 1991 (aged 26)	(Germany) Karlsruher SC
	(Tunisia)		Mohamed Ali Ben Romdhane	6 September 1999 (aged 18)	(Tunisia) Youth system
	(Tunisia)		Ferjani Sassi	18 March 1992 (aged 25)	(France) FC Metz
Forwards
8	(Tunisia)		Anice Badri	18 September 1990 (aged 27)	(Belgium) Royal Excel Mouscron
9	(Tunisia)		Bilel Mejri	6 February 1996 (aged 21)	(Tunisia) Youth system
11	(Algeria)		Youcef Belaïli	14 March 1992 (aged 25)	(France) Angers SCO
14	(Tunisia)		Haythem Jouini	7 May 1993 (aged 24)	(Spain) CD Tenerife
29	(Tunisia)		Taha Yassine Khenissi	6 January 1992 (aged 25)	(Tunisia) CS Sfaxien
	(Nigeria)		Michael Eneramo	26 November 1985 (aged 32)	(Saudi Arabia) Ettifaq FC
	(Tunisia)		Fakhreddine Ben Youssef	23 June 1991 (aged 26)	(Tunisia) CS Sfaxien

== Pre-season ==
8 October 2017 Friendly	AS Marsa	0–1	Espérance de Tunis	La Marsa
14:30		Report	Rejaibi 25'	Stadium: Stade Abdelaziz Chtioui

12 October 2017 Friendly	Espérance de Tunis	7–0	AS Soukra	Tunis
14:00	Ben Sghaïer 22'; Mejri 42'; Eneramo 48', 65', 78'; Ben Youssef 73'; Bguir 79' (pen.)	Report		Stadium: Parc Hassen Belkhodja

29 October 2017 Friendly	Espérance de Tunis	3–1	CS Hammam-Lif	Tunis
14:00	Eneramo 29', 48'; Dhaouadi 74'	Report	Belhadj 36'	Stadium: Parc Hassen Belkhodja

2 November 2017 Friendly	Espérance de Tunis	5–0	AS Soukra	Tunis
11:00	Jouini 23', 45'; Eneramo 26', 30'; Mejri 53'	Report		Stadium: Parc Hassen Belkhodja

9 November 2017 Friendly	Espérance de Tunis	3–1	AS Ariana	Tunis
14:00	Jouini 4'; Ben Sghaïer 6'; Coulibaly 31'	Report	Touzri 8'	Stadium: Stade El Menzah

21 April 2017 Friendly	Espérance de Tunis	0–2	Tunisia U23	Tunis
16:00		Report	Chtioui 13'; Raddaoui 20'	Stadium: Stade El Menzah

== Competitions ==
=== Overview ===
Competition	Record								Started round	Final position / round	First match	Last match
Competition	G	W	D	L	GF	GA	GD	Win %	Started round	Final position / round	First match	Last match
Ligue 1	26	17	7	2	45	19	+26	65.38	—N/a	Winners	15 August 2017	10 May 2018
Tunisian Cup	1	0	0	1	0	1	−1	0.00	Round of 32		4 February 2018	
2017 Champions League	2	0	1	1	3	4	−1	0.00	Quarter-finals		16 September 2017	23 September 2017
2018 Champions League	6	3	3	0	11	2	+9	50.00	Preliminary round	Winners	10 February 2018	9 November 2018
Club Champions Cup	5	5	0	0	11	5	+6	100.00	Group stage	Winners	24 July 2017	6 August 2017
Total	40	25	11	4	70	31	+39	62.50				

Updated to match played 3 June 2019
Source: Competitions

== League table ==
Pos	Team	Pld	W	D	L	GF	GA	GD	Pts	Qualification or relegation
1	Espérance de Tunis (C)	26	17	7	2	45	19	+26	58	Qualification for Champions League
2	Club Africain	26	14	5	7	36	21	+15	47 (Note: Head-to-head: Club Africain are ahead on head-to-head record: Club Africain 1–0 Étoile du Sahel (week 8), Étoile du Sahel 0–1 Club Africain (week 21))	Qualification for Champions League
3	Étoile du Sahel	26	14	5	7	38	17	+21	47	Qualification for Confederation Cup
4	Club Sfaxien	26	13	7	6	37	18	+19	46	Qualification for Confederation Cup
5	Club Bizertin	26	14	1	11	40	32	+8	37 (Note: Club Bizertin were deducted 6 points by FIFA for not paying a former player.)	

Source: Ligue 1
Rules for classification: 1) points; 2) head-to-head points; 3) head-to-head goal difference; 4) goal difference; 5) total goals; 6) fairplay ranking; 7) playoff.
(C) Champions

=== Results summary ===
Overall								Home						Away					
Pld	W	D	L	GF	GA	GD	Pts	W	D	L	GF	GA	GD	W	D	L	GF	GA	GD
26	17	7	2	46	19	+27	58	11	2	0	25	7	+18	6	5	2	21	12	+9

Last updated: 22 April 2018.
Source: Competitive matches

=== Results by round ===
Round	1	2	3	4	5	6	7	8	9	10	11	12	13	14	15	16	17	18	19	20	21	22	23	24	25	26
Ground	A	H	A	H	A	H	H	A	H	A	H	H	A	H	A	H	A	H	A	A	H	A	H	A	A	H
Result	W	W	W	W	D	W	W	D	D	W	W	W	W	W	D	W	D	W	L	W	W	W	W	D	L	D
Position	2	2	1	1	1	1	1	1	1	1	1	1	1	1	1	1	1	1	1	1	1	1	1	1	1	1

Source: Competitive matches
A = Away; H = Home; W = Win; D = Draw; L = Loss

=== Matches ===
Win Draw Loss

15 August 2017 Round 1	CO Médenine	0–2	Espérance de Tunis	Médenine
16:30		Soccerway report	Sassi 4'; Badri 45'	Stadium: Stade Salaheddine Ben Hmida; Referee: Haythem Kossaï

20 August 2017 Round 2	Espérance de Tunis	2–0	US Ben Guerdane	Rades
19:00	Khenissi 32'; Ben Youssef 37'	Soccerway report		Stadium: Stade Olympique de Radès; Referee: Amir Loussif

25 August 2017 Round 3	CA Bizertin	2–3	Espérance de Tunis	Bizerte
16:00	Ounalli 9'; Saidani 70'	Soccerway report	Khenissi 27' (pen.), 66'; Badri 48'	Stadium: Stade 15 Octobre; Referee: Yosri Bouali

9 September 2017 Round 4	Espérance de Tunis	1–0	AS Gabès	Rades
21:00	Khenissi 65' (pen.)	Soccerway report		Stadium: Stade Olympique de Radès; Referee: Ameur Chouchene

26 November 2017 Round 5	Étoile du Sahel	0–0	Espérance de Tunis	Sousse
18:10		Soccerway report		Stadium: Stade Olympique de Sousse; Referee: Amir Ayadi

3 December 2017 Round 6	Espérance de Tunis	1–0	Club Africain	Rades
14:00	Sassi 41' (pen.)	Soccerway report		Stadium: Stade Olympique de Radès; Referee: Mohamed Chaaben

21 October 2017 Round 7	Espérance de Tunis	2–1	US Monastir	Tunis
14:00	Coulibaly 5'; Eneramo 56' (pen.)	Soccerway report	Anane 81'	Stadium: Stade El Menzah; Referee: Jalel Sahbani

16 December 2017 Round 8	Stade Tunisien	2–2	Espérance de Tunis	Le Bardo
13:00	Bessan 34', 36'	Soccerway report	Chammam 42'; Sassi 82' (pen.)	Stadium: Stade Hédi Enneifer; Referee: Naïm Hosni

23 December 2017 Round 9	Espérance de Tunis	1–1	CS Sfaxien	Rades
14:00	Ben Youssef 42'	Soccerway report	Aouadhi 84'	Stadium: Stade Olympique de Radès; Referee: Haythem Guirat

16 November 2017 Round 10	ES Métlaoui	0–3	Espérance de Tunis	Métlaoui
13:00		Soccerway report	Khenissi 18' (pen.); Ben Youssef 45'; Ben Sghaïer 90'	Stadium: Stade municipal de Métlaoui; Referee: Maher Harrabi

21 November 2017 Round 11	Espérance de Tunis	3–0	Stade Gabèsien	Tunis
13:00	Khenissi 2'; Machani 50'; Badri 86'	Soccerway report		Stadium: Stade El Menzah; Referee: Rochdi Guezguez

29 November 2017 Round 12	Espérance de Tunis	2–0	ES Zarzis	Tunis
13:00	Ben Youssef 21'; Sassi 61' (pen.)	Soccerway report		Stadium: Stade El Menzah; Referee: Amir Loussif

7 December 2017 Round 13	JS Kairouan	1–2	Espérance de Tunis	Kairouan
13:00	Mendouga 40'	Soccerway report	Chaalali 70'; Badri 86'	Stadium: Stade Hamda Laouani; Referee: Oussama Razgallah

27 December 2017 Round 14	Espérance de Tunis	3–1	CO Médenine	Rades
13:00	Ben Sghaïer 23', 46'; Bguir 51'	Soccerway report		Stadium: Stade Olympique de Radès; Referee: Jalel Sahbani

21 January 2018 Round 15	US Ben Guerdane	2–2	Espérance de Tunis	Ben Guerdane
12:00	Jaziri 40' (pen.), 59'	Soccerway report	Talbi 11'; Jouini 24'	Stadium: Stade du 7 Mars; Referee: Mohamed Chaabane

27 January 2018 Round 16	Espérance de Tunis	1–0	CA Bizertin	Rades
12:45	Jouini 34'	Soccerway report		Stadium: Stade Olympique de Radès; Referee: Mehrez Melki

31 January 2018 Round 17	AS Gabès	1–1	Espérance de Tunis	Gabès
12:00	Ali Guechi 80' (pen.)	Soccerway report	Jouini 55'	Stadium: Stade Municipal de Gabès; Referee: Amir Loussif

15 February 2018 Round 18	Espérance de Tunis	3–2	Étoile du Sahel	Rades
16:00	Belaïli 17'; Khenissi 85' (pen.); Jouini 90+11'	Soccerway report	Talbi 36' (o.g.); Bangoura 44'	Stadium: Stade Olympique de Radès; Referee: Karim Khemiri

18 February 2018 Round 19	Club Africain	2–1	Espérance de Tunis	Rades
13:00	Ben Yahia 45+2'; Belaïd 67'	Soccerway report	Ben-Hatira 7'	Stadium: Stade Olympique de Radès; Referee: Haythem Guirat

2 March 2018 Round 20	US Monastir	0–2	Espérance de Tunis	Monastir
14:00		Soccerway report	Khenissi 42'	Stadium: Stade Mustapha Ben Jannet; Referee: Oussama Razgallah

11 March 2018 Round 21	Espérance de Tunis	3–0	Stade Tunisien	Rades
18:10	Kom 31', 41'; Jouini 68'	Soccerway report		Stadium: Stade Olympique de Radès; Referee: Yosri Bouali

31 March 2018 Round 22	CS Sfaxien	0–2	Espérance de Tunis	Sfax
14:30		Soccerway report	Khenissi 24'; Bguir 26'	Stadium: Stade Taïeb Mhiri; Referee: Haythem Kossaï

8 April 2018 Round 23	Espérance de Tunis	1–0	ES Métlaoui	Rades
19:10	Belaïli 31'	Soccerway report		Stadium: Stade Olympique de Radès; Referee: Yosri Bouali

15 April 2018 Round 24	Stade Gabèsien	1–1	Espérance de Tunis	Gabès
15:00	Mahmoud 49'	Soccerway report	Mahmoud 64' (o.g.)	Stadium: Stade Municipal de Gabès; Referee: Sadok Selmi

27 April 2018 Round 25	ES Zarzis	1–0	Espérance de Tunis	Zarzis
15:30	Bouhajeb 89'	Soccerway report		Stadium: Stade Jlidi; Referee: Haythem Guirat

10 May 2018 Round 26	Espérance de Tunis	2–2	JS Kairouan	Rades
17:15	Rejaibi 38'; Belaïli 68' (pen.)	Soccerway report	Sassi 42' (pen.); Mendoga 47'	Stadium: Stade Olympique de Radès; Referee: Rochdi Guezguez

== Tunisian Cup ==
4 February 2018 Round of 32	ES Métlaoui	1–0 (a.e.t.)	Espérance de Tunis	Métlaoui
12:30	Idrissa Niang 118'	Report		Stadium: Stade municipal de Métlaoui; Referee: Nasrallah Jaouadi

== 2017 Champions League ==
=== Knockout stage ===
==== Quarter-finals ====
16 September 2017	Al-Ahly (Egypt)	2–2	(Tunisia) Espérance de Tunis	Alexandria
19:00 UTC+2	Said 11' (pen.); Azaro 67'	Report	Khenissi 21'; Chaalali 48'	Stadium: Borg El Arab Stadium; Referee: Malang Diedhiou (Senegal)

23 September 2017	Espérance de Tunis (Tunisia)	1–2	(Egypt) Al-Ahly	Radès
19:00 UTC+1	Khenissi 40' (pen.)	Report	Maâloul 50'; Ajayi 62'	Stadium: Stade Olympique de Radès; Referee: Sidi Alioum (Cameroon)

== 2018 Champions League ==
=== Preliminary round ===
10 February 2018	ASAC Concorde (Mauritania)	1–1	(Tunisia) Espérance de Tunis	Nouakchott
16:00 UTC+0	El Id 25'	Report	Jouini 67'	Stadium: Stade Cheikha Ould Boïdiya; Referee: Baba Leno (Guinea)

21 February 2018	Espérance de Tunis (Tunisia)	5–0	(Mauritania) ASAC Concorde	Radès
17:00 UTC+1	Badri 6', 55' (pen.); Ben Sghaïer 73' (pen.); Erbeia 81'; Coulibaly 84'	Report		Stadium: Stade Olympique de Radès; Referee: Nabil Boukhalfa (Algeria)

=== First round ===
7 March 2018	Gor Mahia (Kenya)	0–0	(Tunisia) Espérance de Tunis	Machakos
15:00 UTC+3		Report		Stadium: Kenyatta Stadium; Referee: Gehad Grisha (Egypt)

18 March 2018	Espérance de Tunis (Tunisia)	1–0	(Kenya) Gor Mahia	Radès
16:00 UTC+1	Badri 21'	Report		Stadium: Stade Olympique de Radès; Referee: Joshua Bondo (Botswana)

=== Group stage ===
==== Group A ====
Pos	Team	Pld	W	D	L	GF	GA	GD	Pts	Qualification	AHL	EST	KCC	ROL
1	(Egypt) Al Ahly	6	4	1	1	9	5	+4	13	Quarter-finals	—	0–0	4–3	3–0
2	(Tunisia) Espérance de Tunis	6	3	2	1	8	4	+4	11	Quarter-finals	0–1	—	3–2	4–1
3	(Uganda) KCCA	6	2	0	4	8	9	−1	6		2–0	0–1	—	1–0
4	(Botswana) Township Rollers	6	1	1	4	2	9	−7	4		0–1	0–0	1–0	—

Source: CAF
Rules for classification: Group stage tiebreakers

4 May 2018 1	Al-Ahly (Egypt)	0–0	(Tunisia) Espérance de Tunis	Alexandria
21:00 UTC+2		Report		Stadium: Borg El Arab Stadium; Referee: Malang Diedhiou (Senegal)

15 May 2018 2	Espérance de Tunis (Tunisia)	4–1	(Botswana) Township Rollers	Radès
20:00 UTC+1	Belaïli 25'; Badri 46', 90+1'; Mejri 78'	Report	Boy 41'	Stadium: Stade Olympique de Radès; Referee: Bamlak Tessema Weyesa (Ethiopia)

== Club Championship Cup ==
=== Group stage ===
==== Group C ====
Pos	Team	Pld	W	D	L	GF	GA	GD	Pts	Qualification
1	(Tunisia) Espérance de Tunis	3	3	0	0	6	2	+4	9	Advance to knockout stage
2	(Sudan) Al-Merrikh	3	1	1	1	3	4	−1	4	
3	(Saudi Arabia) Al-Hilal	3	0	2	1	5	6	−1	2	
4	(Iraq) Naft Al-Wasat	3	0	1	2	3	5	−2	1	

Source: Soccerway

24 July 2017	Naft Al-Wasat (Iraq)	0–1	(Tunisia) Espérance de Tunis	Alexandria
18:00		Report	83' Khenissi	Stadium: Borg El Arab Stadium; Referee: Ali Lemghaifry (Mauritania)

27 July 2017	Espérance de Tunis (Tunisia)	2–0	(Sudan) Al-Merrikh	Alexandria
21:00	Badri 21', 70'	Report		Stadium: Borg El Arab Stadium; Referee: Ibrahim Nour El Din (Egypt)

30 July 2017	Espérance de Tunis (Tunisia)	3–2	(Saudi Arabia) Al-Hilal	Alexandria
18:00	Matri 45'; Jouini 58'; Chaaleli 74'	Report	49' Al-Yami; 60' Al-Rashidi	Stadium: Borg El Arab Stadium; Referee: Adham Makhadmeh (Jordan)

=== Semi-finals ===
3 August 2017	Fath Union Sport (Morocco)	1–2 (a.e.t.)	(Tunisia) Espérance de Tunis	Alexandria
20:00	Semmoumy 28'	Report	47' Chemmam; 95' (pen.) Khenissi	Stadium: Alexandria Stadium; Referee: Turki Al-Khudhayr (Saudi Arabia)

=== Final ===
6 August 2017	Al-Faisaly (Jordan)	2–3 (a.e.t.)	(Tunisia) Espérance de Tunis	Alexandria
20:00	Zuway 72'; Attiah 88'	Report	46', 54' Bguir; 101' Dhaouadi	Stadium: Alexandria Stadium; Attendance: 7,500; Referee: Ibrahim Nour El Din (Egypt)

== Squad information ==
=== Playing statistics ===
No.	Pos	Nat	Player	Total		Ligue 1		Tunisian Cup		Champions League		Championship Cup	
No.	Pos	Nat	Player	Apps	Goals	Apps	Goals	Apps	Goals	Apps	Goals	Apps	Goals
Goalkeepers
1	GK	(Tunisia) TUN	Moez Ben Cherifia	26	0	13	0	1	0	8	0	4	0
23	GK	(Tunisia) TUN	Ali Jemal	15	0	13	0	0	0	1	0	1	0
Defenders
2	DF	(Tunisia) TUN	Malek Charfi	2	0	2	0	0	0	0	0	0	0
2	DF	(Tunisia) TUN	Ali Machani	19	1	12	1	1	0	2	0	4	0
3	DF	(Tunisia) TUN	Ferid Matri	2	1	1	0	0	0	0	0	1	1
4	DF	(Tunisia) TUN	Montassar Talbi	19	1	14	1	0	0	2	0	3	0
5	DF	(Tunisia) TUN	Chamseddine Dhaouadi	32	1	19	0	1	0	8	0	4	1
12	DF	(Tunisia) TUN	Khalil Chemmam	36	2	23	1	1	0	8	0	4	1
22	DF	(Tunisia) TUN	Sameh Derbali	18	0	11	0	1	0	6	0	0	0
24	DF	(Tunisia) TUN	Iheb Mbarki	16	0	11	0	0	0	2	0	3	0
Midfielders
3	MF	(Benin) BEN	Chamseddine Chaona	2	0	2	0	0	0	0	0	0	0
7	MF	(Tunisia) TUN	Adam Rejaibi	4	1	3	1	0	0	0	0	1	0
10	MF	(Tunisia) TUN	Änis Ben-Hatira	9	1	8	1	0	0	1	0	0	0
15	MF	(Ivory Coast) CIV	Fousseny Coulibaly	37	2	24	1	1	0	8	1	4	0
17	MF	(Tunisia) TUN	Maher Ben Sghaïer	24	4	16	3	0	0	4	1	4	0
18	MF	(Tunisia) TUN	Saad Bguir	31	4	18	2	1	0	7	0	5	2
20	MF	(Tunisia) TUN	Aymen Ben Mohamed	2	0	2	0	0	0	0	0	0	0
21	MF	(Tunisia) TUN	Mohamed Ali Moncer	5	0	0	0	1	0	4	0	0	0
25	MF	(Tunisia) TUN	Ghailene Chaalali	27	3	17	1	1	0	4	1	5	1
26	MF	(Tunisia) TUN	Houcine Rabii	16	1	9	0	0	0	6	1	1	0
28	MF	(Tunisia) TUN	Mohamed Amine Meskini	5	0	5	0	0	0	0	0	0	0
30	MF	(Cameroon) CMR	Franck Kom	36	2	23	2	1	0	8	0	4	0
	MF	(Tunisia) TUN	Mohamed Ali Ben Romdhane	2	0	2	0	0	0	0	0	0	0
Forwards
8	FW	(Tunisia) TUN	Anice Badri	35	11	22	4	1	0	8	5	4	2
9	FW	(Tunisia) TUN	Bilel Mejri	14	1	10	0	0	0	3	1	1	0
11	FW	(Algeria) ALG	Youcef Belaïli	14	4	9	3	1	0	4	1	0	0
14	FW	(Tunisia) TUN	Haythem Jouini	25	7	14	5	1	0	6	1	4	1
29	FW	(Tunisia) TUN	Taha Yassine Khenissi	26	13	17	9	0	0	6	2	3	2
Players transferred out during the season
	MF	(Tunisia) TUN	Ferjani Sassi	22	4	15	4	0	0	2	0	5	0
	FW	(Nigeria) NGR	Michael Eneramo	5	1	5	1	0	0	0	0	0	0
	FW	(Tunisia) TUN	Fakhreddine Ben Youssef	18	4	12	4	0	0	2	0	4	0

Last updated: 8 June 2019
Source: fr.soccerway.com

=== Goalscorers ===
Includes all competitive matches. The list is sorted alphabetically by surname when total goals are equal.

== Transfers ==
=== In ===
Date	Pos	Player	From club	Transfer fee	Source
1 July 2017	MF	(Tunisia) Maher Ben Sghaïer	CA Bizerte	Free transfer	
1 July 2017	FW	(Tunisia) Haythem Jouini	(Spain) CD Tenerife	Loan Return	
6 July 2017	MF	(Cameroon) Franck Kom	(Germany) Karlsruher SC	Free transfer	
22 July 2017	MF	(Tunisia) Mohamed Amine Meskini	CS Hammam-Lif	Free transfer	
15 September 2017	MF	(Tunisia) Änis Ben-Hatira	(Turkey) Gaziantepspor	Free transfer	
15 September 2017	FW	(Nigeria) Michael Eneramo	(Saudi Arabia) Ettifaq FC	Free transfer	
22 December 2017	DF	(Tunisia) Sameh Derbali	(Libya) Al Ahli SC	Free transfer	
26 January 2018	MF	(Algeria) Youcef Belaïli	(France) Angers SCO	Free transfer	
31 January 2018	MF	(Tunisia) Mohamed Ali Moncer	(Egypt) Al Ittihad Alexandria	Loan Return	

=== Out ===
Date	Pos	Player	To club	Transfer fee	Source
1 July 2017	?	(Tunisia) Hamza Ben Abda	CA Bizerte	Free transfer	
23 July 2017	DF	(Algeria) Hichem Belkaroui	(Portugal) Moreirense	Free transfer	
24 July 2017	FW	(Libya) Mohamed Zubya	(Libya) Al-Ittihad	Free transfer	
15 September 2017	MF	(Tunisia) Elyès Jlassi	Stade tunisien	Free transfer	
29 January 2018	MF	(Tunisia) Ferjani Sassi	(Saudi Arabia) Al-Nassr FC	Free transfer	
31 January 2018	FW	(Tunisia) Fakhreddine Ben Youssef	(Saudi Arabia) Ettifaq FC	Free transfer	
31 January 2018	FW	(Nigeria) Michael Eneramo	(Northern Cyprus) Türk Ocağı Limasol SK	Free transfer	
28 February 2018	DF	(Tunisia) Ferid Matri	(Switzerland) Étoile Carouge FC	Free transfer	
