= 2016–17 Espérance Sportive de Tunis season =

Espérance Sportive de Tunis
2016–17 season
- President: Hamdi Meddeb
- Head coach: Ammar Souayah (until 2 January 2017); Faouzi Benzarti (from 3 January 2017)
- Stadium: Stade de Radès
- Ligue 1: Winners
- 2016 Tunisian Cup: Winners
- 2017 Tunisian Cup: Semi-finals
- Champions League: Group stage
- Top goalscorer: League: Khenissi (14 goals); All: Khenissi (24 goals)

In the 2016–17 season, Espérance Sportive de Tunis competed in the Ligue 1 for the 62nd season, as well as the Tunisian Cup. It was their 62nd consecutive season in the top flight of Tunisian football. They competed in Ligue 1, the Champions League and the Tunisian Cup.

== Squad list ==
Players and squad numbers last updated on 18 November 2016.
Note: Flags indicate national team as has been defined under FIFA eligibility rules. Players may hold more than one non-FIFA nationality.

No.	Nat.	Position	Name	Date of birth (age)	Signed from
Goalkeepers
1	(Tunisia)	GK	Moez Ben Cherifia	24 June 1991 (aged 26)	(Tunisia) Youth system
23	(Tunisia)	GK	Ali Jemal	9 June 1990 (aged 27)	(Tunisia) US Ben Guerdane
Defenders
2	(Tunisia)	CB	Ali Machani	12 July 1993 (aged 24)	(Tunisia) CA Bizerte
3	(Tunisia)	CB	Ferid Matri	16 January 1994 (aged 23)	(Switzerland) FC Le Mont
4	(Tunisia)	CB	Montassar Talbi	26 May 1998 (aged 19)	(Tunisia) Youth system
5	(Tunisia)	CB	Chamseddine Dhaouadi	15 January 1987 (aged 30)	(Tunisia) Étoile Sportive du Sahel
12	(Tunisia)	CB	Khalil Chemmam	24 July 1987 (aged 30)	(Portugal) Vitória de Guimarães
24	(Tunisia)	RB	Iheb Mbarki	14 February 1992 (aged 25)	(France) Thonon Évian
26	(Tunisia)	LB	Houcine Rabii	8 November 1991 (aged 25)	(Tunisia) ES Zarzis
Midfielders
7	(Tunisia)		Adam Rejaibi	5 April 1994 (aged 23)	(Tunisia) CA Bizerte
15	(Ivory Coast)		Fousseny Coulibaly	10 August 1989 (aged 28)	(Tunisia) Stade Tunisien
18	(Tunisia)		Saad Bguir	22 March 1994 (aged 23)	(Tunisia) Stade Gabèsien
20	(Tunisia)		Ayman Ben Mohamed	8 December 1994 (aged 22)	(Republic of Ireland) Bohemian
21	(Tunisia)		Mohamed Ali Moncer	28 April 1991 (aged 26)	(Tunisia) CS Sfaxien
25	(Tunisia)		Ghailene Chaalali	28 February 1994 (aged 23)	(Tunisia) Youth system
13	(Tunisia)		Ferjani Sassi	18 March 1992 (aged 25)	(France) FC Metz
Forwards
8	(Tunisia)		Anice Badri	18 September 1990 (aged 26)	(Belgium) Royal Excel Mouscron
9	(Tunisia)		Bilel Mejri	6 February 1996 (aged 21)	(Tunisia) Youth system
29	(Tunisia)		Taha Yassine Khenissi	6 January 1992 (aged 25)	(Tunisia) CS Sfaxien
11	(Tunisia)		Fakhreddine Ben Youssef	23 June 1991 (aged 26)	(Tunisia) CS Sfaxien

== Pre-season ==
17 July 2016 Friendly	CS Tabarka	0–3	Espérance de Tunis	Tabarka
17:30		Report	11' Dhaouadi; 47' Mejri; 61' Chaalali	Stadium: Stade municipal de Tabarka

23 July 2016 Friendly	Espérance de Tunis (Tunisia)	1–1	(Saudi Arabia) Hajer FC	Mutuelleville
17:00	Mejri 6'	Report	70' Al-Arfej	Stadium: Stade Chedly Zouiten

29 July 2016 Friendly	Espérance de Tunis (Tunisia)	3–2	(Algeria) DRB Tadjenanet	Tabarka
17:00	Chaalali 12'; Dhaouadi 48'; Mejri 94'	Report	41' Aib; 110' Bouledia	Stadium: Stade municipal de Tabarka

2 August 2016 Friendly	Espérance de Tunis	3–0	Stade Gabèsien	Tabarka
17:00	Jouini; Chaalali; Bulbwa	Report		Stadium: Stade municipal de Tabarka

7 August 2016 Friendly	Espérance de Tunis	2–0	US Tataouine	Tunis
17:30	Bulbwa 39'; Machani 45' (pen.)	Report		Stadium: Parc Hassen Belkhodja

9 August 2016 Friendly	Espérance de Tunis (Tunisia)	2–0	(Algeria) ES Sétif	Mutuelleville
17:30	Khenissi 14' (pen.), 42'	Report		Stadium: Stade Chedly Zouiten

3 September 2016 Friendly	Espérance de Tunis	2–0	Grombalia Sports	Tunis
17:00	Mbarki 40'; Bulbwa 55'	Report		Stadium: Parc Hassen Belkhodja

19 September 2016 Friendly	Espérance de Tunis	1–0	AS Oued Ellil	Tunis
11:00	Moncer 42'	Report		Stadium: Parc Hassen Belkhodja

1 October 2016 Friendly	Espérance de Tunis	2–1	ES Fahs	Tunis
15:30	Zubya 11'; Moncer 48'	Report	72' Ben Boubaker	Stadium: Parc Hassen Belkhodja

5 October 2016 Friendly	Espérance de Tunis	3–0	CS Makthar	Tunis
15:00	Machani 17'; Ben Mohamed 26'; Moncer 82'	Report		Stadium: Parc Hassen Belkhodja

9 October 2016 Friendly	Espérance de Tunis	3–1	JS Kairouan	Tunis
15:00	Moncer 79', 88'; Rabii 90+2'	Report	48' (pen.) Zaidi	Stadium: Stade El Menzah

5 November 2016 Friendly	CS Hammam-Lif	0–1	Espérance de Tunis	Hammam-Lif
15:00		Report	4' Machani	Stadium: Stade Bou Kornine

== Mid-season ==
17 January 2017 Friendly	Difaâ Hassani El Jadidi (Morocco)	1–1	(Tunisia) Espérance de Tunis	El Jadida
20:00	Mbarki 72' (o.g.)	Report	8' Talbi	Stadium: Stade Ben Ahmed El-Abdi

20 January 2017 Friendly	Kawkab Marrakech (Morocco)	1–1	(Tunisia) Espérance de Tunis	Marrakesh
16:30	Elhaki 13'	Report	42' Badri

23 January 2017 Friendly	RS Berkane (Morocco)	2–1	(Tunisia) Espérance de Tunis	Berkane
16:30	? 60', 69'	Report	61' Coulibaly

29 January 2017 Friendly	CS Hammam-Lif	1–2	Espérance de Tunis	Hammam-Lif
12:00	Laadhibi 69'	Report	5' Rejaibi; 61' Bguir	Stadium: Stade Bou Kornine

== Competitions ==
=== Overview ===
Competition	Record								Started round	Final position / round	First match	Last match
Competition	G	W	D	L	GF	GA	GD	Win %	Started round	Final position / round	First match	Last match
Ligue 1	24	16	7	1	37	8	+29	66.67	—N/a	Winners	10 September 2016	18 May 2017
2016 Tunisian Cup	3	3	0	0	5	1	+4	100.00	Quarter-finals	Winners	16 August 2016	27 August 2016
2017 Tunisian Cup	4	3	1	0	9	2	+7	75.00	Round of 32	Semi-finals	30 November 2016	28 May 2017
2017 Champions League	7	3	3	1	11	7	+4	42.86	First round	Quarter-finals	11 March 2017	23 September 2017
Total	38	25	11	2	62	18	+44	65.79				

Source: Competitions

=== Ligue 1 ===
==== First round ====
Group A

===== League table =====
Pos	Team	Pld	W	D	L	GF	GA	GD	Pts	Qualification or relegation
1	Espérance de Tunis	14	8	5	1	19	6	+13	29	Qualification to the championship group
2	Club Africain	14	8	3	3	21	10	+11	27	Qualification to the championship group
3	Étoile de Métlaoui	14	6	4	4	15	16	−1	22	Qualification to the championship group
4	Stade Gabèsien	14	4	6	4	14	14	0	18	Qualification to the relegation group
5	Avenir de Gabès	14	3	8	3	21	18	+3	17	Qualification to the relegation group

Source: Ligue 1
Rules for classification: 1) points; 2) goal difference; 3) number of goals scored.

===== Results by round =====
Round	1	2	3	4	5	6	7	8	9	10	11	12	13	14
Ground	H	A	A	H	A	H	A	A	H	H	A	H	A	H
Result	W	W	W	D	D	D	W	W	W	D	D	W	L	W
Position	3	2	2	2	2	2	2	2	1	1	1	1	2	1

Source: Competitive matches
A = Away; H = Home; W = Win; D = Draw; L = Loss

===== Matches =====
Win Draw Loss

10 September 2016 Round 1	Espérance de Tunis	2–1	Stade Gabèsien	Rades
15:30	Khenissi 56' (pen.); Sassi 76' (pen.)	Soccerway report	72' Hosni	Stadium: Stade Olympique de Radès; Referee: Wassim Ben Salah

18 September 2016 Round 2	Olympique Béja	0–2	Espérance de Tunis	Béja
15:30		Soccerway report	45' Rejaibi; 50' Khenissi	Stadium: Stade Boujemaa Kmiti; Referee: Yosri Bouali

24 September 2016 Round 3	AS Marsa	0–2	Espérance de Tunis	La Marsa
15:30		Soccerway report	38' (pen.) Khenissi; 63' Ali Moncer	Stadium: Stade Abdelaziz Chtioui; Referee: Rochdi Guezguez

16 October 2016 Round 4	Espérance de Tunis	0–0	CS Hammam-Lif	Rades
17:00		Soccerway report		Stadium: Stade Olympique de Radès; Referee: Amir Ayadi

22 October 2016 Round 5	AS Gabès	1–1	Espérance de Tunis	Gabès
14:30	Omrani 45'	Soccerway report	52' Khenissi	Stadium: Stade Municipal de Gabès; Referee: Haythe Guirat

30 October 2016 Round 6	Espérance de Tunis	1–1	Club Africain	Rades
17:00	Badri 3'	Soccerway report	20' Chenihi	Stadium: Stade Olympique de Radès; Referee: Walid Jeridi

20 November 2016 Round 7	ES Métlaoui	0–1	Espérance de Tunis	Métlaoui
14:30		Soccerway report	57' Bguir	Stadium: Stade municipal de Métlaoui; Referee: Sadok Selmi

27 November 2016 Round 8	Stade Gabèsien	0–2	Espérance de Tunis	Gabès
14:00		Soccerway report	9' Khenissi; 40' Bguir	Stadium: Stade Municipal de Gabès; Referee: Yousri Bou Ali

4 December 2016 Round 9	Espérance de Tunis	2–1	Olympique Béja	Rades
14:00	Khenissi 22', 69'	Soccerway report	77' Omrani	Stadium: Stade Olympique de Radès; Referee: Rochdi Guezguez

10 December 2016 Round 10	Espérance de Tunis	0–0	AS Marsa	Rades
14:00		Soccerway report		Stadium: Stade Olympique de Radès; Referee: Nidhal Letaïef

18 December 2016 Round 11	CS Hammam-Lif	1–1	Espérance de Tunis	Gabès
14:00	Zoghlami 87'	Soccerway report	68' Khenissi	Stadium: Stade Municipal de Gabès; Referee: Naim Hosni

23 December 2016 Round 12	Espérance de Tunis	2–0	AS Gabès	Rades
14:00	Bguir 50'; Khenissi 88'	Soccerway report		Stadium: Stade Olympique de Radès; Referee: Amir Loussif

9 February 2017 Round 13	Club Africain	1–0	Espérance de Tunis	Rades
15:00	Khalifa 90'	Soccerway report		Stadium: Stade Olympique de Radès; Referee: Nidhal Letaïef

15 February 2017 Round 14	Espérance de Tunis	3–0	ES Métlaoui	Rades
16:00	Ben Youssef 22'; Badri 85'; Sassi 88'	Soccerway report		Stadium: Stade Olympique de Radès; Referee: Khaled Gouider

==== Championship round ====
===== Table =====
Pos	Team	Pld	W	D	L	GF	GA	GD	Pts	Qualification
1	Espérance de Tunis (C)	10	8	2	0	18	2	+16	26	2018 CAF Champions League
2	Étoile du Sahel	10	7	1	2	16	9	+7	22	2018 CAF Champions League
3	Club Africain	10	5	1	4	17	11	+6	16	2018 CAF Confederation Cup
4	Club Sfaxien	10	3	3	4	11	10	+1	12	
5	Étoile de Métlaoui	10	3	0	7	8	18	−10	9	

Source: Ligue 1
Rules for classification: 1) points; 2) goal difference; 3) number of goals scored.
(C) Champions

===== Position by round =====
Round	1	2	3	4	5	6	7	8	9	10
Ground	A	H	H	A	A	H	A	A	H	H
Result	W	W	W	D	D	W	W	W	W	W
Position	1	1	1	1	1	1	1	1	1	1

Updated to match(es) played on 13 July 2020. Source: Liga I
A = Away; H = Home; W = Win; D = Draw; L = Loss

===== Matches =====
Win Draw Loss

26 February 2017 Round 1	ES Métlaoui	0–2	Espérance de Tunis	Métlaoui
14:00		Soccerway report	61' Ben Youssef; 81' Sassi	Stadium: Stade municipal de Métlaoui; Referee: Mehrez Melki

1 March 2017 Round 2	Espérance de Tunis	2–1	Club Africain	Rades
16:30	Bguir 22'; Badri 66'	Soccerway report	71' Chenihi	Stadium: Stade Olympique de Radès; Referee: Yosri Bouali

5 March 2017 Round 3	Espérance de Tunis	2–0	US Ben Guerdane	Rades
15:15	Ben Youssef 17'; Khenissi 48'	Soccerway report		Stadium: Stade Olympique de Radès; Referee: Haythem Kossaï

2 April 2017 Round 4	CS Sfaxien	0–0	Espérance de Tunis	Sfax
16:30		Soccerway report		Stadium: Stade Taïeb Mhiri; Referee: Amir Loussif

9 April 2017 Round 5	Étoile du Sahel	1–1	Espérance de Tunis	Sousse
17:00	Diogo Acosta 68'	Soccerway report	59' Khenissi	Stadium: Stade Olympique de Sousse; Referee: Walid Jridi

23 April 2017 Round 6	Espérance de Tunis	3–0	ES Métlaoui	Rades
15:45	Badri 27'; Chemmam 71'; Ben Youssef 77'	Soccerway report		Stadium: Stade Olympique de Radès; Referee: Haythem Kossaï

30 April 2017 Round 7	Club Africain	0–2	Espérance de Tunis	Rades
15:45		Soccerway report	8' Khenissi; 40' Ben Youssef	Stadium: Stade Olympique de Radès; Referee: Khaled Khemiri

3 May 2017 Round 8	US Ben Guerdane	0–2	Espérance de Tunis	Ben Guerdane
16:00		Soccerway report	22' (pen.) Khenissi; 51' Badri	Stadium: Stade du 7 Mars; Referee: Wassim Ben Salah

7 May 2017 Round 9	Espérance de Tunis	1–0	CS Sfaxien	Rades
16:00	Dhaouadi 77'	Soccerway report		Stadium: Stade Olympique de Radès; Referee: Sadok Selmi

18 May 2017 Round 10	Espérance de Tunis	3–0	Étoile du Sahel	Rades
16:00	Chaalali 13'; Machani 30'; Khenissi 49'	Soccerway report		Stadium: Stade Olympique de Radès; Referee: Youssef Sraïri

== 2016 Tunisian Cup ==
16 August 2016 Quarter-finals	Étoile du Sahel	0–1	Espérance de Tunis	Sousse
17:00		Report	63' Khenissi	Stadium: Stade Olympique de Sousse; Referee: Youssef Sraïri

20 August 2016 Semi-finals	Stade Gabèsien	1–2	Espérance de Tunis	Gabès
15:45	Essifi 19' (pen.)	Report	57', 69' (pen.) Khenissi	Stadium: Stade Municipal de Gabès; Referee: Sadok Selmi

27 August 2016 Final	Club Africain	0–2	Espérance de Tunis	Radès
17:00		Report	50' Khenissi; 54' Rjaïbi	Stadium: Stade Olympique de Radès; Referee: Haythem Guirat

== 2017 Tunisian Cup ==
30 November 2016 Round of 32	Badr el Ain	0–4	Espérance de Tunis	El Ain
13:30		Report	5', 25' Mejri; 58' Rjaïbi; 80' Jelassi	Stadium: Stade municipal d'El Aïn; Referee: Jalel Sahbani

14 December 2016 Round of 16	FC Hammamet	2–3	Espérance de Tunis	Hammamet
13:30	Naili 44'; Salah 72'	Report	49' (pen.) Khenissi; 58' Bguir; 76' Badri	Stadium: Stade municipal d'Hammamet; Referee: Jalel Sahbani

19 February 2017 Quarter-finals	Espérance de Tunis	2–0	ES Zarzis	Radès
16:30	Dhaouadi 63'; Bguir 81'	Report		Stadium: Stade Olympique de Radès; Referee: Rochdi Guezguez

28 May 2017 Semi-finals	US Ben Guerdane	0–0 (a.e.t.) (5–4 p)	Espérance de Tunis	Ben Gardane
15:30		Report		Stadium: Stade du 7 Mars; Referee: Haythem Guirat
	Penalties
	Jacob (penalty scored); Abbes (penalty scored); Coulibaly (penalty scored); Harbaoui (penalty scored); Abdessalem (penalty scored)		(penalty missed) Khenissi; (penalty scored) Sassi; (penalty scored) Ben Youssef; (penalty scored) Chaalali; (penalty scored) Chemmam

== Champions League ==
=== First round ===
11 March 2017 First leg	Espérance de Tunis (Tunisia)	3–1	(Guinea) Horoya	Radès
18:00 UTC+1	Sassi 20', 54'; Ben Youssef 75'	Report	Mando 24'	Stadium: Stade Olympique de Radès; Referee: Mutaz Khairalla (Sudan)

19 March 2017 Second leg	Horoya (Guinea)	2–1	(Tunisia) Espérance de Tunis	Conakry
16:00 UTC+0	Ouédraogo 30'; Mando 54'	Report	Mbarki 45'	Stadium: Stade du 28 Septembre; Referee: Bakary Gassama (Gambia)

=== Group stage ===
==== Group C ====
Pos	Team	Pld	W	D	L	GF	GA	GD	Pts	Qualification	EST	MSD	STG	VIT
1	(Tunisia) Espérance de Tunis	6	3	3	0	11	4	+7	12	Quarter-finals	—	0–0	4–0	3–1
2	(South Africa) Mamelodi Sundowns	6	2	3	1	6	4	+2	9	Quarter-finals	1–2	—	0–0	1–1
3	(Ethiopia) Saint George	6	1	2	3	2	7	−5	5 (Note: Head-to-head results: Saint George 1–0 AS Vita Club, AS Vita Club 2–1 Saint George (Saint George won on away goals).)		0–0	0–1	—	1–0
4	(Democratic Republic of the Congo) AS Vita Club	6	1	2	3	7	11	−4	5		2–2	1–3	2–1	—

Source: CAF
Rules for classification: Group stage tiebreakers
Notes:

12 May 2017 Matchday 1	Espérance de Tunis (Tunisia)	3–1	(Democratic Republic of the Congo) AS Vita Club	Radès
16:00 UTC+1	Coulibaly 19'; Khenissi 26' (pen.); Badri 86'	Report	Atouba 9'	Stadium: Stade Olympique de Radès; Referee: Ali Lemghaifry (Mauritania)

23 May 2017 Matchday 2	Saint George (Ethiopia)	0–0	(Tunisia) Espérance de Tunis	Addis Ababa
16:00 UTC+3		Report		Stadium: Addis Ababa Stadium; Referee: Joshua Bondo (Botswana)

2 June 2017 Matchday 3	Mamelodi Sundowns (South Africa)	1–2	(Tunisia) Espérance de Tunis	Pretoria
20:00 UTC+2	Vilakazi 21'	Report	Khenissi 6', 89' (pen.)	Stadium: Lucas Masterpieces Moripe Stadium; Referee: Maguette N'Diaye (Senegal)

21 June 2017 Matchday 4	Espérance de Tunis (Tunisia)	0–0	(South Africa) Mamelodi Sundowns	Radès
22:00 UTC+1		Report		Stadium: Stade Olympique de Radès; Referee: Thierry Nkurunziza (Burundi)

1 July 2017 Matchday 5	AS Vita Club (Democratic Republic of the Congo)	2–2	(Tunisia) Espérance de Tunis	Kinshasa
16:00 UTC+1	Etekiama 23', 30'	Report	Khenissi 10', 59' (pen.)	Stadium: Stade des Martyrs; Referee: Eric Otogo-Castane (Gabon)

== Squad information ==
=== Playing statistics ===
No.	Pos	Nat	Player	Total		Ligue 1		Tunisian Cup		Champions League	
No.	Pos	Nat	Player	Apps	Goals	Apps	Goals	Apps	Goals	Apps	Goals
Goalkeepers
1	GK	(Tunisia) TUN	Moez Ben Cherifia	36	0	24	0	5	0	7	0
23	GK	(Tunisia) TUN	Ali Jemal	2	0	0	0	2	0	0	0
Defenders
5	DF	(Tunisia) TUN	Chamseddine Dhaouadi	34	2	23	1	5	1	6	0
2	DF	(Tunisia) TUN	Ali Machani	25	1	15	1	3	0	7	0
27	DF	(Algeria) ALG	Hichem Belkaroui	15	0	11	0	4	0	0	0
3	DF	(Tunisia) TUN	Ferid Matri	0	0	0	0	0	0	0	0
4	DF	(Tunisia) TUN	Montassar Talbi	14	0	6	0	2	0	6	0
24	DF	(Tunisia) TUN	Iheb Mbarki	37	1	24	0	6	0	7	1
	DF	(Tunisia) TUN	Amine Nefzi	0	0	0	0	0	0	0	0
	DF	(Tunisia) TUN	Hatem Bejaoui	0	0	0	0	0	0	0	0
12	DF	(Tunisia) TUN	Khalil Chemmam	20	1	20	1	0	0	0	0
26	DF	(Tunisia) TUN	Houcine Rabii	5	0	5	0	0	0	0	0
20	DF	(Tunisia) TUN	Ayman Ben Mohamed	3	0	3	0	0	0	0	0
Midfielders
15	MF	(Ivory Coast) CIV	Fousseny Coulibaly	19	0	19	0	0	0	0	0
	MF	(Tunisia) TUN	Monther Guesmi	1	0	1	0	0	0	0	0
13	MF	(Tunisia) TUN	Ferjani Sassi	23	3	23	3	0	0	0	0
25	MF	(Tunisia) TUN	Ghailene Chaalali	21	1	21	1	0	0	0	0
7	MF	(Tunisia) TUN	Edem Rjaibi	16	1	16	1	0	0	0	0
	MF	(Tunisia) TUN	Youssef Khemiri	0	0	0	0	0	0	0	0
18	MF	(Tunisia) TUN	Saad Bguir	19	4	19	4	0	0	0	0
10	MF	(Tunisia) TUN	Elyas Jelassi	10	0	10	0	0	0	0	0
	MF	(Nigeria) NGR	Bernard Bulbwa	1	0	1	0	0	0	0	0
21	MF	(Tunisia) TUN	Mohamed Ali Moncer	11	1	11	1	0	0	0	0
Forwards
11	FW	(Tunisia) TUN	Fakhreddine Ben Youssef	19	6	10	5	2	0	7	1
8	FW	(Tunisia) TUN	Anice Badri	33	7	21	5	5	1	7	1
22	FW	(Libya) LBA	Mohamed Zubya	17	0	14	0	2	0	1	0
29	FW	(Tunisia) TUN	Taha Yassine Khenissi	36	24	23	14	6	5	7	5
9	FW	(Tunisia) TUN	Bilel Mejri	11	2	8	0	2	2	1	0
Players transferred out during the season

Last updated: 8 June 2020

=== Goalscorers ===
Includes all competitive matches. The list is sorted alphabetically by surname when total goals are equal.

No.	Nat.	Player	Pos.	L 1	TC	CL 1	TOTAL
29	(Tunisia)	Taha Yassine Khenissi	FW	14	5	5	24
8	(Tunisia)	Anice Badri	FW	5	1	1	7
11	(Tunisia)	Fakhreddine Ben Youssef	FW	5	0	1	6
18	(Tunisia)	Saad Bguir	MF	4	2	0	6
13	(Tunisia)	Ferjani Sassi	MF	3	0	2	5
7	(Tunisia)	Edem Rjaibi	MF	1	2	0	3
5	(Tunisia)	Chamseddine Dhaouadi	DF	1	1	0	2
9	(Tunisia)	Bilel Mejri	MF	0	2	0	2
25	(Tunisia)	Ghailene Chaalali	MF	1	0	0	1
21	(Tunisia)	Mohamed Ali Moncer	MF	1	0	0	1
2	(Tunisia)	Ali Machani	DF	1	0	0	1
12	(Tunisia)	Khalil Chemmam	DF	1	0	0	1
10	(Tunisia)	Elyas Jelassi	MF	0	1	0	1
24	(Tunisia)	Iheb Mbarki	DF	0	0	1	1
15	(Ivory Coast)	Fousseny Coulibaly	MF	0	0	1	1
Own Goals				0	0	0	0
Totals				37	14	11	62

== Transfers ==
=== In ===
Date	Pos	Player	From club	Transfer fee	Source
2 July 2016	MF	(Tunisia) Malek Miladi	EO Sidi Bouzid	Free transfer	
2 July 2016	MF	(Tunisia) Youssef Khemiri	EO Sidi Bouzid	Free transfer	
9 July 2016	MF	(Tunisia) Ferjani Sassi	(France) FC Metz	Free transfer	
26 July 2016	DF	(Algeria) Hichem Belkaroui	(Portugal) Nacional	Free transfer	
2 August 2016	FW	(Libya) Mohamed Zubya	(Algeria) MC Oran	Free transfer	
2 August 2016	FW	(Tunisia) Anice Badri	(Belgium) Royal Excel Mouscron	Free transfer	
2 August 2016	MF	(Tunisia) Ayman Ben Mohamed	(Republic of Ireland) Bohemian	Free transfer	
2 August 2016	MF	(Tunisia) Mohamed Ali Moncer	CS Sfaxien	Free transfer	
15 January 2017	DF	(Tunisia) Ferid Matri	(Switzerland) FC Luzern	Free transfer	

=== Out ===
Date	Pos	Player	To club	Transfer fee	Source
18 June 2016	FW	(Mali) Nouhoum Samassékou	US Tataouine	Free transfer	
1 July 2016	FW	(Guinea) Daouda Camara	US Tataouine	Free transfer	
1 July 2016	DF	(Tunisia) Ali Abdi	Club Africain	Free transfer	
19 July 2016	MF	(Tunisia) Nidhal Ben Salem	Olympique Béja	Free transfer	
19 July 2016	MF	(Tunisia) Hamza Ben Cherifia	Olympique Béja	Free transfer	
25 July 2016	MF	(Tunisia) Idriss Mhirsi	(France) Red Star	Free transfer	
26 July 2016	DF	(Tunisia) Mohamed Ali Yacoubi	(Turkey) Çaykur Rizespor	Free transfer	
28 July 2016	MF	(Tunisia) Hocine Ragued	(United Arab Emirates) Emirates Club	Free transfer	
29 August 2016	FW	(Nigeria) Samuel Eduok	(Turkey) Kasımpaşa	Free transfer	
13 September 2016	DF	(Tunisia) Sameh Derbali	Olympique Béja	Free transfer	
15 September 2016	MF	(Tunisia) Radhouène Khalfaoui	Olympique Béja	Free transfer	
19 September 2016	DF	(Mali) Ichaka Diarra	(Moldova) Speranța Nisporeni	Free transfer	
