= 2017–18 Tunisian Super Cup =

- The Abdullah bin Khalifa Stadium in Doha, Qatar hosted the match
- Event: Tunisian Super Cup
| Espérance de Tunis | CA Bizertin |
| 2 | 1 |
- Date: 1 April 2019
- Venue: Abdullah bin Khalifa Stadium, Doha
- Referee: Youssef Serairi
- Weather: Cloudy overall 33 °C (91 °F); 34% humidity

The 2017–18 Tunisian Super Cup was the 14th edition of the Tunisian Super Cup, a football match contested by the winners of the 2017–18 Tunisian Ligue Professionnelle 1 and 2017–18 Tunisian Cup competitions. The match was played on April 1, 2019, at Abdullah bin Khalifa Stadium in Doha, Qatar, between 2017 and 2018 Ligue Professionnelle 1 winners, Espérance de Tunis, and CA Bizertin, semifinalist of the 2017–18 Tunisian Cup, as an alternative to Club Africain, the winners of said tournament. Esperance won the title for the fourth time in its history in the first edition since 18 years.

== Pre-match ==
The match was supposed to be played between the 2017–18 Tunisian Ligue Professionnelle 1 champion, Espérance de Tunis, and the 2017–18 Tunisian Cup champion, Club Africain, but the match was postponed several times due to the critical financial and administrative situation for Club Africain, and finally withdrew from the Super Cup.

The second choice was made for the runner-up of the 2017–18 Tunisian Cup, Étoile du Sahel. The invitation was rejected due to the overcrowding of the calendar. Finally, a solution was reached with the CA Bizertin, one of the semi-finalist of the 2017–18 Tunisian Cup, to occupy that place and compete in the 2017–18 Tunisian Super Cup.

== Match details ==
1 April 2019
20:00 UTC+3

| Espérance de Tunis | 2–1 | CA Bizertin |
|---|---|---|
| Badri 13'; Khenissi 16' | Report | Darragi 34' (pen.) |

Abdullah bin Khalifa Stadium, Doha
Referee: Youssef Serairi

| GK | 1 | (Tunisia) Moez Ben Cherifia |
| DF | 3 | (Tunisia) Aymen Mahmoud |
| DF | 5 | (Tunisia) Chamseddine Dhaouadi (c) |
| MF | 8 | (Tunisia) Anice Badri | | (substituted off) 63' |
| FW | 11 | (Tunisia) Taha Yassine Khenissi | | (substituted off) 87' |
| MF | 15 | (Ivory Coast) Fousseny Coulibaly | | (substituted off) 62' |
| MF | 18 | (Tunisia) Saad Bguir |
| MF | 20 | (Tunisia) Ayman Ben Mohamed |
| DF | 24 | (Tunisia) Iheb Mbarki | (yellow card) 79' |
| FW | 10 | (Algeria) Youcef Belaïli | (yellow card) 52' |
| MF | 25 | (Tunisia) Ghailene Chaalali |
Substitutes :
| GK | 19 | (Tunisia) Rami Jridi |
| DF | 2 | (Tunisia) Ali Machani |
| FW | 14 | (Tunisia) Haythem Jouini | | (substituted on) 87' |
| MF | 17 | (Libya) Hamdou Elhouni | | (substituted on) 63' |
| MF | 28 | (Tunisia) Mohamed Amine Meskini |
| FW | 29 | (Nigeria) Junior Lokosa |
| MF | 30 | (Cameroon) Franck Kom | | (substituted on) 62' |
Manager :
(Tunisia) Moïne Chaâbani

| GK | 32 | (Tunisia) Khemais Thamri (c) |
| DF | 4 | (Tunisia) Seddik Mejri |
| DF | 6 | (Senegal) Aliou Cissé | (yellow card) 79' |
| DF | 7 | (Tunisia) Mohamed Habib Yeken |
| FW | 9 | (Ivory Coast) Ibrahim Ouattara |
| FW | 11 | (Tunisia) Wajdi Jabbari |
| DF | 15 | (Tunisia) Wissem Bousnina | (yellow card) 46' (yellow-red card) 50' |
| MF | 19 | (Tunisia) Fedi Ben Choug |
| FW | 21 | (Tunisia) Houssem Habbassi | | (substituted off) 74' |
| MF | 22 | (Tunisia) Fahmi Maaouani |
| MF | 28 | (Tunisia) Abdelhalim Darragi |
Substitutes :
| GK | 33 | (Tunisia) Naim Mahtlouthi |
| MF | 8 | (Tunisia) Radhouane Khalfaoui |
| MF | 10 | (Tunisia) Chamseddine Samti |
| MF | 17 | (Senegal) Youssoupha Mbengue |
| MF | 23 | (Tunisia) Oussama Amdouni | | (substituted on) 74' |
| FW | 27 | (Tunisia) Othmane Saidi |
| DF | 30 | (Tunisia) Elyes Dridi |
Manager :
(Tunisia) Montasser Louhichi

Assistant referees:
Anouar Hmila
Aymen Ismail
Fourth official:
Salim Belkhouas

Match rules

- 90 minutes.
- Penalty shoot-out if scores level.
- Seven named substitutes, of which up to three may be used.

== See also ==
- 2017–18 Tunisian Ligue Professionnelle 1
- 2017–18 Tunisian Cup
