= Mohamed Ali Ben Romdhane =

Tunisian footballer (born 1999)

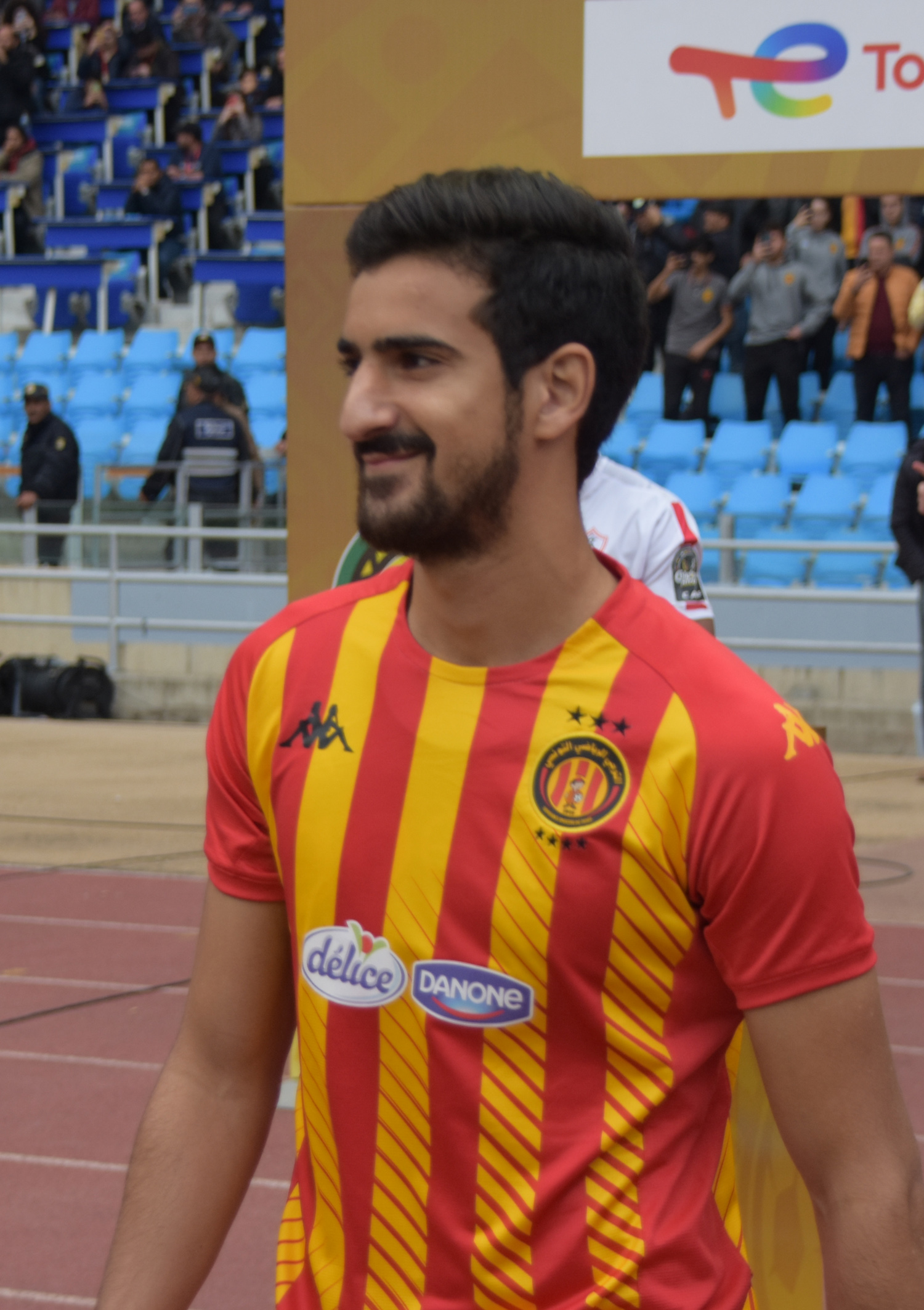
- Ben Romdhane with Esperance de Tunis in 2023

Personal information
- Full name: Mohamed Ali Ben Romdhane
- Date of birth: 6 September 1999 (age 27)
- Place of birth: Tunis, Tunisia
- Height: 1.80 m (5 ft 11 in)
- Position: Midfielder

Team information
- Current team: Al Ahly

Youth career
- Esperance de Tunis

Senior career*
Years	Team	Apps	(Gls)
2017–2023	Esperance de Tunis	93	(19)
2023–2025	Ferencváros	42	(5)
2025–2026	Al Ahly	22	(1)
2026-	Al-Shamal	11	(1)

International career^{‡}
2019–	Tunisia	58	(7)
Medal record
Representing Tunisia
Men's football
FIFA Arab Cup
Runner-up	2021 Qatar
- * Club domestic league appearances and goals as of 05 May 2026 ‡ National team caps and goals as of 05 May 2026

Mohamed Ali Ben Romdhane (Arabic: مُحَمَّد عَلِيّ بْن رَمَضَان; born 6 September 1999) is a Tunisian professional footballer who plays as a midfielder for Tunisia national team.

== Club career ==
=== Espérance de Tunis ===
Ben Romdhane played his first game with the Espérance de Tunis on 8 April 2018 against ES Métlaoui. His team won 1–0 and eventually won the title that year.

=== Ferencváros ===
On 20 April 2024, the Ferencváros–Kisvárda tie ended with a goalless draw at the Groupama Aréna on the 29th matchday of the 2023–24 Nemzeti Bajnokság I season which meant that Ferencváros won their 35th championship.

On 15 May 2024, Ferencváros were defeated by Paks 2–0 in the 2024 Magyar Kupa Final at the Puskás Aréna.

=== Al Ahly ===
Ben Romdhane made three appearances for Al Ahly in the 2025 FIFA Club World Cup scoring a spectacular goal against FC Porto in a 4–4 draw.

== International career ==
On 8 September 2025, Ben Romdhane scored a goal in the fourth minute of injury time that secured a 1–0 away win over Equatorial Guinea to send Tunisia to the 2026 FIFA World Cup.

== Career statistics ==
=== Club ===
As of 27 April 2025

Appearances and goals by club, season and competition
Club	Season	League			National cup (Note: Includes Tunisian Cup, Magyar Kupa and Egyptian Cup)		League cup (Note: Includes Egyptian League Cup)		Continental		Other		Total	
Club	Season	Division	Apps	Goals	Apps	Goals	Apps	Goals	Apps	Goals	Apps	Goals	Apps	Goals
Espérance de Tunis	2017–18	Tunisian Ligue Professionnelle 1	2	0	0	0	—		—		—		2	0
Espérance de Tunis	2018–19	Tunisian Ligue Professionnelle 1	9	0	1	0	—		1 (Note: Appearance(s) in CAF Champions League)	0	0	0	11	0
Espérance de Tunis	2019–20	Tunisian Ligue Professionnelle 1	14	1	2	0	—		8	0	1 (Note: Appearance in FIFA Club World Cup)	0	25	1
Espérance de Tunis	2020–21	Tunisian Ligue Professionnelle 1	23	5	1	0	—		11	5	—		35	10
Espérance de Tunis	2021–22	Tunisian Ligue Professionnelle 1	21	4	0	0	—		9	4	2	1	32	9
Espérance de Tunis	2022–23	Tunisian Ligue Professionnelle 1	24	9	3	2	—		11	3	—		38	14
Espérance de Tunis	Total		93	19	7	2	0	0	40	12	3	1	143	34
Ferencváros	2023–24	Nemzeti Bajnokság I	23	2	4	0	—		13 (Note: One appearance in UEFA Champions League, twelve in UEFA Conference League)	0	–		40	2
Ferencváros	2024–25	Nemzeti Bajnokság I	19	3	3	1	—		12 (Note: Two appearances in UEFA Champions League, ten appearances and 2 goals in UEFA Europa League)	2	—		34	6
Ferencváros	Total		42	5	7	1	0	0	25	2	0	0	74	8
Al Ahly	2024–25	Egyptian Premier League	—		—		—		—		0	0	0	0
Al Ahly	2025–26	Egyptian Premier League	0	0	0	0	0	0	0	0	0	0	0	0
Al Ahly	Total		0	0	0	0	0	0	0	0	0	0	0	0
Career total			135	24	14	3	0	0	65	14	3	1	217	42

=== International ===
Appearances and goals by national team and year
National team	Year	Apps	Goals
Tunisia	2019	3	0
Tunisia	2021	12	0
Tunisia	2022	8	1
Tunisia	2023	8	0
Tunisia	2024	14	2
Tunisia	2025	9	4
Total		54	7

Scores and results list Tunisia's goal tally first, score column indicates score after each Ben Romdhane goal.

List of international goals scored by Mohamed Ali Ben Romdhane
No.	Date	Venue	Opponent	Score	Result	Competition
1	14 June 2022	Panasonic Stadium Suita, Suita, Japan	Japan	1–0	3–0	2022 Kirin Cup Soccer
2	5 June 2024	Hammadi Agrebi Stadium, Tunis, Tunisia	Equatorial Guinea	1–0	1–0	2026 FIFA World Cup qualification
3	7 September 2024	Ben M'Hamed El Abdi Stadium, El Jadida, Morocco	Gambia	2–1	2–1	2025 Africa Cup of Nations qualification
4	8 September 2025	Estadio de Malabo, Malabo, Equatorial Guinea	Equatorial Guinea	1–0	1–0	2026 FIFA World Cup qualification
5	10 October 2025	Hammadi Agrebi Stadium, Tunis, Tunisia	São Tomé and Príncipe	5–0	6–0	2026 FIFA World Cup qualification
6	10 October 2025	Hammadi Agrebi Stadium, Tunis, Tunisia	São Tomé and Príncipe	6–0	6–0	2026 FIFA World Cup qualification
7	7 December 2025	Al Bayt Stadium, Al Khor, Qatar	Qatar	1–0	3–0	2025 FIFA Arab Cup

== Honours ==
Espérance de Tunis

- Tunisian Ligue Professionnelle 1: 2017–18, 2018–19, 2019–20, 2020–21, 2021–22
- CAF Champions League: 2018, 2018–19
- Tunisian Super Cup: 2018, 2019, 2021

Tunisia

- Kirin Cup Soccer: 2022

Ferencváros

- Nemzeti Bajnokság I: 2023–24, 2024–25
