= Montassar Talbi =

Footballer (born 1998)

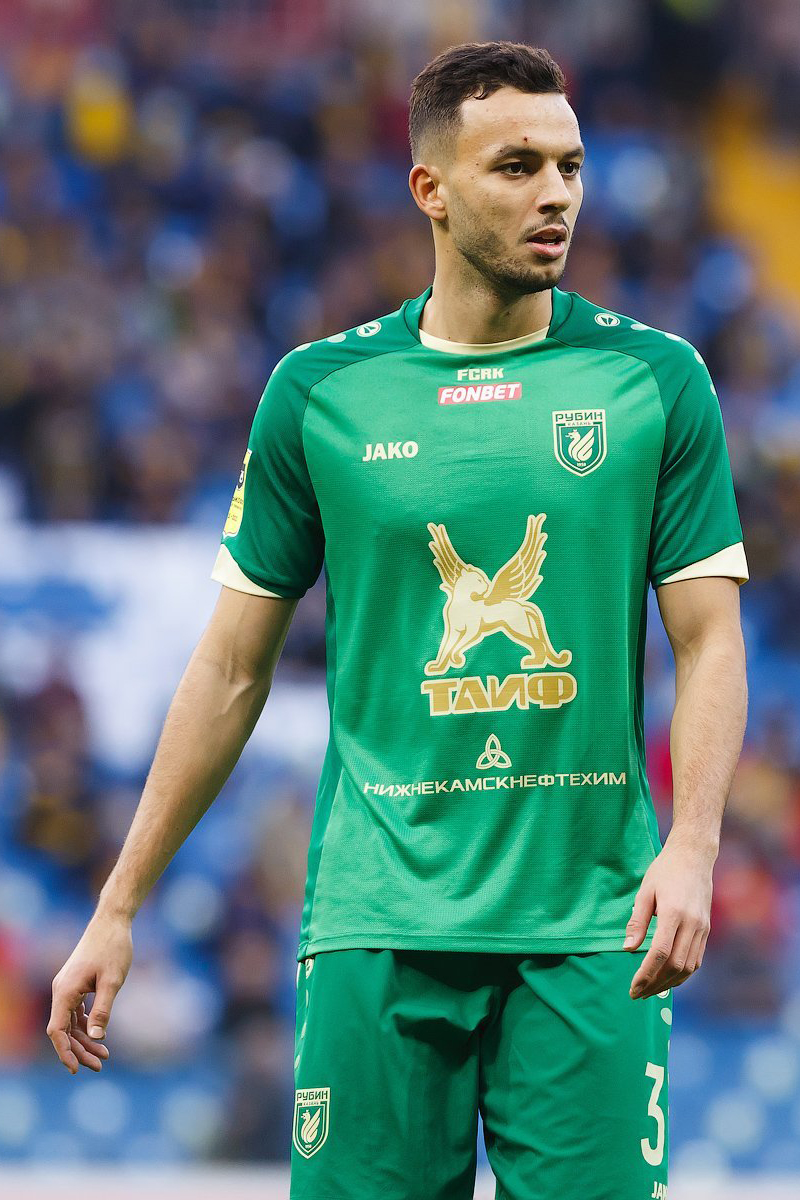
- Talbi with Rubin Kazan in 2021

Personal information
- Full name: Montassar Omar Talbi
- Date of birth: 26 May 1998 (age 28)
- Place of birth: Paris, France
- Height: 1.90 m (6 ft 3 in)
- Position: Centre-back

Team information
- Current team: Lorient
- Number: 3

Youth career
- 2003–2006: Paris
- 2006–2010: Les Lilas
- 2010–2017: Espérance de Tunis

Senior career*
Years	Team	Apps	(Gls)
2017–2018	Espérance de Tunis	14	(1)
2018–2021	Çaykur Rizespor	49	(1)
2021	Benevento	0	(0)
2021–2022	Rubin Kazan	25	(0)
2022–	Lorient	122	(2)

International career^{‡}
2018	Tunisia U23	1	(0)
2021–	Tunisia	67	(4)
Medal record
Representing Tunisia
Men's football
FIFA Arab Cup
Runner-up	2021 Qatar
- * Club domestic league appearances and goals as of 23:00, 19 May 2026 (UTC) ‡ National team caps and goals as of 21:45, 26 June 2026 (UTC)

Montassar Omar Talbi (Arabic: مُنْتَصِر عُمَر الطَّالِبِيّ; born 26 May 1998) is a professional footballer who plays as a centre-back for Ligue 1 club Lorient. Born in France, he plays for the Tunisia national team.

== Club career ==
Born in France, Talbi began playing football with the youth academies of Paris FC and Les Lilas. His family had to move back to Tunisia, and at the age of 12 Talbi moved to the academy of Espérance de Tunis, and moved up through the youth levels. Talbi made his professional debut with ES Tunis in a 0–0 Tunisian Ligue Professionnelle 1 tie with CSS on 2 April 2017. On 20 June 2018, Talbi signed for Turkish side Çaykur Rizespor in the Süper Lig.

On 9 August 2021, he signed a four-year contract with Russian Premier League club Rubin Kazan.

On 18 July 2022, Talbi signed a five-year contract with Lorient in France.

== International career ==
Talbi is a youth international for the Tunisia 23s and made his debut in a 2–0 friendly loss to the Italy 23s on 15 October 2018. He debuted with the senior Tunisia national team in a 2–1 2021 Africa Cup of Nations qualification win over Equatorial Guinea on 28 March 2021.

He was later included for the squad of the 2021 FIFA Arab Cup, despite not being released by the Russian club. He reunited with the team following Rubin's 2–0 away defeat to Krylia Sovetov Samara and made his debut in the cup in the semi-finals against Egypt, which was won by Tunisia 1–0.

On 15 May 2026, Talbi was named in the Tunisia squad for the 2026 FIFA World Cup.

== Career statistics ==
=== Club ===
As of match played 17 May 2026

Appearances and goals by club, season, and competition
Club	Season	League			National cup (Note: Includes Tunisian Cup, Turkish Cup, Russian Cup, Coupe de France)		Continental		Other		Total	
Club	Season	Division	Apps	Goals	Apps	Goals	Apps	Goals	Apps	Goals	Apps	Goals
Espérance de Tunis	2016–17	Tunisian Ligue 1	0	0	2	0	7 (Note: Appearances in CAF Champions League)	0	6 (Note: Appearances in Tunisian Ligue 1 championship group play-offs)	0	15	0
Espérance de Tunis	2017–18	Tunisian Ligue 1	14	1	0	0	0	0	3 (Note: Appearances in Arab Club Champions Cup)	0	17	1
Espérance de Tunis	Total		14	1	2	0	7	0	9	0	32	1
Çaykur Rizespor	2018–19	Süper Lig	1	0	4	1	—		—		5	1
Çaykur Rizespor	2019–20	Süper Lig	27	0	2	0	—		—		29	0
Çaykur Rizespor	2020–21	Süper Lig	21	1	2	0	—		—		23	1
Çaykur Rizespor	Total		49	1	8	1	—		—		57	2
Rubin Kazan	2021–22	Russian Premier League	25	0	2	0	—		—		27	0
Lorient	2022–23	Ligue 1	38	1	3	0	—		—		41	1
Lorient	2023–24	Ligue 1	25	0	0	0	—		—		25	0
Lorient	2024–25	Ligue 2	30	1	1	0	—		—		31	1
Lorient	2025–26	Ligue 1	29	0	2	0	—		—		31	0
Lorient	Total		122	2	6	0	—		—		128	2
Career total			210	4	18	1	7	0	9	0	244	5

=== International ===
As of match played 25 June 2026

Appearances and goals by national team and year
National team	Year	Apps	Goals
Tunisia	2021	10	0
Tunisia	2022	16	1
Tunisia	2023	9	1
Tunisia	2024	12	0
Tunisia	2025	14	2
Tunisia	2026	6	0
Total		67	4

Scores and results list Tunisia's goal tally first.

List of international goals scored by Montassar Talbi
No.	Date	Venue	Opponent	Score	Result	Competition
1	27 September 2022	Parc des Princes, Paris, France	Brazil	1–1	1–5	Friendly
2	20 June 2023	19 May 1956 Stadium, Annaba, Algeria	Algeria	1–0	1–1	Friendly
3	14 November 2025	Hammadi Agrebi Stadium, Radès, Tunisia	Jordan	2–2	3–2	Friendly
4	27 December 2025	Fez Stadium, Fez, Morocco	Nigeria	1–3	2–3	2025 Africa Cup of Nations

== Honours ==
Espérance de Tunis

- Tunisian Ligue Professionnelle 1: 2016–17, 2017–18
- Arab Club Champions Cup: 2017

Lorient

- Ligue 2: 2024–25

Tunisia

- Kirin Cup Soccer: 2022
- FIFA Arab Cup runner-up: 2021

Individual

- Tunisian Footballer of the Year: 2023
- UNFP Ligue 2 Team of the Year: 2024–25
