= Ali Jemal =

Tunisian footballer

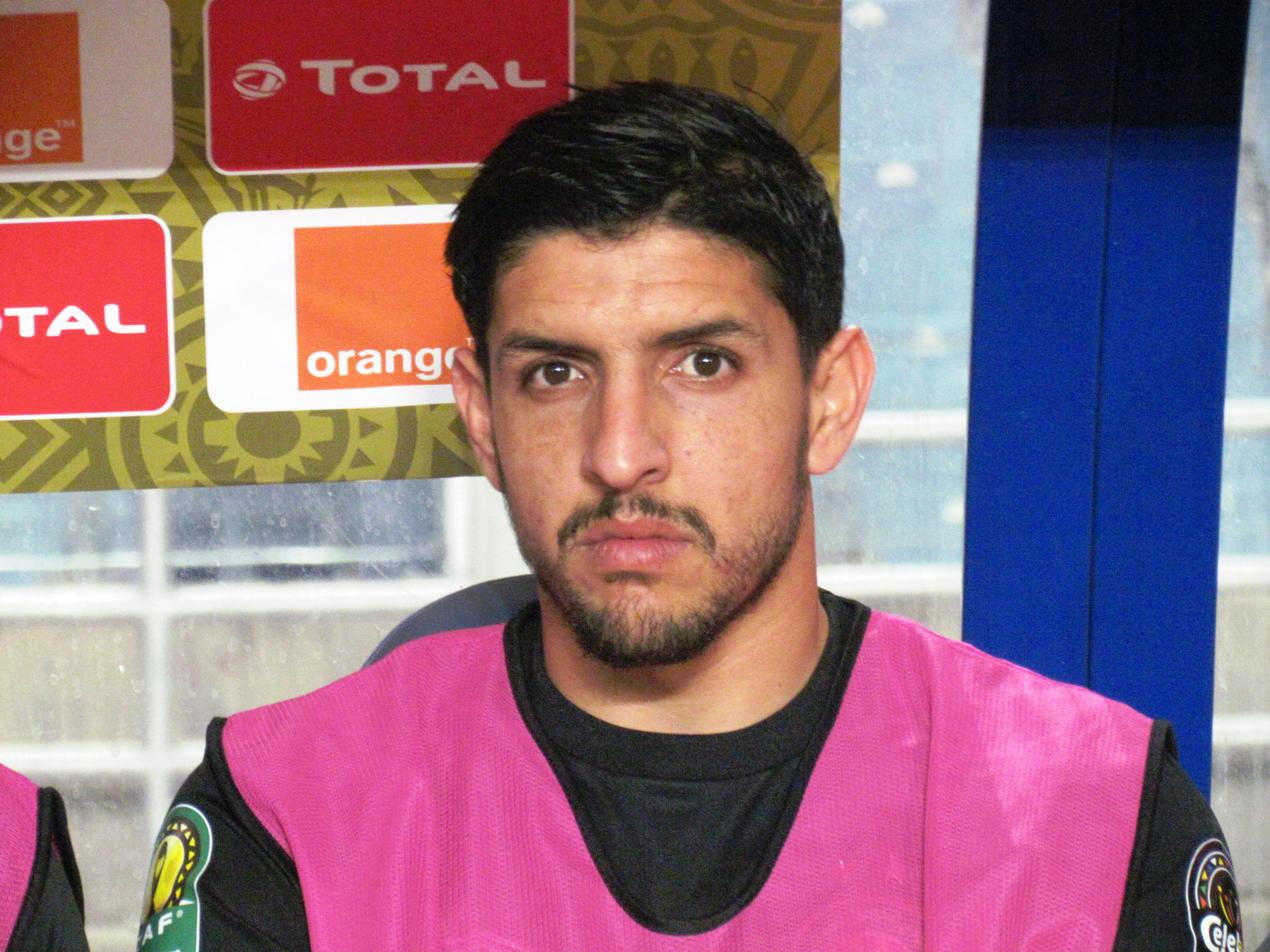
- Jemal with ES Tunis in 2018

Personal information
- Full name: Ali Jemal
- Date of birth: 9 June 1990 (age 36)
- Place of birth: Tunis, Tunisia
- Height: 1.92 m (6 ft 4 in)
- Position: Goalkeeper

Senior career*
Years	Team	Apps	(Gls)
2011–2019	ES Tunis	23	(0)
2015	US Ben Guerdane (loan)	12	(0)
2019–2021	Stade Tunisien	49	(0)
2021–2025	Étoile Sportive du Sahel	68	(0)
2025	Al-Merrikh		
- * Club domestic league appearances and goals as of 00:39, 5 September 2025 (UTC)

Ali Jemal (Arabic: علي جمل; born 9 June 1990) is a Tunisian professional footballer who plays as a goalkeeper for Étoile Sportive du Sahel.

== Career ==
Jemal was formed in ES Tunis. In July 2015 he was loaned to US Ben Guerdane. In January 2016 he made his return to ES Tunis signing a three-and-a-half-year contract.
