= Edem Rjaïbi =

Tunisian footballer

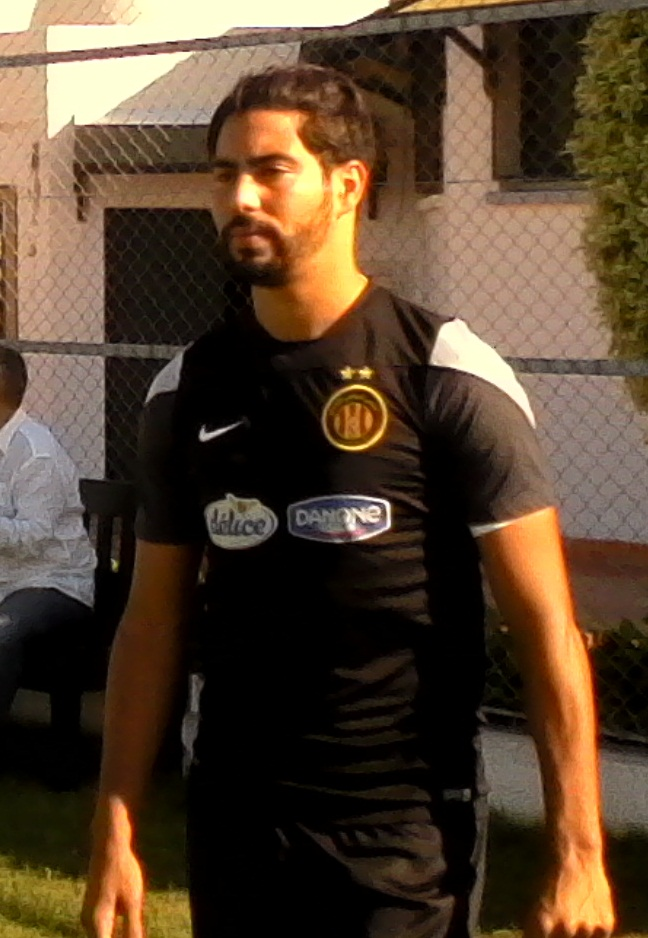
- Rjaïbi with ES Tunis in 2016

Personal information
- Full name: Edem Rjaïbi
- Date of birth: 5 April 1994 (age 32)
- Place of birth: Bizerte, Tunisia
- Height: 1.75 m (5 ft 9 in)
- Position: Forward

Senior career*
Years	Team	Apps	(Gls)
2011–2015	CA Bizertin	77	(16)
2015–2019	ES Tunis	52	(12)
2019–2020	CA Bizertin	9	(1)
2020–2022	US Ben Guerdane	20	(0)
2022–2023	Al-Sharq		

International career
2014	Tunisia	2	(0)
- * Club domestic league appearances and goals as of 16:09, 26 December 2019 (UTC)

Edem Rjaïbi (born 5 April 1994) is a Tunisian professional footballer who plays as a midfielder.

== Club career ==
Rjaïbi played for CA Bizertin in the 2013 CAF Champions League qualifying rounds. In the 2013 CAF Confederation Cup group stage Rjaïbi scored on 20 July 2013 against Fath Union Sport. He also scored in the 2014 CAF Confederation Cup qualifying rounds on 2 March 2014 in a 1–0 victory against C.D. Huíla and on 30 March 2014 in a 2–1 victory against Warri Wolves.

On 17 July 2022, Rjaïbi joined Saudi Second Division side Al-Sharq. He was released on 3 January 2023.

== International career ==
In November 2013 Rjaïbi was for the first time named in the squad of the Tunisia national team.

== Honours ==
CA Bizertin

- Tunisian Cup: 2013

Espérance Sportive de Tunis

- Tunisian Cup : 2016
