= Ferid Matri =

Swiss-Tunisian footballer (born 1994)

Personal information
- Date of birth: 16 January 1994 (age 32)
- Place of birth: Geneva, Switzerland
- Height: 1.91 m (6 ft 3 in)
- Position: Defender

Team information
- Current team: FC Lancy
- Number: 6

Senior career*
Years	Team	Apps	(Gls)
2013–2015	FC Luzern	3	(0)
2015–2015	Wil (loan)	16	(1)
2015– 2017	FC Le Mont LS	4	(0)
2017–	Espérance Sportive de Tunis	1	(1)
- * Club domestic league appearances and goals as of 26 August 2015 (UTC) ‡ National team caps and goals as of 26 August 2015 (UTC)

Ferid Matri is a Swiss footballer who plays as a defender with FC Lancy in the 4th division in Switzerland. He began his career at Saint Jean, then decided to move to Servette FC. In 2010 he signed with the French club AJ Auxerre, where he spent three years, winning the French championship U19 in 2012. He signed his first professional contract in 2013 with the Swiss Club FC Luzern. He was loaned to the FC Wil in the season 2014–2015. The next season he was loaned to the FC Le Mont Lausanne. Ferid came back to FC Luzern for his last year of contract with the club and signed to the Esperance of Tunis in January 2017. He won with the club the Arab club championship in 2017 and the Tunisian ligue 1 in 2018.

He signed with Etoile Carouge in January 2018. In summer 2018 he signed with Stade Lausanne Ouchy in promotion league (3rd Swiss division). There he won the championship playing almost all the games in the season. The next season he extended his contract of one year with the club. After six months in January 2020 he was loaned to the FC Lancy.
