= Mohamed Ali Moncer =

Tunisian footballer (born 1991)

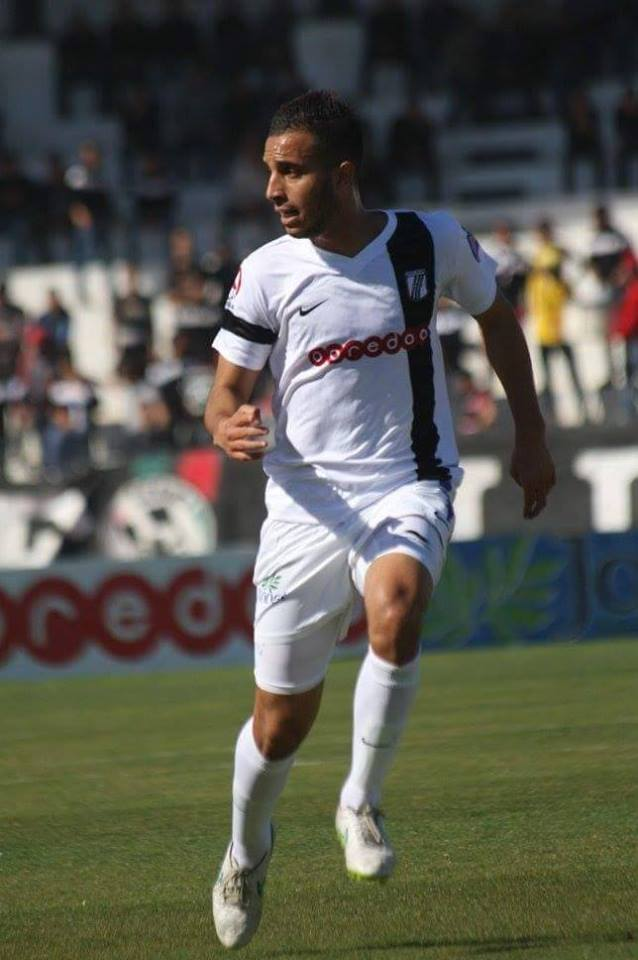
- Moncer with CS Sfaxien

Personal information
- Date of birth: 28 April 1991 (age 35)
- Place of birth: Bir Ali Ben Khelifa, Sfax, Tunisia
- Height: 1.80 m (5 ft 11 in)
- Position: Attacking midfielder

Senior career*
Years	Team	Apps	(Gls)
2009–2016	CS Sfaxien	138	(31)
2016–2018	ES Tunis	27	(1)
2017–2018	→ Al Ittihad (loan)	14	(2)
2018–2021	CS Sfaxien	43	(4)
2020	→ Al-Muharraq (loan)		
2021–2022	Al-Ain FC		
2022–2023	Mesaimeer		

International career
2015–2019	Tunisia	18	(3)
- * Club domestic league appearances and goals as of 1 July 2021

Mohamed Ali Moncer (born 28 April 1991) is a former Tunisian professional footballer who played as an attacking midfielder for the Tunisia national football team.

== Career statistics ==
Scores and results list Tunisia's goal tally first.

No.	Date	Venue	Opponent	Score	Result	Competition	Ref.
1.	18 January 2015	Estadio de Ebibeyin, Ebibeyin, Equatorial Guinea	Cape Verde	1–0	1–1	2015 Africa Cup of Nations	
2.	31 March 2015	Nanjing Olympic Sports Centre, Nanjing, China	China	1–0	1–1	Friendly	
3.	31 January 2016	Stade Régional Nyamirambo, Kigali, Rwanda	Mali	1–0	1–2	2016 African Nations Championship	

== Honours ==
CS Sfaxien

- Tunisian Ligue Professionnelle 1: 2012–13; runner-up 2013–14
- CAF Confederation Cup: 2013; runner-up 2010
- Tunisian Cup: 2018–19; runner-up 2012, 2013–14
- CAF Super Cup runner-up: 2014

ES Tunis

- Tunisian Ligue Professionnelle 1: 2017–18
