= Mohamed Amine Meskini =

Tunisian association football player

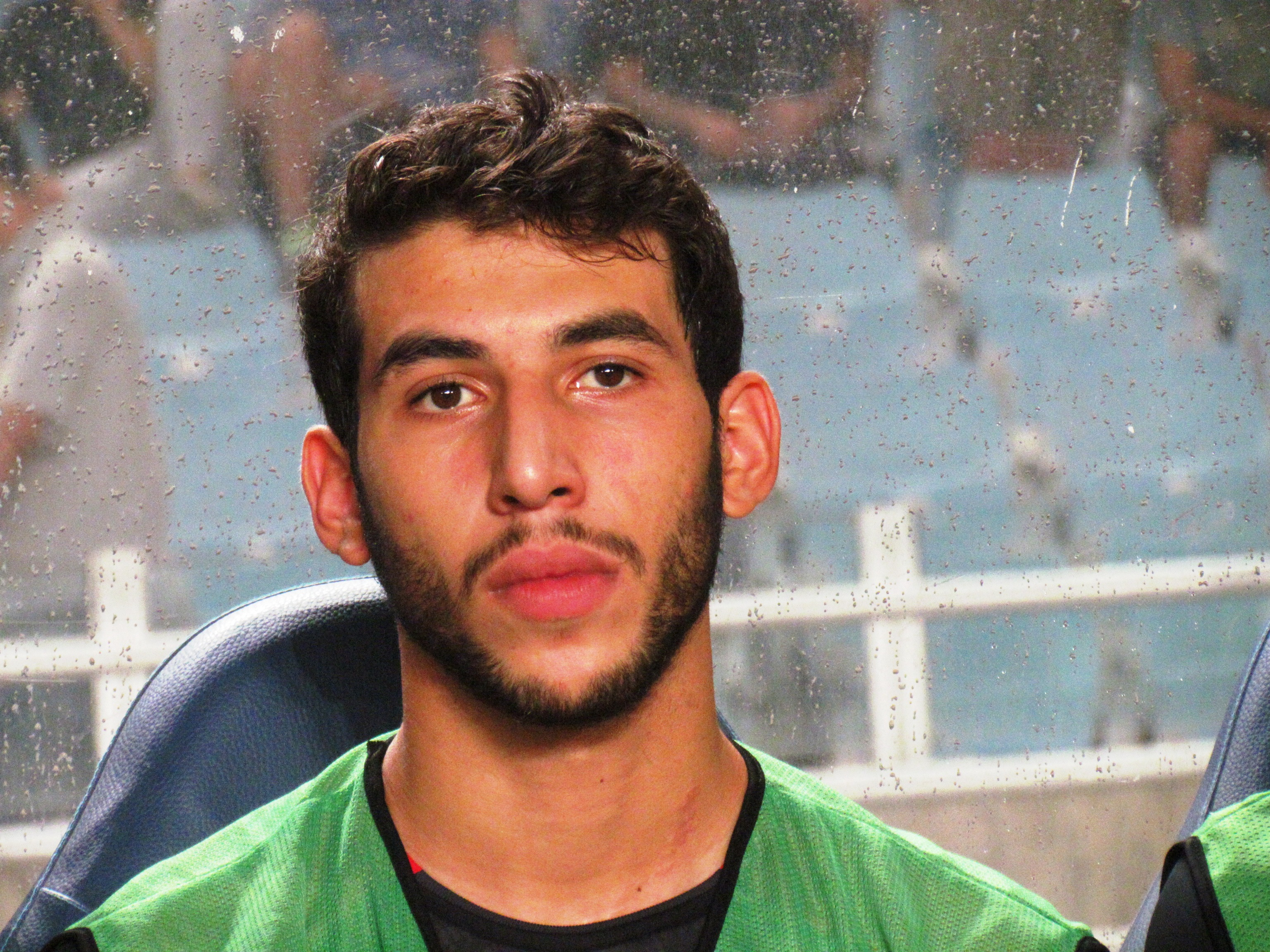

Personal information
- Full name: Mohamed Amine Meskini
- Date of birth: 5 June 1997 (age 29)
- Place of birth: Hammam-Lif, Tunisia
- Height: 1.80 m (5 ft 11 in)
- Position: Midfielder

Team information
- Current team: US Ben Guerdane

Youth career
- 2012–2015: CS Hammam-Lif

Senior career*
Years	Team	Apps	(Gls)
2015–2017	CS Hammam-Lif	19	(0)
2017–2022	Espérance de Tunis	37	(0)
2022–2023	CS Chebbien	3	(0)
2023–	US Ben Guerdane		

International career
- Tunisia U23
- * Club domestic league appearances and goals as of 26 July 2023

Mohamed Amine Meskini (Arabic: محمد أمين المسكيني; born 5 June 1997) is a Tunisian professional footballer who plays as a midfielder.
