= Chamseddine Dhaouadi =

Tunisian footballer

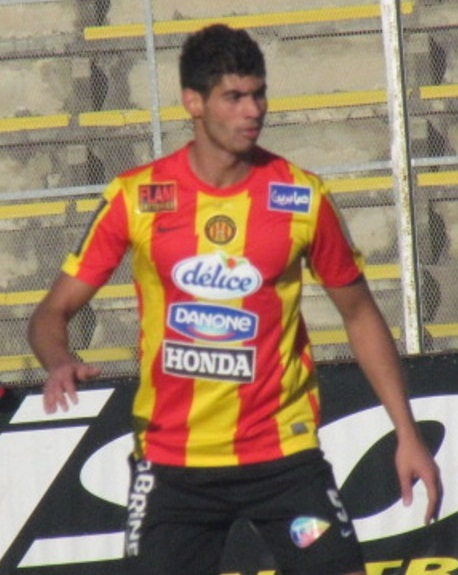
- Dohaouadi with Espérance de Tunis in 2016

Personal information
- Full name: Chamseddine Dohaouadi
- Date of birth: 16 January 1987 (age 39)
- Place of birth: Tunis, Tunisia
- Height: 1.93 m (6 ft 4 in)
- Position: Defender

Senior career*
Years	Team	Apps	(Gls)
2009–2011	Club de Hammam-Lif	27	(1)
2011–2012	Étoile du Sahel	13	(1)
2013–2020	Espérance de Tunis	143	(10)
2020–2021	Al Shamal		
2021	Al Ittihad Tripoli		

International career
2012–2019	Tunisia	11	(0)

Managerial career
- 2022: Club de Hammam-Lif (assistant)
- 2022–2023: Club de Hammam-Lif
- 2023–2026: Espérance de Tunis (assistant)
- 2026: Club de Hammam-Lif
- * Club domestic league appearances and goals

Chamseddine Dhaouadi is a Tunisian retired football player.
