= Iheb Mbarki =

Tunisian footballer

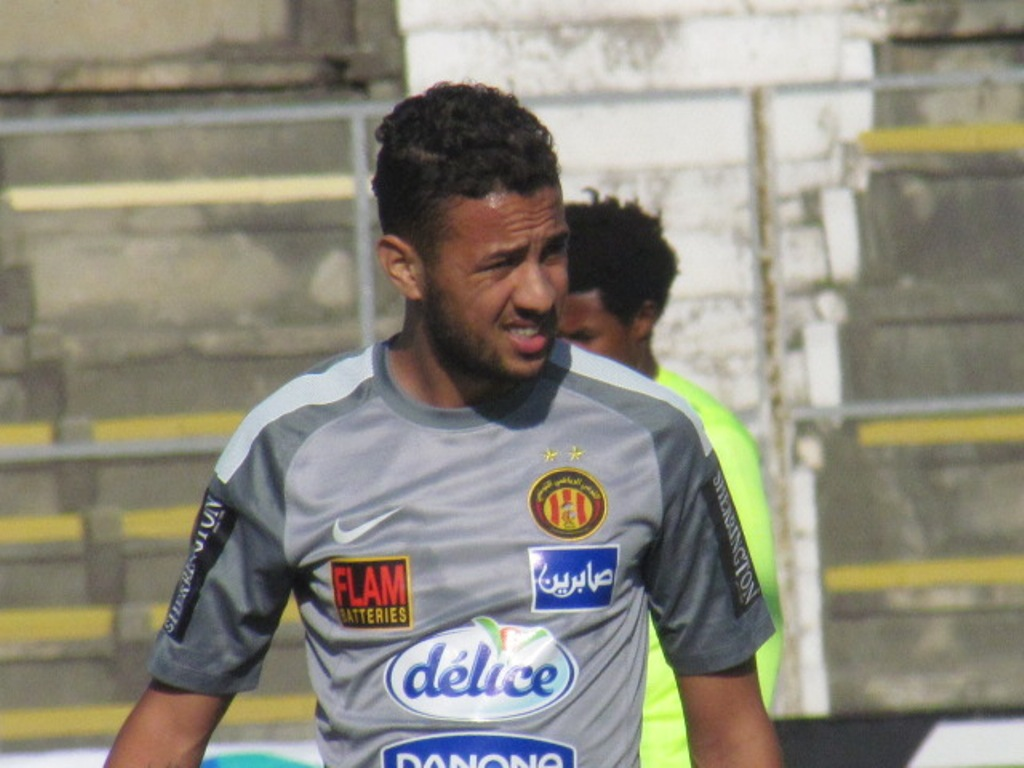
- Mbarki with ES Tunis in 2016

Personal information
- Full name: Iheb Mbarki
- Date of birth: 14 February 1992 (age 34)
- Place of birth: Bizerte, Tunisia
- Height: 1.87 m (6 ft 2 in)
- Position: Right back

Youth career
- CA Bizertin

Senior career*
Years	Team	Apps	(Gls)
2009–2012	CA Bizertin	46	(4)
2012–2013	Evian Thonon Gaillard	15	(0)
2012–2013	Evian Thonon Gaillard II	7	(0)
2013–2020	ES Tunis	93	(4)
2020–2021	Wadi Degla	20	(0)
2022	US Monastir	11	(0)
2022–2023	CA Bizertin	11	(0)

International career^{‡}
2012–2017	Tunisia	4	(0)
- * Club domestic league appearances and goals as of 30 March 2018 ‡ National team caps and goals as of 29 March 2018

Iheb Mbarki (born 14 February 1992) is a Tunisian former footballer who played as a right back.

== Club career ==
Mbarki started his career with CA Bizertin, then he played for Evian Thonon Gaillard in France, before returning to Tunisia to play for ES Tunis for seven years, where he won five Tunisian League titles, one Tunisian Cup, and two Tunisian Super Cups, in addition to two CAF Champions League and CAF Super Cup titles and one Arab Club Champions Cup. In late September 2020, he signed for Egyptian club Wadi Degla. He later returned to Tunisia, playing for US Monastir and his hometown club, CA Bizertin.

== International career ==
On 15 August 2012, Mbarki made his international debut for Tunisia in a 2–2 draw, in a friendly match against Iran.

== Honours ==
ES Tunis

- Tunisian Ligue Professionnelle 1: 2013–14, 2016–17, 2017–18, 2018–19, 2019–20
- Tunisian Cup: 2015–16
- Tunisian Super Cup: 2019, 2020
- CAF Champions League: 2018, 2018–19
- CAF Super Cup: 2019, 2020
- Arab Club Champions Cup: 2017
