= Taha Yassine Khenissi =

Tunisian footballer (born 1992)

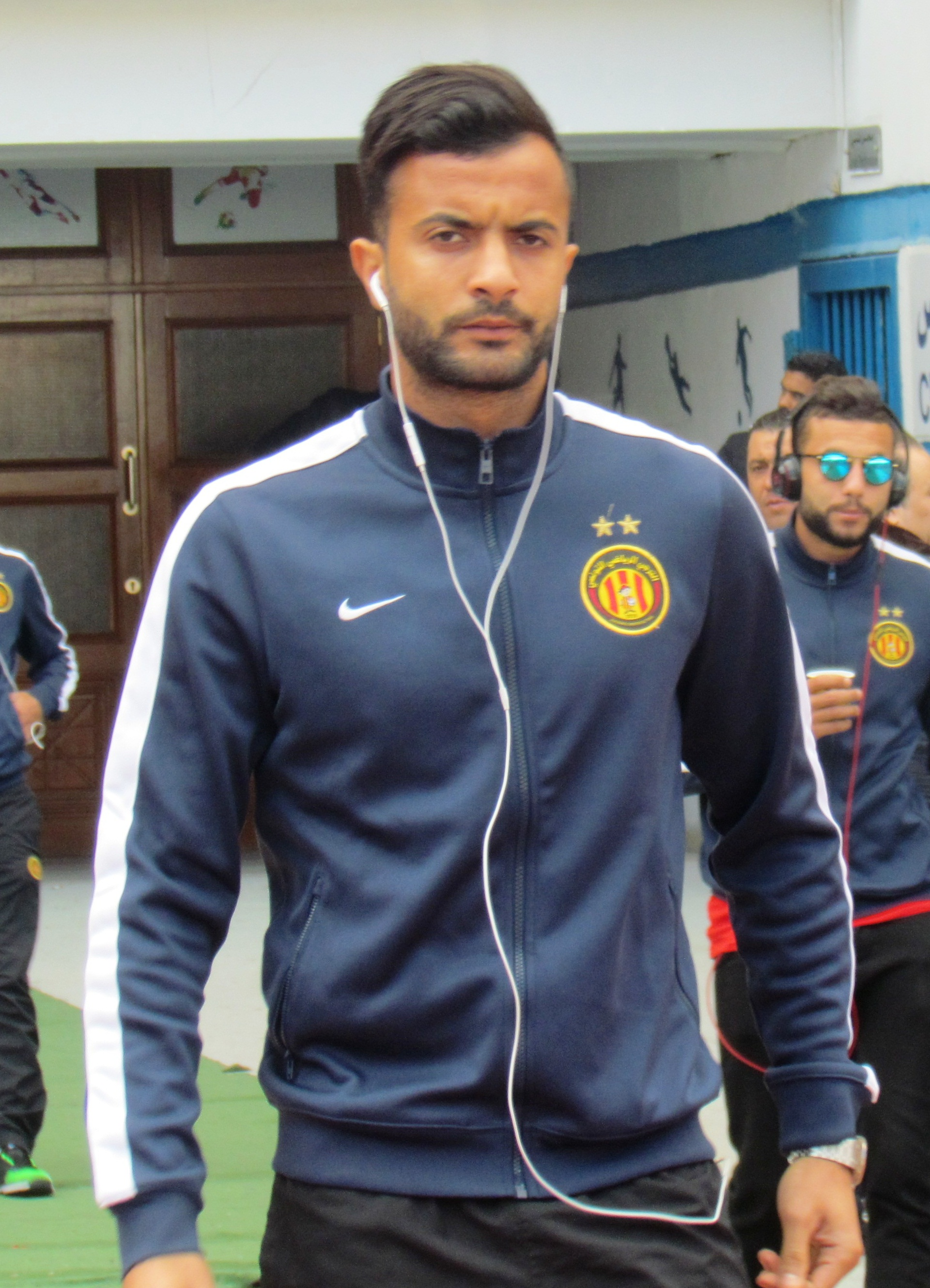
- Khenissi with Espérance de Tunis in 2017

Personal information
- Full name: Taha Yassine Khenissi
- Date of birth: 6 January 1992 (age 34)
- Place of birth: Zarzis, Tunisia
- Height: 1.80 m (5 ft 11 in)
- Position: Forward

Team information
- Current team: Kuwait SC
- Number: 27

Senior career*
Years	Team	Apps	(Gls)
2009–2012	Espérance de Tunis	7	(0)
2012–2015	CS Sfaxien	54	(12)
2015–2021	Espérance de Tunis	119	(57)
2022–	Kuwait SC	89	(80)

International career^{‡}
2013–2024	Tunisia	54	(9)
- * Club domestic league appearances and goals as of 15 January 2025 ‡ National team caps and goals as of 17:59, 30 May 2026 (UTC)

Taha Yassine Khenissi (Arabic: طه ياسين الخنيسي; born 6 January 1992) is a Tunisian professional footballer who plays as a forward.

== International career ==
As of 20 December 2020, Khenissi has 41 caps with his country, and has scored 8 goals.

== Career statistics ==
As of match played on 15 January 2025

Appearances and goals by club, season and competition
Club	Season	League			Cup		Continental		Other		Total	
Club	Season	Division	Apps	Goals	Apps	Goals	Apps	Goals	Apps	Goals	Apps	Goals
EST	2009–10	TLP1	3	0	0	0	0	0	—		3	0
EST	2010–11	TLP1	3	0	0	0	1 (Note: Appearances in CAF Champions League)	0	—		4	0
EST	2011–12	TLP1	1	0	0	0	0	0	—		1	0
EST	Total		7	0	0	0	1	0	0	0	8	0
CSS	2011–12	TLP1	3	1	0	0	—		—		3	1
CSS	2012–13	TLP1	16	6	0	0	8 (Note: Appearances in CAF Confederation Cup)	4	—		24	10
CSS	2013–14	TLP1	15	2	5	0	7 (Note: Appearances in CAF Champions League)	1	1 (Note: 1 Appearance in CAF Super Cup)	0	28	3
CSS	2014–15	TLP1	20	3	0	0	6 (Note: 4 Appearances in CAF Champions League, 2 Appearances in CAF Confederation Cup)	2 (Note: 1 Goal in CAF Champions League, 1 Goal in CAF Confederation Cup)	—		26	5
CSS	Total		54	12	5	0	21	7	0	0	80	19
EST	2015–16	TLP1	24	12	4	5	4 (Note: Appearances in CAF Confederation Cup)	2	—		32	19
EST	2016–17	TLP1	23	14	3	1	9 (Note: Appearances in CAF Champions League)	7	3 (Note: Appearances in Arab Club Champions Cup)	2	38	24
EST	2017–18	TLP1	17	9	0	0	14 (Note: Appearances in CAF Champions League)	0	2 (Note: Appearances in Arab Club Champions Cup)	0	33	9
EST	2018–19	TLP1	14	10	1	1	11 (Note: Appearances in CAF Champions League)	2	4 (Note: 1 Appearance in CAF Super Cup, 2 Appearances in FIFA Club World Cup, 1 Appearance in Tunisian Super Cup)	1 (Note: 1 Goal in Tunisian Super Cup)	30	14
EST	2019–20	TLP1	20	5	5	1	6 (Note: Appearances in CAF Champions League)	0	6 (Note: 3 Appearances in Arab Club Champions Cup, 1 Appearance in CAF Super Cup ,2 Appearances in FIFA Club World Cup, 1 Appearance in Tunisian Super Cup)	2 (Note: 2 Goals in Arab Club Champions Cup)	37	8
EST	2020–21	TLP1	21	7	0	0	9 (Note: Appearances in CAF Champions League)	1	—		30	8
EST	Total		119	57	13	8	53	12	15	5	200	82
Kuwait	2021–22	KPL	8	8	3 (Note: 2 Appearances in Kuwait Crown Prince Cup, 1 Appearance in Kuwait Emir Cup)	1 (Note: 1 Goal in Kuwait Crown Prince Cup)	3 (Note: Appearances in AFC Cup)	2	1 (Note: Appearances in Kuwait Federation Cup)	3	15	14
Kuwait	2022–23	KPL	19	20	3 (Note: 1 Appearance in Kuwait Crown Prince Cup, 2 Appearances in Kuwait Emir Cup)	5 (Note: 2 Goals in Kuwait Crown Prince Cup, 3 Goals in Kuwait Emir Cup)	—		6 (Note: 4 Appearances in Arab Club Champions Cup, 1 Appearance in Kuwait Super Cup, 1 Appearance in Kuwait Federation Cup)	5 (Note: 3 Goals in Arab Club Champions Cup, 1 Goal in Kuwait Super Cup 1 Goal in Kuwait Federation Cup)	28	30
Kuwait	2023–24	KPL	10	9	0	0	5 (Note: Appearances in AFC Cup)	3	3 (Note: 3 Appearances in Arab Club Champions Cup)	1	18	13
Kuwait	2024–25	KPL	6	4	0	0	7	1	0	0	13	5
Kuwait	Total		43	41	6	6	15	6	10	9	74	62
Career totals			223	109	23	14	90	27	23	13	354	163

=== International ===
As of matches played on 5 May 2023

Appearances and goals by national team and year
National team	Year	Apps	Goals
Tunisia	2013	1	0
Tunisia	2014	0	0
Tunisia	2015	8	1
Tunisia	2016	3	2
Tunisia	2017	11	2
Tunisia	2018	5	1
Tunisia	2019	13	2
Tunisia	2022	9	1
Total		50	9

As of 5 May 2023
Scores and results list Tunisia's goal tally first, score column indicates score after each Template Khenissi.

List of international goals scored by Taha Yassine Khenissi
No.	Date	Venue	Cap	Opponent	Score	Result	Competition
1	9 October 2015	Stade 7 November, Radès, Tunisia	5	Gabon	1–0	3–3	Friendly
2	3 June 2016	Stade du Ville, Djibouti City, Djibouti	10	Djibouti	3–0	3–0	2017 Africa Cup of Nations qualification
3	4 September 2016	Stade Mustapha Ben Jannet, Monastir, Tunisia	11	Liberia	2–0	4–1	2017 Africa Cup of Nations qualification
4	23 January 2017	Stade d'Angondjé, Libreville, Gabon	16	Zimbabwe	3–0	4–2	2017 Africa Cup of Nations
5	11 June 2017	Stade 7 November, Radès, Tunisia	20	Egypt	1–0	1–0	2019 Africa Cup of Nations qualification
6	9 September 2018	Mavuso Sports Centre, Manzini, Swaziland	26	Swaziland	1–0	2–0	2019 Africa Cup of Nations qualification
7	17 June 2019	Stade Olympique de Radès, Radès, Tunisia	31	Burundi	1–0	2–1	Friendly
8	8 July 2019	Ismailia Stadium, Ismailia, Egypt	34	Ghana	1–0	1–1 (a.e.t.)	2019 Africa Cup of Nations
9	22 September 2022	Stade Omnisports du Chemin de Ronde, Croissy, France	47	Comoros	1–0	1–0	Friendly

== Honours ==
Tunisia

- Kirin Cup Soccer: 2022

Al-Kuwait

- AFC Challenge League: 2025-2026
