= Ali Machani =

Tunisian footballer

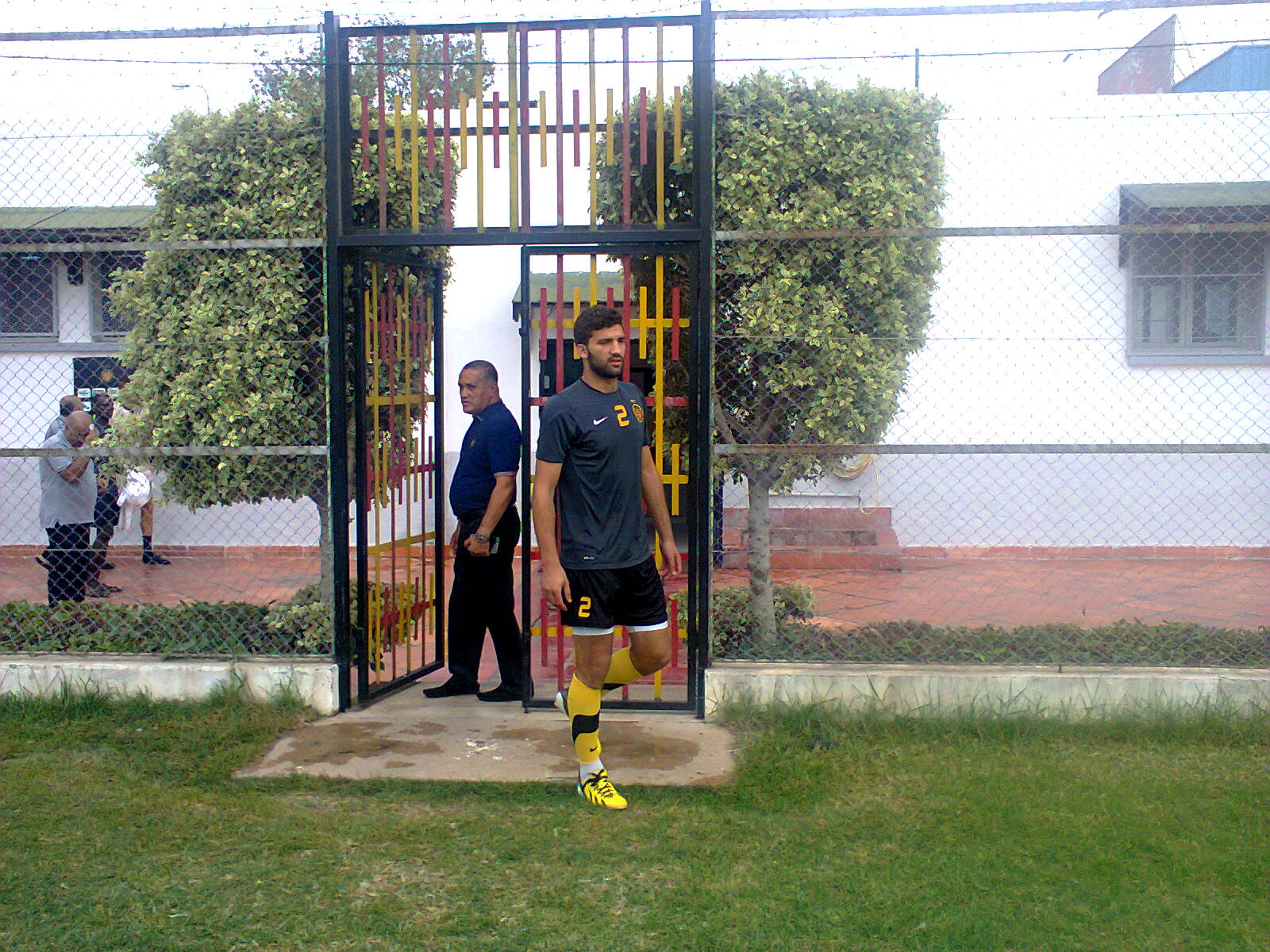
- Ali Machani in training, 2015

Personal information
- Full name: Ali Machani
- Date of birth: 12 July 1993 (age 33)
- Place of birth: Bizerte, Tunisia
- Height: 1.86 m (6 ft 1 in)
- Position: Centre back

Youth career
- CA Bizertin

Senior career*
Years	Team	Apps	(Gls)
2010–2015	CA Bizertin	62	(4)
2015–2019	ES Tunis	55	(3)
2019–2020	CA Bizertin	11	(0)
2020–2021	Al-Shahania		
- * Club domestic league appearances and goals as of 14:01, 25 February 2020 (UTC)

Ali Machani (born 12 July 1993) is a Tunisian professional footballer who plays as a centre back.

== Honours ==
CA Bizertin

Runner-up

- Tunisian Ligue Professionnelle 1: 2011–12
