= 2019–20 Espérance Sportive de Tunis season =

Espérance Sportive de Tunis
2019–20 season
- President: Hamdi Meddeb
- Head coach: Moïne Chaâbani
- Stadium: Stade Hammadi Agrebi
- Ligue 1: Winners
- Tunisian Cup: Runners–up
- Super Cup: Winners
- Champions League: Quarter-finals
- Club Championship: Second round
- Club World Cup: Fifth place
- CAF Super Cup: Runners–up
- Top goalscorer: League: Anice Badri (6 goals); All: Anice Badri (10 goals)
Home colours	Away colours	Third colours

In the 2019–20 season, Espérance Sportive de Tunis competed in the Ligue 1 for the 65th season, as well as the Tunisian Cup. It was their 65th consecutive season in the top flight of Tunisian football. They competed in Ligue 1, the Champions League, the Arab Club Champions Cup, the FIFA Club World Cup, the CAF Super Cup and the Tunisian Cup.

== Squad list ==
Players and squad numbers last updated on 18 November 2019.
Note: Flags indicate national team as has been defined under FIFA eligibility rules. Players may hold more than one non-FIFA nationality.

No.	Nat.	Position	Name	Date of Birth (Age)	Signed from
Goalkeepers
1	(Tunisia)	GK	Moez Ben Cherifia	24 June 1991 (aged 28)	(Tunisia) Youth system
19	(Tunisia)	GK	Rami Jridi	25 April 1985 (aged 34)	(Tunisia) CS Sfax
Defenders
4	(Tunisia)	CB	Amine Ben Hamida	15 December 1995 (aged 24)	(Tunisia) AS Soliman
	(Tunisia)	CB	Afif Jebali	10 January 2000 (aged 19)	(Tunisia) Youth system
5	(Tunisia)	CB	Chamseddine Dhaouadi	15 January 1987 (aged 32)	(Tunisia) Étoile Sportive du Sahel
6	(Tunisia)	CB	Mohamed Ali Yacoubi	5 October 1990 (aged 29)	(France) US Quevilly-Rouen
12	(Tunisia)	CB	Khalil Chemmam	24 July 1987 (aged 32)	(Tunisia) Youth system
22	(Tunisia)	RB	Sameh Derbali	23 November 1986 (aged 33)	(Libya) Al Ahli SC
23	(Algeria)	LB	Ilyes Chetti	22 January 1995 (aged 24)	(Algeria) JS Kabylie
24	(Tunisia)	RB	Iheb Mbarki	14 February 1992 (aged 27)	(France) Thonon Évian
26	(Tunisia)	LB	Houcine Rabii	8 November 1991 (aged 28)	(Tunisia) ES Zarzis
30	(Algeria)	CB	Abdelkader Bedrane	2 April 1992 (aged 27)	(Algeria) ES Sétif
	(Tunisia)		Malek Charfi	1 February 1997 (aged 22)	(Tunisia) ES Métlaoui
	(Algeria)	CB	Mohamed Amine Tougai	22 January 2000 (aged 19)	(Algeria) NA Hussein Dey
Midfielders
3	(Ghana)	DM	Kwame Bonsu	25 September 1994 (aged 25)	(Ghana) Asante Kotoko
15	(Ivory Coast)	DM	Fousseny Coulibaly	10 August 1989 (aged 30)	(Tunisia) Stade tunisien
17	(Libya)	LW	Hamdou Elhouni	12 February 1994 (aged 25)	(Portugal) Desportivo das Aves
29	(Tunisia)	CM	Youssef Mosrati	6 December 1999 (aged 20)	(Tunisia) Youth system
18	(Algeria)	CB / DM	Raouf Benguit	5 April 1996 (aged 23)	(Algeria) Paradou AC
27	(Tunisia)	CM	Mohamed Ali Ben Romdhane	6 September 1999 (aged 20)	(Tunisia) Youth system
28	(Tunisia)	DM	Mohamed Amine Meskini	5 June 1997 (aged 22)	(Tunisia) CS Hammam-Lif
Forwards
7	(Algeria)	LW	Billel Bensaha	18 February 1994 (aged 25)	(Algeria) DRB Tadjenanet
8	(Tunisia)	RW	Anice Badri	18 September 1990 (aged 29)	(Belgium) Royal Excel Mouscron
9	(Ivory Coast)	FW	Ibrahim Ouattara	4 August 1990 (aged 29)	(Tunisia) CA Bizertin
11	(Tunisia)	FW	Taha Yassine Khenissi	6 January 1992 (aged 27)	(Tunisia) CS Sfax
13	(Tunisia)	RW	Raed Fedaa	20 May 1997 (aged 22)	(Tunisia) Youth system
14	(Tunisia)	FW	Haythem Jouini	7 May 1993 (aged 26)	(Spain) CD Tenerife
16	(Tunisia)	FW	Zied Berrima	4 September 2001 (aged 18)	(Tunisia) Youth system
29	(Nigeria)	FW	Junior Lokosa	23 August 1993 (aged 26)	(Nigeria) Kano Pillars
25	(Tunisia)	RW	Fedi Ben Choug	12 March 1995 (aged 24)	(Tunisia) CA Bizertin
	(Tunisia)	LW	Maher Ben Seghaier	22 April 1996 (aged 23)	(Tunisia) CA Bizerte
4	(Algeria)	ST / LW	Abderrahmane Meziane	7 March 1994 (aged 25)	(United Arab Emirates) Al Ain

== Pre-season ==
20 July 2019 Friendly	Espérance de Tunis	7–0	AS Soukra	Tunis
18:00	Elhouni 24'; Bensaha 33'; Ben Choug 35', 40'; Berrima 39'; Ben Rajah 47'; Selmi 89'	Report		Stadium: Stade El Menzah
Note: Lineup for Espérance de Tunis; First half - Jeridi, Mbarki, Badrane, Dhaouadi, Chetti, Meskini, Ben Ghith, Ben Saha, Houni, Ben Choug, Berrima. Second half - Debchi, Fadaa (Adviti 70’), Ben Rajeh, Jebali, Ben Hamida, Ben Romdhane, Mosrati, Hamdi, Charnia, Besseghaier, Selmi.

1 August 2019 Friendly	Espérance de Tunis	5–0	(Saudi Arabia) Al-Nahda	Tunis
17:30	Benguit 10'; Bedrane 25'; Fedaâ 62'; Ben Choug 66', 78'	Report		Stadium: Stade El Menzah; Attendance: 0 (close doors)
Note: Lineup for Espérance de Tunis; First half - Jeridi-Mbarki, Bedrane, Dhaouadi, Chetti – Meskini, Ben Romdhane, Benguit – Ben Saha, Ouattara, Elhouni. Second half - Debchi – Derbali, Yaakoubi, Chammem, Rabii – Mosrati, Bonsu, Fedaa – Ben Choug, Jouini, Besseghaier.

3 August 2019 Friendly	Espérance de Tunis	2–0	(Saudi Arabia) Abha Club	Tunis
17:30	Bensaha 37' (pen.); Jouini 89'	Report		Stadium: Stade El Menzah
Note: Lineup for Espérance de Tunis; First half - Jeridi- Mbarki, Bedrane, Dhaouadi, Chetti – Meskini, Bonsu, Benguit – Ben Saha, Ouattara, Elhouni. Second half - Jeridi– Atvati, Yaâkoubi, Chammem, Rabii – Mosrati, Ben Romdhane, Fedaa (Berrima) – Ben Choug, Jouini, Ben Sghaier.

7 August 2019 Friendly	Espérance de Tunis	3–2	(Saudi Arabia) Hetten FC	Tunis
17:30	Jouini 4'; Ben Romdhane 18'; Elhouni 64'	Report	Muharraq 31'; Pingo 38'	Stadium: Parc Hassen Belkhodja; Attendance: 0 (close doors)
Note: Lineup for Espérance de Tunis; First half - Second half -

14 August 2019 Friendly	Espérance de Tunis	2–0	CS Hammam-Lif	Tunis
18:00	Ben Sghaïer 33'; Zarrouk 58' (o.g.)	Report		Stadium: Parc Hassen Belkhodja
Note: Lineup for Espérance de Tunis; First half - Ben Cherifia, Derbali, Ben Hmida, Yaakoubi, Chammam, Meskini, Mosrati, Ben Romdhane, Fedaa, Ben Sghaier, Jouini. Second half - Jeridi, Atvati, Jebali, Badri, Khenissi ont remplacé respectivement Ben Cherifia, Derbali, Yaakoubi, Fedaa, Jouini.

18 August 2019 Friendly	Espérance de Tunis	1–1	US Ben Guerdane	Tunis
16:30	Dhaouadi 26' (pen.)	Report	Jerbi 18'	Stadium: Stade El Menzah
Note: Lineup for Espérance de Tunis - Moez Ben Cherifia – Mbarki, Chetti, Bedrane, Dhaouadi – Bonsu, Benguit, Ben Choug – Elhouni, Bensaha, Ouattara.

== Competitions ==
=== Overview ===
Competition	Record								Started round	Final position / round	First match	Last match
Competition	G	W	D	L	GF	GA	GD	Win %	Started round	Final position / round	First match	Last match
Ligue 1	26	18	8	0	41	12	+29	69.23	—N/a	Winners	24 August 2019	13 September 2020
Tunisian Cup	5	4	0	1	8	3	+5	80.00	Round of 32	Runners–up	11 March 2020	27 September 2020
Super Cup	1	0	1	0	0	0	+0	0.00	Final	Winners	20 September 2020	
CAF Super Cup	1	0	0	1	1	3	−2	0.00	Final	Runners–up	14 February 2020	
Champions League	10	5	3	2	12	8	+4	50.00	First round	Quarter-finals	15 September 2019	6 March 2020
Club Champions Cup	4	1	3	0	5	3	+2	25.00	First round	Second round	20 August 2019	23 November 2019
FIFA Club World Cup	2	1	0	1	6	3	+3	50.00	Second round	Fifth place	14 December 2019	17 December 2019
Total	49	29	15	5	73	32	+41	59.18				

Updated to match played 27 September 2020
Source: Competitions

== League table ==
Pos	Team	Pld	W	D	L	GF	GA	GD	Pts	Qualification or relegation
1	Espérance de Tunis (C)	26	18	8	0	41	12	+29	62	Qualification for Champions League
2	Club Sfaxien	26	15	6	5	33	19	+14	51	Qualification for Champions League
3	Union Monastirienne	26	12	9	5	36	19	+17	45	Qualification for Confederation Cup
4	Étoile du Sahel	26	12	7	7	37	25	+12	43	Qualification for Confederation Cup
5	Club Africain	26	13	7	6	28	14	+14	40 (Note: Club Africain were deducted 6 points.)	

Source: les-sports.info (in French)
Rules for classification: 1) points; 2) head-to-head points; 3) head-to-head goal difference; 4) goal difference; 5) total goals; 6) fairplay ranking; 7) playoff.
(C) Champions

=== Results summary ===
Overall								Home						Away					
Pld	W	D	L	GF	GA	GD	Pts	W	D	L	GF	GA	GD	W	D	L	GF	GA	GD
26	18	8	0	41	12	+29	62	10	3	0	28	9	+19	8	5	0	13	3	+10

Last updated: 22 April 2018.
Source: Competitive matches

=== Results by round ===
Round	1	2	3	4	5	6	7	8	9	10	11	12	13	14	15	16	17	18	19	20	21	22	23	24	25	26
Ground	A	H	H	A	H	A	H	A	H	A	H	A	H	H	A	A	H	A	H	A	H	A	H	A	H	A
Result	W	W	W	W	W	W	W	D	W	W	W	W	W	D	W	W	W	D	D	D	W	D	D	W	W	D
Position	5	2	2	1	1	1	1	1	1	1	1	1	1	1	1	1	1	1	1	1	1	1	1	1	1	1

Updated to match(es) played on 22 April 2019. Source: Competitive matches
A = Away; H = Home; W = Win; D = Draw; L = Loss

=== Matches ===
Win Draw Loss

24 August 2019 Round 1	US Tataouine	0–1	Espérance de Tunis	Tataouine
16:30		Soccerway report	Salhi 78' (o.g.)	Stadium: Stade Nejib Khattab; Referee: Amir Loussif

24 September 2019 Round 3	Espérance de Tunis	2–0	CS Hammam-Lif	Rades
18:00	Ouattara 4'; Elhouni 55'	Soccerway report		Stadium: Stade Olympique de Radès; Referee: Wassim Ben Salah

24 October 2019 Round 5	Espérance de Tunis	4–1	US Ben Guerdane	Tunis
14:30	Chetti 6'; Fedaa 38'; Badri 43' (pen.), 90+4' (pen.)	Soccerway report	Wellington 49' (pen.)	Stadium: Stade El Menzah; Attendance: 0 (close doors); Referee: Haythem Kossaï

27 October 2019 Round 6	CS Sfaxien	0–2	Espérance de Tunis	Sfax
14:30		Soccerway report	Badri 45', 75'	Stadium: Stade Taïeb Mhiri; Referee: Naim Hosni

7 November 2019 Round 2	Espérance de Tunis	3–1	CA Bizertin	Tunis
14:00	Khenissi 28', 68' (pen.); Elhouni 83'	Soccerway report	Traoré 52'	Stadium: Stade El Menzah; Referee: Sadok Selmi

10 November 2019 Round 8	Stade Tunisien	0–0	Espérance de Tunis	Le Bardo
16:00		Soccerway report		Stadium: Stade Hédi Enneifer; Referee: Oussama Ben Ishak

24 December 2019 Round 12	ES Métlaoui	1–2	Espérance de Tunis	Métlaoui
14:00	Mhamdi 32'	Soccerway report	Badri 69' (pen.); Yacoubi 90+12'	Stadium: Stade municipal de Métlaoui; Referee: Rochdi Guezguez

31 December 2019 Round 13	Espérance de Tunis	7–1	JS Kairouan	Tunis
14:00	Ben Choug 20', 37'; Yacoubi 35'; Benguit 40'; Elhouni 43'; Jouini 79'; Mbarki 89'	Soccerway report	Salhi 3'	Stadium: Stade El Menzah; Referee: Oussama Razgallah

5 January 2020 Round 4	AS Soliman	0–1	Espérance de Tunis	Rades
14:00		Soccerway report	Badri 55'	Stadium: Stade Olympique de Radès; Referee: Nasrallah Jaouadi

15 January 2020 Round 7	Espérance de Tunis	1–0	Étoile du Sahel	Rades
14:00	Elhouni 32'	Soccerway report		Stadium: Stade Olympique de Radès; Referee: Bamlak Tessema Weyesa (Ethiopia)

19 January 2020 Round 9	Espérance de Tunis	2–1	Club Africain	Rades
13:00	Khenissi 29' (pen.); Coulibaly 82'	Soccerway report	Jaziri 42'	Stadium: Stade Olympique de Radès; Referee: Sidi Alioum (Cameroon)

29 January 2020 Round 10	CS Chebbien	1–2	Espérance de Tunis	Chebba
14:00	Abdessalam 46'	Soccerway report	Ouattara 32'; Ben Choug 89'	Stadium: Stade de Chebba; Referee: Haythem Guirat

5 February 2020 Round 11	Espérance de Tunis	1–0	US Monastir	Rades
14:00	Ouattara 20'	Soccerway report		Stadium: Stade Olympique de Radès; Referee: Mohamed Amine Omar (Egypt)

9 February 2020 Round 14	Espérance de Tunis	1–1	US Tataouine	Rades
16:00	Coulibaly 52'	Soccerway report	Ben Abdessalem 69'	Stadium: Stade Olympique de Radès; Referee: Khaled Gouider

19 February 2020 Round 15	CA Bizertin	0–2	Espérance de Tunis	Zarzouna
14:00		Soccerway report	Ben Choug 66'; Bensaha 67'	Stadium: Stade de Zarzouna; Referee: Amir Loussif

23 February 2020 Round 16	CS Hammam-Lif	0–1	Espérance de Tunis	Hammam-Lif
14:00		Soccerway report	Ben Romdhane 29' (pen.)	Stadium: Stade Bou Kornine; Referee: Mohamed Chaabane

1 August 2020 Round 17	Espérance de Tunis	2–1	AS Soliman	Rades
18:00	Elhouni 19'; Khenissi 34'	Soccerway report	Anaane 12'	Stadium: Stade Olympique de Radès; Attendance: 0 (close doors); Referee: Sadok Selmi

8 August 2020 Round 18	US Ben Guerdane	0–0	Espérance de Tunis	Ben Guerdane
17:00		Soccerway report		Stadium: Stade du 7 Mars; Attendance: 0 (close doors); Referee: Yousri Bouali

12 August 2020 Round 19	Espérance de Tunis	0–0	CS Sfaxien	Rades
19:10		Soccerway report		Stadium: Stade Olympique de Radès; Attendance: 0 (close doors); Referee: Youssef Sraïri

15 August 2020 Round 20	Étoile du Sahel	1–1	Espérance de Tunis	Hammam Sousse
16:30	Aribi 19'	Soccerway report	Khenissi 90+3'	Stadium: Stade Municipal Bou Ali-Lahouar; Attendance: 0 (close doors); Referee: Walid Bennani

22 August 2020 Round 21	Espérance de Tunis	2–1	Stade Tunisien	Rades
18:00	Meziane 3'; Mosrati 27'	Soccerway report	Ayouni 56'	Stadium: Stade Olympique de Radès; Attendance: 0 (close doors); Referee: Mohamed Chaabane

26 August 2020 Round 22	Club Africain	0–0	Espérance de Tunis	Rades
19:10		Soccerway report		Stadium: Stade Hammadi Agrebi; Attendance: 0 (close doors); Referee: Amir Loussif

30 August 2020 Round 23	Espérance de Tunis	1–1	CS Chebbien	Rades
19:10	Bedrane 65'	Soccerway report	Abdessalam 59'	Stadium: Stade Hammadi Agrebi; Attendance: 0 (close doors); Referee: Aymen Nasri

7 September 2020 Round 24	US Monastir	0–1	Espérance de Tunis	Monastir
16:00		Soccerway report	Ben Hammouda 90+4'	Stadium: Stade Mustapha Ben Jannet; Attendance: 0 (close doors); Referee: Youssef Sraïri

10 September 2020 Round 25	Espérance de Tunis	2–1	ES Métlaoui	Rades
16:00	Yacoubi 21'; Berrima 50'	Soccerway report	Aboudou 34'	Stadium: Stade Hammadi Agrebi; Attendance: 0 (close doors); Referee: Haythem Guirat

13 September 2020 Round 26	JS Kairouan	0–0	Espérance de Tunis	Kairouan
16:00		Soccerway report		Stadium: Stade Hamda Laouani; Attendance: 0 (close doors); Referee: Walid Jeridi

== Tunisian Cup ==
11 March 2020 Round of 32	AS Sbikha	0–2	Espérance de Tunis	Sbikha
14:00		Report	Bensaha 33'; Khenissi 80'	Stadium: Stade Municipal de Sbikha; Referee: Majdi Belhaj Ali
Note: Lineup for Espérance de Tunis - Ben Cherifia, Derbali, Ben Hamida, Tougai, Chemmam, Mosrati, Ben Romdhane, Benguit, Bensaha (Elhouni, 69'), Hammouda (Khenissi, 76'), Meziane (Ben Seghaier, 87').

15 March 2020 Round of 16	AS Marsa	0–2	Espérance de Tunis	La Marsa
12:00		Report	Benguit 31' (pen.), 90'	Stadium: Stade Abdelaziz Chtioui; Referee: Nidhal Ltaïef
Note: Lineup for Espérance de Tunis - Jridi, Mbarki, Ben Hamida, Yacoubi, Bedrane, Mosrati, Ben Romdhane, Benguit (Meskini, 90+2'), Bensaha, Ben Hammouda (Khenissi, 59'), Elhouni.

16 September 2020 Quarter-finals	Kalâa Sport	1–2	Espérance de Tunis	Kalâa Seghira
15:00	Al-Alawi 55'	Report	Ben Hammouda 44'; Elhouni 90+3'	Stadium: Stade Municipal Kalâa Seghira; Attendance: 0 (close doors); Referee: Mehrez Melki

23 September 2020 Semi-finals	CS Chebbien	0–2	Espérance de Tunis	Chebba
15:00		Report	Coulibaly 10'; Chetti 42'	Stadium: Stade de Chebba; Attendance: 0 (close doors); Referee: Nidhal Ltaïef

27 September 2020 Final	US Monastir	2–0	Espérance de Tunis	Monastir
18:00	Jlassi 38'; Amri 80'	Report		Stadium: Stade Mustapha Ben Jannet; Referee: Sadok Selmi

== Tunisian Super Cup ==
20 September 2020	Espérance de Tunis	0–0 (5–4 p)	CS Sfaxien	Rades
18:00				Stadium: Stade Hammadi Agrebi; Attendance: 0 (close doors); Referee: Naim Hosni
	Penalties
	Yacoubi (penalty scored); Benguit (penalty scored); Khenissi (penalty scored); Mimouni (penalty scored); Elhouni (penalty missed); Bedrane (penalty scored)		(penalty scored) Habbassi; (penalty scored) Harzi; (penalty scored) Amamou; (penalty scored) Jouini; (penalty missed) Amri; (penalty missed) Bakir

== CAF Super Cup ==
14 February 2020	Espérance de Tunis (Tunisia)	1–3	(Egypt) Zamalek	Al Rayyan
19:00 AST (UTC+3)	Benguit 54' (pen.)	Report	Obama 2'; Bencharki 58', 90+5'	Stadium: Thani bin Jassim Stadium; Attendance: 19,398; Referee: Victor Gomes (South Africa)

== FIFA Club World Cup ==
14 December 2019 Second round	Al-Hilal (Saudi Arabia)	1–0	(Tunisia) Espérance de Tunis	Doha
17:00 UTC+3	Gomis 73'	Report		Stadium: Jassim bin Hamad Stadium; Attendance: 7,726; Referee: Roberto Tobar (Chile)

17 December 2019 Fifth place	Al-Sadd (Qatar)	2–6	(Tunisia) Espérance de Tunis	Doha
17:30 UTC+3	Bounedjah 32' (pen.); Al-Haydos 49' (pen.)	Report	Elhouni 6', 42', 74'; Badri 13', 25' (pen.); Derbali 87'	Stadium: Khalifa International Stadium; Attendance: 15,037; Referee: Abdelkader Zitouni (Tahiti)

== Champions League ==
=== First round ===
15 September 2019 First leg	Elect-Sport (Chad)	1–1	(Tunisia) Espérance de Tunis	N'Djamena
15:30 UTC+1	Djibrine 76'	Report	Ben Choug 66'	Stadium: Stade Idriss Mahamat Ouya; Referee: Bienvenu Sinko (Ivory Coast)

27 September 2019 Second leg	Espérance de Tunis (Tunisia)	2–1	(Chad) Elect-Sport	Rades
19:00 UTC+1	Ouattara 62'; Benguit 83'	Report	Ibrahim 38'	Stadium: Stade Olympique de Radès; Referee: Tsegay Mogos Mogos Teklu (Eritrea)

=== Group stage ===
==== Group D ====
Pos	Team	Pld	W	D	L	GF	GA	GD	Pts	Qualification	EST	RCA	JSK	VIT
1	(Tunisia) Espérance de Tunis	6	3	2	1	7	3	+4	11 (Note: Head-to-head points: Espérance de Tunis 4, Raja Casablanca 1.)	Advance to knockout stage	—	2–2	1–0	0–0
2	(Morocco) Raja Casablanca	6	3	2	1	6	4	+2	11	Advance to knockout stage	0–2	—	2–0	1–0
3	(Algeria) JS Kabylie	6	2	1	3	3	7	−4	7		1–0	0–0	—	1–0
4	(Democratic Republic of the Congo) AS Vita Club	6	1	1	4	4	6	−2	4		0–2	0–1	4–1	—

Source: CAF
Notes:

30 November 2019 Matchday 1	Raja Casablanca (Morocco)	0–2	(Tunisia) Espérance de Tunis	Casablanca, Morocco
20:00 UTC+1		Soccerway Report	Badri 8'; Ouattara 15'	Stadium: Stade Mohammed V Referee: Victor Gomes (South Africa)

6 December 2019 Matchday 2	Espérance de Tunis (Tunisia)	1–0	(Algeria) JS Kabylie	Rades, Tunisia
20:00 UTC+1	Badri 73' (pen.)	Soccerway Report		Stadium: Stade Olympique de Radès; Referee: Maguette N'Diaye (Senegal)

27 December 2019 Matchday 3	Espérance de Tunis (Tunisia)	0–0	(Democratic Republic of the Congo) AS Vita Club	Rades, Tunisia
(20:00 UTC+1)		Soccerway Report		Stadium: Stade Olympique de Radès; Referee: Eric Otogo-Castane (Gabon)

11 January 2020 Matchday 4	AS Vita Club (Democratic Republic of the Congo)	0–2	(Tunisia) Espérance de Tunis	Kinshasa, Congo DR
(17:00 UTC+1)		Soccerway Report	Coulibaly 21'; Elhouni 90+11'	Stadium: Stade des Martyrs; Referee: Pacifique Ndabihawenimana (Burundi)

25 January 2020 Matchday 5	Espérance de Tunis (Tunisia)	2–2	(Morocco) Raja Casablanca	Rades, Tunisia
(20:00 UTC+1)	Benguit 32'; Ben Choug 81'	Soccerway Report	Ngah 49'; Banoun 67'	Stadium: Stade Olympique de Radès; Referee: Bakary Gassama (Gambia)

1 February 2020 Matchday 6	JS Kabylie (Algeria)	1–0	(Tunisia) Espérance de Tunis	Tizi Ouzou, Algeria
(17:00 UTC+1)	Hamroune 56'	Soccerway Report		Stadium: Stade du 1er Novembre 1954; Referee: Amin Omar (Egypt)

=== knockout stage ===
==== Quarter-finals ====
28 February 2020 First leg	Zamalek (Egypt)	3–1	(Tunisia) Espérance de Tunis	Cairo
16:00 (18:00 UTC+2)	Ounajem 31'; Bencharki 72'; Alaa 90+4' (pen.)	Report	Benguit 27'	Stadium: Cairo International Stadium; Referee: Rédouane Jiyed (Morocco)

6 March 2020 Second leg	Espérance de Tunis (Tunisia)	1–0	(Egypt) Zamalek	Rades, Tunisia
19:00 (20:00 UTC+1)	Bensaha 5' (pen.)	Report		Stadium: Stade Olympique de Radès; Referee: Mustapha Ghorbal (Algeria)

== Club Championship Cup ==
=== First round ===
30 August 2019 First leg	Al-Nejmeh (Lebanon)	1–1	(Tunisia) Espérance de Tunis	Beirut
19:00 UTC+3	Hedhli 69'	Report	Bedrane 90+2'	Stadium: Camille Chamoun Sports City Stadium; Referee: Masoud Tufaylieh (Syria)

2 October 2019 Second leg	Espérance de Tunis (Tunisia)	2–0	(Lebanon) Al-Nejmeh	Rades
19:00 UTC+1	Khenissi 19', 80'	Report		Stadium: Stade Olympique de Radès; Referee: Adel Al-Naqbi (United Arab Emirates)

=== Second round ===
3 November 2019 First leg	Olympic Safi (Morocco)	1–1	(Tunisia) Espérance de Tunis	Safi
19:00 UTC+1	El Morabit 85'	Report	Elhouni 33'	Stadium: Stade El Massira; Referee: Ali Sabah (Iraq)

23 November 2019 Second leg	Espérance de Tunis (Tunisia)	1–1 (2–4 p)	(Morocco) Olympic Safi	Rades
18:00 UTC+1	Bonsu 52'	Report	Mouaoui 20'	Stadium: Stade Olympique de Radès; Referee: Gehad Grisha (Egypt)
	Penalties
	Badri (penalty scored); Bonsu (penalty scored); Rabii (penalty missed); Jouini (penalty missed)		(penalty scored) El Morabit; (penalty scored) Sabbar; (penalty scored) Lahlali; (penalty scored) Khaba

== Squad information ==
=== Playing statistics ===
No.	Pos	Nat	Player	Total		Ligue 1		Tunisian Cup		Champions League		Championship Cup		Other (Note: Includes Tunisian Super Cup, the CAF Super Cup and FIFA Club World Cup)	
No.	Pos	Nat	Player	Apps	Goals	Apps	Goals	Apps	Goals	Apps	Goals	Apps	Goals	Apps	Goals
Goalkeepers
1	GK	(Tunisia) TUN	Moez Ben Cherifia	40	0	20	0	4	0	8	0	4	0	4	0
19	GK	(Tunisia) TUN	Rami Jridi	11	0	6	0	1	0	2	0	1	0	1	0
Defenders
4	DF	(Tunisia) TUN	Afif Jebali	0	0	0	0	0	0	0	0	0	0	0	0
5	DF	(Tunisia) TUN	Chamseddine Dhaouadi	18	0	12	0	0	0	5	0	1	0	0	0
6	DF	(Tunisia) TUN	Mohamed Ali Yacoubi	36	3	20	3	4	0	7	0	2	0	3	0
12	DF	(Tunisia) TUN	Khalil Chemmam	22	0	12	0	2	0	3	0	2	0	3	0
20	DF	(Tunisia) TUN	Amine Ben Hamida	8	0	5	0	2	0	1	0	0	0	0	0
22	DF	(Tunisia) TUN	Sameh Derbali	27	1	12	0	3	0	5	0	3	0	4	1
24	DF	(Tunisia) TUN	Iheb Mbarki	19	1	10	1	1	0	6	0	2	0	0	0
30	DF	(Algeria) ALG	Abdelkader Bedrane	33	2	15	1	3	0	8	0	4	1	3	0
20	DF	(Algeria) ALG	Mohamed Amine Tougai	7	0	4	0	3	0	0	0	0	0	0	0
13	DF	(Tunisia) TUN	Raed Fedaa	11	1	6	1	0	0	3	0	0	0	2	0
	DF	(Tunisia) TUN	Farouk Mimouni	10	0	7	0	2	0	0	0	0	0	1	0
Midfielders
3	MF	(Ghana) GHA	Kwame Bonsu	34	1	17	0	2	0	7	0	4	1	4	0
15	MF	(Ivory Coast) CIV	Fousseny Coulibaly	29	4	16	2	2	1	7	1	0	0	4	0
17	MF	(Libya) LBA	Hamdou Elhouni	39	11	17	5	5	1	9	1	4	1	4	3
18	MF	(Algeria) ALG	Raouf Benguit	42	7	21	1	5	2	8	3	4	0	4	1
26	MF	(Algeria) ALG	Ilyes Chetti	33	2	15	1	3	1	8	0	3	0	4	0
27	MF	(Tunisia) TUN	Mohamed Ali Ben Romdhane	29	1	14	1	2	0	9	0	3	0	1	0
28	MF	(Tunisia) TUN	Mohamed Amine Meskini	13	0	9	0	2	0	1	0	1	0	0	0
	MF	(Tunisia) TUN	Youssef Mosrati	16	1	10	1	4	0	0	0	2	0	0	0
25	MF	(Tunisia) TUN	Fedi Ben Choug	23	6	13	4	0	0	5	2	4	0	1	0
26	MF	(Tunisia) TUN	Houcine Errabei	13	0	8	0	1	0	3	0	1	0	0	0
Forwards
2	FW	(Tunisia) TUN	Mohamed Ali Ben Hammouda	24	2	14	1	5	1	3	0	0	0	2	0
7	FW	(Algeria) ALG	Billel Bensaha	28	3	15	1	5	1	5	1	0	0	3	0
9	FW	(Ivory Coast) CIV	Ibrahim Ouattara	33	5	17	3	2	0	10	2	1	0	3	0
11	FW	(Tunisia) TUN	Taha Yassine Khenissi	39	8	20	5	5	1	6	0	4	2	4	0
14	FW	(Tunisia) TUN	Youssef Abdelli	4	0	3	0	0	0	1	0	0	0	0	0
16	FW	(Tunisia) TUN	Zied Berrima	3	1	2	1	1	0	0	0	0	0	0	0
4	FW	(Algeria) ALG	Abderrahmane Meziane	14	1	10	1	2	0	2	0	0	0	0	0
	FW	(Tunisia) TUN	Maher Ben Seghaier	6	0	2	0	1	0	3	0	0	0	0	0
	FW	(Tunisia) TUN	Badra Mouelhi	1	0	0	0	1	0	0	0	0	0	0	0
	FW	(Algeria) ALG	Tayeb Meziani	1	0	1	0	0	0	0	0	0	0	0	0
Players transferred out during the season
14	FW	(Tunisia) TUN	Haythem Jouini	4	1	2	1	0	0	0	0	2	0	0	0
8	FW	(Tunisia) TUN	Anice Badri	20	10	9	6	0	0	5	2	4	0	2	2

Last updated: 8 June 2019
Source: fr.soccerway.com

=== Goalscorers ===
Includes all competitive matches. The list is sorted alphabetically by surname when total goals are equal.

No.	Nat.	Player	Pos.	L 1	TC	CL 1	ACL 4	CAF Super Cup	Club World Cup	TOTAL
8	(Tunisia)	Anice Badri	FW	6	0	2	0	0	2	10
17	(Libya)	Hamdou Elhouni	MF	4	1	1	1	0	3	10
11	(Tunisia)	Taha Yassine Khenissi	FW	5	1	0	2	0	0	8
18	(Algeria)	Raouf Benguit	MF	1	2	3	0	1	0	7
25	(Tunisia)	Fedi Ben Choug	FW	4	0	2	0	0	0	6
9	(Ivory Coast)	Ibrahim Ouattara	FW	3	0	2	0	0	0	5
15	(Ivory Coast)	Fousseny Coulibaly	MF	2	1	1	0	0	0	4
7	(Algeria)	Billel Bensaha	FW	1	1	1	0	0	0	3
6	(Tunisia)	Mohamed Ali Yacoubi	DF	3	0	0	0	0	0	3
30	(Algeria)	Abdelkader Bedrane	DF	1	0	0	1	0	0	2
2	(Tunisia)	Mohamed Ali Ben Hammouda	FW	1	1	0	0	0	0	2
26	(Algeria)	Ilyes Chetti	MF	1	1	0	0	0	0	2
13	(Tunisia)	Raed Fedaa	FW	1	0	0	0	0	0	1
27	(Tunisia)	Mohamed Ali Ben Romdhane	MF	1	0	0	0	0	0	1
24	(Tunisia)	Iheb Mbarki	DF	1	0	0	0	0	0	1
14	(Tunisia)	Haythem Jouini	FW	1	0	0	0	0	0	1
22	(Tunisia)	Sameh Derbali	DF	0	0	0	0	0	1	1
3	(Ghana)	Kwame Bonsu	MF	0	0	0	1	0	0	1
4	(Algeria)	Abderrahmane Meziane	FW	1	0	0	0	0	0	1
	(Tunisia)	Youssef Mosrati	MF	1	0	0	0	0	0	1
16	(Tunisia)	Zied Berrima	FW	1	0	0	0	0	0	1
Own Goals				1	0	0	0	0	0	1
Totals				41	8	12	5	1	6	73

== Transfers ==
=== In ===
Date	Pos	Player	To club	Transfer fee	Source
29 June 2019	FW	(Algeria) Billel Bensaha	(Algeria) DRB Tadjenanet	Free transfer	
29 June 2019	DF	(Algeria) Abdelkader Bedrane	(Algeria) ES Sétif	Free transfer	
2 July 2019	CB / DM	(Algeria) Raouf Benguit	(Algeria) Paradou AC	742,000 US$	
2 July 2019	MF	(Algeria) Ilyes Chetti	(Algeria) JS Kabylie	175,000 US$	
7 July 2019	FW	(Ivory Coast) Ibrahim Ouattara	CA Bizertin	Free transfer	
7 July 2019	FW	(Tunisia) Fedi Ben Choug	CA Bizertin	Free transfer	
7 July 2019	GK	(Tunisia) Sedki Debchi	AS Gabès	Free transfer	
25 July 2019	MF	(Ghana) Kwame Bonsu	(Ghana) Asante Kotoko	Free transfer	
26 August 2019	MF	(Nigeria) Samuel Atvati	Stade Gabèsien	Free transfer	
28 December 2019	DF	(Algeria) Mohamed Amine Tougai	(Algeria) NA Hussein Dey	200,000 €	
31 December 2019	FW	(Tunisia) Youssef Abdelli	(France) RC Lens	Undisclosed	
18 January 2020	DF	(Tunisia) Mohamed Ali Ben Hammouda	AS Soliman	Undisclosed	
18 January 2020	FW	(Algeria) Abderrahmane Meziane	(United Arab Emirates) Al Ain	1,500,000 US$	

=== Out ===
Date	Pos	Player	To club	Transfer fee	Source
1 June 2019	MF	(Tunisia) Saad Bguir	(Saudi Arabia) Abha Club	Free transfer	
12 June 2019	GK	(Tunisia) Ali Jemal	Stade Tunisien	Free transfer	
éè June 2019	MF	(Cameroon) Franck Kom	(Qatar) Al-Rayyan SC	Free transfer	
3 July 2019	FW	(Tunisia) Bilel Mejri	Étoile Sportive du Sahel	Free transfer	
17 July 2019	MF	(Tunisia) Khemaies Maaouani	AS Soliman	Free transfer	
20 July 2019	DF	(Tunisia) Ali Machani	(Iraq) Al-Quwa Al-Jawiya	Free transfer	
22 July 2019	MF	(Tunisia) Ghailene Chaalali	(Turkey) Yeni Malatyaspor	Free transfer	
22 July 2019	GK	(Tunisia) Sadok Yeddes	CA Bizertin	Free transfer	
1 August 2019	FW	(Tunisia) Adem Rejaibi	CA Bizertin	Free transfer	
14 August 2019	MF	(Tunisia) Ayman Ben Mohamed	(France) Le Havre AC	Free transfer	
29 August 2019	MF	(Algeria) Youcef Belaïli	(Saudi Arabia) Al-Ahli	3,300,000 €	
15 January 2020	FW	(Tunisia) Anice Badri	(Saudi Arabia) Al-Ittihad	500,000 US$	
21 January 2020	FW	(Tunisia) Haythem Jouini	(Saudi Arabia) Al-Ain	Undisclosed	
