= 2019 FIFA Club World Cup squads =

Each team participating in the 2019 FIFA Club World Cup was required to register a 23-man squad, including three goalkeepers. FIFA announced the squads on 5 December 2019.

== Al-Hilal ==
On 11 December 2019, Nawaf Al-Abed replaced the injured Salman Al-Faraj.

Manager: (Romania) Răzvan Lucescu

Note: Flags indicate national team as defined under FIFA eligibility rules; some limited exceptions apply. Players may hold more than one non-FIFA nationality.

No.	Pos.	Nation	Player
1	GK	KSA	Abdullah Al-Mayouf
2	DF	KSA	Mohammed Al-Breik
3	MF	BRA	Carlos Eduardo
5	DF	KSA	Ali Al-Bulaihi
6	MF	COL	Gustavo Cuéllar
8	MF	KSA	Abdullah Otayf
9	FW	ITA	Sebastian Giovinco
10	MF	KSA	Mohammad Al-Shalhoub (captain)
12	DF	KSA	Yasser Al-Shahrani
13	DF	KSA	Hassan Kadesh
17	DF	KSA	Abdullah Al-Hafith
18	FW	FRA	Bafétimbi Gomis

No.	Pos.	Nation	Player
19	MF	PER	André Carrillo
20	DF	KOR	Jang Hyun-soo
22	DF	KSA	Amiri Kurdi
24	MF	KSA	Nawaf Al-Abed
27	MF	KSA	Hattan Bahebri
28	MF	KSA	Mohamed Kanno
29	MF	KSA	Salem Al-Dawsari
30	GK	KSA	Mohammed Al-Waked
40	GK	KSA	Nawaf Al-Ghamdi
70	DF	KSA	Mohammed Jahfali
77	FW	SYR	Omar Kharbin

== Al-Sadd ==
Manager: (Spain) Xavi

Note: Flags indicate national team as defined under FIFA eligibility rules; some limited exceptions apply. Players may hold more than one non-FIFA nationality.

No.	Pos.	Nation	Player
1	GK	QAT	Saad Al Sheeb
2	DF	QAT	Pedro Miguel
3	DF	QAT	Abdelkarim Hassan
5	MF	KOR	Jung Woo-young
6	DF	QAT	Tarek Salman
8	MF	QAT	Ali Assadalla
9	FW	QAT	Abdulaziz Al Ansari
10	MF	QAT	Hassan Al-Haydos (captain)
11	FW	ALG	Baghdad Bounedjah
12	DF	QAT	Hamid Ismail
14	MF	ESP	Gabi
16	MF	QAT	Boualem Khoukhi

No.	Pos.	Nation	Player
19	MF	KOR	Nam Tae-hee
20	MF	QAT	Salem Al-Hajri
22	GK	QAT	Meshaal Barsham
23	MF	QAT	Hashim Ali
45	MF	QAT	Akram Afif
52	DF	QAT	Hussain Bahzad
61	MF	QAT	Mostafa Tarek
66	DF	QAT	Yasser Abubakar
83	GK	QAT	Yousef Abdullah
85	MF	QAT	Faisal Mohammed
99	FW	QAT	Rami Suhail

== Espérance de Tunis ==
Manager: (Tunisia) Moïne Chaâbani

Note: Flags indicate national team as defined under FIFA eligibility rules; some limited exceptions apply. Players may hold more than one non-FIFA nationality.

No.	Pos.	Nation	Player
1	GK	TUN	Moez Ben Cherifia
3	MF	GHA	Kwame Bonsu
5	DF	TUN	Chamseddine Dhaouadi
6	DF	TUN	Mohamed Ali Yacoubi
7	FW	ALG	Billel Bensaha
8	FW	TUN	Anice Badri
9	FW	CIV	Ibrahim Ouattara
10	FW	LBY	Hamdou Elhouni
11	FW	TUN	Taha Yassine Khenissi
12	DF	TUN	Khalil Chemmam (captain)
13	FW	TUN	Raed Fedaa
14	FW	TUN	Haythem Jouini

No.	Pos.	Nation	Player
15	MF	CIV	Fousseny Coulibaly
18	MF	ALG	Raouf Benguit
19	GK	TUN	Rami Jridi
21	GK	TUN	Mohamed Sedki Debchi
22	MF	TUN	Sameh Derbali
23	DF	ALG	Ilyes Chetti
24	DF	TUN	Iheb Mbarki
25	MF	TUN	Fedi Ben Choug
27	MF	TUN	Mohamed Ali Ben Romdhane
28	MF	TUN	Mohamed Amine Meskini
30	DF	ALG	Abdelkader Bedrane

== Flamengo ==
Manager: (Portugal) Jorge Jesus

Note: Flags indicate national team as defined under FIFA eligibility rules; some limited exceptions apply. Players may hold more than one non-FIFA nationality.

No.	Pos.	Nation	Player
1	GK	BRA	Diego Alves
2	DF	BRA	Rodinei
3	DF	BRA	Rodrigo Caio
4	DF	ESP	Pablo Marí
5	MF	BRA	Willian Arão
6	DF	BRA	Renê
7	MF	BRA	Éverton Ribeiro
8	MF	BRA	Gerson
9	FW	BRA	Gabriel Barbosa
10	MF	BRA	Diego (Captain)
11	FW	BRA	Vitinho
13	DF	BRA	Rafinha

No.	Pos.	Nation	Player
14	MF	URU	Giorgian De Arrascaeta
16	DF	BRA	Filipe Luís
19	MF	BRA	Reinier
22	GK	BRA	Gabriel Batista
25	MF	PAR	Robert Piris Da Motta
26	DF	BRA	Matheus Thuler
27	FW	BRA	Bruno Henrique
28	FW	COL	Orlando Berrío
29	FW	BRA	Lincoln
37	GK	BRA	César
44	DF	BRA	Rhodolfo

== Hienghène Sport ==
Manager: (French Polynesia) Félix Tagawa

Note: Flags indicate national team as defined under FIFA eligibility rules; some limited exceptions apply. Players may hold more than one non-FIFA nationality.

No.	Pos.	Nation	Player
1	GK	NCL	Rocky Nyikeine
2	DF	NCL	Joris Gorendiawé
3	DF	NCL	William Yentao
4	DF	NCL	Bruno Hyanem
5	DF	NCL	Jordan Dinet
6	MF	NCL	Cédric Sansot
7	FW	NCL	Antony Kaï
8	MF	NCL	Geordy Gony
9	FW	NCL	Brice Dahité
10	MF	NCL	Miguel Kayara
11	FW	NCL	Bertrand Kaï (captain)
12	FW	NCL	Antoine Roine

No.	Pos.	Nation	Player
13	DF	NCL	Roy Kayara
16	MF	JPN	Kohei Matsumoto
18	MF	NCL	Kevin Tein
19	MF	NCL	Joseph Athale
20	MF	BRA	Marcos Paulo
22	MF	POR	Pedro Vilela
27	DF	NCL	Emile Béaruné
28	FW	NCL	Franck Sinem
30	FW	NCL	Yvanoe Bamy
31	GK	NCL	Christopher Yeiwene
34	GK	NCL	Jacques Nyikeine

== Liverpool ==
Liverpool initially named Dejan Lovren and Rhian Brewster in their squad, but they were subsequently not named in the contingent that travelled to Qatar. They subsequently added Ki-Jana Hoever and Sepp van den Berg to their squad, who flew out alongside Harvey Elliott following Liverpool's EFL League Cup quarter-final on 17 December.

Manager: (Germany) Jürgen Klopp

Note: Flags indicate national team as defined under FIFA eligibility rules; some limited exceptions apply. Players may hold more than one non-FIFA nationality.

No.	Pos.	Nation	Player
1	GK	BRA	Alisson
4	DF	NED	Virgil van Dijk
5	MF	NED	Georginio Wijnaldum
7	MF	ENG	James Milner
8	MF	GUI	Naby Keïta
9	FW	BRA	Roberto Firmino
10	FW	SEN	Sadio Mané
11	FW	EGY	Mohamed Salah
12	DF	ENG	Joe Gomez
13	GK	ESP	Adrián
14	MF	ENG	Jordan Henderson (captain)
15	MF	ENG	Alex Oxlade-Chamberlain

No.	Pos.	Nation	Player
20	MF	ENG	Adam Lallana
22	GK	ENG	Andy Lonergan
23	MF	SUI	Xherdan Shaqiri
26	DF	SCO	Andrew Robertson
27	FW	BEL	Divock Origi
48	MF	ENG	Curtis Jones
51	DF	NED	Ki-Jana Hoever
66	DF	ENG	Trent Alexander-Arnold
67	MF	ENG	Harvey Elliott
72	DF	NED	Sepp van den Berg
76	DF	WAL	Neco Williams

== Monterrey ==
On 13 December 2019, William Mejía replaced the injured Vincent Janssen.

Manager: (Argentina) Antonio Mohamed

Note: Flags indicate national team as defined under FIFA eligibility rules; some limited exceptions apply. Players may hold more than one non-FIFA nationality.

No.	Pos.	Nation	Player
1	GK	ARG	Marcelo Barovero
3	DF	MEX	César Montes
4	DF	ARG	Nicolás Sánchez
6	DF	MEX	Edson Gutiérrez
7	FW	ARG	Rogelio Funes Mori
8	FW	COL	Dorlan Pabón
10	FW	URU	Jonathan Urretaviscaya
11	DF	ARG	Leonel Vangioni
14	FW	MEX	Ángel Zaldívar
15	DF	ARG	José María Basanta (captain)
16	MF	PAR	Celso Ortiz
17	MF	MEX	Jesús Gallardo

No.	Pos.	Nation	Player
19	DF	MEX	Miguel Layún
20	MF	MEX	Rodolfo Pizarro
21	MF	MEX	Alfonso González
22	GK	MEX	Luis Cárdenas
23	DF	MEX	Johan Vásquez
24	GK	MEX	Édson Reséndez
25	MF	MEX	Jonathan González
29	MF	MEX	Carlos Rodríguez
32	MF	ARG	Maximiliano Meza
33	DF	COL	Stefan Medina
94	MF	MEX	William Mejía
