= List of Espérance Sportive de Tunis seasons =

Espérance Sportive de Tunis is a Tunisian professional football club based in Tunis. The club was formed in Bab Souika in 1919 as Espérance sportive de Tunis, and played their first competitive match in 1919, when they entered the 1919–20 .

The club has won a total of 70 major trophies, including 34 national championships, 17 Tunisian Cups, 8 Tunisian Super Cups, 4 CAF Champions Leagues, 1 CAF Cup Winners' Cup, 1 CAF Cup, 1 CAF Super Cup, 1 Afro-Asian Cup, 3 UAFA Club Cups.

This is a list of the seasons played by Espérance Sportive de Tunis from 1957 when the club first entered a league competition to the most recent seasons. The club's achievements in all major national and international competitions as well as the top scorers are listed. Top scorers in bold were also top scorers of Ligue 1. The list is separated into three parts, coinciding with the three major episodes of Tunisian football:

== Seasons overview ==
Season	League									Cup	Other	Africa		Top goalscorer(s)	
Season	Division	Pos	Pts	P	W	D	L	GF	GA	Cup	Other	Africa		Name	Goals
1957–58	1	2nd	67	28	16	7	5	57	35	QF				Mohamed Salah Nahali	13
1958–59	1	**1st**	66	26	18	4	4	63	25	RU				**Abdelmajid Tlemçani**	32
1959–60	1	**1st**	65	24	19	3	2	65	23	R32				**Abdelmajid Tlemçani**	22
1960–61	1	2nd	51	20	14	3	3	48	14	SF	**W**			Abdelmajid Tlemçani	12
1961–62	1	**3rd**	55	22	12	9	1	35	14	SF				**Chedly Laaouini**	16
1962–63	1	10th	41	22	7	5	10	36	32	R32				Rached Meddeb	8
1963–64	1	2nd	51	22	10	9	3	32	15	**W**				Abdeljabar Machouche	8
1964–65	1	6th	44	22	7	8	7	21	21	R16					
1965–66	1	5th	47	22	9	7	6	18	14	R16					
1966–67	1	7th	45	22	8	7	7	33	23	QF					
1967–68	1	7th	42	22	6	8	8	23	23	R32				Abdeljabar Machouche	9
1968–69	1	6th	52	26	8	10	8	28	28	RU					
1969–70	1	**1st**	63	26	14	9	3	31	13	R16				Belghith	9
1970–71	1	8th	52	24	14	3	4	33	10	RU	RU	Cup of Champions Clubs	R2	Abdeljabar Machouche	9
1971–72	1	9th	49	26	7	9	10	24	20	SF					
1972–73	1	**3rd**	60	26	13	8	5	35	18	SF					
1973–74	1	2nd	60	26	11	12	3	38	22	SF					
1974–75	1	**1st**	64	26	16	6	4	44	18	R16				**Zoubeir Boughnia**	24
1975–76	1	**1st**	62	26	14	8	4	36	20	RU				Témime Lahzami	12
1976–77	1	7th	54	26	9	10	7	46	34	R16				Abdelmajid Gobantini	11
1977–78	1	6th	53	26	10	7	9	34	33	**W**				Tarak Dhiab	13
1978–79	1	4th	59	26	12	9	5	38	24	**W**					
1979–80	1	2nd	60	26	9	16	1	32	16	**W**	RU	Cup Winners' Cup	R2		
1980–81	1	**3rd**	61	26	16	3	7	39	21	SF		Cup Winners' Cup	R1		
1981–82	1	**1st**	64	26	14	10	2	42	12	R16				**Riadh Fahem**	13
1982–83	1	**3rd**	60	26	12	10	4	40	16	QF					
1983–84	1	5th	58	26	12	8	6	28	15	QF					
1984–85	1	**1st**	64	26	15	8	3	32	15	R32					
1985–86	1	2nd	57	26	9	13	4	30	17	**W**	RU	Cup of Champions Clubs	QF		
1986–87	1	**3rd**	73	26	12	11	3	35	16	SF	RU			Bassem Jeridi	10
1987–88	1	**1st**	81	26	15	10	1	48	13	R32		Cup Winners' Cup	RU	**Nabil Maâloul**	14
1988–89	1	**1st**	85	26	18	5	3	46	19	**W**		Cup of Champions Clubs	R2		
1989–90	1	2nd	83	26	16	9	1	44	11	R16		Cup of Champions Clubs	QF		
1990–91	1	**1st**	82	26	16	8	2	31	13	**W**					
1991–92	1	**3rd**	67	26	11	8	7	28	17	R16					
1992–93	1	**1st**	43	26	18	7	1	43	15	SF				**Kenneth Malitoli**	18
1993–94	1	**1st**	43	26	19	5	2	52	12	SF	**W**			**Kenneth Malitoli**	14
1994–95	1	2nd	37	26	16	5	5	52	23	SF		Cup of Champions Clubs	**W**		
1994–95	1	2nd	37	26	16	5	5	52	23	SF		CAF Super Cup	**W**		
1995–96	1	**3rd**	52	26	15	7	4	36	21	SF		Cup of Champions Clubs	QF		
1995–96	1	**3rd**	52	26	15	7	4	36	21	SF		Afro-Asian Club Championship	**W**		
1996–97	1	2nd	61	26	18	7	1	53	15	**W**		CAF Cup	**W**	**Sami Laaroussi**	14
1997–98	1	**1st**	69	26	22	3	1	63	10	SF		Cup Winners' Cup	**W**	**Ziad Tlemçani**	15
1998–99	1	**1st**	38	14	11	3	0	31	8	**W**		Champions League	RU		
1998–99	1	**1st**	38	14	11	3	0	31	8	**W**		CAF Super Cup	RU		
1999–2000	1	**1st**	60	22	19	3	0	53	7	SF		Champions League	RU	**Ali Zitouni**	19
2000–01	1	**1st**	57	22	18	3	1	38	8	SF		Champions League	SF		
2001–02	1	**1st**	46	22	13	7	2	40	19		**W**	Champions League	Grp	**Kandia Traoré**	13
2002–03	1	**1st**	57	22	18	3	1	47	17	SF		Champions League	Grp		
2003–04	1	**1st**	53	22	17	2	3	38	13	RU		Champions League	SF		
2003–04	1	**1st**	53	22	17	2	3	38	13	RU		Arab Champions League	Grp		
2004–05	1	4th	55	26	15	10	1	43	15	RU		Champions League	Grp		
2005–06	1	**1st**	56	26	17	5	4	42	21	**W**				**Amine Ltifi**	16
2006–07	1	**3rd**	49	26	13	10	3	40	26	**W**		Champions League	Grp		
2007–08	1	**3rd**	49	26	14	4	8	36	18	**W**					
2008–09	1	**1st**	60	26	18	6	2	50	21	S		Arab Champions League	**W**	**Michael Eneramo**	18
2009–10	1	**1st**	54	26	16	6	4	56	24	R16		Champions League	RU	**Michael Eneramo**	13
2010–11	1	**1st**	64	26	20	4	2	50	18	**W**		Champions League	**W**	Oussama Darragi	20
2011–12	1	**1st**	69	30	22	3	5	61	22	SF		CAF Super Cup	RU	Yannick N'Djeng	20
2011–12	1	**1st**	69	30	22	3	5	61	22	SF		FIFA Club World Cup	6th	Yannick N'Djeng	20
2011–12	1	**1st**	69	30	22	3	5	61	22	SF		Champions League	RU	Yannick N'Djeng	20
2012–13	1	2nd	41	20	13	2	5	35	18			Champions League	SF	**Haythem Jouini**	8
2013–14	1	**1st**	66	30	19	9	2	48	15	QF		Champions League	Grp	Ahmed Akaichi	15
2014–15	1	**3rd**	60	30	17	9	4	52	21	QF		Champions League	R2	Ahmed Akaichi	14
2015–16	1	2nd	72	30	23	3	4	60	21	**W**		Confederation Cup	PR	Taha Yassine Khenissi	15
2016–17	1	**1st**	55	24	16	7	1	37	8	SF		Champions League	QF	**Taha Yassine Khenissi**	24
2017–18	1	**1st**	58	26	17	7	2	46	19	R32		Champions League	**W**	Taha Yassine Khenissi	11
2017–18	1	**1st**	58	26	17	7	2	46	19	R32		Arab Club Champions Cup	**W**	Taha Yassine Khenissi	11
2018–19	1	**1st**	56	26	17	5	4	37	15	SF	**W**	Champions League	**W**	**Taha Yassine Khenissi**	14
2018–19	1	**1st**	56	26	17	5	4	37	15	SF	**W**	Arab Club Champions Cup	R1	**Taha Yassine Khenissi**	14
2018–19	1	**1st**	56	26	17	5	4	37	15	SF	**W**	CAF Super Cup	RU	**Taha Yassine Khenissi**	14
2018–19	1	**1st**	56	26	17	5	4	37	15	SF	**W**	FIFA Club World Cup	5th	**Taha Yassine Khenissi**	14
2019–20	1	**1st**	62	26	18	8	0	41	12	RU	**W**	Champions League	QF	Anice Badri	10
2019–20	1	**1st**	62	26	18	8	0	41	12	RU	**W**	Arab Club Champions Cup	R2	Anice Badri	10
2019–20	1	**1st**	62	26	18	8	0	41	12	RU	**W**	CAF Super Cup	RU	Anice Badri	10
2019–20	1	**1st**	62	26	18	8	0	41	12	RU	**W**	FIFA Club World Cup	5th	Anice Badri	10
2020–21	1	**1st**	60	26	19	3	4	37	16	R32	RU	Champions League	SF	Mohamed Ali Ben Romdhane	10
2021–22	1	**1st**	51	24	14	6	4	36	14	R16	**W**	Champions League	QF	**Mohamed Ali Ben Hammouda**	11
2022–23	1	2nd	55	28	16	7	5	45	18	RU	—	Champions League	SF	Mohamed Ali Ben Romdhane	14
2023–24	1	**1st**	53	22	16	5	1	33	12	R32	—	Champions League	RU	**Rodrigo Rodrigues**	11
2023–24	1	**1st**	53	22	16	5	1	33	12	R32	—	African Football League	SF	**Rodrigo Rodrigues**	11
2023–24	1	**1st**	53	22	16	5	1	33	12	R32	—	Arab Club Champions Cup	Grp	**Rodrigo Rodrigues**	11
2024–25	1	**1st**	66	30	19	9	2	57	22	**W**	**W**	Champions League	QF	Youcef Belaïli	20
2024–25	1	**1st**	66	30	19	9	2	57	22	**W**	**W**	FIFA Club World Cup	GS	Youcef Belaïli	20
2025–26	1	2nd	63	30	18	9	3	45	11	**W**	**W**	Champions League	SF	Kouceila Boualia	11

== Key ==
Key to league record:

- P = Played
- W = Games won
- D = Games drawn
- L = Games lost
- GF = Goals for
- GA = Goals against
- Pts = Points
- Pos = Final position

Key to divisions:

- 1 = Ligue 1

Key to rounds:

- DNE = Did not enter
- Grp = Group stage
- R1 = First Round
- R2 = Second Round
- PR = Playoff Round
- R32 = Round of 32
- R16 = Round of 16
- QF = Quarter-finals
- SF = Semi-finals
- RU = Runners-up
- W = Winners

Champions	Runners-up	Promoted	Relegated

Division shown in bold to indicate a change in division.
Top scorers shown in bold are players who were also top scorers in their division that season.

== Honours ==
As of the 2025–26 season, Espérance Sportive de Tunis have won a total of 70 titles (regional competitions not considered), of which 59 were achieved domestically and 11 in international competitions. The club's most recent honour is the 2024–25 Tunisian Ligue Professionnelle 1.

=== National ===
Competition	Titles	Winning years or seasons
Tunisian Ligue Professionnelle 1	34	1941–42, (Note: Title won before Tunisian independence) 1958–59, 1959–60, 1969–70, 1974–75, 1975–76, 1981–82, 1984–85, 1987–88, 1988–89, 1990–91, 1992–93, 1993–94, 1997–98, 1998–99, 1999–2000, 2000–01, 2001–02, 2002–03, 2003–04, 2005–06, 2008–09, 2009–10, 2010–11, 2011–12, 2013–14, 2016–17, 2017–18, 2018–19, 2019–20, 2020–21, 2021–22, 2023–24, 2024–25
Tunisian Cup	17	1938–39, 1956–57, 1963–64, 1978–79, 1979–80, 1985–86, 1988–89, 1990–91, 1996–97, 1998–99, 2005–06, 2006–07, 2007–08, 2010–11, 2015–16, 2024–25, 2025–26
Tunisian Super Cup	8	1960, 1993, 2001, 2018, 2019, 2021, 2024, 2025

=== African ===
Competition	Titles	Winning years or seasons
CAF Champions League	4	1994, 2011, 2018, 2019
CAF Cup Winners' Cup	1	1998
CAF Cup	1	1997
Afro-Asian Cup	1	1995
CAF Super Cup	1	1995

=== Regional ===
Competition	Titles	Winning years or seasons
UAFA Club Cup	3	1993, 2009, 2017
Arab Super Cup	1	1996
North African Cup Winners Cup	1	2008

=== Doubles and trebles ===
- Doubles: (1988–89, 1990–91, 1998–99, 2005–06, 2010–11, 2024–25)
- Trebles: (2010–11)

== Footnotes ==
- **^{A}** Figures include goals in League, Cup, League Cup, African competitions, and the Super Cup.
