= 2020 CAF Super Cup =

2020 Total CAF Super Cup
Espérance de Tunis	Zamalek
(Tunisia)	(Egypt)
1	3
- Date: 14 February 2020
- Venue: Thani bin Jassim Stadium, Doha, Qatar
- Man of the Match: Achraf Bencharki (Zamalek)
- Referee: Victor Gomes (South Africa)
- Attendance: 19,398
- Weather: Mostly clear 20 °C (68 °F); 56% humidity

The 2020 CAF Super Cup (officially the 2020 Total CAF Super Cup for sponsorship reasons) was the 28th CAF Super Cup, an annual football match in Africa organized by the Confederation of African Football (CAF), between the winners of the previous season's two CAF club competitions, the CAF Champions League and the CAF Confederation Cup.

The match was played between Espérance de Tunis from Tunisia, the 2018–19 CAF Champions League winners, and Zamalek from Egypt, the 2018–19 CAF Confederation Cup winners, at the Thani bin Jassim Stadium in Doha, Qatar on 14 February 2020.

This season was the first to be played according to the new calendar, as per the decision of the CAF Executive Committee on 20 July 2017. The match was initially scheduled on 16, 17 or 18 August 2019, but was postponed. The CAF announced on 21 November 2019 that the match would be played on 14 February 2020 in Doha, Qatar.

The match was played in the Middle Eastern country for the second consecutive season, after signing a three-year agreement with the CAF the previous season. Zamalek announced in November 2019 that they would not play the match in Qatar due to the Qatar diplomatic crisis. However, the club's board voted in February 2020 to play in the match.

Zamalek won the match 3–1, winning their fourth CAF Super Cup title.

== Teams ==
Team	Zone	Qualification	Previous participation (bold indicates winners)
(Tunisia) Espérance de Tunis	UNAF (North Africa)	2018–19 CAF Champions League winners	4 (**1995**, 1999, 2012, 2019)
(Egypt) Zamalek	UNAF (North Africa)	2018–19 CAF Confederation Cup winners	4 (**1994**, **1997**, 2001, **2003**)

== Venue ==
The match was played at Thani bin Jassim Stadium in Doha, Qatar. The stadium has a capacity of 21,175 and is the home venue of Qatar Stars League side Al Gharafa. It was one of the five venues that hosted the 2011 AFC Asian Cup in the country.

City	Stadium	Location of the host city of the 2020 CAF Super Cup.
Doha	Thani bin Jassim Stadium	Location of the host city of the 2020 CAF Super Cup.
**Capacity: 21,175**		Location of the host city of the 2020 CAF Super Cup.

== Format ==
The CAF Super Cup is played as a single match at a neutral venue, with the CAF Champions League winners designated as the "home" team for administrative purposes. If the score is tied at the end of regulation, extra time will not be played, and the penalty shoot-out will be used to determine the winner (CAF Champions League Regulations XXVII and CAF Confederation Cup Regulations XXV).

== Background ==
The match was the fourth CAF Super Cup to feature an Egyptian and a Tunisian team, with all previous three matches ending in favor of the Egyptian side. Espérance de Tunis qualified to the match after their controversial win against Wydad Casablanca in the 2019 CAF Champions League Final, where they were declared champions after the second leg was abandoned. Zamalek earned a place in the match after defeating RS Berkane in the 2019 CAF Confederation Cup Final 5–3 on penalties after being tied 1–1 on aggregate.

This was the seventh meeting between both teams in African competition. All of their previous six encounters were in the Champions League, including the 1994 final which was won by Espérance de Tunis where they grabbed their only victory against Zamalek in the second leg. The rest of the meetings resulted in two wins for Zamalek, including an away win in 2005, and three draws between the two teams.

== Pre-match ==
Nine days before the match, the 2019–20 CAF Champions League knockout stage draw was held at the Hilton Pyramids Golf in Cairo, Egypt and resulted in Zamalek being drawn against Espérance de Tunis; meaning that both teams would face each other three times in three weeks.

Prior to their league game against US Tataouine, Espérance de Tunis announced that defender Abdelkader Bedrane has suffered from a torn ligament and would be sidelined for at least three weeks, missing the CAF Super Cup as a result.

Zamalek captain Mahmoud Shikabala suffered from an injury during training with the club in January 2020 and was still in the recovery stage. He was included by Patrice Carteron in the club's traveling squad to Qatar, but did not appear in the starting eleven or on the bench.

== Match ==
=== Officials ===
On 10 February 2020, CAF named South African referee Victor Gomes as the referee for the match. Gomes is considered one of Africa's finest referees and consistently appeared in all CAF major competitions since 2013. His compatriot Zakhele Siwela was chosen as one of the assistant referees, along with Mosotho official Souru Phatsoane, while Maguette N'Diaye of Senegal was chosen as the fourth official. Zambian referee Janny Sikazwe was named the video assistant referee and was assisted by Mustapha Ghorbal from Algeria and Gerson Emiliano dos Santos from Angola.

=== Details ===
14 February 2020
16:00 GMT
(19:00 UTC+3)

Espérance de Tunis (Tunisia)	1–3	(Egypt) Zamalek
Benguit 54' (pen.)	Report (Soccerway)	Obama 2'; Bencharki 58', 90+5'

Thani bin Jassim Stadium, Doha (Qatar)
Attendance: 19,398
Referee: Victor Gomes (South Africa)

**Espérance de Tunis**	**Zamalek**

GK	1	(Tunisia) Moez Ben Cherifia
LB	23	(Algeria) Ilyes Chetti
CB	6	(Tunisia) Mohamed Ali Yacoubi
CB	12	(Tunisia) Khalil Chemmam (c)
RB	22	(Tunisia) Sameh Derbali
CM	3	(Ghana) Kwame Bonsu		(substituted off) 60'
CM	15	(Ivory Coast) Fousseny Coulibaly	(yellow card) 45'
AM	18	(Algeria) Raouf Benguit
LW	10	(Libya) Hamdou Elhouni
RW	7	(Algeria) Billel Bensaha		(substituted off) 69'
CF	9	(Ivory Coast) Ibrahim Ouattara		(substituted off) 77'
Substitutes:
GK	19	(Tunisia) Rami Jridi
DF	5	(Tunisia) Chamseddine Dhaouadi
DF	24	(Tunisia) Iheb Mbarki
MF	25	(Tunisia) Fedi Ben Choug		(substituted on) 77'
FW	27	(Tunisia) Mohamed Ali Ben Romdhane
FW	2	(Tunisia) Mohamed Ali Ben Hammouda		(substituted on) 69'
FW	11	(Tunisia) Taha Yassine Khenissi		(substituted on) 60'
Manager:
(Tunisia) Moïne Chaâbani

GK	1	(Egypt) Mohamed Abou Gabal
LB	19	(Egypt) Mohamed Abdel Shafy
CB	4	(Egypt) Mahmoud Alaa
CB	28	(Egypt) Mahmoud Hamdy	(yellow card) 51'
RB	7	(Egypt) Hazem Emam (c)	(yellow card) 88'	(substituted off) 88'
CM	3	(Egypt) Tarek Hamed	(yellow card) 83'
CM	13	(Tunisia) Ferjani Sassi
AM	11	(Egypt) Youssef Obama
LW	20	(Morocco) Achraf Bencharki	(yellow card) 63'
RW	25	(Egypt) Ahmed Sayed		(substituted off) 82'
CF	15	(Egypt) Mostafa Mohamed		(substituted off) 90+1'
Substitutes:
GK	21	(Egypt) Mohamed Awad
DF	5	(Egypt) Mohamed Abdel Ghani		(substituted on) 88'
DF	22	(Egypt) Abdallah Gomaa		(substituted on) 82'
MF	24	(Egypt) Mohamed Hassan
FW	2	(Democratic Republic of the Congo) Kabongo Kasongo
FW	28	(Morocco) Mohamed Ounajem		(substituted on) 90+1'
FW	30	(Egypt) Mostafa Fathi
Manager:
(France) Patrice Carteron

Man of the Match:
Achraf Bencharki (Zamalek)

Assistant referees:
Zakhele Siwela (South Africa)
Souru Phatsoane (Lesotho)
Fourth official:
Maguette N'Diaye (Senegal)
Video assistant referee:
Janny Sikazwe (Zambia)
Assistant video assistant referees:
Mustapha Ghorbal (Algeria)
Gerson Emiliano dos Santos (Angola)

**Match rules**

- 90 minutes.
- Penalty shoot-out if scores level.
- Seven named substitutes, of which up to three may be used.

== See also ==
- 2020 CAF Champions League final
- 2020 CAF Confederation Cup final
