= Abderrahmane Meziane =

Algerian footballer (born 1994)

Personal information
- Full name: Abderrahmane Meziane Bentahar
- Date of birth: March 7, 1994 (age 32)
- Place of birth: Médéa, Algeria
- Height: 1.68 m (5 ft 6 in)
- Position: Striker

Team information
- Current team: CR Belouizdad
- Number: 11

Youth career
- 2007–2009: Olympique de Médéa
- 2009–2011: AC FAF
- 2011–2014: USM Alger

Senior career*
Years	Team	Apps	(Gls)
2013–2019	USM Alger	74	(18)
2015–2016	→ RC Arbaâ (loan)	25	(2)
2019	Al Ain	4	(1)
2020–2021	ES Tunis	25	(1)
2021–2023	USM Alger	43	(7)
2023–	CR Belouizdad	81	(13)

International career^{‡}
2014–2016	Algeria U23	16	(4)
2017–2023	Algeria A'	3	(1)
2018	Algeria	1	(0)
- * Club domestic league appearances and goals as of 5 June 2026 ‡ National team caps and goals as of 6 June 2025

Abderrahmane Meziane Bentahar (Arabic: عبد الرحمان مزيان) (born March 7, 1994) is an Algerian footballer who plays as a striker for CR Belouizdad in the Algerian Ligue Professionnelle 1.

== Club career ==
=== USM Alger ===
In 2011 Abderrahmane Meziane joined the USM Alger Academy, coming from the FAF Academy. Where Meziane achieved with them two titles for the Ligue Professionnelle 1 U21 season 2012–13 and 2013–14 and one in the cup with U17 in 2011 against USM Blida and scored a goal in a match. the first official game with the first team was in the 2013-14 season in the Ligue Professionnelle 1 against JSM Béjaïa and participated in just one minute as a substitute in the place of Mokhtar Benmoussa, In the following season, Meziane was promoted to the first team and played eight games and scored a single goal against JS Saoura in the Ligue ProfessionnelMezianele 1. On July 8, 2015, Meziane moved on loan for one season to RC Arbaâ in order to get a chance to play more, and he greatly excelled, which made him return to USM Alger strongly, and in the first season after his return Meziane won his first title in his football career by winning the Super Cup. As for the Ligue Professionnelle 1 Meziane was the second best scorer with eight goals equal with Oussama Darfalou. On June 21, 2017, Meziane scored his first goal in The CAF Champions League against Zamalek in 2–0 victory. In his last season Meziane won the Ligue Professionnelle 1 title for the first time and in the final round against CS Constantine where he scored a goal in 3–1 victory to guarantee the title. On August 21, 2021, Abderrahmane Meziane came back again and signed a two-year contract with USM Alger and after great negotiations about the salary, they agreed for 260 million per month. On June 3, 2023, Meziane won the first international title in his football career by winning the 2022–23 CAF Confederation Cup after defeating Young Africans of Tanzania.

=== The first foreign experiment ===
On June 13, 2019, Meziane signed his first foreign contract for four seasons with the Emiratis of Al Ain. and his first match was in the UAE League Cup against Shabab Al Ahli which ended in a 2–2 draw. after which Meziane suffered a knee injury that kept him out for more than a month. On December 15, Meziane scored his first goal against Ajman in 4–1 victory. On January 18, 2020, Meziane signed for three and a half seasons in Espérance de Tunis for a million and a half dollars. and the first match was in the Ligue 1 against CS Hammam-Lif, after a stop for five months due to the COVID-19 pandemic in Tunisia football competitions are back again, On August 22, 2020, Meziane scored his first goal against Stade Tunisien to end the season with two titles the Ligue Professionnelle 1 and the Super Cup. In the second season it was expected that Meziane would have exploded all his capabilities, but due to injuries and the coach's lack of confidence in him, Espérance de Tunis administration decided to offer him for sale, but no club submitted to contract with him and at the end of the season Meziane was officially dismissed.

=== CR Belouizdad ===
In August 2023, he joined CR Belouizdad.

== International career ==
In 2015, Meziane was part of the Algeria under-23 national team at the 2015 U-23 Africa Cup of Nations in Senegal. where he participated in all matches and lead the National team to the Football at the 2016 Summer Olympics for the first time in 36 years, Meziane was named in the squad for the 2016 Summer Olympics. In the first match against Honduras, he took part as a substitute for Mohamed Benkablia, and in the following matches against Argentina he participated as a substitute again, and this time in the place of Zakaria Haddouche, in the last game against Portugal and after the national team was eliminated, Meziane participated in the entire 90 minutes. in 2017 Meziane calls for the first time for the Algeria A' national team in the 2018 CHAN qualification against Libya. On January 2, 2023, Meziane was selected for the 28-man squad to participate in the 2022 African Nations Championship. Where did Meziane play five matches, all of which participated in as a starter and reached the final, where they lost the title against Senegal.

== Career statistics ==
=== Club ===
As of 10 July 2023

Club	Season	League			Cup		Other		Continental		Total	
Club	Season	Division	Apps	Goals	Apps	Goals	Apps	Goals	Apps	Goals	Apps	Goals
USM Alger	2013–14	Algerian Ligue 1	1	0	—		—		—		1	0
USM Alger	2014–15	Algerian Ligue 1	5	1	2	0	—		1 (Note: All appearance(s) in CAF Champions League)	0	8	1
USM Alger	2016–17	Algerian Ligue 1	26	8	3	0	1 (Note: Appearance in Super Cup)	0	5	0	35	8
USM Alger	2017–18	Algerian Ligue 1	18	2	2	0	—		10 (Note: seven appearances and one goal in CAF Champions League, three appearances and one goal in CAF Confederation Cup)	2	30	4
USM Alger	2018–19	Algerian Ligue 1	24	7	3	0	3 (Note: All appearance(s) in Arab Club Champions Cup)	0	6 (Note: All appearance(s) in CAF Confederation Cup)	1	36	8
USM Alger	2021–22	Algerian Ligue 1	21	5	—		—		—		21	5
USM Alger	2022–23	Algerian Ligue 1	22	3	—		—		11	3	33	6
USM Alger	Total		117	26	10	0	4	0	33	6	164	32
→ RC Arbaâ (loan)	2015–16	Ligue 1	25	2	3	0	—		—		28	2
Al Ain FC	2019–20	UAE Pro-League	4	1	—		2 (Note: All appearance(s) in UAE League Cup)	0	—		6	0
Espérance ST	2019–20	Tunisian Ligue 1	10	1	2	0	—		2	0	14	1
Espérance ST	2020–21	Tunisian Ligue 1	15	0	0	0	—		3	0	18	0
Espérance ST	Total		25	1	2	0	—		5	0	32	1
Career total			138	22	15	0	6	0	33	3	191	25

== Honours ==
USM Alger

- Algerian Ligue Professionnelle 1: 2018–19
- Algerian Super Cup: 2016
- CAF Confederation Cup: 2022–23

Espérance de Tunis

- Tunisian Ligue Professionnelle 1: 2019–20, 2020–21
- Tunisian Super Cup: 2020
