= 2018–19 Tunisian Super Cup =

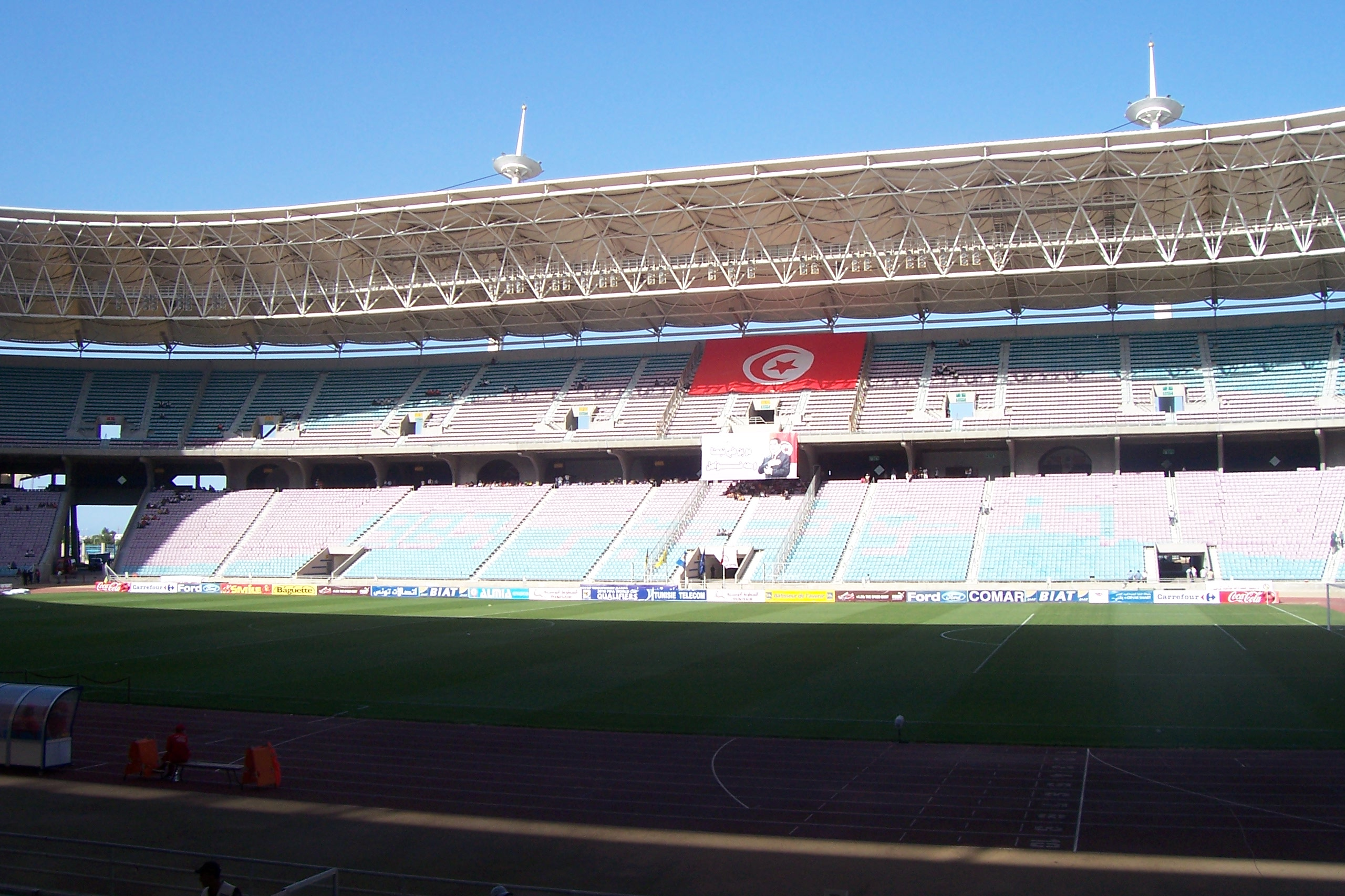
- Stade Hammadi Agrebi hosted the match
Espérance de Tunis	Club Sfaxien
Ligue 1	Tunisian Cup
0	0
- Espérance de Tunis won 5–4 on penalties
- Date: 20 September 2020
- Venue: Stade Hammadi Agrebi, Tunis
- Man of the Match: Aymen Dahmen (Club Sfaxien)
- Referee: Naim Hosni
- Attendance: 0
- Weather: Cloudy overall 27 °C (81 °F); 60% humidity

The 2018–19 Tunisian Super Cup was the 15th edition of the Tunisian Super Cup, a football match contested by the winners of the 2018–19 Tunisian Ligue Professionnelle 1 and 2018–19 Tunisian Cup competitions. The match was played on September 20, 2020 at Stade Hammadi Agrebi in Tunis. between 2018–19 Ligue 1 winners Espérance de Tunis and 2018–19 Tunisian Cup winners Club Sfaxien.

== Match ==
=== Pre-match ===
On February 10, 2019, the Tunisian Football Federation decided to fix the match date to March 15, 2020. However, the match was postponed to September 20, 2020, due to the COVID-19 pandemic in Tunisia. And which will be led by international referee Naim Hosni. The match will be broadcast live on the Télévision Tunisienne 1 and on Al-Kass Sports.

=== Venue ===
Hammadi Agrebi Stadium, formerly known as 7 November Stadium is a multi-purpose stadium in Radès, Tunis, Tunisia about 10 kilometers south-east of the city center of Tunis, in the center of the Olympic City. It is currently used mostly for football matches and it also has facilities for athletics. The stadium holds 60,000 and was built in 2001 for the 2001 Mediterranean Games and is considered to be one of the best stadiums in Africa.

== Match details ==
20 September 2020
18:00

Espérance de Tunis	0–0	Club Sfaxien
	Report
Penalties
Yacoubi (penalty scored); Benguit (penalty scored); Khenissi (penalty scored); Mimouni (penalty scored); Elhouni (penalty missed); Bedrane (penalty scored)	5–4	(penalty scored) Habbassi; (penalty scored) Harzi; (penalty scored) Amamou; (penalty scored) Jouini; (penalty missed) Amri; (penalty missed) Bakir

Stade Hammadi Agrebi, Tunis
Attendance: 0
Referee: Naim Hosni

GK	1	(Tunisia) Moez Ben Cherifia		(substituted off) 90'
CB	12	(Tunisia) Khalil Chemmam		(substituted off) 21'
LB	23	(Algeria) Ilyes Chetti
RB	22	(Tunisia) Sameh Derbali	(yellow card) 45+1'
CB	6	(Tunisia) Mohamed Ali Yacoubi
DM	15	(Ivory Coast) Fousseny Coulibaly
DM	3	(Ghana) Kwame Bonsu		(substituted off) 90'
DM	18	(Algeria) Raouf Benguit
LW	17	(Libya) Hamdou Elhouni
LW	7	(Algeria) Billel Bensaha		(substituted off) 80'
FW	11	(Tunisia) Taha Yassine Khenissi
Substitutes :
FW	2	(Tunisia) Mohamed Ali Ben Hammouda		(substituted on) 80'
DF	8	(Tunisia) Farouk Mimouni		(substituted on) 90'
FW	9	(Ivory Coast) Ibrahim Ouattara
FW	16	(Tunisia) Zied Berrima
GK	19	(Tunisia) Rami Jridi		(substituted on) 90'
MF	25	(Tunisia) Fedi Ben Choug
MF	28	(Tunisia) Mohamed Amine Meskini
MF	29	(Tunisia) Youssef Mosrati
CB	30	(Algeria) Abdelkader Bedrane		(substituted on) 21'
Manager :
(Tunisia) Mouin Chaâbani

GK	30	(Tunisia) Aymen Dahmen
DF	2	(Tunisia) Mohamed Ben Ali
DF	28	(Tunisia) Mohamed Ali Jouini	(yellow card) 47'
DF	3	(Tunisia) Hani Amamou
MF	23	(Tunisia) Hamza Jelassi
MF	6	(Tunisia) Mohamed Ali Trabelsi	(yellow card) 63'
MF	20	(Nigeria) Kingsley Sokari
MF	5	(Mali) Ibrahima Tandia		(substituted off) 64'
MF	29	(Tunisia) Achraf Habbassi
MF	10	(Tunisia) Aymen Harzi
FW	14	(Algeria) Zakaria Benchaâ		(substituted off) 64'
Substitutes :
GK	1	(Tunisia) Mohamed Hedi Gaaloul
DF	21	(Tunisia) Houssem Dagdoug
DF	4	(Tunisia) Nour Zamen Zammouri
DF	19	(Tunisia) Azmi Ghouma
MF	32	(Algeria) Rachid Aït-Atmane
MF	13	(Algeria) Mohamed Islam Bakir		(substituted on) 64'
FW	31	(Nigeria) Kingsley Eduwo		(substituted on) 64' (substituted off) 90+3'
MF	24	(Tunisia) Abdallah Amri
MF	15	(Tunisia) Walid Karoui		(substituted on) 90+3'
Manager :
(Tunisia) Faouzi Benzarti

Man of the Match:

Aymen Dahmen (Club Sfaxien)

Assistant referees:
Faouzi Jrid
Walid Harag
Fourth official:
Mokhtar Dabbous

Match rules

- 90 minutes.
- Penalty shoot-out if scores level.
- Seven named substitutes, of which up to five may be used.

== Broadcasting ==
Country/Region	Broadcaster
Tunisia	El Watania 1
Middle East and North Africa	Alkass Sports

== See also ==
- 2018–19 Tunisian Ligue Professionnelle 1
- 2018–19 Tunisian Cup
