= 2019 FIFA Club World Cup =

2019 edition of the FIFA Club World Cup

FIFA Club World Cup Qatar 2019 presented by Alibaba Cloud كأس العالم للأندية لكرة القدم قطر 2019

Tournament details
- Host country: Qatar
- Dates: 11–21 December
- Teams: 7 (from 6 confederations)
- Venues: 2 (in 1 host city)

Final positions
- Champions: (England) Liverpool (1st title)
- Runners-up: (Brazil) Flamengo
- Third place: (Mexico) Monterrey
- Fourth place: (Saudi Arabia) Al-Hilal

Tournament statistics
- Matches played: 8
- Goals scored: 30 (3.75 per match)
- Attendance: 166,426 (20,803 per match)
- Top scorer(s): (Algeria) Baghdad Bounedjah (Libya) Hamdou Elhouni (3 goals each)
- Best player: (Egypt) Mohamed Salah
- Fair play award: (Tunisia) Espérance de Tunis

The 2019 FIFA Club World Cup (officially known as the FIFA Club World Cup Qatar 2019 presented by Alibaba Cloud for sponsorship reasons) was the 16th edition of the FIFA Club World Cup, a FIFA-organised international club football tournament between the winners of the six continental confederations, as well as the host nation's league champions. The tournament was hosted by Qatar between 11 and 21 December 2019, taking place at two venues in the city of Al Rayyan.

Real Madrid, winners of the last three Club World Cup titles, were unable to defend their title, having been eliminated in the round of 16 of the 2018–19 UEFA Champions League. The eventual winners of that competition, Liverpool, went on to win the Club World Cup for the first time, beating Mexican side Monterrey 2–1 in the semi-finals, before requiring extra time to claim a 1–0 win over Flamengo in the final.

== Host appointment ==
With proposals for an expanded Club World Cup, FIFA delayed the announcement of a host. A host was to be announced by FIFA on 15 March 2019, though this was later delayed. On 28 May 2019, FIFA announced that the 2019 and 2020 tournament host would be appointed at the FIFA Council meeting in Paris, France, on 3 June 2019.

Qatar was appointed as the host for the 2019 and 2020 tournaments on 3 June 2019, serving as test events ahead of their hosting of the 2022 FIFA World Cup. The Club World Cup retained its original format ahead of the expected revamp in 2021, but due to the COVID-19 pandemic the expansion only took place in 2025.

== Qualified teams ==
Location of the teams participating in the 2019 FIFA Club World Cup.

Team	Confederation	Qualification	Qualified date	Participation
Entering in the semi-finals
(Brazil) Flamengo	CONMEBOL	Winners of the 2019 Copa Libertadores	23 November 2019	Debut
(England) Liverpool	UEFA	Winners of the 2018–19 UEFA Champions League	1 June 2019	2nd (Previous: 2005)
Entering in the second round
(Saudi Arabia) Al-Hilal	AFC	Winners of the 2019 AFC Champions League	24 November 2019	Debut
(Tunisia) Espérance de Tunis	CAF	Winners of the 2018–19 CAF Champions League	7 August 2019 (Note: The second leg of the final was played on 31 May 2019. However, the match was abandoned and Espérance de Tunis were initially declared champions by the referee. However, on 5 June 2019 the CAF Executive Committee ordered the match to be replayed, until a decision by CAS on 31 July 2019 ordered the decision to be taken by the CAF Disciplinary Board, who on 7 August 2019 restored the title to Espérance de Tunis.)	3rd (Previous: 2011, 2018)
(Mexico) Monterrey	CONCACAF	Winners of the 2019 CONCACAF Champions League	1 May 2019	4th (Previous: 2011, 2012, 2013)
Entering in the first round
(New Caledonia) Hienghène Sport	OFC	Winners of the 2019 OFC Champions League	11 May 2019	Debut
(Qatar) Al-Sadd	AFC (host)	Winners of the 2018–19 Qatar Stars League	13 August 2019 (Note: Al-Sadd won the 2018–19 Qatar Stars League on 4 April 2019. Their participation in the 2019 FIFA Club World Cup was officially confirmed on 13 August 2019 after Al-Duhail became the last team from Qatar other than Al-Sadd to be eliminated from the 2019 AFC Champions League. Al-Sadd themselves were eliminated from the 2019 AFC Champions League on 22 October 2019, confirming their first round entrance.)	2nd (Previous: 2011)

== Venues ==
The tournament was held in the city of Al Rayyan, at Jassim bin Hamad Stadium and Khalifa International Stadium, which previously hosted matches at the 2011 AFC Asian Cup, including the final for the latter. A third venue in Al Rayyan, Education City Stadium, was also originally planned to host matches during the tournament, including the final. In December 2019, FIFA moved all three matches (the second semi-final on 18 December and the third place match and final on 21 December) that were due to be played at the Education City Stadium to Khalifa International Stadium after the opening of the Education City Stadium was postponed to early 2020.

Al Rayyan (Doha Area)		Location of the host city of the 2019 FIFA Club World Cup.
Jassim bin Hamad Stadium	Khalifa International Stadium	Location of the host city of the 2019 FIFA Club World Cup.
Capacity: 15,000	Capacity: 45,857	Location of the host city of the 2019 FIFA Club World Cup.

== Match officials ==
Five referees, ten assistant referees, and six video assistant referees were appointed for the tournament.

Confederation	Referee	Assistant referees	Video assistant referee
AFC	(Qatar) Abdulrahman Al-Jassim	(Qatar) Taleb Al-Marri (Qatar) Saoud Al-Maqaleh	(China) Fu Ming
CAF	(Algeria) Mustapha Ghorbal	(Egypt) Mahmoud Abouelregal (Algeria) Mokrane Gourari	(The Gambia) Bakary Gassama
CONCACAF	(United States) Ismail Elfath	(United States) Kyle Atkins (United States) Corey Parker	(Republic of Ireland) Alan Kelly
CONMEBOL	(Chile) Roberto Tobar	(Chile) Christian Schiemann (Chile) Claudio Ríos Ortiz	(Uruguay) Esteban Ostojich
UEFA	(Romania) Ovidiu Hațegan	(Romania) Octavian Șovre (Romania) Sebastian Gheorghe	(Spain) Juan Martínez Munuera (France) Benoît Millot

One support referee was also named for the tournament.

Confederation	Support referee
OFC	(French Polynesia) Abdelkader Zitouni

== Squads ==
Each team had to name a 23-man squad (three of whom must be goalkeepers). Injury replacements were allowed until 24 hours before the team's first match.

== Matches ==
The draw of the tournament was held on 16 September 2019, 14:00 CEST (UTC+2), at the FIFA headquarters in Zürich, to decide the matchups of the second round (between the first round winner and teams from AFC, CAF, and CONCACAF), and the opponents of the two second round winners in the semi-finals (against teams from CONMEBOL and UEFA). At the time of the draw, the identity of the teams from AFC and CONMEBOL were not known.

If a match was tied after normal playing time:

- For elimination matches, extra time was played. If still tied after extra time, a penalty shoot-out was held to determine the winner.
- For the matches for fifth place and third place, no extra time was played, and a penalty shoot-out was held to determine the winner.

First round
11 December – Al Rayyan (JBHS)
(Qatar) Al-Sadd (a.e.t.)	3
(New Caledonia) Hienghène Sport	1

Second round
14 December – Al Rayyan (JBHS)
(Mexico) Monterrey	3
(Qatar) Al-Sadd	2
14 December – Al Rayyan (JBHS)
(Saudi Arabia) Al-Hilal	1
(Tunisia) Espérance de Tunis	0

Semi-finals
18 December – Al Rayyan (KIS)
(Mexico) Monterrey	1
(England) Liverpool	2
17 December – Al Rayyan (KIS)
(Brazil) Flamengo	3
(Saudi Arabia) Al-Hilal	1
Match for fifth place
17 December – Al Rayyan (KIS)
(Qatar) Al-Sadd	2
(Tunisia) Espérance de Tunis	6

Final
21 December – Al Rayyan (KIS)
(England) Liverpool (a.e.t.)	1
(Brazil) Flamengo	0
Match for third place
21 December – Al Rayyan (KIS)
(Mexico) Monterrey (p)	2 (4)
(Saudi Arabia) Al-Hilal	2 (3)

All times are local, AST (UTC+3).

=== First round ===
11 December 2019
20:30

Al-Sadd (Qatar)	3–1 (a.e.t.)	(New Caledonia) Hienghène Sport
Bounedjah 26'; Hassan 100'; Ró-Ró 114'	Report	Roïné 46'

Jassim bin Hamad Stadium, Al Rayyan
Attendance: 7,047
Referee: Mustapha Ghorbal (Algeria)

=== Second round ===
14 December 2019
17:00

Al-Hilal (Saudi Arabia)	1–0	(Tunisia) Espérance de Tunis
Gomis 73'	Report

Jassim bin Hamad Stadium, Al Rayyan
Attendance: 7,726
Referee: Roberto Tobar (Chile)

14 December 2019
20:30

Monterrey (Mexico)	3–2	(Qatar) Al-Sadd
Vangioni 23'; Funes Mori 45+1'; Rodríguez 77'	Report	Bounedjah 66'; Hassan 89'

Jassim bin Hamad Stadium, Al Rayyan
Attendance: 4,878
Referee: Ovidiu Hațegan (Romania)

=== Match for fifth place ===
17 December 2019
17:30

Al-Sadd (Qatar)	2–6	(Tunisia) Espérance de Tunis
Bounedjah 32' (pen.); Al-Haydos 49' (pen.)	Report	Elhouni 6', 42', 74'; Badri 13', 25' (pen.); Derbali 87'

Khalifa International Stadium, Al Rayyan
Attendance: 15,037
Referee: Abdelkader Zitouni (Tahiti)

=== Semi-finals ===
17 December 2019
20:30

Flamengo (Brazil)	3–1	(Saudi Arabia) Al-Hilal
De Arrascaeta 49'; Bruno Henrique 78'; Al-Bulaihi 82' (o.g.)	Report	Al-Dawsari 18'

Khalifa International Stadium, Al Rayyan
Attendance: 21,588
Referee: Ismail Elfath (United States)

18 December 2019
20:30

Monterrey (Mexico)	1–2	(England) Liverpool
Funes Mori 14'	Report	Keïta 12'; Firmino 90+1'

Khalifa International Stadium, Al Rayyan
Attendance: 45,416
Referee: Roberto Tobar (Chile)

=== Match for third place ===
21 December 2019
17:30

Monterrey (Mexico)	2–2	(Saudi Arabia) Al-Hilal
A. González 55'; Meza 60'	Report	Carlos Eduardo 35'; Gomis 66'
Penalties
J. González (penalty scored); Medina (penalty scored); Funes Mori (penalty scored); Vásquez (penalty missed); Cárdenas (penalty scored)	4–3	(penalty scored) Gomis; (penalty scored) Giovinco; (penalty missed) Carlos Eduardo; (penalty scored) Jang Hyun-soo; (penalty missed) Kanno

Khalifa International Stadium, Al Rayyan
Attendance: 19,318
Referee: Ovidiu Hațegan (Romania)

=== Final ===
21 December 2019
20:30

Liverpool (England)	1–0 (a.e.t.)	(Brazil) Flamengo
Firmino 99'	Report

Khalifa International Stadium, Al Rayyan
Attendance: 45,416
Referee: Abdulrahman Al-Jassim (Qatar)

== Goalscorers ==
Rank	Player	Team	Goals
1	(Algeria) Baghdad Bounedjah	(Qatar) Al-Sadd	3
1	(Libya) Hamdou Elhouni	(Tunisia) Espérance de Tunis	3
3	(Tunisia) Anice Badri	(Tunisia) Espérance de Tunis	2
3	(Brazil) Roberto Firmino	(England) Liverpool	2
3	(Argentina) Rogelio Funes Mori	(Mexico) Monterrey	2
3	(France) Bafétimbi Gomis	(Saudi Arabia) Al-Hilal	2
3	(Qatar) Abdelkarim Hassan	(Qatar) Al-Sadd	2
8	(Brazil) Bruno Henrique	(Brazil) Flamengo	1
8	(Brazil) Carlos Eduardo	(Saudi Arabia) Al-Hilal	1
8	(Saudi Arabia) Salem Al-Dawsari	(Saudi Arabia) Al-Hilal	1
8	(Uruguay) Giorgian De Arrascaeta	(Brazil) Flamengo	1
8	(Tunisia) Sameh Derbali	(Tunisia) Espérance de Tunis	1
8	(Mexico) Alfonso González	(Mexico) Monterrey	1
8	(Qatar) Hassan Al-Haydos	(Qatar) Al-Sadd	1
8	(Guinea) Naby Keïta	(England) Liverpool	1
8	(Argentina) Maximiliano Meza	(Mexico) Monterrey	1
8	(Mexico) Carlos Rodríguez	(Mexico) Monterrey	1
8	(New Caledonia) Antoine Roïné	(New Caledonia) Hienghène Sport	1
8	(Qatar) Ró-Ró	(Qatar) Al-Sadd	1
8	(Argentina) Leonel Vangioni	(Mexico) Monterrey	1

1 own goal

- (Saudi Arabia) Ali Al-Bulaihi (Al-Hilal, against Flamengo)

== Final ranking ==
Per statistical convention in football, matches decided in extra time were counted as wins and losses, while matches decided by penalty shoot-out were counted as draws.

Pos	Team	Pld	W	D	L	GF	GA	GD	Pts
1st place, gold medalist(s)	(England) Liverpool (UEFA)	2	2	0	0	3	1	+2	6
2nd place, silver medalist(s)	(Brazil) Flamengo (CONMEBOL)	2	1	0	1	3	2	+1	3
3rd place, bronze medalist(s)	(Mexico) Monterrey (CONCACAF)	3	1	1	1	6	6	0	4
4	(Saudi Arabia) Al-Hilal (AFC)	3	1	1	1	4	5	−1	4
5	(Tunisia) Espérance de Tunis (CAF)	2	1	0	1	6	3	+3	3
6	(Qatar) Al-Sadd (AFC) (H)	3	1	0	2	7	10	−3	3
7	(New Caledonia) Hienghène Sport (OFC)	1	0	0	1	1	3	−2	0

Source: FIFA
(H) Hosts

== Awards ==
The following awards were given at the conclusion of the tournament. Mohamed Salah of Liverpool won the Golden Ball award, sponsored by Adidas, which is jointly awarded with the Alibaba Cloud Award to recognise the player of the tournament.

Adidas Golden Ball Alibaba Cloud Award	Adidas Silver Ball	Adidas Bronze Ball
(Egypt) Mohamed Salah (Liverpool)	(Brazil) Bruno Henrique (Flamengo)	(Brazil) Carlos Eduardo (Al-Hilal)
FIFA Fair Play Award
(Tunisia) Espérance de Tunis

FIFA also named a man of the match for the best player in each game at the tournament.

Alibaba Cloud Match Award
Match	Man of the match	Club	Opponent
1	(Algeria) Baghdad Bounedjah	(Qatar) Al-Sadd	(New Caledonia) Hienghène Sport
2	(Mexico) Rodolfo Pizarro	(Mexico) Monterrey	(Qatar) Al-Sadd
3	(Peru) André Carrillo	(Saudi Arabia) Al-Hilal	(Tunisia) Espérance de Tunis
4	(Libya) Hamdou Elhouni	(Tunisia) Espérance de Tunis	(Qatar) Al-Sadd
5	(Brazil) Bruno Henrique	(Brazil) Flamengo	(Saudi Arabia) Al-Hilal
6	(Egypt) Mohamed Salah	(England) Liverpool	(Mexico) Monterrey
7	(Mexico) Luis Cárdenas	(Mexico) Monterrey	(Saudi Arabia) Al-Hilal
8	(Brazil) Roberto Firmino	(England) Liverpool	(Brazil) Flamengo

== Criticism ==
In 2017, three member countries of the Gulf Cooperation Council along with Egypt cut diplomatic ties with Qatar and criminalised trips for their citizens to the country. In October, FIFA sold 200 Club World Cup tickets to fans from Saudi Arabia and Bahrain, and 500 to those from the United Arab Emirates and Egypt. In November 2019, Human Rights Watch (HRW) criticised FIFA for neglecting fan welfare and selling tickets for the Club World Cup to those banned by their governments. HRW stated that FIFA should be aware of the risks that the football supporters can face in their countries and ensure that they are not exposed to the risk of harassment or prosecution.

On 5 November 2019, Liverpool Chief Executive Peter Moore assured that the Qatari authorities had permitted LGBT football fans to attend the FIFA Club World Cup matches in December 2019.
