= Billel Bensaha =

Algerian footballer (born 1994)

Personal information
- Full name: Billel Bensaha
- Date of birth: 18 February 1994 (age 32)
- Place of birth: Zeralda, Algeria
- Height: 1.70 m (5 ft 7 in)
- Position: Winger

Team information
- Current team: CR Témouchent
- Number: 7

Youth career
- 2013–2015: JSM Béjaïa

Senior career*
Years	Team	Apps	(Gls)
2015–2018	JSM Béjaïa	4	(1)
2018–2019	DRB Tadjenanet	32	(8)
2019–2021	ES Tunis	16	(1)
2020–2021	→ MC Alger (loan)	25	(2)
2021–2022	JS Kabylie	33	(1)
2023	Al-Sharq	13	(4)
2023–2025	Al-Nahda		
2025–2026	USM El Harrach		
2026–	CR Témouchent	0	(0)
- * Club domestic league appearances and goals as of 29 July 2026

Billel Bensaha (Arabic: بلال بن ساحة; born 18 February 1994) is an Algerian footballer who plays as a winger for CR Témouchent.

== Career ==
In 2019, he signed a contract with ES Tunis. In 2020, he signed a loan contract with MC Alger. In 2021, he joined JS Kabylie. In 2023, he joined Saudi club Al-Sharq. In 2023, he joined Omani club Al-Nahda.On 14 January 2025, he returned to Algeria signing with USM El Harrach. On 29 July 2026, he joined CR Témouchent.

== Honours ==
Espérance de Tunis

- Tunisian Ligue Professionnelle 1: 2019–20
- Tunisian Super Cup: 2020
- Tunisian Cup runner-up: 2019–20
- CAF Super Cup runner-up: 2020
