= Moez Ben Cherifia =

Tunisian footballer

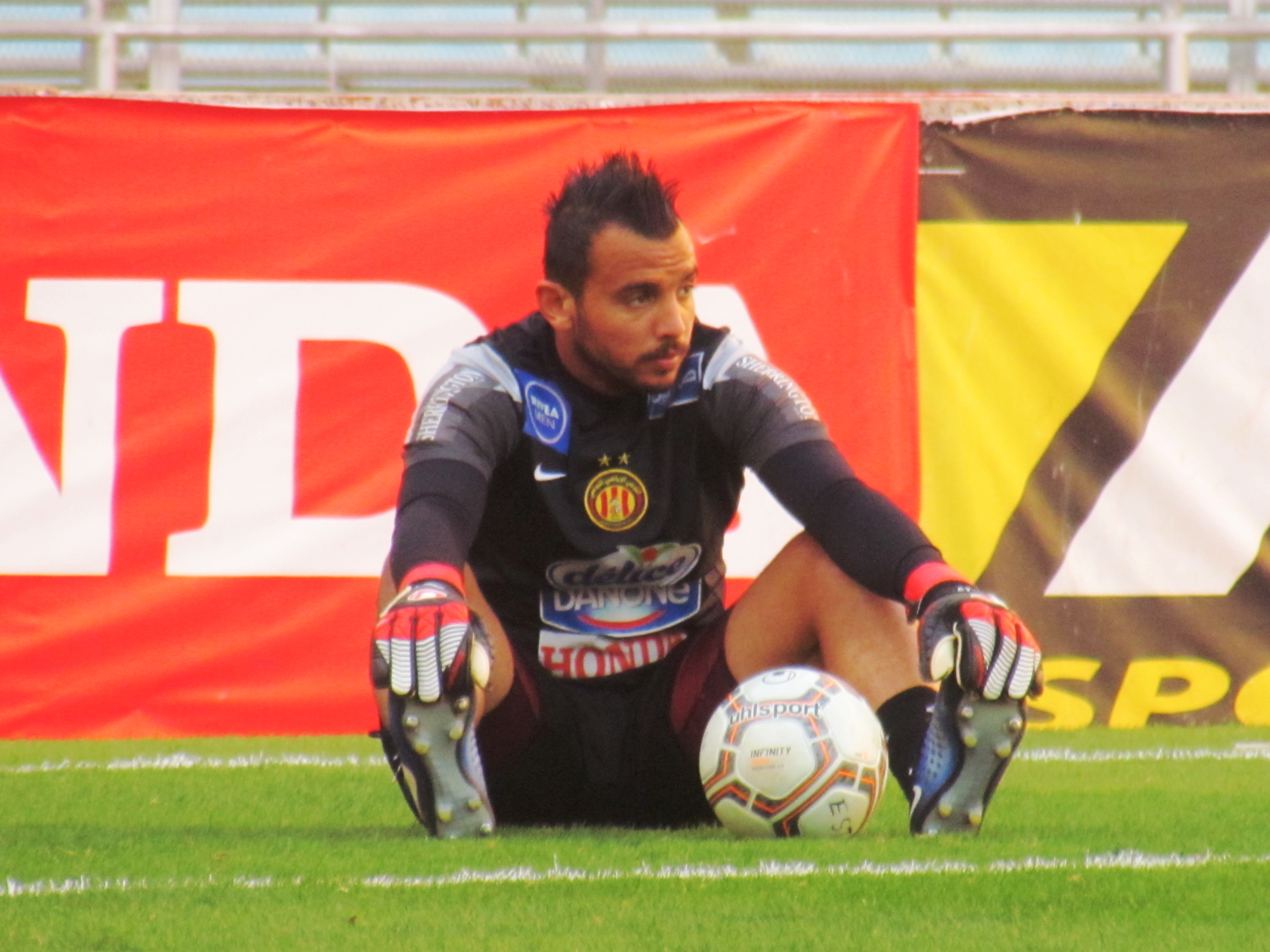
- Moez with Espérance de Tunis in 2017

Personal information
- Full name: Moez Ben Cherifia
- Date of birth: 24 June 1991 (age 35)
- Place of birth: Tunis, Tunisia
- Height: 1.82 m (6 ft 0 in)
- Position: Goalkeeper

Team information
- Current team: CS Hammam-Lif
- Number: 40

Senior career*
Years	Team	Apps	(Gls)
2009–2024	Espérance de Tunis	389	(0)
2024–2025	Olympique Béja	12	(0)
2025–2026	AS Soliman	28	(0)
2026–	CS Hammam-Lif	3	(0)

International career^{‡}
2012–2024	Tunisia	22	(0)
- * Club domestic league appearances and goals as of 23 September 2026 ‡ National team caps and goals as of 9 October 2020

Moez Ben Cherifia (Arabic: مُعِزّ بْن شَرِيفِيَّة) (born 24 June 1991) is a Tunisian professional footballer who plays as a goalkeeper for Tunisian Ligue Professionnelle 2 club CS Hammam-Lif.

== International career ==
In May 2018, Moez was named in Tunisia’s preliminary 29-man squad for the 2018 World Cup in Russia but did not make the final 23-man squad.

== Career statistics ==
=== International ===
As of matches played on 9 October 2020

Tunisia national team
Year	Apps	Goals
2012	2	0
2013	11	0
2014	0	0
2015	4	0
2016	0	0
2017	1	0
2018	0	0
2019	3	0
2020	1	0
Total	22	0

== Honours ==
Espérance de Tunis

- Tunisian Ligue Professionnelle 1: 2009–10, 2010–11, 2011–12, 2013–14, 2016–17, 2017–18, 2018–19, 2019–20, 2020–21, 2021–22, 2023–24
- Tunisian Cup: 2010–11, 2015–16
- CAF Champions League: 2011, 2018, 2018–19
- Arab Club Champions Cup: 2017
- Tunisian Super Cup: 2018, 2019, 2021
