= Kwame Bonsu =

Ghanaian footballer (born 1994)

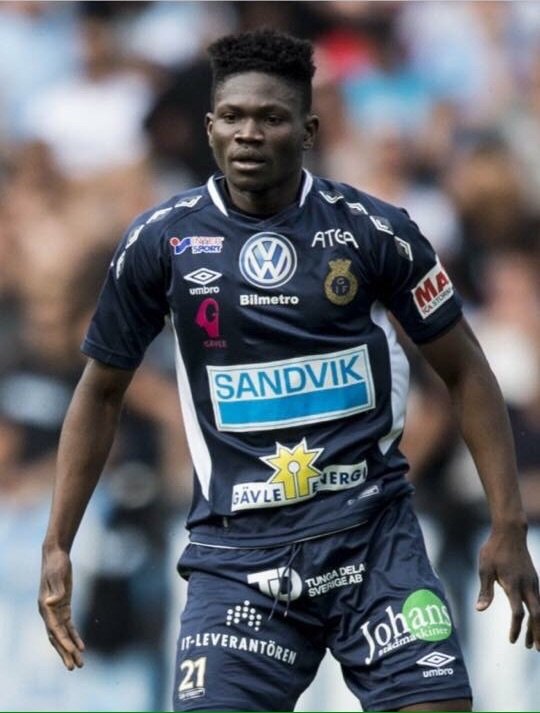
- Bonsu with Gefle IF in 2015

Personal information
- Full name: Kwame Bonsu
- Date of birth: 25 September 1994 (age 32)
- Place of birth: Buduburam, Ghana
- Height: 1.82 m (6 ft 0 in)
- Position: Midfielder

Team information
- Current team: Al-Shabab

Youth career
- Anokye Stars
- Heart of Lions

Senior career*
Years	Team	Apps	(Gls)
2012–2013	Heart of Lions	22	(4)
2013	→ FC Rosengård (loan)	8	(2)
2014–2015	Mjällby AIF	39	(2)
2015–2017	Gefle IF	42	(0)
2018–2019	Asante Kotoko	16	(1)
2019–2020	Espérance ST	24	(3)
2020–2022	Ceramica Cleopatra	45	(1)
2023	Al Bataeh	10	(0)
2024	Naft Al-Basra	22	(1)
2024–2025	Al-Ain	31	(0)
2025–2026	Al-Jandal	22	(1)
2026–	Al-Shabab	0	(0)

International career^{‡}
2019–	Ghana	1	(0)
- * Club domestic league appearances and goals as of 21:42, 27 November 2019 (UTC) ‡ National team caps and goals as of 26 March 2019

Kwame Bonsu (born 25 September 1994) is a Ghanaian footballer who plays as a midfielder for Omani club Al-Shabab. He has had previous spells in Sweden with Gefle IF, Mjällby AIF, Rosengård and for Asante Kotoko in his home country Ghana.

== Club career ==
=== Youth career (Heart of Lions) ===
At the age of 17 Bonsu got a contract to play for the Ghanaian premier league team Heart of Lions in the 2012/13 season By the end of the season he had played 22 games and scored 4 goals for the Ghanaian premier club.

=== Career in Sweden ===
In 2013 whilst playing for Heart of Lions based in Kpando, Kwame secured a loan deal to play in Sweden for Malmo team FC Rosengard. He played eight league matches and scored two goals for Rosengård, both goals scored on 7 September 2013 in a 2–1 win over Hässleholms IF.

His performances for Heart of Lions secured him a permanent contract to play for Mjallby AIF in the 2014/15 season. Bonsu played a total of 39 matches, scoring two goals for Mjällby AIF. He then signed a three-year contract with Gefle IF in July 2015 after leaving Mjällby AIF.

He played 42 league matches between 2015 and 2017 .

=== Asante Kotoko ===
The former IF Gafle midfielder moved back to Ghana to join Asante Kotoko in October 2018.

He played a key role in the team's impressive run in the CAF Confederation Cup as they progressed to the group stages of the cup for the first time in 11 years. He also helped the club to win the Normalization Committee Tier one cup.

=== Espérance Sportive de Tunis ===
Due to his performance for Asante Kotoko in the CAF Confederation 2019 Competition, he secured a move to Tunisian League giants Espérance Sportive de Tunis July 2019.

He played in 15 matches out of 26 matches, of which he started 14 matches as Espérance ST won the 2019–20 Tunisian Ligue

=== Saudi Arabia ===
On 24 August 2024, Bonsu joined Saudi Arabian club Al-Ain.

On 21 August 2025, Bonsu joined Al-Jandal.

== International ==
Bonsu made his debut for the Ghana national football team on 26 March 2019 in a friendly against Mauritania.

== Honours ==
=== Club ===
Espérance de Tunis

- Tunisian Ligue Professionnelle 1 (1): 2019–20
- Tunisian Super Cup (1): 2020
