= Mohamed Ali Yacoubi =

Tunisian footballer

Personal information
- Full name: Mohamed Ali Yacoubi
- Date of birth: 5 October 1990 (age 36)
- Place of birth: Kairouan, Tunisia
- Height: 1.92 m (6 ft 4 in)
- Position: Centre-back

Senior career*
Years	Team	Apps	(Gls)
2010–2011	Jeunesse Kairouanaise	17	(3)
2011–2014	Club Africain	56	(6)
2014–2016	Espérance de Tunis	37	(3)
2016–2017	Çaykur Rizespor	14	(1)
2017–2018	Al-Fateh	7	(0)
2018	Quevilly-Rouen	1	(0)
2018–2023	Espérance de Tunis	52	(3)

International career^{‡}
2014–	Tunisia	14	(1)
- * Club domestic league appearances and goals as of 30 June 2023 ‡ National team caps and goals as of 1 January 2022

Mohamed Ali Yacoubi (Arabic: محمد علي اليعقوبي) (born 5 October 1990) is a Tunisian professional footballer who plays as a defender.

== Honours ==
Club Africain

- CAF Confederation Cup runner-up: 2011

Espérance de Tunis

- CAF Champions League: 2018, 2019
- Tunisian Ligue Professionnelle 1: 2018–19, 2019–20, 2020–21, 2021–22
- Tunisian Super Cup: 2018, 2019, 2021
