= Aymen Harzi =

Tunisian footballer

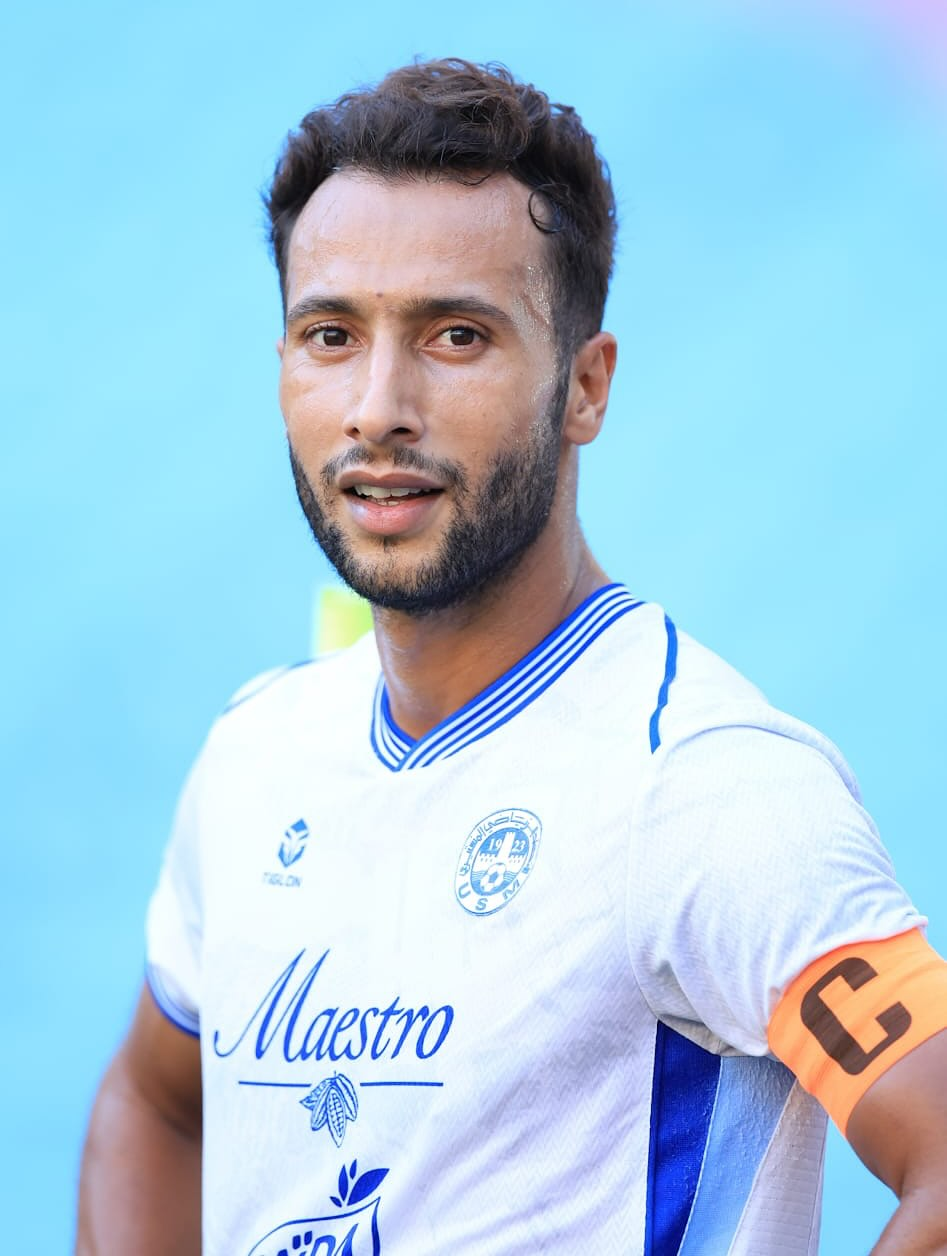
- Harzi in 2025.

Personal information
- Date of birth: 1 March 1995 (age 31)
- Place of birth: Kairouan, Tunisia
- Height: 1.74 m (5 ft 9 in)
- Position: Attacking midfielder

Team information
- Current team: Club Africain

Senior career*
Years	Team	Apps	(Gls)
2015–2017	JS Kairouan	56	(8)
2017–2022	CS Sfaxien	136	(26)
2022–2024	Al-Khaldiya	1	(0)
2024	Al-Riffa	2	(0)
2024–2026	US Monastir	53	(8)
2026–	Club Africain	2	
- * Club domestic league appearances and goals ‡ National team caps and goals as of 20 February 2026

Aymen Harzi (born 1 March 1995; Arabic: أيمن الحرزي) is a Tunisian professional football midfielder who currently plays for Club Africain.

== Career ==
Aymen Harzi made his professional debut with JS Kairouan during the 2014-2015 season. After three seasons with the club, he moved to CS Sfaxien in 2017, where he established himself as a pivotal player and secured three Tunisian Cup titles in 2019 and 2021 and 2022. Following stints in Bahrain with Al-Khaldiya SC and Al-Riffa SC, Harzi returned to Tunisia in 2024 to sign with US Monastir.

On 27 January 2026, Aymen Harzi signed with Club Africain, agreeing to a contract that will keep him at the club until June 2028.

== Honours ==
CS Sfaxien

- Tunisian Cup 3

Winners: 2019, 2021, 2022

Al-Khaldiya SC

- Bahraini Super Cup 1
