= 2019–20 Tunisian Ligue Professionnelle 1 =

Tunisian Ligue Professionnelle 1
- Season: 2019–20
- Dates: 24 August 2019 – 13 September 2020
- Champions: Espérance de Tunis (30th title)
- Relegated: Club de Hammam-Lif; Jeunesse Kairouanaise
- Champions League: Espérance de Tunis; Club Sfaxien
- Confederation Cup: Union Monastirienne; Étoile du Sahel
- Matches: 182
- Goals: 390 (2.14 per match)
- Top goalscorer: Anthony Okpotu (13 goals)
- Biggest home win: Espérance de Tunis 7–1 Jeunesse Kairouanaise (31 December 2019)
- Biggest away win: Stade Tunisien 0–4 Union Monastirienne (23 February 2020); Union de Ben Guerdane 0–4 Club Sfaxien (22 August 2020)
- Highest scoring: Espérance de Tunis 7–1 Jeunesse Kairouanaise (31 December 2019)
- Longest winning run: Espérance de Tunis (7 matches)
- Longest unbeaten run: Espérance de Tunis (26 matches)
- Longest winless run: Union de Tataouine (10 matches)
- Longest losing run: Avenir de Soliman; Jeunesse Kairouanaise (6 matches each)

The 2019–20 Tunisian Ligue Professionnelle 1 (Tunisian Professional League) season was the 65th season of top-tier football in Tunisia.

The season was suspended in March 2020, due to COVID-19 pandemic in Tunisia, then resumed in July 2020.

== Teams ==
A total of 14 teams contested the league.

=== Stadiums and locations ===
Locations of the 2019–20 Ligue 1 teams

Team	Location	Stadium	Capacity
Avenir de Soliman	Soliman	Stade municipal de Soliman	3,000
Club Africain	Tunis	Stade Olympique de Radès	60,000
Club Bizertin	Bizerte	Stade 15 Octobre	20,000
Croissant Chebbien	Chebba	Stade de Chebba	3,000
Club de Hammam-Lif	Tunis	Stade Bou Kornine	8,000
Club Sfaxien	Sfax	Stade Taïeb Mhiri	22,000
Étoile de Métlaoui	Métlaoui	Stade Municipal de Métlaoui	5,000
Étoile du Sahel	Sousse	Stade Olympique de Sousse	25,000
Espérance de Tunis	Tunis	Stade Olympique de Radès	60,000
Jeunesse Kairouanaise	Kairouan	Stade Ali Zouaoui	15,000
Stade Tunisien	Tunis	Stade Chedly Zouiten	20,000
Union de Ben Guerdane	Ben Guerdane	Stade du 7 Mars	10,000
Union Monastirienne	Monastir	Stade Mustapha Ben Jannet	20,000
Union de Tataouine	Tataouine	Stade Nejib Khattab	5,000

== League table ==
Pos	Team	Pld	W	D	L	GF	GA	GD	Pts	Qualification or relegation
1	Espérance de Tunis (C)	26	18	8	0	41	12	+29	62	Qualification for Champions League
2	Club Sfaxien	26	15	6	5	33	19	+14	51	Qualification for Champions League
3	Union Monastirienne	26	12	9	5	36	19	+17	45	Qualification for Confederation Cup
4	Étoile du Sahel	26	12	7	7	37	25	+12	43	Qualification for Confederation Cup
5	Club Africain	26	13	7	6	28	14	+14	40 (Note: Club Africain were deducted 6 points.)	
6	Stade Tunisien	26	10	6	10	26	27	−1	36	
7	Union de Ben Guerdane	26	8	10	8	26	31	−5	34	
8	Croissant Chebbien	26	7	9	10	33	33	0	30	Administrtive relegation to Ligue 2
9	Avenir de Soliman	26	8	4	14	29	32	−3	28	
10	Union de Tataouine	26	6	10	10	21	28	−7	28	
11	Étoile de Métlaoui	26	6	7	13	23	34	−11	25	
12	Club Bizertin	26	5	8	13	18	35	−17	23	
13	Club de Hammam-Lif (R)	26	5	7	14	20	40	−20	22	Relegation to Ligue 2
14	Jeunesse Kairouanaise (R)	26	6	4	16	19	41	−22	22	Relegation to Ligue 2

Source: les-sports.info (in French)
Rules for classification: 1) points; 2) head-to-head points; 3) head-to-head goal difference; 4) goal difference; 5) total goals; 6) fairplay ranking; 7) playoff.
(C) Champions; (R) Relegated

== Results ==
Home \ Away	ASS	CA	CAB	CSCH	CSHL	CSS	ESM	ESS	EST	JSK	ST	USBG	USM	UST
Avenir de Soliman		2–0	2–0	4–2	1–2	1–2	1–0	2–0	0–1	2–0	2–0	0–2	1–2	1–1
Club Africain	2–0		2–0	1–0	0–0	1–0	2–1	2–3	0–0	2–0	3–0	1–0	0–1	1–1
Club Bizertin	2–1	0–1		2–0	1–1	1–2	1–1	2–2	0–2	1–0	1–4	0–0	2–1	1–2
Croissant Chebbien	3–3	0–2	0–0		3–0	2–2	2–0	1–2	1–2	4–1	2–0	3–1	2–3	0–0
Club de Hammam-Lif	1–1	0–1	2–1	1–2		2–1	0–0	1–0	0–1	1–2	0–2	1–2	1–1	2–1
Club Sfaxien	1–0	1–0	0–0	2–0	1–0		2–0	2–1	0–2	2–1	1–2	2–0	1–0	1–0
Étoile de Métlaoui	3–1	0–2	0–0	2–1	1–1	0–1		1–0	1–2	2–0	2–1	0–1	2–2	1–0
Étoile du Sahel	1–0	1–1	1–2	0–0	4–0	1–1	5–1		1–1	2–0	2–1	1–0	0–0	2–0
Espérance de Tunis	2–1	2–1	3–1	1–1	2–0	0–0	2–1	1–0		7–1	2–1	4–1	1–0	1–1
Jeunesse Kairouanaise	1–2	1–1	3–0	1–3	2–0	2–3	1–0	1–3	0–0		0–1	0–1	0–0	0–0
Stade Tunisien	1–0	1–0	0–0	0–0	2–0	0–0	1–0	3–1	0–0	0–1		1–1	0–4	2–0
Union de Ben Guerdane	2–1	0–0	2–0	0–0	4–2	0–4	2–2	1–1	0–0	0–1	2–2		0–2	2–2
Union Monastirienne	0–0	0–0	2–0	2–0	3–1	2–1	1–1	1–2	0–1	3–0	1–0	1–1		1–1
Union de Tataouine	1–0	0–2	1–0	1–1	1–1	1–1	3–1	0–1	0–1	1–0	2–1	0–1	1–3	

Source: les-sports.info (in French)
Legend: Blue = home team win; Yellow = draw; Red = away team win.
For upcoming matches, an "a" indicates there is an article about the rivalry between the two participants.

== Positions by round ==
Team ╲ Round	1	2	3	4	5	6	7	8	9	10	11	12	13	14	15	16	17	18	19	20	21	22	23	24	25	26
Avenir de Soliman	2	3	6	7	8	11	11	12	10	12	10	10	8	8	9	8	9	8	8	9	9	9	8	9	9	10
Club Africain	1	1	1	3	3	2	2	2	2	2	2	2	5	5	5	5	5	5	5	5	4	4	4	4	4	5
Club Bizertin	7	12	8	9	10	9	9	9	9	9	9	11	11	12	13	13	13	14	13	13	14	14	13	14	11	12
Croissant Chebbien	9	9	12	8	11	8	8	8	8	8	8	8	9	9	8	9	8	9	9	8	8	8	9	8	8	8
Club de Hammam-Lif	7	9	12	14	9	10	10	10	11	13	13	13	13	10	10	11	12	11	14	14	13	12	14	12	13	14
Club Sfaxien	9	6	4	5	4	4	5	4	4	4	4	4	3	3	2	2	2	2	3	2	2	2	2	2	2	2
Étoile de Métlaoui	12	14	10	11	13	13	12	11	13	11	11	12	12	13	14	14	11	13	11	11	11	10	11	11	12	11
Étoile du Sahel	2	4	7	6	5	6	7	7	6	6	5	6	6	6	6	6	4	4	4	4	5	5	5	5	5	4
Espérance de Tunis	5	2	2	1	1	1	1	1	1	1	1	1	1	1	1	1	1	1	1	1	1	1	1	1	1	1
Jeunesse Kairouanaise	9	6	9	12	12	12	13	13	12	10	12	9	10	11	12	12	14	10	12	12	12	13	12	13	14	13
Stade Tunisien	14	13	14	10	7	7	6	6	7	7	6	5	4	4	4	4	6	6	7	7	7	6	6	6	6	6
Union de Ben Guerdane	5	8	5	4	6	5	4	5	5	5	7	7	7	7	7	7	7	7	6	6	6	7	7	7	7	7
Union Monastirienne	2	4	3	2	2	3	3	3	3	3	3	3	2	2	3	3	3	3	2	3	3	3	3	3	3	3
Union de Tataouine	12	9	11	13	14	14	14	14	14	14	14	14	14	14	11	10	10	12	10	10	10	11	10	10	10	9

Leader
2020–21 CAF Champions League
2020–21 CAF Confederation Cup
Relegation to Ligue Professionnelle 2 2019-20

Source: les-sports.info (in French)

== Clubs season-progress ==
Team ╲ Round	1	2	3	4	5	6	7	8	9	10	11	12	13	14	15	16	17	18	19	20	21	22	23	24	25	26
Avenir de Soliman	W	D	L	L	L	L	L	L	W	L	W	D	W	W	L	W	L	D	L	L	W	L	W	D	L	L
Club Africain	W	W	W	L	W	W	W	W	L	W	D	W	D	L	D	W	D	W	D	D	W	D	L	W	L	L
Club Bizertin	D	L	W	L	L	W	L	L	W	L	D	L	L	L	L	L	D	D	D	D	L	D	W	D	W	L
Croissant Chebbien	L	D	L	W	L	W	W	D	L	L	L	W	L	D	W	L	W	L	L	W	D	D	D	D	D	D
CS Hammam-Lif	D	L	L	L	W	D	L	D	L	L	L	W	L	W	D	L	L	D	L	L	D	W	L	W	D	L
Club Sfaxien	L	W	W	W	W	L	W	W	W	D	L	L	W	W	W	W	D	D	D	W	W	L	W	D	W	D
Étoile de Métlaoui	L	L	W	L	L	L	D	D	L	W	D	L	L	L	L	L	W	L	W	D	D	W	L	D	L	W
Étoile du Sahel	W	D	L	W	W	L	L	W	D	D	W	L	D	D	W	W	W	W	D	D	L	W	L	L	W	W
Espérance de Tunis	W	W	W	W	W	W	W	D	W	W	W	W	W	D	W	W	W	D	D	D	W	D	D	W	W	D
Jeunesse Kairouanaise	L	W	L	L	L	L	L	L	W	W	L	W	L	L	L	L	L	W	D	L	D	L	W	D	L	D
Stade Tunisien	L	D	L	W	W	W	W	D	L	D	W	W	W	W	L	L	L	L	L	D	L	W	D	D	L	W
Union de Ben Guerdane	W	L	W	W	L	W	W	L	D	D	D	L	L	W	W	D	D	D	W	W	L	L	D	L	D	D
Union Monastirienne	W	D	W	W	W	D	D	W	W	W	L	D	W	L	L	W	D	W	W	D	D	D	L	L	W	D
Union de Tataouine	L	D	L	L	L	L	L	D	L	L	W	L	W	D	W	D	D	L	W	D	D	D	W	D	D	W

Source: les-sports.info (in French)
W = Win; D = Draw; L = Lose

== Season statistics ==
=== Top scorers ===
Rank	Goalscorer	Club	Goals
1	(Nigeria) Anthony Okpotu	Union Monastirienne	13
2	(Burkina Faso) Bassirou Compaoré	Club Africain	8
3	(Tunisia) Mohamed Ali Amri	Union Monastirienne	7
3	(Tunisia) Rached Arfaoui	Avenir de Soliman	7
5	(Tunisia) Anice Badri	Espérance de Tunis	6
5	(Republic of the Congo) Guy Mbenza	Stade Tunisien	6

=== Top assists ===
Rank	Player	Club	Assists
1	(Tunisia) Elyes Jelassi	Union Monastirienne	8
2	(Algeria) Billel Bensaha	Espérance de Tunis	7
3	(Tunisia) Mohamed Mkaari	Union Monastirienne	5
3	(Tunisia) Haykeul Chikhaoui	Stade Tunisien	5
3	(Tunisia) Wissem Ben Yahia	Club Africain	5
3	(Tunisia) Aymen Harzi	Club Sfaxien	5
4	(Tunisia) Zouheir Dhaouadi	Club Africain	4
5	(Burkina Faso) Bassirou Compaoré	Club Africain	3
5	(Libya) Hamdou Elhouni	Espérance de Tunis	3

=== Hat-tricks ===
Player	For	Against	Result	Date	Ref
(Republic of the Congo) Guy Mbenza	Stade Tunisien	Étoile du Sahel	3–1	15 December 2019	
(Tunisia) Firas Ben Larbi	Étoile du Sahel	Étoile de Métlaoui	5–1	22 February 2020	

== Media coverage ==
Tunisian Ligue Professionnelle 1 Media Coverage
Country	Television Channel	Matches
Tunisia	El Wataniya 1 El Wataniya 2	From 2 to 5 Matches per round
Qatar	Al-Kass Sports Channel	Main Matches

== See also ==
- 2019–20 Tunisian Ligue Professionnelle 2
- 2019–20 Tunisian Cup
