= Hamdou Elhouni =

Libyan footballer (born 1994)

Personal information
- Full name: Hamdou Mohamed Elhouni
- Date of birth: 12 February 1994 (age 32)
- Place of birth: Tripoli, Libya
- Height: 1.69 m (5 ft 7 in)
- Position: Left winger

Team information
- Current team: Al-Ahli SC (Tripoli)
- Number: 10

Senior career*
Years	Team	Apps	(Gls)
2013–2015	Al-Ahli SC (Tripoli)		
2015	Vitória Setúbal		
2016	Santa Clara	13	(3)
2016–2018	Benfica	0	(0)
2016–2018	→ Chaves (loan)	24	(1)
2018–2019	Aves	20	(1)
2019–2023	Espérance de Tunis	76	(13)
2023–2024	Wydad AC	14	(0)
2024–	Al-Ahli SC (Tripoli)	37	(15)

International career^{‡}
2014–	Libya	46	(5)
- * Club domestic league appearances and goals as of 10 June 2026 ‡ National team caps and goals as of 12 November 2026

Hamdou Mohamed Elhouni (Arabic: حمدو محمد الهوني, born 12 February 1994) is a Libyan professional footballer who plays as a left winger for Al-Ahli SC (Tripoli) and the Libya national team.

He has previously played for Primeira Liga club's Victória Setúbal, Santa Clara, Benfica, Chaves, Desportivo das Aves and Espérance de Tunis.

== Career statistics ==
=== Club ===
As of match played on 3 May 2023

Appearances and goals by club, season and competition
Club	Season	League			Cup		Continental		Other		Total	
Club	Season	Division	Apps	Goals	Apps	Goals	Apps	Goals	Apps	Goals	Apps	Goals
EST	2018–19	TLP1	8	3	1	0	7 (Note: Appearances in CAF Confederation Cup)	0	2 (Note: 1 Appearance in CAF Super Cup,1 Appearance in Tunisian Super Cup)	0	18	3
EST	2019–20	TLP1	17	5	5	1	9	1	8 (Note: 1 Appearance in CAF Super Cup, 2 Appearances in FIFA Club World Cup, 1 Appearance in Tunisian Super Cup, 4 Appearance in Arab Club Champions Cup)	4 (Note: 3 Goals in FIFA Club World Cup, 1 Appearance in Arab Club Champions Cup)	39	11
EST	2020–21	TLP1	12	3	1	0	11 (Note: Appearances in CAF Champions League)	1 (Note: Appearances in Tunisian Super Cup)	1	0	25	4
EST	2021–22	TLP1	16	3	0	0	8 (Note: Appearances in CAF Champions League)	0	0 (Note: Appearances in Arab Club Champions Cup)	0	24	3
EST	2022–23	TLP1	17	2	3	2	9 (Note: Appearances in CAF Champions League)	1	0 (Note: 1 Appearance in CAF Super Cup, 1 Appearance in FIFA Club World Cup, 1 Appearance in Tunisian Super Cup)	0	29	5
EST	Total		70	13	10	3	44	3	11	4	135	23
Career totals			70	13	10	3	44	3	11	4	135	23

=== International ===
Scores and results list Libya's goal tally first.

No	Date	Venue	Opponent	Score	Result	Competition
1.	9 June 2017	Petrosport Stadium, New Cairo, Egypt	Seychelles	3–0	5–1	2019 Africa Cup of Nations qualification
2.	4 September 2017	Mustapha Ben Jannet Stadium, Monastir, Tunisia	Guinea	1–0	1–0	2018 FIFA World Cup qualification
3.	17 November 2018	Stade Linité, Victoria, Seychelles	Seychelles	8–1	8–1	2019 Africa Cup of Nations qualification
4.	15 November 2019	Hammadi Agrebi Stadium, Tunis, Tunisia	Tunisia	1–2	1–4	2021 Africa Cup of Nations qualification
5.	13 November 2026	Taieb Mhiri Stadium, Sfax, Tunisia	Tunisia	2–0	2–0	2027 Africa Cup of Nations qualification

== Honours ==
Aves

- Taça de Portugal: 2017–18

Espérance de Tunis

- Tunisian Super Cup: 2018, 2019, 2021
- CAF Champions League: 2018–19
- Tunisian Ligue Professionnelle 1: 2018–19, 2019–20, 2020–21, 2021–22
