= Rami Jridi =

Tunisian footballer

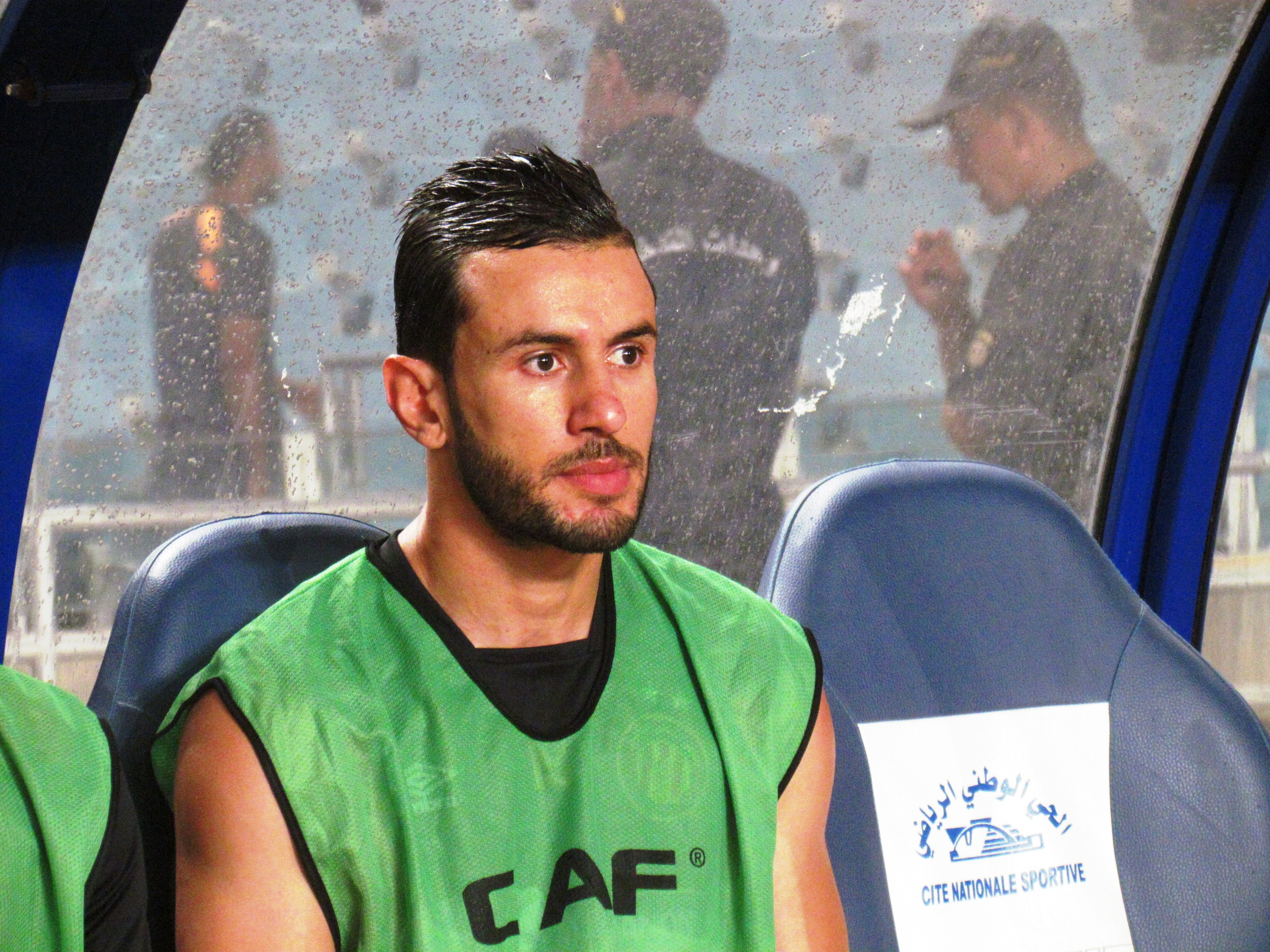
- Jridi with ES Tunis in 2018

Personal information
- Full name: Rami Jridi
- Date of birth: 25 April 1985 (age 41)
- Place of birth: Tunis, Tunisia
- Height: 1.84 m (6 ft 0 in)
- Position: Goalkeeper

Team information
- Current team: Dynamic Herb Cebu
- Number: 1

Youth career
- 1996 – 2006: ES Tunis

Senior career*
Years	Team	Apps	(Gls)
2006–2007	ES Tunis	6	(0)
2007	Espérance Zarzis	2	(0)
2007–2008	Etoile Kram	12	(0)
2008–2009	Jendouba	1	(0)
2009	Gafsa	3	(0)
2010–2012	Stade Tunisien	58	(0)
2012–2018	CS Sfaxien	161	(1)
2018–2020	ES Tunis	23	(0)
2021–2022	Soliman	7	(0)
2022–2023	Sidi Bouzid	13	(0)
2023–2024	Lubumbashi Sport	8	(0)
2024–2025	Gafsa	24	(0)
2025–	Dynamic Herb Cebu	9	(0)

International career^{‡}
2010–2017	Tunisia	17	(0)
- * Club domestic league appearances and goals as of 21 February 2026 ‡ National team caps and goals as of 17 March 2026

Rami Jridi (Arabic: رامي جريدي; born 25 April 1985) is a Tunisian professional footballer who plays as a goalkeeper for Philippines Football League club Dynamic Herb Cebu.

== Club career ==
Jridi started his career in the Espérance youth team when he was 11. He was promoted to the first team in 2006, where he made 6 appearances before moving to Espérance Zarzis for half a season in 2007, where he only made 2 appearances, before moving to Etoile Kram making 12 appearances in the league.

Jridi then was transferred to Jendouba and briefly to Gafsa, before making his move to Stade Tunisien in 2009. He has since been the first choice goalkeeper for his team, and his performances have merited a call-up to the national team.

== International career ==
Jridi was first called up into the Tunisia national team in 2010, but did not make his debut until 2011.
