= Anice Badri =

Tunisian footballer (born 1990)

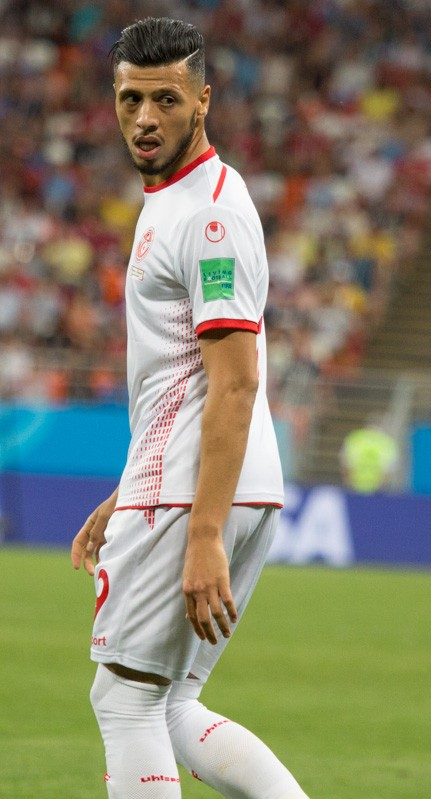
- Badri playing for Tunisia at the 2018 FIFA World Cup

Personal information
- Full name: Anice Badri
- Date of birth: 18 September 1990 (age 36)
- Place of birth: Lyon, France
- Height: 1.77 m (5 ft 10 in)
- Position: Forward

Senior career*
Years	Team	Apps	(Gls)
2010–2013	Lille	0	(0)
2013–2016	Royal Mouscron	85	(17)
2016–2020	Espérance de Tunis	102	(35)
2020	Al-Ittihad	11	(0)
2021–2023	Espérance de Tunis	40	(13)
2024–2025	AFC	5	(2)
2025–2026	TFC	9	(6)

International career^{‡}
2016–2019	Tunisia	28	(10)
- * Club domestic league appearances and goals as of 30 June 2023 ‡ National team caps and goals as of 1 January 2022

Anice Badri (Arabic: أنيس البدري; born 18 September 1990) is a Tunisian former professional footballer who played as a forward.

== Club career ==
Anice Badri spent his childhood in Lyon, his hometown. At the age of 13, he joined the Olympique Lyonnais training center and played for three years in the youth teams of the club. In 2006, he suffered a herniated disc and must stop football for more than a year. He found the ground in 2008 at AS Saint-Priest, where he remained a year under the team under 19 years. He then moved to Monts d'Or Azergues Foot where he joined the first team in July 2010. He only played five matches in CFA2 until September of this year, when he joined Lille OSC, club reserve team. He played for two and a half years, playing 40 games for 9 goals.

On 31 January 2013, Badri was loaned to Royal Mouscron-Péruwelz, a Belgian Second Division team. He is regularly lined up and his loan extended for a season. He became a holder during the 2013–2014 and was an important part in the victory of the club in the final round for the accession to the Belgian First Division A, he scored a goal at each of the last three matches. He is transferred free of charge by Mouscron-Péruwelz on 3 July 2014 and scored a goal for his first match in Belgian First Division A against Anderlecht. He was holder at each match during the first lap but then sees his second half of the season disturbed by minor injuries.

After his unsuccessful career in France and Belgium, he opted to return to his homeland Tunisia, where he joined the Tunisian giant Espérance Sportive de Tunis in a four years contract. Since then, from being unused and forgotten, he rose to prominence, helping the club to win two consecutive CAF Champions League titles for the first time, as well as making the club a formidable force in Tunisia.

== International career ==
Badri was born and raised in France to parents of Tunisian descent. Badri opted to represent the Tunisia national football team, and got his first call-up for a set of AFCON qualifiers against Togo in March 2016. He scored his first goal on 5 September 2017 against DR Congo in Kinshasa at the 79th minute which brought the team closer to qualifying for the World Cup in Russia.

In June 2018 he was named in Tunisia's 23-man squad for the 2018 World Cup in Russia.

== Personal life ==
Badri predominantly speaks French, having been born and raised in France. He also speaks fluent English, but he's not fluent in Arabic.

== Career statistics ==
=== International ===
As of 25 July 2019

Tunisia
Year	Apps	Goals
2016	1	0
2017	4	1
2018	9	2
2019	8	2
Total	22	5

=== International goals ===
Scores and results list Tunisia's goal tally first.

No	Date	Venue	Opponent	Score	Result	Competition
1.	5 September 2017	Stade des Martyrs, Kinshasa, DR Congo	DR Congo	2–2	2–2	2018 FIFA World Cup qualification
2.	28 May 2018	Estádio Municipal, Braga, Portugal	Portugal	1–2	2–2	Friendly
3.	1 June 2018	Stade de Genève, Geneva, Switzerland	Turkey	1–1	2–2	Friendly
4.	22 March 2019	Stade Olympique de Radès, Radès, Tunisia	Eswatini	2–0	4–0	2019 Africa Cup of Nations qualification
5.	11 June 2019	Gradski stadion Varaždin, Varaždin, Croatia	Croatia	1–0	2–1	Friendly
6.	21 September 2019	Stade Olympique de Radès, Radès, Tunisia	Libya	1–0	1–0	2020 African Nations Championship qualification
7.	20 October 2019	Stade Boubker Ammar, Salé, Morocco	Libya	1–0	2–1	2020 African Nations Championship qualification
8.	20 October 2019	Stade Boubker Ammar, Salé, Morocco	Libya	2–1	2–1	2020 African Nations Championship qualification

== Honours ==
Espérance de Tunis

- Tunisian Ligue Professionnelle 1: 2016–17, 2017–18, 2018–19, 2020–21, 2021–22
- Tunisian Cup: 2015–16
- Tunisian Super Cup: 2019
- CAF Champions League: 2018, 2018–19
- Arab Club Champions Cup: 2017

Individual

- Tunisian Footballer of the Year: 2019
