= Sameh Derbali =

Tunisian football player

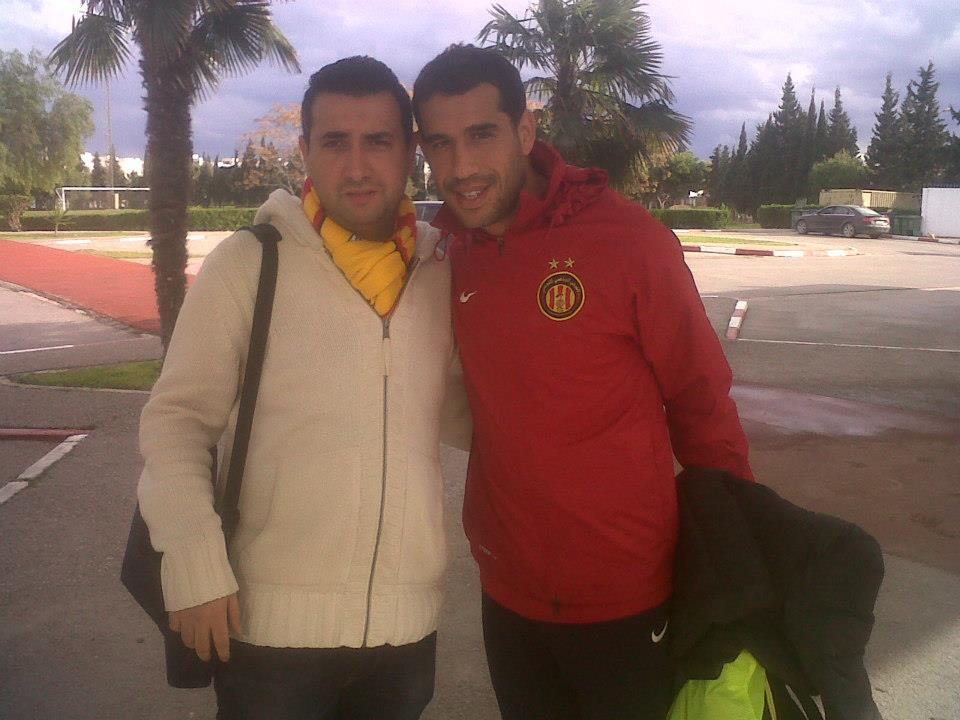
- Derbali (right) with a fan

Personal information
- Full name: Sameh Derbali
- Date of birth: 23 November 1986 (age 39)
- Place of birth: Jilma, Tunisia
- Height: 1.78 m (5 ft 10 in)
- Position: Defender

Senior career*
Years	Team	Apps	(Gls)
2006–2016	Espérance de Tunis	177	(6)
2009–2010	→ Olympique Béja (loan)	24	(2)
2016	Olympique Béja	9	(4)
2017	Al Ahli Tripoli	9	(2)
2017–2022	Espérance de Tunis	82	(2)

International career
2011–2013	Tunisia	11	(0)
- * Club domestic league appearances and goals

Sameh Derbali is a Tunisian retired professional football player who played as a right back for Espérance de Tunis, Olympique Béja and Al Ahli Tripoli. He has made 11 appearances for the Tunisia national football team.
