= 2018–19 Tunisian Cup =

Mohamed Beji Caid Essebsi Cup
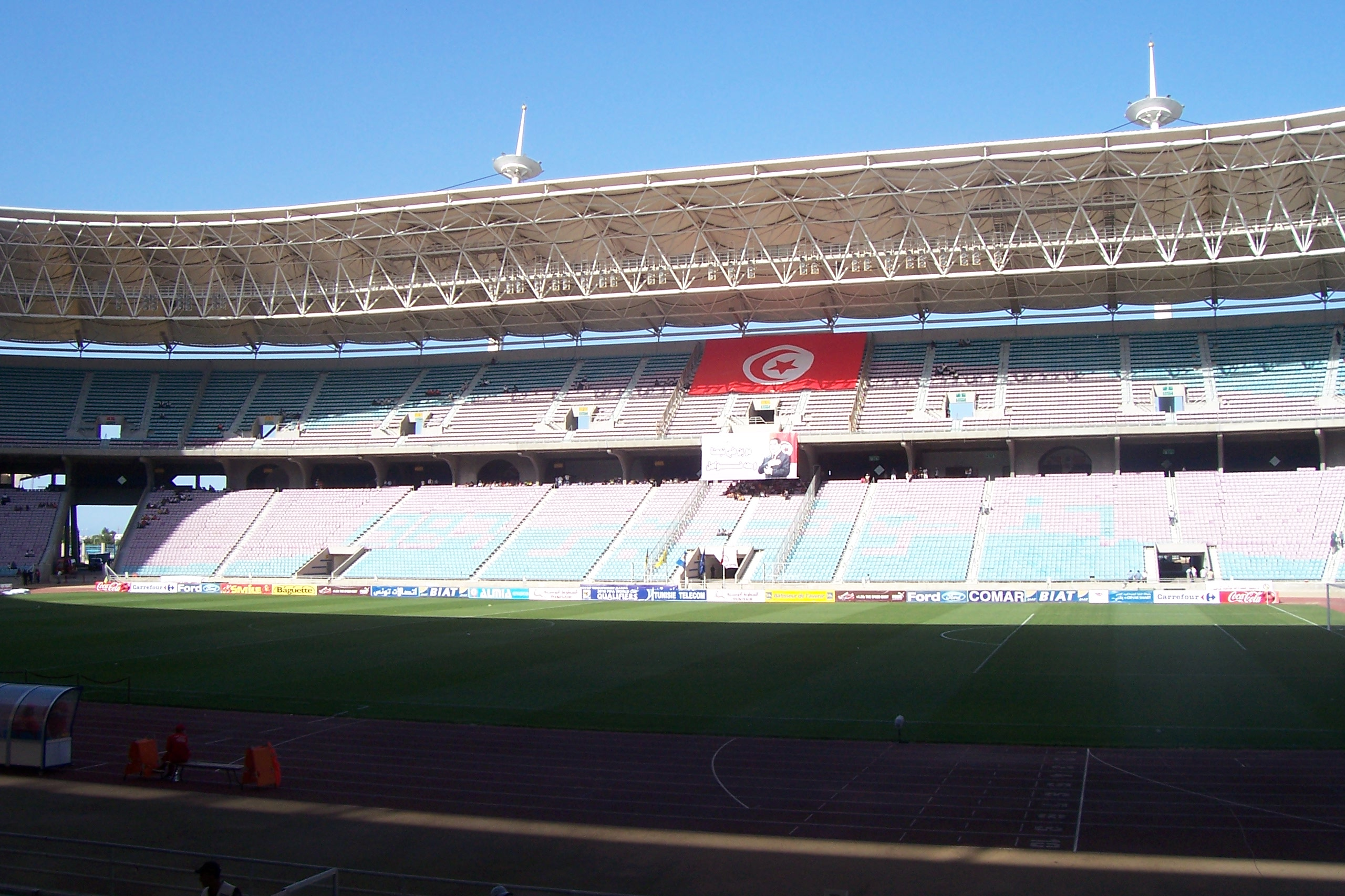
- Stade Olympique de Radès hosted the final

Tournament details
- Country: Tunisia

Final positions
- Champions: Club Sfaxien (5th title)
- Runners-up: Étoile du Sahel

The 2018–19 Tunisian Cup (Coupe de Tunisie) or Beji Caid Essebsi Cup was the 87th season of the football cup competition of Tunisia. The competition was organized by the Fédération Tunisienne de Football (FTF) and open to all clubs in Tunisia.

== First round ==
Results :

14 October 2018	Club de Jbeniana	1–1 (a.e.t.) (3–4 p)	Sporting Ben Arous
13:30	Ben Mbarek 46'		90+5' (og.) Jamil

14 October 2018	Avenir d'Oued Ellil	1–1 (a.e.t.) (7–6 p)	Olympique Médenine
13:30	Kechrid 52' (pen.)		2' (pen.) Jemaa

14 October 2018	Club de Korba	1–1 (a.e.t.) (2–4 p)	Association d'Ariana
13:30	Khemir 40'		87' Nasrallah

14 October 2018	Olympique Béja	1–0	Espérance de Zarzis
13:30	Cherni 2'

14 October 2018	Olympique Sidi Bouzid	1–2	Jendouba Sport
13:30	Messadi 78'		11' Ben Salem; 45' (pen.) Chaabouni

14 October 2018	Stade Sfaxien	0–1	Avenir de Marsa
13:30			45' Chortani

14 October 2018	Avenir de Soliman	2–0	Espoir de Hammam Sousse
13:30	Dhahri 45' (pen.); Ben Hammouda 90'

14 October 2018	Stade Africain Menzel Bourguiba	2–1	Étoile de Radès
13:30	Barhoumi 12'; Chahbi 60' (pen.)		11' Ben Amor

14 October 2018	El Gawafel de Gafsa	1–0	Océano de Kerkennah
13:30	Arfaoui 39'

14 October 2018	Association de Djerba	5–1	Union de Siliana
13:30	Ngoye 23'; Mannai 44' (pen.) 72', 90'; Ben Romdhan 87'		56' Thouabtia

== Round of 32 ==
29 January 2019	Sporting Ben Arous	0–1	Étoile de Métlaoui
13:30

29 January 2019	Avenir de Gabès	0–1 (a.e.t.)	Espérance de Tunis
13:30

29 January 2019	Avenir de Marsa	0–1	Club Sfaxien
13:30

29 January 2019	Étoile Alouienne	0–1	Étoile du Sahel
13:30

29 January 2019	Zitouna de Chammakh	1–2	Croissant de M'saken
13:30

29 January 2019	Al Ahly Sfaxien	0–2	Club Africain
13:30

30 January 2019	Union de Bou Salem	2–1	Union de Djerba Ajim
13:30

30 January 2019	Oasis de Kebili	2–1	El Alia Sports
13:30

30 January 2019	Avenir d'Oued Ellil	1–1 (a.e.t.) (4–5 p)	Jeunesse Kairouanaise
13:30

30 January 2019	Union de Ben Guerdane	3–2	Croissant Chebbien
13:30

30 January 2019	Avenir de Soliman	3–2	Union de Tataouine
13:30

30 January 2019	Club de Hammam-Lif	0–2	Stade Gabèsien
13:30

30 January 2019	Club Bizertin	0–1	Stade Tunisien
13:30

30 January 2019	Association de Djerba	1–0	El Makarem de Mahdia
13:30

30 January 2019	Avenir de Rejiche	1–1 (a.e.t.) (1–3 p)	Union Monastirienne
13:30

30 January 2019	El Gawafel de Gafsa	4–1	Stade Africain Menzel Bourguiba
13:30

== Round of 16 ==
22 March 2019	Oasis de Kebili	1–5	Étoile du Sahel
14:00

22 March 2019	Association de Djerba	1–1 (a.e.t.) (7–8 p)	Espérance de Tunis
14:00

26 March 2019	Union de Bou Salem	0–0 (a.e.t.) (8–7 p)	Jeunesse Kairouanaise
14:00

26 March 2019	Croissant de M'saken	0–1	Stade Gabèsien
14:00

26 March 2019	Union de Ben Guerdane	1–2	Union Monastirienne
14:00

26 March 2019	Avenir de Soliman	1–1 (a.e.t.) (1–4 p)	El Gawafel de Gafsa
14:00

2 April 2019	Club Africain	1–0	Étoile de Métlaoui
14:00

2 April 2019	Stade Tunisien	1–2 (a.e.t.)	Club Sfaxien
14:00

== Quarter-finals ==
9 May 2019	Club Sfaxien	1–0	El Gawafel de Gafsa
14:30

11 May 2019	Espérance de Tunis	3–1	Union Monastirienne
14:30

11 May 2019	Union de Bou Salem	2–3 (a.e.t.)	Stade Gabèsien
14:30

3 June 2019	Étoile du Sahel	1–0	Club Africain
14:30

== Semi-finals ==
6 June 2019	Stade Gabèsien	1–2	Étoile du Sahel
14:00

6 June 2019	Club Sfaxien	1–1 (a.e.t.) (4–2 p)	Espérance de Tunis
16:00

== Final ==
17 August 2019	Club Sfaxien	0–0 (a.e.t.) (5–4 p)	Étoile du Sahel	Stade Olympique de Radès, Tunis
18:00				Referee: Naim Hosni

== See also ==
- 2018–19 Tunisian Ligue Professionnelle 1
- 2018–19 Tunisian Ligue Professionnelle 2
- 2018–19 Tunisian Super Cup
