= 2020–21 Prince Mohammad bin Salman League =

Prince Mohammad bin Salman League
- Season: 2020–21
- Dates: 20 October 2020 – 31 May 2021
- Champions: Al-Hazem (2nd title)
- Promoted: Al-Hazem; Al-Fayha; Al-Tai
- Relegated: Al-Bukayriyah; Al-Thoqbah; Arar; Al-Nojoom
- Matches: 380
- Goals: 891 (2.34 per match)
- Top goalscorer: Ibrahim Diomandé (24 goals)
- Biggest home win: Hajer 8–0 Arar (25 May 2021)
- Biggest away win: Al-Khaleej 0–5 Al-Fayha (13 April 2021)
- Highest scoring: Hajer 8–0 Arar (25 May 2021)
- Longest winning run: 8 matches Al-Hazem
- Longest unbeaten run: 17 matches Al-Fayha
- Longest winless run: 15 matches Arar
- Longest losing run: 11 matches Al-Thoqbah
- All statistics correct as of 31 May 2021.

The 2020–21 Prince Mohammad bin Salman League was the fourth season of the Prince Mohammad bin Salman League under its current name, and the 44th season of the Saudi First Division since its establishment in 1976. The season started on 31 October 2020 as a consequence of the postponement of the previous season's conclusion due to the COVID-19 pandemic. Fixtures for the first half of the 2020–21 season were announced on 3 October 2020. Fixtures for the second half were announced on 18 January 2021.

The first team to be promoted was Al-Hazem, following their 4–2 away win against Al-Sahel on 20 April. They set the record for the earliest team to secure promotion with six games remaining as well as most points, most wins and most goals in a season. On 21 May, Al-Hazem secured their second title following a 1–0 away win against Hajer. The second team to be promoted was Al-Fayha, following 0–0 home draw with Al-Tai on 20 May. The final team to be promoted was Al-Tai who were promoted on the final matchday following a 2–0 away win over Arar.

== Team changes ==
The following teams have changed division since the 2020–21 season.

=== To MS League ===
Promoted from Second Division

- Hajer
- Al-Diriyah
- Arar
- Al-Sahel

Relegated from Pro League

- Al-Fayha
- Al-Hazem
- Al-Adalah

=== From MS League ===
Promoted to Pro League

- Al-Batin
- Al-Qadsiah
- Al-Ain

Relegated to Second Division

- Al-Mujazzal
- Al-Taqadom
- Al-Ansar
- Hetten

== Teams ==
A total of 20 teams are contesting the league, including 13 sides from the 2019–20 season, 4 promoted teams from the Second Division and the three relegated sides from the Pro League.

The first club to be relegated to the MS League was Al-Adalah, who were relegated after only a year in the top flight following a 1–1 home draw with Al-Raed. On 4 September 2020, Al-Hazem became the second club to be relegated, ending a 2-year stay in the Pro League following a 1–0 defeat away to Al-Shabab. On 9 September 2020, Al-Fayha became the third and final club to be relegated following a 1–0 defeat away to Al-Taawoun in the final matchday. Al-Fayha were relegated after three years in the Pro League.

The first club to be promoted was Hajer who were promoted following a 1–0 home win against Al-Akhdoud on 13 August 2020. The second club to be promoted was Al-Diriyah following a 1–1 home draw against Al-Qaisumah on 27 August 2020. The third club to be promoted was Al-Sahel who were promoted following a 3–0 away win against Al-Suqoor on 28 August 2020. The fourth and final club to be promoted was Arar who were promoted on the final matchday following a 1–0 away win against Al-Sharq.

Hajer defeated Al-Diriyah in the final to win their 2nd Second Division title. Arar defeated Al-Sahel in the third-place playoffs.

Al-Sahel and Arar will play in the Prince Mohammad bin Salman League for the first time in their history. Hajer return after a seasons absence and will play in their 29th overall season in the MS League. Al-Diriyah return to the MS League for the first time since getting relegated in 2015–16 season. They will play in their 4th season in the MS League. Al-Khaleej and Ohod will play in their 30th season in the MS League overtaking Al-Taawoun's record of 29 years in the second tier.

=== Stadia and locations ===
Locations of teams in the 2020–21 MS League

Note: Table lists in alphabetical order.

Team	Location	Stadium	Capacity
Al-Adalah	Al-Hasa (Al-Hulaylah)	Prince Abdullah bin Jalawi Stadium; Al-Fateh Club Stadium	26,000; 7,000
Al-Bukayriyah	Al Bukayriyah	Al-Bukayriyah Club Stadium	3,000
Al-Diriyah	Diriyah	Prince Turki bin Abdul Aziz Stadium (Riyadh)	15,000
Al-Fayha	Al Majma'ah	Al Majma'ah Sports City	7,000
Al-Hazem	Ar Rass	Al-Hazem Club Stadium	8,000
Al-Jabalain	Ha'il	Prince Abdul Aziz bin Musa'ed Stadium	12,000
Al-Jeel	Al-Hasa (Hofuf)	Prince Abdullah bin Jalawi Stadium; Al-Fateh Club Stadium	26,000; 7,000
Al-Kawkab	Al-Kharj	Al-Shoulla Club Stadium	5,200
Al-Khaleej	Saihat	Al-Khaleej Club Stadium	10,000
Al-Nahda	Dammam	Prince Fahd bin Salman Stadium	15,000
Al-Nojoom	Al-Hasa (Al-Shuqaiq)	Prince Abdullah bin Jalawi Stadium	26,000
Al-Sahel	Anak	Prince Saud bin Jalawi Stadium (Khobar)	15,000
Al-Shoulla	Al-Kharj	Al-Shoulla Club Stadium	5,200
Al-Tai	Ha'il	Prince Abdul Aziz bin Musa'ed Stadium	12,000
Al-Thoqbah	Khobar	Prince Saud bin Jalawi Stadium	15,000
Arar	Arar	Prince Abdullah bin Abdulaziz bin Musa'ed Sport City Stadium	5,650
Hajer	Al-Hasa (Hofuf)	Hajer Club Stadium; Prince Abdullah bin Jalawi Stadium	12,000; 26,000
Jeddah	Jeddah	Reserve Stadium in King Abdullah Sports City	1,000
Najran	Najran	Najran Sport City Stadium	18,000
Ohod	Medina	Prince Mohammed bin Abdul Aziz Stadium	24,000

=== Foreign players ===
The number of foreign players is limited to 4 per team.

Players name in bold indicates the player is registered during the mid-season transfer window.

Club	Player 1	Player 2	Player 3	Player 4	Former Players
Al-Adalah	(Brazil) Everton	(Brazil) Fernando Gabriel	(Greece) Savvas Gentsoglou	(Morocco) Rédah Atassi	
Al-Bukiryah	(Algeria) Abderaouf Natèche	(Ivory Coast) Mamadou Soro	(Syria) **Ward Al Salama**	(Tunisia) Mehdi Ressaissi	(Libya) Bader Hassan
Al-Diriyah	(Tunisia) Bilel Souissi	(Tunisia) **Hichem Essifi**	(Tunisia) Mahmoud Ben Salah	(Tunisia) Mohamed Aouichi	(Ivory Coast) Hermann Kouao
Al-Fayha	(Ivory Coast) Soualio Ouattara	(Ghana) **Samuel Owusu**	(Nigeria) Reuben Gabriel	(Nigeria) **Tunde Adeniji**	(Brazil) William Alves (Tunisia) Youssef Fouzai
Al-Hazem	(Brazil) Muralha	(France) Karim Yoda	(Guinea) Ousmane Barry	(Mali) Ibrahima Tandia	
Al-Jabalain	(Brazil) Carlão	(Brazil) Diego Miranda	(Brazil) **Sidevaldo Pereira**	(Portugal) Ricardo Ribeiro	(Brazil) Edson Cariús
Al-Jeel	(Brazil) Francisco Pereira	(Ivory Coast) **Késsé Amangoua**	(Liberia) **Marcus Macauley**	(Palestine) Mohammed Bassim	(Brazil) Sidevaldo Pereira (France) Jonathan Béhé
Al-Kawkab	(Ivory Coast) **Manucho**	(Senegal) **Aliou Cissé**	(Tunisia) **Jilani Abdessalam**		(Ghana) Izaka Aboudou (Senegal) Youssoupha Mbengué (Tunisia) Chaker Rguiî (Tunisia) Zied Ounalli
Al-Khaleej	(Algeria) Hacène Ogbi	(Brazil) Rogerinho	(Cameroon) **Yannick N'Djeng**	(Ghana) Samuel Sarfo	(Libya) Muhanad Madyen
Al-Nahda	(Mali) Cheibane Traoré	(Tunisia) Hachem Abbès	(Tunisia) Lassaâd Jaziri	(Tunisia) Mossaâb Sassi	
Al-Nojoom	(Gabon) Ulysse Ndong	(Nigeria) George Akpabio	(Tunisia) **Ahmed Ben Salah**		(The Gambia) Lamin Samateh (Nigeria) Anthony Bassey
Al-Sahel	(Senegal) Abdoulaye Dieng	(Tunisia) Haythem Mhamdi	(Tunisia) **Sadok Touj**	(Zambia) **Mwape Musonda**	(Brazil) Patrick Carvalho (Tunisia) Ammar Jemal
Al-Shoulla	(Brazil) **Lúcio Flávio**	(Brazil) Pitty	(Ivory Coast) Sylla Daouda	(Guinea-Bissau) **Piqueti**	(Democratic Republic of the Congo) Junior Mapuku (Nigeria) Harmony Ikande
Al-Tai	(Brazil) Daniel Amora	(Ivory Coast) **Gbagbo Junior Magbi**	(Ivory Coast) **Ismail Kouakou**	(Tunisia) **Zied Ounalli**	(Algeria) Mohamed Tiaïba (Brazil) Jailson (Brazil) Jorge Fellipe
Al-Thoqbah	(Algeria) **Abdelaziz Ali Guechi**	(Nigeria) **Oke Akpoveta**	(Tunisia) Amir Omrani	(Tunisia) Oussema Amdouni	(Ghana) Cosmos Dauda (Jordan) Mohammad Zureiqat
Arar	(Brazil) Carlos Geovane	(Brazil) **Jackson da Silva**	(Tunisia) Malek Miladi	(Tunisia) **Zied Ben Salem**	(Ivory Coast) Gnamien Gislain Yikpe (Nigeria) Udoh Etop
Hajer	(Brazil) Adriano Pardal	(Brazil) Lázaro	(Nigeria) Peter Nworah	(Tunisia) Oussema Boughanmi	
Jeddah	(Algeria) Hamza Aït Ouamar	(Mauritania) Ablaye Sy	(Mauritania) Mohamed M'Bareck	(Zambia) Saith Sakala	
Najran	(Brazil) Carlos Coppetti	(Brazil) Carlos Henrique	(Brazil) **Jailson**	(Portugal) **Yazalde**	(Nigeria) Gbolahan Salami (Brazil) Jonatas
Ohod	(Ivory Coast) Ibrahim Diomandé	(Morocco) **Zakaria Lahlali**	(Nigeria) **Gbolahan Salami**	(Tunisia) Abdessalem Hallaoui	(Tunisia) Mabrouk Jendli (Tunisia) Maher Hannachi

== League table ==
Pos	Team	Pld	W	D	L	GF	GA	GD	Pts	Promotion, qualification or relegation
1	Al-Hazem (C, P)	38	28	7	3	77	27	+50	91	Promotion to the Pro League
2	Al-Fayha (P)	38	24	9	5	72	27	+45	81	Promotion to the Pro League
3	Al-Tai (P)	38	23	8	7	58	33	+25	77	Promotion to the Pro League
4	Al-Jabalain	38	22	10	6	53	27	+26	76	
5	Hajer	38	15	10	13	49	37	+12	55	
6	Ohod	38	13	15	10	51	52	−1	54	
7	Al-Kawkab	38	13	13	12	47	48	−1	52 (Note: Al-Kawkab finished ahead of Al-Khaleej on overall goal difference: Al-Kawkab −1, Al-Khaleej −5 (Al-Kawkab 2–2 Al-Khaleej, Al-Khaleej 0–0 Al-Kawkab).)	
8	Al-Khaleej	38	13	13	12	42	47	−5	52	
9	Al-Shoulla	38	13	12	13	37	33	+4	51	
10	Al-Diriyah	38	13	9	16	34	39	−5	48 (Note: Al-Diriyah finished ahead of Jeddah on overall goal difference: Al-Diriyah −5, Jeddah −6 (Jeddah 1–2 Al-Diriyah, Al-Diriyah 0–1 Jeddah).)	
11	Jeddah	38	13	9	16	48	54	−6	48	
12	Al-Adalah	38	10	16	12	44	39	+5	46 (Note: Al-Adalah finished ahead of Al-Sahel on head-to-head points: Al-Adalah 3–0 Al-Sahel, Al-Sahel 1–2 Al-Adalah.)	
13	Al-Sahel	38	11	13	14	34	48	−14	46	
14	Al-Jeel	38	11	11	16	37	52	−15	44	
15	Najran	38	10	13	15	43	47	−4	43	
16	Al-Nahda	38	9	15	14	37	45	−8	42	
17	Al-Bukayriyah (R)	38	11	7	20	29	48	−19	40	Relegation to the Second Division
18	Al-Thoqbah (R)	38	10	7	21	45	60	−15	37	Relegation to the Second Division
19	Arar (R)	38	4	14	20	28	62	−34	26	Relegation to the Second Division
20	Al-Nojoom (R)	38	6	5	27	27	67	−40	23	Relegation to the Second Division

Source: goalzz.com
Rules for classification: 1) Points; 2) Head-to-head points; 3) Head-to-head goal difference; 4) Total goal difference; 5) Total goals scored; 6) Fair-play points (Note: Head-to-head record is used only after all the matches between the teams in question have been played).
(C) Champions; (P) Promoted; (R) Relegated

=== Positions by round ===
The table lists the positions of teams after each week of matches. In order to preserve chronological evolvements, any postponed matches are not included in the round at which they were originally scheduled but added to the full round they were played immediately afterward.

Team ╲ Round	1	2	3	4	5	6	7	8	9	10	11	12	13	14	15	16	17	18	19	20	21	22	23	24	25	26	27	28	29	30	31	32	33	34	35	36	37	38
Al-Hazem	3	1	1	1	1	1	1	1	1	1	1	1	1	1	1	1	1	1	1	1	1	1	1	1	1	1	1	1	1	1	1	1	1	1	1	1	1	1
Al-Fayha	1	9	4	4	4	2	3	2	2	2	2	2	2	2	2	2	2	2	3	2	2	2	2	2	2	2	2	2	2	2	2	2	2	2	2	2	2	2
Al-Tai	16	17	19	19	20	19	16	16	15	13	10	8	7	8	5	5	4	4	5	5	6	4	4	5	6	4	4	4	4	4	4	4	4	4	4	4	3	3
Al-Jabalain	2	2	3	3	2	4	2	3	3	3	3	3	3	3	3	3	3	3	2	3	3	3	3	3	3	3	3	3	3	3	3	3	3	3	3	3	4	4
Hajer	9	15	11	11	5	5	7	6	5	6	5	5	4	5	7	6	5	5	4	4	5	6	6	4	4	5	5	5	5	5	5	5	6	6	5	5	5	5
Ohod	12	8	9	13	10	10	11	12	13	14	15	13	10	12	11	12	11	11	9	11	9	9	9	8	8	8	9	8	6	7	7	7	7	8	9	8	6	6
Al-Kawkab	4	4	6	8	9	9	9	11	12	12	9	9	9	9	10	11	10	10	12	10	12	15	11	10	10	7	7	7	7	6	6	6	5	5	6	7	9	7
Al-Khaleej	6	3	5	6	13	14	10	10	7	7	7	7	8	7	6	8	8	8	7	7	4	5	5	6	5	6	6	6	8	8	9	11	8	7	8	6	7	8
Al-Shoulla	17	14	13	15	15	15	15	15	16	17	16	16	17	17	15	15	15	15	16	16	15	13	14	15	13	11	10	10	11	10	10	9	10	9	7	9	8	9
Al-Diriyah	10	11	7	5	6	6	5	5	6	5	6	6	6	6	8	7	7	6	6	6	7	7	8	9	9	10	11	11	10	11	12	12	12	15	15	14	12	10
Jeddah	5	10	15	14	14	11	12	9	11	8	13	11	12	14	14	17	16	16	13	15	16	14	10	13	14	12	12	12	13	12	11	10	11	14	11	11	13	11
Al-Adalah	7	5	2	2	3	3	4	4	4	4	4	4	5	4	4	4	6	7	8	8	8	8	7	7	7	9	8	9	9	9	8	8	9	10	10	10	11	12
Al-Sahel	14	12	10	10	12	7	8	7	10	11	11	12	13	10	13	13	13	17	17	17	17	17	16	16	15	16	14	15	15	14	13	14	13	11	13	13	10	13
Al-Jeel	13	7	14	7	8	12	13	13	9	10	14	15	14	15	16	16	14	12	14	12	10	11	12	11	12	15	15	16	16	15	15	15	14	12	12	12	14	14
Najran	18	16	12	12	7	8	6	8	8	9	8	10	11	11	9	10	12	13	15	13	13	10	13	12	11	13	13	13	12	13	14	13	15	13	14	15	15	15
Al-Nahda	8	6	8	9	11	13	14	14	14	15	17	17	16	16	17	14	17	14	10	9	11	12	15	14	16	14	16	14	14	16	16	16	16	16	16	16	16	16
Al-Bukayriyah	11	13	16	16	16	17	17	18	18	18	18	18	18	18	19	19	19	19	19	19	18	18	18	18	18	17	17	17	18	17	18	17	18	17	18	17	17	17
Al-Thoqbah	15	20	17	17	17	16	19	17	17	16	12	14	15	13	12	9	9	9	11	14	14	16	17	17	17	18	18	18	17	18	17	18	17	18	17	18	18	18
Arar	20	18	18	18	19	18	18	19	19	19	19	19	19	19	18	18	18	18	18	18	19	19	20	20	19	19	19	19	19	19	19	19	19	19	19	19	19	19
Al-Nojoom	19	19	20	20	18	20	20	20	20	20	20	20	20	20	20	20	20	20	20	20	20	20	19	19	20	20	20	20	20	20	20	20	20	20	20	20	20	20

Leader
Promotion to the Pro League
Relegation to the Second Division

Updated to match(es) played on 31 May 2021. Source:

== Results ==
Home \ Away	ADA	BUK	DIR	FAY	HAZ	JAB	JEL	KAW	KHJ	NAH	NOJ	SAH	SHO	TAI	THO	ARA	HJR	JED	NAJ	OHD
Al-Adalah		0–0	0–2	0–0	0–1	0–1	1–1	0–1	1–0	1–1	0–1	3–0	1–1	3–1	3–0	3–1	1–1	1–2	0–2	1–1
Al-Bukayriyah	1–1		0–2	0–1	0–1	0–2	0–1	1–1	2–3	2–0	1–0	1–0	1–0	0–3	3–2	0–0	0–2	0–2	1–0	2–1
Al-Diriyah	1–0	1–2		2–2	0–1	0–1	2–1	2–2	0–3	1–1	0–2	1–2	0–1	0–2	0–1	1–0	3–0	0–1	0–0	0–0
Al-Fayha	1–0	2–1	2–0		0–0	2–0	1–0	1–0	1–1	1–2	3–1	4–0	3–1	0–0	3–2	4–0	2–0	2–1	1–0	5–2
Al-Hazem	1–4	2–1	2–0	1–0		0–0	4–1	2–0	1–0	1–1	3–1	0–0	1–0	3–1	4–0	2–0	0–1	5–0	0–0	5–1
Al-Jabalain	3–1	1–0	1–0	1–1	1–2		1–1	0–0	2–0	0–0	4–0	2–0	0–0	1–1	2–0	1–0	2–1	3–1	0–1	2–1
Al-Jeel	1–1	0–1	0–1	0–4	1–4	0–1		1–2	3–3	1–0	1–2	3–1	1–0	1–3	0–2	2–1	0–1	2–1	1–1	3–2
Al-Kawkab	1–1	2–1	2–3	2–1	1–1	2–2	1–2		2–2	2–2	2–0	0–0	1–2	1–2	2–0	0–1	1–1	3–2	1–2	1–0
Al-Khaleej	0–0	0–0	0–1	0–5	2–4	1–1	2–2	0–0		1–0	2–1	0–1	1–3	1–0	3–1	2–1	1–1	0–1	1–0	3–0
Al-Nahda	1–1	3–2	1–0	0–2	1–2	0–1	2–0	0–1	1–2		2–1	1–1	1–0	0–0	0–0	1–1	0–1	1–1	3–2	2–3
Al-Nojoom	1–3	3–1	0–1	1–1	0–1	2–1	1–2	0–0	1–3	0–1		0–1	1–1	0–3	1–3	0–0	0–1	1–2	1–0	1–3
Al-Sahel	1–2	0–0	0–0	2–1	2–4	0–1	1–1	1–3	0–0	2–2	1–0		0–0	0–1	0–0	1–0	4–1	0–2	1–1	1–0
Al-Shoulla	0–0	1–0	1–0	1–2	0–2	1–0	0–0	3–1	0–0	0–1	3–1	5–1		0–2	0–0	3–1	0–0	0–1	1–1	0–0
Al-Tai	1–3	2–1	3–2	1–0	3–3	1–3	1–0	2–1	3–0	3–1	4–1	2–0	1–0		3–1	0–0	0–2	1–0	0–0	0–0
Al-Thoqbah	1–2	1–2	2–2	0–1	1–2	3–2	1–2	1–2	1–0	1–1	4–0	0–1	2–3	1–2		2–1	2–1	3–1	0–2	2–2
Arar	0–0	1–1	1–1	1–4	1–5	1–2	0–1	0–0	2–3	3–1	1–0	3–2	2–3	0–2	1–1		0–0	1–1	1–1	0–1
Hajer	1–1	3–0	0–1	0–1	0–1	1–2	2–0	3–0	0–0	1–1	2–0	1–1	2–1	0–1	1–2	8–0		2–1	4–3	2–3
Jeddah	2–2	0–1	1–2	1–1	0–2	1–2	1–1	1–2	0–1	2–1	4–1	2–3	1–1	2–0	2–1	1–0	1–1		2–2	1–1
Najran	3–2	2–0	0–1	2–2	0–2	1–3	0–0	3–1	1–1	2–1	1–0	0–2	0–1	1–2	2–1	1–1	0–1	2–3		3–3
Ohod	2–1	2–0	1–1	1–5	3–2	1–1	0–0	2–3	4–0	0–0	1–1	1–1	1–0	1–1	1–0	1–1	1–0	2–0	2–1	

Updated to match(es) played on 31 May 2021. Source: goalzz.com
Legend: Blue = home team win; Yellow = draw; Red = away team win.

== Statistics ==
As of 31 May 2021

=== Scoring ===
==== Top scorers ====
Rank	Player	Club	Goals
1	(Ivory Coast) Ibrahim Diomandé	Ohod	24
2	(Brazil) Carlão	Al-Jabalain	21
3	(Guinea) Ousmane Barry	Al-Hazem	19
4	(Ivory Coast) Mamadou Soro	Al-Bukayriyah	15
5	(Mali) Ibrahima Tandia	Al-Hazem	13
5	(Tunisia) Amir Omrani	Al-Thoqbah	13
5	(France) Karim Yoda	Al-Hazem	13
8	(Brazil) Everton	Al-Adalah	12
9	(Nigeria) Tunde Adeniji	Al-Fayha	11
9	(Brazil) Adriano Pardal	Hajer	11

==== Hat-tricks ====
Player	For	Against	Result	Date	Ref.
(Brazil) Carlão	Al-Jabalain	Najran	3–1 (A)	21 October 2020	
(Brazil) Patrick Carvalho	Al-Sahel	Jeddah	3–2 (A)	3 November 2020	
(Brazil) Everton	Al-Adalah	Al-Tai	3–1 (H)	8 November 2020	
(Saudi Arabia) Abdullah Al-Dossari	Al-Fayha	Al-Sahel	4–0 (H)	29 January 2021	
(Ivory Coast) Ibrahim Diomandé	Ohod	Al-Hazem	3–2 (H)	26 February 2021	
(Nigeria) Tunde Adeniji	Al-Fayha	Ohod	5–2 (H)	21 March 2021	
(Ivory Coast) Ibrahim Diomandé	Ohod	Al-Nojoom	3–1 (A)	20 May 2021	
(Saudi Arabia) Hassan Al-Solan	Hajer	Arar	8–0 (H)	25 May 2021	

Note

(H) – Home; (A) – Away

=== Clean sheets ===
Rank	Player	Club	Clean sheets
1	(Saudi Arabia) Moslem Al Freej	Al-Fayha	18
2	(Portugal) Ricardo Ribeiro	Al-Jabalain	17
3	(Saudi Arabia) Saad Al-Saleh	Al-Tai	15
4	(Saudi Arabia) Abdulraouf Al-Daqeel	Hajer	14
5	(Saudi Arabia) Bandar Al-Butti	Al-Sahel	13
5	(Saudi Arabia) Dawod Al Saeed	Al-Hazem	13
7	(Tunisia) Bilel Souissi	Al-Diriyah	11
7	(Tunisia) Abdessalem Hallaoui	Ohod	11
7	(Saudi Arabia) Abdulrahman Dagriri	Al-Shoulla	11
10	(Algeria) Abderaouf Natèche	Al-Bukayriyah	10

== Number of teams by region ==
Rank	Region	Number	Teams
1	Eastern Province	8	Al-Adalah, Al-Jeel, Al-Khaleej, Al-Nahda, Al-Nojoom, Al-Sahel, Al-Thoqbah and Hajer
2	Riyadh	4	Al-Diriyah, Al-Fayha, Al-Kawkab and Al-Shoulla
3	Al-Qassim	2	Al-Bukayriyah and Al-Hazem
3	Ha'il	2	Al-Jabalain and Al-Tai
6	Mecca	1	Jeddah
6	Medina	1	Ohod
6	Najran	1	Najran
6	Northern Borders	1	Arar

== See also ==
- 2020–21 Saudi Professional League
- 2020–21 Saudi Second Division
