= Gabès derby =

Football rivalry in Tunisia

Gabes derby
- Sport: Football
- Location: Gabès, Tunisia
- Teams: AS Gabès; Stade Gabèsien
- First meeting: ASG 0–1 SG; Tunisian Ligue 1, 1981
- Latest meeting: ASG 0–3 SG; Tunisian Ligue 2, 2023
- Stadiums: Gabès Municipal Stadium

Statistics
- Total meetings: 36
- Most wins: AS Gabès (11)

The Gabés derby is a football match between the Stade Gabesien and the AS Gabès, is considered the second most important derby in Tunisia. It is played in Pro League 1 or Pro League 2. The derby takes place It the Gabès Municipal Stadium, better known as the Zrig stadium, the name of the neighborhood where it is located.

== History ==
Stade Gabesien was founded in 1957, and AS Gabès in 1978. Each team represents a specific neighborhood in the city: Jara for Stade Gabésien, and El Menzel for Avenir Sportif de Gabès.

The rivalry is rooted in geography, as both clubs operate within the same city Gabès. However, it has been intensified by the competition between the two sides for a spot in Tunisian Ligue Professionnelle 1. Many have advocated for a merger of the two clubs, but this has never come to fruition. The Tunisian press has suggested that the creation of a single, major club for Gabès could establish a new footballing hub in the country, capable of challenging the dominance of the clubs from Tunis.

== Stadium ==
Gabès Municipal Stadium is a multi-use stadium in Gabès, Tunisia. It is currently used mostly for football matches and is the home ground of Stade Gabèsien and AS Gabès. The stadium has a capacity of 15,000 spectators.

== Results ==
Season	Team 1	Score	Team 2	Team 1 scorers	Team 2 scorers
1981–82 Tunisian National Championship 2	AS Gabès	0–1	Stade Gabèsien	—	Fethi Moussa
1981–82 Tunisian National Championship 2	Stade Gabèsien	2–0	AS Gabès	Abderrazek Amri, Samir Zehdi	—
1985–86 Tunisian National Championship 2	AS Gabès	1–1	Stade Gabèsien	Adel Ghliss	Foued Gaied
1985–86 Tunisian National Championship 2	Stade Gabèsien	0–0	AS Gabès	—	—
1987–88 Tunisian National Championship 2	Stade Gabèsien	2–1	AS Gabès	Ali Chahbani, Abderrazek Amri	Kamel Zrig
1987–88 Tunisian National Championship 2	AS Gabès	0–0	Stade Gabèsien	—	—
1989–90 Tunisian National Championship 2	Stade Gabèsien	0–0	AS Gabès	—	—
1989–90 Tunisian National Championship 2	AS Gabès	2–0	Stade Gabèsien	Mongi Bouchaa, Abdelkarim Jedidi	—
1990–91 Tunisian National Championship 2	Stade Gabèsien	1–0	AS Gabès	Mabrouk Saadallah	—
1990–91 Tunisian National Championship 2	AS Gabès	1–0	Stade Gabèsien	Mongi Bouchaa	—
1991–92 Tunisian National Championship 2	AS Gabès	0–0	Stade Gabèsien	—	—
1991–92 Tunisian National Championship 2	Stade Gabèsien	1–3	AS Gabès	Ali Chahbani	Mounir Nahali, Omar Abdelkarim, Abdelkarim Jedidi
1992–93 Tunisian National Championship 2	AS Gabès	1–0	Stade Gabèsien	Adel Berrich	—
1992–93 Tunisian National Championship 2	Stade Gabèsien	0–1	AS Gabès	—	Omar Abdelkarim
2004–05 Tunisian Ligue Professionnelle 2	AS Gabès	1–0	Stade Gabèsien	—	Abdelmajid Dini
2004–05 Tunisian Ligue Professionnelle 2	Stade Gabèsien	0–2	AS Gabès	—	Raouf Gabsi, Mohamed Chibani
2005–06 Tunisian Ligue Professionnelle 2	AS Gabès	0–2	Stade Gabèsien	—	Karim Hosni
2005–06 Tunisian Ligue Professionnelle 2	Stade Gabèsien	0–0	AS Gabès	—	—
2006–07 Tunisian Ligue Professionnelle 2	AS Gabès	0–0	Stade Gabèsien	—	—
2006–07 Tunisian Ligue Professionnelle 2	Stade Gabèsien	1–1	AS Gabès	Dramé Karfa	Saber Sghaier
2008–09 Tunisian Ligue Professionnelle 2	AS Gabès	1–1	Stade Gabèsien	Badreddine Hachaichi	Dramé Karfa
2008–09 Tunisian Ligue Professionnelle 2	Stade Gabèsien	1–0	AS Gabès	Walid Chettaoui	—
2009–10 Tunisian Ligue Professionnelle 2	AS Gabès	1–1	Stade Gabèsien	Ahmed Douaib	Anis Trabelsi
2009–10 Tunisian Ligue Professionnelle 2	Stade Gabèsien	0–0	AS Gabès	—	—
2014–15 Tunisian Ligue Professionnelle 1	AS Gabès	0–1	Stade Gabèsien	—	Brahima Touré
2014–15 Tunisian Ligue Professionnelle 1	Stade Gabèsien	2–1	AS Gabès	Akrem Ben Sassi (2)	Bilel Yaken
2016–17 Tunisian Ligue Professionnelle 1	Stade Gabèsien	1–1	AS Gabès	Youssef Fouzai	Lamjed Ameur
2016–17 Tunisian Ligue Professionnelle 1	AS Gabès	0–0	Stade Gabèsien	—	—
2016–17 Tunisian Ligue Professionnelle 1	Stade Gabèsien	2–2	AS Gabès	Ahmed Hosni, Hichem Essifi	Slim Zakar
2016–17 Tunisian Ligue Professionnelle 1	AS Gabès	1–1	Stade Gabèsien	Abdelaziz Ali Guechi	Akrem Ben Sassi
2017–18 Tunisian Ligue Professionnelle 1	Stade Gabèsien	1–1	AS Gabès	Izaka Aboudou	Abdelhamid Darraji
2017–18 Tunisian Ligue Professionnelle 1	Stade Gabèsien	0–1	AS Gabès	—	Slim Mezlini
2018–19 Tunisian Ligue Professionnelle 1	Stade Gabèsien	2–0	AS Gabès	Lamjed Ameur (2)	—
2018–19 Tunisian Ligue Professionnelle 1	AS Gabès	1–1	Stade Gabèsien	Alaa Abdelwahed	Izaka Aboudou
2023–24 Tunisian Ligue Professionnelle 2	Stade Gabèsien	1–0	AS Gabès	Mabrouk Saadallah	—
2023–24 Tunisian Ligue Professionnelle 2	AS Gabès	3–0	Stade Gabèsien	Dhia Maatougui, Ahmed Htiwech, Nour El Beji	—
