= Saad Bguir =

Tunisian footballer (born 1994)

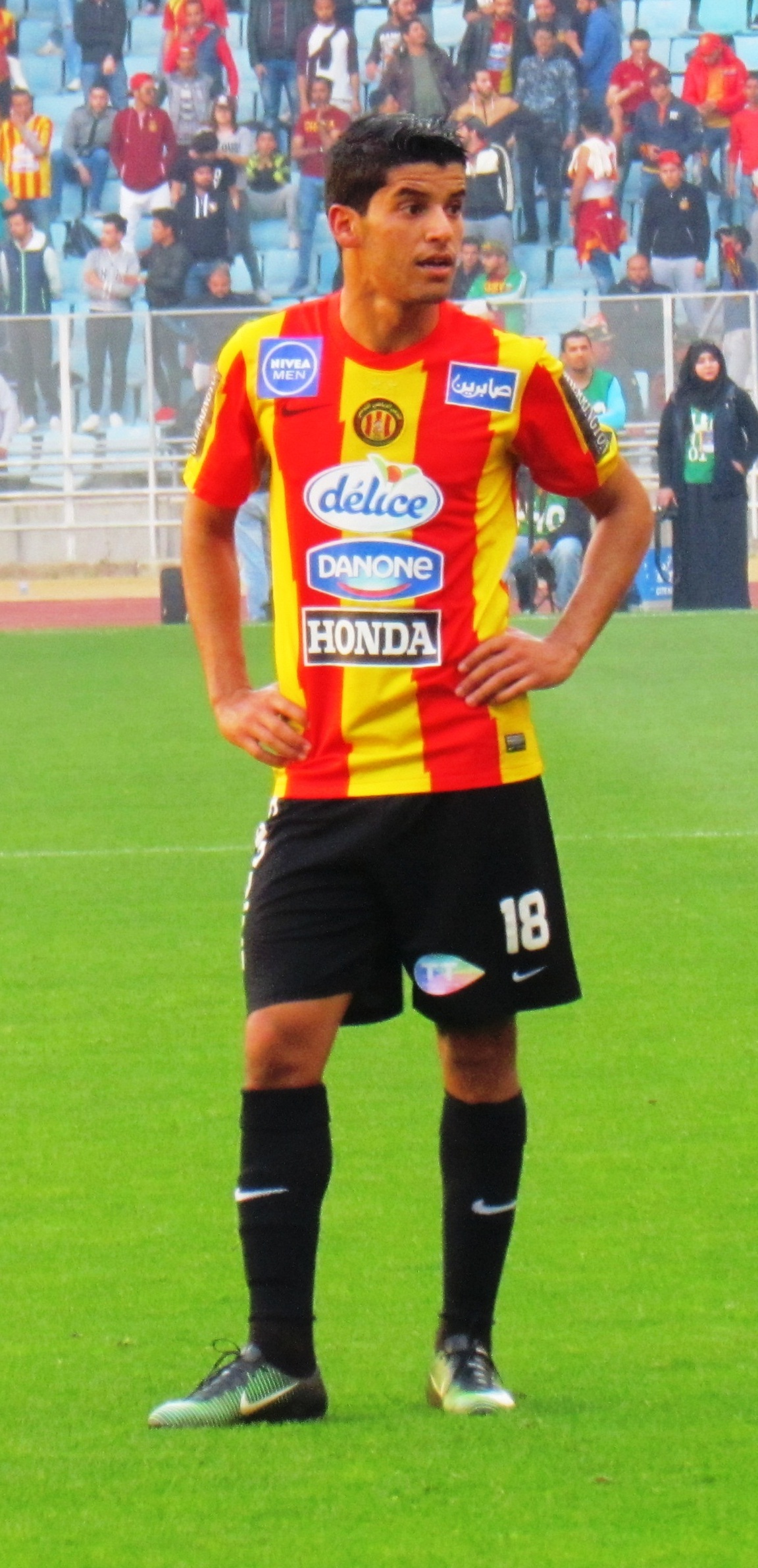
- Bguir with Espérance Tunis in 2017

Personal information
- Full name: Saad Abdullah Bguir
- Date of birth: 22 March 1994 (age 32)
- Place of birth: Tataouine, Tunisia
- Height: 1.78 m (5 ft 10 in)
- Position: Attacking midfielder

Youth career
- 2008–2010: US Tataouine

Senior career*
| Years | Team | Apps | (Gls) |
| 2010–2015 | Stade Gabèsien | 61 | (9) |
| 2015–2019 | Espérance Tunis | 83 | (23) |
| 2019–2024 | Abha | 134 | (38) |
| 2024–2025 | Al-Wehda | 25 | (3) |

International career^{‡}
| 2015–2022 | Tunisia | 20 | (5) |
Medal record
Representing Tunisia
Men's football
FIFA Arab Cup
| Runner-up | 2021 Qatar |
- * Club domestic league appearances and goals as of 23:13, 6 March 2025 (UTC) ‡ National team caps and goals as of 20:16, 29 October 2026 (UTC)

Saad Abdellah Bguir (Arabic: سعد عبدالله بقير; born 22 March 1994) is a Tunisian professional footballer who plays as an attacking midfielder.

== Club career ==
In the 2014–15 season, Stade Gabésien went all the way to the Tunisian Cup Finals, losing to the Etoile Sportive du Sahel. During the final, Saad scored a free kick and gave two assists. He was awarded MVP of the match.

On 3 September 2024, Bguir joined Al-Wehda on a one-year contract.

== Career statistics ==
=== Club ===
As of match played on 24 May 2024

Appearances and goals by club, season and competition
| Club | Season | League | | | Cup | | Continental | | Other | | Total | |
| Club | Season | Division | Apps | Goals | Apps | Goals | Apps | Goals | Apps | Goals | Apps | Goals |
|---|---|---|---|---|---|---|---|---|---|---|---|---|
| Stade Gabèsien | 2012–13 | Tunisian Ligue Professionnelle 1 | 5 | 0 | 0 | 0 | — | | — | | 5 | 0 |
| Stade Gabèsien | 2013–14 | Tunisian Ligue Professionnelle 1 | 29 | 5 | 1 | 0 | — | | — | | 30 | 5 |
| Stade Gabèsien | 2014–15 | Tunisian Ligue Professionnelle 1 | 27 | 4 | 3 | 1 | — | | — | | 30 | 5 |
| Stade Gabèsien | Total | | 61 | 9 | 4 | 1 | — | | — | | 65 | 10 |
| EST | 2015–16 | Tunisian Ligue Professionnelle 1 | 29 | 12 | 3 | 0 | 2 (Note: Appearances in CAF Confederation Cup) | 1 | — | | 34 | 13 |
| EST | 2016–17 | Tunisian Ligue Professionnelle 1 | 19 | 4 | 3 | 2 | 8 | 0 | — | | 30 | 6 |
| EST | 2017–18 | Tunisian Ligue Professionnelle 1 | 18 | 2 | 1 | 0 | 9 (Note: Appearances in CAF Champions League) | 3 | 5 (Note: Appearances in Arab Club Champions Cup) | 2 | 31 | 4 |
| EST | 2018–19 | Tunisian Ligue Professionnelle 1 | 17 | 5 | 4 | 0 | 6 (Note: Appearances in CAF Champions League) | 2 | 3 (Note: 1 Appearance in CAF Super Cup, 1 Appearance in FIFA Club World Cup, 1 Appearance in Tunisian Super Cup) | 0 | 30 | 7 |
| EST | Total | | 83 | 23 | 11 | 2 | 25 | 6 | 8 | 2 | 127 | 33 |
| Abha | 2019–20 | Saudi Professional League | 29 | 12 | 2 | 1 | — | | 0 | 0 | 31 | 13 |
| Abha | 2020–21 | Saudi Professional League | 23 | 8 | 1 | 0 | — | | 0 | 0 | 24 | 8 |
| Abha | 2021–22 | Saudi Professional League | 27 | 7 | 1 | 0 | — | | 0 | 0 | 28 | 7 |
| Abha | 2022–23 | Saudi Professional League | 28 | 8 | 2 | 1 | — | | 0 | 0 | 30 | 9 |
| Abha | 2023–24 | Saudi Professional League | 27 | 3 | 1 | 0 | — | | 0 | 0 | 28 | 3 |
| Abha | Total | | 134 | 38 | 7 | 2 | — | | 0 | 0 | 141 | 40 |
| Career totals | | | 278 | 70 | 22 | 5 | 25 | 6 | 8 | 2 | 333 | 83 |

=== International ===
As of match played 18 December 2021

Appearances and goals by national team and year
| National team | Year | Apps | Goals |
|---|---|---|---|
| Tunisia | 2014 | 0 | 0 |
| Tunisia | 2015 | 3 | 3 |
| Tunisia | 2016 | 7 | 2 |
| Tunisia | 2017 | 1 | 0 |
| Tunisia | 2019 | 0 | 0 |
| Tunisia | 2020 | 1 | 0 |
| Tunisia | 2021 | 8 | 0 |
| Tunisia | 2022 | 0 | 0 |
| Total | | 20 | 5 |

Scores and results list Tunisia's goal tally first.

| No | Date | Venue | Opponent | Score | Result | Competition |
|---|---|---|---|---|---|---|
| 1. | 19 October 2015 | Stade Olympique de Radès, Radès, Tunisia | Libya | 1–0 | 1–0 | 2016 African Nations Championship qualification |
| 2. | 15 October 2015 | Stade Olympique de Radès, Radès, Tunisia | Morocco | 2–2 | 2–3 | 2016 African Nations Championship qualification |
| 3. | 17 November 2015 | Stade Olympique de Radès, Radès, Tunisia | Mauritania | 2–1 | 2–1 | 2018 FIFA World Cup qualification |
| 4. | 26 January 2016 | Stade Régional Nyamirambo, Kigali, Rwanda | Niger | 1–0 | 5–0 | 2016 African Nations Championship |
| 5. | 26 January 2016 | Stade Régional Nyamirambo, Kigali, Rwanda | Niger | 2–0 | 5–0 | 2016 African Nations Championship |

== Honours ==
Espérance de Tunis

- Tunisian Cup: 2015–16
- Tunisian Ligue Professionnelle 1: 2016–17, 2017–18, 2018–19
- CAF Champions League: 2018, 2018–19
- Tunisian Super Cup: 2018

Individual

- Saudi Professional League Player of the Month: November 2019, December 2019
