= Amir Omrani =

Tunisian association football player

Personal information
- Date of birth: 8 February 1989 (age 37)
- Place of birth: Gafsa, Tunisia
- Height: 1.74 m (5 ft 9 in)
- Position: Winger

Youth career
- 2007–2008: EGS Gafsa

Senior career*
Years	Team	Apps	(Gls)
2008–2012	Étoile du Sahel	5	(1)
2010–2011	→ EGS Gafsa (loan)	21	(6)
2013–2015	AS Marsa	54	(10)
2015–2016	Étoile du Sahel	14	(0)
2016–2017	AS Gabès	23	(3)
2017–2018	AS Marsa		
2018–2019	Al-Sadd		(13)
2019–2021	Al-Thoqbah		(26)
2021–2022	Al-Arabi	22	(9)
2022–2023	Al-Zulfi		

International career^{‡}
2011–	Tunisia	3	(0)
Medal record
EGS Gafsa
Runner-up	Ligue Professionnelle 1	2010–11
Runner-up	Tunisian Cup	2010–11
AS Marsa
Winner	Tunisian Cup	2014–15
Étoile du Sahel
Winner	Ligue Professionnelle 1	2015–16
- * Club domestic league appearances and goals as of 11:00, 18 July 2018 (UTC) ‡ National team caps and goals as of 11:00, 18 July 2018 (UTC)

Amir Omrani (Arabic: أمير العمراني; born 8 February 1989) is a Tunisian football player, currently playing for the Tunisia national team.

== Career ==
On 17 June 2022, Omrani joined Saudi Arabian club Al-Zulfi. On 7 January 2023, he was released by the club.

== International career ==
Omrani was called up to the Tunisia national team in 2015 and came on as a 90th-minute substitute for Taha Yassine Khenissi in a 1-1 draw with China.

== Career statistics ==
=== Club ===
As of 18 July 2018.

Club	Season	League			Cup		Continental		Other		Total	
Club	Season	Division	Apps	Goals	Apps	Goals	Apps	Goals	Apps	Goals	Apps	Goals
EGS Gafsa (loan)	2010–11	Ligue Professionnelle 1	21	6	0	0	–		0	0	21	6
Étoile du Sahel	2011–12	Ligue Professionnelle 1	4	1	0	0	–		0	0	4	1
Étoile du Sahel	2012–13	Ligue Professionnelle 1	1	0	0	0	1 (Note: Appearances in the CAF Champions League)	0	0	0	2	0
Étoile du Sahel	Total		5	1	0	0	1	0	0	0	6	1
AS Marsa	2012–13	Ligue Professionnelle 1	7	3	0	0	–		0	0	7	3
AS Marsa	2013–14	Ligue Professionnelle 1	20	3	0	0	–		0	0	20	3
AS Marsa	2014–15	Ligue Professionnelle 1	27	4	0	0	–		0	0	27	4
AS Marsa	Total		54	10	0	0	0	0	0	0	54	10
Étoile du Sahel	2015–16	Ligue Professionnelle 1	14	0	0	0	–		0	0	14	0
AS Gabès	2016–17	Ligue Professionnelle 1	21	3	0	0	–		0	0	21	3
AS Gabès	2017–18	Ligue Professionnelle 1	2	0	0	0	–		0	0	2	0
AS Gabès	Total		23	3	0	0	0	0	0	0	23	3
Career total			117	20	0	0	1	0	0	0	118	20

=== International ===
As of matches played 18 July 2018.

National team	Year	Apps	Goals
Tunisia	2011	2	0
Tunisia	2015	1	0
Total		3	0
