= 2015–16 Tunisian Ligue Professionnelle 1 =

Tunisian Ligue Professionnelle 1
- Season: 2015–16
- Dates: 12 September 2015 – 12 June 2016
- Champions: Étoile du Sahel (11th title)
- Relegated: El Gawafel de Gafsa; Avenir de Kasserine; Stade Tunisien
- Champions League: Étoile du Sahel; Espérance de Tunis
- Confederation Cup: Club Sfaxien; Club Africain
- Matches: 240
- Goals: 521 (2.17 per match)
- Top goalscorer: Maâloul (16 goals)
- Biggest home win: CSS 6–0 ASK
- Biggest away win: ASK 0–4 EST; JSK 0–4 EST
- Highest scoring: ESS 5–2 SG
- Longest winning run: 11 games (CSS)
- Longest unbeaten run: 29 games (ESS)
- Longest winless run: 14 games (ASK)
- Longest losing run: 5 games (EGSG)

The 2015–16 Tunisian Ligue Professionnelle 1 (Tunisian Professional League) season was the 61st season of top-tier football in Tunisia. The competition began on 12 September 2015 and ended on 12 June 2016. The defending champions from the previous season were Club Africain.

== Teams ==
A total of 16 teams contested the league, including 13 sides from the 2014–15 season and three promoted from the 2014–15 Ligue 2. Union de Ben Guerdane was the first to obtain promotion, followed by Avenir de Kasserine and finally Olympique Sidi Bouzid. The three teams replaced Union Monastirienne, Avenir de Gabès and Association de Djerba who were relegated to 2015–16 Tunisian Ligue 2. Club Africain were the defending champions from the 2014–15 season.

=== Stadiums and locations ===
Locations of the 2015–16 Ligue 1 teams

Team	Location	Stadium	Capacity	2014–15 season
Avenir de Kasserine	Kasserine	Stade de Kasserine	8,000	Ligue 2
Avenir de Marsa	Tunis	Stade Abdelaziz Chtioui	6,000	6th in Ligue 1
Club Africain	Tunis	Stade Olympique de Radès	60,000	Ligue 1 Champions
Club Bizertin	Bizerte	Stade 15 Octobre	20,000	8th in Ligue 1
Club de Hammam-Lif	Tunis	Stade Bou Kornine	8,000	11th in Ligue 1
Club Sfaxien	Sfax	Stade Taïeb Mhiri	22,000	4th in Ligue 1
El Gawafel de Gafsa	Gafsa	Stade de Gafsa	7,000	13th in Ligue 1
Étoile de Métlaoui	Métlaoui	Stade Municipal de Métlaoui	5,000	12th in Ligue 1
Étoile du Sahel	Sousse	Stade Olympique de Sousse	25,000	2nd in Ligue 1
Espérance de Tunis	Tunis	Stade Olympique de Radès	60,000	3rd in Ligue 1
Espérance de Zarzis	Zarzis	Stade Jlidi	7,000	5th in Ligue 1
Jeunesse Kairouanaise	Kairouan	Stade Ali Zouaoui	15,000	9th in Ligue 1
Olympique Sidi Bouzid	Sidi Bouzid	Stade du 17 Décembre	1,000	Ligue 2
Stade Gabèsien	Gabès	Stade Municipal de Gabès	10,000	10th in Ligue 1
Stade Tunisien	Tunis	Stade Chedly Zouiten	20,000	7th in Ligue 1
Union de Ben Guerdane	Ben Guerdane	Stade du 7 Mars	10,000	Ligue 2

== Results ==
=== League table ===
Pos	Team	Pld	W	D	L	GF	GA	GD	Pts	Qualification or relegation
1	Étoile du Sahel (C)	30	24	5	1	57	17	+40	77	2017 CAF Champions League
2	Espérance de Tunis	30	23	3	4	60	21	+39	72	2017 CAF Champions League and 2017 Arab Club Championship
3	Club Sfaxien	30	23	3	4	57	21	+36	72	2017 CAF Confederation Cup
4	Étoile de Métlaoui	30	15	4	11	36	26	+10	49	
5	Club Bizertin	30	11	8	11	21	21	0	41	
6	Club Africain	30	11	6	13	42	38	+4	39	2017 CAF Confederation Cup
7	Olympique Sidi Bouzid	30	11	4	15	25	38	−13	37	
8	Club de Hammam-Lif	30	10	6	14	27	32	−5	36	
9	Jeunesse Kairouanaise	30	10	6	14	27	37	−10	36	
10	Avenir de Marsa	30	9	7	14	25	35	−10	34	
11	Stade Gabèsien	30	8	9	13	28	35	−7	33	
12	Espérance de Zarzis	30	8	9	13	30	39	−9	33	
13	Union de Ben Guerdane	30	8	9	13	21	30	−9	33	
14	El Gawafel de Gafsa (R)	30	6	12	12	31	41	−10	30	2016–17 Ligue 2
15	Avenir de Kasserine (R)	30	5	8	17	17	49	−32	23	2016–17 Ligue 2
16	Stade Tunisien (R)	30	4	9	17	17	41	−24	18 (Note: Stade Tunisien was docked 3 points for refusing to play the last 3 games against Étoile de Métlaoui, Union de Ben Guerdane, and Club de Hammam-Lif)	2016–17 Ligue 2

Source: Ligue 1
Rules for classification: 1) points; 2) goal difference; 3) number of goals scored.
(C) Champions; (R) Relegated

=== Result table ===
Home \ Away	ASK	ASM	CA	CAB	CSHL	CSS	EGSG	ESM	ESS	EST	ESZ	JSK	OSB	SG	ST	USBG
Avenir de Kasserine		0–2 (Note: Awarded 0–2 because Avenir de Kasserine fielded an ineligible player. The original score was 3–1.)	1–1	0–2	0–0	0–3	1–1	1–2	0–1	0–4	1–1	1–0	0–1	3–2	0–0	1–0
Avenir de Marsa	2–0		2–3	1–0	1–0	0–1	2–2	0–0	0–3	3–1	2–0	0–2	0–1	0–2	1–0	1–0
Club Africain	2–0	1–0		0–1	3–1	2–3	2–1	0–2	1–2	0–2	1–1	5–0	1–0	1–1	4–0	2–1
CA Bizertin	1–0	1–0	0–0		3–0	0–1	1–1	3–2	0–2	1–3	1–1	2–0 (Note: Awarded 2–0 because Jeunesse Kairouanaise fielded an ineligible player. The original score was 1–1.)	0–1	1–0	1–0	0–0
Club de Hammam-Lif	2–0	1–1	2–2	0–0		2–1	2–0	0–1	0–1	0–1	3–1	1–0	1–0	1–1	2–0 (Note: Awarded 2–0 because Stade Tunisien was sanctioned with a forfeit for refusing to play the game.)	2–0
Club Sfaxien	6–0	3–0	3–1	1–0	2–1		3–1	3–1	1–1	1–0	2–0	1–0	3–1	2–1	3–1	1–0
El Gawafel de Gafsa	2–1	1–2	1–1	0–0	2–1	1–4		2–2	1–1	0–0	2–3	2–1	2–1	2–0	2–0	0–0
Étoile de Métlaoui	2–1	1–0	1–0	0–1	1–0	0–1	1–0		2–0	1–2	1–0	1–2	3–1	1–0	2–0 (Note: Awarded 2–0 because Stade Tunisien was sanctioned with a forfeit for refusing to play the game.)	0–1
Étoile du Sahel	1–0	3–0	1–0	2–1	2–0	3–1	2–1	1–0		3–0	1–0	2–1	1–0	5–2	4–1	4–0
Espérance de Tunis	5–0	1–0	2–1	2–0	2–1	2–1	3–0	1–0	2–2		1–2	2–1	5–1	2–0	4–1	2–1
Espérance de Zarzis	3–1	0–0	1–0	0–0	2–1	1–0	1–1	1–3	0–1	1–2		0–2 (Note: Awarded 0–2 because Espérance de Zarzis fielded an ineligible player. The original score was 0–0.)	0–2	3–3	3–1	2–1
Jeunesse Kairouanaise	1–2	3–1	2–1	0–1	1–1	2–2	1–0	1–0	1–3	0–4	1–0		1–1	0–0	0–1	0–0
Olympique Sidi Bouzid	0–0	3–2	2–0	2–0	0–1	0–1	2–1	0–4	1–2	0–2	1–0	0–2		0–3	0–0	1–0
Stade Gabèsien	0–1	1–1	1–3	0–0	2–0	0–2	1–0	0–0	1–1	0–1	2–2	0–1	1–0		1–0	2–1
Stade Tunisien	0–0	1–1	4–2	1–0	0–1	0–1	1–1	2–0	0–0	0–0	1–1	1–1	1–2	0–1		0–2 (Note: Awarded 0–2 because Stade Tunisien was sanctioned with a forfeit for refusing to play the game.)
Union de Ben Guerdane	2–2	0–0	0–2	1–0	2–0	0–0	1–1	2–2	0–2	0–2	1–0	2–0	1–1	1–0	1–0	

Source: Ligue 1
Legend: Blue = home team win; Yellow = draw; Red = away team win.
For upcoming matches, an "a" indicates there is an article about the rivalry between the two participants.

== Top goalscorers ==
Rank	Player	Club	Goals
1	(Tunisia) Ali Maâloul	Club Sfaxien	16
2	(Tunisia) Hamza Lahmar	Étoile du Sahel	12
2	(Tunisia) Taha Yassine Khenissi	Espérance de Tunis	12
2	(Benin) Jacques Bessan	El Gawafel de Gafsa	12
2	(Tunisia) Saad Bguir	Espérance de Tunis	12
6	(Nigeria) Junior Ajayi	Club Sfaxien	10
7	(Tunisia) Borhène Ghannèm	El Gawafel de Gafsa	9
7	(Chad) Ezechiel N'Douassel	Club Sfaxien	9
7	(Tunisia) Alaya Brigui	Étoile du Sahel	9
7	(Brazil) Diogo Acosta	Étoile du Sahel	9
11	(Tunisia) Fakhreddine Ben Youssef	Espérance de Tunis	8
11	(Tunisia) Hamza Messaadi	Espérance de Zarzis	8
11	(Tunisia) Ahmed Akaïchi	Étoile du Sahel	8

== See also ==
- 2015–16 Tunisian Ligue Professionnelle 2
- 2015–16 Tunisian Ligue Professionnelle 3
- 2015–16 Tunisian Cup
