= 2016–17 Tunisian Ligue Professionnelle 1 =

Tunisian Ligue Professionnelle 1
- Season: 2016–17
- Dates: 8 September 2016 – 18 May 2017
- Champions: Espérance de Tunis (27th title)
- Relegated: Avenir de Marsa; Club de Hammam-Lif; Union de Tataouine; Olympique Sidi Bouzid; Olympique Béja
- Champions League: Espérance de Tunis; Étoile du Sahel
- Confederation Cup: Club Africain; Union de Ben Guerdane
- Matches: 198
- Goals: 393 (1.98 per match)
- Top goalscorer: Taha Yassine Khenissi (14 goals)
- Biggest home win: CA 6–0 USBG
- Biggest away win: CSHL 1–4 CA; ESZ 1–4 CSHL
- Highest scoring: ASG 5–2 CSHL
- Longest winning run: 5 games (ESS, EST)
- Longest unbeaten run: 12 games (EST)
- Longest winless run: 13 games (USBG)
- Longest losing run: 6 games (ESZ)

The 2016–17 Tunisian Ligue Professionnelle 1 (Tunisian Professional League) season was the 62nd season of top-tier football in Tunisia. The competition started on 8 September 2016. The defending champions from the previous season were Étoile du Sahel.

Esperance de Tunis, the champions, drew the highest average home attendance of all clubs in the league with 11,000.

== Teams ==
A total of 16 teams contested the league, including 13 sides from the 2015–16 season and three promoted from the 2015–16 Ligue 2. Avenir de Gabès was the first to obtain promotion, followed by Olympique Béja and finally Union de Tataouine. The three teams replaced El Gawafel de Gafsa, Avenir de Kasserine and Stade Tunisien who were relegated to 2016–17 Tunisian Ligue 2.
The teams were drawn in two groups of 8 each. At the end of the first part of the season, the first 3 qualified to the Championship Group, the 4th to 7th contested the Relegation Group and the 8th of each group were relegated to the Ligue 2. Étoile du Sahel were the defending champions from the 2015–16 season.

=== Stadiums and locations ===
Locations of the 2016–17 Ligue 1 teams
Group A
Group B

Team	Location	Stadium	Capacity	2015–16 season
Avenir de Gabès	Gabès	Stade Municipal de Gabès	10,000	Ligue 2
Avenir de Marsa	Tunis	Stade Abdelaziz Chtioui	6,000	10th in Ligue 1
Club Africain	Tunis	Stade Olympique de Radès	60,000	6th in Ligue 1
Club Bizertin	Bizerte	Stade 15 Octobre	20,000	5th in Ligue 1
Club de Hammam-Lif	Tunis	Stade Bou Kornine	8,000	8th in Ligue 1
Club Sfaxien	Sfax	Stade Taïeb Mhiri	22,000	3rd in Ligue 1
Espérance de Tunis	Tunis	Stade Olympique de Radès	60,000	2nd in Ligue 1
Espérance de Zarzis	Zarzis	Stade Jlidi	7,000	13th in Ligue 1
Olympique Sidi Bouzid	Sidi Bouzid	Stade du 17 Décembre	1,000	7th in Ligue 1
Étoile de Métlaoui	Métlaoui	Stade Municipal de Métlaoui	5,000	4th in Ligue 1
Étoile du Sahel	Sousse	Stade Olympique de Sousse	28,000	Ligue 1 Champions
Jeunesse Kairouanaise	Kairouan	Stade Ali Zouaoui	15,000	9th in Ligue 1
Olympique Béja	Béja	Stade de Béja	15,000	Ligue 2
Stade Gabèsien	Gabès	Stade Municipal de Gabès	10,000	12th in Ligue 1
Union de Ben Guerdane	Ben Guerdane	Stade du 7 Mars	10,000	11th in Ligue 1
Union de Tataouine	Tataouine	Stade Nejib Khattab	5,000	Ligue 2

== First round ==
=== Group A ===
==== Table ====
Pos	Team	Pld	W	D	L	GF	GA	GD	Pts	Qualification or relegation
1	Club Sfaxien	14	9	3	2	18	5	+13	30	Qualification to the championship group
2	Étoile du Sahel	14	8	2	4	24	13	+11	26	Qualification to the championship group
3	Union de Ben Guerdane	14	6	6	2	11	6	+5	24	Qualification to the championship group
4	Club Bizertin	14	6	4	4	13	12	+1	22	Qualification to the relegation group
5	Espérance de Zarzis	14	3	6	5	9	14	−5	15	Qualification to the relegation group
6	Jeunesse Kairouanaise	14	3	3	8	10	18	−8	12	Qualification to the relegation group
7	Union de Tataouine	14	2	6	6	13	15	−2	12	Qualification to the relegation group
8	Olympique Sidi Bouzid (R)	14	3	2	9	8	23	−15	11	Relegation to the 2017–18 Ligue 2

Source: Ligue 1
Rules for classification: 1) points; 2) goal difference; 3) number of goals scored.
(R) Relegated

==== Results ====
Home \ Away	CAB	CSS	ESS	ESZ	JSK	OSB	USBG	UST
Club Bizertin		0–1	1–0	1–1	2–1	2–0	0–0	2–1
Club Sfaxien	2–0		1–1	2–1	3–0	3–0	2–1	2–0
Étoile du Sahel	5–1	1–0		3–0	2–0	4–2	1–0	2–1
Espérance de Zarzis	0–0	0–0	1–0		2–0	1–0	0–0	1–1
Jeunesse Kairouanaise	0–1	1–0	2–3	2–0		0–1	1–1	2–1
Olympique Sidi Bouzid	0–3	0–1	1–0	1–1	1–0		0–1	2–2
Union de Ben Guerdane	1–0	0–0	1–0	3–1	1–1	1–0		1–0
Union de Tataouine	0–0	0–1	2–2	1–0	0–0	4–0	0–0	

Source: Ligue 1
Legend: Blue = home team win; Yellow = draw; Red = away team win.
For upcoming matches, an "a" indicates there is an article about the rivalry between the two participants.

=== Group B ===
==== Table ====
Pos	Team	Pld	W	D	L	GF	GA	GD	Pts	Qualification or relegation
1	Espérance de Tunis	14	8	5	1	19	6	+13	29	Qualification to the championship group
2	Club Africain	14	8	3	3	21	10	+11	27	Qualification to the championship group
3	Étoile de Métlaoui	14	6	4	4	15	16	−1	22	Qualification to the championship group
4	Stade Gabèsien	14	4	6	4	14	14	0	18	Qualification to the relegation group
5	Avenir de Gabès	14	3	8	3	21	18	+3	17	Qualification to the relegation group
6	Avenir de Marsa	14	3	5	6	11	15	−4	14	Qualification to the relegation group
7	Club de Hammam-Lif	14	2	6	6	14	25	−11	12	Qualification to the relegation group
8	Olympique Béja (R)	14	1	5	8	14	25	−11	8	Relegation to the 2017–18 Ligue 2

Source: Ligue 1
Rules for classification: 1) points; 2) goal difference; 3) number of goals scored.
(R) Relegated

==== Results ====
Home \ Away	ASG	ASM	CA	CSHL	ESM	EST	OB	SG
Avenir de Gabès		0–0	1–1	5–2	1–1	1–1	2–0	2–2
Avenir de Marsa	2–2		1–0	2–0	0–1	0–2	3–2	0–0
Club Africain	2–1	2–1		2–0	1–2	1–0	3–0	0–1
Club de Hammam-Lif	1–3	1–1	1–4		2–2	1–1	1–0	0–0
Étoile de Métlaoui	2–1	1–0	0–2	2–1		0–1	2–1	0–0
Espérance de Tunis	2–0	0–0	1–1	0–0	3–0		2–1	2–1
Olympique Béja	1–1	2–1	1–1	1–1	2–2	0–2		3–3
Stade Gabèsien	1–1	2–0	0–1	2–3	1–0	0–2	1–0	

Source: Ligue 1
Legend: Blue = home team win; Yellow = draw; Red = away team win.
For upcoming matches, an "a" indicates there is an article about the rivalry between the two participants.

== Playoffs ==
=== Championship Group ===
==== Table ====
Pos	Team	Pld	W	D	L	GF	GA	GD	Pts	Qualification
1	Espérance de Tunis (C)	10	8	2	0	18	2	+16	26	2018 CAF Champions League
2	Étoile du Sahel	10	7	1	2	16	9	+7	22	2018 CAF Champions League
3	Club Africain	10	5	1	4	17	11	+6	16	2018 CAF Confederation Cup
4	Club Sfaxien	10	3	3	4	11	10	+1	12	
5	Étoile de Métlaoui	10	3	0	7	8	18	−10	9	
6	Union de Ben Guerdane	10	0	1	9	0	20	−20	1	2018 CAF Confederation Cup

Source: Ligue 1
Rules for classification: 1) points; 2) goal difference; 3) number of goals scored.
(C) Champions

==== Results ====
Home \ Away	CA	CSS	ESM	ESS	EST	USBG
Club Africain		2–1	2–0	1–2	0–2	6–0
Club Sfaxien	1–1		3–0	3–2	0–0	2–0
Étoile de Métlaoui	1–2	3–1		0–1	0–2	2–0
Étoile du Sahel	2–0	1–0	4–1		1–1	2–0
Espérance de Tunis	2–1	1–0	3–0	3–0		2–0
Union de Ben Guerdane	0–2	0–0	0–1	0–1	0–2	

Source: Ligue 1
Legend: Blue = home team win; Yellow = draw; Red = away team win.
For upcoming matches, an "a" indicates there is an article about the rivalry between the two participants.

=== Relegation Group ===
==== Table ====
Pos	Team	Pld	W	D	L	GF	GA	GD	Pts	Qualification
1	Stade Gabèsien	14	6	5	3	12	7	+5	23	
2	Avenir de Gabès	14	5	7	2	12	7	+5	22	
3	Club Bizertin	14	4	7	3	12	10	+2	19	
4	Jeunesse Kairouanaise	14	4	6	4	8	7	+1	18	
5	Espérance de Zarzis	14	5	3	6	10	14	−4	18	
6	Avenir de Marsa	14	4	6	4	13	11	+2	18	Qualification to the Relegation Playoff
7	Club de Hammam-Lif (R)	14	4	4	6	12	13	−1	16	Relegation to the 2017–18 Ligue 2
8	Union de Tataouine (R)	14	2	6	6	9	19	−10	12	Relegation to the 2017–18 Ligue 2

Source: Ligue 1
Rules for classification: 1) points; 2) goal difference; 3) number of goals scored.
(R) Relegated

==== Results ====
Home \ Away	ASG	ASM	CAB	CSHL	ESZ	JSK	SG	UST
Avenir de Gabès		0–2	0–0	1–0	1–0	0–0	0–0	4–0
Avenir de Marsa	0–0		1–1	2–2	2–0	0–1	0–1	2–0
Club Bizertin	2–3	1–1		1–0	0–0	1–1	2–1	2–0
Club de Hammam-Lif	0–0	0–1	1–0		0–0	2–1	1–0	2–2
Espérance de Zarzis	1–0	3–2	0–1	1–4		0–0	1–0	1–0
Jeunesse Kairouanaise	0–1	2–0	0–0	1–0	1–0		0–0	1–1
Stade Gabèsien	1–1	0–0	1–0	2–0	2–1	1–0		1–1
Union de Tataouine	1–1	0–0	1–1	1–0	1–2	1–0	0–2	

Source: Ligue 1
Legend: Blue = home team win; Yellow = draw; Red = away team win.
For upcoming matches, an "a" indicates there is an article about the rivalry between the two participants.

== Top goalscorers ==
Rank	Player	Club	Goals
1	(Tunisia) Taha Yassine Khenissi	Espérance de Tunis	14
2	(Algeria) Ibrahim Chenihi	Club Africain	9
2	(Tunisia) Hamza Lahmar	Étoile du Sahel	9

== Relegation playoff ==
This game was played between the 6th of the Relegation Group and the 3rd of Ligue 2.

3 June 2017
15:30

Avenir de Marsa	0–2	Olympique Médenine

Stade Ali Zouaoui, Kairouan

== See also ==
- 2016–17 Tunisian Ligue Professionnelle 2
- 2016–17 Tunisian Ligue Professionnelle 3
- 2016–17 Tunisian Cup
