= 2018–19 Tunisian Ligue Professionnelle 1 =

Tunisian Ligue Professionnelle 1
- Season: 2018–19
- Dates: 18 August 2018 – 15 June 2019
- Champions: Espérance de Tunis (29th title)
- Relegated: Stade Gabèsien; Avenir de Gabès
- Champions League: Espérance de Tunis; Étoile du Sahel
- Confederation Cup: Club Sfaxien; Union de Ben Guerdane
- Matches: 182
- Goals: 377 (2.07 per match)
- Top goalscorer: Taha Yassine Khenissi; Firas Chaouat (10 goals each)
- Biggest home win: USM 4–0 UST; EST 4–0 JSK
- Biggest away win: CA 1–4 ST
- Highest scoring: ESS 5–3 USM
- Longest winning run: 6 games (CSS, EST)
- Longest unbeaten run: 19 games (EST)
- Longest winless run: 11 games (USM)
- Longest losing run: 7 games (CAB)

The 2018–19 Tunisian Ligue Professionnelle 1 (Tunisian Professional League) season was the 64rd season of top-tier football in Tunisia.
The defending champions from the previous season are Espérance de Tunis. The competition began on 18 August.

== Teams ==
A total of 14 teams contested the league.

=== Stadiums and locations ===
Locations of the 2018–19 Ligue 1 teams

Team	Location	Stadium	Capacity	2017–18 season
Avenir de Gabès	Gabès	Stade Municipal de Gabès	10,000	10th in Ligue 1
Club Africain	Tunis	Stade Olympique de Radès	60,000	2nd in Ligue 1
Club Bizertin	Bizerte	Stade 15 Octobre	20,000	5th in Ligue 1
Club de Hammam-Lif	Tunis	Stade Bou Kornine	8,000	Ligue 2
Club Sfaxien	Sfax	Stade Taïeb Mhiri	22,000	4th in Ligue 1
Étoile de Métlaoui	Métlaoui	Stade Municipal de Métlaoui	5,000	7th in Ligue 1
Étoile du Sahel	Sousse	Stade Olympique de Sousse	25,000	3rd in Ligue 1
Espérance de Tunis	Tunis	Stade Olympique de Radès	60,000	Ligue 1 Champions
Jeunesse Kairouanaise	Kairouan	Stade Ali Zouaoui	15,000	8th in Ligue 1
Stade Gabèsien	Gabès	Stade Municipal de Gabès	10,000	11th in Ligue 1
Stade Tunisien	Tunis	Stade Chedly Zouiten	20,000	9th in Ligue 1
Union de Ben Guerdane	Ben Guerdane	Stade du 7 Mars	10,000	12th in Ligue 1
Union Monastirienne	Monastir	Stade Mustapha Ben Jannet	20,000	6th in Ligue 1
Union de Tataouine	Tataouine	Stade Nejib Khattab	5,000	Ligue 2

== League table ==
Pos	Team	Pld	W	D	L	GF	GA	GD	Pts	Qualification or relegation
1	Espérance de Tunis (C)	26	17	5	4	37	15	+22	56	Qualification for Champions League
2	Étoile du Sahel	26	15	9	2	40	17	+23	54	Qualification for Champions League
3	Club Sfaxien	26	14	10	2	34	15	+19	52	Qualification for Confederation Cup (Note: Étoile du Sahel and CS Sfaxien are Tunisian Cup finalists.)
4	Union de Ben Guerdane	26	10	8	8	22	21	+1	38	Qualification for Confederation Cup
5	Club Africain	26	11	4	11	22	24	−2	37	
6	Club Bizertin	26	10	8	8	31	27	+4	35 (Note: Club Bizertin were deducted 3 points.)	
7	Union Monastirienne	26	8	7	11	30	30	0	31 (Note: Head-to-head: Union Monastirienne: 4 points; Union de Tataouine: 1 point.)	
8	Union de Tataouine	26	7	10	9	30	39	−9	31	
9	Étoile de Métlaoui	26	7	9	10	22	26	−4	30	
10	Stade Tunisien	26	7	7	12	27	36	−9	28	
11	Jeunesse Kairouanaise	26	6	8	12	20	32	−12	26	
12	Club de Hammam-Lif	26	5	10	11	17	23	−6	25	
13	Stade Gabèsien (R)	26	6	8	12	22	30	−8	23 (Note: Stade Gabèsien were deducted 3 points.)	Relegation to Ligue 2
14	Avenir de Gabès (R)	26	4	7	15	23	42	−19	19	Relegation to Ligue 2

Source: Ligue 1
Rules for classification: 1) Points; 2) Head-to-head points; 3) Head-to-head goal difference; 4) Goal difference; 5) Goals scored; 6) Fair-play points; 7) Play-off.
(C) Champions; (R) Relegated

== Results ==
Home \ Away	ASG	CA	CAB	CSHL	CSS	ESM	ESS	EST	JSK	SG	ST	USBG	USM	UST
Avenir de Gabès	—	2–0	0–2	0–0	1–2	2–1	3–1	0–1	3–3	0–2	1–1	2–1	0–0	1–1
Club Africain	2–1	—	0–2	1–0	0–1	3–1	0–1	2–1	1–0	1–0	1–4	0–1	1–0	2–0
Club Bizertin	1–0	1–2	—	3–2	1–1	1–1	0–1	2–2	1–0	2–1	2–0	1–0	3–1	1–2
Club de Hammam-Lif	1–1	0–0	1–0	—	0–0	1–1	0–1	0–2	1–1	1–0	3–1	1–0	0–1	1–2
Club Sfaxien	3–0	2–0	1–1	0–0	—	2–0	0–0	2–0	1–0	1–0	3–1	2–0	0–3	2–1
Étoile de Métlaoui	1–0	1–0	1–1	1–1	0–2	—	0–0	1–2	1–0	0–1	1–2	1–0	2–0	3–1
Étoile du Sahel	3–0	2–0	1–1	2–1	1–1	1–0	—	0–0	3–0	2–1	4–1	0–0	5–3	3–1
Espérance de Tunis	3–0	2–1	1–2	1–0	2–1	1–1	0–0	—	4–0	2–0	1–1	2–0	1–0	2–0
Jeunesse Kairouanaise	2–1	0–2	1–0	0–0	1–1	0–0	0–2	0–2	—	1–1	1–0	2–0	1–2	0–1
Stade Gabèsien	1–1	1–0	1–1	1–1	1–3	0–0	2–2	0–1	0–2	—	2–1	0–2	0–0	4–3
Stade Tunisien	3–1	0–0	3–0	1–0	0–0	1–1	0–1 (Note: Match stopped after 42 minutes. The score was 1–0 for Étoile du Sahel.)	1–2	1–2	1–0	—	0–3	0–2	0–0
Union de Ben Guerdane	2–1	1–1	1–0	1–0	1–1	1–0	0–2	1–0	1–0	0–0	1–0	—	1–1	2–2
Union Monastirienne	3–1	0–0	2–1	1–2	0–1	0–2 (Note: Match abandoned after 45 minutes. The original score was 1–0 for Étoile de Métlaoui.)	3–1	0–1	1–1	0–2	1–2	1–1	—	4–0
Union de Tataouine	2–1	0–2	1–1	1–0	1–1	3–1	0–0	0–1	2–2	2–1	2–2	1–1	1–1	—

Source: Ligue 1
Legend: Blue = home team win; Yellow = draw; Red = away team win.
For upcoming matches, an "a" indicates there is an article about the rivalry between the two participants.

== Season statistics ==
=== Top scorers ===
Rank	Goalscorer	Club	Goals
1	(Tunisia) Taha Yassine Khenissi	Espérance de Tunis	10
1	(Tunisia) Firas Chaouat	Club Sfaxien	10
3	(Tunisia) Yassine Chamakhi	Club Africain	9
3	(Mauritania) Ismaël Diakité	Union de Tataouine	9
5	(Tunisia) Rafik Kabou	Union Monastirienne	7

== See also ==
- 2018–19 Tunisian Ligue Professionnelle 2
- 2018–19 Tunisian Cup
- 2019 Tunisian Super Cup
