= 2017–18 Tunisian Cup =

2017–18 Coupe de Tunisie
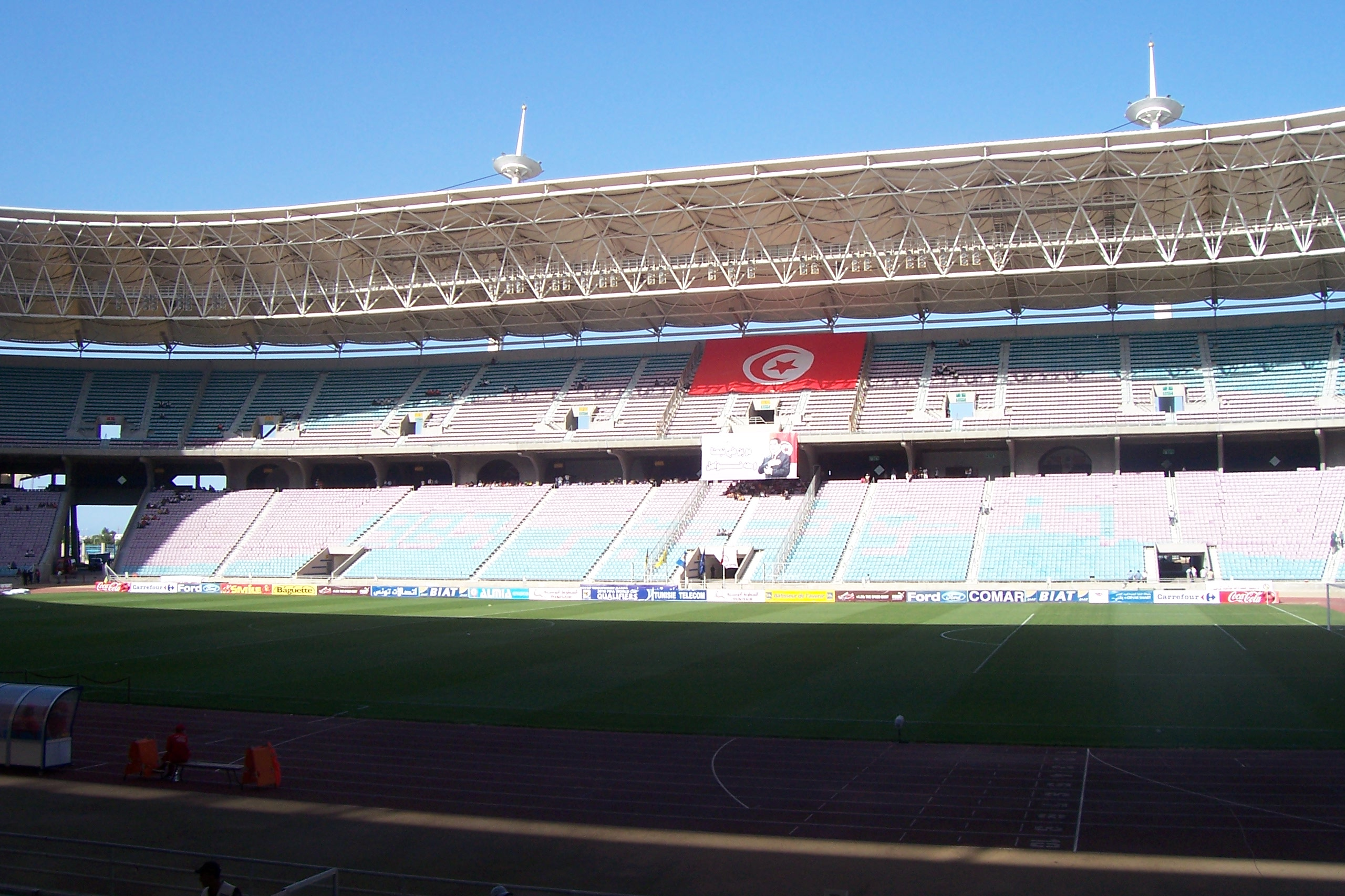
- Stade Olympique de Radès hosted the final

Tournament details
- Country: Tunisia

Final positions
- Champions: Club Africain
- Runners-up: Étoile du Sahel

The 2017–18 Tunisian Cup (Coupe de Tunisie) was the 86th season of the football cup competition of Tunisia. The competition was organized by the Fédération Tunisienne de Football (FTF) and open to all clubs in Tunisia.

== Preliminary rounds ==
Results:

== Round of 32 ==
The draw for the round of 32 and round of 16 was held on 13 December 2017.

4 February 2018	Croissant d'Akouda	2–3	Union Monastirienne
12:30	Mohamed Ali Hsan 13'; Hamdi Hamidi 38'		43' (pen.) 78' (pen.) Houcine Messaadi; 65' Slim Guesmi

4 February 2018	Union de Ben Guerdane	0–4	Club Sfaxien
12:30			30' 60' Kingsley Eduwo; 69' 84'Houssem Louati

4 February 2018	Union de Tataouine	2–2 (a.e.t.) (4–2 p)	Croissant de Redeyef
12:30	Oussema Boubakri 31'; Naoufel Yousfi 38' (pen.)		Chakib Derouiche
	Penalties
	Omrani (penalty scored); Mehamedi (penalty scored); Zaghdoud (penalty scored); Messai (penalty missed) (penalty scored)		(penalty missed) Derouiche; (penalty missed) Hammada; (penalty scored) Baadech (penalty scored)

4 February 2018	Astre de Menzel Nour	2–3	Olympique Médenine
12:30	Nejmeddine Arbi 48' 57'		30' Fedi Felhi; 55' Wajdi Mejribr; 82' (pen.) Aziz Chetrioui

4 February 2018	El Alia Sports	0–1	Étoile du Sahel
14:00			5' Chermiti

4 February 2018	Club de Bembla	2–1	Club des Cheminots
12:30	Aymen Souayeh 13'; Wael Ben Othmene 93' (pen.)		58' Oussema Zouabi

4 February 2018	Sporting Moknine	1–0	Espérance de Zarzis
12:30	Issam Jabeur 75' (pen.)

4 February 2018	Étoile Aloui	2–2 (a.e.t.) (5–4 p)	Stade Gabèsien
12:45	Montassar Tiwani 45'; Hafedh Aloui 65'		8' Khaldoun Mansour; 24' (pen.) Mohamed Amine Nefzi
	Penalties
	Dhebaibi (penalty scored); Chamseddine Mahmoudi (penalty scored); Hakim Fajjari (penalty scored); Montassar Diwali (penalty scored) (penalty scored)		(penalty scored) Amine Nefzi; (penalty scored) Akrem Ben Sassi; (penalty scored) Mondher Guesmi; (penalty scored) Bassem Rhouma (penalty missed)

4 February 2018	Union de Chebika	1–4	Club Africain
14:00	Atef Zairi 61'		1' Ghazi Ayadi; 8' (pen.) Belaïd; 19' Ali Abdi; 76' (pen.) Fakhreddine Jaziri

4 February 2018	Avenir de Sbikha	1–0	Jeunesse Kairouanaise
12:30	Karim Turki 23'

4 February 2018	Avenir de Rejiche	2–1	Croissant Chebbien
12:30	Yassine Bouchaala 42' 62'		35' Amine Waili

4 February 2018	Étoile de Métlaoui	1–0 (a.e.t.)	Espérance de Tunis
12:30	Idrissa Niang 118'

4 February 2018	Jeunesse de Tebourba	0–4	Stade Tunisien
12:30			25' (pen.) 57' Slim Jedaied; 29' Ahmed Hosni; 82' Youssef Trabelsi

4 February 2018	Palme de Tozeur	0–0 (a.e.t.) (3–4 p)	Club Bizertin
12:30
	Penalties
	Wajdi Deb (penalty scored); Regai (penalty scored); Zaied (penalty scored); Ghali (penalty missed); Sahraoui (penalty missed); Hmida (penalty missed); Ghali (penalty missed)		(penalty scored) Firas Belarbi; (penalty missed) Yaken; (penalty scored) Ben Nsib; (penalty missed) Bousnina; (penalty scored) Mejri; (penalty missed) Ressaissi; (penalty scored) Yaken

4 February 2018	Avenir de Gabès	2–0	Sfax Railways Sports
12:30	Lamjed Ameur 90+4'; Slim Mezlini 90+5'

4 February 2018	Espoir de Hammam Sousse	1–2	Olympique des Transports
12:30	Mehdi Ben Dhifallah 63'		20' Issam Dridi; 27' Ibrahim Kallel

== Round of 16 ==
24 February 2018	Avenir de Sbikha	1–3 (a.e.t.)	Club Africain
13:30	Turki 110' (pen.)		99' (pen.) Belaïd; 107' Agrebi; 120+1' (pen.) Chammakhi

24 February 2018	Union Monastirienne	0–1	Club Sfaxien
14:00			90+1' Marzouki

25 February 2018	Union de Tataouine	2–1 (a.e.t.)	Olympique Médenine
12:00	Jertila 26'; Touati 114'		80' Mejri

25 February 2018	Olympique des Transports	0–1	Avenir de Gabès
12:30			17' Agrebi

25 February 2018	Sporting Moknine	1–1 (a.e.t.) (3–4 p)	Étoile Alouienne
12:30	Akremi 18'		36' Messaoudi
	Penalties
	Hatem (penalty missed); Triki (penalty missed); Akremi (penalty scored); Nassef (penalty scored); Souayah (penalty missed); Aloulou (penalty scored); Chabba (penalty missed)		(penalty scored) Dhebabi; (penalty missed) Fajjari; (penalty scored) Mahmoudi; (penalty missed) Dhibi; (penalty missed) Aissaoui; (penalty scored) Ben Sassi; (penalty scored) Haddadi

25 February 2018	Avenir de Rejiche	1–0	Étoile de Métlaoui
12:30	Sioud 61'

25 February 2018	Stade Tunisien	0–0 (a.e.t.) (2–4 p)	Club Bizertin
14:00
	Penalties
	Bessan (penalty missed); Mhadhbi (penalty missed); Jeridi (penalty scored); Hammami (penalty scored)		(penalty missed) Yaken; (penalty scored) Jelassi; (penalty scored) Ressaissi; (penalty scored) Amdouni; (penalty scored) Bousnina

24 February 2018	Club de Bembla	0–2	Étoile du Sahel
14:15			2' Sfaxi; 25'Ben Belgacem

== Quarter-finals ==
4 April 2018	Union de Tataouine	0–0 (a.e.t.) (3–4 p)	Club Bizertin
12:30
	Penalties
	Yousfi (penalty missed); Mhamdi (penalty scored); Ben Aziza (penalty scored); Khalfa (penalty missed); Touati (penalty scored)		(penalty scored) Yaken; (penalty scored) Jelassi; (penalty scored) Ressaissi; (penalty missed) Amdouni; (penalty scored) Bousnina

4 April 2018	Club Africain	2–1	Club Sfaxien
14:00	Khalifa 3'; Ayadi 53'		82' Hannachi

4 April 2018	Étoile Alouienne	0–3	Avenir de Gabès
14:00			42' Jerbi; 55' Ameur; 85' Chaouech

4 April 2018	Avenir de Rejiche	0–5	Étoile du Sahel
14:30			44' Kechrida; 55' 61' Ben Ouannes; 67' (pen.) Lahmar; 83' Ben Belgacem

== Semi-finals ==
The games were played on 22 April 2018.

22 April 2018	Étoile du Sahel	1–0	Avenir de Gabès
14:00	Chermiti 62'

22 April 2018	Club Bizertin	1–1 (a.e.t.) (4–5 p)	Club Africain
14:00	Bousnina 47'		21' Belaïd
	Penalties
	Jelassi (penalty scored); Ounalli (penalty scored); Ressaissi (penalty scored); Mejri (penalty missed); Bousnina (penalty scored); Habbassi (penalty missed)		(penalty missed) Ouedherfi; (penalty scored) Dhaouadi; (penalty scored) Chammakhi; (penalty scored) Tka; (penalty scored) Ben Yahia; (penalty scored) Agrebi

== Final ==
The final match was played on 13 May 2018.

13 May 2018	Club Africain	4–1	Étoile du Sahel	Stade Olympique de Radès, Tunis
15:30	Ben Yahia 37'; Khalifa 51', 90+4'; Ayadi 65'		81' Bedoui	Referee: Youssef Essrayri

== See also ==
- 2017–18 Tunisian Ligue Professionnelle 1
- 2017–18 Tunisian Ligue Professionnelle 2
- 2017–18 Tunisian Super Cup
