= 2018–19 Tunisian Ligue Professionnelle 2 =

Tunisian Ligue Professionnelle 2
- Season: 2018–19
- Matches played: 264
- Goals scored: 621 (2.35 per match)
- Biggest home win: US Siliana 7–1 AS Oued Ellil
- Biggest away win: ESHS 0–3 CS Chebba
- Highest scoring: US Siliana 7–1 AS Oued Ellil

The 2018–19 Tunisian Ligue Professionnelle 2 (Tunisian Professional League) is the 64th season since Tunisia's independence.

== Teams ==
=== Group A ===
- AS Ariana
- AS Djerba
- AS Marsa
- AS Oued Ellil
- AS Soliman
- CO Médenine
- CS Korba
- ES Zarzis
- ES Jerba
- Olympique Béja
- Sfax Railway Sports
- US Siliana

=== Group B ===
- AS Kasserine
- CS Jbeniana
- CS Chebba
- EGS Gafsa
- ES Hammam-Sousse
- EO Sidi Bouzid
- ES Radès
- Jendouba Sport
- Océano Club de Kerkennah
- Sporting Ben Arous
- Stade Africain Menzel Bourguiba
- Stade Sportif Sfaxien

Locations of the 2018–19 Ligue 2 teams
Locations of the 2018–19 Ligue 2 teams
Group A
Group B

== Results ==
=== Group A ===
==== Table ====
Pos	Team	Pld	W	D	L	GF	GA	GD	Pts	Promotion or relegation
1	AS Soliman	22	13	7	2	40	23	+17	46	Promotion to 2019–20 Ligue 1
2	AS Marsa	22	12	7	3	27	10	+17	43	
3	Olympique Béja	22	13	3	6	30	18	+12	42	
4	ES Zarzis	22	11	5	6	26	20	+6	38	
5	CO Médenine	22	8	4	10	22	30	−8	28	
6	ES Jerba	22	7	6	9	23	28	−5	27	
7	Sfax Railway Sports	22	6	7	9	27	30	−3	25	
8	AS Djerba	22	5	8	9	24	24	0	23	
9	AS Oued Ellil	22	6	5	11	34	43	−9	23	
10	AS Ariana (R)	22	5	8	9	19	30	−11	23	Relegation to Tunisian Ligue Professionnelle 3
11	US Siliana (R)	22	5	6	11	29	31	−2	21	Relegation to Tunisian Ligue Professionnelle 3
12	CS Korba (R)	22	4	8	10	21	28	−7	20	Relegation to Tunisian Ligue Professionnelle 3

Updated to match(es) played on 3 May 2019. Source: Ligue 2 Group A
Rules for classification: 1) points; 2) goal difference; 3) number of goals scored.
(R) Relegated

==== Result table ====
Home \ Away	ASA	ASD	ASM	ASOE	ASS	COM	CSK	ESZ	ESJ	OB	SRS	USS
AS Ariana	—	1–0	1–1	1–1	1–3	0–0	2–2	1–0	0–0	1–0	1–1	2–1
AS Djerba		—	1–2	3–3		1–1	1–1					
AS Marsa			—					2–0	2–1		1–1	1–0
AS Oued Ellil			2–0	—	0–1		3–2		1–1	2–3	1–0	
AS Soliman	1–1	0–0	2–2		—	3–0		2–2				
CO Médenine			1–2	2–1		—				1–0	2–0	2–1
CS Korba	1–1		1–2		0–0	0–0	—			2–1	1–1	
ES Zarzis		2–0		2–1		1–0	2–1	—		2–1	3–2	
ES Jerba	1–0	1–0			1–1	3–2	1–0	1–2	—			0–0
Olympique Béja		2–0	1–0		4–2				2–1	—		1–0
Sfax Railway Sports	4–1	1–0			2–3				2–0	0–2	—	1–2
US Siliana	3–0	1–0		7–1	0–1		2–2	1–1				—

Updated to match(es) played on 16 December 2018. Source: Ligue 2 Group A
Legend: Blue = home team win; Yellow = draw; Red = away team win.
For upcoming matches, an "a" indicates there is an article about the rivalry between the two participants.

=== Group B ===
==== Table ====
Pos	Team	Pld	W	D	L	GF	GA	GD	Pts	Promotion or relegation
1	CS Chebba	22	18	4	0	40	8	+32	58	Promotion to 2019–20 Ligue 1
2	Stade Africain Menzel Bourguiba	22	11	6	5	25	17	+8	39	
3	EGS Gafsa	22	12	1	9	39	25	+14	37	
4	Stade Sportif Sfaxien	22	7	11	4	27	22	+5	32	
5	AS Kasserine	22	9	5	8	24	22	+2	32	
6	Jendouba Sport	22	7	6	9	24	23	+1	27	
7	ES Hammam-Sousse	22	8	3	11	19	24	−5	27	
8	ES Radès	22	8	2	12	30	34	−4	26	
9	Sporting Ben Arous	22	6	8	8	16	22	−6	26	
10	EO Sidi Bouzid	22	6	6	10	21	38	−17	24	
11	CS Jbeniana	22	6	4	12	20	34	−14	22	Relegation to Tunisian Ligue Professionnelle 3
12	Océano Club de Kerkennah	22	5	2	15	12	28	−16	17	Relegation to Tunisian Ligue Professionnelle 3

Updated to match(es) played on 21 April 2019. Source: Ligue 2 Group B
Rules for classification: 1) points; 2) goal difference; 3) number of goals scored.

==== Result table ====
Home \ Away	ASK	CSJ	CSC	EGSG	ESHS	EOSB	ESR	JS	OCK	SBA	SAMB	SSS
AS Kasserine	—				2–1	4–0		1–1	2–1		0–0	1–0
CS Jbeniana	0–1	—		0–1			2–1	2–1	1–2		1–2	
CS Chebba	1–0	1–0	—	1–0		2–0	2–1	2–0			3–0	
EGS Gafsa	2–0			—	1–0	5–2		2–2			0–1	
ES Hammam-Sousse		2–3	0–3		—			2–1		0–0		
EO Sidi Bouzid		2–0			1–0	—			1–0	1–1		1–1
ESR	0–1			1–0	2–1	3–0	—			4–1		1–1
Jendouba Sport						2–0	1–2	—	3–0	2–0	0–0	0–0
Océano Club de Kerkennah			0–2	1–3	1–1		0–1		—	1–0		1–2
Sporting Ben Arous	0–0	1–0	1–1	0–1						—	0–1	0–0
Stade Africain Menzel Bourguiba					2–3	1–0	2–1		1–0		—	
Stade Sportif Sfaxien		1–1	1–1	3–0	2–1						1–1	—

Updated to match(es) played on 16 December 2018. Source: Ligue 2 Group B
Legend: Blue = home team win; Yellow = draw; Red = away team win.
For upcoming matches, an "a" indicates there is an article about the rivalry between the two participants.

== See also ==
- 2018–19 Tunisian Ligue Professionnelle 1
- 2018–19 Tunisian Cup
