= 2017–18 Tunisian Ligue Professionnelle 1 =

Tunisian Ligue Professionnelle 1
- Season: 2017–18
- Dates: 15 August 2017 – 10 May 2018
- Champions: Espérance de Tunis (28th title)
- Relegated: Espérance de Zarzis; Olympique Médenine
- Champions League: Espérance de Tunis; Club Africain
- Confederation Cup: Étoile du Sahel; Club Sfaxien
- Matches: 182
- Goals: 387 (2.13 per match)
- Top goalscorer: Alaeddine Marzouki; Lassaad Jaziri (10 goals each)
- Biggest home win: ASG 5–1 ESM; CA 5–1 ESM
- Biggest away win: COM 0–5 CSS
- Highest scoring: ASG 5–1 ESM; ST 4–2 ESM; CA 5–1 ESM
- Longest winning run: 7 games (CA)
- Longest unbeaten run: 18 games (EST)
- Longest winless run: 14 games (ESZ)
- Longest losing run: 10 games (USBG)

The 2017–18 Tunisian Ligue Professionnelle 1 (Tunisian Professional League) season was the 63rd season of top-tier football in Tunisia. The season calendar was drawn on July 24. The competition started on August 15.

== Teams ==
A total of 14 teams contested the league, including 11 sides from the 2016–17 season and three promoted from the 2016–17 Ligue 2. Union Monastirienne and Stade Tunisien obtained promotion after winning their penultimate game of the season, while Olympique Médenine won the promotion playoff against Avenir de Marsa. The three teams replaced the five teams that were relegated to 2017–18 Tunisian Ligue 2 in order to reduce the number of teams from 16 to 14.

=== Stadiums and locations ===
Locations of the 2017–18 Ligue 1 teams

Team	Location	Stadium	Capacity	2016–17 season
Avenir de Gabès	Gabès	Stade Municipal de Gabès	10,000	8th in Ligue 1
Club Africain	Tunis	Stade Olympique de Radès	60,000	3rd in Ligue 1
Club Bizertin	Bizerte	Stade 15 Octobre	20,000	9th in Ligue 1
Olympique Médenine	Médenine	Salaheddine Ben Hamida Stadium	6,000	Ligue 2
Club Sfaxien	Sfax	Stade Taïeb Mhiri	22,000	4th in Ligue 1
Étoile de Métlaoui	Métlaoui	Stade Municipal de Métlaoui	5,000	5th in Ligue 1
Étoile du Sahel	Sousse	Stade Olympique de Sousse	25,000	2nd in Ligue 1
Espérance de Tunis	Tunis	Stade Olympique de Radès	60,000	Ligue 1 Champions
Espérance de Zarzis	Zarzis	Stade Jlidi	7,000	11th in Ligue 1
Jeunesse Kairouanaise	Kairouan	Stade Ali Zouaoui	15,000	10th in Ligue 1
Stade Gabèsien	Gabès	Stade Municipal de Gabès	10,000	7th in Ligue 1
Stade Tunisien	Tunis	Stade Chedly Zouiten	20,000	Ligue 2
Union de Ben Guerdane	Ben Guerdane	Stade du 7 Mars	10,000	6th in Ligue 1
Union Monastirienne	Monastir	Stade Mustapha Ben Jannet	20,000	Ligue 2

== Results ==
=== League table ===
Pos	Team	Pld	W	D	L	GF	GA	GD	Pts	Qualification or relegation
1	Espérance de Tunis (C)	26	17	7	2	45	19	+26	58	Qualification for Champions League
2	Club Africain	26	14	5	7	36	21	+15	47 (Note: Head-to-head: Club Africain are ahead on head-to-head record: Club Africain 1–0 Étoile du Sahel (week 8), Étoile du Sahel 0–1 Club Africain (week 21))	Qualification for Champions League
3	Étoile du Sahel	26	14	5	7	38	17	+21	47	Qualification for Confederation Cup
4	Club Sfaxien	26	13	7	6	37	18	+19	46	Qualification for Confederation Cup
5	Club Bizertin	26	14	1	11	40	32	+8	37 (Note: Club Bizertin were deducted 6 points by FIFA for not paying a former player.)	
6	Union Monastirienne	26	9	9	8	25	21	+4	36	
7	Étoile de Métlaoui	26	9	7	10	30	35	−5	34	
8	Jeunesse Kairouanaise	26	9	5	12	20	32	−12	32	
9	Stade Tunisien	26	8	7	11	29	36	−7	31	
10	Avenir de Gabès	26	7	8	11	25	32	−7	29	
11	Stade Gabèsien	26	6	10	10	15	21	−6	28	
12	Union de Ben Guerdane	26	7	5	14	22	34	−12	26	Relegation play-off to Ligue 2
13	Espérance de Zarzis (R)	26	5	11	10	13	26	−13	26	Relegation to Ligue 2
14	Olympique Médenine (R)	26	4	5	17	12	43	−31	17	Relegation to Ligue 2

Source: Ligue 1
Rules for classification: 1) points; 2) head-to-head points; 3) head-to-head goal difference; 4) goal difference; 5) total goals; 6) fairplay ranking; 7) playoff.
(C) Champions; (R) Relegated

=== Result table ===
Home \ Away	ASG	CA	CAB	COM	CSS	ESM	ESS	EST	ESZ	JSK	SG	ST	USBG	USM
Avenir de Gabès	—	1–0	2–1	2–0	1–2	5–1	0–2	1–1	0–0	2–0	1–0	2–2	0–3	0–2
Club Africain	2–1	—	0–2	1–1	2–1	5–1	1–0	2–1	4–0	3–0	1–0	1–2	2–1	4–1
Club Bizertin	3–2	3–1	—	2–1	2–1	1–2	1–2	2–3	1–2	1–0	2–1	3–1	3–0	1–0
Olympique Médenine	0–0	0–1	1–2	—	0–5	1–0	2–1	0–2	0–3	0–0	0–3	1–0	1–1	0–2
Club Sfaxien	1–1	1–0	3–1	1–0	—	1–0	0–1	0–2	1–0	4–0	0–0	4–1	3–0	0–0
Étoile de Métlaoui	1–0	1–1	2–0	4–0	0–0	—	1–1	0–3	2–2	0–0	1–1	2–0	1–0	2–1
Étoile du Sahel	3–0	0–1	3–2	4–0	1–2	3–0	—	0–0	3–1	4–0	2–0	1–0	2–0	0–0
Espérance de Tunis	1–0	1–0	1–0	3–1	1–1	1–0	3–2	—	2–0	2–2	3–0	3–0	2–0	2–1
Espérance de Zarzis	0–0	0–0	0–2 (Note: Match forfeited, The original score was 1–0 for Espérance de Zarzis.)	0–0	0–0	1–3	0–1	1–0	—	0–0	1–0	2–1	0–2	0–0
Jeunesse Kairouanaise	2–0	1–0	0–2	1–0	2–1	0–2	1–0	1–2	0–0	—	2–0	1–2	2–0	2–1
Stade Gabèsien	1–1	0–1	1–0	1–0	1–3	0–0	0–0	1–1	0–0	1–0	—	2–0	1–0	0–0
Stade Tunisien	1–1	1–2	1–2	1–0	1–1	4–2	0–0	2–2	1–0	3–0	0–0	—	1–0	2–2
Union de Ben Guerdane	2–0	1–1	1–0	2–3	0–1	2–1	2–1	2–2	0–0	0–3	1–0	1–2	—	0–1
Union Monastirienne	1–2	0–0	1–1	1–0	1–0	2–1	0–1	0–2 (Note: Match forfeited. The original score was 0–1 for Espérance de Tunis.)	3–0	2–0	1–1	1–0	1–1	—

Source: Ligue 1
Legend: Blue = home team win; Yellow = draw; Red = away team win.
For upcoming matches, an "a" indicates there is an article about the rivalry between the two participants.

== Top goalscorers ==
Rank	Player	Club	Goals
1	(Tunisia) Alaeddine Marzouki	Club Sfaxien	10
1	(Tunisia) Lassaad Jaziri	Union de Ben Guerdane	10
2	(Tunisia) Zied Ounelli	Club Bizertin	9
2	(Tunisia) Saber Khalifa	Club Africain	9
5	(Tunisia) Taha Yassine Khenissi	Espérance de Tunis	8
5	(Benin) Jacques Bessan	Stade Tunisien	8
7	(Tunisia) Firas Chaouat	Club Sfaxien	7
7	(Tunisia) Firas Ben Larbi	Club Bizertin	7
7	(Tunisia) Hamza Jelassi	Club Bizertin	7
7	(Tunisia) Slim Mezlini	Avenir de Gabès	7
7	(Tunisia) Imed Meniaoui	Étoile de Métlaoui	7

== See also ==
- 2017–18 Tunisian Ligue Professionnelle 2
- 2017–18 Tunisian Cup
- 2019 Tunisian Super Cup
