= Mohamed Jemâa =

Tunisian footballer

Personal information
- Full name: Mohamed Jemâa Khelif
- Date of birth: 9 May 1988 (age 38)
- Height: 1.72 m (5 ft 8 in)
- Position: Midfielder

Senior career*
Years	Team	Apps	(Gls)
2013–2018	ES Métlaoui		
2018–2020	AS Gabès		
2020–2021	ES Métlaoui		
- * Club domestic league appearances and goals

Mohamed Jemâa (born 9 May 1988) is a Tunisian football midfielder.
