= Ezzedine Khémila =

Tunisian football manager

Team information
- Current team: EGS Gafsa (manager)

Managerial career
- Years: Team
- 1995–1997: AS Djerba
- 1998–1999: EO Sidi Bouzid
- 2002–2004: ES Métlaoui
- 2004–2005: STIR Zarzouna
- 2005–2006: ES Métlaoui
- 2006–2007: EO Sidi Bouzid
- 2007: EGS Gafsa (assistant)
- 2007–2008: EGS Gafsa
- 2009–2010: ES Beni-Khalled
- 2010–2011: ES Métlaoui
- 2011: SC Moknine
- 2011–2012: CS Hilalien
- 2012: US Ben Guerdane
- 2012–2013: EGS Gafsa
- 2014–2015: Tunisia U18
- 2015–2016: EGS Gafsa (assistant)
- 2017: EGS Gafsa
- 2017: Olympique Béja
- 2018–2019: CO Medenine
- 2019: Sfax Railways
- 2019: ES Zarzis
- 2025–2026: EGS Gafsa

Ezzedine Khémila is a Tunisian football manager.
