= Aymen Zidane =

Tunisian footballer

Personal information
- Date of birth: 3 March 1983 (age 43)
- Place of birth: Tunis, Tunisia
- Height: 1.88 m (6 ft 2 in)
- Position: Goalkeeper

Senior career*
Years	Team	Apps	(Gls)
2007–2008	Stade Tunisien		
2009–2010	EGS Gafsa		
2010	AS Gabès		
2011–2012	Olympique Beja		
2012–2013	EGS Gafsa		
- * Club domestic league appearances and goals

Aymen Zidane (born 3 March 1983) is a Tunisian football goalkeeper.
