= Patrick Loa Loa =

Cameroonian footballer (born 1999)

Personal information
- Full name: Patrick Steve Loa Loa
- Date of birth: 3 June 1999 (age 27)
- Place of birth: Cameroon
- Height: 1.81 m (5 ft 11 in)
- Position: Forward

Senior career*
Years	Team	Apps	(Gls)
2017–2021	US Ben Guerdane	61	(5)
2021–2022	Ilves	38	(2)
2022	Ilves II	1	(1)

International career
- Cameroon U20
- Cameroon U23
- * Club domestic league appearances and goals as of 21 December 2024

Patrick Steve Loa Loa (born 3 June 1999) is a Cameroonian professional footballer who plays as a forward.

== Club career ==
After playing in Tunisia for US Ben Guerdane in top-tier Tunisian Ligue Professionnelle 1, Loa Loa moved to Finland and signed with Ilves in the country's premier league Veikkausliiga.

== Career statistics ==
As of 31 December 2022

Appearances and goals by club, season and competition
Club	Season	League			Cup (Note: Includes Tunisian Cup and Suomen Cup)		League cup (Note: Includes Finnish League Cup)		Continental		Total	
Club	Season	Division	Apps	Goals	Apps	Goals	Apps	Goals	Apps	Goals	Apps	Goals
US Ben Guerdane	2017–18	Tunisian Ligue 1	22	4	1	0	–		1 (Note: Appearance(s) in CAF Confederation Cup)	1	24	5
US Ben Guerdane	2018–19	Tunisian Ligue 1	13	1	1	0	–		–		14	1
US Ben Guerdane	2019–20	Tunisian Ligue 1	15	0	1	0	–		–		16	0
US Ben Guerdane	2020–21	Tunisian Ligue 1	11	0	0	0	–		–		11	0
US Ben Guerdane	Total		61	5	3	0	0	0	1	1	65	6
Ilves	2021	Veikkausliiga	24	2	0	0	–		–		24	2
Ilves	2022	Veikkausliiga	14	0	2	0	4	1	–		20	1
Ilves	Total		38	2	2	0	4	1	0	0	44	3
Ilves II	2022	Kakkonen	1	1	–		–		–		1	1
Career total			100	8	5	0	4	1	1	1	110	10
