= ES Radès =

ES Radès may refer to:

- ES Radès (basketball), basketball section of the multi-sports club
- ES Radès (football), football section of the multi-sports club
