= Khelifa Bannani =

Tunisian footballer

Personal information
- Date of birth: 9 June 1985 (age 41)
- Position: Defender

Senior career*
Years	Team	Apps	(Gls)
2005–2015	EGS Gafsa		
- * Club domestic league appearances and goals

Khelifa Bannani (born 9 June 1985) is a Tunisian football defender.
