= Hachem Abbès =

Tunisian footballer

Personal information
- Full name: Hachem Abbès
- Date of birth: 1 December 1986 (age 39)
- Place of birth: Sfax, Tunisia
- Height: 1.88 m (6 ft 2 in)
- Position: Defender

Team information
- Current team: EGS Gafsa
- Number: 33

Senior career*
Years	Team	Apps	(Gls)
2007–2008	Stade Gabèsien	13	(1)
2008–2011	CS Sfaxien	25	(2)
2009–2010	→ ES Zarzis (loan)	20	(0)
2011–2014	Widzew Łódź	44	(1)
2013	Widzew Łódź II	9	(0)
2014-2016	Stade Tunisien	65	(4)
2016–2018	Stade Gabèsien	52	(3)
2018–2019	ES Métlaoui	6	(0)
2019–2021	Al-Nahda		
2021–2023	ES Métlaoui	44	(3)
2023–	EGS Gafsa	16	(0)
- * Club domestic league appearances and goals as of 18 November 2024

Hachem Abbès (born 1 December 1986) is a Tunisian professional footballer who plays as a defender for EGS Gafsa.

== Career ==
In August 2011, he was loaned to Widzew Łódź on a half-year deal.

== Honours ==
CS Sfaxien

- Tunisian Cup: 2008–09
