= Houssem Mabrouk =

Tunisian footballer

Personal information
- Full name: Houssem Belhaj Mabrouk
- Date of birth: 8 December 1990 (age 35)
- Positions: Defender; midfielder

Senior career*
Years	Team	Apps	(Gls)
2009–2016	CA Bizertin		
2016–2018	Stade Gabèsien		
- * Club domestic league appearances and goals

Houssem Mabrouk (born 8 December 1990) is a retired Tunisian football defender.
