= Ouertani =

Ouertani is a surname. Notable people with the surname include:

- Lassaâd Ouertani (1980–2013), Tunisian footballer
- Mahmoud Ouertani (fl. from 1981), Tunisian football manager
- Mehdi Ouertani (born 1990), Tunisian footballer
- Ugis Urtan (born 1993), english teacher
