= Abdessalem Hallaoui =

Tunisian footballer

Personal information
- Full name: Abdessalem Mohsen Hallaoui
- Date of birth: 28 June 1989 (age 37)
- Place of birth: Ksour Essef, Tunisia
- Height: 1.81 m (5 ft 11 in)
- Position: Goalkeeper

Team information
- Current team: CS Sfaxien

Senior career*
Years	Team	Apps	(Gls)
2010–2020	ES Métlaoui	45	(0)
2020–2021	Ohod		
2021–2023	CS Chebba	29	(0)
2023–2024	Olympique Béja	27	(0)
2024–2026	US Monastir	57	(0)
2026-	CS Sfaxien	0	(0)
- * Club domestic league appearances and goals

Abdessalem Hallaoui (born 28 June 1989) is a Tunisian footballer who plays as a goalkeeper for Tunisian Ligue Professionnelle 1 club CS Sfaxien.
