= Izaka Aboudou =

Ghanaian footballer

Personal information
- Full name: Izaka Aboudou Diarra
- Date of birth: 14 March 1994 (age 32)
- Place of birth: Ghana
- Height: 1.83 m (6 ft 0 in)
- Position: Forward

Team information
- Current team: Al-Jahra

Senior career*
| Years | Team | Apps | (Gls) |
| 2014–2015 | RC Kadiogo | | |
| 2015–2017 | Hammam-Lif | 50 | (9) |
| 2017–2019 | Stade Gabèsien | 48 | (9) |
| 2019 | Al-Fahaheel | | |
| 2019–2020 | Al-Nejmah | | |
| 2020 | ES Métlaoui | 12 | (4) |
| 2020–2021 | Al-Kawkab | 11 | (5) |
| 2021–2022 | Najran | 33 | (9) |
| 2022– | Al-Jahra | | |
- * Club domestic league appearances and goals

Izaka Aboudou (born 14 March 1994) is a Ghanaian footballer who plays for Kuwaiti club Al-Jahra as a forward.

== Career ==
On 12 July 2022, Aboudou joined Kuwaiti club Al-Jahra.
