= Ali Frioui =

Tunisian footballer

Personal information
- Full name: Ali Frioui
- Date of birth: 22 April 1993 (age 33)
- Place of birth: Tunisia
- Height: 1.86 m (6 ft 1 in)
- Position: Goalkeeper

Team information
- Current team: EGS Gafsa

Senior career*
Years	Team	Apps	(Gls)
2015–2020	JS Kairouan	43	(0)
2020–2021	CA Bizertin	0	(0)
2022	Olympique Béja	1	(0)
2022–2023	JS Kairouan	0	(0)
2023–2024	US Tataouine	11	(0)
2024	Al-Shoulla		
2024–	EGS Gafsa	4	(0)
- * Club domestic league appearances and goals

Ali Frioui (born 22 April 1993) is a Tunisian football goalkeeper who currently plays for EGS Gafsa as a goalkeeper.

He joined Saudi Second Division side Al-Shoulla on 29 January 2024.
