= Mahmoud Ouertani =

Tunisian football manager

Managerial career
- Years: Team
- 1981–1982: ES Hammam-Sousse
- 1991–1992: ES Métlaoui
- 1997: CA Bizertin
- 2009: Stade Tunisien
- 2010–2011: Tunisia (technical director)
- 2013: Stade Tunisien
- 2013–2014: JS Kairouan
- 2014: CA Bizertin (director of sports)
- 2015: CA Bizertin

Mahmoud Ouertani is a Tunisian football manager.
