= Udoh Etop =

Nigerian footballer

Personal information
- Full name: Udoh Etop David
- Date of birth: 11 November 1999 (age 26)
- Place of birth: Nigeria
- Height: 1.86 m (6 ft 1 in)
- Position: Midfielder

Senior career*
Years	Team	Apps	(Gls)
2018–2019	Lori	15	(1)
2019–2020	Kairouan	7	(0)
2020–2021	Arar	13	(0)
- * Club domestic league appearances and goals

Udoh Etop David (born 11 November 1999) is a Nigerian footballer.
