= Mabrouk Jendli =

Tunisian footballer

Personal information
- Full name: Mabrouk Jendli
- Date of birth: 6 March 1992 (age 34)
- Place of birth: Tunisia
- Position: Defender

Senior career*
Years	Team	Apps	(Gls)
2013–2018	US Tataouine		
2018	CA Bizertin		
2018–2020	US Ben Guerdane		
2020–2021	Ohod		
- * Club domestic league appearances and goals

Mabrouk Jendli (born 6 March 1992) is a Tunisian footballer who plays as a defender.
