= ES Radès (football) =

Tunisian football club

- Full name: Étoile Sportive de Radès
- Founded: 1948
- Ground: Hédi Ben Romdhane Stadium
- Capacity: 1500
- Chairman: Adel Ben Romdhane
- League: Ligue 2
- 2023–24: Ligue 2, Group A, 10th of 14
Home colours	Away colours

Étoile Sportive de Radès (Arabic: النجم الرياضي الرادسي), known as ES Radès or simply ESR for short, is a Tunisian football club based in Radès. The club was founded in 1948, and its colours are blue and white. Their home stadium, Hédi Ben Romdhane Stadium, has a capacity of 1,500 spectators. The club is currently playing in the Tunisian Ligue Professionnelle 2. The team used to be called Union Sportive Radèsienne before 1965.

== History ==
=== Football in Radès ===
The city's first football club was founded in 1924. It was La Radésienne, but this club only lived for three years. In 1931, a second club was born in the city: Aquila de Radès, which distinguished itself by winning the third division championship in Tunis and the suburbs in 1934, the year in which another club was created, the Radésienne Sports Union (USR), which in turn won the same title in 1935.

The two clubs found themselves in the second division and the city was entitled to its little derby. Training-oriented USR advance to the semi-finals of the 1936–37 Tunisian Cup. It gained great popularity at the expense of its rival L'Aquila, which was disbanded in 1938. But its momentum was halted by World War II. A new club, the Française de Radès, replaced her in 1942, before adopting a new name, the Sports Association of Radès. This club was open to different communities, but the nationalists created their own club in May 1948, the Etoile Sportive Radésienne, which became the first club in the city despite the short-lived rebirth of La Radésienne in 1954.

=== Club history ===
Led by a first committee chaired by Hédi Dherif, the club rose through the ranks by successively winning the division 6, 5 and 4 championships. He reached the quarter-finals of the Tunisian Cup 1953–54.

After independence, the club fluctuated between the second and fifth divisions, finding themselves relegated to second place behind the more successful basketball team. However, his two performances in the Tunisian Cup where he reached the quarter-finals twice: in 1957, where he was eliminated by Stade Tunisien 0–1, and in 1974, where he played two matches against ES Métlaoui 4–2. That year, the team was coached by a young yet unknown coach, Mrad Mahjoub.

The club changes its name three times. It became the Union sportive radésienne, following the merger with La Radésienne in 1964, then the Radès Transport Club following sponsorship by transport companies in 1968, before becoming the Etoile sportive de Radès again in 1976.

== Personalities ==
=== Presidents ===
- (Tunisia) Hédi Dhraief (1948–1956)
- (Tunisia) Taoufik Haouet (1957–1958)
- (Tunisia) Baccar Jellouli (1958–1964)
- (Tunisia) Abdallah Farhat (1964–1968)
- (Tunisia) Mohamed Zaouali (1968–1969)
- (Tunisia) Hédi Annabi (1969–1970)
- (Tunisia) Raouf Menjour (1970–1972)
- (Tunisia) Cherif Nabli
- (Tunisia) Morched Ben Ali
- (Tunisia) Raouf Menjour (1975–1981)
- (Tunisia) Hédi Ben Romdhan (1982–1984)
- (Tunisia) Azedine Beschaouch (1990–1993)
- (Tunisia) Tahar Ben Zid (2006–2007)
- (Tunisia) Hamadi Abdeljaoued (2007–2009)
- (Tunisia) Ridha Ben Amor (2009–2011)
- (Tunisia) Haykel Ben Amor (2011–2014)
- (Tunisia) Mounir Laâdhari (2014–2015)
- (Tunisia) Adel Ben Romdhane (since 2016)

=== Managers ===
- 1955–1957: (France) Noël Gallo
- 1958–1959: (Tunisia) Salah Béji
- 1959–1960: (Tunisia) Hédi Afchar
- 1960–1961: (Tunisia) Ahmed Benelfoul & (Tunisia) Khemais Lakhal
- 1965–1966: (Tunisia) Hmida Hajri & (Tunisia) Salah Béji
- 1966–1971: (Tunisia) Salah Béji
- 1971–1972: (Tunisia) Hédi Ben Romdhan
- 1972–1976: (Tunisia) Mrad Mahjoub
- 1976–1978: (Tunisia) Mohamed Salah Jedidi
- 1978–1979: (Tunisia) Rafik Ammar
- 1979–1980: (Tunisia) Zouhair Karoui
- 1980–1981: (Tunisia) Slim Zlitni & (Tunisia) Youssef Amraoui
- 1981–1982: (Tunisia) Abdelwahab Lahmar
- 1982–1983: (Tunisia) Mohamed Salah Jedidi
- 1983–1984: (Tunisia) Jilani Aouali & (Tunisia) Rejeb Sayeh
- 1984–1985: (Tunisia) Tahar Bellamine & (Tunisia) Youssef Amraoui
- 1985–1987: (Tunisia) Abid Mchala
- 1987–1988: (Tunisia) Abdelaziz Seddik
- 1988–1991: (Tunisia) Larbi Bezdah
- 1991–1992: (Tunisia) Abdelaziz Seddik
- 1992–1993: (Tunisia) Taoufik Skhiri & (Tunisia) Slim Ben Zid
- 1993–1994: (Tunisia) Larbi Bezdah
- 1994–1995: (Tunisia) Mahmoud Saâdi & (Tunisia) Tahar Ayari
- 1995–1996: (Tunisia) Larbi Bezdah
- 1996–1997: (Tunisia) Slim Ben Zid
- 1997–1998: (Tunisia) Slim Ben Zid & (Tunisia) Salem Kraïem
- 1998–1999: (Tunisia) Jamel Mouelhi
- 2000–2002: (Tunisia) Larbi Bezdah & (Tunisia) Mohieddine Habita
- 2002–2003: (Tunisia) Youssef Amraoui & (Tunisia) Abdelmajid Gobantini
- 2003–2004: (Tunisia) Larbi Bezdah
- 2004–2005: (Tunisia) Jamel Mouelhi & (Tunisia) Nabil Kouki
- 2005–2007: (Tunisia) Larbi Bezdah
- 2007–2008: (Tunisia) Larbi Bezdah & (Tunisia) Houcine Ayari
- 2008–2011: (Tunisia) Allala Ben Younes
- 2011–2012: (Tunisia) Nabil Gharsallah & (Tunisia) Tahar Bellamine
- 2012–2013: (Tunisia) Hatem Chaffaï & (Tunisia) Slim Ben Zid
- 2013–2015: (Tunisia) Allala Ben Younes
- 2015–2016: (Tunisia) Mehrez Miladi
- 2016–2017: (Tunisia) Allala Ben Younes
- 2017: (Tunisia) Tarek Messaoudi & (Tunisia) Larbi Bezdah
- 2017–: (Tunisia) Sassi Ouerfelli

== See also ==
- Étoile Sportive de Radès (basketball)
