= Gabès Municipal Stadium =

Sports venue in Gabès, Tunisia

Coordinates: 33.8477°N 10.0994°E

- Stade Zrig
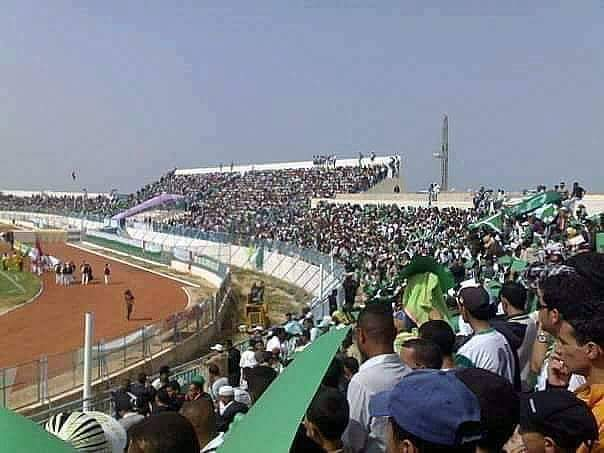
- Interactive map of Gabès Municipal Stadium
- Full name: Gabès Municipal Stadium
- Location: Gabès, Tunisia
- Capacity: 15,000
- Field size: 105 × 65 m

Tenants
- Stade Gabèsien; AS Gabès

The Gabès Municipal Stadium (Arabic: الملعب البلدي بقابس) is a multi-use stadium in Gabès, Tunisia. It is currently used mostly for football matches and is the home ground of Stade Gabèsien and AS Gabès of the Tunisian Ligue Professionnelle 1. The stadium has a capacity of 15,000 spectators.
