= Olympique Sidi Bouzid =

Tunisian football club

- Full name: Olympique Sidi Bouzid
- Nickname: OSB
- Founded: 1959
- Chairman: Riadh Yousfi
- Manager: Jamel Belhedi
- League: Professional League 2
- 2024-2025: 8th, Group B
- Website: eo-sidi-bouzid.com
Home colours

Olympique Sidi Bouzid Arabic: أولمبيك سيدي بوزيد) is a Tunisian football club founded in 1959 in the city of Sidi Bouzid. The club is currently evolving in the Ligue 1. The name of the club comes from the names of Club Olympique de Sidi Bouzid and l'Étoile Sportive de Gammouda, two clubs that merged in 2003 to create the current EOSB.
