= EGS Gafsa =

Tunisian association football club

El Gawafel de Gafsa
- Full name: El Gawafel Sportives de Gafsa
- Nickname: El Falluja
- Founded: 1967
- Ground: Mohamed Rouached Stadium
- Capacity: 7,000
- Chairman: Khaled Bennour
- Manager: Aymen Makhlouf
- League: Ligue 2
- 2025-26: Group B 7th of 14
- Website: http://egsgafsa.com
Home colours	Away colours

El Gawafel Sportives de Gafsa (Arabic: القوافل الرياضية بقفصة), known as EGS Gafsa or simply EGSG for short, is a Tunisian football club based in Gafsa. The club was founded in 1967 and its colours are green and yellow. Their home stadium, Mohamed Rouached Stadium, has a capacity of 7,000 spectators. The club is currently playing in the Ligue 2.

== Current squad ==
As of 9 February 2025

Note: Flags indicate national team as defined under FIFA eligibility rules; some limited exceptions apply. Players may hold more than one non-FIFA nationality.

No.	Pos.	Nation	Player
1	GK	TUN	Rami Jeridi
4	DF	TUN	Adem Chabbi
5	DF	TUN	Azer Chokri
6	FW	TUN	Mohamed Aziz Yaakoubi
7	MF	TUN	Anouar Jouini
9	FW	TUN	Hazem Mbarek
10	FW	TUN	Haythem Mbarek
11	FW	TUN	Fayed Ben Hassine
12	FW	TUN	Ali Ajmani
14	MF	TUN	Mahmoud Messai
15	DF	TUN	Seddik Mejri
16	GK	TUN	Ali Frioui
17	FW	TUN	Amir Al Omrani
18	DF	TUN	Oussama Jebali

No.	Pos.	Nation	Player
19	DF	TUN	Ahmed Horchani
20	MF	TUN	Heythem Mhamedi
21	MF	TUN	Anas Barbati
23	DF	CIV	Noel Agbre
24	MF	TUN	Mohamed Bennour
25	MF	GUI	Alkhaly Traore
26	DF	BRA	Jonatas
27	DF	TUN	Baraket Chaabani
28	DF	TUN	Hassine Ben Chaieb
29	FW	GUI	Alkhaly Bangoura
30	DF	TUN	Nassim Khedher
33	DF	TUN	Hachem Abbes
—	GK	TUN	Raed Ben Rebha

== Official honours ==
Type	Competition	Titles	Winning Seasons
Domestic	Tunisian Ligue Professionnelle 2	1	2022-23

== Performance in CAF competitions ==
- CAF Confederation Cup: 1 appearance

2007 – Intermediate Round

== Evolution ==
- 1968–69 : Division III (South-West)
- 1969–70 : Division II
- 1970–72 : Division III (South-West)
- 1972–76 : Division II (Centre-South)
- 1976–78 : Division III (South-West)
- 1978–80 : Division II (Centre-South)
- 1980–83 : Division III (South-West)
- 1983–88 : Division II (South)
- 1988–90 : Division I (Centre-South)
- 1990–91 : Honor Division
- 1991–93 : Division I (Centre-South)
- 1993–96 : Honor Division
- 1996–00 : Honor Division (South)
- 2000–05 : League II
- 2005–2016 : League I
- 2016-23 : League II
- 2023–?? : League I

== Former coaches ==
- Noureddine Ben Ammar (1968–1969)
- Omrane Fitouri (1969–1971)
- Abdelwahab Lahmar (1971–1972)
- Abdelhafidh Arfa (1972–1974)
- Omrane Fitouri (1974)
- Abdelhafidh Arfa (1974–1977)
- Abdelwahab Lahmar (1977–1978)
- Amor Bellil (1978–1979)
- Mustapha Jouili (1979–1980)
- Sassi Belhoula (1980–1981)
- Abdelhafidh Arfa (1981–1982)
- Abid Mchala (1982–1983)
- Abdelwahab Lahmar (1983–1984)
- Mohamed El Abed (1984–1985)
- Abdelhafidh Arfa (1985–1986)
- Noureddine Ben Ammar (1986)
- Mohamed El Abed (1986–1987)
- Sassi Belhoula (1987)
- Laaribi (1987–1988)
- Abdeljelil Ben Miled (1988)
- Ezzedine Khémila (1988)
- Mohamed Salah Jedidi (1988–1989)
- Mohamed El Abed (1989–1990)
- Rojkov (1990–1991)
- Fakher Trigui (1991)
- Hassen Feddou (1991–1992)
- Ezzedine Khémila (1992–1993)
- Abderrahmane Rahmouni (1993)
- Abdelhafidh Arfa (1993–1994)
- Ezzedine Khémila (1994–1995)
- Wahid Hidoussi (1995–1996)
- Belhassen Meriah (1996)
- Abdelaziz Seddik (1996–1997)
- Georgi Gyurov (1997–1998)
- Hédi Kouni (1998)
- Ammar Souayah (1998–1999)
- Ezzedine Khémila (1999)
- Youssef Seriati (1999)
- Moncef Arfaoui (1999)
- Abdelhafidh Arfa (1999)
- Mohamed El Abed (1999–2000)
- Georgi Gyurov (2000)
- Abderrahmane Rahmouni (2000)
- Ezzedine Khémila (2000–2001)
- Farhat Zarrouk (2001)
- Momarton (2001–2002)
- Moncef Arfaoui (2002)
- Mahmoud Ouertani (2002–2003)
- Sassi Belhoula (2003)
- Mohamed Henkouche (2003)
- Ezzedine Khémila (2003)
- Abdelwahab Lahmar (2003–2004)
- Jalel Kadri (2004–2005)
- Amor Meziane (2005)
- Ferid Ben Belgacem (2005–2007)
- Khaled Ben Yahia (2007)
- Ezzedine Khémila (2007–2008)
- Samir Jouili (2008)
- Abdelaziz Khrouf (2008)
- Moncef Arfaoui (2008)
- Ghazi Ghrairi (2009)
- Mohamed Kouki (2009)
- Abdelmadjid Khrouf (2008)
- Sami Radhouani (2009–2010)
- Jalel Kadri (2010)
- Ferid Ben Belgacem (2010–2011)
- Khaled Ben Sassi (2011)
- Kamel Zouaghi (2011)
- Khaled Ben Yahia (2011–2012)
- Patrick Liewig (2012)
- Farhat Zarrouk (2012)
- Ezzedine Khémila (2012–2013)
- Habib Mejri (2013)
- Khaled Ben Yahia (2013–2014)
- Lotfi Kadri (2014)
- Habib Mejri (2014)
- Khaled Ben Yahia (2014)
- Nabil Kouki (2014–2015)
- Khaled Ben Yahia (2015)
- Hamadi Dhaou (2015)
- Khaled Ben Yahia (2015)
- Kais Yaâkoubi (2015–2016)
- Hassen Gabsi (2016)
- Lotfi Sebti (2016–2017)
- Ezzedine Khémila (2017)
- Hedi Mokrani (2017–2018)
- Karim Dalhoum (2018)
- Lotfi Jebali (2018–2019)
- Chokri Bejaoui (2019–2020)
- Kaïs Karoui (2020)
- Nabil Ferchichi (2021)
- Nidhal Khiari (2021–2022)
- Lotfi Jebali (2022–2023)
- Chaker Meftah (2023–2024)
- Skander Kasri (2024)
- Sofiene Hidoussi (2024)
- Samir Jouili (2024)
- Jamel Khcharem (2024)
- Skander Kasri (2024–2025)
- Farhat Zarrouk (2025)
- Ezzedine Khémila (2025–2026)
- Farhat Zarrouk (2026)
- Aymen Makhlouf(2026-)
