= AS Gabès =

Association football club in Tunisia

- Full name: Avenir Sportif de Gabès
- Nicknames: Zliza, Kawasser
- Founded: 1978; 48 years ago
- Ground: Gabès Municipal Stadium
- Capacity: 15,000
- Chairman: Mongi Hsine
- Coach: Mohamed Tlemcani
- League: Tunisian Ligue Professionnelle 2
- 2025–26: Ligue 1, 16th of 16 (relegated)
Home colours	Away colours

Avenir Sportif de Gabès, (Arabic: المستقبل الرياضي بڨابس), known as AS Gabès or simply ASG for short, is a Tunisian football club based in Gabès. The club was founded in 1978 and its colours are red and black. Their home stadium, Gabès Municipal Stadium, has a capacity of 15,000 spectators. The club is currently playing in the Tunisian Ligue Professionnelle 1.

== Current squad ==
As of 8 November 2025

Note: Flags indicate national team as defined under FIFA eligibility rules; some limited exceptions apply. Players may hold more than one non-FIFA nationality.

No.	Pos.	Nation	Player
1	GK	TUN	Jasser Taieb
3	DF	TUN	Najed Helali
5	MF	TUN	Mohamed Ameur Ben Ghith
6	MF	TUN	Iheb Ben Amor
7	MF	TUN	Hakim Tka
8	FW	TUN	Mohamed Nasr Hamed
9	FW	TUN	Mouhib Selmi
10	MF	TUN	Aziz Sekrafi (On loan from CS Sfaxien until 30 June 2026)
11	DF	TUN	Nour El Beji
12	DF	TUN	Firas Ben Ammar
13	MF	TUN	Hsan Jmal
15	DF	TUN	Mohammed Amine Naoui
16	GK	TUN	Ahmed Yassine Mechri
17	DF	NIG	Mohamed Abdourahmane
18	MF	BEN	Gislain Ahoudo
20	MF	TUN	Mohammed Amine Khadhraoui (On loan from Club Africain until 30 June 2026)

No.	Pos.	Nation	Player
21	FW	CGO	Diolvy Agdvain Moukouba
22	GK	TUN	Abdelkader Chouaya
23	MF	TUN	Adem Boulila
24	FW	MTN	Moulaye Idriss
25	MF	NIG	Ridouane Assane
26	MF	TUN	Hassan Touati
27	FW	TUN	Ayoub Znati
28	DF	TUN	Hedi Trabelsi
29	FW	MTN	Fody Traoré
30	DF	TUN	Nassim Khedher
31	DF	TUN	Yassine Mizouni
32	GK	TUN	Hamza Ben Attig
33	FW	TUN	Hosni Guezmir
38	DF	TUN	Rayane Yaakoubi

No.	Pos.	Nation	Player
—	DF	TUN	Moomen Agrebi
—	DF	TUN	Moataz Bidani
—	DF	TUN	Oussama Ltifi
—	MF	BFA	Daouda Diallo
—	MF	TUN	Khalil Guesmi
—	FW	TUN	Abdelkader Mechri
—	FW	TUN	Mahdi Fessi
—	FW	TUN	Hamza Abdelkarim
—	FW	TUN	Oussema Naffati
