= Stade Gabèsien =

Tunisian association football club

- Full name: Stade Gabèsien
- Nickname: Stayda
- Founded: 1957
- Ground: Stade du Zrig; Gabès, Tunisia
- Capacity: 11,160
- Chairman: Mohamed Ayachi Ajroudi
- Manager: Chaker Meftah
- League: CLP-2
- 2024–25: 12th, Group B

Stade Gabèsien (Arabic: الملعب القابسي) or Stayda is a Tunisian football and basketball club from Gabès, founded since 1957. The club is playing in the Tunisian Professional League 1.
