= ES Métlaoui =

Tunisian football club

- Full name: Étoile Sportive de Métlaoui
- Nickname: Lions of mines
- Founded: 1950
- Ground: Métlaoui Municipal Stadium
- Capacity: 6,000
- Chairman: Rabah Dinari
- Manager: Amine Gara
- League: Tunisian Ligue Professionnelle 1
- 2025–26: Ligue 1, 8th of 16
Home colours	Away colours

Étoile Sportive de Métlaoui (Arabic: النجم الرياضي بالمتلوي), known as ES Métlaoui or simply ESM for short, is a Tunisian football club based in Métlaoui. The club was founded in 1950 and its colours are red and yellow. Their home stadium, Métlaoui Municipal stadium, has a capacity of 6,000 spectators. The club is currently playing in the Tunisian Ligue Professionnelle 1.

== Current squad ==
As of 2 October 2026

Note: Flags indicate national team as defined under FIFA eligibility rules; some limited exceptions apply. Players may hold more than one non-FIFA nationality.

No.	Pos.	Nation	Player
1	GK	TUN	Sadok Yeddes
4	DF	TUN	Mohamed Bouzaabia (on loan from Étoile Sahel)
5	MF	TUN	Mohamed Belghith
7	MF	TUN	Bacem Hajji
8	MF	CIV	Eric Kouassi
9	FW	TUN	Oussama Naffati
10	MF	TUN	Ismail Hermes
11	FW	TUN	Ameur Jouini (on loan from Sfaxien)
12	DF	BEN	Irenée Glele
13	MF	GUI	Abdoulaye Bangoura
14	FW	CMR	Brandon Nana
15	DF	TUN	Yassine Soltani
16	GK	TUN	Ahmed Yassine Mechri

No.	Pos.	Nation	Player
17	MF	TUN	Obaid Chabbi (on loan from Stade Tunisien)
18	DF	TUN	Oussama Hichri
20	DF	TUN	Mohamed Aziz Ghrissi (on loan from Club Africain)
23	MF	TUN	Youssef Mrad (on loan from Club Africain)
24	MF	CMR	Jeffrey André Nyobe
25	DF	TUN	Ited Fajraoui
26	DF	TUN	Ayoub Tlili
27	GK	TUN	Mohamed Aziz Bejaoui
28	FW	TUN	Mohamed Ali Ourimi
29	FW	NGR	Ifeanyi Ogba
30	GK	TUN	Yasser Dinari
34	DF	TUN	Montasser Toumi

== Honours ==
- Tunisian Ligue Professionnelle 2:
  - Winners (1): 2013

== Managers ==
- 1960–61 : Ali Soudani
- 1961–63 : Habib Mestiri
- 1963–65 : Ali Soudani
- 1965 : Octave Matteo
- 1965–67 : Noureddine Ben Mahmoud
- 1967–71 : Lenko "Gaga" Grčić
- 1971–73 : Mustapha Jouili
- 1973–75 : Ali Rached
- 1975–76 : Ivan Ridanović
- 1976–78 : Amor Dhib
- 1978–80 : Tahar Bellamine
- 1980–81 : Simon Effrimov
- 1979–82 : Mustapha Jouili
- 1982–83 : Mohamed Abed
- 1983–84 : Sava Stefanović
- 1984–86 : Mahmoud Ouertani
- 1986–88 : Abdelmajid Boujelal
- 1988–89 : Tahar Bellamine
- 1989–90 : Mohamed Fetis
- 1990–91 : Mounir Senoussi
- 1991–92 : Mahmoud Ouertani
- 1992–93 : Abdelmajid Boujelal
- 1993–94 : Boubaker Lanouar
- 1994–95 : Mohamed Tombari then Abdelmajid Boujelal
- 1995–96 : Mohamed Abed
  then Abdelhafidh Arfa
- 1996–97 : Abdelhafidh Arfa then Abdelmajid Boujelal
  then Ahmed Alaya
- 1997–98 : Ahmed Alaya
  then Noureddine Gharsalli
- 1998–99 : Salah Harrathi
- 1999–02 : Boubaker Lanouar
- 2002–03 : Ezzedine Khemila
  then Ali Khamlia
- 2003–04 : Ezzedine Khemila
  then Mohamed Abed
- 2004–05 : Mohamed Abed then Kacem Jabbes
- 2005–06 : Kacem Jabbes
  then Ezzedine Khemila
- 2006–07 : Hassen Oueslati
- 2007–08 : Moncef Belhassen then Riadh Hadhri
  then Mohamed Fetis
- 2008–09 : Abdelkader Belhassen
- 2009–10 : Abderraouf Marzouki
- 2010–11 : Ezzedine Khemila
  then Riadh Hadhri and Sami Alimi
- 2011–12 : Abdelkrim Gabsi
- July 1, 2012–1.. : Chokri Khatoui
