= 2015–16 Espérance Sportive de Tunis season =

Espérance Sportive de Tunis
2015–16 season
- President: Hamdi Meddeb
- Head coach: José Anigo (until 18 August 2015); Ammar Souayah (from 26 August 2015)
- Stadium: Stade de Radès
- Ligue 1: Runners–up
- Tunisian Cup: 2015: Quarter-finals; 2016: Round of 16
- Confederation Cup: 2015: Group stage 2016: Play-off round
- Top goalscorer: League: Khenissi & Bguir (12 goals); All: Khenissi (15 goals)

In the 2015–16 season, Espérance Sportive de Tunis competed in the Ligue 1 for the 61st season, as well as the Tunisian Cup. It was their 61st consecutive season in the top flight of Tunisian football. They competed in Ligue 1, the Confederation Cup and the Tunisian Cup.

== Squad list ==
Players and squad numbers last updated on 16 September 2015.
Note: Flags indicate national team as has been defined under FIFA eligibility rules. Players may hold more than one non-FIFA nationality.

| No. | Nat. | Position | Name | Date of birth (age) | Signed from |
Goalkeepers
| | (Tunisia) | GK | Moez Ben Cherifia | 24 June 1991 (aged 24) | (Tunisia) Youth system |
| | (Tunisia) | GK | Ali Jemal | 9 June 1990 (aged 25) | (Tunisia) US Ben Guerdane |
Defenders
| | (Tunisia) | CB | Ali Machani | 12 July 1993 (aged 22) | (Tunisia) CA Bizerte |
| | (Tunisia) | CB | Chamseddine Dhaouadi | 15 January 1987 (aged 28) | (Tunisia) Étoile Sportive du Sahel |
| | (Tunisia) | CB | Khalil Chemmam | 24 July 1987 (aged 28) | (Portugal) Vitória de Guimarães |
| | (Tunisia) | RB | Iheb Mbarki | 14 February 1992 (aged 23) | (France) Thonon Évian |
| | (Tunisia) | LB | Houcine Rabii | 8 November 1991 (aged 23) | (Tunisia) ES Zarzis |
Midfielders
| | (Ivory Coast) | | Fousseny Coulibaly | 10 August 1989 (aged 26) | (Tunisia) Stade Tunisien |
| | (Tunisia) | | Saad Bguir | 22 March 1994 (aged 21) | (Tunisia) Stade Gabèsien |
| | (Tunisia) | | Ghailene Chaalali | 28 February 1994 (aged 21) | (Tunisia) Youth system |
Forwards
| | (Tunisia) | | Taha Yassine Khenissi | 6 January 1992 (aged 23) | (Tunisia) CS Sfaxien |
| | (Tunisia) | | Fakhreddine Ben Youssef | 23 June 1991 (aged 24) | (Tunisia) CS Sfaxien |

== Competitions ==
=== Overview ===
| Competition | Record | | | | | | | | Started round | Final position / round | First match | Last match |
| Competition | G | W | D | L | GF | GA | GD | Win % | Started round | Final position / round | First match | Last match |
|---|---|---|---|---|---|---|---|---|---|---|---|---|
| Ligue 1 | 30 | 23 | 3 | 4 | 60 | 21 | +39 | 76.67 | —N/a | Runners–up | 16 September 2015 | 12 June 2016 |
| 2015 Tunisian Cup | 2 | 1 | 0 | 1 | 2 | 2 | +0 | 50.00 | Round of 16 | Quarter-finals | 5 August 2015 | 16 August 2015 |
| 2016 Tunisian Cup | 2 | 2 | 0 | 0 | 9 | 0 | +9 | 100.00 | Round of 32 | Round of 16 | 30 January 2016 | 7 February 2016 |
| 2015 Confederation Cup | 6 | 1 | 0 | 5 | 3 | 9 | −6 | 16.67 | Group stage | | 28 June 2015 | 12 September 2015 |
| 2016 Confederation Cup | 6 | 3 | 2 | 1 | 12 | 3 | +9 | 50.00 | First round | Play-off round | 12 March 2016 | 17 May 2016 |
| Total | 46 | 30 | 5 | 11 | 86 | 35 | +51 | 65.22 | | | | |

Updated to match played 3 June 2019
Source: Competitions

== League table ==
| Pos | Team | Pld | W | D | L | GF | GA | GD | Pts | Qualification or relegation |
|---|---|---|---|---|---|---|---|---|---|---|
| 1 | Étoile du Sahel (C) | 30 | 24 | 5 | 1 | 57 | 17 | +40 | 77 | 2017 CAF Champions League |
| 2 | Espérance de Tunis | 30 | 23 | 3 | 4 | 60 | 21 | +39 | 72 | 2017 CAF Champions League and 2017 Arab Club Championship |
| 3 | Club Sfaxien | 30 | 23 | 3 | 4 | 57 | 21 | +36 | 72 | 2017 CAF Confederation Cup |
| 4 | Étoile de Métlaoui | 30 | 15 | 4 | 11 | 36 | 26 | +10 | 49 | |
| 5 | Club Bizertin | 30 | 11 | 8 | 11 | 21 | 21 | 0 | 41 | |

Source: Ligue 1
Rules for classification: 1) points; 2) goal difference; 3) number of goals scored.
(C) Champions

=== Results summary ===
| Overall | | | | | | | | Home | | | | | | Away | | | | | |
| Pld | W | D | L | GF | GA | GD | Pts | W | D | L | GF | GA | GD | W | D | L | GF | GA | GD |
|---|---|---|---|---|---|---|---|---|---|---|---|---|---|---|---|---|---|---|---|
| 30 | 23 | 3 | 4 | 60 | 21 | +39 | 72 | 13 | 1 | 1 | 36 | 11 | +25 | 10 | 2 | 3 | 24 | 10 | +14 |

Last updated: 22 April 2018.
Source: Competitive matches

=== Results by round ===
| Round | 1 | 2 | 3 | 4 | 5 | 6 | 7 | 8 | 9 | 10 | 11 | 12 | 13 | 14 | 15 | 16 | 17 | 18 | 19 | 20 | 21 | 22 | 23 | 24 | 25 | 26 | 27 | 28 | 29 | 30 |
|---|---|---|---|---|---|---|---|---|---|---|---|---|---|---|---|---|---|---|---|---|---|---|---|---|---|---|---|---|---|---|
| Ground | A | H | A | H | A | H | A | H | A | H | A | H | H | A | H | H | A | H | A | H | A | H | A | H | A | H | A | A | H | A |
| Result | L | W | W | W | W | W | W | W | W | W | L | W | L | W | W | W | W | W | W | W | W | D | W | W | W | L | D | W | W | D |
| Position | 12 | 11 | 8 | 4 | 4 | 2 | 2 | 2 | 2 | 1 | 3 | 2 | 3 | 3 | 3 | 3 | 3 | 3 | 3 | 3 | 3 | 3 | 3 | 3 | 2 | 2 | 3 | 3 | 2 | 2 |

Source: Competitive matches
A = Away; H = Home; W = Win; D = Draw; L = Loss

=== Matches ===
Win Draw Loss

| 16 September 2015 Round 1 | AS Marsa | 3–1 | Espérance de Tunis | Tunis |
| 15:30 | Yahia 24'; Jaziri 60'; Dramé 80' | Soccerway report | Khenissi 86' | Stadium: Stade Abdelaziz Chtioui; Referee: Walid Jeridi |

| 20 September 2015 Round 2 | Espérance de Tunis | 1–0 | ES Métlaoui | Tunis |
| 15:30 | Bguir 26' | Soccerway report | | Stadium: Stade Olympique de Radès; Referee: Hichem Barkallah |

| 26 September 2015 Round 3 | US Ben Guerdane | 0–2 | Espérance de Tunis | Ben Guerdane |
| 15:30 | | Soccerway report | Khenissi 59' (pen.); Mhirsi 84' | Stadium: Stade du 7 Mars; Referee: Nasrallah Jaouadi |

| 2 October 2015 Round 4 | Espérance de Tunis | 2–1 | CS Hammam-Lif | Tunis |
| 15:00 | Ragued 3'; Khenissi 59' | Soccerway report | Issaka 89' | Stadium: Stade Olympique de Radès; Referee: Ameur Chouchen |

| 14 October 2015 Round 5 | Club Africain | 0–2 | Espérance de Tunis | Tunis |
| 17:00 | | Soccerway report | Ben Youssef 78'; Mhirsi 89' | Stadium: Stade Olympique de Radès; Referee: Mohamed Saïd Kordi |

| 1 November 2015 Round 6 | Espérance de Tunis | 5–0 | AS Kasserine | Tunis |
| 14:30 | Khenissi 12' (pen.), 74'; Bguir 48'; Bulbwa 80'; Mhirsi 90' | Soccerway report | | Stadium: Stade Olympique de Radès; Referee: Sadok Selmi |

| 7 November 2015 Round 7 | CA Bizertin | 1–3 | Espérance de Tunis | Bizerte |
| 14:30 | Mathlouthi 85' (pen.) | Soccerway report | Ben Youssef 40'; Khenissi 52'; Jlassi 88' | Stadium: Stade 15 Octobre; Referee: Haythem Kossai |

| 20 November 2015 Round 8 | Espérance de Tunis | 4–1 | Stade Tunisien | Tunis |
| 16:00 | Khenissi 10'; Bulbwa 25'; Ben Youssef 55'; Machani 86' | Soccerway report | Mohamed Soudani 35' | Stadium: Stade Olympique de Radès; Referee: Haythem Guirat |

| 16 December 2015 Round 9 | EO Sidi Bouzid | 0–2 | Espérance de Tunis | Sidi Bouzid |
| 14:00 | | Soccerway report | Khenissi 42' (pen.); Mbarki 71' | Stadium: Stade du 17 Décembre 2010; Referee: Mokhtar Dabbous |

| 20 December 2015 Round 10 | Espérance de Tunis | 2–1 | JS Kairouan | Tunis |
| 14:00 | Ben Youssef 45+3', 48' | Soccerway report | Ali Korbi 11' | Stadium: Stade El Menzah; Referee: Walid Jeridi |

| 24 December 2015 Round 11 | Étoile du Sahel | 3–0 | Espérance de Tunis | Sousse |
| 14:00 | Lahmar 30' (pen.), 35'; Akaichi 53' | Soccerway report | | Stadium: Stade Olympique de Sousse; Referee: Said Kordi |

| 27 December 2015 Round 12 | Espérance de Tunis | 2–1 | CS Sfaxien | Tunis |
| 14:00 | Dhaouadi 3'; Ben Youssef 51' | Soccerway report | Maaloul 8' (pen.) | Stadium: Stade El Menzah; Referee: Sadok Selmi |

| 30 December 2015 Round 13 | Espérance de Tunis | 1–2 | ES Zarzis | Tunis |
| 14:00 | Bguir 63' | Soccerway report | Messaadi 8'; Salhi 82' | Stadium: Stade El Menzah; Referee: Slim Belkhouas |

| 3 January 2016 Round 14 | Stade Gabèsien | 0–1 | Espérance de Tunis | Gabès |
| 13:00 | | Soccerway report | Rejaibi 16' | Stadium: Stade Municipal de Gabès; Referee: Haythem Kossaï |

| 6 January 2016 Round 15 | Espérance de Tunis | 3–0 | EGS Gafsa | Tunis |
| 13:00 | Rejaibi 43', 71'; Bguir 45' | Soccerway report | | Stadium: Stade El Menzah; Referee: Mohamed Amine Ben Naceur |

| 13 February 2016 Round 16 | Espérance de Tunis | 1–0 | AS Marsa | Tunis |
| 14:00 | Khenissi 52' (pen.) | Soccerway report | | Stadium: Stade El Menzah; Referee: Walid Bennani |

| 20 February 2016 Round 17 | ES Métlaoui | 1–2 | Espérance de Tunis | Métlaoui |
| 14:00 | Achref Zouaghi 90' | Soccerway report | Khenissi 26'; Ben Youssef 50' | Stadium: Stade Municipal de Métlaoui; Referee: Karim Khemiri |

| 28 February 2016 Round 18 | Espérance de Tunis | 2–1 | US Ben Guerdane | Tunis |
| 15:00 | Bguir 5', 25' | Soccerway report | Zoghlami 51' | Stadium: Stade Olympique de Radès; Referee: Wassim Ben Salah |

| 6 March 2016 Round 19 | CS Hammam-Lif | 0–1 | Espérance de Tunis | Tunis |
| 14:30 | | Soccerway report | Mbarki 66' | Stadium: Stade Bou Kornine; Referee: Mohamed Amine Ben Naceur |

| 3 April 2016 Round 20 | Espérance de Tunis | 2–1 | Club Africain | Tunis |
| 15:30 | Dhaouadi 45'; Jouini 79' | Soccerway report | Ayadi 35' | Stadium: Stade Olympique de Radès; Referee: Sadok Selmi |

| 14 April 2016 Round 21 | AS Kasserine | 0–4 | Espérance de Tunis | Kasserine |
| 15:30 | | Soccerway report | Jouini 13'; Ben Youssef 50'; Bguir 60'; Rejaibi 70' | Stadium: Stade de Kasserine; Referee: Haythem Guirat |

| 27 April 2016 Round 22 | Espérance de Tunis | 2–0 | CA Bizertin | Tunis |
| 16:00 | Jouini 5', 12' | Soccerway report | | Stadium: Stade Olympique de Radès; Referee: Slim Bellakhouas |

| 23 April 2016 Round 23 | Stade Tunisien | 0–0 | Espérance de Tunis | Tunis |
| 15:00 | | Soccerway report | | Stadium: Stade Chedli Zouiten; Referee: Wassim Ben Salah |

| 1 May 2016 Round 24 | Espérance de Tunis | 5–1 | EO Sidi Bouzid | Tunis |
| 16:00 | Bguir 16'; Mhirsi 17'; Jouini 27'; Rejaibi 63'; Yacoubi 78' | Soccerway report | Kamergi 55' | Stadium: Stade Olympique de Radès; Referee: Youssef Sraïri |

| 11 May 2016 Round 25 | JS Kairouan | 0–4 | Espérance de Tunis | Kairouan |
| 16:00 | | Soccerway report | Jouini 13'; Rejaibi 21'; Mhirsi 74'; Khenissi 90+1' | Stadium: Stade Ali Zouaoui; Referee: Karim Khemiri |

| 25 May 2016 Round 26 | Espérance de Tunis | 2–2 | Étoile du Sahel | Tunis |
| 16:30 | Bguir 30'; Khenissi 52' | Soccerway report | Lahmar 55' (pen.), 78' | Stadium: Stade Olympique de Radès; Referee: Mohamed Amine Ben Naceur |

| 22 May 2016 Round 27 | CS Sfaxien | 1–0 | Espérance de Tunis | Sfax |
| 16:00 | Oluwafemi 67' | Soccerway report | | Stadium: Stade Taïeb Mhiri; Referee: Mohamed Saïd Kordi |

| 29 May 2016 Round 28 | ES Zarzis | 1–2 | Espérance de Tunis | Sfax |
| 16:00 | Belgacem 81' (pen.) | Soccerway report | Bguir 29'; Rejaibi 67' | Stadium: Stade Taïeb Mhiri; Referee: Haythem Guirat |

| 9 June 2016 Round 29 | Espérance de Tunis | 2–0 | Stade Gabèsien | Tunis |
| 16:00 | Bguir 23' (pen.), 64' | Soccerway report | | Stadium: Stade Olympique de Radès; Referee: Wassim Ben Salah |

| 12 June 2016 Round 30 | EGS Gafsa | 0–0 | Espérance de Tunis | Gafsa |
| 16:00 | | Soccerway report | | Stadium: Stade du 7 Novembre; Referee: Sadok Selmi |

== 2015 Tunisian Cup ==
| 5 August 2015 Round of 16 | JS Soukra | 0–1 | Espérance de Tunis | Tunis |
| 16:00 | | Report | Ben Youssef 88' | Stadium: Stade de Borj Louzir; Referee: Walid Jeridi |

| 16 August 2015 Quarter-finals | CS Hammam-Lif | 2–1 (a.e.t.) | Espérance de Tunis | Tunis |
| 16:00 | Meskini 87'; Melliti 92' | Report | Eduok 11' | Stadium: Stade Bou Kornine; Referee: Mohamed Said Kordi |

== 2016 Tunisian Cup ==
| 30 January 2016 Round of 32 | US Ksour Essef | 0–4 | Espérance de Tunis | Ksour Essef |
| 13:30 | | Report | Jlassi 25' (pen.); Jouini 49'; Yaakoubi 63'; Mhirsi 88' | Stadium: Stade de Ksour Essef; Referee: Youssef Sraïri |

| 7 February 2016 Round of 16 | FS Gafsa-Ksar | 0–5 | Espérance de Tunis | Gafsa |
| 13:30 | | Report | Jouini 30', 45'; Mhirsi 74'; Khenissi 80' (pen.); Mbarki 90+2' | Stadium: Stade du 7 Novembre de Gafsa; Referee: Mejdi Belhaj Ali |

== 2015 Confederation Cup ==
=== Group stage ===
==== Group A ====
| Pos | Team | Pld | W | D | L | GF | GA | GD | Pts | Qualification | AHL | ESS | STA | EST |
|---|---|---|---|---|---|---|---|---|---|---|---|---|---|---|
| 1 | (Egypt) Al-Ahly | 6 | 4 | 1 | 1 | 6 | 1 | +5 | 13 | Advance to knockout stage | — | 1–0 | 1–0 | 3–0 |
| 2 | (Tunisia) Étoile du Sahel | 6 | 4 | 1 | 1 | 6 | 3 | +3 | 13 | Advance to knockout stage | 1–0 | — | 1–0 | 2–1 |
| 3 | (Mali) Stade Malien | 6 | 1 | 2 | 3 | 3 | 5 | −2 | 5 | | 0–0 | 1–1 | — | 0–1 |
| 4 | (Tunisia) Espérance de Tunis | 6 | 1 | 0 | 5 | 3 | 9 | −6 | 3 | | 0–1 | 0–1 | 1–2 | — |

Source: CAF
Rules for classification: Group stage tiebreakers

| 28 June 2015 1 | Al-Ahly (Egypt) | 3–0 | (Tunisia) Espérance de Tunis | Suez |
| 22:00 UTC+2 | Said 20', 58'; Zakaria 90' | Report | | Stadium: Suez Stadium; Referee: Néant Alioum (Cameroon) |

| 11 July 2015 2 | Espérance de Tunis (Tunisia) | 0–1 | (Tunisia) Étoile du Sahel | Tunis |
| 22:00 UTC+1 | | Report | Jemal 49' | Stadium: Stade Olympique de Radès; Referee: Eric Otogo-Castane (Gabon) |

| 25 July 2015 3 | Espérance de Tunis (Tunisia) | 1–2 | (Mali) Stade Malien | Tunis |
| 19:45 UTC+1 | Ben Youssef 11' | Report | Sissoko 5'; Ma. Coulibaly 48' | Stadium: Stade Olympique de Radès; Referee: Janny Sikazwe (Zambia) |

| 9 August 2015 4 | Stade Malien (Mali) | 0–1 | (Tunisia) Espérance de Tunis | Bamako |
| 16:30 UTC±0 | | Report | Eduok 24' | Stadium: Stade Modibo Kéïta; Referee: Victor Gomes (South Africa) |
Note: The Stade Malien v Espérance de Tunis match was suspended at the 49th minute due to heavy rain, and was resumed on 10 August 2015, 16:30 UTC±0, from the point of abandonment.

| 22 August 2015 5 | Espérance de Tunis (Tunisia) | 0–1 | (Egypt) Al-Ahly | Tunis |
| 19:00 UTC+1 | | Report | Antwi 5' | Stadium: Stade Olympique de Radès; Referee: Hamada Nampiandraza (Madagascar) |

| 12 September 2015 6 | Étoile du Sahel (Tunisia) | 2–1 | (Tunisia) Espérance de Tunis | Sousse |
| 19:30 UTC+1 | Bounedjah 90' (pen.), 90+3' | Report | Jouini 25' | Stadium: Stade Olympique de Sousse; Referee: Mehdi Abid Charef (Algeria) |

== 2016 Confederation Cup ==
=== First round ===
| 12 March 2016 First leg | Renaissance (Chad) | 0–2 | (Tunisia) Espérance de Tunis | N'Djamena |
| 15:50 UTC+1 | | Report | Khenissi 13'; Chaalali 65' | Stadium: Stade Omnisports Idriss Mahamat Ouya; Referee: Israel Mujuni (Tanzania) |

| 19 March 2016 Second leg | Espérance de Tunis (Tunisia) | 5–0 | (Chad) Renaissance | Tunis |
| 15:00 UTC+1 | Khenissi 4'; Mhirsi 12'; Jelassi 52', 87' (pen.); Jouini 59' | Report | | Stadium: Stade Olympique de Radès; Referee: Mustapha Ghorbal (Algeria) |

=== Second round ===
| 10 April 2016 First leg | Azam (Tanzania) | 2–1 | (Tunisia) Espérance de Tunis | Dar es Salaam |
| 15:15 UTC+3 | Musa 69'; Singano 70' | Report | Jouini 34' | Stadium: Chamazi Stadium; Referee: Daniel Bennett (South Africa) |

| 19 April 2016 Second leg | Espérance de Tunis (Tunisia) | 3–0 | (Tanzania) Azam | Tunis |
| 19:00 UTC+1 | Bguir 47'; Jouini 63'; Ben Youssef 81' | Report | | Stadium: Stade Olympique de Radès; Referee: Rédouane Jiyed (Morocco) |

=== Play-off round ===
| 7 May 2016 First leg | MO Béjaïa (Algeria) | 0–0 | (Tunisia) Espérance de Tunis | Béjaïa |
| 18:00 UTC+1 | | Report | | Stadium: Stade de l'Unité Maghrébine; Referee: Malang Diedhiou (Senegal) |

| 17 May 2016 Second leg | Espérance de Tunis (Tunisia) | 1–1 | (Algeria) MO Béjaïa | Tunis |
| 18:00 UTC+1 | Chaalali 29' | Report | Ndoye 33' | Stadium: Stade Olympique de Radès; Referee: Gehad Grisha (Egypt) |

== Squad information ==
=== Playing statistics ===
| No. | Pos | Nat | Player | Total | | Ligue 1 | | Tunisian Cup | | Confederation Cup | |
| No. | Pos | Nat | Player | Apps | Goals | Apps | Goals | Apps | Goals | Apps | Goals |
Goalkeepers
| 1 | GK | (Tunisia) TUN | Moez Ben Cherifia | 32 | 0 | 20 | 0 | 1 | 0 | 11 | 0 |
| 23 | GK | (Tunisia) TUN | Sami Helal | 4 | 0 | 2 | 0 | 2 | 0 | 0 | 0 |
| 23 | GK | (Tunisia) TUN | Ali Jemal | 7 | 0 | 7 | 0 | 0 | 0 | 0 | 0 |
| 16 | GK | (Tunisia) TUN | Wassim Karoui | 2 | 0 | 1 | 0 | 1 | 0 | 0 | 0 |
Defenders
| 5 | DF | (Tunisia) TUN | Chamseddine Dhaouadi | 35 | 2 | 26 | 2 | 2 | 0 | 7 | 0 |
| 30 | DF | (Tunisia) TUN | Mohamed Ali Yacoubi | 30 | 2 | 15 | 1 | 4 | 1 | 11 | 0 |
| 13 | DF | (Tunisia) TUN | Ali Machani | 27 | 1 | 20 | 1 | 1 | 0 | 6 | 0 |
| 6 | DF | (Mali) MLI | Ichaka Diarra | 2 | 0 | 2 | 0 | 0 | 0 | 0 | 0 |
| 17 | DF | (Tunisia) TUN | Sameh Derbali | 7 | 0 | 1 | 0 | 2 | 0 | 4 | 0 |
| 24 | DF | (Tunisia) TUN | Iheb Mbarki | 36 | 3 | 27 | 2 | 1 | 1 | 8 | 0 |
| 28 | DF | (Tunisia) TUN | Amine Nefzi | 16 | 0 | 6 | 0 | 2 | 0 | 8 | 0 |
| | DF | (Tunisia) TUN | Fedi Arfaoui | 0 | 0 | 0 | 0 | 0 | 0 | 0 | 0 |
| | DF | (Tunisia) TUN | Hamza Letifi | 0 | 0 | 0 | 0 | 0 | 0 | 0 | 0 |
| | DF | (Tunisia) TUN | Hatem Bejaoui | 2 | 0 | 0 | 0 | 0 | 0 | 2 | 0 |
| 12 | DF | (Tunisia) TUN | Khalil Chemmam | 22 | 0 | 18 | 0 | 3 | 0 | 1 | 0 |
| 2 | DF | (Tunisia) TUN | Ali Abdi | 0 | 0 | 0 | 0 | 0 | 0 | 0 | 0 |
| 26 | DF | (Tunisia) TUN | Houcine Rabii | 24 | 0 | 16 | 0 | 2 | 0 | 6 | 0 |
Midfielders
| 4 | MF | (Tunisia) TUN | Hocine Ragued | 43 | 1 | 30 | 1 | 3 | 0 | 10 | 0 |
| 15 | MF | (Ivory Coast) CIV | Fousseny Coulibaly | 38 | 0 | 28 | 0 | 4 | 0 | 6 | 0 |
| 6 | MF | (Tunisia) TUN | Monther Guesmi | 0 | 0 | 0 | 0 | 0 | 0 | 0 | 0 |
| 25 | MF | (Tunisia) TUN | Ghailene Chaalali | 26 | 2 | 16 | 0 | 2 | 0 | 8 | 2 |
| | MF | (Tunisia) TUN | Wassim Naghmouchi | 6 | 0 | 0 | 0 | 0 | 0 | 6 | 0 |
| 19 | MF | (Tunisia) TUN | Edem Rjaibi | 31 | 7 | 26 | 7 | 1 | 0 | 4 | 0 |
| | MF | (Mali) MLI | Abdoulaye Sissoko | 3 | 0 | 3 | 0 | 0 | 0 | 0 | 0 |
| 8 | MF | (Tunisia) TUN | Idriss Mhirsi | 41 | 8 | 27 | 5 | 4 | 2 | 10 | 1 |
| 18 | MF | (Tunisia) TUN | Saad Bguir | 32 | 13 | 30 | 12 | 0 | 0 | 2 | 1 |
| 10 | MF | (Tunisia) TUN | Elyas Jelassi | 21 | 4 | 12 | 1 | 2 | 1 | 7 | 2 |
| | MF | (Guinea) GUI | Daouda Camara | 0 | 0 | 0 | 0 | 0 | 0 | 0 | 0 |
| 7 | MF | (Nigeria) NGR | Bernard Bulbwa | 18 | 2 | 11 | 2 | 3 | 0 | 4 | 0 |
| 20 | MF | (Tunisia) TUN | Chaker Rguiî | 19 | 0 | 10 | 0 | 2 | 0 | 7 | 0 |
Forwards
| 11 | FW | (Tunisia) TUN | Fakhreddine Ben Youssef | 30 | 11 | 21 | 8 | 2 | 1 | 7 | 2 |
| 22 | FW | (Mali) MLI | Saliou Guindo | 1 | 0 | 1 | 0 | 0 | 0 | 0 | 0 |
| 29 | FW | (Tunisia) TUN | Taha Yassine Khenissi | 31 | 15 | 25 | 12 | 2 | 1 | 4 | 2 |
| 14 | FW | (Tunisia) TUN | Haythem Jouini | 31 | 13 | 17 | 6 | 4 | 3 | 10 | 4 |
| | FW | (Tunisia) TUN | Bilel Mejri | 1 | 0 | 1 | 0 | 0 | 0 | 0 | 0 |
| 21 | FW | (Nigeria) NGR | Emem Eduok | 19 | 2 | 11 | 0 | 3 | 1 | 5 | 1 |
| | FW | (Tunisia) TUN | Zied Ounalli | 1 | 0 | 1 | 0 | 0 | 0 | 0 | 0 |
Players transferred out during the season

Last updated: 8 June 2020

=== Goalscorers ===
Includes all competitive matches. The list is sorted alphabetically by surname when total goals are equal.

| No. | Nat. | Player | Pos. | L 1 | TC | CC 3 | TOTAL |
|---|---|---|---|---|---|---|---|
| 29 | (Tunisia) | Taha Yassine Khenissi | FW | 12 | 1 | 2 | 15 |
| 14 | (Tunisia) | Haythem Jouini | FW | 6 | 3 | 4 | 13 |
| 18 | (Tunisia) | Saad Bguir | MF | 12 | 0 | 1 | 13 |
| 11 | (Tunisia) | Fakhreddine Ben Youssef | FW | 8 | 1 | 2 | 11 |
| 8 | (Tunisia) | Idriss Mhirsi | MF | 5 | 2 | 1 | 8 |
| 19 | (Tunisia) | Edem Rjaibi | MF | 7 | 0 | 0 | 7 |
| 10 | (Tunisia) | Elyès Jlassi | MF | 1 | 1 | 2 | 4 |
| 24 | (Tunisia) | Iheb Mbarki | DF | 2 | 1 | 0 | 3 |
| 21 | (Nigeria) | Emem Eduok | FW | 0 | 1 | 1 | 2 |
| 7 | (Nigeria) | Bernard Bulbwa | FW | 2 | 0 | 0 | 2 |
| 30 | (Tunisia) | Mohamed Ali Yacoubi | DF | 1 | 1 | 0 | 2 |
| 25 | (Tunisia) | Ghailene Chaalali | MF | 0 | 0 | 2 | 2 |
| 5 | (Tunisia) | Chamseddine Dhaouadi | DF | 1 | 0 | 0 | 1 |
| 4 | (Tunisia) | Hocine Ragued | MF | 1 | 0 | 0 | 1 |
| 13 | (Tunisia) | Ali Machani | DF | 1 | 0 | 0 | 1 |
| Own Goals | | | | 0 | 0 | 0 | 0 |
| Totals | | | | 60 | 11 | 15 | 86 |

== Transfers ==
=== In ===
| Date | Pos | Player | From club | Transfer fee | Source |
|---|---|---|---|---|---|
| 2 April 2015 | FW | (Nigeria) Bernard Bulbwa | (Nigeria) Shuttle SA | Free transfer | |
| 5 June 2015 | MF | (Tunisia) Chaker Rguiî | ES Zarzis | Free transfer | |
| 22 June 2015 | MF | (Tunisia) Elyès Jlassi | Stade Tunisien | Free transfer | |
| 1 July 2015 | MF | (Tunisia) Hossein Rebai | ES Zarzis | Free transfer | |
| 1 July 2015 | DF | (Tunisia) Khalil Chemmam | (Portugal) Vitória de Guimarães | Free transfer | |
| 1 July 2015 | DF | (Mali) Ichaka Diarra | (Mali) Djoliba AC | Free transfer | |
| 4 July 2015 | DF | (Tunisia) Ali Machani | CA Bizertin | Free transfer | |
| 4 July 2015 | MF | (Tunisia) Adem Rejaibi | CA Bizertin | Free transfer | |
| 11 July 2015 | FW | (Tunisia) Fakhreddine Ben Youssef | (France) FC Metz | Free transfer | |
| 5 August 2015 | FW | (Tunisia) Taha Yassine Khenissi | CS Sfaxien | Free transfer | |
| 17 August 2015 | MF | (Mali) Abdoulaye Sissoko | (Mali) Stade Malien | Free transfer | |
| 18 August 2015 | MF | (Tunisia) Saad Bguir | Stade Gabèsien | Free transfer | |
| 15 September 2015 | FW | (Mali) Saliou Guindo | (Ivory Coast) ASEC Mimosas | Free transfer | |
| 13 January 2016 | GK | (Tunisia) Ali Jemal | US Ben Guerdane | Free transfer | |
| 15 January 2016 | MF | (Tunisia) Mondher Guesmi | EO Sidi Bouzid | Free transfer | |
| 15 January 2016 | MF | (Benin) Shamsedeene Shawna | (Nigeria) Shooting Stars | Free transfer | |

=== Out ===
| Date | Pos | Player | To club | Transfer fee | Source |
|---|---|---|---|---|---|
| 12 June 2015 | GK | (Tunisia) Ali Jemal | US Ben Guerdane | Free transfer | |
| 28 June 2015 | FW | (Tunisia) Oussama Darragi | (Saudi Arabia) Al-Raed FC | Free transfer | |
| 7 July 2015 | MF | (Tunisia) Chedly Ghrab | CA Bizertin | Free transfer | |
| 7 July 2015 | MF | (Tunisia) Seddik Mejri | CA Bizertin | Free transfer | |
| 15 July 2015 | MF | (Tunisia) Hassen Harbaoui | CS Sfaxien | Free transfer | |
| 24 July 2015 | DF | (Tunisia) Marouane Sahraoui | (France) FC Metz | Free transfer | |
| 30 July 2015 | DF | (Ghana) Harrison Afful | (United States) Columbus Crew | Free transfer | |
| 30 July 2015 | MF | (Brazil) Magno Cruz | (Japan) Cerezo Osaka | Free transfer | |
| 13 August 2015 | DF | (Tunisia) Larbi Jabeur | (Oman) Dhofar Club | Free transfer | |
| 13 August 2015 | MF | (Tunisia) Khaled Gharsellaoui | (Oman) Dhofar Club | Free transfer | |
| 15 August 2015 | MF | (Tunisia) Safouane Ben Salem | JS Kairouan | Free transfer | |
| 17 August 2015 | FW | (Tunisia) Ahmed Akaichi | Étoile Sportive du Sahel | Free transfer | |
| 15 September 2015 | MF | (Tunisia) Hatem Bejaoui | (Saudi Arabia) Damac FC | Free transfer | |
