= 2014–15 Espérance Sportive de Tunis season =

Season of football team

Espérance Sportive de Tunis
2014–15 season
- President: Hamdi Meddeb
- Head coach: Sébastien Desabre (until 17 August 2014); Khaled Ben Yahia (from 17 August 2014) (until 8 February 2015); José Morais (from 8 February 2015)
- Stadium: Stade de Radès
- Ligue 1: 3rd
- Tunisian Cup: Round of 32
- Champions League: Group stage
- Confederation Cup: Play-off round
- Top goalscorer: League: Ahmed Akaichi (10 goals); All: Ahmed Akaichi (14 goals)

In the 2014–15 season, Espérance Sportive de Tunis competed in the Ligue 1 for the 60th season, as well as the Tunisian Cup. It was their 60th consecutive season in the top flight of Tunisian football. They competed in Ligue 1, the Champions League, the Confederation Cup and the Tunisian Cup.

== Squad list ==
Players and squad numbers last updated on 15 November 2014.
Note: Flags indicate national team as has been defined under FIFA eligibility rules. Players may hold more than one non-FIFA nationality.

No.	Nat.	Position	Name	Date of Birth (Age)	Signed from
Goalkeepers
1	(Tunisia)	GK	Moez Ben Cherifia	24 June 1991 (aged 23)	(Tunisia) Youth system
16	(Tunisia)	GK	Ali Jmal	9 June 1990 (aged 24)	(Tunisia) Youth system
32	(Tunisia)	GK	Sami Hlel	19 October 1988 (aged 26)	(Tunisia) Stade Gabèsien
Defenders
3	(Tunisia)		Larbi Jabeur	25 May 1985 (aged 29)	(Tunisia) CA Bizertin
5	(Tunisia)		Chamseddine Dhaouadi	16 January 1987 (aged 27)	(Tunisia) Étoile Sportive du Sahel
17	(Tunisia)		Sameh Derbali	23 November 1986 (aged 28)	(Tunisia) Youth system
20	(Tunisia)		Mohamed Ben Mansour	19 July 1988 (aged 26)	(Tunisia) Youth system
21	(Tunisia)		Mohamed Ali Yacoubi	5 October 1990 (aged 24)	(Tunisia) Club Africain
24	(Tunisia)		Iheb Mbarki	14 February 1992 (aged 22)	(France) Thonon Évian
28	(Tunisia)		Mohamed Amine Nefzi	8 August 1992 (aged 22)	(Tunisia) CS Hammam-Lif
29	(Tunisia)		Ahmed Brahim Naili	6 July 1993 (aged 21)	(Tunisia) Youth system
2	(Tunisia)		Ali Abdi	20 December 1993 (aged 21)	(Tunisia) Stade Tunisien
Midfielders
4	(Tunisia)		Hocine Ragued	11 February 1983 (aged 31)	(Turkey) Kardemir Karabükspor
10	(Tunisia)		Oussama Darragi	3 April 1987 (aged 27)	(Switzerland) FC Sion
18	(Tunisia)		Khaled Gharsellaoui	29 July 1990 (aged 24)	(Tunisia) EGS Gafsa
	(Tunisia)		Moez Abboud	18 July 1996 (aged 18)	(Tunisia) Youth system
26	(Ghana)		Harrison Afful	24 June 1986 (aged 28)	(Ghana) West African Football Academy
23	(Tunisia)		Chamseddine Samti	12 May 1996 (aged 18)	(Tunisia) Youth system
	(Tunisia)		Wassim Naghmouchi	17 April 1996 (aged 18)	(Tunisia) Youth system
27	(Tunisia)		Safouane Ben Salem	26 February 1992 (aged 22)	(Tunisia) Youth system
	(Ivory Coast)		Fousseny Coulibaly	10 August 1989 (aged 25)	(Tunisia) US Monastir
Forwards
7	(Tunisia)		Mohamed Ali Mhadhbi	7 August 1990 (aged 24)	(Tunisia) CA Bizertin
8	(Tunisia)		Idriss Mhirsi	21 February 1994 (aged 20)	(Tunisia) Youth system
9	(Tunisia)		Ahmed Akaichi	23 February 1989 (aged 25)	(Germany) FC Ingolstadt 04
14	(Tunisia)		Haythem Jouini	7 May 1993 (aged 21)	(Tunisia) Youth system
15	(Cameroon)		Yannick N'Djeng	11 March 1990 (aged 24)	(Switzerland) FC Sion
25	(Guinea)		Daouda Camara	12 March 1994 (aged 20)	(Guinea) Hafia FC
	(Nigeria)		Emem Eduok	31 January 1994 (aged 20)	(Nigeria) Dolphins
	(Tunisia)		Ghailene Chaalali	28 February 1994 (aged 20)	(Tunisia) Youth system
	(Brazil)		Magno Cruz	20 May 1988 (aged 26)	(Brazil) Red Bull Bragantino
	(Tunisia)		Hassen Harbaoui	3 October 1987 (aged 27)	(Tunisia) CA Bizertin

== Competitions ==
=== Overview ===
Competition	Record								Started round	Final position / round	First match	Last match
Competition	G	W	D	L	GF	GA	GD	Win %	Started round	Final position / round	First match	Last match
Ligue 1	30	17	9	4	52	21	+31	56.67	—N/a	3rd	14 August 2014	31 May 2015
Tunisian Cup	1	1	0	0	3	1	+2	100.00	Round of 32		21 February 2015	
2014 Champions League	3	1	1	1	3	3	+0	33.33	Group stage		26 July 2014	24 August 2014
2015 Champions League	4	3	0	1	6	3	+3	75.00	First round	Second round	15 March 2015	3 May 2015
Confederation Cup	2	1	1	0	5	1	+4	50.00	Play-off round		17 May 2015	6 June 2015
Total	40	23	11	6	69	29	+40	57.50				

Updated to match played 3 June 2019
Source: Competitions

== League table ==
Pos	Team	Pld	W	D	L	GF	GA	GD	Pts	Qualification or relegation
1	Club Africain (C)	30	20	5	5	50	18	+32	65	Qualification to the 2016 CAF Champions League
2	Étoile du Sahel	30	19	7	4	47	17	+30	63 (Note: 1 point was deducted from Étoile du Sahel for refusing to play the Round 20 game against Club de Hammam-Lif.)	Qualification to the 2016 CAF Champions League
3	Espérance de Tunis	30	17	9	4	52	21	+31	60	Qualification to the 2016 CAF Confederation Cup
4	Club Sfaxien	30	11	14	5	35	21	+14	47	
5	Espérance de Zarzis	30	11	12	7	35	25	+10	45	

Source: Ligue 1
Rules for classification: 1) points; 2) goal difference; 3) number of goals scored.
(C) Champions

=== Results summary ===
Overall								Home						Away					
Pld	W	D	L	GF	GA	GD	Pts	W	D	L	GF	GA	GD	W	D	L	GF	GA	GD
30	17	9	4	52	21	+31	60	12	2	1	39	10	+29	5	7	3	13	11	+2

Last updated: 22 April 2018.
Source: Competitive matches

=== Results by round ===
Round	1	2	3	4	5	6	7	8	9	10	11	12	13	14	15	16	17	18	19	20	21	22	23	24	25	26	27	28	29	30
Ground	H	A	H	A	H	A	A	H	A	H	A	H	A	H	A	A	H	A	H	A	H	H	A	H	A	H	A	H	A	H
Result	L	D	D	W	W	L	D	W	D	W	W	W	D	D	D	W	W	W	W	L	W	W	W	W	D	W	D	W	L	W
Position	12	12	11	10	5	8	6	5	6	4	4	3	4	4	4	4	4	3	2	3	2	2	2	2	2	2	2	2	3	3

Source: Competitive matches
A = Away; H = Home; W = Win; D = Draw; L = Loss

=== Matches ===
Win Draw Loss

14 August 2014 Round 1	Espérance de Tunis	0–1	CS Hammam-Lif	Tunis
17:00		Soccerway report	Diakité 89'	Stadium: Stade Olympique de Radès; Referee: Anis Ben Hassen

19 August 2014 Round 2	JS Kairouan	1–1	Espérance de Tunis	Kairouan
16:30	Aouichi 59'	Soccerway report	Darragi 17' (pen.)	Stadium: Stade Hamda Laouani; Referee: Haythem Kossai

27 August 2014 Round 3	Espérance de Tunis	0–0	US Monastir	Tunis
16:30		Soccerway report		Stadium: Stade Olympique de Radès; Referee: Khaled Guizani

31 August 2014 Round 4	CA Bizertin	1–3	Espérance de Tunis	Bizerte
16:00	Darragi 28'	Soccerway report	Mbarki 67'; Afful 70', 74'	Stadium: Stade 15 Octobre; Referee: Khaled Guizani

27 August 2014 Round 5	Espérance de Tunis	7–1	AS Gabès	Tunis
15:30	Darragi 29', 36'; Dhaouadi 32', 78'; Akaichi 46', 63'; Jouini 80'	Soccerway report	Cheikh Touré 49'	Stadium: Stade Olympique de Radès; Referee: Ameur Chouchane

21 September 2014 Round 6	AS Marsa	1–0	Espérance de Tunis	Tunis
15:30	Yahia 1'	Soccerway report		Stadium: Stade Abdelaziz Chtioui; Referee: Nasrallah Jaouadi

3 October 2014 Round 7	ES Zarzis	0–0	Espérance de Tunis	Zarzis
15:00		Soccerway report		Stadium: Stade Jlidi; Referee: Haythem Kossai

19 October 2014 Round 8	Espérance de Tunis	1–0	ES Métlaoui	Tunis
14:30	Jabeur 11'	Soccerway report		Stadium: Stade El Menzah; Referee: Anis Ben Hassen

31 October 2014 Round 9	Stade Tunisien	2–2	Espérance de Tunis	Tunis
14:30	Marzouki 71'; Aouadhi 78' (pen.)	Soccerway report	Coulibaly 62'; Harbaoui 82' (pen.)	Stadium: Stade El Menzah; Referee: Slim Jedidi

9 November 2014 Round 10	Espérance de Tunis	1–0	Étoile Sportive du Sahel	Tunis
14:00	Chaalali 71'	Soccerway report		Stadium: Stade Olympique de Radès; Referee: Sadok Selmi

30 November 2014 Round 11	AS Djerba	0–1	Espérance de Tunis	Djerba
14:00		Soccerway report	N'Djeng 73'	Stadium: Stade de Houmt Souk; Referee: Ameur Chouchane

7 December 2014 Round 12	Espérance de Tunis	2–1	CS Sfaxien	Tunis
14:00	Akaichi 23', 78'	Soccerway report	Maâloul 15' (pen.)	Stadium: Stade Olympique de Radès; Referee: Nasrallah Jaouadi

15 December 2014 Round 13	Stade Gabèsien	1–1	Espérance de Tunis	Gabès
14:00	Abdi 53' (pen.)	Soccerway report	Akaichi 28'	Stadium: Stade Municipal de Gabès; Referee: Khaled Guizani

24 December 2014 Round 14	Espérance de Tunis	2–2	Club Africain	Tunis
14:00	N'Djeng 80', 88'	Soccerway report	Djabou 15'; Belaïd 57'	Stadium: Stade Olympique de Radès; Referee: Haythem Guirat

28 December 2014 Round 15	EGS Gafsa	0–0	Espérance de Tunis	Gafsa
14:00		Soccerway report		Stadium: Stade du 7 Novembre de Gafsa; Referee: Mohamed Saïd Kordi

14 February 2015 Round 16	CS Hammam-Lif	0–1	Espérance de Tunis	Tunis
14:00		Soccerway report	Mhirsi 51'	Stadium: Stade Bou Kornine; Referee: Amir Loussaief

18 February 2015 Round 17	Espérance de Tunis	1–0	JS Kairouan	Tunis
14:00	Eduok 78'	Soccerway report		Stadium: Stade Olympique de Radès; Referee: Said Kordi

28 February 2015 Round 18	US Monastir	1–2	Espérance de Tunis	Monastir
14:00	Ben Amor 90+1'	Soccerway report	Akaichi 49'; N'Djeng 90+4'	Stadium: Stade Mustapha Ben Jannet; Referee: Mohamed Ben Hassana

4 March 2015 Round 19	Espérance de Tunis	1–0	CA Bizertin	Tunis
14:00	Akaichi 29'	Soccerway report		Stadium: Stade Olympique de Radès; Referee: Haythem Kossai

8 March 2015 Round 20	AS Gabès	2–0	Espérance de Tunis	Gabès
14:00	Hemizi 22'; N'dior 26'	Soccerway report		Stadium: Stade Municipal de Gabès; Referee: Youssef Srari

19 March 2015 Round 21	Espérance de Tunis	3–1	AS Marsa	Tunis
14:00	Eduok 45+3', 90+3'; Akaichi 90'	Soccerway report	15' Laabidi	Stadium: Stade Olympique de Radès; Referee: Haythem Guirat

22 March 2015 Round 22	Espérance de Tunis	2–1	ES Zarzis	Tunis
14:00	Magno Cruz 4'; Akaichi 67'	Soccerway report	Rguiî 17'	Stadium: Stade Olympique de Radès; Referee: Yacine Harrouch

8 April 2015 Round 23	ES Métlaoui	0–1	Espérance de Tunis	Métlaoui
14:30		Soccerway report	45+3' Jouini	Stadium: Stade municipal de Métlaoui; Referee: Amir Loussaief

12 April 2015 Round 24	Espérance de Tunis	4–1	Stade Tunisien	Tunis
14:30	Yacoubi 37'; Darragi 70'; Chaalali 80'; N'Djeng 90'	Soccerway report	Alex Somian 21'	Stadium: Stade Olympique de Radès; Referee: Maher Harrabi

23 April 2015 Round 25	Étoile Sportive du Sahel	1–1	Espérance de Tunis	Sousse
14:30	Mouihbi 26' (pen.)	Soccerway report	Jouini 46' (pen.)	Stadium: Stade Olympique de Sousse; Referee: Slim Belkhouas

26 April 2015 Round 26	Espérance de Tunis	5–0	AS Djerba	Tunis
15:00	Jabeur 5'; Yacoubi 55'; Akaichi 73'; Darragi 76', 90'	Soccerway report		Stadium: Stade Olympique de Radès; Referee: Mohamed Chaabane

6 May 2015 Round 27	CS Sfaxien	0–0	Espérance de Tunis	Sfax
16:00		Soccerway report		Stadium: Stade Taïeb Mhiri; Referee: Haythem Kossai

9 May 2015 Round 28	Espérance de Tunis	6–1	Stade Gabèsien	Tunis
16:00	N'Djeng 2' (pen.); Jouini 13'; Eduok 27', 71', 74'; Ragued 51'	Soccerway report	76' Fouzaï	Stadium: Stade Olympique de Radès; Referee: Mohamed Ben Hassana

12 May 2015 Round 29	Club Africain	1–0	Espérance de Tunis	Tunis
16:00	Miniaoui 42'	Soccerway report		Stadium: Stade Olympique de Radès; Referee: Yacine Harrouch

31 May 2015 Round 30	Espérance de Tunis	4–1	EGS Gafsa	Tunis
16:00	Mhirsi 31' (pen.); Harbaoui 65'; Eduok 75'; Khemiri 84'	Soccerway report	Nafti 78' (pen.)	Stadium: Stade El Menzah; Referee: Walid Badri

== Tunisian Cup ==
21 February 2015 Round of 32	CS Menzel Bouzelfa	1–3	Espérance de Tunis	Tunis
14:00	Rhaimi 88'	Report	Akaichi 45+1', 89'; Aboud 58'	Stadium: Stade Chedly Zouiten; Referee: Rochdi Guezguez

== 2014 CAF Champions League ==
=== Group stage ===
==== Group B ====
Pos	Team	Pld	W	D	L	GF	GA	GD	Pts		CSS	ESS	EST	AHB
1	(Tunisia) CS Sfaxien	6	3	2	1	8	5	+3	11	Advance to knockout stage	—	1–1	1–0	3–1
2	(Algeria) ES Sétif	6	2	4	0	9	6	+3	10	Advance to knockout stage	1–1	—	2–2	1–1
3	(Tunisia) Espérance de Tunis	6	2	1	3	8	9	−1	7		2–1	1–2	—	1–0
4	(Libya) Al-Ahly Benghazi	6	1	1	4	5	10	−5	4		0–1	0–2	3–2	—

Source: CAF
Rules for classification: Group stage tiebreakers

26 July 2014 Matchday 4	CS Sfaxien (Tunisia)	1–0	(Tunisia) Espérance de Tunis	Sfax
22:00 UTC+1	Moncer 77'	Report		Stadium: Stade Taïeb Mhiri; Referee: Gehad Grisha (Egypt)

9 August 2014 Matchday 5	ES Sétif (Algeria)	2–2	(Tunisia) Espérance de Tunis	Sétif
20:30 UTC+1	Djahnit 29' (pen.), 50'	Report	Akaïchi 7', 72'	Stadium: Stade 8 Mai 1945; Referee: Noumandiez Doué (Ivory Coast)

24 August 2014 Matchday 6	Espérance de Tunis (Tunisia)	1–0	(Libya) Al-Ahly Benghazi	Tunis
19:00 UTC+1	Jerbi 70' (pen.)	Report		Stadium: Stade Olympique de Radès; Referee: Janny Sikazwe (Zambia)

== 2015 CAF Champions League ==
=== First round ===
15 March 2015 First leg	Cosmos de Bafia (Cameroon)	0–1	(Tunisia) Espérance de Tunis	Douala
15:30 UTC+1		Report	Afful 89'	Stadium: Stade de la Réunification; Referee: Hélder Martins de Carvalho (Angola)

5 April 2015 Second leg	Espérance de Tunis (Tunisia)	3–1	(Cameroon) Cosmos de Bafia	Tunis
17:00 UTC+1	N'Djeng 32' (pen.), 44' (pen.); Chaalali 67'	Report	Chaalali 28' (o.g.)	Stadium: Stade Olympique de Radès; Referee: Mahamadou Keita (Mali)

=== Second round ===
18 April 2015 First leg	Al-Merrikh (Sudan)	1–0	(Tunisia) Espérance de Tunis	Omdurman
20:00 UTC+3	Yousif 24' (pen.)	Report		Stadium: Al-Merrikh Stadium; Referee: Joshua Bondo (Botswana)

3 May 2015 Second leg	Espérance de Tunis (Tunisia)	2–1	(Sudan) Al-Merrikh	Tunis
16:00 UTC+1	N'Djeng 69'; Jabeur 90+1'	Report	Abdalla 14'	Stadium: Stade Olympique de Radès; Referee: Daniel Bennett (South Africa)

== CAF Confederation Cup ==
=== Play-off round ===
17 May 2015 First leg	Espérance de Tunis (Tunisia)	4–0	(Ghana) Hearts of Oak	Tunis
18:00 UTC+1	Eduok 12', 58'; Afful 74'; Chaalali 80'	Report		Stadium: Stade Olympique de Radès; Referee: Gehad Grisha (Egypt)

6 June 2015 Second leg	Hearts of Oak (Ghana)	1–1	(Tunisia) Espérance de Tunis	Accra
15:00 UTC±0	Mensah 3'	Report	Naghmouchi 89'	Stadium: Accra Sports Stadium; Referee: Bakary Gassama (Gambia)

== Squad information ==
=== Playing statistics ===
No.	Pos	Nat	Player	Total		Ligue 1		Tunisian Cup		Champions League		Confederation Cup	
No.	Pos	Nat	Player	Apps	Goals	Apps	Goals	Apps	Goals	Apps	Goals	Apps	Goals
Goalkeepers
1	GK	(Tunisia) TUN	Moez Ben Cherifia	27	0	27	0	0	0	0	0	0	0
16	GK	(Tunisia) TUN	Ali Jmal	1	0	1	0	0	0	0	0	0	0
32	GK	(Tunisia) TUN	Sami Helal	5	0	5	0	0	0	0	0	0	0
Defenders
3	DF	(Tunisia) TUN	Larbi Jabeur	20	2	20	2	0	0	0	0	0	0
5	DF	(Tunisia) TUN	Chamseddine Dhaouadi	17	2	17	2	0	0	0	0	0	0
17	DF	(Tunisia) TUN	Sameh Derbali	18	0	18	0	0	0	0	0	0	0
20	DF	(Tunisia) TUN	Mohamed Ben Mansour	6	0	6	0	0	0	0	0	0	0
21	DF	(Tunisia) TUN	Mohamed Ali Yacoubi	22	2	22	2	0	0	0	0	0	0
24	DF	(Tunisia) TUN	Iheb Mbarki	13	1	13	1	0	0	0	0	0	0
28	DF	(Tunisia) TUN	Mohamed Amine Nefzi	4	0	4	0	0	0	0	0	0	0
29	DF	(Tunisia) TUN	Ahmed Brahim Naili	0	0	0	0	0	0	0	0	0	0
2	DF	(Tunisia) TUN	Ali Abdi	11	0	11	0	0	0	0	0	0	0
	DF	(Tunisia) TUN	Hatem Bejaoui	13	0	13	0	0	0	0	0	0	0
Midfielders
4	MF	(Tunisia) TUN	Hocine Ragued	29	1	29	1	0	0	0	0	0	0
7	MF	(Tunisia) TUN	Mohamed Ali Mhadhebi	4	0	4	0	0	0	0	0	0	0
10	MF	(Tunisia) TUN	Oussama Darragi	14	6	14	6	0	0	0	0	0	0
18	MF	(Tunisia) TUN	Khaled Gharsellaoui	5	0	5	0	0	0	0	0	0	0
	MF	(Tunisia) TUN	Moez Abboud	8	0	8	0	0	0	0	0	0	0
26	MF	(Ghana) GHA	Harrison Afful	23	2	23	2	0	0	0	0	0	0
23	MF	(Tunisia) TUN	Chamseddine Samti	3	0	3	0	0	0	0	0	0	0
	MF	(Tunisia) TUN	Wassim Naghmouchi	0	0	0	0	0	0	0	0	0	0
27	MF	(Tunisia) TUN	Safouane Ben Salem	0	0	0	0	0	0	0	0	0	0
	MF	(Ivory Coast) CIV	Fousseny Coulibaly	10	1	10	1	0	0	0	0	0	0
	MF	(Tunisia) TUN	Mohamed Ali Ben Hamouda	6	0	6	0	0	0	0	0	0	0
	MF	(Tunisia) TUN	Seifeddine Akremi	3	0	3	0	0	0	0	0	0	0
Forwards
8	FW	(Tunisia) TUN	Idriss Mhirsi	25	2	25	2	0	0	0	0	0	0
9	FW	(Tunisia) TUN	Ahmed Akaichi	25	10	25	10	0	0	0	0	0	0
14	FW	(Tunisia) TUN	Haythem Jouini	20	4	20	4	0	0	0	0	0	0
15	FW	(Cameroon) CMR	Yannick N'Djeng	22	6	22	6	0	0	0	0	0	0
25	FW	(Guinea) GUI	Daouda Camara	1	0	1	0	0	0	0	0	0	0
	FW	(Nigeria) NGR	Emem Eduok	13	7	13	7	0	0	0	0	0	0
	FW	(Tunisia) TUN	Ghailene Chaalali	20	2	20	2	0	0	0	0	0	0
	FW	(Brazil) BRA	Magno Cruz	10	1	10	1	0	0	0	0	0	0
	FW	(Tunisia) TUN	Hassen Harbaoui	12	2	12	2	0	0	0	0	0	0
	FW	(Tunisia) TUN	Jemaïl Khemir	1	1	1	1	0	0	0	0	0	0
Players transferred out during the season

Last updated: 8 June 2019
Source: fr.soccerway.com

=== Goalscorers ===
Includes all competitive matches. The list is sorted alphabetically by surname when total goals are equal.

No.	Nat.	Player	Pos.	L 1	TC	CL 1	CC 3	TOTAL
9	(Tunisia)	Ahmed Akaichi	FW	10	2	2	0	14
	(Nigeria)	Emem Eduok	FW	7	0	0	2	9
15	(Cameroon)	Yannick N'Djeng	FW	6	0	3	0	9
10	(Tunisia)	Oussama Darragi	MF	6	0	0	0	6
14	(Tunisia)	Haythem Jouini	FW	4	0	0	0	4
26	(Ghana)	Harrison Afful	MF	2	0	1	1	4
	(Tunisia)	Ghailene Chaalali	FW	2	0	1	1	4
3	(Tunisia)	Larbi Jabeur	DF	2	0	1	0	3
5	(Tunisia)	Chamseddine Dhaouadi	DF	2	0	0	0	2
21	(Tunisia)	Mohamed Ali Yacoubi	DF	2	0	0	0	2
	(Tunisia)	Hassen Harbaoui	FW	2	0	0	0	2
8	(Tunisia)	Idriss Mhirsi	FW	2	0	0	0	2
24	(Tunisia)	Iheb Mbarki	DF	1	0	0	0	1
	(Ivory Coast)	Fousseny Coulibaly	MF	1	0	0	0	1
	(Brazil)	Magno Cruz	FW	1	0	0	0	1
4	(Tunisia)	Hocine Ragued	MF	1	0	0	0	1
	(Tunisia)	Youssef Khemiri		1	0	0	0	1
	(Tunisia)	Moez Aboud	MF	0	1	0	0	1
	(Tunisia)	Wassim Naghmouchi	MF	0	0	0	1	1
	(Tunisia)	Seif Jerbi		0	0	1	0	1
Own Goals				0	0	0	0	0
Totals				52	3	9	5	69

== Transfers ==
=== In ===
Date	Pos	Player	From club	Transfer fee	Source
1 July 2014	FW	(Mali) Moussa Marega	(France) Amiens SC	Free transfer	
11 July 2014	DF	(Tunisia) Mohamed Ali Yacoubi	Club Africain	Free transfer	
16 July 2014	MF	(Ivory Coast) Fousseny Coulibaly	US Monastir	Free transfer	
12 September 2014	FW	(Tunisia) Hassen Harbaoui	CA Bizertin	Free transfer	
15 December 2014	AM	(Brazil) Magno Cruz	(Brazil) Red Bull Bragantino	Free transfer	
22 December 2014	MF	(Tunisia) Chedly Ghrab	Stade Gabèsien	Free transfer	
22 December 2014	LB	(Tunisia) Hatem Bejaoui	Stade Tunisien	Free transfer	
22 December 2014	FW	(Nigeria) Emem Eduok	(Nigeria) Dolphins	Free transfer	

=== Out ===
Date	Pos	Player	To club	Transfer fee	Source
12 June 2014	LW	(Algeria) Youcef Belaïli	(Algeria) USM Alger	Free transfer	
5 July 2014	GK	(Tunisia) Wassim Naouara	CA Bizertin	Free transfer	
20 August 2014	LB	(Tunisia) Khalil Chemmam	(Portugal) Vitória de Guimarães	Free transfer	
20 September 2014	AM	(Tunisia) Iheb Msakni	(Lebanon) Al Ahed	Free transfer	
22 December 2014	MF	(Tunisia) Seifeddine Jerbi	Stade Tunisien	Free transfer	
13 January 2015	FW	(Tunisia) Mohamed Ali Ben Hammouda	AS Marsa	Free transfer	
15 January 2015	LB	(Tunisia) Seifeddine Akremi	Stade Tunisien	Free transfer	
31 January 2015	FW	(Mali) Moussa Marega	(Portugal) Marítimo	Free transfer	
