= 2013 African U-17 Championship =

بطولة أفريقيا تحت 17 سنة 2013

Tournament details
- Host country: Morocco
- Dates: 13–27 April
- Teams: 8 (from 1 confederation)
- Venue: 2 (in 2 host cities)

Final positions
- Champions: Ivory Coast (1st title)
- Runners-up: Nigeria
- Third place: Tunisia
- Fourth place: Morocco

Tournament statistics
- Matches played: 16
- Goals scored: 56 (3.5 per match)
- Top scorer(s): (Nigeria) Success Isaac (7 goals) (Nigeria) Kelechi Iheanacho (5 goals)

The 2013 African U-17 Championship was a football competition organized by the Confederation of African Football (CAF). The tournament took place in Morocco from 13 to 27 April. The top four teams qualified for the 2013 FIFA U-17 World Cup.

== Qualification ==
The qualifiers began on 7 September 2012 with the preliminary matches taking place, while the final round matches were played on 2 December 2012. At the end of the qualification, seven teams joined the hosts, Morocco.

=== Qualified teams ===
- Botswana
- Congo
- Ivory Coast
- Gabon
- Ghana
- Morocco (Hosts)
- Nigeria
- Tunisia

== Venues ==
Casablanca	2013 African U-17 Championship is located in Morocco
Stade Mohamed V	2013 African U-17 Championship is located in Morocco
Capacity: 67,000	2013 African U-17 Championship is located in Morocco
Marrakesh	2013 African U-17 Championship is located in Morocco
Stade de Marrakech	2013 African U-17 Championship is located in Morocco
Capacity: 45,240	2013 African U-17 Championship is located in Morocco

== Draw ==
The draw for the tournament was held on 9 December 2012 in Cairo, Egypt.

== Match officials ==
Referees

- (Morocco) Redouane Jiyed
- (Tunisia) Med Said Kordi
- (Kenya) Davies Ogenche Omweno
- (Somalia) Wiish Hagi Yabarow
- (Mozambique) Samuel Chirindza
- (Mali) Mahamadou Keita
- (Comoros) Ali Mohamed Adelaid
- (Botswana) Joshua Bondo
- (Democratic Republic of the Congo) Achille Madila
- (Namibia) Rainhold Shikongo
- (Senegal) Maguette Ndiaye
- (Burkina Faso) Juste Ephrem Zio

Assistant referees

- (Morocco) Bouazza Rouani
- (Seychelles) Eldrick Adelaide
- (Guinea) Sidiki Sidibe
- (Uganda) Mark Ssonko
- (Angola) Jerson Emiliano Dos Santos
- (South Africa) Mothibidi Stevens Khumalo
- (Ivory Coast) Marius Donatien Tan
- (Mauritania) Abderahmane Warr
- (Benin) Babadjide Bienvenu Dina
- (Niger) Yahaya Mahamadou
- (Mozambique) Arsénio Chadreque Marengula
- (Ethiopia) Kindie Mussie
- (Cameroon) Elvis Guy Noupue Nguegoue
- (Burkina Faso) Seydou Tiama

== Squads ==
=== MRI controversy ===
All players in the competition went through a mandatory MRI test which investigates bony fusion of the left distal radius (wrist). Several players were considered to be over-age by CAF and they were not eligible for the competition. The tests took place on 12 April, one day before the competition began leaving no time for a replacement players to be found. Ivory Coast, Congo and Nigeria each had three players found to be ineligible.

CAF released the names of the players who were found to be over-age:

Côte d'Ivoire

- (Ivory Coast) Willy Britto Dagou (DF)
- (Ivory Coast) Abdoul Diarrassouba (DF)
- (Ivory Coast) Sidiki Dembele (MF)

Nigeria

- (Nigeria) Wilfred Onyinye Ndidi (DF)
- (Nigeria) Ibrahim Abdullahi (DF)
- (Nigeria) Emmanuel Asadu (FW)

Congo

- (Republic of the Congo) Charlevy Mabiala (MF)
- (Republic of the Congo) Hardy Binguila (MF)
- (Republic of the Congo) Bermagin Kangou (FW)

== Group stage ==
Each group winner and runner-up advanced to the semi-finals.

Tiebreakers

1. Greater number of points obtained in the matches between the concerned teams
2. Best goal difference resulting from the matches between the concerned teams
3. Greatest number of goals scored in the matches between the concerned teams
4. Goal difference in all group matches
5. Greatest number of goals scored in all group matches
6. Fair Play point system in which the number of yellow and red cards are evaluated
7. Drawing of lots by CAF Organising Committee

All times are (UTC±0)

=== Group A ===
Pos	Team	Pld	W	D	L	GF	GA	GD	Pts	Qualification
1	Morocco (H)	3	2	1	0	8	2	+6	7	Knockout stage
2	Tunisia	3	2	1	0	8	4	+4	7	Knockout stage
3	Gabon	3	1	0	2	6	9	−3	3	
4	Botswana	3	0	0	3	2	9	−7	0	

Rules for classification: Group stage tiebreakers
(H) Hosts
13 April 2013
15:00

Morocco	4–1	Gabon
Sakhi 8', 10'; Bnou Marzouk 56'; Jaadi 90'		Eyamba 61' (pen.)

Stade Mohamed V, Casablanca
Referee: Reinhold Shikongo (Namibia)

13 April 2013
18:00

Tunisia	3–1	Botswana
Belarbi 2', 6' (pen.); Haj Hassen 50'		Tumisang 20'

Stade Mohamed V, Casablanca
Referee: Juste Zio (Burkina Faso)

16 April 2013
15:30

Gabon	2–4	Tunisia
Bouanga Owane 73'; Sellimi 79' (o.g.)		Belarbi 32'; Haj Hassen 39'; Abboud 45+2'; Allogho 88' (o.g.)

Stade Mohamed V, Casablanca
Referee: Maguette N'Diaye (Senegal)

16 April 2013
18:30

Botswana	0–3	Morocco
		Bnou Marzouk 17', 80'; Sakhi 49'

Stade Mohamed V, Casablanca
Referee: Davies Ogenche Omweno (Kenya)

19 April 2013
18:30

Morocco	1–1	Tunisia
El Bouazzati 47'		Haj Hassem 50'

Stade Mohamed V, Casablanca
Referee: Mahamadou Keita (Mali)

19 April 2013
18:30

Botswana	1–3	Gabon
Mooketsane 38'		Eyamba 2', 45+2'; Owane 78'

Stade de Marrakech, Marrakesh
Referee: Achille Madila (DR Congo)

=== Group B ===
Pos	Team	Pld	W	D	L	GF	GA	GD	Pts	Qualification
1	Nigeria	3	2	0	1	13	2	+11	6	Knockout stage
2	Ivory Coast	3	1	2	0	2	1	+1	5	Knockout stage
3	Ghana	3	0	2	1	2	7	−5	2	
4	Congo	3	0	2	1	2	9	−7	2	

Rules for classification: Group stage tiebreakers
14 April 2013
15:00

Congo	1–1	Ivory Coast
Ngatsongo Obassi 8'		Landry 27'

Stade de Marrakech, Marrakesh
Referee: Med Said Kordi (Tunisia)
14 April 2013
18:00

Nigeria	6–1	Ghana
Isaac 10', 40', 63' (pen.), 68'; Bulbwa 30'; Iheanacho 90+5'		Yeboah 66'

Stade de Marrakech, Marrakesh
Referee: Redouane Jiyed (Morocco)

17 April 2013
15:30

Ivory Coast	1–0	Nigeria
Niangbo 90'

Stade de Marrakech, Marrakesh
Referee: Samuel Chirindza (Mozambique)
17 April 2013
18:30

Ghana	1–1	Congo
Yeboah 38'		Bidimbou 3'

Stade de Marrakech, Marrakesh
Referee: Wiish Hagi Yabarow (Somalia)

20 April 2013
15:00

Congo	0–7	Nigeria
		Iheanacho 4', 44', 86'; Isaac 27', 33'; Yahaya 49'; Matthew 60'

Stade de Marrakech, Marrakesh
Referee: Joshua Bondo (Botswana)
20 April 2013
15:00

Ivory Coast	0–0	Ghana

Stade Mohamed V, Casablanca
Referee: Ali Mohamed Adelaid (Comoros)

== Knock-out stage ==
Semi-finals
23 April – Casablanca
Morocco	1
Ivory Coast	2
24 April – Marrakech
Nigeria	4
Tunisia	2

Final
27 April – Marrakech
Ivory Coast	1(5)
Nigeria	1(4)
Third place
26 April – Marrakech
Morocco	1(10)
Tunisia	1(11)

=== Semi-finals ===
23 April 2013
15:00

Morocco	1–2	Ivory Coast
Sabbar 67' (pen.)		Bedi 31'; Niangbo 39'

Stade Mohamed V, Casablanca
Referee: Reinhold Shikongo (Namibia)

24 April 2013
18:30

Nigeria	4–2	Tunisia
Iheanacho 2'; Yahaya 12', 58'; Isaac 21'		Belarbi 25'; Haj Hassen 30'

Stade de Marrakech, Marrakesh
Referee: Davies Ogenche Omweno (Kenya)

=== Third place match ===
27 April 2013
16:00

Morocco	1–1 (a.e.t.)	Tunisia
Bnou Marzouk 69'		Haj Hassan 44'
Penalties
Sabbar (penalty scored); Saoud (penalty scored); Jaadi (penalty scored); Jbira (penalty scored); Bnou Marzouk (penalty scored); El-Bouazzati (penalty scored); Jellal (penalty scored); Achaoui (penalty scored); El Azzouzi (penalty scored); Belkouch (penalty scored)	10–11	Samti (penalty scored); Sahraoui (penalty scored); Hnid (penalty scored); Jbeli (penalty scored); Slimi (penalty scored); Haj Hassan (penalty scored); Akrout (penalty scored); Abboud (penalty scored); Ayadi (penalty scored); Sahraoui (penalty scored); Samti (penalty scored)

Stade de Marrakech, Marrakesh
Referee: Joshua Bondo (Botswana)

=== Final ===
27 April 2013
18:00

Ivory Coast	1–1	Nigeria
Bile Bedia 26'	Report	Izu Omego 8'
Penalties
Coulibaly (penalty scored); Diallo (penalty scored); Angban (penalty scored); Ibrahima Keita (penalty scored); Niangbo (penalty scored)	5–4	(penalty scored) Issac; (penalty missed) Nwakali; (penalty scored) Ifeanyi; (penalty scored) Yahaya; (penalty scored) Mohammed

Stade de Marrakech, Marrakesh
Referee: Mahamadou Keita (Mali)

== Winners ==
2013 CAF Under-17 Championship
(Ivory Coast)
Ivory Coast
First title

== Goalscorers ==
7 goals

- (Nigeria) Success Isaac

5 goals

- (Nigeria) Kelechi Iheanacho

4 goals

- (Tunisia) Firas Belarbi
- (Morocco) Younes Bnou Marzouk
- (Tunisia) Hazem Haj Hassen

3 goals

- (Nigeria) Yahaya Umar
- (Morocco) Hamza Sakhi
- (Gabon) Mac Leod Eyamba

2 goals

- (Gabon) Kevine Bouanga Owane
- (Ghana) Yaw Yeboah
- (Ivory Coast) Junior Landry

1 goal

- (Botswana) Orebonye Tumisang
- (Republic of the Congo) Bersyl Ngatsongo Obassi
- (Republic of the Congo) Kader Bidimbou
- (Ivory Coast) Guy Bedi
- (Nigeria) Prince Izu Omego
- (Morocco) Nabil Jaadi
- (Nigeria) Ifeanyi Matthew
- (Botswana) Kabelano Mooketsane
- (Morocco) Walid Sabar
- (Nigeria) Bernard Bulbwa
- (Tunisia) Moez Abboud
- (Morocco) Mohamed El Boauzzati
- (Ivory Coast) Chris Bile Bedia

Own goal

- (Gabon) Wilnod Allogho (against Tunisia)
- (Tunisia) Yasser Sellimi (against Gabon)
