= Flight Football Club =

Football club in Nigeria

Flight Football Club Gboko
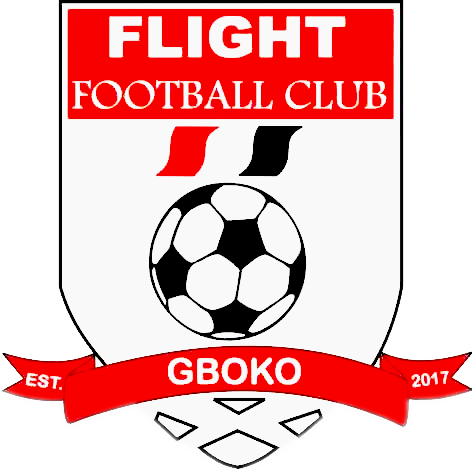
- Full name: Flight Football Club Gboko
- Nickname: The Transporters
- Founded: 2017
- Stadium: J.S Tarka Stadium Gboko
- Capacity: 15000
- Owner: Akor Andiir
- President: Solomon Atoo Andiir
- Chairman: Luter Iyorhe
- Coach: Donald Orhungul
- League: Nigeria Nationwide League

Flight Football Club is a Nigeria professional football club based in Gboko, Benue State, Nigeria. Founded in 2017, the club competes in the Nigeria Nationwide League, the third division of the Nigeria Football League system and The Nigeria President Federation Cup. They are nicknamed The Transporters. In 2023, Flight FC boasted of featuring two Ex-Super Eagles players Benard Bulbwa and Otekpa Eneji in their 2023 NLO squad.

== History ==
The club was founded in 2017 by Chief Dr. Akor Andiir as Flight FC and led by Dr. Solomon Atoo Andiir as President with the sole aim of youth empowerment. In 2018, continuous hard work of the club saw them promoted to the third tier of Nigerian Football, the Nigeria Nationwide League (NLO). Further development saw the club's management re-brand its organization. The rebranding included a change of structure, unveiling new leadership.

== Color ==
Flight FC are also known as The Transporters. The primary color for Flight FC is Red.

== Stadium ==
As a developing team, Flight FC Gboko played and trained at the school pitch of Akperan Orshi Polytechnic, in Gboko.

The club then relocated their training ground to Fidei Polytechnic Gboko, while their match venue is the J.S. Tarka Stadium Gboko.

== Rivalries ==
Lobi Stars F.C are considered to be Flight FC's main rivals, their meetings are always well-attended, with their 2023 FA cup finals recording an attendance record of 8,750 fans at the J.S Tarka stadium.

== Performance in NLO1 ==
- 2022-2023 Topped NLO Group – lost at playoffs

== Current squad ==
As of 1 March 2026

Note: Flags indicate national team as defined under FIFA eligibility rules; some limited exceptions apply. Players may hold more than one non-FIFA nationality.

No.	Pos.	Nation	Player
1	GK	NGA	Bemsen Melai
13	GK	NGA	Kpakor Philip
23	GK	NGA	Tarnande Bartholomew
33	GK	NGA	Msughter David
2	DF	NGA	Gwarche Moses.6
31	DF	NGA	Iwar Keghtor
30	DF	NGA	Oryiman Yaweh
22	DF	NGA	Nnamani Solomon
5	DF	NGA	Mark Tachia
27	DF	NGA	Ahua Aondoaseer
4	DF	NGA	Agwaza Aondoyima
14	DF	NGA	Ukpokpo Bemgba
12	DF	NGA	Atetan Desmond
21	DF	NGA	Luter Hernandez
32	DF	NGA	Msughve Thaddeus
24	MF	NGA	Deluke Lubem

== Honours ==
=== League ===
- Benue State League Champions:
  - Winners (1): 2018-2019

== Leadership ==
Founder	Chief Dr. Akor Andiir
President	Solomon Atoo Andiir
Chairman	Luter Iyorhe
Technical Adviser	Donald Orhungul
Supporters Club Chairman	Aondona Alingo
