= Nafti =

Nafti may refer to:

== Given name ==
- Abdelkarim Nafti, Tunisian footballer
- Bassem Nafti, Tunisian footballer
- Mehdi Nafti, Tunisian footballer

== Surname ==
- Mohamed Ali Nafti (born 1959), Tunisian diplomat and politician

== See also ==
- National Film and Television Institute
