= Harbaoui =

Surname list

Harbaoui is a surname. Notable people with the surname include:

- Hamdi Harbaoui (born 1985), Tunisian footballer
- Hassen Harbaoui (born 1987), Tunisian footballer
