= Ali Abdi (footballer) =

Tunisian footballer (born 1993)

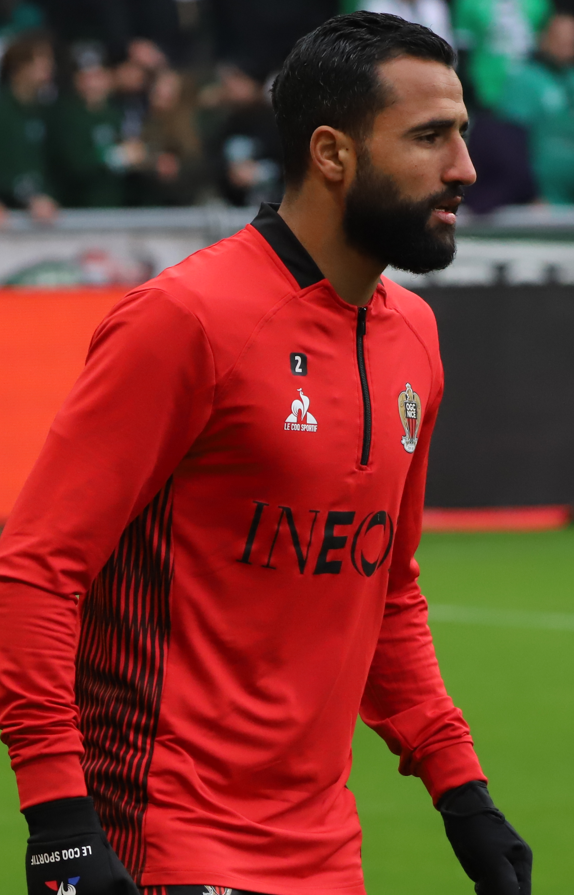
- Abdi with Nice in 2025

Personal information
- Full name: Ali El Abdi
- Date of birth: 20 December 1993 (age 32)
- Place of birth: Sfax, Tunisia
- Height: 1.77 m (5 ft 10 in)
- Position: Left-back

Team information
- Current team: Nice
- Number: 2

Youth career
- Sfax RS

Senior career*
Years	Team	Apps	(Gls)
2011–2012	JS Kairouan	15	(2)
2012–2016	Espérance de Tunis	12	(0)
2014	→ Stade Tunisien (loan)	17	(4)
2016–2019	Club Africain	56	(7)
2019–2021	Paris	47	(9)
2020	Paris B	1	(0)
2021–2024	Caen	98	(14)
2021	Caen B	1	(0)
2024–	Nice	50	(8)

International career^{‡}
2015	Tunisia U23	4	(0)
2021–	Tunisia	49	(7)
- * Club domestic league appearances and goals as of 20 September 2026 ‡ National team caps and goals as of 26 June 2026

Ali El Abdi (Arabic: عَلِيّ الْعَابِدِيّ; born 20 December 1993), known as Ali Abdi, is a Tunisian professional footballer who plays as a left-back for Ligue 1 club Nice and the Tunisia national team.

== Club career ==
Abdi made his professional debut with JS Kairouan in a 0–0 Tunisian Ligue Professionnelle 1 tie with EGS Gafsa on 25 December 2011. On 24 June 2019, Abdi moved to Paris FC in the French Ligue 2.

On 21 July 2021, he signed a two-year contract with Caen.

On 2 September 2024, Abdi signed for Ligue 1 club Nice for a fee of €500,000. This transfer was completed outside the regular transfer window dates thanks to a "joker" transfer exemption granted by the Ligue de Football Professionnel.

== International career ==
Abdi made his debut for the Tunisia national team on 25 March 2021 in an AFCON 2021 qualifier against Libya.

On 15 May 2026, Abdi was named in the Tunisia squad for the 2026 FIFA World Cup.

== Career statistics ==
=== Club ===
As of match played 20 September 2026

Appearances and goals by club, season and competition
Club	Season	League			National cup (Note: Includes Tunisian Cup, Coupe de France)		League cup (Note: Includes Coupe de la Ligue)		Continental		Other		Total	
Club	Season	Division	Apps	Goals	Apps	Goals	Apps	Goals	Apps	Goals	Apps	Goals	Apps	Goals
JS Kairouan	2011–12	Tunisian Ligue Professionnelle 1	15	2	0	0	—		—		—		15	2
Espérance de Tunis	2012–13	Tunisian Ligue Professionnelle 1	1	0	—		—		0	0	—		1	0
Espérance de Tunis	2013–14	Tunisian Ligue Professionnelle 1	0	0	0	0	—		2 (Note: Appearances in CAF Champions League)	0	—		2	0
Espérance de Tunis	2014–15	Tunisian Ligue Professionnelle 1	11	0	0	0	—		0	0	—		11	0
Espérance de Tunis	2015–16	Tunisian Ligue Professionnelle 1	0	0	0	0	—		0	0	—		0	0
Espérance de Tunis	Total		12	0	0	0	—		2	0	—		14	0
Stade Tunisien (loan)	2013–14	Tunisian Ligue Professionnelle 1	17	4	2	0	—		—		—		19	4
Club Africain	2016–17	Tunisian Ligue Professionnelle 1	12	2	2	0	—		11 (Note: Appearances in CAF Confederation Cup)	2	—		25	4
Club Africain	2017–18	Tunisian Ligue Professionnelle 1	22	2	5	1	—		2	0	—		29	3
Club Africain	2018–19	Tunisian Ligue Professionnelle 1	22	3	2	0	—		7	0	—		31	3
Club Africain	Total		56	7	9	1	—		20	2	—		85	10
Paris FC	2019–20	Ligue 2	14	0	1	0	2	0	—		—		17	0
Paris FC	2020–21	Ligue 2	33	9	1	0	—		—		—		34	9
Paris FC	Total		47	9	2	0	2	0	—		—		51	9
Paris FC B	2019–20	Championnat National 3	1	0	—		—		—		—		1	0
Caen	2021–22	Ligue 2	31	2	0	0	—		—		—		31	2
Caen	2022–23	Ligue 2	32	3	1	0	—		—		—		33	3
Caen	2023–24	Ligue 2	33	9	0	0	—		—		—		33	9
Caen	2024–25	Ligue 2	2	0	—		—		—		—		2	0
Caen	Total		98	14	1	0	—		—		—		99	14
Caen B	2021–22	Championnat National 2	1	0	—		—		—		—		1	0
Nice	2024–25	Ligue 1	25	5	2	0	—		4 (Note: Appearances in UEFA Europa League)	0	—		31	5
Nice	2025–26	Ligue 1	22	3	2	0	—		7	0	1 (Note: Appearance in Ligue 1 relegation/promotion play-offs)	0	32	3
Nice	2026–27	Ligue 1	3	0	0	0	—		—|colspan=2|—		3	0		
Nice	Total		50	8	4	0	—		11	0	1	0	66	8
Career total			297	43	18	1	2	0	33	2	1	0	351	47

=== International ===
As of match played 25 June 2026

Appearances and goals by national team and year
National team	Year	Apps	Goals
Tunisia	2021	4	0
Tunisia	2022	9	2
Tunisia	2023	8	0
Tunisia	2024	11	2
Tunisia	2025	11	3
Tunisia	2026	6	0
Total		49	7

Scores and results list Tunisia's goal tally first, score column indicates score after each Abdi goal.

List of international goals scored by Ali Abdi
No.	Date	Venue	Opponent	Score	Result	Competition
1	10 June 2022	Noevir Stadium Kobe, Kobe, Japan	Chile	1–0	2–0	2022 Kirin Cup
2	16 November 2022	Ahmad bin Ali Stadium, Al Rayyan, Qatar	Iran	2–0	2–0	Friendly
3	7 September 2024	Ben M'Hamed El Abdi Stadium, El Jadida, Morocco	Gambia	1–0	2–1	2025 Africa Cup of Nations qualification
4	14 November 2024	Loftus Versfeld Stadium, Pretoria, South Africa	Madagascar	3–2	3–2	2025 Africa Cup of Nations qualification
5	13 October 2025	Hammadi Agrebi Stadium, Radès, Tunisia	Namibia	1–0	3–0	2026 FIFA World Cup qualification
6	14 November 2025	Hammadi Agrebi Stadium, Radès, Tunisia	Jordan	1–1	3–2	Friendly
7	27 December 2025	Fez Stadium, Fez, Morocco	Nigeria	2–3	2–3	2025 Africa Cup of Nations

== Honours ==
Club Africain

- Tunisian Cup: 2016–17, 2017–18

Nice

- Coupe de France runner-up: 2025–26

Tunisia

- Kirin Cup: 2022

Individual

- UNFP Ligue 2 Team of the Year: 2021–22, 2023–24
- Tunisian Footballer of the Year: 2024, 2025
