= Otekpa Eneji =

Nigerian footballer

Personal information
- Date of birth: 5 February 1989 (age 37)
- Place of birth: Gboko, Nigeria
- Position: Midfielder

Team information
- Current team: Kano Pillars

Youth career
- Mighty Juniors F.C.

Senior career*
Years	Team	Apps	(Gls)
2007	BCC Lions		
2007–2008	Ranchers Bees		
2008–2009	Lobi		
2009–2013	Enyimba		
2014–	Kano Pillars		

International career^{‡}
2010–	Nigeria	2	(0)
- * Club domestic league appearances and goals as of 31 August 2010 ‡ National team caps and goals as of 6 Sept 2010

Otekpa Eneji (born 5 February 1989) is a Nigerian football player currently playing for Kano Pillars F.C. in the Nigeria Premier League.

== Career ==
He was one of five Pillars players injured during an armed robbery as the club was headings south for their 2015 Nigeria Professional Football League opener against Heartland FC.

== International career ==
He was selected for the Nigerian national team for the first time in a friendly match against South Korea in August 2010, starting and playing 81 minutes.
