= Younes Bnou Marzouk =

Footballer (born 1996)

Younes Marzouk
Personal information
- Full name: Younes Bnou Marzouk
- Date of birth: 2 March 1996 (age 30)
- Place of birth: Freyming-Merlebach, France
- Height: 1.80 m (5 ft 11 in)
- Position: Forward

Team information
- Current team: Erzeni
- Number: 23

Youth career
- 2006: USF Farebersviller
- 2006–2010: SG Marienau
- 2011–2013: Metz
- 2013–2015: Juventus

Senior career*
Years	Team	Apps	(Gls)
2015–2017	Juventus	0	(0)
2015–2016	→ KVC Westerlo (loan)	0	(0)
2016–2017	→ Angers B (loan)	17	(2)
2017	→ Chiasso (loan)	18	(12)
2017–2019	Lugano	11	(1)
2018	→ Dalkurd (loan)	10	(1)
2018–2019	→ Sliema Wanderers (loan)	21	(8)
2019–2021	Chiasso	34	(11)
2021–2023	Rapid București	30	(5)
2024–	Erzeni	9	(1)

International career
2013	Morocco U17	7	(3)
2014	France U18	2	(0)
- * Club domestic league appearances and goals as of 1 June 2024

Younes Bnou Marzouk (Arabic: يونس بن مرزوق; born 2 March 1996) is a professional footballer who plays as a forward for Albanian club Erzeni. Born in France with Moroccan origins, he represented both nations at youth international levels.

== Club career ==
=== Juventus and loans ===
Having been raised in the youth sector of Metz, Bnou Marzouk joined Juventus' youth team in 2013 for €500,000. Following two seasons with the Primavera (under-19) team, in August 2015 he was loaned to Westerlo in Belgium. In January 2016, Bnou Marzouk was again loaned out, joining Angers II, before moving to Swiss club FC Chiasso in January 2017 on loan, with whom he scored 12 goals in 18 appearances.

=== Lugano and loans ===
In June 2017, Bnou Marzouk was bought outright by FC Lugano. He was loaned to Dalkurd FF, a newly promoted team in the Swedish Allsvenskan, in January 2018.

== Style of play ==
Bnou Marzouk is a fast centre-forward, although he sometimes plays as second striker or left-winger. He is known as a player with good individual technique and an at-times imposing physical presence.
