= Hazem Haj Hassen =

Tunisian footballer (born 1996)

Personal information
- Full name: Hazem Haj Hassen
- Date of birth: 15 February 1996 (age 30)
- Place of birth: Sousse, Tunisia
- Height: 1.82 m (5 ft 11 1/2 in)
- Position: Forward

Team information
- Current team: Al-Yarmouk SC (Amman)

Youth career
- Étoile du Sahel

Senior career*
Years	Team	Apps	(Gls)
2014–2016	Bordeaux II	0	(0)
2016	Bordeaux	23	(1)
2017–2020	Étoile du Sahel	38	(8)
2021–2025	CS Sfaxien	55	(8)
2025–	Al-Yarmouk SC (Amman)		

International career
2013	Tunisia U17	6	(3)
2019–	Tunisia	1	(0)
- * Club domestic league appearances and goals

Hazem Haj Hassen (born 15 February 1996) is a Tunisian professional footballer who plays as a forward for Al-Yarmouk SC (Amman).

== Career ==
=== Club ===
Haj Hassen's career started in the youth of Étoile du Sahel, before he made the move to French football to join Ligue 1 club Bordeaux. He originally featured for the club's reserves in Championnat de France Amateur (twenty-three appearances, one goal during 2014–15 & 2015–16) before making his first-team debut on 10 February 2016 in a Coupe de France defeat to Nantes. He left Bordeaux in July 2016. In January 2017, Hassen joined Tunisian Ligue Professionnelle 1 side Étoile du Sahel. He made his debut for the club on 15 February in a match defeat against EO Sidi Bouzid.

=== International ===
Haj Hassen represented Tunisia at U17 level, he scored one goal (vs. Argentina) in four appearances at the 2013 FIFA U-17 World Cup in the United Arab Emirates.

== Career statistics ==
As of 9 November 2018.

Club statistics
Club	Season	League			Cup (Note: Includes the Coupe de France and Tunisian Cup)		League Cup (Note: Includes the Coupe de la Ligue)		Continental (Note: Includes the UEFA Europa League and CAF Champions League)		Other		Total	
Club	Season	Division	Apps	Goals	Apps	Goals	Apps	Goals	Apps	Goals	Apps	Goals	Apps	Goals
Bordeaux	2014–15	French Ligue 1	0	0	0	0	0	0	—		0	0	0	0
Bordeaux	2015–16	French Ligue 1	0	0	1	0	0	0	0	0	0	0	1	0
Bordeaux	Total		0	0	1	0	0	0	0	0	0	0	1	0
Bordeaux II	2014–15	CFA	9	0	—		—		—		0	0	9	0
Bordeaux II	2015–16	CFA	14	1	—		—		—		0	0	14	1
Bordeaux II	Total		23	1	—		—		—		0	0	23	1
Étoile du Sahel	2016–17	Tunisian Ligue 1	1	0	0	0	—		0	0	0	0	1	0
Étoile du Sahel	2017–18	Tunisian Ligue 1	0	0	0	0	—		0	0	0	0	0	0
Étoile du Sahel	2018–19	Tunisian Ligue 1	1	1	0	0	—		0	0	0	0	1	1
Étoile du Sahel	Total		2	1	0	0	—		0	0	0	0	2	1
Career total			25	2	1	0	0	0	0	0	0	0	26	2
