= Achraf Achaoui =

Association footballer (born 1996)

Personal information
- Date of birth: 10 December 1996 (age 29)
- Place of birth: Anderlecht, Belgium
- Position: Left-back

Youth career
- 2012–2013: La Gantoise B
- 2013–2017: Standard Liège

Senior career*
Years	Team	Apps	(Gls)
2016–2017	Standard Liège	1	(0)
2017–2018	Roda JC	0	(0)
2019–2020	Olympic Charleroi	2	(0)
2020–2021	Rebecq	0	(0)
2021–2022	Solières	5	(0)

International career
2013	Morocco U17	4	(0)
2016	Morocco U23	1	(0)
- * Club domestic league appearances and goals as of 18:11, 7 January 2024 (UTC)

Achraf Achaoui (born 10 December 1996) is a professional footballer who plays as a left-back. Born in Belgium, he has represented Morocco internationally.

== Club career ==
Achaoui made his senior debut in a 4–1 win over Royal Excel Mouscron.

On 7 May 2019, Achaoui joined Belgian club Olympic Charleroi. The following year, in August 2020, he signed with Rebecq. In 2021, he started playing for Solières.

== International career ==
Achaoui was born in Belgium to parents of Moroccan descent. Achaoui made 4 appearances for the Morocco U17s in the 2013 FIFA U-17 World Cup. Achaoui was called up and capped for the Morocco U23s in a friendly 1–0 win against the Cameroon U23s.
