= Khaled Gharsellaoui =

Tunisian footballer

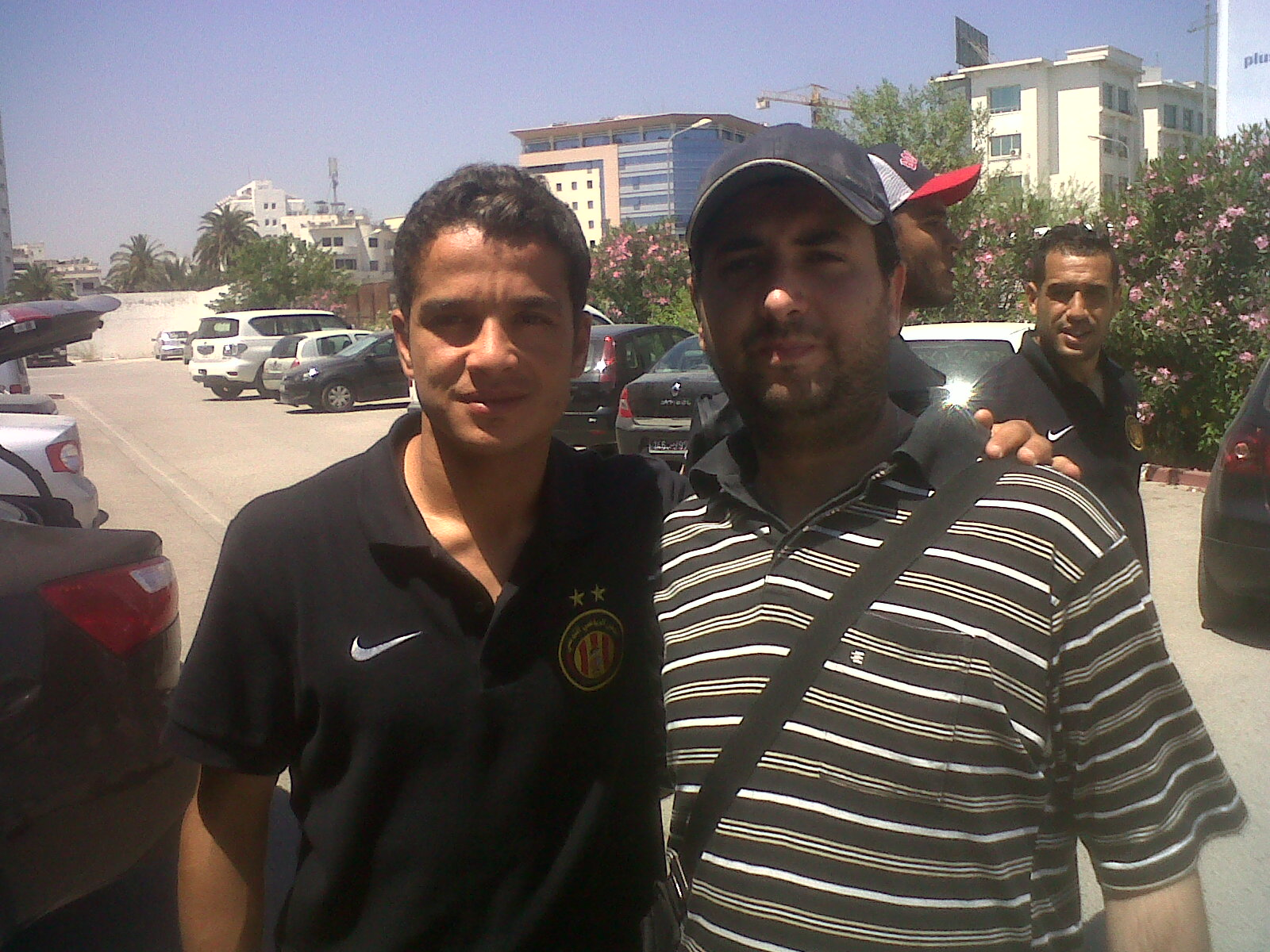

Personal information
- Full name: Khaled Gharsellaoui
- Date of birth: 29 July 1990 (age 36)
- Place of birth: Tunisia
- Height: 1.79 m (5 ft 10 in)
- Position: Midfielder

Youth career
- CS Hzeg

Senior career*
| Years | Team | Apps | (Gls) |
| 2011–2012 | EGS Gafsa | 13 | (1) |
| 2012–2017 | Espérance | 28 | (1) |
| 2015–2016 | → Dhofar (loan) | 7 | (2) |
| 2016–2017 | → ES Métlaoui (loan) | 26 | (2) |
| 2017–2019 | Stade Gabèsien | 45 | (4) |
| 2019–2020 | Al-Shoalah | 15 | (2) |
| 2020 | ES Métlaoui | | |
| 2020–2021 | Ben Guerdane | 13 | (0) |
| 2021–2022 | Wej | | |
| 2022–2023 | Olympique Béja | | |
| 2023 | Arar | | |
- * Club domestic league appearances and goals

Khaled Gharsellaoui (born 29 July 1990) is a Tunisian footballer who as a midfielder.
