= Bassem Nafti =

Tunisian footballer

Personal information
- Date of birth: 21 August 1985 (age 41)
- Position: Midfielder

Senior career*
| Years | Team | Apps | (Gls) |
| 2007–2009 | EGS Gafsa | | |
| 2009–2011 | US Monastir | | |
| 2011–2015 | EGS Gafsa | | |
| 2015–2019 | AS Gabès | | |
- * Club domestic league appearances and goals

Bassem Nafti (born 21 August 1985) is a Tunisian football midfielder.
