= Chaker Rguiî =

Tunisian footballer

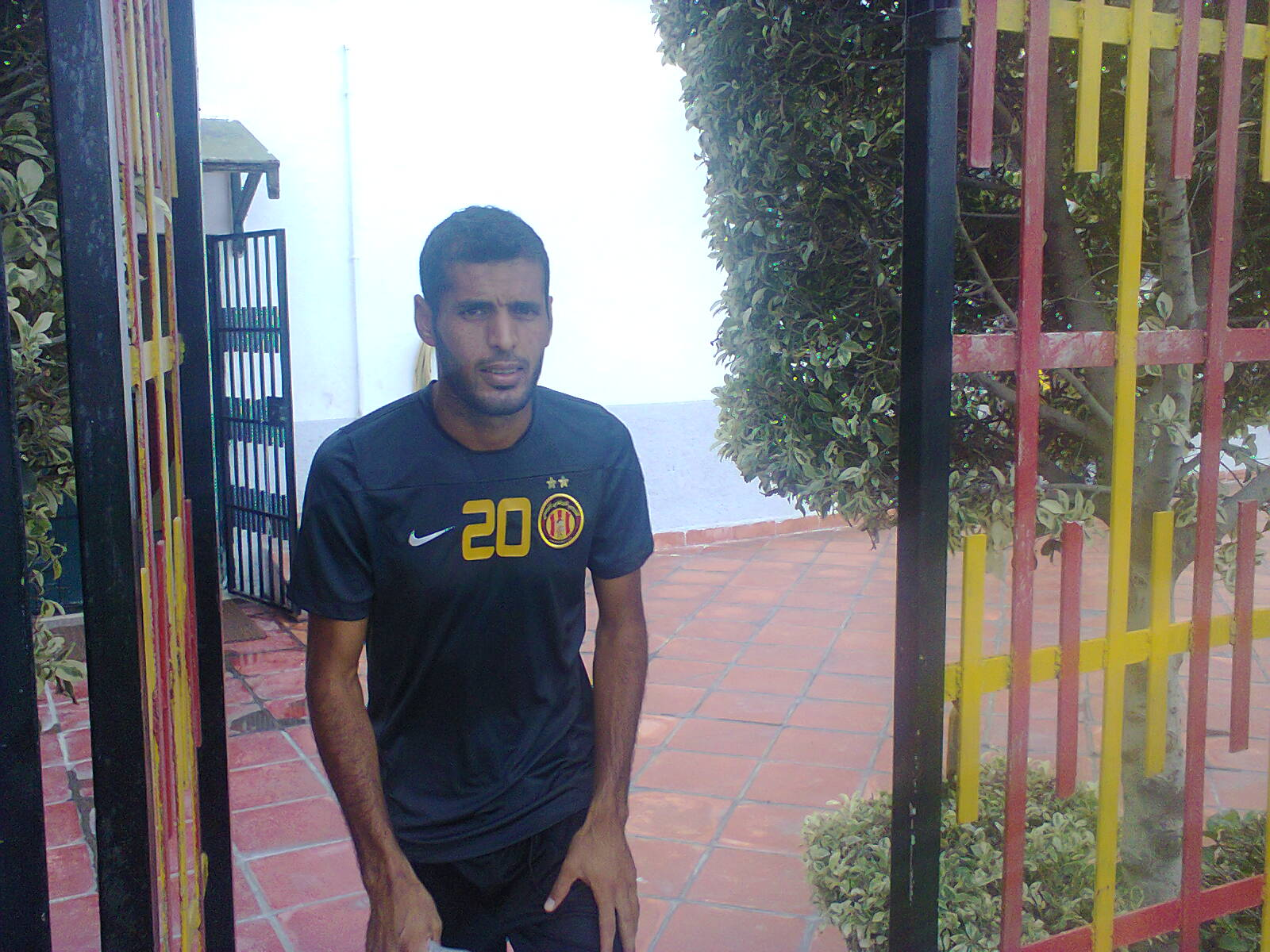
- Rguiî in 2015

Personal information
- Full name: Chaker Rguiî
- Date of birth: 25 May 1987 (age 39)
- Place of birth: Ben Gardane, Tunisia
- Height: 1.84 m (6 ft 0 in)
- Position: Midfielder

Senior career*
Years	Team	Apps	(Gls)
2009–2011	ES Zarzis	23	(6)
2011–2014	Club Africain	16	(0)
2012–2013	→ Hammam-Lif (loan)	14	(1)
2013–2014	US Ben Guerdane	22	(3)
2014–2015	ES Zarzis	29	(9)
2015–2018	ES Tunis	12	(0)
2016–2017	→ Kazma (loan)	?	(?)
2017–2018	→ ES Zarzis (loan)	14	(1)
2018–2021	Al-Kawkab	94	(26)
2021–2022	Al-Bukiryah		
2022–2023	Al-Ansar		

International career
2015	Tunisia	3	(0)
- * Club domestic league appearances and goals

Chaker Rguiî (Arabic: شاكر الرقيعي; born 25 May 1987) is a Tunisian professional footballer who currently plays as a midfielder.

On 26 July 2021, Rguiî joined Saudi club Al-Bukiryah. On 14 July 2022, Rguiî joined Al-Ansar.
