= Arbi Jabeur =

Tunisian footballer

Larbi Jabeur
Personal information
- Full name: Larbi Jabeur
- Date of birth: May 25, 1985 (age 41)
- Place of birth: Tunis, Tunisia
- Height: 1.87 m (6 ft 2 in)
- Position: Center back

Youth career
- 1996–2004: Espérance Sportive de Tunis

Senior career*
Years	Team	Apps	(Gls)
2004–2009	Espérance Sportive de Tunis	140	(10)
2009–2011	Ittihad Tripoli	32	
2011–2013	CA Bizertin	8	(0)

International career^{‡}
2006	Tunisia	0	(0)
- * Club domestic league appearances and goals as of August 31, 2007 ‡ National team caps and goals as of October 15, 2008

Larbi Jabeur (born May 25, 1985 in Tunis) is a Tunisian football player.
