= Hocine Ragued =

Footballer (born 1983)

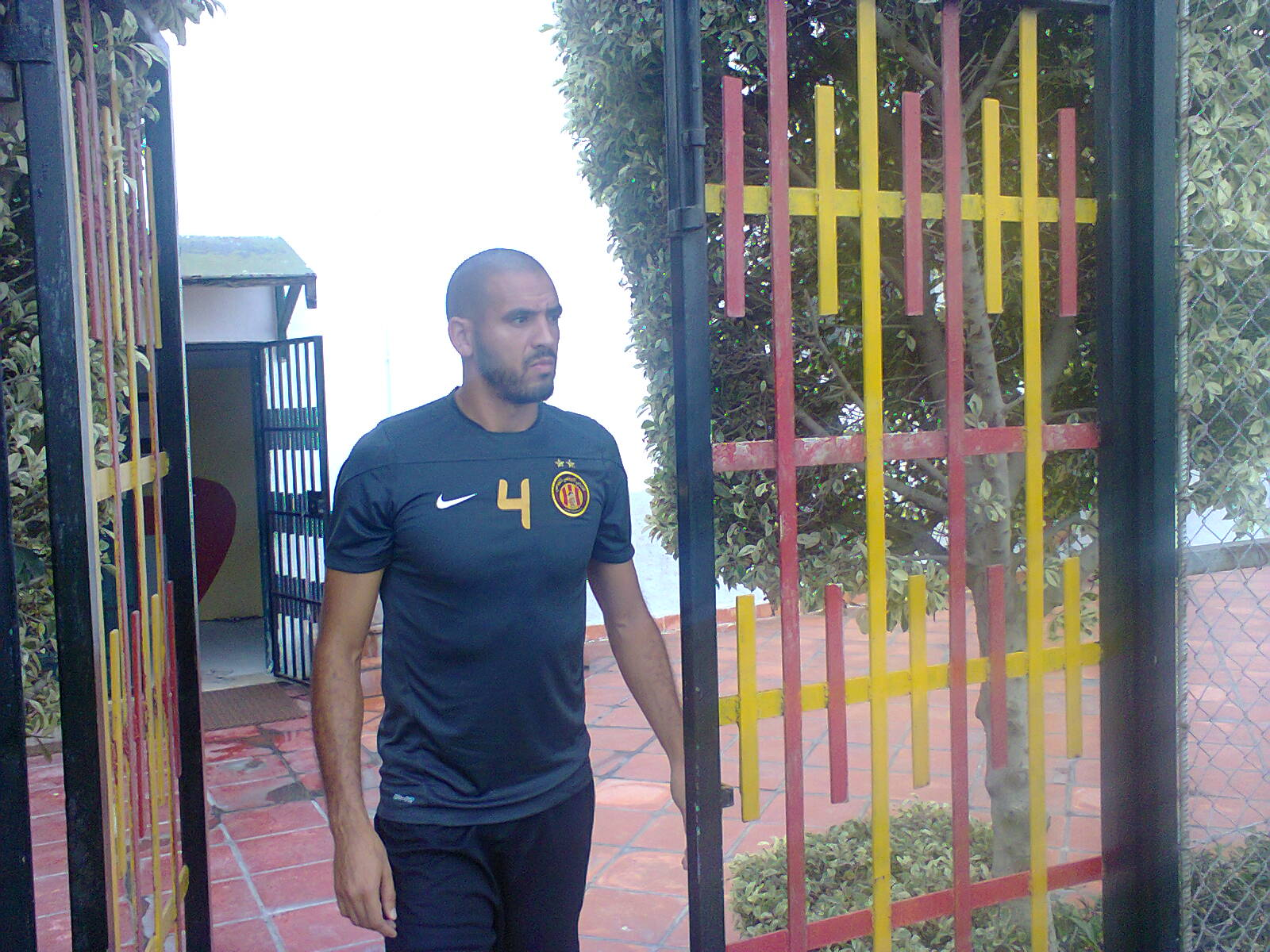

Personal information
- Date of birth: 11 February 1983 (age 43)
- Place of birth: Paris, France
- Height: 1.77 m (5 ft 9 1/2 in)
- Position: Defensive midfielder

Youth career
- 2001–2002: Paris Saint-Germain

Senior career*
Years	Team	Apps	(Gls)
2002–2006	Paris Saint-Germain	1	(0)
2002–2003	→ Istres (loan)	21	(2)
2004	→ Gueugnon (loan)	3	(0)
2006–2009	Mons	93	(1)
2009–2011	Slavia Prague	51	(0)
2011–2012	Karabükspor	42	(1)
2012–2016	Espérance Tunis	136	(3)
2016–2018	Emirates Club	20	(1)

International career^{‡}
2004	Tunisia U23		
2006–2015	Tunisia	54	(0)
- * Club domestic league appearances and goals as of 00:00, July 25, 2012 (UTC) ‡ National team caps and goals as of 18:49, 13 January 2013 (UTC)

Hocine Ragued (Arabic: حسين الراقد; born 11 February 1983) is a French-born former professional footballer who played as a defensive midfielder for the Tunisia national team.

== Club career ==
=== Paris Saint-Germain ===
Ragued grew up in the 20th arrondissement of Paris. He started with the youth of Paris FC before joining the PSG academy. After turning pro with the PSG, he was loaned to FC Istres then to FC Gueugnon in Ligue 2 for 6 months, from January 2004 to June 2004. He joined the PSG squad for the 2005/2006 season and got his start on 13 May 2006 against FC Metz.

=== RAEC Mons ===
In order to gain play time, Ragued decided to join RAEC Mons in Belgium for a 2-year contract to play in the Belgacom league. He signed an extension until 2011 but decided to resign at the end of the 2008/2009 season.

=== Slavia Prague ===
In July 2009, Ragued signed a 4-year contract with SK Slavia Prague. In his first season, he played 23 games in the Czech 1st league and 5 Europa league games and 2 UEFA Champions league pre-round qualifier. SK Slavia Prague ended at the 7th place in the league.

For his second season, Ragued played 12 games and had his last game on 12 November 2010 against Baník Ostrava.

=== Karabükspor ===
On 31 January 2011 Ragued signed a 1-year and a half contract with Karabükspor; he made his debut on 5 February 2011 against Beşiktaş JK. His scored his first goal with his new team during his 4th game against Torku Konyaspor on 27 February. He played a total of 9 games and his team earned the 9th spot of the Süper Lig.

During his second season, Ragued played 24 games.

=== Espérance de Tunis ===
Ragued joined the ES Tunis where he became the captain of the team, won 2 championships (2012 and 2014), made it to the finals of the African Champion leagues in 2012. Ragued was voted best player of the team by the ES Tunis fan in 2014 and 2015.

== International career ==
Ragued participated in the Olympics of Athens in 2004. Roger Lemerre gave him his first chance with the A team. Ragued rapidly became a pillar of the national team. He played 2 Africa Cup of Nations (CAN) in 2010 and 2012. He also played in the World Cup 2010 and 2014 qualifying games, in which Tunisia didn't qualify. Ragued has a total of 54 caps with the National team before officially retiring of the National Team on 1 October 2015.
