= Idriss Mhirsi =

Tunisian footballer

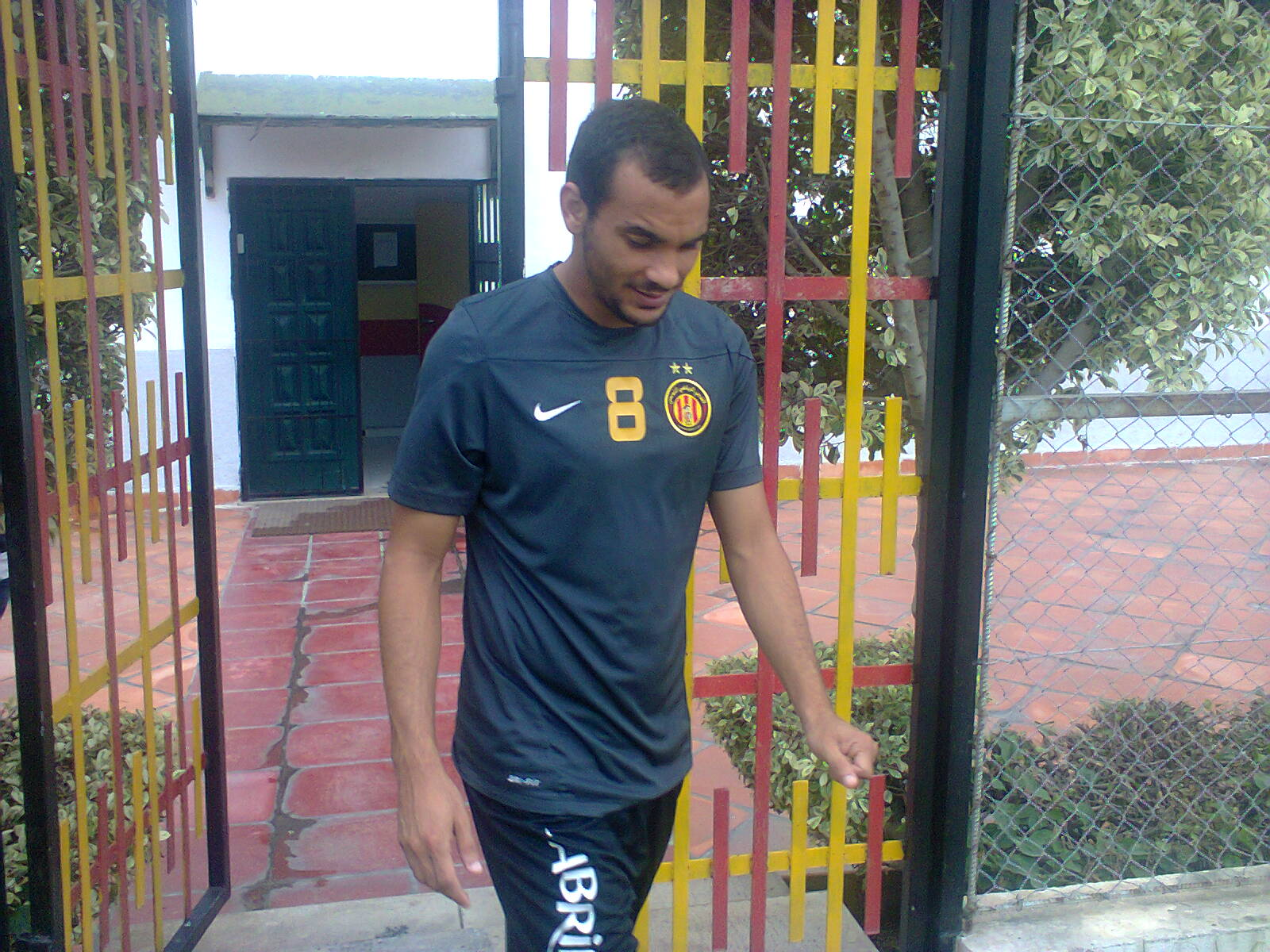
- Mhirsi training with ES Tunis in 2015

Personal information
- Full name: Idriss Mhirsi
- Date of birth: 21 February 1994 (age 32)
- Place of birth: Tunis, Tunisia
- Height: 1.77 m (5 ft 10 in)
- Position: Midfielder

Youth career
- 2004–2011: ES Tunis

Senior career*
Years	Team	Apps	(Gls)
2011–2016	ES Tunis	91	(11)
2016–2019	Red Star	59	(5)
2019–2024	Monastir	75	(14)

International career^{‡}
2010	Tunisia U17	5	(5)
2011–2013	Tunisia U20	17	(8)
2011	Tunisia U23	7	(1)
2013–2017	Tunisia	3	(0)
- * Club domestic league appearances and goals as of 18:05, 8 March 2025 (UTC) ‡ National team caps and goals as of 05:05, 11 July 2026 (UTC)

Idriss Mhirsi (born 21 February 1994) is a Tunisian professional footballer who most recently played as a midfielder for US Monastir. He is a youth product of ES Tunis.

== Club career ==
On 5 December 2019, Mhirsi returned to Tunisia and signed a deal until the summer 2021 with US Monastir.

== International career ==
Mhirsi debuted for Tunisia in 2013 against Morocco.
