= Haythem Jouini =

Tunisian footballer (born 1993)

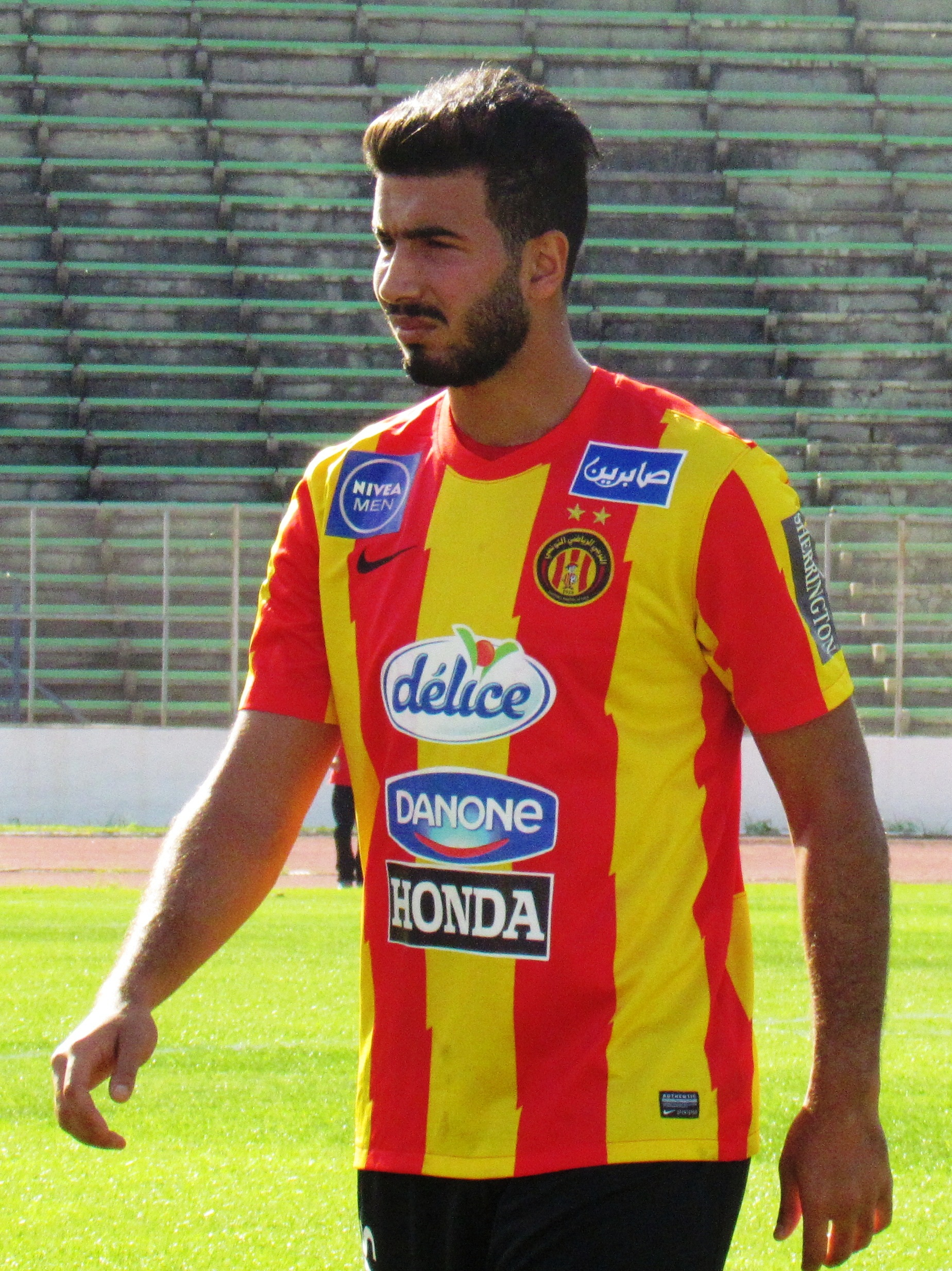
- Jouini with Espérance Tunis in 2017

Personal information
- Full name: Haythem Jouini
- Date of birth: 7 May 1993 (age 33)
- Place of birth: Tunis, Tunisia
- Height: 1.92 m (6 ft 4 in)
- Position: Forward

Team information
- Current team: Al-Quwa Al-Jawiya
- Number: 9

Youth career
- –2012: Espérance de Tunis

Senior career*
Years	Team	Apps	(Gls)
2012–2020	Espérance Tunis	146	(42)
2016–2017	→ Tenerife (loan)	21	(2)
2020	Al-Ain	10	(2)
2020–2021	Al Mokawloon Al Arab	12	(2)
2021-2022	Al Ahly Benghazi		
2022-2024	Stade Tunisien	38	(15)
2024-2025	Dibba Al-Hisn	23	(7)
2025-	Al-Quwa Al-Jawiya	37	(8)

International career
2014	Tunisia U23	3	(2)
2023-	Tunisia	11	(2)
- * Club domestic league appearances and goals as of 15:13, 21 January 2021 (UTC)

Haythem Jouini (Arabic: هيثم جويني; born 7 May 1993) is a Tunisian professional footballer who plays as a forward.

== Club career ==
=== Espérance Tunis ===
A youth exponent from Espérance de Tunis, Jouini was promoted to the first team in July 2012. He made his senior debut for the club on 10 November, coming on as a late substitute for Emmanuel Clottey in a 2–1 away win against Olympique Béja.

Jouini scored his first goal as a senior on 25 November 2012, netting the first in a 3–0 home win against Olympique du Kef. He scored a brace in a 5–1 home routing of JS Kairouan on 8 December, and added a hat-trick in a 4–1 success at Olympique du Kef the following 24 February, finishing his first senior season with eight goals.

Jouini appeared in 15 matches during the 2013–14 campaign, but scored only two goals as his side was crowned champions. He would only score another brace on 27 April 2016, netting Esperance's all goals in a 2–0 home win against CA Bizertin.

On 28 August 2016, Jouini extended his contract with Espérance until 2020.

==== Tenerife (loan) ====
On 31 August 2016, Jouini signed a one-year loan contract with CD Tenerife in the Spanish Segunda División. He made his debut for the club on 10 September, replacing Amath Diedhiou in a 1–0 home win against Real Valladolid.

Jouini scored his first goal abroad on 25 September 2016, but in a 3–2 away loss against CD Mirandés. Seven days later, after being granted his first start, he was sent off for simulating a penalty in a 0–0 home draw against Getafe CF.

=== Al-Ain ===
In January 2020, Jouini transferred to Saudi Arabian side Al-Ain.

=== Al Mokawloon Al Arab ===
In November 2020, Jouini transferred to Egyptian club Al Mokawloon Al Arab.

=== Al-Ahli Benghazi ===
In October 2021, Jouini transferred to Libyan club Al-Ahli Benghazi

=== Stade Tunisien ===
In August 2022, Jouini joined Tunisian club Stade Tunisien on a free transfer.

== International career ==
On 24 March 2023, Jouini made his debut for Tunisia in a 3–0 win over Libya in the 2023 Africa Cup of Nations qualification phase, scoring the 3rd goal of the game. Jouini would also score the only goal of the game 4 days later in a 1–0 win against the same opposition to cement Tunisia's spot at the top of group J.

== Career statistics ==
List of international goals scored by Haythem Jouini
No.	Date	Venue	Opponent	Score	Result	Competition
1	24 March 2023	Stade Olympique Hammadi Agrebi, Radès, Tunisia	Libya	3–0	3–0	2023 Africa Cup of Nations qualification
2	28 March 2023	Martyrs of February Stadium, Benghazi, Libya	Libya	1–0	1–0	2023 Africa Cup of Nations qualification

== Honours ==
Al-Quwa Al-Jawiya

- Iraq Stars League: 2025–26
