= Khaled Yahia =

Tunisian footballer

Personal information
- Date of birth: 10 August 1991 (age 35)
- Place of birth: Sousse, Tunisia
- Height: 1.75 m (5 ft 9 in)
- Position: Midfielder

Senior career*
Years	Team	Apps	(Gls)
2012–2014	Étoile du Sahel		
2014–2017	AS Marsa		
2017–2020	US Ben Guerdane		

International career
2015	Tunisia	1	(0)
- * Club domestic league appearances and goals

Khaled Yahia (born 10 August 1991) is a retired Tunisian football midfielder.
