= Daouda Camara =

Guinean footballer (born 1997)

Personal information
- Full name: Daouda Camara
- Date of birth: August 20, 1997 (age 29)
- Place of birth: Guinea
- Height: 1.70 m (5 ft 7 in)
- Position: Right winger

Team information
- Current team: Horoya AC

Senior career*
Years	Team	Apps	(Gls)
–2015	FC Séquence de Dixinn		
2015–	Horoya AC		

International career^{‡}
2017	Guinea U20		
2015–	Guinea	17	(0)
- * Club domestic league appearances and goals ‡ National team caps and goals as of 18 March 2019

Daouda Camara (born 20 August 1997) is a Guinean footballer. He usually plays as a right winger but also is proficient as an attacking midfielder and left winger.
