= Bernard Bulbwa =

Nigerian professional footballer

Personal information
- Full name: Bernard Tsumega Bulbwa
- Date of birth: 11 October 1996 (age 30)
- Place of birth: Nigeria
- Height: 1.66 m (5 ft 5 in)
- Position: Forward

Team information
- Current team: Ankaraspor

Youth career
- Mkar Rocks
- 2012–2015: Shuttle Sports Academy

Senior career*
Years	Team	Apps	(Gls)
2015–2017	Espérance	12	(2)
2017–2018	Espérance B		
2018–2019	Mouloudia Oujda	3	(0)
2019–2020	Dugopolje	19	(2)
2020–2021	Ankaraspor	6	(0)
2021	Al-Nahda		

International career
- Nigeria U20
- * Club domestic league appearances and goals as of 7 January 2022

Bernard Tsumega Bulbwa (born 11 October 1996) is a Nigerian professional footballer who plays as a striker.

== Early and personal life ==
Bulbwa is the youngest of seven children.

== Club career ==
After playing youth football for Mkar Rocks and Shuttle Sports Academy, Bulbwa signed a five-year contract with Tunisian club Espérance in April 2015. Earlier that month he had been linked with possible transfers to English clubs Stoke City and Manchester City, as well as clubs in Nigeria and Europe.

== International career ==
Bulbwa has played for the Nigeria under-20 team, and scored the winner in the final of the 2015 African U-20 Championship. He was described as a "hero" due to his performance, and his goal was awarded "Best of the Tournament" by CAF. He was selected to the 2015 FIFA U-20 World Cup in May 2015.
