= Hassen Harbaoui =

Tunisian footballer

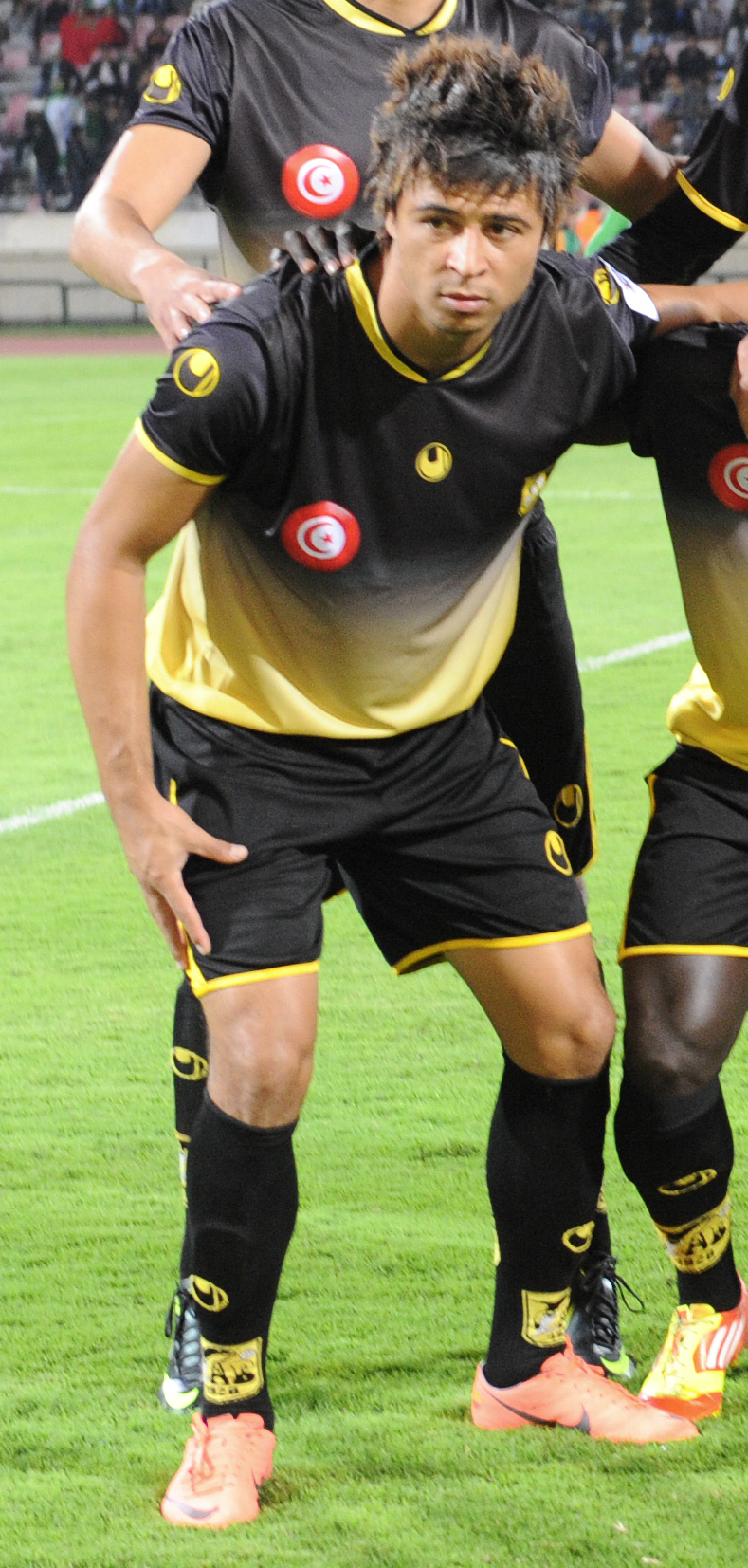

Personal information
- Date of birth: 3 October 1987 (age 39)
- Position: Forward

Senior career*
Years	Team	Apps	(Gls)
2010–2014	CA Bizertin		
2013	→ CS Hammam-Lif (loan)		
2014–2015	Espérance Tunis		
2015–2016	CS Sfaxien		
2016–2017	Olympique Béja		
2017–2018	US Ben Guerdane		
- * Club domestic league appearances and goals

Hassen Harbaoui (born 3 October 1987) is a retired Tunisian football striker.
