= Tunis derby =

Association football rivalry in Tunisia

Tunis Derby
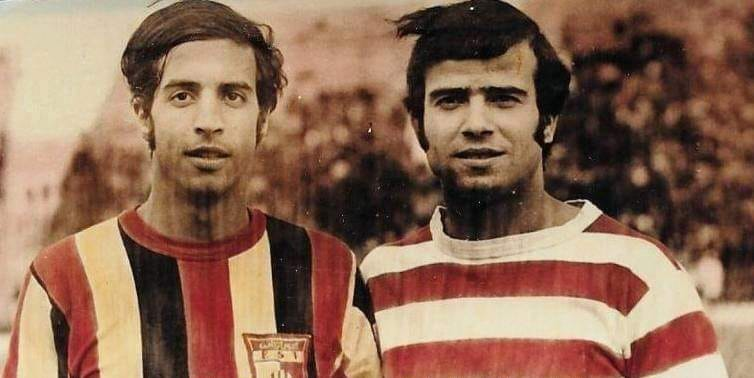
- Other names: The Meeting of the Neighbors
- Sport: Football
- Location: Tunis, Tunisia
- Teams: Club Africain; Espérance de Tunis
- First meeting: CA 3–0 EST; Tunisian League (23 March 1924)
- Latest meeting: CA 0–0 EST; Tunisian League (22 November 2026)
- Broadcasters: (Tunisia) Watania 1 (Qatar) Al Kass Channels
- Stadiums: Chedly Zouiten Stadium (1923–67); El Menzah Stadium (1967–01); Hammadi Agrebi Stadium (2001–present); Stade Mustapha Ben Jannet (2019)

Statistics
- Total meetings: 214
- Most player appearances: Wissem Ben Yahia (30)
- Top scorer: Hassen Bayou (9)
- All-time record: Espérance de Tunis: 89; Drawn: 69; Club Africain: 56
- Largest victory: CA 5–1 EST; Tunisian League (1985)
- Longest unbeaten streak: EST (17 Matches) (1998–2007)

In Tunisian football, the Tunis derby is the local derby between the two major clubs in the city of Tunis, Tunisia – Club Africain and Espérance de Tunis. The derby is played in Tunis in the [[Hammadi Agrebi Stadium|Hammadi Agrebi]] stadium due to its larger capacity of 60,000 seats. Before the construction of this stadium, the derby was played in the 45,000-seat-capacity El Menzah Stadium.

== History ==
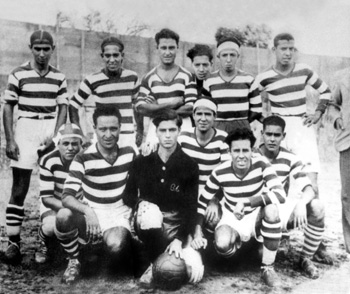
Club africain in 1934

The derbies between the Club Africain (CA) and Espérance de Tunis (EST) start during the season 1923–1924, when the African Club joins the EST in second series (promotion 1): the first official derby, which takes place on March 23, 1924, at the Ariana on behalf of the fifth day of the championship of the second series, is won by the African Club (3-0). Tunisia's first Cup derby, which takes place on October 10, 1926, at the Vélodrome on the occasion of the round of 32, is won by the African Club (1-0). In the context of the Tunisian Cup competitions, six derbys opposed the two teams before independence: one is won by the African Club in 1926, one ends with a draw and four by a victory of the Espérance sportive de Tunis, including two in the semifinals, in 1939 and 1947–1948.

The two teams entered into direct competition in the spring of 1933 and are now playing in the same division, with the exception of one season, sporting competition and competition between them taking over any desire to merge. It is at this period that, competition compels, are forged images truncated or at least oriented or manipulated of a city club and aristocrat for the African Club, solidly anchored in his stronghold of Bab Jedid, in opposition to his opponent being more popular and going to settle in Bab Souika. If this vision develops from the profiles of the leaders of the two clubs, the clubs certainly have more beldis among their ranks, no basis either supports or confirms this difference. On the contrary, the players of the African Club have, from time immemorial, of diverse social and geographical origins and it is the same for their supporters. The African Club and the EST play together in the elite from the 1937–1938 season, the EST having secured its accession to the first series at the end of the 1935–1936 season, the African Club l having joined a year later. The first derby in Ligue I took place on September 26, 1937, during the second day of the 1937–1938 season, and ended with a draw (1-1).

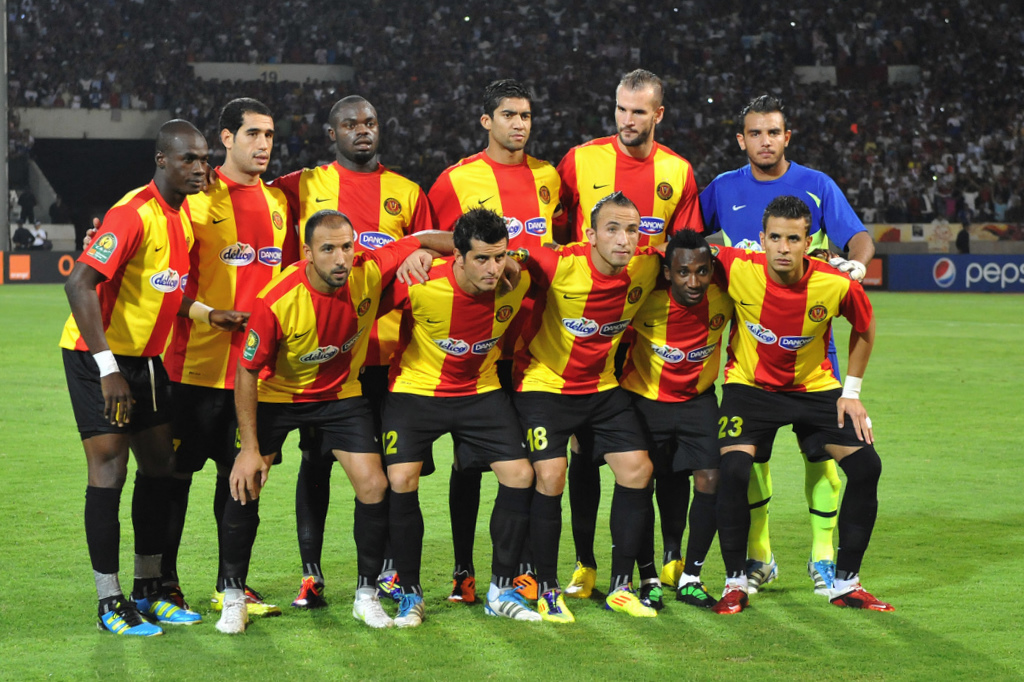
ES Tunis in 2011

On November 13, 1955, clubman Mounir Kebaili scored in the 65th minute the first goal in the history of the derby since the independence of the country, his teammate Ridha Meddeb doubling the lead in the 71st and allowing his club to win on the score of 2 to 0 against Espérance sportive de Tunis. In 1969, the two clubs meet for the first time in the final of the Tunisian Cup: the African Club won on a score of 2 to 0 thanks to goals scored by Abderrahmane Rahmouni and Tahar Chaibi. The following year, while the African Club leads 1–0 at half-time, the players Esperance Sports Tunis decide not to return to the field for the second half following a corner disputed by the referee in the 41st minute; the FTF decides to replay the game which sees the African Club win on the score of 1 to 0.

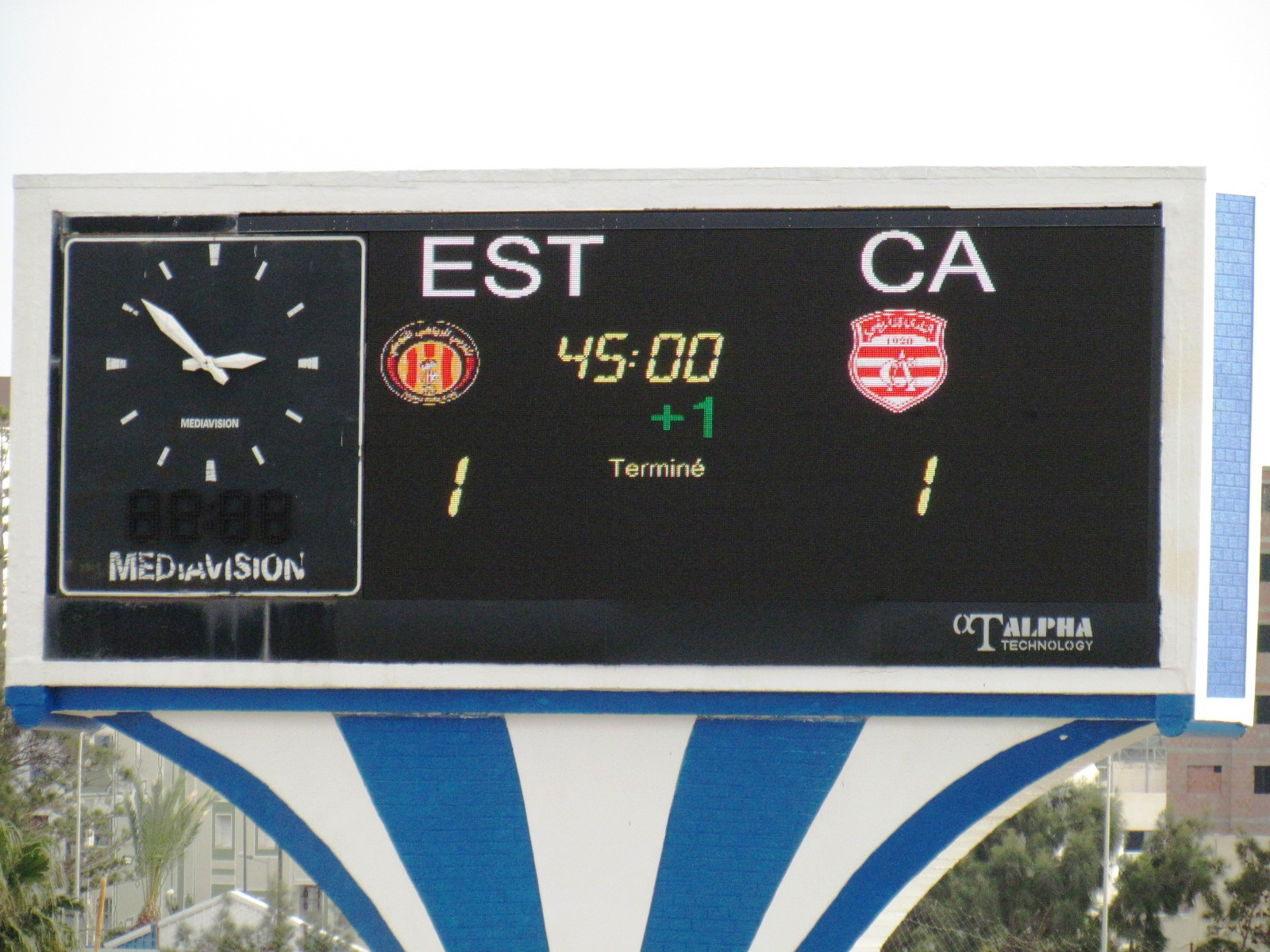
Le résultat du match de derby au tableau de Stade Mustapha Ben Jannet le 6 janvier 2019

On May 5, 1985, the African club won the match 5–1, causing their opponent his second biggest loss in a derby after the 1978 which ended in a score of 5 to 2. In 1995, while Esperance sportive de Tunis lead on a score of 4–0 in the 70th minute, the referee expels the fourth club player and stops the match. In 2006, after a long struggle of 120 minutes, Espérance sportive de Tunis won on penalties in the final of the Tunisian Cup. On January 27, 2007, after nine years without a win, the African Club won with a goal at the 87th Moussa Pokong. On May 1, 2010, for the first time in the league, a derby is played behind closed doors. The longest undefeated period for the African Club takes place between the seasons 1937-1938 and 1947-1948 (seven seasons played in eleven years, four seasons having been canceled due to World War II); EST is experiencing such a period between the 1998–1999 season and the first leg of the 2006–2007 season (8.5 seasons).

During the 2014–2015 season, the derby of the return phase of the championship, decisive for separating the two clubs of the capital on the one hand and the Etoile Sportive du Sahel on the other hand, is held on May 12, 2015. Designated « derby of the century "by some Tunisian media, the match ends with the victory of the club players, future champions of this season by a goal to zero. On January 6, 2019, for the first time in derby history, he plays outside the capital in Monastir due to the closure of the Rades Stadium due to maintenance. Esperance won 2-1

== Results ==
=== Before Independence ===
Espérance de Tunis win Draw Club Africain win

Season	Home	Score	Away	Venue
1923-1924	ES Tunis	0–3	Club Africain	Vélodrome Stadium
1923-1924	Club Africain	0–3	ES Tunis	Vélodrome Stadium
1924-1925	The two teams are in different sections			
1925-1926	Club Africain	4–1	ES Tunis	Vélodrome Stadium
1926-1927	Club Africain	1–1	ES Tunis	Vélodrome Stadium
1926-1927	ES Tunis	1–1	Club Africain	Vélodrome Stadium
1927-1928	ES Tunis	2–0	Club Africain	Vélodrome Stadium
1927-1928	Club Africain	0–2	ES Tunis	Vélodrome Stadium
1928-1932	The two teams are in different sections			
1932-1933	ES Tunis	1–1	Club Africain	Vélodrome Stadium
1932-1933	Club Africain	0–2	ES Tunis	Vélodrome Stadium
1933-1934	ES Tunis	2–1	Club Africain	Vélodrome Stadium
1933-1934	Club Africain	0–2	ES Tunis	Vélodrome Stadium
1934-1935	ES Tunis	0–2	Club Africain	Vélodrome Stadium
1934-1935	Club Africain	0–0	ES Tunis	Vélodrome Stadium
1935-1936	Club Africain	0–2	ES Tunis	Vélodrome Stadium
1935-1936	ES Tunis	2–1	Club Africain	Vélodrome Stadium
1936-1937	The two teams are in different sections			
1937-1938	Club Africain	1–1	ES Tunis	Vélodrome Stadium
1937-1938	ES Tunis	1–1	Club Africain	Vélodrome Stadium
1938-1939	Club Africain	1–0	ES Tunis	Vélodrome Stadium
1938-1939	ES Tunis	1–1	Club Africain	Vélodrome Stadium
1939-1940	No Competition			
1940-1941	No Competition			
1941-1942	ES Tunis	1–0	Club Africain	Chedly Zouiten Stadium
1941-1942	Club Africain	2–4	ES Tunis	Chedly Zouiten Stadium
1946-1947	ES Tunis	1–1	Club Africain	Chedly Zouiten Stadium
1946-1947	Club Africain	0–0	ES Tunis	Chedly Zouiten Stadium
1947-1948	ES Tunis	0–2	Club Africain	Chedly Zouiten Stadium
1947-1948	Club Africain	1–0	ES Tunis	Chedly Zouiten Stadium
1948-1949	Club Africain	3–4	ES Tunis	Chedly Zouiten Stadium
1948-1949	ES Tunis	1–3	Club Africain	Chedly Zouiten Stadium
1949-1950	ES Tunis	0–0	Club Africain	Chedly Zouiten Stadium
1949-1950	Club Africain	1–0	ES Tunis	Chedly Zouiten Stadium
1950-1951	ES Tunis	3–1	Club Africain	Chedly Zouiten Stadium
1950-1951	Club Africain	2–1	ES Tunis	Chedly Zouiten Stadium
1951-1952	Club Africain	2–2	ES Tunis	Chedly Zouiten Stadium
1951-1952	No Competition			
1952-1953	The two teams are in different sections			
1953-1954	ES Tunis	2–0	Club Africain	Chedly Zouiten Stadium
1953-1954	ES Tunis	0–1	Club Africain	Chedly Zouiten Stadium
1954-1955	Club Africain	0–1	ES Tunis	Chedly Zouiten Stadium
1954-1955	ES Tunis	4–3	Club Africain	Chedly Zouiten Stadium

=== Tunisian League 1 ===
==== Tunisian National Championship ====
Season	Home	Score	Away	Venue
1955-1956	Club Africain	2–1	ES Tunis	Chedly Zouiten Stadium
1955-1956	ES Tunis	3–1	Club Africain	Chedly Zouiten Stadium
1956-1957	ES Tunis	3–0	Club Africain	Chedly Zouiten Stadium
1956-1957	Club Africain	1–1	ES Tunis	Chedly Zouiten Stadium
1957-1958	ES Tunis	1–1	Club Africain	Chedly Zouiten Stadium
1957-1958	Club Africain	0–0	ES Tunis	Chedly Zouiten Stadium
1958-1959	ES Tunis	2–3	Club Africain	Chedly Zouiten Stadium
1958-1959	Club Africain	1–1	ES Tunis	Chedly Zouiten Stadium
1959-1960	ES Tunis	2–1	Club Africain	Chedly Zouiten Stadium
1959-1960	Club Africain	2–1	ES Tunis	Chedly Zouiten Stadium
1960-1961	Club Africain	1–2	ES Tunis	Chedly Zouiten Stadium
1960-1961	Club Africain	1–2	ES Tunis	Chedly Zouiten Stadium
1961-1962	ES Tunis	2–1	Club Africain	Chedly Zouiten Stadium
1961-1962	Club Africain	0–2	ES Tunis	Chedly Zouiten Stadium
1962-1963	ES Tunis	0–0	Club Africain	Chedly Zouiten Stadium
1962-1963	Club Africain	0–1	ES Tunis	Chedly Zouiten Stadium
1963-1964	ES Tunis	0–0	Club Africain	Chedly Zouiten Stadium
1963-1964	ES Tunis	2–0	Club Africain	Chedly Zouiten Stadium
1964-1965	Club Africain	1–1	ES Tunis	Chedly Zouiten Stadium
1964-1965	ES Tunis	1–1	Club Africain	Chedly Zouiten Stadium
1965-1966	ES Tunis	1–0	Club Africain	Chedly Zouiten Stadium
1965-1966	Club Africain	2–0	ES Tunis	Chedly Zouiten Stadium
1966-1967	Club Africain	1–1	ES Tunis	El Menzah Stadium
1966-1967	ES Tunis	0–0	Club Africain	El Menzah Stadium
1967-1968	Club Africain	1–2	ES Tunis	El Menzah Stadium
1967-1968	ES Tunis	0–2	Club Africain	El Menzah Stadium
1968-1969	Club Africain	0–1	ES Tunis	El Menzah Stadium
1968-1969	ES Tunis	0–2	Club Africain	El Menzah Stadium
1969-1970	ES Tunis	0–1	Club Africain	El Menzah Stadium
1969-1970	ES Tunis	2–0	Club Africain	El Menzah Stadium
1970-1971	Club Africain	0–1	ES Tunis	El Menzah Stadium
1970-1971	ES Tunis	0–0	Club Africain	El Menzah Stadium
1971-1972	Club Africain	0–3	ES Tunis	El Menzah Stadium
1971-1972	ES Tunis	0–0	Club Africain	El Menzah Stadium
1972-1973	Club Africain	1–0	ES Tunis	El Menzah Stadium
1972-1973	ES Tunis	2–0	Club Africain	El Menzah Stadium
1973-1974	Club Africain	1–2	ES Tunis	El Menzah Stadium
1973-1974	ES Tunis	2–0	Club Africain	El Menzah Stadium
1974-1975	Club Africain	1–1	ES Tunis	El Menzah Stadium
1974-1975	ES Tunis	1–2	Club Africain	El Menzah Stadium
1975-1976	Club Africain	4–1	ES Tunis	El Menzah Stadium
1975-1976	ES Tunis	0–1	Club Africain	El Menzah Stadium
1976-1977	ES Tunis	1–1	Club Africain	El Menzah Stadium
1976-1977	Club Africain	4–3	ES Tunis	El Menzah Stadium
1977-1978	ES Tunis	0–0	Club Africain	El Menzah Stadium
1977-1978	Club Africain	5–2	ES Tunis	El Menzah Stadium
1978-1979	ES Tunis	0–1	Club Africain	El Menzah Stadium
1978-1979	Club Africain	1–0	ES Tunis	El Menzah Stadium
1979-1980	ES Tunis	0–0	Club Africain	El Menzah Stadium
1979-1980	Club Africain	0–0	ES Tunis	El Menzah Stadium
1980-1981	ES Tunis	1–1	Club Africain	El Menzah Stadium
1980-1981	Club Africain	0–1	ES Tunis	El Menzah Stadium
1981-1982	ES Tunis	1–1	Club Africain	El Menzah Stadium
1981-1982	ES Tunis	2–0	Club Africain	El Menzah Stadium
1982-1983	Club Africain	1–1	ES Tunis	El Menzah Stadium
1982-1983	Club Africain	3–1	ES Tunis	El Menzah Stadium
1983-1984	ES Tunis	0–0	Club Africain	El Menzah Stadium
1983-1984	Club Africain	2–1	ES Tunis	El Menzah Stadium
1984-1985	Club Africain	5–1	ES Tunis	El Menzah Stadium
1984-1985	ES Tunis	1–0	Club Africain	El Menzah Stadium
1985-1986	Club Africain	0–0	ES Tunis	El Menzah Stadium
1985-1986	ES Tunis	2–1	Club Africain	El Menzah Stadium
1986-1987	Club Africain	1–1	ES Tunis	El Menzah Stadium
1986-1987	ES Tunis	1–1	Club Africain	El Menzah Stadium
1987-1988	Club Africain	1–1	ES Tunis	El Menzah Stadium
1987-1988	ES Tunis	0–0	Club Africain	El Menzah Stadium
1988-1989	Club Africain	2–0	ES Tunis	El Menzah Stadium
1988-1989	ES Tunis	2–0	Club Africain	El Menzah Stadium
1989-1990	ES Tunis	4–2	Club Africain	El Menzah Stadium
1989-1990	Club Africain	1–1	ES Tunis	El Menzah Stadium
1990-1991	Club Africain	3–0	ES Tunis	El Menzah Stadium
1990-1991	ES Tunis	0–0	Club Africain	El Menzah Stadium
1991-1992	Club Africain	1–3	ES Tunis	El Menzah Stadium
1991-1992	ES Tunis	0–0	Club Africain	El Menzah Stadium
1992-1993	Club Africain	2–2	ES Tunis	El Menzah Stadium
1992-1993	ES Tunis	2–1	Club Africain	El Menzah Stadium
1993-1994	Club Africain	2–2	ES Tunis	El Menzah Stadium
1993-1994	ES Tunis	2–0	Club Africain	El Menzah Stadium

==== Tunisian Ligue Professionnelle 1 ====
#	Date	Home team	Score	Away team	Goals (home)	Goals (away)	Venue
77	20 November 1994	Espérance de Tunis	4–0	Club Africain	Berkhissa 11', 53', Hamrouni 45', Thabet 65'	—	El Menzah Stadium
78	14 May 1995	Club Africain	1–1	Espérance de Tunis			El Menzah Stadium
79	1995	Espérance de Tunis	1–1	Club Africain	Gabsi 53'	Sellimi 45+1'	El Menzah Stadium
80	1996	Club Africain	0–0	Espérance de Tunis	—	—	El Menzah Stadium
81	16 November 1996	Espérance de Tunis	1–0	Club Africain	Laaroussi 13'	—	El Menzah Stadium
82	13 April 1997	Club Africain	0–2	Espérance de Tunis	—	Jaïdi 48', Laaroussi 74'	El Menzah Stadium
83	25 March 1997	Club Africain	1–1	Espérance de Tunis			El Menzah Stadium
84	19 October 1998	Espérance de Tunis	1–2	Club Africain	Badra 37'	Zdiri 43', Roussi 49'	El Menzah Stadium
85	1 April 1998	Club Africain	0–1	Espérance de Tunis	—	Jaidi 54'	El Menzah Stadium
86	23 May 1999	Espérance de Tunis	4–0	Club Africain	Agoye 19', 29', Thabet 33', Zitouni 67'	—	El Menzah Stadium
87	18 December 1999	Espérance de Tunis	4–0	Club Africain	Kanzari 27', Julius Aghahowa 66', Zitouni 72' 77'	—	El Menzah Stadium
88	20 May 2000	Club Africain	1–2	Espérance de Tunis	Zitoun 27'	Badra 46', Zitouni 90'	El Menzah Stadium
89	18 November 2000	Espérance de Tunis	2–0	Club Africain	Reinaldo Aleluia 33', Hassen Gabsi 87'	—	El Menzah Stadium
90	7 April 2001	Club Africain	1–1	Espérance de Tunis	Chouchane 49'	Reinaldo Aleluia 72'	El Menzah Stadium
91	25 November 2001	Espérance de Tunis	3–0	Club Africain	Traoré 18', 66', Reinaldo Aleluia 57' (pen.)	—	El Menzah Stadium
92	17 March 2002	Club Africain	1–2	Espérance de Tunis	Badara 15'	Melki 23', Zaâlani 47' (o.g.)	Hammadi Agrebi Stadium
93	15 December 2002	Espérance de Tunis	2–0	Club Africain	Traoré (?)	—	Hammadi Agrebi Stadium
94	4 April 2003	Club Africain	0–1	Espérance de Tunis	—	Benie 70'	Hammadi Agrebi Stadium
95	28 September 2003	Espérance de Tunis	0–0	Club Africain	—	—	Hammadi Agrebi Stadium
96	9 May 2004	Club Africain	1–1	Espérance de Tunis	Selliti 45'	Melki 32'	Hammadi Agrebi Stadium
97	19 December 2004	Espérance de Tunis	1–1	Club Africain	Chaâbani 48' (pen.)	Selliti 90'	Hammadi Agrebi Stadium
98	17 April 2005	Club Africain	2–2	Espérance de Tunis	Chaâbani 24' (o.g.), Traoré 32'	Kasdaoui 45+2', Chaâbani 88'	Hammadi Agrebi Stadium
99	25 September 2005	Espérance de Tunis	2–0	Club Africain	Jabeur 49', Ltaïef 83'	—	Hammadi Agrebi Stadium
100	26 February 2006	Club Africain	1–2	Espérance de Tunis	Gharzoul 90+3'	Mahjoubi 28', Ltifi 33' (pen.)	Hammadi Agrebi Stadium
101	19 August 2006	Espérance de Tunis	1–1	Club Africain	Hammami 79'	Ghannem 66'	Hammadi Agrebi Stadium
102	20 January 2007	Club Africain	1–0	Espérance de Tunis	Pokong 89'	—	Hammadi Agrebi Stadium
103	25 November 2007	Club Africain	1–0	Espérance de Tunis	Ouertani 73'	—	Hammadi Agrebi Stadium
104	1 May 2008	Espérance de Tunis	0–1	Club Africain	—	Chaâbani 68' (o.g.)	Hammadi Agrebi Stadium
105	9 November 2008	Espérance de Tunis	2–2	Club Africain	Eneramo 22' (pen.), Darragi 28'	Tchalla 15', 18'	Hammadi Agrebi Stadium
106	1 March 2009	Club Africain	3–0	Espérance de Tunis	Z. Dhaouadi 27', Sellami 53' (pen.), 59'	—	Hammadi Agrebi Stadium
107	5 December 2009	Espérance de Tunis	1–1	Club Africain	Bienvenu 24'	Amri 59'	Hammadi Agrebi Stadium
108	1 May 2010	Club Africain	0–0	Espérance de Tunis	—	—	Hammadi Agrebi Stadium
109	21 November 2010	Club Africain	2–2	Espérance de Tunis	Z. Dhaouadi 29', Aouadhi 84'	Eneramo 24' (pen.), Hichri 89'	Hammadi Agrebi Stadium
110	26 June 2011	Espérance de Tunis	2–1	Club Africain	Darragi 1', Msakni 73'	Ben Yahia 58'	Hammadi Agrebi Stadium
111	11 April 2012	Club Africain	1–2	Espérance de Tunis	N'Douassel 41'	Msakni 71', Aouadhi 80'	Hammadi Agrebi Stadium
112	26 September 2012	Espérance de Tunis	3–2	Club Africain	Msakni 11', 39', N'Djeng 57'	Zitouni 14', Jaziri 90+4'	Hammadi Agrebi Stadium
113	15 December 2012	Club Africain	2–1	Espérance de Tunis	Hedhli 45+3', Djabou 47'	N'Djeng 77'	Hammadi Agrebi Stadium
114	31 March 2013	Espérance de Tunis	3–1	Club Africain	Afful 8', C. Dhaouadi 39', Belaïli 48'	Ifa 16' (pen.)	Hammadi Agrebi Stadium
115	12 May 2013	Espérance de Tunis	1–0	Club Africain	Aouadhi 64'	—	Hammadi Agrebi Stadium
116	26 May 2013	Club Africain	0–1	Espérance de Tunis	—	Ragued 82'	Hammadi Agrebi Stadium
117	30 November 2013	Club Africain	2–0	Espérance de Tunis	Z. Dhaouadi 25', 84'	—	Hammadi Agrebi Stadium
118	16 March 2014	Espérance de Tunis	2–0	Club Africain	C. Dhaouadi 15', Jouini 65'	—	Hammadi Agrebi Stadium
119	24 December 2014	Espérance de Tunis	2–2	Club Africain	N'Djeng 80', 88'	Djabou 15', Belaïd 57'	Hammadi Agrebi Stadium
120	12 May 2015	Club Africain	1–0	Espérance de Tunis	Miniaoui 42'	—	Hammadi Agrebi Stadium
121	14 October 2015	Club Africain	0–2	Espérance de Tunis	—	Ben Youssef 78', Mhirsi 89'	Hammadi Agrebi Stadium
122	3 April 2016	Espérance de Tunis	2–1	Club Africain	C. Dhaouadi 45', Jouini 79'	Ayadi 35'	Hammadi Agrebi Stadium
123	30 October 2016	Espérance de Tunis	1–1	Club Africain	Badri 3'	Chenihi 20'	Hammadi Agrebi Stadium
124	9 February 2017	Club Africain	1–0	Espérance de Tunis	Khalifa 90'	—	Hammadi Agrebi Stadium
125	1 March 2017	Espérance de Tunis	2–1	Club Africain	Bguir 22', Badri 66'	Chenihi 71'	Hammadi Agrebi Stadium
126	30 April 2017	Club Africain	0–2	Espérance de Tunis	—	Khenissi 8', Ben Youssef 40'	Hammadi Agrebi Stadium
127	3 December 2017	Espérance de Tunis	1–0	Club Africain	Sassi 41' (pen.)	—	Hammadi Agrebi Stadium
128	18 February 2018	Club Africain	2–1	Espérance de Tunis	Ben Yahia 45', Belaïd 66'	Ben-Hatira 6'	Hammadi Agrebi Stadium
129	6 January 2019	Espérance de Tunis	2–1	Club Africain	Khenissi 16', 56'	Chamakhi 27'	Mustapha Ben Jannet Stadium
130	9 June 2019	Club Africain	2–1	Espérance de Tunis	Chamakhi 30', Haddad 56'	Bguir 44'	Hammadi Agrebi Stadium
131	19 January 2020	Espérance de Tunis	2–1	Club Africain	Khenissi 29' (pen.), Coulibaly 82'	Jaziri 42'	Hammadi Agrebi Stadium
132	26 August 2020	Club Africain	0–0	Espérance de Tunis	—	—	Hammadi Agrebi Stadium
133	31 January 2021	Espérance de Tunis	1–0	Club Africain	Badri 76'	—	Hammadi Agrebi Stadium
134	5 May 2021	Club Africain	1–1	Espérance de Tunis	Chamakhi 83'	Ben Romdhane 89' (pen.)	Hammadi Agrebi Stadium
135	8 May 2022	Club Africain	0–0	Espérance de Tunis	—	—	Hammadi Agrebi Stadium
136	19 June 2022	Espérance de Tunis	3–1	Club Africain	Tougai 20', Coulibaly 44', Elhouni 90+2'	Dhaouadi 34' (pen.)	Hammadi Agrebi Stadium
137	7 May 2023	Club Africain	1–0	Espérance de Tunis	H. Labidi 81'	—	Hammadi Agrebi Stadium
138	27 June 2023	Espérance de Tunis	0–0	Club Africain	—	—	Hammadi Agrebi Stadium
139	16 March 2024	Espérance de Tunis	1–0	Club Africain	Rodrigues 8'	—	Hammadi Agrebi Stadium
140	2 June 2024	Club Africain	1–2	Espérance de Tunis	Eduwo 90+11'	Sasse 3', Rodrigues 26'	Hammadi Agrebi Stadium
141	22 December 2024	Espérance de Tunis	2–2	Club Africain	Sasse 38', Tougai 44'	Youssef 8', Bouabid 82'	Hammadi Agrebi Stadium
142	20 April 2025	Club Africain	1–3	Espérance de Tunis	Labidi 45+2' (pen.)	Jelassi 12', Rodrigues 85' (pen.), Jabri 90+2'	Hammadi Agrebi Stadium
143	9 November 2025	Club Africain	0–0	Espérance de Tunis	—	—	Hammadi Agrebi Stadium
144	10 May 2026	Espérance de Tunis	0–1	Club Africain	—	Zaalouni 90+14'	Hammadi Agrebi Stadium
145	22 November 2026	Club Africain	0–0	Espérance de Tunis	—	—	Hammadi Agrebi Stadium
146	2027	Espérance de Tunis	v	Club Africain	—	—	Hammadi Agrebi Stadium

=== Tunisian Cup ===
Season	Round	Home	Score	Away	Venue
1927	First round	Club Africain	1–0	ES Tunis	Vélodrome Stadium
1934	First round	ES Tunis	3–2	Club Africain	Vélodrome Stadium
1939	Semi-finals	Club Africain	0–0	ES Tunis	Vélodrome Stadium
1939	Semi-finals (R)	ES Tunis	3–0	Club Africain	Vélodrome Stadium
1942	Round of 16	ES Tunis	2–0	Club Africain	Chedly Zouiten Stadium
1945	Quarter-finals	ES Tunis	3–0	Club Africain	Chedly Zouiten Stadium
1947	Semi-finals	ES Tunis	1–0	Club Africain	Chedly Zouiten Stadium
1965	Round of 8	Club Africain	1–0	ES Tunis	Chedly Zouiten Stadium
1966	Round of 8	ES Tunis	0–0	Club Africain	Chedly Zouiten Stadium
1966	Round of 8 (R)	Club Africain	2–0	ES Tunis	Chedly Zouiten Stadium
1967	Quarter-finals	ES Tunis	2–2	Club Africain	El Menzah Stadium
1967	Quarter-finals (R)	Club Africain	1–0	ES Tunis	El Menzah Stadium
1969	Final	Club Africain	2–0	ES Tunis	El Menzah Stadium
1970	Round of 8	ES Tunis	1–1	Club Africain	El Menzah Stadium
1970	Round of 8 (R)	Club Africain	2–0	ES Tunis	El Menzah Stadium
1976	Final	ES Tunis	1–1	Club Africain	El Menzah Stadium
1976	Final (R)	Club Africain	0–0 (3 - 1 p)	ES Tunis	El Menzah Stadium
1980	Final	ES Tunis	2–0	Club Africain	El Menzah Stadium
1983	Quarter-finals	Club Africain	3–1	ES Tunis	El Menzah Stadium
1986	Final	ES Tunis	0–0 (4 - 1 p)	Club Africain	El Menzah Stadium
1989	Final	ES Tunis	2–0	Club Africain	El Menzah Stadium
1992	Round of 8	Club Africain	1–0	ES Tunis	El Menzah Stadium
1996	Quarter-finals	ES Tunis	1–0	Club Africain	El Menzah Stadium
1998	Semi-finals	Club Africain	1–0	ES Tunis	El Menzah Stadium
1999	Final	ES Tunis	2–1	Club Africain	El Menzah Stadium
2005	Semi-finals	ES Tunis	4–0	Club Africain	[[Hammadi Agrebi Stadium|Stade de Radès]]
2006	Final	ES Tunis	2–2 (5 - 4 p)	Club Africain	[[Hammadi Agrebi Stadium|Stade de Radès]]
2008	Round of 16	Club Africain	1–2	ES Tunis	[[Hammadi Agrebi Stadium|Stade de Radès]]
2016	Final	Club Africain	0–2	ES Tunis	[[Hammadi Agrebi Stadium|Stade de Radès]]

=== Tunisian League Cup results ===
Season	Home	Score	Away	Venue
2007	Club Africain	1–2	ES Tunis	El Menzah Stadium
2007	Club Africain	0–2	ES Tunis	El Menzah Stadium

=== Tunisian Super Cup results ===
Season	League Champion	Score	Cup Champion	Venue
1970	Espérance de Tunis	0–1	Club Africain	El Menzah Stadium
1979	Club Africain	1–0	Espérance de Tunis	El Menzah Stadium
2026	Club Africain	—	Espérance de Tunis	Hammadi Agrebi Stadium

== Statistics ==
As of 22 November 2026

Competition	Matches	Wins		Draws	Goals	
Competition	Matches	Espérance de Tunis	Club Africain	Draws	Espérance de Tunis	Club Africain
Before 1956	36	15	10	11	48	40
Ligue 1	145	58	34	53	174	131
Tunisian Cup	29	14	10	5	33	21
Tunisian League Cup	2	2	0	0	4	1
Tunisian Super Cup	2	0	2	0	0	2
Total	214	89	56	69	259	195

=== Top scorers ===
1. Hassen Bayou (Club Africain): 9 goals
2. Chedly Laaouini and Abdeljabar Machouche (Espérance de Tunis): 7 goals
3. Hedi Bayari and Zouheir Dhaouadi (Club Africain): 6 goals
4. Mohamed Salah Jedidi (Club Africain) and Ayadi Hamrouni (Espérance de Tunis): 5 goals

=== Participations ===
1. Wissem Ben Yahia (Club Africain): 30 derbies
2. Tarak Dhiab (Espérance de Tunis): 29 derbies
3. Sadok Sassi (Club Africain) and Khaled Ben Yahia (Espérance de Tunis): 27 derbies
4. Nabil Maâloul (ES Tunis, Club Africain): 26 derbies; 24 with Espérance de Tunis and 2 with Club Africain
5. Chokri El Ouaer (Espérance de Tunis): 24 derbies

== Tunisian Ligue Professionnelle 1 results ==
Season	55–56	56–57	57–58	58–59	59–60	60–61	61–62	62–63	63–64	64–65	65–66	66–67	67–68	68–69	69–70	70–71	71–72	72–73	73–74	74–75	75–76	76–77	77–78	78–79	79–80	80–81	81–82	82–83	83–84	84–85	85–86	86–87	87–88	88–89	89–90	90–91	91–92	92–93	93–94	94–95	95–96	96–97	97–98	98–99	99–00	00–01	01–02	02–03	03–04	04–05	05–06	06–07	07–08	08–09	09–10	10–11	11–12	12–13	13–14	14–15	15–16	16–17	17–18	18–19	19–20	20–21	21–22	22–23	23–24	24–25	25–26
EST	4	2	2	1	1	2	3	10	2	6	5	2	7	6	1	8	9	3	2	1	1	7	6	4	2	3	1	3	5	1	2	3	1	1	2	1	3	1	1	2	3	2	1	1	1	1	1	1	1	4	1	3	3	1	1	1	1	2	1	3	2	1	1	1	1	1	1	2	1	1	2
CA	3	4	6	5	3	8	4	5	1	2	6	1	2	2	2	2	2	1	1	2	3	2	2	1	1	2	2	2	4	2	3	2	3	2	1	2	1	5	3	4	1	5	2	6	5	3	3	3	3	3	2	2	1	2	2	4	6	4	4	1	6	3	2	5	5	7	4	3	6	4	1

== One club to another ==
Due to intense rivalry between the two clubs, few players have dared to play for both the African Club and Esperance Tunis during their career. Apart from Mohamed Bachtobji, Mohamed Ali Yaakoubi and Ali Abdi, all the others have passed through other clubs, whether in Tunisia or abroad, before playing with the Club Africain or Espérance sportive de Tunis.

=== Club Africain then Espérance de Tunis ===
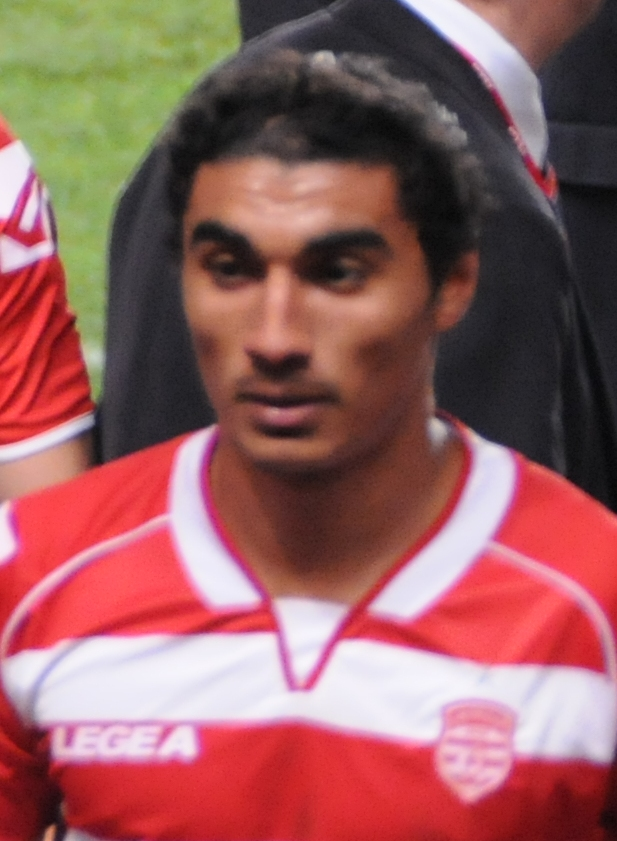
Seifeddine Akremi

- Ahmed Akaichi
- Mohamed Bachtobji
- Borhene Ghannem
- Walid Hichri
- Dramane Traore
- Khaled Mouelhi
- Karim Aouadhi
- Riadh Jelassi
- Seifeddine Akremi
- Mohamed Ali Yacoubi
- Hicham Belkaroui
- Farouk Ben Mustapha
- Rached Arfaoui
- Larry Azouni
- Chiheb Jebali

=== Espérance de Tunis then Club Africain ===
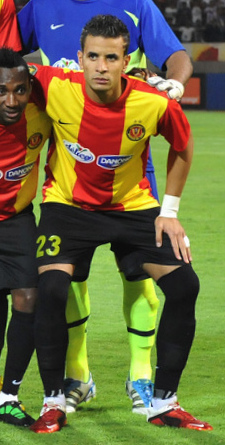
Khaled Korbi

- Slama Kasdaoui
- Anis Amri
- Khaled Korbi
- Nabil Maâloul
- Mohamed Torkhani
- Skander Sheikh
- Foued Slama
- Saber Khalifa
- Ali Abdi
- Oussama Darragi
- Rached Arfaoui
- Kingsley Eduwo
- Tayeb Meziani
- Oussama Shili
- Oussama Bouguerra
- Yassine Meriah
- Mootez Zaddem
- Ghassen Mahersi

== Arbitration ==
Fathi Bouseta is the most governing referee for Derby with six meetings.

In 1995, after the referee took out four red cards, the match was halted in the 70th minute by Esperance (4-0).

- Tunisian refereeing crew: 88 matches
- Foreign referee: 32 matches

== Popular culture ==
The Tunis derby has a huge fan base in Tunisia, especially in the capital and the Greater Tunis region. The derby match has been under preparation for several weeks in order to prepare flags and inputs, which are represented in giant calligraphic images.

Before the Tunisian revolution, derby matches were supported by the fans of the two teams during the revolution. 2016 Both fans were invited to the match and it was one of the greatest derby matches in Tunisian football history.

In 2026, the derby again drew major attention during the decisive late-season match between Espérance Sportive de Tunis and Club Africain. Club Africain won the match 1–0, with a dramatic stoppage-time goal that contributed to one of the most memorable endings in the rivalry’s modern history. The match was also marked by large-scale tifos, pyrotechnics and an exceptional stadium atmosphere, widely shared on social media and documented by international football content creators, including Thogden, helping to bring the Tunis derby to a broader global audience.

== Honours ==
Club Africain	Championship	Espérance de Tunis	Official
International (Official)
1	CAF Champions League	4	Yes
–	FIFA Club World Cup	–	Yes
–	CAF Confederation Cup	–	Yes
–	CAF Super Cup	1	Yes
–	CAF Cup (Defunct)	1	Yes
–	African Cup Winners' Cup (Defunct)	1	Yes
1	Afro-Asian Club Championship (Defunct)	1	Yes
2	Aggregate	8	
Domestic (Official)
14	Tunisian Ligue Professionnelle 1	34	Yes
13	Tunisian Cup	17	Yes
3	Tunisian Super Cup	8	Yes
–	League Cup (Defunct)	–	Yes
30	Aggregate	58	
International (Defunct and Non-official)
3	Maghreb Champions Cup (Defunct)	–	No
1	Maghreb Cup Winners Cup (Defunct)	–	No
4	Aggregate	0	
International (Non-official)
1	Arab Champions League	3	No
1	Arab Cup Winners' Cup (Defunct)	–	No
–	Arab Super Cup (Defunct)	1	No
2	Aggregate	4	
38	Total Aggregate	70	

== Handball ==
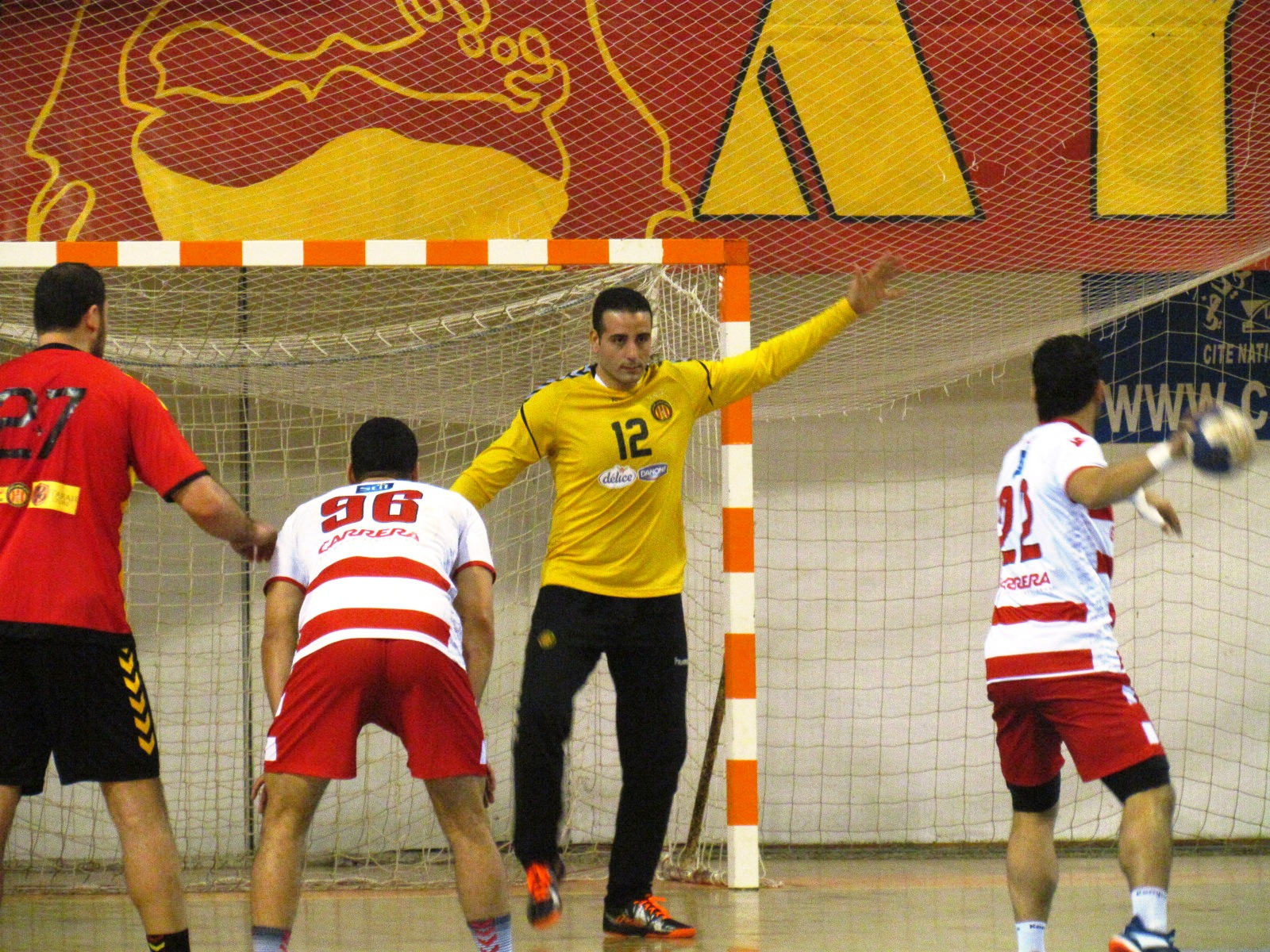
CA player taking a seven-meter throw during a handball derby in Tunis

The Tunis derby is also contested in men’s handball between Club Africain and Espérance Sportive de Tunis. The two clubs meet regularly in the national championship, domestic cup competitions, and continental tournaments, making their encounters among the most prominent fixtures in Tunisian handball. The rivalry often plays a decisive role in the race for domestic honours and attracts intense interest from supporters.

While the regular home matches are played at the clubs’ respective arenas, the derbies are usually held at the El Menzah Sports Palace, a central indoor arena in Tunis that has hosted handball and other sports since 1967.
