= 2022–23 Tunisian Cup =

Hédi Chaker Cup
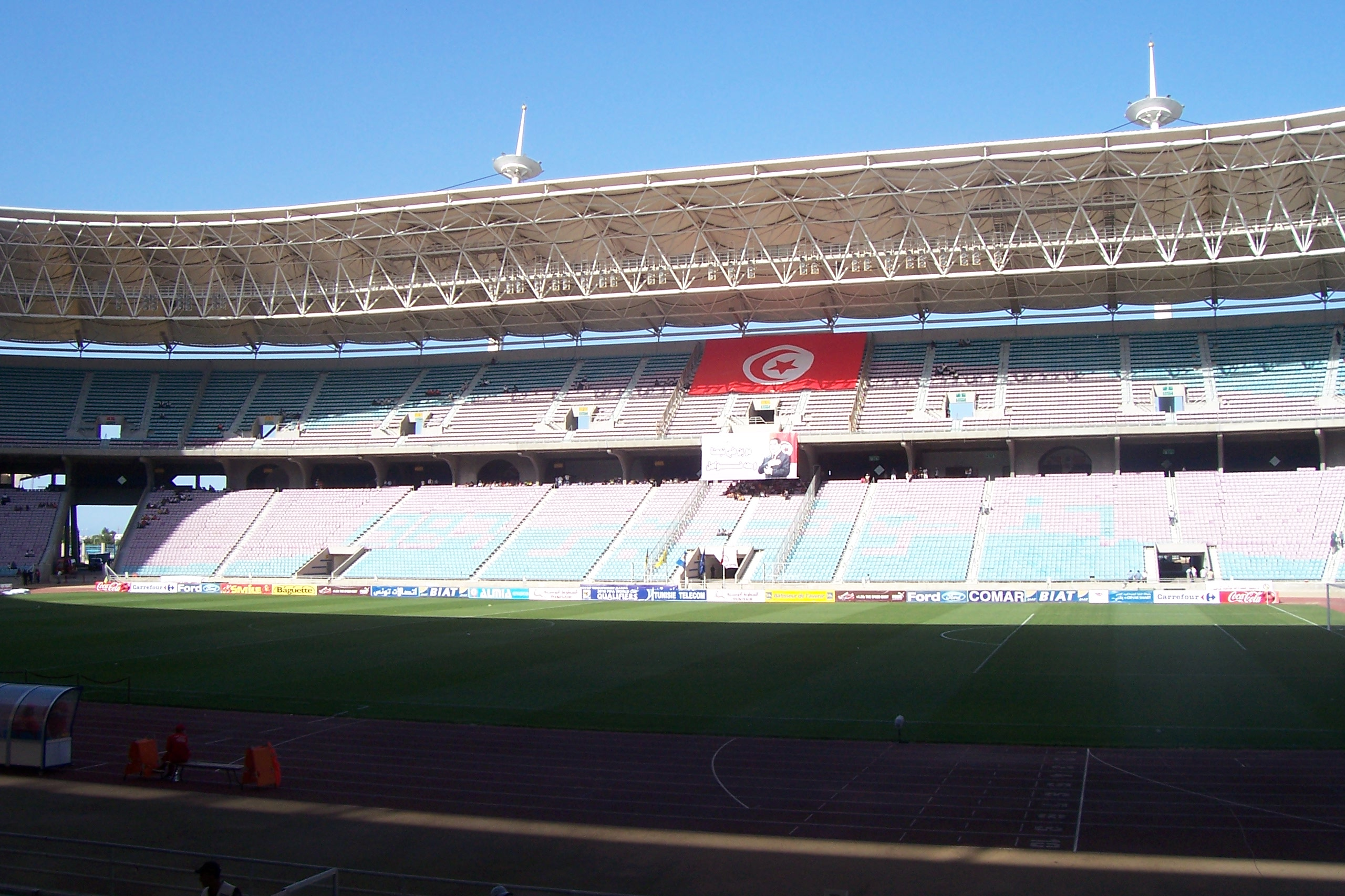
- Stade Hammadi Agrebi hosted the final

Tournament details
- Country: Tunisia

Final positions
- Champions: Olympique Béja (3rd title)
- Runners-up: Espérance de Tunis

Tournament statistics
- Matches played: 31
- Goals scored: 61 (1.97 per match)
- Top goal scorer(s): Hamdi Labidi (4 goals)
- (Note: All statistics do not include preliminary rounds)

The 2022–23 Tunisian Cup (Coupe de Tunisie or Hédi Chaker Cup) was the 91st season of the football cup competition of Tunisia. The competition was organized by the Tunisian Football Federation and open to all clubs in Tunisia.

== First preliminary round ==
15 January 2023	Croissant de M'saken (2)	1–0	Kalâa Sport (2)	M'saken
13:30		Report		Stadium: Stade du Rugby M'saken

15 January 2023	Espoir de Djerba (2)	Awarded	Espoir de Rogba (3)	Djerba
13:30		Report		Stadium: Midoun Municipal Stadium

15 January 2023	Jeunesse d'El Omrane (3)	Awarded	Stade Gabèsien (2)	Tunis
13:30		Report		Stadium: Complexe Tayeb Ben Ammar

15 January 2023	Club de Bembla (2)	0–0 (a.e.t.) (4–5 p)	Club de Korba (2)	Bembla
13:30		Report		Stadium: Stade Bembla

15 January 2023	Avenir de Marsa (3)	1–2	Étoile de Radès (2)	Tunis
13:30		Report		Stadium: Stade Abdelaziz Chtioui

15 January 2023	Association de Djerba (2)	0–1	Jeunesse Kairouanaise (2)	Djerba
13:30		Report		Stadium: Stade Houmet Es'Souk

15 January 2023	El Makarem de Mahdia (2)	3–0 (a.e.t.)	Jendouba Sport (2)	Mahdia
13:30		Report		Stadium: Stade Ahmed Khouaja

15 January 2023	Club de Hammam-Lif (2)	2–0	Sporting Moknine (3)	Tunis
13:30		Report		Stadium: Stade Bou Kornine

15 January 2023	Espérance de Zarzis (2)	2–3	Stade Sfaxien (2)	Zarzis
13:30		Report		Stadium: Stade Abdessalem Kazouz

15 January 2023	El Gawafel de Gafsa (2)	3–2 (a.e.t.)	Avenir de Mohamedia (2)	Gafsa
13:30		Report		Stadium: Stade Olympique de Gafsa

15 January 2023	Sporting Ben Arous (2)	1–1 (a.e.t.) (6–5 p)	Olympique Médenine (2)	Tunis
13:30		Report		Stadium: Stade Municipal de Ben Arous

18 January 2023	Avenir d'Oued Ellil (2)	2–4 (a.e.t.)	Avenir de Gabès (2)	Tunis
13:30		Report		Stadium: Stade Municipal de Mornaguia

== Second preliminary round ==
The draw for the second preliminary round was held on 23 January 2023.

27 January 2023	Club de Hammam-Lif (2)	1–0	Club de Korba (2)	Tunis
13:30		Report		Stadium: Stade Bou Kornine

27 January 2023	Jeunesse Kairouanaise (2)	0–0 (a.e.t.) (4–5 p)	Stade Sfaxien (2)	Kairouan
13:30		Report		Stadium: Stade Ali Zouaoui

27 January 2023	El Makarem de Mahdia (2)	1–0	Avenir de Gabès (2)	Mahdia
13:30		Report		Stadium: Stade Ahmed Khouaja

27 January 2023	Sporting Ben Arous (2)	0–2	FC Hammamet (3)	Tunis
13:30		Report		Stadium: Stade Municipal de Ben Arous

27 January 2023	Teboulbou Gabès (4)	0–4	Jeunesse d'El Omrane (3)	Gabès
13:30		Report		Stadium: Terrain de football Teboulbou

27 January 2023	FC Mdhila (4)	0–0 (a.e.t.) (4–5 p)	Croissant de M'saken (2)	Mdhila
13:30		Report		Stadium: Stade de Mdhila

27 January 2023	Espoir de Bou Hajla (4)	3–1	Astre de Zaouiet Sousse (4)	Bou Hajla
13:30		Report		Stadium: Stade Municipal de Bou Hajla

27 January 2023	Safia El Ksour (4)	1–2 (a.e.t.)	Gazelle de Bekalta (4)	El Ksour
13:30		Report		Stadium: Stade Municipal d'El Ksour

27 January 2023	El Gawafel de Gafsa (2)	2–1	US Ksibet El Mediouni (3)	Gafsa
13:30		Report		Stadium: Stade Olympique de Gafsa

27 January 2023	Stade Sidi Makhlouf (4)	0–1	Étoile de Radès (2)	Sidi Makhlouf
13:30		Report		Stadium: Stade Municipal de Sidi Makhlouf

27 January 2023	Al Ahly Hajri (3)	0–2	Union de Bou Salem (3)	Bouhjar
13:30		Report		Stadium: Stade Municipal de Bouhjar

27 January 2023	Association d'El Battan (4)	0–1	Palme de Tozeur (3)	El Battan
13:30		Report		Stadium: Stade Municipal d'El Battan

27 January 2023	Progrès de Sakiet Eddaïer (4)	0–0 (a.e.t.) (3–4 p)	Avenir de Kasserine (3)	Sakiet Eddaïer
13:30		Report		Stadium: Stade Municipal de Sakiet Eddaïer

27 January 2023	Espoir de Bouchamma (4)	2–2 (a.e.t.) (4–5 p)	Stade Africain Menzel Bourguiba (3)	Bouchamma
13:30		Report		Stadium: Stade Municipal de Bouchamma

27 January 2023	Aube d'El Guettar (4)	0–2	Espoir de Djerba (2)	El Guettar
13:30		Report		Stadium: Stade Municipal d'El Guettar

27 January 2023	LS Sidi Bouzid (4)	1–2 (a.e.t.)	Association Mégrine (4)	Sidi Bouzid
13:30		Report		Stadium: Ancien Stade de Sidi Bouzid

== Round of 32 ==
The draw for the round of 32 was held on 30 January 2023.

12 February 2023 Match 1	Stade Africain Menzel Bourguiba (3)	1–0	Espoir de Hammam Sousse (1)	Menzel Bourguiba
13:30	Chiibi 74'	Report		Stadium: Stade Azaiez Jaballah; Referee: Dorsaf Ganouati

12 February 2023 Match 3	Union de Bou Salem (3)	0–1	Stade Tunisien (1)	Bou Salem
13:30		Report	Aouadhi 24' (pen.)	Stadium: Stade Municipal de Bou Salem; Referee: Fredj Abdellaoui

12 February 2023 Match 4	Étoile du Sahel (1)	2–0	Avenir de Soliman (1)	Sousse
13:30	Abid 4'; Bongonga 56'	Report		Stadium: Stade Olympique de Sousse; Referee: Mehrez Melki

12 February 2023 Match 7	Croissant Chebbien (1)	1–1 (a.e.t.) (4–3 p)	Club de Hammam-Lif (2)	Kairouan
13:30	Sassi 58'	Report	Touati 42'	Stadium: Stade Ali Zouaoui; Referee: Walid Ouni

12 February 2023 Match 8	Jeunesse d'El Omrane (3)	1–1 (a.e.t.) (5–4 p)	Olympique Sidi Bouzid (1)	Tunis
13:30	Touati 115'	Report	Zaafouri 112'	Stadium: Complexe Tayeb Ben Ammar; Referee: Hamza Jaied

12 February 2023 Match 9	Palme de Tozeur (3)	1–2	El Gawafel de Gafsa (2)	Tozeur
13:30	Tahri 36'	Report	Bargougui 21' (pen.); Mbarek 39'	Stadium: Stade de Tozeur; Referee: Ali Mokhtar

12 February 2023 Match 10	Club Sfaxien (1)	2–0	Stade Sfaxien (2)	Sfax
13:30	Haboubi 35'; Trabelsi 75'	Report		Stadium: Stade Taïeb Mhiri; Referee: Khalil Trabelsi

12 February 2023 Match 11	Association Mégrine (4)	0–0 (a.e.t.) (2–4 p)	Club Bizertin (1)	Tunis
13:30		Report		Stadium: Stade Hammouda Haddad de Mégrine; Referee: Abdelhamid Badreddine

12 February 2023 Match 12	Gazelle de Bekalta (4)	0–1	Espoir de Bou Hajla (4)	Bekalta
13:30		Report	Ghdami 51'	Stadium: Stade de Bekalta; Referee: Sofiane Mansri

12 February 2023 Match 13	Avenir de Kasserine (3)	1–0	Étoile de Radès (2)	Kasserine
13:30	Ghrab 9'	Report		Stadium: Stade de Kasserine; Referee: Houssem Belhaj Ali

12 February 2023 Match 14	FC Hammamet (3)	1–1 (a.e.t.) (3–5 p)	Olympique Béja (1)	Hammamet
13:30	Ben Jaffala 67' (pen.)	Report	Bouguerra 88'	Stadium: Terrain De Football Bir Bou Regba; Referee: Nabil Hammadi

12 February 2023 Match 15	Union de Tataouine (1)	1–1 (a.e.t.) (1–3 p)	Étoile de Métlaoui (1)	Tataouine
13:30	Hadhri 72'	Report	Kabala 67'	Stadium: Stade Nejib Khattab; Referee: Nasrallah Jaouadi

12 February 2023 Match 5	Croissant de M'saken (2)	1–0	Avenir de Rejiche (1)	M'saken
14:00	Mednini 75' (pen.)	Report		Stadium: Stade du Rugby M'saken; Referee: Houssem Boulares

15 February 2023 Match 2	Union de Ben Guerdane (1)	1–0	Union Monastirienne (1)	Ben Guerdane
13:30	Zaidi 90+2'	Report		Stadium: Stade du 7 Mars; Referee: Oussama Razgallah

15 February 2023 Match 6	Espérance de Tunis (1)	2–1	Espoir de Djerba (2)	Tunis
13:30	Zaddem 13'; Mimouni 55'	Report	Filali 87'	Stadium: Stade Hammadi Agrebi; Referee: Karim Khemiri

16 February 2023 Match 16	Club Africain (1)	3–0	El Makarem de Mahdia (2)	Tunis
13:30	H. Labidi 5', 90+3'; Ouedherfi 90+1'	Report		Stadium: Stade Hammadi Agrebi; Referee: Khalil Jary

== Round of 16 ==
The draw for the round of 16 was held on 30 January 2023 (after the round of 32 draw).

19 February 2023 Match 17	Olympique Béja (1)	0–0 (a.e.t.) (4–3 p)	Avenir de Kasserine (3)	Béja
13:30		Report		Stadium: Stade Boujemaa Kmiti; Referee: Walid Mansri

19 February 2023 Match 18	Club Bizertin (1)	2–0	El Gawafel de Gafsa (2)	Bizerte
13:30	Balbouz 53'; Aloui 73'	Report		Stadium: Stade 15 Octobre; Referee: Haithem Kossai

19 February 2023 Match 19	Jeunesse d'El Omrane (3)	1–1 (a.e.t.) (0–3 p)	Club Sfaxien (1)	Tunis
13:30	Khalfaoui 3'	Report	Kachouri 81'	Stadium: Complexe Tayeb Ben Ammar; Referee: Achref Harakati

19 February 2023 Match 21	Club Africain (1)	4–0	Croissant M'saken (2)	Tunis
13:30	Dhaouadi 25'; Amri 45+2'; Ouedherfi 48'; H. Labidi 82'	Report		Stadium: Stade Hammadi Agrebi; Referee: Aymen Nasri

19 February 2023 Match 22	Stade Africain Menzel Bourguiba (3)	1–0	Espoir de Bou Hajla (4)	Menzel Bourguiba
13:30	Smichi 23'	Report		Stadium: Stade Azaiez Jaballah; Referee: Oussama Chraiet

19 February 2023 Match 23	Stade Tunisien (1)	1–1 (a.e.t.) (4–3 p)	Étoile du Sahel (1)	Korba
13:30	Jouini 59'	Report	Ben Hassine 18'	Stadium: Stade Municipal de Korba; Referee: Jalel Sahbani

19 February 2023 Match 24	Étoile de Métlaoui (1)	2–1 (a.e.t.)	Croissant Chebbien (1)	Métlaoui
13:30	Mastouri 15'; Mahmoudi 119'	Report	Bissemou 44'	Stadium: Stade Municipal de Métlaoui; Referee: Amir Ayadi

22 February 2023 Match 20	Espérance de Tunis (1)	4–0	Union de Ben Guerdane (1)	Tunis
13:30	Benayad 17'; Badri 28'; Elhouni 36'; Bouchniba 45+2'	Report		Stadium: Stade Hammadi Agrebi; Referee: Sadok Selmi

== Quarter-finals ==
The draw for the quarter-finals was held on 30 January 2023 (after the round of 32 and the round of 16 draws).

26 February 2023 Match 25	Stade Africain Menzel Bourguiba (3)	0–1	Club Africain (1)	Menzel Bourguiba
13:30		Report	H. Labidi 52'	Stadium: Stade Azaiez Jaballah; Referee: Oussama Ben Ishak

26 February 2023 Match 26	Club Sfaxien (1)	2–2 (a.e.t.) (2–4 p)	Olympique Béja (1)	Sfax
13:30	Ali 37'; Haboubi 50'	Report	Ba 59'; Chouikh 85'	Stadium: Stade Taïeb Mhiri; Referee: Amir Loussif

26 February 2023 Match 27	Stade Tunisien (1)	2–1	Étoile de Métlaoui (1)	Monastir
13:30	Khemissi 7'; Khadraoui 79'	Report	Mastouri 45'	Stadium: Stade Mustapha Ben Jannet; Referee: Haythem Guirat

5 April 2023 Match 28	Espérance de Tunis (1)	2–0	Club Bizertin (1)	Tunis
13:30	Ben Romdhane 33'; Ben Hammouda 78'	Report		Stadium: Stade Hammadi Agrebi; Referee: Naim Hosni

== Semi-finals ==
The draw for the semi-finals was held on 4 April 2023 as the identity of the 4th team was not known on the date of the draw.

12 April 2023
13:30

Club Africain	0–0 (a.e.t.)	Olympique Béja
	Report
Penalties
Dhaouadi (penalty scored); Ghandri (penalty scored); Sabo (penalty missed); Garreb (penalty missed); Khalifa (penalty missed)	2–3	(penalty scored) Bouguerra; (penalty scored) Ben Rajeh; (penalty missed) M. W. Derbali; (penalty scored) Agbozo

Stade Hammadi Agrebi, Tunis
Referee: Mohamed Marouf Eid Mansour (Egypt)

Olympique Béja qualified for the final.

13 April 2023
13:30

Espérance de Tunis	3–2	Stade Tunisien
Ben Romdhane 1'; Benayad 16'; Elhouni 27'	Report	Shili 13' (pen.), 44' (pen.)

Stade Hammadi Agrebi, Tunis
Referee: Lotfi Bekouassa (Algeria)

Espérance de Tunis qualified for the final.

== Final ==
The final was played on 28 May 2023 at Stade Hammadi Agrebi, Tunis.

28 May 2023
16:00

Espérance de Tunis	0–1	Olympique Béja
	Report	Bouguerra 66'

Stade Hammdi Agrebi, Tunis
Attendance: 30,000
Referee: Haythem Guirat

== See also ==
- 2022–23 Tunisian Ligue Professionnelle 1
- 2022–23 Tunisian Ligue Professionnelle 2
- 2022–23 Tunisian Super Cup
