= Mourad Okbi =

Tunisian football manager (born 1956)

Personal information
- Full name: Mourad Okbi
- Date of birth: 1 September 1965 (age 61)
- Place of birth: Kairouan, Tunisia
- Position: Defender

Senior career*
Years	Team	Apps	(Gls)
1985–1989	JS Kairouan		
1992–1994	Al-Ahli Club		

International career
1987–1995	Tunisia	50	(3)

Managerial career
- 2000–2002: ES Hammam-Sousse
- 2002–2004: Najran SC
- 2004–2005: Al-Shoulla F.C.
- 2005–2006: Al-Watani
- 2007: Abha Club
- 2007: JS Kairouan
- 2010: Najran SC
- 2010–2013: JS Kairouan
- 2013–2014: US Monastir
- 2014–2015: Stade Gabèsien
- 2015–2016: Al-Ittihad Kalba SC
- 2016–2017: Stade Gabèsien
- 2017–2019: Tunisia (assistant)
- 2018–2019: Stade Gabèsien
- 2019: JS Kairouan
- 2020: Al-Ansar
- 2021: Al-Nahda
- 2021: US Monastir
- 2023: Al-Sahel
- 2023: USM Khenchela
- 2023–2024: Olympique Beja
- 2024–2025: JS Saoura
- 2025: JS Kairouan
- 2025–2026: USM Khenchela
- * Club domestic league appearances and goals

Mourad Okbi (Arabic: مراد عقبي; born 1 September 1965) is a Tunisian retired footballer who played as a defender for the national team.

== Club career ==
He played in the Tunisian Ligue Professionnelle 1 with JS Kairouan and in Saudi Professional League with Al-Ahli Saudi FC.

== International career ==
He started playing with the national team in 1987, collecting 50 appearances in eight years and scored three goals. He also participated in the 1988 Summer Olympics in Seoul and the 1994 African Cup of Nations.

== Coaching career ==
He Started his career in 2000 with many Tunisian teams managing ES Hammam-Sousse, JS Kairouan, US Monastir and Stade Gabésien and Saudi teams with Najran SC, Al-Shoulla F.C., Al-Watani and Abha Club and also Emirati teams with Al-Ittihad Kalba SC. On 17 May 2017 he became the assistant of Nabil Maaloul in Tunisia and managed to qualify for the 2018 FIFA World Cup in Russia. After the departure of Nabil Maaloul, Okbi was retained with the new head coach Faouzi Benzarti.

In July 2021, Okbi was appointed as manager of US Monastir and he left the club on 4 October 2021 and was succeeded by Faouzi Benzarti.

On 17 March 2023, Okbi was appointed as manager of Al-Sahel.

19 August 2023, Okbi was appointed as manager of USM Khenchela. On 13 November 2023, Okbi left USM Khenchela.

On 24 November 2023, Okbi was appointed as manager of Olympique Beja.

On 17 November 2025, Okbi returned to USM Khenchela.

== Honours ==
Managerial honours :

=== US Monastir ===
- Tunisian Super Cup:
  - Winners : 2020

(due to COVID-19 the supercup was played in 2021)

=== Olympique Béja ===
- Tunisian Super Cup:
  - Winners : 2023
