= 2022–23 Tunisian Ligue Professionnelle 1 =

Tunisian Ligue Professionnelle 1
- Season: 2022–23
- Dates: 7 October 2022 – 30 June 2023
- Champions: Étoile du Sahel (11th title)
- Relegated: Olympique Sidi Bouzid; Espoir de Hammam Sousse; Croissant Chebbien; Avenir de Rejiche
- Champions League: Étoile du Sahel; Espérance de Tunis
- Confederation Cup: Club Africain; Olympique Béja
- Matches: 198
- Goals: 408 (2.06 per match)
- Top goalscorer: Rafik Kamergi (14 goals)
- Biggest home win: Union de Ben Guerdane 5–0 Union de Tataouine (11 June 2023); Étoile du Sahel 5–0 Olympique Béja (30 June 2023)
- Biggest away win: Espoir de Hammam Sousse 0–5 Étoile du Sahel (13 October 2022); Union de Tataouine 1–6 Espérance de Tunis (30 June 2023)
- Highest scoring: Olympique Sidi Bouzid 3–4 Étoile de Métlaoui (8 February 2023); Union de Tataouine 1–6 Espérance de Tunis (30 June 2023)
- Longest winning run: Olympique Béja (6 matches)
- Longest unbeaten run: Espérance de Tunis (13 matches)
- Longest winless run: Union de Tataouine (16 matches)
- Longest losing run: Avenir de Rejiche (8 matches)

The 2022–23 Tunisian Ligue Professionnelle 1 (Tunisian Professional League) season was the 68th season of top-tier football in Tunisia.

Étoile du Sahel were the champions for the first time since the 2015–16 Tunisian Ligue Professionnelle 1, ending Espérance de Tunis run of six consecutive titles.

Exceptionally, no match was played between 15 November and 10 December due to the 2022 FIFA World Cup, which was held in the same period in Qatar.

== Teams ==
A total of 16 teams contested the league.

=== Stadiums and locations ===
Locations of the 2022–23 Ligue 1 teams

Team	Location	Stadium	Capacity
Avenir de Rejiche	Rejiche	Stade Ahmed Khouaja	3,000
Avenir de Soliman	Soliman	Stade Municipal de Soliman	3,000
Club Africain	Tunis (Bab Jedid)	Stade Hammadi Agrebi	60,000
Club Bizertin	Bizerte	Stade 15 Octobre	20,000
Croissant Chebbien	Chebba	Stade de Chebba	3,000
Club Sfaxien	Sfax	Stade Taïeb Mhiri	22,000
Espoir de Hammam Sousse	Sousse (Hammam Sousse)	Stade Bou Ali Lahouar	6,500
Étoile de Métlaoui	Métlaoui	Stade Municipal de Métlaoui	6,000
Étoile du Sahel	Sousse	Stade Olympique de Sousse	42,000
Espérance de Tunis	Tunis (Bab Souika)	Stade Hammadi Agrebi	60,000
Olympique Béja	Béja	Stade Boujemaa Kmiti	15,000
Olympique Sidi Bouzid	Sidi Bouzid	Stade du 17 Décembre	1,000
Stade Tunisien	Tunis (Le Bardo)	Stade Hédi Enneifer	11,000
Union de Ben Guerdane	Ben Guerdane	Stade du 7 Mars	10,000
Union Monastirienne	Monastir	Stade Mustapha Ben Jannet	20,000
Union de Tataouine	Tataouine	Stade Nejib Khattab	5,000

=== Managerial changes ===
Team	Outgoing manager	Manner of departure	Date of vacancy	Incoming manager	Date of appointment
Union Monastirienne	(Tunisia) Faouzi Benzarti	Departure for (Libya) Al Ahly Benghazi	28 June 2022	(Serbia) Darko Novic	15 July 2022
Club Africain	(Tunisia) Adel Sellimi	Sacked	5 July 2022	(France) Bertrand Marchand	13 July 2022
Club Bizertin	(Tunisia) Karim Touati	Resignation	26 October 2022	(Tunisia) Sofiene Hidoussi	26 October 2022
Club Bizertin	(Tunisia) Sofiene Hidoussi	Resignation	28 October 2022	(Tunisia) Khaled Ben Yahia	4 November 2022
Croissant Chebbien	(Tunisia) Kais Yâakoubi	Resignation	2 November 2022	(Tunisia) Lotfi Rhim	3 November
Club Africain	(France) Bertrand Marchand	Resignation	8 November 2022	(Tunisia) Said Saibi	19 November 2022
Club Sfaxien	(Tunisia) Karim Dalhoum	Sacked	29 November 2022	(Italy) Maurizio Jacobacci	9 December 2022
Croissant Chebbien	(Tunisia) Lotfi Rhim	Resignation	14 December 2022	(Morocco) Badou Zaki	25 December 2022
Croissant Chebbien	(Morocco) Badou Zaki	Resignation	27 January 2023	(Tunisia) Skander Kasri	30 January 2023
Club Sfaxien	(Italy) Maurizio Jacobacci	Sacked	2 February 2023	(Tunisia) Anis Boujelbene (Interim)	2 February 2023
Club Bizertin	(Tunisia) Khaled Ben Yahia	Mutual consent	5 February 2023	(Tunisia) Sofiene Hidoussi	6 February 2023
Étoile du Sahel	(Tunisia) Mohamed Mkacher	Resignation	14 February 2023	(Tunisia) Faouzi Benzarti	28 February 2023
Olympique Béja	(Tunisia) Tarek Jarraya	Departure for (Libya) Al Ahly Tripoli	27 February 2023	(Tunisia) Jamel Khcharem	5 March 2023
Espérance de Tunis	(Tunisia) Nabil Maâloul	Resignation	13 May 2023	(Tunisia) Mouin Chaâbani	22 May 2023

== Competition ==
=== First round ===
==== Group A ====
===== Table =====
Pos	Team	Pld	W	D	L	GF	GA	GD	Pts	Qualification or relegation
1	Espérance de Tunis	14	9	4	1	25	8	+17	31	Advance to Playoff
2	Étoile du Sahel	14	9	2	3	23	11	+12	29	Advance to Playoff
3	Union de Tataouine	14	4	6	4	13	15	−2	18	Advance to Playoff
4	Club Sfaxien	14	3	7	4	9	10	−1	16 (Note: Teams ranked on goal difference: Club Sfaxien –1, Stade Tunisien −3, Club Bizertin −5)	Advance to Playoff
5	Stade Tunisien	14	4	4	6	14	17	−3	16	Qualification for Playout
6	Club Bizertin	14	4	4	6	12	17	−5	16	Qualification for Playout
7	Espoir de Hammam Sousse	14	3	5	6	9	18	−9	14	Qualification for Playout
8	Croissant Chebbien (R)	14	3	2	9	8	17	−9	11	Relegation to Ligue 2

Source: Tunisian Football Federation
Rules for classification: 1) points; 2) head-to-head points; 3) head-to-head goal difference; 4) goal difference; 5) total goals; 6) fairplay ranking; 7) playoff.
(R) Relegated

===== Results =====
Home \ Away	CAB	CSCH	CSS	ESHS	ESS	EST	ST	UST
Club Bizertin		2–0	0–0	2–2	1–2	0–1	1–2	1–1
Croissant Chebbien	3–0		2–0	0–1	0–0	0–2	1–0	0–1
Club Sfaxien	1–0	2–0		0–0	0–1	1–1	1–1	0–1
Espoir de Hammam Sousse	0–1	2–0	1–1		0–5	0–0	2–1	0–0
Étoile du Sahel	0–2	3–0	1–0	2–1		1–2	2–2	2–1
Espérance de Tunis	4–0	2–1	1–1	2–0	2–0		2–0	3–0
Stade Tunisien	0–1	1–1	0–1	2–0	0–2 (Note: Étoile du Sahel were awarded a 2–0 win after the match was stopped in the 70th minute, with the visitors leading 1–0, due to riots by the Stade Tunisien fans.)	2–1		2–1
Union de Tataouine	1–1	1–0	1–1	2–0	0–2	2–2	1–1	

Source: Tunisian Football Federation
Legend: Blue = home team win; Yellow = draw; Red = away team win.
For upcoming matches, an "a" indicates there is an article about the rivalry between the two participants.

===== Clubs season-progress =====
Team ╲ Round	1	2	3	4	5	6	7	8	9	10	11	12	13	14
Club Bizertin	L	D	D	L	L	W	L	W	D	W	D	L	L	W
Croissant Chebbien	W	L	L	D	L	L	W	L	L	L	W	L	D	L
Club Sfaxien	D	D	L	W	D	D	L	D	W	L	D	L	D	W
Espoir de Hammam Sousse	L	L	D	D	W	D	D	W	L	L	L	W	D	L
Étoile du Sahel	W	W	W	L	D	W	W	W	W	W	L	W	D	L
Espérance de Tunis	D	W	L	W	W	W	D	D	W	W	W	W	D	W
Stade Tunisien	W	D	W	D	D	L	D	L	L	L	L	L	W	W
Union de Tataouine	L	D	W	D	D	L	D	L	D	W	W	W	D	L

Source: Tunisian Football Federation
W = Win; D = Draw; L = Lose

==== Group B ====
===== Table =====
Pos	Team	Pld	W	D	L	GF	GA	GD	Pts	Qualification or relegation
1	Union Monastirienne	14	9	2	3	17	5	+12	29	Advance to Playoff
2	Union de Ben Guerdane	14	8	3	3	14	8	+6	27	Advance to Playoff
3	Olympique Béja	14	7	3	4	21	14	+7	24 (Note: Teams ranked on goal difference: Olympique Béja +7, Club Africain +3)	Advance to Playoff
4	Club Africain	14	7	3	4	16	13	+3	24	Advance to Playoff
5	Étoile de Métlaoui	14	5	4	5	14	17	−3	19	Qualification for Playout
6	Avenir de Soliman	14	4	5	5	11	14	−3	17	Qualification for Playout
7	Olympique Sidi Bouzid	14	2	3	9	9	19	−10	9	Qualification for Playout
8	Avenir de Rejiche (R)	14	1	3	10	5	17	−12	6	Relegation to Ligue 2

Source: Tunisian Football Federation
Rules for classification: 1) points; 2) head-to-head points; 3) head-to-head goal difference; 4) goal difference; 5) total goals; 6) fairplay ranking; 7) playoff.
(R) Relegated

===== Results =====
Home \ Away	ASR	ASS	CA	ESM	OB	OSB	USBG	USM
Avenir de Rejiche		0–0	1–1	0–0	1–4	0–1	1–0	0–2
Avenir de Soliman	1–0		0–1	1–1	1–0	1–0	1–0	0–2
Club Africain	1–0	1–0		2–0	1–2	3–0	0–1	1–3
Étoile de Métlaoui	3–2	0–0	0–0		1–0	1–0	2–1	1–2
Olympique Béja	1–0	3–2	2–3	3–1		2–2	1–1	0–0
Olympique Sidi Bouzid	1–0	2–2	0–1	3–4	0–2		0–1	0–0
Union de Ben Guerdane	1–0	2–2	1–1	2–0	1–0	1–0		1–0
Union Monastirienne	1–0	2–0	3–0	1–0	0–1	1–0	0–1	

Source: Tunisian Football Federation
Legend: Blue = home team win; Yellow = draw; Red = away team win.
For upcoming matches, an "a" indicates there is an article about the rivalry between the two participants.

===== Clubs season-progress =====
Team ╲ Round	1	2	3	4	5	6	7	8	9	10	11	12	13	14
Avenir de Rejiche	D	L	W	D	L	D	L	L	L	L	L	L	L	L
Avenir de Soliman	D	W	L	L	D	D	W	W	L	L	L	D	W	D
Club Africain	D	L	W	W	L	D	L	W	L	W	W	D	W	W
Étoile de Métlaoui	D	L	L	D	D	L	W	L	W	L	W	D	W	W
Olympique Béja	D	L	D	L	W	W	W	W	W	W	D	W	L	L
Olympique Sidi Bouzid	L	W	D	L	L	D	L	L	W	L	L	D	L	L
Union de Ben Guerdane	W	W	L	W	W	W	L	W	L	W	D	D	W	D
Union Monastirienne	D	W	W	W	W	L	W	L	W	W	W	D	L	W

Source: Tunisian Football Federation
W = Win; D = Draw; L = Lose

==== Goals scored per round ====
This graph represented the number of goals scored during each round:

=== Playoff ===
==== Table ====
Pos	Team	Pld	W	D	L	GF	GA	GD	Pts	Qualification
1	Étoile du Sahel (C)	14	9	4	1	19	3	+16	34 (Note: Étoile du Sahel and Union de Ben Guerdane were added 3 points (2nds of the groups in the first round).)	Qualification for the Champions League
2	Espérance de Tunis	14	7	3	4	20	10	+10	28 (Note: Espérance de Tunis and Union Monastirienne were added 4 points (1sts of the groups in the first round).)	Qualification for the Champions League
3	Club Africain	14	7	5	2	17	9	+8	27 (Note: Club Africain and Club Sfaxien were added 1 point (4ths of the groups in the first round).)	Qualification for the Confederation Cup
4	Union Monastirienne	14	6	4	4	23	14	+9	26	
5	Union de Ben Guerdane	14	5	3	6	18	16	+2	21	
6	Club Sfaxien	14	4	5	5	12	10	+2	18	
7	Olympique Béja	14	4	2	8	9	20	−11	16 (Note: Olympique Béja and Union de Tataouine were added 2 points (3rds of the groups in the first round).)	Qualification for the Confederation Cup (Note: As Tunisian Cup winners)
8	Union de Tataouine	14	0	2	12	6	42	−36	4	

Source: Tunisian Football Federation
Rules for classification: 1) points; 2) head-to-head points; 3) head-to-head goal difference; 4) goal difference; 5) total goals; 6) fairplay ranking; 7) playoff.
(C) Champions

==== Results ====
Home \ Away	CA	CSS	ESS	EST	OB	USBG	USM	UST
Club Africain		2–0	0–1	1–0	1–0	2–1	1–1	4–1
Club Sfaxien	0–0		1–1	1–0	0–0	1–0	0–0	4–0
Étoile du Sahel	2–0	1–0		0–0	5–0	2–0	2–1	3–0
Espérance de Tunis	0–0	1–0	1–0		2–0	2–0	1–1	3–0
Olympique Béja	0–2 (Note: Club Africain were awarded a 2–0 win after the match was stopped in first half, with a 0–0 draw, because of an attack by Olympique Béja fans on Said Saibi, the manager of Club Africain.)	2–0	0–0	2–0		0–1	1–3	2–0
Union de Ben Guerdane	1–1	2–0 (Note: Union de Ben Guerdane were awarded a 2–0 win after Club Sfaxien involved 5 foreign players on the pitch at the same time. The match originally ended 2–1 for Club Sfaxien.)	0–0	1–2	2–0		3–2	5–0
Union Monastirienne	0–1	1–1	0–1	3–2	3–0	3–1		1–0
Union de Tataouine	2–2	0–4	0–1	1–6	1–2	1–1	0–4	

Source: Tunisian Football Federation
Legend: Blue = home team win; Yellow = draw; Red = away team win.
For upcoming matches, an "a" indicates there is an article about the rivalry between the two participants.

==== Clubs season-progress ====
Team ╲ Round	1	2	3	4	5	6	7	8	9	10	11	12	13	14
Club Africain	W	D	W	W	L	W	D	W	W	D	D	L	D	W
Club Sfaxien	L	D	L	D	W	W	D	D	L	W	L	L	W	D
Étoile du Sahel	W	W	W	L	W	W	D	D	W	W	D	W	D	W
Espérance de Tunis	W	D	L	W	L	L	W	W	L	W	D	W	D	W
Olympique Béja	L	L	W	D	W	L	D	L	L	L	W	W	L	L
Union de Ben Guerdane	L	W	W	D	W	L	D	L	W	L	W	L	D	L
Union Monastirienne	W	D	L	L	L	W	D	W	W	L	D	W	W	D
Union de Tataouine	L	L	L	D	L	L	L	L	L	D	L	L	L	L

Source: Tunisian Football Federation
W = Win; D = Draw; L = Lose

==== Positions by round ====
Team ╲ Round	1	2	3	4	5	6	7	8	9	10	11	12	13	14
Club Africain	4	5	3	2	3	2	2	2	2	2	2	3	4	3
Club Sfaxien	8	6	7	7	7	6	6	6	6	6	6	7	6	6
Étoile du Sahel	3	1	1	1	1	1	1	1	1	1	1	1	1	1
Espérance de Tunis	1	2	5	3	4	5	3	3	4	3	3	2	3	2
Olympique Béja	6	7	6	6	5	7	7	7	7	7	7	6	7	7
Union de Ben Guerdane	5	4	2	4	2	3	4	5	5	5	4	5	5	5
Union Monastirienne	2	3	4	5	6	4	5	4	3	4	5	4	2	4
Union de Tataouine	7	8	8	8	8	8	8	8	8	8	8	8	8	8

Leader
2023–24 CAF Champions League
2023–24 CAF Confederation Cup

Source: Tunisian Football Federation

==== Goals scored per round ====
This graph represented the number of goals scored during each round:

=== Playout ===
==== Table ====
Pos	Team	Pld	W	D	L	GF	GA	GD	Pts	Relegation
1	Stade Tunisien	10	5	3	2	13	7	+6	22 (Note: Étoile de Métlaoui and Stade Tunisien were added 4 points (5ths of the groups in the first round).)	
2	Club Bizertin	10	5	2	3	12	5	+7	19 (Note: Avenir de Soliman and Club Bizertin were added 2 points (6ths of the groups in the first round).)	
3	Avenir de Soliman	10	4	2	4	8	12	−4	16	
4	Étoile de Métlaoui	10	2	4	4	7	13	−6	14	
5	Olympique Sidi Bouzid (R)	10	3	3	4	12	12	0	12	Relegation to Ligue 2
6	Espoir de Hammam Sousse (R)	10	3	2	5	12	15	−3	11	Relegation to Ligue 2

Source: Tunisian Football Federation
Rules for classification: 1) points; 2) head-to-head points; 3) head-to-head goal difference; 4) goal difference; 5) total goals; 6) fairplay ranking; 7) playoff.
(R) Relegated

==== Results ====
Home \ Away	ASS	CAB	ESHS	ESM	OSB	ST
Avenir de Soliman		0–1	1–0	2–0	1–2	0–3
Club Bizertin	0–1		2–2	3–0	3–0	0–0
Espoir de Hammam Sousse	5–1	1–0		0–0	0–2	1–2
Étoile de Métlaoui	0–0	0–2 (Note: Club Bizertin were awarded a 2–0 win after Étoile de Métlaoui involved 5 foreign players on the pitch at the same time. The match originally ended 0–0.)	1–2		2–1	2–1
Olympique Sidi Bouzid	1–1	0–1	4–0	1–1		1–1
Stade Tunisien	0–1	1–0	2–1	1–1	2–0	

Source: Tunisian Football Federation
Legend: Blue = home team win; Yellow = draw; Red = away team win.
For upcoming matches, an "a" indicates there is an article about the rivalry between the two participants.

==== Clubs season-progress ====
Team ╲ Round	1	2	3	4	5	6	7	8	9	10
Avenir de Soliman	L	D	L	L	D	W	W	W	W	L
Club Bizertin	W	L	W	W	D	W	D	W	L	L
Espoir de Hammam Sousse	D	L	W	L	D	W	L	L	L	W
Étoile de Métlaoui	D	D	L	W	D	L	L	L	D	W
Olympique Sidi Bouzid	L	W	D	L	D	L	W	L	D	W
Stade Tunisien	W	W	D	W	D	L	D	W	W	L

Source: Tunisian Football Federation
W = Win; D = Draw; L = Lose

== Season statistics ==
=== Top scorers ===
Rank	Goalscorer	Club	Goals
1	(Tunisia) Rafik Kamergi	USBG	14
2	(Tunisia) Oussama Bouguerra	OB	10
2	(Tunisia) Haythem Jouini	ST	10
2	(Tunisia) Anice Badri	EST	10
5	(Tunisia) Mohamed Ali Ben Romdhane	EST	9
5	(Niger) Youssouf Oumarou	USM	9
5	(Tunisia) Oussama Abid	ESS	9
8	(Tunisia) Hamdi Labidi	CA	8
8	(Tunisia) Haykeul Chikhaoui	USM	8
8	(Tunisia) Achref Habbassi	CSS	8
11	(Republic of the Congo) Mouala Chance	ESM	6
11	(Nigeria) David Akpan Ankeye	ESHS	6
11	(Senegal) Bernard Babacar Faye	ASS	6
11	(Tunisia) Amine Haboubi	OB then CSS	6

=== Final ranking ===
Rank	Team	Pld	W	D	L	GF	GA	GD	Pts
1	Étoile du Sahel (C)	28	18	6	4	42	14	+28	60
2	Espérance de Tunis	28	16	7	5	45	18	+27	55
3	Club Africain	28	14	8	6	33	22	+11	50
4	Union Monastirienne	28	15	6	7	40	19	+21	51
5	Union de Ben Guerdane	28	13	6	9	32	24	+8	45
6	Club Sfaxien	28	7	12	9	21	20	+1	33
7	Olympique Béja	28	11	5	12	30	34	–4	38
8	Union de Tataouine	28	4	8	16	19	57	–39	20
9	Stade Tunisien	24	9	7	8	27	24	+3	34
10	Club Bizertin	24	9	6	9	24	22	+2	33
11	Avenir de Soliman	24	8	7	9	19	26	−7	31
12	Étoile de Métlaoui	24	7	8	9	21	30	−9	29
13	Olympique Sidi Bouzid (R)	24	5	6	13	21	31	−10	21
14	Espoir de Hammam Sousse (R)	24	6	7	11	21	33	−12	25
15	Croissant Chebbien (R)	14	3	2	9	8	17	−9	11
16	Avenir de Rejiche (R)	14	1	3	10	5	17	−12	6

=== Hat-tricks ===
Player	For	Against	Result	Date
(Tunisia) Anice Badri	Espérence de Tunis	Club Bizertin	4–0 (H)	2 February 2023
(Tunisia) Yassine Meriah	Espérence de Tunis	Union de Tataouine	6–1 (A)	30 June 2023

=== Scoring ===
- First goal of the season:
  (Tunisia) Rafik Kamergi for Union de Ben Guerdane against Olympique Sidi Bouzid (7 October 2022)
- Final goal of the season:
  (Tunisia) Mahdi Ouedherfi for Club Africain against Union de Ben Guerdane (30 June 2023)

== Number of teams by Governorate ==
Position	Governorate	Number	Teams
1	Tunis	3	Club Africain, Espérance de Tunis, Stade Tunisien
2	Sousse	2	Espoir de Hammam Sousse, Étoile du Sahel
2	Mahdia	2	Avenir de Rejiche, Croissant Chebbien
4	Sfax	1	Club Sfaxien
4	Nabeul	1	Avenir de Soliman
4	Bizerte	1	Club Bizertin
4	Monastir	1	Union Monastirienne
4	Medenine	1	Union de Ben Guerdane
4	Sidi Bouzid	1	Olympique Sidi Bouzid
4	Béja	1	Olympique Béja
4	Tataouine	1	Union de Tataouine
4	Gafsa	1	Étoile de Métlaoui

== Awards ==
Each month, Internet users voted for the player of the month sponsored by Foot24 and Coca-Cola.

Month	Player of the Month	
Month	Player	Club
February	(Tunisia) Hamdi Labidi	Club Africain
March	(Tunisia) Oussama Abid	Étoile du Sahel
April	(Tunisia) Mohamed Ali Amri	Club Africain
May	(Tunisia) Hamdi Labidi	Club Africain
June	(Tunisia) Zied Boughattas	Étoile du Sahel

== Media coverage ==
Tunisian Ligue Professionnelle 1 Media Coverage
Television Channel	Internet
(Qatar) Al-Kass Sports Channel	(Tunisia) Diwan FM

== See also ==
- 2022–23 Tunisian Cup
- 2023 Tunisian Super Cup
