= Mohamed Guizani =

Tunisian football manager

Personal information
- Full name: Mohamed Ali Guizani
- Date of birth: 25 November 1975 (age 50)
- Position: Centre-back

Team information
- Current team: US Tataouine (assistant)

Senior career*
Years	Team	Apps	(Gls)
1995–2000	Stade Tunisien		
2000–2002	CA Bizertin		
2002–2006	Espérance		
2006	→ EOG Kram (loan)		
2006–2007	CS Hammam-Lif		
2007–2008	AS Kasserine		
2008	EGS Gafsa		
2008–2009	JS Soukra		
2009–2010	SC Ben Arous		

Managerial career
- 2019: Olympique Béja
- 2021–: US Tataouine (assistant)
- * Club domestic league appearances and goals

Manager club 3 etoile sportive de Sahel (Assistance equipe b )

Mohamed Ali Guizani (born 25 November 1975) is a Tunisian football manager and former player.
