= Mouin Chaâbani =

Tunisian footballer and manager

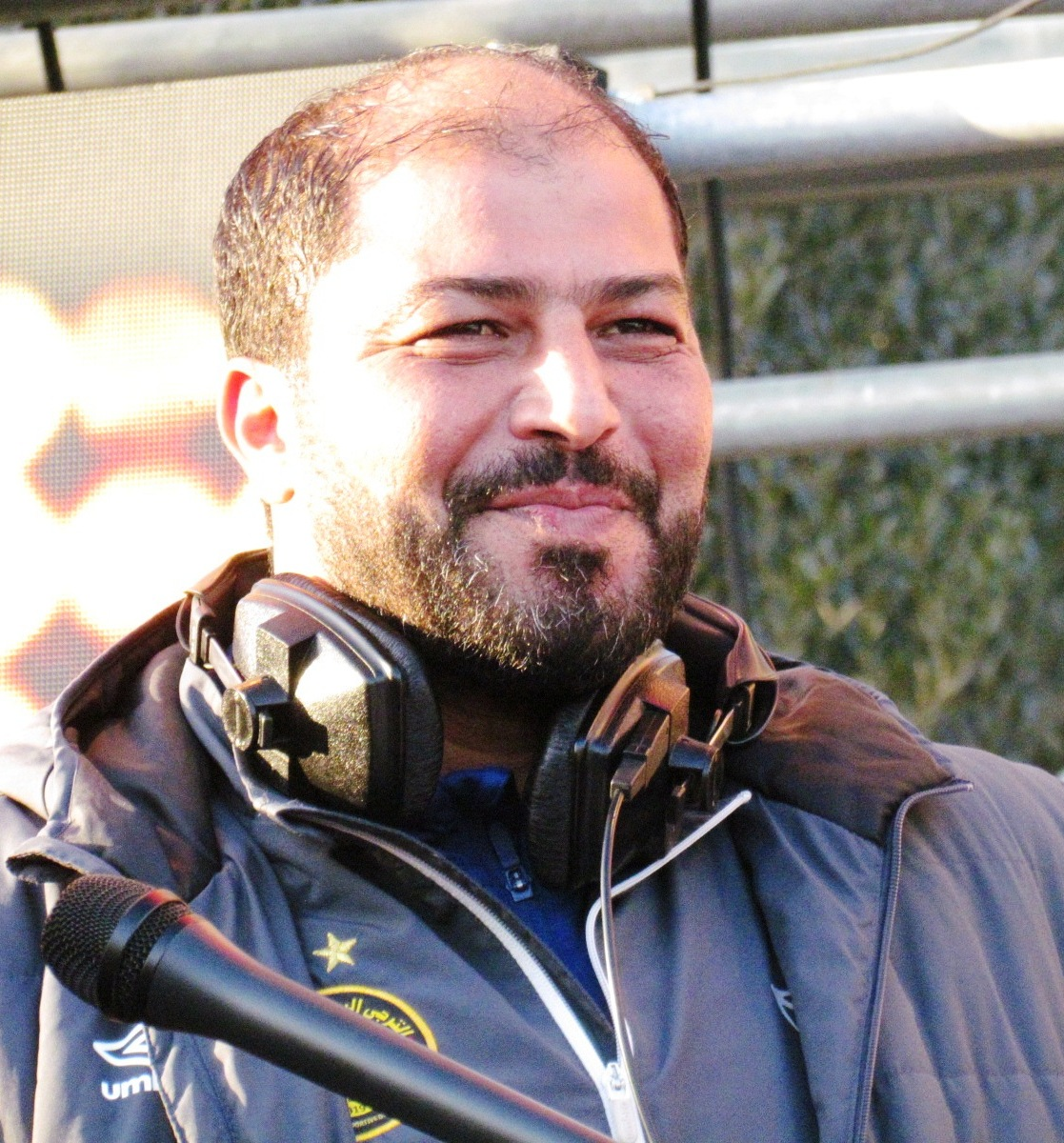
- Chaâbani in 2019

Personal information
- Full name: Mouin Chaâbani
- Date of birth: 18 June 1981 (age 45)
- Place of birth: Béja, Tunisia
- Height: 1.93 m (6 ft 4 in)
- Position: Defender

Team information
- Current team: Tunisia (head coach)

Senior career*
| Years | Team | Apps | (Gls) |
| 1999–2008 | Espérance de Tunis | 31 | (7) |
| 2008–2009 | Ankaragücü | 10 | (2) |
| 2009–2010 | Club de Hammam-Lif | 14 | (4) |
| 2010–2011 | Al-Qadisiyah FC | 19 | (5) |
| 2011–2014 | Club de Hammam-Lif | 60 | (13) |

International career
| 2002 | Tunisia | 1 | (0) |

Managerial career
- 2015-2016: CS Hammam-Lif
- 2018–2021: Espérance de Tunis
- 2021–2022: Al Masry
- 2023: Ceramica Cleopatra
- 2023: Espérance de Tunis
- 2024–2026: RS Berkane
- 2026–: Tunisia
- * Club domestic league appearances and goals

Mouin Chaâbani (Arabic: معين الشعباني; born 18 June 1981) is a Tunisian professional football manager and former player who is the manager of the Tunisia national team.

== Managerial career ==
Chaâbani led Espérance de Tunis to two CAF Champions League titles in 2018 and 2019. He later went to Egypt to coach Al Masry in 2021–22, then Ceramica Cleopatra in 2023. He made history with RS Berkane in the 2024–25 Botola Pro season helping them win the League title for the first time in their history, as well as securing the 2024–25 CAF Confederation Cup title.

On 28 July 2026, Chaâbani was appointed as the head coach of the Tunisia national team.

== Managerial statistics ==
As of 1 June 2025

Managerial record by team and tenure
| Team | Nat | From | To | Record | | | | | | | |
| Team | Nat | From | To | G | W | D | L | GF | GA | GD | Win % |
|---|---|---|---|---|---|---|---|---|---|---|---|
| CS Hammam-Lif | (Tunisia) | 10 March 2015 | 30 June 2016 | 44 | 15 | 10 | 19 | 43 | 52 | −9 | 34.09 |
| Esperance de Tunis | (Tunisia) | 23 October 2018 | 22 July 2021 | 132 | 86 | 25 | 21 | 190 | 98 | +92 | 65.15 |
| Al Masry SC | (Egypt) | 12 September 2021 | 29 May 2022 | 33 | 10 | 10 | 13 | 39 | 46 | −7 | 30.30 |
| Ceramica Cleopatra FC | (Egypt) | 26 January 2023 | 22 May 2023 | 12 | 2 | 8 | 2 | 17 | 10 | +7 | 16.67 |
| Esperance de Tunis | (Tunisia) | 23 May 2023 | 2 October 2023 | 14 | 8 | 4 | 2 | 24 | 10 | +14 | 57.14 |
| RS Berkane | (Morocco) | 12 February 2024 | 17 July 2026 | 120 | 71 | 28 | 21 | 108 | 35 | +73 | 59.17 |
| Tunisia | (Tunisia) | 28 July 2026 | Present | 2 | 0 | 2 | 0 | 3 | 3 | +0 | 0.00 |
| Career Total | | | | 302 | 166 | 70 | 66 | 421 | 223 | +198 | 54.97 |

== Honours ==
=== Player ===
Espérance de Tunis

- Tunisian Ligue Professionnelle 1: 1999–2000, 2000–01, 2001–02, 2002–03, 2003–04, 2005–06
- Tunisian Cup: 2005–06, 2006–07, 2007–08
- Tunisian Super Cup: 2001

=== Manager ===
Espérance de Tunis

- Tunisian Ligue Professionnelle 1: 2018–19, 2019–20, 2020–21
- Tunisian Super Cup: 2017–18, 2018–19
- CAF Champions League: 2018, 2018–19

RS Berkane

- Botola Pro: 2024–25
- CAF Confederation Cup: 2024–25

Individual

- Botola Pro Manager of the Year: 2024–25
