= 1975–76 Libyan Premier League =

Libyan Premier League
- Season: 1975–76

The 1975–76 Libyan Premier League was the 12th edition of the competition since its inception in 1963. Unlike previous competitions, it brought together the best teams at regional level. The competing teams were:

- Al Madina (Western Champions)
- Ahly Benghazi (Eastern Champions)
- Qurthabia (Southern Champions)

== Classification ==
| Pos | Team | Pld | W | D | L | GF | GA | GD | Pts |
|---|---|---|---|---|---|---|---|---|---|
| 1 | Al Madina | 4 | 2 | 2 | 0 | 10 | 3 | +7 | 6 |
| 2 | Al Ahly | 4 | 1 | 2 | 1 | 3 | 3 | 0 | 4 |
| 3 | Al Qurthabia | 4 | 0 | 2 | 2 | 3 | 10 | −7 | 2 |
