= Reinaldo Aleluia =

Brazilian footballer (1973–2026)

Personal information
- Full name: Reinaldo de Aleluia Silva
- Date of birth: 31 January 1973
- Place of birth: Salvador, Bahia, Brazil
- Date of death: 5 March 2026 (aged 53)
- Place of death: Salvador, Bahia, Brazil
- Height: 1.81 m (5 ft 11 in)
- Position: Forward

Senior career*
Years	Team	Apps	(Gls)
1994–1996	Bahia		
1997	América-MG		
1998	Social		
1998	União São João		
1998	Etti Jundiaí		
1999	Vila Nova		
2000	ABC		
2000	União São João		
2000–2002	Espérance		
2003	América-RN		
2003	ABC		
2004	Ceará		
2004	Juventude		
2004	ABC		
2005	Ceará		
2005	Brasiliense		
2005	Sport Recife		
2006–2007	Ceará		
2007	Brasiliense		
2008	Bahia		
2008	Remo		
2009	Guarany de Sobral		
2010	Madre de Deus		
2010	Confiança		
- * Club domestic league appearances and goals

Reinaldo de Aleluia Silva (31 January 1973 – 5 March 2026) was a Brazilian professional footballer who played as a forward.

== Career ==
Reinaldo Aleluia played for several teams, especially in the northeast region, but stood out especially in Ceará, where he was a hero in winning the 2006 Campeonato Cearense.

== Death ==
Aleluia died in Salvador on 5 March 2026, due to a cardiorespiratory arrest complicated by kidney disease. He was 53.

== Honours ==
ABC

- Campeonato Potiguar: 2000

Espérance

- Tunisian Ligue Professionnelle 1: 2001–02

Ceará

- Campeonato Cearense: 2006
