= 1982–83 Libyan Premier League =

Libyan Premier League
- Season: 1982–83

The 1982–83 Libyan Premier League was the 16th edition of the competition since its inception in 1963.

== Overview ==
It was contested by 16 teams, and Al Madina Tripoli won the championship.

== Group stage ==
=== Group A ===
Pos	Team	Pld	W	D	L	GF	GA	GD	Pts
1	Al Madina Tripoli	14	11	2	1	24	8	+16	24
2	Al-Ahly (Benghazi)	14	10	2	2	20	6	+14	22
3	Al-Ittihad (Tripoli)	14	8	3	3	21	5	+16	19
4	Al Tahaddy Benghazi	14	7	2	5	22	11	+11	16
5	Al-Africy	14	4	2	8	10	13	−3	10
6	Al-Shabab Al-Arabe	13	3	4	6	9	14	−5	10
7	Al-Bashaer	13	2	1	10	9	27	−18	5
8	Al Charara	14	1	2	11	5	36	−31	4

=== Group B ===
Pos	Team	Pld	W	D	L	GF	GA	GD	Pts
1	Al-Ahly (Tripoli)	14	12	2	0	35	9	+26	26
2	Al-Nasr (Benghazi)	14	7	5	2	27	13	+14	19
3	Al-Wahda	14	7	5	2	15	11	+4	19
4	Al-Dhahra	14	4	7	3	15	10	+5	15
5	Al-Hilal (Benghazi)	14	3	6	5	14	17	−3	12
6	Al-Swihli (Misurata)	14	3	4	7	13	25	−12	10
7	Darnes Darnah	14	1	7	6	10	19	−9	9
8	Al-Kudos	14	0	2	12	7	32	−25	2

== Playoff ==
=== Semifinal ===
- Al-Ahly (Tripoli) 3-1 ; 1-1 Al-Ahly (Benghazi)
- Al-Nasr (Benghazi) 1-1 ; 0-1 Al Madina Tripoli

=== Final ===
- Al Madina Tripoli 2-1 Al-Ahly (Tripoli)
