= 2005–06 Tunisian Ligue Professionnelle 1 =

Tunisian Ligue Professionnelle 1
- Season: 2005–06
- Champions: Espérance de Tunis
- Relegated: Jendouba Sport, JS Kairouan
- Champions League: Espérance de Tunis, Etoile du Sahel
- Confederation Cup: CS Sfaxien, EGS Gafsa
- Matches: 182
- Goals: 356 (1.96 per match)
- Top goalscorer: Amine Ltaïef (16 goals)
- Biggest home win: CSS 5–0 CSHL
- Biggest away win: EOGK 0–5 CSS
- Highest scoring: CA 5–1 CSHL; CSS 5–1 EGSG; CSHL 3–3 CA; EST 4–2 JSK; JSK 3–3 CSHL

The 2005–06 Tunisian Ligue Professionnelle 1 season was the 51st season of top-tier football in Tunisia.

== Teams ==
- AS Marsa
- Club Africain
- CA Bizertin
- CS Hammam-Lif
- CS Sfaxien
- EGS Gafsa
- Espérance de Tunis
- ES Zarzis
- EO Goulette et Kram
- Etoile du Sahel
- Jendouba Sport
- JS Kairouan
- Stade Tunisien
- US Monastir

== Results ==
=== League table ===
Pos	Team	Pld	W	D	L	GF	GA	GD	Pts	Qualification or relegation
1	Espérance de Tunis	26	17	5	4	42	21	+21	56	Qualification to the 2007 CAF Champions League
2	Étoile du Sahel	26	16	7	3	30	11	+19	55	Qualification to the 2007 CAF Champions League
3	Club Africain	26	12	11	3	37	19	+18	47	
4	CS Sfaxien	26	12	9	5	35	16	+19	45	Qualification to the 2007 CAF Confederation Cup
5	US Monastir	26	11	8	7	22	20	+2	41	
6	ES Zarzis	26	7	9	10	20	26	−6	30	
7	Stade Tunisien	26	7	8	11	24	25	−1	29	
8	EGS Gafsa	26	6	11	9	28	36	−8	29	Qualification to the 2007 CAF Confederation Cup
9	AS Marsa	26	6	10	10	19	30	−11	28	
10	CS Hammam-Lif	26	7	7	12	28	41	−13	28	
11	CA Bizertin	26	4	13	9	15	23	−8	25	
12	EO Goulette et Kram	26	5	10	11	16	30	−14	25	
13	Jendouba Sport	26	5	9	12	16	22	−6	24	Relegation to the Tunisian Ligue Professionnelle 2
14	JS Kairouan	26	5	7	14	24	36	−12	22	Relegation to the Tunisian Ligue Professionnelle 2

Updated to match(es) played on 16 April 2006. Source: Ligue 1
Rules for classification: 1) points; 2) goal difference; 3) number of goals scored.

=== Result table ===
Home \ Away	ASM	CA	CAB	CSHL	CSS	EGSG	EST	ESZ	EOGK	ESS	JS	JSK	ST	USM
AS Marsa	—	1–1	1–1	1–1	0–0	1–1	1–2	1–0	1–0	0–0	2–1	1–0	0–0	1–1
Club Africain	1–0	—	4–0	5–1	2–0	0–0	1–2	1–0	1–1	1–0	1–1	1–0	1–1	3–0
CA Bizertin	3–1	1–2	—	0–0	0–1	0–0	0–2	1–1	2–1	0–1	0–0	1–1	1–0	2–0
CS Hammam-Lif	0–0	3–3	2–0	—	0–1	2–1	1–2	1–0	3–1	0–1	1–0	1–1	3–2	0–1
CS Sfaxien	2–0	0–0	0–0	5–0	—	5–1	1–2	4–1	0–0	0–0	1–0	2–0	0–1	1–0
EGS Gafsa	2–1	0–0	2–2	2–1	1–1	—	1–1	2–3	2–0	1–0	2–0	2–2	2–3	1–1
ES Tunis	2–0	2–0	0–0	4–1	3–1	3–2	—	1–1	3–0	1–2	1–0	4–2	0–0	2–1
ES Zarzis	2–0	1–2	1–0	1–0	2–2	0–1	0–0	—	2–0	0–0	1–0	0–1	1–1	0–1
EO Goulette et Kram	1–2	0–2	0–0	1–0	0–5	1–1	0–1	0–1	—	0–0	1–1	2–0	1–0	1–1
Étoile du Sahel	2–1	1–0	1–0	2–0	2–0	2–0	2–1	2–0	1–1	—	1–1	3–1	1–0	2–1
Jendouba Sport	1–2	1–1	1–0	1–2	1–1	2–0	2–0	0–0	0–0	0–0	—	0–1	1–2	0–1
JS Kairouan	3–0	2–3	1–1	3–3	0–1	1–1	0–1	1–1	0–2	0–1	0–1	—	1–0	3–2
Stade Tunisien	1–1	1–1	0–0	1–1	0–1	2–0	0–1	4–1	1–2	1–3	0–1	1–0	—	2–0
US Monastir	2–0	0–0	0–0	2–1	0–0	2–0	2–1	0–0	0–0	1–0	1–0	1–0	1–0	—

Updated to match(es) played on April 16, 2006. Source: Ligue 1
Legend: Blue = home team win; Yellow = draw; Red = away team win.
