= Al-Madina SC =

Libyan football club

Al-Madina
- Full name: Al-Madina Sports Club
- Nicknames: Bianco Nero; The Black Castle; The Corsairs; The Fishermen
- Founded: 1953
- Ground: GMR Stadium
- Capacity: 8,000
- Chairman: AbdulSalam AlJahani
- Manager: Alejandro Menéndez
- League: Libyan Premier League
- 2025–26: Libyan Premier League – Western Group, 4th of 6
- Website: almadinasc.ly

Al-Madina Sports Club (Arabic: نادي المدينة الرياضي) is a Libyan professional football club based in Tripoli. The club competes in the Libyan Premier League. It is the only Libyan club that have never been relegated to a lower division.

== Honours ==
- Libyan Premier League: 3

1975–76, 1982–83, 2000–01

- Libyan Cup: 2

1977, 1990

- Libyan Super Cup: 1

2001

- Champion of Tripoli Province: 3

1959, 1960, 1976

== Performance in CAF competitions ==
- CAF Champions League: 1

2002: Second Round

- African Cup of Champions Clubs: 2

1977: Second Round
1984: First Round

- CAF Cup Winners' Cup: 3

1978: First Round
1988: Withdrew in First Round
1991: Second Round

== Current squad ==
Note: Flags indicate national team as defined under FIFA eligibility rules; some limited exceptions apply. Players may hold more than one non-FIFA nationality.

No.	Pos.	Nation	Player
1	GK	LBY	Mohammed Al-Forgany
2	DF	LBY	Emad Al-Sweri
3	DF	PLE	Camilo Saldaña
4	DF	LBY	Maab Adel Shukri
5	MF	PLE	Tajeldin Elnour
6	DF	LBY	Ahmed Al-Harati
7	MF	LBY	Muayid Al-Gritly
8	MF	LBY	Muhannad Etoo
9	FW	SEN	Alassane Diao
10	FW	COD	Chadrack Lukombe
11	FW	TUN	Mohamed Ali Amri
12	GK	LBY	Mohammed Al-Shaawani
13	DF	LBY	Idrees Abdulnasir Al-Dharrat

No.	Pos.	Nation	Player
14	DF	LBY	Naji Daraa
16	MF	LBY	Mohammed Al-Bargeli
17	FW	LBY	Ali Osamah
18	MF	ETH	Kenean Markneh
21	FW	LBY	Amjed Al-Gsheim
23	MF	NIG	Yussif Moussa
24	MF	ZAM	Kelvin Kampamba
25	MF	LBY	Mohamed Fazzani
26	GK	LBY	Khaled Bayouk
28	DF	TUN	Sadok Touj
30	DF	SDN	Ather El Tahir
—	FW	EQG	Loren Zúñiga
