= 2006–07 Tunisian Ligue Professionnelle 1 =

Tunisian Ligue Professionnelle 1
- Season: 2006–07
- Dates: 19 August 2006 – 27 May 2007
- Champions: Etoile du Sahel
- Relegated: EO Goulette et Kram, ES Hammam-Sousse
- Champions League: Etoile du Sahel, Club Africain
- Confederation Cup: Espérance de Tunis, CS Sfaxien
- Matches: 182
- Goals: 387 (2.13 per match)
- Top goalscorer: Tarek Ziadi (13 goals)
- Biggest home win: ESS 5–0 CSS
- Biggest away win: ESHS 0–4 ESS
- Highest scoring: USM 4–4 CA

The 2006–07 Tunisian Ligue Professionnelle 1 was the 52nd season of top-tier football in Tunisia. It saw Étoile du Sahel win the championship. At the other end of the table, Etoile Olympique de la Goulette et Kram and ES Hammam-Sousse were relegated to Ligue Professionnelle 2.

== Teams and locations ==
- AS Marsa
- Club Africain
- CA Bizertin
- CS Hammam-Lif
- CS Sfaxien
- EGS Gafsa
- Espérance de Tunis
- ES Zarzis
- ES Hammam-Sousse
- EO Goulette et Kram
- Étoile du Sahel
- Olympique Béja
- Stade Tunisien
- US Monastir
Locations of teams in the 2007–08 Tunisian Ligue Professionnelle 1

== Results ==
=== League table ===
Pos	Team	Pld	W	D	L	GF	GA	GD	Pts	Qualification or relegation
1	Étoile du Sahel	26	15	8	3	43	18	+25	53	Qualification to the 2008 CAF Champions League
2	Club Africain	26	13	10	3	38	22	+16	49	Qualification to the 2008 CAF Champions League
3	Espérance de Tunis	26	13	10	3	40	26	+14	49	Qualification to the 2008 CAF Confederation Cup
4	US Monastir	26	13	8	5	34	24	+10	47	Qualification to the 2007–08 Arab Champions League
5	CS Sfaxien	26	10	8	8	37	28	+9	38	Qualification to the 2008 CAF Confederation Cup
6	Stade Tunisien	26	8	8	10	25	26	−1	32	
7	EGS Gafsa	26	6	12	8	25	32	−7	30	
8	Olympique Béja	26	7	9	10	24	35	−11	30	
9	CS Hammam-Lif	26	6	11	9	22	26	−4	29	
10	AS Marsa	26	7	6	13	22	34	−12	27	
11	ES Zarzis	26	6	8	12	20	25	−5	26	
12	CA Bizertin	26	5	10	11	28	38	−10	25	Qualification to the 2007–08 Arab Champions League
13	EO Goulette et Kram	26	5	9	12	15	27	−12	24	Relegation to the Tunisian Ligue Professionnelle 2
14	ES Hammam-Sousse	26	4	11	11	14	26	−12	23	Relegation to the Tunisian Ligue Professionnelle 2

Updated to match(es) played on 27 May 2007. Source: Ligue 1
Rules for classification: 1) points; 2) goal difference; 3) number of goals scored.

=== Result table ===
Home \ Away	ASM	CA	CAB	CSHL	CSS	EGSG	EST	ESZ	ESHS	EOGK	ESS	OB	ST	USM
AS Marsa	—	0–0	2–1	0–1	0–3	1–0	0–2	2–0	0–0	0–1	0–1	1–1	3–1	0–1
Club Africain	4–2	—	1–1	0–2	2–1	2–0	1–0	1–0	1–0	2–0	1–0	4–1	0–0	3–0
CA Bizertin	3–1	0–2	—	2–0	1–0	1–1	1–1	1–1	1–1	1–2	0–0	4–2	0–1	1–2
CS Hammam-Lif	0–0	0–0	2–2	—	1–2	1–2	1–1	1–1	1–0	2–2	1–1	0–0	0–0	2–0
CS Sfaxien	2–1	1–2	4–0	2–1	—	2–2	0–0	3–0	2–1	4–0	1–2	4–1	1–0	1–1
EGS Gafsa	2–2	2–2	2–1	0–0	1–1	—	2–2	0–2	1–1	1–0	1–2	2–1	2–1	0–1
ES Tunis	3–1	1–1	4–1	3–1	2–1	1–1	—	2–1	2–0	2–1	1–0	0–0	2–1	1–3
ES Zarzis	0–1	0–0	2–1	3–0	2–0	0–1	1–1	—	0–0	0–0	0–2	1–0	0–0	0–1
ES Hammam-Sousse	1–0	4–2	0–0	0–1	0–0	1–0	1–1	0–3	—	2–1	0–4	0–1	0–1	0–0
EO Goulette et Kram	0–1	1–1	0–0	0–0	0–0	0–0	0–1	2–1	0–0	—	0–1	0–0	1–0	0–1
Étoile du Sahel	1–1	1–0	1–2	2–0	5–0	2–1	3–1	4–2	1–1	3–0	—	3–2	2–1	1–1
Olympique Béja	1–2	1–1	1–0	2–1	1–1	0–0	1–2	1–0	1–0	2–1	1–1	—	0–0	2–1
Stade Tunisien	2–1	0–1	2–1	0–3	0–0	4–0	2–3	0–0	1–1	1–3	0–0	3–0	—	2–1
US Monastir	3–0	4–4	2–2	1–0	2–1	1–1	1–1	1–0	1–0	1–0	0–0	3–0	1–2	—

Updated to match(es) played on May 27, 2007. Source: Ligue 1
Legend: Blue = home team win; Yellow = draw; Red = away team win.
