= Tunisian Super Cup =

- Organiser(s): Tunisian Football Federation
- Founded: 1960; 66 years ago
- Region: Tunisia
- Teams: 2
- Current champions: Espérance de Tunis (8th title)
- Most championships: Espérance de Tunis (8 titles)
- 2024–25 Tunisian Super Cup

The Tunisian Super Cup (Arabic: كأس السوبر التونسي) or the Tunisia Premier Cup (Arabic: كأس تونس الممتازة) previously called the Tunisian Cup Winners' Cup, is a Tunisian football competition organized by the Tunisian Football Federation. Established in 1960, it combines the champions of the first Tunisian Ligue Professionnelle 1 against the champions of the Tunisian Cup.

Espérance Sportive de Tunis is the most successful team with a record 8 titles.

== History ==
=== First editions and frequent interruptions ===
Formerly called the Cup of Cups, it was organized as part of President Habib Bourguiba's birthday celebrations. According to the laws of the Tunisian Football Federation, it is a competition that takes place every year, but since its return in 1994 it has only been organized three times in 1994, 1995 and 2001. The 2007–08 season was to be held on 7 February 2009 between the champions of Tunisian Ligue Professionnelle 1 Club Africain and the Tunisian Cup holders of Espérance de Tunis, but the match did not take place because of the intensity of the calendar, especially after the adoption of two new Maghreb competitions, as well as the next match, which was scheduled on 20 February 2010. Espérance de Tunis, who won the Tunisian Ligue Professionnelle 1 in and Olympique Béja the Tunisian Cup holders, also did not meet.

=== Back to the front (since 2019) ===
After a hiatus of 18 years, the next edition of the Tunisian Super Cup was held on 1 April 2019 at Abdullah bin Khalifa Stadium in Doha, Qatar. Between Espérance de Tunis the 2017–18 Tunisian Ligue Professionnelle 1 champions and Club Athletic Bizertin the 2017–18 Tunisian Ligue Professionnelle 1 fifth as a substitute for Club Africain the 2017–18 Tunisian Cup winners. The match was supposed to be played between Espérance de Tunis, the champion of the Tunisian Ligue Professionnelle 1, and Club Africain, the champion of the Tunisian Cup. Secondly, the selection for the 2017–18 Tunisian Cup runner-up, Etoile Sportive du Sahel, who refused the invitation due to the overcrowded calendar, finally reached a solution with Club Bizertin (the fifth of the 2017–18 Tunisian Ligue Professionnelle 1 and one of the semi-finalists of the 2017–18 Tunisian Cup).Esperance Sportive de Tunis won the title for the fourth time in its history in the first edition in 18 years, after winning the match with a score of 2–1.

After next season, On 10 February 2019, the Tunisian Football Federation decided to fix the 2018–19 Tunisian Super Cup date to 15 March 2020. However, the match was postponed to 20 September 2020, due to the COVID-19 pandemic. Finally the match was played on 20 September 2020 at Hammadi Agrebi Stadium between Espérance de Tunis the 2018–19 Tunisian Ligue Professionnelle 1 champions Espérance de Tunis and CS Sfaxien the 2018–19 Tunisian Cup winners. After the end of the regular time with a 0–0 draw, Espérance de Tunis decided the title on penalties 5–4.

The 2019–20 Tunisian Super Cup was scheduled to be played on 30 July 2021, but like the previous version, the match was postponed to 18 September 2021 due to the COVID-19 pandemic. The match was played on the pitch of the Hammadi Agrebi Stadium between Espérance de Tunis the 2019–20 Tunisian Ligue Professionnelle 1 champions and US Monastir the 2019–20 Tunisian Cup winners. After the end of the regular time with a 1–1 draw, US Monastir decided the title on penalties 5–3.

The 2020–21 Tunisian Super Cup match was played on 25 September 2021, a week after the previous edition, on the pitch of the Hammadi Agrebi Stadium between Espérance de Tunis the 2020–21 Tunisian Ligue Professionnelle 1 champions and CS Sfaxien the 2020–21 Tunisian Cup winners. Espérance de Tunis won the title for the sixth time in its history, after winning the match 1–0 with the goal of Anayo Iwuala in the 57th minute.

The 2022–23 Tunisian Super Cup match was played on 7 January 2024, on the pitch of the Hammadi Agrebi Stadium between Étoile du Sahel the 2022–23 Tunisian Ligue Professionnelle 1 champions and Olympique Béja the 2022–23 Tunisian Cup winners. Olympique Béja won the title for the second time in its history, after winning the match 2–0.

The 2023–24 Tunisian Super Cup match was played on 16 February 2025, on the pitch of the Hammadi Agrebi Stadium between Espérance de Tunis the 2023–24 Tunisian Ligue Professionnelle 1 champions and Stade Tunisien the 2023–24 Tunisian Cup winners. Espérance de Tunis won the title for the seventh time in its history, after winning the match 2–0.

== Finals ==
Legend
Tunisian Ligue Professionnelle 1 champion
Tunisian Cup champion
Inviting Team / Play-off match winner
Match decided by a penalty shootout

N°	Season	Winners	Score	Runners-up	Date	Referee	Venue
1	1960	Espérance de Tunis	2–1	Stade Tunisien	Unknown		
2	1966	Stade Tunisien	2–0	Étoile du Sahel	Unknown		
3	1968	Club Africain	3–1	Sfax RS	Unknown		
4	1970	Club Africain	1–0	Espérance de Tunis	Unknown		
5	1973	Étoile du Sahel	5–2	Club Africain	Unknown		
6	1979	Club Africain	1–0	Espérance de Tunis	Unknown		
7	1984	CA Bizertin	1–0	AS Marsa	Unknown		
8	1985	CS Hammam-Lif	1–0	Espérance de Tunis	Unknown		
9	1986	Étoile du Sahel	1–1 (5–4 p)	Espérance de Tunis	Unknown		
10	1987	Étoile du Sahel	0–0 (7–6 p)	CA Bizertin	Unknown		
11	1994	Espérance de Tunis	2–0	AS Marsa	Unknown		
12	1995	Olympique Béja	1–1 (5–4 p)	CS Sfaxien	Unknown		
13	2001	Espérance de Tunis	3–1	CS Hammam-Lif	27 September 2001		
14	2017–18	Espérance de Tunis	2–1	CA Bizertin (Note: The 2017–18 Tunisian Super Cup was supposed to be played between the 2017–18 Tunisian Ligue Professionnelle 1 champion, Espérance de Tunis, and the 2017–18 Tunisian Cup champion, Club Africain, but the match was postponed several times due to the critical financial and administrative situation for Club Africain, and finally withdrew from the Super Cup. The second choice was made for the runner-up of the 2017–18 Tunisian Cup, Étoile du Sahel. The invitation was rejected due to the overcrowding of the calendar. Finally, a solution was reached with the CA Bizertin, one of the semi-finalist of the 2017–18 Tunisian Cup, to occupy that place and compete in the 2017–18 Tunisian Super Cup.)	1 April 2019	(Tunisia) Youssef Serairi	(Qatar) Abdullah bin Khalifa Stadium, Doha
15	2018–19	Espérance de Tunis	0–0 (5–4 p)	CS Sfaxien	20 September 2020	(Tunisia) Naim Hosni	(Tunisia) Hammadi Agrebi Stadium, Tunis
16	2019–20	US Monastir	1–1 (5–3 p)	Espérance de Tunis	18 September 2021	(Tunisia) Oussama Razgallah	(Tunisia) Hammadi Agrebi Stadium, Tunis
17	2020–21	Espérance de Tunis	1–0	CS Sfaxien	25 September 2021	(Tunisia) Amir Loussif	(Tunisia) Hammadi Agrebi Stadium, Tunis
—	2021–22	The 2021–22 Tunisian Super Cup between Espérance de Tunis and CS Sfaxien did not played due to a congested schedule.					
18	2022–23	Olympique Béja	2–0	Étoile du Sahel	7 January 2024	(Tunisia) Karim Khemiri	(Tunisia) Hammadi Agrebi Stadium, Tunis
19	2023–24	Espérance de Tunis	2–0	Stade Tunisien	16 February 2025	(Egypt) Mahmoud Nagy	(Tunisia) Hammadi Agrebi Stadium, Tunis
20	2024–25	Espérance de Tunis	1–0	Stade Tunisien (Note: In the 2024–25 season, Espérance de Tunis won the double the league and the cup. As there was no regulation specifying who the opponent should be in such a scenario, the Tunisian Football Federation has scheduled a play-off match between the league runner-up, US Monastir and the cup runner-up, Stade Tunisien to determine the opponent who will face Espérance in the Super Cup match. Stade Tunisien won the play-off match 2–0.)	3 August 2025	(Tunisia) Houssem Boularesse	(Tunisia) Hammadi Agrebi Stadium, Tunis
21	2025–26	Club Africain v Espérance de Tunis			31 January 2027	TBA	(Tunisia) Hammadi Agrebi Stadium, Tunis

== Summary ==
Club	Winners	Runners-up	Total finals	Winning years	Runner-up Years
Espérance de Tunis	8	5	13	1960, 1994, 2001, 2017–18, 2018–19, 2020–21, 2023–24, 2024–25	1970, 1979, 1985, 1986, 2019–20
Étoile du Sahel	3	2	5	1973, 1986, 1987	1966, 2022–23
Club Africain	3	1	4	1968, 1970, 1979	1973
Olympique Béja	2	–	2	1995, 2022–23	—
Stade Tunisien	1	3	4	1966	1960, 2023–24, 2024–25
CA Bizertin	1	2	3	1984	1987, 2017–18
CS Hammam-Lif	1	1	2	1985	2001
US Monastir	1	–	1	2019–20	—
CS Sfaxien	–	3	3	—	1995, 2018–19, 2020–21
AS Marsa	–	2	2	—	1984, 1994
Sfax RS	–	1	1	—	1968

== See also ==
- Tunisian Ligue Professionnelle 1
- Tunisian Cup
