= Khalil Sassi =

Tunisian footballer

Personal information
- Date of birth: 5 September 1994 (age 32)
- Height: 1.85 m (6 ft 1 in)
- Position: Defender

Senior career*
Years	Team	Apps	(Gls)
2013–2017	Club Africain	0	(0)
2014–2015	→ AS Gabès (loan)	6	(0)
2015–2016	→ EO Sidi Bouzid (loan)	17	(0)
2016–2017	→ JS Kairouan (loan)	4	(0)
2017	→ US Tataouine (loan)	15	(0)
2017–2019	Olympique Béja		
2019–2022	CA Bizertin	39	(3)
- * Club domestic league appearances and goals

Khalil Sassi (born 5 September 1994) is a Tunisian football defender.
