= Yassine Chamakhi =

Tunisian footballer

Personal information
- Date of birth: 27 February 1995 (age 31)
- Place of birth: Tunis, Tunisia
- Height: 1.75 m (5 ft 9 in)
- Position: Forward

Senior career*
| Years | Team | Apps | (Gls) |
| 2016–2017 | Olympique Béja | 11 | (2) |
| 2017–2022 | Club Africain | 90 | (27) |
| 2022-2023 | Al-Ahli SC (Tripoli) | | |
| 2022-2025 | ES Sahel | 52 | (8) |

International career^{‡}
| 2019 | Tunisia | 1 | (0) |
- * Club domestic league appearances and goals as of 25 July 2025 @ 10:55(AEST) ‡ National team caps and goals as of 3 April 2019

Yassine Chamakhi (born 27 February 1995) is a Tunisian professional footballer who most recently played as a midfielder for ES Sahel. He made one appearance the Tunisian national team in 2019.

== Club career ==
Chamakhi made his professional debut with Olympique Béja in a 3–0 Tunisian Ligue Professionnelle 1 loss to Club Africain on 25 September 2016.

== International career ==
Chamakhi made his professional debut for the Tunisia national team in a 1–0 friendly loss to Algeria on 26 March 2019.
