= 2022–23 Tunisian Super Cup =

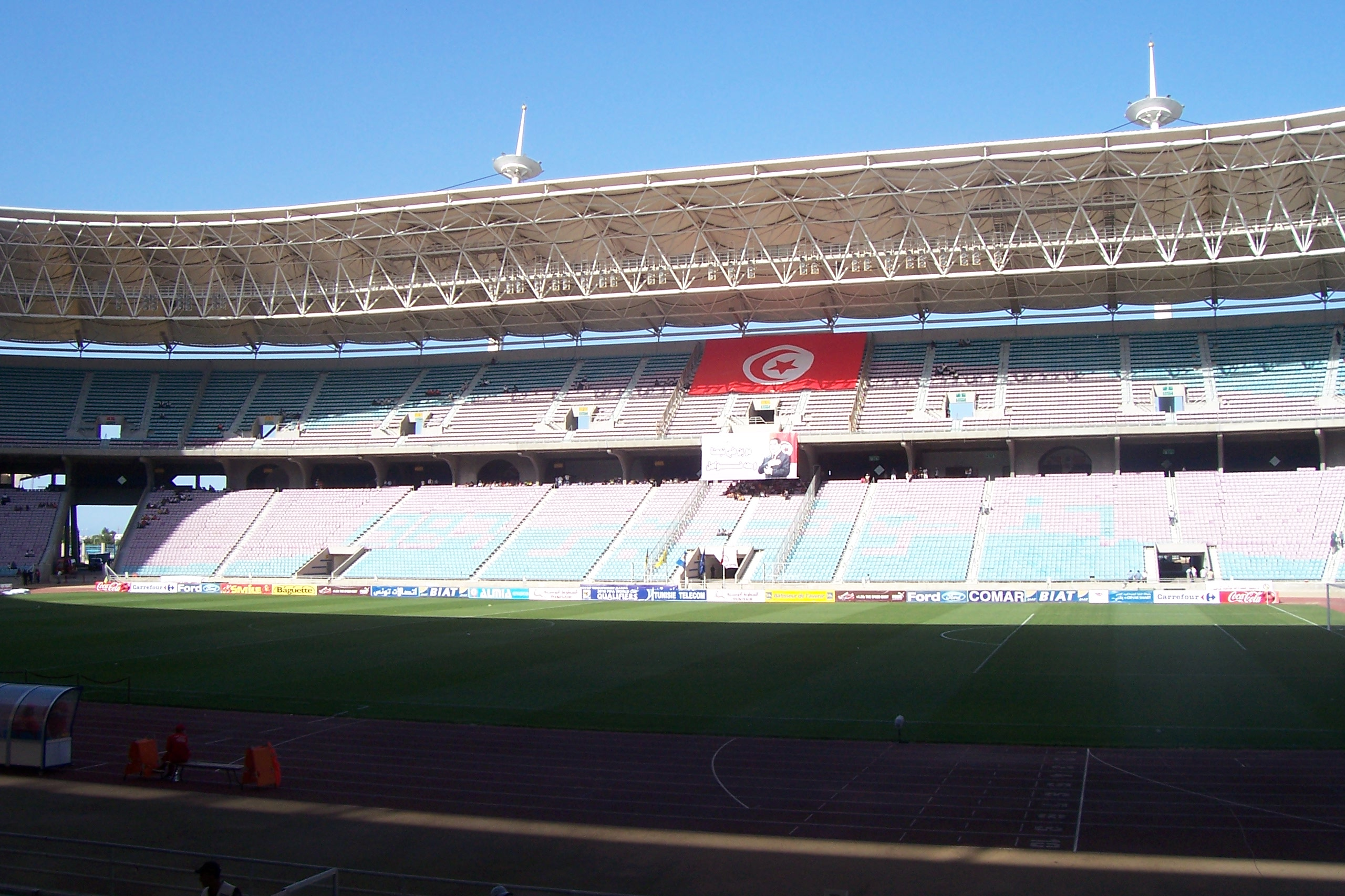
- Stade Hammadi Agrebi hosted the match
Étoile du Sahel	Olympique Béja
Ligue 1	Tunisian Cup
0	2
- Date: 7 January 2024
- Venue: Stade Hammadi Agrebi, Tunis
- Referee: Karim Khemiri
- Weather: Partly sunny 12 °C (54 °F); 71% humidity

The 2022–23 Tunisian Super Cup was the 18th edition of the Tunisian Super Cup. The match was contested by the 2022–23 Tunisian Ligue Professionnelle 1 champions, Étoile du Sahel and the Tunisian Cup winners, Olympique Béja. The match took place at Stade Hammadi Agrebi in Tunis on 7 January 2024.

== Venue ==
Hammadi Agrebi Stadium, formerly known as 7 November Stadium is a multi-purpose stadium in Radès, Tunis, Tunisia about 10 kilometers south-east of the city center of Tunis, in the center of the Olympic City. It is currently used mostly for football matches and it also has facilities for athletics. The stadium holds 60,000 and was built in 2001 for the 2001 Mediterranean Games and is considered to be one of the best stadiums in Africa.

== Match ==
7 January 2024
16:00

Étoile du Sahel	0–2	Olympique Béja
	Report	Ba 44'; Mkaddem 90+8'

Stade Hammadi Agrebi, Tunis
Referee: Karim Khemiri

== See also ==
- 2022–23 Tunisian Ligue Professionnelle 1
- 2022–23 Tunisian Cup
