= Klousseh Agbozo =

Togolese footballer

Personal information
- Date of birth: 26 June 1994 (age 32)
- Place of birth: Lomé, Togo
- Height: 1.80 m (5 ft 11 in)
- Position: Centre-back

Senior career*
Years	Team	Apps	(Gls)
2016–2020	Dynamic Togolais		
2020–2023	Olympique Béja	33	(2)
2022	→ Al Ahli SC (Tripoli) (loan)	0	(0)
2023–2024	Al-Quwa Al-Jawiya		(0)
2024	Al-Naft		
2024–2025	Stade Tunisien	6	(0)

International career^{‡}
2019–2024	Togo	17	(0)
- * Club domestic league appearances and goals as of 06:44, 13 March 2026 (UTC) ‡ National team caps and goals as of 06:44, 13 March 2026 (UTC)

Klousseh Agbozo (born 26 June 1994) is a Togolese professional footballer who plays as a centre-back.

== Career ==
Agbozo began his career with the Togolese side Dynamic Togolais, before moving to Olympique Béja on 1 November 2020. He debuted with Béja in a 2–2 Tunisian Ligue Professionnelle 1 tie with Stade Tunisien on 6 December 2020.

== International career ==
Agbozo made his debut with the Togo national team in a 0–0 tie with Benin on 28 July 2019 in the 2020 African Nations Championship qualification.
