= Amine Ltifi =

Tunisian footballer

Amine Ltaïef
Personal information
- Date of birth: 4 July 1984 (age 42)
- Place of birth: Tunis, Tunisia
- Height: 1.82 m (6 ft 0 in)
- Position: Forward

Youth career
- Espérance

Senior career*
Years	Team	Apps	(Gls)
2000–2002	Espérance		
2003–2005	US Créteil	9	(1)
2005–2009	Espérance	?	(21)
2009–2010	CS Hammam-Lif	?	(3)
2010–2011	A.S. Marsa	19	(5)
2011–2013	Étoile du Sahel	8	(2)
2013–2014	EGS Gafsa	19	(3)

International career
2004–2006	Tunisia	5	(1)
- * Club domestic league appearances and goals

Amine Ltaïef (Arabic: أمين لطيفي; born 4 July 1984) is a Tunisian former professional footballer who played as a forward.

He was part of the Tunisia national team at the 2004 Summer Olympics, which exited in the first round, finishing third in group C, behind group and gold medal winners Argentina and runners-up Australia. He was also in the 2006 African Cup of Nations squad.

== Career ==
- July 2001 – July 2003: Espérance Sportive de Tunis (Tunisia)
- July 2003 – January 2005: US Créteil-Lusitanos (France)
- January 2005 – July 2009: Espérance Sportive de Tunis (Tunisia)
- July 2009 – July 2010: Club Sportif de Hammam-Lif (Tunisia)
- July 2010 – July 2011: Avenir Sportif de La Marsa (Tunisia)
- July 2011 – January 2013: Étoile Sportive du Sahel (Tunisia)
- January 2013 – July 2014: EGS Gafsa (Tunisia)
