= Amine Haboubi =

Tunisian footballer (born 2002)

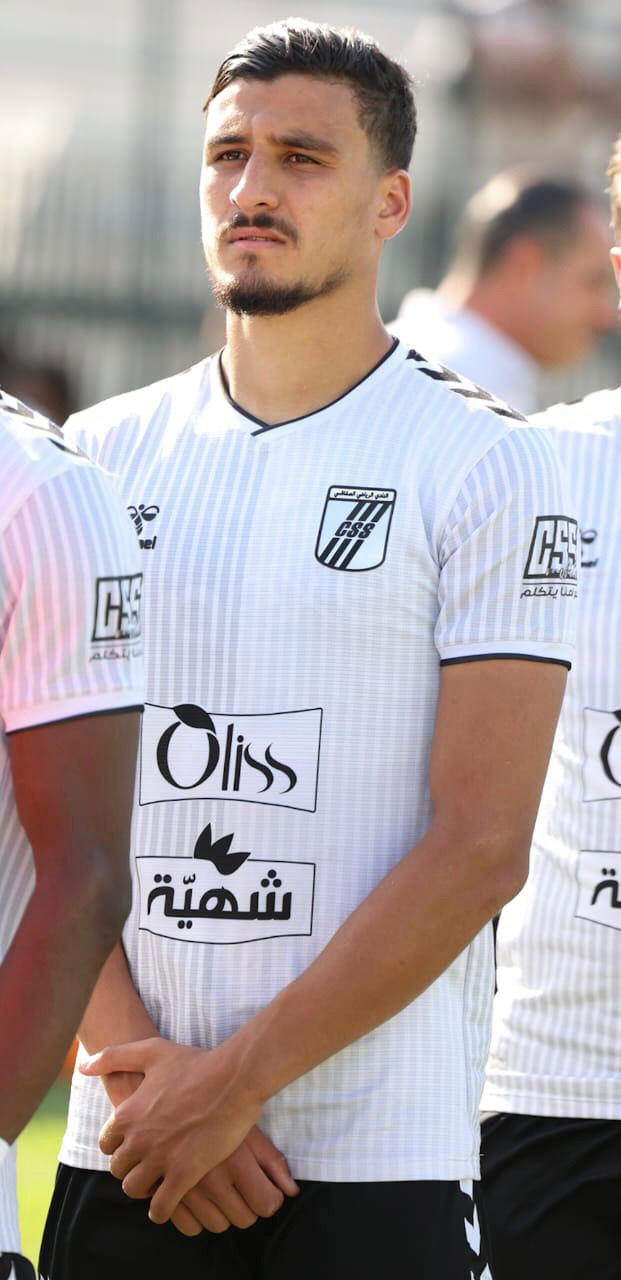
- Haboubi in 2023.

Personal information
- Full name: Amine Allah Haboubi
- Date of birth: 29 April 2002 (age 24)
- Place of birth: Béja, Tunisia
- Height: 1.84 m (6 ft 0 in)
- Position: Forward

Team information
- Current team: Stade Tunisien
- Number: 19

Youth career
- 2011–2018: Olympique Béja

Senior career*
Years	Team	Apps	(Gls)
2019–2022	Olympique Béja	31	(4)
2023–2025	CS Sfaxien	52	(5)
2025	FC Differdange 03	3	(0)
2025–	Stade Tunisien	1	(0)
- * Club domestic league appearances and goals as of 28 August 2025

Amine Allah Haboubi (born 29 April 2002; Arabic: امين الحبوبي) is a Tunisian professional footballer.

== Career ==
He began with Olympique Béja, where he passed all categories.

At the end of January 2023, he signed a contract with the CS Sfaxien team until 2026.
