= Mohamed Ali Amri =

Tunisian footballer

Personal information
- Date of birth: 19 May 1996 (age 30)
- Height: 1.84 m (6 ft 0 in)
- Position: Striker

Team information
- Current team: Al-Madina SC
- Number: 11

Senior career*
Years	Team	Apps	(Gls)
2011–2012?	CS Hammam-Lif		
2015–2016	ES Métlaoui		
2016	ES Zarzis		
2017–2018	CO Médenine		
2018–2021	US Monastir		
2021–	Al-Ittihad		
2021–2024	Club Africain		
2024–	Al-Madina SC		
- * Club domestic league appearances and goals

Mohamed Ali Amri (born 19 May 1996) is a Tunisian football midfielder.
