= EO La Goulette et du Kram =

Tunisian football club

EO Goulette Kram
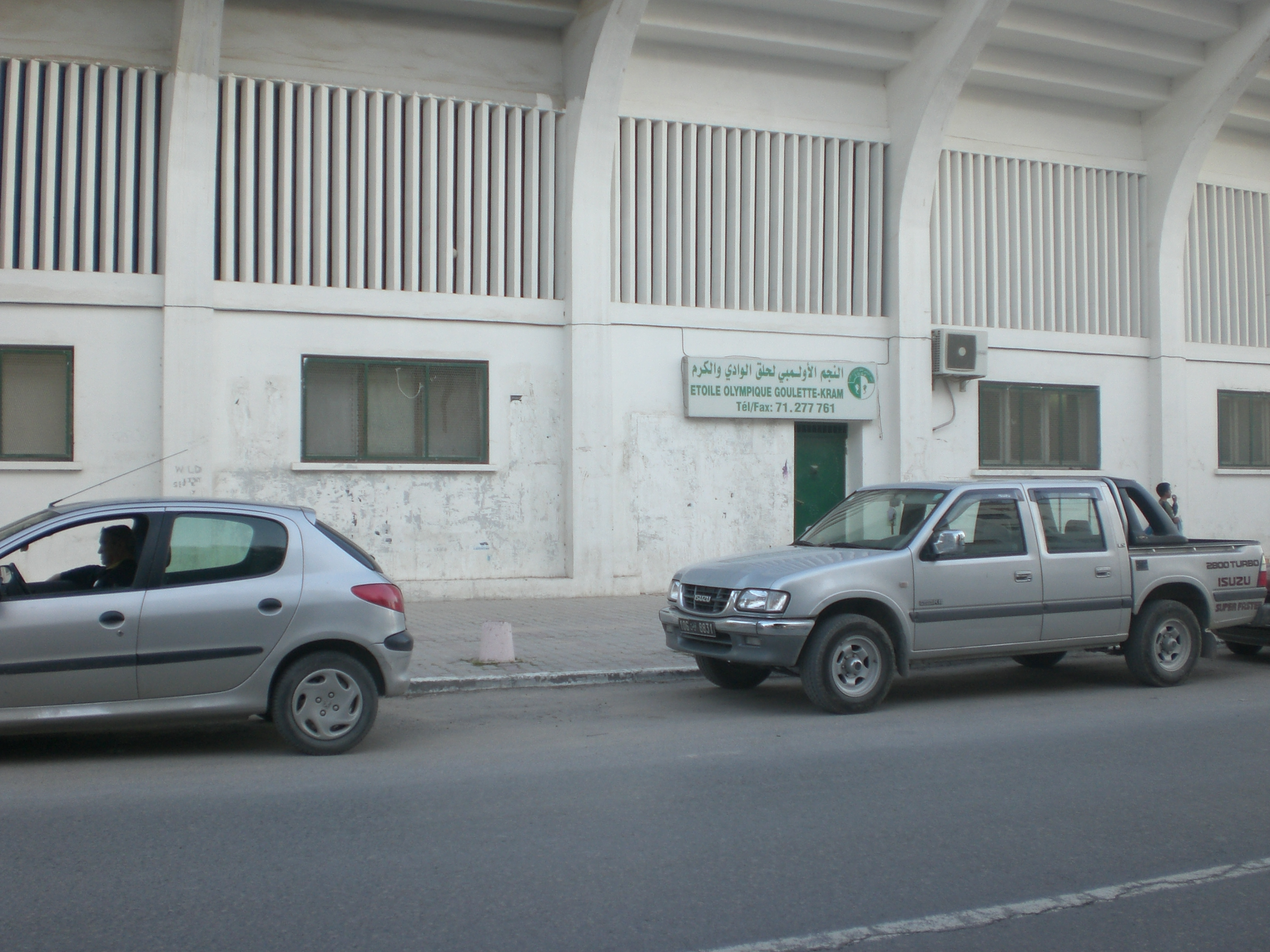
- Full name: Etoile Olympique de la Goulette et du Kram
- Founded: 1950
- Ground: Stade Abdelaziz Chtioui; La Marsa, Tunisia
- Capacity: 6,000
- Chairman: Houssam Trabelsi
- Manager: Lotfi Jbara
- League: CLP-3
Home colours	Away colours

Etoile Olympique de La Goulette et du Kram (Arabic: النجم الأولمبي لحلق الوادي والكرم), often referred to as EOGK. is a football club from La Goulette in Tunisia. Founded in 1950, the team plays in green and white colours. The club's current chairman is Mr. Houssam Trabelsi.

The club was relegated from the Ligue Professionnelle 1 to the Ligue Professionnelle 2 in 2006–07 and further relegated to the Ligue Professionnelle 3 in 2007–08.
