= 2001–02 Tunisian Ligue Professionnelle 1 =

Tunisian Ligue Professionnelle 1
- Season: 2001–02
- Champions: Espérance de Tunis
- Relegated: CO Médenine; CO Transports
- Champions League: Espérance de Tunis
- Cup Winners' Cup: Étoile du Sahel
- CAF Cup: Club Africain
- Matches: 132
- Goals: 285 (2.16 per match)
- Top goalscorer: Kandia Traoré (13 goals)
- Biggest home win: ES Zarzis 5–0 COT
- Biggest away win: COT 1–6 US Monastir
- Highest scoring: COT 1–6 US Monastir

The 2001–02 Tunisian Ligue Professionnelle 1 season was the 47th season of top-tier football in Tunisia.

== Results ==
=== League table ===
Pos	Team	Pld	W	D	L	GF	GA	GD	Pts	Qualification or relegation
1	Espérance de Tunis	22	13	7	2	40	19	+21	46	Qualification to the 2003 CAF Champions League
2	Étoile du Sahel	22	11	6	5	28	18	+10	39	Qualification to the 2003 African Cup Winners' Cup
3	Club Africain	22	9	8	5	31	26	+5	35	Qualification to the 2003 CAF Cup
4	CS Sfaxien	22	7	10	5	29	29	0	31	
5	CS Hammam-Lif	22	6	10	6	23	27	−4	28 (Note: In the games between these three teams, CS Hammam-Lif got 8 points, Stade Tunisien 4 (GD -1) and Olympique Béja 4 (GD -2). See the Result table below for more details.)	
6	Stade Tunisien	22	5	13	4	26	19	+7	28	
7	Olympique Béja	22	7	7	8	17	21	−4	28	
8	CA Bizertin	22	5	12	5	16	17	−1	27	
9	ES Zarzis	22	7	4	11	23	25	−2	25	
10	US Monastir	22	5	8	9	22	20	+2	23	
11	CO Médenine	22	6	5	11	15	26	−11	23	Relegation to the Tunisian Ligue Professionnelle 2
12	CO Transports	22	1	10	11	15	38	−23	13	Relegation to the Tunisian Ligue Professionnelle 2

Updated to match(es) played on 1 May 2002. Source: Ligue 1
Rules for classification: 1) points; 2) goal difference; 3) number of goals scored.

=== Result table ===
Home \ Away	CA	CAB	COM	COT	CSHL	CSS	EST	ESZ	ESS	OB	ST	USM
Club Africain	—	2–1	3–0	1–0	3–3	1–1	1–2	1–1	2–0	2–0	1–1	3–1
CA Bizertin	1–0	—	2–0	0–0	0–1	2–2	2–1	2–0	0–0	0–0	1–1	0–0
CO Médenine	3–0	0–1	—	1–0	1–0	0–1	0–0	2–0	1–3	1–0	1–1	1–0
Club Olympique des Transports	0–0	0–0	2–1	—	2–3	2–2	0–2	0–1	0–2	1–1	0–4	1–6
CS Hammam-Lif	1–2	0–0	0–0	2–2	—	3–3	0–3	2–1	1–1	2–0	1–1	1–0
CS Sfaxien	1–3	1–1	2–2	2–1	1–0	—	1–3	1–0	0–0	1–0	0–0	2–1
ES Tunis	3–0	2–0	2–0	1–1	2–2	1–1	—	2–0	3–2	1–0	3–1	2–1
ES Zarzis	1–2	1–0	1–0	5–0	3–0	2–1	1–1	—	1–2	1–3	1–2	0–1
Étoile du Sahel	1–1	1–1	1–0	1–0	2–0	3–2	2–0	1–2	—	3–1	2–0	1–0
Olympique Béja	1–1	1–1	1–1	1–1	0–0	2–1	0–2	1–0	1–0	—	1–0	1–0
Stade Tunisien	1–1	4–1	4–0	1–1	0–1	1–1	2–2	1–1	0–0	1–0	—	0–0
US Monastir	3–1	0–0	2–0	1–1	0–0	1–2	2–2	0–0	2–0	1–2	0–0	—

Updated to match(es) played on 1 May 2002. Source: Ligue 1
Legend: Blue = home team win; Yellow = draw; Red = away team win.
