= 2022–23 Espérance Sportive de Tunis season =

Espérance de Tunis
2022–23 season
- President: Hamdi Meddeb
- Head coach: Nabil Maâloul (until 13 May); Anis Boussaïdi (caretaker, from 14 to 22 May); Mouin Chaâbani (from 22 May)
- Stadium: Stade Hammadi Agrebi
- Ligue 1: Runners-up
- Tunisian Cup: Runners-up
- CAF Champions League: Semi-finals
- Top goalscorer: League: Anice Badri (10); All: Mohamed Ali Ben Romdhane (14)
- Biggest win: Union de Tataouine 1–6 Espérance de Tunis (30 June 2023)
- Biggest defeat: Espérance de Tunis 0–3 Al Ahly (12 May 2023)

The 2022–23 Espérance Sportive de Tunis season was the 104th season in existence and the club's 68th consecutive season in the top flight of Tunisian football. In addition to the domestic league, Espérance de Tunis participated in this season's editions of the Tunisian Cup and the CAF Champions League.

Espérance de Tunis was not scheduled to play any matches between 9 November and 10 December as Mohamed Ali Ben Romdhane, Ghailene Chaalali and Yassine Meriah participated with Tunisia at 2022 FIFA World Cup in Qatar.

Despite finishing second in the league and advancing to the Champions League semi-finals, Espérance de Tunis went trophyless and lost the Tunisian Ligue Professionnelle 1 for the first time since the 2015–16 season.

== Squad list ==
Note: Flags indicate national team as has been defined under FIFA eligibility rules. Players may hold more than one non-FIFA nationality.

No.	Nat.	Name	Date of birth (age)	Signed from
Goalkeepers
1	(Tunisia)	Mohamed Sedki Debchi	28 October 1999 (aged 23)	(Tunisia) Avenir de Gabès
12	(Tunisia)	Moez Ben Cherifia (C)	24 June 1991 (aged 32)	(Tunisia) Youth system
16	(Tunisia)	Hamza Ghanmi	15 April 1998 (aged 25)	(Tunisia) Youth system
26	(Tunisia)	Amenallah Memmiche	20 April 2004 (aged 19)	(Tunisia) Youth system
38	(Tunisia)	Wassim Karoui	7 January 1997 (aged 26)	(Tunisia) Youth system
Defenders
2	(Tunisia)	Mohamed Ben Ali	16 February 1995 (aged 28)	(Tunisia) Club Sfaxien
4	(Algeria)	Mohamed Amine Tougai	22 January 2000 (aged 23)	(Algeria) NA Hussein Dey
6	(Tunisia)	Mohamed Ali Yacoubi	5 October 1990 (aged 32)	(France) Quevilly-Rouen
13	(Tunisia)	Amenallah Majhed	18 July 2003 (aged 19)	(Tunisia) Youth system
20	(Tunisia)	Mohamed Amine Ben Hamida	15 December 1995 (aged 27)	(Tunisia) Youth system
22	(Tunisia)	Hani Amamou	16 September 1997 (aged 25)	(Tunisia) Club Sfaxien
24	(Tunisia)	Yassine Meriah	2 July 1993 (aged 29)	(United Arab Emirates) Al Ain
29	(Tunisia)	Zied Machmoum	18 January 1993 (aged 30)	(Tunisia) Union Monastirienne
30	(Tunisia)	Houssem Dagdoug	23 July 1998 (aged 24)	(Tunisia) Club Sfaxien
32	(Tunisia)	Raed Fedaa	20 May 1997 (aged 26)	(Tunisia) Youth system
35	(Tunisia)	Zinedine Sassi	4 August 2003 (aged 19)	(France) Guingamp
36	(Tunisia)	Raed Bouchniba	25 September 2003 (aged 19)	(Tunisia) Youth system
Midfielders
5	(Tunisia)	Mohamed Ali Ben Romdhane	6 September 1999 (aged 23)	(Tunisia) Youth system
11	(Morocco)	Sabir Bougrine	10 July 1996 (aged 26)	(Azerbaijan) Neftçi
15	(Ivory Coast)	Fousseny Coulibaly	12 December 1992 (aged 30)	(Tunisia) Union Monastirienne
18	(Tunisia)	Malek Mehri	21 October 2003 (aged 19)	(Tunisia) Youth system
19	(Tunisia)	Mootez Zaddem	5 January 2001 (aged 22)	(Latvia) Valmiera
23	(Tunisia)	Ghaith Ouahabi	2 May 2003 (aged 20)	(Tunisia) Youth system
25	(Tunisia)	Ghailene Chaalali	28 February 1994 (aged 29)	(Turkey) Yeni Malatyaspor
28	(Tunisia)	Aziz Fellah	9 May 2002 (aged 21)	(Tunisia) Étoile du Sahel
31	(Tunisia)	Zakaria El Ayeb	15 January 2001 (aged 22)	(Tunisia) Youth system
Forwards
3	(Tunisia)	Rached Arfaoui	7 March 1996 (aged 27)	(Tunisia) Avenir de Soliman
7	(Jordan)	Sharara	30 December 1997 (aged 25)	(Libya) Al Ahli Tripoli
8	(Tunisia)	Anice Badri	18 September 1990 (aged 32)	(Saudi Arabia) Ittihad Jeddah
9	(Algeria)	Riad Benayad	2 November 1996 (aged 26)	(Algeria) Paradou
10	(Libya)	Hamdou Elhouni	12 February 1994 (aged 29)	(Portugal) Desportivo das Aves
14	(Tunisia)	Rayen Hamrouni	29 January 2003 (aged 20)	(Tunisia) Youth system
17	(Tunisia)	Zied Berrima	4 September 2001 (aged 21)	(Tunisia) Youth system
21	(Tunisia)	Aziz Abid	3 April 2003 (aged 20)	(Tunisia) Youth system
27	(Tunisia)	Mohamed Ali Ben Hammouda	24 July 1998 (aged 24)	(Tunisia) Avenir de Soliman
33	(Tunisia)	Farouk Mimouni	13 June 2001 (aged 22)	(Tunisia) Youth system
Manager	(Tunisia)	Mouin Chaâbani	18 June 1981 (aged 42)	(Egypt) Ceramica Cleopatra

Staff:

- (Tunisia) Mejdi Traoui (assistant manager) (from 22 May)
- (Tunisia) Anis Boussaïdi (assistant manager)
- (Tunisia) Amine Ltifi (assistant manager)
- (Tunisia) Hamdi Kasraoui (goalkeeper manager)
- (Tunisia) Sabri Bouazizi (fitness manager)
- (Tunisia) Aymen Mathlouthi (fitness manager)
- (Tunisia) Yassine Ben Ahmed (doctor)
- (Tunisia) Lassad Lamari (physiotherapist)
- (Tunisia) Nabil Ghazouani (physiotherapist)
- (Tunisia) Seifeddine Dziri (physiotherapist)
- (Tunisia) Nader Daoud (assistant manager) (until 13 May)
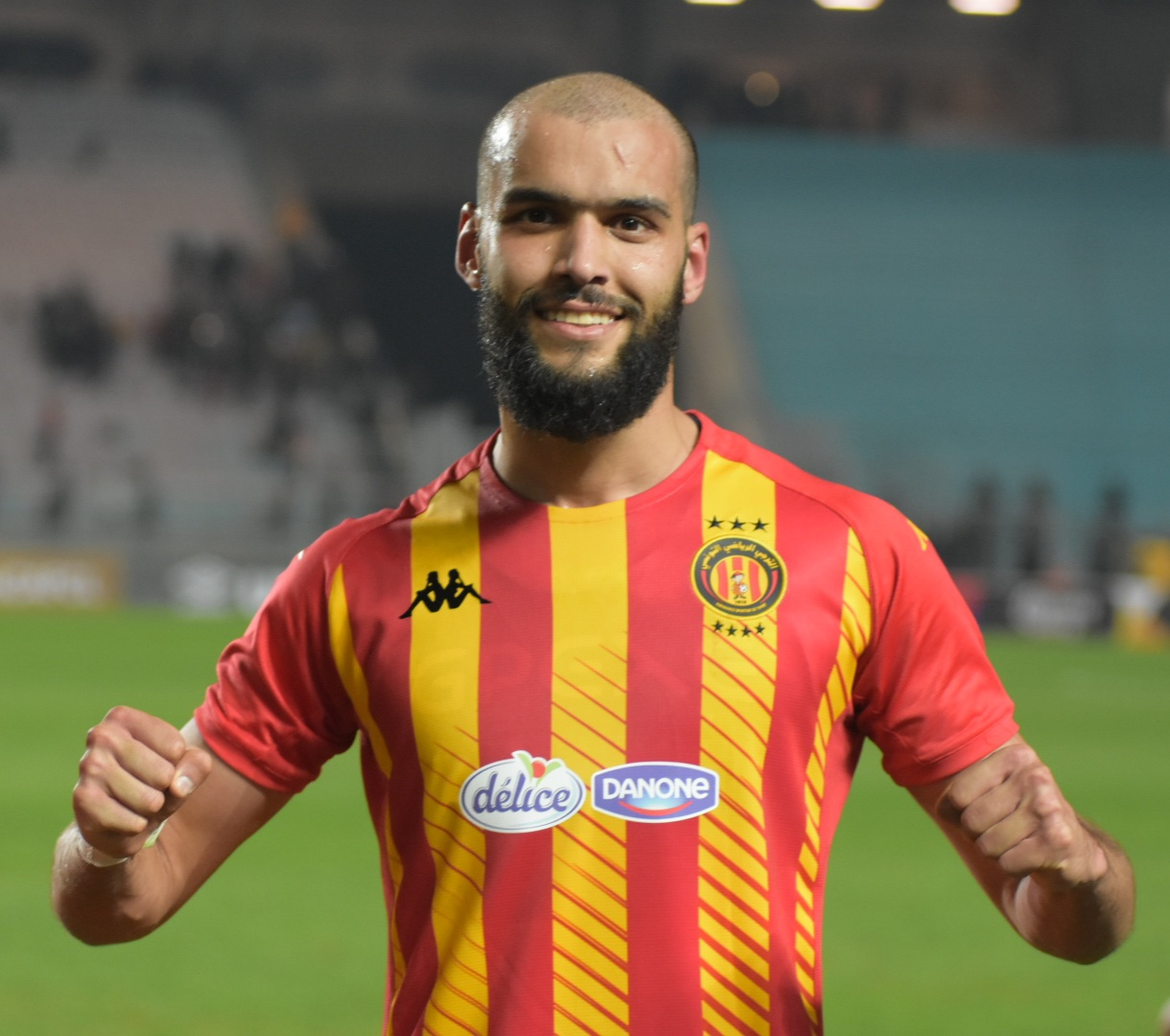
Mohamed Amine Tougai

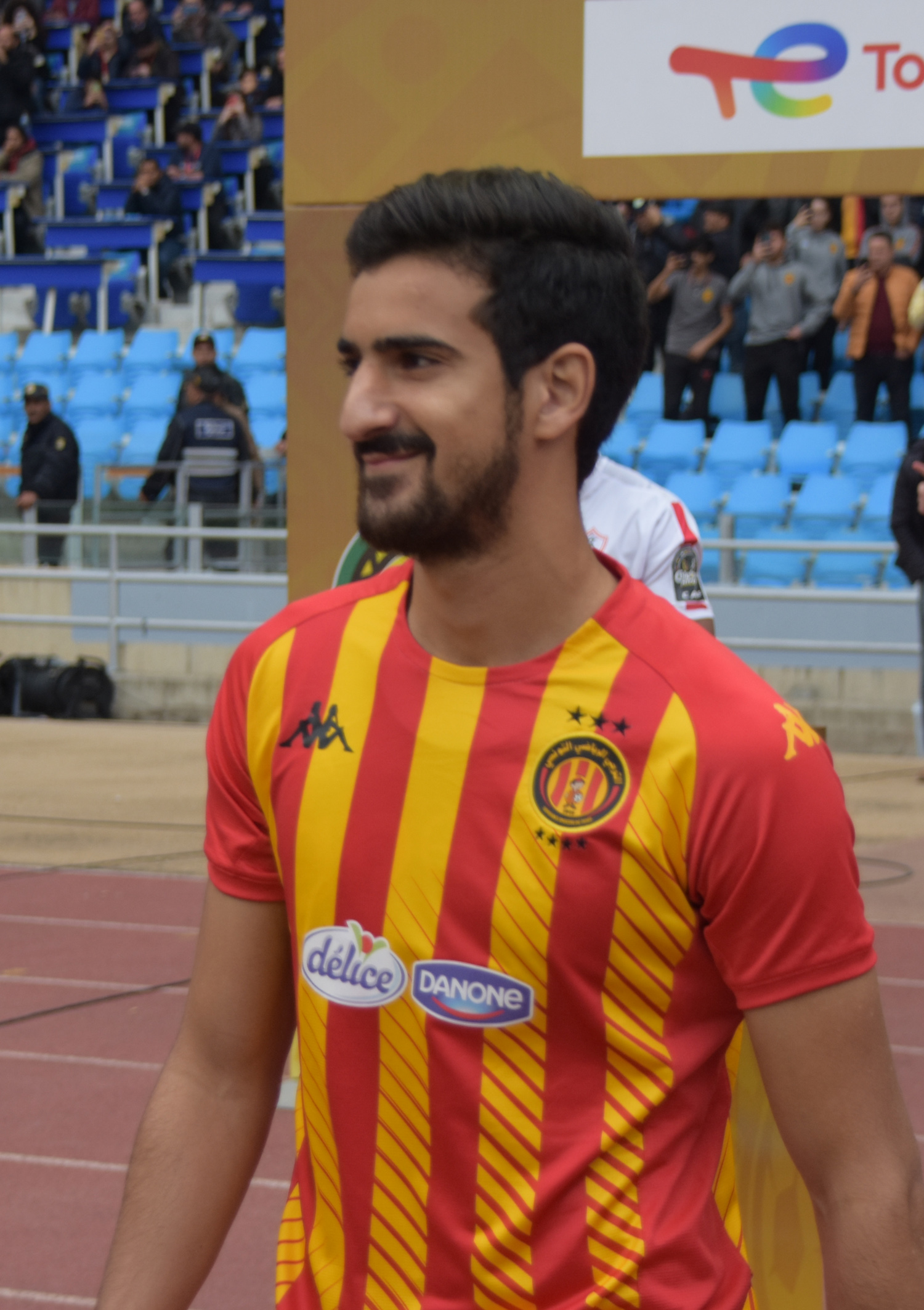
Mohamed Ali Ben Romdhane

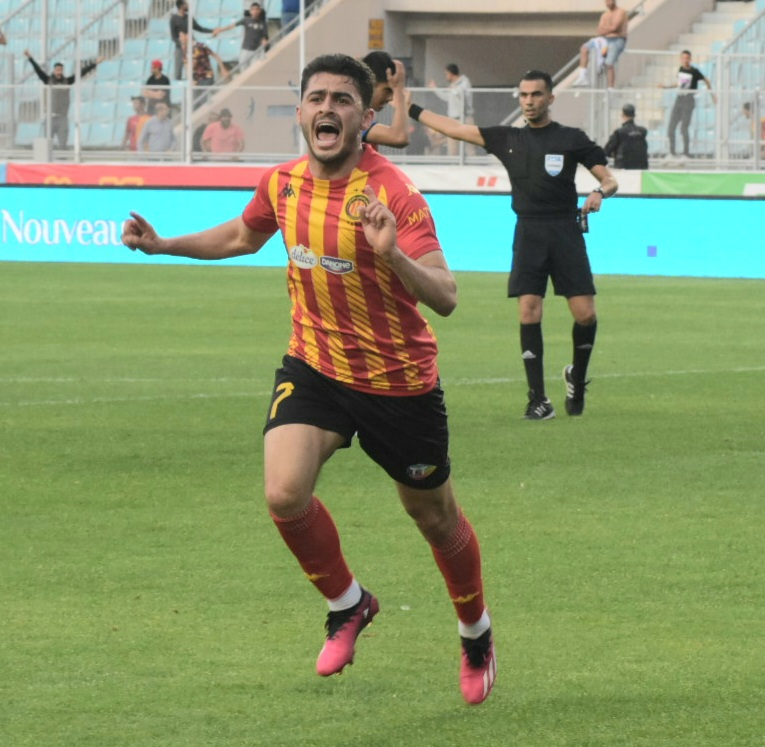
Sharara

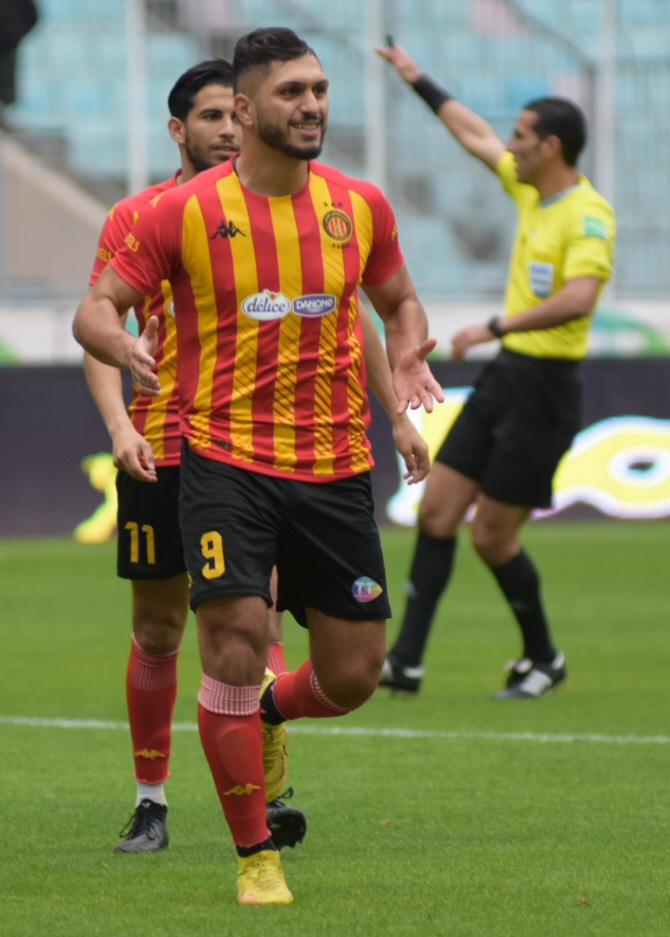
Riad Benayad

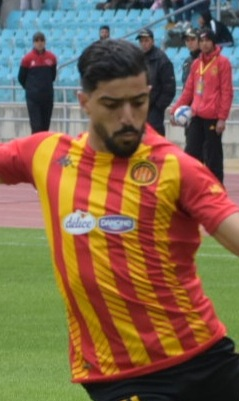
Mohamed Amine Ben Hamida

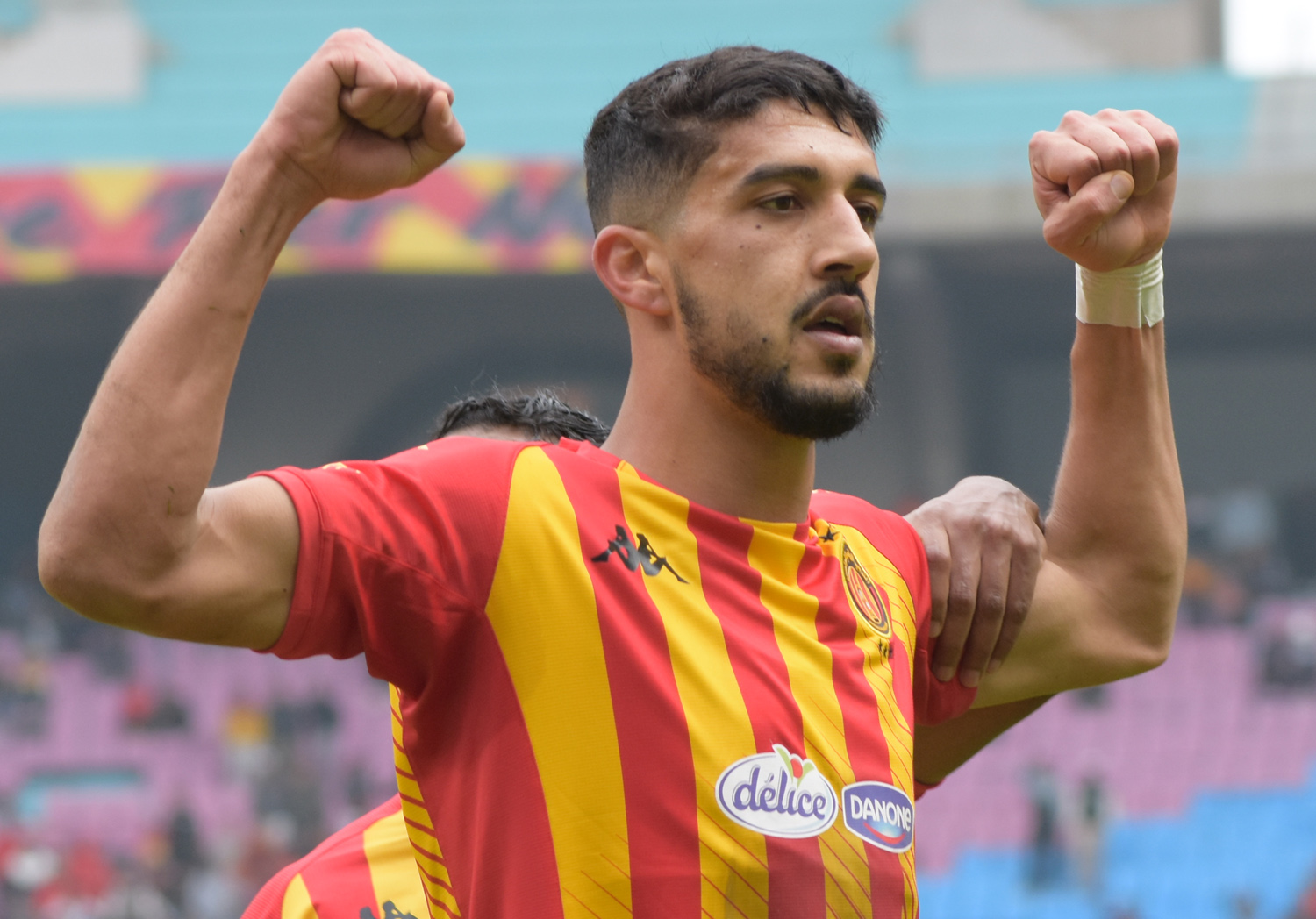
Mohamed Ali Ben Hammouda

== Transfers ==
=== In ===
Date	Name	From	Type	Source
1 July 2022	(Tunisia) Hamza Ghanmi	(Tunisia) Étoile de Métlaoui	End of loan	—
1 July 2022	(Tunisia) Mohamed Ali Ben Hammouda	(Tunisia) Avenir de Soliman	Transfer	
28 July 2022	(Algeria) Riad Benayad	(Algeria) Paradou	Transfer	
28 July 2022	(Tunisia) Aziz Fellah	(Tunisia) Étoile du Sahel	Free transfer	
28 July 2022	(Tunisia) Mohamed Ben Ali	(Tunisia) Club Sfaxien	Free transfer	
28 July 2022	(Tunisia) Houssem Dagdoug	(Tunisia) Club Sfaxien	Free transfer	
4 August 2022	(Tunisia) Yassine Meriah	(United Arab Emirates) Al Ain	Free transfer	
9 August 2022	(Tunisia) Mootez Zaddem	(Latvia) Valmiera	Transfer	
15 August 2022	(Jordan) Sharara	(Libya) Al Ahli Tripoli	Free transfer	
20 August 2022	(Tunisia) Zinedine Sassi	(France) Guingamp	Free transfer	

=== Out ===
Date	Name	To	Type
1 July 2022	(Tunisia) Khalil Chemmam	Retirement	End of contract
1 July 2022	(Tunisia) Sameh Derbali	Retirement	End of contract
1 July 2022	(Algeria) Abdelkader Bedrane	(Saudi Arabia) Damac	End of contract
1 July 2022	(Tunisia) Fedi Ben Choug	(Morocco) Hassania Agadir	End of contract
1 July 2022	(Tunisia) Mohamed Amine Meskini	(Tunisia) Croissant Chebbien	End of contract
1 July 2022	(Nigeria) Samuel Atvati	(Tunisia) Étoile de Métlaoui	End of contract
1 July 2022	(Tunisia) Nour Beji	(Tunisia) Avenir de Gabès	End of contract
1 July 2022	(Tunisia) Farouk Ben Mustapha	Free agent	End of contract
19 July 2022	(Algeria) Ilyes Chetti	(France) Angers	Unilateral termination
28 July 2022	(Nigeria) Kingsley Eduwo	(Kuwait) Al Arabi	Mutual termination
5 August 2022	(Tunisia) Moumen Rahmani	(Tunisia) Avenir de Soliman	Transfer
15 August 2022	(Nigeria) Anayo Iwuala	(Algeria) CR Belouizdad	Loan
15 August 2022	(Ghana) Percious Boah	Free agent	Mutual termination
22 August 2022	(Ivory Coast) David Koffi	(Tunisia) Avenir de Soliman	Loan
25 August 2022	(Tunisia) Montassar Triki	(Tunisia) Avenir de Soliman	Loan
27 August 2022	(Tunisia) Badreddine Mouelhi	(Tunisia) Olympique Sidi Bouzid	Transfer
30 August 2022	(Tunisia) Alaeddine Marzouki	(Saudi Arabia) Al Ain	Mutual termination
13 September 2022	(Tunisia) Khalil Guenichi	(Tunisia) Avenir de Soliman	Loan
18 September 2022	(Tunisia) Ghassen Mahersi	(Tunisia) Avenir de Soliman	Loan
30 September 2022	(Tunisia) Achref Jabri	(Tunisia) Espérance de Zarzis	Loan
26 January 2023	(Tunisia) Bilel Chabbar	(Tunisia) Olympique Sidi Bouzid	Loan
27 April 2023	(Ivory Coast) Cedrik Gbo	(United States) Minnesota United	Loan

== Friendlies ==
15 August 2022 Friendly	Espérance de Tunis	1–0	(Algeria) CR Belouizdad	Tunis
18:30	Benayad 42'	Report		Stadium: Espérance de Tunis Training Center

20 August 2022 Friendly	Espérance de Tunis	1–0	(Algeria) JS Saoura	Tunis
09:00	Zaddem 43'	Report		Stadium: Espérance de Tunis Training Center

26 August 2022 Friendly	Union de Ben Guerdane	0–2	Espérance de Tunis	Djerba
18:00		Report	Benayad 5'; Mimouni 86'	Stadium: Midoun Municipal Stadium

2 September 2022 Friendly	Espérance de Tunis	0–0	Union de Tataouine	Djerba
18:00				Stadium: Midoun Municipal Stadium

10 September 2022 Friendly	Espérance de Tunis	3–1	Espoir de Hammam Sousse	Tunis
17:00	Benayad 29'; Mehri 45'; Ben Hammouda 90+1'		Ben Zine 47'	Stadium: Espérance de Tunis Training Center

11 September 2022 Friendly	Espérance de Tunis	2–2	Avenir de Soliman	Tunis
09:00	Ben Hammouda 26' (pen.); Badri 42'		Rahmani 12'; Babacar 28'	Stadium: Espérance de Tunis Training Center; Referee: Mourad Jerbi

16 September 2022 Friendly	Espérance de Tunis	0–0	Tunisia U23	Tunis
17:45				Stadium: Espérance de Tunis Training Center

24 September 2022 Friendly	Espérance de Tunis	1–1	(Libya) Asswehly	Tunis
16:00	Dagdoug 88'			Stadium: Espérance de Tunis Training Center

2 October 2022 Friendly	Union Monastirienne	1–1	Espérance de Tunis	Monastir
15:00	Ben-Hatira 60'		Elhouni 90+4' (pen.)	Stadium: Stade Mustapha Ben Jannet

19 November 2022 Friendly	Espérance de Tunis	2–2	Olympique Sidi Bouzid	Tunis
11:00	Ben Hamida 47'; Mimouni 72'	Report	Chelly 17'; Oghwiche 39'	Stadium: Espérance de Tunis Training Center

26 November 2022 Friendly	Raja CA (Morocco)	0–1	Espérance de Tunis	Marrakesh, Morocco
17:00 UTC+1		Report	Ben Hammouda 20'	Stadium: Stade de Marrakech; Attendance: 0 (close doors); Referee: Karim Sabry (Morocco)

4 December 2022 Friendly	Espérance de Tunis	3–0	Avenir de Soliman	Tunis
11:00	Zaddem 12'; Benayad 48'; Bougrine 55'	Report		Stadium: Espérance de Tunis Training Center

30 December 2022 Friendly	Espérance de Tunis	2–0	Olympique Béja	Tunis
14:30	Amamou 54'; Elhouni 79'	Report		Stadium: Espérance de Tunis Training Center

== Competitions ==
=== Overview ===
Competition	Record								Starting round	Final position / round	First match	Last match
Competition	G	W	D	L	GF	GA	GD	Win %	Starting round	Final position / round	First match	Last match
Ligue 1	28	16	7	5	45	18	+27	57.14	First round	Runners-up	26 October 2022	30 June 2023
Tunisian Cup	5	4	0	1	11	4	+7	80.00	Round of 32	Runners-up	15 February 2023	28 May 2023
CAF Champions League	12	5	3	4	10	11	−1	41.67	Second round	Semi-finals	9 October 2022	19 May 2023
Total	45	25	10	10	66	33	+33	55.56			9 October 2022	30 June 2023

Source: Competitions

=== Ligue 1 ===
==== First round ====
Group A

===== League table =====
Pos	Team	Pld	W	D	L	GF	GA	GD	Pts	Qualification or relegation
1	Espérance de Tunis	14	9	4	1	25	8	+17	31	Advance to Playoff
2	Étoile du Sahel	14	9	2	3	23	11	+12	29	Advance to Playoff
3	Union de Tataouine	14	4	6	4	13	15	−2	18	Advance to Playoff
4	Club Sfaxien	14	3	7	4	9	10	−1	16 (Note: Teams ranked on goal difference: Club Sfaxien –1, Stade Tunisien −3, Club Bizertin −5)	Advance to Playoff
5	Stade Tunisien	14	4	4	6	14	17	−3	16	Qualification for Playout

Source: Tunisian Football Federation
Rules for classification: 1) points; 2) head-to-head points; 3) head-to-head goal difference; 4) goal difference; 5) total goals; 6) fairplay ranking; 7) playoff.

===== Results by round =====
Round	1	2	3	4	5	6	7	8	9	10	11	12	13	14
Ground	H	H	A	H	A	H	A	A	A	H	A	H	A	H
Result	D	W	L	W	W	W	D	D	W	W	W	W	D	W

Source: Competitive matches
A = Away; H = Home; W = Win; D = Draw; L = Loss

===== Matches =====
26 October 2022 Round 2	Espérance de Tunis	2–1	Croissant Chebbien	Tunis
14:30	Sharara 4'; Elhouni 33'	Report	Boussetta 35'	Stadium: Stade Hammadi Agrebi; Referee: Amir Loussif

2 November 2022 Round 5	Club Bizertin	0–1	Espérance de Tunis	Bizerte
14:30		Report	Ben Hamida 67'	Stadium: Stade 15 Octobre; Referee: Yosri Bouali

5 November 2022 Round 6	Espérance de Tunis	3–0	Union de Tataouine	Tunis
14:30	Ben Romdhane 37', 41' (pen.); Bougrine 53'	Report		Stadium: Stade Hammadi Agrebi; Referee: Ameur Chouchane

9 November 2022 Round 7	Espoir de Hammam Sousse	0–0	Espérance de Tunis	Sousse
14:30		Report		Stadium: Stade Bou Ali Lahouar; Referee: Oussama Razgallah

10 December 2022 Round 1	Espérance de Tunis	1–1	Club Sfaxien	Tunis
14:00	Elhouni 83'	Report	Diakhité 75'	Stadium: Stade Bou Kornine; Attendance: 0 (close doors); Referee: Yosri Bouali

21 December 2022 Round 3	Stade Tunisien	2–1	Espérance de Tunis	Tunis
14:00	Jouini 11'; Khadraoui 63'	Report	Ben Romdhane 70'	Stadium: Stade Hédi Enneifer; Referee: Ameur Chouchane

12 January 2023 Round 4	Espérance de Tunis	2–0	Étoile du Sahel	Tunis
17:00	Ben Romdhane 8', 90'	Report		Stadium: Stade Hammadi Agrebi; Referee: Amin Omar (Egypt)

18 January 2023 Round 8	Club Sfaxien	1–1	Espérance de Tunis	Sfax
14:00	Ajjel 86'	Report	Badri 26'	Stadium: Stade Taïeb Mhiri; Referee: Mahmoud El Banna (Egypt)

21 January 2023 Round 9	Croissant Chebbien	0–2	Espérance de Tunis	Chebba
14:00		Report	Badri 47'; Ben Romdhane 53'	Stadium: Stade de Chebba; Referee: Majdi Belhaj Ali

25 January 2023 Round 10	Espérance de Tunis	2–0	Stade Tunisien	Tunis
14:00	Ben Romdhane 33' (pen.); Benayad 81'	Report		Stadium: Stade Hammadi Agrebi; Referee: Oussama Razgallah

30 January 2023 Round 11	Étoile du Sahel	1–2	Espérance de Tunis	Sousse
14:00	Jaziri 79'	Report	Badri 42'; Ouahabi 86'	Stadium: Stade Olympique de Sousse; Referee: Mohamed Marouf Eid Mansour (Egypt)

2 February 2023 Round 12	Espérance de Tunis	4–0	Club Bizertin	Tunis
14:00	Badri 7', 70', 75'; Bougrine 27'	Report		Stadium: Stade Hammadi Agrebi; Referee: Achref Harakati

5 February 2023 Round 13	Union de Tataouine	2–2	Espérance de Tunis	Tataouine
14:00	Diallo 74', 90+1'	Report	Bouchniba 39'; Ben Hammouda 56'	Stadium: Stade Nejib Khattab; Referee: Jalel Sahbani

8 February 2023 Round 14	Espérance de Tunis	2–0	Espoir de Hammam Sousse	Tunis
14:00	Zaddem 52'; Ben Hamida 81'	Report		Stadium: Stade Hammadi Agrebi; Referee: Mahmoud Nagy (Egypt)

==== Playoff ====
===== League table =====
Pos	Team	Pld	W	D	L	GF	GA	GD	Pts	Qualification
1	Étoile du Sahel (C)	14	9	4	1	19	3	+16	34 (Note: Étoile du Sahel and Union de Ben Guerdane were added 3 points (2nds of the groups in the first round).)	Qualification for the Champions League
2	Espérance de Tunis	14	7	3	4	20	10	+10	28 (Note: Espérance de Tunis and Union Monastirienne were added 4 points (1sts of the groups in the first round).)	Qualification for the Champions League
3	Club Africain	14	7	5	2	17	9	+8	27 (Note: Club Africain and Club Sfaxien were added 1 point (4ths of the groups in the first round).)	Qualification for the Confederation Cup
4	Union Monastirienne	14	6	4	4	23	14	+9	26	
5	Union de Ben Guerdane	14	5	3	6	18	16	+2	21	

Source: Tunisian Football Federation
Rules for classification: 1) points; 2) head-to-head points; 3) head-to-head goal difference; 4) goal difference; 5) total goals; 6) fairplay ranking; 7) playoff.
(C) Champions

===== Results by round =====
Round	1	2	3	4	5	6	7	8	9	10	11	12	13	14
Ground	A	H	A	H	A	A	H	H	A	H	A	H	H	A
Result	W	D	L	W	L	L	W	W	L	W	D	W	D	W
Position	1	2	5	3	4	5	3	3	4	3	3	2	3	2

Source: Competitive matches
A = Away; H = Home; W = Win; D = Draw; L = Loss

===== Matches =====
2 March 2023 Round 1	Union de Ben Guerdane	1–2	Espérance de Tunis	Ben Guerdane
14:30	Chaabane 30'	Report	Badri 43', 48'	Stadium: Stade du 7 Mars; Referee: Amir Loussif

9 April 2023 Round 2	Espérance de Tunis	1–1	Union Monastirienne	Tunis
13:30	Ben Romdhane 69'	Report	Chikhaoui 90+1'	Stadium: Stade Hammadi Agrebi; Referee: Mohamed Marouf Eid Mansour (Egypt)

16 April 2023 Round 3	Olympique Béja	2–0	Espérance de Tunis	Béja
13:30	Ba 6'; Saidi 87'	Report		Stadium: Stade Boujemaa Kmiti; Referee: Nidhal Letaief

25 April 2023 Round 4	Espérance de Tunis	1–0	Étoile du Sahel	Tunis
17:00	Benayad 59'	Report		Stadium: Stade Hammadi Agrebi; Referee: Mustapha Ghorbal (Algeria)

3 May 2023 Round 5	Club Sfaxien	1–0	Espérance de Tunis	Sfax
15:00	Ali 14'	Report		Stadium: Stade Taïeb Mhiri; Referee: Lotfi Bekouassa (Algeria)

7 May 2023 Round 6	Club Africain	1–0	Espérance de Tunis	Tunis
17:00	H. Labidi 81'	Report		Stadium: Stade Hammadi Agrebi; Referee: Abdel Aziz Mohamed Bouh (Mauritania)

23 May 2023 Round 7	Espérance de Tunis	3–0	Union de Tataouine	Tunis
17:00	Badri 37'; Mimouni 73'; Sharara 90+3'	Report		Stadium: Stade Hammadi Agrebi; Referee: Nidhal Letaief

1 June 2023 Round 8	Espérance de Tunis	2–0	Union de Ben Guerdane	Tunis
17:00	Badri 80'; Mimouni 86'	Report		Stadium: Stade Hammadi Agrebi; Referee: Haithem Kossai

4 June 2023 Round 9	Union Monastirienne	3–2	Espérance de Tunis	Monastir
16:30	Traoré 37', 52'; Chikhaoui 58'	Report	Ben Hammouda 29', 90+3'	Stadium: Stade Mustapha Ben Jannet; Referee: Ahmed El Ghandour (Egypt)

7 June 2023 Round 10	Espérance de Tunis	2–0	Olympique Béja	Tunis
16:30	Ben Hammouda 25'; Ben Romdhane 64'	Report		Stadium: Stade Hammadi Agrebi; Referee: Amir Loussif

10 June 2023 Round 11	Étoile du Sahel	0–0	Espérance de Tunis	Sousse
16:30		Report		Stadium: Stade Olympique de Sousse; Referee: Lahlou Benbraham (Algeria)

24 June 2023 Round 12	Espérance de Tunis	1–0	Club Sfaxien	Tunis
16:30	Ouahabi 26'	Report		Stadium: Stade Hammadi Agrebi; Referee: Lotfi Bekouassa (Algeria)

27 June 2023 Round 13	Espérance de Tunis	0–0	Club Africain	Tunis
16:30		Report		Stadium: Stade Hammadi Agrebi; Referee: Novak Simović (Serbia)

30 June 2023 Round 14	Union de Tataouine	1–6	Espérance de Tunis	Tataouine
16:30	Diallo 55'	Report	Meriah 25' (pen.), 32' (pen.), 45+1' (pen.); Ben Hammouda 51'; Berrima 60'; Bougrine 66'	Stadium: Stade Nejib Khattab; Referee: Oussama Razgallah

==== Results summary ====
Overall								Home						Away					
Pld	W	D	L	GF	GA	GD	Pts	W	D	L	GF	GA	GD	W	D	L	GF	GA	GD
28	16	7	5	45	18	+27	55	11	3	0	26	3	+23	5	4	5	19	15	+4

Source: Competitive matches

NB: As Group A winners, Espérance de Tunis were added 4 points in the playoff that were not counted in this summary.

=== Tunisian Cup ===
15 February 2023 Round of 32	Espérance de Tunis	2–1	Espoir de Djerba	Tunis
13:30	Zaddem 13'; Mimouni 55'	Report	Filali 87'	Stadium: Stade Hammadi Agrebi; Referee: Karim Khemiri

22 February 2023 Round of 16	Espérance de Tunis	4–0	Union de Ben Guerdane	Tunis
13:30	Benayad 17'; Badri 28'; Elhouni 36'; Bouchniba 45+2'	Report		Stadium: Stade Hammadi Agrebi; Referee: Sadok Selmi

5 April 2023 Quarter-finals	Espérance de Tunis	2–0	Club Bizertin	Tunis
13:30	Ben Romdhane 33'; Ben Hammouda 78'	Report		Stadium: Stade Hammadi Agrebi; Referee: Naim Hosni

13 April 2023 Semi-finals	Espérance de Tunis	3–2	Stade Tunisien	Tunis
13:30	Ben Romdhane 1'; Benayad 16'; Elhouni 27'	Report	Shili 13' (pen.), 44' (pen.)	Stadium: Stade Hammadi Agrebi; Referee: Lotfi Bekouassa (Algeria)

28 May 2023 Final	Espérance de Tunis	0–1	Olympique Béja	Tunis
16:00		Report	Bouguerra 66'	Stadium: Stade Hammadi Agrebi; Attendance: 30,000; Referee: Haythem Guirat

=== CAF Champions League ===
==== Qualifying rounds ====
The draw of the qualifying rounds was held on 9 August 2022.

===== Second round =====
9 October 2022 First leg	Plateau United (Nigeria)	2–1	(Tunisia) Espérance de Tunis	Abuja
16:00 UTC+1	Onyebuchi 35'; Mustapha 45+1'	Report	Badri 27'	Stadium: Moshood Abiola National Stadium; Referee: Daniel Nii Laryea (Ghana)

15 October 2022 Second leg	Espérance de Tunis (Tunisia)	1–0 (2 (a) –2 agg.)	(Nigeria) Plateau United	Tunis
17:00 UTC+1	Ben Romdhane 83' (pen.)	Report		Stadium: Stade Hammadi Agrebi; Referee: Ibrahim Nour El Din (Egypt)

==== Group stage ====
The draw of the group stage was held on 12 December 2022.

Group D

Pos	Team	Pld	W	D	L	GF	GA	GD	Pts	Qualification	EST	CRB	ZSC	MSC
1	(Tunisia) Espérance de Tunis	6	3	2	1	6	4	+2	11	Advance to knockout stage	—	0–0	2–0	1–0
2	(Algeria) CR Belouizdad	6	3	1	2	4	2	+2	10	Advance to knockout stage	0–1	—	2–0	1–0
3	(Egypt) Zamalek	6	2	1	3	7	9	−2	7		3–1	0–1	—	4–3
4	(Sudan) Al Merrikh	6	1	2	3	5	7	−2	5		1–1	1–0	0–0	—

Source: CAF

11 February 2023 Matchday 1	Espérance de Tunis (Tunisia)	1–0	(Sudan) Al Merrikh	Tunis
17:00 UTC+1	Tougai 90+4'	Report		Stadium: Stade Hammadi Agrebi; Referee: Ibrahim Kalilou Traore (Ivory Coast)

18 February 2023 Matchday 2	CR Belouizdad (Algeria)	0–1	(Tunisia) Espérance de Tunis	Algiers
20:00 UTC+1		Report	Elhouni 80'	Stadium: Stade du 5 Juillet; Referee: Abongile Tom (South Africa)

25 February 2023 Matchday 3	Espérance de Tunis (Tunisia)	2–0	(Egypt) Zamalek	Tunis
17:00 UTC+1	Ben Hammouda 35'; Ben Romdhane 90+2'	Report		Stadium: Stade Hammadi Agrebi; Referee: Redouane Jiyed (Morocco)

7 March 2023 Matchday 4	Zamalek (Egypt)	3–1	(Tunisia) Espérance de Tunis	Alexandria
21:00 UTC+2	Gaafar 9'; Zizo 29'; Jaziri 90+1'	Report	Benayad 57'	Stadium: Borg El Arab Stadium; Referee: Blaise Yuven Ngwa (Cameroon)

17 March 2023 Matchday 5	Al Merrikh (Sudan)	1–1	(Tunisia) Espérance de Tunis	Benghazi (Libya) (Note: Al Merrikh played their group stage home matches at Benina Martyrs Stadium, Benghazi (Libya), instead of their regular home stadium Al Merrikh Stadium, Omdurman, which did not meet CAF requirements.)
15:00 UTC+2	Sérgio 90' (pen.)	Report	Ben Hammouda 23'	Stadium: Benina Martyrs Stadium; Referee: Ahmad Imtehaz Heeralall (Mauritius)

1 April 2023 Matchday 6	Espérance de Tunis (Tunisia)	0–0	(Algeria) CR Belouizdad	Tunis
23:00 UTC+1		Report		Stadium: Stade Hammadi Agrebi; Referee: Pierre Atcho (Gabon)

==== Knockout stage ====
The draw for the knockout stage was held on 5 April 2023.

===== Quarter-finals =====
21 April 2023 First leg	JS Kabylie (Algeria)	0–1	(Tunisia) Espérance de Tunis	Algiers (Note: JS Kabylie played their knockout stage home matches at Stade du 5 Juillet, Algiers, instead of their regular home stadium 1 November 1954 Stadium, Tizi Ouzou, which did not meet CAF requirements.)
22:00 UTC+1		Report	Ben Hammouda 54'	Stadium: Stade du 5 Juillet; Attendance: 47,000; Referee: Amin Omar (Egypt)

29 April 2023 Second leg	Espérance de Tunis (Tunisia)	1–1 (2–1 agg.)	(Algeria) JS Kabylie	Tunis
20:00 UTC+1	Ben Romdhane 49'	Report	Redjem 85'	Stadium: Stade Hammadi Agrebi; Attendance: 40,000; Referee: Jean Jacques Ndala Ngambo (DR Congo)

===== Semi-finals =====
12 May 2023 First leg	Espérance de Tunis (Tunisia)	0–3	(Egypt) Al Ahly	Tunis
20:00 UTC+1		Report	Tau 8', 55'; Kahraba 75'	Stadium: Stade Hammadi Agrebi; Attendance: 0 (close doors); Referee: Peter Waweru (Kenya)

19 May 2023 Second leg	Al Ahly (Egypt)	1–0 (4–0 agg.)	(Tunisia) Espérance de Tunis	Cairo
22:00 UTC+3	El Shahat 22'	Report		Stadium: Cairo International Stadium; Attendance: 10,000; Referee: Dahane Beida (Mauritania)

== Statistics ==
=== Playing statistics ===
No.	Pos	Nat	Player	Total		Ligue 1		Tunisian Cup		CAF Champions League	
No.	Pos	Nat	Player	Apps	Goals	Apps	Goals	Apps	Goals	Apps	Goals
1	GK	(Tunisia) TUN	Mohamed Sedki Debchi	24	0	15	0	5	0	4	0
2	DF	(Tunisia) TUN	Mohamed Ben Ali	23	0	14	0	1	0	8	0
3	FW	(Tunisia) TUN	Rached Arfaoui	14	0	6	0	4	0	4	0
4	DF	(Algeria) ALG	Mohamed Amine Tougai	33	1	18	0	3	0	12	1
5	MF	(Tunisia) TUN	Mohamed Ali Ben Romdhane	38	14	24	9	3	2	11	3
6	DF	(Tunisia) TUN	Mohamed Ali Yacoubi	11	0	5	0	3	0	3	0
7	FW	(Jordan) JOR	Sharara	7	2	6	2	0	0	1	0
8	FW	(Tunisia) TUN	Anice Badri	27	12	15	10	4	1	8	1
9	FW	(Algeria) ALG	Riad Benayad	27	5	15	2	3	2	9	1
10	FW	(Libya) LBA	Hamdou Elhouni	35	5	23	2	3	2	9	1
11	MF	(Morocco) MAR	Sabir Bougrine	35	3	21	3	4	0	10	0
12	GK	(Tunisia) TUN	Moez Ben Cherifia	18	0	10	0	0	0	8	0
13	DF	(Tunisia) TUN	Amenallah Majhed	0	0	0	0	0	0	0	0
14	FW	(Tunisia) TUN	Rayen Hamrouni	6	0	2	0	3	0	1	0
15	MF	(Ivory Coast) CIV	Fousseny Coulibaly	36	0	21	0	4	0	11	0
16	GK	(Tunisia) TUN	Hamza Ghanmi	0	0	0	0	0	0	0	0
17	FW	(Tunisia) TUN	Zied Berrima	8	1	7	1	1	0	0	0
18	MF	(Tunisia) TUN	Malek Mehri	19	0	13	0	1	0	5	0
19	MF	(Tunisia) TUN	Mootez Zaddem	31	2	18	1	4	1	9	0
20	DF	(Tunisia) TUN	Mohamed Amine Ben Hamida	42	2	27	2	4	0	11	0
21	FW	(Tunisia) TUN	Aziz Abid	24	0	18	0	2	0	4	0
22	DF	(Tunisia) TUN	Hani Amamou	15	0	9	0	2	0	4	0
23	MF	(Tunisia) TUN	Ghaith Ouahabi	18	2	14	2	0	0	4	0
24	DF	(Tunisia) TUN	Yassine Meriah	39	3	23	3	4	0	12	0
25	MF	(Tunisia) TUN	Ghailene Chaalali	12	0	5	0	1	0	6	0
26	GK	(Tunisia) TUN	Amenallah Memmiche	5	0	5	0	0	0	0	0
27	FW	(Tunisia) TUN	Mohamed Ali Ben Hammouda	42	9	25	5	5	1	12	3
28	MF	(Tunisia) TUN	Aziz Fellah	1	0	0	0	1	0	0	0
29	DF	(Tunisia) TUN	Zied Machmoum	7	0	5	0	0	0	2	0
30	DF	(Tunisia) TUN	Houssem Dagdoug	13	0	8	0	2	0	3	0
31	MF	(Tunisia) TUN	Zakaria El Ayeb	9	0	8	0	1	0	0	0
32	DF	(Tunisia) TUN	Raed Fedaa	14	0	12	0	0	0	2	0
33	FW	(Tunisia) TUN	Farouk Mimouni	7	3	4	2	1	1	2	0
35	DF	(Tunisia) TUN	Zinedine Sassi	1	0	1	0	0	0	0	0
36	DF	(Tunisia) TUN	Raed Bouchniba	35	2	25	1	3	1	7	0
38	GK	(Tunisia) TUN	Wassim Karoui	0	0	0	0	0	0	0	0
	DF	(Tunisia) TUN	Wael Chaieb^{y}	1	0	0	0	1	0	0	0
	DF	(Tunisia) TUN	Bilel Chabbar^{‡}	1	0	1	0	0	0	0	0

Source: TarajiZone

- ^{‡} Player left the club during the season
- ^{y} Youth team

=== Goals ===
Rank	Player	Ligue 1	Tunisian Cup	CAF Champions League	Total
1	(Tunisia) Mohamed Ali Ben Romdhane	9	2	3	14
2	(Tunisia) Anice Badri	10	1	1	12
3	(Tunisia) Mohamed Ali Ben Hammouda	5	1	3	9
4	(Libya) Hamdou Elhouni	2	2	1	5
4	(Algeria) Riad Benayad	2	2	1	5
6	(Tunisia) Farouk Mimouni	2	1	0	3
6	(Tunisia) Yassine Meriah	3	0	0	3
6	(Morocco) Sabir Bougrine	2	0	0	3
9	(Tunisia) Mohamed Amine Ben Hamida	2	0	0	2
9	(Tunisia) Mootez Zaddem	1	1	0	2
9	(Tunisia) Raed Bouchniba	1	1	0	2
9	(Jordan) Sharara	2	0	0	2
9	(Tunisia) Ghaith Ouahabi	2	0	0	2
14	(Algeria) Mohamed Amine Tougai	0	0	1	1
14	(Tunisia) Zied Berrima	1	0	0	1
Total		45	11	10	66

=== Assists ===
Rank	Player	Ligue 1	Tunisian Cup	CAF Champions League	Total
1	(Libya) Hamdou Elhouni	7	1	3	11
2	(Morocco) Sabir Bougrine	3	1	0	4
3	(Tunisia) Rached Arfaoui	3	0	0	3
3	(Tunisia) Mohamed Ali Ben Hammouda	2	0	1	3
5	(Tunisia) Houssem Dagdoug	1	1	0	2
5	(Algeria) Riad Benayad	1	1	0	2
5	(Tunisia) Raed Bouchniba	0	2	0	2
5	(Tunisia) Yassine Meriah	1	0	1	2
5	(Tunisia) Mohamed Ali Ben Romdhane	2	0	0	2
5	(Tunisia) Zied Berrima	2	0	0	2
11	(Tunisia) Mootez Zaddem	1	0	0	1
11	(Tunisia) Raed Fedaa	1	0	0	1
11	(Tunisia) Zied Machmoum	1	0	0	1
11	(Tunisia) Mohamed Amine Ben Hamida	1	0	0	1
11	(Tunisia) Ghailene Chaalali	0	0	1	1
11	(Tunisia) Anice Badri	0	1	0	1
11	(Tunisia) Farouk Mimouni	1	0	0	1
11	(Tunisia) Mohamed Ben Ali	1	0	0	1
Total		26	7	6	39

=== Cleansheets ===
Rank	Player	Ligue 1	Tunisian Cup	CAF Champions League	Total
1	(Tunisia) Mohamed Sedki Debchi	7	2	2	11
2	(Tunisia) Moez Ben Cherifia	6	0	4	10
3	(Tunisia) Amenallah Memmiche	4	0	0	4
Total		17	2	6	25

=== Disciplinary record ===
N	P	Nat.	Name	Ligue 1			Tunisian Cup			CAF Champions League			Total			Notes
N	P	Nat.	Name	Yellow card	Second yellow card	Red card	Yellow card	Second yellow card	Red card	Yellow card	Second yellow card	Red card	Yellow card	Second yellow card	Red card	Notes
15	MF	(Ivory Coast)	Fousseny Coulibaly	6		1	1			2			9		1	
24	DF	(Tunisia)	Yassine Meriah	4		1	1			3			8		1	
19	MF	(Tunisia)	Mootez Zaddem	3		1				2			5		1	
4	DF	(Algeria)	Mohamed Amine Tougai	2	1					3			5	1		
27	FW	(Tunisia)	Mohamed Ali Ben Hammouda	2	1		1			1			4	1		
36	DF	(Tunisia)	Raed Bouchniba	1							1		1	1		
5	MF	(Tunisia)	Mohamed Ali Ben Romdhane	6			1			1			8			
23	MF	(Tunisia)	Ghaith Ouahabi	5						2			7			
25	MF	(Tunisia)	Ghailene Chaalali	3						2			5			
20	DF	(Tunisia)	Mohamed Amine Ben Hamida	2						2			4			
30	DF	(Tunisia)	Houssem Dagdoug	1			1			1			3			
2	DF	(Tunisia)	Mohamed Ben Ali	1						2			3			
10	FW	(Libya)	Hamdou Elhouni	1						1			2			
3	FW	(Tunisia)	Rached Arfaoui				1			1			2			
11	MF	(Morocco)	Sabir Bougrine	2									2			
6	DF	(Tunisia)	Mohamed Ali Yacoubi	1						1			2			
18	MF	(Tunisia)	Malek Mehri	1									1			
8	FW	(Tunisia)	Anice Badri	1									1			
1	GK	(Tunisia)	Mohamed Sedki Debchi				1						1			
12	GK	(Tunisia)	Moez Ben Cherifia							1			1			
17	FW	(Tunisia)	Zied Berrima	1									1			
31	MF	(Tunisia)	Zakaria El Ayeb	1									1			

Source: TarajiZone
Only competitive matches
(yellow card) = Number of bookings; (second yellow card) = Number of sending offs after a second yellow card; (red card) = Number of sending offs by a direct red card.
