= Russian Orthodox Church (disambiguation) =

The Russian Orthodox Church is an autocephalous Eastern Orthodox Christian church.

Russian Orthodox Church may also refer to the following buildings:

- Russian Orthodox Church of Saint Nicholas, Bari, Italy
- Russian Orthodox Church of the Resurrection, Montevideo, Uruguay
- Russian Orthodox Church in Rabat, Morocco
- Russian Orthodox Church, Sharjah, United Arab Emirates
- Russian Orthodox Church, Tunis, Tunisia
- Russian Orthodox Church, Vevey, Switzerland

== See also ==
- Russian Orthodox Church Outside of Russia#Notable churches
