= 2023–24 Tala'ea El Gaish SC season =

Tala'ea El Gaish SC
2023–24 season
- Manager: Abdel Hamid Bassiouny
- Stadium: Gehaz El Reyada Stadium
- Egyptian Premier League: 10th
- Egypt Cup: Quarter-finals
- League Cup: Runners-up
- Top goalscorer: Godwin Chika (5)

The 2023–24 Tala'ea El Gaish SC season was the club's 27th season in existence and the 20th consecutive season in the top flight of Egyptian football. In addition to the domestic league, Tala'ea El Gaish participated in this season's editions of the Egypt Cup, and the League Cup.

== Players ==
=== First-team squad ===
As of 15 September 2023

Note: Flags indicate national team as defined under FIFA eligibility rules; some limited exceptions apply. Players may hold more than one non-FIFA nationality.

No.	Pos.	Nation	Player
—	GK	(Egypt) EGY	Mohamed Shaaban
—	DF	(Egypt) EGY	Ahmed Meteb
—	DF	(Tunisia) TUN	Houssem Dagdoug
—	DF	(Egypt) EGY	Amro Tarek
—	DF	(Egypt) EGY	Mohamed Samir Saad
—	DF	(Egypt) EGY	Mohamed Fathallah
—	DF	(Egypt) EGY	Mohamed Diab
—	MF	(Egypt) EGY	Karim Halawa
—	MF	(Tanzania) TAN	Himid Mao
—	MF	(Egypt) EGY	Mostafa El Khawaga
—	MF	(Egypt) EGY	Omar Tariq Al Saeed
—	MF	(Egypt) EGY	Karim Tarek
—	MF	(Egypt) EGY	Yousry Waheed
—	MF	(Egypt) EGY	Mohamed Hamdy Zaky

No.	Pos.	Nation	Player
—	MF	(Egypt) EGY	Yahya Hamed
—	MF	(Egypt) EGY	Ahmed Abdel Rahman Zola
—	MF	(Egypt) EGY	Islam Mohareb
—	MF	(Egypt) EGY	El Sayed Abo Amna
—	FW	(Egypt) EGY	Ahmed El Sheikh
—	FW	(Guinea) GUI	Moussa Diawara
—	FW	(Nigeria) NGA	Godwin Chika
—		(Egypt) EGY	Ahmed Samir
—		(Egypt) EGY	Omar Radwan
—		(Egypt) EGY	Mohamed Shehata
—		(Egypt) EGY	Imad Al-Sayed
—		(Egypt) EGY	Ali Al-Zahdi
—		(Egypt) EGY	Mohamed Hani
—		(Egypt) EGY	Jalal Al-Sharqawi

== Transfers ==
=== In ===
Pos.	Player	Transferred from	Fee	Date	Source
DF	(Egypt) Ahmed Meteb	(Egypt) Eastern Company		17 July 2023	
MF	(Egypt) Karim Halawa	(Egypt) Misr Lel Makkasa		17 July 2023	
FW	(Egypt) Ahmed El Sheikh	(Egypt) Ghazl El Mahalla	Free	22 July 2023	
MF	(Tanzania) Himid Mao	(Egypt) Ghazl El Mahalla	Free	22 July 2023	
FW	(Guinea) Moussa Diawara	(Egypt) National Bank	Free	30 July 2023	
MF	(Egypt) Mostafa El Khawaga	(Egypt) Smouha		6 August 2023	
MF	(Egypt) Omar Tariq Al Saeed	(Egypt) Tersana		6 August 2023	
MF	(Egypt) Karim Tarek	(Egypt) El Gouna		7 August 2023	
MF	(Egypt) Yousry Waheed	(Egypt) Tersana	Loan	9 August 2023	
DF	(Tunisia) Houssem Dagdoug	(Tunisia) ES Tunis	Free	9 September 2023	
FW	(Nigeria) Godwin Chika	(Libya) Al Ta'awon	Free	9 September 2023	
MF	(Egypt) Mohamed Hamdy Zaky	(Egypt) Aswan	Loan	14 September 2023	
DF	(Egypt) Amr Tarek	(United States) New York Red Bulls	Free	14 September 2023	

=== Out ===
Pos.	Player	Transferred to	Fee	Date	Source

== Pre-season and friendlies ==
Win Draw Loss

== Competitions ==
=== Overall record ===
Competition	First match	Last match	Starting round	Final position	Record							
Competition	First match	Last match	Starting round	Final position	Pld	W	D	L	GF	GA	GD	Win %
Egyptian Premier League	18 September 2023	14 August 2024	Matchday 1	10th	34	10	12	12	30	40	−10	29.41
2023–24 Egypt Cup	29 May 2024	24 August 2024	Round of 32	Quarter-finals	3	1	2	0	3	2	+1	33.33
League Cup	9 January 2024	7 August 2024	Group stage	Runners-up	6	2	3	1	7	7	+0	33.33
Total					43	13	17	13	40	49	−9	30.23

Source: Competitions

=== Egyptian Premier League ===
==== League table ====
Pos	Team	Pld	W	D	L	GF	GA	GD	Pts
8	Ceramica Cleopatra	34	12	10	12	51	42	+9	46
9	ENPPI	34	11	12	11	38	37	+1	45
10	Tala'ea El Gaish	34	10	12	12	30	40	−10	42
11	Al Ittihad	34	9	14	11	30	42	−12	41
12	El Gouna	34	9	12	13	32	44	−12	39

Source: Soccerway
Rules for classification: 1) Points; 2) Head-to-head points; 3) Head-to-head goal difference; 4) Goal difference; 5) Goals scored; 6) Play-off tie.
(Note: Head-to-head records are used for final standings only)

==== Results summary ====
Overall								Home						Away					
Pld	W	D	L	GF	GA	GD	Pts	W	D	L	GF	GA	GD	W	D	L	GF	GA	GD
34	10	12	12	30	40	−10	42	5	6	6	14	21	−7	5	6	6	16	19	−3

==== Results by round ====
Round	1
Ground	H
Result	W
Position	2

A = Away; H = Home; W = Win; D = Draw; L = Loss; P = Postponed

==== Matches ====
The league fixtures were unveiled on 11 September 2023.

18 September 2023 1	Tala'ea El Gaish	2–0	National Bank

27 September 2023 2	ENPPI	0–0	Tala'ea El Gaish

7 October 2023 3	Tala'ea El Gaish	0–2	Modern Future

20 October 2023 4	Al Masry	1–0	Tala'ea El Gaish

29 October 2023 5	Tala'ea El Gaish	1–0	Ceramica Cleopatra

5 November 2023 6	Ismaily	2–3	Tala'ea El Gaish

30 November 2023 7	Tala'ea El Gaish	1–1	El Gouna

5 December 2023 8	Baladiyat El Mahalla	0–2	Tala'ea El Gaish

15 December 2023 9	Tala'ea El Gaish	1–2	Al Mokawloon Al Arab

27 December 2023 10	Smouha	1–0	Tala'ea El Gaish

30 December 2023 11	Tala'ea El Gaish	1–0	ZED

14 February 2024 12	Al Ittihad	2–2	Tala'ea El Gaish

25 February 2024 14	Pharco	1–1	Tala'ea El Gaish

5 March 2024 15	Tala'ea El Gaish	0–0	El Dakhleya

5 April 2024 17	Pyramids	0–0	Tala'ea El Gaish

17 April 2024 18	National Bank	0–1	Tala'ea El Gaish

24 April 2024 19	Tala'ea El Gaish	1–0	ENPPI

2 May 2024 20	Modern Future	0–0	Tala'ea El Gaish

6 May 2024 21	Tala'ea El Gaish	0–2	Al Masry

10 May 2024 22	Ceramica Cleopatra	2–1	Tala'ea El Gaish

14 May 2024 23	Tala'ea El Gaish	1–1	Ismaily

21 May 2024 24	El Gouna	0–0	Tala'ea El Gaish

26 May 2024 25	Tala'ea El Gaish	1–0	Baladiyat El Mahalla

16 June 2024 26	Al Mokawloon Al Arab	3–1	Tala'ea El Gaish

22 June 2024 27	Tala'ea El Gaish	2–2	Smouha

27 June 2024 28	ZED	4–1	Tala'ea El Gaish

1 July 2024 13	Tala'ea El Gaish	0–4	Al Ahly

4 July 2024 29	Tala'ea El Gaish	0–0	Al Ittihad

8 July 2024 30	Al Ahly	2–0	Tala'ea El Gaish

11 July 2024 16	Tala'ea El Gaish	1–2	Zamalek

20 July 2024 31	Tala'ea El Gaish	0–0	Pharco

30 July 2024 32	El Dakhleya	0–1	Tala'ea El Gaish

11 August 2024 34	Tala'ea El Gaish	2–5	Pyramids

14 August 2024 33	Zamalek	1–3	Tala'ea El Gaish

=== Egypt Cup ===
29 May 2024 Round of 32	Tala'ea El Gaish	1–0	Bur Fouad

21 August 2024 Round of 16	Zamalek	1–1 (3–5 p)	Tala'ea El Gaish

24 August 2024 Quarter-finals	Tala'ea El Gaish	1–1 (9–10 p)	Ismaily

=== League Cup ===
==== Group stage ====
9 January 2024 1	ZED	0–1	Tala'ea El Gaish	Cairo
15:00		Report	Wahid 71'	Stadium: Cairo International Stadium; Referee: Atef Hussein

16 January 2024 2	Tala'ea El Gaish	2–2	Pyramids	Cairo
17:00	Joules 34'; Wahid 85'	Report	Tolulope 45+3'; A. Tarek 68' (o.g.)	Stadium: Gehaz El Reyada Stadium; Referee: Mahmoud Nagy

26 January 2024 3	Pharco	0–1	Tala'ea El Gaish	Alexandria
19:00		Report	Wahid 50'	Stadium: Haras El Hodoud Stadium; Referee: Mohamed Youssef

==== Knockout stage ====
31 January 2024 Quarter-finals	Tala'ea El Gaish	1–1 (6–5 p)	El Gouna	Cairo
16:30	Abdel Rahman 27'	Report	Magdy 70'	Stadium: Gehaz El Reyada Stadium; Referee: Mohamed El Ghazi
	Penalties
	Okwara (penalty scored); Meteb (penalty scored); Samir (penalty missed); Wahid (penalty scored); Abdel Rahman (penalty scored); Diawara (penalty scored); Hany (penalty scored)		(penalty scored) Shousha; (penalty scored) Randrianantenaina; (penalty scored) Mahmoud; (penalty missed) Emad; (penalty scored) Abdel Rasoul; (penalty scored) Etouga; (penalty missed) El Deghemy

6 February 2024 Semi-finals	Tala'ea El Gaish	1–1 (3–1 p)	Al Masry	Alexandria (Note: The match was played at Borg El Arab Stadium, Alexandria, instead of Gehaz El Reyada Stadium, Cairo, due to security concerns.)
16:30	Okwara 14'	Report	Mohsen 73'	Stadium: Borg El Arab Stadium; Referee: Abdel Aziz El Sayed
	Penalties
	Wahid (penalty scored); Meteb (penalty scored); Stouhi (penalty missed); Abdel Rahman (penalty scored)		(penalty missed) El Mohamady; (penalty scored) Gaber; (penalty missed) Mohsen; (penalty missed) Guenaoui

7 August 2024 Final	Ceramica Cleopatra	3–1	Tala'ea El Gaish	Cairo
21:00 UTC+2				Stadium: 30 June Stadium; Referee: Radu Petrescu (Romania)
