= Pasteur Square =

Square in Tunis, Tunisia

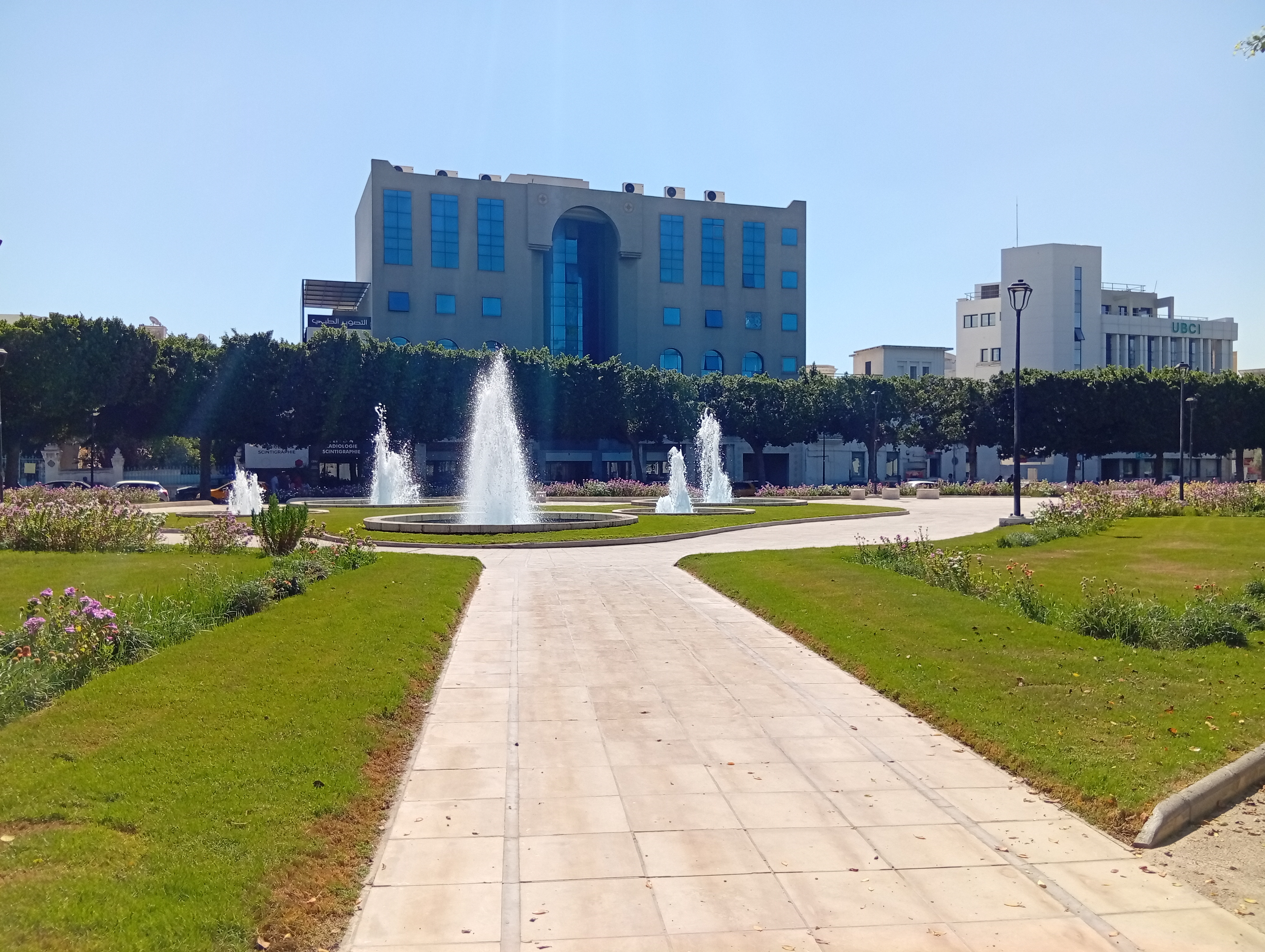
- Pasteur Square in 2025.
- Interactive map of Pasteur Square
- Native name: ساحة باستور
- Type: Town square
- Location: Tunis, Tunisia

The Pasteur Square is a square in Tunis, the capital city of Tunisia. The Pasteur Square is located at the intersection of Mohammed V Avenue, Alain Savary Avenue, Doctor-Conseil Street, Charles-Nicolle Avenue, Jugurtha Avenue, Taieb-Mehiri Avenue and Liberté Avenue. It is served by the Palestine metro station. The name of the street refers to Louis Pasteur, a French scientist, chemist and physicist who invented vaccination against rabies and anthrax.

In 15 February 2024, the square was rehabilitated by order of president of the republic, Kais Saied, in parallel with the rehabilitation of the Belvédère Municipal Swimming Pool.
