= Belvédère Municipal Swimming Pool =

Swimming pool in Tunis, Tunisia

- المسبح البلدي بالبلفيدير
- Interactive map of Belvédère Municipal Swimming Pool
- Location: 1002 Avenue Charles-Nicolle; Tunis, Tunisia
- Coordinates: 36°49′20″N 10°10′40″E
- Type: Swimming pool
- Opening date: 1930s
- Owner: Municipality of Tunis

The Belvédère Municipal Swimming Pool, also known as the Belvédère Swimming Pool, is a swimming pool in the city of Tunis, Tunisia. Built in the 1930s, it was the first swimming pool in Tunisia before being replaced by those of El Menzah and Gorjani. Closed by the Tunis City Council in 2004, the complex hosted swimming and water polo competitions, boxing matches, and musical and artistic evenings. On 15 February 2024, the president of the republic, Kais Saied, visited the swimming pool and ordered its rehabilitation and rehabilitation next to Pasteur Square with the General Administration of Military Engineering. On 21 October 2024, Saied opened the pool after comprehensive preparation.

== See also ==
- Pasteur Square
