= Hassen Belkhodja =

Tunisian politician and businessman

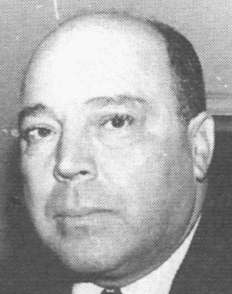
Hassen Belkhodja

Hassen Belkhodja (10 March 1916, Ras Jebel – 29 November 1981), also known as Hassan Belkhodja, was a Tunisian politician and businessman. The Hassen Belkhodja Training Center in Tunis is named after him.

== Biography ==
Belkhodja attended the Lycée Carnot de Tunis before going to study at the faculté de droit de Paris where he obtained his licence, and subsequently obtained his doctorate in 1950.

In his youth, he took part in the militant Tunisian national movement. He was a member of the Néo-Destour delegation to Paris and president of the Association des étudiants nord-africains de France, which led to him being part of the Tunisian delegation in Tuniso-French negotiations from 1954 and then represented his country as ambassador in Paris, and then, from 1957, in Madrid.

In 1959, he left diplomacy for the business world. He was founder and PDG of the Banque nationale de Tunisie, founder of the Société tunisienne de l'industrie laitière, PDG of the Société nationale immobilière de Tunisie then the Office of Commerce, founder of Nestlé Tunisie before becoming in 1971 the head of the Société Tunisienne de Banque (STB).

This career was interspersed with his ministerial responsibilities: he became minister for industry and commerce on September 8, 1969, of agriculture on September 25, 1974, of transport and telecommunication on November 7, 1979, and of Minister of Foreign Affairs of Tunisia on April 15, 1980. In 1981, a few months before his death, he left the government and returned to the presidency of the STB. In 1971, he became president of the football club Espérance Sportive de Tunis, a position he held until his death.

Married with four children, Belkhodja was elected to the political bureau of the Socialist Destourian Party in 1964, and became an MP in 1971. He was promoted in 1974 to ambassador of Tunisia. He was also decorated with the grand cordon of the order of Independence and the grand cordon of the order of the Republic.

Preceded by Mohamed Fitouri	Foreign minister of Tunisia; 1980-1981	Succeeded by Béji Caïd Essebsi
