= Espérance de Tunis Training Center =

Sports venue in Tunisia

- Parc B
- Interactive map of Espérance de Tunis Training Center
- Location: Avenue Mohammed V, Tunis
- Coordinates: 36°48′51″N 10°11′12″E
- Owner: Espérance de Tunis
- Type: Training ground / Sports complex

Construction
- Built: 1997–2000

Tenants
- Espérance de Tunis (1997–present); Espérance de Tunis Handball (2000–present); Espérance de Tunis Volleyball (2000–present)

Website
- e-s-tunis.com

The Espérance de Tunis Training Center also called Hassen Belkhodja Training Center named after former Espérance Sportive de Tunis president Hassen Belkhodja The center also is famous for its name as "Park B" it is a social center and training center, located in the heart of the city of Tunis between Avenue Mohammed V and the banks of the Tunis Lake and covers an area of 7 hectares. It has been home to Esperance's training center for about thirty years. During the 90s, the head office of Esperance, which was located in the Bab Souika district, was transferred there. Since then, new infrastructures adapted to the requirements of modern football have been built. A building houses, the General Management, the Administrative and Financial Services, the Press Department, the Ticketing and Subscription Department, the Sponsoring and Advertising Department, the Trophy Room, the Meeting Room as well as the Equipment Store. The Hassèn Belkhodja Park is made up of several integrated units.

== The Hotel ==
The Espérance Sportive de Tunis Hotel also called Hotel du Parck is a three star hotel, it was acquired back in 1977, located in downtown Tunis close to Avenue Mohammed V which has a direct access to the Tunis-Carthage Airport. Several Tunisian and foreign sports teams customarily choose it for their stay in Tunis, in this way, they take advantage of its close sport facilities for the Training of their players' well-being. In case of need, the hotel receives the Esperance players when they hole up for recuperation. The Hotel du Parc hosts the club training center with its 40-bed capacity. It is also in charge of the Esperance's superb pullman which transfers the residents upon request.

== Salle Omnisport Mohamed Zouaoui ==
The Salle Omnisport Mohamed Zouaoui named after former Espérance de Tunis president Mohamed Zouaoui, is a multisport hall opened in the year of 2000 it has 1,500 seating capacity used especially for indoor sports like Handball, Volleyball it hosts all Espérance de Tunis Handball and Espérance Sportive de Tunis Volleyball games as well it hosts many other individual sports like Boxing, Wrestling and taekwondo. The Multi-sports hall has also hosted many Continental handball competitions like the African Handball Champions League and also many volleyball competitions like the African Volleyball Club Championship. The Club Administration used sometimes for the club elections, and for supporters celebration.

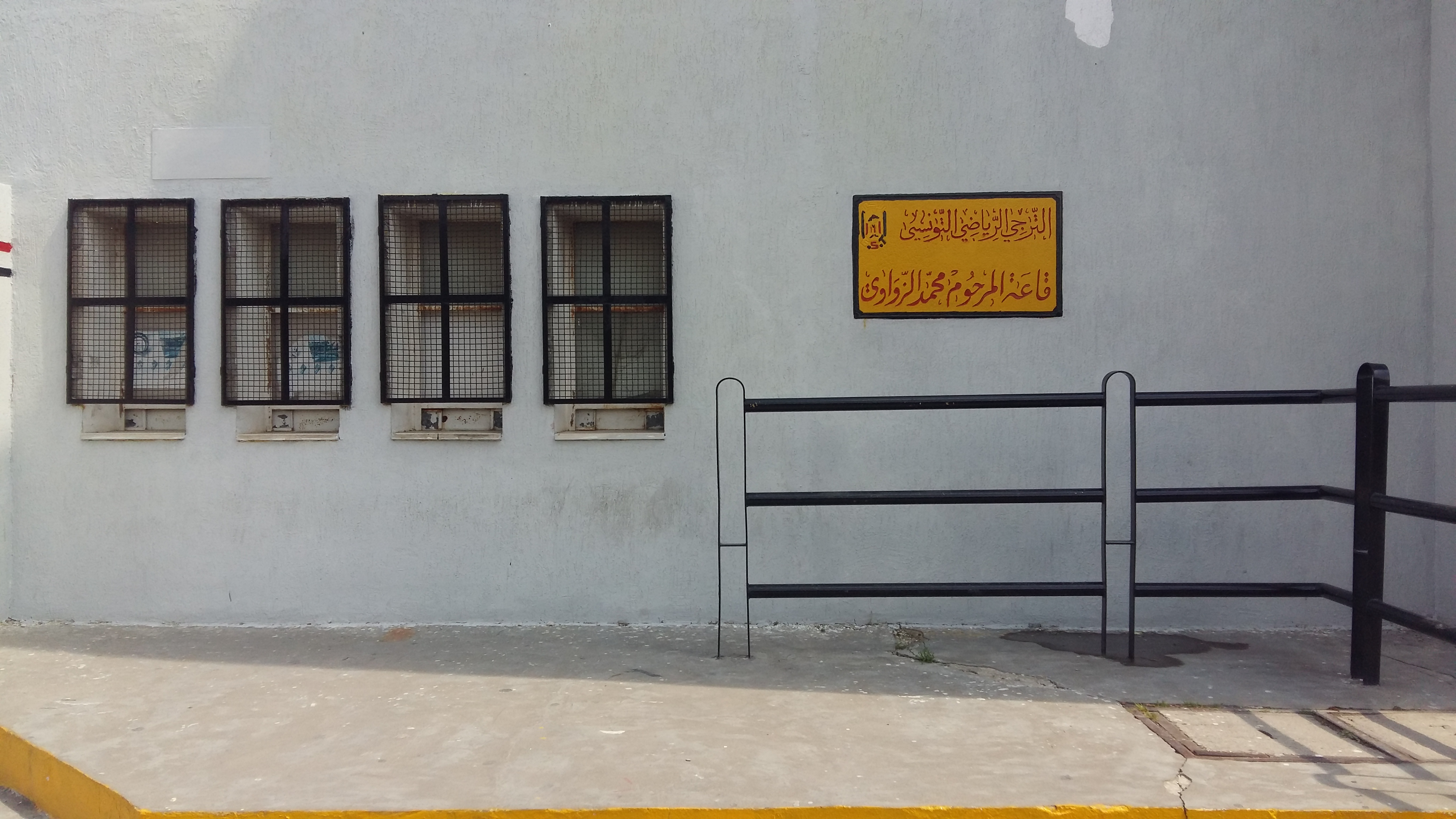
Exterior Views of the Hall

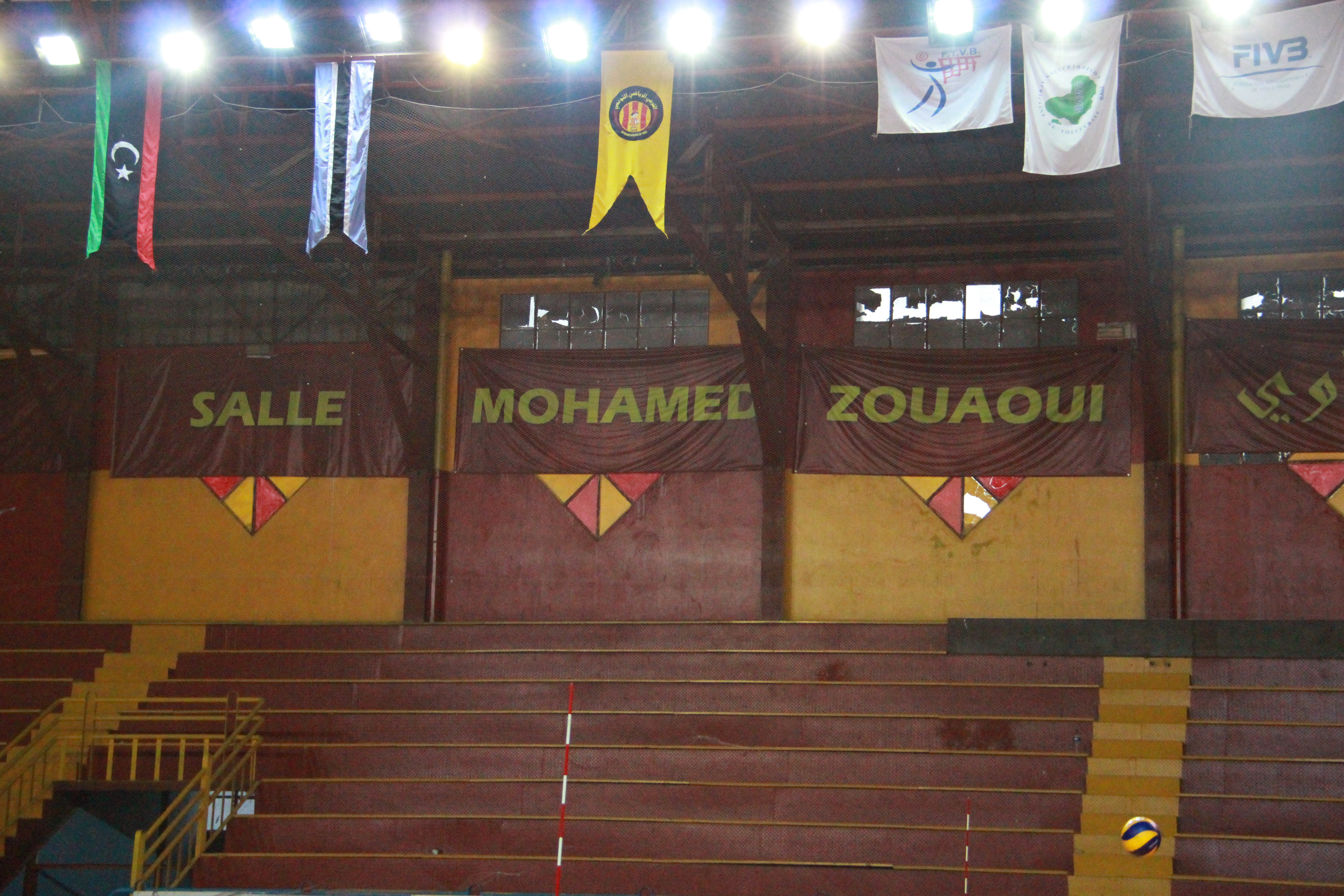
Views of Blank Stands

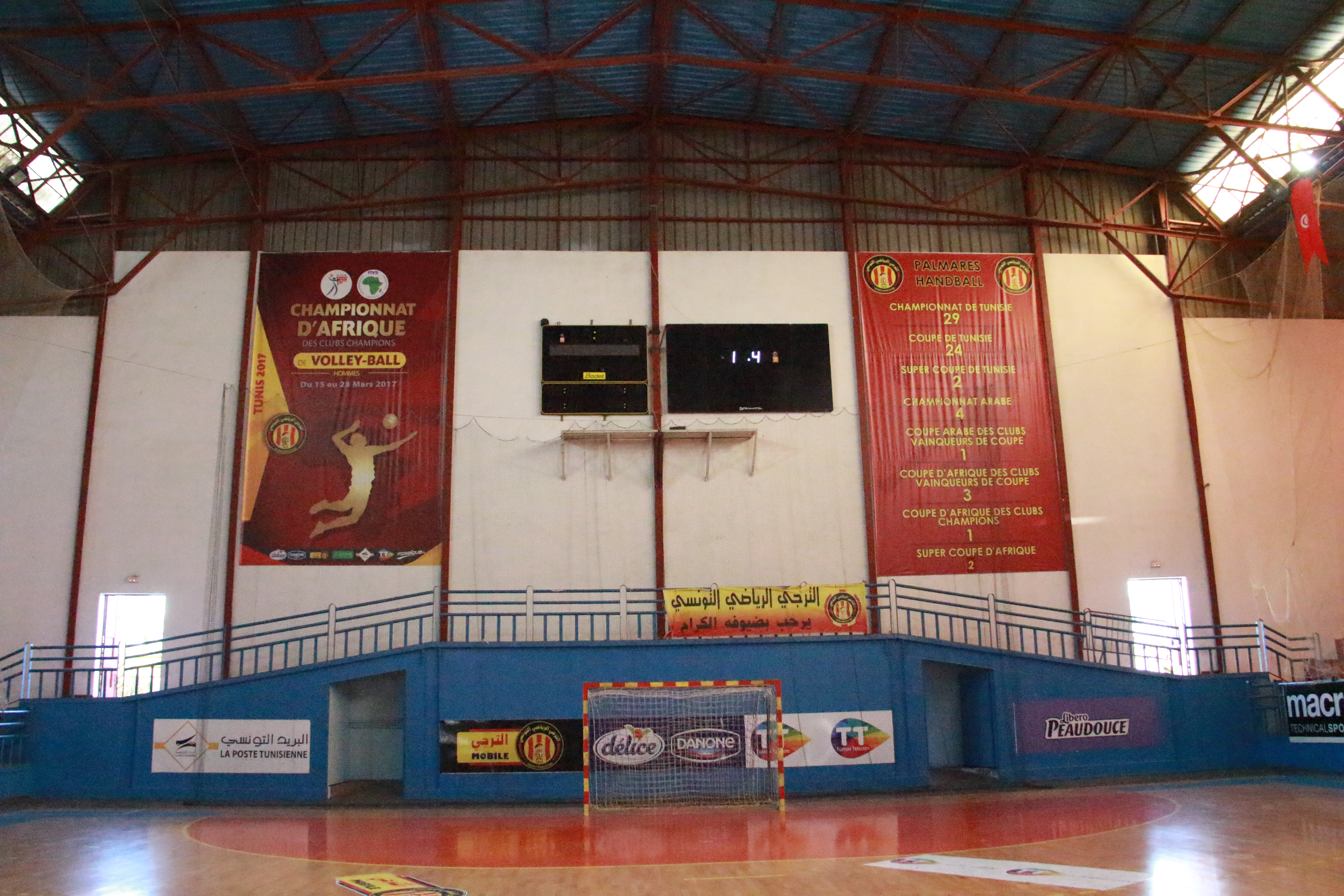
Views of the Inside Multi-sports hall

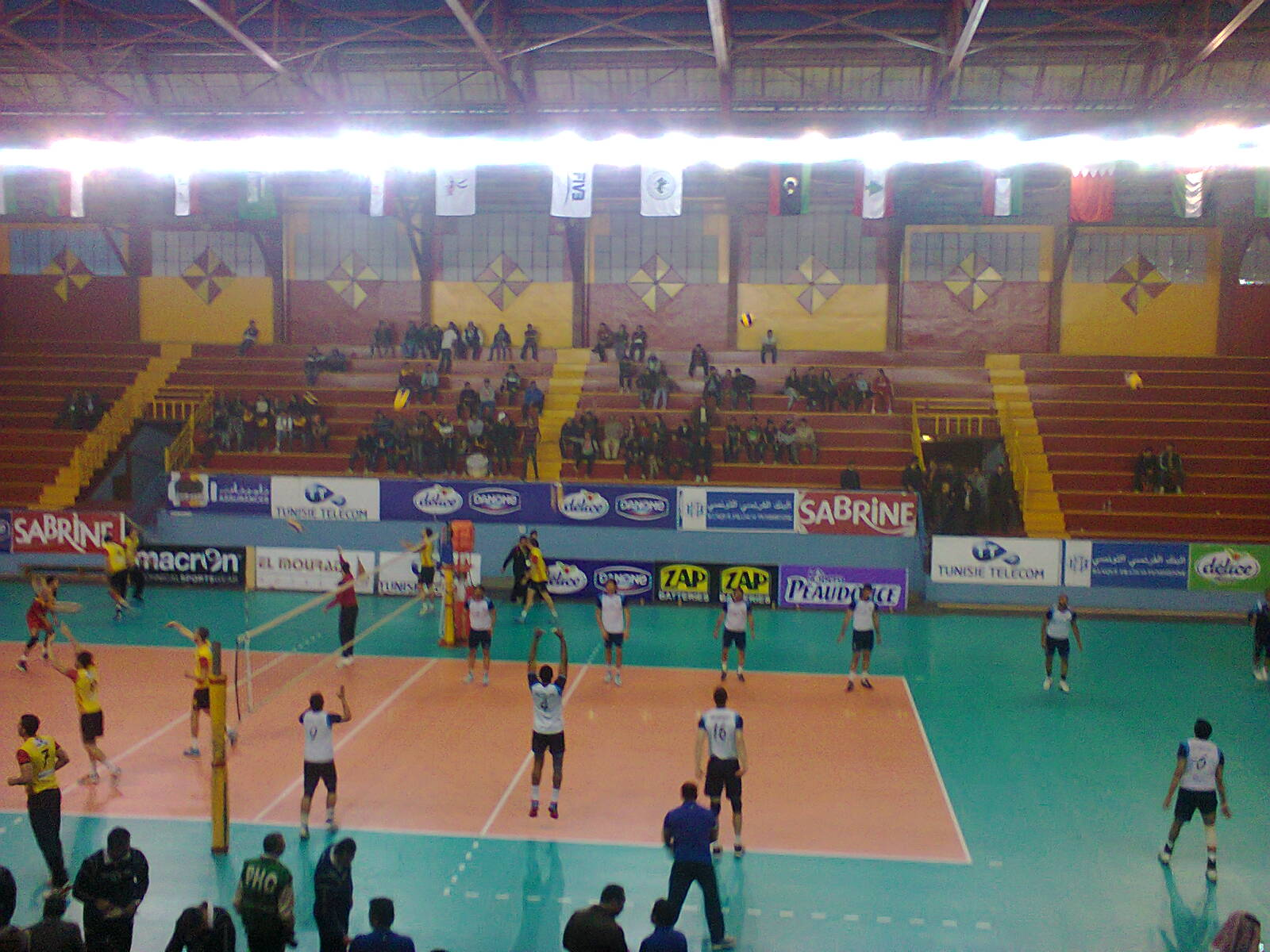
Espérance de Tunis VB game inside the hall

== Other facilities ==
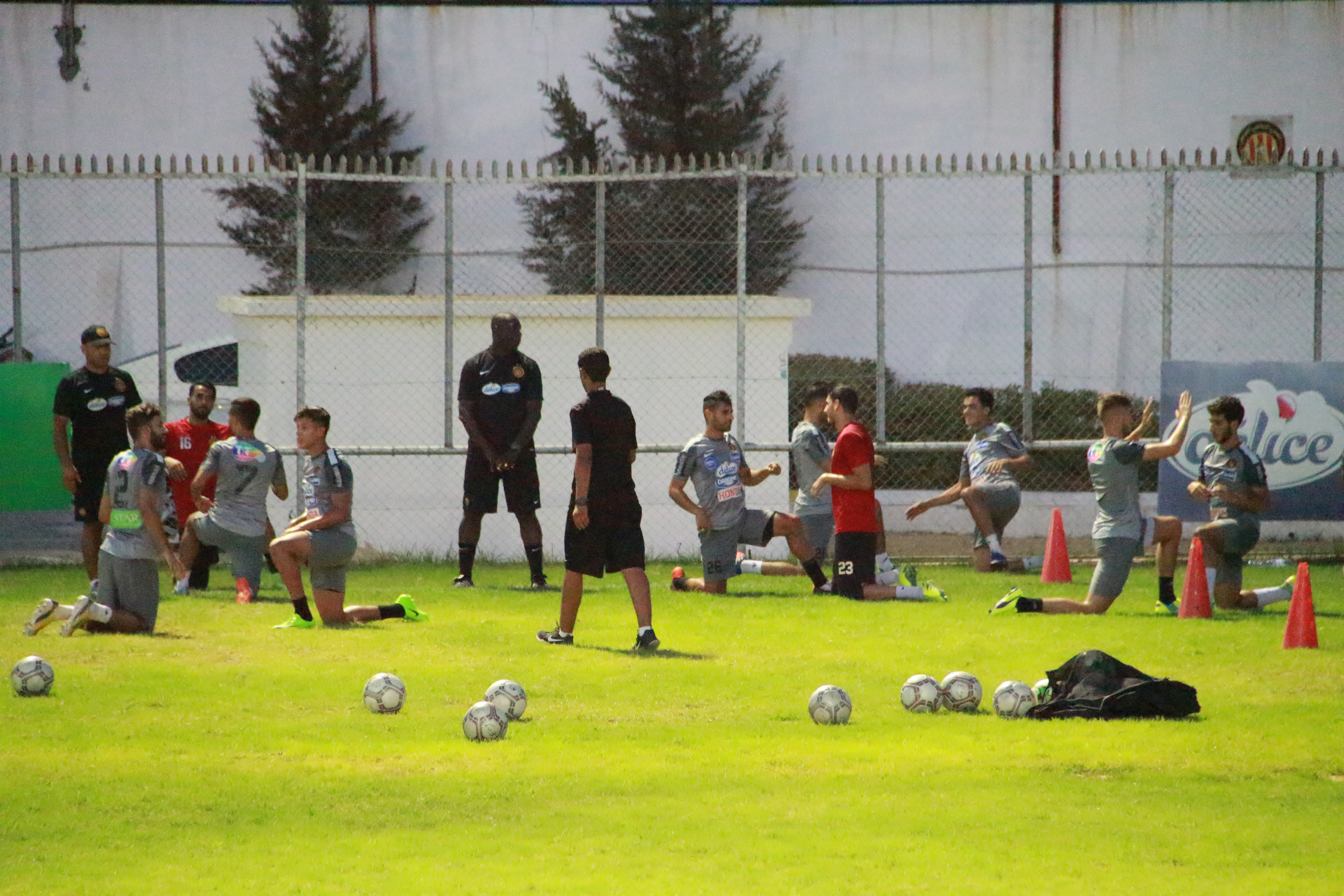
Views of Espérance de Tunis Training Session

The Hassen Belkhodja Center is also made up of:

- 4 football pitches (1 natural grass 3 artificial turf)
- 1 Dressing Room
- 1 Showering Room with Jacuzzi
- 1 massage parlour Room
- 1 Athletics track
- 1 Shooting range
- 2 Muscle strengthening halls
- 1 Volleyball training hall

== Recent development ==
After the Club Centenary back in 2019 The Espérance Sportive de Tunis Administration along with Tunis Municipality promised The development of the center, by replacing the old football pitches grass with new quality grass as well as developing the Dressing room, a new handball training Hall for the Espérance Sportive de Tunis Handball team will be built, and a new maintenance for the 1,500 Multi-sports hall will be Guaranteed, all this project will cost around 1 million Tunisian Dinar.

== Gallery ==
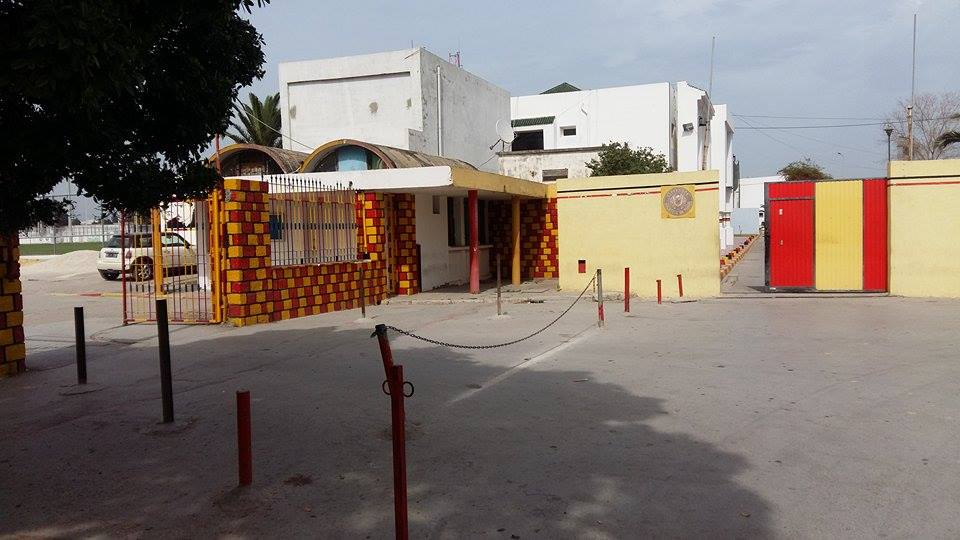
The Park see it from afar

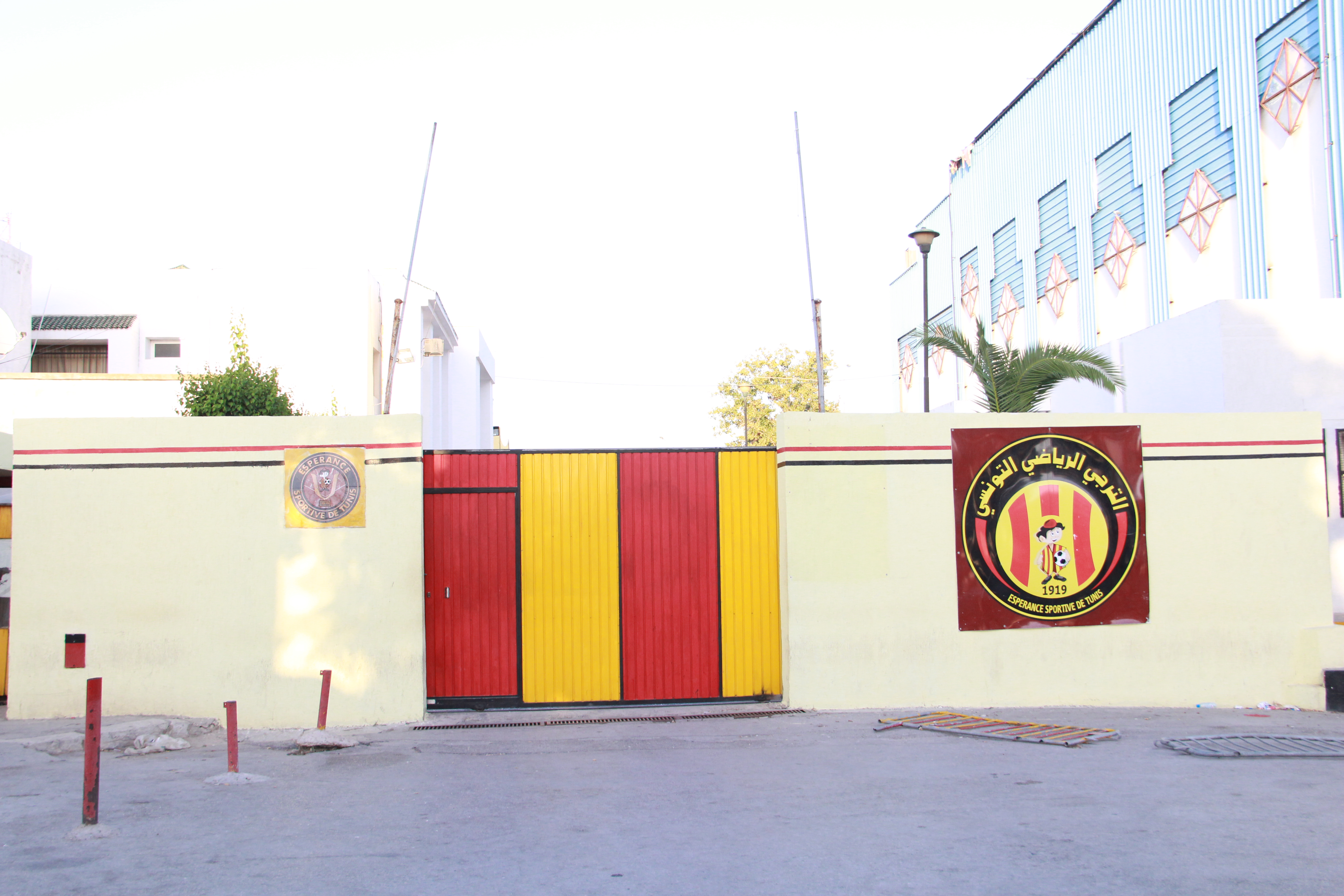
Park Main Gate Entrance

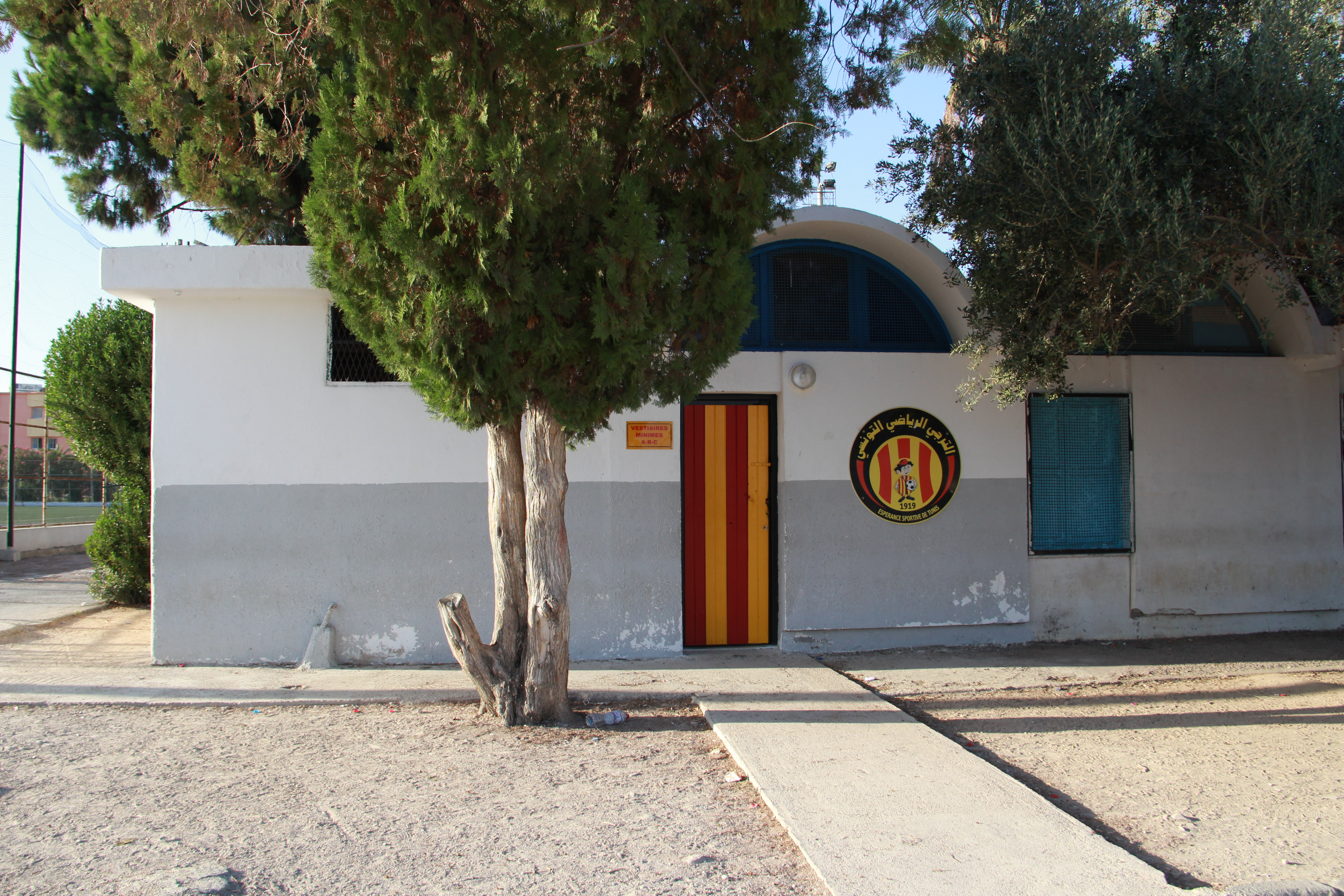
inside Park B

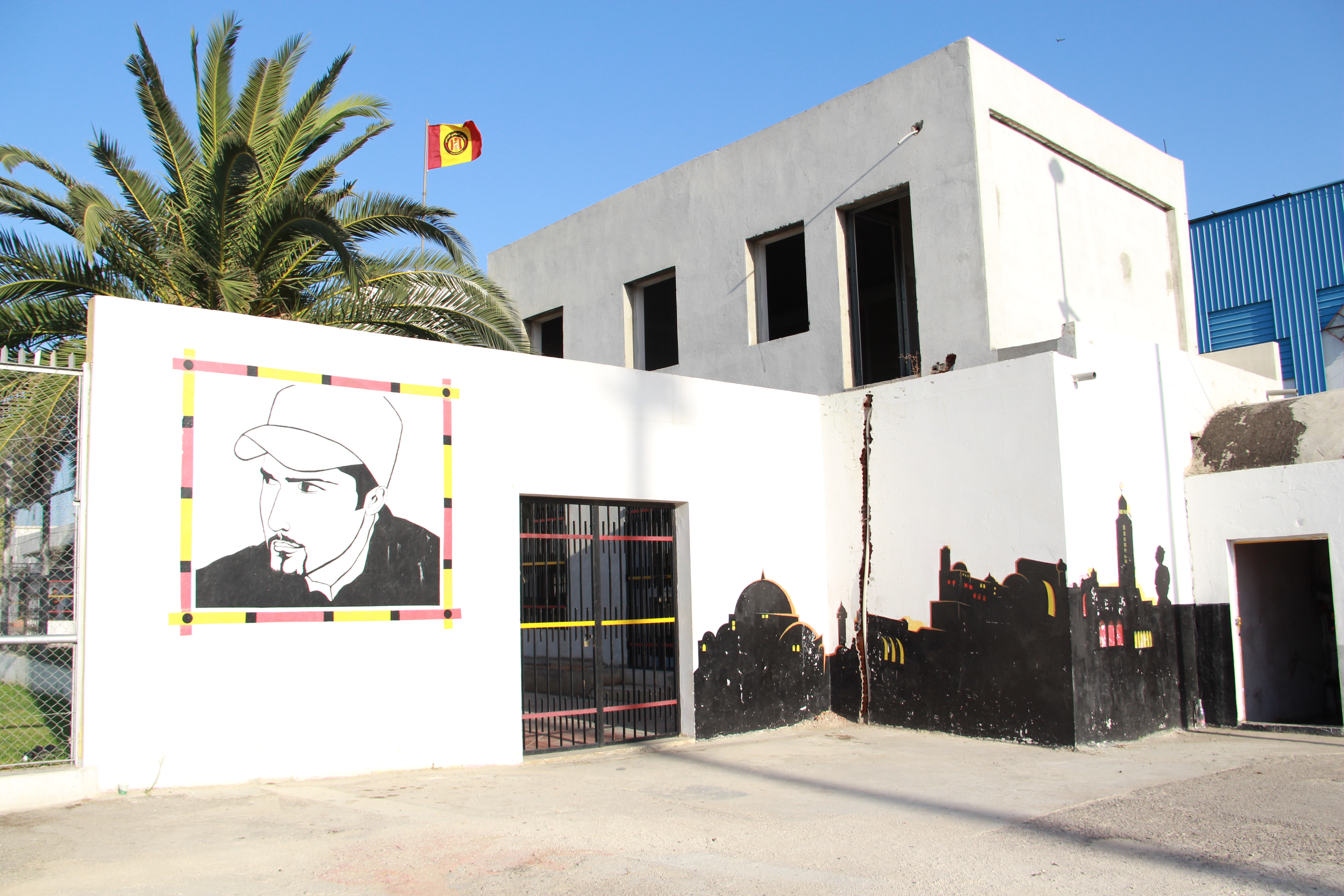
Park B Gate Entrance

== See also ==
- Stade El Menzah
- Stade Olympique de Rades
