= Lafayette (Tunis) =

Coordinates: 36.811833°N 10.181000°E

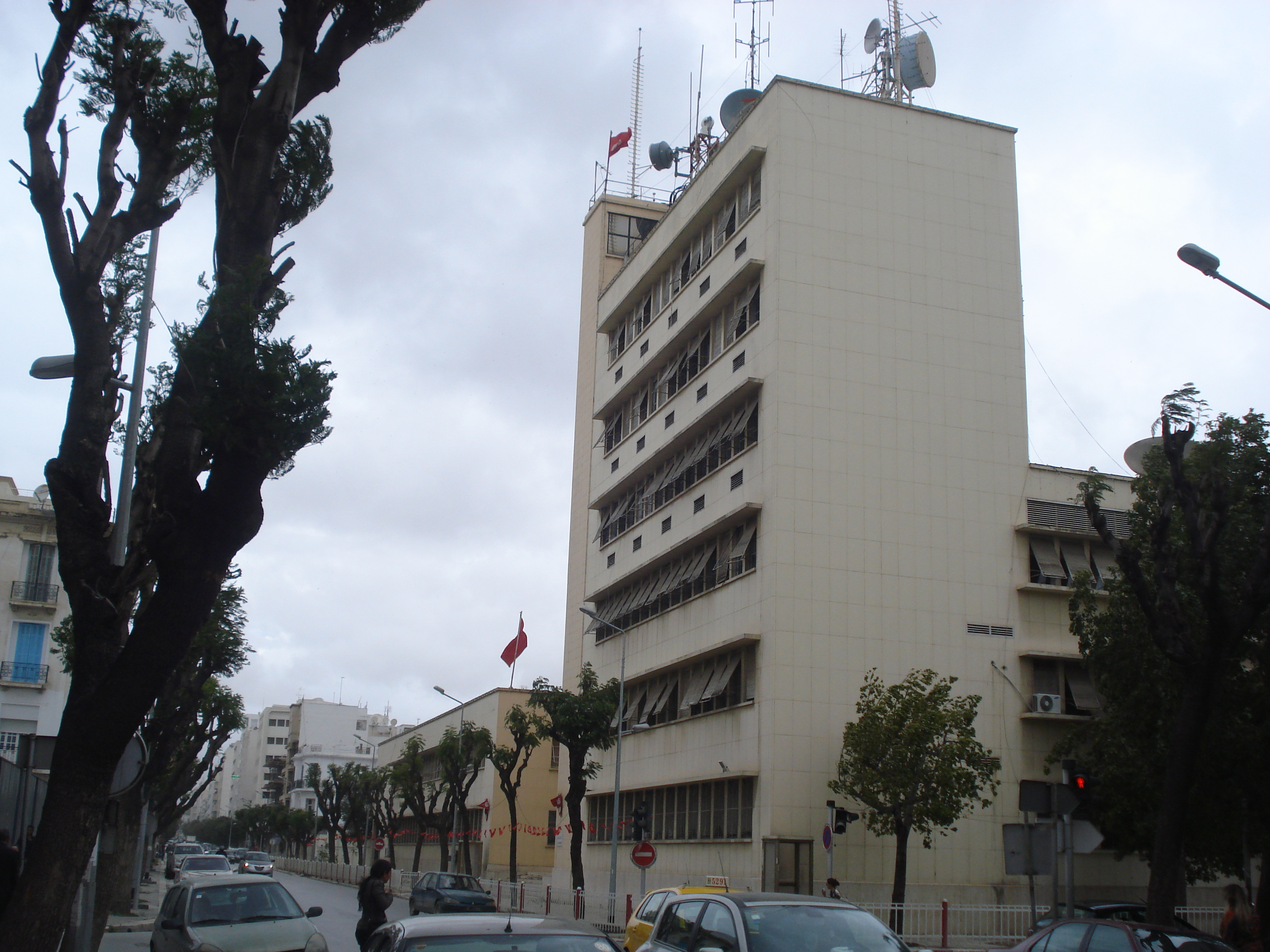
Headquarter of the Tunisian Radio since 1954

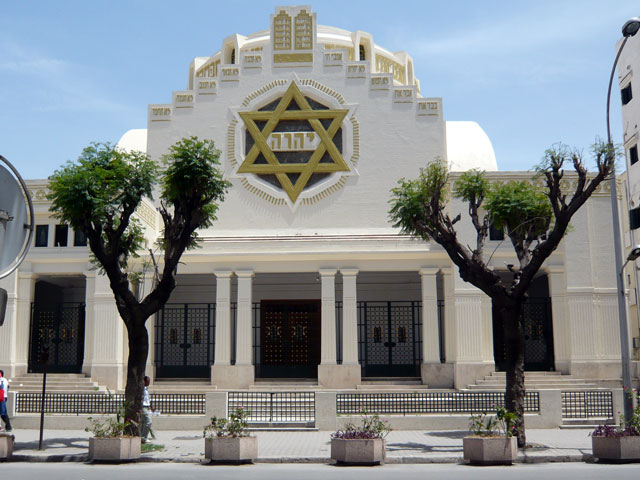
Great Synagogue of Tunis

Lafayette (Arabic: لافيات) is the central district of Tunis, the capital of Tunisia, which occupies the area north of Avenue Habib Bourguiba between Bab el Khadra on the west and Avenue Mohammed V on the east. Among the important buildings in the area are the Great Synagogue of Tunis and the headquarters of the Tunisian Radio.
