= Russian Orthodox Church of Saint Nicholas, Bari =

Chiesa di San Nicola
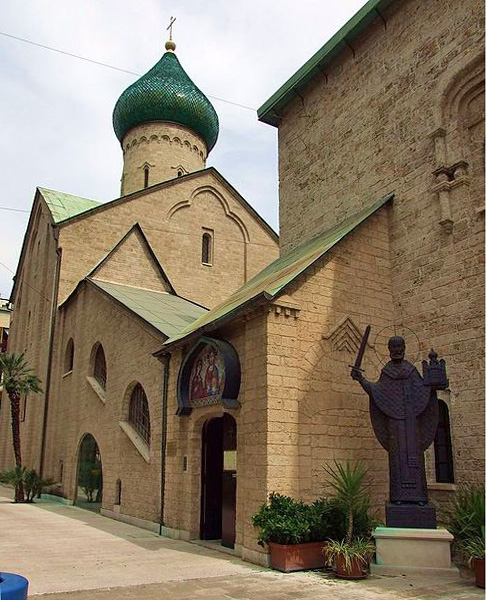

Religion
- Affiliation: Russian Orthodox

Location
- Location: Corso Benedetto Croce; Carrassi; Bari, Italy
- Interactive map of Chiesa di San Nicola
- Coordinates: 41°06′37″N 16°52′20″E

The Russian Orthodox Church of Saint Nicholas (Russian: Церковь Николая Чудотворца, Italian: Chiesa ortodossa Russa di san Nicola) is an Eastern Orthodox church building in Bari, Italy.

== History ==
The Russian Orthodox Church has a special veneration for St Nicholas, and many Russian pilgrims came to Bari. At the beginning of the 20th century The Imperial Orthodox Palestine Society decided to build a church and pilgrim house for Russian visitors. The head of the IOPS was Grand Duchess Elisabeth: the church at her convent in Moscow had been designed by Aleksei Viktorovich Shchusev, and he was chosen to design the podvorie in Bari. The foundation stone was laid on 22 May 1913. In the XIX – XX centuries many Russian buildings were created outside Russia, but the vast majority of them were designed in the Moscow-Yaroslavl style; the Bari church and podvorie, however, are in the rare Pskov-Novgorod style. After the Russian Revolution few Russian pilgrims were able to come to Bari, and in 1937 the buildings were sold to the municipality of Bari.

On 14 March 2007, on the occasion of the visit to Bari of Russian Prime Minister Vladimir Putin, negotiations began for the return of the church to Russia.

The formal donation was held on 1 March 2009 in the presence of the President of Italy Giorgio Napolitano and the President of the Russian Federation Dmitrij Medvedev.

== Gallery ==
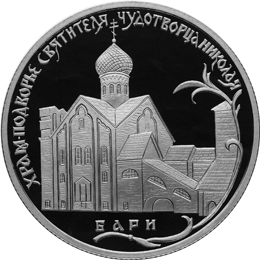
Commemorative coin of the Bank of Russia with the image of the Church of San Nicola in Bari. 2 silver rubles, 2011

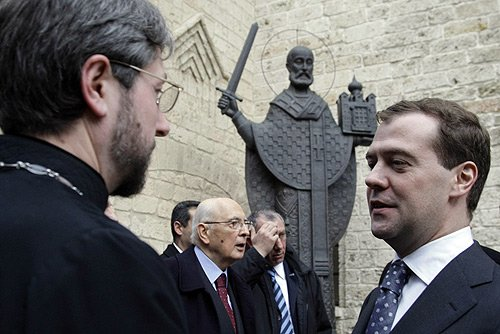
Presidents Napolitano and Medvedev visiting the church

== See also ==
- Russian Orthodox Church
