= Avenue Mohammed V (Tunis) =

Street in Tunis, Tunisia

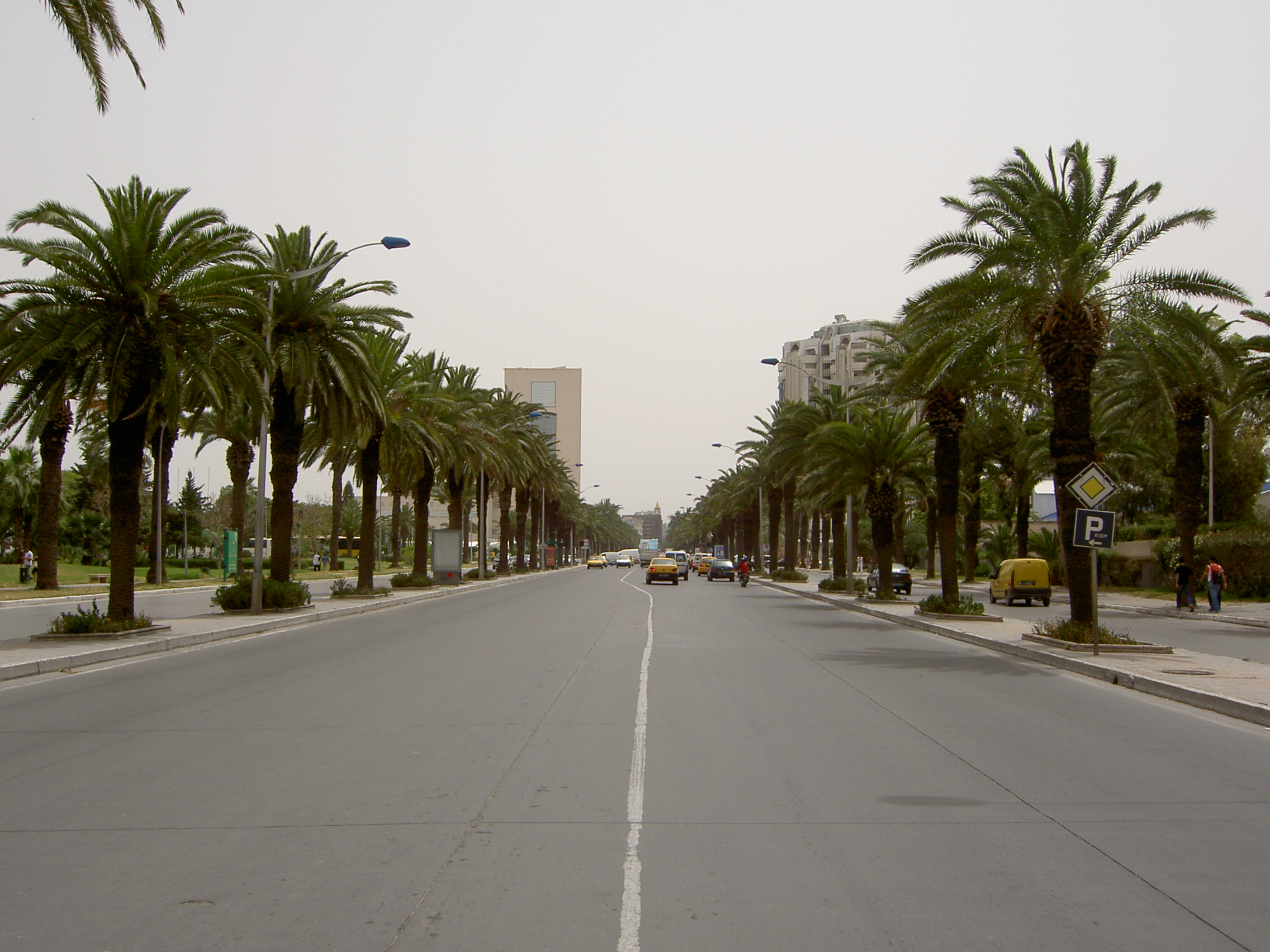
- Interactive map of Avenue Mohammed V
- Area: Gouvernorat de Tunis
- Location: Tunis
- Coordinates: 36.812079°N 10.184429°E

The Avenue Mohammed V is one of the most important avenues of Tunis, capital of the Tunisia . Named Mohammed V, King of Morocco and measuring about 1.5 km.

== Description ==
Until the mid-1950s, it was abandoned and muddy terrain and one of the city's slums. Shortly after independence, following the decree of March 16, 1957 authorizing the demolition of gourbi-ville, it was razed by the public authorities and renamed after Mohammed V of Morocco, becoming one of the most active avenues. and prestigious in the capital. Before 1957, it was known under the name of Esplanade Gambetta in honor of Léon Gambetta, French lawyer became thereafter Chairman under the Third Republic.

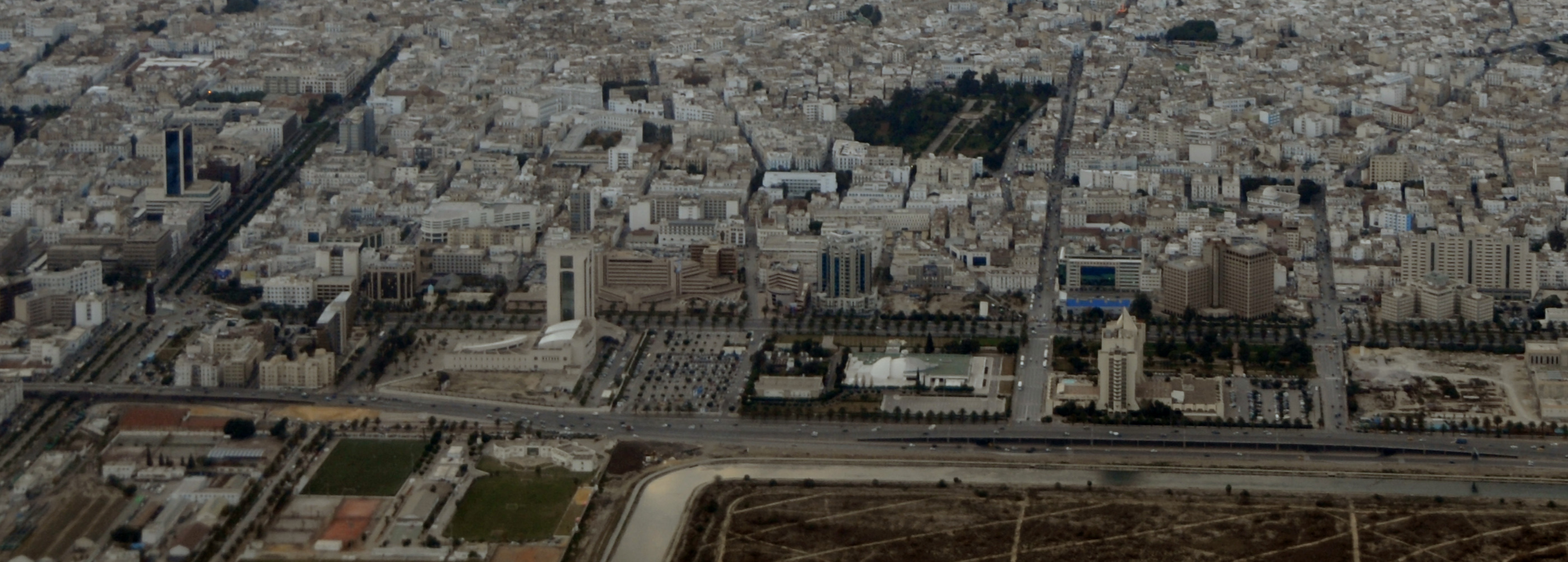

Avenue Mohammed V hosts the headquarters of the major banks in Tunisia, such as Société Tunisienne de Banque, the Banque Nationale Agricole, the Amen Bank but also Banque de l'Habitat whose tower has sixteen floors, the siege of Department of Tourism, the second siege of the Ministry of higher Education and scientific Research also, the former ruling party, the Democratic Constitutional Rally (17 store tower), and hotels such as the Hotel Tunis Congress, the White House and the Novotel.

There is also the convention center, the largest conference center in the capital, and central bank. The City of Culture, the currency Museum, the Russian Orthodox Church, Tunis, the seat Embassy of Libya, the Foundation Bouebdelli owned by Mohamed Bouebdelli and his wife Madeleine, a garden (Place of human Rights) and parking are also installed on the prestigious Avenue.

It also hosts the seat of the Ministry of Tourism, the second seat of the Ministry of Higher Education and Scientific Research, and that of the former ruling party, the Democratic Constitutional Rally, which now houses the premises of the Ministry of Domains. State and Land Affairs

== Gallery ==
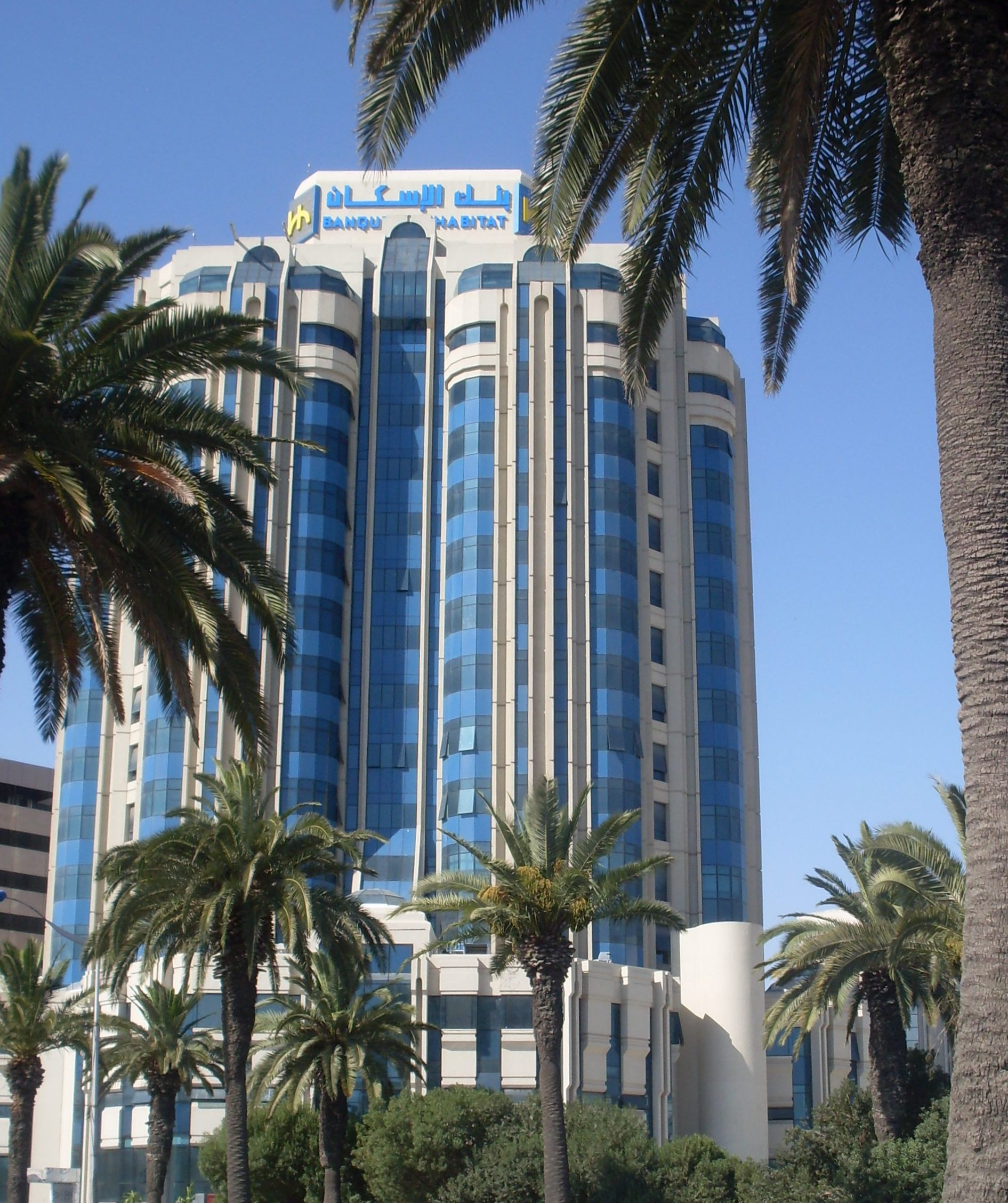
Banque de l'Habitat headquarters

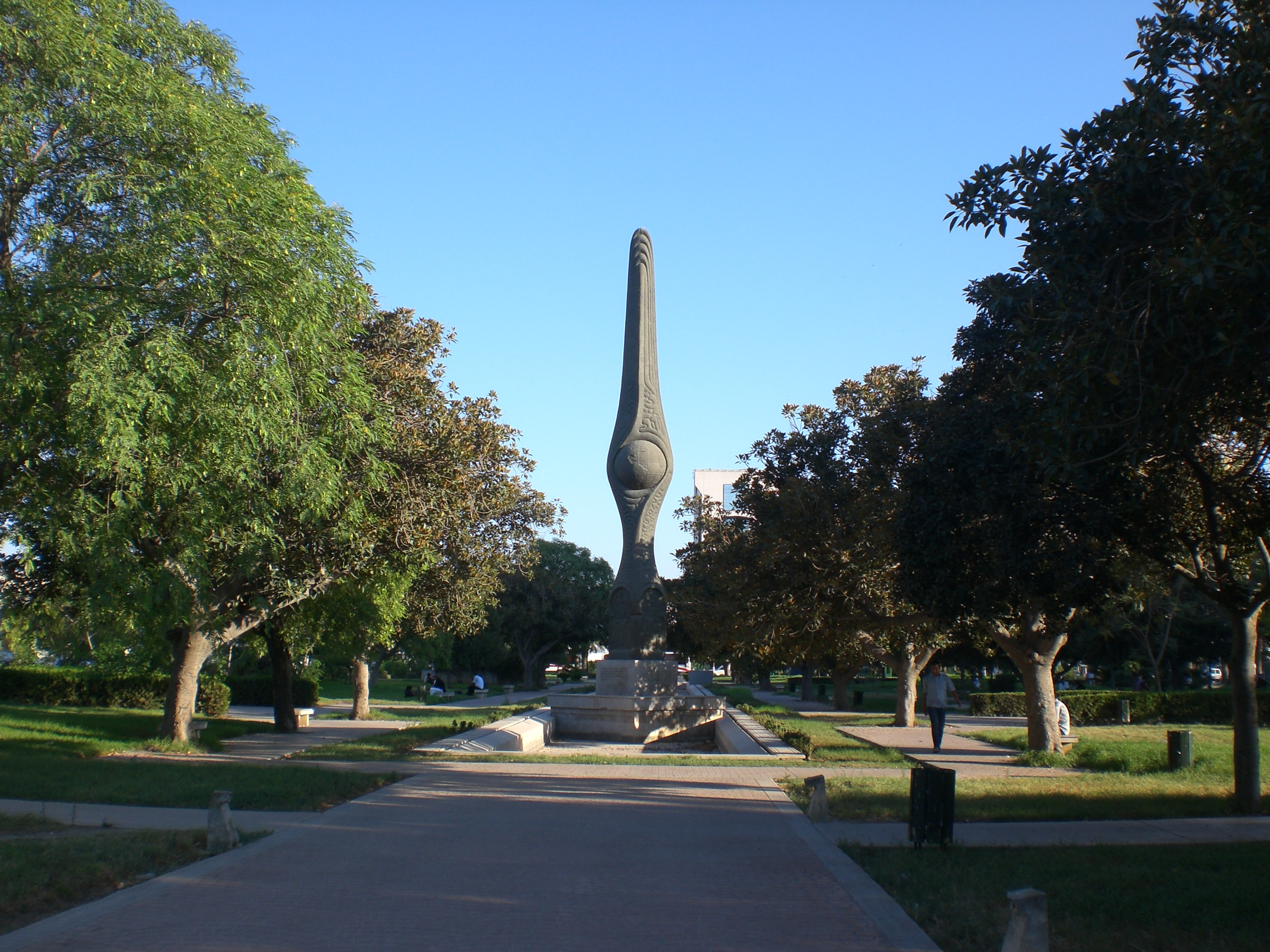
Place of droits de l'homme

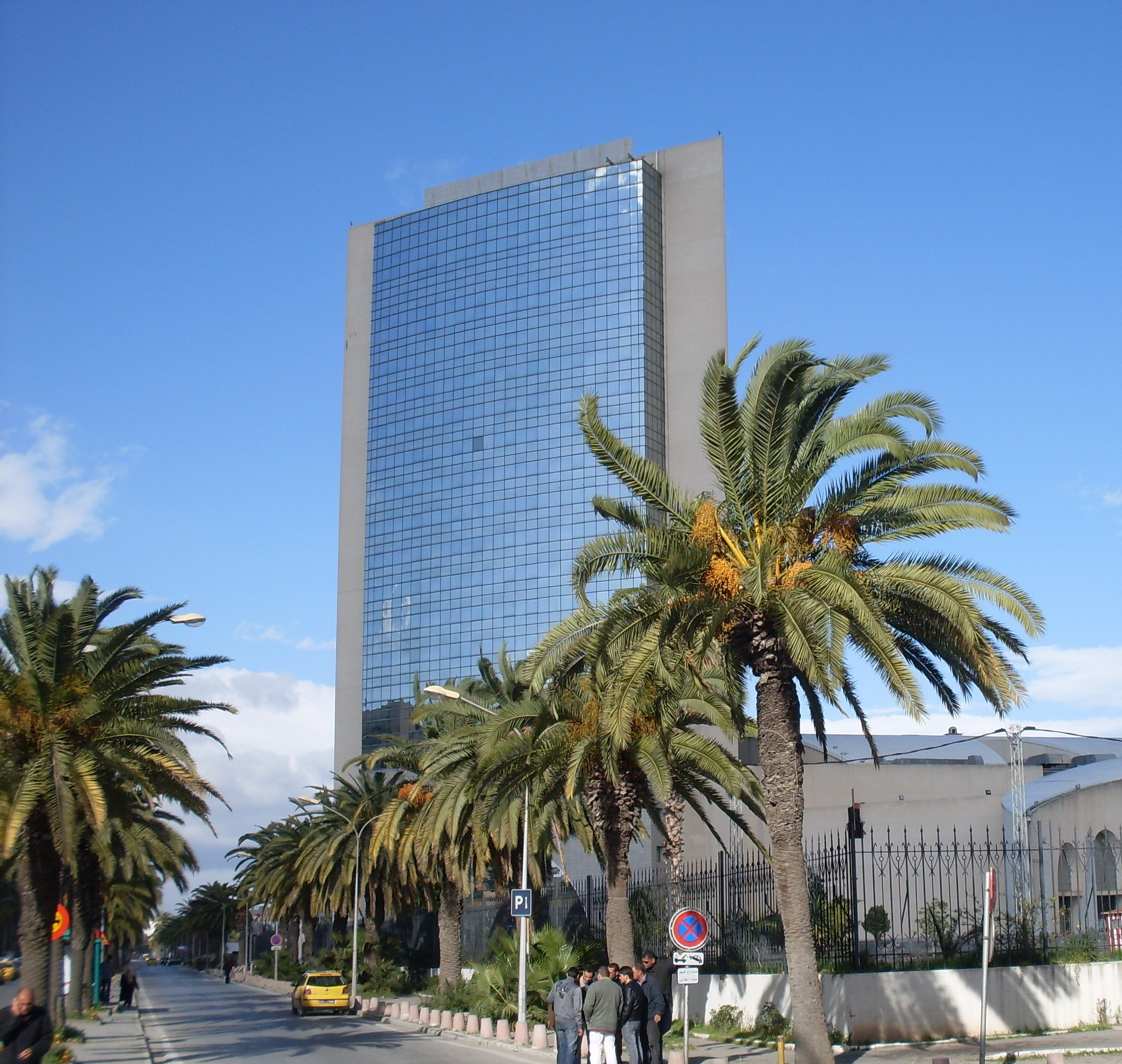
Rassemblement constitutionnel démocratique headquarters

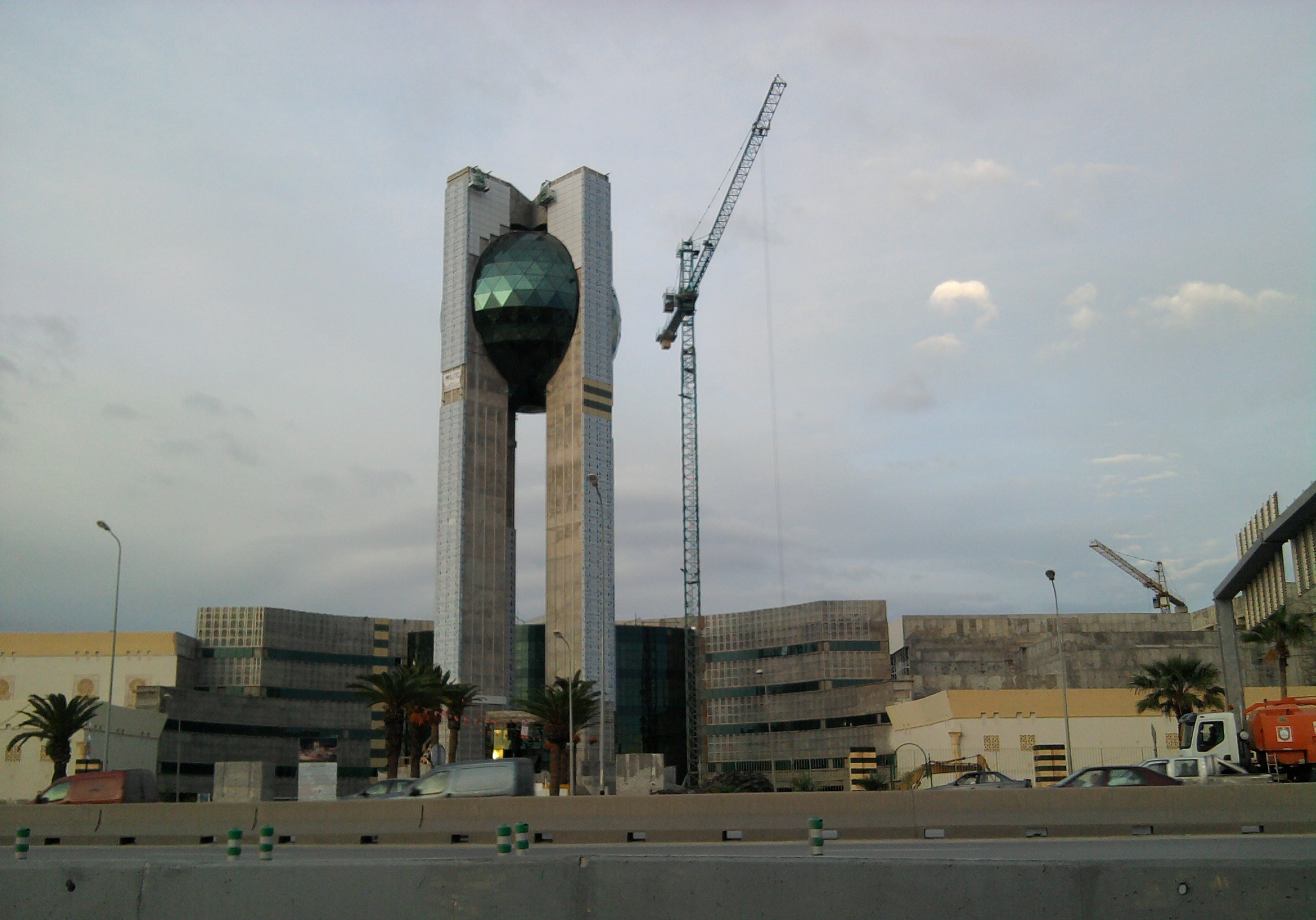
Cité de la culture whose work is in progress

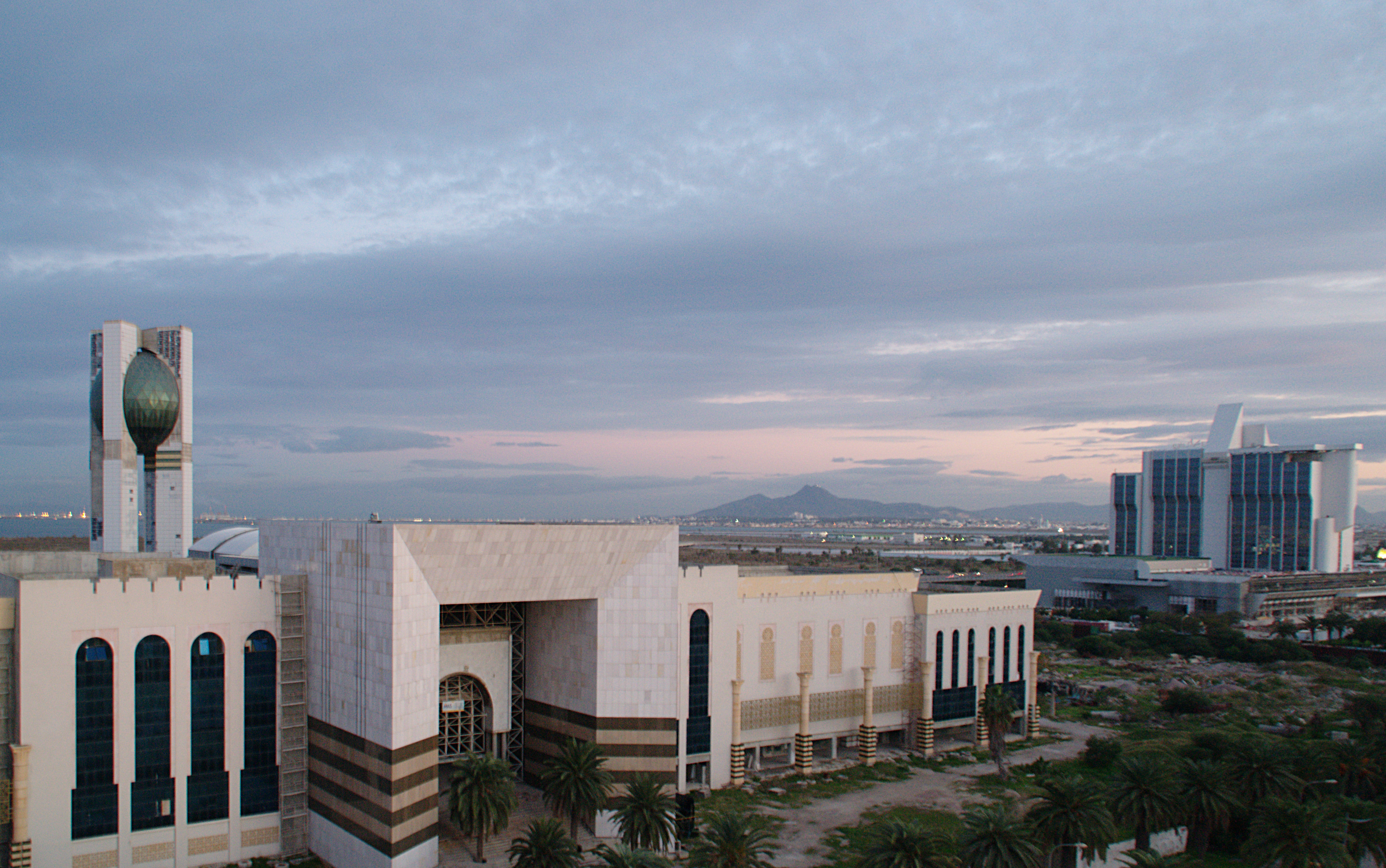
Cité de la culture

Located close to neighborhoods like Mutuelleville, Lafayette, the city El Khadra and Montplaisir hosting the Bourse de Tunis, the African Development Bank or Belvedere park, Avenue Mohammed V is connected to the rest of the city thanks to the stations Metro Mohamed V.
