= Russian Orthodox Church, Tunis =

Coordinates: 36.8021°N 10.1857°E

Russian Orthodox Church
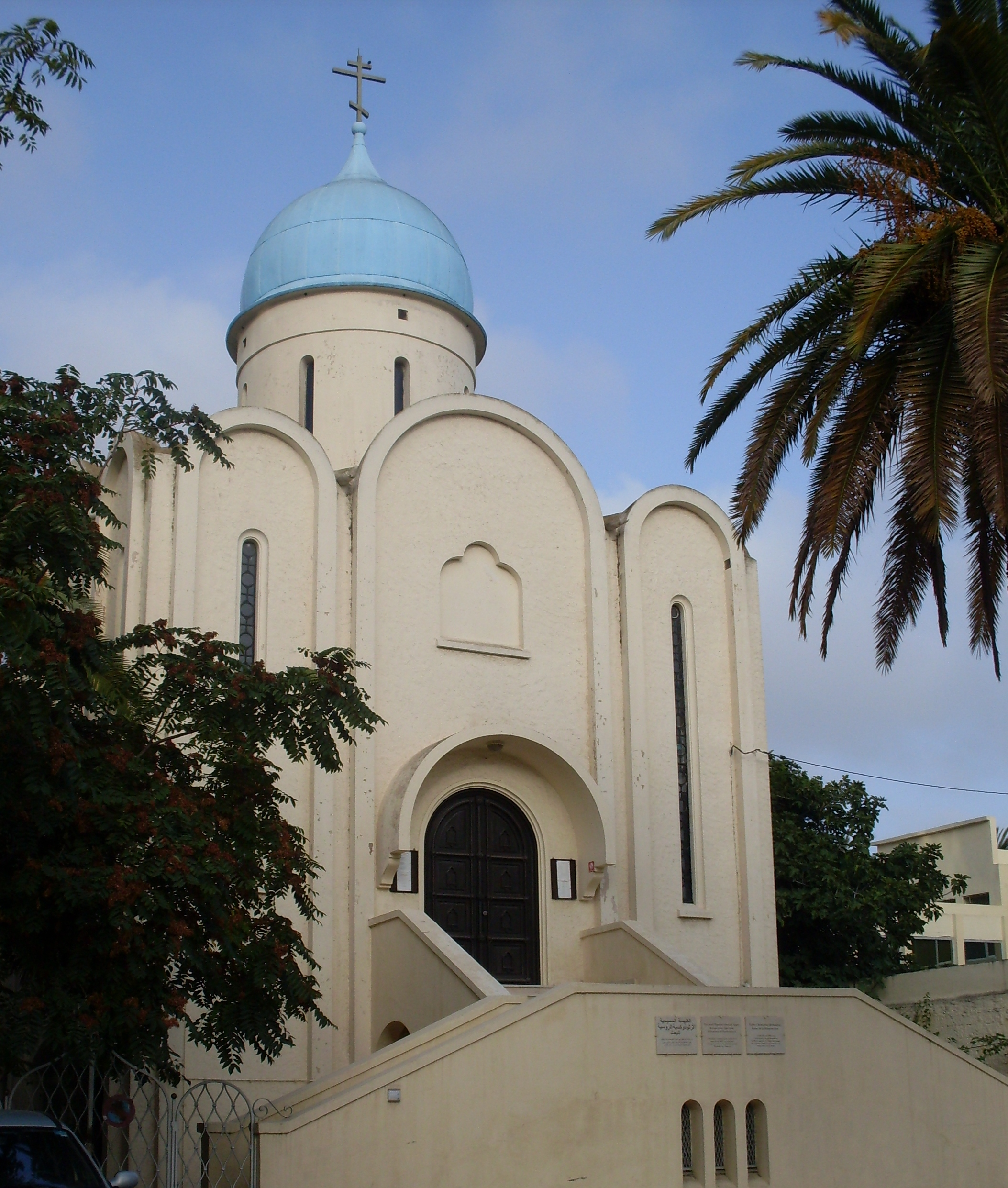
- Russian Orthodox Church
- Country: Tunisia
- Denomination: Russian Orthodox Church

The Russian Orthodox church in Tunis (Arabic: الكنيسة الأرثوذكسية الروسية بتونس), also called 'Church of the Resurrection' (Russian: Церковь Воскресения Христова) is a historic Eastern Orthodox church in Tunis, Tunisia. The church is notable for its distinctive Russian architectural style.

Located on 12 Avenue Mohammed V, it was built by the Russian community in Tunis.

The foundation stone was built in October 1953 by Russian architect Michel Kozmin (1901-1999), and the church was inaugurated on June 10, 1956.

== See also ==
- Russian Orthodox Church
- Christianity in Africa
- Russian-Tunisian Relations
