= Esplanade Gambetta =

Coordinates: 36.8040°N 10.1857°E

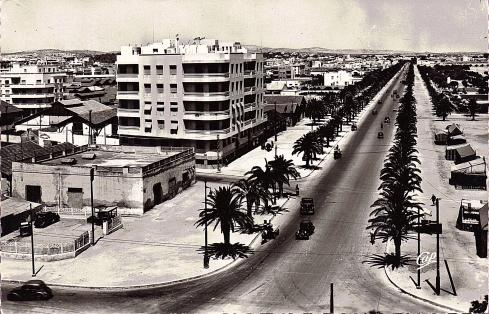
Esplanade Gambetta in 1930

Esplanade Gambetta is a plaza located in the center of the Tunisian capital, Tunis. It is named after the French lawyer and politician Léon Gambetta.
