= Zinedine Sassi =

Footballer (born 2003)

Personal information
- Full name: Zineddine Khemais Sassi
- Date of birth: 4 August 2003 (age 23)
- Place of birth: France
- Height: 1.90 m (6 ft 3 in)
- Position: Centre-back

Team information
- Current team: Al-Waab (on loan from Al Ahli)
- Number: 49

Youth career
- Montceau
- 2019–2022: Guingamp

Senior career*
Years	Team	Apps	(Gls)
2022–2025	Espérance de Tunis	1	(0)
2024	→ AS Soliman (loan)	9	(0)
2025	Al-Waab	4	(0)
2025–	Al Ahli	0	(0)
2025–	→ Al-Waab (loan)	0	(0)

International career^{‡}
2022–2023	Tunisia U20	9	(0)
- * Club domestic league appearances and goals as of 19 June 2024 ‡ National team caps and goals as of 22 May 2023

Zineddine Khemais Sassi (Arabic: زين الدين خميس ساسي; born 4 August 2003) is a professional footballer who plays as a centre-back for Al-Waab, on loan from Al Ahli. Born in France, he represented Tunisia at youth level.

== Al-Ahli ==
On 8 August 2025, Sassi was transferred to Al Ahli in Qatar.
