= Houssem Dagdoug =

Tunisian association football player

Personal information
- Full name: Houssem Dagdoug
- Date of birth: 23 July 1998 (age 28)
- Place of birth: Sfax, Tunisia
- Height: 1.91 m (6 ft 3 in)
- Position: Defender

Team information
- Current team: Étoile sportive du Sahel

Senior career*
Years	Team	Apps	(Gls)
2016–2022	Club Sfaxien	71	(2)
2022–2023	Espérance de Tunis	8	(0)
2024–	Étoile sportive du Sahel	15	(1)
- * Club domestic league appearances and goals as of 20 February 2025

Houssem Dagdoug (born 23 July 1998) is a Tunisian footballer who plays as a defender for Egyptian Premier League club Tala'ea El Gaish.

== Honours ==
Club Sfaxien

- Tunisian Cup: 2018–19, 2020–21
