= 2021–22 Espérance Sportive de Tunis season =

Espérance Sportive de Tunis
2021–22 season
- President: Hamdi Meddeb
- Head coach: Radhi Jaïdi (until 8 June); Nabil Maâloul (from 9 June)
- Stadium: Stade Hammadi Agrebi
- Ligue 1: Winners
- Tunisian Cup: Round of 16
- Super Cup: 2019–20: Runners–up; 2020–21: Winners
- Champions League: Quarter-finals
- Top goalscorer: League: Mohamed Ali Ben Hammouda (8); All: Mohamed Ali Ben Hammouda (11)
- Biggest win: Espérance de Tunis 4–0 Jwaneng Galaxy (12 February 2022); Espérance de Tunis 4–0 CA Bizertin (9 March 2022)
- Biggest defeat: US Tataouine 2–1 Espérance de Tunis (19 November 2021); CS Sfaxien 1–0 Espérance de Tunis (6 March 2022); CS Hammam-Lif 2–1 Espérance de Tunis (6 April 2022); Espérance de Tunis 0–1 ES Sétif (22 April 2022); US Monastir 3–2 Espérance de Tunis (26 May 2022)

In the 2021–22 season, Espérance Sportive de Tunis competed in the Ligue 1 for the 67th season, as well as the Tunisian Cup. It was their 67th consecutive season in the top flight of Tunisian football. They competed in Ligue 1, the Champions League, the Tunisian Cup, 2019–20 Tunisian Super Cup and the 2020–21 Tunisian Super Cup.

On the domestic front, Espérance de Tunis delivered two trophies out of possible four, winning the Ligue 1, in the last round after a late 2–1 win against US Ben Guerdane, and the 2020–21 Tunisian Super Cup, but they left the Tunisian Cup against CS M'saken after a 1–1 draw after 120 minutes and a 6–5 loss on penalties.

On the continental front, Espérance de Tunis left the Champions League from the quarter-finals after a surprise loss to ES Sétif with a score of 1–0 on aggregate.

This season was the last for the two team legends, Khalil Chemmam and Sameh Derbali, who announced their retirement at the end of the season.

== Squad list ==
Note: Flags indicate national team as has been defined under FIFA eligibility rules. Players may hold more than one non-FIFA nationality.

No.	Nat.	Name	Date of birth (age)	Signed from
Goalkeepers
1	(Tunisia)	Moez Ben Cherifia	24 June 1991 (aged 31)	(Tunisia) Youth system
16	(Tunisia)	Farouk Ben Mustapha	1 July 1989 (aged 32)	(Saudi Arabia) Al Shabab
19	(Tunisia)	Mohamed Sedki Debchi	28 October 1999 (aged 22)	(Tunisia) AS Gabès
31	(Tunisia)	Wassim Karoui	7 January 1997 (aged 25)	(Tunisia) Youth system
Defenders
2	(Tunisia)	Sameh Derbali	23 November 1986 (aged 35)	(Libya) Al Ahli Tripoli
4	(Algeria)	Mohamed Amine Tougai	22 January 2000 (aged 22)	(Algeria) NA Hussein Dey
6	(Tunisia)	Mohamed Ali Yacoubi	5 October 1990 (aged 31)	(France) Quevilly-Rouen
12	(Tunisia)	Khalil Chemmam (C)	24 July 1987 (aged 34)	(Portugal) Vitória de Guimarães
20	(Tunisia)	Mohamed Amine Ben Hamida	15 December 1995 (aged 26)	(Tunisia) Youth system
22	(Tunisia)	Hani Amamou	16 September 1997 (aged 24)	(Tunisia) CS Sfaxien
23	(Algeria)	Ilyes Chetti	22 January 1995 (aged 27)	(Algeria) JS Kabylie
29	(Tunisia)	Zied Machmoum	18 January 1993 (aged 29)	(Tunisia) US Monastir
30	(Algeria)	Abdelkader Bedrane	2 April 1992 (aged 30)	(Algeria) ES Sétif
32	(Tunisia)	Raed Fedaa	20 May 1997 (aged 25)	(Tunisia) Youth system
34	(Tunisia)	Bilel Chabbar	31 March 2000 (aged 22)	(Tunisia) Youth system
Midfielders
5	(Tunisia)	Mohamed Ali Ben Romdhane	6 September 1999 (aged 22)	(Tunisia) Youth system
11	(Morocco)	Sabir Bougrine	10 July 1996 (aged 25)	(Azerbaijan) Neftchi Baku
15	(Ivory Coast)	Fousseny Coulibaly	10 August 1989 (aged 32)	(Tunisia) US Monastir
24	(Tunisia)	Fedi Ben Choug	12 March 1995 (aged 27)	(Tunisia) CA Bizertin
25	(Tunisia)	Ghailene Chaalali	28 February 1994 (aged 28)	(Turkey) Malatyaspor
26	(Tunisia)	Montassar Triki	29 August 2001 (aged 20)	(Tunisia) Youth system
28	(Tunisia)	Mohamed Amine Meskini	5 June 1997 (aged 25)	(Tunisia) CS Hammam-Lif
35	(Tunisia)	Ghaith Ouahabi	2 May 2003 (aged 19)	(Tunisia) Youth system
Forwards
3	(Tunisia)	Rached Arfaoui	7 March 1996 (aged 26)	(Tunisia) AS Soliman
7	(Tunisia)	Alaeddine Marzouki	3 July 1990 (aged 31)	(Tunisia) CS Sfaxien
8	(Tunisia)	Anice Badri	18 September 1990 (aged 31)	(Saudi Arabia) Al-Ittihad
9	(Tunisia)	Zied Berrima	4 September 2001 (aged 20)	(Tunisia) Youth system
10	(Libya)	Hamdou Elhouni	12 February 1994 (aged 28)	(Portugal) Desportivo das Aves
14	(Nigeria)	Kingsley Eduwo	19 June 1996 (aged 26)	(United Arab Emirates) Al Urooba
17	(Nigeria)	Anayo Iwuala	20 March 1999 (aged 23)	(Nigeria) Enyimba
21	(Ivory Coast)	David Koffi	16 January 2001 (aged 21)	(Ivory Coast) AFAD Djékanou
33	(Tunisia)	Farouk Mimouni	13 June 2001 (aged 21)	(Tunisia) Youth system
37	(Tunisia)	Mohamed Ali Ben Hammouda	24 July 1998 (aged 23)	(Tunisia) AS Soliman
Coach	(Tunisia)	Nabil Maâloul	25 December 1962 (aged 59)	Kuwait SC

Staff:

- (Tunisia) Anis Boussaïdi (assistant coach)
- (Tunisia) Hamdi Kasraoui (goalkeeper coach)
- (Tunisia) Sabri Bouazizi (fitness coach)
- (Tunisia) Aymen Mathlouthi (fitness coach)
- (Tunisia) Yassine Ben Ahmed (doctor)
- (Tunisia) Lassad Lamari (physiotherapist)
- (Tunisia) Nabil Ghazouani (physiotherapist)
- (Tunisia) Seifeddine Dziri (physiotherapist)

== Transfers ==
=== In ===
Date	Name	From	Type	Source
1 July 2021	(Tunisia) Rached Arfaoui	(Tunisia) AS Soliman	Transfer	
9 August 2021	(Nigeria) Anayo Iwuala	(Nigeria) Enyimba	Transfer	
12 August 2021	(Tunisia) Zied Machmoum	(Tunisia) US Monastir	Transfer	
12 August 2021	(Ghana) Percious Boah	(Ghana) Dreams FC	Transfer	
14 August 2021	(Ivory Coast) David Koffi	(Ivory Coast) AFAD Djékanou	Transfer	
15 September 2021	(Senegal) Moussa Konaté	(France) Dijon	Loan	
7 December 2021	(Tunisia) Hani Amamou	(Tunisia) CS Sfaxien	Free transfer	
3 January 2022	(Tunisia) Mohamed Ali Ben Hammouda	(Tunisia) AS Soliman	Loan	
10 January 2022	(Morocco) Sabir Bougrine	(Azerbaijan) Neftchi Baku	Transfer	
28 January 2022	(Nigeria) Kingsley Eduwo	(United Arab Emirates) Al Urooba	Free transfer	

=== Out ===
Date	Name	To	Type
1 July 2021	(Ivory Coast) William Togui	(Belgium) Mechelen	End of loan
1 July 2021	(Ivory Coast) Ibrahim Ouattara	(Libya) Al Ahly Benghazi	End of contract
1 July 2021	(Tunisia) Maher Ben Sghaïer	(Tunisia) US Monastir	End of contract
1 July 2021	(Tunisia) Aymen Mahmoud	(Kuwait) Al-Arabi	End of contract
1 July 2021	(Tunisia) Afif Jebali	(Iraq) Al-Mina'a	End of contract
1 July 2021	(Tunisia) Houcine Rabii	(Tunisia) CS Hammam-Lif	End of contract
1 July 2021	(Tunisia) Taha Yassine Khenissi	Kuwait SC	End of contract
29 July 2021	(Tunisia) Youssef Mosrati	(Tunisia) AS Soliman	Loan
29 July 2021	(Ghana) Basit Abdul Khalid	(Moldova) Sheriff Tiraspol	Mutual termination
1 August 2021	(Nigeria) Samuel Atvati	(Tunisia) ES Métlaoui	Loan
5 August 2021	(Algeria) Abderrahmane Meziane	(Algeria) USM Alger	Mutual termination
19 August 2021	(Tunisia) Moumen Rahmani	(Tunisia) US Tataouine	Loan
1 September 2021	(Tunisia) Hamdi Nagguez	(Egypt) Zamalek	Mutual termination
1 September 2021	(Tunisia) Mouhib Selmi	(Tunisia) CS Hammam-Lif	Loan
8 September 2021	(Algeria) Abdelraouf Benguit	(Algeria) MC Alger	Unilateral termination
10 September 2021	(Tunisia) Badreddine Mouelhi	(Tunisia) AS Soliman	Loan
10 September 2021	(Tunisia) Hamza Ghanmi	(Tunisia) ES Métlaoui	Loan
2 October 2021	(Algeria) Billel Bensaha	(Algeria) JS Kabylie	Transfer
19 January 2022	(Ghana) Percious Boah	(Tunisia) CS Hammam-Lif	Loan
28 January 2022	(Senegal) Moussa Konaté	(France) Dijon	Temination of loan
31 January 2022	(Tunisia) Nour Beji	(Tunisia) ES Zarzis	Loan
11 March 2022	(Ivory Coast) Cedrik Gbo	(Belgium) OH Leuven	Loan
24 March 2022	(Switzerland) Nassim Ben Khalifa	(Japan) Sanfrecce Hiroshima	Mutual termination

== Friendlies ==
14 August 2021 Friendly	Espérance de Tunis	8–0	JS Soukra	Tunis
18:00	Chaalali 23'; Ben Hamida 30'; Elhouni 35'; Marzouki 39'; Ben Choug 55'; Ben Khalifa 65'; Ben Romdhane 80'; Mimouni 83'	Report		Stadium: Parc Hassen Belkhodja

20 August 2021 Friendly	Espérance de Tunis	7–0	Al Ahly Andoulsi	Tunis
18:30	Chabbar 7', 23'; Ben Khalifa 24'; Coulibaly 32'; Arfaoui 34'; Beji 57'; Mimouni 70'	Report		Stadium: Parc Hassen Belkhodja

21 August 2021 Friendly	Espérance de Tunis	3–0	AS Marsa	Tunis
18:30	Arfaoui 16'; Ben Romdhane 27' (pen.); Marzouki 35' (pen.)	Report		Stadium: Parc Hassen Belkhodja

27 August 2021 Friendly	Espérance de Tunis	1–0	ES Hammam-Sousse	Tunis
18:30	Chaalali 18'	Report		Stadium: Parc Hassen Belkhodja

28 August 2021 Friendly	Espérance de Tunis	0–0	AS Soliman	Tunis
18:00		Report		Stadium: Parc Hassen Belkhodja

3 September 2021 Friendly	US Ben Guerdane	1–0	Espérance de Tunis	Djerba
17:30	Zaidi 55'	Report		Stadium: Midoun Municipal Stadium

4 September 2021 Friendly	Espérance de Tunis	4–1	US Tataouine	Djerba
18:30	Arfaoui 17'; Fedaa 26', 44'; Jabri 77'	Report	Cheikh El Welly 89' (pen.)	Stadium: Midoun Municipal Stadium

11 September 2021 Friendly	Espérance de Tunis	1–2	AS Soliman	Tunis
18:00	Ben Romdhane 52' (pen.)	Report	Khalfa 34'; Bilel 90'	Stadium: Parc Hassen Belkhodja

26 September 2021 Friendly	Espérance de Tunis	7–0	AS Soukra	Tunis
10:00	Ben Choug 16', 20'; Yacoubi 21' (pen.); Koffi 40'; Guenichi 41'; Abid 60'; Hamrouni 69'	Report		Stadium: Parc Hassen Belkhodja

9 October 2021 Friendly	Espérance de Tunis	0–0	AS Rejiche	Tunis
16:00		Report		Stadium: Parc Hassen Belkhodja

7 November 2021 Friendly	Espérance de Tunis	5–0	AS Soukra	Tunis
11:30	Berrima; Konaté; Chabbar	Report		Stadium: Parc Hassen Belkhodja

13 November 2021 Friendly	Espérance de Tunis	2–0	AS Rejiche	Tunis
14:15	Arfaoui 7'; Marzouki 23'	Report		Stadium: Parc Hassen Belkhodja

14 December 2021 Friendly	Espérance de Tunis	3–1	ES Radès	Tunis
14:00	Mimouni 25', 43'; Marzouki 73'	Report	Yacoubi 34' (o.g.)	Stadium: Stade El Menzah

15 December 2021 Friendly	Espérance de Tunis	1–0	AS Oued Ellil	Tunis
13:00	Arfaoui 72'	Report		Stadium: Parc Hassen Belkhodja

25 December 2021 Friendly	Espérance de Tunis	2–1	CA Bizertin	Soliman
14:00	Iwuala 39'; Konaté 52'	Report	Jendoubi	Stadium: Stade municipal de Soliman

26 December 2021 Friendly	Espérance de Tunis	4–0	AS Oued Ellil	Tunis
15:00	Elhouni 6'; Ben Khalifa 35'; Chabbar 63'; Gbo 65'	Report		Stadium: Parc Hassen Belkhodja

26 December 2021 Friendly	Espérance de Tunis	2–0	CS Menzel Bouzelfa	Tunis
14:30	Jabri 64', 75'	Report		Stadium: Parc Hassen Belkhodja

29 December 2021 Friendly	CA Bizertin	1–2	Espérance de Tunis	Bizerte
14:00	Ben Ameur 63'	Report	Konaté 44'; Coulibaly 70'	Stadium: Stade 15 Octobre

8 January 2022 Friendly	Espérance de Tunis	2–1	CS Chebba	Tunis
14:15	Marzouki; Abid	Report	Abdessalam	Stadium: Parc Hassen Belkhodja

15 January 2022 Friendly	CS Hammam-Lif	1–1	Espérance de Tunis	Tunis
14:00	Bangoura 3' (pen.)	Report	Abid 90'	Stadium: Stade Bou Kornine; Attendance: 0 (close doors) (Note: The match was played behind closed doors due to the COVID-19 pandemic in Tunisia.)

23 January 2022 Friendly	AS Soliman	1–1	Espérance de Tunis	Soliman
14:00	Baffour 9'	Report	Elhouni 31'	Stadium: Stade municipal de Soliman

27 January 2022 Friendly	Espérance de Tunis	1–1	CS Chebba	Tunis
14:30	Ben Khalifa 6'	Report	Abdessalam 81'	Stadium: Parc Hassen Belkhodja

30 January 2022 Friendly	Olympique Béja	0–1	Espérance de Tunis	Béja
14:30		Report	Bougrine 60'	Stadium: Stade Boujemaa Kmiti

5 February 2022 Friendly	Espérance de Tunis	4–1	AS Soliman	Tunis
14:00	Eduwo 44'; Bedrane 57', 69'; Ben Hamida 64'	Report	Mbarek	Stadium: Parc Hassen Belkhodja

6 February 2022 Friendly	Espérance de Tunis	1–0	Olympique Béja	Tunis
14:00	Marzouki 90'	Report		Stadium: Parc Hassen Belkhodja

13 February 2022 Friendly	Espérance de Tunis	2–2	AS Rejiche	Tunis
13:00	Ben Hammouda; Mimouni	Report		Stadium: Parc Hassen Belkhodja

26 March 2022 Friendly	Espérance de Tunis	1–0	AS Rejiche	Tunis
14:00	Iwuala 33'	Report		Stadium: Parc Hassen Belkhodja

== Competitions ==
=== Overview ===
Competition	Record								Started round	Final position / round	First match	Last match
Competition	G	W	D	L	GF	GA	GD	Win %	Started round	Final position / round	First match	Last match
Ligue 1	24	14	6	4	36	15	+21	58.33	First round	Winners	27 October 2021	26 June 2022
Tunisian Cup	2	1	1	0	4	1	+3	50.00	Round of 32	Round of 16	3 June 2022	8 June 2022
2019–20 Super Cup	1	0	1	0	1	1	+0	0.00	Final	Runners–up	18 September 2021	
2020–21 Super Cup	1	1	0	0	1	0	+1	100.00	Final	Winners	25 September 2021	
Champions League	10	5	4	1	13	3	+10	50.00	Second round	Quarter-finals	17 October 2021	22 April 2022
Total	38	21	12	5	55	20	+35	55.26			18 September 2021	26 June 2022

Source: Competitions

=== Ligue 1 ===
==== First round ====
Group A

===== League table =====
Pos	Team	Pld	W	D	L	GF	GA	GD	Pts	Qualification or relegation
1	Espérance de Tunis	14	8	3	3	20	7	+13	27	Advance to Playoff
2	Club Sfaxien	14	6	3	5	12	10	+2	21	Advance to Playoff
3	Union de Ben Guerdane	14	5	6	3	10	8	+2	21	Advance to Playoff
4	Union de Tataouine	14	6	3	5	13	15	−2	21	Qualification for Ranking games
5	Club Bizertin	14	6	1	7	13	15	−2	19	Qualification for Ranking games

Source: Tunisian Football Federation
Rules for classification: 1) points; 2) head-to-head points; 3) head-to-head goal difference; 4) goal difference; 5) total goals; 6) fairplay ranking; 7) playoff.

===== Results by round =====
Round	1	2	3	4	5	6	7	8	9	10	11	12	13	14
Ground	A	H	A	A	H	A	H	H	A	H	H	A	H	A
Result	W	W	W	D	W	L	W	D	L	W	D	L	W	W

Source: Competitive matches
A = Away; H = Home; W = Win; D = Draw; L = Loss

===== Matches =====
Win Draw Loss

27 October 2021 Round 2	Espérance de Tunis	1–0	CS Sfaxien	Tunis
16:30	Tougai 20'	Report		Stadium: Stade Hammadi Agrebi; Attendance: 0 (close doors); Referee: Youssef Sraïri

30 October 2021 Round 3	CA Bizertin	1–2	Espérance de Tunis	Bizerte
14:30	Dembélé 20'	Report	Boudrama 51' (o.g.); Coulibaly 62'	Stadium: Stade Ahmed Bsiri; Attendance: 0 (close doors); Referee: Fredj Abdellaoui

3 November 2021 Round 4	US Ben Guerdane	0–0	Espérance de Tunis	Ben Guerdane
14:30		Report		Stadium: Stade du 7 Mars; Attendance: 0 (close doors); Referee: Amir Loussif

6 November 2021 Round 5	Espérance de Tunis	2–0	CS Hammam-Lif	Tunis
16:30	Marzouki 33'; Elhouni 55'	Report		Stadium: Stade Hammadi Agrebi; Attendance: 0 (close doors); Referee: Haythem Guirat

19 November 2021 Round 6	US Tataouine	2–1	Espérance de Tunis	Tataouine
14:00	Touj 42'; Zoghlami 62'	Report	Chaalali 90+3'	Stadium: Stade Municipal Bir Lahmar; Referee: Nasrallah Jaouadi

22 November 2021 Round 7	Espérance de Tunis	3–0	ES Métlaoui	Tunis
14:00	Konaté 11'; Coulibaly 44'; Mimouni 48'	Report		Stadium: Stade El Menzah; Referee: Oussama Razgallah

25 November 2021 Round 1	ES Hammam-Sousse	0–1	Espérance de Tunis	Sousse
14:00		Report	Mimouni 37'	Stadium: Stade Bou Ali Lahouar; Referee: Amir Ayadi

2 March 2022 Round 8	Espérance de Tunis	0–0	ES Hammam-Sousse	Tunis
14:00		Report		Stadium: Stade Hammadi Agrebi; Referee: Jalel Sahbani

6 March 2022 Round 9	CS Sfaxien	1–0	Espérance de Tunis	Sfax
14:00	Harzi 12' (pen.)	Report		Stadium: Stade Taïeb Mhiri; Referee: Haythem Kossai

9 March 2022 Round 10	Espérance de Tunis	4–0	CA Bizertin	Tunis
14:00	Ben Hammouda 57', 63'; Arfaoui 77'; Berrima 90+4'	Report		Stadium: Stade Hammadi Agrebi; Referee: Walid Jeridi

16 March 2022 Round 11	Espérance de Tunis	0–0	US Ben Guerdane	Tunis
14:00		Report		Stadium: Stade Hammadi Agrebi; Referee: Haythem Guirat

6 April 2022 Round 12	CS Hammam-Lif	2–1	Espérance de Tunis	Tunis
13:30	Ben Salem 2'; Selmi 80'	Report	Bougrine 8'	Stadium: Stade Bou Kornine; Referee: Badis Ben Salah

10 April 2022 Round 13	Espérance de Tunis	3–0	US Tataouine	Tunis
13:30	Ben Hammouda 16', 52'; Fedaa 86'	Report		Stadium: Stade Hammadi Agrebi; Referee: Oussama Razgallah

18 April 2022 Round 14	ES Métlaoui	1–2	Espérance de Tunis	Métlaoui
13:30	Kacem 90+5'	Report	Koffi 70'; Marzouki 85'	Stadium: Stade Municipal de Métlaoui; Referee: Walid Jeridi

==== Playoff ====
===== League table =====
Pos	Team	Pld	W	D	L	GF	GA	GD	Pts	Qualification
1	Espérance de Tunis (C)	10	6	3	1	16	8	+8	24 (Note: Club Africain and Espérance de Tunis were added 3 points (1st of the groups in the first round).)	Qualification for Champions League
2	Union Monastirienne	10	6	2	2	16	9	+7	22 (Note: Club Sfaxien and Union Monastirienne were added 2 points (2nd of the groups in the first round).)	Qualification for Champions League
3	Club Sfaxien	10	3	5	2	10	7	+3	16	Qualification for Confederation Cup
4	Club Africain	10	3	3	4	6	10	−4	15	Qualification for Confederation Cup
5	Étoile du Sahel	10	3	3	4	13	11	+2	13 (Note: Étoile du Sahel and Union de Ben Guerdane were added 1 point (3rd of the groups in the first round).)	

Source: Tunisian Football Federation
Rules for classification: 1) points; 2) head-to-head points; 3) head-to-head goal difference; 4) goal difference; 5) total goals; 6) fairplay ranking; 7) playoff.
(C) Champions

===== Results by round =====
Round	1	2	3	4	5	6	7	8	9	10
Ground	H	H	A	H	A	A	A	H	A	H
Result	W	W	D	W	W	D	L	W	D	W
Position	1	1	1	1	1	1	1	1	1	1

Source: Competitive matches
A = Away; H = Home; W = Win; D = Draw; L = Loss

===== Matches =====
Win Draw Loss

29 April 2022 Round 1	Espérance de Tunis	2–1	CS Sfaxien	Tunis
13:30	Ben Romdhane 24' (pen.); Ben Hammouda 85'	Report	Diakhité 45+2'	Stadium: Stade Hammadi Agrebi; Referee: Ameur Chouchane

3 May 2022 Round 2	Espérance de Tunis	1–0	US Monastir	Tunis
16:00	Ben Romdhane 78' (pen.)	Report		Stadium: Stade Hammadi Agrebi; Referee: Nidhal Letaief

8 May 2022 Round 3	Club Africain	0–0	Espérance de Tunis	Tunis
16:00		Report		Stadium: Stade Hammadi Agrebi; Referee: Mehrez Melki

15 May 2022 Round 4	Espérance de Tunis	1–0	Étoile du Sahel	Tunis
16:00	Bouazra 12' (o.g.)	Report		Stadium: Stade Hammadi Agrebi; Referee: Nidhal Letaief

19 May 2022 Round 5	US Ben Guerdane	0–3	Espérance de Tunis	Tunis
16:00		Report	Ben Romdhane 35'; Tougai 62'; Mimouni 87'	Stadium: Stade Hammadi Agrebi; Referee: Yosri Bouali

22 May 2022 Round 6	CS Sfaxien	1–1	Espérance de Tunis	Sfax
16:00	Dagdoug 31'	Report	Ben Romdhane 90+1'	Stadium: Stade Taïeb Mhiri; Referee: Haythem Guirat

26 May 2022 Round 7	US Monastir	3–2	Espérance de Tunis	Monastir
16:00	Chikhaoui 36'; Aloui 74'; Amokrane 83'	Report	Elhouni 4'; Ben Hammouda 46'	Stadium: Stade Mustapha Ben Jannet; Referee: Mehrez Melki

19 June 2022 Round 8	Espérance de Tunis	3–1	Club Africain	Tunis
17:00	Tougai 20'; Coulibaly 44'; Elhouni 90+2'	Report	Dhaouadi 34' (pen.)	Stadium: Stade Hammadi Agrebi; Referee: Haythem Guirat

23 June 2022 Round 9	Étoile du Sahel	1–1	Espérance de Tunis	Sousse
17:00	Benayada 75' (pen.)	Report	Ben Hammouda 23'	Stadium: Stade Olympique de Sousse; Referee: Nidhal Letaief

26 June 2022 Round 10	Espérance de Tunis	2–1	US Ben Guerdane	Tunis
17:00	Ben Hammouda 85'; Chetti 90+7'	Report	Ouji 6'	Stadium: Stade Hammadi Agrebi; Referee: Oussama Razgallah

==== Results summary ====
Overall								Home						Away					
Pld	W	D	L	GF	GA	GD	Pts	W	D	L	GF	GA	GD	W	D	L	GF	GA	GD
24	14	6	4	36	15	+21	48	10	2	0	22	3	+19	4	4	4	14	12	+2

Source: Competitive matches

NB: As Group A winners, Espérance were added 3 points that are not counted in this summary.

=== Tunisian Cup ===
3 June 2022 Round of 32	ZS Chammakh	0–3	Espérance de Tunis	Zarzis
16:00		Report	Ben Hammouda 31', 51'; Badri 55' (pen.)	Stadium: Stade de Chammakh; Referee: Badis Ben Salah

8 June 2022 Round of 16	CS M'saken	1–1 (a.e.t.) (6–5 p)	Espérance de Tunis	M'saken
16:00	S. Rebai 75'	Report	Ben Hammouda 56'	Stadium: Stade du Rugby M'saken; Referee: Walid Jeridi
	Penalties
	A. Rebai (penalty scored); Gasmi (penalty scored); F. Ajroudi (penalty scored); Bokri (penalty scored); Ajroudi (penalty missed); Boukadida (penalty scored); I. Biili (penalty scored)		(penalty missed) Ben Hammouda; (penalty scored) Ben Hamida; (penalty scored) Mimouni; (penalty scored) Amamou; (penalty scored) Fedaa; (penalty scored) Chetti; (penalty missed) Chabbar

=== 2019–20 Tunisian Super Cup ===
18 September 2021	Espérance de Tunis	1–1 (3–5 p)	US Monastir	Tunis
17:30	Ben Romdhane 4'	Report	Tka 31'	Stadium: Stade Hammadi Agrebi; Attendance: 0 (close doors); Referee: Oussama Razgallah
	Penalties
	Ben Romdhane (penalty scored); Chaalali (penalty missed); Chemmam (penalty scored); Bedrane (penalty scored)		(penalty scored) Oumarou; (penalty scored) Tka; (penalty scored) Ben Seghaier; (penalty scored) Jelassi; (penalty scored) Abdelli

=== 2020–21 Tunisian Super Cup ===
25 September 2021	Espérance de Tunis	1–0	CS Sfaxien	Tunis
17:30	Iwuala 57'	Report		Stadium: Stade Hammadi Agrebi; Attendance: 0 (close doors); Referee: Amir Loussif

=== Champions League ===
==== Qualifying rounds ====
===== Second round =====
17 October 2021 First leg	Al Ittihad (Libya)	0–0	(Tunisia) Espérance de Tunis	Benghazi
19:00 UTC+2		Report		Stadium: Benina Martyrs Stadium; Referee: Antoine Essouma (Cameroon)

24 October 2021 Second leg	Espérance de Tunis (Tunisia)	1–0 (1–0 agg.)	(Libya) Al Ittihad	Tunis
17:00 UTC+1	Ben Khalifa 63'	Report		Stadium: Stade Hammadi Agrebi; Referee: Ibrahim Nour El Din (Egypt)

==== Group stage ====
===== Group C =====
Pos	Team	Pld	W	D	L	GF	GA	GD	Pts	Qualification	EST	CRB	ESS	GAL
1	(Tunisia) Espérance de Tunis	6	4	2	0	12	2	+10	14	Advance to knockout stage	—	2–1	0–0	4–0
2	(Algeria) CR Belouizdad	6	3	2	1	10	5	+5	11	Advance to knockout stage	1–1	—	2–0	4–1
3	(Tunisia) Étoile du Sahel	6	1	3	2	4	7	−3	6		0–2	0–0	—	3–2
4	(Botswana) Jwaneng Galaxy	6	0	1	5	5	17	−12	1		0–3	1–2	1–1	—

Source: CAF

12 February 2022 Matchday 1	Espérance de Tunis (Tunisia)	4–0	(Botswana) Jwaneng Galaxy	Tunis
14:00 UTC+1	Ben Romdhane 1', 29', 32'; Eduwo 86'	Report		Stadium: Stade Hammadi Agrebi; Referee: Issa Sy (Senegal)

19 February 2022 Matchday 2	CR Belouizdad (Algeria)	1–1	(Tunisia) Espérance de Tunis	Algiers (Note: CR Belouizdad play their group stage home matches at Stade du 5 Juillet, Algiers, instead of their regular home stadium Stade du 20 Août, Algiers, which did not meet CAF requirements.)
20:00 UTC+1	Aribi 15' (pen.)	Report	Machmoum 82'	Stadium: Stade du 5 Juillet; Referee: Mohamed Adel (Egypt)

26 February 2022 Matchday 3	Espérance de Tunis (Tunisia)	0–0	(Tunisia) Étoile du Sahel	Tunis
14:00 UTC+1		Report		Stadium: Stade Hammadi Agrebi; Referee: Bakary Gassama (Gambia)

12 March 2022 Matchday 4	Étoile du Sahel (Tunisia)	0–2	(Tunisia) Espérance de Tunis	Tunis (Note: Étoile du Sahel play their home matches at Stade Hammadi Agrebi, Tunis, instead of their regular home stadium Stade Olympique de Sousse, Sousse, which is undergoing renovation.)
14:00 UTC+1		Report	Bedrane 66'; Ben Romdhane 77'	Stadium: Stade Hammadi Agrebi; Referee: Mohamed Marouf Eid Mansour (Egypt)

19 March 2022 Matchday 5	Jwaneng Galaxy (Botswana)	0–3	(Tunisia) Espérance de Tunis	Francistown
18:00 UTC+2		Report	Eduwo 13', 64'; Iwuala 31'	Stadium: Francistown Stadium; Referee: Pierre Atcho (Gabon)

2 April 2022 Matchday 6	Espérance de Tunis (Tunisia)	2–1	(Algeria) CR Belouizdad	Tunis
22:00 UTC+1	Bougrine 13'; Iwuala 17'	Report	Mrezigue 2'	Stadium: Stade Hammadi Agrebi; Referee: Abdel Aziz Mohamed Bouh (Mauritania)

==== Knockout stage ====
===== Quarter-finals =====
15 April 2022 First leg	ES Sétif (Algeria)	0–0	(Tunisia) Espérance de Tunis	Algiers (Note: ES Sétif play their group stage home matches at Stade du 5 Juillet, Algiers, instead of their regular home stadium Stade 8 Mai 1945, Sétif, which did not meet CAF requirements.)
22:00 UTC+1		Report		Stadium: Stade du 5 Juillet; Attendance: 20.000; Referee: Victor Gomes (South Africa)

22 April 2022 Second leg	Espérance de Tunis (Tunisia)	0–1 (0–1 agg.)	(Algeria) ES Sétif	Tunis
22:00 UTC+1		Report	Djabou 21'	Stadium: Stade Hammadi Agrebi; Attendance: 0 (close doors); Referee: Redouane Jiyed (Morocco)

== Statistics ==
=== Playing statistics ===
No.	Pos	Nat	Player	Total		Ligue 1		Tunisian Cup		Champions League		Super Cup	
No.	Pos	Nat	Player	Apps	Goals	Apps	Goals	Apps	Goals	Apps	Goals	Apps	Goals
1	GK	(Tunisia) TUN	Moez Ben Cherifia	23	0	9	0	2	0	10	0	2	0
2	DF	(Tunisia) TUN	Sameh Derbali	2	0	1	0	1	0	0	0	0	0
3	FW	(Tunisia) TUN	Rached Arfaoui	26	1	13	1	2	0	9	0	2	0
4	DF	(Algeria) ALG	Mohamed Amine Tougai	30	3	20	3	0	0	10	0	0	0
5	MF	(Tunisia) TUN	Mohamed Ali Ben Romdhane	32	9	21	4	0	0	9	4	2	1
6	DF	(Tunisia) TUN	Mohamed Ali Yacoubi	4	0	3	0	0	0	0	0	1	0
7	FW	(Tunisia) TUN	Alaeddine Marzouki	21	2	15	2	2	0	3	0	1	0
8	FW	(Tunisia) TUN	Anice Badri	11	1	9	0	2	1	0	0	0	0
9	FW	(Tunisia) TUN	Zied Berrima	7	1	6	1	1	0	0	0	0	0
10	FW	(Libya) LBA	Hamdou Elhouni	25	3	16	3	0	0	8	0	1	0
11	MF	(Morocco) MAR	Sabir Bougrine	17	2	10	1	0	0	7	1	0	0
12	DF	(Tunisia) TUN	Khalil Chemmam	13	0	9	0	0	0	2	0	2	0
14	FW	(Nigeria) NGR	Kingsley Eduwo	20	3	12	0	0	0	8	3	0	0
15	MF	(Ivory Coast) CIV	Fousseny Coulibaly	31	3	22	3	0	0	9	0	0	0
16	GK	(Tunisia) TUN	Farouk Ben Mustapha	4	0	3	0	0	0	0	0	1	0
17	FW	(Nigeria) NGR	Anayo Iwuala	31	3	19	0	0	0	10	2	2	1
19	GK	(Tunisia) TUN	Mohamed Sedki Debchi	12	0	12	0	0	0	0	0	0	0
20	DF	(Tunisia) TUN	Mohamed Amine Ben Hamida	27	0	16	0	2	0	7	0	2	0
21	FW	(Ivory Coast) CIV	David Koffi	5	1	3	1	0	0	2	0	0	0
22	DF	(Tunisia) TUN	Hani Amamou	13	0	8	0	2	0	3	0	0	0
23	DF	(Algeria) ALG	Ilyes Chetti	21	1	16	1	1	0	4	0	0	0
24	MF	(Tunisia) TUN	Fedi Ben Choug	8	0	4	0	2	0	0	0	2	0
25	MF	(Tunisia) TUN	Ghailene Chaalali	29	1	17	1	0	0	10	0	2	0
26	MF	(Tunisia) TUN	Montassar Triki	14	0	8	0	2	0	3	0	1	0
28	MF	(Tunisia) TUN	Mohamed Amine Meskini	3	0	1	0	0	0	0	0	2	0
29	DF	(Tunisia) TUN	Zied Machmoum	21	1	14	0	2	0	5	1	0	0
30	DF	(Algeria) ALG	Abdelkader Bedrane	22	1	13	0	0	0	7	1	2	0
31	GK	(Tunisia) TUN	Wassim Karoui	2	0	1	0	1	0	0	0	0	0
32	DF	(Tunisia) TUN	Raed Fedaa	23	1	17	1	2	0	4	0	0	0
33	FW	(Tunisia) TUN	Farouk Mimouni	16	3	12	3	2	0	2	0	0	0
34	DF	(Tunisia) TUN	Bilel Chabbar	8	0	2	0	2	0	2	0	2	0
35	MF	(Tunisia) TUN	Ghaith Ouahabi	2	0	2	0	0	0	0	0	0	0
37	FW	(Tunisia) TUN	Mohamed Ali Ben Hammouda	17	11	11	8	2	3	4	0	0	0
	DF	(Tunisia) TUN	Ghassen Mahersi	1	0	1	0	0	0	0	0	0	0
	FW	(Tunisia) TUN	Aziz Abid	1	0	1	0	0	0	0	0	0	0
	MF	(Tunisia) TUN	Malek Mehri	2	0	1	0	1	0	0	0	0	0
	DF	(Tunisia) TUN	Raed Bouchniba	1	0	1	0	0	0	0	0	0	0
	MF	(Tunisia) TUN	Khalil Guenichi	3	0	2	0	1	0	0	0	0	0
	DF	(Tunisia) TUN	Abderrazak Ben Ammar	1	0	0	0	1	0	0	0	0	0
	FW	(Ghana) GHA	Percious Boah‡	1	0	0	0	0	0	0	0	1	0
	FW	(Senegal) SEN	Moussa Konaté‡	5	1	5	1	0	0	0	0	0	0
	MF	(Ivory Coast) CIV	Cedrik Gbo‡	2	0	0	0	0	0	0	0	2	0
	FW	(Switzerland) SUI	Nassim Ben Khalifa‡	6	1	2	0	0	0	3	1	1	0

Source: Soccerway

- ^{‡} Player left the club mid-season

=== Goals ===
Rank	Player	Ligue 1	Tunisian Cup	Champions League	Super Cup	Total
1	(Tunisia) Mohamed Ali Ben Hammouda	8	3	0	0	11
2	(Tunisia) Mohamed Ali Ben Romdhane	4	0	4	1	9
3	(Nigeria) Kingsley Eduwo	0	0	3	0	3
3	(Nigeria) Anayo Iwuala	0	0	2	1	3
3	(Tunisia) Farouk Mimouni	3	0	0	0	3
3	(Algeria) Mohamed Amine Tougai	3	0	0	0	3
3	(Ivory Coast) Fousseny Coulibaly	3	0	0	0	3
3	(Libya) Hamdou Elhouni	3	0	0	0	3
9	(Tunisia) Alaeddine Marzouki	2	0	0	0	2
9	(Morocco) Sabir Bougrine	1	0	1	0	2
11	(Switzerland) Nassim Ben Khalifa	0	0	1	0	1
11	(Tunisia) Ghailene Chaalali	1	0	0	0	1
11	(Senegal) Moussa Konaté	1	0	0	0	1
11	(Tunisia) Zied Machmoum	0	0	1	0	1
11	(Tunisia) Rached Arfaoui	1	0	0	0	1
11	(Tunisia) Zied Berrima	1	0	0	0	1
11	(Algeria) Abdelkader Bedrane	0	0	1	0	1
11	(Tunisia) Raed Fedaa	1	0	0	0	1
11	(Ivory Coast) David Koffi	1	0	0	0	1
11	(Tunisia) Anice Badri	0	1	0	0	1
11	(Algeria) Ilyes Chetti	1	0	0	0	1
Own goals		2	0	0	0	2
Total		36	4	13	2	55
