= 2019–20 Tunisian Super Cup =

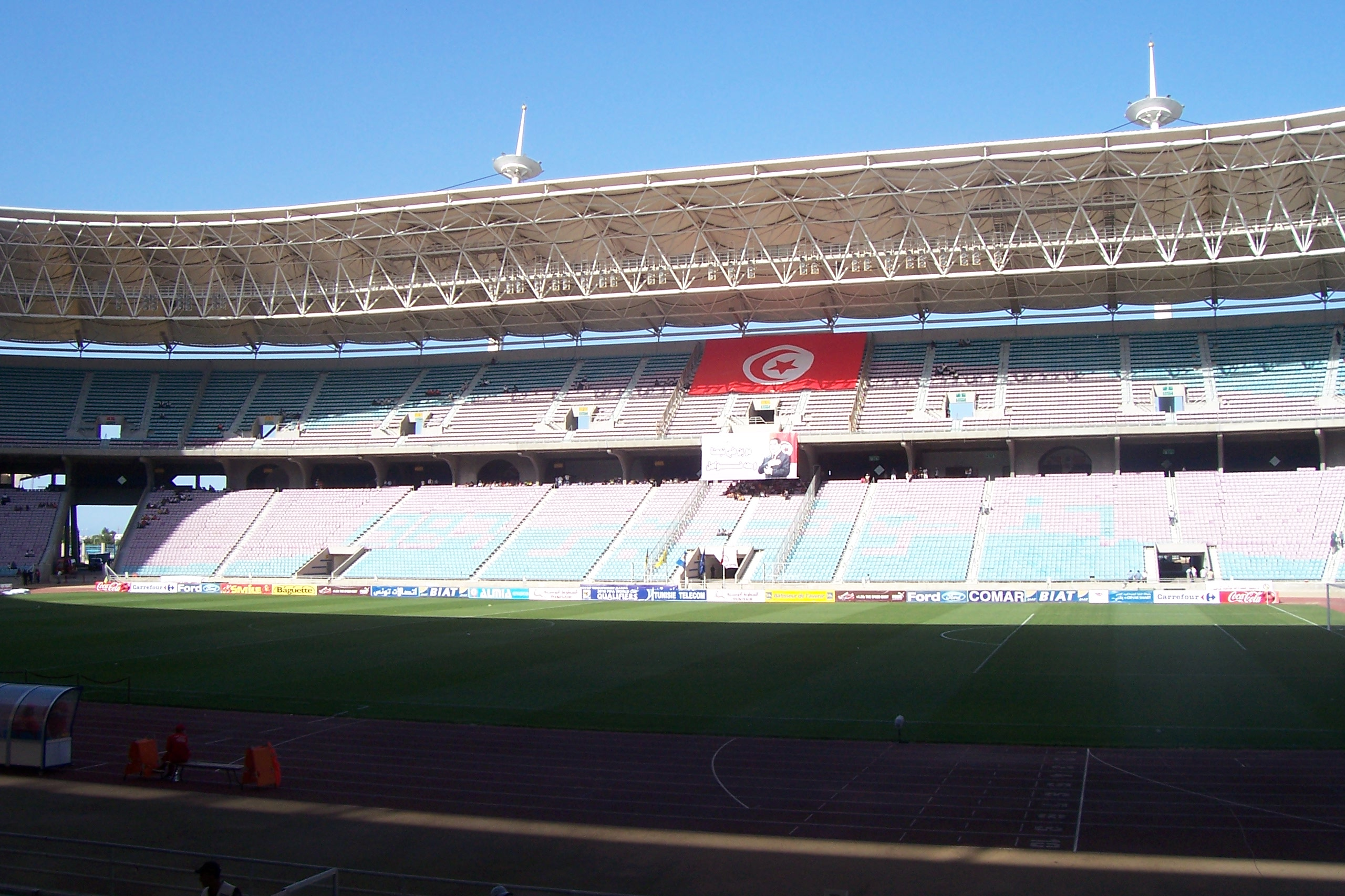
- Hammadi Agrebi Stadium hosted the match
Espérance de Tunis	US Monastir
Ligue 1	Tunisian Cup
1	1
- Union Monastirienne won 5–3 on penalties
- Date: 18 September 2021
- Venue: Stade Hammadi Agrebi, Tunis
- Referee: Oussama Razgallah
- Attendance: 0 (close doors) (Note: The match was played behind closed doors due to the COVID-19 pandemic in Tunisia.)

The 2019–20 Tunisian Super Cup was the 16th edition of the Tunisian Super Cup. The match was contested between the 2019–20 Tunisian Ligue Professionnelle 1 champions, Espérance de Tunis and the 2019–20 Tunisian Cup winners, US Monastir. The match took place at Stade Hammadi Agrebi in Tunis on 18 September 2021 with Union Monastirienne winning on penalties after a 1–1 draw.

== Venue ==
Hammadi Agrebi Stadium, formerly known as 7 November Stadium is a multi-purpose stadium in Radès, Tunis, Tunisia about 10 kilometers south-east of the city center of Tunis, in the center of the Olympic City. It is currently used mostly for football matches and it also has facilities for athletics. The stadium holds 60,000 and was built in 2001 for the 2001 Mediterranean Games and is considered to be one of the best stadiums in Africa.

== Match details ==
18 September 2021
17:30

Espérance de Tunis	1–1	US Monastir
Ben Romdhane 4'	Report	Ho. Tka 31'
Penalties
Ben Romdhane (penalty scored); Chaalali (penalty missed); Chemmam (penalty scored); Bedrane (penalty scored)	3–5	(penalty scored) Oumarou; (penalty scored) Ho. Tka; (penalty scored) Ben Seghaier; (penalty scored) Jelassi; (penalty scored) Abdelli

Stade Hammadi Agrebi, Tunis
Attendance: 0 (close doors)
Referee: Oussama Razgallah

GK	1	(Tunisia) Moez Ben Cherifia		(substituted off) 90+1'
DF	20	(Tunisia) Mohamed Amine Ben Hamida
DF	12	(Tunisia) Khalil Chemmam (c)	(yellow card) 82'
DF	30	(Algeria) Abdelkader Bedrane
DF	28	(Tunisia) Mohamed Amine Meskini		(substituted off) 68'
MF	25	(Tunisia) Ghailene Chaalali
MF	35	(Ivory Coast) Cedrik Gbo	(yellow card) 40'	(substituted off) 90+2'
FW	10	(Libya) Hamdou Elhouni
MF	5	(Tunisia) Mohamed Ali Ben Romdhane
MF	3	(Tunisia) Rached Arfaoui
FW	17	(Nigeria) Anayo Iwuala		(substituted off) 77'
Substitutes :
GK	16	(Tunisia) Farouk Ben Mustapha		(substituted on) 90+1'
DF	34	(Tunisia) Bilel Chabbar		(substituted on) 68'
DF	23	(Algeria) Ilyes Chetti
MF	24	(Tunisia) Fedi Ben Choug		(substituted on) 90+2'
MF	26	(Tunisia) Montassar Triki
FW	33	(Tunisia) Farouk Mimouni
FW	9	(Tunisia) Zied Berrima
FW	21	(Ivory Coast) David Koffi
FW	7	(Tunisia) Alaeddine Marzouki		(substituted on) 77'
Manager :
(Tunisia) Radhi Jaïdi

GK	32	(Tunisia) Bechir Ben Said
DF	7	(Tunisia) Hakim Tka
DF	5	(Ivory Coast) Ousmane Ouattara
DF	15	(Tunisia) Amer El Omrani
DF	30	(Tunisia) Fahmi Ben Romdhane
MF	8	(Tunisia) Houssem Tka
MF	13	(Tunisia) Hamza Jelassi
MF	27	(Niger) Youssef Oumarou	(yellow card) 36'
FW	10	(Tunisia) Idriss Mhirsi	(yellow card) 18'
FW	19	(Tunisia) Zied Aloui		(substituted off) 54'
FW	9	(Tunisia) Youssef Abdelli
Substitutes :
DF	24	(Togo) Roger Aholou
FW	18	(Algeria) Abdelhakim Amokrane
	21	(Tunisia) Hichem Baccar
	11	(Tunisia) Maher Ben Seghaier		(substituted on) 54'
	20	(Tunisia) Omar Bouraoui
MF	28	(France) Haykeul Chikhaoui
	34	(Tunisia) Seifeddine Mahouachi
MF	17	(Tunisia) Khaled Yahia
	12	(Tunisia) Adem Kouraichi
Manager :
(Tunisia) Mourad Okbi

Assistant referees:
Aymen Ismael
Aymen Mellouchi
Fourth official:
Walid Jeridi

Match rules

- 90 minutes.
- Penalty shoot-out if scores level.
- Nine named substitutes, of which up to five may be used.

== Broadcasting ==
Country/Region	Broadcaster
Tunisia	El Watania 1
Middle East and North Africa	Alkass Sports

== See also ==
- 2019–20 Tunisian Ligue Professionnelle 1
- 2019–20 Tunisian Cup
