= 2020–21 Espérance Sportive de Tunis season =

Espérance Sportive de Tunis
2020–21 season
- President: Hamdi Meddeb
- Head coach: Moïne Chaâbani
- Stadium: Stade Hammadi Agrebi
- Ligue 1: Winners
- Tunisian Cup: Round of 32
- Champions League: Semi-finals
- Top goalscorer: League: Taha Yassine Khenissi (7); All: Mohamed Ali Ben Romdhane (10)
- Biggest win: Olympique Béja 1–4 Espérance de Tunis
- Biggest defeat: Al Ahly 3–0 Espérance de Tunis

In the 2020–21 season, Espérance Sportive de Tunis competed in the Ligue 1 for the 66th season, as well as the Tunisian Cup. It was their 66th consecutive season in the top flight of Tunisian football. They competed in Ligue 1, the Champions League and the Tunisian Cup.

== Squad list ==
Players and squad numbers last updated on 18 September 2020.
Note: Flags indicate national team as has been defined under FIFA eligibility rules. Players may hold more than one non-FIFA nationality.

No.	Nat.	Position	Name	Date of birth (age)	Signed from
Goalkeepers
1	(Tunisia)	GK	Moez Ben Cherifia	24 June 1991 (aged 29)	(Tunisia) Youth system
16	(Tunisia)	GK	Farouk Ben Mustapha	1 July 1989 (aged 31)	(Saudi Arabia) Al Shabab
19	(Tunisia)	GK	Mohamed Sedki Debchi	28 October 1999 (aged 21)	(Tunisia) Youth system
Defenders
4	(Algeria)	CB	Mohamed Amine Tougai	22 January 2000 (aged 20)	(Algeria) NA Hussein Dey
6	(Tunisia)	CB	Mohamed Ali Yacoubi	5 October 1990 (aged 30)	(France) US Quevilly-Rouen
12	(Tunisia)	CB	Khalil Chemmam	24 July 1987 (aged 33)	(Tunisia) Youth system
20	(Tunisia)	CB	Amine Ben Hamida	15 December 1995 (aged 25)	(Tunisia) AS Soliman
21	(Tunisia)	RB	Hamdi Nagguez	28 October 1992 (aged 28)	(Lithuania) Sūduva
22	(Tunisia)	RB	Sameh Derbali	23 November 1986 (aged 34)	(Libya) Al Ahli SC
23	(Algeria)	LB	Ilyes Chetti	22 January 1995 (aged 25)	(Algeria) JS Kabylie
26	(Tunisia)	LB	Houcine Rabii	8 November 1991 (aged 29)	(Tunisia) ES Zarzis
30	(Algeria)	CB	Abdelkader Bedrane	2 April 1992 (aged 28)	(Algeria) ES Sétif
34	(Tunisia)	CB	Bilel Chabbar	31 March 2000 (aged 20)	(Tunisia) Youth system
Midfielders
2	(Tunisia)	DM	Badreddine Mouelhi	25 January 1999 (aged 21)	(Tunisia) Youth system
5	(Tunisia)	CM	Mohamed Ali Ben Romdhane	6 September 1999 (aged 21)	(Tunisia) Youth system
15	(Ivory Coast)	DM	Fousseny Coulibaly	10 August 1989 (aged 31)	(Tunisia) Stade tunisien
18	(Algeria)	CB / DM	Raouf Benguit	5 April 1996 (aged 24)	(Algeria) Paradou AC
24	(Tunisia)	AM	Fedi Ben Choug	12 March 1995 (aged 25)	(Tunisia) CA Bizertin
25	(Tunisia)	CM / AM	Ghailene Chaalali	28 February 1994 (aged 26)	(Turkey) Yeni Malatyaspor
28	(Tunisia)	DM	Mohamed Amine Meskini	5 June 1997 (aged 23)	(Tunisia) CS Hammam-Lif
37	(Tunisia)	CM	Montassar Triki	29 August 2001 (aged 19)	(Tunisia) Youth system
40	(Ivory Coast)	DM	Cedrik Gbo	9 September 2002 (aged 18)	(Tunisia) Youth system
Forwards
3	(Ghana)		Basit Abdul Khalid	10 August 1996 (aged 24)	(North Macedonia) FK Makedonija
7	(Tunisia)	AM	Alaeddine Marzouki	3 July 1990 (aged 30)	(Tunisia) CS Sfaxien
8	(Tunisia)		Anice Badri	18 September 1990 (aged 30)	(Saudi Arabia) Al-Ittihad
9	(Tunisia)	FW	Zied Berrima	4 September 2001 (aged 19)	(Tunisia) Youth system
10	(Libya)	LW	Hamdou Elhouni	12 February 1994 (aged 26)	(Portugal) Desportivo das Aves
11	(Tunisia)	FW	Taha Yassine Khenissi	6 January 1992 (aged 28)	(Tunisia) CS Sfax
13	(Switzerland)		Nassim Ben Khalifa	13 January 1992 (aged 28)	(Switzerland) Grasshopper
17	(Algeria)	ST / LW	Abderrahmane Meziane	7 March 1994 (aged 26)	(United Arab Emirates) Al Ain
27	(Tunisia)	LW	Maher Ben Seghaier	22 April 1996 (aged 24)	(Tunisia) CA Bizerte
32	(Tunisia)	RW	Raed Fedaa	20 May 1997 (aged 23)	(Tunisia) Youth system
35	(Ivory Coast)		William Togui	7 August 1996 (aged 24)	(Belgium) Mechelen

== Pre-season ==
12 November 2020 Friendly	Espérance de Tunis	2–2	Stade Tunisien	Tunis
14:00		Report		Stadium: Parc Hassen Belkhodja; Attendance: 0 (close doors)

15 November 2020 Friendly	Espérance de Tunis	2–1	Tunisia under-20	Tunis
14:00		Report		Stadium: Stade El Menzah; Attendance: 0 (close doors)

21 November 2020 Friendly	Espérance de Tunis	3–1	Olympique Béja	Tunis
14:00	Khenissi 10' (pen.); Ben Romdhane 25'	Report	Yacoubi 80' (o.g.)	Stadium: Stade El Menzah; Attendance: 0 (close doors)

== Competitions ==
=== Overview ===
Competition	Record								Started round	Final position / round	First match	Last match
Competition	G	W	D	L	GF	GA	GD	Win %	Started round	Final position / round	First match	Last match
Ligue 1	26	19	3	4	37	16	+21	73.08	—N/a	Winners	6 December 2020	19 May 2021
Tunisian Cup	1	0	0	1	0	1	−1	0.00	Round of 32		26 May 2021	
Champions League	12	5	3	4	14	14	+0	41.67	First round	Semi-finals	23 December 2020	29 June 2021
Total	39	24	6	9	51	31	+20	61.54				

Source: Competitions

== League table ==
Pos	Team	Pld	W	D	L	GF	GA	GD	Pts	Qualification or relegation
1	Espérance de Tunis (C)	26	19	3	4	37	16	+21	60	Qualification for Champions League
2	Étoile du Sahel	26	15	5	6	46	26	+20	50	Qualification for Champions League
3	Union de Ben Guerdane	26	10	11	5	25	16	+9	41	Qualification for Confederation Cup
4	Avenir de Soliman	26	11	7	8	35	34	+1	40	
5	Club Sfaxien	26	10	10	6	29	16	+13	40	Qualification for Confederation Cup as Tunisian Cup winners

Source: soccerway.com
Rules for classification: 1) points; 2) head-to-head points; 3) head-to-head goal difference; 4) goal difference; 5) total goals; 6) fairplay ranking; 7) playoff.
(C) Champions

=== Results summary ===
Overall								Home						Away					
Pld	W	D	L	GF	GA	GD	Pts	W	D	L	GF	GA	GD	W	D	L	GF	GA	GD
26	19	3	4	37	16	+21	60	10	2	1	18	6	+12	9	1	3	19	10	+9

Source: Competitive matches

=== Results by round ===
Round	1	2	3	4	5	6	7	8	9	10	11	12	13	14	15	16	17	18	19	20	21	22	23	24	25	26
Ground	H	A	H	A	H	A	H	A	H	A	H	H	A	A	H	A	H	A	H	A	H	A	H	A	A	H
Result	D	W	W	W	W	W	W	L	W	W	W	W	W	W	W	W	W	L	W	W	D	W	W	D	L	L
Position	7	4	3	1	1	1	1	1	1	1	1	1	1	1	1	1	1	1	1	1	1	1	1	1	1	1

Source: Competitive matches
A = Away; H = Home; W = Win; D = Draw; L = Loss

=== Matches ===
Win Draw Loss

6 December 2020 Round 1	Espérance de Tunis	2–2	AS Soliman	Rades
15:00	Elhouni 7'; Coulibaly 84'	Soccerway report	Durugbor 62'; Brini 69'	Stadium: Stade Hammadi Agrebi; Attendance: 0 (close doors); Referee: Haythem Guirat

13 December 2020 Round 2	US Monastir	0–1	Espérance de Tunis	Monastir
14:00		Soccerway report	Elhouni 72'	Stadium: Stade Mustapha Ben Jannet; Attendance: 0 (close doors); Referee: Walid Jeridi

17 December 2020 Round 3	Espérance de Tunis	1–0	US Tataouine	Rades
16:00	Nagguez 75'	Soccerway report		Stadium: Stade Hammadi Agrebi; Attendance: 0 (close doors); Referee: Haythem Kossaï

27 December 2020 Round 4	US Ben Guerdane	0–1	Espérance de Tunis	Ben Guerdane
14:00		Soccerway report	Ben Romdhane 61'	Stadium: Stade du 7 Mars; Attendance: 0 (close doors); Referee: Mejdi Belhaj Ali

1 January 2021 Round 5	Espérance de Tunis	2–0	Étoile Sportive du Sahel	Rades
16:00	Marzouki 28'; Chaalali 90+3'	Soccerway report		Stadium: Stade Hammadi Agrebi; Attendance: 0 (close doors); Referee: Walid Jeridi

10 January 2021 Round 7	Espérance de Tunis	2–0	AS Rejiche	Rades
14:00	Ben Choug 45'; Marzouki 63'	Soccerway report		Stadium: Stade Hammadi Agrebi; Attendance: 0 (close doors); Referee: Oussama Razgallah

13 January 2021 Round 8	CS Sfaxien	2–0	Espérance de Tunis	Sfax
14:00	Karoui 36'; Kingsley 79'	Soccerway report		Stadium: Stade Taïeb Mhiri; Attendance: 0 (close doors); Referee: Amir Loussif

23 January 2021 Round 9	Espérance de Tunis	2–1	Stade Tunisien	Rades
15:00	Khenissi 37', 56'	Soccerway report	Abata 62'	Stadium: Stade Hammadi Agrebi; Attendance: 0 (close doors)

26 January 2021 Round 10	Olympique Béja	1–4	Espérance de Tunis	Béja
14:00	Bessan 35'	Soccerway report	Benguit 10'; Khenissi 49', 43'; Badri 90+1'	Stadium: Stade Boujemaa Kmiti; Attendance: 0 (close doors); Referee: Haythem Kossaï

31 January 2021 Round 11	Espérance de Tunis	1–0	Club Africain	Rades
16:00	Badri 76'	Soccerway report		Stadium: Stade Hammadi Agrebi; Attendance: 0 (close doors); Referee: Amir Loussif

3 February 2021 Round 12	Espérance de Tunis	1–0	CA Bizertin	Tunis
15:00	Ben Romdhane 47'	Soccerway report		Stadium: Stade El Menzah; Attendance: 0 (close doors); Referee: Nasrallah Jaouadi

7 February 2021 Round 13	ES Métlaoui	1–2	Espérance de Tunis	Métlaoui
13:00	ElBakouch 64' (pen.)	Soccerway report	Fedaa 44'; Badri 89'	Stadium: Stade municipal de Métlaoui; Attendance: 0 (close doors); Referee: Ameur Chouchen

17 February 2021 Round 6	JS Kairouan	0–3	Espérance de Tunis	Kairouan
14:00		Soccerway report	Ben Khalifa 59'; Togui 72'; Badri 76'	Stadium: Stade Hamda Laouani; Attendance: 0 (close doors); Referee: Haythem Guirat

27 February 2021 Round 14	AS Soliman	0–2	Espérance de Tunis	Soliman
14:00		Soccerway report	Khenissi 15'; Togui 87'	Stadium: Stade municipal Attendance: 0 (close doors); Referee: Oussama Ben Ishak

10 March 2021 Round 17	Espérance de Tunis	1–0	US Ben Guerdane	Tunis
14:00	Khenissi 90+5'	Soccerway report		Stadium: Stade El Menzah; Attendance: 0 (close doors); Referee: Youssef Sraïri

13 March 2021 Round 18	Étoile Sportive du Sahel	2–0	Espérance de Tunis	Hammam Sousse
14:00	Sfaxi 4'; Ben Ouanes 51'	Soccerway report		Stadium: Stade Municipal Bou Ali-Lahouar; Attendance: 0 (close doors); Referee: Nidhal Letaïef

21 March 2021 Round 20	AS Rejiche	0–1	Espérance de Tunis	Mahdia
13:00		Soccerway report	Ben Romdhane 81'	Stadium: Stade Ahmed Khouaja; Attendance: 0 (close doors); Referee: Oussama Razgallah

27 March 2021 Round 15	Espérance de Tunis	1–0	US Monastir	Tunis
14:00	Khalid 82'	Soccerway report		Stadium: Stade El Menzah; Attendance: 0 (close doors); Referee: Mejdi Belhadj Ali

7 April 2021 Round 23	Espérance de Tunis	1–0	Olympique Béja	Rades
16:15	Ben Romdhane 19' (pen.)	Soccerway report		Stadium: Stade Hammadi Agrebi; Attendance: 0 (close doors); Referee: Walid Jridi

14 April 2021 Round 16	US Tataouine	1–3	Espérance de Tunis	Tataouine
13:30	Khalfa 69' (pen.)	Soccerway report	Khenissi 27'; Benguit 57'; Elhouni 70'	Stadium: Stade Nejib Khattab; Attendance: 0 (close doors); Referee: Nasralla Jaouadi

18 April 2021 Round 19	Espérance de Tunis	3–1	JS Kairouan	Rades
13:35	Badri 62', 88'; Khalid 63'	Soccerway report	Addemi 73'	Stadium: Stade Hammadi Agrebi; Attendance: 0 (close doors); Referee: Fredj Abdellaoui

25 April 2021 Round 21	Espérance de Tunis	0–0	CS Sfaxien	Rades
13:35		Soccerway report		Stadium: Stade Hammadi Agrebi; Attendance: 0 (close doors); Referee: Ameur Chouchen

1 May 2021 Round 22	Stade Tunisien	0–1	Espérance de Tunis	Le Bardo
13:30		Soccerway report	Bedrane 56'	Stadium: Stade Hédi Enneifer; Attendance: 0 (close doors); Referee: Oussama Razgallah

5 May 2021 Round 24	Club Africain	1–1	Espérance de Tunis	Rades
13:30	Chamakhi 82'	Soccerway report	Ben Romdhane 89' (pen.)	Stadium: Stade Hammadi Agrebi; Attendance: 0 (close doors); Referee: Haythem Kossai

9 May 2021 Round 25	CA Bizertin	2–0	Espérance de Tunis	Bizerte
13:30	Sabou 37'; Balbouz 89'	Soccerway report		Stadium: Stade Ahmed Bsiri; Attendance: 0 (close doors); Referee: Sadok Selmi

19 May 2021 Round 26	Espérance de Tunis	1–2	ES Métlaoui	Rades
14:00	Togui 53'	Soccerway report	Obogo 60'; Timoumi 80'	Stadium: Stade Hammadi Agrebi; Attendance: 0 (close doors); Referee: Nidhal Letaïef

== Tunisian Cup ==
6 May 2021 Round of 32	Espérance de Tunis	0–1	Étoile Sportive du Sahel	Radès
15:00		Report	Mbé 35'	Stadium: Stade Olympique de Radès; Attendance: 0 (close doors); Referee: Aymen Nasri

== Champions League ==
=== First round ===
23 December 2020 First leg	Al Ahly Benghazi (Libya)	0–0	(Tunisia) Espérance de Tunis	Cairo (Egypt) (Note: Teams from Libya play their home matches outside the country due to security concerns from the ongoing civil war.)
18:00 UTC+2		Report		Stadium: Petro Sport Stadium; Attendance: 0 (close doors); Referee: Bamlak Tessema Weyesa (Ethiopia)

6 January 2021 Second leg	Espérance de Tunis (Tunisia)	3–2	(Libya) Al Ahly Benghazi	Rades
15:00 UTC+1	Chaalali 15' (pen.); Ben Romdhane 63'; Marzouki 86'	Report	Alnaeli 60'; Alshaafi 76' (pen.)	Stadium: Stade Hammadi Agrebi; Attendance: 0 (close doors); Referee: Mahmoud El Banna (Egypt)

=== Group stage ===
==== Group D ====
Pos	Team	Pld	W	D	L	GF	GA	GD	Pts	Qualification	EST	MCA	ZAM	TEU
1	(Tunisia) Espérance de Tunis	6	3	2	1	9	6	+3	11	Advance to knockout stage	—	1–1	3–1	2–1
2	(Algeria) MC Alger	6	2	3	1	4	4	0	9	Advance to knockout stage	1–1	—	0–2	1–0
3	(Egypt) Zamalek	6	2	2	2	7	5	+2	8		0–1	0–0	—	4–1
4	(Senegal) Teungueth	6	1	1	4	4	9	−5	4		2–1	0–1	0–0	—

Source: Soccerway

13 February 2021 Matchday 1	Espérance de Tunis (Tunisia)	2–1	(Senegal) Teungueth	Rades
13:00 (14:00 UTC+1)	Khenissi 45' (pen.); Khalid 73'	Report	Sillah 33'	Stadium: Stade Hammadi Agrebi; Attendance: 0 (close doors); Referee: Peter Waweru (Kenya)

23 February 2021 Matchday 2	MC Alger (Algeria)	1–1	(Tunisia) Espérance de Tunis	Algiers
19:00 (20:00 UTC+1)	Bensaha 27'	Report	Benguit 60'	Stadium: Stade du 5 Juillet; Attendance: 0 (close doors); Referee: Rédouane Jiyed (Morocco)

6 March 2021 Matchday 3	Espérance de Tunis (Tunisia)	3–1	(Egypt) Zamalek	Rades
16:00 (17:00 UTC+1)	Togui 26'; Ben Romdhane 45' (pen.), 53'	Report	Abou El Fotouh 39'	Stadium: Stade Hammadi Agrebi; Attendance: 0 (close doors); Referee: Janny Sikazwe (Zambia)

16 March 2021 Matchday 4	Zamalek (Egypt)	0–1	(Tunisia) Espérance de Tunis	Cairo
19:00 (21:00 UTC+2)		Report	Elhouni 73'	Stadium: Cairo International Stadium; Attendance: 0 (close doors); Referee: Jean-Jacques Ndala Ngambo (DR Congo)

2 April 2021 Matchday 5	Teungueth (Senegal)	2–1	(Tunisia) Espérance de Tunis	Thiès
17:00 16:00 UTC+0	Niang 38'; B. D. Diop 72'	Report	Ben Romdhane 28'	Stadium: Stade Lat-Dior; Attendance: 0 (close doors); Referee: Blaise Yuven Ngwa (Cameroon)

10 April 2021 Matchday 6	Espérance de Tunis (Tunisia)	1–1	(Algeria) MC Alger	Rades
16:00 (17:00 UTC+1)	Ben Khalifa 31'	Report	Belkheir 68'	Stadium: Stade Hammadi Agrebi; Attendance: 0 (close doors); Referee: Victor Gomes (South Africa)

=== Knockout stage ===
15 May 2021 Quarter-final 1st leg	CR Belouizdad (Algeria)	2–0	(Tunisia) Espérance de Tunis	Algiers (Note: CR Belouizdad play their home matches at Stade du 5 Juillet, Algiers, instead of their regular home stadium Stade du 20 Août, Algiers, which did not meet CAF requirements.)
16:00 (17:00 UTC+1)	Draoui 35'; Sayoud 82'	Report		Stadium: Stade du 5 Juillet; Attendance: 0 (close doors); Referee: Ndala Ngambo (DR Congo)

22 May 2021 Quarter-final 2nd leg	Espérance de Tunis (Tunisia)	2–0 (3–2 p)	(Algeria) CR Belouizdad	Radès
16:00 (17:00 UTC+1)	Benguit 68'; Ben Romdhane 87'	Report		Stadium: Stade Olympique de Radès; Attendance: 0 (close doors); Referee: Bakary Gassama (Gambia)
	Penalties
	Ben Romdhane (penalty scored); Badri (penalty scored); Chaalali (penalty missed); Benguit (penalty scored)		(penalty missed) Sayoud; (penalty scored) Gasmi; (penalty scored) Draoui; (penalty missed) Djerrar; (penalty missed) Nessakh

19 June 2021 Semi-final 1st leg	Espérance de Tunis (Tunisia)	0–1	(Egypt) Al Ahly	Radès
17:00 (18:00 UTC+1) (Note: The Espérance de Tunis v Al Ahly match, originally scheduled to be played at 17:00 local time (UTC+1), was postponed for one hour due to clashes between Tunisian police officers and Espérance de Tunis fans.)		Report	Sherif 67'	Stadium: Stade Olympique de Radès; Attendance: 5000; Referee: Victor Gomes (South Africa)

26 June 2021 Semi-final 2nd leg	Al Ahly (Egypt)	3–0	(Tunisia) Espérance de Tunis	Cairo
19:00 (21:00 UTC+2)	Maâloul 38' (pen.); Sherif 56'; El Shahat 60'	Report		Stadium: Al Salam Stadium; Attendance: 0 (close doors); Referee: Sidi Alioum (Cameroon)

== Squad information ==
=== Playing statistics ===
No.	Pos	Nat	Player	Total		Ligue 1		Tunisian Cup		Champions League	
No.	Pos	Nat	Player	Apps	Goals	Apps	Goals	Apps	Goals	Apps	Goals
1	GK	(Tunisia) TUN	Moez Ben Cherifia	22	0	14	0	1	0	7	0
16	GK	(Tunisia) TUN	Farouk Ben Mustapha	16	0	10	0	0	0	6	0
19	GK	(Tunisia) TUN	Mohamed Sedki Debchi	1	0	1	0	0	0	0	0
6	DF	(Tunisia) TUN	Mohamed Ali Yacoubi	23	0	15	0	0	0	8	0
12	DF	(Tunisia) TUN	Khalil Chemmam	16	0	12	0	1	0	3	0
20	DF	(Tunisia) TUN	Amine Ben Hamida	21	0	13	0	0	0	8	0
22	DF	(Tunisia) TUN	Sameh Derbali	5	0	3	0	0	0	2	0
30	DF	(Algeria) ALG	Abdelkader Bedrane	29	2	16	2	1	0	12	0
20	DF	(Algeria) ALG	Mohamed Amine Tougai	11	0	9	0	0	0	2	0
13	DF	(Tunisia) TUN	Raed Fedaa	14	0	10	0	1	0	3	0
33	DF	(Tunisia) TUN	Farouk Mimouni	5	0	5	0	0	0	0	0
21	DF	(Tunisia) TUN	Hamdi Nagguez	34	1	22	1	1	0	11	0
26	DF	(Algeria) ALG	Ilyes Chetti	25	0	14	0	1	0	10	0
7	MF	(Tunisia) TUN	Alaeddine Marzouki	23	3	20	2	0	0	3	1
15	MF	(Ivory Coast) CIV	Fousseny Coulibaly	31	1	19	1	1	0	11	0
17	MF	(Algeria) ALG	Abderrahmane Meziane	18	0	15	0	0	0	3	0
18	MF	(Algeria) ALG	Raouf Benguit	32	4	20	2	1	0	11	2
27	MF	(Tunisia) TUN	Mohamed Ali Ben Romdhane	35	10	23	5	1	0	11	5
28	MF	(Tunisia) TUN	Mohamed Amine Meskini	7	0	6	0	0	0	1	0
	MF	(Tunisia) TUN	Youssef Mosrati	0	0	0	0	0	0	0	0
24	MF	(Tunisia) TUN	Fedi Ben Choug	13	1	12	1	0	0	1	0
25	MF	(Tunisia) TUN	Ghailene Chaalali	18	2	11	1	1	0	6	1
26	MF	(Tunisia) TUN	Houcine Errabei	7	0	6	0	0	0	1	0
27	FW	(Tunisia) TUN	Maher Ben Seghaier	1	0	1	0	0	0	0	0
2	FW	(Tunisia) TUN	Mohamed Ali Ben Hammouda	9	0	7	0	0	0	2	0
3	FW	(Ghana) GHA	Basit Abdul Khalid	24	3	13	2	1	0	10	1
8	FW	(Tunisia) TUN	Anice Badri	27	6	16	6	1	0	10	0
10	FW	(Libya) LBA	Hamdou Elhouni	24	4	12	3	1	0	11	1
11	FW	(Tunisia) TUN	Taha Yassine Khenissi	30	8	21	7	0	0	9	1
13	FW	(Switzerland) SUI	Nassim Ben Khalifa	16	2	12	1	1	0	3	1
14	FW	(Tunisia) TUN	Youssef Abdelli	0	0	0	0	0	0	0	0
16	FW	(Tunisia) TUN	Zied Berrima	3	0	3	0	0	0	0	0
35	FW	(Ivory Coast) CIV	William Togui	19	4	9	3	1	0	9	1
40	FW	(Ivory Coast) CIV	Cedrik Gbo	11	0	10	0	0	0	1	0
	FW	(Tunisia) TUN	Badra Mouelhi	1	0	1	0	0	0	0	0
Players transferred out during the season

Source: fr.soccerway.com

=== Goalscorers ===
Includes all competitive matches. The list is sorted alphabetically by surname when total goals are equal.

No.	Nat.	Player	Pos.	L 1	TC	SC	CL 1	TOTAL
5	(Tunisia)	Mohamed Ali Ben Romdhane	CM	5	0	0	5	10
11	(Tunisia)	Taha Yassine Khenissi	FW	7	0	0	1	8
8	(Tunisia)	Anice Badri	FW	6	0	0	0	6
17	(Libya)	Hamdou Elhouni	LW	3	0	0	1	4
35	(Ivory Coast)	William Togui	FW	3	0	0	1	4
18	(Algeria)	Raouf Benguit	CB/DM	2	0	0	2	4
7	(Tunisia)	Alaeddine Marzouki	AM	2	0	0	1	3
3	(Ghana)	Basit Abdul Khalid	FW	2	0	0	1	3
30	(Algeria)	Abdelkader Bedrane	CB	2	0	0	0	2
25	(Tunisia)	Ghailene Chaalali	AM	1	0	0	1	2
13	(Tunisia)	Nassim Ben Khalifa	FW	1	0	0	1	2
15	(Ivory Coast)	Fousseny Coulibaly	DM	1	0	0	0	1
21	(Tunisia)	Hamdi Nagguez	RB	1	0	0	0	1
24	(Tunisia)	Fedi Ben Choug	RW	1	0	0	0	1
Own Goals				0	0	0	0	0
Totals				37	0	0	14	51

== Transfers ==
=== In ===
Date	Pos	Player	From club	Transfer fee	Source
2 July 2020	RB	(Tunisia) Hamdi Nagguez	(Lithuania) Sūduva	Free transfer	
10 July 2020	CM / AM	(Tunisia) Ghailene Chaalali	(Turkey) Yeni Malatyaspor	Free transfer	
28 August 2020	AM	(Tunisia) Alaeddine Marzouki	CS Sfaxien	Free transfer	
27 October 2020	GK	(Tunisia) Farouk Ben Mustapha	(Saudi Arabia) Al Shabab	Free transfer	
20 November 2020	FW	(Tunisia) Nassim Ben Khalifa	(Switzerland) Grasshopper	Free transfer	
18 January 2021	FW	(Tunisia) Anice Badri	(Saudi Arabia) Al-Ittihad	Free transfer	
25 January 2021	FW	(Ghana) Basit Abdul Khalid	(North Macedonia) FK Makedonija	Free transfer	
31 January 2021	FW	(Ivory Coast) William Togui	(Belgium) Mechelen	Loan for six months	

=== Out ===
Date	Pos	Player	To club	Transfer fee	Source
2 September 2020		(Tunisia) Rayen Mzoughi	US Tataouine	Free transfer	
13 September 2020	CB	(Tunisia) Chamseddine Dhaouadi	(Qatar) Al-Shamal	Free transfer	
30 September 2020	RB	(Tunisia) Iheb Mbarki	(Egypt) Wadi Degla	Free transfer	
16 October 2020		(Tunisia) Kabil Othmani	AS Soliman	Free transfer	
22 October 2020	LW	(Algeria) Billel Bensaha	(Algeria) MC Alger	Loan for one year	
24 October 2020	FW	(Tunisia) Naceur Atoui	AS Soliman	Free transfer	
24 October 2020	MF	(Tunisia) Alaâ Ben Salah	AS Soliman	Free transfer	
24 October 2020	DF	(Tunisia) Rayen Yaakoubi	AS Soliman	Free transfer	
24 October 2020	RW	(Tunisia) Youssef Abdelli	US Monastir	Free transfer	
9 November 2020	FW	(Ivory Coast) Ibrahim Ouattara	(Libya) Al-Ahly SC	Loan for one year	
12 November 2020	CB	(Tunisia) Afif Jebali	ES Métlaoui	Loan for one year	
4 December 2020	DM	(Ghana) Kwame Bonsu	(Egypt) Cleopatra FC	Free transfer	
3 February 2021	FW	(Algeria) Tayeb Meziani	Étoile Sportive du Sahel	Undisclosed	
