= 2020–21 Tunisian Super Cup =

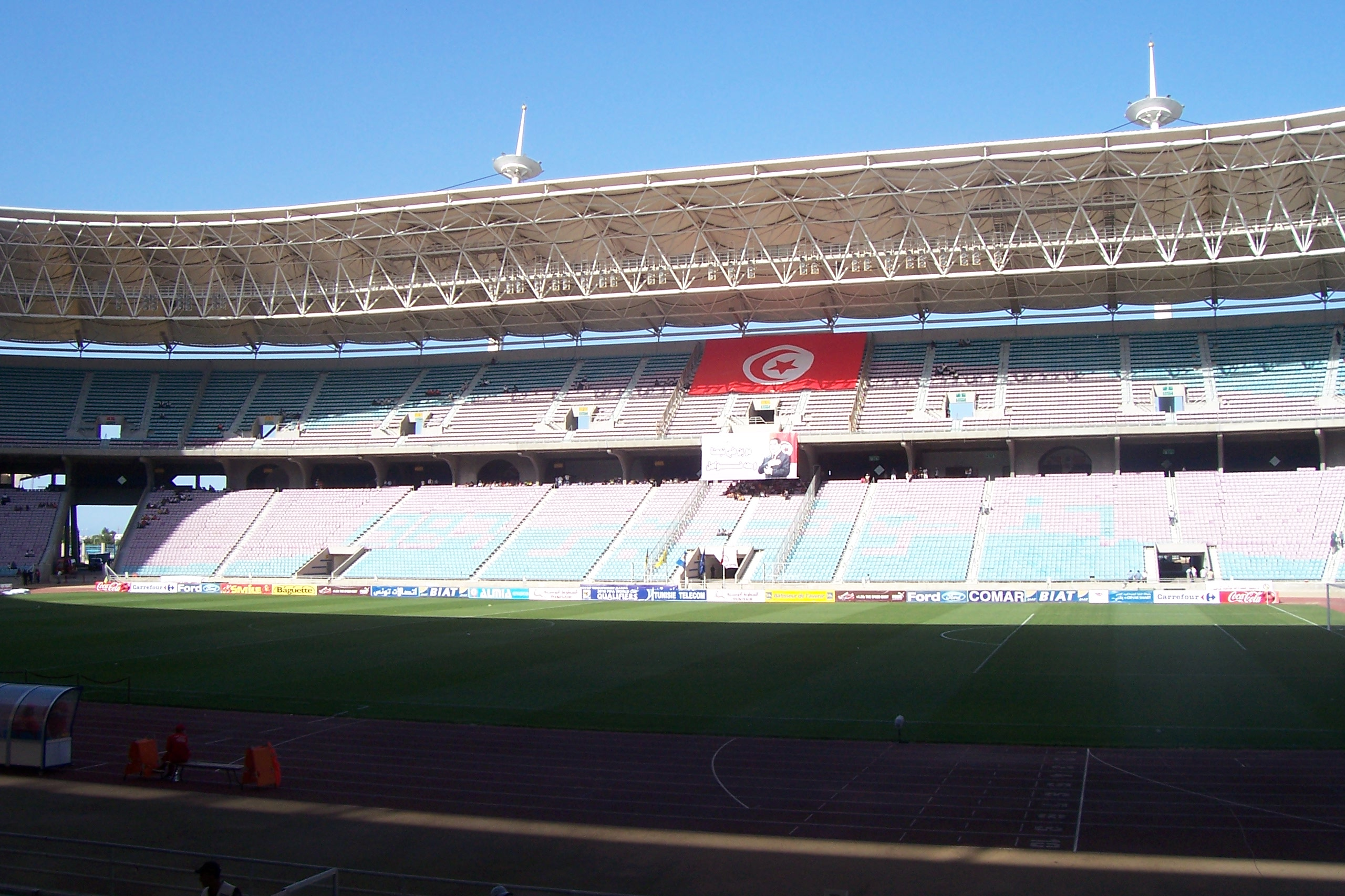
- Stade Hammadi Agrebi hosted the match
Espérance de Tunis	CS Sfaxien
Ligue 1	Tunisian Cup
1	0
- Date: 25 September 2021
- Venue: Stade Hammadi Agrebi, Tunis
- Referee: Amir Loussif
- Attendance: 0 (close doors) (Note: The match was played behind closed doors due to the COVID-19 pandemic in Tunisia.)

The 2020–21 Tunisian Super Cup was the 17th edition of the Tunisian Super Cup. The match was contested by the 2020–21 Tunisian Ligue Professionnelle 1 champions, Espérance de Tunis and the Tunisian Cup winners, CS Sfaxien. The match took place at Stade Hammadi Agrebi in Tunis on 25 September 2021, Espérance de Tunis won the game 1–0.

== Venue ==
Hammadi Agrebi Stadium, formerly known as 7 November Stadium is a multi-purpose stadium in Radès, Tunis, Tunisia about 10 kilometers south-east of the city center of Tunis, in the center of the Olympic City. It is currently used mostly for football matches and it also has facilities for athletics. The stadium holds 60,000 and was built in 2001 for the 2001 Mediterranean Games and is considered to be one of the best stadiums in Africa.

== Match ==
=== Summary ===
Nigerian forward Anayo Iwuala scored the only goal of the game for Espérance de Tunis making it the clubs sixth Super Cup win. This also gave Radhi Jaïdi his first managerial trophy who only took charge of the team one month before in August 2021.

=== Details ===
25 September 2021
17:30

Espérance de Tunis	1–0	CS Sfaxien
Iwuala 57'	Report

Stade Hammadi Agrebi, Tunis
Attendance: 0
Referee: Amir Loussif (Tunisia)

GK	1	(Tunisia) Moez Ben Cherifia
DF	12	(Tunisia) Khalil Chemmam (c)
DF	30	(Algeria) Abdelkader Bedrane
DF	20	(Tunisia) Mohamed Amine Ben Hamida	(yellow card) 66'
DF	34	(Tunisia) Bilel Chabbar		(substituted off) 90+2'
FW	26	(Tunisia) Montassar Triki	(yellow card) 38'	(substituted off) 83'
MF	3	(Tunisia) Rached Arfaoui		(substituted off) 75'
MF	25	(Tunisia) Ghailene Chaalali
DF	5	(Tunisia) Mohamed Ali Ben Romdhane
FW	17	(Nigeria) Anayo Iwuala		(substituted off) 83'
FW	27	(Ghana) Percious Boah		(substituted off) 46'
Substitutes :
FW	13	(Switzerland) Nassim Ben Khalifa		(substituted on) 46'
MF	28	(Tunisia) Mohamed Amine Meskini		(substituted on) 75'
MF	35	(Ivory Coast) Cedrik Gbo		(substituted on) 83'
MF	24	(France) Fedi Ben Choug		(substituted on) 83'
DF	6	(Tunisia) Mohamed Ali Yacoubi		(substituted on) 90+2'
GK	16	(Tunisia) Farouk Ben Mustapha
FW	10	(Libya) Hamdou Elhouni
DF	23	(Algeria) Ilyes Chetti
FW	33	(Tunisia) Farouk Mimouni
Manager :
(Tunisia) Radhi Jaïdi

GK	1	(Tunisia) Mohamed Hedi Gaaloul
DF	21	(Tunisia) Houssem Dagdoug
DF	28	(Tunisia) Mohamed Hamrouni
MF	23	(Tunisia) Chadi Hammami
MF	9	(Iraq) Hussein Ali Al-Saedi
FW	7	(Libya) Mohammed Soulah		(substituted off) 77'
DF	5	(Tunisia) Ghaith Maaroufi		(substituted off) 71'
DF	18	(Tunisia) Alaa Ghram	(yellow card) 30'	(substituted off) 87'
MF	13	(Tunisia) Abdallah Amri		(substituted off) 77'
FW	11	(Tunisia) Hazem Haj Hassen		(substituted off) 71'
FW	22	(Tunisia) Firas Chaouat
Substitutes :
MF	15	(Tunisia) Jassem Hamdouni		(substituted on) 71'
DF	4	(Tunisia) Nour Zamen Zammouri		(substituted on) 71'
FW	33	(Algeria) Hichem Nekkache		(substituted on) 77'
FW	29	(Tunisia) Achref Habbassi		(substituted on) 77'
MF	20	(Algeria) Malik Raiah		(substituted on) 87'
GK	30	(Tunisia) Aymen Dahmen
DF	—	(Tunisia) Abderrahman Toure
DF	3	(Tunisia) Mohamed Nasraoui
MF	14	(Tunisia) Fares Neji
Manager :
(Italy) Giovanni Solinas

Match rules

- 90 minutes.
- Penalty shoot-out if scores level.
- Nine named substitutes, of which up to five may be used.

== Broadcasting ==
Country/Region	Broadcaster
Middle East and North Africa	Alkass Sports

== See also ==
- 2020–21 Tunisian Ligue Professionnelle 1
- 2020–21 Tunisian Cup
