= Mohamed Amine Tougai =

Algerian footballer (born 2000)

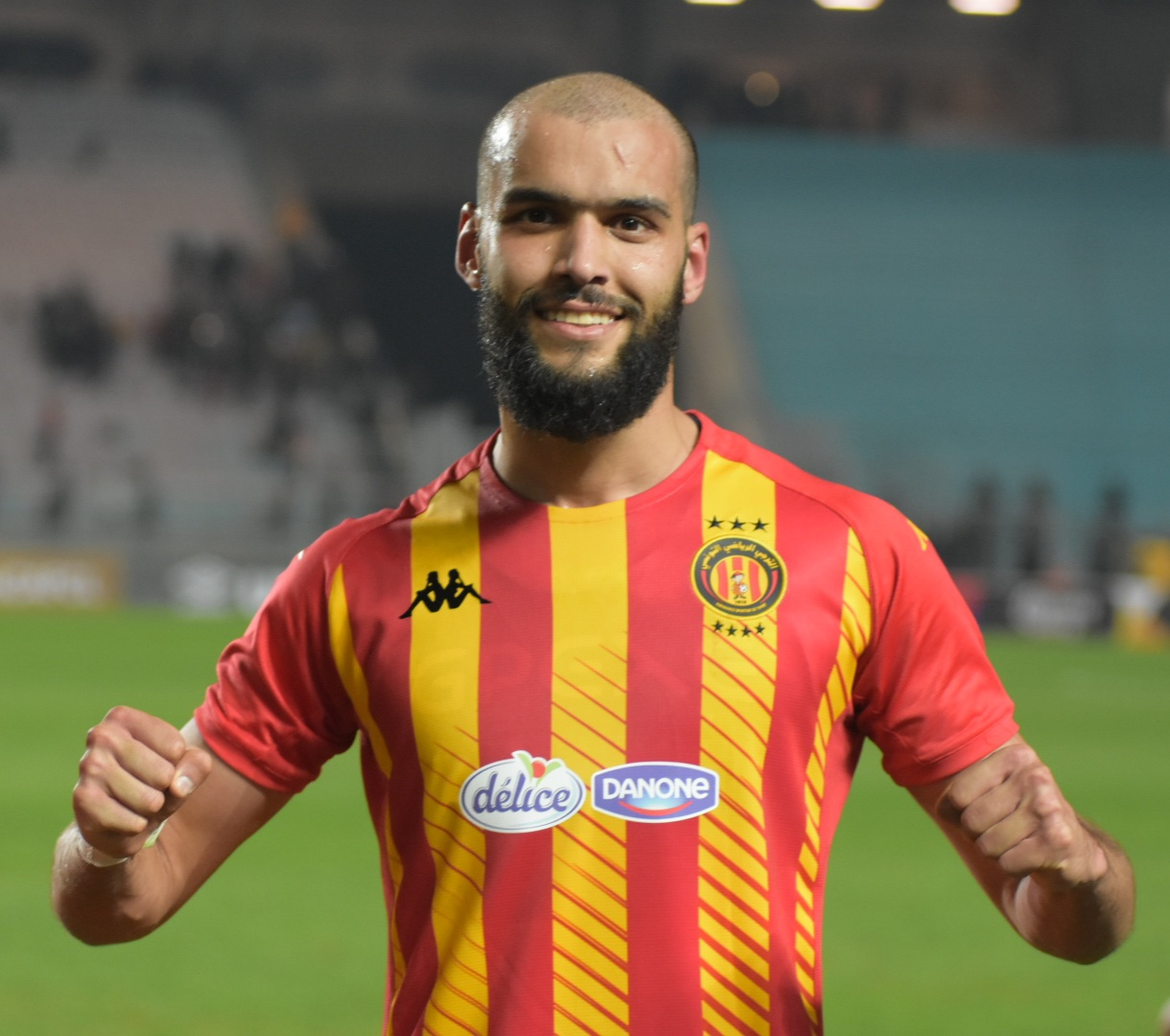
- Tougai in 2023

Personal information
- Full name: Mohamed Amine Tougai
- Date of birth: 22 January 2000 (age 26)
- Place of birth: Bourouba, Algeria
- Height: 1.91 m (6 ft 3 in)
- Position: Centre-back

Team information
- Current team: Al Ahli Tripoli
- Number: 21

Youth career
- NA Hussein Dey

Senior career*
Years	Team	Apps	(Gls)
2019–2020	NA Hussein Dey	18	(0)
2020–2026	Espérance de Tunis	100	(8)
2026–	Al Ahli Tripoli	0	(0)

International career^{‡}
2018	Algeria U18	3	(0)
2017–2018	Algeria U20	9	(0)
2019	Algeria U23	4	(0)
2021–	Algeria	30	(2)
Medal record
Men's football
Representing Algeria
FIFA Arab Cup
Winner	2021 Qatar
- * Club domestic league appearances and goals as of 01st August 2026 ‡ National team caps and goals as of 11 June 2026

Mohamed Amine Tougai (Arabic: محمد أمين توغاي; born 22 January 2000) is an Algerian professional footballer who plays as a centre-back for Libyan Premier League club Al Ahli Tripoli and the Algeria national team.

== Club career ==
In May 2018, Tougai signed his first professional contract with his boyhood club NA Hussein Dey, agreeing to a five-year deal at the age of 18.

He made his senior debut on 15 January 2019 in a 4–1 away defeat to USM Alger.

On 29 December 2019, Tougai joined Espérance de Tunis on a four-and-a-half-year contract. He made his debut for the club in a 2–0 away victory over CA Bizertin.

== International career ==
In January 2022, Tougai was selected in Algeria's squad for the 2021 Africa Cup of Nations, where the team was eliminated in the group stage.

On 29 December 2023, he was named in Djamel Belmadi's 27-man Algeria squad for the 2023 Africa Cup of Nations.

On 31 May 2026, Tougai was named in Vladimir Petković's 26-man Algeria squad for the 2026 FIFA World Cup.

== Career statistics ==
=== Club ===
As of 10 May 2025

Appearances and goals by club, season and competition
Club	Season	League			National cup		Continental		Other		Total	
Club	Season	Division	Apps	Goals	Apps	Goals	Apps	Goals	Apps	Goals	Apps	Goals
NA Hussein Dey	2018–19	Algerian Ligue Professionnelle 1	14	0	2	0	7 (Note: Appearances in CAF Confederation Cup)	1	—		23	1
NA Hussein Dey	2019–20	Algerian Ligue Professionnelle 1	4	0	—		—		—		4	0
NA Hussein Dey	Total		18	0	2	0	7	1	—		27	1
Espérance de Tunis	2019–20	Tunisian Ligue Professionnelle 1	5	0	3	0	0	0	0	0	8	0
Espérance de Tunis	2020–21	Tunisian Ligue Professionnelle 1	10	0	0	0	2 (Note: Appearances in CAF Champions League)	0	—		12	0
Espérance de Tunis	2021–22	Tunisian Ligue Professionnelle 1	20	3	0	0	10	0	0	0	30	3
Espérance de Tunis	2022–23	Tunisian Ligue Professionnelle 1	19	0	3	0	12	1	—		34	1
Espérance de Tunis	2023–24	Tunisian Ligue Professionnelle 1	15	0	—		18 (Note: Fourteen appearances and one goal in CAF Champions League, four appearances and one goal in African Football League)	2	3 (Note: All appearances in Arab Club Champions Cup)	0	36	2
Espérance de Tunis	2024–25	Tunisian Ligue Professionnelle 1	16	3	3	0	9	1	4 (Note: One appearance in Tunisian Super Cup, three appearances in FIFA Club World Cup)	0	32	4
Espérance de Tunis	2025–26	Tunisian Ligue Professionnelle 1	13	2	0	0	7	2	1 (Note: Appearance in Tunisian Super Cup)	0	21	4
Espérance de Tunis	Total		100	8	6	0	58	6	8	0	175	14
Al Ahli Tripoli	2026–27	Libyan Premier League	0	0	0	0	0	0	0	0	0	0
Career total			118	8	11	0	65	7	8	0	202	15

=== International ===
As of match played 11 June 2026

Appearances and goals by national team and year
National team	Year	Apps	Goals
Algeria	2021	4	1
Algeria	2022	3	0
Algeria	2023	6	0
Algeria	2024	9	0
Algeria	2025	6	1
Algeria	2026	2	0
Total		30	2

Scores and results list Algeria's goal tally first, score column indicates score after each Tougai goal.

List of international goals scored by Mohamed Amine Tougai
No.	Date	Venue	Opponent	Score	Result	Competition
1.	7 December 2021	Al Janoub Stadium, Al Wakrah, Qatar	Egypt	1–0	1–1	2021 FIFA Arab Cup
2.	9 December 2025	Khalifa International Stadium, Al Rayyan, Qatar	Iraq	1–0	2–0	2025 FIFA Arab Cup

== Honours ==
Espérance de Tunis

- Tunisian Ligue Professionnelle 1: 2019–20, 2020–21, 2021–22, 2023–24, 2024–25
- Tunisian Super Cup: 2021, 2024, 2025
- Tunisian Cup: 2024–25, 2025–26

Algeria

- FIFA Arab Cup: 2021
