= Achref Habbassi =

Tunisian footballer (born 2001)

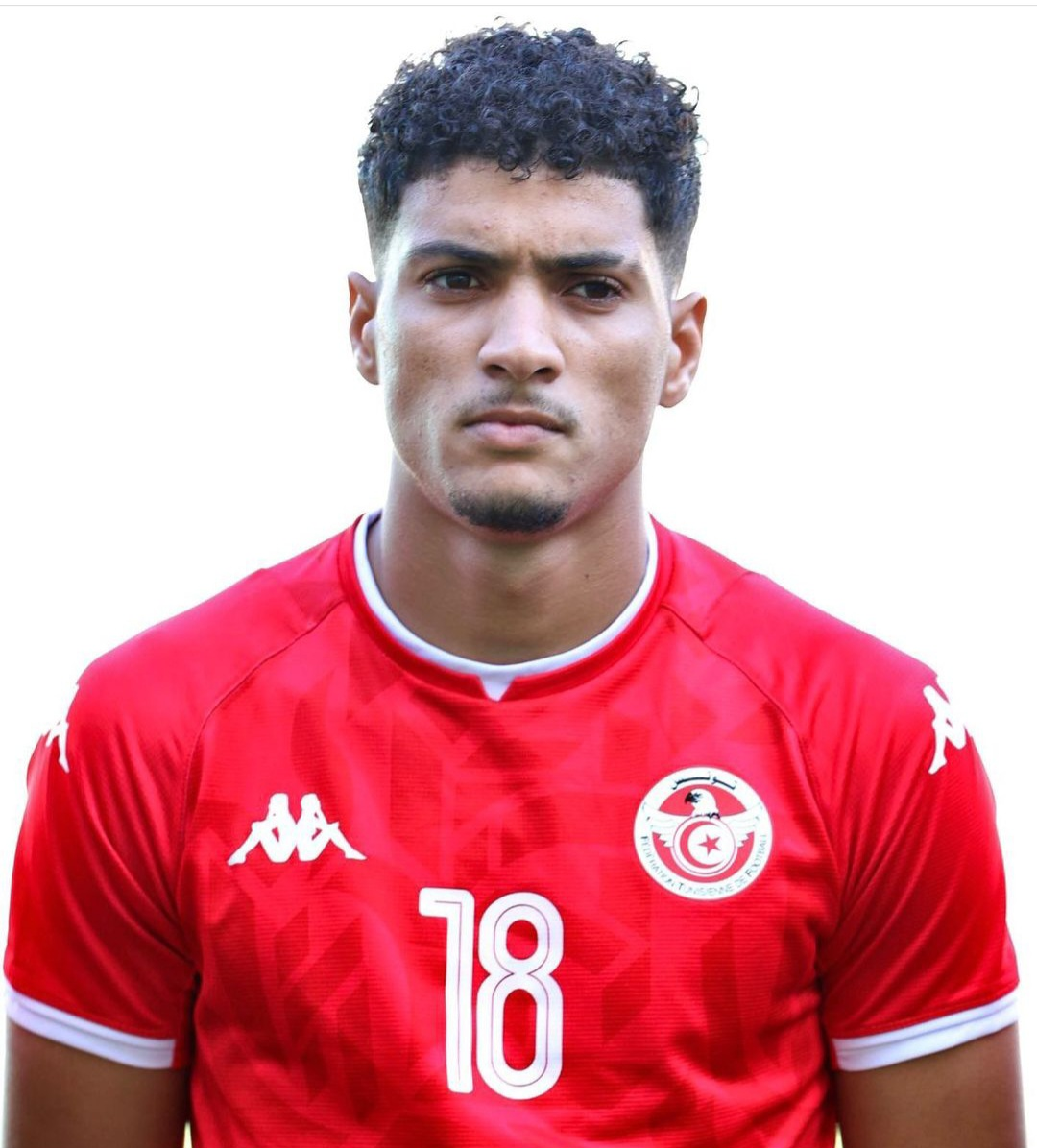
- Habessi in 2022.

Personal information
- Date of birth: 8 December 2001 (age 24)
- Place of birth: Siliana, Tunisia
- Height: 1.77 m (5 ft 10 in)
- Position: Right winger

Team information
- Current team: AS FAR

Youth career
- 2013–2019: CS Sfaxien

Senior career*
Years	Team	Apps	(Gls)
2019–2025	CS Sfaxien	91	(10)
2025–	AS FAR		

International career
2021–	Tunisia U23	4	(1)
- * Club domestic league appearances and goals as of 21 August 2025

Achref Habbassi (born 8 December 2001; Arabic: أشرف الحباسي) is a Tunisian professional footballer who plays as a right winger for AS FAR, he plays for the Tunisia national team -23.

== Career ==
He began with CS Sfaxien, where he passed all categories.

The CS Sfaxien club announced that Habbassi had signed a professional contract with the team until 2025.

== Honours ==
CS Sfaxien

- Tunisian Cup (2)
