= Zied Machmoum =

Tunisian association football player

Personal information
- Date of birth: 18 January 1993 (age 33)
- Height: 1.83 m (6 ft 0 in)
- Position: Defender

Senior career*
Years	Team	Apps	(Gls)
2011–2021	US Monastir	167	(10)
2021–2024	Espérance de Tunis	28	(1)
2024–2025	US Ben Guerdane	23	(1)
2025–2026	Al-Taraji		
- * Club domestic league appearances and goals as of 30 August 2024

Zied Machmoum (Arabic: زياد مشموم; born 28 January 1993) is a Tunisian professional footballer who plays as a defender.

On 29 September 2025, Machmoum joined Saudi Second Division League club Al-Taraji.
