= Wassim Karoui =

Tunisian footballer

Personal information
- Date of birth: 7 January 1997 (age 29)
- Place of birth: Tunis, Tunisia
- Height: 1.86 m (6 ft 1 in)
- Position: Goalkeeper

Youth career
- Espérance de Tunis

Senior career*
Years	Team	Apps	(Gls)
2015–2025	Espérance de Tunis	2	(0)
2018–2019	→ US Ben Guerdane (loan)	5	(0)
2023–2024	→ AS Soliman (loan)	18	(0)
- * Club domestic league appearances and goals as of 22 May 2024

Wassim Karoui (Arabic: وسيم القروي; born 7 January 1997) is a Tunisian professional footballer who plays as a goalkeeper.
