= Ilyes Chetti =

Algerian footballer (born 1995)

Personal information
- Full name: Ilyes Chetti
- Date of birth: 22 January 1995 (age 31)
- Place of birth: Annaba, Algeria
- Height: 1.79 m (5 ft 10 in)
- Position: Left-back

Team information
- Current team: USM Alger
- Number: 23

Youth career
- –2014: USM Annaba

Senior career*
Years	Team	Apps	(Gls)
2013–2014	USM Annaba		
2014–2017	US Chaouia		
2017–2019	JS Kabylie	43	(2)
2019–2022	ES Tunis	45	(1)
2022–2023	Angers	6	(0)
2023–2024	Wydad AC	13	(0)
2024–	USM Alger	39	(1)

International career^{‡}
2018–	Algeria A'	7	(0)
Medal record
Men's football
Representing Algeria
FIFA Arab Cup
Winner	2021 Qatar
- * Club domestic league appearances and goals as of 6 June 2026 ‡ National team caps and goals as of 17 December 2021

Ilyes Chetti (Arabic: إلياس شتي; born 22 January 1995) is an Algerian professional footballer who plays as a left-back for USM Alger.

== Club career ==
On 19 July 2022, Chetti signed for Ligue 1 club Angers on a four-year contract. The deal caused a legal dispute between ES Tunis and Angers, as Chetti had terminated his contract with the Tunisian club before joining Angers. On 27 April 2023, FIFA ruled in ES Tunis's favor, sentencing Chetti to pay €970,000 to his former club and handing Angers a two-window transfer ban. Chetti was also suspended from football for four months.

On 30 May 2023, Chetti was dismissed by Angers following his conviction on sexual assault charges on 6 April 2023. He had received a four-month suspended prison sentence.

On 8 July 2024, Chetti joined USM Alger.

== Career statistics ==
As of 30 May 2023

Appearances and goals by club, season and competition
Club	Season	League			Cup		Continental		Other		Total	
Club	Season	Division	Apps	Goals	Apps	Goals	Apps	Goals	Apps	Goals	Apps	Goals
JS Kabylie	2017–18	Algerian Ligue Professionnelle 1	14	0	3	0	—		—		17	0
JS Kabylie	2018–19	Algerian Ligue Professionnelle 1	29	2	1	0	—		—		30	2
JS Kabylie	Total		43	2	4	0	—		—		47	2
ES Tunis	2019–20	Tunisian Ligue Professionnelle 1	15	1	3	1	8 (Note: All appearance(s) in Champions League)	0	7 (Note: One appearance in Tunisian Super Cup, three appearances in Arab Club Champions Cup, one appearance in CAF Super Cup, two appearances in FIFA Club World Cup)	0	33	2
ES Tunis	2020–21	Tunisian Ligue Professionnelle 1	14	0	1	0	10	0	—		25	0
ES Tunis	2021–22	Tunisian Ligue Professionnelle 1	16	1	1	0	4	0	—		21	1
ES Tunis	Total		45	2	5	1	22	0	7	0	79	3
Angers	2022–23	Ligue 1	6	0	0	0	—		—		6	0
Career total			94	4	9	1	22	0	7	0	132	5

== Honours ==
ES Tunis

- Tunisian Ligue Professionnelle 1: 2019–20, 2020–21, 2021–22
- Tunisian Super Cup: 2020–21

USM Alger

- Algerian Cup: 2024–25, 2025–26
- CAF Confederation Cup: 2025–26
- CAF Super Cup: 2026

Algeria

- FIFA Arab Cup: 2021
