= Anayo Iwuala =

Nigerian footballer

Personal information
- Full name: Anayo Emmanuel Iwuala
- Date of birth: 20 March 1999 (age 27)
- Place of birth: Ughelli, Delta State, Nigeria
- Height: 1.65 m (5 ft 5 in)
- Position: Winger

Team information
- Current team: Al Arabi

Senior career*
Years	Team	Apps	(Gls)
2018–2019	Kada City	8	(2)
2019	Delta Force	9	(1)
2019–2021	Enyimba	38	(6)
2021–2023	Espérance de Tunis	19	(0)
2022–2023	→ CR Belouizdad (loan)	23	(4)
2023–	Al Arabi	0	(0)

International career^{‡}
2021–	Nigeria	5	(0)
- * Club domestic league appearances and goals as of 6 June 2023 ‡ National team caps and goals as of 4 July 2021

Anayo Emmanuel Iwuala (born 20 March 1999) is a Nigerian professional footballer who plays as a winger for Kuwait Premier League club Al Arabi and the Nigeria national team.

== Career ==
Iwuala signed to Espérance de Tunis at the beginning of the 2021–22 season. In September 2021, Espérance de Tunis played the Super Cup final in which Iwuala scored the only goal of the game helping the team to win the cup.

== International career ==
Iwuala debuted for the Nigeria national team in a 1–0 2021 Africa Cup of Nations qualification win over Benin on 27 March 2021.

== Honours ==
Espérance de Tunis

- Tunisian Super Cup: 2021
- Tunisian Ligue Professionnelle 1: 2021–22

CR Belouizdad

- Algerian Ligue Professionnelle 1: 2022–23
