= Nassim Ben Khalifa =

Swiss footballer (born 1992)

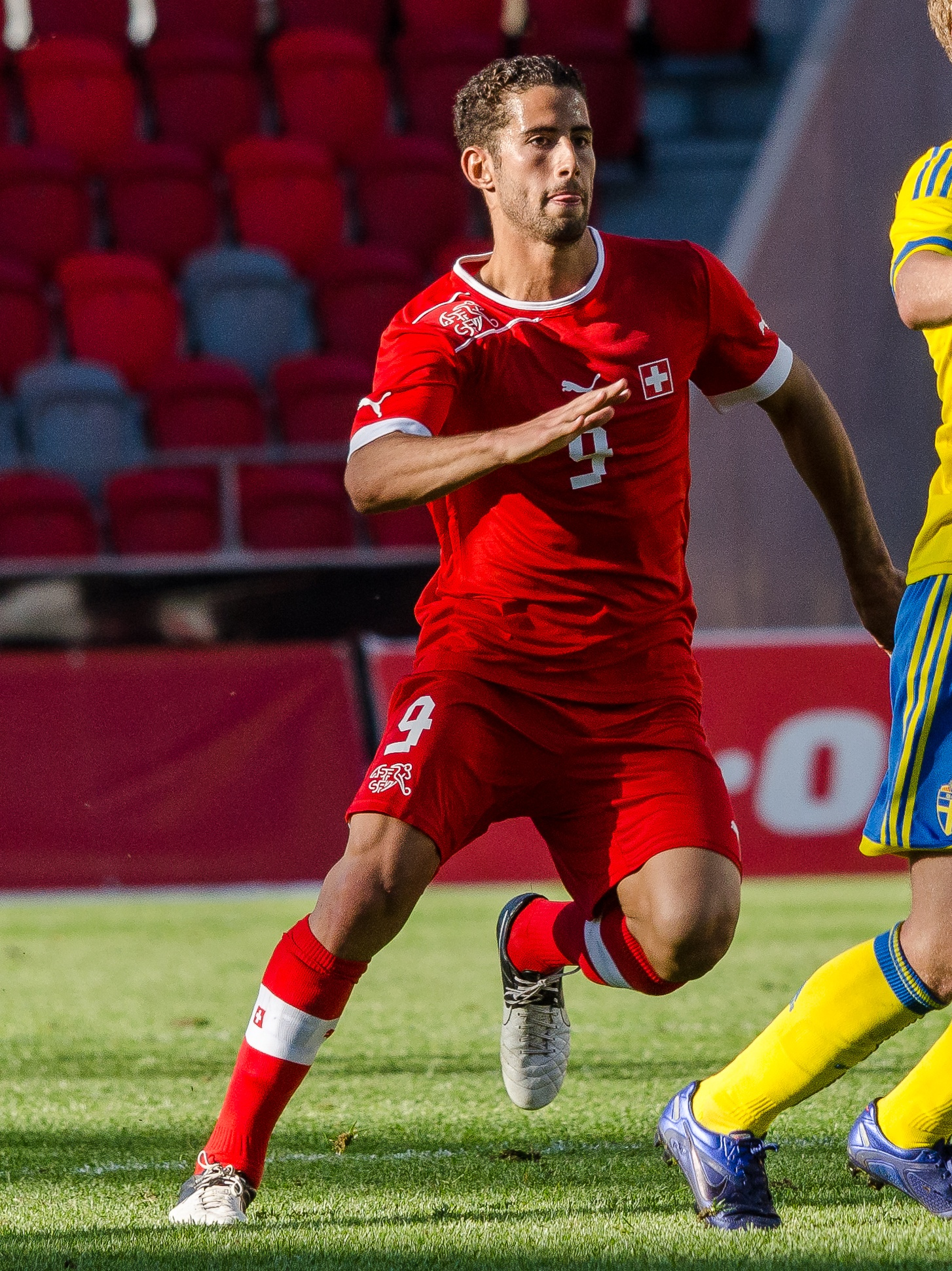
- Khalifa playing for Switzerland U21 in 2013

Personal information
- Date of birth: 13 January 1992 (age 34)
- Place of birth: Prangins, Switzerland
- Height: 1.80 m (5 ft 11 in)
- Position: Forward

Youth career
- 2001–2002: Nyon
- 2002–2005: Gland
- 2005–2008: Lausanne-Sport
- 2008–2010: Grasshoppers

Senior career*
Years	Team	Apps	(Gls)
2010–2014	VfL Wolfsburg	0	(0)
2010–2014	VfL Wolfsburg II	6	(2)
2011	→ 1. FC Nürnberg (loan)	1	(0)
2011	→ 1. FC Nürnberg II (loan)	9	(2)
2011–2012	→ Young Boys (loan)	17	(2)
2012–2014	→ Grasshoppers (loan)	57	(11)
2014–2015	Grasshoppers	23	(1)
2015–2016	Eskişehirspor	11	(0)
2016	→ KV Mechelen (loan)	7	(0)
2016–2017	Lausanne-Sport	23	(9)
2017–2019	St. Gallen	35	(5)
2019–2020	Grasshoppers	13	(6)
2020–2022	Espérance Sportive de Tunis	15	(1)
2022–2023	Sanfrecce Hiroshima	39	(7)
2024–2026	Avispa Fukuoka	19	(1)

International career^{‡}
2007	Switzerland U15/16	7	(3)
2007–2009	Switzerland U17	25	(10)
2009	Switzerland U18	11	(6)
2010–2013	Switzerland U21	24	(4)
2010–	Switzerland	4	(0)
- * Club domestic league appearances and goals as of 21:25, 6 August 2026 (UTC) ‡ National team caps and goals as of 14:29, 19 November 2013 (UTC)

Nassim Ben Khalifa (born 13 January 1992) is a Swiss professional footballer who plays as a forward, most recently for J1 League club Avispa Fukuoka.

== Club career ==
=== Grasshoppers ===
Ben Khalifa started playing football with local team Nyon, Gland and Lausanne-Sport before joining Grasshoppers after being recommended by Stéphane Chapuisat and this was the start of his professional career.

Ben Khalifa made his debut with Grasshoppers in the Swiss Super League on 7 March 2009, at the age of 17, where he played the last 11 minutes in the game against FC Sion. He scored his first Super League goal in his fourth game, on 19 July 2009, also against Sion. Until he left Grasshopper at the end of the 2009–10 season, Ben Khalifa played a total of 28 league matches and scored eight goals. The club would find themselves in the financial difficulties and would need to sell him. As a result of moving, the sale of Ben Khalifa helps the club solve their financial difficulties.

=== Wolfsburg ===
On 19 February 2010, he signed a four-year contract with VfL Wolfsburg of the German Bundesliga and joined his new club on 1 July 2010. He attracted interest from Premier League club Arsenal and Serie A side Inter Milan, but Wolfsburg managed to beat both clubs to sign him. However, he has never played for Wolfsburg in a Bundesliga game.

Ben Khalifa spent the first half of the 2010–11 season, playing in the club's reserve, where he made his debut, in a 4–2 win over Türkiyemspor Berlin on 20 August 2010. Ben Khalifa made six appearances scoring two goals against Magdeburg on 19 September 2010 and Oberneuland on 1 October 2010. He later stated about playing in Regionalliga, citing: "This is discussed with the trainer. I want to play with the reserve, than sitting in the Bundesliga in the stands."

After half a season on the bench, Wolfsburg loaned Ben Khalifa out to 1. FC Nürnberg until summer 2012, where he made his Bundesliga debut on 5 March 2011, being brought into the game against FC St. Pauli in the 82nd minute.

German Newspaper Westdeutsche Allgemeine Zeitung named Ben Khalifa, along with two other players, as the worst signing since the winter transfer 2010.

=== Young Boys (Loan Spell) ===
After the loan spell with Nürnberg, in July 2011, Ben Khalifa moved to BSC Young Boys on loan for the 2011–12 season The previously year, Ben Khalifa was linked with a loan move to Young Boys, but the club's general manager Dieter Hoeneß made it clear, quoting on Ben Khalifa: "This is not an issue at this time!"

He made his debut for the club, in the third round of Europa League, where he played in both legs, which in the second leg, he made a double assist to send the club through to the next round. In the Europa League play-offs in the second leg, Ben Khalifa was sent off in the 62nd minute after he was involved in an incident with Quim, as Young Boys drew 2–2 with Braga, but were eliminated due to away goal. While at Young Boys, Ben Khalifa made seventeen appearances and scoring against Neuchâtel Xamax on 21 September 2011 and Thun on 10 December 2011.

=== Grasshoppers ===
On 23 June 2012, Ben Khalifa signed a two-year loan deal with his first professional club Grasshoppers for the 2012–13 season. He made his debut since coming back two years ago, as Grasshoppers lost 2–0 to Sion, in the opening game of the season and on 28 July 2014, he scored his first goal for the club, in a 2–2 draw against Basel. He would later score six goals in thirty-three appearances and helped the club win the Swiss Cup after beating Basel on penalty-shootout, ending a ten-year drought.

In his second year to his loan spell at Grasshoppers, Ben Khalifa scored in the qualification round second leg of Europa League, in a 1–0 win over Fiorentina, but remained out due to Fiorentina's away goal. After scoring three goals in twenty appearances, Ben Khalifa scored twice, as Grasshoppers thrashed St. Gallen 5–1 on 17 February 2014. Towards the end of the 2013–14 season, Ben Khalifa tore his ACL during a 4–2 win over Sion and will be out for six months, as well as, missing the rest of the 2013–14 season and the start of the 2014–15 season. He would finish his second year to his loan spell at Grasshoppers, where he made twenty-four appearances and scored five times.

On 5 May 2014, Ben Khalifa joined Grasshoppers on a three-year contract.

=== Eskişehirspor ===
In January 2015, Grasshoppers manager Michael Skibbe ended his contract with Grasshoppers and went on to manage Turkish club Eskişehirspor, with Ben Khalifa following him there. After a brief loan spell at Belgian club KV Mechelen, Ben Khalifa resigned from Eskişehirspor in July 2016.

=== Lausanne-Sport ===
He then came back to Switzerland, and on 21 October 2016, he signed with Lausanne-Sport, where he had already played as a youth. He scored his first goal for them during his fourth appearance, a 1–2 loss against Young Boys.

=== Return to Grasshoppers ===
On 5 July 2019 it was confirmed by Grasshoppers, that Ben Khalifa had returned to the club on a one-year contract with an option for one further year.

=== Espérance de Tunis ===
Ben Khalifa joined Espérance de Tunis in his native country in the summer of 2020, but left the team by mutual consent on 24 March 2022.

=== Sanfrecce Hiroshima ===
Then, on 25 April 2022, he joined Sanfrecce Hiroshima to increase the attacking options of the japanese team, which was struggling with injuries at the time of his arrival. He was signed during Michael Skibbe tenure at the japanese club, being it the 3rd time that Nassim and Michael will be working together at the same team, as player and manager, respectively.Then, on 22 October 2022, they got the J League Cup title.

=== Avispa Fukuoka ===
On 12 January 2024, Ben Khalifa was announced at Avispa Fukuoka. His first and only goal for the club was scored in February 2025, in a 2–1 league defeat to Kawasaki Frontale. In June 2026, he left the club after his contract expired following the J1 100 Year Vision League, making 21 appearances in two and a half years.

== International career ==
Ben Khalifa has played for Swiss youth squads at various levels from U-15 to U-18. He has participated at the U-17 European Championships in 2008 in Turkey and in 2009 in Germany as well as at the Under-17 World Cup in 2009 in Nigeria, where he was awarded the "Silver Ball" trophy for the second best player of the tournament.

At the age of only 18, he made his debut for the Swiss U-21 squad on 26 May 2010 against Turkey.

For the 2010 FIFA World Cup in South Africa he was on Switzerland's reserve list (30 players), but did not make it into the final 23-man squad. His first appearance for the Swiss national team was on 11 August 2010 against Austria. He remains available to represent Tunisia, having never competed in any major tournament for Switzerland.

== Personal life ==
Ben Khalifa is of Tunisian origin. His native languages are Arabic and French, and he learned English and German at school.

== Honours ==
Grasshopper

- Swiss Cup: 2012–13

ES Tunis

- Tunisian League: 2020–21, 2021–22
- Tunisian Super Cup: 2020–21

Sanfrecce Hiroshima

- J.League Cup: 2022

Switzerland U-17

- FIFA U-17 World Cup: 2009

Individual

- U17 Silver Ball: 2009
