= William Togui =

Ivorian footballer

Personal information
- Full name: William Mel Togui
- Date of birth: 7 August 1996 (age 30)
- Place of birth: Lakota, Ivory Coast
- Height: 1.81 m (5 ft 11 in)
- Position: Forward

Senior career*
Years	Team	Apps	(Gls)
2013–2014	Espoir Koumassi		
2014–2015	Difaâ El Jadida	9	(2)
2015–2016	Ittihad Khemisset		
2017	Rapide Oued Zem		
2017–2018	SC Gagnoa	26	(23)
2018–2023	Mechelen	60	(14)
2021	→ Espérance de Tunis (loan)	9	(3)
2021–2022	→ RWDM (loan)	24	(5)
2022–2023	→ Hapoel Jerusalem (loan)	30	(3)
2023–2024	Tuzlaspor	28	(8)
2024–2025	Ankara Keçiörengücü	9	(0)

International career^{‡}
2018	Ivory Coast	5	(0)
- * Club domestic league appearances and goals as of 2 January 2025 ‡ National team caps and goals as of 14:26, 10 September 2020 (UTC)

William Mel Togui (born 7 August 1996) is an Ivorian professional footballer who plays as a forward.

== Club career ==
On 31 August 2021, he joined RWDM in the Belgian First Division B on loan for the 2021–22 season.

On 18 July 2022, Togui moved on a new loan to Hapoel Jerusalem in Israel.

== Career statistics ==
=== Club ===
As of 1 June 2022

Appearances and goals by club, season and competition
Club	Season	League			Cup		Continental		Other		Total	
Club	Season	Division	Apps	Goals	Apps	Goals	Apps	Goals	Apps	Goals	Apps	Goals
Difaâ El Jadida	2014–15	Botola	9	2	0	0	–		0	0	9	2
SC Gagnoa	2017–18	Ligue 1	26	23	0	0	–		0	0	26	23
KV Mechelen	2018–19	Belgian First Division B	20	4	4 (Note: Appearances in the Belgian Cup)	0	–		0	0	24	4
KV Mechelen	2019–20	Belgian First Division A	26	9	0	0	–		1	0	27	9
KV Mechelen	2020–21	Belgian First Division A	14	1	0	0	–		0	0	14	1
Espérance Sportive de Tunis	2021–22	Tunisian Ligue Professionnelle 1	9	3	0	0	9	1	0	0	18	4
RWDM47	2021–22	Belgian First Division B	24	5	2	0	–		2	0	28	5
Hapoel Jerusalem	2022–23	Israeli Premier League	0	0	0 (Note: Appearances in the Israeli State Cup)	0	–		0	0	0	0
Career total			128	47	0	0	9	1	3	0	146	48

=== International ===
As of matches played 24 September 2018

Appearances and goals by national team and year
National team	Year	Apps	Goals
Ivory Coast	2018	3	0
Total		3	0

== Honours ==
Mechelen

- Belgian Cup: 2018–19
