= Kingsley Eduwo =

Nigerian international footballer (born 1996)

Personal information
- Date of birth: 19 June 1996 (age 30)
- Place of birth: Lagos, Nigeria
- Height: 1.80 m (5 ft 11 in)
- Position: Striker

Team information
- Current team: Al Masry SC
- Number: 20

Senior career*
Years	Team	Apps	(Gls)
2012	Gateway United		
2013–2014	Sunshine Stars		
2015–2017	Lobi Stars		
2017–2021	CS Sfaxien	48	(10)
2018–2019	→ Al-Najaf (loan)		
2021–2022	Al Urooba	13	(2)
2022	Espérance de Tunis	12	(0)
2022–2023	Al-Arabi	0	(0)
2023–2025	Club Africain	18	(6)
2025	ES Sétif	13	(3)
2025–	Al Masry SC	4	(1)

International career^{‡}
2017–	Nigeria	2	(1)
- * Club domestic league appearances and goals as of 16 November 2025 ‡ National team caps and goals as of 19 August 2017

Kingsley Eduwo (born 19 June 1996) is a Nigerian international footballer who plays for Al Masry SC as a striker.

== Career ==
Born in Lagos, Eduwo has played club football for Gateway United, Sunshine Stars, Lobi Stars, CS Sfaxien, Al-Najaf and Al Urooba.

He made his international debut for Nigeria in 2017.

=== International goals ===
Scores and results list Nigeria's goal tally first.

No.	Date	Venue	Opponent	Score	Result	Competition
1.	19 August 2017	Sani Abacha Stadium, Kano, Nigeria	Benin	2–0	2–0	2018 African Nations Championship qualification
