= Zied Berrima =

Tunisian footballer

Personal information
- Date of birth: 4 September 2001 (age 25)
- Height: 1.81 m (5 ft 11 in)
- Position: Forward

Team information
- Current team: CA Bizertin

Youth career
- AS Ariana
- 2018–2019: Espérance de Tunis

Senior career*
Years	Team	Apps	(Gls)
2019–2024	Espérance de Tunis	24	(3)
2024–	Stade Tunisien	0	(0)

International career
2018	Tunisia U17	1	(0)
2020–2021	Tunisia U20	13	(2)
- * Club domestic league appearances and goals as of 27 August 2023

Zied Berrima (born 4 September 2001) is a Tunisian professional footballer who plays as a forward for Tunisian Ligue Professionnelle 1 club Stade Tunisien.

== Career ==
Berrima grew up in the academy Espérance de Tunis where he was considered to be one of their most talented young players. He signed his first professional contract on 1 August 2018.

Having trained with the first squad since 2018, he made his professional debuts on 15 January 2019 against the US Ben Guerdane in Ligue I.

== Honours ==
Espérance de Tunis

- Tunisian Super Cup: 2018, 2019, 2021
- Tunisian Ligue Professionnelle 1: 2018–19, 2019–20, 2020–21, 2021–22, 2023–24
- CAF Champions League: 2018–19
