= Raed Fedaa =

Tunisian footballer (born 1997)

Personal information
- Full name: Raed Fedaa
- Date of birth: 20 May 1997 (age 29)
- Place of birth: Tunisia
- Height: 1.68 m (5 ft 6 in)
- Position: Defender

Youth career
- Espérance de Tunis

Senior career*
Years	Team	Apps	(Gls)
2017–2025	Espérance de Tunis	53	(4)
2017–2018	→ Espérance de Zarzis (loan)	10	(0)
- * Club domestic league appearances and goals as of 30 June 2023

Raed Fedaa (Arabic:رائد الفادع; born 20 May 1997) is a Tunisian professional footballer who plays as a defender.
