= Afif Jebali =

Tunisian footballer

Personal information
- Date of birth: 10 January 2000 (age 26)
- Place of birth: Tunisia
- Height: 1.90 m (6 ft 3 in)
- Position: Centre-back

Team information
- Current team: Al-Mina'a
- Number: 45

Senior career*
| Years | Team | Apps | (Gls) |
| 2017–2021 | ES Tunis | 5 | (0) |
| 2020 | → CS Hammam-Lif (loan) | 9 | (0) |
| 2020–2021 | → ES Métlaoui (loan) | 0 | (0) |
| 2021– | Al-Mina'a | 0 | (0) |

International career
| 2017–2018 | Tunisia U17 | | |
| 2020– | Tunisia U23 | | |
- * Club domestic league appearances and goals

Afif Jebali (born 10 January 2000) is a Tunisian football defender who currently plays for Al-Mina'a which competes in the Iraqi Premier League.

== Honours ==
ES Tunis

- Tunisian Ligue I: 2019
- CAF Champions League: 2019
