= Alaeddine Marzouki =

Tunisian footballer

Personal information
- Date of birth: 3 July 1990 (age 36)
- Height: 1.84 m (6 ft 0 in)
- Position: Forward

Team information
- Current team: Al-Rawdah

Senior career*
Years	Team	Apps	(Gls)
2011–2012	Club Africain	12	(1)
2013	ES Hammam-Sousse	7	(0)
2013–2016	Stade Tunisien	69	(13)
2016–2020	CS Sfaxien	71	(24)
2020–2022	Espérance de Tunis	36	(4)
2022–2023	Al-Ain	9	(2)
2023	Al-Bukiryah	11	(4)
2023–2024	Al-Shoulla	28	(14)
2024–2025	Hajer		
2026–	Al-Rawdah		

International career
2019–	Tunisia	1	(0)
- * Club domestic league appearances and goals as of 30 August 2022

Alaeddine Marzouki (Arabic: عَلَاء الدِّين الْمَرْزُوقِيّ; born 3 July 1990) is a Tunisian football winger who plays for Saudi Arabian club Al-Rawdah.
