= Ghailene Chaalali =

Tunisian footballer

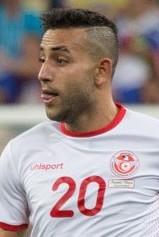
- Chaalali playing for Tunisia at the 2018 FIFA World Cup

Personal information
- Full name: Ghailene Chaalali
- Date of birth: 28 February 1994 (age 32)
- Place of birth: Manouba, Tunisia
- Height: 1.79 m (5 ft 10 in)
- Position: Midfielder

Youth career
- Espérance de Tunis

Senior career*
Years	Team	Apps	(Gls)
2014–2019	Espérance de Tunis	89	(4)
2019–2020	Yeni Malatyaspor	11	(0)
2020–2024	Espérance de Tunis	44	(1)
2024–2026	Al Ahli Tripoli	21	(2)

International career^{‡}
2017–2024	Tunisia	32	(1)
Medal record
Representing Tunisia
Men's football
FIFA Arab Cup
Runner-up	2021 Qatar
- * Club domestic league appearances and goals as of 22 March 2026 ‡ National team caps and goals as of 10 December 2022

Ghailene Chaalali (Arabic: غَيْلَان الشَّعْلَالِيّ; born 28 February 1994) is a Tunisian professional footballer who plays as a midfielder for the Tunisia national team.

== Club career ==
Chaalali participated in 2015 CAF Champions League with the club team Espérance de Tunis. During this competition, he scored a goal against Cosmos de Bafia of Cameroon.

== International career ==
In 2017, Chaalali was summoned to a training course of the Tunisian team before a match against Egypt counting for the qualification at the 2019 Africa Cup of Nations in Cameroon.

In June 2018 he was named in Tunisia's 23-man squad for the 2018 World Cup in Russia.

== Career statistics ==
As of 25 July 2019

Appearances and goals by national team and year
National team	Year	Apps	Goals
Tunisia	2017	5	1
Tunisia	2018	4	0
Tunisia	2019	8	0
Total		17	1

Scores and results list Tunisia's goal tally first, score column indicates score after each Chaalali goal.

List of international goals scored by Ghailene Chaalali
No.	Date	Venue	Opponent	Score	Result	Competition
1	1 September 2017	Stade Olympique de Radès, Tunis, Tunisia	DR Congo	2–1	2–1	2018 FIFA World Cup qualification

== Honours ==
Espérance de Tunis

- Tunisian Cup: 2015–16
- Tunisian Ligue Professionnelle 1: 2016–17, 2017–18, 2018–19, 2020–21, 2021–22, 2023–24
- Arab Club Champions Cup: 2017
- CAF Champions League: 2018, 2018–19
- Tunisian Super Cup: 2018, 2021
