= Rached Arfaoui =

Tunisian footballer

Personal information
- Date of birth: 7 March 1996 (age 30)
- Height: 1.74 m (5 ft 9 in)
- Position: Winger

Team information
- Current team: Ghazl El Mahalla SC
- Number: 9

Youth career
- Club Africain

Senior career*
Years	Team	Apps	(Gls)
2013–2016	Club Africain	1	(0)
2016–2018	Olympique Béja	3	(0)
2018–2021	Avenir de Soliman	51	(13)
2021–2023	Espérance de Tunis	19	(1)
2023–2025	Club Africain	25	(0)
2025-	Ghazl El Mahalla SC	33	(1)

International career
2013	Tunisia U17	4	(0)
2014	Tunisia U20	1	(0)
- * Club domestic league appearances and goals as of 13 May 2026

Rached Arfaoui (Arabic: رشاد العرفاوي) (born 7 March 1996) is a Tunisian winger at Ghazl El Mahalla SC. He was a squad member for the 2013 FIFA U-17 World Cup.
