= Montassar Triki =

Tunisian association football player

Personal information
- Date of birth: 29 August 2001 (age 25)
- Place of birth: Tunis, Tunisia
- Height: 1.83 m (6 ft 0 in)
- Position: Midfielder

Senior career*
Years	Team	Apps	(Gls)
2021–2025	Espérance de Tunis	16	(0)
2022–2023	→ AS Soliman (loan)	20	(1)
2024–2025	→ AS Soliman (loan)	26	(1)
2025–2026	Dobrudzha Dobrich	18	(1)
- * Club domestic league appearances and goals as of 26 July 2026

Montassar Triki (Arabic: مُنتَصَّر التريكي; born 29 August 2001) is a Tunisian professional footballer who plays as a midfielder .
