= Bilel Chabbar =

Tunisian footballer (born 2000)

Personal information
- Date of birth: 31 March 2000 (age 26)
- Place of birth: Tunis, Tunisia
- Height: 1.85 m (6 ft 1 in)
- Position: Defender

Team information
- Current team: Al Dhahra
- Number: 15

Youth career
- Espérance de Tunis

Senior career*
Years	Team	Apps	(Gls)
2020–2023	Espérance de Tunis	3	(0)
2023	→ Olympique Sidi Bouzid (loan)	11	(3)
2023–	Al Dhahra	0	(0)
- * Club domestic league appearances and goals as of 30 June 2023

Bilel Chabbar (Arabic:بلال شبار; born 31 March 2000) is a Tunisian professional footballer who plays as a defender for Libyan club Al Dhahra.
