= Farouk Mimouni =

Tunisian footballer

Personal information
- Date of birth: 23 June 2001 (age 25)
- Place of birth: Tunisia
- Height: 1.69 m (5 ft 7 in)
- Position: Left winger

Team information
- Current team: Espérance de Tunis
- Number: 33

Youth career
- EA Mateur
- Espérance de Tunis

Senior career*
Years	Team	Apps	(Gls)
2020–	Espérance de Tunis	31	(6)

International career
	Tunisia U20	5	(3)
- * Club domestic league appearances and goals as of 5 December 2023

Farouk Mimouni (Arabic: فَارُوق الْمَيْمُونِيّ; born 13 June 2001) is a Tunisian professional footballer who plays as a left winger for Tunisian Ligue Professionnelle 1 club Espérance de Tunis.
