= Abdelkader Bedrane =

Algerian footballer (born 1992)

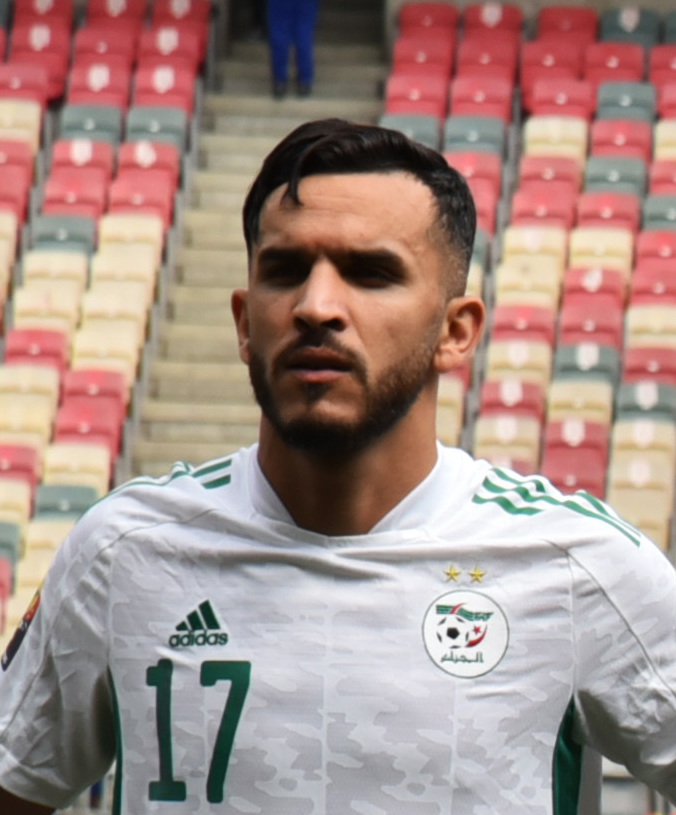
- Bedrane with Algeria in 2022

Personal information
- Full name: Abdelkader Bedrane
- Date of birth: 2 April 1992 (age 34)
- Place of birth: Blida, Algeria
- Height: 1.85 m (6 ft 1 in)
- Position: Center back

Youth career
- 2005–2013: USM Blida

Senior career*
Years	Team	Apps	(Gls)
2013–2016	USM Blida	92	(7)
2016–2019	ES Sétif	66	(4)
2019–2022	Espérance de Tunis	44	(3)
2022–2026	Damac	106	(5)

International career^{‡}
2016-	Algeria A'	5	(0)
2017–2025	Algeria	24	(0)
Medal record
Men's football
Representing Algeria
FIFA Arab Cup
Winner	2021 Qatar
- * Club domestic league appearances and goals as of 15 May 2026 ‡ National team caps and goals as of 12 December 2025

Abdelkader Bedrane (Arabic: عبد القادر بدران; born 2 April 1992) is an Algerian professional footballer who plays as a defender. He has also appeared for Algeria A' team.

== Career statistics ==
=== Club ===
As of match played 26 May 2025

Club	Season	League			Cup (Note: Includes the Algerian Cup)		Continental		Other		Total	
Club	Season	Division	Apps	Goals	Apps	Goals	Apps	Goals	Apps	Goals	Apps	Goals
USM Blida	2012–13	Algerian Ligue Professionnelle 2	9	0	0	0	—		—		9	0
USM Blida	2013–14	Algerian Ligue Professionnelle 2	27	2	2	0	—		—		29	2
USM Blida	2014–15	Algerian Ligue Professionnelle 2	28	2	3	1	—		—		31	3
USM Blida	2015–16	Algerian Ligue Professionnelle 1	29	3	2	0	—		—		31	3
USM Blida	Total		93	7	7	1	—		—		100	8
ES Sétif	2016–17	Algerian Ligue Professionnelle 1	26	2	5	2	—		—		31	4
ES Sétif	2017–18	Algerian Ligue Professionnelle 1	20	1	2	0	11	1	1	0	34	2
ES Sétif	2018–19	Algerian Ligue Professionnelle 1	20	1	5	2	—		—		25	3
ES Sétif	Total		66	4	12	4	11	1	1	0	90	9
ES Tunis	2019–20	Tunisian Ligue Professionnelle 1	15	1	4	0	8	0	7	1	34	2
ES Tunis	2020–21	Tunisian Ligue Professionnelle 1	16	2	1	0	12	0	1	0	30	2
ES Tunis	2021–22	Tunisian Ligue Professionnelle 1	13	0	0	0	7	1	1	0	21	1
ES Tunis	Total		44	3	5	0	27	1	9	1	85	5
Damac	2022–23	Saudi Pro League	20	1	0	0	—		—		20	1
Damac	2023–24	Saudi Pro League	27	1	0	0	—		—		27	1
Damac	2024–25	Saudi Pro League	31	0	1	0	—		—		32	0
Damac	Total		78	2	1	0	—		—		79	2
Career total			281	16	25	5	38	2	10	1	354	24

=== International ===
As of match played 23 September 2022

Appearances and goals by national team and year
National team	Year	Apps	Goals
Algeria	2017	2	0
Algeria	2018	1	0
Algeria	2021	11	0
Algeria	2022	9	0
Total		23	0

== Honours ==
ES Setif

- Algerian Ligue Professionnelle 1: 2016–17
- Algerian Super Cup: 2017

Espérance de Tunis

- Tunisian Ligue Professionnelle 1: 2019–20, 2020–21, 2021–22
- Tunisian Super Cup: 2020, 2020–21

Algeria

- FIFA Arab Cup: 2021
