= Farouk Ben Mustapha =

Tunisian footballer

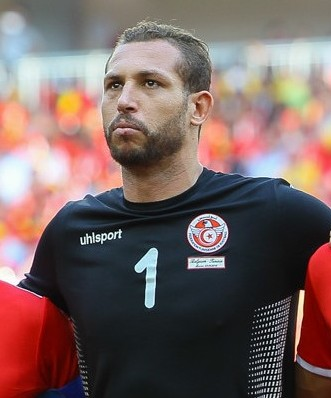
- Mustapha with Tunisia at the 2018 FIFA World Cup

Personal information
- Full name: Farouk Ben Mustapha
- Date of birth: 1 July 1989 (age 37)
- Place of birth: Bizerte, Tunisia
- Height: 1.92 m (6 ft 4 in)
- Position: Goalkeeper

Senior career*
| Years | Team | Apps | (Gls) |
| 2009–2014 | CA Bizertin | 106 | (0) |
| 2014–2017 | Club Africain | 62 | (0) |
| 2017–2020 | Al Shabab | 78 | (0) |
| 2020–2022 | Espérance de Tunis | 13 | (0) |

International career^{‡}
| 2010–2022 | Tunisia | 34 | (0) |
Medal record
Representing Tunisia
Men's football
FIFA Arab Cup
| Runner-up | 2021 Qatar |
- * Club domestic league appearances and goals as of 6 April 2022 ‡ National team caps and goals as of 24 January 2022

Farouk Ben Mustapha (Arabic: فَارُوق بَن مُصطَفى; born 1 July 1989) is a Tunisian former professional footballer who played as a goalkeeper.

== Career ==
Ben Mustapha was voted Ligue Professionnelle 1 player of the month for August 2009 by a fansite.

He was called up to play for Tunisia for the 2010 Africa Cup of Nations but did not play a match in the tournament.

In June 2018 he was named in Tunisia's 23-man squad for the 2018 FIFA World Cup in Russia. He was the substitute goalkeeper in the first Tunisia World Cup game versus England on 18 June 2018.

== Career statistics ==
=== International ===
As of 17 July 2019

Tunisia
| Year | Apps | Goals |
| 2012 | 2 | 0 |
| 2013 | 3 | 0 |
| 2014 | 5 | 0 |
| 2015 | 2 | 0 |
| 2016 | 0 | 0 |
| 2017 | 1 | 0 |
| 2018 | 8 | 0 |
| 2019 | 5 | 0 |
| Total | 26 | 0 |

== Honours ==
CA Bizertin

- Tunisian Cup: 2012–13

Club Africain

- Tunisian Ligue Professionnelle 1: 2014–15
- Tunisian Cup: 2016–17

Tunisia

- African Nations Championship: 2011
- FIFA Arab Cup runner-up: 2021
- Africa Cup of Nations fourth place: 2019

Individual

- Saudi Professional League Goalkeeper of the Month: January 2020
- Saudi Pro League Goalkeeper of the Season: 2018–19
