= Khalil Chemmam =

Tunisian footballer

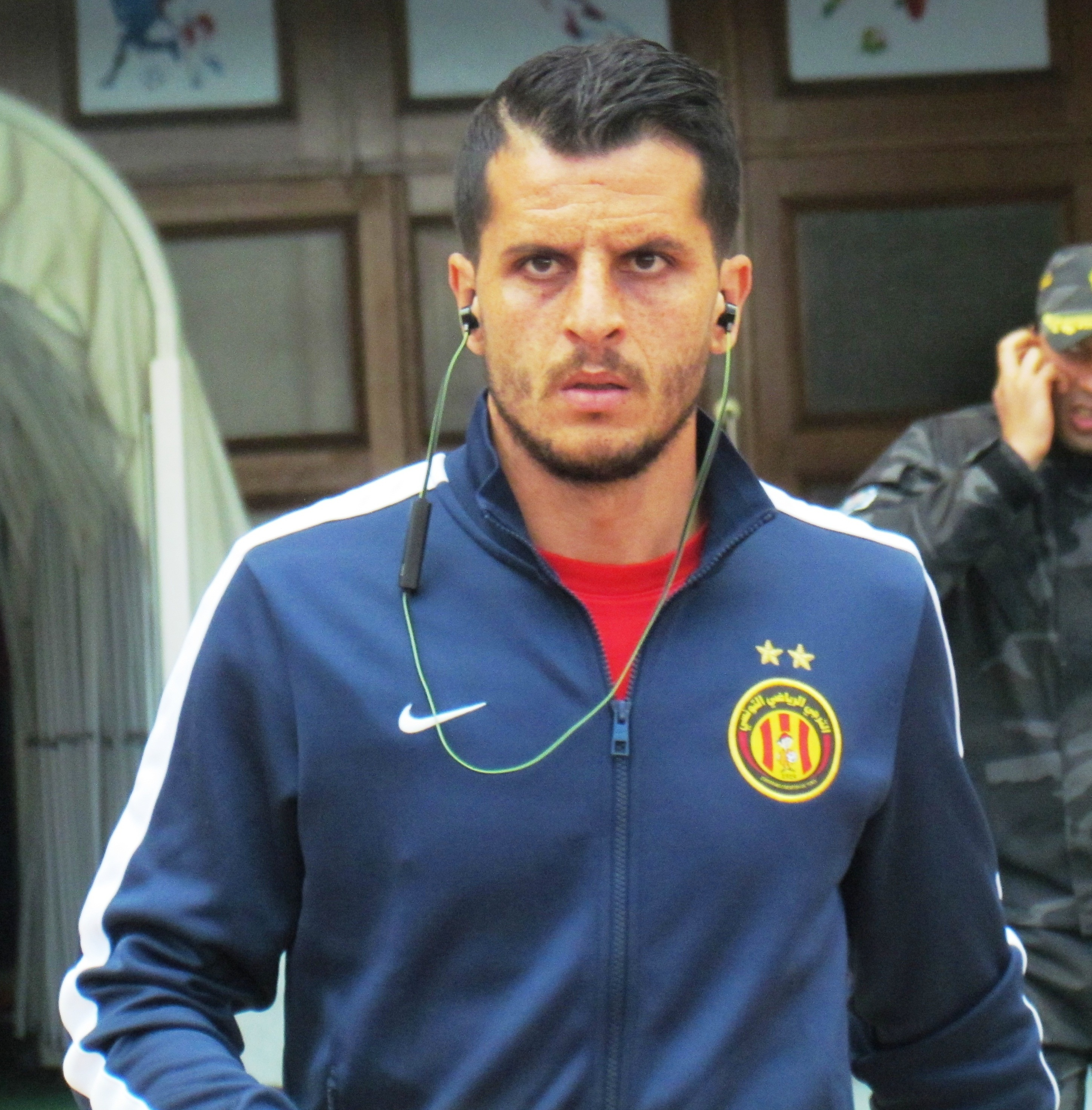
- Chemmam with Espérance de Tunis in 2017

Personal information
- Full name: Kalil Chemmam
- Date of birth: 24 July 1987 (age 39)
- Place of birth: Tunis, Tunisia
- Height: 1.80 m (5 ft 11 in)
- Position: Left back

Senior career*
Years	Team	Apps	(Gls)
2007–2014	Espérance de Tunis	133	(12)
2014–2015	Vitória de Guimarães B	7	(1)
2014–2015	Vitória de Guimarães	4	(0)
2015–2022	Espérance de Tunis	94	(2)

International career
2008–2013	Tunisia	26	(0)
- * Club domestic league appearances and goals

Khalil Chemmam (Arabic: خليل شمام; born 24 July 1987) is a Tunisian retired professional footballer who played as a left back and centre back for Espérance de Tunis and Vitória de Guimarães.

== Club career ==
Born in Tunis, Chemmam has played club football for Espérance Tunis, Vitória de Guimarães B and Vitória de Guimarães. He participated at the FIFA Club World Cup in 2011, 2018 and 2019.

== International career ==
Chemmam earned 26 caps for the Tunisia national team between 2008 and 2013. In May 2018 he was named in Tunisia's preliminary 29-man squad for the 2018 World Cup in Russia.
