= Cedrik Gbo =

Ivorian association football player

Personal information
- Full name: Jean Cedrik Gbo
- Date of birth: 9 September 2002 (age 24)
- Place of birth: Abidjan, Côte d'Ivoire
- Height: 1.82 m (6 ft 0 in)
- Position: Midfielder

Team information
- Current team: Étoile Sportive du Sahel
- Number: 6

Youth career
- Académie Chyko Kaïros
- 2019–2020: Espérance de Tunis

Senior career*
Years	Team	Apps	(Gls)
2020–2024	Espérance de Tunis	10	(0)
2022	→ OH Leuven (loan)	0	(0)
2023	→ Minnesota United 2 (loan)	19	(0)
2024-	Étoile Sportive du Sahel	40	(0)
- * Club domestic league appearances and goals as of 28 June 2026

Ètoile Sportive Du Sahel

Cedrik Gbo (born 9 September 2002) is an Ivorian footballer who currently plays as a midfielder for Tunisian Ligue Professionnelle 1 club Ètoile sportive du sahel.

== Career statistics ==
=== Club ===
As of 14 July 2021.

Club	Season	League			Cup		Continental		Other		Total	
Club	Season	Division	Apps	Goals	Apps	Goals	Apps	Goals	Apps	Goals	Apps	Goals
ES Tunis	2020–21	CLP-1	10	0	0	0	1 (Note: Appearances in the CAF Champions League)	0	0	0	11	0
Career total			10	0	0	0	1	0	0	0	11	0
