= Fedi Ben Choug =

French footballer (born 1995)

Personal information
- Full name: Fedi Ben Choug
- Date of birth: 12 March 1995 (age 31)
- Place of birth: Paris, France
- Height: 1.89 m (6 ft 2 in)
- Position: Midfielder

Youth career
- 2010–2014: Paris FC

Senior career*
Years	Team	Apps	(Gls)
2014–2015	Paris FC B	1	(0)
2015	Aubervilliers	2	(0)
2015–2016	CS Sfaxien	0	(0)
2015	→ Stade Tunisien (loan)	11	(0)
2016–2019	CA Bizertin	46	(1)
2019–2022	Espérance de Tunis	31	(5)
2022–2024	Hassania Agadir	35	(5)
2024	FC Turan	10	(0)
2024–2026	ES Sahel	48	(2)
- * Club domestic league appearances and goals as of 25 August 2026 @ 00:50(AEST)

Fedi Ben Choug (Arabic: فَادِي بْن شَوْق; born 12 March 1995) is a French professional footballer who plays as a midfielder.

== Career ==
On 30 July 2015, Ben Choug signed for Tunisian club CS Sfaxien on a four-year contract. On 28 June 2019, he moved to ES Tunis on a free transfer for three seasons, after his contract with CA Bizertin had expired.

== Career statistics ==
As of match played 1 June 2019

Appearances and goals by club, season and competition
Club	Season	League			Cup		Continental		Other		Total	
Club	Season	Division	Apps	Goals	Apps	Goals	Apps	Goals	Apps	Goals	Apps	Goals
Paris FC B	2014–15	Championnat de France Amateur 2	1	0	0	0	–		0	0	1	0
Aubervilliers	2014–15	Championnat de France Amateur	2	0	0	0	–		0	0	2	0
CS Sfaxien	2015–16	Tunisian Ligue Professionnelle 1	0	0	0	0	0	0	0	0	0	0
Stade Tunisien (loan)	2015–16	Tunisian Ligue Professionnelle 1	11	0	0	0	0	0	0	0	11	0
CA Bizertin	2016–17	Tunisian Ligue Professionnelle 1	10	1	1 (Note: Appearances in the Tunisian Cup)	1	0	0	0	0	11	2
CA Bizertin	2017–18	Tunisian Ligue Professionnelle 1	17	0	0	0	0	0	0	0	17	0
CA Bizertin	2018–19	Tunisian Ligue Professionnelle 1	19	0	0	0	0	0	0	0	19	0
CA Bizertin	Total		46	1	1	1	0	0	0	0	47	2
Career total			60	1	1	1	0	0	0	0	61	1
