= 2020–21 Étoile Sportive du Sahel season =

Étoile Sportive du Sahel
2020–21 season
- President: Ridha Charfeddine
- Head coach: Jorvan Vieira (from 29 November 2020) (until 11 January 2021); Lassaad Dridi (from 14 January 2021)
- Stadium: Stade Olympique de Sousse
- Ligue 1: Runners–up
- Tunisian Cup: Round of 16
- Confederation Cup: Group stage
- Top goalscorer: League: Aymen Sfaxi (9 goals); All: Souleymane Coulibaly (13 goals)
- Highest home attendance: 0 (Note: no one can attend games due to the COVID-19 pandemic)
- Lowest home attendance: 0 (Note: no one can attend games due to the COVID-19 pandemic)
- Average home league attendance: 0 (Note: no one can attend games due to the COVID-19 pandemic)

In the 2020–22 season, Étoile Sportive du Sahel is competing in the Ligue 1 for the 66th season, as well as the Tunisian Cup. It is their 67th consecutive season in the top flight of Tunisian football. They are competing in Ligue 1, the Champions League and the Tunisian Cup.

== Squad list ==
Players and squad numbers last updated on 13 August 2021.
Note: Flags indicate national team as has been defined under FIFA eligibility rules. Players may hold more than one non-FIFA nationality.

No.	Nat.	Position	Name	Date of Birth (Age)	Signed from
Goalkeepers
1	(Tunisia)	GK	Aymen Mathlouthi	14 September 1984 (aged 36)	(Saudi Arabia) Al-Adalah FC
16	(Tunisia)	GK	Rami Gabsi	31 July 1999 (aged 21)	(Tunisia) ES Hammam-Sousse
	(Tunisia)	GK	Walid Kridene	4 May 1996 (aged 24)	(Tunisia) US Ben Guerdane
Defenders
2	(Tunisia)	CB	Saddam Ben Aziza	8 February 1991 (aged 29)	(Tunisia) AS Gabès
3	(Tunisia)	LB	Ghofrane Naouali	15 June 1999 (aged 21)	(Tunisia) Youth system
4	(Mali)	CB	Mohamed Konaté	20 October 1992 (aged 28)	(Morocco) Nahdat Berkane
5	(Tunisia)	CB	Abdelrazek Bouazra	8 July 1998 (aged 22)	(Tunisia) JS Kairouan
6	(Tunisia)	RB	Wajdi Kechrida	5 November 1995 (aged 25)	(Tunisia) Youth system
12	(Tunisia)	LB	Mortadha Ben Ouanes	2 July 1994 (aged 26)	(Tunisia) CA Bizertin
13	(Tunisia)	CB	Bahaeddine Sellami	6 February 1997 (aged 23)	(Tunisia) US Ben Guerdane
21	(Tunisia)	CB	Salah Harrabi	25 January 1999 (aged 21)	(Tunisia) Youth system
26	(Tunisia)	RB	Jaouhar Ben Hassen	15 August 1997 (aged 23)	(Tunisia) US Ben Guerdane
	(Tunisia)	CB	Ramez Aouani	8 June 1999 (aged 21)	(Tunisia) JS Kairouan
	(Tunisia)	LB	Baligh Jemmali	1 December 2000 (aged 20)	(Tunisia) Youth system
	(Tunisia)	LB	Houssem Souissi	8 January 1999 (aged 21)	(Tunisia) JS Kairouan
	(Algeria)	RB	Houcine Benayada	8 August 1992 (aged 28)	(Algeria) CS Constantine
	(Tunisia)	RB	Anas Sassi	5 December 1998 (aged 22)	(Tunisia) JS Kairouan
Midfielders
7	(Tunisia)	CM	Hamza Lahmar	28 May 1990 (aged 30)	(Tunisia) Youth system
10	(Tunisia)	AM	Iheb Msakni	13 July 1988 (aged 32)	(Lebanon) Al Ahed FC
14	(Libya)	CM	Abdallah Dagou	21 September 2000 (aged 20)	(Tunisia) Youth system
17	(Tunisia)	AM	Yassine Chikhaoui	21 September 1986 (aged 34)	(Qatar) Al Ahli SC
18	(Tunisia)	AM	Fraj Kayramani	22 January 1999 (aged 21)	(Tunisia) Youth system
19	(Tunisia)	DM	Ayoub Ayed	4 January 2000 (aged 20)	(Tunisia) Youth system
20	(Tunisia)	DM	Malek Baayou	29 April 1999 (aged 21)	(Tunisia) Youth system
25	(Algeria)	DM	Salim Boukhanchouche	6 October 1991 (aged 29)	(Saudi Arabia) Abha Club
29	(Tunisia)	DM	Mohamed Amine Ben Amor	3 May 1992 (aged 28)	(Tunisia) Youth system
	(Cameroon)	DM	Jacques Mbé	17 June 1999 (aged 21)	(Tunisia) Youth system
	(Tunisia)	DM	Mohamed Belhaj Mahmoud	24 April 2000 (aged 20)	(Tunisia) Youth system
	(Tunisia)	CM	Achref Afli	6 November 1997 (aged 23)	(Tunisia) ES Hammam-Sousse
	(Tunisia)	LM	Yassine Amri	18 August 1995 (aged 25)	(Tunisia) Club Africain
	(Tunisia)	AM	Oussama Abid	10 August 2002 (aged 18)	(Tunisia) Youth system
	(Tunisia)	LM	Yosri Hamza	2 March 1999 (aged 22)	(Tunisia) Youth system
Forwards
8	(Guinea)	LW	Aly Soumah	10 January 2000 (aged 20)	(Tunisia) Youth system
9	(Ivory Coast)	ST	Souleymane Coulibaly	26 December 1994 (aged 26)	(Scotland) Partick Thistle
11	(Algeria)	ST	Redouane Zerdoum	1 January 1999 (aged 22)	(Algeria) NA Hussein Dey
15	(Tunisia)	RW	Aymen Sfaxi	23 December 1995 (aged 25)	(Tunisia) Stade Tunisien
23	(Tunisia)	ST	Fakhreddine Ouji	7 July 1998 (aged 22)	(Tunisia) Youth system
24	(Tunisia)	LW	Wadhah Zaidi	29 September 1998 (aged 22)	(Tunisia) US Tataouine
30	(Venezuela)	RW	Darwin González	20 May 1994 (aged 26)	(Venezuela) Deportivo La Guaira
	(Tunisia)	LW	Firas Iffia	19 May 1997 (aged 23)	(Tunisia) Olympique Béja
	(Algeria)	RW	Tayeb Meziani	27 February 1996 (aged 24)	(Tunisia) Espérance de Tunis
	(Algeria)	RW	Zinedine Boutmène	21 October 2000 (aged 20)	(Algeria) NA Hussein Dey

== Competitions ==
=== Overview ===
Competition	Record								Started round	Final position / round	First match	Last match
Competition	G	W	D	L	GF	GA	GD	Win %	Started round	Final position / round	First match	Last match
Ligue 1	26	15	5	6	46	26	+20	57.69	—N/a	Runners–up	6 December 2020	19 May 2021
Tunisian Cup	2	1	0	1	1	1	+0	50.00	Round of 32	Round of 16	6 May 2021	30 May 2021
Confederation Cup	10	5	3	2	12	7	+5	50.00	First round	Group stage	22 December 2020	28 April 2021
Total	38	21	8	9	59	34	+25	55.26				

Updated to match played 13 August 2021
Source: Competitions

== Ligue 1 ==
=== League table ===
Pos	Team	Pld	W	D	L	GF	GA	GD	Pts	Qualification or relegation
1	Espérance de Tunis (C)	26	19	3	4	37	16	+21	60	Qualification for Champions League
2	Étoile du Sahel	26	15	5	6	46	26	+20	50	Qualification for Champions League
3	Union de Ben Guerdane	26	10	11	5	25	16	+9	41	Qualification for Confederation Cup
4	Avenir de Soliman	26	11	7	8	35	34	+1	40	
5	Club Sfaxien	26	10	10	6	29	16	+13	40	Qualification for Confederation Cup as Tunisian Cup winners

Source: soccerway.com
Rules for classification: 1) points; 2) head-to-head points; 3) head-to-head goal difference; 4) goal difference; 5) total goals; 6) fairplay ranking; 7) playoff.
(C) Champions

=== Results summary ===
Overall								Home						Away					
Pld	W	D	L	GF	GA	GD	Pts	W	D	L	GF	GA	GD	W	D	L	GF	GA	GD
26	15	5	6	46	26	+20	50	9	3	1	29	10	+19	6	2	5	17	16	+1

Last updated: 19 May 2021.
Source: Competitive matches

=== Results by round ===
Round	1	2	3	4	5	6	7	8	9	10	11	12	13	14	15	16	17	18	19	20	21	22	23	24	25	26
Ground																										
Result																										
Position																										

Updated to match(es) played on 1 July 2021. Source: Competitive matches
A = Away; H = Home; W = Win; D = Draw; L = Loss

=== Matches ===
Win Draw Loss

6 December 2020 Round 1	CA Bizertin	1–2	Étoile du Sahel	Bizerte
14:00	Aouina 38'	Report	Soumah 10'; Sfaxi 63'	Stadium: Stade Ahmed Bsiri; Attendance: 0 (Note: The match was played behind closed doors due to the COVID-19 pandemic in Tunisia.); Referee: Aymen Nasri

12 December 2020 Round 2	Étoile du Sahel	2–0	ES Métlaoui	Métlaoui
14:00	Kechrida 21'; Coulibaly 62'	Report		Stadium: Stade Municipal de Métlaoui; Attendance: 0 Referee: Sadok Selmi

18 December 2020 Round 3	AS Slimane	2–1	Étoile du Sahel	Soliman
14:00	Letifi 72'; Chtioui 81'	Report	Coulibaly 58'	Stadium: Stade municipal Attendance: 0 Referee: Naim Hosni

27 December 2020 Round 4	Étoile du Sahel	3–1	US Monastir	Hammam Sousse
14:00	González 39'; Lahmar 58' (pen.); Boukhanchouche 84' (pen.)	Report	M'hirsi 54'	Stadium: Stade Bou Ali Lahouar; Attendance: 0 Referee: Mehrez Melki

1 January 2021 Round 5	Espérance de Tunis	2–0	Étoile du Sahel	Rades
16:00	Marzouki 28'; Chaalali 90+3'	Report		Stadium: Stade Hammadi Agrebi; Attendance: 0 Referee: Walid Jeridi

28 February 2021 Round 6	Étoile du Sahel	0–1	CS Sfaxien	Hammam Sousse
14:00		Report	Soulah 14'	Stadium: Stade Bou Ali Lahouar; Attendance: 0 Referee: Youssef Sraïri

9 January 2021 Round 7	Étoile du Sahel	0–0	US Tataouine	Hammam Sousse
14:00		Report		Stadium: Stade Bou Ali Lahouar; Attendance: 0 Referee: Mohamed Fanni

12 January 2021 Round 8	Club Africain	1–1	Étoile du Sahel	Rades
14:00	Kassab 76'	Report	Lahmar 29' (pen.)	Stadium: Stade Hammadi Agrebi; Attendance: 0 Referee: Ali Belhadj

24 January 2021 Round 9	Étoile du Sahel	2–0	AS Rejiche	Hammam Sousse
14:00	Ben Ouanes 9'; Harrabi 74'	Report		Stadium: Stade Bou Ali Lahouar; Attendance: 0 Referee: Nidhal Letaif

27 January 2021 Round 10	JS Kairouan	1–3	Étoile du Sahel	Kairouan
14:00	Amri 6'	Report	Coulibaly 31' (pen.), 62'; Sfaxi 52'	Stadium: Stade Hamda Laouani; Attendance: 0 Referee: Wassim Ben Salah

31 January 2022 Round 11	Étoile du Sahel	1–0	Stade Tunisien	Hammam Sousse
14:00	Coulibaly 90+5'	Report		Stadium: Stade Bou Ali Lahouar; Attendance: 0 Referee: Ali Belhadj

3 February 2022 Round 12	Étoile du Sahel	2–1	US Ben Guerdane	Hammam Sousse
14:00	Ayed 2'; Coulibaly 71'	Report	Sayari 86'	Stadium: Stade Bou Ali Lahouar; Attendance: 0 Referee: Oussema Benisaak

7 February 2022 Round 13	Olympique Béja	1–2	Étoile du Sahel	Béja
14:00	Hedhli 4' (pen.)	Report	Coulibaly 35'; Ouji 59'	Stadium: Stade Boujemaa Kmiti; Attendance: 0 Referee: Naim Hosni

24 March 2022 Round 14	Étoile du Sahel	4–0	CA Bizertin	Hammam Sousse
14:00	Meziani 45+1'; Amri 53' (pen.); Sfaxi 59', 61'	Report		Stadium: Stade Bou Ali Lahouar; Attendance: 0 Referee: Mehrez Melki

3 March 2022 Round 15	ES Métlaoui	1–1	Étoile du Sahel	Métlaoui
14:00	Abogo 76'	Report	Lahmar 90+4' (pen.)	Stadium: Stade Municipal de Métlaoui; Attendance: 0 Referee: Wassim Ben Salah

7 March 2022 Round 16	Étoile du Sahel	2–0	AS Slimane	Hammam Sousse
14:00	Zerdoum 45+1'; Meziani 90+3'	Report		Stadium: Stade Bou Ali Lahouar; Attendance: 0 Referee: Walid Jridi

14 April 2022 Round 17	US Monastir	3–1	Étoile du Sahel	Monastir
14:30	Mhirsi 19'; Aloui 55'; Ben Romdhane 90+6'	Report	El Omrani 2' (o.g.)	Stadium: Stade Mustapha Ben Jannet; Attendance: 0 Referee: Mohamed Fanni

13 March 2021 Round 18	Étoile du Sahel	2–0	Espérance de Tunis	Hammam Sousse
14:00	Sfaxi 4'; Ben Ouanes 51'	Report		Stadium: Stade Bou Ali Lahouar; Attendance: 0 Referee: Nidhal Letaïef

18 April 2022 Round 19	CS Sfaxien	1–2	Étoile du Sahel	Sfax
14:30	Camara 68'	Report	Lahmar 35' (pen.); Sfaxi 55'	Stadium: Stade Taïeb Mhiri; Attendance: 0 Referee: Oussema Benisaak

21 March 2022 Round 20	US Tataouine	1–3	Étoile du Sahel	Tataouine
13:00	Sylla 39'	Report	Meziani 15', 27', 66'	Stadium: Stade Nejib Khattab; Attendance: 0 Referee: Oussema Benisaak

31 March 2022 Round 21	Étoile du Sahel	2–2	Club Africain	Hammam Sousse
15:00	Meziani 49'; Sfaxi 68'	Report	Labidi 71' (pen.); Khalifa 78'	Stadium: Stade Bou Ali Lahouar; Attendance: 0 Referee: Sadok Selmi

2 May 2022 Round 22	AS Rejiche	0–1	Étoile du Sahel	Mahdia
14:30		Report	Coulibaly 42'	Attendance: 0 Referee: Khaled Gouider

7 April 2022 Round 23	Étoile du Sahel	5–1	JS Kairouan	Hammam Sousse
15:00	Msakni 1', 10'; Chikhaoui 8'; Boutmène 49', 64'	Report	Ragoubi 11'	Stadium: Stade Bou Ali Lahouar; Attendance: 0 Referee: Aymen Nasri

5 May 2022 Round 24	Stade Tunisien	1–0	Étoile du Sahel	Le Bardo
14:30	Ayouni 8'	Report		Stadium: Stade Chedli Zouiten; Attendance: 0 Referee: Nidhal Letaif

9 May 2022 Round 25	US Ben Guerdane	1–0	Étoile du Sahel	Ben Guerdane
14:30	Brigui 6'	Report		Stadium: Stade du 7 Mars; Attendance: 0 Referee: Walid Jridi

19 May 2022 Round 26	Étoile du Sahel	4–4	Olympique Béja	Hammam Sousse
15:00	Belhaj Mahmoud 16'; Sfaxi 42' (pen.), 73' (pen.); Abid 50'	Report	Bessan 53', 90+5'; Fraj 70' (pen.); Ben Jaballah 80'	Stadium: Stade Bou Ali Lahouar; Attendance: 0 Referee: Naim Hosni

== Tunisian Cup ==
6 May 2021 Round of 32	Espérance Sportive de Tunis	0–1	Étoile du Sahel	Radès
15:00		Report	Mbé 35'	Stadium: Stade Olympique de Radès; Attendance: 0 (close doors); Referee: Aymen Nasri

30 May 2021 Round of 16	ES Zarzis	1–0	Étoile du Sahel	Zarzis
15:00	Dehiouech 89'			Stadium: Stade Jlidi; Attendance: 0 (close doors); Referee: Mehrez Melki

== Confederation Cup ==
=== First round ===
22 December 2020 First leg	Al Mokawloon Al Arab (Egypt)	0–0	(Tunisia) Étoile du Sahel	Cairo
18:00 UTC+2		Report		Stadium: Osman Ahmed Osman Stadium; Attendance: 0 (close doors); Referee: Abdulrazig Ahmed (Libya)

6 January 2021 Second leg	Étoile du Sahel (Tunisia)	2–1	(Egypt) Al Mokawloon Al Arab	Monastir
18:00 UTC+1	Coulibaly 22', 87' (pen.)	Report	Jaziri 51'	Stadium: Stade Mustapha Ben Jannet; Attendance: 0 (close doors); Referee: Noureddine El Jaafari (Morocco)

=== Play-off round ===
14 February 2021 First leg	Young Buffaloes (Eswatini)	1–2	(Tunisia) Étoile du Sahel	Manzini
16:00 UTC+2	Matsebula 86'	Report	Coulibaly 6', 74'	Stadium: Trade Fair Ground; Referee: Ali Mohamed Adelaid (Comoros)

23 February 2021 Second leg	Étoile du Sahel (Tunisia)	2–0	(Eswatini) Young Buffaloes	Sfax
16:00 UTC+1	Chikhaoui 79'; Belhaj Mahmoud 87'	Report		Stadium: Stade Taïeb Mhiri; Referee: Ibrahim Nour El Din (Egypt)

=== Group stage ===
==== Group C ====
Pos	Team	Pld	W	D	L	GF	GA	GD	Pts	Qualification	JAR	CSS	ETS	SAL
1	(Senegal) ASC Jaraaf	6	3	2	1	5	3	+2	11	Advance to knockout stage	—	1–1	1–0	2–0
2	(Tunisia) CS Sfaxien	6	2	4	0	6	3	+3	10	Advance to knockout stage	0–0	—	2–2	1–0
3	(Tunisia) Étoile du Sahel	6	2	2	2	6	5	+1	8		2–0	0–0	—	2–1
4	(Burkina Faso) Salitas	6	1	0	5	2	8	−6	3		0–1	0–2	1–0	—

Source: Soccerway

10 March 2021 Matchday 1	Étoile du Sahel (Tunisia)	2–0	(Senegal) ASC Jaraaf	Radès (Note: Étoile du Sahel played their home matches at Stade Olympique de Radès, Radès, instead of their regular home stadium Stade Olympique de Sousse, Sousse, which was undergoing renovation.)
16:00 (17:00 UTC+1)	Lahmar 65', 90+3' (pen.)	Report		Stadium: Stade Olympique de Radès; Attendance: 0 (close doors); Referee: Ahmed El Ghandour (Egypt)

17 March 2021 Matchday 2	Salitas (Burkina Faso)	1–0	(Tunisia) Étoile du Sahel	Ouagadougou
16:00 (16:00 UTC+0)	Boissy 82'	Report		Stadium: Stade du 4 Août; Referee: Messie Nkounkou (Congo)

4 April 2021 Matchday 3	Étoile du Sahel (Tunisia)	0–0	(Tunisia) CS Sfaxien	Radès
16:00 (17:00 UTC+1)		Report		Stadium: Stade Olympique de Radès; Attendance: 0 (close doors); Referee: Nabil Boukhalfa (Algeria)

11 April 2021 Matchday 4	CS Sfaxien (Tunisia)	2–2	(Tunisia) Étoile du Sahel	Sfax
16:00 (17:00 UTC+1)	Ghouma 68'; Chaouat 90+3' (pen.)	Report	Sfaxi 10'; Kechrida 32'	Stadium: Stade Taïeb Mhiri; Attendance: 0 (close doors); Referee: Samir Guezzaz (Morocco)

21 April 2021 Matchday 5	ASC Jaraaf (Senegal)	1–0	(Tunisia) Étoile du Sahel	Thiès
16:00 (16:00 UTC+0)	Paye 25'	Report		Stadium: Stade Lat-Dior; Referee: Fabricio Duarte (Cape Verde)

28 April 2021 Matchday 6	Étoile du Sahel (Tunisia)	2–1	(Burkina Faso) Salitas	Radès
21:00 (22:00 UTC+1)	Lahmar 6'; Coulibaly 47'	Report	Dramé 72'	Stadium: Stade Olympique de Radès; Attendance: 0 (close doors); Referee: Abdulrazig Ahmed (Libya)

== Squad information ==
=== Playing statistics ===
No.	Pos	Nat	Player	Total		Ligue 1		Tunisian Cup		Confederation Cup	
No.	Pos	Nat	Player	Apps	Goals	Apps	Goals	Apps	Goals	Apps	Goals
Goalkeepers
1	GK	(Tunisia) TUN	Aymen Mathlouthi	21	0	14	0	2	0	5	0
16	GK	(Tunisia) TUN	Rami Gabsi	11	0	8	0	0	0	3	0
	GK	(Tunisia) TUN	Walid Kridene	7	0	5	0	0	0	2	0
Defenders
2	DF	(Tunisia) TUN	Saddam Ben Aziza	25	0	15	0	1	0	9	0
3	DF	(Tunisia) TUN	Ghofrane Naouali	15	0	8	0	0	0	7	0
4	DF	(Mali) MLI	Mohamed Konaté	15	0	11	0	0	0	4	0
5	DF	(Tunisia) TUN	Abdelrazek Bouazra	2	0	1	0	0	0	1	0
6	DF	(Tunisia) TUN	Wajdi Kechrida	30	2	20	1	2	0	8	1
12	DF	(Tunisia) TUN	Mortadha Ben Ouanes	30	2	19	2	2	0	9	0
13	DF	(Tunisia) TUN	Bahaeddine Sellami	12	0	8	0	0	0	4	0
21	DF	(Tunisia) TUN	Salah Harrabi	19	1	15	1	0	0	4	0
26	DF	(Tunisia) TUN	Jaouhar Ben Hassen	1	0	0	0	0	0	1	0
	DF	(Tunisia) TUN	Baligh Jemmali	10	0	8	0	1	0	1	0
	DF	(Algeria) ALG	Houcine Benayada	13	0	11	0	2	0	0	0
	DF	(Tunisia) TUN	Anas Sassi	0	0	0	0	0	0	0	0
	DF	(Tunisia) TUN	Mohamed Belhaj Mahmoud	24	2	16	1	2	0	6	1
Midfielders
7	MF	(Tunisia) TUN	Hamza Lahmar	22	7	15	4	2	0	5	3
10	MF	(Tunisia) TUN	Iheb Msakni	18	2	13	2	0	0	5	0
14	MF	(Libya) LBA	Abdallah Dagou	11	0	9	0	0	0	2	0
17	MF	(Tunisia) TUN	Yassine Chikhaoui	17	2	11	1	0	0	6	1
18	MF	(Tunisia) TUN	Fraj Kayramani	25	0	17	0	1	0	7	0
19	MF	(Tunisia) TUN	Ayoub Ayed	27	1	19	1	1	0	7	0
20	MF	(Tunisia) TUN	Malek Baayou	13	0	8	0	2	0	3	0
25	MF	(Algeria) ALG	Salim Boukhanchouche	9	1	6	1	0	0	3	0
29	MF	(Tunisia) TUN	Mohamed Amine Ben Amor	12	0	8	0	0	0	4	0
	MF	(Cameroon) CMR	Jacques Mbé	21	1	12	0	1	1	8	0
	MF	(Tunisia) TUN	Yassine Amri	6	1	6	1	0	0	0	0
	MF	(Tunisia) TUN	Oussama Abid	3	1	2	1	0	0	1	0
Forwards
8	FW	(Guinea) GUI	Aly Soumah	8	1	5	1	0	0	3	0
9	FW	(Ivory Coast) CIV	Souleymane Coulibaly	32	13	24	8	0	0	8	5
11	FW	(Algeria) ALG	Redouane Zerdoum	14	1	10	1	2	0	2	0
15	FW	(Tunisia) TUN	Aymen Sfaxi	29	10	19	9	2	0	8	1
23	FW	(Tunisia) TUN	Fakhreddine Ouji	20	1	14	1	1	0	5	0
	FW	(Algeria) ALG	Tayeb Meziani	14	6	12	6	2	0	0	0
	FW	(Algeria) ALG	Zinedine Boutmène	11	2	9	2	2	0	0	0
Players transferred out during the season
30	FW	(Venezuela) VEN	Darwin González	7	1	5	1	0	0	2	0

Source: fr.soccerway.com

=== Goalscorers ===
Includes all competitive matches. The list is sorted alphabetically by surname when total goals are equal.

No.	Nat.	Player	Pos.	L 1	TC	CC 3	TOTAL
	(Ivory Coast)	Souleymane Coulibaly	FW	8	0	5	13
	(Tunisia)	Aymen Sfaxi	FW	9	0	1	10
	(Tunisia)	Hamza Lahmar	MF	4	0	3	7
	(Algeria)	Tayeb Meziani	FW	6	0	0	6
	(Tunisia)	Mortadha Ben Ouanes	DF	2	0	0	2
	(Algeria)	Zinedine Boutmène	FW	2	0	0	2
	(Tunisia)	Iheb Msakni	MF	2	0	0	2
	(Tunisia)	Mohamed Belhaj Mahmoud	MF	1	0	1	2
	(Tunisia)	Yassine Chikhaoui	MF	1	0	1	2
	(Tunisia)	Wajdi Kechrida	DF	1	0	1	2
	(Tunisia)	Oussama Abid	MF	1	0	0	1
	(Tunisia)	Yassine Amri	MF	1	0	0	1
	(Tunisia)	Ayoub Ayed	MF	1	0	0	1
	(Algeria)	Salim Boukhanchouche	MF	1	0	0	1
	(Venezuela)	Darwin González	FW	1	0	0	1
	(Tunisia)	Salah Harrabi	DF	1	0	0	1
	(Tunisia)	Fakhreddine Ouji	FW	1	0	0	1
	(Guinea)	Aly Soumah	FW	1	0	0	1
	(Cameroon)	Jacques Mbé	FW	0	1	0	1
	(Algeria)	Redouane Zerdoum	FW	1	0	0	1
Own Goals				1	0	0	1
Totals				46	1	12	59

== Transfers ==
=== In ===
Date	Pos	Player	From club	Transfer fee	Source
3 February 2021	FW	(Algeria) Zinedine Boutmène	NA Hussein Dey	Free transfer	
3 February 2021	FW	(Algeria) Tayeb Meziani	Espérance Sportive de Tunis	Undisclosed	
11 February 2021	DF	(Algeria) Houcine Benayada	Club Africain	Free transfer	

=== Out ===
Date	Pos	Player	To club	Transfer fee	Source
12 March 2021	FW	(Venezuela) Darwin González	(Venezuela) Deportivo La Guaira	Free transfer	
