= 2020–21 Tunisian Ligue Professionnelle 1 =

Tunisian Ligue Professionnelle 1
- Season: 2020–21
- Dates: 6 December 2020 – 19 May 2021
- Champions: Espérance de Tunis (31st title)
- Relegated: Stade Tunisien; Jeunesse Kairouanaise
- Champions League: Espérance de Tunis; Étoile du Sahel
- Confederation Cup: Union de Ben Guerdane; Club Sfaxien (as Tunisian Cup winners)
- Matches: 182
- Goals: 376 (2.07 per match)
- Top goalscorer: Aymen Sfaxi (9 goals)
- Biggest home win: Étoile du Sahel 5–1 Jeunesse Kairouanaise (7 April 2021)
- Biggest away win: Jeunesse Kairouanaise 0–4 Stade Tunisien (20 December 2020); Jeunesse Kairouanaise 0–4 Club Sfaxien (3 February 2021)
- Highest scoring: Étoile du Sahel 4–4 Olympique Béja (19 May 2021)
- Longest winning run: Espérance de Tunis (9 matches)
- Longest unbeaten run: Club Africain (14 matches)
- Longest winless run: Jeunesse Kairouanaise (26 matches)
- Longest losing run: Jeunesse Kairouanaise (9 matches)

The 2020–21 Tunisian Ligue Professionnelle 1 (Tunisian Professional League) season was the 66th season of top-tier football in Tunisia. Espérance de Tunis were the champions, winning the title for the fifth consecutive season and the 31st time in their history (a national record).

== Teams ==
A total of 14 teams contested the league.

=== Stadiums and locations ===
Locations of the 2020–21 Ligue 1 teams

Team	Location	Stadium	Capacity
Avenir de Rejiche	Rejiche	Stade Municipal de Rejiche	3,000
Avenir de Soliman	Soliman	Stade Municipal de Soliman	3,000
Club Africain	Tunis	Stade Hammadi Agrebi	65,000
Club Bizertin	Bizerte	Stade 15 Octobre	20,000
Club Sfaxien	Sfax	Stade Taïeb Mhiri	22,000
Étoile de Métlaoui	Métlaoui	Stade Municipal de Métlaoui	6,000
Étoile du Sahel	Sousse	Stade Bou Ali Lahouar	6,500
Espérance de Tunis	Tunis	Stade Hammadi Agrebi	65,000
Jeunesse Kairouanaise	Kairouan	Stade Ali Zouaoui	15,000
Olympique Béja	Béja	Stade Boujemaa Kmiti	10,000
Stade Tunisien	Tunis (Le Bardo)	Stade Chedly Zouiten	20,000
Union de Ben Guerdane	Ben Guerdane	Stade du 7 Mars	10,000
Union Monastirienne	Monastir	Stade Mustapha Ben Jannet	25,000
Union de Tataouine	Tataouine	Stade Nejib Khattab	5,000

=== Personnel and kits ===
Teams	Managers	Captain	Kit manufacturer	Shirt sponsor
Avenir de Rejiche	(Tunisia) Saïd Saïbi		(Tunisia) Kampio	Booga, Vitalait
Avenir de Soliman	(Tunisia) Yamen Zelfani	(Tunisia) Rached Arfaoui	(United States) New Balance	Délice
Club Africain	(Tunisia) Montassar Louichi	(Tunisia) Wissem Ben Yahia	(England) Umbro	Qatar Airways, ZEN, Ooredoo
Club Bizertin	(Tunisia) Larbi Zouaoui	(Tunisia) Halim Darragi	(Germany) Uhlsport	Délice
Club Sfaxien	(Spain) José Murcia	(Tunisia) Aymen Dahmen	(Italy) Macron	Tunisie Cables
Étoile du Sahel	(Tunisia) Lassad Dridi	(Tunisia) Yassine Chikhaoui	(Italy) Macron	Warda
Étoile de Métlaoui	(Tunisia) Kais Yâakoubi		(Tunisia) Sportiga	
Espérance de Tunis	(Tunisia) Mouin Chaâbani	(Tunisia) Khalil Chemmam	(England) Umbro	Délice, Tunisie Télécom
Olympique Béja	(Tunisia) Chaker Meftah		(Germany) Uhlsport	Boga, Délic Danone, Ooredoo
Jeunesse Kairouanaise	(Tunisia) Mourad Okbi		(United States) New Balance	Boga, Sabrine
Stade Tunisien	(Tunisia) Nassif Bayaoui	(Tunisia) Ali Jemal	(Italy) Legea	Sabrine
Union de Ben Guerdene	(Tunisia) Hassen Gabsi	(Tunisia) Yassine Boufalgha	(Tunisia) Kampio	Coca-Cola
Union Monastirienne	(Tunisia) Afouène Gharbi	(Tunisia) Zied Machmoum	(Denmark) Hummel	Saida, BIAT
Union de Tataouine	(Tunisia) Hammadi Daou		(Spain) Legea	Coca-Cola, Hayet

=== Managerial changes ===
Team	Outgoing manager	Manner of departure	Date of vacancy	Position in table	Incoming manager	Date of appointment
Club Sfaxien	(Tunisia) Faouzi Benzarti	club changing	15 November 2020	Pre-season	(Tunisia) Anis Boujelbene	15 November 2020
Club Bizertin	(Tunisia) Mokhtar Trabelsi	sacked	23 December 2020	14th	(Tunisia) Larbi Zouaoui	23 December 2020
Club Africain	(Tunisia) Lassaad Dridi	resignation	3 January 2021	11th	(Tunisia) Kais Yâakoubi	1 February 2021
Stade Tunisien	(Tunisia) Anis Boussaïdi	sacked	4 January 2021	7th	(Tunisia) Nassif Bayaoui	4 January 2021
Étoile du Sahel	(Brazil) Jorvan Vieira	sacked	11 January 2021	6th	(Tunisia) Lassaad Dridi	11 January 2021
Avenir de Soliman	(Tunisia) Sami Gafsi	sacked	14 January 2021	7th	(Tunisia) Yemen Zelfani	11 January 2021
Olympique Béja	(Tunisia) Chaker Meftah	sacked	26 January 2021	9th	(Tunisia) Khaled Ben Yahia	27 January 2021
Club Africain	(Tunisia) Kais Yâakoubi	resignation	14 February 2021	13th	(Tunisia) Montasser Louhichi	12 February 2021
Club Sfaxien	(Tunisia) Anis Boujelbene	resignation	4 March 2021	3rd	(Spain) José Murcia	4 March 2021
Olympique Béja	(Tunisia) Khaled Ben Yahia	sacked	14 March 2021	10th	(Tunisia) Chiheb Ellili	15 March 2021
Union Monastirienne	(Tunisia) (Austria) Lassaad Chabbi	resignation	4 April 2021	7th	(Tunisia) Afouène Gharbi	6 April 2021

=== Foreign players ===
Nationality	Number of Players
Algeria	20
Ivory Coast	8
Libya	8
Guinea	5
Mali	4
Ghana	4
Cameroon	3
Nigeria	3
Brazil	2
(Democratic Republic of the Congo) DR Congo	2
(Benin) Bénin	2
France	2
Morocco	2
Senegal	2
Niger	1
Mauritania	1
Sweden	1
Switzerland	1
Venezuela	1

== League table ==
Pos	Team	Pld	W	D	L	GF	GA	GD	Pts	Qualification or relegation
1	Espérance de Tunis (C)	26	19	3	4	37	16	+21	60	Qualification for Champions League
2	Étoile du Sahel	26	15	5	6	46	26	+20	50	Qualification for Champions League
3	Union de Ben Guerdane	26	10	11	5	25	16	+9	41	Qualification for Confederation Cup
4	Avenir de Soliman	26	11	7	8	35	34	+1	40	
5	Club Sfaxien	26	10	10	6	29	16	+13	40	Qualification for Confederation Cup as Tunisian Cup winners
6	Avenir de Rejiche	26	9	9	8	27	23	+4	36	
7	Club Africain	26	7	12	7	26	30	−4	33	
8	Union de Tataouine	26	8	9	9	24	30	−6	33	
9	Étoile de Métlaoui	26	8	8	10	17	21	−4	32	
10	Union Monastirienne	26	8	7	11	28	29	−1	31	
11	Club Bizertin	26	8	7	11	21	27	−6	31	
12	Olympique Béja	26	7	10	9	25	26	−1	31	
13	Stade Tunisien (R)	26	6	11	9	22	22	0	29	Relegation to Ligue 2
14	Jeunesse Kairouanaise (R)	26	0	3	23	14	60	−46	3	Relegation to Ligue 2

Source: soccerway.com
Rules for classification: 1) points; 2) head-to-head points; 3) head-to-head goal difference; 4) goal difference; 5) total goals; 6) fairplay ranking; 7) playoff.
(C) Champions; (R) Relegated

== Results ==
Home \ Away	ASR	ASS	CA	CAB	CSS	ESM	ESS	EST	JSK	OB	ST	USBG	USM	UST
Avenir de Rejiche		3–1	1–1	1–0	3–3	1–0	0–1	0–1	2–0	0–1	0–0	1–1	1–0	2–0
Avenir de Soliman	2–1		2–1	2–0	1–1	1–0	2–1	0–2	2–1	1–0	1–2	2–2	0–0	3–1
Club Africain	1–1	2–1		1–0	0–0	0–1	1–1	1–1	4–2	1–1	2–2	1–0	1–3	2–2
Club Bizertin	1–1	2–1	1–1		1–1	1–1	1–2	2–0	0–0	1–0	1–0	0–1	0–2	2–1
Club Sfaxien	1–0	0–1	3–0	0–0		2–1	1–2	2–0	2–0	0–0	3–0	1–1	2–1	1–2
Étoile de Métlaoui	0–3	2–1	0–0	1–0	0–1		1–1	1–2	2–0	0–2	1–0	0–0	2–0	1–0
Étoile du Sahel	2–0	2–0	2–2	4–0	0–1	2–0		2–0	5–1	4–4	1–0	2–1	3–1	0–0
Espérance de Tunis	2–0	2–2	1–0	1–0	0–0	1–2	2–0		3–1	1–0	2–1	1–0	1–0	1–0
Jeunesse Kairouanaise	0–1	2–3	1–2	1–4	0–4	1–1	1–3	0–3		0–1	0–4	1–3	0–1	0–1
Olympique Béja	0–0	2–2	2–0	0–1	1–0	1–0	1–2	1–4	1–1		1–1	1–1	3–0	0–1
Stade Tunisien	0–0	1–1	0–1	2–0	1–0	0–0	1–0	0–1	2–0	2–2		0–0	0–0	2–3
Union de Ben Guerdane	2–1	2–0	2–0	0–1	1–0	0–0	1–0	0–1	2–0	1–0	0–0		3–2	1–1
Union Monastirienne	2–3	2–2	0–1	2–2	0–0	1–0	3–1	0–1	1–0	2–0	0–0	0–0		4–0
Union de Tataouine	1–1	0–1	0–0	1–0	0–0	0–0	1–3	1–3	3–1	0–0	2–1	0–0	3–1	

Source: soccerway.com
Legend: Blue = home team win; Yellow = draw; Red = away team win.

== Positions by round ==
Team ╲ Round	1	2	3	4	5	6	7	8	9	10	11	12	13	14	15	16	17	18	19	20	21	22	23	24	25	26
ASR	1	4	9	7	5	6	5	4	4	6	6	6	5	5	5	5	5	4	5	6	5	5	6	6	6	6
ASS	5	10	8	9	8	9	7	6	5	4	5	6	6	6	6	7	6	7	7	7	6	6	5	4	4	4
CA	2	9	10	10	11	11	11	12	13	13	13	13	13	12	13	13	12	12	12	12	12	10	9	9	10	7
CAB	11	14	14	14	13	13	13	12	12	12	12	12	12	13	12	12	13	13	13	13	13	13	13	13	13	12
CSS	2	3	1	3	2	2	2	2	2	2	3	2	2	2	3	3	3	3	4	4	4	4	4	5	5	5
ESM	9	9	7	6	8	6	8	7	6	8	10	11	11	11	10	11	11	11	11	11	9	9	10	12	11	9
ESS	2	1	4	2	5	6	6	5	5	4	3	3	3	3	2	2	2	2	2	2	2	2	2	2	2	2
EST	5	4	3	1	1	1	1	1	1	1	1	1	1	1	1	1	1	1	1	1	1	1	1	1	1	1
JSK	11	10	13	14	14	14	14	14	14	14	14	14	14	14	14	14	14	14	14	14	14	14	14	14	14	14
OB	5	11	11	8	6	7	7	8	6	8	8	9	8	8	8	6	8	10	10	8	8	8	8	8	9	11
ST	5	7	1	4	5	6	5	7	9	8	8	9	9	9	11	9	9	8	8	9	10	11	11	10	12	13
USBG	9	5	6	8	5	5	4	4	4	4	4	4	4	4	4	4	4	5	3	3	3	3	3	3	3	3
USM	11	13	13	12	12	12	9	10	8	7	7	7	7	7	7	8	7	6	6	5	7	7	7	7	7	10
UST	14	13	12	11	10	9	11	10	10	11	11	11	10	10	9	10	10	9	9	10	11	12	12	11	8	8

Leader
2021–22 CAF Champions League
2021–22 CAF Confederation Cup
Relegation to Ligue Professionnelle 2 2021-22

Source: besoccer.com

== Clubs season-progress ==
Team ╲ Round	1	2	3	4	5	6	7	8	9	10	11	12	13	14	15	16	17	18	19	20	21	22	23	24	25	26
Avenir de Rejiche	W	D	L	D	W	L	W	L	W	W	W	W	L	D	D	D	D	W	L	L	W	L	D	W	L	D
Avenir de Soliman	D	L	W	L	W	L	W	W	W	W	L	D	W	L	D	L	W	L	W	D	W	L	W	W	W	D
Club Africain	W	D	L	D	L	L	D	D	L	L	L	L	D	W	D	D	D	W	D	W	D	W	W	D	D	W
Club Bizertin	L	L	L	W	D	L	D	W	D	L	D	L	W	L	W	D	L	L	W	L	W	D	D	W	W	W
Club Sfaxien	W	D	W	L	W	W	L	W	D	W	D	W	W	D	L	D	D	L	L	D	D	D	W	L	W	D
Étoile de Métlaoui	D	L	W	W	D	W	D	W	W	L	L	W	L	D	D	D	D	W	D	L	W	D	L	L	W	W
Étoile du Sahel	W	W	L	W	L	L	D	D	W	W	W	W	W	W	D	W	L	W	W	W	D	W	W	L	L	D
Espérance de Tunis	D	W	W	W	W	W	W	L	W	W	W	W	W	W	W	W	W	L	W	W	D	W	W	D	L	L
Jeunesse Kairouanaise	L	D	L	L	L	L	L	L	L	L	D	L	L	L	L	L	D	L	L	L	L	L	L	L	L	L
Olympique Béja	D	D	W	W	D	D	W	L	L	L	L	W	L	D	W	D	D	L	L	W	L	W	L	D	D	D
Stade Tunisien	D	W	W	D	L	D	W	D	L	D	L	L	D	D	L	W	D	W	D	D	L	L	D	W	L	L
Union de Ben Guerdane	D	W	D	L	W	D	W	D	W	D	W	L	W	D	W	W	L	L	W	D	D	W	D	D	W	L
Union Monastirienne	L	L	D	L	D	D	W	D	W	W	W	W	D	D	L	L	W	W	D	W	L	L	L	L	L	D
Union de Tataouine	L	D	L	D	D	W	D	D	L	L	L	W	W	D	W	L	D	W	L	L	D	D	L	W	W	W

W = Win; D = Draw; L = Lose

== Season statistics ==
=== Goals scored per round ===
This graph represents the number of goals scored during each round:

=== Top scorers ===
Rank	Goalscorer	Club	Goals
1	(Tunisia) Aymen Sfaxi	ESS	9
2	(Guinea) Alia Sylla	UST	8
2	(Ivory Coast) Souleymane Coulibaly	ESS	8
4	(Tunisia) Idriss Mhirsi	USM	7
4	(Tunisia) Nidhal Ben Salem	ASR	7
4	(Tunisia) Firas Chaouat	CSS	7
4	(Algeria) Tayeb Meziani	ESS	7
4	(Mali) Aboubacar Diarra	ASR	7
4	(Benin) Jacques Bessan	OB	7
4	(Tunisia) Taha Yassine Khenissi	EST	7

=== Hat-tricks ===
Player	Club	Against	Result	Date
(Algeria) Tayeb Meziani	Étoile du Sahel	Union de Tataouine	1-3 (A)	21 March 2021

== Number of teams by Governorate ==
Position	Governorate	Number	Teams
1	Tunis	3	Espérance de Tunis, Club Africain, Stade Tunisien
2	Sousse	1	Étoile du Sahel
2	Sfax	1	Club Sfaxien
2	Bizerte	1	Club Bizertin
2	Monastir	1	Union Monastirienne
2	Mahdia	1	Avenir de Rejiche
2	Nabeul	1	Avenir de Soliman
2	Tataouine	1	Union de Tataouine
2	Medenine	1	Union de Ben Guerdane
2	Kairouan	1	Jeunesse Kairouanaise
2	Béja	1	Olympique Béja
2	Gafsa	1	Étoile de Métlaoui

== Awards ==
Each month Internet users vote for the player of the month sponsored by Foot24 and Coca-Cola.

Month	Player of the Month	
Month	Player	Club
December	(Libya) Hamdou Elhouni	Espérance de Tunis
January	(Ivory Coast) Souleymane Coulibaly	Étoile du Sahel
February	(Libya) Mohammed Soulah	Club Sfaxien
March	(Tunisia) Mohamed Ali Ben Romdhane	Espérance de Tunis
April	(Tunisia) Hamza Agrebi	Club Africain
May	(Tunisia) Saber Khalifa	Club Africain

== Media coverage ==
Tunisian Ligue Professionnelle 1 Media Coverage
Country	Television Channel	Matches
Tunisia	El Wataniya 1 El Wataniya 2	From 2 to 5 Matches per round
Qatar	Al-Kass Sports Channel	Main Matches
Saudi Arabia	ART	From 2 to 5 Matches per round

== See also ==
- 2020–21 Tunisian Ligue Professionnelle 2
- 2020–21 Tunisian Cup
