= Tunisia at the 2022 FIFA World Cup =

This article relates the participation of Tunisia during the 2022 FIFA World Cup organized in Qatar from 20 November to 18 December 2022. This is the country's sixth participation in the competition after 1978, 1998, 2002, 2006 and 2018. Tunisia meets France, Denmark and Australia in Group D. For the sixth time, Tunisia failed to qualify for the second round of the World Cup, as Tunisia finished the tournament ranked 21st after a 0–0 draw with Denmark, a 0–1 defeat against Australia and a 1–0 victory over France.

== Qualification ==
=== Summary ===
Tunisia, which only has to intervene in the second round, meets Mauritania, Equatorial Guinea and Zambia. With four wins, a draw and a defeat, the third round is reached, but this is not effective until the day of the last match. The third round is played over two legs and Tunisia take on Mali, the only third-round contender who has never qualified for a World Cup. In the first leg, they took the lead over Mali in the 36th minute thanks to an own goal from Moussa Sissako, who received a red card four minutes later. The Tunisians finished 1–0, so a goalless draw in the second leg was enough for them to qualify. A total of 29 players are used; twenty of them are also in the squad for the 2021 Africa Cup of Nations, during which Tunisia are eliminated in the quarter-finals. Only Aïssa Laïdouni and Ali Maâloul have played all eight matches. Mohamed Ali Ben Romdhane plays seven games, but is not used in the first game. Farouk Ben Mustapha is the goalkeeper in all second round matches, but Bechir Ben Saïd, who is making his Africa Cup debut, plays in the third round. Sebastian Tounekti (one game) makes his first international appearance in qualifying. The top scorer is captain Wahbi Khazri with three goals, all scored in the second round. He received a second yellow card in the last match of the second round and was replaced by Youssef Msakni in the third round. In total, eight players have scored at least one goal, plus an own goal by a Malian player, which allows Tunisia to qualify for the World Cup.

=== Second Round ===
The draw for the ten groups will be held on 21 January 2020 in Cairo. The teams are divided into four pots according to their FIFA ranking. The second round was supposed to start in March 2020, but is postponed several times due to the COVID-19 pandemic and does not start until September 2021. On 3 September 2021, the national team begins its matches in the 2022 World Cup qualifiers. Tunisia wins the first three matches without conceding a goal, against Equatorial Guinea in Radès 3–0, against Zambia in Ndola 2–0 and against Mauritania 3–0, followed by a draw against the latter in Nouakchott 0–0 and a defeat against Equatorial Guinea in Malabo 0–1, which postpones the qualification for the next round on the last day. Coach Mondher Kebaier faces heavy criticism from fans. This time the team's opponent is Equatorial Guinea. If the two countries are level on points before the last match, Equatorial Guinea draw 1–1 against Mauritania while Tunisia secures first place in its group with a victory 3–1 over Zambia, qualification for the third round being achieved on 16 November, Tunisia concluding the pool matches with four wins, one draw and one loss. During the three matches which take place at the Hammadi Agrebi Stadium, all are played behind closed doors due to the health protocol of the COVID-19 pandemic, in particular the match of the last day against Zambia, which the public had to attend before the refusal of the Confederation of African Football.

Pos	Team	Pld	W	D	L	GF	GA	GD	Pts	Qualification
1	Tunisia	6	4	1	1	11	2	+9	13	Advance to third round
2	Equatorial Guinea	6	3	2	1	6	5	+1	11	
3	Zambia	6	2	1	3	8	9	−1	7	
4	Mauritania	6	0	2	4	2	11	−9	2	

Source: FIFA, Soccerway
Rules for classification: Tiebreakers

3 September 2021	Tunisia	3–0	Equatorial Guinea	Tunis, Tunisia
20:00 UTC+1	Bronn 54'; Skhiri 78'; Khazri 82' (pen.)	Report		Stadium: Hammadi Agrebi Stadium; Referee: Daniel Laryea Nii Ayi (Ghana)

7 September 2021	Zambia	0–2	Tunisia	Ndola, Zambia
15:00 UTC+2		Report	Khazri 8' (pen.); Ben Slimane 90+2'	Stadium: Levy Mwanawasa Stadium; Attendance: 5,000; Referee: Eric Otogo-Castane (Gabon)

7 October 2021	Tunisia	3–0	Mauritania	Tunis, Tunisia
20:00 UTC+1	Skhiri 15'; Khazri 42'; Jaziri 86'	Report		Stadium: Hammadi Agrebi Stadium; Referee: Bamlak Tessema Weyesa (Ethiopia)

10 October 2021	Mauritania	0–0	Tunisia	Nouakchott, Mauritania
19:00 UTC+0		Report		Stadium: Stade Olympique de Nouakchott; Referee: Mehdi Abid Charef (Algeria)

13 November 2021	Equatorial Guinea	1–0	Tunisia	Malabo, Equatorial Guinea
17:00 UTC+1	Ganet 84'	Report		Stadium: Estadio de Malabo; Referee: Boubou Traoré (Mali)

16 November 2021	Tunisia	3–1	Zambia	Tunis, Tunisia
20:00 UTC+1	Laïdouni 18'; Dräger 31'; Maâloul 43'	Report	Sakala 80'	Stadium: Hammadi Agrebi Stadium; Referee: Pacifique Ndabihawenimana (Burundi)

=== Third Round ===
The matches are knockout round robin matches. The five winners of the confrontations are qualified for the 2022 World Cup in Qatar. The draw for the third round, initially scheduled for 18 December takes place on 22 January 2022 in Douala, during the 2021 Africa Cup of Nations. Mondher Kebaier is sacked following the elimination of Tunisia in the quarter of final at the African Cup of Nations and replaced by Jalel Kadri. In the first leg at the Stade du 26 Mars in Bamako, Tunisia won 1–0 thanks to an own goal by Moussa Sissako on pressure from Msakni. As for the return match at the Hammadi Agrebi Stadium, in front of 50,000 spectators, it ended in a draw 0–0, so that the team qualified for the World Cup for the sixth time in its history.

25 March 2022	Mali	0–1	Tunisia	Bamako, Mali
17:00 UTC+0		Report	Sissako 36' (o.g.)	Stadium: Stade du 26 Mars; Attendance: 50,000; Referee: Bamlak Tessema Weyesa (Ethiopia)

29 March 2022	Tunisia	0–0 (1–0 agg.)	Mali	Tunis, Tunisia
20:30 UTC+1		Report		Stadium: Hammadi Agrebi Stadium, Tunis; Attendance: 50,000; Referee: Maguette N'Diaye (Senegal)

=== Qualification statistics ===
==== Matches played ====
Number of matches played in qualifying
Matches	Players
8	Ali Maâloul, Aïssa Laïdouni
7	Mohamed Ali Ben Romdhane, Seifeddine Jaziri
6	Farouk Ben Mustapha, Dylan Bronn, Montassar Talbi, Anis Ben Slimane, Naïm Sliti, Wahbi Khazri
5	Ellyes Skhiri, Ferjani Sassi, Yassine Meriah
4	Hamza Mathlouthi, Ghailene Chaalali, Hamza Rafia, Fakhreddine Ben Youssef, Youssef Msakni
3	Wajdi Kechrida, Mohamed Dräger, Saîf-Eddine Khaoui
2	Bechir Ben Saïd, Nader Ghandri, Saad Bguir, Taha Yassine Khenissi
1	Bilel Ifa, Hannibal Mejbri, Mortadha Ben Ouanes, Sebastian Tounekti
0	Aymen Dahmen, Ali Jemal, Mouez Hassen, Ali Abdi, Moataz Zemzemi, Oussama Haddadi, Issam Jebali

==== Scorers ====
Qualifying goal statistics
Goals	Players	Opponents
3	Wahbi Khazri	Equatorial Guinea, Mauritania, Zambia
2	Ellyes Skhiri	Equatorial Guinea, Mauritania
1	Seifeddine Jaziri	Mauritania
1	Aïssa Laïdouni	Zambia
1	Ali Maâloul	Zambia
1	Anis Ben Slimane	Zambia
1	Dylan Bronn	Equatorial Guinea
1	Mohamed Dräger	Zambia
1 (o.g.)	(Mali) Moussa Sissako	Mali

== Preparation ==
=== Draw ===
The draw for the final phase of the 2022 World Cup takes place on 1 April 2022 at the Doha Exhibition Centre. Tunisia are assigned to Pot 3 and could be drawn against defending champions Brazil, France, Germany or hosts Qatar. Tunisia meet France, Denmark and Australia in Group D.

The Tunisians haven't scored against any of these teams in their previous World Cup appearances. There have been four friendlies against France, two draws and two losses, and the Tunisians have faced the France B team twice at the Mediterranean Games, winning and losing once. They lost to Denmark at the 1960 Summer Olympics and in preparation for the 2002 World Cup; they also lost to Australia in a friendly match and won the 2005 Confederations Cup.

=== Preparation matches ===
reparations start early, as the team plays two matches for the 2023 Africa Cup of Nations qualification, the first against Equatorial Guinea in Radès 4–0 victory and the second against Botswana in Francistown draw 0–0. Subsequently, the team is set to play the 2022 Kirin Cup Soccer in Japan from 10 to 14 June 2022, with the participation of three other teams: Japan, Chile and Ghana. In the semi-finals, Tunisia beat Chile 2–0 and then Japan 3–0 and thus won the title for the first time.

Ferjani Sassi was named the tournament's best player, while his compatriot Issam Jebali finished top scorer with two goals. After that, the team played two friendlies: the first against Comoros, which ended in victory 1–0, and the second which ended in a heavy loss against Brazil 5–1. The Carthage Eagles end their preparations with a victory against Iran with a score of 2–0 a few days before the world cup, the match not being broadcast and taking place behind closed doors at the request of the Iranian federation.

2 June 2023 AFCON qualification	Tunisia	4–0	Equatorial Guinea	Tunis, Tunisia
20:00 UTC+1	Sliti 56'; Jaziri 77'; Msakni 80', 85'	Report		Stadium: Hammadi Agrebi Stadium; Referee: Pacifique Ndabihawenimana (Burundi)

5 June 2023 AFCON qualification	Botswana	0–0	Tunisia	Francistown, Botswana
15:00 UTC+2		Report		Stadium: Francistown Stadium; Referee: Mohamed Athoumani (Comoros)

10 June 2022 Kirin Cup Soccer	Chile	0–2	Tunisia	Kobe, Japan
15:15 UTC+9		Report (JFA)	Abdi 41'; Jebali 89'	Stadium: Noevir Stadium Kobe; Attendance: 4,973; Referee: Tanimoto Ryo (Japan)

14 June 2022 Kirin Cup Soccer	Japan	0–3	Tunisia	Osaka, Japan
18:55 UTC+9		Report (JFA); Report (Soccerway)	Ben Romdhane 55' (pen.); Sassi 76'; Jebali 90+3'	Stadium: Panasonic Stadium Suita; Attendance: 31,292; Referee: Ahmed Eisa Darwish (United Arab Emirates)

22 September Friendly	Tunisia	1−0	Comoros	Croissy-sur-Seine, France
16:30 CEST (UTC+2)	Khenissi 59'	Report		Stadium: Stade Omnisports Du Chemin De Ronde; Referee: Gabriel Henry (France)

27 September Friendly	Brazil	5–1	Tunisia	Paris, France
20:30 CEST (UTC+2)	Raphinha 11', 40'; Richarlison 19'; Neymar 29' (pen.); Pedro 74'	Report	Talbi 18'	Stadium: Parc des Princes; Referee: Ruddy Buquet (France)

16 November Friendly	Iran	0–2	Tunisia	Doha, Qatar
16:00 UTC+3		Report	Sliti 62' (pen.); Abdi 69'	Stadium: Al Rayyan SC Training Stadium; Attendance: 0

== Team ==
=== Squad ===
Tunisia announced their final squad on 14 November 2022.

No.	Pos.	Player	Date of birth (age)	Caps	Goals	Club
1	GK	Aymen Mathlouthi	14 September 1984 (aged 38)	73	0	(Tunisian Football Federation) Étoile du Sahel
2	DF	Bilel Ifa	9 March 1990 (aged 32)	37	0	(Kuwait Football Association) Kuwait SC
3	DF	Montassar Talbi	26 May 1998 (aged 24)	23	1	(French Football Federation) Lorient
4	DF	Yassine Meriah	2 July 1993 (aged 29)	61	3	(Tunisian Football Federation) Espérance de Tunis
5	MF	Nader Ghandri	18 February 1995 (aged 27)	8	0	(Tunisian Football Federation) Club Africain
6	DF	Dylan Bronn	19 June 1995 (aged 27)	36	2	(Italian Football Federation) Salernitana
7	FW	Youssef Msakni (captain)	28 October 1990 (aged 32)	88	17	(Qatar Football Association) Al-Arabi
8	MF	Hannibal Mejbri	21 January 2003 (aged 19)	19	0	(The Football Association) Birmingham City
9	FW	Issam Jebali	25 December 1991 (aged 30)	10	2	(Danish Football Association) OB
10	FW	Wahbi Khazri	8 February 1991 (aged 31)	72	24	(French Football Federation) Montpellier
11	FW	Taha Yassine Khenissi	6 January 1992 (aged 30)	48	9	(Kuwait Football Association) Kuwait SC
12	DF	Ali Maâloul	1 January 1990 (aged 32)	83	2	(Egyptian Football Association) Al Ahly
13	MF	Ferjani Sassi	18 March 1992 (aged 30)	78	6	(Qatar Football Association) Al-Duhail
14	MF	Aïssa Laïdouni	13 December 1996 (aged 25)	25	1	(Hungarian Football Federation) Ferencváros
15	MF	Mohamed Ali Ben Romdhane	6 September 1999 (aged 23)	23	1	(Tunisian Football Federation) Espérance de Tunis
16	GK	Aymen Dahmen	28 January 1997 (aged 25)	5	0	(Tunisian Football Federation) CS Sfaxien
17	MF	Ellyes Skhiri	10 May 1995 (aged 27)	49	3	(German Football Association) 1. FC Köln
18	MF	Ghailene Chaalali	28 February 1994 (aged 28)	31	1	(Tunisian Football Federation) Espérance de Tunis
19	FW	Seifeddine Jaziri	12 February 1993 (aged 29)	29	10	(Egyptian Football Association) Zamalek
20	DF	Mohamed Dräger	25 June 1996 (aged 26)	34	3	(Swiss Football Association) Luzern
21	DF	Wajdi Kechrida	5 November 1995 (aged 27)	19	0	(Hellenic Football Federation) Atromitos
22	GK	Bechir Ben Saïd	29 November 1992 (aged 29)	10	0	(Tunisian Football Federation) US Monastir
23	FW	Naïm Sliti	27 July 1992 (aged 30)	69	14	(Saudi Arabian Football Federation) Al-Ettifaq
24	DF	Ali Abdi	20 December 1993 (aged 28)	10	2	(French Football Federation) Caen
25	FW	Anis Ben Slimane	16 March 2001 (aged 21)	25	4	(Danish Football Association) Brøndby
26	GK	Mouez Hassen	5 March 1995 (aged 27)	20	0	(Tunisian Football Federation) Club Africain

=== Kit ===
Italian company Kappa unveils the national team uniform on 29 September 2022. The front decorations of the shirt form the shield of Carthaginian general Hannibal Barca.

Home	Away	Goalkeeper 1	Goalkeeper 2

== Group stage ==
=== Group D ===
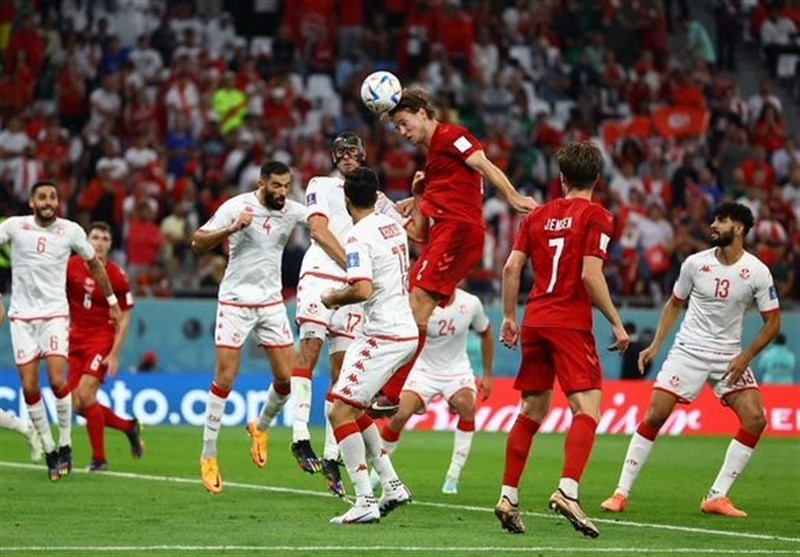
Tunisia v Denmark.

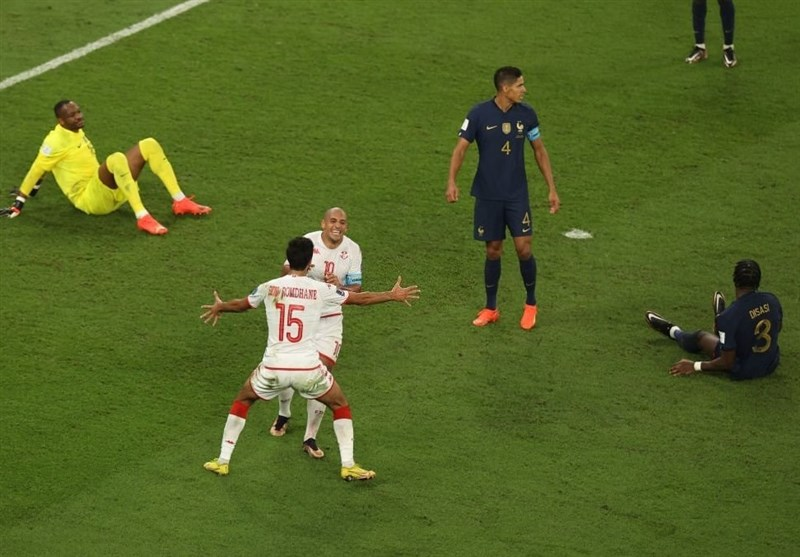
Wahbi Khazri celebrates his goal against France.

In the first match in Group D, Mohamed Dräger threatens the opponent's goal, then Issam Jebali dominates Kasper Schmeichel, but the situation is prevented by an offside. In the 43rd minute, Jebali comes face to face with Schmeichel after hitting the goal and tries to beat the goalkeeper with a through shot, but he uses his thumbs and fends off the finish. Christian Eriksen then makes an attempt beyond the goal line, but Aymen Dahmen is illustrated with a save. From the corner that follows, Andreas Cornelius wastes an opportunity by finding himself alone at the far post, but his header only seals the structure of the goals. Due to the subsequent dominance over the ball, despite their best efforts, the Danes could not find a solution against the Tunisia defence, and the match ended in a goalless draw. Thanks to his performance in this match, Aïssa Laïdouni receives the man of the match award.

In the second match, the team are led to a 1–0 loss against Australia, with the technical framework and the players receiving criticism due to the weakness of the midfield and the attack, which reduces the chances of Tunisia to qualify for the round of 16. In the final game against world champions France, Wahbi Khazri put Tunisia ahead in the 58th minute with a low shot to the bottom right corner. At this stage, Tunisia is in a position to qualify in the group. However, two minutes later, Australia took the lead against Denmark in the other match, which sent Tunisia out of the knockout stage. Captain Khazri wins the Man of the Match award. This is Tunisia's first victory against a European team in the World Cup, and the team have collected the most points (four points) in the group stage since their first appearance in 1978 FIFA World Cup (three points). In this context, Wahbi Khazri is retiring from international retirement, after 74 games in which he scored 25 goals.

==== Standings ====
Pos	Team	Pld	W	D	L	GF	GA	GD	Pts	Qualification
1	France	3	2	0	1	6	3	+3	6	Advance to knockout stage
2	Australia	3	2	0	1	3	4	−1	6	Advance to knockout stage
3	Tunisia	3	1	1	1	1	1	0	4	
4	Denmark	3	0	1	2	1	3	−2	1	

Source: FIFA
Rules for classification: Group stage tiebreakers

In the round of 16:

- The winners of Group D, France, advanced to play the runners-up of Group C, Poland.
- The runners-up of Group D, Australia, advanced to play the winners of Group C, Argentina.

==== Denmark vs Tunisia ====
The two teams had faced each other twice, most recently in 2002, a 2–1 win for Denmark in a friendly game. Denmark were not able to capitalize in their opening game; although Tunisia failed to score a single goal themselves, they still managed to secure their match without problems, with Aïssa Laïdouni earning the Man of the Match.

22 November 2022
16:00

Denmark	0–0	Tunisia
	Report

Education City Stadium, Al Rayyan
Attendance: 42,925
Referee: César Arturo Ramos (Mexico)

Denmark	Tunisia

GK	1	Kasper Schmeichel
CB	2	Joachim Andersen
CB	4	Simon Kjær (c)		(substituted off) 65'
CB	6	Andreas Christensen
DM	8	Thomas Delaney		(substituted off) 45+1'
CM	23	Pierre-Emile Højbjerg
CM	10	Christian Eriksen
RW	13	Rasmus Kristensen	(yellow card) 24'
LW	5	Joakim Mæhle
CF	11	Andreas Skov Olsen		(substituted off) 65'
CF	12	Kasper Dolberg		(substituted off) 65'
Substitutions:
MF	14	Mikkel Damsgaard		(substituted on) 45+1'
FW	21	Andreas Cornelius		(substituted on) 65'
MF	7	Mathias Jensen	(yellow card) 78'	(substituted on) 65'
MF	25	Jesper Lindstrøm		(substituted on) 65'
Manager:
Kasper Hjulmand

GK	16	Aymen Dahmen
CB	6	Dylan Bronn
CB	4	Yassine Meriah
CB	3	Montassar Talbi
RM	20	Mohamed Dräger		(substituted off) 88'
CM	17	Ellyes Skhiri
CM	14	Aïssa Laïdouni		(substituted off) 88'
LM	24	Ali Abdi
AM	25	Anis Ben Slimane		(substituted off) 67'
AM	7	Youssef Msakni (c)		(substituted off) 80'
CF	9	Issam Jebali		(substituted off) 80'
Substitutions:
FW	23	Naïm Sliti		(substituted on) 67'
MF	8	Hannibal Mejbri		(substituted on) 80'
FW	11	Taha Yassine Khenissi	(yellow card) 86'	(substituted on) 80'
DF	21	Wajdi Kechrida		(substituted on) 88'
MF	13	Ferjani Sassi		(substituted on) 88'
Manager:
Jalel Kadri

Man of the Match:
Aïssa Laïdouni (Tunisia)

Assistant referees:
Alberto Morín (Mexico)
Miguel Hernández (Mexico)
Fourth official:
Saíd Martínez (Honduras)
Reserve assistant referee:
Walter López (Honduras)
Video assistant referee:
Fernando Guerrero (Mexico)
Assistant video assistant referees:
Armando Villarreal (United States)
Gabriel Chade (Argentina)
Juan Martínez Munuera (Spain)
Stand-by assistant video assistant referee:
Mahmoud Abouelregal (Egypt)

==== Tunisia vs Australia ====
The two teams had faced each other twice, most recently in Tunisia's 2–0 win at the 2005 FIFA Confederations Cup.

Australia beat Tunisia 1–0 as a result of a Mitchell Duke header in the 23rd minute to secure their first win in a World Cup match since they defeated Serbia 2–1 in 2010. This was also Australia's first clean sheet since they drew 0–0 with Chile in 1974.

26 November 2022
13:00

Tunisia	0–1	Australia
	Report	Duke 23'

Al Janoub Stadium, Al Wakrah
Attendance: 41,823
Referee: Daniel Siebert (Germany)

Tunisia	Australia

GK	16	Aymen Dahmen
CB	6	Dylan Bronn		(substituted off) 73'
CB	4	Yassine Meriah
CB	3	Montassar Talbi
RM	20	Mohamed Dräger		(substituted off) 46'
CM	17	Ellyes Skhiri
CM	14	Aïssa Laïdouni	(yellow card) 26'	(substituted off) 67'
LM	24	Ali Abdi	(yellow card) 64'
AM	23	Naïm Sliti
AM	7	Youssef Msakni (c)
CF	9	Issam Jebali		(substituted off) 73'
Substitutions:
MF	13	Ferjani Sassi	(yellow card) 90+3'	(substituted on) 46'
FW	10	Wahbi Khazri		(substituted on) 67'
DF	21	Wajdi Kechrida		(substituted on) 73'
FW	11	Taha Yassine Khenissi		(substituted on) 73'
Manager:
Jalel Kadri

GK	1	Mathew Ryan (c)
RB	5	Fran Karačić	(substituted off) 75'
CB	19	Harry Souttar
CB	4	Kye Rowles
LB	16	Aziz Behich
DM	13	Aaron Mooy
CM	22	Jackson Irvine
CM	14	Riley McGree	(substituted off) 64'
RF	7	Mathew Leckie	(substituted off) 85'
CF	15	Mitchell Duke	(substituted off) 64'
LF	23	Craig Goodwin	(substituted off) 85'
Substitutions:
FW	9	Jamie Maclaren	(substituted on) 64'
MF	10	Ajdin Hrustic	(substituted on) 64'
DF	2	Miloš Degenek	(substituted on) 75'
FW	11	Awer Mabil	(substituted on) 85'
MF	26	Keanu Baccus	(substituted on) 85'
Manager:
Graham Arnold

Man of the Match:
Mitchell Duke (Australia)

Assistant referees:
Rafael Foltyn (Germany)
Jan Seidel (Germany)
Fourth official:
Saíd Martínez (Honduras)
Reserve assistant referee:
Karen Díaz Medina (Mexico)
Video assistant referee:
Bastian Dankert (Germany)
Assistant video assistant referees:
Marco Fritz (Germany)
Corey Parker (United States)
Pol van Boekel (Netherlands)
Stand-by assistant video assistant referee:
Kathryn Nesbitt (United States)

==== Tunisia vs France ====
The two teams had faced each other four times, most recently in 2010 friendly, a 1–1 draw.

Wahbi Khazri put Tunisia into the lead in the 58th minute with a low shot to the bottom right corner. At that stage, Tunisia was in a position to qualify from the group. However, two minutes later Australia went in front against Denmark in the other match taking place at the same time, which put Tunisia outside of the qualifying positions. In added time, Antoine Griezmann scored to seemingly make it 1–1 with a volley but the goal was ruled out by VAR for offside. Australia went on to beat Denmark, which meant that Tunisia finished third in the group and failed to get into the knockout stage for the sixth consecutive World Cup.

30 November 2022
18:00

Tunisia	1–0	France
Khazri 58'	Report

Education City Stadium, Al Rayyan
Attendance: 43,627
Referee: Matthew Conger (New Zealand)

Tunisia	France

GK	16	Aymen Dahmen
CB	4	Yassine Meriah
CB	5	Nader Ghandri
CB	3	Montassar Talbi
RM	21	Wajdi Kechrida	(yellow card) 28'
CM	17	Ellyes Skhiri
CM	14	Aïssa Laïdouni
LM	12	Ali Maâloul
RW	25	Anis Ben Slimane		(substituted off) 83'
LW	15	Mohamed Ali Ben Romdhane		(substituted off) 74'
CF	10	Wahbi Khazri (c)		(substituted off) 60'
Substitutions:
FW	9	Issam Jebali		(substituted on) 60'
MF	18	Ghailene Chaalali		(substituted on) 74'
DF	24	Ali Abdi		(substituted on) 83'
Manager:
Jalel Kadri

GK	16	Steve Mandanda
RB	3	Axel Disasi
CB	4	Raphaël Varane (c)	(substituted off) 63'
CB	24	Ibrahima Konaté
LB	25	Eduardo Camavinga
RM	13	Youssouf Fofana	(substituted off) 73'
CM	8	Aurélien Tchouaméni
CM	15	Jordan Veretout	(substituted off) 63'
LM	6	Matteo Guendouzi	(substituted off) 79'
CF	20	Kingsley Coman	(substituted off) 63'
CF	12	Randal Kolo Muani
Substitutions:
DF	17	William Saliba	(substituted on) 63'
FW	10	Kylian Mbappé	(substituted on) 63'
MF	14	Adrien Rabiot	(substituted on) 63'
FW	7	Antoine Griezmann	(substituted on) 73'
FW	11	Ousmane Dembélé	(substituted on) 79'
Manager:
Didier Deschamps

Man of the Match:
Wahbi Khazri (Tunisia)

Assistant referees:
Mark Rule (New Zealand)
Tevita Makasini (Tonga)
Fourth official:
Salima Mukansanga (Rwanda)
Reserve assistant referee:
Neuza Back (Brazil)
Video assistant referee:
Abdulla Al-Marri (Qatar)
Assistant video assistant referees:
Muhammad Taqi (Singapore)
Taleb Al-Marri (Qatar)
Fernando Guerrero (Mexico)
Stand-by assistant video assistant referee:
Saud Al-Maqaleh (Qatar)

== Statistics ==
=== Playing time ===
Players	(Denmark)	(Australia)	(France)	TT	Goal		MJ	MT	Legend
Goalkeepers									Legend
Aymen Mathlouthi	–	–	–	–	–	–	0	0	TT : Total minutes played MJ : Number of matches played MT : Matches played as a starter : Goal : Assist; (substituted on) : Player on (substituted off) : Player off : Captain; (yellow card) : Yellow card (red card) : Red card
Aymen Dahmen	90	90	90	270	–	–	3	3	TT : Total minutes played MJ : Number of matches played MT : Matches played as a starter : Goal : Assist; (substituted on) : Player on (substituted off) : Player off : Captain; (yellow card) : Yellow card (red card) : Red card
Bechir Ben Saïd	–	–	–	–	–	–	0	0	TT : Total minutes played MJ : Number of matches played MT : Matches played as a starter : Goal : Assist; (substituted on) : Player on (substituted off) : Player off : Captain; (yellow card) : Yellow card (red card) : Red card
Mouez Hassen	–	–	–	–	–	–	0	0	TT : Total minutes played MJ : Number of matches played MT : Matches played as a starter : Goal : Assist; (substituted on) : Player on (substituted off) : Player off : Captain; (yellow card) : Yellow card (red card) : Red card
Defenders									TT : Total minutes played MJ : Number of matches played MT : Matches played as a starter : Goal : Assist; (substituted on) : Player on (substituted off) : Player off : Captain; (yellow card) : Yellow card (red card) : Red card
Bilel Ifa	–	–	–	–	–	–	0	0	TT : Total minutes played MJ : Number of matches played MT : Matches played as a starter : Goal : Assist; (substituted on) : Player on (substituted off) : Player off : Captain; (yellow card) : Yellow card (red card) : Red card
Montassar Talbi	90	90	90	270	–	–	3	3	TT : Total minutes played MJ : Number of matches played MT : Matches played as a starter : Goal : Assist; (substituted on) : Player on (substituted off) : Player off : Captain; (yellow card) : Yellow card (red card) : Red card
Yassine Meriah	90	90	90	270	–	–	3	3	TT : Total minutes played MJ : Number of matches played MT : Matches played as a starter : Goal : Assist; (substituted on) : Player on (substituted off) : Player off : Captain; (yellow card) : Yellow card (red card) : Red card
Nader Ghandri	–	–	90	90	–	–	1	1	TT : Total minutes played MJ : Number of matches played MT : Matches played as a starter : Goal : Assist; (substituted on) : Player on (substituted off) : Player off : Captain; (yellow card) : Yellow card (red card) : Red card
Dylan Bronn	90	(substituted off) 73	–	163	–	–	2	2	TT : Total minutes played MJ : Number of matches played MT : Matches played as a starter : Goal : Assist; (substituted on) : Player on (substituted off) : Player off : Captain; (yellow card) : Yellow card (red card) : Red card
Ali Maâloul	–	–	90	90	–	–	1	1	TT : Total minutes played MJ : Number of matches played MT : Matches played as a starter : Goal : Assist; (substituted on) : Player on (substituted off) : Player off : Captain; (yellow card) : Yellow card (red card) : Red card
Mohamed Dräger	(substituted off) 88	(substituted off) 46	–	134	–	–	2	2	TT : Total minutes played MJ : Number of matches played MT : Matches played as a starter : Goal : Assist; (substituted on) : Player on (substituted off) : Player off : Captain; (yellow card) : Yellow card (red card) : Red card
Wajdi Kechrida	(substituted on) 2	(substituted on) 17	90 (yellow card)	109	–	–	3	1	TT : Total minutes played MJ : Number of matches played MT : Matches played as a starter : Goal : Assist; (substituted on) : Player on (substituted off) : Player off : Captain; (yellow card) : Yellow card (red card) : Red card
Ali Abdi	90	90 (yellow card)	(substituted on) 83	263	–	–	3	2	TT : Total minutes played MJ : Number of matches played MT : Matches played as a starter : Goal : Assist; (substituted on) : Player on (substituted off) : Player off : Captain; (yellow card) : Yellow card (red card) : Red card
Midfielders									TT : Total minutes played MJ : Number of matches played MT : Matches played as a starter : Goal : Assist; (substituted on) : Player on (substituted off) : Player off : Captain; (yellow card) : Yellow card (red card) : Red card
Hannibal Mejbri	(substituted on) 10	–	–	10	–	–	1	0	TT : Total minutes played MJ : Number of matches played MT : Matches played as a starter : Goal : Assist; (substituted on) : Player on (substituted off) : Player off : Captain; (yellow card) : Yellow card (red card) : Red card
Ferjani Sassi	2	(substituted on) 44 (yellow card)	–	46	–	–	2	0	TT : Total minutes played MJ : Number of matches played MT : Matches played as a starter : Goal : Assist; (substituted on) : Player on (substituted off) : Player off : Captain; (yellow card) : Yellow card (red card) : Red card
Aïssa Laïdouni	(substituted off) 88	(substituted off) 67 (yellow card)	90	245	–	1	3	3	TT : Total minutes played MJ : Number of matches played MT : Matches played as a starter : Goal : Assist; (substituted on) : Player on (substituted off) : Player off : Captain; (yellow card) : Yellow card (red card) : Red card
Mohamed Ali Ben Romdhane	–	–	(substituted off) 74	74	–	–	1	1	TT : Total minutes played MJ : Number of matches played MT : Matches played as a starter : Goal : Assist; (substituted on) : Player on (substituted off) : Player off : Captain; (yellow card) : Yellow card (red card) : Red card
Ellyes Skhiri	90	90	90	270	–	–	3	3	TT : Total minutes played MJ : Number of matches played MT : Matches played as a starter : Goal : Assist; (substituted on) : Player on (substituted off) : Player off : Captain; (yellow card) : Yellow card (red card) : Red card
Ghailene Chaalali	–	–	(substituted on) 74	74	–	–	1	0	TT : Total minutes played MJ : Number of matches played MT : Matches played as a starter : Goal : Assist; (substituted on) : Player on (substituted off) : Player off : Captain; (yellow card) : Yellow card (red card) : Red card
Anis Ben Slimane	(substituted off) 67	–	(substituted off) 83	150	–	–	2	2	TT : Total minutes played MJ : Number of matches played MT : Matches played as a starter : Goal : Assist; (substituted on) : Player on (substituted off) : Player off : Captain; (yellow card) : Yellow card (red card) : Red card
Forwards									TT : Total minutes played MJ : Number of matches played MT : Matches played as a starter : Goal : Assist; (substituted on) : Player on (substituted off) : Player off : Captain; (yellow card) : Yellow card (red card) : Red card
Youssef Msakni	(substituted off) 80	90	–	170	–	–	2	2	TT : Total minutes played MJ : Number of matches played MT : Matches played as a starter : Goal : Assist; (substituted on) : Player on (substituted off) : Player off : Captain; (yellow card) : Yellow card (red card) : Red card
Issam Jebali	(substituted off) 80	(substituted off) 73	(substituted on) 60	213	–	–	3	2	TT : Total minutes played MJ : Number of matches played MT : Matches played as a starter : Goal : Assist; (substituted on) : Player on (substituted off) : Player off : Captain; (yellow card) : Yellow card (red card) : Red card
Wahbi Khazri	–	(substituted on) 23	(substituted off) 60	83	1	–	2	1	TT : Total minutes played MJ : Number of matches played MT : Matches played as a starter : Goal : Assist; (substituted on) : Player on (substituted off) : Player off : Captain; (yellow card) : Yellow card (red card) : Red card
Taha Yassine Khenissi	(substituted on) 10 (yellow card)	(substituted on) 17	–	27	–	–	2	0	TT : Total minutes played MJ : Number of matches played MT : Matches played as a starter : Goal : Assist; (substituted on) : Player on (substituted off) : Player off : Captain; (yellow card) : Yellow card (red card) : Red card
Seifeddine Jaziri	–	–	–	–	–	–	0	0	TT : Total minutes played MJ : Number of matches played MT : Matches played as a starter : Goal : Assist; (substituted on) : Player on (substituted off) : Player off : Captain; (yellow card) : Yellow card (red card) : Red card
Naïm Sliti	(substituted on) 23	90	–	113	–	–	2	1	TT : Total minutes played MJ : Number of matches played MT : Matches played as a starter : Goal : Assist; (substituted on) : Player on (substituted off) : Player off : Captain; (yellow card) : Yellow card (red card) : Red card
Total									TT : Total minutes played MJ : Number of matches played MT : Matches played as a starter : Goal : Assist; (substituted on) : Player on (substituted off) : Player off : Captain; (yellow card) : Yellow card (red card) : Red card
Tunisia	90	90	90	270	1	1	–	–	TT : Total minutes played MJ : Number of matches played MT : Matches played as a starter : Goal : Assist; (substituted on) : Player on (substituted off) : Player off : Captain; (yellow card) : Yellow card (red card) : Red card

=== Scorers ===
Goals	Players	Opponents
1	Wahbi Khazri	France

=== Assists ===
Assists	Players	Opponents
1	Aïssa Laïdouni	France

== Controversies ==
=== Threatening to be excluded ===
At the end of October 2022, an internal dispute concerning the Minister of Youth and Sports, Kamel Deguiche, and the president of the federation, Wadie Jary, threatens Tunisia's participation in the World Cup. Indeed, the two men are known to hate each other and the first wishes to dissolve the federation to separate from the second. FIFA systematically penalizes cases of interference in the world of football, it therefore warns the Tunisian federation: by means of a letter, it warns that it reserves the right to exclude Tunisia from the competition in case of taking power over the federation by Deguiche.

=== Allegations of interference in the squad ===
Dozens of news websites in Tunisia reported that coach Jalel Kadri was subjected to pressure during the formation of the Tunisian team's squad for the 2022 World Cup, according to the player Saad Bguir, who was excluded from the final list and who was on the initial list. He also announced his international retirement through a phone call on the TV program Stade Plus on Carthage Plus, until the president of the Tunisian Football Federation, Wadie Jary, left his position. It started when Bilel Ifa was excluded from the list a day before the official announcement, and was later brought back after fans outraged on social media. On 14 November 2022, hundreds of fans greeted the team bus in Doha upon their arrival, but the president of the Federation was insulted in the worst terms.

Also, the selection of four goalkeepers was under pressure from the Tunisian Football Federation to meet the wishes of certain teams on the financial level, FIFA, since the 2010 FIFA World Cup, paying a subsidy to each. team, of which at least one player has been called up in each edition of the competition. On 28 November 2022, former national team player Issam Jemâa said on Radio IFM, that TFF officials had sacrificed one of the players to call four goalkeepers into the final list, as the choice was on Bilel Ifa, who returned to the team after the anger of the fans, Taha Yassine Khenissi, who was medically examined for two hours, so they could find him injured or Seifeddine Jaziri, who was called up due to financial transactions between him and the brother of the president of the TFF, Wajih Jary. In the final, Saad Bguir was abandoned.
