= Rostam Sioud =

French association football player (born 1988)

Personal information
- Date of birth: 11 July 1988 (age 38)
- Position: Goalkeeper

Team information
- Current team: Bizertin
- Number: 8

Senior career*
Years	Team	Apps	(Gls)
2013	Saint-Malo	0	(0)
2013–2014	Vitré	0	(0)
–2016	EM Mahdia		
2016–	Rejiche		
- * Club domestic league appearances and goals as of 14:48, 24 February 2021 (UTC)

Rostam Sioud (Arabic: رستم صيود; born 11 July 1988) is a French footballer who currently plays as a goalkeeper for Rejiche.

== Career statistics ==
=== Club ===
As of 24 February 2021.

Club	Season	League			Cup		Other		Total	
Club	Season	Division	Apps	Goals	Apps	Goals	Apps	Goals	Apps	Goals
Saint-Malo	2012–13	Championnat de France Amateur	0	0	0	0	0	0	0	0
Vitré	2013–14	Championnat de France Amateur	0	0	0	0	0	0	0	0
Rejiche	2020–21	CLP-1	1	0	0	0	0	0	1	0
Career total			1	0	0	0	0	0	1	0
