= Chaker Meftah =

Tunisian football manager

Personal information
- Full name: Chaker Meftah
- Date of birth: 29 September 1957 (age 69)
- Place of birth: Zaghouan, Tunisia

Team information
- Current team: US Ben Guerdane (manager)

Managerial career
- Years: Team
- 2018–2018: That Ras SC
- 2018–2020: AS Soliman
- 2020–2021: Olympique Béja
- 2021–2021: ES Zarzis
- 2021–2021: AS Soliman
- 2021–2022: ES Metlaoui
- 2022–: US Ben Guerdane
- 2024: AS Marsa

Chaker Meftah (Arabic: شاكر مفتاح; (born 29 September 1957) is a Tunisian professional football manager and former player and the current head coach of US Ben Guerdane.
