= Souleymane Coulibaly =

Ivorian footballer (born 1994)

Personal information
- Date of birth: 26 December 1994 (age 31)
- Place of birth: Anguededou Songon, Ivory Coast
- Height: 1.72 m (5 ft 8 in)
- Position: Striker

Youth career
- 2009–2011: Siena
- 2011–2013: Tottenham Hotspur

Senior career*
Years	Team	Apps	(Gls)
2013–2014	Tottenham Hotspur	0	(0)
2013	→ Grosseto (loan)	12	(2)
2014–2015	Bari	0	(0)
2014–2015	→ Pistoiese (loan)	25	(3)
2015–2016	Peterborough United	27	(5)
2016	→ Newport County (loan)	6	(1)
2016–2017	Kilmarnock	21	(8)
2017	Al Ahly	9	(6)
2018–2019	Partick Thistle	3	(0)
2019–2022	Etoile SS	36	(14)
2022–2023	Karmiotissa	29	(3)
2023–2024	ES Sétif	12	(3)
2024	Nuova Florida	0	(0)
2024	Hull United		

International career
2011	Ivory Coast U-17	4	(9)
2016	Ivory Coast U-20	1	(0)
- * Club domestic league appearances and goals as of 11:00, 10 October 2024 (UTC)

Souleymane Coulibaly (born 26 December 1994) is an Ivorian professional footballer who plays as a striker.

== Early life ==
As a 13-year-old, Coulibaly emigrated to Italy to avoid conflict in Ivory Coast. He joined his father who had married an Italian woman.

== Club career ==
=== Siena ===
Soon after arriving in Italy, Coulibaly signed for Junior Camp Arezzo Football Academy, one of the best academies in Tuscany. He played in the Allievi Regionali team and after a few months President Umberto Zerbini suggested his name to Siena. In 2010–11 he played 10 games for the Siena under-19s, scoring once.

=== Tottenham Hotspur ===
On 18 July 2011, Tottenham Hotspur confirmed they had signed Coulibaly following his golden boot-winning performance at the FIFA Under-17 World Cup. He scored for the Tottenham Hotspur XI on his debut against Brighton and Hove Albion in Algarve.

He scored twice in a 7–1 win for Spurs youth over Inter Milan in their second group game of the NextGen Tournament on 31 August 2011. He also opened the scoring in their third group game away at PSV Eindhoven, where they won 2–1. On 22 December 2011, Coulibaly scored an injury-time winner against Stevenage in the FA Youth Cup, followed by a goal in a 2–1 victory over Cardiff City in the fourth round on 11 January 2012. He made his first team debut as a 65th-minute substitute in a pre-season friendly against Stevenage on 18 July 2012.

==== Grosseto (loan) ====
On 25 January 2013, Coulibaly joined Italian Serie B club Grosseto on loan until the end of the season where he scored two goals from 12 appearances.

=== Bari ===
In September 2014, Coulibaly was sold to Bari and was immediately loaned to Pistoiese.

=== Peterborough United ===
Coulibaly was revealed as a Peterborough United player after his trial at the club on 20 July 2015 along with Andrew Fox and Kieran Sadlier. He started in five games for Peterborough, came on nine times as a substitute, and scored a total of eight goals. On 24 March 2016, he joined Newport County on loan until the end of the 2015–16 season. He made his Newport debut on 2 April 2016, starting in a win 1–0 defeat versus Yeovil Town. He scored his first goal for the club on 23 April 2016 against Luton Town.

=== Kilmarnock ===
After leaving Peterborough United it was confirmed in June 2016 that Coulibaly had signed for Scottish Premiership side Kilmarnock. He scored on his debut as Kilmarnock beat Clyde 2–1 in the League Cup. Coulibaly scored 11 goals in 26 appearances for Kilmarnock.

=== Al Ahly ===
After being in talks with two clubs based in Cairo, Egypt, Al Ahly and Zamalek, Coulibaly chose to sign with reigning champions Al Ahly on a three-and-a-half-year contract on 24 January 2017. A transfer fee of £800,000 was paid to Kilmarnock. On 25 May 2017, Coulibaly left Egypt and returned to the UK without telling anyone. On 4 June 2017, Coulibaly posted on Twitter, saying that he had felt oppressed at Al Ahly and had left Egypt because he did not feel safe. After the tweet other African players that played for Al Ahly said that they felt safe and happy, such as Flávio Amado who said "what Coulibaly said made him laugh". Al-Ahly submitted a complaint to FIFA after Coulibaly left the club and requested compensation. On 25 April 2018, a FIFA commission found against Coulibaly, ruling that a fine of $1,436,000 be awarded to Al Ahly.

=== Partick Thistle ===
In August 2018, Coulibaly joined Scottish Championship side Partick Thistle on a deal that is subject to international clearance. The Egyptian Football Association rejected a request for clearance, but FIFA granted a temporary certificate instead in early October. He was released by Partick Thistle in May 2019.

=== Etoile SS ===
In May 2019 he signed for Tunisian club Etoile SS.

=== ES Sétif ===
On 19 August 2023, Coulibaly joined ES Sétif. On 19 February 2024, he left ES Sétif.

=== Hull United AFC ===
In October 2024 he appeared off the bench for Humber Premier League side Hull United versus Hornsea Town, replacing striker Alfie Lazenby. A week later he started his first game for the club in an East Riding Senior Cup tie versus Bridlington Town, who were three divisions above and the current holders of the cup. Coulibaly scored a 84th-minute equaliser for The Citizens to set up a penalty shoot out, which United went on to win 4–5, Coulibaly also scoring one of them.

== International career ==
Souleymane Coulibaly began his international career with Ivory Coast national under-17 football team at the 2011 FIFA U-17 World Cup where he scored nine goals in four matches: one goal against Australia, a poker against Denmark, and a hat-trick in a draw against Brazil. Coulibaly also scored a goal in a 2–3 loss to France in the Round of 16. He held the competition record for most goals scored in one tournament along with French striker Florent Sinama Pongolle (at the earlier held 2001 FIFA U-17 World Championship), who did it in six matches rather than Coulibaly's four. He scored nine of his side's ten goals overall, which meant that he scored every 40 minutes of match time, or slightly more than once per half played. The record has since been broken by Nigerian striker Victor Osimhen, who scored 10 goals in 7 games at the 2015 World Cup.

As a result of his performances, Coulibaly was linked in the media to moves to Manchester United and Real Madrid, before finally moving to Tottenham. He has been labelled the "New Drogba" by the media, in reference to fellow Ivorian footballer Didier Drogba.

Coulibaly made one appearance for the Ivory Coast national under-21 football team, as they lost a friendly 5–1 to France.

== Career statistics ==
As of end of 2022–23 season

Appearances and goals by club, season and competition
Club	Season	League			National cup		League cup		Other		Total	
Club	Season	Division	Apps	Goals	Apps	Goals	Apps	Goals	Apps	Goals	Apps	Goals
Tottenham Hotspur	2012–13	Premier League	0	0	0	0	0	0	0	0	0	0
Tottenham Hotspur	2013–14	Premier League	0	0	0	0	0	0	0	0	0	0
Tottenham Hotspur	Total		0	0	0	0	0	0	0	0	0	0
Grosseto (loan)	2012–13	Serie B	12	2	0	0	0	0	—		12	2
Bari	2014–15	Serie B	0	0	0	0	0	0	—		0	0
Pistoiese (loan)	2014–15	Lega Pro	25	3	0	0	0	0	0	0	25	3
Peterborough United	2015–16	League One	27	5	2	0	2	0	1 (Note: Appearance(s) in Football League Trophy)	0	32	5
Newport County (loan)	2015–16	League Two	6	1	0	0	0	0	0	0	6	1
Kilmarnock	2016–17	Scottish Premiership	21	8	1	0	4	3	—		26	11
Al Ahly	2016–17	Egyptian Premier League	9	6	1	0	—		2 (Note: Appearance(s) in CAF Champions League)	0	12	6
Partick Thistle	2018–19	Scottish Championship	3	0	1	0	0	0	0	0	4	0
Etoile SS	2019–20	Tunisian Ligue Professionnelle	11	5	0	0	—		4	0	15	5
Etoile SS	2020–21	Tunisian Ligue Professionnelle	24	8	0	0	—		8 (Note: Appearance(s) in CAF Confederation Cup)	5	32	13
Etoile SS	2021–22	Tunisian Ligue Professionnelle	1	1	0	0	—		3	1	4	2
Etoile SS	Total		36	14	0	0	—		15	6	51	20
Karmiotissa	2022–23	Cypriot First Division	29	3	2	2	—		—		31	5
Career total			168	42	7	2	6	3	18	6	199	53
