= Sami Gafsi =

Tunisian football manager

Personal information
- Date of birth: 18 March 1980 (age 46)
- Place of birth: Marseille, France

Team information
- Current team: CA Bizertin (manager)

Managerial career
- Years: Team
- 2013–2016: CA Bizertin B
- 2017–2019: SA Menzel Bourguiba
- 2019–2020: AS Gabès
- 2020–2021: AS Soliman
- 2021-2022: Hammam-Lif
- 2021–2022: CA Bizertin
- 2022–2023: Al Urooba Club
- 2024–2025: US Tataouine
- 2024: CA Bizertin

Sami Gafsi is a Tunisian football manager. In 2024, he was the manager for both US Tataouine (UST) as well as CA Bizertin (CAB). He parted ways with CAB later that year and left UST in April 2025. In November 2025, he stepped down as head coach of AS Soliman.
