= Wajdi Kechrida =

Footballer (born 1995)

Personal information
- Full name: Wajdi Kechrida
- Date of birth: 5 November 1995 (age 31)
- Place of birth: Nice, France
- Height: 1.77 m (5 ft 10 in)
- Position: Right-back

Team information
- Current team: Étoile du Sahel
- Number: 28

Senior career*
Years	Team	Apps	(Gls)
2016–2021	Étoile du Sahel	72	(1)
2021–2022	Salernitana	17	(0)
2022–2024	Atromitos	49	(1)
2024–2025	Al-Gharafa	0	(0)
2026-	Étoile du Sahel	9	(0)

International career^{‡}
2015	Tunisia U23	3	(0)
2019–	Tunisia	39	(0)
- * Club domestic league appearances and goals as of 25 June 2026 ‡ National team caps and goals as of 00:35, 10 December 2022 (UTC)

Wajdi Kechrida (Arabic: وجدي كشريدة; born 5 November 1995) is a professional footballer who plays as a right-back. Born in France, he plays for the Tunisia national team.

== Club career ==
Kechrida made his professional debut for Étoile Sportive du Sahel in a 3–0 Tunisian Ligue Professionnelle 1 win over ES Zarzis on 10 September 2016.

On 31 July 2021 he was purchased by U.S. Salernitana 1919, strongly desired by Salernitana's manager Angelo Mariano Fabiani. He made his first appearance in the Coppa Italia match against Reggina, won 2-0 by Salernitana, and his debut in Serie A in the first day of the season against Bologna.

On 29 August 2022, Kechrida signed a two-year contract with Atromitos in Greece.

== International career ==
Kechrida made his debut for the Tunisia in a 2019 Africa Cup of Nations qualification 4–0 win over Eswatini on 22 March 2019.

== Career statistics ==
=== Club ===
As of 5 August 2023

Appearances and goals by club, season and competition
Club	Season	League			Cup		Continental		Other		Total	
Club	Season	Division	Apps	Goals	Apps	Goals	Apps	Goals	Apps	Goals	Apps	Goals
Étoile du Sahel	2016–17	Tunisian Ligue Professionnelle 1	11	0	2	0	4	0	—		17	0
Étoile du Sahel	2017–18	Tunisian Ligue Professionnelle 1	9	0	3	1	8	0	—		20	1
Étoile du Sahel	2018–19	Tunisian Ligue Professionnelle 1	13	0	4	0	11	1	—		28	1
Étoile du Sahel	2019–20	Tunisian Ligue Professionnelle 1	20	0	2	0	7	0	—		29	0
Étoile du Sahel	2020–21	Tunisian Ligue Professionnelle 1	20	1	2	0	8	1	—		30	2
Étoile du Sahel	Total		73	1	13	1	38	2	—		124	4
Salernitana	2021–22	Serie A	17	0	2	0	—		—		19	0
Salernitana	2022–23	Serie A	0	0	1	0	—		—		1	0
Salernitana	Total		17	0	3	0	—		—		20	0
Atromitos	2022–23	Superleague Greece	30	1	2	0	—		—		32	1
Career total			120	2	18	1	38	2	0	0	176	5

=== International ===
As of matches played on 17 July 2025

Appearances and goals by national team and year
National team	Year	Apps	Goals
Tunisia	2019	10	0
2020	2	0	
2021	6	0	
2022	3	0	
2023	8	0	
2024	9	0	
Total		39	0
