= Abdallah Dagou =

Libyan footballer (born 2000)

Personal information
- Full name: Abdallah Abdelrahman Dagou
- Date of birth: 21 September 2000 (age 26)
- Place of birth: Libya
- Position: Midfielder

Team information
- Current team: Al Ahly SC
- Number: 8

Youth career
- 2018–2020: Étoile du Sahel

Senior career*
Years	Team	Apps	(Gls)
2020–2022	Étoile du Sahel	14	(0)
2022-2023	Al-Ittihad	0	(0)
2023-	Al Ahly SC	0	(0)

International career^{‡}
2020–	Libya	5	(0)
- * Club domestic league appearances and goals as of 21 November 2026 ‡ National team caps and goals as of 21 November 2026

Abdallah Abdelrahman Dagou (born 21 September 2000) is a Libyan professional footballer who plays as a midfielder for Libyan club Al Ahly SC and the Libya national team.

== Club career ==
Dagou signed with Étoile du Sahel on 21 October 2018. He made his professional debut with Étoile du Sahel in a 2–0 Tunisian Ligue Professionnelle 1 win over Tataouine on 9 August 2020.

== International career ==
Dagou debuted for the senior Libya national team in a 2–1 friendly loss to Comoros on 11 October 2020.
