= Aymen Sfaxi =

Tunisian professional footballer

Personal information
- Date of birth: 24 April 1995 (age 31)
- Place of birth: Tunisia
- Position: Forward

Youth career
- Étoile du Sahel

Senior career*
Years	Team	Apps	(Gls)
2015–2021	Étoile du Sahel	39	(11)
2015–2016	→ EO Sidi Bouzid (loan)	26	(2)
2018–2020	→ Stade Tunisien (loan)	46	(9)
2021–2024	Future	50	(7)

International career
2014	Tunisia U20	1	(1)
- * Club domestic league appearances and goals as of 2 March 2022

Aymen Sfaxi (born 24 April 1995) is a Tunisian professional footballer who plays as right winger. He previously played for Étoile Sportive du Sahel.

== Club career ==
Sfaxi started his career with the youth team of Étoile Sportive du Sahel. He later joined EO Sidi Bouzid on a one-year loan. He returned from the loan and made his debut in the 2016–17 season. In July 2018, he joined Stade Tunisien on a two-year loan deal. He returned and played for Étoile Sportive du Sahel during the 2020–21 season which he ended as the top scorer in the Tunisian Ligue Professionnelle 1.

After emerging top scorer and based on his performances, he became a transfer target to several clubs in Tunisia and Egypt. On 13 September 2021, he joined Egyptian Premier League Future FC on a three-year deal.

== International career ==
In 2014, Sfaxi was a member of the Tunisia national under-20 team.

== Honours ==
Individual

- Tunisian Ligue Professionelle 1 Top Goalscorer: 2020–21
