= Hamza Lahmar =

Tunisian footballer

Personal information
- Date of birth: 28 May 1990 (age 36)
- Place of birth: Sousse, Tunisia
- Height: 1.77 m (5 ft 9 1/2 in)
- Position: Midfielder

Team information
- Current team: Al-Wehdat

Youth career
- Étoile du Sahel

Senior career*
Years	Team	Apps	(Gls)
2009–2018	Étoile du Sahel	124	(32)
2010–2011	→ ES Zarzis (loan)	1	(0)
2011–2012	→ ES Hammam-Sousse (loan)	18	(2)
2018–2019	Al-Kuwait	18	(8)
2019–2021	Étoile du Sahel	16	(5)
2022–	Al-Wehdat	0	(0)

International career^{‡}
2015–	Tunisia	14	(2)
- * Club domestic league appearances and goals as of 12:29, 17 February 2022 (UTC) ‡ National team caps and goals as of 08:51, 29 April 2021 (UTC)

Hamza Lahmar (born 28 May 1990) is a Tunisian international footballer who plays for Al-Wehdat as a midfielder.

== Club career ==
Lahmar has played for Étoile du Sahel, ES Zarzis, ES Hammam-Sousse and Al-Kuwait. In February 2022 he signed for Al-Wehdat.

== International career ==
He made his international debut in 2015, and was named in the squad for the 2017 Africa Cup of Nations.

== International goals ==
Scores and results list Tunisia's goal tally first.

No	Date	Venue	Opponent	Score	Result	Competition
1.	4 September 2016	Stade Mustapha Ben Jannet, Monastir, Tunisia	Liberia	4–1	4–1	2017 Africa Cup of Nations qualification
2.	4 January 2017	Stade El Menzah, Tunis, Tunisia	Uganda	1–0	2–0	Friendly

== Honours ==
=== Club ===
Étoile Sportive du Sahel

- Tunisian Ligue Professionnelle 1 – 2015–16
- Tunisian Cup – 2012, 2013–14, 2014–15

=== International ===
Tunisia

- CAF Confederation Cup – 2015
