= Bou Ali Lahouar Stadium =

Coordinates: 35°51′18″N 10°35′55″E

- Interactive map of Bou Ali Lahouar Stadium
- Full name: Bou Ali Lahouar Municipal Stadium
- Location: Hammam Sousse, Tunisia
- Capacity: 6,500
- Surface: Grass

Construction
- Opened: 1960

Tenants
- ES Hammam-Sousse; 1965 Africa Cup of Nations

Bou Ali Lahouar Stadium is a stadium in Hammam Sousse, Tunisia. It has a capacity of 6,500 spectators. It is the home of Espoir de Hammam Sousse of the Tunisian Ligue Professionnelle 1. During the 1965 Africa Cup of Nations, it hosted one match of Group B. The game was between Ghana and DR Congo. Ghana won the match 5–2.
