= Radio IFM =

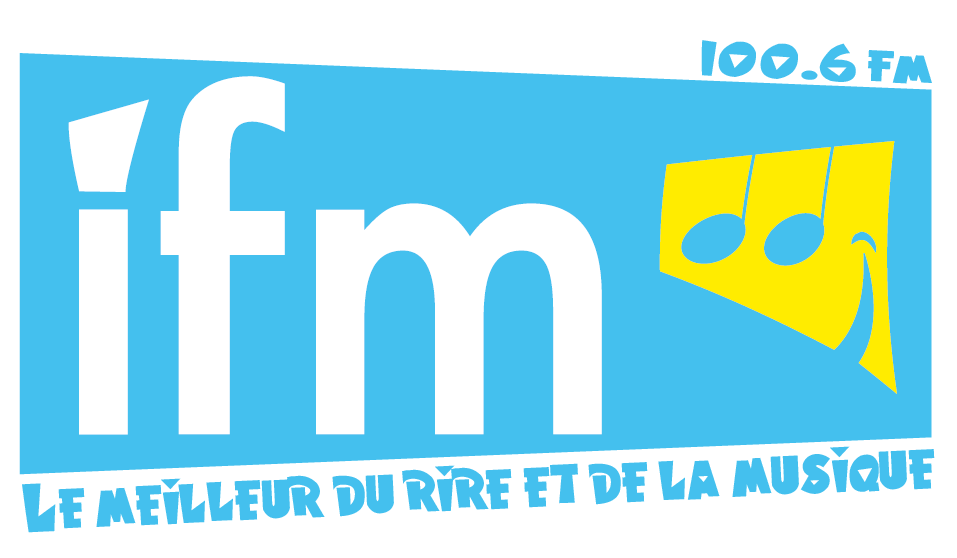

Tunis; Tunisia
- Frequencies: 100.6 MHz (Tunis); 17 total transmitters

Programming
- Language: Arabic, Tunisian Arabic and French

Ownership
- Owner: Hamed Soyah

History
- First air date: 4 November 2011

Links
- Webcast: www.ifm.tn/fr/live
- Website: www.ifm.tn

Radio IFM (Arabic: إذاعة إي أف أم); is a private Tunisian radio station broadcasting on the FM band since November 4, 2011. Founded by Hamed Soyah, it is the country's first radio station on the theme of “laughter and music” its programming thus alternates sketches and songs.
