= Hammam Sousse =

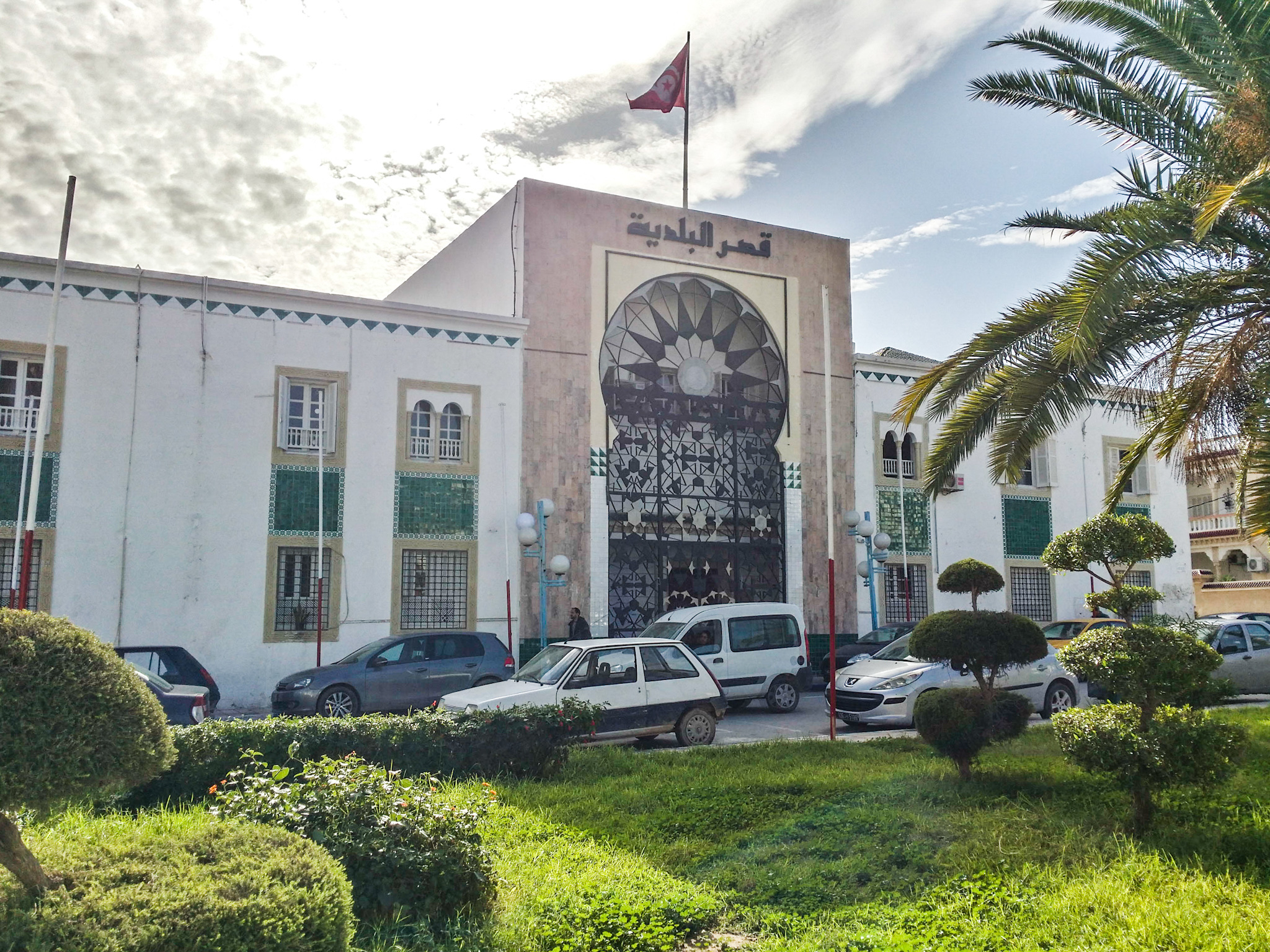
- View of the town hall of the city

- Location in Tunisia
- Coordinates: 35°51′32″N 10°35′38″E
- Country: Tunisia
- Governorate: Sousse Governorate
- Delegation(s): Hammam Sousse

Government
  - Mayor: Anis Jegham (Independent)

Population (2022)
  - Total: 47,520
- Time zone: UTC1 (CET)
- Postal code: 4011

Hammam Sousse (Tunisian Arabic: حمّام سوسة) is a coastal town in eastern Tunisia. It is located north of Sousse. It has about 42,691 inhabitants in 2014.

== Location ==
Hammam Sousse is located north of Sousse, at around 35°51′32″N 10°35′38″E.

== History ==
As in the other regions of the Sahel, the presence of humans in Hammam Sousse dates back to thousands of years. During the Carthage empire, the Phoenician counter of Hadrumète (current Sousse) was founded around the 10th century BC, which influenced the local economy and settling of farmers and hunters in the regions of Bilda and Kanta. After the fall of Carthage in 146 BC, the Roman rule began and extended until 429. During this period, the region of Hammam Sousse experienced a prosperous agriculture. Later the land was abandoned following the invasion of the Vandals.

Under the Arab dynasty of the Aghlabids in the 9th century, the core of the city was founded, which was built on the place known as El Ksar. The oldest construction of the Arab period is the marabout of Sidi Sahloul (built before the core of the current city).

The first map of the village was drawn in 1857 during the rule of the Husainid dynasty, where there are fourteen oil mills, four mills and 250 houses. In 1864, the Mthalith tribe attacked the village because of the taxes imposed by the Husseinites. In May 30, Hammam Sousse participated, with the 51 villages of the Sahel, in the resistance against the beylik army led by General Ahmed Zarrouk that forced them to pay the mejba. The revolt was crushed after the battle of Kalâa Kebira.

== Notable people ==
- Zine El Abidine Ben Ali (President of Tunisia between 1987 and 2011)
- Hédi Baccouche (Former prime minister)
- Kamel Morjane (Politician)
- Mohamed Jegham (Politician)
- Mokhtar Latiri (Engineer)
- Aymen Hacen (Poet)

== Population ==
2014 Census (Municipal)
Homes	Families	Males	Females	Total
18598	12516	21359	21332	42691
