= Lassaad Dridi =

Tunisian footballer (born 1977)

Personal information
- Date of birth: 19 April 1977 (age 49)
- Position: Defensive midfielder

Team information
- Current team: (manager)

Senior career*
Years	Team	Apps	(Gls)
2001–2005	Stade Tunisien		
2005–2008	CA Bizertin		
2008–2009	ES Hammam-Sousse		
2009–2010	CA Bizertin		
2010–2011	CS Sfaxien		
2011	→ Al-Hilal SC (loan)		
2011–2012	ES Hammam-Sousse		

Managerial career
- 2013: ES Hammam-Sousse
- 2013: Stade Tunisien (assistant)
- 2013–2014: Stade Tunisien
- 2014–2016: Stade Tunisien
- 2016: Stade Gabèsien
- 2017: CA Bizertin
- 2017–2018: CS Sfaxien
- 2018–2019: US Monastir
- 2019–2021: Club Africain
- 2021: Étoile du Sahel
- 2022: Olympique de Khouribga
- 2023-24: Al-Ahly
- 2024-25: CS Sfaxien
- 2025: ES Sahel
- 2025: Stade Tunisien
- 2025-2026: CS Constantine
- 2026: Nejmeh
- * Club domestic league appearances and goals

Lassaad Dridi (born 19 April 1977) is a Tunisian football manager and a former player.
