= AS Rejiche =

Tunisian football club

Avenir de Rejiche
- Full name: Avenir Sportif de Rejiche
- Founded: 1980; 46 years ago
- Ground: Stade municipal de Rejiche
- Capacity: 3,000
- Chairman: (Tunisia) Mohamed Ali Aroui
- Manager: (Tunisia) Slim Zouari
- League: Ligue Professionnelle 2
- 2023–24: TBD
Home colours	Away colours

Avenir Sportif de Rejiche is a Tunisian professional football club based in Rejiche, that competes in the Tunisian Ligue Professionnelle 1.

The club finished in first place of Group B of the 2019–20 Tunisian Ligue Professionnelle 2 season, earning promotion to the 2020–21 Tunisian Ligue Professionnelle 1.
