= List of football clubs in Tunisia =

The following is an incomplete list of association football clubs based in Tunisia. For a complete list see Category:Football clubs in Tunisia

== A ==
- AS Ariana
- AS Djerba
- AS Gabès
- AS Kasserine
- AS La Marsa
- AS Rejiche
- AS Soliman

== B ==
- ES Beni-Khalled

== C ==
- CA Bizertin
- Club Africain
- CO Transports
- CS Chebba
- CS Hammam-Lif
- CS Korba
- CS M'saken
- CS Makthar
- CS Sfaxien

== E ==
- El Ahly Mateur
- El Makarem de Mahdia
- EGS Gafsa
- Enfida Sports
- EO Sidi Bouzid
- ES Hammam-Sousse
- ES Metlaoui
- ES Radès
- ES Tunis
- ES Zarzis
- ES Jerba
- EO La Goulette et Kram
- ES Sahel

== F ==
- FC Hammamet

== G ==
- Grombalia Sports

== J ==
- Jendouba Sport
- JS Kairouan

== L ==
- LPST Tozeur

== M ==
- CO Médenine

== O ==
- Océano Club de Kerkennah
- Olympique Béja
- Olympique du Kef

== S ==
- Stade Tunisien
- SC Moknine
- Sfax Railways Sports
- Stade Africain Menzel Bourguiba
- Stade Gabèsien
- Stade Sportif Sfaxien
- Stir Sportive Zarzouna

== U ==
- US Sbeitla
- US Ben Guerdane
- US Monastir
- US Tataouine

== Women's football clubs ==
- AS Banque de l'Habitat
