= 2015–16 Tunisian Cup =

2015–16 Coupe de Tunisie
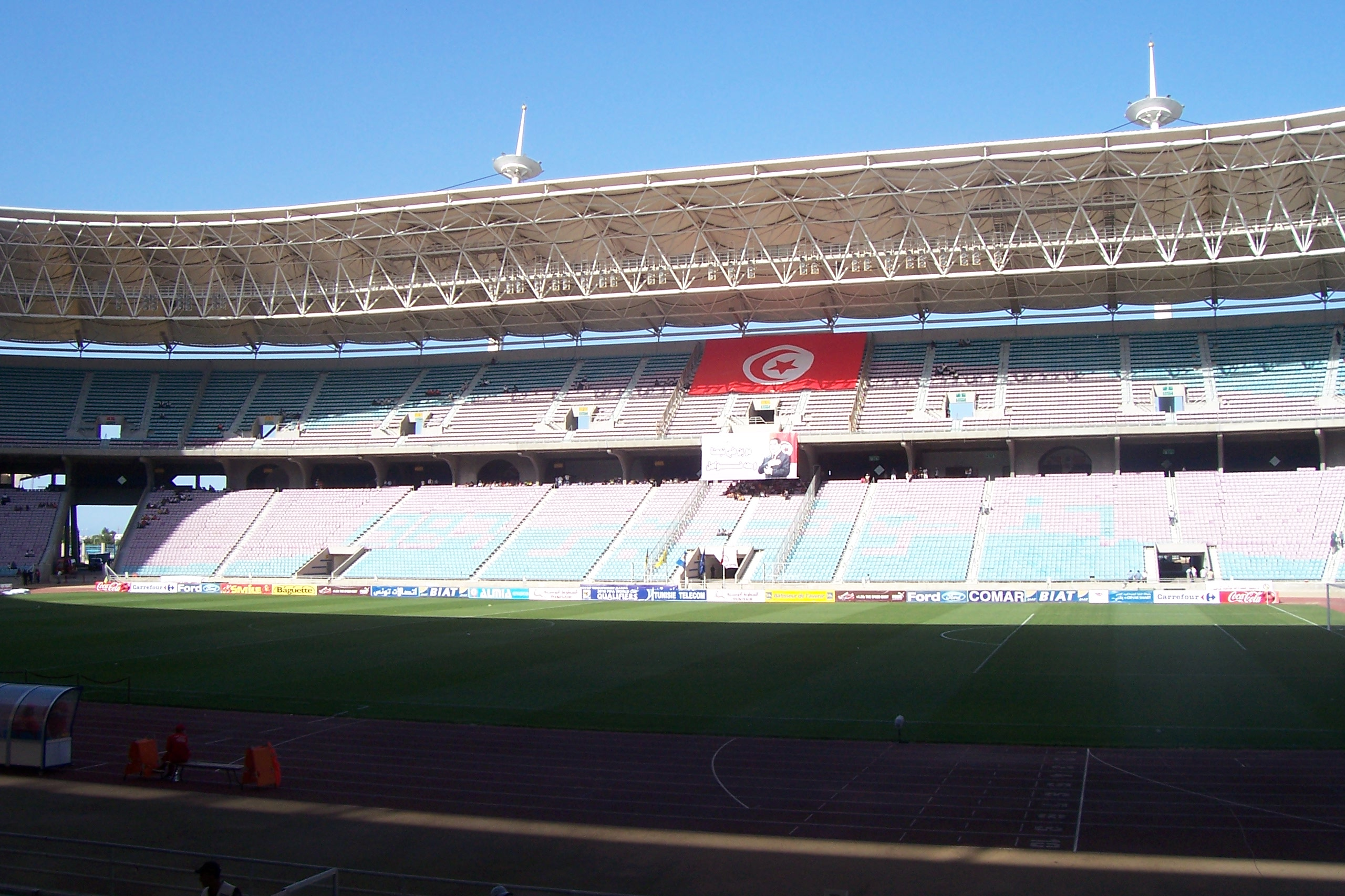
- Stade Olympique de Radès hosted the final

Tournament details
- Country: Tunisia

Final positions
- Champions: Espérance de Tunis (15th title)
- Runners-up: Club Africain

The 2015–16 Tunisian Cup (Coupe de Tunisie) was the 84th season of the football cup competition of Tunisia. The competition was organized by the Fédération Tunisienne de Football (FTF) and open to all clubs in Tunisia.
Ligue 1 teams entered the competition in the Round of 32.

== First round ==
=== Ligue 2 games ===
Only Ligue 2 teams compete in this round.

28 November 2015	Club de Korba	3–0	Union de Sbeitla	Stade Municipal de Korba, Korba

28 November 2015	El Makarem de Mahdia	0–0 (a.e.t.) (6–5 p)	Espoir de Hammam Sousse	Stade Rached Khouja, Mahdia

28 November 2015	Stir Zarzouna	0–0 (a.e.t.) (3–1 p)	Union Monastirienne

28 November 2015	Association d'Ariana	1–3	Union de Siliana

28 November 2015	Sporting Ben Arous	0–1	Association de Djerba

28 November 2015	FC Hammamet	2–0	Grombalia Sports

28 November 2015	Stade Sfaxien	0–1	Olympique Béja

28 November 2015	Union de Tataouine	0–0 (a.e.t.) (1–3 p)	Croissant de M'saken

28 November 2015	Olympique du Kef	1–1 (a.e.t.) (3–4 p)	Sfax Railways Sports	Stade du Kef, El Kef

== Second round ==
Only Ligue 2 and Ligue 3 teams compete in this round.

19 December 2015	Étoile du Fahs	2–1	Olympique Ghorghar

19 December 2015	Aigle de Jelma	0–0 (a.e.t.) (6–7 p)	Stir Zarzouna

19 December 2015	Club de Jebiniana	0–1	Sfax Railways Sports

19 December 2015	Étoile de Radès	2–0	El Makarem de Mahdia

20 December 2015	Envoi de Regueb	2–1	ES Lajmi

20 December 2015	Kalâa Sport	5–3	Espoir de Bouficha

20 December 2015	Club de Korba	2–3	Al Ahly Hajri

20 December 2015	Croissant de M'saken	4–3	Avenir de Mohamedia

20 December 2015	Jendouba Sport	1–0	Vague de Menzel Abderrahmane

20 December 2015	Flèche de Ksar Gafsa	2–0	Stade Africain Menzel Bourguiba

20 December 2015	Avenir de Barnoussa	1–2	Union de Siliana

20 December 2015	Olympique Béja	2–0	Association de Djerba

20 December 2015	Avenir d'Oued Ellil	2–0	Union de Métouia

20 December 2015	Union de Ksour Essef	0–0 (a.e.t.) (7–6 p)	Palme de Tozeur

20 December 2015	FC Hammamet	5–1	Étoile de Béni Khalled

20 December 2015	BS Bannène	awarded*	Croissant Chebbien

*The game didn't take place because it was supposed to be played behind closed doors but BS Bannène fans did assist, which led the referee to decide not to start the match. The FTF awarded the victory to CS Chebba.

== Round of 32 ==
The draw also determined the games of the Round of 16 and those of the quarter-finals.

30 January 2016	Croissant de M'saken	2–0	Avenir d'Oued Ellil
13:30	Houcem Abouda 67'; Othmene Saidi 90+4'

30 January 2016	Club Africain	2–1	Union de Ben Guerdane
13:30	Ifa 45'; Khalifa 80'		90' (pen.) Jacob

30 January 2016	Étoile de Radès	2–2 (a.e.t.) (5–6 p)	Jeunesse Kairouanaise
13:30	Mohamed Ben Azzouz 79'; Nacer Ben Kaab 94'		22' Rabii Nabli; 108' Mohamed Ali Raggoubi
	Penalties
	Hamraoui (penalty scored); Ben Azzouz (penalty missed); Makhzoumi (penalty scored); Ben Amor (penalty scored); Ben Salem (penalty scored); Ben Taieb (penalty scored); Karchoud (penalty missed)		(penalty missed) Zakkar; (penalty scored) Raggoubi; (penalty scored) Methnani; (penalty scored) Hlali; (penalty scored) Laamari; (penalty scored) Hamada; (penalty scored) Montega

30 January 2016	Étoile du Sahel	4–2	FC Hammamet
13:30	Msakni 15', 37'; Jemal 41' (pen.); Brigui 59'		17', 47' Ali Salah

30 January 2016	Olympique Béja	0–0 (a.e.t.) (4–1 p)	Stade Tunisien
13:30
	Penalties
	Jallabi (penalty scored); Kouki (penalty scored); Touati (penalty scored); Hamada (penalty scored)		(penalty missed) Landolsi (penalty missed); (penalty scored) Bouzaiene

30 January 2016	Flèche de Ksar Gafsa	1–0	Club de Hammam-Lif
13:30	Anis Troudi 46'

30 January 2016	Union de Ksour Essef	0–4	Espérance de Tunis
13:30			26' (pen.) Elyes Jelassi; 50' Haythem Jouini; 64' Mohamed Ali Yacoubi; 85' Idriss Mhirsi

30 January 2016	Club Sfaxien	0–1	Avenir de Marsa
13:30			82' Lassaad Jaziri

30 January 2016	Étoile du Fahs	1–0	El Gawafel de Gafsa
13:30	Tarek Chihi 40'

30 January 2016	Club Bizertin	3–0	Union de Siliana
13:30	Mortadha Ben Ouannes 50' (pen.); Alassane Sow 75'; Youssef Trabelsi 77'

30 January 2016	Kalâa Sport	2–0	Sfax Railways Sports
13:30	Ayoub Chamkhi 48'; Karim Baccar 60'

30 January 2016	Stir Zarzouna	3–1	Al Ahly Hajri
13:30	Youssef Irathni 37' (pen.); Ahmed Bargaoui 83'; Mehdi Chahbi 85'		17' Seif Ibrahim

30 January 2016	Stade Gabèsien	1–0	Espérance de Zarzis
13:30	Wajdi Mejdi 36'

30 January 2016	Croissant Chebbien	2–0	Jendouba Sport
13:30	Riadh Mhedhbi 11', 32'

30 January 2016	Envoi de Regueb	0–3	Olympique Sidi Bouzid
13:30

Étoile de Métlaoui got a bye and qualified to the Round of 16.

== Round of 16 ==
6 February 2016	Croissant de M'saken	0–2	Club Africain
13:30			26' Chenihi; 51' Meniaoui

7 February 2016	Étoile de Métlaoui	2–1	Jeunesse Kairouanaise
13:30	Zied Baccouche 2' (pen.); Thierry Ernest 29'		38' Ali Korbi

7 February 2016	Étoile du Sahel	4–1	Olympique Béja
13:30	Akaïchi 19', 58'; Dramé Michailou 70'; Hamza Lahmar 81' (pen.)		72' Oussema Amdouni

7 February 2016	Flèche de Ksar Gafsa	0–5	Espérance de Tunis
13:30			30', 45' Heythem Jouini; 72' Idriss Mhirsi; 80' (pen.) Taha Yacine Khnissi; 90+2' Iheb Mbarki

7 February 2016	Étoile du Fahs	0–3	Avenir de Marsa
13:30			33', 41' Bilel Ben Messaoud; 90+1' Firas Belarbi

7 February 2016	Kalâa Sport	0–0 (a.e.t.) (4–3 p)	Club Bizertin
13:30
	Penalties
	Maher Beldi (penalty missed); Mohamed Ali Barrouba (penalty scored); Badreddine Handouli (penalty scored); Radhouene Sfaxi (penalty scored); Ayoub Chamkhi (penalty scored)		(penalty scored) Mortadha Ben Ouannès; (penalty missed) Mohamed Hbib Yaken; (penalty scored) Habib Meité; (penalty scored) Seifallah Hosni; (penalty missed) Youssef Trabelsi

5 February 2016	Stir Zarzouna	1–3	Stade Gabèsien
13:30	Chahir Toumi 23'		1', 67', 87' Wajdi Mejri

6 February 2016	Croissant Chebbien	1–2	Olympique Sidi Bouzid
13:30	Hani Belaiba 64'		59' (pen.) Naoufel Yousfi; 74' Youssef Khmiri

== Quarter-finals ==
The games were played on 16 August 2016.

16 August 2016	Club Africain	2–0	Étoile de Métlaoui
19:00	Khalifa 62'; Ben Yahia 74'

16 August 2016	Étoile du Sahel	0–1	Espérance de Tunis
17:00			63' Khenissi

16 August 2016	Kalâa Sport	0–4	Avenir de Marsa
16:00			15', 40' Khaled Yahia; 25' (o.g.) Radhouene Sfaxi; 33' Mohamed Amine Aouichaoui

16 August 2016	Stade Gabèsien	W.O.	Olympique Sidi Bouzid
16:00

== Semi-finals ==
The games were played on 20 August.

20 August 2016	Stade Gabèsien	1–2	Espérance de Tunis
15:45	Essifi 19' (pen.)		57', 69' (pen.) Khenissi

20 August 2016	Avenir de Marsa	1–1 (a.e.t.) (5–6 p)	Club Africain
15:45	Maher Laabidi 43'		90' Ifa
	Penalties
	Hnid (penalty missed); Aouichi (penalty scored); Baha (penalty scored); Laabidi (penalty scored); Ben Messaoud (penalty scored); Diakité (penalty scored); Talla (penalty missed); Kozdoghli (penalty missed)		(penalty scored) Oueslati; (penalty scored) Meniaoui; (penalty scored) Ifa; (penalty scored) Chenihi; (penalty missed) Khalifa; (penalty scored) Haddadi; (penalty missed) Khalil; (penalty scored) F. Jaziri

== Final ==
27 August 2016	Club Africain	0–2	Espérance de Tunis	Stade Olympique de Radès, Tunis
17:00			50' Khenissi; 54' Rjaïbi	Referee: Haythem Guirat

== See also ==
- 2015–16 Tunisian Ligue Professionnelle 1
- 2015–16 Tunisian Ligue Professionnelle 2
- 2015–16 Tunisian Ligue Professionnelle 3
