= 2016–17 Tunisian Cup =

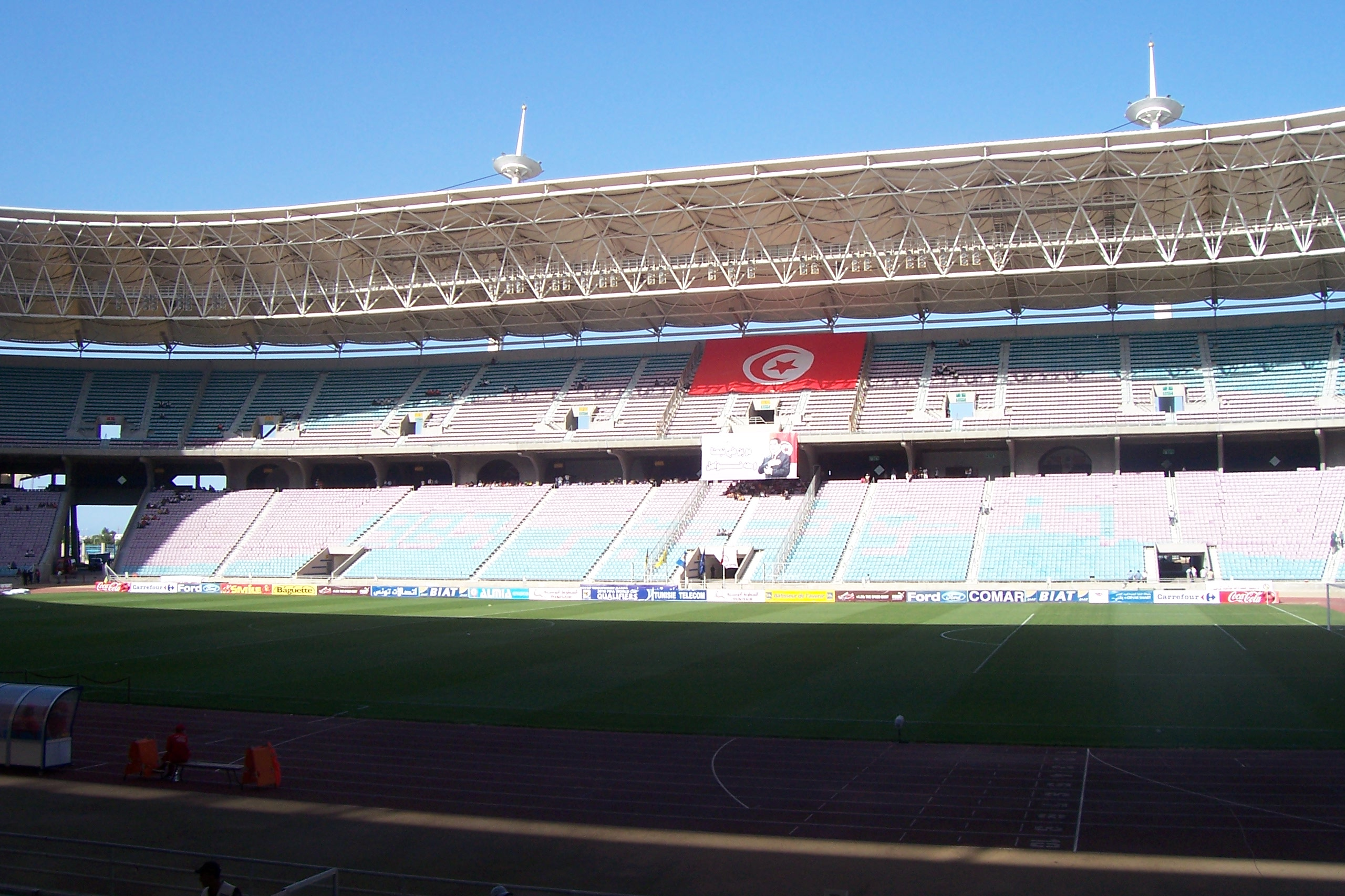
- Stade Olympique de Radès hosted the final

Tournament details
- Country: Tunisia

Final positions
- Champions: Club Africain (12th title)
- Runner-up: Union de Ben Guerdane

The 2016–17 Tunisian Cup (Coupe de Tunisie) was the 85th season of the football cup competition of Tunisia. The competition was organized by the Fédération Tunisienne de Football (FTF) and open to all clubs in Tunisia.

== First round ==
=== Ligue 2 games ===
Only Ligue 2 teams competed in this round.

29 October 2016	Union de Siliana	0–2	Association de Djerba
14:30

30 October 2016	El Gawafel de Gafsa	2–0	Olympique du Kef
14:30

30 October 2016	Espoir de Hammam Sousse	0–1	Stade Sfaxien
14:30

30 October 2016	Grombalia Sports	1–0	Stade Tunisien
14:30

30 October 2016	Association d'Ariana	1–2 (a.e.t.)	Stade Africain Menzel Bourguiba
14:30

30 October 2016	Croissant de M'saken	1–0	Olympique Médenine
14:30

30 October 2016	Stade Nabeulien	1–1 (a.e.t.) (3–5 p)	Sporting Ben Arous
14:30

30 October 2016	Union Monastirienne	0–1	FC Hammamet
14:30

30 October 2016	Club de Korba	3–1	Jendouba Sport
14:30

30 October 2016	Sfax Railway Sports	3–1	Avenir de Kasserine
14:30

== Round of 32 ==
30 November 2016	Association de Djerba	1–0	Olympique Béja
13:30	Ghrab 32'

30 November 2016	Sporting Moknine	0–1	FC Hammamet
13:30			85' Bouhajeb

30 November 2016	Club de Bembla	0–5	Club Africain
13:30			25' Chenihi; 35' Srarfi; 47' Chenihi; 72' Belkhiter; 83' Benothmane

30 November 2016	Aigle de Jelma	1–2	Croissant de M'saken
13:30			84' Nasri

30 November 2016	Avenir de Marsa	3–0	Sfax Railway Sports
13:30	Jaziri 20'; Talla 45'; Yahia 87'

30 November 2016	Union de Métouia	0–1	Union de Tataouine
13:30			61' Harzalli

30 November 2016	Wydad Sers	2–1	Progès de Sakiet Eddaier
13:30	Khalfaoui 37' (pen.); Abidi 73'

30 November 2016	Espérance de Zarzis	3–1 (a.e.t.)	Avenir de Gabès
13:30	Attia 69' (pen.); Adala 104'; Darragi 117' (o.g.)		45' (pen.) Kacem

30 November 2016	Union de Sidi Bou Ali	2–7	Union de Ben Guerdane
13:30	Ben Dhiaf 60', 87'		13' Ben Sassi; 32', 57' Khfifi; 67' Arfaoui; 68' Samti; 80' (pen.) Tbargui; 81' (pen.) Mansour

30 November 2016	Al Ahly Hajri	0–1	Stade Gabèsien
13:30			2' Essifi

30 November 2016	El Gawafel de Gafsa	0–1	Jeunesse Kairouanaise
13:30			41' Ben Romdhane

30 November 2016	Espoir de Haffouz	0–1	ES Métlaoui
13:30			81' Ben Hammouda

30 November 2016	CS Sfaxien	2–2 (a.e.t.) (3–5 p)	Club de Hammam-Lif
13:30	Hannachi 57'; Marzouki 92'		60' Omar Zekri; 67' Chiheb Zoghlami
	Penalties
	Meriah (penalty scored); Hannachi (penalty missed); Sokari (penalty scored); Belaid (penalty scored)		(penalty scored) Kanzari; (penalty scored) Seghaier; (penalty scored) Bousnina; (penalty scored) Laadhibi; (penalty scored) Aissaoui

30 November 2016	Badr El Ain	0–4	Espérance de Tunis
13:30			5', 25' Mejri; 58' Rjaïbi; 80' Jelassi

30 November 2016	Sporting Ben Arous	0–2 (a.e.t.)	Club Bizertin
13:30			112' Hosni; 118' Ben Choug

Étoile du Sahel got a bye and qualified to the Round of 16.

== Round of 16 ==
14 December 2016	Avenir de Marsa	1–1 (a.e.t.) (3–4 p)	Union de Ben Guerdane
13:30	Ghbarou 79'		88' Mida
	Penalties
	Jaziri (penalty missed); Laabidi (penalty scored); Baha (penalty scored); Khalfi (penalty scored); Yahia (penalty missed); Hedhiri (penalty missed)		(penalty scored) Jacob; (penalty missed) Ben Salem; (penalty scored) Abbès; (penalty scored) Samti; (penalty missed) Ben Sassi; (penalty scored) Khfifi

14 December 2016	Stade Gabèsien	2–1 (a.e.t.)	Étoile de Métlaoui
13:30	Hosni 23'; Abbès 96' (pen.)		91' Ben Hammouda

14 December 2016	Jeunesse Kairouanaise	0–4	Étoile du Sahel
13:30			12', 48' Acosta; 15' Dhaouadi; 84' Bangoura

14 December 2016	Club de Hammam-Lif	2–0 (a.e.t.)	Association de Djerba
13:30	Zekri 109'; Ziadi 118'

14 December 2016	Club Bizertin	1–0	Union de Tataouine
13:30	Hamdouni 16'

14 December 2016	Croissant de M'saken	1–3	Club Africain
13:30	Chatti 86'		46' (o.g.) Atig; 61' Chenihi; 73' Benothmane

14 December 2016	FC Hammamet	2–3	Espérance de Tunis
13:30	Naili 44'; Salah 72'		49' (pen.) Khenissi; 58' Bguir; 76' Badri

14 December 2016	Wydad Sers	1–3	Espérance de Zarzis
13:30	Abidi 85'		41' Fall; 60' Messaadi; 90' Ben Belgacem

== Quarter-finals ==
19 February 2017	Club Bizertin	0–0 (a.e.t.) (1–2 p)	Club Africain
13:30
	Penalties
	Messaadi (penalty missed); Besghayer (penalty missed); Hbib Yaken (penalty scored); Hosni (penalty missed); Saidani (penalty missed)		(penalty missed) Ayadi; (penalty scored) Ifa; (penalty scored) Rusike; (penalty missed) Belkhiter

19 February 2017	Union de Ben Guerdane	1–0	Stade Gabèsien
13:30	Samti 66' (pen.)

19 February 2017	Club de Hammam-Lif	0–0 (a.e.t.) (5–4 p)	Étoile du Sahel
13:30
	Penalties
	Zoghlemi (penalty scored); Laadhibi (penalty scored); Ziadi (penalty scored); Berrajah (penalty scored); Bousnina (penalty scored)		(penalty scored) Lahmar; (penalty scored) Bouazza; (penalty scored) Ben Amor; (penalty missed) Diogo; (penalty scored) Jemal

19 February 2017	Espérance de Tunis	2–0	Espérance de Zarzis
16:30	Dhaouadi 63'; Bguir 81'

== Semi-finals ==
27 May 2017	Club de Hammam-Lif	0–3	Club Africain
15:30			2' Darragi; 17' (pen.) Khalifa; 89' Ben Yahia

28 May 2017	Union de Ben Guerdane	0–0 (a.e.t.) (5–4 p)	Espérance de Tunis
15:30
	Penalties
	Jacob (penalty scored); Abbes (penalty scored); Coulibaly (penalty scored); Harbaoui (penalty scored); Abdessalem (penalty scored)		(penalty missed) Khenissi; (penalty scored) Sassi; (penalty scored) Ben Youssef; (penalty scored) Chaalali; (penalty scored) Chemmam

== Final ==
17 June 2017	Club Africain	1–0	Union de Ben Guerdane	Stade Olympique de Radès, Tunis
15:30	Khalifa 2'			Referee: Sadok Selmi

== See also ==
- 2016–17 Tunisian Ligue Professionnelle 1
- 2016–17 Tunisian Ligue Professionnelle 2
- 2016–17 Tunisian Ligue Professionnelle 3
