= 2015–16 Tunisian Ligue Professionnelle 2 =

Tunisian Ligue Professionnelle 2
- Season: 2015–16
- Promoted: AS Gabès; Olympique Béja; US Tataouine
- Relegated: US Sbeitla; El Makarem de Mahdia; Stir Sportive Zarzouna
- Matches played: 211
- Goals scored: 468 (2.22 per match)
- Biggest home win: ASG 4–0 OB; OB 4–0SRS
- Biggest away win: EMM 1–5 CSM
- Highest scoring: USM 5–2 OK; SSS 5–2 USSB

The 2015–16 Tunisian Ligue Professionnelle 2 (Tunisian Professional League) season was the 61st season since Tunisia's independence.

== Teams ==
Locations of the 2015–16 Ligue 2 teams
Group A
Group B

The 20 teams will be drawn into two groups of 10 teams each. The first three of each group will qualify to the promotion playoff, while the last of each group will be relegated to Ligue 3. The two teams that finish the regular season in the 9th position will play a relegation playoff, a single match to determine who is maintained in Ligue 2 and who is relegated to Ligue 3. US Monastir, AS Gabès and AS Djerba were the three relegated teams at the end of the 2014-15 Ligue 1 season. On the other hand, STIR Zarzouna, US Siliana and US Tataouine were the three promoted teams at the end of the 2014–15 Ligue 3 season.

=== Group A ===
- AS Djerba
- CS Korba
- FC Hammamet
- Grombalia Sports
- Jendouba Sport
- Olympique du Kef
- Stade Sportif Sfaxien
- Stir Sportive Zarzouna
- US Monastir
- Union Sportive Sbeitla

=== Group B ===
- AS Ariana
- AS Gabès
- CS M'saken
- El Makarem de Mahdia
- ES Hammam-Sousse
- Olympique Béja
- Sfax Railway Sports
- Sporting Ben Arous
- US Siliana
- US Tataouine

== Results ==
=== Group A ===
==== Group A table ====
Pos	Team	Pld	W	D	L	GF	GA	GD	Pts	Qualification or relegation
1	US Monastir	18	11	1	6	31	20	+11	34	Qualification for Promotion Playoffs
2	FC Hammamet	18	9	6	3	22	13	+9	33	Qualification for Promotion Playoffs
3	Jendouba Sport	18	8	7	3	25	16	+9	31	Qualification for Promotion Playoffs
4	Grombalia Sports	18	8	6	4	23	16	+7	30	
5	Stade Sportif Sfaxien	18	6	4	8	20	22	−2	22	
6	CS Korba	18	5	7	6	16	18	−2	22	
7	Olympique du Kef	18	5	5	8	20	28	−8	20	
8	AS Djerba	18	4	6	8	16	23	−7	18 (Note: AS Djerba ahead on head-to-head record: AS Djerba 1–0 Stir Sportive Zarzouna, Stir Sportive Zarzouna 1–1 AS Djerba)	
9	Stir Sportive Zarzouna	18	4	6	8	14	20	−6	18	Qualification for Relegation Playoff
10	US Sbeitla	18	4	4	10	20	31	−11	16	Relegation to Tunisian Ligue Professionnelle 3

Updated to match(es) played on 30 March 2016. Source: LIGUE 2 Group A
Rules for classification: 1) points; 2) goal difference; 3) number of goals scored.

==== Group A result table ====
Home \ Away	ASD	CSK	FCH	GS	JS	OK	SSS	SSZ	USM	USSB
AS Djerba	—	1–3	1–1	1–1	0–0	3–0	1–0	1–0	0–1	1–1
CS Korba	2–2	—	1–1	1–1	0–2	2–1	1–1	1–0	0–1	0–1
FC Hammamet	2–0	0–0	—	0–3	2–2	3–0	2–0	1–0	1–2	1–0
Grombalia Sports	2–0	1–0	0–1	—	2–1	0–0	2–0	0–0	3–1	1–1
Jendouba Sport	1–0	0–0	0–0	3–1	—	2–1	2–1	2–0	2–0	2–1
Olympique du Kef	2–1	0–1	1–1	3–2	1–1	—	1–0	1–1	2–1	3–1
Stade Sportif Sfaxien	0–2	1–1	2–1	2–0	1–0	1–1	—	1–0	0–2	5–2
Stir Sportive Zarzouna	1–1	3–1	0–1	1–2	2–2	1–0	1–1	—	2–1	1–0
US Monastir	3–0	0–1	0–2	1–1	2–1	5–2	3–1	3–0	—	2–1
US Sbeitla	3–1	2–1	1–2	0–1	2–2	2–1	0–3	1–1	1–3	—

Updated to match(es) played on 30 March 2016. Source: Ligue 2 Group A
Legend: Blue = home team win; Yellow = draw; Red = away team win.

=== Group B ===
==== Group B table ====
Pos	Team	Pld	W	D	L	GF	GA	GD	Pts	Qualification or relegation
1	Olympique Béja	18	8	6	4	25	18	+7	30	Qualification for Promotion Playoffs
2	US Tataouine	18	7	8	3	20	14	+6	29	Qualification for Promotion Playoffs
3	AS Gabès	18	6	9	3	21	13	+8	27	Qualification for Promotion Playoffs
4	CS M'saken	18	5	9	4	19	15	+4	24	
5	Sporting Ben Arous	18	5	8	5	17	17	0	23	
6	AS Ariana	18	6	5	7	23	24	−1	23	
7	ES Hammam-Sousse	18	5	7	6	16	16	0	22	
8	US Siliana	18	5	7	6	17	18	−1	22	
9	Sfax Railways Sports	18	5	4	9	15	27	−12	19	Qualification for Relegation Playoff
10	El Makarem de Mahdia	18	3	7	8	18	29	−11	16	Relegation to Tunisian Ligue Professionnelle 3

Updated to match(es) played on 30 March 2016. Source: LIGUE 2 Group B
Rules for classification: 1) points; 2) goal difference; 3) number of goals scored.

==== Group B result table ====
Home \ Away	ASA	ASG	CSM	EMM	ESHS	OB	SRS	SBA	USS	UST
AS Ariana	—	1–0	1–1	2–0	3–2	2–3	1–1	2–0	3–0	1–1
AS Gabès	2–1	—	1–1	1–1	1–0	4–0	3–0	1–1	0–0	2–2
CS M'saken	0–0	0–1	—	2–1	0–2	0–0	1–1	2–2	2–0	1–1
El Makarem de Mahdia	2–2	1–1	1–5	—	1–1	2–3	2–0	0–0	1–1	1–1
ES Hammam-Sousse	2–1	1–1	1–0	3–0	—	0–0	2–1	1–1	0–0	0–1
Olympique Béja	0–1	2–2	0–1	3–1	2–0	—	4–0	3–2	1–1	1–0
Sfax Railways Sports	2–1	1–0	1–2	1–2	1–0	1–1	—	1–1	2–1	1–0
Sporting Ben Arous	3–0	1–0	0–0	0–2 (Note: Awarded 0–2 (in both matches) because SC Ben Arous fielded an ineligible player against EM Mahdia and Olympique Béja. The original score was 2–1 in both matches.)	0–0	0–2	2–1	—	1–0	2–0
US Siliana	4–1	0–1	1–1	1–0	2–0	1–0	2–0	0–0	—	1–1
US Tataouine	1–0	0–0	1–0	2–0	1–1	0–0	2–0	2–1	4–2	—

Updated to match(es) played on 30 March 2016. Source: Ligue 2 Group B
Legend: Blue = home team win; Yellow = draw; Red = away team win.

== Playoffs ==
=== Promotion Playoffs ===
==== Promotion Playoffs table ====
Pos	Team	Pld	W	D	L	GF	GA	GD	Pts	Promotion
1	AS Gabès	10	5	3	2	13	7	+6	18	Promotion to 2016–17 Ligue 1
2	US Tataouine	10	5	1	4	10	12	−2	16 (Note: In the games between these three teams, US Tataouine got 7 points, Olympique Béja 5 and FC Hammamet 3. See the Result table below for more details.)	Promotion to 2016–17 Ligue 1
3	Olympique Béja	10	4	4	2	15	11	+4	16	Promotion to 2016–17 Ligue 1
4	FC Hammamet	10	4	4	2	12	10	+2	16	
5	US Monastir	10	3	2	5	9	12	−3	11	
6	Jendouba Sport	10	2	0	8	8	15	−7	6	

Updated to match(es) played on 3 June 2016. Source: Ligue 2 Promotion Playoffs
Rules for classification: 1) points; 2) goal difference; 3) number of goals scored.

==== Promotion Playoffs result table ====
Home \ Away	ASG	FCH	JS	OB	USM	UST
AS Gabès	—	2–2	1–0	2–0	0–0	2–0
FC Hammamet	1–0	—	1–0	3–3	1–0	0–0
Jendouba Sport	0–1	3–2	—	0–1	0–2	4–1
Olympique Béja	2–2	0–0	3–0	—	2–0	1–2
US Monastir	2–1	1–2	1–0	2–2	—	1–3
US Tataouine	0–2 (Note: The game was stopped shortly after the beginning of the second half when the score was 1–1 due to the US Tataouine fan number that was more than what the Tunisian Football Federation allowed.)	1–0	2–1	0–1	1–0	—

Updated to match(es) played on 3 June 2016. Source: Ligue 2 Promotion Playoffs
Legend: Blue = home team win; Yellow = draw; Red = away team win.

=== Relegation playoff ===
16 April 2016
14:00

Sfax Railways Sports	2–1	Stir Sportive Zarzouna
Chedy Amri 37'; Chamseddine Dhifallah 88'		58' Mohamed Ali Jomaa

Stade de Korba, Korba

==== Relegated teams ====
- US Sbeitla on 30 March 2016 (Week 18 out of 18)
- El Makarem de Mahdia on 30 March 2016 (Week 18 out of 18)
- Stir Sportive Zarzouna on 16 April 2016 (relegation playoff)

== See also ==
- 2015–16 Tunisian Ligue Professionnelle 1
- 2015–16 Tunisian Ligue Professionnelle 3
- 2015–16 Tunisian Cup
