= 2016–17 Tunisian Ligue Professionnelle 2 =

Tunisian Ligue Professionnelle 2
- Season: 2016–17
- Promoted: US Monastir; Stade Tunisien; CO Médenine
- Relegated: FC Hammamet; CS M'saken; Grombalia Sports; Olympique du Kef; Stade Nabeulien; US Siliana
- Matches: 210
- Goals: 448 (2.13 per match)
- Biggest home win: EGSG 6–0 OK
- Biggest away win: SBA 1–4 USM
- Highest scoring: EGSG 6–0 OK; USM 3–3 ESHS

The 2016–17 Tunisian Ligue Professionnelle 2 (Tunisian Professional League) season was the 62nd season since Tunisia's independence.

== Teams ==
Locations of the 2016–17 Ligue 2 teams
Group A
Group B

=== Group A ===
- AS Kasserine
- CS Korba
- EGS Gafsa
- ES Hammam-Sousse
- FC Hammamet
- Olympique du Kef
- Sporting Ben Arous
- Stade Africain Menzel Bourguiba
- US Monastir
- US Siliana

=== Group B ===
- AS Ariana
- AS Djerba
- CO Médenine
- CS M'saken
- Grombalia Sports
- Jendouba Sport
- Sfax Railway Sports
- Stade Nabeulien
- Stade Sportif Sfaxien
- Stade Tunisien

== Results ==
=== Group A ===
==== Group A table ====
Pos	Team	Pld	W	D	L	GF	GA	GD	Pts	Qualification or relegation
1	US Monastir	18	10	6	2	27	11	+16	36	Qualification for Promotion Group
2	Stade Africain Menzel Bourguiba	18	8	6	4	21	11	+10	30	Qualification for Promotion Group
3	Sporting Ben Arous	18	8	4	6	18	20	−2	28	Qualification for Promotion Group
4	EGS Gafsa	18	6	6	6	22	11	+11	24	
5	AS Kasserine	18	6	6	6	15	19	−4	24	
6	CS Korba	18	5	8	5	19	20	−1	23	
7	ES Hammam-Sousse	18	6	5	7	16	17	−1	23	
8	FC Hammamet	18	6	4	8	16	18	−2	22	Relegation to Tunisian Ligue Professionnelle 3
9	Olympique du Kef	18	5	5	8	13	21	−8	20	Relegation to Tunisian Ligue Professionnelle 3
10	US Siliana	18	3	4	11	8	27	−19	12 (Note: US Siliana was docked 1 point for refusing to play against Olympique du Kef.)	Relegation to Tunisian Ligue Professionnelle 3

Updated to match(es) played on 5 March 2017. Source: Ligue 2 Group A
Rules for classification: 1) points; 2) goal difference; 3) number of goals scored.

==== Group A result table ====
Home \ Away	ASK	CSK	EGSG	ESHS	FCH	OK	SBA	SAMB	USM	USS
AS Kasserine	—	1–1	2–1	0–0	2–1	1–1	1–2	1–0	0–3	0–1
CS Korba	1–1	—	1–0	2–1	3–1	3–2	0–0	2–2	1–2	1–0
EGS Gafsa	1–1	1–1	—	3–0	1–0	6–0	4–0	2–0	0–2	3–0
ES Hammam-Sousse	0–1	3–1	0–0	—	1–0	3–1	0–1	1–0	0–0	2–0
FC Hammamet	2–0	0–0	0–0	1–0	—	2–0	1–0	0–1	1–1	3–1
Olympique du Kef	1–0	0–0	1–0	1–1	0–1	—	3–1	1–0	0–1	2–0 (Note: Awarded 2–0 because US Siliana didn't turn up.)
Sporting Ben Arous	1–2	2–1	2–0	1–0	2–1	0–0	—	0–0	2–1	3–2
Stade Africain Menzel Bourguiba	1–1	2–0	0–0	2–0	4–1	1–0	2–0	—	2–1	3–0
US Monastir	2–0	1–0	1–0	3–3	1–1	1–0	1–1	0–0	—	2–0
US Siliana	0–1	1–1	0–0	0–1	1–0	0–0	1–0	1–1	0–4	—

Updated to match(es) played on 5 March 2017. Source: Ligue 2 Group A
Legend: Blue = home team win; Yellow = draw; Red = away team win.

=== Group B ===
==== Group B table ====
Pos	Team	Pld	W	D	L	GF	GA	GD	Pts	Qualification or relegation
1	AS Djerba	18	9	5	4	18	10	+8	32	Qualification for Promotion Group
2	Stade Tunisien	18	8	7	3	18	10	+8	31	Qualification for Promotion Group
3	CO Médenine	18	6	8	4	17	12	+5	26	Qualification for Promotion Group
4	Stade Sportif Sfaxien	18	7	5	6	20	21	−1	26	
5	Jendouba Sport	18	7	2	9	21	22	−1	23	
6	Sfax Railway Sports	18	7	2	9	18	20	−2	23	
7	AS Ariana	18	5	7	6	27	28	−1	22	
8	CS M'saken	18	5	7	6	21	24	−3	22	Relegation to Tunisian Ligue Professionnelle 3
9	Grombalia Sports	18	5	5	8	13	19	−6	20	Relegation to Tunisian Ligue Professionnelle 3
10	Stade Nabeulien	18	5	4	9	16	23	−7	19	Relegation to Tunisian Ligue Professionnelle 3

Updated to match(es) played on 5 March 2017. Source: Ligue 2 Group B
Rules for classification: 1) points; 2) goal difference; 3) number of goals scored.

==== Group B result table ====
Home \ Away	ASA	ASD	COM	CSM	GS	JS	SRS	SN	SSS	ST
AS Ariana	—	0–2	0–0	4–3	3–1	2–1	2–2	2–1	2–2	2–2
AS Djerba	1–0	—	1–1	1–0	0–0	1–0	2–1	1–1	0–1	0–0
CO Médenine	1–1	1–0	—	1–1	2–0	1–0	1–0	2–0	2–0	1–1
CS M'saken	1–1	0–1	2–1	—	2–1	3–2	0–0	0–0	0–0	2–1
Grombalia Sports	1–2	1–0	0–0	2–3	—	1–1	1–0	1–0	1–0	1–0
Jendouba Sport	2–1	1–3	1–1	3–1	2–0	—	2–0	2–1	1–0	1–0
Sfax Railway Sports	2–1	1–2	1–0	2–0	2–1	2–0	—	2–1	2–1	0–1
Stade Nabeulien	2–1	1–0	1–1	2–1	1–1	2–1	2–1	—	0–2	0–2
Stade Sportif Sfaxien	1–1	1–3	2–1	2–2	1–0	2–1	2–0	2–1	—	1–1
Stade Tunisien	3–2	0–0	1–0	0–0	0–0	1–0	1–0	1–0	3–0	—

Updated to match(es) played on 5 March 2017. Source: Ligue 2 Group B
Legend: Blue = home team win; Yellow = draw; Red = away team win.

== Playoffs ==
=== Promotion Playoffs ===
==== Promotion Playoffs table ====
Pos	Team	Pld	W	D	L	GF	GA	GD	Pts	Promotion or qualification
1	Stade Tunisien	10	8	0	2	15	3	+12	24	2017–18 Ligue 1
2	US Monastir	10	7	1	2	19	9	+10	22	2017–18 Ligue 1
3	CO Médenine	10	5	3	2	16	13	+3	18	Promotion playoff
4	Sporting Ben Arous	10	3	1	6	15	17	−2	10	
5	Stade Africain Menzel Bourguiba	10	3	1	6	13	17	−4	10	
6	AS Djerba	10	0	2	8	6	23	−17	2	

Updated to match(es) played on 21 May 2017. Source: Ligue 2
Rules for classification: 1) points; 2) goal difference; 3) number of goals scored.

==== Promotion Playoffs result table ====
Home \ Away	ASD	COM	SBA	SAMB	ST	USM
AS Djerba	—	1–1	1–4	2–3	0–3	0–0
CO Médenine	1–0	—	2–1	3–0	1–0	2–1
Sporting Ben Arous	2–0	2–2	—	2–1	0–1	1–4
Stade Africain Menzel Bourguiba	2–1	2–2	3–2	—	0–1	1–2
Stade Tunisien	4–1	3–0	1–0	1–0	—	1–0
US Monastir	3–0	3–2	2–1	3–1	1–0	—

Updated to match(es) played on 21 May 2017. Source: Ligue 2
Legend: Blue = home team win; Yellow = draw; Red = away team win.

== Promotion playoff ==
This game was played between the 6th of Ligue 1 Relegation Group and the 3rd of Ligue 2.

3 June 2017
15:30

AS Marsa	0–2	CO Médenine

Stade Hamda Laouani, Kairouan

== See also ==
- 2016–17 Tunisian Ligue Professionnelle 1
- 2016–17 Tunisian Ligue Professionnelle 3
- 2016–17 Tunisian Cup
