= 2008–09 Tunisian Ligue Professionnelle 2 =

Tunisian Ligue Professionnelle 2
- Season: 2008-09
- Promoted: US Ben Guerdane; STIR S Zarzouna

The 2008–09 season of the Tunisian Ligue Professionnelle 2 began on 16 August 2008 and will end on 27 May 2009. Espoir Sportif de Hammam-Sousse are the reigning champions. The competition saw the return of two previous participants, US Ben Guerdane and STIR S Zarzouna from Ligue Professionnelle 3.

== Member clubs 2008-09 ==
- AS Ariana
- AS Djerba
- AS Gabès
- CS Korba
- CS M'saken
- EM Mahdia
- ES Beni-Khalled
- ES Zarzis
- JS Kairouanaise
- Olympique du Kef
- SA Menzel Bourguiba
- Stade Gabèsien
- STIR S Zarzouna
- US Ben Guerdane

== Standings ==
Pos	Team	Pld	W	D	L	GF	GA	GD	Pts	Promotion or relegation
1	ES Zarzis	26	17	5	4	43	18	+25	56	Promotion to 2009–10 CLP-1
2	JS Kairouan	26	12	10	4	37	17	+20	46	Promotion to 2009–10 CLP-1
3	Stade Gabèsien	26	12	9	5	31	19	+12	45	
4	CS M'saken	26	11	10	5	32	24	+8	43	
5	AS Djerba	26	10	7	9	30	27	+3	37	
6	CS Korba	26	9	7	10	31	15	+16	34	
7	ES Beni-Khalled	26	8	9	9	28	31	−3	33	
8	AS Gabès	26	8	8	10	28	33	−5	32	
9	Olympique du Kef	26	7	9	10	23	29	−6	30	
10	EM Mahdia	26	6	11	9	23	31	−8	29	
11	US Ben Guerdane	26	7	8	11	23	32	−9	29	
12	SA Menzel Bourguiba	26	7	6	13	27	36	−9	27	
13	AS Ariana	26	6	9	11	22	29	−7	27	Relegation to 2009–10 CLP-3
14	Stir S Zarzouna	26	4	8	14	20	37	−17	20	Relegation to 2009–10 CLP-3

Updated to match(es) played on 17 May 2009. Source: kawarji.com
Rules for classification: 1) points; 2) goal difference; 3) number of goals scored.

== Results ==
Home \ Away	ASA	ASD	ASG	CSK	CSM	EMM	ESBK	ESZ	JSK	OKef	SAMB	SG	SSZ	USBG
AS Ariana	—			2–0		0–1	1–3	2–3	0–0					1–0
AS Djerba		—	2–0	2–2	0–1			0–1				1–0	2–1	
AS Gabès	1–0		—	2–2	2–0	1–1					0–0	1–1		
CS Korba				—		1–0					2–1	2–1	2–1	
CS M'saken	1–1			2–1	—	2–2					2–0			
EM Mahdia						—	2–0	1–4	1–2		2–1		3–0	0–0
ES Beni-Khalled		2–3	2–1				—	1–1	0–0	0–2				
ES Zarzis					1–0			—	0–0	2–0		0–1		
JS Kairouan			1–1	1–0					—	5–0		3–2		5–1
Olympique du Kef		0–0		1–1	1–2					—		1–2	1–0	
SA Menzel Bourguiba		1–1					2–1	1–2		1–1	—			3–1
Stade Gabèsien	3–0					1–1						—	1–0	2–0
Stir S Zarzouna	0–2						1–0	0–2	1–0	0–1	1–1		—	
US Ben Guerdane		2–1	0–2		0–0		1–0			2–1				—

Updated to match(es) played on 3 December 2008. Source: Kawarji.com
Legend: Blue = home team win; Yellow = draw; Red = away team win.

== Promotions and relegations ==
=== Promoted to CLP-1 on 2008-09 ===
- ES Zarzis
- JS Kairouanaise

=== Relegated from CLP-1 on 2008-09 ===
- AS Marsa
- Jendouba Sport

=== Promoted from CLP-3 on 2008-09 ===
- Spot 1
- Spot 2

=== Relegated to CLP-3 on 2008–09 ===
- AS Ariana
- STIR S Zarzouna

== Television rights ==
The Communication bureau of the FTF attributed the broadcasting rights of the Tunisian Ligue Professionnelle 2 to Hannibal TV.
