= 2009–10 Tunisian Ligue Professionnelle 2 =

- Season: 2008-09
- Champions: AS Marsa
- Promoted: AS Marsa; AS Gabès
- Relegated: EM Mahdia; SA Menzel Bourguiba

The 2009–10 season of the Tunisian Ligue Professionnelle 2 began on 16 August 2009 and ended on 27 May 2009. AS Marsa became champions of the 2009–10 season and were promoted to the 2009–10 CLP-1 along with AS Gabès who finished in runners-up.

== Team Movements ==
=== Teams promoted to 2009–10 CLP-1 ===
- ES Zarzis
- JS Kairouanaise

=== Teams relegated from 2008–09 CLP-1 ===
- AS Marsa
- Jendouba Sport

=== Teams promoted from 2008–09 CLP-3 ===
- EA Mateur
- LPTA Tozeur

=== Teams relegated to 2009–10 CLP-3 ===
- SA Menzel Bourguiba
- STIR S Zarzouna

== Member clubs 2009-10 ==
- AS Djerba
- AS Gabès
- AS Marsa
- CS Korba
- CS M'saken
- EA Mateur
- EM Mahdia
- ES Beni-Khalled
- Jendouba Sport
- LPTA Tozeur
- Olympique du Kef
- SA Menzel Bourguiba
- Stade Gabèsien
- US Ben Guerdane

== Table ==
Pos	Team	Pld	W	D	L	GF	GA	GD	Pts	Promotion or relegation
1	AS Marsa (C, P)	26	19	2	5	44	17	+27	59	Promotion to 2010–11 CLP-1
2	AS Gabès (P)	26	15	7	4	42	23	+19	52	Promotion to 2010–11 CLP-1
3	Stade Gabèsien	26	13	6	7	29	19	+10	45	
4	ES Beni-Khalled	26	13	4	9	30	23	+7	43	
5	CS M'saken	26	12	3	11	32	32	0	39	
6	LPTA Tozeur	26	11	4	11	29	30	−1	37	
7	Jendouba Sport	26	10	7	9	27	30	−3	37	
8	AS Djerba	26	10	5	11	34	30	+4	35	
9	US Ben Guerdane	26	8	10	8	25	27	−2	34	
10	Olympique du Kef	26	8	6	12	29	34	−5	30	
11	CS Korba	26	8	5	13	19	26	−7	29	
12	EA Mateur	26	8	5	13	19	31	−12	29	
13	EM Mahdia (R)	26	8	4	14	21	29	−8	28	Relegation to 2010–11 CLP-3
14	SA Menzel Bourguiba (R)	26	1	8	17	20	49	−29	11	Relegation to 2010–11 CLP-3

Rules for classification: 1) points; 2) goal difference; 3) number of goals scored.
(C) Champions; (P) Promoted; (R) Relegated

== Television rights ==
The Communication bureau of the FTF attributed the broadcasting rights of the Tunisian Ligue Professionnelle 2 to Hannibal TV.
