= 2017–18 Tunisian Ligue Professionnelle 2 =

Tunisian Ligue Professionnelle 2
- Season: 2017–18
- Relegated: Olympique Béja; AS Djerba; AS Ariana; SS Zarzouna
- Matches played: 210
- Goals scored: 454 (2.16 per match)
- Biggest home win: EGSG 5–0 SSZ
- Biggest away win: OB 0–3 CS Chebba; SSS 0–3 CSHL
- Highest scoring: ESHS 4–3 ASK; CSK 5–2 SSZ

The 2017–18 Tunisian Ligue Professionnelle 2 (Tunisian Professional League) was the 63rd season since Tunisia's independence.

== Teams ==
Locations of the 2017–18 Ligue 2 teams
Group A
Group B

=== Group A ===
- AS Ariana
- AS Marsa
- AS Kasserine
- CS Korba
- EGS Gafsa
- ES Hammam-Sousse
- Océano Club de Kerkennah
- Sfax Railway Sports
- Stir Sportive Zarzouna
- US Tataouine

=== Group B ===
- AS Djerba
- AS Soliman
- CS Hammam-Lif
- CS Chebba
- EO Sidi Bouzid
- Jendouba Sport
- Olympique Béja
- Sporting Ben Arous
- Stade Africain Menzel Bourguiba
- Stade Sportif Sfaxien

== Results ==
=== Group A ===
==== Table ====
Pos	Team	Pld	W	D	L	GF	GA	GD	Pts	Qualification or relegation
1	US Tataouine	18	12	2	4	29	16	+13	38	Qualification for Promotion Group
2	EGS Gafsa	18	10	4	4	27	15	+12	34	Qualification for Promotion Group
3	Sfax Railway Sports	18	9	3	6	17	12	+5	30	Qualification for Promotion Group
4	AS Marsa	18	8	5	5	22	18	+4	29	
5	AS Kasserine	18	6	6	6	26	26	0	24	
6	CS Korba	18	6	5	7	21	20	+1	23	
7	ES Hammam-Sousse	18	4	9	5	18	18	0	21	
8	Océano Club de Kerkennah	18	5	5	8	14	18	−4	20	
9	AS Ariana	18	6	1	11	16	26	−10	19	Relegation to Tunisian Ligue Professionnelle 3
10	Stir Sportive Zarzouna	18	1	6	11	10	31	−21	9	Relegation to Tunisian Ligue Professionnelle 3

Updated to match(es) played on 2 March 2018. Source: Ligue 2 Group A
Rules for classification: 1) points; 2) goal difference; 3) number of goals scored.

==== Result table ====
Home \ Away	ASA	ASM	ASK	CSK	EGSG	ESHS	OCK	SRS	SSZ	UST
AS Ariana	—	0–0	1–0	3–1	3–1	1–2	4–2	0–2	1–0	0–2
AS Marsa	3–1	—	3–3	1–0	0–2	1–1	2–0	1–0	4–1	2–1
AS Kasserine	3–1	2–0	—	2–2	1–1	1–0	0–0	0–2	2–0	3–2
CS Korba	2–0	1–1	2–1	—	0–2	0–0	0–1	1–0	5–2	1–0
EGS Gafsa	2–0	1–0	3–1	1–0	—	1–0	2–0	2–0	5–0	1–1
ES Hammam-Sousse	0–1	0–1	4–3	1–1	2–2	—	2–1	2–0	0–0	1–1
Océano Club de Kerkennah	1–0	0–1	1–1	0–2	3–0	1–1	—	0–0	2–0	0–1
Sfax Railway Sports	3–0	2–1	0–1	2–1	2–1	0–0	0–0	—	1–0	1–2
Stir Sportive Zarzouna	1–0	0–0	1–1	1–1	0–0	1–1	1–2	0–1	—	2–4
US Tataouine	1–0	3–1	3–1	2–1	2–0	2–1	1–0	0–1	1–0	—

Updated to match(es) played on 2 March 2018. Source: Ligue 2 Group A
Legend: Blue = home team win; Yellow = draw; Red = away team win.

=== Group B ===
==== Table ====
Pos	Team	Pld	W	D	L	GF	GA	GD	Pts	Qualification or relegation
1	EO Sidi Bouzid	18	7	6	5	22	16	+6	27	Qualification for Promotion Group
2	CS Chebba	18	7	7	4	23	15	+8	28	Qualification for Promotion Group
3	CS Hammam-Lif	18	5	10	3	15	11	+4	25	Qualification for Promotion Group
4	Stade Africain Menzel Bourguiba	18	7	4	7	18	19	−1	25	
5	AS Soliman	18	6	6	6	19	15	+4	24	
6	Jendouba Sport	18	6	5	7	14	16	−2	23	
7	Stade Sportif Sfaxien	18	7	2	9	16	24	−8	23	
8	Sporting Ben Arous	18	5	6	7	16	21	−5	21	
9	Olympique Béja	18	7	5	6	17	19	−2	20 (Note: Olympique Béja was docked 6 points by FIFA for not paying a fee to a club from the Netherlands.)	Relegation to Tunisian Ligue Professionnelle 3
10	AS Djerba	18	5	5	8	19	23	−4	20	Relegation to Tunisian Ligue Professionnelle 3

Updated to match(es) played on 2 March 2018. Source: Ligue 2 Group A
Rules for classification: 1) points; 2) goal difference; 3) number of goals scored.

==== Result table ====
Home \ Away	ASD	ASS	CSHL	CSC	EOSB	JS	OB	SBA	SAMB	SSS
AS Djerba	—	1–0	1–1	1–1	1–0	2–0	1–2	2–1	0–1	2–1
AS Soliman	2–0	—	2–1	0–0	3–1	0–0	1–1	4–0	1–1	1–0
CS Hammam-Lif	1–1	1–0	—	0–0	2–2	1–1	0–0	0–0	0–0	2–0
CS Chebba	3–2	0–0	0–0	—	3–1	1–0	3–0	1–2	0–2	2–0
EO Sidi Bouzid	1–1	2–0	1–0	1–0	—	1–0	0–1	2–1	4–0	3–0
Jendouba Sport	2–1	1–0	0–1	1–1	1–1	—	0–0	3–1	1–0	1–0
Olympique Béja	2–0	2–1	1–1	0–3	1–0	0–1	—	1–1	1–0	2–1
Sporting Ben Arous	1–1	0–0	2–0	2–3	0–0	2–0	2–1	—	1–0	0–1
Stade Africain Menzel Bourguiba	2–1	2–3	0–1	1–1	2–2	2–1	1–0	2–0	—	2–1
Stade Sportif Sfaxien	2–1	2–1	0–3	2–1	0–0	2–1	3–2	0–0	1–0	—

Updated to match(es) played on 2 March 2018. Source: Ligue 2 Group B
Legend: Blue = home team win; Yellow = draw; Red = away team win.

== Playoffs ==
=== Promotion Playoffs ===
==== Promotion Playoffs table ====
Pos	Team	Pld	W	D	L	GF	GA	GD	Pts	Promotion or qualification
1	CS Hammam-Lif	10	7	0	3	15	9	+6	21	2018–19 Ligue 1
2	US Tataouine	10	5	3	2	16	10	+6	18	2018–19 Ligue 1
3	EGS Gafsa	10	5	2	3	12	7	+5	17	Qualification to promotion playoff
4	CS Chebba	10	4	1	5	12	12	0	13	
5	EO Sidi Bouzid	10	2	3	5	8	17	−9	9	
6	Sfax Railways Sports	10	1	3	6	12	20	−8	6	

Updated to match(es) played on 11 May 2018. Source: Ligue 2
Rules for classification: 1) points; 2) goal difference; 3) number of goals scored.

==== Promotion Playoffs result table ====
Home \ Away	CSHL	CSC	EGSG	EOSB	SRS	UST
CS Hammam-Lif	—	2–0	0–1	2–0	2–1	2–1
CS Chebba	2–3	—	1–0	3–0	2–0	1–1
EGS Gafsa	1–0	1–0	—	1–1	4–0	0–0
EO Sidi Bouzid	1–3	2–1	1–0	—	1–1	1–2
Sfax Railways Sports	0–1	3–1	2–3	1–1	—	3–3
US Tataouine	2–0	0–1	2–1	3–0	2–1	—

Updated to match(es) played on 11 May 2018. Source: Ligue 2
Legend: Blue = home team win; Yellow = draw; Red = away team win.
For upcoming matches, an "a" indicates there is an article about the rivalry between the two participants.

== Promotion playoff ==
This game was played between the 12th of Ligue 1 and the 3rd of Ligue 2.

18 May 2018
22:00

US Ben Guerdane	1–1	EGS Gafsa
Jaziri 48' (pen.)		49' Dhifallah

Stade 7 November, Radès

Match stopped after 62 minutes because EGS Gafsa players left the pitch as a protest against the referee who was "clearly against them" and declared that they "couldn't play a football match in such conditions".

== See also ==
- 2017–18 Tunisian Ligue Professionnelle 1
- 2017–18 Tunisian Cup
