= 2010–11 Tunisian Ligue Professionnelle 2 =

- Season: 2010-11

The 2010–11 season Tunisian Ligue Professionnelle 2 is the current of second-tier football in Tunisia. The competition began on 16 August 2010 and is scheduled to end on the 27 May 2011.

== Team Movements ==
=== Teams promoted to 2010–11 CLP-1 ===
- AS Marsa
- AS Gabès

=== Teams relegated from 2008–09 CLP-1 ===
- US Monastir
- AS Kasserine

=== Teams promoted from 2008–09 CLP-3 ===
- CO Transports
- SC Moknine

=== Teams relegated to 2010–11 CLP-3 ===
- EM Mahdia
- SA Menzel Bourguiba

== Participating clubs ==
- AS Djerba
- AS Kasserine
- CO Transports
- CS Korba
- CS M'saken
- EA Mateur
- ES Beni-Khalled
- Jendouba Sport
- LPST Tozeur
- Olympique du Kef
- SC Moknine
- Stade Gabèsien
- US Ben Guerdane
- US Monastir

== Table ==
Pos	Team	Pld	W	D	L	GF	GA	GD	Pts	Promotion or relegation
1	US Monastir (P)	26	14	9	3	36	20	+16	51	Promotion to 2011–12 CLP-1
2	ES Beni-Khalled (P)	26	13	7	6	37	29	+8	46	Promotion to 2011–12 CLP-1
3	Stade Gabèsien	26	11	7	8	35	26	+9	40	
4	LPST Tozeur	26	12	3	11	31	26	+5	39	
5	AS Djerba	26	9	9	8	30	29	+1	36	
6	EA Mateur	26	9	8	9	20	25	−5	35	
7	CO Transports	26	8	10	8	26	27	−1	34	
8	CS Korba	26	9	7	10	30	32	−2	34	
9	SC Moknine	26	8	7	11	33	35	−2	31	
10	Jendouba Sport	26	7	10	9	26	29	−3	31	
11	AS Kasserine	26	7	10	9	24	28	−4	31	
12	CS M'saken	26	7	9	10	27	31	−4	30	
13	Olympique du Kef (R)	26	7	9	10	23	26	−3	30	Relegation to 2011–12 CLP-3
14	US Ben Guerdane (R)	26	4	9	13	20	35	−15	21	Relegation to 2011–12 CLP-3

Updated to match(es) played on 3 July 2011. Source: Soccerway.com
Rules for classification: 1) points; 2) goal difference; 3) number of goals scored.
(P) Promoted; (R) Relegated

== Television rights ==
The Communication bureau of the FTF attributed the broadcasting rights of the Tunisian Ligue Professionnelle 2 to Hannibal TV.
