= 2014–15 Tunisian Ligue Professionnelle 2 =

Tunisian Ligue Professionnelle 2
- Season: 2014–15
- Promoted: US Ben Guerdane; AS Kasserine; EO Sidi Bouzid
- Relegated: Enfida Sports; LPS Tozeur; AS Oued Ellil
- Matches: 211
- Goals: 465 (2.2 per match)
- Biggest home win: CSM 5–1 ASA
- Biggest away win: SSS 2–5 CS Korba
- Highest scoring: SSS 2–5 CS Korba

The 2014–15 Tunisian Ligue Professionnelle 2 (Tunisian Professional League) season was the 60th season since Tunisia's independence.

== Teams ==
A total of 20 teams will contest the league split into two groups of 10 teams each. Olympique Béja, LPS Tozeur and Grombalia Sports were the 3 last teams of the 2013–14 Ligue 1 season and were therefore relegated.

Locations of the 2014–15 Ligue 2 teams
Group A
Group B

== Results ==
=== Group A ===
Pos	Team	Pld	W	D	L	GF	GA	GD	Pts	Qualification or relegation
1	Sfax Railways Sports	18	8	8	2	23	14	+9	32	Qualification for Promotion Playoffs
2	Olympique du Kef	18	7	8	3	20	14	+6	29	Qualification for Promotion Playoffs
3	EO Sidi Bouzid	18	8	5	5	22	19	+3	29	Qualification for Promotion Playoffs
4	CS Korba	18	7	4	7	21	23	−2	25	
5	Olympique Béja	18	6	6	6	18	17	+1	24	
6	US Sbeitla	18	5	8	5	18	16	+2	23	
7	FC Hammamet	18	5	6	7	18	18	0	21	
8	Jendouba Sport	18	6	3	9	20	25	−5	21	
9	Stade Sportif Sfaxien	18	5	4	9	16	22	−6	19	Qualification for Relegation Playoff
10	LPS Tozeur	18	3	8	7	12	20	−8	17	Relegation to 2015–16 Ligue 3

Updated to match(es) played on 14 March 2015. Source: LIGUE 2 Group A
Rules for classification: 1) points; 2) goal difference; 3) number of goals scored.

Home \ Away	CSK	EOSB	FCH	JS	LPST	OB	OK	SRS	SSS	USSB
CS Korba		1–2	1–0	0–2	2–0	1–2	1–1	1–0	1–1	0–2
EO Sidi Bouzid	1–2		1–0	2–1	2–1	1–1	1–0	1–1	2–2	2–0
FC Hammamet	0–1	3–1		2–0	2–0	2–1	1–1	1–2	1–1	0–2
Jendouba Sport	3–1	2–3	0–0		2–1	1–0	0–1	1–1	0–1	2–0
LPS Tozeur	1–1	1–0	1–0	2–0		1–4	1–1	0–0	0–0	1–1
Olympique Béja	2–1	1–0	2–2	1–2	0–0		1–1	0–2	1–0	0–0
Olympique du Kef	0–0	0–0	1–1	4–2	1–0	1–0		1–0	4–1	1–0
Sfax Railways Sports	4–1	2–1	1–1	2–1	1–1	1–0	1–1		1–0	1–1
Stade Sportif Sfaxien	2–5	0–1	0–1	3–0	2–0	0–1	2–1	0–1		1–0
Union Sportive Sbeitla	0–1	1–1	2–1	1–1	1–1	1–1	2–0	2–2	2–0	

Updated to match(es) played on 14 March 2015. Source: Ligue 2 Group A
Legend: Blue = home team win; Yellow = draw; Red = away team win.

=== Group B ===
Pos	Team	Pld	W	D	L	GF	GA	GD	Pts	Qualification or relegation
1	AS Kasserine	18	12	3	3	28	11	+17	39	Qualification for Promotion Playoffs
2	US Ben Guerdane	18	9	4	5	26	13	+13	31	Qualification for Promotion Playoffs
3	ES Hammam-Sousse	18	9	4	5	18	10	+8	31	Qualification for Promotion Playoffs
4	Grombalia Sports	18	9	3	6	23	16	+7	30	
5	EM Mahdia	18	7	3	8	22	22	0	24	
6	Sporting Ben Arous	18	6	4	8	19	24	−5	22	
7	CS M'saken	18	5	6	7	18	21	−3	21	
8	AS Ariana	18	6	2	10	18	32	−14	20	
9	AS Oued Ellil	18	5	4	9	15	20	−5	19	Qualification for Relegation Playoff
10	Enfida Sports	18	4	3	11	14	32	−18	15	Relegation to 2015–16 Ligue 3

Updated to match(es) played on 15 March 2015. Source: LIGUE 2 Group B
Rules for classification: 1) points; 2) goal difference; 3) number of goals scored.

Home \ Away	ASA	ASK	ASO	CSM	EMM	ES	ESHS	GS	SBA	USBG
AS Ariana		0–2	1–0	2–2	2–1	3–2	1–2	2–0	2–1	2–2
AS Kasserine	2–0		0–0	2–0	2–1	2–0	2–1	2–1	3–0	2–1
AS Oued Ellil	2–1	1–3		3–1	1–2	1–0	0–1	0–2	0–1	1–0
CS M'saken	5–1	1–1	0–0		0–2	4–0	0–2	1–0	1–0	1–4
EM Mahdia	1–0	0–1	2–1	2–0		2–1	0–2	1–1	2–2	0–1
Enfida Sports	2–0	0–0	0–1	1–0	2–1		0–3	1–0	0–3	1–1
ES Hammam-Sousse	0–1	1–0	2–1	0–0	0–0	2–2		1–0	0–1	1–0
Grombalia Sports	4–0	1–0	3–3	1–2	2–1	1–0	1–0		1–0	2–1
Sporting Ben Arous	1–0	1–4	0–0	0–0	2–3	4–2	0–0	1–3		2–1
US Ben Guerdane	3–0	2–0	1–0	0–0	2–1	4–0	1–0	0–0	2–0	

Updated to match(es) played on 15 March 2015. Source: Ligue 2 Group B
Legend: Blue = home team win; Yellow = draw; Red = away team win.

== Playoffs ==
=== Promotion playoffs ===
Pos	Team	Pld	W	D	L	GF	GA	GD	Pts	Qualification or relegation
1	US Ben Guerdane	10	6	2	2	14	8	+6	20	Promotion to 2015–16 Ligue 1
2	AS Kasserine	10	6	2	2	16	11	+5	20	Promotion to 2015–16 Ligue 1
3	EO Sidi Bouzid	10	4	5	1	15	11	+4	17	Promotion to 2015–16 Ligue 1
4	ES Hammam-Sousse	10	4	2	4	14	13	+1	14	
5	Sfax Railways Sports	10	1	3	6	8	13	−5	6	
6	Olympique du Kef	10	1	2	7	4	15	−11	4 (Note: 1 point was deducted from Olympique du Kef for refusing to play the Round 10 game against US Ben Guerdane.)	

Updated to match(es) played on 31 May 2015. Source: Ligue 2 Promotion Playoff
Rules for classification: 1) points; 2) goal difference; 3) number of goals scored.
Notes:

Home \ Away	ASK	ESHS	EOSB	OK	SRS	USBG
AS Kasserine		1–2	4–4	1–1	1–0	1–0
ES Hammam-Sousse	1–2		1–1	1–0	2–2	1–2
EO Sidi Bouzid	0–2	2–1		1–0	2–1	0–0
Olympique du Kef	0–1	0–3	0–3		0–0	2–1
Sfax Railways Sports	0–1	1–2	1–1	2–1		0–1
US Ben Guerdane	3–2	2–0	1–1	2–0 (Note: US Ben Guerdane was awarded a 2-0 win (Round 10) after Olympique du Kef players refused to play as a protest since their wages were not paid.)	2–1	

Updated to match(es) played on 31 May 2015. Source: Ligue 2 Promotion Playoff
Legend: Blue = home team win; Yellow = draw; Red = away team win.

=== Relegation playoff ===
10 April 2015
14:30

Stade Sportif Sfaxien	5–0	AS Oued Ellil
Bilel Ouerfelli 34', 45'; Fakhreddine Ghribi 53' (pen.); Kais Trabelsi 65'; Ahmed Dhifallah 82'

Stade Mongi Slim, Moknine

==== Relegated teams ====
- Enfida Sports on 28 February 2015 (Week 16 out of 18)
- LPS Tozeur on 14 March 2015 (Week 18 out of 18)
- AS Oued Ellil on 10 April 2015 (relegation playoff)

== See also ==
- 2014–15 Tunisian Ligue Professionnelle 1
- 2014–15 Tunisian Ligue Professionnelle 3
- 2014–15 Tunisian Cup
