= 2014–15 Tunisian Ligue 3 =

Tunisian Ligue 3
- Season: 2014–15
- Promoted: US Siliana; STIR Zarzouna; US Tataouine
- Relegated: Éclair Testourien; FS Ksar Gafsa; CS Cheminots; RS Sbiba; AS Menzel Ennour; Mouldia Manouba; AS Teboulba; ES Rogba; CS Menzel Bouzelfa; ES Bouchemma; CO Ghannouch; AS Mégrine Sport
- Matches played: 546
- Goals scored: 1,231 (2.25 per match)

The 2014–15 Tunisian Ligue 3 (Tunisian Professional League) season began on 7 November 2014.
42 teams compete in 3 groups of 14 teams each. The winner of each group is promoted to Tunisian Ligue Professionnelle 2, while the four last teams of each group are relegated to the Tunisian Ligue 4.

== Teams ==
=== North Group ===
- STIR Sportive Zarzouna
- Stade Africain Menzel Bourguiba
- ES Radès
- JS Soukra
- JS El Omrane
- AS Mhamdia
- VS Menzel Abderrahmane
- US Bousalem
- Dahmani AC
- CO Transports
- Club Sportif des Cheminots
- Éclair Testourien
- Mouldia Manouba
- Association Mégrine Sport

=== Center Group ===
- CS Hilalien
- AS Soliman
- ES Fahs
- CS Makthar
- AS Menzel Nour
- US Siliana
- CS Menzel Bouzelfa
- AS Teboulba
- ES Beni-Khalled
- HS Kalâa Kebira
- ES Djemmal
- ES Haffouz
- RS Sbiba
- Ahly Bouhjar

=== South Group ===
- Espoir Sportif de Jerba Midoun
- Club olympique de Médenine
- ES Bouchemma
- US Tataouine
- ES Rogba Tataouine
- SS Gafsa
- ES Feriana
- PS Sakiet Daier
- CS Redeyef
- CO Ghannouch
- US Ksour Essef
- Sporting Club Moknine
- Océano Club de Kerkennah
- FS Ksar Gafsa

== Standings ==
=== North group table ===
| Pos | Team | Pld | W | D | L | GF | GA | GD | Pts | Promotion or relegation |
|---|---|---|---|---|---|---|---|---|---|---|
| 1 | STIR Zarzouna | 26 | 15 | 9 | 2 | 37 | 13 | +24 | 54 | Promotion to Tunisian Ligue Professionnelle 2 |
| 2 | Stade Africain Menzel Bourguiba | 26 | 15 | 8 | 3 | 43 | 20 | +23 | 53 | |
| 3 | ES Radès | 26 | 14 | 3 | 9 | 34 | 29 | +5 | 45 | |
| 4 | AS Mhamdia | 26 | 12 | 6 | 8 | 37 | 25 | +12 | 42 | |
| 5 | CO Transports | 26 | 10 | 8 | 8 | 34 | 27 | +7 | 38 | |
| 6 | US Bousalem | 26 | 11 | 5 | 10 | 29 | 24 | +5 | 38 | |
| 7 | Dahmani AC | 26 | 11 | 5 | 10 | 40 | 36 | +4 | 38 | |
| 8 | JS El Omrane | 26 | 10 | 8 | 8 | 27 | 23 | +4 | 38 | |
| 9 | JS Soukra | 26 | 11 | 4 | 11 | 33 | 30 | +3 | 37 | |
| 10 | VS Menzel Abderrahmane | 26 | 11 | 4 | 11 | 25 | 23 | +2 | 37 | |
| 11 | Association Mégrine Sport | 26 | 9 | 9 | 8 | 36 | 28 | +8 | 36 | Relegation to Tunisian Ligue 4 |
| 12 | Mouldia Manouba | 26 | 8 | 6 | 12 | 25 | 27 | −2 | 30 | Relegation to Tunisian Ligue 4 |
| 13 | Club Sportif des Cheminots | 26 | 3 | 5 | 18 | 11 | 41 | −30 | 14 | Relegation to Tunisian Ligue 4 |
| 14 | Éclair Testourien | 26 | 0 | 4 | 22 | 11 | 76 | −65 | 4 | Relegation to Tunisian Ligue 4 |

Updated to match(es) played on 17 May 2015. Source: Ligue 3
Rules for classification: 1) points; 2) goal difference; 3) number of goals scored.

=== Center group table ===
| Pos | Team | Pld | W | D | L | GF | GA | GD | Pts | Promotion or relegation |
|---|---|---|---|---|---|---|---|---|---|---|
| 1 | US Siliana | 26 | 17 | 6 | 3 | 38 | 17 | +21 | 57 | Promotion to Tunisian Ligue Professionnelle 2 |
| 2 | CS Hilalien | 26 | 15 | 5 | 6 | 39 | 22 | +17 | 50 | |
| 3 | ES Fahs | 26 | 12 | 9 | 5 | 34 | 19 | +15 | 45 | |
| 4 | AS Soliman | 26 | 13 | 4 | 9 | 35 | 22 | +13 | 43 | |
| 5 | ES Beni-Khalled | 26 | 10 | 6 | 10 | 28 | 22 | +6 | 36 | |
| 6 | ES Haffouz | 26 | 10 | 6 | 10 | 22 | 25 | −3 | 36 | |
| 7 | CS Makthar | 26 | 10 | 4 | 12 | 26 | 28 | −2 | 34 | |
| 8 | HS Kalâa Kebira | 26 | 10 | 3 | 13 | 35 | 39 | −4 | 33 | |
| 9 | Ahly Bouhjar | 26 | 9 | 6 | 11 | 22 | 34 | −12 | 33 | |
| 10 | ES Djemmal | 26 | 8 | 8 | 10 | 16 | 25 | −9 | 32 | |
| 11 | CS Menzel Bouzelfa | 26 | 8 | 8 | 10 | 27 | 29 | −2 | 32 | Relegation to Tunisian Ligue 4 |
| 12 | AS Teboulba | 26 | 7 | 9 | 10 | 24 | 30 | −6 | 30 | Relegation to Tunisian Ligue 4 |
| 13 | RS Sbiba | 26 | 5 | 8 | 13 | 16 | 31 | −15 | 22 | Relegation to Tunisian Ligue 4 |
| 14 | AS Menzel Ennour | 26 | 5 | 4 | 17 | 24 | 43 | −19 | 18 | Relegation to Tunisian Ligue 4 |

Updated to match(es) played on 17 May 2015. Source: Ligue 3
Rules for classification: 1) points; 2) goal difference; 3) number of goals scored.

=== South group table ===
| Pos | Team | Pld | W | D | L | GF | GA | GD | Pts | Promotion or relegation |
|---|---|---|---|---|---|---|---|---|---|---|
| 1 | US Tataouine | 26 | 15 | 7 | 4 | 33 | 13 | +20 | 52 | Promotion to Tunisian Ligue Professionnelle 2 |
| 2 | Club Olympique de Médenine | 26 | 16 | 4 | 6 | 44 | 23 | +21 | 52 | |
| 3 | ES Feriana | 26 | 14 | 4 | 8 | 39 | 25 | +14 | 46 | |
| 4 | Espoir Sportif de Jerba Midoun | 26 | 13 | 4 | 9 | 39 | 28 | +11 | 42 | |
| 5 | PS Sakiet Daier | 26 | 12 | 3 | 11 | 35 | 33 | +2 | 39 | |
| 6 | SC Moknine | 26 | 11 | 3 | 12 | 30 | 29 | +1 | 36 | |
| 7 | US Ksour Essef | 26 | 11 | 3 | 12 | 27 | 32 | −5 | 36 | |
| 8 | CS Redeyef | 26 | 10 | 6 | 10 | 18 | 23 | −5 | 36 | |
| 9 | SS Gafsa | 26 | 10 | 5 | 11 | 26 | 34 | −8 | 35 | |
| 10 | Océano Club de Kerkennah | 26 | 10 | 4 | 12 | 31 | 29 | +2 | 34 | |
| 11 | ES Bouchemma | 26 | 8 | 8 | 10 | 33 | 35 | −2 | 32 | Relegation to Tunisian Ligue 4 |
| 12 | ES Rogba Tataouine | 26 | 8 | 6 | 12 | 24 | 34 | −10 | 30 | Relegation to Tunisian Ligue 4 |
| 13 | CO Ghannouch | 26 | 9 | 2 | 15 | 23 | 35 | −12 | 29 | Relegation to Tunisian Ligue 4 |
| 14 | FS Ksar Gafsa | 26 | 4 | 3 | 19 | 21 | 50 | −29 | 15 | Relegation to Tunisian Ligue 4 |

Updated to match(es) played on 17 May 2015. Source: Ligue 3
Rules for classification: 1) points; 2) goal difference; 3) number of goals scored.

== See also ==
- 2014–15 Tunisian Ligue Professionnelle 1
- 2014–15 Tunisian Ligue Professionnelle 2
- 2014–15 Tunisian Cup
