= 2016–17 Tunisian Ligue 3 =

Tunisian Ligue 3
- Season: 2016–17

The 2016–17 Tunisian Ligue 3 (Tunisian Professional League) was competed by 48 teams divided in 4 groups of 12 teams each.
The winner of each group is promoted to Tunisian Ligue Professionnelle 2.

== Teams ==
=== Group 1 ===
- Ahly Mateur
- AS Metline
- Association Mégrine Sport
- AS Mhamdia
- AS Oued Ellil
- AS Soukra
- CO Transports
- ES Radès
- JS El Omrane
- Mouldia Manouba
- Stir Sportive Zarzouna
- VS Menzel Abderrahmane

=== Group 2 ===
- AS Jelma
- AS Barnoussa
- AS Soliman
- CS Makthar
- Dahmani AC
- ES Haffouz
- ES Beni-Khalled
- ES Fahs
- ES Oueslatia
- RS Sbiba
- US Bousalem
- US Sbeitla

=== Group 3 ===
- Ahly Bouhjar
- AS Rejiche
- CS Bembla
- CS Hergla
- CS Hilalien
- CS Chebba
- El Makarem de Mahdia
- HS Kalâa Kebira
- Kalâa Sport
- Sporting Club Moknine
- Stade Soussien
- US Ksour Essef

=== Group 4 ===
- CS Jbeniana
- CS Redeyef
- Espoir Sportif de Jerba Midoun
- ES El Jem
- ES Feriana
- FS Ksar Gafsa
- LPS Tozeur
- Océano Club de Kerkennah
- PS Sakiet Daier
- US Métouia
- Wydad El Hamma
- ZS Chammakh

== Standings ==
=== Group 1 table ===
Pos	Team	Pld	W	D	L	GF	GA	GD	Pts	Promotion or relegation
1	Stir Sportive Zarzouna	22	14	6	2	44	12	+32	48	Promotion to 2017–18 Ligue 2
2	AS Oued Ellil	22	12	4	6	40	21	+19	40	
3	VS Menzel Abderrahmane	22	10	6	6	28	23	+5	36	
4	CO Transports	22	10	5	7	31	24	+7	35	
5	AS Mhamdia	22	9	8	5	29	22	+7	35	
6	ES Radès	22	10	3	9	29	33	−4	33	
7	Mouldia Manouba	22	8	7	7	24	20	+4	31	
8	JS El Omrane	22	8	6	8	32	23	+9	30	
9	Ahly Mateur	22	8	5	9	28	26	+2	29	Relegation to Tunisian Ligue 4
10	AS Soukra	22	6	3	13	21	34	−13	21	Relegation to Tunisian Ligue 4
11	Association Mégrine Sport	22	4	4	14	18	37	−19	16	Relegation to Tunisian Ligue 4
12	AS Metline	22	3	3	16	17	66	−49	12	Relegation to Tunisian Ligue 4

Updated to match(es) played on 7 May 2017. Source: Ligue 3
Rules for classification: 1) points; 2) goal difference; 3) number of goals scored.

=== Group 2 table ===
Pos	Team	Pld	W	D	L	GF	GA	GD	Pts	Promotion or relegation
1	AS Soliman	22	14	3	5	35	12	+23	45	Promotion to 2017–18 Ligue 2
2	US Bousalem	22	13	3	6	33	22	+11	42	
3	CS Makthar	22	10	6	6	33	19	+14	36	
4	ES Beni-Khalled	22	11	3	8	28	23	+5	36	
5	ES Fahs	22	9	7	6	21	14	+7	34	
6	Dahmani AC	22	8	6	8	24	24	0	30	
7	US Sbeitla	22	9	2	11	23	27	−4	29	
8	AS Barnoussa	22	7	7	8	23	25	−2	28	
9	ES Haffouz	22	7	7	8	25	28	−3	28	Relegation to Tunisian Ligue 4
10	ES Oueslatia	22	8	3	11	23	32	−9	27	Relegation to Tunisian Ligue 4
11	AS Jelma	22	7	3	12	15	27	−12	24	Relegation to Tunisian Ligue 4
12	RS Sbiba	22	3	2	17	13	43	−30	11	Relegation to Tunisian Ligue 4

Updated to match(es) played on 7 May 2017. Source: Ligue 3
Rules for classification: 1) points; 2) goal difference; 3) number of goals scored.

=== Group 3 table ===
Pos	Team	Pld	W	D	L	GF	GA	GD	Pts	Promotion or relegation
1	CS Chebba	22	15	3	4	40	15	+25	48	Promotion to 2017–18 Ligue 2
2	CS Bembla	22	10	6	6	30	26	+4	36	
3	Sporting Club Moknine	21	10	5	6	25	14	+11	35	
4	AS Rejiche	22	10	5	7	29	26	+3	35	
5	CS Hilalien	22	9	7	6	27	21	+6	34	
6	Kalâa Sport	22	8	8	6	25	20	+5	32	
7	Ahly Bouhjar	22	9	5	8	24	23	+1	32	
8	HS Kalâa Kebira	22	8	4	10	26	29	−3	28	
9	El Makarem de Mahdia	22	7	6	9	25	28	−3	27	Relegation to Tunisian Ligue 4
10	US Ksour Essef	21	5	8	8	20	31	−11	23	Relegation to Tunisian Ligue 4
11	Stade Soussien	21	3	10	8	21	29	−8	19	Relegation to Tunisian Ligue 4
12	CS Hergla	21	0	5	16	11	41	−30	5	Relegation to Tunisian Ligue 4

Updated to match(es) played on 7 May 2017. Source: Ligue 3
Rules for classification: 1) points; 2) goal difference; 3) number of goals scored.

=== Group 4 table ===
Pos	Team	Pld	W	D	L	GF	GA	GD	Pts	Promotion or relegation
1	Océano Club de Kerkennah	22	11	6	5	31	19	+12	39	Promotion to 2017–18 Ligue 2
2	CS Redeyef	22	10	8	4	28	16	+12	38	
3	Espoir Sportif de Jerba Midoun	22	10	8	4	26	16	+10	38	
4	LPS Tozeur	22	11	3	8	30	20	+10	36	
5	US Métouia	22	10	6	6	19	17	+2	36	
6	Wydad El Hamma	22	9	7	6	19	12	+7	34	
7	CS Jbeniana	22	9	7	6	31	28	+3	34	
8	PS Sakiet Daier	22	8	9	5	27	22	+5	33	
9	ES Feriana	22	8	2	12	30	30	0	26	Relegation to Tunisian Ligue 4
10	ES El Jem	21	6	5	10	25	39	−14	23	Relegation to Tunisian Ligue 4
11	ZS Chammakh	22	3	5	14	10	34	−24	14	Relegation to Tunisian Ligue 4
12	FS Ksar Gafsa	21	2	2	17	15	38	−23	8	Relegation to Tunisian Ligue 4

Updated to match(es) played on 7 May 2017. Source: Ligue 3
Rules for classification: 1) points; 2) goal difference; 3) number of goals scored.

== See also ==
- 2016–17 Tunisian Ligue Professionnelle 1
- 2016–17 Tunisian Ligue Professionnelle 2
- 2016–17 Tunisian Cup
