= Chiheb Zoghlami =

Tunisian footballer

Personal information
- Full name: Chiheb Zoghlami
- Date of birth: 19 December 1991 (age 34)
- Place of birth: Djerba, Tunisia
- Height: 1.87 m (6 ft 2 in)
- Position: Striker

Senior career*
Years	Team	Apps	(Gls)
2010–2012	CS Sfaxien	5	(0)
2011–2012	→ Stade Gabèsien (loan)		(3)
2012	AS Gabès	2	(0)
2012–2013	Hammam-Sousse	5	(0)
2013–2014	AS Ariana	17	(12)
2014	AS Djerba		(4)
2014–2017	Club Africain	22	(2)
2015–2016	→ Al-Nahda (loan)		
2016	→ US Ben Guerdane (loan)	8	(3)
2016-2017	→ CS Hammam-Lif (loan)	22	(3)
2017–2019	US Ben Guerdane	41	(5)
2019–2021	Stade Tunisien	24	(2)
2020	→ Ohod (loan)	15	(7)
- * Club domestic league appearances and goals

Chiheb Zoghlami (born 19 December 1991) is a Tunisian footballer who currently plays as a forward.

== Career ==
He formerly played for CS Sfaxien, Stade Gabèsien, AS Gabès, Hammam-Sousse, AS Ariana, AS Djerba, Club Africain, Al-Nahda, US Ben Guerdane, CS Hammam-Lif, US Ben Guerdane again, Stade Tunisien, and Ohod.
