= Ammar Ben Sassi =

Tunisian footballer

Personal information
- Date of birth: 19 February 1990 (age 36)
- Position: Forward

Senior career*
Years	Team	Apps	(Gls)
2012–2015	CA Bizertin B		
2012	→ CA Bizertin	3	(0)
2014	→ ES Métlaoui (loan)	7	(2)
2014–2015	→ El Makarem de Mahdia (loan)		
2015–2016	El Makarem de Mahdia		
2016–2017	US Ben Guerdane	6	(0)
2017–?	ES Hammam-Sousse		
- * Club domestic league appearances and goals

Ammar Ben Sassi (born 19 February 1990) is a Tunisian football forward.
