= National Professional Football League (Tunisia) =

- Founded: 1994; 32 years ago
- Country: Tunisia
- Confederation: CAF
- Divisions: Pro League 1 Pro League 2
- Number of clubs: 44
- Level on pyramid: 1–2
- Relegation to: Tunisian Ligue 3
- Domestic cup: League Cup (defunct)
- Current champions: League 1: Club Africain; League 2: PS Sakiet Eddaïer (2024–25)
- Website: lnf-pro.tn
- Current: 2026–27 Tunisian Ligue Professionnelle 1; 2026–27 Tunisian Ligue Professionnelle 2

The National Professional Football League, is a Tunisian governing body that runs the major professional football leagues in Tunisia. It was founded in 1994 and serves under the authority of the Tunisian Football Federation. The league is responsible for overseeing, organizing, and managing the top two leagues in Tunisia and is also responsible for the 44 professional football clubs that contest football in Tunisia (16 in Pro League 1 and 28 in Pro League 2).

Walid Ben Mohamed is the current president of the National Professional Football League since 14 January 2026.

== Presidents ==
- 1994–1998: Abdellatif Dahmani
- 1998–2000: Khaled Sanchou
- 2000–2002: Mohamed Riahi
- 2002–2003: Fethi Ben Youssef
- 2003–2004: Taoufik Anane
- 2004–2010: Ali Hafsi Jeddi
- 2010–2012: Mohamed Sellami
- 2012: Ahmed Ouerfelli (interim)
- 2012–2016: Mohamed Sellami
- 2016–2020: Hafidh Chembah
- 2020–2024: Mohamed Arbi
- 2024–2025: Mohamed Atallah
- 2025–2026: Boussaïri Boujlel (interim)
- 2026–present: Walid Ben Mohamed

== Competitions ==
- Tunisian Ligue Professionnelle 1
- Tunisian Ligue Professionnelle 2
- Tunisian Coupe de la Ligue Professionnelle (1999–2007)
