= 2009–10 Tunisian Ligue Professionnelle 1 =

Tunisian Ligue Professionnelle 1
- Season: 2009–10
- Champions: Espérance de Tunis
- Relegated: AS Kasserine, US Monastir
- Champions League: Espérance de Tunis; Club Africain
- Confederation Cup: Etoile du Sahel; Olympique Béja (cup winner)
- Matches: 182
- Goals: 416 (2.29 per match)
- Top goalscorer: Michael Eneramo (13 goals)
- Biggest home win: EST 7–0 ES Zarzis
- Biggest away win: ESHS 1–5 ESS
- Highest scoring: EST 7–0 ES Zarzis; CSS 6–1 ASK; ESHS 3–4 JSK

The 2009–10 Tunisian Ligue Professionnelle 1(Tunisian Professional League) season was the 55th season of top-tier football in Tunisia. The competition began on 27 July 2009, and concluded on 15 May 2010. The defending champions from the previous season are Espérance de Tunis.

== Team movements ==
=== Teams relegated to CPL-2 ===
- AS Marsa
- Jendouba Sport

=== Teams promoted from CPL-2 ===
- ES Zarzis
- JS Kairouan

== Teams and venues ==
Location of teams in 2009–10 Tunisian Ligue Professionelle 1

Clubs	Venue	Capacity
Avenir Sportif de Kasserine	Kasserine Stadium	8.000
Club Africain	El-Menzah stadium	45.000
Bizerte Athletic F.C.	October 15th stadium	20.000
CS Hammam-Lif	Bou Kornine stadium	8.000
Club Sportif Sfaxien	Taïeb Mhiri's stadium	22.000
El-Gawafel Sportives de Gafsa	Gafsa's 7 November stadium	12.000
Espoir Sportif de Hammam-Sousse	BouAli Lahwar stadium	6.500
Étoile Sportive du Sahel	Sousse's Olympic stadium	30.000
Espérance Sportive de Tunis	Stade 7 November	60.000
Espérance Sportive de Zarzis	Stade Jlidi	8.000
JS Kairouan	Stade de Hamda Laouani	15.000
Olympique de Béja	Boujemaa El-Kemiti stadium	8.000
Stade Tunisien	Chedli Zouiten's stadium	20.000
Union Sportive Monastir	Mustapha Ben Jannet stadium	20.000

== Results ==
=== League table ===
Pos	Team	Pld	W	D	L	GF	GA	GD	Pts	Qualification or relegation
1	Espérance de Tunis	26	16	6	4	56	24	+32	54	Qualification to the 2011 CAF Champions League
2	Club Africain	26	14	8	4	28	15	+13	50	Qualification to the 2011 CAF Champions League
3	Étoile du Sahel	26	13	7	6	41	27	+14	46	Qualification to the 2011 CAF Confederation Cup
4	CA Bizertin	26	11	7	8	36	33	+3	40	
5	Stade Tunisien	26	10	9	7	22	16	+6	39	
6	CS Sfaxien	26	10	7	9	32	26	+6	37	
7	Olympique Béja	26	8	8	10	28	32	−4	32	Qualification to the 2011 CAF Confederation Cup
8	JS Kairouan	26	9	4	13	22	34	−12	31	
9	CS Hammam-Lif	26	8	6	12	30	32	−2	30	
10	ES Zarzis	26	6	11	9	17	26	−9	29	
11	EGS Gafsa	26	7	7	12	29	39	−10	28	
12	ES Hammam-Sousse	26	7	6	13	28	36	−8	27	
13	AS Kasserine	26	8	3	15	22	45	−23	27	Relegation to the Tunisian Ligue Professionnelle 2
14	US Monastir	26	5	11	10	25	30	−5	26	Relegation to the Tunisian Ligue Professionnelle 2

Updated to match(es) played on May 15, 2010 - Competition concluded.. Source: Ligue 1
Rules for classification: 1) points; 2) goal difference; 3) number of goals scored.

=== Result table ===
Home \ Away	ASK	CA	CAB	CSHL	CSS	EGSG	EST	ESZ	ESHS	ESS	JSK	OB	ST	USM
AS Kasserine	—	2–1	2–1	2–1	1–0	0–2	1–0	0–1	2–1	1–2	0–1	0–2	0–1	2–2
Club Africain	2–0	—	2–0	1–0	1–0	1–0	0–0	1–0	1–0	3–0	1–0	2–2	1–1	2–1
CA Bizertin	0–0	1–0	—	1–3	1–1	1–1	2–2	2–0	1–0	2–1	3–2	1–0	0–1	2–2
CS Hammam-Lif	2–0	1–2	1–0	—	2–0	3–2	1–3	0–0	2–3	1–2	0–1	1–2	0–1	0–0
CS Sfaxien	6–1	1–2	4–2	1–1	—	3–0	1–3	0–1	2–0	2–0	1–0	2–1	2–1	1–1
EGS Gafsa	3–0	0–0	3–2	2–4	0–2	—	1–3	1–1	2–0	1–1	1–0	4–1	2–0	0–1
Espérance de Tunis	4–0	1–1	2–4	3–3	4–0	3–0	—	7–0	1–2	0–0	4–0	1–0	1–0	2–0
ES Zarzis	2–0	0–0	0–0	2–0	0–0	1–0	0–1	—	1–0	1–3	1–1	2–2	1–2	1–1
ES Hammam-Sousse	1–2	2–0	0–1	0–1	1–0	1–1	2–2	1–0	—	1–5	3–4	4–1	1–1	0–0
Etoile du Sahel	2–3	2–2	3–1	0–0	2–1	3–0	0–1	1–1	3–2	—	2–0	3–0	0–0	2–1
JS Kairouan	1–0	1–0	0–3	1–0	0–1	2–2	1–3	1–0	0–0	2–1	—	1–2	0–1	2–1
Olympique Béja	3–1	0–1	1–1	2–1	0–0	0–0	0–1	1–0	1–1	1–1	3–1	—	0–0	2–0
Stade Tunisien	3–0	0–0	1–2	0–1	0–0	2–0	4–2	0–0	1–2	0–1	0–0	1–0	—	1–0
US Monastir	2–2	0–1	1–2	1–1	1–1	4–1	1–2	1–1	1–0	0–1	1–0	2–1	0–0	—

Updated to match(es) played on May 15, 2010. Source: Ligue 1
Legend: Blue = home team win; Yellow = draw; Red = away team win.
