= Rafik Mhamdi =

Tunisian football manager

Team information
- Current team: Étoile du Sahel (assistant)

Managerial career
- Years: Team
- 2018–2019: Étoile du Sahel (assistant)
- 2019: Étoile du Sahel
- 2019–2020: Étoile du Sahel (assistant)
- 2020: JS Kairouan
- 2021: ES Hammam-Sousse
- 2021–: Étoile du Sahel (assistant)

Rafik Mhamdi is a Tunisian football manager.
