= Football in Tunisia =

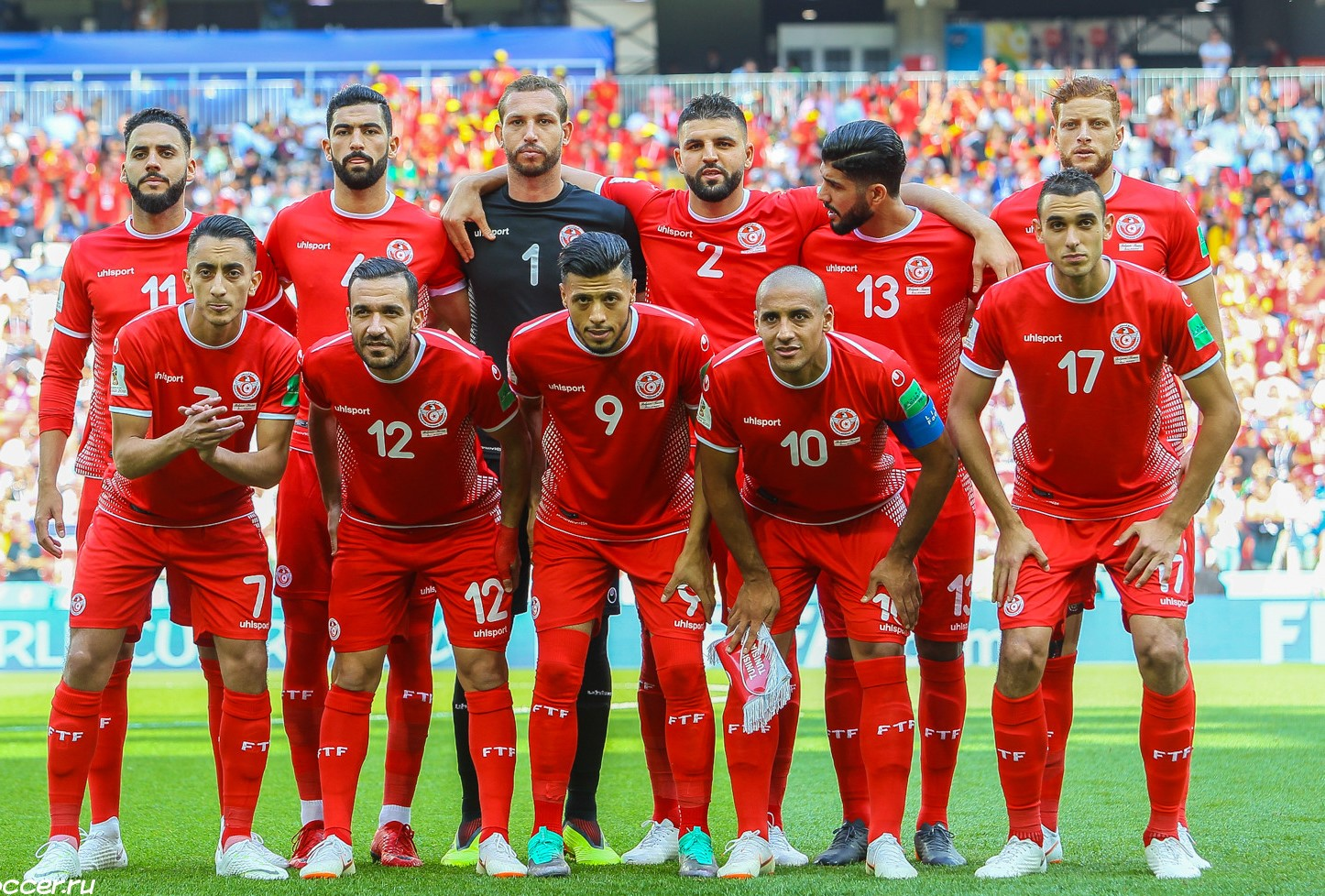
- Tunisia national team at the 2018 FIFA World Cup in Russia
- Country: Tunisia
- Governing body: Tunisian Football Federation
- National teams: men's national team women's national team

National competitions
- Ligue Professionnelle 1 Ligue Professionnelle 2 Tunisian Cup

International competitions
- CAF Champions League; CAF Confederation Cup; CAF Super Cup; FIFA Club World Cup; FIFA World Cup (National Team); African Cup of Nations (National Team); FIFA Confederations Cup (National Team)

Football is the most popular sport in Tunisia, with an estimated 45% of the population declaring an active interest in the sport. The sport was introduced to the region in the late nineteenth century by Italian migrants. The Tunisian Football Federation, established on 29 March 1957 is the sport's national governing body, assuming domestic control following independence in 1956. The country features a structured tier system, spearheaded by the professional top-flight division, the Pro League 1, followed by Pro League 2. The winner of the Pro League 1 is crowned the Tunisian football champion.

== National team ==
Tunisia have reached six FIFA World Cup final competitions (1978, 1998, 2002, 2006, 2018 and 2022), and have also appeared at the African Cup of Nations on 13 occasions, winning once (2004).

== Domestic leagues ==
The game is played nationwide with two professional leagues: LP-1, LP-2, one semi-professional league LP-3 and at an amateur level in the 4 regions and 24 governorates that make up the country.

The league system of football leagues in Tunisia refers to the official ranking system of football leagues and divisions in this nation.

== Men's structure ==
Pyramidal structure of football leagues in Tunisia for the 2025–26 season
| Niveau | League system | | | | | |
|---|---|---|---|---|---|---|
| 1 | Pro League 1; 16 teams | | | | | |
| 2 | Pro League 2 Group 2 – 14 teams | | | Pro League 2 Group 1 – 14 teams | | |
| 3 | League 3 Level 1 Group 1 – 14 teams | | League 3 Level 1 Group 2 – 14 teams | League 3 Level 1 Group 3 – 14 teams | | League 3 Level 1 Group 4 – 14 teams |
| 4 | League 3 Level 2 Group 1 – 10 teams | League 3 Level 2 Group 2 – 10 teams | League 3 Level 2 Group 3 – 10 teams | League 3 Level 2 Group 4 – 11 teams | League 3 Level 2 Group 5 – 10 teams | League 3 Level 2 Group 6 – 11 teams |
| 5 | League 4 Regional Leagues | | | | | |
| 5 | Tunis League; 15 teams (3 groups x 5 teams) | Nabeul League; 12 teams (2 groups x 6 teams) | Sousse League; 9 teams (single group) | Monastir League; 8 teams (single group) | Sfax League; 7 teams (single group) | Gabes League; 7 teams (single group) |
| 5 | Bizerte League; 8 teams (single group) | Kef League; 6 teams (single group) | Kairouan League; 7 teams (single group) | Sidi Bouzid League; 7 teams (single group) | Gafsa League; 4 teams (single group) | Medenine League; 5 teams (single group) |

== +50,000-capacity stadiums in Tunisia ==
| N° | Image | Stadium | Capacity | Opened | City | Club |
|---|---|---|---|---|---|---|
| 1. | | Stade Hammadi Agrebi | 60,000 | 6 July 2001 | Radès, Ben Arous | National team Espérance de Tunis; Club Africain |
| 2. | | Stade Olympique de Sousse | 50,000 | 1973 (Renovated in 2019–2022) | Sousse, Sousse | Étoile Sportive du Sahel |

== Support ==
Twitter research from 2015 found that the most popular English Premier League club in Tunisia was Arsenal, with 33% of Tunisian Premier League fans following the club, followed by Chelsea (22%) and Manchester City (13%).

== Attendances ==
The average attendance per top-flight football league season and the club with the highest average attendance:

| Season | League average | Best club | Best club average |
|---|---|---|---|
| 2023-24 | 1,858 | Espérance Sportive de Tunis | 6,084 |

Source: League page on Wikipedia
