= Ramzi Hermassi =

Tunisian footballer

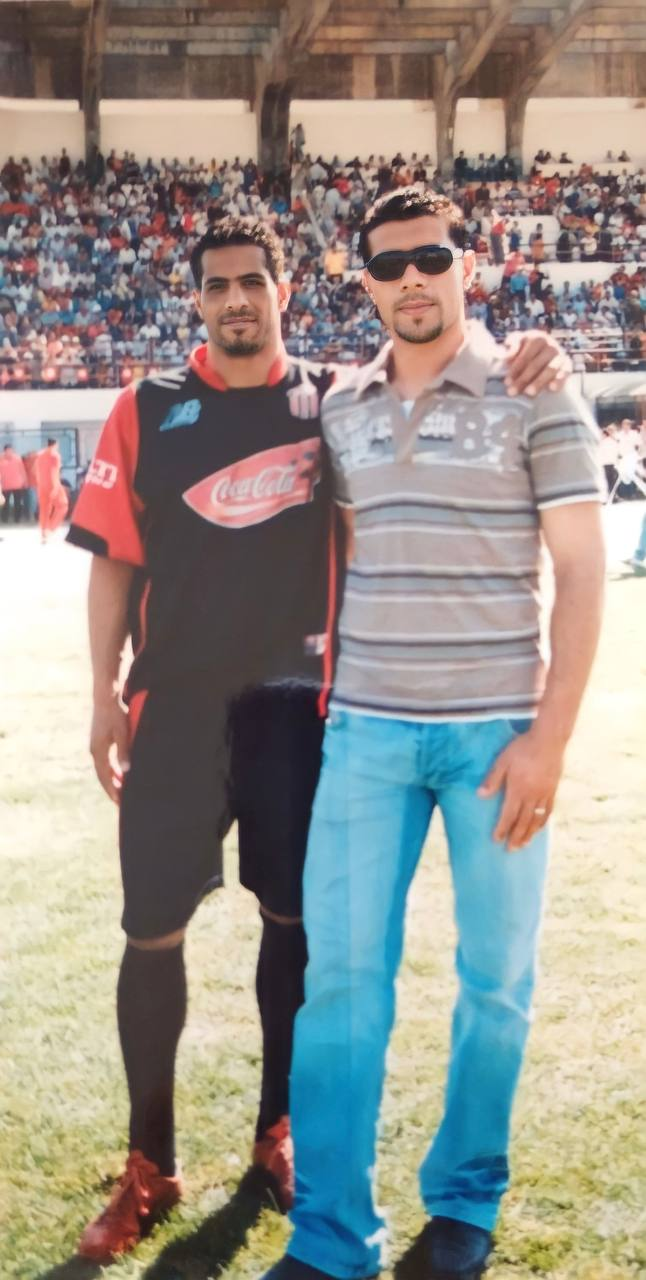

Personal information
- Date of birth: 8 March 1977 (age 49)
- Place of birth: Tunisia
- Height: 1.90 m (6 ft 3 in)
- Position: Striker

Senior career*
Years	Team	Apps	(Gls)
2000–2004	ES Fériana	50+	(25)
2004–2005	CS Hammam-Lif	22	(10)
2005–2006	ES Métlaoui	25	(30)
2006–2007	Jendouba Sport	18	(9)
2007–2008	El Makarem de Mahdia	25	(14)
2009–2010	Etihad Bouslim	19	(16)
2010–2011	US Sbeitla	27	(21)
2011-2012	ES El Jem	22	(18)
2013-	Manduria	27	(30)
- * Club domestic league appearances and goals

Ramzi Hermassi (8 March 1977 Tunisia), is a Tunisian professional footballer. He most recently played as a forward for Tunisia 1st division team Jendouba Sport.

== Club career ==
He begins to play among the professionals with the youth team of ES Feriana who play in the Tunisian second-level championship

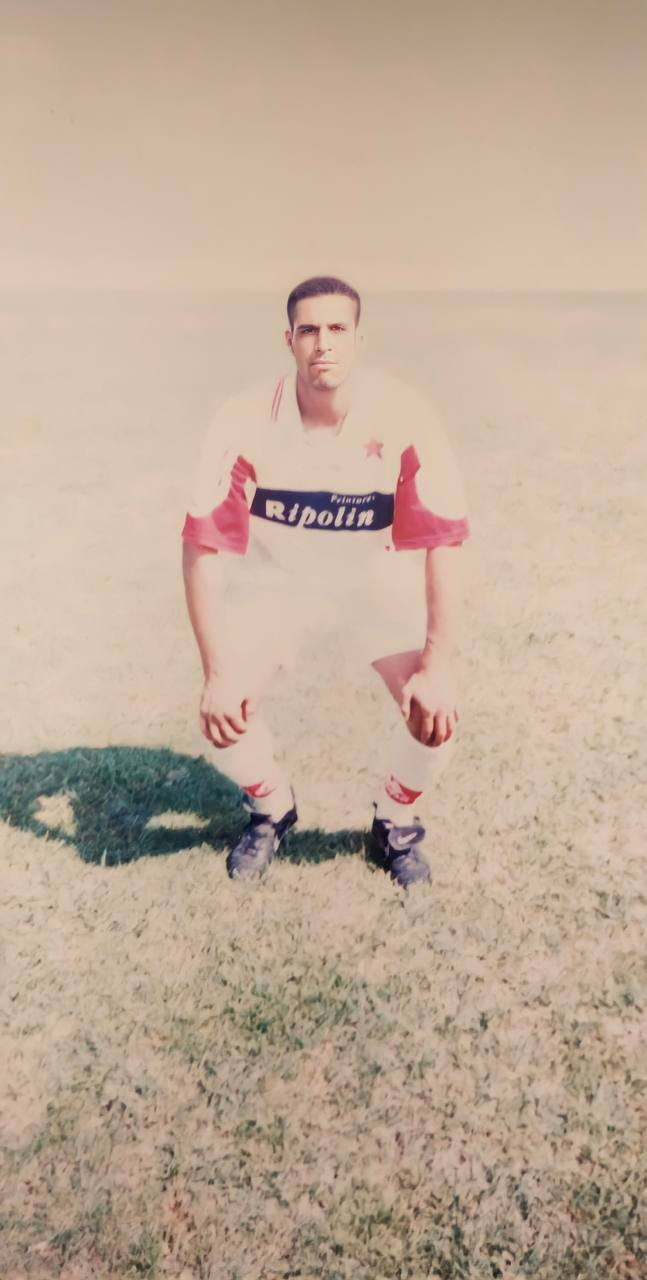
Hermassi playing for ES Feriana, 19 November 2000

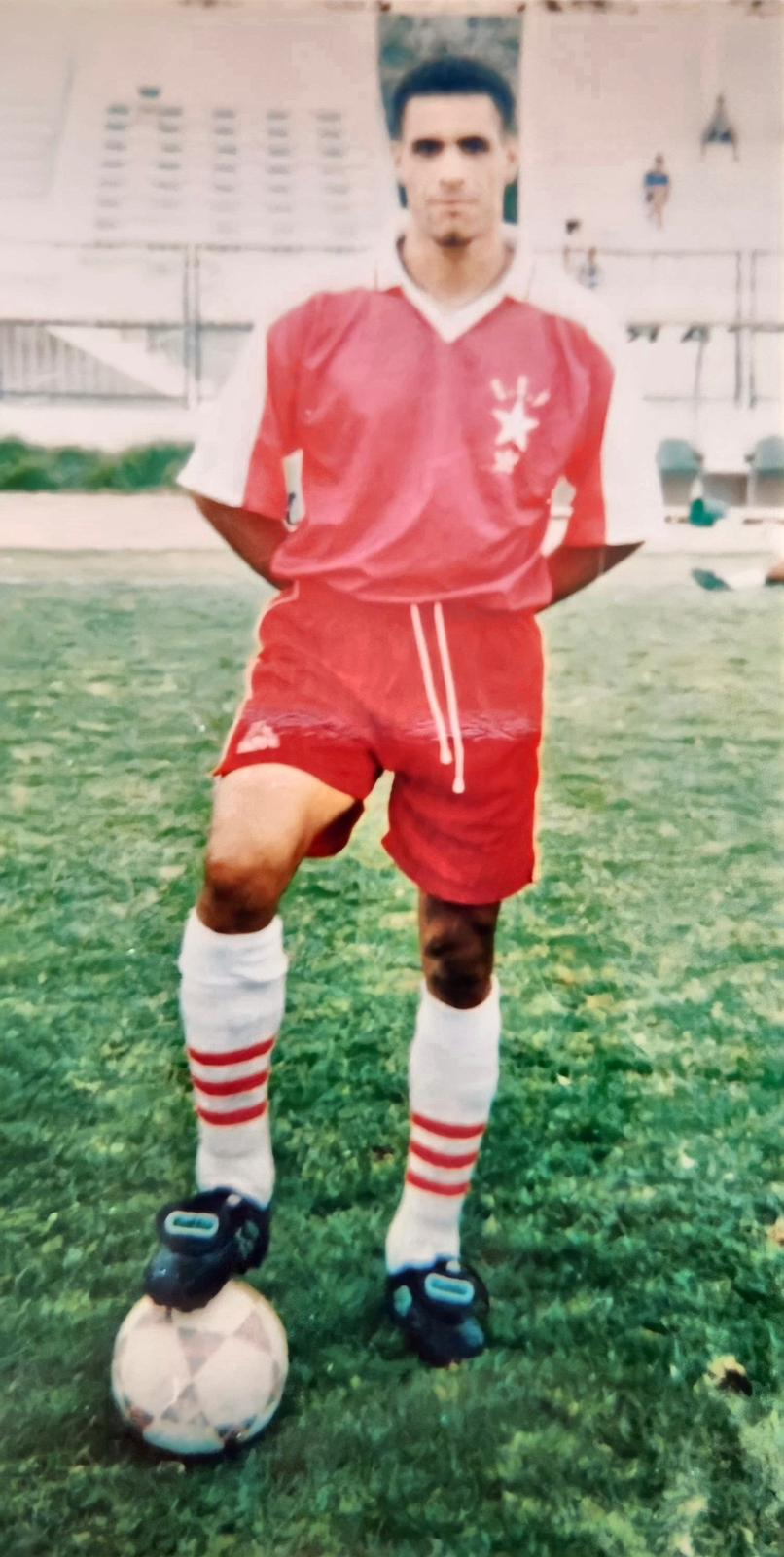
Hermassi playing for ES Feriana, 14 May 2000

In the 2005–2006 season he became the championship's top scorer and best player of the year with the Etoile Sportive Metlaoui

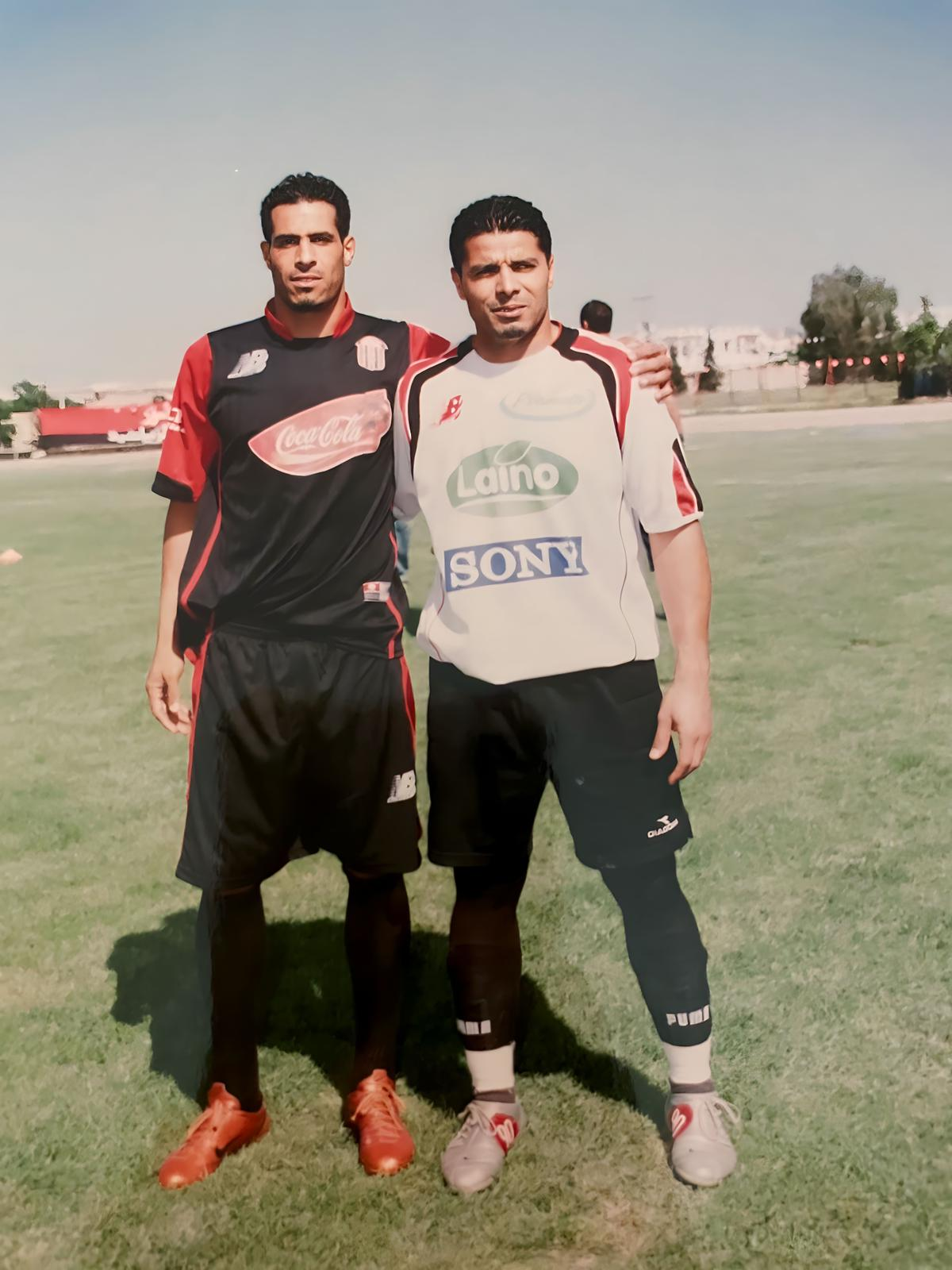
Ramzi Hermassi et le gardien Jendouba 2006
