= Patrick Liewig =

French football manager

Personal information
- Date of birth: 4 October 1950 (age 76)
- Place of birth: France

Managerial career
- Years: Team
- 2003-2009: ASEC Mimosas
- 2009-2011: Stade Tunisien
- 2012: MC Alger
- 2012: EGS Gafsa
- 2013: Simba Sports Club
- 2014: Grombalia Sports
- 2018-2019: West African Football Academy

Patrick Liewig (born 4 October 1950 in France) is a French football manager.
