= EL Kef Stadium =

Sports venue in El Kef, Tunisia

- Full name: Stade du Kef
- Location: El Kef, Tunisia
- Capacity: 9,000
- Surface: Grass

Tenant
- Olympique du Kef

EL Kef Stadium is a multi-use stadium in El Kef, Tunisia. It is the home ground of Olympique du Kef, and it has the capacity of 9,000.
