= Enfida Sports =

Tunisian football club

- Full name: Enfida Sports
- Founded: 1939
- Ground: Stade municipal Salah-Braiek; Enfidha, Tunisia
- Capacity: 2,500
- Chairman: Ali Ouaer
- Manager: Sofian Morjane
- League: Tunisian Ligue 4
Home colours	Away colours

Enfida Sports (النفيضة الرياضية) is a Tunisian football club located in Enfidha. It is currently evolving in the 2014–15 Tunisian Ligue Professionnelle 2.
