= SC Moknine =

Tunisian football club

- Full name: Sporting Club Moknine
- Founded: 6 November 1945
- Ground: Slim Ajmi Stadium
- Capacity: 5,000
- Chairman: Ameur Ben Halima
- League: Ligue 2
- 2023–24: Ligue 2, Group B, 4th of 14
Home colours	Away colours	Third colours

Sporting Club Moknine, (Arabic: سبورتينغ المكنين), known as SC Moknine or simply SCM for short, is a Tunisian football club based in Moknine. The club was founded on 6 November 1945 and its colours are red and white. Their home stadium, Slim Ajmi Stadium, has a capacity of 5,000 spectators. The club is currently playing in the Tunisian Ligue Professionnelle 2.

== League participations ==
- Tunisian Ligue Professionnelle 2: 2010–2013, 2022-Now
- Tunisian Ligue Professionnelle 3: ?-2010, 2013-2022

== Honours ==
- (Ligue III):2010
