= ES Jerba =

Tunisian football club

ES Jerba Midoun
- Full name: Espoir Sportif de Jerba Midoun
- Founded: 1974
- Ground: Midoun Municipal Stadium; Midoun, Tunisia
- Capacity: 10,000
- Chairman: (Tunisia) Zied Jamaï
- Manager: (Tunisia) Hatem Ounalli
- League: Ligue 2
Home colours	Away colours

Espoir Sportif de Jerba Midoun (Arabic: الأمل الرياضي بجربة ميدون, often referred to as ٍُESJM ) is a football club from Djerba in Tunisia. Founded in 1974, the team plays in white and blue colors. Their ground is the Midoun Municipal Stadium, which has a capacity of 10,000.

The club was relegated from League 2 to League 3 at the end of the 2007–08 season.

== Honours ==
- Tunisian Coupe de la Ligue Professionnelle: 1

2000/01

- Tunisian Coupe de la Ligue Professionnelle 2: 1

2006/07
