= Union Sportive de Sbeitla =

Tunisian football club

Union de Sbeitla
- Full name: Union Sportive de Sbeitla
- Founded: 1947
- Ground: Stade of Sbeitla, Tunisia
- Capacity: 2,500
- Chairman: Karim Hani
- Manager: Ounis Bouzidi
- League: Tunisian Ligue Professionnelle 3
- 2013–14: 1st
Home colours	Away colours

Union Sportive Sbeitla also known as USS, is a Tunisian football club, based in the city of Sbeitla in Tunisia. The club was founded in 1947. The team plays in red and white and plays its home matches at the Stade of Sbeitla, which has a seating capacity of 2500 spectators.

The team is currently playing in the Tunisian Third Football League. It was nominated for the first time in its history for the golden square of the Tunisian Cup on June 9, 2013, with JS Kairouan, CA Bizertin and Avenir Sportive de la Marsa, which are teams playing in the first Tunisian Professional Football League.
