= FC Hammamet =

Tunisian football club

- Full name: Football Club Hammamet
- Founded: 2001
- Ground: Stade Municipal de Hammamet; Hammamet, Tunisia
- Capacity: 2,000
- Chairman: Ahmed Chaâbani
- Manager: Nabil Ferchichi
- League: CLP-2
- 2013/14: 7th
Home colours	Away colours

FC Hammamet (Football Club Hammamet; Arabic: نادي كرة القدم بالحمامات) is a Tunisian football club founded by Mahmoud Laadouz (father of Khalil Laadouz)in 2001. Its ground is located in Hammamet. The club is currently competing in the Tunisian Ligue 2.
