= Grombalia Sport =

Tunisian football club

Grombalia
- Full name: Grombalia Sport
- Founded: 1939
- Ground: Stade municipal de Grombalia; Grombalia, Tunisia
- Capacity: 3,000
- Chairman: Hamadi Atrous
- Manager: Hassen Gabsi
- League: Tunisian Ligue Professionnelle 2
- 2013–14: 16th, (Relegated)
Home colours	Away colours

Grombalia Sport (Arabic: قرمبالية الرياضية) is a Tunisian football club, based in the city of Grombalia in northeast Tunisia. Founded in 1939, the team plays in white and blue colors.

The club currently plays in Tunisian Ligue Professionnelle 2.

== Stadium ==
Their ground is Stade municipal de Grombalia, which has a capacity of 3,000.

== League participations ==
- Tunisian Ligue Professionnelle 1: 2013–2014
- Tunisian Ligue Professionnelle 2: ????–2013

== Managers ==
- Mohsen Hamda (?;– July 19, 2012)
- Hassan Gabsi (Nov 14, 2012 – July 19, 2013)
- Robertinho (July 21, 2013 – Jan 8, 2014)
- Patrick Liewig (Jan 8, 2014 – Feb 16, 2014)
- Hassen Gabsi (Feb 17, 2014–)
