= US Tataouine =

Tunisian football club

- Full name: Union Sportive de Tataouine
- Nickname: Desert Felines/Desert Gust
- Founded: 1996
- Ground: Nejib Khattab Stadium
- Chairman: Akerma Wadhen
- Manager: Oussama Cherif
- League: Tunisian Ligue Professionnelle 2
- 2024–25: Ligue 1, 16th of 16 (relegated)
Home colours	Away colours

Union Sportive de Tataouine (Arabic: الاتحاد الرياضي بتطاوين), known as US Tataouine or simply UST for short, is a Tunisian football club based in Tataouine. The club was founded in 1996, after the merge of the two biggest football clubs in the city (Tataouine Sportive 1947 and Jeunesse Sportive Rogba 1976), and its colours red and blue. Their home stadium, Nejib Khattab Stadium, has a capacity of 5,000 spectators. The club is currently playing in the Tunisian Ligue Professionnelle 2.

== Current squad ==
As of 14 May 2025

Note: Flags indicate national team as defined under FIFA eligibility rules; some limited exceptions apply. Players may hold more than one non-FIFA nationality.

No.	Pos.	Nation	Player
2	DF	MLI	Mohamed Moussa Koita
3	DF	TUN	Helmi Ben Rhouma
4	DF	TUN	Rami Affas
5	DF	TUN	Adem Guizani
6	MF	TUN	Ghassen Khalfa
7	FW	TUN	Zied Ounalli
8	MF	TOG	Pedro Mevine
9	MF	CIV	Junior Diakite
10	MF	TUN	Ala Rhouma
11	FW	TUN	Wahid Timi
12	MF	TUN	Jasser Ghrabi
13	MF	TUN	Alaeddine Kartli
14	FW	SEN	Lamine Diakité
15	DF	TUN	Mohamed Amine Naoui
16	GK	TUN	Slim Rebaï
18	MF	TUN	Hamza Hammami
21	FW	NGR	Ibrahim Rasheed

No.	Pos.	Nation	Player
22	DF	TUN	Hazem Ben Hamed Mounadi
25	MF	TUN	Mohamed Jemai
27	MF	TUN	Seif Mhadhbi
28	FW	TUN	Mohamed Askri
29	FW	TUN	Hosni Guezmir
32	GK	TUN	Yassine Bguir
—	DF	TUN	Bilel Mgannem
—	FW	TUN	Hichem Amor
—	DF	TUN	Iheb Khefacha
—	DF	BEN	Irenée Glèlè
—	MF	MLI	Noumory Keïta
—	MF	SEN	Seydina Mouhamed Diouf
—	FW	SEN	Lamine Diatta
—	MF	TUN	Mohamed Ali Hosni
—	FW	ALG	Wail Harikeche
—	MF	FRA	Aymen Ben Achour
—	DF	TUN	Mohamed Amine Hentach (On loan to ES Rogba until 30 June)
