= CS M'saken =

Tunisian association football club

Croissant de M'saken
- Full name: Croissant Sportif de M'saken
- Nickname(s): Al Hilal
- Founded: July 21, 1945
- Ground: Municipal Stadium of M'saken; M'saken, Tunisia
- Capacity: 6,000
- Chairman: Slah Chatti
- Manager: Mohamed Berriri
- League: CLP-2
- 2019/20: 10th
Home colours	Away colours

Croissant Sportif de M'saken (Arabic: الهلال الرياضي بمساكن, often referred to as CSM), translated into "Crescent Sports of M'saken", is an omni-sport club based in the city of M'saken in Tunisia. Founded in 1945, the team plays in green and red colors.
The main sections of this sports club play football, handball and boxing. In the 1980s, there was also a section of Rugby team, which now is an independent team called "Association Sportive de M'saken" placed in the forefront of the national championship, the new team has also some sections of judo, athletics and women's handball.

== History ==
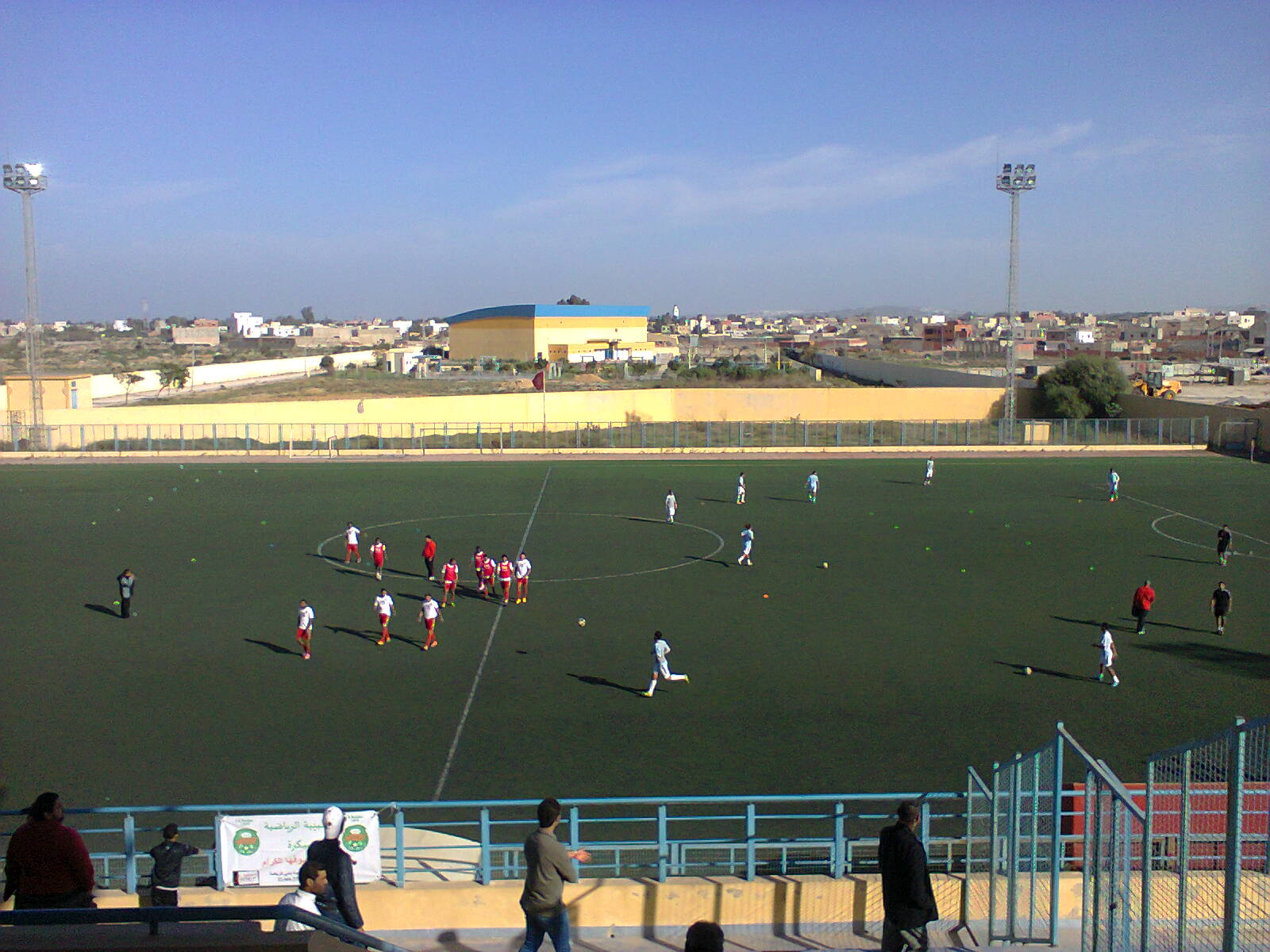
CS M'saken-AS Ariana match in December 2014.

The team reached the semi-finals of the President's Cup on April 23, 2006, beating the Stade Tunisien and becoming the first team from the Fourth division to reach such a level. During the past season the team has become a Tunisian football kind of phenomena by moving through four levels in four successive seasons. In May 2007 after beating the U.S. Sbeïtla the team moved to the CLP-2 where it is playing now.
