= SS Zarzouna =

Tunisian association football club in Bizerte

STIR S Zarzouna
- Full name: Stir Sportive de Zarzouna
- Founded: 1965
- Ground: Stade de Zarzouna; Zarzouna, Bizerte, Tunisia
- Capacity: 6,000
- League: Ligue 2
- 2007/08: 2nd Promoted from CLP-3
Home colours	Away colours

STIR Sportive de Zarzouna (Arabic: ستير الرياضية بجرزونة), known as SS Zarzouna, STIR Zarzouna or simply SSZ for short, is a Tunisian football club, based in the Zarzouna district in the city of Bizerte in northern Tunisia. The club was founded in 1965 and its colours are in Yellow, blue and white. Their home stadium, Zarzouna Stadium, has a capacity of 6,000 spectators. The club is currently playing in the Tunisian Ligue Professionnelle 3.
