= Tunisian Ligue Professionnelle 2 =

Association football league in Tunisia

- Organising body: Tunisian Football Federation; National Professional Football League
- Founded: 1921; 105 years ago
- Country: Tunisia
- Confederation: CAF
- Number of clubs: 28
- Level on pyramid: 2
- Promotion to: Ligue Professionnelle 1
- Relegation to: Ligue 3
- Domestic cup: Tunisian Cup
- Current champions: PS Sakiet Eddaïer (1st title) (2025–26)
- Most championships: CO Transports (7 titles)
- Broadcaster(s): Diwan Sport
- Website: Official Website
- Current: 2026–27 Tunisian Ligue Professionnelle 2

The Tunisian Ligue Professionnelle 2, formerly known as the Tunisian National Championship 2 (1955–1994), is the second highest-level football competition in Tunisia and is organised by the Tunisian Football Federation (FTF) and the National Professional Football League (LNFP).

The league consists of 28 teams divided into two groups of fourteen, who play each other in a home-and-away format. The top team in each group is automatically promoted to Tunisian Ligue Professionnelle 1 and then plays a decisive match to determine the season's champion. The teams finishing 13th and 14th in each group are relegated to Tunisian Ligue 3.

During the past few years the name of the competition has changed several times, with the league being known as the Honor division or National B. The Club Olympique des Transports is the most decorated with seven titles, while PS Sakiet Eddaïer is the title holder for the 2025–26 season.

== History ==
Originally, the league was played in two groups, the northern and southern groups, the winners of which qualified for promotion to the Ligue Professionnelle 1. Exceptionally, in the 1958–59 season, the teams were divided into a total of four different groups. Despite this, winning the group did not really matter, only the two best teams with the most points advanced. The two-group system continued until the 1964–65 season, until the next five seasons from 1965 to 1970, only a single league was played, in which the top two teams in the league advanced to the Ligue Professionnelle 1.

The 1982–83, 1983–84 and 1984–85 seasons were played in three different groups, the northern, central and southern groups, of which the top two group winners advanced to the main league. The system then reverted to a single league until the 1994–95 season, after which a single season was played in a two-division system. In addition, in the 1998–99 season, teams were unable to qualify for the main league, which reduced the number of teams in the main league from 16 to 12. Since the 1999–2000 season, Ligue Professionnelle 2 has been played as a single league. The most championships in history have been won by Club Olympique des Transports. It has won Ligue Professionnelle 2 seven times, only once in the 1982–83 season when it failed to advance to the main league.

== Format ==
Former Tunisian Ligue Professionnelle 2 logo

In the current format of two groups of 14 clubs each, the rules are as follows:

- Promotion to Ligue Professionnelle 1: The top-ranked teams from each group (usually the first or two) are promoted directly or via playoffs. A final often pits the winners of the two groups against each other to determine the Ligue Professionnelle 2 champion, an honorary title. Typically, two teams are promoted per season.
- Relegation to Ligue 3: The bottom-ranked teams from each group (usually the bottom two or three) are relegated, for a total of three to four relegations depending on the season and adjustments.

== Media coverage ==
The broadcasting rights for Ligue Professionnelle 2 until the end of the 2009–10 season were awarded to Hannibal TV for 150,000 dinars.

In September 2025, the Tunisian Football Federation indicated that the broadcasting rights for the 2025–26 season had not yet been sold, allowing clubs to broadcast their home matches themselves via their digital platforms. In October, an agreement was reached between the Federation and Diwan Sport for the broadcasting (including digital) of Ligue Professionnelle 2. In November, an agreement was signed with the Télévision Tunisienne for the rights to Tunisian football (primarily Ligue Professionnelle 1, but also the best Ligue Professionnelle 2 matches) for the 2025–26, 2026–27, and 2027–28 seasons.

A large number of Ligue Professionnelle 2 matches are also streamed by the clubs via their official channels (YouTube and Facebook), while the Diwan Sport platform provides additional digital coverage (live and highlights) for both professional divisions.

=== Broadcasting rights ===
Tunisian Ligue Professionnelle 2 Media Coverage
Country	Television Channel	Matches
Tunisia	Diwan Sport	All Matches

== Seasons ==
The list below includes the winners of the Tunisian second division championship (Ligue Professionnelle 2). In multi-group formats, several champions are sometimes determined by region or via playoffs. Since the late 1980s (and consolidated in the 2000s), a single champion is generally proclaimed (often with a final between the group winners).

Season	Champions	Group
1955–56	JS Métouia	North
1955–56	Stade Soussien	Centre-South
1955–56	ES Métlaoui	South-West
1956–57	US Tunis	North
1956–57	Stade Soussien	Centre-South
1956–57	ES Métlaoui	South-West
1957–58	Olympique du Kef	North (2^{e} place)
1957–58	Stade Gabèsien	Centre-South
1957–58	Khanfous Club de Redeyef	South-West
1958–59	USM Olympique	North 1
1958–59	AS Marsa	North 2
1958–59	JS Kairouan	Centre-South
1958–59	ES Métlaoui	South-West
1959–60	MC Hammam-Lif	North
1959–60	El Makarem de Mahdia	South
1960–61	MC Hammam-Lif	North
1960–61	Stade Gabèsien	South
1961–62	El Ahly Mateur	North
1961–62	ES Métlaoui	South
1962–63	CA Bizertin	North
1962–63	Sfax RS	South
1963–64	CS Hammam-Lif	North
1963–64	SS Sfaxien	South
1964–65	Club Olympique des Transports	–
1965–66	CS Cheminots	–
1966–67	Club Olympique des Transports	–
1967–68	CS Cheminots	–
1968–69	AS d'Ariana	–
1969–70	El Makarem de Mahdia	–
1970–71	US Maghrébine	North
1970–71	SS Sfaxien	South
1971–72	CS Hammam-Lif	North
1971–72	JS Kairouan	South
1972–73	CS Cheminots	North
1972–73	SS Sfaxien	South
1973–74	SA Menzel Bourguiba	North
1973–74	Patriote de Sousse	South
1974–75	Olympique du Kef	North
1974–75	JS Kairouan	South
1975–76	Association Mégrine Sport	North
1975–76	US Monastir	South
1976–77	SA Menzel Bourguiba	North
1976–77	SS Sfaxien	South
1977–78	Olympique du Kef	North
1977–78	OC Kerkennah	South
1978–79	CS Menzel Bouzelfa	North
1978–79	Stade Gabèsien	South
1979–80	Club Olympique des Transports	North
1979–80	US Monastir	South
1980–81	Association Mégrine Sport	North
1980–81	El Makarem de Mahdia	South
1981–82	CS Korba	North
1981–82	Stade Gabèsien	South
1982–83	Club Olympique des Transports	North
1982–83	SS Sfaxien	South
1982–83	Stade Soussien	Centre
1983–84	Club Olympique des Transports	North
1983–84	Stade Nabeulien	Centre
1983–84	AS Gabès	South
1984–85	Olympique Béja	North
1984–85	STIA Sousse	Centre
1984–85	OC Kerkennah	South
1985–86	Club Olympique des Transports	–
1986–87	Olympique du Kef	–
1987–88	AS Marsa	–
1988–89	CS Cheminots	–
1989–90	CA Bizertin	–
1990–91	OC Kerkennah	–
1991–92	AS Kasserine	–
1992–93	Olympique du Kef	–
1993–94	Sfax RS	–
1994–95	Club Olympique des Transports	–
1995–96	Stade Soussien	–
1996–97	CS Hammam-Lif	–
1997–98	US Monastir	–
1998–99	No teams promoted (Reduction of Ligue Professionnelle 1 from 16 to 12)	

From the late 1980s (and further solidified in the 2000s), the league evolved towards a format with a single champion per season (an honorary title, often decided by a final or playoff), even though several teams were promoted through the group stage standings. This evolution aimed in particular to:

- Simplify the competition and the standings;
- Harmonize Ligue Professionnelle 2 with the professional Ligue Professionnelle 1 (from 1994);
- Improve clarity for fans and media coverage (limited but increasing coverage for the finals).

The table below presents the modern rankings since the 2000–01 season, with single champions and finalists/scores when a final is played.

Season	Champion	2nd place and 3rd place / Runner-up	Result
2000–01	CO Médenine	Club Olympique des Transports	Co-promoted
2001–02	AS Djerba	AS Marsa	Co-promoted
2002–03	ES Beni-Khalled	Club Olympique des Transports	Co-promoted
2003–04	EO La Goulette et du Kram	EGS Gafsa / ES Zarzis	Co-promoted
2004–05	Jendouba Sport	JS Kairouan	Co-promoted
2005–06	Olympique Béja	ES Hammam Sousse	Co-promoted
2006–07	Stade Gabèsien	Jendouba Sport	Co-promoted
2007–08	ES Hammam Sousse	AS Kasserine	Co-promoted
2008–09	ES Zarzis	JS Kairouan	Co-promoted
2009–10	AS Marsa	AS Gabès	Co-promoted
2010–11	US Monastir	ES Beni-Khalled	Co-promoted
2011–12	Olympique du Kef	Stade Gabèsien	Co-promoted
2012–13	ES Métlaoui	Grombalia Sport / LPST Tozeur	Co-promoted
2013–14	AS Djerba	AS Gabès / ES Zarzis	Co-promoted
2014–15	US Ben Guerdane	AS Kasserine / Olympique Sidi Bouzid	Co-promoted
2015–16	AS Gabès	US Tataouine / Olympique Béja	Co-promoted
2016–17	Stade Tunisien	US Monastir	Co-promoted
2017–18	CS Hammam-Lif	US Tataouine	Co-promoted
2018–19	AS Soliman (group 1)	No runner-up	Co-champions/play-off
2018–19	CS Chebba (group 2)	No runner-up	Co-champions/play-off
2019–20	Olympique Béja	No runner-up	Co-promoted
2019–20	AS Rejiche	No runner-up	Co-promoted
2020–21	CS Hammam-Lif	ES Hammam Sousse	2–2 (5–4 p) (Co-promoted)
2021–22	Stade Tunisien	Olympique Sidi Bouzid	2–2 (4–3 p) (Co-promoted)
2022–23	EGS Gafsa	AS Marsa	2–2 (4–2 p) (Co-promoted)
2023–24	JS El Omrane	ES Zarzis	2–1 (Co-promoted)
2024–25	AS Marsa	JS Kairouan	3–1 (Co-promoted)
2025–26	PS Sakiet Eddaïer	ES Hammam Sousse	3–2 (Co-promoted)
