= Olympique du Kef =

Tunisian football club

- Full name: Olympique du Kef
- Founded: 17 May 1922
- Ground: Stade du Kef; El Kef, Tunisia
- Capacity: 9,000
- Manager: Seif Ghezal
- League: CLP-2
Home colours	Away colours

Olympique du Kef (Arabic: أولمبيك الكاف), is a Tunisian football club, based in the city of El Kef in northwest Tunisia. Founded in 1922 as Etoile Sportive du Kef, the team plays in red, white and black colors. Their ground is Stade du Kef, which has a capacity of 9,000.

Games against neighboring clubs Jendouba Sport and Olympique Béja are considered the most important Derbys for Olympique Kef.

== Achievements ==
=== Performance in national leagues ===
- Tunisian Ligue Professionnelle 2: 6

1958, 1975, 1978, 1987, 1993, 2012

- Tunisian Ligue Professionnelle 3 (Division North) : 1

2006

=== Performance in national cup ===
- Tunisian Cup: 0

Best performance: Semifinal in 1996
