= US Ben Guerdane =

Tunisian association football club

- Full name: Union Sportive de Ben Guerdane
- Nickname: The Cavaliers
- Short name: USBG
- Founded: 1 March 1936 (90 years ago)
- Ground: 7 March Stadium
- Capacity: 10,000
- Chairman: Chahreddine Aoun
- Manager: Sofiène Hidoussi
- League: Tunisian Ligue Professionnelle 1
- 2025–26: Ligue 1, 10th of 16
Home colours	Away colours	Third colours

Union Sportive de Ben Guerdane (Arabic: الاتحاد الرياضي ببن قردان), known as US Ben Guerdane or simply USBG, is a Tunisian football club, based in the city of Ben Guerdane in southeast Tunisia. The club was founded in 1936 and its colours are yellow and black. Their home stadium, 7 March Stadium, has a capacity of 10,000 spectators. The club is currently playing in the Tunisian Ligue Professionnelle 1.

They managed to reach for the first time in its history in Tunisian Professional League 1 during the season 2015.

== Honours and achievements ==
National
- Tunisian Cup (0) :
  - Finalist : 2016–17
  - Semi-finalist : 2021–22, 2024–25
- CLP-2 (1)
  - Winners : 2014–15
- CLP-3 (2)
  - Winners : 1963–64, 2007–08
- CLP-4 (2)
  - Winners : 1987–88, 2006–07
- CLP-5 (1)
  - Winners : 2002–03
- Coupe de la Ligue amateur Promosport (1)
  - Winners : 2006–07

== Current squad ==
As of 13 January 2025

Note: Flags indicate national team as defined under FIFA eligibility rules; some limited exceptions apply. Players may hold more than one non-FIFA nationality.

No.	Pos.	Nation	Player
2	MF	TUN	Iyadh Akrout
3	DF	TUN	Adem Taous
4	DF	TUN	Skander Labidi
5	DF	TUN	Zied Machmoum
6	MF	TUN	Jassem Bouabcha
7	MF	TUN	Ayoub Chaabane
8	MF	CIV	Presnel Banga
9	FW	TUN	Adem Ben Ahmed
10	MF	TUN	Ayoub Ben Mcharek
11	FW	TUN	Nassim Sioud
13	GK	CMR	Junior Bida
14	DF	TUN	amenallah ben hassan
15	MF	CGO	Amour Loussoukou

No.	Pos.	Nation	Player
16	GK	TUN	Mohamed Abbassi
17	FW	SEN	Elhadji Omar Fall
18	FW	TUN	Iyed Belwafi
19	MF	TUN	Mohamed Nasr Hamed
20	FW	TUN	Houssem Habbassi
22	GK	TUN	Noureddine Farhati
25	DF	TUN	Siraj Helal
26	DF	TUN	Iyed Touis
28	DF	TUN	Rayane Chaibi
29	DF	TUN	Ghazi Abderrazzak
33	MF	TUN	Oussema Amri
34	FW	TUN	Ammar Ltaief
