= SA Menzel Bourguiba =

Tunisian football club

- Full name: Stade Africain de Menzel Bourguiba
- Founded: 1938; 88 years ago
- Ground: Stade Azaiez Jaballah; Menzel Bourguiba, Tunisia
- Capacity: 6,500
- Chairman: Taoufik Ouali
- Manager: Chakib Mhaouich
- League: Ligue 2
Home colours	Away colours

Stade Africain de Menzel Bourguiba (Arabic: الملعب الإفريقي بمنزل بورقيبة), often referred to as SAMB is a football club from Menzel Bourguiba in Tunisia. Founded in 1938, the team plays in green and white colors. Their ground is the Stade Azaiez Jaballah, which has a capacity of 6,500.

The team used to be called Union Sportive Ferryville (USF) as the city of Menzel Bourguiba used to be Ferryville.

== Honours ==
- Tunisian League 2 : 2

1973-74, 1976–77

- Tunisian Cup : 1

1941-42 (as US Ferryville)
