= AS d'Ariana =

Tunisian football club

AS Ariana
- Full name: Association Sportive d'Ariana
- Founded: 1938; 88 years ago
- Ground: Ariana Municipal Stadium
- Capacity: 7,000
- League: Ligue 2
- 2023–24: Ligue 2, Group A, 6th of 14
| Home colours | Away colours | Third colours |

Association Sportive d'Ariana (Arabic: الجمعية الرياضية بأريانة), known as AS Ariana or simply ASA for short, is a Tunisian football club based in Aryanah. The club was founded in 1938, and its colours are black and white. Their home stadium, Ariana Municipal Stadium, has a capacity of 7,000 spectators. The club is currently playing in the Tunisian Ligue Professionnelle 2. For the 2024/25 season they ranked twelfth out of fourteen teams in Group A. In 2025/26 they ranked fourth of fourteen teams in Group B.
