= AS Djerba =

Tunisian football club

Association de Djerba
- Full name: Association Sportive de Djerba
- Founded: 1946
- Ground: Stade de Houmet Es'Souk; Djerba, Tunisia
- Capacity: 12,000
- Manager: Riad Dhoubib
- League: Ligue 3
Home colours	Away colours

Association Sportive de Djerba (Arabic: االجمعية الرياضية بجربة, often referred to as ASD) is a football club based in Houmet Es'Souk, Djerba in Tunisia. Founded in 1946 when Jilani Anane was its first president, the team plays in white and green colors. Their ground is Stade Houmet Es'Souk, which has a capacity of 12,000.

== Managers ==
- (Tunisia) Abdelhay Ben Soltane (5 Aug 2014–)
