= ES Hammam Sousse =

Association football club in Tunisia

- Full name: Espoir Sportif de Hammam Sousse
- Founded: 1954; 72 years ago
- Ground: Bou Ali Lahouar Stadium
- Capacity: 6,500
- Chairman: Noureddine Boujnah
- Manager: Chiheb Ellili
- League: Ligue 1
- 2025–26: Ligue 2, Group A, 1th of 14
Home colours	Away colours

Espoir Sportif de Hammam Sousse (Arabic: الأمل الرياضي بحمام سوسة), known as ES Hammam Sousse or simply ESHS for short, is a Tunisian football club based in Hammam Sousse. The club was founded in 1954 and its colours are yellow and black. Their home stadium, Bou Ali Lahouar Stadium has a capacity of 6,500 spectators. The club is currently playing in the Tunisian Ligue Professionnelle 1.
