= Tunisian Ligue 3 =

- Founded: 1956
- Country: Tunisia
- Confederation: CAF
- Number of clubs: 42
- Level on pyramid: 3
- Promotion to: Tunisian Ligue Professionnelle 2
- Relegation to: Tunisian Ligue Amateur 4
- Domestic cup: Tunisian Cup
- Website: https://www.ftf.org.tn
- Current: 2025-26 Ligue 3

The Tunisian Ligue 3 is the 3rd tier of football in Tunisia. organized and managed by the Ligue nationale de football amateur 42 teams compete at this level, divided into 3 groups of 14 teams each.

== 2016–17 clubs ==
=== Group 1 ===
- Ahly Mateur
- AS Metline
- Association Mégrine Sport
- AS Mhamdia
- AS Oued Ellil
- AS Soukra
- CO Transports
- ES Radès
- JS El Omrane
- Mouldia Manouba
- Stir Sportive Zarzouna
- VS Menzel Abderrahmane

=== Group 2 ===
- AS Jelma
- AS Barnoussa
- AS Soliman
- CS Makthar
- Dahmani AC
- ES Haffouz
- ES Beni-Khalled
- ES Fahs
- ES Oueslatia
- RS Sbiba
- US Bousalem
- US Sbeitla

=== Group 3 ===
- Ahly Bouhjar
- AS Rejiche
- CS Bembla
- CS Hergla
- CS Hilalien
- CS Chebba
- El Makarem de Mahdia
- HS Kalâa Kebira
- Kalâa Sport
- Sporting Club Moknine
- Stade Soussien
- US Ksour Essef

=== Group 4 ===
- CS Jbeniana
- CS Redeyef
- Espoir Sportif de Jerba Midoun
- ES El Jem
- ES Feriana
- FS Ksar Gafsa
- LPS Tozeur
- Océano Club de Kerkennah
- PS Sakiet Daier
- US Métouia
- Wydad El Hamma
- ZS Chammakh
