= List of Tunisian Ligue Professionnelle 1 top scorers =

Following Tunisian independence, the newspaper Le Petit Matin took on the task of compiling the top-scorer rankings for the Tunisian Ligue Professionnelle 1. In 1961, the newspaper Al Amal took over this role; subsequently, L'Action Tunisienne (in collaboration with the weekly Le Sport) formalized the rankings and starting in 1967 introduced an associated award. As media coverage of Tunisian Ligue Professionnelle 1 matches expanded, these rankings gained greater prominence.

== Seasons and top-scorer ==
The player won the Tunisian Golden Boot (1969–1995)

Seasons	Player	Club	Goals
1955–56	(Tunisia) Habib Mougou	Étoile du Sahel	25
1956–57	(Tunisia) Brahim Ben Miled	JS Métouia	20
1957–58	(Tunisia) Habib Mougou (Tunisia) Boubaker Haddad	Étoile du Sahel CA Bizertin	28
1958–59	(Tunisia) Abdelmajid Tlemçani	Espérance de Tunis	32
1959–60	(Tunisia) Abdelmajid Tlemçani	Espérance de Tunis	22
1960–61	(Tunisia) Ammar Merrichkou	AS Marsa	18
1961–62	(Tunisia) Chedly Laaouini	Espérance de Tunis	16
1962–63	(Tunisia) Mokhtar Chelbi	AS Marsa	16
1963–64	(Tunisia) Mongi Dalhoum	CS Sfaxien	15
1964–65	(Tunisia) Mohamed Salah Jedidi	Club Africain	17
1965–66	(Tunisia) Mongi Dalhoum	CS Sfaxien	18
1966–67	(Tunisia) Abdelwahab Lahmar	Stade Tunisien	14
1967–68	(Tunisia) Kamel Henia	CS Hammam-Lif	10
1968–69	(Tunisia) Mohamed Salah Jedidi	Club Africain	17
1969–70	(Tunisia) Othman Jenayah	Étoile du Sahel	17
1970–71	(Tunisia) Abdesselam Adhouma	Étoile du Sahel	24
1971–72	(Tunisia) Moncef Khouini	Club Africain	12
1972–73	(Tunisia) Ezzedine Chakroun	Sfax RS	23
1973–74	(Tunisia) Abdesselam Adhouma	Étoile du Sahel	16
1974–75	(Tunisia) Zoubeir Boughnia	Espérance de Tunis	24
1975–76	(Tunisia) Abderraouf Ben Aziza	Étoile du Sahel	20
1976–77	(Tunisia) Moncef Ouada	JS Kairouan	16
1977–78	(Tunisia) Abderraouf Ben Aziza	Étoile du Sahel	20
1978–79	(Tunisia) Mahmoud Tebourski	Olympique du Kef	13
1979–80	(Tunisia) Hédi Bayari	Club Africain	14
1980–81	(Tunisia) Habib Gasmi	Club Africain	16
1981–82	(Tunisia) Riadh El Fahem	Espérance de Tunis	13
1982–83	(Tunisia) Hédi Bayari	Club Africain	17
1983–84	(Tunisia) Hédi Bayari	Club Africain	12
1984–85	(Tunisia) Faouzi Henchiri	CO Transports	9
1985–86	(Tunisia) Nabil Tasco	CS Hammam-Lif	12
1986–87	(Tunisia) Adnène Laajili	US Monastir	14
1987–88	(Tunisia) Nabil Maâloul	Espérance de Tunis	14
1988–89	(Tunisia) Abdelhamid Hergal	Stade Tunisien	15
1989–90	(Tunisia) Faouzi Rouissi	Club Africain	18
1990–91	(Tunisia) Fethi Chehaibi (Bargou)	JS Kairouan	19
1991–92	(Tunisia) Hechmi Sassi (Tunisia) Amor Ben Tahar	Stade Tunisien OC Kerkennah	14
1992–93	(Tunisia) Abdelkader Ben Hassen (Zambia) Kenneth Malitoli	CA Bizertin Espérance de Tunis	18
1993–94	(Zambia) Kenneth Malitoli	Espérance de Tunis	14
1994–95	(Tunisia) Belhassen Aloui	CS Hammam-Lif	18
1995–96	(Tunisia) Sami Touati	Club Africain	17
1996–97	(Tunisia) Sami Laaroussi	Espérance de Tunis	14
1997–98	(Tunisia) Abdelkader Ben Hassen (Tunisia) Ziad Tlemçani	CA Bizertin Espérance de Tunis	15
1998–99	(Brazil) Francileudo Santos	Étoile du Sahel	14
1999–2000	(Tunisia) Ali Zitouni	Espérance de Tunis	19
2000–01	(Tunisia) Oussama Sellami	Stade Tunisien	11
2001–02	(Ivory Coast) Kandia Traoré	Espérance de Tunis	13
2002–03	(Tunisia) Mohamed Selliti	Stade Tunisien	12
2003–04	(Tunisia) Nabil Missaoui (Tunisia) Haykel Guemamdia (Mali) Tenema N'Diaye	Club Africain CS Sfaxien CS Sfaxien	9
2004–05	(Tunisia) Haykel Guemamdia	CS Sfaxien	12
2005–06	(Tunisia) Amine Ltifi	Espérance de Tunis	16
2006–07	(Tunisia) Tarek Ziadi	CS Sfaxien	13
2007–08	(Tunisia) Wissem Ben Yahia	Club Africain	10
2008–09	(Nigeria) Michael Eneramo	Espérance de Tunis	18
2009–10	(Nigeria) Michael Eneramo	Espérance de Tunis	13
2010–11	(Tunisia) Ahmed Akaïchi	Étoile du Sahel	14
2011–12	(Tunisia) Youssef Msakni	Espérance de Tunis	17
2012–13	(Algeria) Abdelmoumene Djabou (Tunisia) Haythem Jouini	Club Africain Espérance de Tunis	8
2013–14	(Algeria) Baghdad Bounedjah	Étoile du Sahel	14
2014–15	(Tunisia) Saber Khalifa	Club Africain	15
2015–16	(Tunisia) Ali Maâloul	CS Sfaxien	16
2016–17	(Tunisia) Taha Yassine Khenissi	Espérance de Tunis	14
2017–18	(Tunisia) Alaeddine Marzouki (Tunisia) Lassaâd Jaziri	CS Sfaxien US Ben Guerdane	10
2018–19	(Tunisia) Taha Yassine Khenissi (Tunisia) Firas Chaouat	Espérance de Tunis CS Sfaxien	10
2019–20	(Nigeria) Anthony Okpotu	US Monastir	13
2020–21	(Tunisia) Aymen Sfaxi	Étoile du Sahel	9
2021–22	(Tunisia) Mohamed Ali Ben Hammouda	Espérance de Tunis	10
2022–23	(Tunisia) Rafik Kamergi	US Ben Guerdane	14
2023–24	(Mali) Boubacar Traoré (Tunisia) Taieb Ben Zitoun (Brazil) Rodrigo Rodrigues	US Monastir CA Bizertin Espérance de Tunis	10
2024–25	(Tunisia) Firas Chaouat	Étoile du Sahel	17
2025–26	(Tunisia) Firas Chaouat	Club Africain	15

== Statistics ==
=== All-time top scorers ===
Rank	Players	Goals	Clubs
1	(Tunisia) Ezzedine Chakroun	116	Sfax Railways Sports
2	(Tunisia) Hédi Bayari	110	Club Africain
3	(Tunisia) Tarak Dhiab	107	Espérance de Tunis
4	(Tunisia) Habib Mougou	99	Étoile du Sahel
5	(Tunisia) Mohamed Salah Jedidi	98	Club Africain
6	(Tunisia) Adel Sellimi	90	Club Africain
7	(Tunisia) Abdelkader Ben Hassen	89	Olympique des Transports (44), Espérance de Tunis (12), Club Bizertin (33)
8	(Tunisia) Abdelmajid Tlemçani	88	Espérance de Tunis
9	(Tunisia) Abdelhamid Hergal	85	Stade Tunisien
10	(Tunisia) Nabil Bechaouch	82	Olympique Béja (71), Stade Tunisien (8), Club Sfaxien (3)
11	(Tunisia) Moncef Khouini	81	Club Africain
11	(Tunisia) Sami Touati	81	Club Africain (80), Stade Tunisien (1)
12	(Tunisia) Mongi Dalhoum	80	Club Sfaxien
13	(Tunisia) Abderraouf Ben Aziza	79	Étoile du Sahel (70), Club de Hammam-Lif (9)
14	(Tunisia) Faouzi Rouissi	78	Club Africain
14	(Tunisia) Noureddine Diwa	78	Stade Tunisien (75), Espérance de Tunis (3)
14	(Tunisia) Abdesselem Chemam	78	Avenir de Marsa
15	(Tunisia) Mohamed Akid	77	Club Sfaxien
16	(Tunisia) Hamadi Agrebi	75	Club Sfaxien
16	(Tunisia) Mohieddine Habita	75	Olympique des Transports
17	(Tunisia) Saâd Karmous	74	Club de Hammam-Lif (72), US Tunis (2)
18	(Tunisia) Moncef Chérif	71	Stade Tunisien
18	(Tunisia) Moncef Ouada	71	Jeunesse Kairouanaise
19	(Tunisia) Jameleddine Limam	70	Stade Tunisien (49), Club Africain (21)

=== By club ===
Titles	Club
20	Espérance de Tunis
14	Club Africain
12	Étoile du Sahel
9	CS Sfaxien
5	Stade Tunisien
4	Club Bizertin
3	CS Hammam-Lif
2	AS Marsa
2	JS Kairouan
2	US Monastir
2	US Ben Guerdane
1	Sfax RS
1	CO Transports
1	Olympique du Kef
1	OC Kerkennah
1	JS Métouia
1	AS Soliman

=== By country ===
Titles	Country
71	Tunisia
3	Nigeria
2	Zambia, Algeria
1	Brazil, Ivory Coast, Mali
