= List of Tunisian Ligue Professionnelle 1 winning managers =

This is a list of Tunisian Ligue Professionnelle 1 winning football managers post-independence. Over the course of 72 seasons, 40 coaches have managed to win the title. The English Bill Berry was the first coach to win the title; he achieved this with the CS Hammam-Lif during the 1955–56 season.

Faouzi Benzarti has won the tournament on a record eleven occasions with Espérance de Tunis, Étoile du Sahel and Club Africain.

== Seasons and winning managers ==
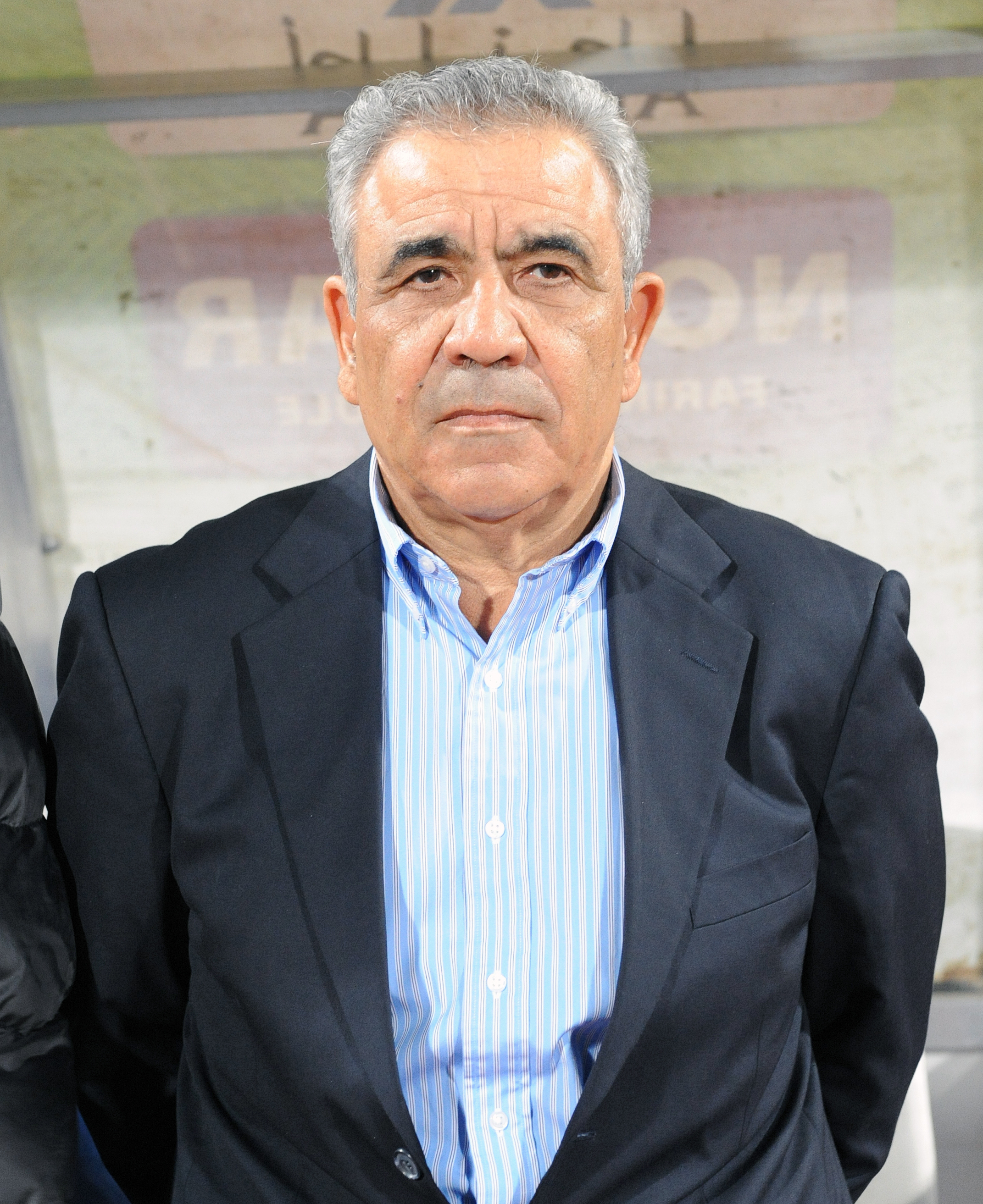
Faouzi Benzarti won the Tunisian Ligue Professionnelle 1 a record eleven times with Espérance de Tunis, Étoile du Sahel and Club Africain.

Season	Country	Winning manager	Club	Ref
1955–56	England	George Berry	CS Hammam-Lif	
1956–57	Algeria	Habib Draoua	Stade Tunisien	
1957–58	England	George Berry (2)	Étoile du Sahel	
1958–59	Tunisia	Hechmi Cherif	Espérance de Tunis	
1959–60	Algeria	Habib Draoua (2)	Espérance de Tunis	
1960–61	Algeria	Habib Draoua (3)	Stade Tunisien	
1961–62	Tunisia	Rachid Turki	Stade Tunisien	
1962–63	Yugoslavia	Božidar Drenovac	Étoile du Sahel	
1963–64	Italy	Fabio Roccheggiani	Club Africain	
1964–65	Tunisia	Ammar Nahali	Stade Tunisien	
1965–66	Soviet Union	Aleksei Paramonov	Étoile du Sahel	
1966–67	Italy	Fabio Roccheggiani (2)	Club Africain	
1967–68	Hungary	Laszlo Balogh	Sfax Railways Sports	
1968–69	Yugoslavia	Acimovic Branislav	CS Sfaxien	
1969–70	Tunisia	Abderrahman Ben Azzedine	Espérance de Tunis	
1970–71	Yugoslavia	Jivko Popadic	CS Sfaxien	
1971–72	Tunisia	Abdelmajid Chetali	Étoile du Sahel	
1972–73	Tunisia	Jamel Eddine Bouabsa	Club Africain	
1973–74	Tunisia	Jamel Eddine Bouabsa (2)	Club Africain	
1974–75	Tunisia	Ahmed Dhib	Espérance de Tunis	
1975–76	Tunisia	Ahmed Dhib (2)	Espérance de Tunis	
1976–77	Yugoslavia	Dragan Vasiljevic	JS Kairouan	
1977–78	Yugoslavia	Milor Popov	Club Sfaxien	
1978–79	Hungary	Andrej Prean Nagy	Club Africain	
1979–80	Hungary	Andrej Prean Nagy (2)	Club Africain	
1980–81	Germany	Michael Pfeiffer	CS Sfaxien	
1981–82	Tunisia	Ahmed Dhib (3)	Espérance de Tunis	
1982–83	Yugoslavia	Milor Popov (2)	Club Sfaxien	
1983–84	Tunisia	Youssef Zouaoui	CA Bizertin	
1984–85	Brazil	Amarildo Tavares da Silveira	Espérance de Tunis	
1985–86	Tunisia	Amor Dhib	Étoile du Sahel	
1986–87	Tunisia	Faouzi Benzarti	Étoile du Sahel	
1987–88	Poland	Antoni Piechniczek	Espérance de Tunis	
1988–89	Poland	Antoni Piechniczek (2)	Espérance de Tunis	
1989–90	Tunisia	Faouzi Benzarti (2)	Club Africain	
1990–91	Poland	Władysław Żmuda	Espérance de Tunis	
1991–92	Romania	Ilie Balaci	Club Africain	
1992–93	Poland	Zdzislaw Podedworny	Espérance de Tunis	
1993–94	Tunisia	Faouzi Benzarti (3)	Espérance de Tunis	
1994–95	Brazil	José Paulo	CS Sfaxien	
1995–96	France	Jean Sérafin	Club Africain	
1996–97	Brazil	José Dutra dos Santos	Étoile du Sahel	
1997–98	Tunisia	Youssef Zouaoui (2)	Espérance de Tunis	
1998–99	Tunisia	Youssef Zouaoui (3)	Espérance de Tunis	
1999–2000	Tunisia	Youssef Zouaoui (4)	Espérance de Tunis	
2000–01	Tunisia	Youssef Zouaoui (5)	Espérance de Tunis	
2001–02	Switzerland	Michel Decastel	Espérance de Tunis	
2002–03	Tunisia	Faouzi Benzarti (4)	Espérance de Tunis	
2003–04	Argentina	Oscar Fulloné	Espérance de Tunis	
2004–05	Switzerland	Michel Decastel (2)	CS Sfaxien	
2005–06	Tunisia	Khaled Ben Yahia	Espérance de Tunis	
2006–07	Tunisia	Faouzi Benzarti (5)	Étoile du Sahel	
2007–08	Algeria	Abdelhak Benchikha	Club Africain	
2008–09	Tunisia	Faouzi Benzarti (6)	Espérance de Tunis	
2009–10	Tunisia	Faouzi Benzarti (7)	Espérance de Tunis	
2010–11	Tunisia	Nabil Maâloul	Espérance de Tunis	
2011–12	Tunisia	Nabil Maâloul (2)	Espérance de Tunis	
2012–13	Netherlands	Ruud Krol	CS Sfaxien	
2013–14	Netherlands	Ruud Krol (2)	Espérance de Tunis	
2014–15	France	Daniel Sanchez	Club Africain	
2015–16	Tunisia	Faouzi Benzarti (8)	Étoile du Sahel	
2016–17	Tunisia	Faouzi Benzarti (9)	Espérance de Tunis	
2017–18	Tunisia	Khaled Ben Yahia (2)	Espérance de Tunis	
2018–19	Tunisia	Mouin Chaâbani	Espérance de Tunis	
2019–20	Tunisia	Mouin Chaâbani (2)	Espérance de Tunis	
2020–21	Tunisia	Mouin Chaâbani (3)	Espérance de Tunis	
2021–22	Tunisia	Nabil Maâloul (3)	Espérance de Tunis	
2022–23	Tunisia	Faouzi Benzarti (10)	Étoile du Sahel	
2023–24	Portugal	Miguel Cardoso	Espérance de Tunis	
2024–25	Tunisia	Maher Kanzari	Espérance de Tunis	
2025–26	Tunisia	Faouzi Benzarti (11)	Club Africain	

== By manager ==
Manager	Titles	Club(s)	Winning seasons
(Tunisia) Faouzi Benzarti	11	Étoile du Sahel, Espérance de Tunis, Club Africain	1986–87, 1989–90, 1993–94, 2002–03, 2006–07, 2008–09, 2009–10, 2015–16, 2016–17, 2022–23, 2025–26
(Tunisia) Youssef Zouaoui	5	CA Bizertin, Espérance de Tunis	1983–84, 1997–98, 1998–99, 1999–2000, 2000–01
(Algeria) Habib Draoua	3	Stade Tunisien, Espérance de Tunis	1956–57, 1959–60, 1960–61
(Tunisia) Ahmed Dhib	3	Espérance de Tunis, Étoile du Sahel	1974–75, 1975–76, 1981–82
(Tunisia) Mouine Chaabani	3	Espérance de Tunis	2018–19, 2019–20, 2020–21
(Tunisia) Nabil Maâloul	3	Espérance de Tunis	2010–11, 2011–12, 2021–22
(Switzerland) Michel Decastel	2	Espérance de Tunis, CS Sfaxien	2001–02, 2004–05
(Tunisia) Khaled Ben Yahia	2	Espérance de Tunis	2005–06, 2017–18
(Netherlands) Ruud Krol	2	CS Sfaxien, Espérance de Tunis	2012–13, 2013–14
(England) George Berry	2	CS Hammam-Lif, Étoile du Sahel	1955–56, 1957–58
(Italy) Fabio Roccheggiani	2	Club Africain	1963–64, 1966–67
(Hungary) André Nagy	2	Club Africain	1978–79, 1979–80
(Poland) Antoni Piechniczek	2	Espérance de Tunis	1987–88, 1988–89
(Socialist Federal Republic of Yugoslavia) Milor Popov	2	CS Sfaxien	1977–78, 1982–83
(Tunisia) Jamel Eddine Bouabsa	2	Club Africain	1972–73, 1973–74
(Tunisia) Hechmi Cherif	1	Espérance de Tunis	1958–59
(Tunisia) Rachid Turki	1	Stade Tunisien	1961–62
(Socialist Federal Republic of Yugoslavia) Božidar Drenovac	1	Étoile du Sahel	1962–63
(Tunisia) Ammar Nahali	1	Stade Tunisien	1964–65
(Soviet Union) Aleksei Paramonov	1	Étoile du Sahel	1965–66
(Hungary) Laszlo Balogh	1	Sfax railway sport	1967–68
(Socialist Federal Republic of Yugoslavia) Branislav Acimovic	1	CS Sfaxien	1968–69
(Tunisia) Abderrahmane Ben Ezzedine	1	Espérance de Tunis	1969–70
(Socialist Federal Republic of Yugoslavia) Jivko Popadic	1	CS Sfaxien	1970–71
(Tunisia) Abdelmajid Chetali	1	Étoile du Sahel	1971–72
(Socialist Federal Republic of Yugoslavia) Dragan Vasiljević	1	JS Kairouan	1976–77
(Germany) Michael Pfeiffer	1	CS Sfaxien	1980–81
(Brazil) Amarildo	1	Espérance de Tunis	1984–85
(Tunisia) Amor Dhib	1	Étoile du Sahel	1985–86
(Poland) Władysław Żmuda	1	Espérance de Tunis	1990–91
(Romania) Ilie Balaci	1	Club Africain	1991–92
(Poland) Zdzisław Podedworny	1	Espérance de Tunis	1992–93
(Brazil) José Paulo	1	CS Sfaxien	1994–95
(France) Jean Sérafin	1	Club Africain	1995–96
(Brazil) José Dutra dos Santos	1	Étoile du Sahel	1996–97
(Argentina) Oscar Fulloné	1	Espérance de Tunis	2003–04
(Algeria) Abdelhak Benchikha	1	Club Africain	2007–08
(France) Daniel Sanchez	1	Club Africain	2014–15
(Portugal) Miguel Cardoso	1	Espérance de Tunis	2023–24
(Tunisia) Maher Kanzari	1	Espérance de Tunis	2024–25

== See also ==
- List of Tunisian football champions
