= List of Tunisian football champions =

Tunisian football champions
- Founded: 9 June 1907; 119 years ago
- Confederation: CAF
- Number of clubs: 16
- Level on pyramid: 1
- Relegation to: Tunisian Ligue Professionnelle 2
- Domestic cup(s): Tunisian Cup; Tunisian Super Cup
- Current champions: Club Africain (14th title) (2025–26)
- Most championships: Espérance de Tunis (34 titles)
- Current: 2026–27 Tunisian Ligue Professionnelle 1

The Tunisian football champions are the annual winners of the highest association football competition in Tunisia. The history of the Tunisian football championship is complex and reflects the This list summarizes the record of champions since 1907.

The first seasons were played under the organization of the Union des Sociétés Françaises de Sports Athlétiques. 15 seasons were played until 1921, when the Tunisian Football Association League was founded, which is the Tunisian branch of the French Football Federation. 36 seasons were played from 1921 to 1956, until independence was declared in 1956. The teams affiliated with the French were dissolved and the Tunisian Football Federation was founded on 29 March 1957, to begin the Tunisian national championship until 1994, the date of the founding of the National Professional Football League, which has since been called the Tunisian Ligue Professionnelle 1.

Espérance Sportive de Tunis is the club that has won the title the most with 34 titles.

== Champions ==
=== Under the rule of the USFSA (1909–21) ===
N°	Season	Winners
1	1907	Racing Club de Tunis (1)
—	1907–08	No competition
2	1908–09	Racing Club de Tunis (2)
3	1909–10	Racing Club de Tunis (3)
4	1910–11	Racing Club de Tunis (4)

N°	Season	Winners
5	1911–12	Sporting de Ferryville (1)
6	1912–13	Sporting de Ferryville (2)
7	1913–14	Racing Club de Tunis (5)
—	1914–15	No competition
—	1915–16	No competition

N°	Season	Winners
—	1916–17	No competition
—	1917–18	No competition
—	1918–19	No competition
8	1919–20	Racing Club de Tunis (6)
9	1920–21	Racing Club de Tunis (7)

=== Under the rule of LTFA (1921–55) ===
N°	Season	Winners
1	1921–22	Racing Club de Tunis (8)
2	1922–23	Stade Gaulois (1)
3	1923–24	Stade Gaulois (2)
4	1924–25	Racing Club de Tunis (9)
5	1925–26	Sporting Club de Tunis (1)
6	1926–27	Stade Gaulois (3)
7	1927–28	Sporting Club de Tunis (2)
8	1928–29	Avant Garde (1)
9	1929–30	US Tunis (1)
10	1930–31	US Tunis (2)
11	1931–32	Italia de Tunis (1)
12	1932–33	US Tunis (3)

N°	Season	Winners
13	1933–34	Sfax RS (1)
14	1934–35	Italia de Tunis (2)
15	1935–36	Italia de Tunis (3)
16	1936–37	Italia de Tunis (4)
17	1937–38	Savoia de La Goulette (1)
18	1938–39	CS Gabésien (1)
—	1939–40	No competition
—	1940–41	No competition
19	1941–42	Espérance de Tunis (1)
—	1942–43	No competition
—	1943–44	No competition
20	1944–45	CA Bizertin (1)

N°	Season	Winners
21	1945–46	CA Bizertin (2)
22	1946–47	Club Africain (1)
23	1947–48	Club Africain (2)
24	1948–49	CA Bizertin (3)
25	1949–50	Étoile du Sahel (1)
26	1950–51	CS Hammam-Lif (1)
—	1951–52	No competition
27	1952–53	Sfax RS (2)
28	1953–54	CS Hammam-Lif (2)
29	1954–55	CS Hammam-Lif (3)

=== Post-independence (1956–present) ===
Key
Champions also won the Tunisia Cup that season
Champions also won the Tunisian Super Cup that season
Champions also won the Tunisia Cup and Tunisian Super Cup
Champions also won the CAF Champions League that season
Champions also won the CAF Cup or CAF Confederation Cup that season
Champions also won the Tunisia Cup and CAF Champions League that season
Champions also won the Tunisian Super Cup and CAF Champions League that season

Season	N°	Teams	Results			Winner statistics						Ref
Season	N°	Teams	Winners	Runners-up	Third place	W	D	L	GF	GA	Pts	Ref
1955–56	01	12	CS Hammam-Lif (4)	Étoile du Sahel	Club Africain	15	6	1	56	15	58	
1956–57	02	12	Stade Tunisien (1)	Espérance de Tunis	Étoile du Sahel	16	4	2	54	24	58	
1957–58	03	15	Étoile du Sahel (2)	Espérance de Tunis	Stade Tunisien	17	8	3	66	28	70	
1958–59	04	14	Espérance de Tunis (2)	Étoile du Sahel	US Tunis	18	4	4	63	25	66	
1959–60	05	13	Espérance de Tunis (3)	Stade Tunisien	Club Africain	19	3	2	65	23	65	
1960–61	06	12	Stade Tunisien (2)	Espérance de Tunis	US Tunis	16	2	2	42	17	54	
1961–62	07	12	Stade Tunisien (3)	Stade Soussien	Espérance de Tunis	16	4	2	39	10	58	
1962–63	08	12	Étoile du Sahel (3)	Stade Tunisien	AS Marsa	14	8	0	35	13	58	
1963–64	09	12	Club Africain (3)	Espérance de Tunis	CS Sfaxien	11	9	2	34	10	53	
1964–65	10	12	Stade Tunisien (4)	Club Africain	Étoile du Sahel	14	6	2	41	16	65	
1965–66	11	12	Étoile du Sahel (4)	CS Sfaxien	AS Marsa	15	6	1	53	19	58	
1966–67	12	12	Club Africain (4)	Étoile du Sahel	Stade Tunisien	15	6	1	38	10	58	
1967–68	13	12	Sfax RS (3)	Club Africain	Stade Tunisien	13	6	3	29	11	54	
1968–69	14	14	CS Sfaxien (1)	Club Africain	AS Marsa	17	5	4	45	20	65	
1969–70	15	14	Espérance de Tunis (4)	Club Africain	Étoile du Sahel	14	9	3	31	13	63	
1970–71	16	14	CS Sfaxien (2)	Club Africain	CO Transports	15	9	2	38	16	65	
1971–72	17	14	Étoile du Sahel (5)	Club Africain	CO Transports	15	9	2	37	14	65	
1972–73	18	14	Club Africain (5)	Étoile du Sahel	Espérance de Tunis	15	9	2	37	15	65	
1973–74	19	14	Club Africain (6)	Espérance de Tunis	Étoile du Sahel	16	5	5	40	18	63	
1974–75	20	14	Espérance de Tunis (5)	Club Africain	Étoile du Sahel	16	6	4	44	18	64	
1975–76	21	14	Espérance de Tunis (6)	Étoile du Sahel	Club Africain	14	8	4	36	20	62	
1976–77	22	14	JS Kairouan (1)	Club Africain	CS Sfaxien	14	7	5	40	27	61	
1977–78	23	14	CS Sfaxien (3)	Club Africain	Étoile du Sahel	17	7	2	41	12	67	
1978–79	24	14	Club Africain (7)	Stade Tunisien	Étoile du Sahel	15	8	3	28	12	64	
1979–80	25	14	Club Africain (8)	Espérance de Tunis	Étoile du Sahel	15	9	2	37	7	65	
1980–81	26	14	CS Sfaxien (4)	Club Africain	Espérance de Tunis	16	7	3	33	19	65	
1981–82	27	14	Espérance de Tunis (7)	Club Africain	Étoile du Sahel	14	10	2	42	12	64	
1982–83	28	14	CS Sfaxien (5)	Club Africain	Espérance de Tunis	15	8	3	33	10	64	
1983–84	29	14	CA Bizertin (4)	Stade Tunisien	Étoile du Sahel	14	8	4	36	12	62	
1984–85	30	14	Espérance de Tunis (8)	Club Africain	CS Hammam-Lif	15	8	3	32	15	64	
1985–86	31	14	Étoile du Sahel (6)	Espérance de Tunis	Club Africain	1	13	1	31	18	63	
1986–87	32	14	Étoile du Sahel (7)	Club Africain	Espérance de Tunis	16	5	5	42	19	79	
1987–88	33	14	Espérance de Tunis (9)	CO Transports	Club Africain	15	10	1	48	13	81	
1988–89	34	14	Espérance de Tunis (10)	Club Africain	Étoile du Sahel	15	5	3	46	19	85	
1989–90	35	14	Club Africain (9)	Espérance de Tunis	Stade Tunisien	17	6	3	42	12	83	
1990–91	36	14	Espérance de Tunis (11)	Club Africain	Étoile du Sahel	16	8	2	31	13	82	
1991–92	37	14	Club Africain (10)	CA Bizertin	Espérance de Tunis	18	4	4	50	14	84	
1992–93	38	14	Espérance de Tunis (12)	JS Kairouan	CA Bizertin	18	7	1	43	15	43	
1993–94	39	14	Espérance de Tunis (13)	Étoile du Sahel	Club Africain	19	5	2	52	12	43	
1994–95	40	14	CS Sfaxien (6)	Espérance de Tunis	Étoile du Sahel	17	4	5	40	16	38	
1995–96	41	14	Club Africain (11)	Étoile du Sahel	Espérance de Tunis	19	6	1	49	7	63	
1996–97	42	14	Étoile du Sahel (8)	Espérance de Tunis	CS Sfaxien	20	4	2	45	16	64	
1997–98	43	14	Espérance de Tunis (14)	Club Africain	Étoile du Sahel	22	3	1	63	10	69	
1998–99	44	16	Espérance de Tunis (15)	CA Bizertin	CS Sfaxien	14	9	0	60	20	68	
1999–2000	45	12	Espérance de Tunis (16)	Étoile du Sahel	CS Sfaxien	19	3	0	53	7	60	
2000–01	46	12	Espérance de Tunis (17)	Étoile du Sahel	Club Africain	18	3	1	38	8	57	
2001–02	47	12	Espérance de Tunis (18)	Étoile du Sahel	Club Africain	13	7	2	40	19	46	
2002–03	48	12	Espérance de Tunis (19)	Étoile du Sahel	Club Africain	18	3	1	47	17	57	
2003–04	49	12	Espérance de Tunis (20)	Étoile du Sahel	Club Africain	17	2	3	38	13	53	
2004–05	50	14	CS Sfaxien (7)	Étoile du Sahel	Club Africain	17	7	2	44	12	58	
2005–06	51	14	Espérance de Tunis (21)	Étoile du Sahel	Club Africain	17	5	4	42	21	56	
2006–07	52	14	Étoile du Sahel (9)	Club Africain	Espérance de Tunis	15	8	3	43	18	54	
2007–08	53	14	Club Africain (12)	Étoile du Sahel	Espérance de Tunis	19	6	1	37	12	63	
2008–09	54	14	Espérance de Tunis (22)	Club Africain	Étoile du Sahel	18	6	2	50	21	60	
2009–10	55	14	Espérance de Tunis (23)	Club Africain	Étoile du Sahel	16	6	4	56	24	54	
2010–11	56	14	Espérance de Tunis (24)	Étoile du Sahel	CS Sfaxien	20	4	2	50	18	64	
2011–12	57	16	Espérance de Tunis (25)	CA Bizertin	CS Sfaxien	22	3	5	61	22	69	
2012–13	58	16	CS Sfaxien (8)	Espérance de Tunis	Étoile du Sahel	12	5	3	31	16	41	
2013–14	59	16	Espérance de Tunis (26)	CS Sfaxien	Étoile du Sahel	19	9	2	48	15	66	
2014–15	60	14	Club Africain (13)	Étoile du Sahel	Espérance de Tunis	20	5	5	50	18	65	
2015–16	61	14	Étoile du Sahel (10)	Espérance de Tunis	CS Sfaxien	24	5	1	57	17	77	
2016–17	62	16	Espérance de Tunis (27)	Étoile du Sahel	Club Africain	16	7	1	37	8	55	
2017–18	63	14	Espérance de Tunis (28)	Club Africain	Étoile du Sahel	17	7	2	46	19	58	
2018–19	64	14	Espérance de Tunis (29)	Étoile du Sahel	CS Sfaxien	17	5	4	37	15	56	
2019–20	65	14	Espérance de Tunis (30)	CS Sfaxien	US Monastir	18	8	0	41	12	62	
2020–21	66	14	Espérance de Tunis (31)	Étoile du Sahel	US Ben Guerdane	19	3	4	37	16	60	
2021–22	67	16	Espérance de Tunis (32)	US Monastir	CS Sfaxien	14	6	4	36	14	48	
2022–23	68	16	Étoile du Sahel (11)	Espérance de Tunis	Club Africain	18	6	4	42	14	60	
2023–24	69	14	Espérance de Tunis (33)	US Monastir	CS Sfaxien	16	5	1	33	12	53	
2024–25	70	16	Espérance de Tunis (34)	US Monastir	Étoile du Sahel	19	9	2	57	22	66	
2025–26	71	16	Club Africain (14)	Espérance de Tunis	CS Sfaxien	19	9	2	43	10	66	

== Total Tunisian Ligue Professionnelle 1 titles won ==
=== By club ===
Rank	Club	Titles	Winning seasons
1	**Espérance de Tunis**	34	1941–42, 1958–59, 1959–60, 1969–70, 1974–75, 1975–76, 1981–82, 1984–85, 1987–88, 1988–89, 1990–91, 1992–93, 1993–94, 1997–98, 1998–99, 1999–00, 2000–01, 2001–02, 2002–03, 2003–04, 2005–06, 2008–09, 2009–10, 2010–11, 2011–12, 2013–14, 2016–17, 2017–18, 2018–19, 2019–20, 2020–21, 2021–22, 2023–24, 2024–25
2	**Club Africain**	14	1946–47, 1947–48, 1963–64, 1966–67, 1972–73, 1973–74, 1978–79, 1979–80, 1989–90, 1991–92, 1995–96, 2007–08, 2014–15, 2025–26
3	**Étoile du Sahel**	11	1949–50, 1957–58, 1962–63, 1965–66, 1971–72, 1985–86, 1986–87, 1996–97, 2006–07, 2015–16, 2022–23
5	Racing Club de Tunis	9	1907, 1908–09, 1909–10, 1910–11, 1913–14, 1919–20, 1920–21, 1921–22, 1924–25
4	**CS Sfaxien**	8	1968–69, 1970–71, 1977–78, 1980–81, 1982–83, 1994–95, 2004–05, 2012–13
6	**CS Hammam-Lif**	4	1950–51, 1953–54, 1954–55, 1955–56
6	**Stade Tunisien**	4	1956–57, 1960–61, 1961–62, 1964–65
6	**CA Bizertin**	4	1944–45, 1945–46, 1948–49, 1983–84
6	Italia de Tunis	4	1931–32, 1934–35, 1935–36, 1936–37
10	Sfax RS	3	1933–34, 1952–53, 1967–68
10	US Tunis	3	1929–30, 1930–31, 1932–33
10	Stade Gaulois de Tunis	3	1922–23, 1923–24, 1926–27
13	Sporting de Ferryville	2	1911–12, 1912–13
13	Sporting Club de Tunis	2	1925–26, 1927–28
15	JS Kairouan	1	1976–77
15	Savoia de la Goulette	1	1937–38
15	CS Gabésien	1	1938–39
15	Avant Garde de Tunis	1	1928–29

- Teams in **bold** compete in 2026–27 Ligue 1.
- Teams in italics are defunct.

=== By region ===
Region	Titles	Club(s)
Tunis	75	Espérance de Tunis (34), Club Africain (14), Racing Club de Tunis (9), Stade Tunisien (4), Italia de Tunis (4), US Tunis (3), Stade Gaulois de Tunis (3), Sporting de Tunis (2), Savoia de la Goulette (1), Avant Garde de Tunis (1).
Sfax	11	CS Sfaxien (8), Sfax RS (3)
Sousse	11	Étoile du Sahel (11)
Bizerte	6	CA Bizertin (4) Sporting de Ferryville (2)
Ben Arous	4	CS Hammam-Lif (4)
Kairouan	1	JS Kairouan (1)
Gabès	1	CS Gabésien (1)

- Teams in italics are defunct.
