= Tunisian Golden Boot =

The competition for the Tunisian Golden Boot was instituted by the newspaper L'Action Tunisienne in 1969–70, with a jury made up of sports figures and journalists. It consists of assigning stars to players based on their performance in the league. It takes place until 1994–95 under the sponsorship of the newspaper Le Renouveau but ends in confusion.

== Winners ==
Season	Player	Club
1969–70	Othman Jenayah	Étoile Sportive du Sahel
1970–71	Ahmed Zitouni	Club Africain
1971–72	Ahmed Mghirbi	Stade Tunisien
1972–73	Ezzedine Chakroun	Sfax Railway Sports
1973–74	Mohieddine Habita	CO Transports
1974–75	Hammadi Agrebi	CS Sfaxien
1975–76	Khemaïs Laabidi	JS Kairouan
1976–77	Mohsen Labidi	Stade Tunisien
1977–78	Raouf Ben Aziza	Étoile Sportive du Sahel
1978–79	Hédi Bayari	Club Africain
1979–80	Mokhtar Dhouib	CS Sfaxien
1980–81	Khaled Ben Yahia	Espérance Sportive de Tunis
1981–82	Tarak Dhiab	Espérance Sportive de Tunis
1982–83	Slah Fessi	Stade Tunisien
1983–84	Mondher Jaballah	Stade Tunisien
1984–85	Jamel Tayeche	JS Kairouan
1985–86	Kamel Azzabi	Étoile Sportive du Sahel
1986–87	Khaled Ben Yahia	Espérance Sportive de Tunis
1987–88	Jameleddine Limam	Stade Tunisien
1988–89	Abdelhamid Hergal	Stade Tunisien
1989–90	Faouzi Rouissi	Club Africain
1990–91	Mohamed Ayadi	Sfax Railway Sports
1991–92	Amor Ben Tahar	Océano Club de Kerkennah
1992–93	Abdelkader Ben Hassen	CA Bizertin
1993–94	Skander Souayah	CS Sfaxien
1994–95	Tarek Touhami	Olympique du Kef
