= Mohamed Hakim =

Tunisian footballer

Personal information
- Date of birth: 7 July 1987 (age 39)
- Position: Midfielder

Senior career*
Years	Team	Apps	(Gls)
2008–2009	AS Kasserine		
2009–2010	EGS Gafsa		
2010–2011	AS Gabès		
2011–2013	AS Kasserine		
2011–2013	Olympique Beja		
2016–2018	ES Métlaoui		
- * Club domestic league appearances and goals

Mohamed Hakim (born 7 July 1987) is a Tunisian football midfielder.
