= 1989–90 Tunisian National Championship =

Tunisian National Championship
- Season: 1989–90
- Champions: Club Africain
- Relegated: Club Sportif Cheminots; Avenir Sportif de Kasserine
- Matches: 182
- Goals: 374 (2.05 per match)
- Top goalscorer: Faouzi Rouissi (Club Africain) (18 goals)

The 1989–90 Tunisian National Championship was the thirty-fifth season of the Tunisian national football championship following the country's independence in 1956. The competition was won by Club Africain, who finished level on 83 points with Espérance Sportive de Tunis and won the title on their head-to-head record against them. It was Club Africain's seventh league title since independence. The defending champions, Espérance, finished second.

The league was contested by 14 clubs, each playing 26 matches. Club Sportif Cheminots and Avenir Sportif de Kasserine were relegated at the end of the campaign, while CA Bizertin and JS Kairouan were promoted for the following season.

== League table ==
Pos	Team	Pld	W	D	L	GF	GA	GD	Pts
1	Club Africain (C)	26	17	6	3	42	12	+30	83
2	Espérance de Tunis	26	16	9	1	44	11	+33	83
3	Stade Tunisien	26	16	8	2	40	18	+22	82
4	Étoile du Sahel	26	13	8	5	35	20	+15	73
5	CS Hammam-Lif	26	10	5	11	17	20	−3	61
6	Avenir Sportif de La Marsa	26	8	10	8	26	21	+5	60
7	Sfax Railways Sports	26	8	7	11	23	28	−5	57
8	Avenir Sportif Oued Ellil	26	9	2	15	23	36	−13	55
9	Club Sportif Sfaxien	26	7	8	11	24	38	−14	55
10	Club Olympique des Transports	26	6	10	10	19	26	−7	54
11	Olympique de Béja	26	7	6	13	22	32	−10	53
12	Union Sportive Monastir	26	6	6	14	25	35	−10	50
13	Club Sportif Cheminots (R)	26	4	9	13	18	41	−23	47
14	Avenir Sportif de Kasserine (R)	26	4	8	14	16	36	−20	44

Source: RSSSF
Rules for classification: 1) points (4 for a win, 2 for a draw, 1 for a defeat). 2) head-to-head record.
(C) = Champions; (R) = Relegated.
Note: Club Africain and Espérance Sportive de Tunis finished level on 83 points; RSSSF's tie-break data shows Club Africain ahead on head-to-head results.
Note: Avenir Sportif de Kasserine lost two matches by award (0–3), against Union Sportive Monastir and Espérance Sportive de Tunis; RSSSF's points total for the club is two lower than its results alone give.

== Top scorers ==
Faouzi Rouissi of Club Africain was the league's top scorer with 18 goals.

== See also ==
- 1988–89 Tunisian National Championship
- 1990–91 Tunisian National Championship
- Tunisian Ligue Professionnelle 1
- Tunisian Cup
