= 1986–87 Tunisian National Championship =

Tunisian National Championship
- Season: 1986–87
- Champions: Étoile Sportive du Sahel
- Relegated: Océano Club de Kerkennah; Sfax Railways Sports; Avenir Sportif de La Marsa
- Matches: 182
- Goals: 373 (2.05 per match)
- Top goalscorer: Adnène Laajili (Union Sportive Monastir) (14 goals)

The 1986–87 Tunisian National Championship was the thirty-second season of the Tunisian national football championship following the country's independence in 1956. The competition was won by the defending champions Étoile Sportive du Sahel, who finished five points ahead of Club Africain in the final standings. It was Étoile du Sahel's sixth league title since independence and their second in a row.

The league was contested by 14 clubs, each playing 26 matches. Sfax Railways Sports and Avenir Sportif de La Marsa finished at the bottom and were relegated. Océano Club de Kerkennah, who finished 12th, lost a play-off against Grombalia Sports on the away-goals rule and were relegated as well. Olympique du Kef, Avenir Sportif de Kasserine and Grombalia Sports were promoted for the following season.

== League table ==
Pos	Team	Pld	W	D	L	GF	GA	GD	Pts
1	Étoile du Sahel (C)	26	16	5	5	42	19	+23	79
2	Club Africain	26	13	9	4	26	16	+10	74
3	Espérance de Tunis	26	12	11	3	35	16	+19	73
4	JS Kairouan	26	9	12	5	31	25	+6	65
5	Union Sportive Monastir	26	8	10	8	30	33	−3	60
6	CA Bizertin	26	7	11	8	23	33	−10	58
7	Club Olympique des Transports	26	8	8	10	25	30	−5	58
8	CS Hammam-Lif	26	7	10	9	27	23	+4	57
9	Stade Tunisien	26	5	14	7	25	25	0	55
10	Club Sportif Sfaxien	26	7	8	11	29	31	−2	55
11	Olympique de Béja	26	5	12	9	20	27	−7	53
12	Océano Club de Kerkennah (R)	26	6	8	12	28	42	−14	52
13	Sfax Railways Sports (R)	26	4	13	9	16	22	−6	51
14	Avenir Sportif de La Marsa (R)	26	5	9	12	16	31	−15	50

Source: RSSSF
Rules for classification: 1) points (4 for a win, 2 for a draw, 1 for a defeat).
(C) = Champions; (R) = Relegated.
Note: Océano Club de Kerkennah lost a play-off against Grombalia Sports on the away-goals rule (0–0 and 1–1) and were relegated.

== Top scorers ==
Adnène Laajili of Union Sportive Monastir was the league's top scorer with 14 goals.

== See also ==
- 1985–86 Tunisian National Championship
- 1987–88 Tunisian National Championship
- Tunisian Ligue Professionnelle 1
- Tunisian Cup
