= Władysław Żmuda (born 1939) =

Polish footballer and coach

Personal information
- Full name: Władysław Jan Żmuda
- Date of birth: 10 February 1939 (age 87)
- Place of birth: Ruda Śląska, Poland
- Position: Midfielder

Senior career*
Years	Team	Apps	(Gls)
–1962	Slavia Ruda Śląska		
1962–1971	Śląsk Wrocław		

Managerial career
- 1971–1977: Śląsk Wrocław
- 1977–1980: Górnik Zabrze
- 1980–1981: GKS Katowice
- 1981–1984: Widzew Łódź
- 1985–1987: Ruch Chorzów
- 1987–1990: GKS Katowice
- 1990–1991: Espérance de Tunis
- 1992: Widzew Łódź
- 1994: Polonia Bytom
- * Club domestic league appearances and goals

Władysław Jan Żmuda (born 10 February 1939) is a Polish former professional footballer and manager.

== Career ==
=== Playing career ===
Żmuda played for Slavia Ruda Śląska and Śląsk Wrocław.

=== Coaching career ===
Żmuda managed Śląsk Wrocław, Górnik Zabrze, GKS Katowice, Widzew Łódź, Ruch Chorzów and Espérance de Tunis.

== Honours ==
=== Player ===
Śląsk Wrocław

- II liga: 1963–64

=== Manager ===
Śląsk Wrocław

- Ekstraklasa: 1976–77
- Polish Cup: 1975–76

Widzew Łódź

- Ekstraklasa: 1981–82
- Intertoto Cup: 1982

Espérance Tunis

- Tunisian Ligue Professionnelle 1: 1990–91
- Tunisian Cup: 1990–91

Individual

- Polish Coach of the Year: 1982
