= 1977–78 Tunisian National Championship =

Tunisian National Championship
- Season: 1977–78
- Champions: Club Sportif Sfaxien
- Relegated: Union Sportive Monastir; Stade Africain de Menzel Bourguiba
- Matches: 182
- Goals: 417 (2.29 per match)
- Top goalscorer: Abderraouf Ben Aziza (Étoile du Sahel) (20 goals)

The 1977–78 Tunisian National Championship was the twenty-third season of the Tunisian national football championship following the country's independence in 1956. The competition was won by Club Sportif Sfaxien, who finished 5 points ahead of Club Africain in the final standings. It was Club Sportif Sfaxien's third league title since independence. The defending champions, JS Kairouan, finished seventh.

The league was contested by 14 clubs, each playing 26 matches. Union Sportive Monastir and Stade Africain de Menzel Bourguiba were relegated at the end of the campaign, while Olympique du Kef and Océano Club de Kerkennah were promoted for the following season.

== League table ==
Pos	Team	Pld	W	D	L	GF	GA	GD	Pts
1	Club Sportif Sfaxien (C)	26	17	7	2	41	12	+29	67
2	Club Africain	26	14	8	4	34	15	+19	62
3	Étoile du Sahel	26	13	7	6	44	25	+19	59
4	Sfax Railways Sports	26	9	11	6	31	29	+2	55
5	Avenir Sportif de La Marsa	26	10	8	8	34	34	0	54
6	Espérance de Tunis	26	10	7	9	34	33	+1	53
7	JS Kairouan	26	9	8	9	36	32	+4	52
8	CS Hammam-Lif	26	6	13	7	22	22	0	51
9	CA Bizertin	26	9	7	10	26	27	−1	51
10	Stade Tunisien	26	7	10	9	29	33	−4	50
11	Club Olympique des Transports	26	6	11	9	21	36	−15	49
12	Stade Sportif Sfaxien	26	6	9	11	25	36	−11	47
13	Union Sportive Monastir (R)	26	4	11	11	24	33	−9	45
14	Stade Africain de Menzel Bourguiba (R)	26	2	3	21	16	50	−34	33

Source: RSSSF
Rules for classification: 1) points (3 for a win, 2 for a draw, 1 for a defeat).
(C) = Champions; (R) = Relegated.

== Top scorers ==
Abderraouf Ben Aziza of Étoile du Sahel was the league's top scorer with 20 goals.

== See also ==
- 1976–77 Tunisian National Championship
- 1978–79 Tunisian National Championship
- Tunisian Ligue Professionnelle 1
- Tunisian Cup
