= 1988–89 Tunisian National Championship =

Tunisian National Championship
- Season: 1988–89
- Champions: Espérance Sportive de Tunis
- Relegated: CA Bizertin; JS Kairouan; Océano Club de Kerkennah
- Matches: 182
- Goals: 394 (2.16 per match)
- Top goalscorer: Abdelhamid Hergal (Stade Tunisien) (15 goals)

The 1988–89 Tunisian National Championship was the thirty-fourth season of the Tunisian national football championship following the country's independence in 1956. The competition was won by the defending champions Espérance Sportive de Tunis, who finished 13 points ahead of Club Africain in the final standings. It was Espérance's ninth league title since independence and their second in a row.

The league was contested by 14 clubs, each playing 26 matches. JS Kairouan and Océano Club de Kerkennah finished at the bottom and were relegated. CA Bizertin, who finished 12th, lost a play-off against CS Hammam-Lif on penalties and were relegated as well. Club Sportif Cheminots, Avenir Sportif Oued Ellil and CS Hammam-Lif were promoted for the following season.

== League table ==
Pos	Team	Pld	W	D	L	GF	GA	GD	Pts
1	Espérance de Tunis (C)	26	18	5	3	46	19	+27	85
2	Club Africain	26	13	7	6	40	28	+12	72
3	Étoile du Sahel	26	12	8	6	37	22	+15	70
4	Stade Tunisien	26	10	9	7	34	28	+6	65
5	Sfax Railways Sports	26	10	8	8	33	29	+4	64
6	Club Sportif Sfaxien	26	8	11	7	22	26	−4	61
7	Avenir Sportif de Kasserine	26	9	7	10	24	40	−16	60
8	Club Olympique des Transports	26	9	6	11	27	26	+1	59
9	Olympique de Béja	26	10	3	13	22	29	−7	59
10	Avenir Sportif de La Marsa	26	8	8	10	35	31	+4	58
11	Union Sportive Monastir	26	6	13	7	23	29	−6	57
12	CA Bizertin (R)	26	7	10	9	20	21	−1	57
13	JS Kairouan (R)	26	6	6	14	19	28	−9	50
14	Océano Club de Kerkennah (R)	26	2	7	17	12	38	−26	39

Source: RSSSF
Rules for classification: 1) points (4 for a win, 2 for a draw, 1 for a defeat).
(C) = Champions; (R) = Relegated.
Note: CA Bizertin lost a penalty shoot-out (4–5) after two goalless draws in a play-off against CS Hammam-Lif and were relegated.

== Top scorers ==
Abdelhamid Hergal of Stade Tunisien was the league's top scorer with 15 goals.

== See also ==
- 1987–88 Tunisian National Championship
- 1989–90 Tunisian National Championship
- Tunisian Ligue Professionnelle 1
- Tunisian Cup
