= 2015–16 Tunisian Ligue 3 =

Tunisian Ligue 3
- Season: 2015–16
- Promoted: SA Menzel Bourguiba; Stade Nabeulien; CO Médenine
- Relegated: JS Soukra; Club Medjezien; SS Ksour; Enfida Sports; CS Hajeb Laayoun; ES Djemmal; US Djerba Ajim; FC Mdhilla; SS Gafsa
- Matches played: 546
- Goals scored: 1,299 (2.38 per match)

The 2015–16 Tunisian Ligue 3 (Tunisian Professional League) was competed by 42 teams divided in 3 groups of 14 teams each.
The winner of each group is promoted to 2016–17 Tunisian Ligue Professionnelle 2, while the three last teams of each group are relegated to the Tunisian Ligue 4.

== Teams ==
=== North Group ===
- AS Mhamdia
- AS Oued Ellil
- AS Soliman
- AS Soukra
- Club Medjezien
- CO Transports
- Dahmani AC
- ES Radès
- JS El Omrane
- JS Soukra
- SS Ksour
- Stade Africain Menzel Bourguiba
- US Bousalem
- VS Menzel Abderrahmane

=== Center Group ===
- Ahly Bouhjar
- AS Jelma
- CS Bembla
- CS Hajeb Laayoun
- CS Hilalien
- CS Makthar
- Enfida Sports
- ES Djemmal
- ES Haffouz
- ES Beni-Khalled
- ES Fahs
- HS Kalâa Kebira
- Kalâa Sport
- Stade Nabeulien

=== South Group ===
- Club olympique de Médenine
- CS Chebba
- CS Redeyef
- Espoir Sportif de Jerba Midoun
- ES Feriana
- FC Mdhilla
- LPS Tozeur
- Océano Club de Kerkennah
- PS Sakiet Daier
- Sporting Club Moknine
- SS Gafsa
- US Djerba Ajim
- US Ksour Essef
- US Métouia

== Standings ==
=== North Group table ===
Pos	Team	Pld	W	D	L	GF	GA	GD	Pts	Promotion or relegation
1	Stade Africain Menzel Bourguiba	26	16	5	5	36	18	+18	53	Promotion to 2016–17 Ligue 2
2	AS Soliman	26	14	5	7	43	27	+16	47	
3	ES Radès	26	11	9	6	34	22	+12	42	
4	AS Oued Ellil	26	11	7	8	41	29	+12	40	
5	AS Mhamdia	26	12	4	10	37	32	+5	40	
6	JS El Omrane	26	12	3	11	29	28	+1	39	
7	AS Soukra	26	11	5	10	28	34	−6	38	
8	CO Transports	26	10	6	10	24	24	0	36	
9	US Bousalem	26	10	6	10	22	24	−2	36	
10	VS Menzel Abderrahmane	26	10	6	10	23	27	−4	36	
11	Dahmani AC	26	10	5	11	30	36	−6	35	
12	JS Soukra	26	8	7	11	30	32	−2	31	Relegation to Tunisian Ligue 4
13	Club Medjezien	26	4	9	13	15	27	−12	21	Relegation to Tunisian Ligue 4
14	SS Ksour	26	2	5	19	18	50	−32	11	Relegation to Tunisian Ligue 4

Updated to match(es) played on 22 May 2016. Source: Ligue 3
Rules for classification: 1) points; 2) goal difference; 3) number of goals scored.

=== Center Group table ===
Pos	Team	Pld	W	D	L	GF	GA	GD	Pts	Promotion or relegation
1	Stade Nabeulien	26	17	3	6	44	16	+28	54	Promotion to 2016–17 Ligue 2
2	ES Fahs	26	15	3	8	44	27	+17	48	
3	HS Kalâa Kebira	26	12	5	9	38	33	+5	41	
4	AS Jelma	26	11	6	9	33	33	0	39	
5	CS Hilalien	26	12	3	11	26	25	+1	39	
6	ES Beni-Khalled	26	10	7	9	29	20	+9	37	
7	CS Bembla	26	11	4	11	33	33	0	37	
8	Kalâa Sport	26	11	4	11	38	40	−2	37	
9	ES Haffouz	26	11	3	12	29	32	−3	36	
10	Ahly Bouhjar	26	10	5	11	29	40	−11	35	
11	CS Makthar	26	10	5	11	30	30	0	35	
12	Enfida Sports	26	9	3	14	28	39	−11	30	Relegation to Tunisian Ligue 4
13	CS Hajeb Laayoun	26	6	6	14	23	29	−6	24	Relegation to Tunisian Ligue 4
14	ES Djemmal	26	5	6	15	21	48	−27	21	Relegation to Tunisian Ligue 4

Updated to match(es) played on 22 May 2016. Source: Ligue 3
Rules for classification: 1) points; 2) goal difference; 3) number of goals scored.

=== South Group table ===
Pos	Team	Pld	W	D	L	GF	GA	GD	Pts	Promotion or relegation
1	CO Médenine	26	13	11	2	35	16	+19	50	Promotion to 2016–17 Ligue 2
2	LPS Tozeur	26	13	10	3	38	17	+21	49	
3	Océano Club de Kerkennah	26	14	6	6	58	29	+29	48	
4	CS Chebba	26	11	7	8	34	27	+7	40	
5	Sporting Club Moknine	26	11	3	12	31	33	−2	36	
6	Espoir Sportif de Jerba Midoun	26	10	6	10	29	34	−5	36	
7	CS Redeyef	26	10	4	12	30	37	−7	34	
8	PS Sakiet Daier	26	8	9	9	29	23	+6	33	
9	US Métouia	26	9	5	12	28	38	−10	32	
10	ES Feriana	26	7	10	9	27	30	−3	31	
11	US Ksour Essef	26	7	9	10	29	32	−3	30	
12	US Djerba Ajim	26	7	9	10	27	33	−6	30	Relegation to Tunisian Ligue 4
13	FC Mdhilla	26	7	6	13	29	43	−14	27	Relegation to Tunisian Ligue 4
14	SS Gafsa	26	4	5	17	20	52	−32	17	Relegation to Tunisian Ligue 4

Updated to match(es) played on 22 May 2016. Source: Ligue 3
Rules for classification: 1) points; 2) goal difference; 3) number of goals scored.

== See also ==
- 2015–16 Tunisian Ligue Professionnelle 1
- 2015–16 Tunisian Ligue Professionnelle 2
- 2015–16 Tunisian Cup
