= Habib Draoua =

Algerian footballer (1914–2008)

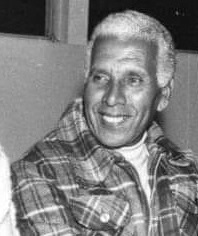
- Draoua in the 1970s

Personal information
- Full name: Hadj Habib Derbouz Draoua
- Date of birth: 1914
- Place of birth: Oran, Algeria
- Date of death: 29 October 2008 (aged 93–94)
- Place of death: Oran, Algeria
- Position: Midfielder

Senior career*
Years	Team	Apps	(Gls)
1934–1937	USM Oran		
1937–1945	Le Havre		
1945–1946	ES Tunis		
1946–1950	Stade Tunisien		

Managerial career
- 1945–1946: ES Tunis
- 1946–1951: Stade Tunisien
- 1951–1957: CS Hammam-Lif
- 1957: ALN
- 1957–1960: Tunisia
- 1964–1965: MC Oran
- 1970–1971: ASM Oran
- 1982–1983: MC Oran
- * Club domestic league appearances and goals

Hadj Habib Derbouz Draoua (Arabic: حاج حبيب دربوز دراوة; 1914 – 29 October 2008), commonly known as Habib Draoua and also called Hadj Draoua was an Algerian professional footballer who played as a midfielder. He was also a manager.

== Life and career ==
Habib Draoua was born in Mdina Jdida in the city of Oran in 1914. Very young, he joined USM Oran which was then the greatest Algerian Muslim club, where he did all his youth classes. He played his first senior match at the age of 20 in 1934. In 1937 he joined Le Havre, he remained in France until 1945 and the end of the Second World War. In 1945, he joined Tunisia as a coach-player at ES Tunis before being transferred to the CS Hammam Lif where he won two Tunisian Cups in 1951 and 1954. He stopped his football career in 1950, after winning two Tunisian championship titles in 1957 and in 1960 with the Stade Tunisien.

In 1957, he participated for the creation of the Algerian National Liberation Army football team (ALN Football Team) which resulted a year later in the creation of the FLN football team. He prepared tours, such as those of Syria, Iraq and Jordan.

He was a national manager of Tunisia national team from 1957 to 1960. He was thanked and honored in 1960 with a "Silver Medal" by the Tunisian Football Federation and the Ministry of Sports of Tunisia for the services rendered to Tunisian football.

He returned to Algeria after independence in 1962, and coached the two greatest clubs of the city of Oran, MC Oran and ASM Oran during the 1960s, 1970s and 1980s.

== Honours ==
=== Player ===
USM Oran

- Oran Championship: 1935
- North African Championship: Runners-up: 1935

Le Havre

- French Division 2: 1938

=== Coach ===
CS Hammam-Lif

- Tunisian National Championship: 1951, 1954, 1955, 1956
- Tunisian Cup: 1951, 1954, 1955

Tunisia

- Pan Arab Games: Runners-up: 1957

=== Individual ===
- Silver Medal: by the FTF and the Ministry of Sports of Tunisia: 1960
