= 1992–93 Tunisian National Championship =

Tunisian National Championship
- Season: 1992–93
- Champions: Espérance de Tunis
- Relegated: Sfax Railways Sports; AS Kasserine
- Cup of Champions: Espérance de Tunis
- Cup Winners' Cup: Olympique Béja
- CAF Cup: JS Kairouanaise
- Matches: 182
- Goals: 408 (2.24 per match)
- Top goalscorer: Abdelkader Ben Hassen; Kenneth Malitoli (18 goals)
- Biggest home win: CSHL 5–0 JSK
- Biggest away win: ASM 1–4 EST; USM 1–4 EST
- Highest scoring: USM 6–5 ESS

The 1992–93 Tunisian National Championship season was the 38th season of top-tier football in Tunisia.

== Results ==
=== League table ===
Pos	Team	Pld	W	D	L	GF	GA	GD	Pts	Qualification or relegation
1	Espérance de Tunis	26	18	7	1	43	15	+28	43	Qualification to the 1994 African Cup of Champions Clubs
2	JS Kairouanaise	26	13	6	7	34	27	+7	32	Qualification to the 1994 CAF Cup
3	CA Bizertin	26	10	7	9	34	30	+4	27	
4	CS Hammam-Lif	26	10	6	10	26	24	+2	26	
5	Club Africain	26	7	11	8	27	26	+1	25	
6	Olympique Béja	26	8	8	10	30	31	−1	24 (Note: In the games between these six teams, Olympique Béja got 12 points, CS Sfaxien 11 (GD +1), US Monastir 11 (GD -4), OC Kerkennah 10, AS Marsa 9 and Étoile du Sahel 7. See the Result table below for more details.)	Qualification to the 1994 African Cup Winners' Cup
7	CS Sfaxien	26	8	8	10	28	31	−3	24	
8	US Monastir	26	8	8	10	21	33	−12	24	
9	Océano Club de Kerkennah	26	9	6	11	32	33	−1	24	
10	AS Marsa	26	8	8	10	25	29	−4	24	
11	Étoile du Sahel	26	9	6	11	30	32	−2	24	
12	Stade Tunisien	26	7	9	10	28	29	−1	23 (Note: Stade Tunisien ahead on head-to-head record: Stade Tunisien 1-0 Sfax Railways Sports, Sfax Railways Sports 0-0 Stade Tunisien.)	
13	Sfax Railways Sports	26	8	7	11	29	30	−1	23	Relegation to the Ligue 2
14	AS Kasserine	26	7	7	12	21	38	−17	21	Relegation to the Ligue 2

Source: Championnat National
Rules for classification: 1) points; 2) goal difference; 3) number of goals scored.

=== Result table ===
Home \ Away	ASK	ASM	CA	CAB	CSHL	CSS	EST	ESS	JSK	OCK	OB	SRS	ST	USM
AS Kasserine	—	3–1	0–0	1–1	1–0	1–1	1–1	2–0	0–0	0–0	3–2	1–0	1–0	1–0
AS Marsa	3–1	—	0–0	0–0	2–0	3–0	1–4	1–1	1–0	3–1	1–0	2–1	1–1	0–0
Club Africain	2–0	1–1	—	0–2	0–0	2–0	2–2	1–0	2–1	1–1	4–0	0–0	1–2	2–0
CA Bizertin	4–2	2–1	2–0	—	2–0	2–2	0–1	1–0	3–3	1–0	1–1	1–0	1–1	0–2
CS Hammam-Lif	4–0	1–1	2–1	0–2	—	0–0	0–0	4–0	5–0	2–0	1–0	3–2	1–0	1–0
CS Sfaxien	2–1	2–0	0–0	1–1	1–2	—	0–2	1–1	2–0	2–4	3–0	1–2	2–2	1–0
Espérance de Tunis	1–0	2–1	2–1	2–1	2–0	0–0	—	1–0	1–0	3–1	1–0	3–1	1–0	1–1
Étoile du Sahel	0–0	0–0	3–1	3–1	2–0	1–2	1–0	—	1–0	3–2	0–1	1–0	1–2	1–1
JS Kairouan	3–0	1–0	3–1	1–0	1–0	2–1	2–2	1–0	—	2–1	3–2	4–1	1–0	2–0
Océano Club de Kerkennah	2–1	2–0	1–2	2–1	0–0	1–2	1–1	1–0	2–1	—	2–1	0–0	3–1	3–0
Olympique Béja	5–1	1–0	0–0	1–0	3–0	1–0	0–1	1–1	1–1	2–1	—	2–2	2–2	4–0
Sfax Railways Sports	1–0	3–0	2–1	4–3	3–0	2–0	0–2	1–3	0–1	1–1	0–0	—	0–0	3–0
Stade Tunisien	3–0	1–2	2–2	2–0	0–0	0–2	0–3	1–2	0–0	2–0	3–0	1–0	—	2–3
US Monastir	2–0	1–0	0–0	0–2	1–0	1–0	1–4	6–5	1–1	1–0	0–0	0–0	0–0	—

Source: Championnat National
Legend: Blue = home team win; Yellow = draw; Red = away team win.
