= 1978–79 Tunisian National Championship =

Tunisian National Championship
- Season: 1978–79
- Champions: Club Africain
- Relegated: Club Olympique des Transports; Stade Sportif Sfaxien
- Matches: 182
- Goals: 374 (2.05 per match)
- Top goalscorer: Mahmoud Tebourski (Olympique du Kef) (13 goals)

The 1978–79 Tunisian National Championship was the twenty-fourth season of the Tunisian national football championship following the country's independence in 1956. The competition was won by Club Africain, who finished 1 point ahead of Stade Tunisien in the final standings. It was Club Africain's fifth league title since independence. The defending champions, Club Sportif Sfaxien, finished fifth.

The league was contested by 14 clubs, each playing 26 matches. Club Olympique des Transports and Stade Sportif Sfaxien were relegated at the end of the campaign, while Club Sportif Menzel Bouzelfa and Stade Gabésien were promoted for the following season.

== League table ==
Pos	Team	Pld	W	D	L	GF	GA	GD	Pts
1	Club Africain (C)	26	15	8	3	28	12	+16	64
2	Stade Tunisien	26	14	9	3	36	21	+15	63
3	Étoile du Sahel	26	14	7	5	34	13	+21	61
4	Espérance de Tunis	26	12	9	5	38	24	+14	59
5	Club Sportif Sfaxien	26	8	9	9	27	27	0	51
6	Olympique du Kef	26	9	7	10	31	27	+4	51
7	Avenir Sportif de La Marsa	26	8	8	10	31	31	0	50
8	CA Bizertin	26	7	9	10	19	25	−6	49
9	JS Kairouan	26	8	7	11	24	31	−7	49
10	CS Hammam-Lif	26	8	7	11	23	30	−7	49
11	Océano Club de Kerkennah	26	6	11	9	17	24	−7	49
12	Sfax Railways Sports	26	5	12	9	24	25	−1	48
13	Club Olympique des Transports (R)	26	6	10	10	24	33	−9	48
14	Stade Sportif Sfaxien (R)	26	2	7	17	18	51	−33	37

Source: RSSSF
Rules for classification: 1) points (3 for a win, 2 for a draw, 1 for a defeat).
(C) = Champions; (R) = Relegated.

== Top scorers ==
Mahmoud Tebourski of Olympique du Kef was the league's top scorer with 13 goals.

== See also ==
- 1977–78 Tunisian National Championship
- 1979–80 Tunisian National Championship
- Tunisian Ligue Professionnelle 1
- Tunisian Cup
