= 1979–80 Tunisian National Championship =

Tunisian National Championship
- Season: 1979–80
- Champions: Club Africain
- Relegated: Club Sportif Menzel Bouzelfa; Olympique du Kef
- Matches: 182
- Goals: 374 (2.05 per match)
- Top goalscorer: Hédi Bayari (Club Africain) (14 goals)

The 1979–80 Tunisian National Championship was the twenty-fifth season of the Tunisian national football championship following the country's independence in 1956. The competition was won by the defending champions Club Africain, who finished five points ahead of Espérance Sportive de Tunis in the final standings. It was Club Africain's sixth league title since independence and their second in a row.

The league was contested by 14 clubs, each playing 26 matches. Club Sportif Menzel Bouzelfa and Olympique du Kef were relegated at the end of the campaign, while Club Olympique des Transports and Union Sportive Monastir were promoted for the following season.

== League table ==
Pos	Team	Pld	W	D	L	GF	GA	GD	Pts
1	Club Africain (C)	26	15	9	2	37	7	+30	65
2	Espérance de Tunis	26	9	16	1	32	16	+16	60
3	Étoile du Sahel	26	11	11	4	31	18	+13	59
4	Stade Tunisien	26	10	12	4	38	23	+15	58
5	Club Sportif Sfaxien	26	10	12	4	25	20	+5	58
6	Avenir Sportif de La Marsa	26	7	11	8	28	27	+1	51
7	CS Hammam-Lif	26	6	12	8	31	33	−2	50
8	CA Bizertin	26	6	11	9	24	24	0	49
9	Océano Club de Kerkennah	26	5	13	8	18	29	−11	49
10	JS Kairouan	26	7	8	11	21	30	−9	48
11	Sfax Railways Sports	26	7	7	12	22	33	−11	47
12	Stade Gabésien	26	6	8	12	33	51	−18	46
13	Club Sportif Menzel Bouzelfa (R)	26	3	13	10	21	31	−10	45
14	Olympique du Kef (R)	26	4	9	13	13	32	−19	43

Source: RSSSF
Rules for classification: 1) points (3 for a win, 2 for a draw, 1 for a defeat).
(C) = Champions; (R) = Relegated.

== Top scorers ==
Hédi Bayari of Club Africain was the league's top scorer with 14 goals.

== See also ==
- 1978–79 Tunisian National Championship
- 1980–81 Tunisian National Championship
- Tunisian Ligue Professionnelle 1
- Tunisian Cup
