= 1980–81 Tunisian National Championship =

Tunisian National Championship
- Season: 1980–81
- Champions: Club Sportif Sfaxien
- Relegated: Club Olympique des Transports; Stade Gabésien
- Matches: 182
- Goals: 373 (2.05 per match)
- Top goalscorer: Habib Gasmi (Club Africain) (16 goals)

The 1980–81 Tunisian National Championship was the twenty-sixth season of the Tunisian national football championship following the country's independence in 1956. The competition was won by Club Sportif Sfaxien, who finished two points ahead of the defending champions Club Africain in the final standings. It was Club Sportif Sfaxien's fourth league title since independence.

The league was contested by 14 clubs, each playing 26 matches. Club Olympique des Transports and Stade Gabésien were relegated at the end of the campaign, while Association Sportive Mégrine and El Makarem de Mahdia were promoted for the following season.

== League table ==
Pos	Team	Pld	W	D	L	GF	GA	GD	Pts
1	Club Sportif Sfaxien (C)	26	16	7	3	33	19	+14	65
2	Club Africain	26	16	5	5	46	14	+32	63
3	Espérance de Tunis	26	16	3	7	39	21	+18	61
4	Étoile du Sahel	26	12	9	5	32	20	+12	59
5	CA Bizertin	26	12	5	9	32	25	+7	55
6	JS Kairouan	26	10	9	7	28	21	+7	55
7	Stade Tunisien	26	11	6	9	33	27	+6	54
8	Avenir Sportif de La Marsa	26	7	9	10	25	26	−1	49
9	Union Sportive Monastir	26	8	7	11	24	28	−4	49
10	CS Hammam-Lif	26	9	5	12	19	30	−11	49
11	Sfax Railways Sports	26	5	10	11	19	29	−10	46
12	Océano Club de Kerkennah	26	5	9	12	18	23	−5	45
13	Club Olympique des Transports (R)	26	5	7	14	16	35	−19	43
14	Stade Gabésien (R)	26	3	3	20	9	55	−46	35

Source: RSSSF
Rules for classification: 1) points (3 for a win, 2 for a draw, 1 for a defeat).
(C) = Champions; (R) = Relegated.

== Top scorers ==
Habib Gasmi of Club Africain was the league's top scorer with 16 goals.

== See also ==
- 1979–80 Tunisian National Championship
- 1981–82 Tunisian National Championship
- Tunisian Ligue Professionnelle 1
- Tunisian Cup
