= 1957–58 Tunisian National Championship =

Tunisian National Championship
- Season: 1957–58
- Champions: Étoile Sportive du Sahel
- Relegated: USM Menzel Bourguiba; Patrie Football Club Bizertin; US Musulmane Olympique
- Matches: 210
- Goals: 698 (3.32 per match)
- Top goalscorer: Boubaker Haddad (CA Bizertin); Habib Mougou (Étoile du Sahel) (28 goals each)

The 1957–58 Tunisian National Championship was the third season of the Tunisian national football championship following the country's independence in 1956. The competition was won by Étoile Sportive du Sahel, who finished three points ahead of Espérance Sportive de Tunis in the final standings. It was Étoile du Sahel's first league title since independence. Stade Tunisien, the previous season's champions, finished third.

The league was contested by 15 clubs, each playing 28 matches. USM Menzel Bourguiba, Patrie Football Club Bizertin and US Musulmane Olympique were relegated at the end of the campaign, while Olympique du Kef and Stade Gabésien were promoted for the following season.

== League table ==
Pos	Team	Pld	W	D	L	GF	GA	GD	Pts
1	Étoile du Sahel (C)	28	17	8	3	66	28	+38	70
2	Espérance de Tunis	28	16	7	5	57	35	+22	67
3	Stade Tunisien	28	15	6	7	61	35	+26	64
4	U. Sp. Tunisienne	28	14	8	6	63	40	+23	64
5	CA Bizertin	28	11	8	9	53	37	+16	58
6	Club Africain	28	10	9	9	45	34	+11	57
7	Stade Populaire	28	8	12	8	46	45	+1	56
8	CS Hammam-Lif	28	10	7	11	53	47	+6	55
9	Sfax Railways Sports	28	10	7	11	41	44	−3	55
10	Stade Soussien	28	10	7	11	31	41	−10	55
11	J. Sp. Methouienne	28	8	10	10	44	50	−6	54
12	Club Tunisien	28	10	6	12	32	45	−13	54
13	USM Menzel Bourguiba (R)	28	10	3	15	47	73	−26	51
14	Patrie Football Club Bizertin (R)	28	4	5	19	27	68	−41	41
15	US Musulmane Olympique (R)	28	4	3	21	32	76	−44	39

Source: RSSSF
Rules for classification: 1) points (3 for a win, 2 for a draw, 1 for a defeat).
(C) = Champions; (R) = Relegated.

== Top scorers ==
According to Kawarji's historical championship honours list, Boubaker Haddad of CA Bizertin and Habib Mougou of Étoile Sportive du Sahel shared the top-scorer honour, with 28 goals each.

== See also ==
- 1956–57 Tunisian National Championship
- 1958–59 Tunisian National Championship
- Tunisian Ligue Professionnelle 1
- Tunisian Cup
