= 1975–76 Tunisian National Championship =

Tunisian National Championship
- Season: 1975–76
- Champions: Espérance Sportive de Tunis
- Relegated: El Makarem de Mahdia; Club Sportif Cheminots
- Matches: 182
- Goals: 412 (2.26 per match)
- Top goalscorer: Abderraouf Ben Aziza (Étoile du Sahel) (20 goals)

The 1975–76 Tunisian National Championship was the twenty-first season of the Tunisian national football championship following the country's independence in 1956. The competition was won by the defending champions Espérance Sportive de Tunis, who finished level on 62 points with Étoile Sportive du Sahel and won the title after a play-off between the two. It was Espérance's fifth league title since independence and their second in a row.

The league was contested by 14 clubs, each playing 26 matches. El Makarem de Mahdia and Club Sportif Cheminots were relegated at the end of the campaign. Stade Tunisien, who finished 12th, won a play-off against Stade Africain de Menzel Bourguiba and stayed in the division. Association Sportive Mégrine and Union Sportive Monastir were promoted for the following season.

== League table ==
Pos	Team	Pld	W	D	L	GF	GA	GD	Pts
1	Espérance de Tunis (C)	26	14	8	4	36	20	+16	62
2	Étoile du Sahel	26	13	10	3	43	25	+18	62
3	Club Africain	26	12	10	4	32	21	+11	60
4	CA Bizertin	26	9	14	3	32	22	+10	58
5	JS Kairouan	26	11	9	6	34	24	+10	57
6	Club Sportif Sfaxien	26	9	12	5	36	25	+11	56
7	Sfax Railways Sports	26	13	3	10	33	28	+5	55
8	Avenir Sportif de La Marsa	26	8	10	8	30	26	+4	52
9	Club Olympique des Transports	26	8	7	11	26	31	−5	49
10	CS Hammam-Lif	26	7	8	11	22	32	−10	48
11	Olympique du Kef	26	5	11	10	19	33	−14	47
12	Stade Tunisien	26	5	10	11	28	34	−6	46
13	El Makarem de Mahdia (R)	26	4	7	15	17	34	−17	41
14	Club Sportif Cheminots (R)	26	2	5	19	24	57	−33	35

Source: RSSSF
Rules for classification: 1) points (3 for a win, 2 for a draw, 1 for a defeat).
(C) = Champions; (R) = Relegated.
Note: Espérance Sportive de Tunis and Étoile du Sahel finished level on points and played a play-off for the title.
Note: Stade Tunisien won a play-off against Stade Africain de Menzel Bourguiba to avoid relegation.

== Top scorers ==
Abderraouf Ben Aziza of Étoile du Sahel was the league's top scorer with 20 goals.

== See also ==
- 1974–75 Tunisian National Championship
- 1976–77 Tunisian National Championship
- Tunisian Ligue Professionnelle 1
- Tunisian Cup
