= 1984–85 Tunisian National Championship =

Tunisian National Championship
- Season: 1984–85
- Champions: Espérance Sportive de Tunis
- Relegated: Stade Sportif Sfaxien; Avenir Sportif de Gabès
- Matches: 182
- Goals: 363 (1.99 per match)
- Top goalscorer: Faouzi Henchiri (Club Olympique des Transports) (9 goals)

The 1984–85 Tunisian National Championship was the thirtieth season of the Tunisian national football championship following the country's independence in 1956. The competition was won by Espérance Sportive de Tunis, who finished one point ahead of Club Africain in the final standings. It was Espérance's seventh league title since independence. The defending champions, CA Bizertin, finished ninth.

The league was contested by 14 clubs, each playing 26 matches. Stade Sportif Sfaxien and Avenir Sportif de Gabès were relegated at the end of the campaign, while Olympique de Béja and STIA Sousse were promoted for the following season. RSSSF notes that Océano Club de Kerkennah played in the top division the following season in place of Club Olympique des Transports.

== League table ==
Pos	Team	Pld	W	D	L	GF	GA	GD	Pts
1	Espérance de Tunis (C)	26	15	8	3	32	15	+17	64
2	Club Africain	26	14	9	3	34	13	+21	63
3	CS Hammam-Lif	26	11	8	7	30	24	+6	56
4	Étoile du Sahel	26	11	8	7	24	19	+5	56
5	JS Kairouan	26	11	8	7	30	15	+15	54
6	Stade Tunisien	26	9	7	10	20	21	−1	51
7	Club Sportif Sfaxien	26	8	8	10	29	31	−2	50
8	Sfax Railways Sports	26	7	10	9	20	22	−2	50
9	CA Bizertin	26	7	10	9	25	28	−3	50
10	Union Sportive Monastir	26	8	7	11	28	34	−6	49
11	Avenir Sportif de La Marsa	26	6	10	10	25	25	0	48
12	Club Olympique des Transports	26	7	7	12	29	38	−9	47
13	Stade Sportif Sfaxien (R)	26	7	5	14	20	33	−13	45
14	Avenir Sportif de Gabès (R)	26	5	7	14	17	45	−28	43

Source: RSSSF
Rules for classification: 1) points (3 for a win, 2 for a draw, 1 for a defeat).
(C) = Champions; (R) = Relegated.
Note: JS Kairouan lost two matches by award, against Stade Tunisien and Étoile du Sahel; RSSSF's points total for the club is two lower than its results alone give.
Note: Océano Club de Kerkennah played in the top division the following season in place of Club Olympique des Transports.

== Top scorers ==
Faouzi Henchiri of Club Olympique des Transports was the league's top scorer with 9 goals.

== See also ==
- 1983–84 Tunisian National Championship
- 1985–86 Tunisian National Championship
- Tunisian Ligue Professionnelle 1
- Tunisian Cup
