= 1994–95 Tunisian Ligue Professionnelle 1 =

Tunisian Ligue Professionnelle 1
- Season: 1994–95
- Champions: CS Sfaxien
- Relegated: OC Kerkennah; Sfax Railways
- Cup of Champions: CS Sfaxien
- Cup Winners' Cup: Olympique Béja
- CAF Cup: Étoile du Sahel
- Matches: 182
- Goals: 443 (2.43 per match)
- Top goalscorer: Belhassan Aloui (18 goals)
- Biggest home win: CSHL 6–2 CAB
- Biggest away win: ASM 0–6 ESS
- Highest scoring: CSHL 6–2 CAB

The 1994–95 Tunisian Ligue Professionnelle 1 season was the 40th season of top-tier football in Tunisia.

== Results ==
=== League table ===
Pos	Team	Pld	W	D	L	GF	GA	GD	Pts	Qualification or relegation
1	CS Sfaxien	26	17	4	5	40	16	+24	38	Qualification to the 1996 African Cup of Champions Clubs
2	Espérance de Tunis	26	16	5	5	52	23	+29	37	
3	Étoile du Sahel	26	16	5	5	49	25	+24	37	Qualification to the 1996 CAF Cup
4	Club Africain	26	13	7	6	34	23	+11	33	
5	Olympique Béja	26	10	6	10	31	28	+3	26	Qualification to the 1996 African Cup Winners' Cup
6	Olympique du Kef	26	9	7	10	29	32	−3	25	
7	ES Zarzis	26	7	9	10	19	31	−12	23	
8	AS Marsa	26	8	7	11	31	44	−13	23	
9	Stade Tunisien	26	7	8	11	30	36	−6	22	
10	CA Bizertin	26	8	6	12	22	33	−11	22	
11	JS Kairouan	26	8	6	12	22	30	−8	22	
12	CS Hammam-Lif	26	8	4	14	40	47	−7	20	
13	Océano Club de Kerkennah	26	5	8	13	23	36	−13	18	Relegation to the Ligue 2
14	Sfax Railways Sports	26	7	4	15	21	39	−18	18	Relegation to the Ligue 2

Source: Ligue 1
Rules for classification: 1) points; 2) goal difference; 3) number of goals scored.

=== Result table ===
Home \ Away	ASM	CA	CAB	CSHL	CSS	EST	ESZ	ESS	JSK	OCK	OB	OK	SRS	ST
AS Marsa	—	1–2	3–2	2–2	1–1	1–2	0–1	0–6	2–1	2–1	1–1	2–1	2–0	2–0
Club Africain	1–1	—	2–0	1–1	3–1	1–1	1–1	1–3	3–1	1–0	2–1	0–1	3–1	1–0
CA Bizertin	1–2	0–0	—	1–0	0–2	1–1	1–2	0–1	1–0	2–0	0–1	1–0	2–0	2–0
CS Hammam-Lif	1–0	0–2	6–2	—	0–1	2–5	1–0	0–1	1–1	3–2	0–1	2–1	4–1	2–2
CS Sfaxien	4–1	1–0	2–1	2–0	—	1–0	0–0	4–0	0–1	1–0	0–1	3–0	0–2	2–1
Espérance de Tunis	3–0	4–0	1–0	3–2	1–2	—	2–0	3–1	0–0	2–1	2–0	1–1	5–1	2–0
ES Zarzis	0–1	0–0	0–0	1–4	0–4	0–1	—	1–3	3–0	1–1	0–0	1–0	2–0	2–1
Étoile du Sahel	3–0	1–0	3–1	3–0	1–1	1–0	3–0	—	2–1	3–3	3–1	2–1	2–3	4–1
JS Kairouan	2–1	0–1	0–1	1–0	3–2	2–1	2–1	0–0	—	1–0	0–1	3–1	1–0	1–2
Océano Club de Kerkennah	0–0	1–1	0–0	0–2	1–2	0–4	0–0	1–0	1–0	—	1–2	2–2	1–1	1–1
Olympique Béja	1–2	1–1	3–0	5–2	0–1	1–2	1–2	0–1	3–1	2–1	—	1–1	0–2	3–1
Olympique du Kef	2–0	0–3	2–2	3–0	1–0	0–2	2–0	0–0	1–0	2–1	1–1	—	1–0	2–2
Sfax Railways Sports	3–0	0–2	0–1	3–2	0–1	0–2	3–0	2–1	0–0	0–1	1–0	1–0	—	0–0
Stade Tunisien	0–0	1–2	3–0	2–1	0–0	3–2	0–0	1–1	2–0	1–2	1–0	1–2	1–0	—

Source: Ligue 1
Legend: Blue = home team win; Yellow = draw; Red = away team win.
