= 1985–86 Tunisian National Championship =

Tunisian National Championship
- Season: 1985–86
- Champions: Étoile Sportive du Sahel
- Relegated: STIA Sousse
- Matches: 182
- Goals: 325 (1.79 per match)
- Top goalscorer: Nabil Tasco (CS Hammam-Lif) (12 goals)

The 1985–86 Tunisian National Championship was the thirty-first season of the Tunisian national football championship following the country's independence in 1956. The competition was won by Étoile Sportive du Sahel, who finished six points ahead of the defending champions Espérance Sportive de Tunis in the final standings. It was Étoile du Sahel's fifth league title since independence.

The league was contested by 14 clubs, each playing 26 matches. STIA Sousse finished bottom and was the only club relegated, while Club Olympique des Transports was promoted for the following season.

== League table ==
Pos	Team	Pld	W	D	L	GF	GA	GD	Pts
1	Étoile du Sahel (C)	26	12	13	1	31	18	+13	63
2	Espérance de Tunis	26	9	13	4	30	17	+13	57
3	Club Africain	26	9	12	5	29	20	+9	56
4	Club Sportif Sfaxien	26	7	12	7	29	25	+4	52
5	Stade Tunisien	26	8	10	8	24	22	+2	52
6	Sfax Railways Sports	26	8	10	8	19	15	+4	52
7	JS Kairouan	26	6	14	6	23	21	+2	52
8	Avenir Sportif de La Marsa	26	9	7	10	24	31	−7	51
9	CS Hammam-Lif	26	7	11	8	22	20	+2	51
10	CA Bizertin	26	9	7	10	21	20	+1	51
11	Union Sportive Monastir	26	8	9	9	21	23	−2	51
12	Océano Club de Kerkennah	26	6	12	8	21	32	−11	50
13	Olympique de Béja	26	4	13	9	14	30	−16	47
14	STIA Sousse (R)	26	5	7	14	17	31	−14	43

Source: RSSSF
Rules for classification: 1) points (3 for a win, 2 for a draw, 1 for a defeat).
(C) = Champions; (R) = Relegated.

== Top scorers ==
Nabil Tasco of CS Hammam-Lif was the league's top scorer with 12 goals.

== See also ==
- 1984–85 Tunisian National Championship
- 1986–87 Tunisian National Championship
- Tunisian Ligue Professionnelle 1
- Tunisian Cup
