= 1991–92 Tunisian National Championship =

Tunisian National Championship
- Season: 1991–92
- Champions: Club Africain
- Relegated: ES Zarzis; CO Transports
- Cup of Champions: Club Africain
- Cup Winners' Cup: Stade Tunisien
- Matches: 182
- Goals: 390 (2.14 per match)
- Top goalscorer: Amor Ben Tahar; Hechmi Sassi (14 goals)
- Biggest home win: CA 4–0 JSK; CAB 4–0 COT; ST 4–0 CSS; ST 5–1 ESZ
- Biggest away win: COT 0–7 CA
- Highest scoring: COT 0–7 CA; CAB 5–2 OCK; ESS 4–3 ST

The 1991–92 Tunisian National Championship season was the 37th season of top-tier football in Tunisia.

== Results ==
=== League table ===
Pos	Team	Pld	W	D	L	GF	GA	GD	Pts	Qualification or relegation
1	Club Africain	26	18	4	4	50	14	+36	84	Qualification to the 1993 African Cup of Champions Clubs
2	CA Bizertin	26	18	3	5	42	13	+29	83	
3	Espérance de Tunis	26	11	8	7	28	17	+11	67	
4	AS Marsa	26	10	7	9	22	23	−1	63	
5	Étoile du Sahel	26	9	9	8	36	33	+3	62	
6	Olympique Béja	26	10	6	10	25	31	−6	62	
7	Océano Club de Kerkennah	26	9	6	11	27	31	−4	59	
8	Stade Tunisien	26	8	9	9	38	36	+2	59	Qualification to the 1993 African Cup Winners' Cup (Note: Stade Tunisien qualified to 1993 African Cup Winners' Cup after losing the final of the 1991–92 Tunisian Cup against Club Africain, the season champion.)
9	CS Sfaxien	26	8	7	11	26	33	−7	57	
10	CS Hammam-Lif	26	7	10	9	23	25	−2	57	
11	JS Kairouan	26	6	11	9	18	26	−8	55	
12	US Monastir	26	5	11	10	17	27	−10	52	
13	ES Zarzis	26	6	6	14	23	41	−18	50	Relegation to the Ligue 2
14	CO Transports	26	6	5	15	15	40	−25	49	Relegation to the Ligue 2

Source: Championnat National
Rules for classification: 1) points; 2) goal difference; 3) number of goals scored.

=== Result table ===
Home \ Away	ASM	CA	CAB	COT	CSHL	CSS	EST	ESZ	ESS	JSK	OCK	OB	ST	USM
AS Marsa	—	1–3	1–0	2–1	0–0	2–1	3–1	2–1	2–1	1–0	2–0	0–0	1–1	0–0
Club Africain	3–0	—	1–0	3–0	3–0	1–0	1–3	0–0	1–0	4–0	1–0	2–0	3–0	2–0
CA Bizertin	1–0	3–1	—	4–0	1–0	2–3	2–0	1–0	3–0	3–0	5–2	2–0	0–2	2–0
Club Olympique des Transports	0–1	0–7	0–1	—	1–0	2–1	0–3	1–1	0–2	0–0	0–0	1–0	2–4	0–0
CS Hammam-Lif	1–0	1–3	0–2	1–0	—	1–2	0–0	3–1	2–0	0–0	3–0	0–1	1–1	1–0
CS Sfaxien	3–0	1–3	0–1	1–0	1–0	—	0–3	3–2	0–0	1–1	0–1	1–0	1–1	1–1
ES Tunis	1–0	0–0	1–0	1–0	1–0	0–0	—	3–0	1–1	0–2	3–1	0–0	1–1	3–0
ES Zarzis	2–1	1–0	0–2	1–0	1–1	1–0	0–1	—	2–2	0–0	1–0	2–3	2–1	1–1
Étoile du Sahel	0–0	0–1	1–1	2–2	2–2	1–1	1–0	2–1	—	2–1	1–2	4–1	4–3	3–0
JS Kairouan	1–0	0–2	0–0	0–1	1–1	3–1	0–0	2–0	1–2	—	1–0	2–2	0–0	1–0
Océano Club de Kerkennah	1–1	1–3	0–1	2–1	1–1	1–1	2–1	2–0	0–1	0–0	—	3–0	1–1	1–0
Olympique Béja	1–0	2–1	0–0	0–1	1–1	1–3	1–0	3–2	2–1	3–1	1–0	—	0–1	1–1
Stade Tunisien	0–2	1–1	0–1	2–0	1–2	4–0	2–1	5–1	3–2	1–1	1–4	1–2	—	0–0
US Monastir	0–0	0–0	1–4	1–2	1–1	1–0	0–0	2–0	1–1	2–0	1–2	1–0	3–1	—

Updated to match(es) played on unknown. Source: Championnat National
Legend: Blue = home team win; Yellow = draw; Red = away team win.
