= 1981–82 Tunisian National Championship =

Tunisian National Championship
- Season: 1981–82
- Champions: Espérance Sportive de Tunis
- Relegated: Association Sportive Mégrine; El Makarem de Mahdia
- Matches: 182
- Goals: 389 (2.14 per match)
- Top goalscorer: Riadh El Fahem (Espérance de Tunis) (13 goals)

The 1981–82 Tunisian National Championship was the twenty-seventh season of the Tunisian national football championship following the country's independence in 1956. The competition was won by Espérance Sportive de Tunis, who finished six points ahead of Club Africain in the final standings. It was Espérance's sixth league title since independence. The defending champions, Club Sportif Sfaxien, finished fifth.

The league was contested by 14 clubs, each playing 26 matches. Association Sportive Mégrine and El Makarem de Mahdia were relegated at the end of the campaign, while Club Sportif Korba and Stade Gabésien were promoted for the following season.

== League table ==
Pos	Team	Pld	W	D	L	GF	GA	GD	Pts
1	Espérance de Tunis (C)	26	14	10	2	42	12	+30	64
2	Club Africain	26	11	10	5	35	19	+16	58
3	Étoile du Sahel	26	10	9	7	35	20	+15	55
4	Stade Tunisien	26	8	12	6	27	23	+4	54
5	Club Sportif Sfaxien	26	9	10	7	26	22	+4	54
6	JS Kairouan	26	8	10	8	29	42	−13	52
7	Avenir Sportif de La Marsa	26	8	9	9	25	34	−9	51
8	CA Bizertin	26	9	6	11	34	32	+2	50
9	CS Hammam-Lif	26	7	10	9	35	40	−5	50
10	Sfax Railways Sports	26	6	12	8	22	25	−3	50
11	Union Sportive Monastir	26	7	9	10	18	22	−4	49
12	Océano Club de Kerkennah	26	7	9	10	15	25	−10	49
13	Association Sportive Mégrine (R)	26	6	10	10	23	32	−9	48
14	El Makarem de Mahdia (R)	26	4	10	12	23	41	−18	44

Source: RSSSF
Rules for classification: 1) points (3 for a win, 2 for a draw, 1 for a defeat).
(C) = Champions; (R) = Relegated.

== Top scorers ==
Riadh El Fahem of Espérance de Tunis was the league's top scorer with 13 goals.

== See also ==
- 1980–81 Tunisian National Championship
- 1982–83 Tunisian National Championship
- Tunisian Ligue Professionnelle 1
- Tunisian Cup
