= 1983–84 Tunisian National Championship =

Tunisian National Championship
- Season: 1983–84
- Champions: CA Bizertin
- Relegated: Stade Soussien; Stade Gabésien
- Matches: 182
- Goals: 365 (2.01 per match)
- Top goalscorer: Hédi Bayari (Club Africain) (12 goals)

The 1983–84 Tunisian National Championship was the twenty-ninth season of the Tunisian national football championship following the country's independence in 1956. The competition was won by CA Bizertin, who finished level on 62 points with Stade Tunisien and won the title on the goal difference of the first-leg ("aller") matches. It was CA Bizertin's first league title since independence. The defending champions, Club Sportif Sfaxien, finished eighth.

The league was contested by 14 clubs, each playing 26 matches. Stade Gabésien finished bottom and was relegated. Stade Soussien and Union Sportive Monastir finished level on 45 points, and Stade Soussien was relegated on the goal difference of the first-leg matches (−9 against −4). Club Olympique des Transports and Avenir Sportif de Gabès were promoted for the following season.

== League table ==
Pos	Team	Pld	W	D	L	GF	GA	GD	Pts
1	CA Bizertin (C)	26	14	8	4	36	12	+24	62
2	Stade Tunisien	26	12	12	2	28	9	+19	62
3	Étoile du Sahel	26	13	9	4	39	21	+18	61
4	Club Africain	26	13	9	4	34	19	+15	61
5	Espérance de Tunis	26	12	8	6	28	15	+13	58
6	JS Kairouan	26	10	10	6	35	20	+15	56
7	CS Hammam-Lif	26	8	8	10	18	26	−8	50
8	Club Sportif Sfaxien	26	8	7	11	19	21	−2	49
9	Avenir Sportif de La Marsa	26	6	10	10	27	38	−11	48
10	Stade Sportif Sfaxien	26	6	9	11	24	32	−8	47
11	Sfax Railways Sports	26	6	8	12	18	27	−9	46
12	Union Sportive Monastir	26	5	9	12	25	30	−5	45
13	Stade Soussien (R)	26	7	5	14	19	31	−12	45
14	Stade Gabésien (R)	26	4	4	18	15	64	−49	38

Source: RSSSF
Rules for classification: 1) points (3 for a win, 2 for a draw, 1 for a defeat). 2) goal difference in the first-leg ("aller") matches.
(C) = Champions; (R) = Relegated.
Note: CA Bizertin were champions on the goal difference of the first-leg ("aller") matches (+16 against +13 for Stade Tunisien).
Note: Stade Soussien were relegated on the same criterion (−9 against −4 for Union Sportive Monastir).

== Top scorers ==
Hédi Bayari of Club Africain was the league's top scorer with 12 goals.

== See also ==
- 1982–83 Tunisian National Championship
- 1984–85 Tunisian National Championship
- Tunisian Ligue Professionnelle 1
- Tunisian Cup
