= 1995–96 Tunisian Ligue Professionnelle 1 =

Tunisian Ligue Professionnelle 1
- Season: 1995–96
- Champions: Club Africain
- Relegated: CS Hammam-Lif; AS Gabès
- Champions League: Club Africain
- Cup Winners' Cup: Étoile du Sahel
- CAF Cup: Espérance de Tunis
- Matches: 182
- Goals: 407 (2.24 per match)
- Top goalscorer: Sami Touati (17 goals)
- Biggest home win: CA 7–0 OK
- Biggest away win: ST 2–6 ESS
- Highest scoring: ST 2–6 ESS

The 1995–96 Tunisian Ligue Professionnelle 1 season was the 41st season of top-tier football in Tunisia.

== Results ==
=== League table ===
Pos	Team	Pld	W	D	L	GF	GA	GD	Pts	Qualification or relegation
1	Club Africain	26	19	6	1	49	7	+42	63	Qualification to the 1997 CAF Champions League
2	Étoile du Sahel	26	17	7	2	45	12	+33	58	Qualification to the 1997 African Cup Winners' Cup
3	Espérance de Tunis	26	15	7	4	36	21	+15	52	Qualification to the 1997 CAF Cup
4	CS Sfaxien	26	11	5	10	36	32	+4	38	
5	JS Kairouan	26	9	8	9	31	34	−3	35	
6	ES Zarzis	26	9	5	12	27	28	−1	32	
7	Olympique Béja	26	8	7	11	24	26	−2	31	
8	Stade Tunisien	26	9	3	14	24	32	−8	30	
9	CA Bizertin	26	7	9	10	21	30	−9	30	
10	AS Marsa	26	7	9	10	26	25	+1	30	
11	CO Transports	26	8	5	13	29	41	−12	29	
12	Olympique du Kef	26	6	8	12	22	45	−23	26	
13	CS Hammam-Lif	26	6	8	12	22	30	−8	26	Relegation to the Tunisian Ligue Professionnelle 2
14	AS Gabès	26	6	3	17	15	44	−29	21	Relegation to the Tunisian Ligue Professionnelle 2

Source: Ligue 1
Rules for classification: 1) points; 2) goal difference; 3) number of goals scored.

=== Result table ===
Home \ Away	ASG	ASM	CA	CAB	COT	CSHL	CSS	EST	ESZ	ESS	JSK	OB	OK	ST
AS Gabès	—	3–1	0–1	0–0	1–0	0–1	0–1	1–2	3–1	0–2	2–4	1–0	1–0	1–0
AS Marsa	0–0	—	1–1	1–1	4–0	1–0	2–0	0–1	2–0	1–1	3–1	2–0	0–0	0–1
Club Africain	5–0	3–0	—	1–0	3–0	2–0	4–0	0–0	2–0	0–0	4–0	0–0	7–0	1–0
CA Bizertin	2–0	0–0	0–1	—	0–0	1–2	1–2	0–0	2–1	1–1	2–1	1–0	1–0	1–0
CO Transports	2–0	1–5	2–3	4–2	—	1–0	2–3	1–2	1–0	0–1	2–0	3–2	0–0	0–1
CS Hammam-Lif	3–0	2–0	0–1	1–1	0–0	—	2–2	2–3	2–0	1–1	0–0	0–0	1–2	2–0
CS Sfaxien	3–0	1–0	1–3	2–0	1–1	2–0	—	3–0	0–0	0–1	2–2	0–1	6–0	2–1
ES Tunis	3–0	1–0	1–1	4–1	2–0	1–1	2–1	—	1–0	0–0	2–1	2–1	1–1	1–0
ES Zarzis	3–0	1–1	0–1	2–2	1–0	3–0	4–1	1–0	—	1–0	2–0	1–1	1–2	1–0
Étoile du Sahel	2–0	3–0	2–1	4–0	3–1	2–0	2–0	2–1	2–0	—	2–0	1–1	4–1	0–0
JS Kairouan	1–1	1–0	0–0	0–1	1–1	2–1	2–1	1–2	2–2	1–0	—	2–0	2–0	3–1
Olympique Béja	3–0	0–0	0–2	1–0	4–2	3–0	0–1	0–2	1–0	0–1	0–0	—	2–1	1–1
Olympique du Kef	2–0	1–1	0–1	1–0	1–3	1–1	1–1	2–2	0–1	0–2	1–1	3–2	—	1–0
Stade Tunisien	2–1	2–1	0–1	1–1	1–2	1–0	1–0	1–0	2–1	2–6	2–3	0–1	4–1	—

Source: Ligue 1
Legend: Blue = home team win; Yellow = draw; Red = away team win.
