= 1959–60 Tunisian National Championship =

Tunisian National Championship
- Season: 1959–60
- Champions: Espérance Sportive de Tunis
- Relegated: Sfax Railways Sports; Jeunesse Sportive Méthouienne
- Matches: 156
- Goals: 432 (2.77 per match)
- Top goalscorer: Abdelmajid Tlemçani (Espérance de Tunis) (22 goals)

The 1959–60 Tunisian National Championship was the fifth season of the Tunisian national football championship following the country's independence in 1956. The competition was won by the defending champions Espérance Sportive de Tunis, who finished ahead of Stade Tunisien in the final standings. It was Espérance's third league title overall and their second in a row.

The league was contested by 13 clubs, each playing 24 matches. Sfax Railways Sports and Jeunesse Sportive Méthouienne were relegated at the end of the campaign, while El Makarem de Mahdia was promoted for the following season.

== League table ==
Pos	Team	Pld	W	D	L	GF	GA	GD	Pts
1	Espérance de Tunis (C)	24	19	3	2	65	23	+42	65
2	Stade Tunisien	24	16	3	5	55	24	+31	59
3	Club Africain	24	8	11	5	24	22	+2	51
4	CS Hammam-Lif	24	11	5	8	38	34	+4	51
5	CA Bizertin	24	9	8	7	26	28	−2	50
6	Stade Populaire	24	7	9	8	30	32	−2	47
7	Étoile du Sahel	24	7	8	9	30	27	+3	46
8	Club Tunisien	24	6	10	8	25	29	−4	46
9	Avenir Musulman	24	8	6	10	28	33	−5	46
10	Stade Soussien	24	6	10	8	20	29	−9	46
11	U. Sp. Tunisienne	24	5	10	9	42	40	+2	44
12	Sfax Railways Sports (R)	24	4	5	15	25	54	−29	37
13	J. Sp. Methouienne (R)	24	2	8	14	24	57	−33	36

Source: RSSSF
Rules for classification: 1) points (3 for a win, 2 for a draw, 1 for a defeat).
(C) = Champions; (R) = Relegated.

== Top scorers ==
Abdelmajid Tlemçani of Espérance Sportive de Tunis was the league's top scorer for the second season running, with 22 goals.

== See also ==
- 1958–59 Tunisian National Championship
- 1960–61 Tunisian National Championship
- Tunisian Ligue Professionnelle 1
- Tunisian Cup
