= 1968–69 Tunisian National Championship =

Tunisian National Championship
- Season: 1968–69
- Champions: Club Sportif Sfaxien
- Relegated: Stade Sportif Sfaxien; Union Sportive Maghrébine
- Matches: 182
- Goals: 349 (1.92 per match)
- Top goalscorer: Mohamed Salah Jedidi (Club Africain) (17 goals)

The 1968–69 Tunisian National Championship was the fourteenth season of the Tunisian national football championship following the country's independence in 1956. The competition was won by Club Sportif Sfaxien, who finished 5 points ahead of Club Africain in the final standings. It was Club Sportif Sfaxien's first league title since independence. The defending champions, Sfax Railways Sports, finished fourth.

The league was expanded to 14 clubs, each playing 26 matches, after there were no relegations the previous season. Stade Sportif Sfaxien and Union Sportive Maghrébine were relegated at the end of the campaign, while Association Sportive Ariana and Union Sportive Tunisienne were promoted for the following season.

== League table ==
Pos	Team	Pld	W	D	L	GF	GA	GD	Pts
1	Club Sportif Sfaxien (C)	26	17	5	4	45	20	+25	65
2	Club Africain	26	12	10	4	26	12	+14	60
3	Avenir Sportif de La Marsa	26	14	5	7	37	20	+17	59
4	Sfax Railways Sports	26	12	7	7	33	22	+11	57
5	Étoile du Sahel	26	9	11	6	22	16	+6	55
6	Espérance de Tunis	26	8	10	8	28	28	0	52
7	CA Bizertin	26	6	14	6	17	21	−4	52
8	CS Hammam-Lif	26	7	9	10	18	24	−6	49
9	Club Olympique des Transports	26	6	11	9	23	32	−9	49
10	Stade Tunisien	26	5	12	9	22	23	−1	48
11	Club Sportif Cheminots	26	7	7	12	23	31	−8	47
12	Union Sportive Monastir	26	3	14	9	12	23	−11	46
13	Stade Sportif Sfaxien (R)	26	6	7	13	24	36	−12	45
14	Union Sportive Maghrébine (R)	26	4	10	12	19	41	−22	44

Source: RSSSF
Rules for classification: 1) points (3 for a win, 2 for a draw, 1 for a defeat).
(C) = Champions; (R) = Relegated.

== Top scorers ==
Mohamed Salah Jedidi of Club Africain was the league's top scorer with 17 goals.

== See also ==
- 1967–68 Tunisian National Championship
- 1969–70 Tunisian National Championship
- Tunisian Ligue Professionnelle 1
- Tunisian Cup
