= Amor Ben Tahar =

Tunisian footballer

Personal information
- Date of birth: January 1, 1969 (age 57)
- Position: Forward

Senior career*
Years	Team	Apps	(Gls)
1986–1995	OC Kerkennah		
1995–1999	CS Sfaxien		

International career
1987–1994	Tunisia	11	(2)
- * Club domestic league appearances and goals

Amor Ben Taher (Arabic: عُمَر بْن طَاهِر; born January 1, 1969) is a retired Tunisian footballer. He played as middle forward.

He was a player for the Océano Club de Kerkennah as well as the Club Sportif Sfaxien in 1995 and 1999. He won the Confederation Cup in 1998.

He played twelve times for the Tunisia national football team and scored twice: first on February 22, 1992, against Nigeria (1–1), and then on October 17, 1993, against Iceland in a 3–1 victory.
