= 1971–72 Tunisian National Championship =

Tunisian National Championship
- Season: 1971–72
- Champions: Étoile Sportive du Sahel
- Relegated: Club Sportif Cheminots; Stade Sportif Sfaxien
- Matches: 182
- Goals: 333 (1.83 per match)
- Top goalscorer: Moncef Khouini (Club Africain) (12 goals)

The 1971–72 Tunisian National Championship was the seventeenth season of the Tunisian national football championship following the country's independence in 1956. The competition was won by Étoile Sportive du Sahel, who finished 3 points ahead of Club Africain in the final standings. It was Étoile du Sahel's fourth league title since independence. The defending champions, Club Sportif Sfaxien, finished sixth.

The league was contested by 14 clubs, each playing 26 matches. RSSSF notes the re-establishment of Espérance Sportive de Tunis, who rejoined the league after being dissolved the previous season. Club Sportif Cheminots and Stade Sportif Sfaxien were relegated at the end of the campaign, while JS Kairouan and CS Hammam-Lif were promoted for the following season.

== League table ==
Pos	Team	Pld	W	D	L	GF	GA	GD	Pts
1	Étoile du Sahel (C)	26	15	9	2	37	14	+23	65
2	Club Africain	26	13	10	3	36	15	+21	62
3	Club Olympique des Transports	26	12	9	5	30	19	+11	59
4	CA Bizertin	26	12	9	5	28	23	+5	59
5	Sfax Railways Sports	26	8	12	6	21	22	−1	54
6	Club Sportif Sfaxien	26	6	13	7	31	26	+5	51
7	Stade Tunisien	26	7	10	9	20	18	+2	50
8	Avenir Sportif de La Marsa	26	6	12	8	19	23	−4	50
9	Espérance de Tunis	26	7	9	10	24	20	+4	49
10	El Makarem de Mahdia	26	6	11	9	19	20	−1	49
11	Union Sportive Maghrébine	26	8	7	11	26	34	−8	49
12	Union Sportive Monastir	26	6	11	9	15	20	−5	49
13	Club Sportif Cheminots (R)	26	4	14	8	11	19	−8	48
14	Stade Sportif Sfaxien (R)	26	2	4	20	16	60	−44	34

Source: RSSSF
Rules for classification: 1) points (3 for a win, 2 for a draw, 1 for a defeat).
(C) = Champions; (R) = Relegated.

== Top scorers ==
Moncef Khouini of Club Africain was the league's top scorer with 12 goals.

== See also ==
- 1970–71 Tunisian National Championship
- 1972–73 Tunisian National Championship
- Tunisian Ligue Professionnelle 1
- Tunisian Cup
