= 1958–59 Tunisian National Championship =

Tunisian National Championship
- Season: 1958–59
- Champions: Espérance Sportive de Tunis
- Relegated: Stade Gabésien; Olympique du Kef
- Matches: 182
- Goals: 508 (2.79 per match)
- Top goalscorer: Abdelmajid Tlemçani (Espérance de Tunis) (32 goals)

The 1958–59 Tunisian National Championship was the fourth season of the Tunisian national football championship following the country's independence in 1956. The competition was won by Espérance Sportive de Tunis, who finished ahead of the defending champions Étoile Sportive du Sahel in the final standings. It was Espérance's second league title overall and their first since independence.

The league was contested by 14 clubs, each playing 26 matches. Stade Gabésien and Olympique du Kef, both promoted the previous season, were relegated at the end of the campaign, while Avenir Musulman was promoted for the following season.

== League table ==
Pos	Team	Pld	W	D	L	GF	GA	GD	Pts
1	Espérance de Tunis (C)	26	18	4	4	63	25	+38	66
2	Étoile du Sahel	26	15	8	3	43	25	+18	64
3	U. Sp. Tunisienne	26	14	7	5	59	32	+27	61
4	Stade Tunisien	26	14	6	6	44	23	+21	60
5	Club Africain	26	11	7	8	42	34	+8	55
6	CS Hammam-Lif	26	9	10	7	28	30	−2	54
7	Sfax Railways Sports	26	8	10	8	33	32	+1	52
8	J. Sp. Methouienne	26	8	9	9	41	44	−3	51
9	Stade Soussien	26	7	6	13	32	41	−9	46
10	CA Bizertin	26	6	8	12	24	39	−15	46
11	Stade Populaire	26	7	5	14	32	49	−17	45
12	Club Tunisien	26	4	10	12	24	42	−18	44
13	Stade Gabésien (R)	26	6	6	14	19	38	−19	44
14	Olympique du Kef (R)	26	4	6	16	24	54	−30	40

Source: RSSSF
Rules for classification: 1) points (3 for a win, 2 for a draw, 1 for a defeat); 2) goal difference.
(C) = Champions; (R) = Relegated.

== Top scorers ==
Abdelmajid Tlemçani of Espérance Sportive de Tunis was the league's top scorer with 32 goals.

== See also ==
- 1957–58 Tunisian National Championship
- 1959–60 Tunisian National Championship
- Tunisian Ligue Professionnelle 1
- Tunisian Cup
