= Khaled Ben Yahia =

Tunisian footballer

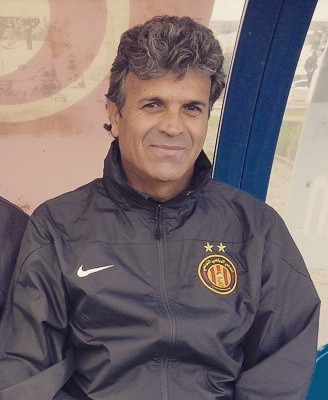
- Ben Yahia in 2015

Personal information
- Date of birth: 12 November 1959 (age 66)
- Position: Defender

Team information
- Current team: MC Alger (head coach)

Senior career*
Years	Team	Apps	(Gls)
1979–1994	Espérance de Tunis		

International career
1979–1993	Tunisia	95	(5)

Managerial career
- 1995–1996: ES Zarzis
- 1996–1997: Espérance de Tunis
- 1999–2000: CS Sfaxien
- 2005: Al-Tai
- 2005–2006: Espérance de Tunis
- 2007: EGS Gafsa
- 2008: CS Sfaxien
- 2011–2012: EGS Gafsa
- 2013–Feb 2014: EGS Gafsa
- Jul–Aug 2014: EGS Gafsa
- 2014–2015: Espérance de Tunis
- Mar–Jul 2015: EGS Gafsa
- Oct–Nov 2014: EGS Gafsa
- 2018: Stade Gabèsien
- 2018: Espérance de Tunis
- 2019: US Tataouine
- 2021: Olympique Béja
- 2021–2022: MC Alger
- 2022-2023: CA Bizertin
- 2023: AS Marsa
- 2024-2025: MC Alger
- 2025-2026: Al-Ittihad SC
- 2026-: MC Alger
- * Club domestic league appearances and goals

Khaled Ben Yahia (Arabic: خَالِد بْن يَحْيَى; born 12 November 1959) is a Tunisian football manager and former player. (Note: Khaled Ben Yahia at National-Football-Teams.com) (Note: Khaled Ben Yahia at WorldFootball.net) A defender, he played 95 games for the Tunisia national team across 15 years. He also competed in the men's tournament at the 1988 Summer Olympics.

== Honours ==
=== As manager ===
Espérance de Tunis

- Tunisian Ligue Professionnelle 1: 2006, 2018
- Tunisian Cup: 1997, 2006

MC Alger

- Algerian Super Cup: 2024
- Algerian ligue Professionnelle 1: 2025
