= 1955–56 Tunisian National Championship =

Tunisian National Championship
- Season: 1955–56
- Champions: CS Hammam-Lif
- Relegated: Patriote de Sousse
- Matches: 132
- Goals: 432 (3.27 per match)
- Top goalscorer: Habib Mougou (25 goals)
- Biggest home win: ESS 8–1 OT
- Biggest away win: OT 1–10 ST
- Highest scoring: OT 1–10 ST

The 1955–56 Tunisian National Championship was the 1st season of top-tier football in Tunisia. It saw CS Hammam-Lif crowned as champions while Patriote de Sousse was relegated to Ligue 2.

== Participating Clubs ==
- CS Hammam-Lif (CSHL)
- Étoile du Sahel (ESS)
- Club Africain (CA)
- Espérance de Tunis (EST)
- CA Bizertin (CAB)
- USM Ferryville (USMF)
- Stade Tunisien (ST)
- Club Tunisien (CT)
- Sfax Railways Sports (SRS)
- Olympique Tunisien (OT)
- Patriote Football Club de Bizerte (PFCB)
- Patriote de Sousse (PS)

== Results ==
=== League table ===
Pos	Team	Pld	W	D	L	GF	GA	GD	Pts	Qualification or relegation
1	CS Hammam-Lif (C)	22	15	6	1	56	15	+41	58	Champion
2	Étoile du Sahel	22	15	3	4	54	28	+26	55	
3	Club Africain	22	12	4	6	43	21	+22	50	
4	Espérance de Tunis	22	11	6	5	38	21	+17	50	
5	Club Athlétique Bizertin	22	11	4	7	36	22	+14	48	
6	Union Sportive Maritime de Ferryville	22	10	2	10	47	41	+6	44	
7	Stade Tunisien	22	8	5	9	41	27	+14	43	
8	Club Tunisien	22	5	8	9	25	35	−10	40	
9	Sfax Railways Sports	22	7	3	12	12	34	−22	39	
10	Olympique Tunis	22	5	5	12	35	72	−37	37	
11	Patrie FC de Bizerte	22	6	2	14	26	52	−26	36	
12	Patriote de Sousse (R)	22	2	2	18	19	77	−58	28	Relegation to Tunisian Ligue 2

Source: rsssf.com
Rules for classification: 3 points for win, 2 points for draw, 1 point for loss
(C) Champions; (R) Relegated

=== Result table ===
Home \ Away	CSHL	ESS	CA	EST	CAB	USMF	ST	CT	SRS	OT	PFCB	PS
CS Hammam-Lif		5–1	3–3	2–0	2–1	3–0	1–0	4–0	1–0	3–2	3–1	7–1
Étoile du Sahel	0–0		2–1	2–1	1–1	1–0	1–0	1–0	5–2	8–1	3–2	4–1
Club Africain	0–0	0–1		2–1	3–0	0–1	1–0	1–0	2–1	4–0	3–0	6–1
Espérance de Tunis	1–0	1–0	2–1		1–0	2–0	1–1	4–1	5–1	1–1	3–0	2–1
Club Athlétique Bizertin	0–0	2–2	1–0	0–0		2–0	3–1	6–2	4–0	1–0	2–1	4–1
Union Sportive Maritime de Ferryville	0–0	5–3	3–1	2–2	1–0		2–0	4–3	2–3	6–1	5–1	4–3
Stade Tunisien	1–0	3–0	0–1	2–1	1–0	5–1		1–1	0–0	5–1	2–0	2–1
Club Tunisien	2–2	3–1	0–2	1–0	1–0	2–0	0–0		1–1	1–0	0–0	6–0
Sfax Railways Sports	1–3	2–1	1–2	2–1	2–1	3–2	3–1	3–0		3–3	2–1	4–1
Olympique Tunis	2–6	1–5	1–1	2–2	1–0	5–4	1–10	2–2	3–2		2–0	6–1
Patrie FC de Bizerte	1–5	2–3	1–1	0–0	0–2	1–1	3–7	2–0	2–1	5–0		3–0
Patriote de Sousse	1–5	1–5	1–7	1–4	1–2	0–5	0–0	1–1	2–1	1–0	4–1	

Source: https://www.kawarji.com/confrontations/ligue1 (kawarji site)
Legend: Blue = home team win; Yellow = draw; Red = away team win.

== Top scorers ==
- 25 goals :
  - Habib Mougou (Étoile du Sahel)
- 13 goals :
  - Boubaker Haddad (CA Bizertin)
  - Mounir Kbaili (Club Africain)
- 11 goals :
  - Hédi Braiek (Stade Tunisien)
  - Norbert Michel (USM de Ferryville)
- 10 goals :
  - Tijani Essafi (Club Tunisien)
  - Amédée Scorsone (Olympique Tunisien)
  - Chedly Bouzid (CA Bizertin)
  - Noureddine Diwa (Stade Tunisien)

== Champion ==
- Club Sportif de Hammam-Lif (CSHL)
  - Formation : Abdesselem, Zouari, Hammouda, Mustapha, Chiarenza, Laaribi, Trabelsi, Azzouz, Saad Karmous, Abdelkader, M. Hénia, Abdelhafidh, Laafif, Ben Jeddou, Ben Smail
  - Coach : Bill Berry

== Movements ==
- Relegated : Patriote de Sousse
- Promoted : Jeunesse Sportive Methouienne
