= 1970–71 Tunisian National Championship =

Tunisian National Championship
- Season: 1970–71
- Champions: Club Sportif Sfaxien
- Relegated: Union Sportive Tunisienne; Football Club Djerissa
- Matches: 156
- Goals: 325 (2.08 per match)
- Top goalscorer: Abdesselam Adhouma (Étoile du Sahel) (24 goals)

The 1970–71 Tunisian National Championship was the sixteenth season of the Tunisian national football championship following the country's independence in 1956. The competition was won by Club Sportif Sfaxien, who finished 5 points ahead of Club Africain in the final standings. It was Club Sportif Sfaxien's second league title since independence. The defending champions, Espérance Sportive de Tunis, were dissolved and do not appear in the final table.

The league was contested by 13 clubs, each playing 24 matches. Union Sportive Tunisienne and Football Club Djerissa were relegated at the end of the campaign, while Union Sportive Maghrébine and Stade Sportif Sfaxien were promoted for the following season. Étoile du Sahel had one point deducted for a forfeit against Union Sportive Monastir.

== League table ==
Pos	Team	Pld	W	D	L	GF	GA	GD	Pts
1	Club Sportif Sfaxien (C)	24	14	8	2	36	14	+22	60
2	Club Africain	24	11	9	4	32	8	+24	55
3	Club Olympique des Transports	24	10	10	4	31	17	+14	54
4	Étoile du Sahel	24	13	3	8	40	24	+16	52
5	Sfax Railways Sports	24	8	10	6	20	18	+2	50
6	El Makarem de Mahdia	24	8	10	6	15	17	−2	50
7	CA Bizertin	24	8	9	7	24	24	0	49
8	Club Sportif Cheminots	24	7	8	9	27	30	−3	46
9	Union Sportive Monastir	24	9	4	11	24	27	−3	46
10	Stade Tunisien	24	6	9	9	23	31	−8	45
11	Avenir Sportif de La Marsa	24	3	13	8	22	29	−7	43
12	U. Sp. Tunisienne (R)	24	2	10	12	18	38	−20	38
13	Football Club Djerissa (R)	24	3	5	16	13	48	−35	35

Source: RSSSF
Rules for classification: 1) points (3 for a win, 2 for a draw, 1 for a defeat).
(C) = Champions; (R) = Relegated.
Note: Étoile du Sahel had one point deducted for a forfeit against Union Sportive Monastir.
Note: Espérance Sportive de Tunis was dissolved and is not included in the table.

== Top scorers ==
Abdesselam Adhouma of Étoile du Sahel was the league's top scorer with 24 goals.

== See also ==
- 1969–70 Tunisian National Championship
- 1971–72 Tunisian National Championship
- Tunisian Ligue Professionnelle 1
- Tunisian Cup
