= 1976–77 Tunisian National Championship =

Tunisian National Championship
- Season: 1976–77
- Champions: JS Kairouan
- Relegated: Olympique du Kef; Association Sportive Mégrine
- Matches: 182
- Goals: 456 (2.51 per match)
- Top goalscorer: Moncef Ouada (JS Kairouan) (16 goals)

The 1976–77 Tunisian National Championship was the twenty-second season of the Tunisian national football championship following the country's independence in 1956. The competition was won by JS Kairouan, who finished 2 points ahead of Club Africain in the final standings. It was JS Kairouan's first league title. The defending champions, Espérance Sportive de Tunis, finished seventh.

The league was contested by 14 clubs, each playing 26 matches. Olympique du Kef and Association Sportive Mégrine were relegated at the end of the campaign, while Stade Africain de Menzel Bourguiba and Stade Sportif Sfaxien were promoted for the following season.

== League table ==
Pos	Team	Pld	W	D	L	GF	GA	GD	Pts
1	JS Kairouan (C)	26	14	7	5	40	27	+13	61
2	Club Africain	26	13	7	6	41	20	+21	59
3	Club Sportif Sfaxien	26	12	8	6	42	33	+9	58
4	Stade Tunisien	26	10	10	6	36	29	+7	56
5	Étoile du Sahel	26	11	8	7	38	32	+6	56
6	Sfax Railways Sports	26	9	11	6	35	30	+5	55
7	Espérance de Tunis	26	9	10	7	46	34	+12	54
8	Avenir Sportif de La Marsa	26	10	6	10	41	39	+2	52
9	CS Hammam-Lif	26	7	12	7	30	33	−3	52
10	CA Bizertin	26	8	8	10	23	23	0	50
11	Club Olympique des Transports	26	6	9	11	27	29	−2	47
12	Union Sportive Monastir	26	3	14	9	18	31	−13	46
13	Olympique du Kef (R)	26	5	8	13	20	40	−20	44
14	Association Sportive Mégrine (R)	26	3	6	17	19	56	−37	38

Source: RSSSF
Rules for classification: 1) points (3 for a win, 2 for a draw, 1 for a defeat).
(C) = Champions; (R) = Relegated.

== Top scorers ==
Moncef Ouada of JS Kairouan was the league's top scorer with 16 goals.

== See also ==
- 1975–76 Tunisian National Championship
- 1977–78 Tunisian National Championship
- Tunisian Ligue Professionnelle 1
- Tunisian Cup
