= 1969–70 Tunisian National Championship =

Tunisian National Championship
- Season: 1969–70
- Champions: Espérance Sportive de Tunis
- Relegated: CS Hammam-Lif; Association Sportive Ariana
- Matches: 182
- Goals: 381 (2.09 per match)
- Top goalscorer: Othman Jenayah (Étoile du Sahel) (17 goals)

The 1969–70 Tunisian National Championship was the fifteenth season of the Tunisian national football championship following the country's independence in 1956. The competition was won by Espérance Sportive de Tunis, who finished 2 points ahead of Club Africain in the final standings. It was Espérance's third league title since independence. The defending champions, Club Sportif Sfaxien, finished fourth.

The league was contested by 14 clubs, each playing 26 matches. CS Hammam-Lif and Association Sportive Ariana were relegated at the end of the campaign, while El Makarem de Mahdia and Football Club Djerissa were promoted for the following season.

== League table ==
| Pos | Team | Pld | W | D | L | GF | GA | GD | Pts |
|---|---|---|---|---|---|---|---|---|---|
| 1 | Espérance de Tunis (C) | 26 | 14 | 9 | 3 | 31 | 13 | +18 | 63 |
| 2 | Club Africain | 26 | 13 | 9 | 4 | 34 | 14 | +20 | 61 |
| 3 | Étoile du Sahel | 26 | 10 | 13 | 3 | 35 | 24 | +11 | 59 |
| 4 | Club Sportif Sfaxien | 26 | 10 | 10 | 6 | 26 | 23 | +3 | 56 |
| 5 | Stade Tunisien | 26 | 11 | 8 | 7 | 28 | 19 | +9 | 56 |
| 6 | Sfax Railways Sports | 26 | 10 | 6 | 10 | 33 | 33 | 0 | 52 |
| 7 | Avenir Sportif de La Marsa | 26 | 8 | 9 | 9 | 27 | 23 | +4 | 51 |
| 8 | Club Olympique des Transports | 26 | 8 | 9 | 9 | 27 | 28 | −1 | 51 |
| 9 | CA Bizertin | 26 | 9 | 6 | 11 | 24 | 31 | −7 | 50 |
| 10 | Club Sportif Cheminots | 26 | 7 | 8 | 11 | 29 | 35 | −6 | 48 |
| 11 | U. Sp. Tunisienne | 26 | 6 | 10 | 10 | 21 | 32 | −11 | 48 |
| 12 | Union Sportive Monastir | 26 | 4 | 13 | 9 | 20 | 29 | −9 | 47 |
| 13 | CS Hammam-Lif (R) | 26 | 4 | 10 | 12 | 20 | 33 | −13 | 44 |
| 14 | Association Sportive Ariana (R) | 26 | 5 | 6 | 15 | 26 | 44 | −18 | 42 |

Source: RSSSF
Rules for classification: 1) points (3 for a win, 2 for a draw, 1 for a defeat).
(C) = Champions; (R) = Relegated.

== Top scorers ==
Othman Jenayah of Étoile du Sahel was the league's top scorer with 17 goals.

== See also ==
- 1968–69 Tunisian National Championship
- 1970–71 Tunisian National Championship
- Tunisian Ligue Professionnelle 1
- Tunisian Cup
