= 1956–57 Tunisian National Championship =

Tunisian National Championship
- Season: 1956–57
- Champions: Stade Tunisien
- Relegated: No relegations
- Matches: 132
- Goals: 453 (3.43 per match)
- Top goalscorer: Miled Ben Messaoud "Farzit" (20 goals)
- Biggest home win: EST 7–1 OT
- Biggest away win: Patriote Football Club de Bizerte 0–6 Stade Tunisien
- Highest scoring: Patriote Football Club de Bizerte 0–6 Stade Tunisien

The 1956–57 Tunisian National Championship was the 2nd season of football in Tunisia, and the first to start after the country's independence in March 1956.

== Participating clubs ==
- Stade Tunisien (ST)
- Espérance de Tunis (EST)
- Étoile du Sahel (ESS)
- Club Africain (CA)
- Jeunesse Sportive Methouienne (JSM)
- Club Sportif de Hammam-Lif (CSHL)
- Union Sportive de Ferryville (USF)
- Club Athlétique Bizertin (CAB)
- Olympique Tunisien (OT)
- Club Tunisien (CT)
- Patriote Football Club de Bizerte (PFCB)
- Sfax Railways Sports (SRS)

== Results ==
=== League table ===
Pos	Team	Pld	W	D	L	GF	GA	GD	Pts	Qualification
1	Stade Tunisien (C)	22	16	4	2	54	24	+30	58	Champion
2	Espérance de Tunis	22	13	7	2	49	18	+31	55	
3	Étoile du Sahel	22	14	1	7	44	27	+17	51	
4	Club Africain	22	9	7	6	39	31	+8	47	
5	Jeunesse Sportive Methouienne	22	8	9	5	49	42	+7	47	
6	Club Sportif de Hammam-Lif	22	8	5	9	41	38	+3	43	
7	Union Sportive de Ferryville	22	7	7	8	30	42	−12	43	
8	CA Bizertin	22	7	5	10	33	35	−2	41	
9	Olympique Tunisien	22	7	5	10	37	54	−17	41	
10	Club Tunisien	22	5	7	10	29	36	−7	39	
11	Patriote Football Club de Bizerte	22	4	7	11	28	49	−21	37	
12	Sfax Railways Sports	22	1	2	19	20	57	−37	26	

Rules for classification: 3 points for win, 2 points for draw, 1 point for loss
(C) Champions

=== Result table ===
Home \ Away	ST	EST	ESS	CA	JSM	CSHL	USF	CAB	OT	CT	PFCB	SRS
Stade Tunisien		3–3	2–1	2–0	3–0	3–0	5–1	3–0	2–1	2–1	3–2	2–0
Espérance de Tunis	3–0		3–1	3–0	2–0	3–1	4–0	1–0	7–1	1–1	2–2	1–0
Étoile du Sahel	0–2	1–0		2–1	4–0	3–2	3–2	2–1	5–0	3–2	2–1	3–1
Club Africain	0–2	1–1	1–0		2–2	0–1	1–1	3–1	1–1	1–0	3–2	2–1
Jeunesse Sportive Methouienne	1–3	0–2	1–0	2–2		2–0	3–1	6–2	4–0	1–0	2–1	4–1
Club Sportif de Hammam-Lif	0–2	1–3	2–3	4–2	1–0		2–0	4–3	2–3	1–0	5–1	5–0
Union Sportive de Ferryville	2–2	0–1	0–1	3–3	1–0	5–1		1–1	0–0	5–1	2–0	2–1
CA Bizertin	4–1	0–0	1–1	1–0	1–0	2–0	0–0		1–1	1–0	0–0	6–0
Olympique Tunisien	1–2	3–6	2–1	0–4	4–4	1–5	0–2	5–1		3–2	2–2	4–0
Club Tunisien	0–1	1–1	2–1	1–1	1–0	3–0	3–3	2–2	3–2		2–0	6–1
Patriote Football Club de Bizerte	0–6	1–0	1–4	2–3	0–2	1–1	3–7	2–0	2–1	5–0		3–0
Sfax Railways Sports	2–2	1–1	1–3	1–2	1–3	1–3	0–2	3–2	3–4	0–1	0–1	

Source: https://www.kawarji.com/confrontations/ligue1 (kawarji site)
Legend: Blue = home team win; Yellow = draw; Red = away team win.

== Movements ==
- Releguated :
  - None
- Promoted :
  - Stade Populaire (SP)
  - Stade Soussien (SS)
  - Union Sportive Tunisienne (UST)

== Top scorers ==
- 20 goals :
  - Farzit (Jeunesse Sportive Methouienne)
- 19 goals :
  - Noureddine Diwa (Stade Tunisien)
  - Saad Karmous (Club Sportif de Hammam-Lif)
- 17 goals :
  - Habib Mougou (Étoile du Sahel)
- 14 goals :
  - Abdelkader Ben Ezzeddine (Espérance de Tunis)
- 13 goals :
  - Kemais Gériani (Jeunesse Sportive Methouienne)
- 11 goals :
  - Hédi Feddou (Espérance de Tunis)
  - Hédi Hammoudia (Club Africain)
  - Laaroussi (Olympique Tunisien)

== Champion ==
- Stade Tunisien (ST)
  - Line-up : Russo, Khaldi, Mahmoud, Chérif, Lakhal, Braiek, Abdelbaki, Noureddine Diwa, Barbéche, Miloud, Shabani, Naija, Laaroussi, Nahali, Rachid
  - Coach : R. Turki
