= 1990–91 Tunisian National Championship =

Tunisian National Championship
- Season: 1990–91
- Champions: Espérance de Tunis
- Relegated: Sfax Railways Sports; AS Oued Ellil
- Cup of Champions: Espérance de Tunis; Club Africain
- Cup Winners' Cup: Étoile du Sahel
- CAF Cup: CA Bizertin
- Matches: 182
- Goals: 413 (2.27 per match)
- Top goalscorer: Fethi Chehaibi "Bargou" (15 goals)
- Biggest home win: CA 4–0 USM; EST 4–0 OB
- Biggest away win: CSS 0–4 CAB
- Highest scoring: ASM 4–2 JSK; CAB 4–2 ESS; COT 4–2 ASM; USM 4–2 COT; CA 3–3 CSS; ST 3–3 AS Ouued Ellil

The 1990–91 Tunisian National Championship season was the 36th season of top-tier football in Tunisia.

== Results ==
=== League table ===
| Pos | Team | Pld | W | D | L | GF | GA | GD | Pts | Qualification or relegation |
|---|---|---|---|---|---|---|---|---|---|---|
| 1 | Espérance de Tunis | 26 | 16 | 8 | 2 | 31 | 13 | +18 | 82 | Qualification to the 1992 African Cup of Champions Clubs |
| 2 | Club Africain | 26 | 13 | 10 | 3 | 43 | 19 | +24 | 75 (Note: Club Africain qualified to 1992 African Cup of Champions Clubs as title holders after winning the 1991 African Cup of Champions Clubs.) | Qualification to the 1992 African Cup of Champions Clubs |
| 3 | Étoile du Sahel | 26 | 10 | 9 | 7 | 35 | 31 | +4 | 65 | Qualification to the 1992 African Cup Winners' Cup |
| 4 | CA Bizertin | 26 | 9 | 11 | 6 | 35 | 28 | +7 | 64 | Qualification to the 1992 CAF Cup |
| 5 | Stade Tunisien | 26 | 9 | 9 | 8 | 32 | 28 | +4 | 62 | |
| 6 | CO Transports | 26 | 8 | 10 | 8 | 31 | 36 | −5 | 60 | |
| 7 | CS Hammam-Lif | 26 | 9 | 7 | 10 | 23 | 22 | +1 | 60 | |
| 8 | JS Kairouan | 26 | 9 | 6 | 11 | 29 | 32 | −3 | 59 | |
| 9 | US Monastir | 26 | 7 | 9 | 10 | 31 | 37 | −6 | 56 | |
| 10 | Olympique Béja | 26 | 6 | 12 | 8 | 28 | 32 | −4 | 56 | |
| 11 | AS Marsa | 26 | 7 | 9 | 10 | 29 | 38 | −9 | 56 | |
| 12 | CS Sfaxien | 26 | 5 | 13 | 8 | 26 | 32 | −6 | 54 (Note: CS Sfaxien ahead on head-to-head record: CS Sfaxien 1–1 Sfax Railways Sports, Sfax Railways Sports 0–2 CS Sfaxien.) | |
| 13 | Sfax Railways Sports | 26 | 6 | 10 | 10 | 22 | 27 | −5 | 54 | Relegation to the Ligue 2 |
| 14 | AS Oued Ellil | 26 | 2 | 9 | 15 | 18 | 38 | −20 | 41 | Relegation to the Ligue 2 |

Source: Championnat National
Rules for classification: 1) points; 2) goal difference; 3) number of goals scored.

=== Result table ===
| Home \ Away | ASM | AOE | CA | CAB | COT | CSHL | CSS | EST | ESS | JSK | OB | SRS | ST | USM |
|---|---|---|---|---|---|---|---|---|---|---|---|---|---|---|
| AS Marsa | — | 2–1 | 1–0 | 1–1 | 3–2 | 0–0 | 1–2 | 1–2 | 0–0 | 4–2 | 2–2 | 1–0 | 2–1 | 1–1 |
| AS Oued Ellil | 1–2 | — | 0–3 | 1–2 | 0–1 | 1–2 | 1–1 | 0–0 | 0–2 | 0–2 | 1–0 | 1–0 | 1–1 | 1–1 |
| Club Africain | 4–1 | 1–1 | — | 0–0 | 1–2 | 1–0 | 3–3 | 3–0 | 3–1 | 1–0 | 2–0 | 2–0 | 1–0 | 4–0 |
| CA Bizertin | 4–1 | 2–1 | 1–1 | — | 2–1 | 0–1 | 1–1 | 0–1 | 4–2 | 2–0 | 2–2 | 0–0 | 2–1 | 2–1 |
| CO Transports | 4–2 | 0–0 | 1–1 | 1–1 | — | 1–0 | 1–1 | 0–0 | 0–0 | 3–1 | 1–1 | 2–2 | 2–1 | 1–1 |
| CS Hammam-Lif | 1–1 | 0–0 | 1–1 | 1–0 | 0–1 | — | 0–1 | 1–1 | 2–0 | 0–1 | 2–0 | 2–0 | 0–1 | 3–2 |
| CS Sfaxien | 0–0 | 1–1 | 0–2 | 0–4 | 1–2 | 0–1 | — | 2–2 | 0–1 | 2–1 | 1–1 | 1–1 | 1–2 | 1–1 |
| ES Tunis | 1–0 | 1–0 | 0–0 | 2–0 | 2–0 | 2–1 | 0–0 | — | 1–1 | 2–1 | 4–0 | 2–0 | 0–0 | 2–1 |
| Étoile du Sahel | 2–1 | 3–1 | 2–2 | 1–1 | 4–1 | 1–0 | 2–0 | 1–0 | — | 2–1 | 1–1 | 1–1 | 0–1 | 1–0 |
| JS Kairouan | 1–1 | 2–1 | 1–2 | 3–1 | 1–0 | 1–0 | 1–0 | 0–1 | 2–2 | — | 3–2 | 1–1 | 1–0 | 1–1 |
| Olympique Béja | 1–0 | 3–1 | 1–0 | 1–1 | 4–1 | 1–1 | 0–0 | 0–1 | 2–1 | 2–1 | — | 0–0 | 0–0 | 2–3 |
| Sfax Railways Sports | 2–0 | 2–0 | 1–1 | 2–0 | 1–1 | 2–0 | 0–2 | 0–1 | 2–2 | 1–0 | 2–2 | — | 2–0 | 0–1 |
| Stade Tunisien | 2–0 | 3–3 | 1–3 | 0–0 | 2–0 | 1–1 | 2–2 | 1–2 | 3–2 | 1–1 | 0–0 | 3–0 | — | 3–1 |
| US Monastir | 1–1 | 1–0 | 1–1 | 2–2 | 4–2 | 2–3 | 1–3 | 0–1 | 2–0 | 0–0 | 1–0 | 1–0 | 1–2 | — |

Source: Championnat National
Legend: Blue = home team win; Yellow = draw; Red = away team win.
