= Abderraouf Ben Aziza =

Tunisian football forward

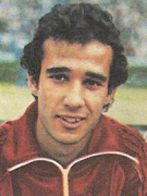
- Aziza in 1978

Personal information
- Date of birth: 23 September 1953 (age 73)
- Place of birth: Grombalia, Tunisia
- Position: Forward

Senior career*
Years	Team	Apps	(Gls)
1972-1979	Étoile Sportive du Sahel	185	(80)
1979–1982	Al-Nassr		
1982-1983	CS Hammam Lif	39	(10)

International career
1973-1978	Tunisia	43	(7)
- * Club domestic league appearances and goals

Abderraouf Ben Aziza (Arabic: عَبْد الرَّؤُوف بْن عَزِيزَة; born 23 September 1953) is a Tunisian football forward who played for the Tunisia national team. He appeared for Tunisia in the 1978 FIFA World Cup. He also played for Étoile Sportive du Sahel. He also played for Al-Nassr for 3 years from 1978 until 1981 and won the Saudi League twice, in 1980 and 1981.
