= AS Kasserine =

Tunisian football club

Avenir de Kasserine
- Full name: Avenir Sportif de Kasserine
- Nickname(s): Frechich
- Founded: 1948
- Ground: Kasserine Municipal Stadium; Kasserine, Tunisia
- Capacity: 8,000
- Chairman: Kamel Hamzaoui
- Manager: Samir Jenhaoui
- League: Ligue 2
Home colours	Away colours

The Avenir Sportif de Kasserine (Arabic: المستقبل الرياضي بالڨصرين), known as AS Kasserine or simply ASK for short, is a Tunisian football club based in Kasserine. The club was founded in 1948 and its colours are green and white. Their home stadium, Kasserine Municipal Stadium, has a capacity of 8,000 spectators. The club currently plays in the Tunisian Ligue Professionnelle 2.

== History ==
The club was founded in 1948. The team has known its golden era in the late 1980s when the team was promoted for the first time to the Ligue 1 at the end of the 1987 season. The team remained in the top level for three consecutive years before being relegated again to the Ligue 2, until 1992 when they were briefly promoted to the Ligue 1 for one season before being relegated again. They came back to Ligue 1 in 2008 and again in 2015.

== Honours ==
- Tunisian League 2: 2

Champions: 1986–87, 1991–92
Runner-up: 2007–08.

== Managers ==
- (Tunisia) Taoufik Ben Othman (1999)
