= OC Kerkennah =

Tunisian football club

- Full name: Océano Club de Kerkennah
- Nickname: El Mouhit / Nadi El Jazira
- Founded: 1963
- Ground: Stade de la Cité El Habib (Sfax)
- League: Ligue 2
- 2015–16: 3rd
- Website: www.ockerkennah.com
Home colours	Away colours	Third colours

Océano Club de Kerkennah (Arabic: نادي محيط قرقنة, often referred to as OCK or mainly Arabic: El-Mouhit) is a Tunisian football team from the archipelago of Kerkennah. The club was founded in 1963. They play in blue and white colors.
