= JS Kairouan =

Tunisian association football club

Jeunesse Sportive Kairouanaise
- Full name: Jeunesse Sportive Kairouanaise
- Nicknames: Chabiba, JSK
- Founded: 10 October 1942; 84 years ago
- Ground: Stade Hamda Laouani
- Capacity: 5,000
- Coordinates: 35.68595379990378, 10.073373963740867
- Chairman: Chokri Rahmani
- Manager: Lotfi Kadri
- League: Tunisian Ligue Professionnelle 2
- 2025–26: 14th
Home colours	Away colours

Jeunesse Sportive Kairouanaise (Arabic: الشبيبة الرياضية القيروانية), known as JS Kairouan, Chabiba or simply JSK, is a Tunisian football club based in Kairouan. Founded in 1942, the club is one of the historic football clubs of central Tunisia and its colours are green and white.

Their home stadium, Stade Hamda Laouani, has a capacity of 5,000 spectators. The stadium is named after Hamda Laouani, a prominent figure in the club's history who served as president and was closely associated with the club's rise to the national elite and its 1977 championship. The stadium has been the principal home of JSK throughout its modern history and has hosted numerous important domestic fixtures.

The club is currently playing in the Tunisian Ligue Professionnelle 2.

== History ==
=== Foundation and early years ===
The origins of organised football in Kairouan predate the foundation of JS Kairouan. The first known sports association in the city was the Stade Kairouanais, founded in 1920 on the initiative of René Solal. The club competed in the Central District and included both Tunisian and French players.

Following the dissolution of Stade Kairouanais in 1941, local sportsmen established the Jeunesse Sportive Kairouanaise the following year. The club was formally founded on 10 October 1942.

The first recorded executive committee was elected at the general assembly of 20 February 1943. Chedly Belhaj became the club's first president, with Zribi Tassi as vice-president and Salah Ben Jannet as general secretary.

During its early decades, JSK competed outside the national elite and made several unsuccessful attempts to reach the top division.

=== Rise to the national elite ===
JS Kairouan finally reached the national first division in 1972. The team subsequently established itself among the leading sides outside the traditional Tunisian football centres.

The club's breakthrough came during the 1976–77 season. Managed by Hamda Laouani and coached by Yugoslav Dragan Vasiljevic, JSK won the Tunisian championship for the first time in its history.

The championship-winning side was built around captain and midfield leader Khemaïs Laabidi and striker Moncef Ouada. Ouada finished the season as the league's leading scorer (18 goals). The title remains JS Kairouan's only Tunisian championship to date.

The championship established JSK as one of the most prominent football clubs from Tunisia's interior regions.

=== The 1990s ===
JSK remained a regular presence in the top division during the following decades. The club came particularly close to adding another major domestic honour during the 1990s.

In the 1992–93 season, JSK finished second in the Tunisian championship, its highest league finish since winning the title in 1977.

The club also reached the 1996 Tunisian Cup final, where it was defeated, making the 1996 final the closest JSK came to winning the national cup.

The 1990–91 season also produced one of the club's notable individual achievements, with Fethi Chehaibi finishing as the league's leading scorer. Chehaibi, known by the nickname "Bargou", subsequently became one of JSK's leading goalscorers in Ligue 1.

=== Relegation and returns to Ligue 1 ===
After a long period in the top division, JSK were relegated to the second tier following 27 seasons in Ligue 1. The club returned to the top flight for the 2005–06 season, but subsequently suffered another relegation.

JSK returned to Ligue 1 again after finishing second in Ligue 2 in the 2008–09 season. The club subsequently spent further periods in the top flight before another decline and eventual relegation.

The following years were characterised by frequent changes in coaching staff and fluctuating performances. The club continued to produce and develop local players while attempting to compete with the increasingly financialised structure of Tunisian football.

=== Decline during the late 2010s and early 2020s ===
During the late 2010s and early 2020s, JSK experienced one of the most difficult periods in its modern history.

The club's decline coincided with reduced financial resources and difficulties maintaining the infrastructure and sporting structures required for sustained top-level competition. The closure or weakening of youth-development structures further affected the club's ability to rely on a continuous generation of locally developed players.

The 2020–21 Ligue 1 campaign became one of the lowest points in the club's history. JSK collected only three points from 26 league matches and suffered relegation.

The club subsequently spent several seasons in Ligue 2 while rebuilding its sporting structure.

The club returned to Ligue 1 for the 2025–26 season after winning Group B of the 2024–25 Ligue 2 season, but was relegated after finishing 14th in its return campaign.

== Honours ==
- Tunisian Ligue Professionnelle 1
  - Winners (1): 1976–77
- Coupe de Tunisie
  - Runners-up (1): 1996

== Presidents ==
- Chedly Belhaj (1942–44)
- Cherif Mtelli (1944–46)
- Abdelkader Fitouri (1946–47)
- Jilani Laaouani (1947–48)
- Abdelkader Fitouri (1948–50)
- Hamda Laaouani (1950–56)
- Zribi Tassi (1957–62)
- Hamda Laaouani (1962–63)
- Naceur Malouche (1963–64)
- Mustapha Ben Ghanem (1964–65)
- Abdeljelil Fourati (1965–67)
- Taoufik Nabli (1967–68)
- Naceur Malouche (1968–70)
- Hamda Laaouani (1970–77)
- Aziz Miled (1977–79)
- Mustapha Barrek (1979–80)
- Aziz Miled (1980–82)
- Rachid Meftah (1982–84)
- Ezzeddine Abdelkefi (1984–85)
- Mohamed Negra (1985–88)
- Hafedh Allani (1988–89)
- Taoufik Miled (1989–90)
- Rachid Meftah (1990–92)
- Abderrazak Yazid (1992–95)
- Mohamed Atallah (1995–96)
- Mohamed Mestiri (1996–97)
- Mohamed Atallah (1997–99)
- Abderrazak Yazid (1999–01)
- Mohamed Atallah (2001–03)
- Hedhili Fayala (2003–06)
- Fateh Alouini (2006–07)
- Mohamed Atallah (2007–09)
- Fateh Alouini (2009–11)
- Mourad Bellakhel (2011–15)
- Hafedh Allani (2015–17)
- Mohamed Memni (2017–20)
- Bechir Lahmer (2020–22)
- Mourad Bellakhel (2022–24)
- Mohamed Kalai (2024–25)
- Bechir Lahmer (2025–)

== Managers ==
- Ahmed Dhib (1985–86)
- Ignaz Good (1 July 2001 – 30 June 2002)
- Mrad Mahjoub (18 June 2009 – 30 May 2010)
- Sofiene Hidoussi (17 August 2010 – 24 November 2010)
- Mourad Okbi (1 December 2010 – 4 November 2013)
- Salem Ghedhami (interim) (5 November 2013 – 13 November 2013)
- Mahmoud Ouertani (13 November 2013 – 26 November 2013)
- Salem Ghedhami (interim) (27 January 2014 – 6 February 2014)
- Luc Eymael (1 July 2014–15)
- Pascal Janin (2015–2016)
- Antônio Dumas (2016)
- Othman Chehaibi (2024–)
