= Sfax RS =

Tunisian association football club

Sfax Railway Sport
- Full name: Sfax Railway Sport
- Nickname: El Ralwee / El Sikak
- Founded: 8 May 1920; 106 years ago
- Ground: Stade Ameur El-Gargouri; Sfax, Tunisia
- Capacity: 4,000
- League: CLP-2
- 2018/19: 7th
Home colours	Away colours

Sfax Railway Sport (Arabic: نادي سكك الحديد الصفاقسي, often referred to as Railway or ٍُSRS) is a Tunisian football club from the city Sfax founded in 1920.

The club have been champions three times and were in the top division for 33 seasons. However, but 1994–95 was their last season in the top flight and today they play in Ligue Professionnelle 2

== Stadium ==
- ¹ Picture of the Stadium of SRS Ameur Gargouri.

== Honours ==
- Tunisian Ligue Professionnelle 1
  - Winners (3): 1933–34, 1952–53, 1967–68
- Tunisian Ligue Professionnelle 2
  - Winners (2): 1993–94, 1962–63 (south group)

=== Youth ===
- U21 Championship
  - Winners (2): 1967, 1989
- U21 Cup
  - Winners (1): 1989
- U18 Championship
  - Winners (1): 1986
- U18 Cup
  - Winners (2): 1985, 1988
