= Espérance Sportive de Tunis =

Association football club in Tunisia

ES Tunis
- Full name: Espérance Sportive de Tunis
- Nicknames: Taraji; The Beast of Africa; The Smiling One; The Red and Yellow; The Blood and Gold; The Elder of Tunisian Clubs
- Short name: EST
- Founded: January 15, 1919; 107 years ago
- Ground: Hammadi Agrebi Stadium
- Capacity: 65,000
- Coordinates: 36.74778°N 10.27278°E
- Chairman: Hamdi Meddeb
- Manager: Pablo Franco
- League: Tunisian Ligue Professionnelle 1
- 2025–26: Ligue 1, 2nd of 16
- Website: est.org.tn
Home colours	Away colours	Third colours

Espérance Sportive de Tunis (EST, French pronunciation: [ɛs.pe.ʁɑ̃s spɔʁ.tiv də ty.nis]) and in Arabic: الترجي الرياضي التونسي, romanized: (Attaraji ar-Riyāḍi Attūnisī), or simply as Attaraji, is a Tunisian professional sports club founded on 15 January 1919 in the Bab Souika neighborhood of Tunis. Its football section has competed in the Tunisian Professional League 1 continuously since 1936. It is nicknamed "Mkashkha", The Elder of Tunisian Clubs, The Blood and Gold Club and The Beast of Africa (Note: The nickname "Beast of Africa" originated after the club's dominant 1994 season, in which it won every major continental trophy available at the time.)

It is the most successful Tunisian club nationally and internationally in all competitions, with 34 Tunisian Professional League 1 titles (record), the last of which was the 2024–25 season, 17 Tunisian Cup titles (record), the last of which was the 2025–26 season, and 8 Tunisian Super Cup titles (record), the most recent of which is the 2025 edition, the Hedi Shaker Cup in 1968 and the Hamda El Aouani tournament in 1978. At the African level, Esperance won the CAF Champions League title four times in 1994, 2011, 2018, 2018–19, the CAF Cup in 1997, the CAF Super Cup in 1995 and the African Cup Winners' Cup in 1998. At the Arab level, Esperance is the most Arab club to have won the Arab Club Champions Cup title three times (a record) in the 1993, 2008–09, 2017 editions, and the Arab Super Cup in 1996. Globally, Esperance won the Afro-Asian Club Championship in 1995. It participated three times in the FIFA Club World Cup in 2011, 2018, and 2019, and was satisfied with fifth place as the best participation. Espérance Sportive de Tunis ranked third in the list of the best African clubs of the twenty-first century compiled by FIFA behind Al Ahly SC and TP Mazembe. The Confederation of African Football also chose it as the fifth best African club in the twentieth century, and it topped the ranking of African clubs several times, most recently in 2018. Espérance Sportive de Tunis won the CAF Champions League in 2011 and received the FIFA Fair Play Award at the FIFA Club World Cup in 2019. There is a certain rivalry with Club Africain, which it plays against in the Tunis derby every season of the Tunisian Professional League 1 and sometimes the Tunisian Cup, and another competition in the Tunisian Clásico with Étoile Sportive du Sahel and CS Sfaxien. Former Esperance player Tarak Dhiab is considered a legend and icon of the club, as he is the most participating player with 427 matches and the all-time top scorer, scoring 127 goals. Tunisian businessman Hamdi Meddeb has been president of the club since 2007, and it has been coached by Spanish coach Pablo Franco since October 2026. Espérance de Tunis will host its competitors on the field of the Hammadi Agrebi Stadium, located in the city of Radès, in the southern suburb of the city Tunis. After his name, several clubs in the region were named after Esperance, such as Espérance Sportive de Zarzis, Esperance Wadi Al-Nis of Palestine, Esperance Club of Saudi Arabia, Espérance Sportive Troyes of France and Esperance Mostaganem of Algeria.

Espérance de Tunis has a wide fan base in Tunisia, not only in the capital but throughout the country. After winning the CAF Champions League title twice in a row, the club's popularity has also appeared in Africa, and fans abroad frame some of its beloved cells such as France, Germany, Qatar and the United Arab Emirates. In the 2018 FIFA Club World Cup, more than 15,000 supporters were transported to the United Arab Emirates to support the team.

== History ==
=== Founding and early years ===
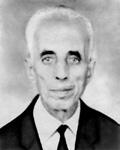
Muhamed Zouaoui, the co-founder of Espérance

The club was founded at the Café de L'Espérance (Arabic: مقهى الترجي) in the Bab Souika neighborhood of Tunis, by Muhamed Zouaoui (of Kabyle heritage) and Hédi Kallel.

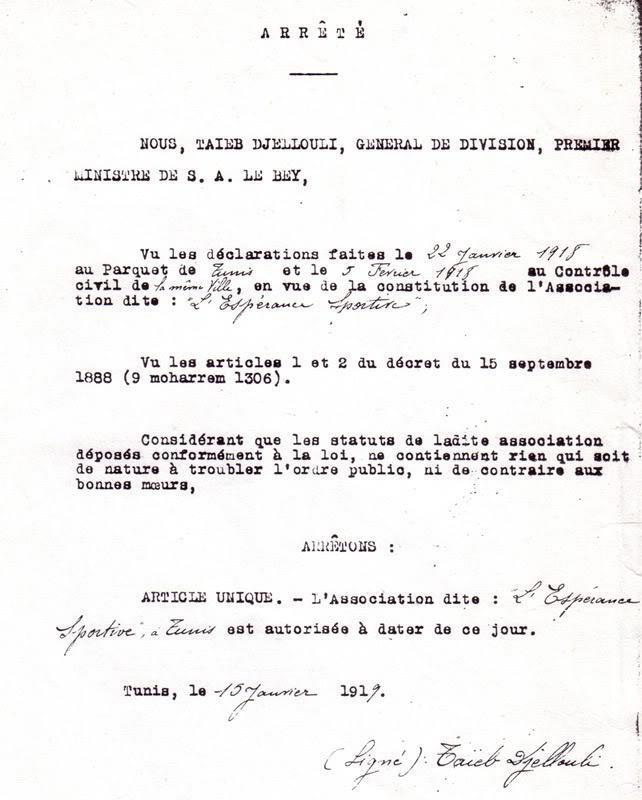
Authorization decree 15 January 1919 .

After almost one year of waiting, the authorities granted the founders of Espérance an initial verbal approval to establish the club in January 1919. However, two weeks later, they were required to appoint a French president to obtain official authorization, as the regulations at the time mandated that all such clubs be legally chaired by a French national. To comply, they turned to Louis Montassier, a member of the French colonial administration.

On 15 January 1919, Espérance was officially registered, marking a moment of great joy for its founders, Muhamed Zouaoui and Hédi Kallel, who successfully established the first Tunisian football club. Its initial colors were green and white ➜.

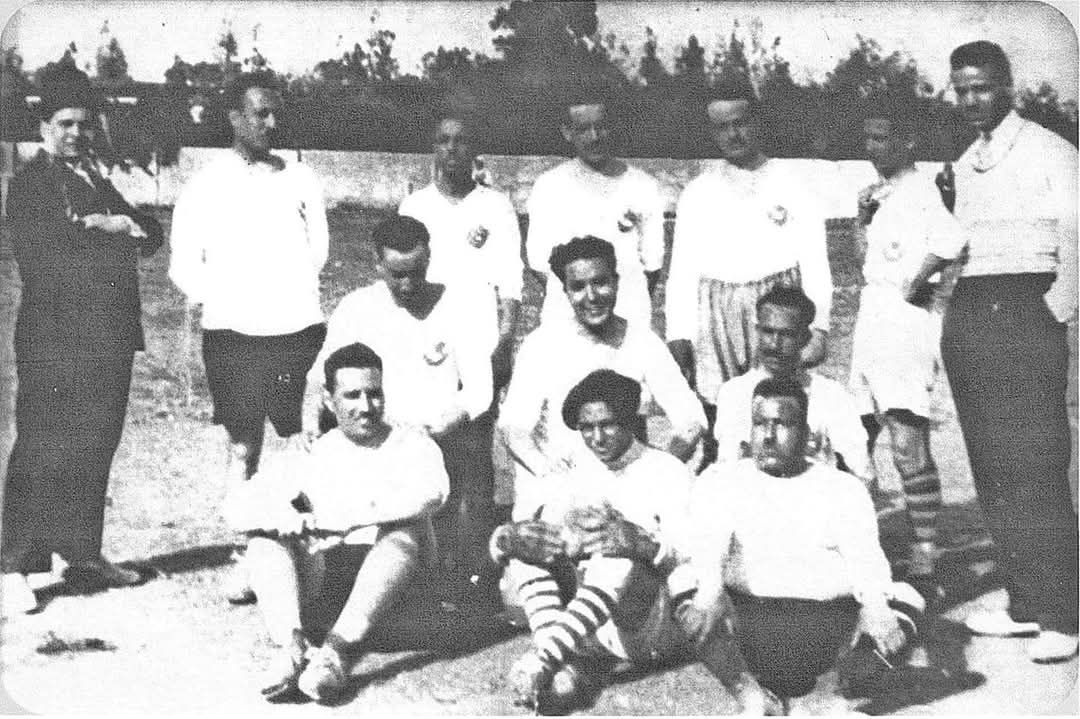
Espérance with the white and green jersey in 1920.

Due to a persistent shortage of green jerseys, Chedly Zouiten stumbled upon a stock of red and yellow jerseys while shopping. They wore these colors for an upcoming match and won. Believing the new colors brought them good luck, the club decided to adopt them permanently. This marked the transition to red and yellow ➜, which became the club's iconic "Sang et Or" colors, a tradition that continues today.

Under Zouiten's tenure, which lasted more than three decades, Espérance was nearly on the verge of abandonment until promotion to the honorary division of the League of Tunisia in 1936. Espérance also managed to reach the final of the Tunisian Cup, but were beaten by Stade Gaulois. Two years after its failure against the Stade Gaulois, Espérance won the Tunisian Cup (1939) against the Etoile Sportive du Sahel (4–1), its first ever triumph and title. It was in 1955 that Espérance qualified to represent the Tunisian League in the North African Cup. In the knockout match, two of the five teams were drawn at random to compete against each other and the winner qualifies for the Quarterfinals. SC Bel Abbès was a French Algerian Club and the Espérance Sportive de Tunis faced each other, the match took place on 20 February 1955, the Tunisian club losing on the score of 2 goals to 1. Between the start of the World War II and independence (1956), the squad quality improved.

=== An exclusively Muslim club ===
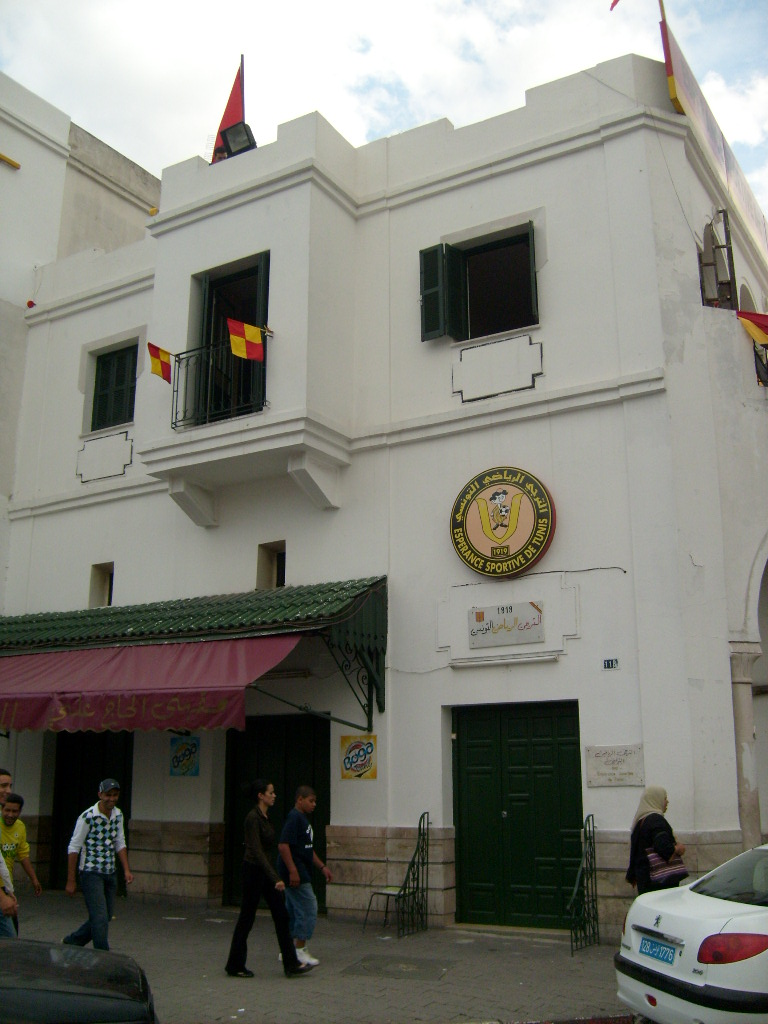
Espérance café in Bab Souika.

Football emerged in the Regency of Tunis in the early 1900s. European clubs, largely colonial appendices of metropolitan sports associations, were the only ones to participate in the first Tunisian championship in 1910. Among these were French clubs such as Racing Club de Tunis (founded in 1904), Les Lutins (a society sponsored and funded by the Catholic Church), Sporting Club de Tunis (1908), and Stade Gaulois, as well as Italian clubs (Italia de Tunis, Savoia de Sousse) and Maltese clubs, with the most representative being Mélita-Sports in Tunis. The following years saw this lineup grow with Jeanne d'Arc, Avant Garde, and Stade Tunisois. The Stade Africain, a Franco-Arab club (but predominantly French), was the first to include Tunisian players, recruited from colleges and high schools.

After a two-year interruption due to the World War I, a Franco-Arab Cup was held in 1917, marking the return to competition. During the final between Stade Africain and Stade Tunisois (a club that only accepted Jewish players), violent incidents erupted between the supporters of the two teams. The atmosphere in the stands was filled with latent anti-Semitism: the 14 points of President Woodrow Wilson and the Balfour Declaration were on the lips of those in the know, and resentment against the Jewish population, who had not been mobilized during the conflict, lingered in the minds of military personnel filling the stands. Following the disturbances between Muslims and Jews, and the anti-Semitic incidents that marred the match, any sports demonstration or mass gathering was banned.

Located in the northern part of the Medina, Rue Achour, predominantly Muslim, extended towards Hafsia, an area with a significant Jewish population, fostering interaction between two neighboring groups. These communities, initially adversaries, grew closer and decided to merge their teams, calming the authorities of the French Protectorate. In response, the Union Sportive Tunisienne (UST) was born from the fusion of Stade Tunisois and Stade Africain. This new club would go on to dominate Tunisian football during the interwar period.

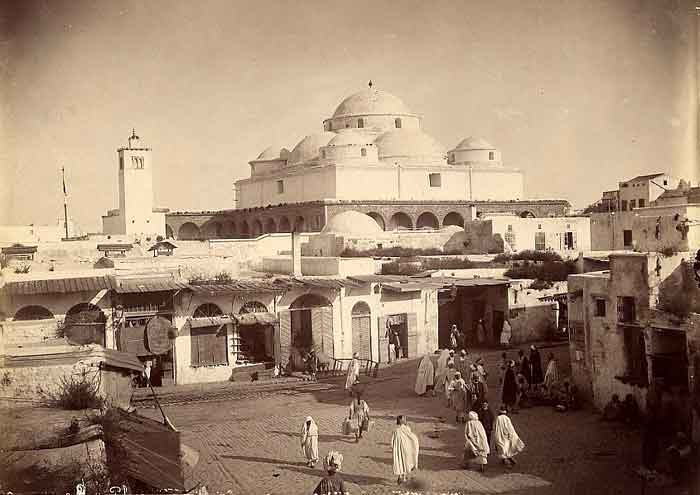
Bab Souika TUNIS in 1919.

Muhamed Zouaoui, the goalkeeper for Stade Africain, alongside Hédi Kallel and Othman Ben Soltan, who were advocates for the creation of an "authentically" Muslim club—not just a Tunisian one—met at the "L'Espérance" café on the edge of the Medina Bab Souika. This meeting marked the founding of Espérance Sportive de Tunis. The establishment of this club was in direct response to the creation of the UST, which had been predominantly composed of Jewish players after the departure of Muslim members. Espérance Sportive was officially granted permission by the French authorities on 15 January 1919, and was formed not to oppose a national identity but as a countermeasure to the Jewish community's initiative in Tunisian football.

The founding date of Espérance carries special significance in shaping the club's identity. Many football enthusiasts, regardless of which team they support, believe that Espérance is the first Tunisian team to have been created in the country. This sense of authenticity derived from the club's origins contributes to its mythical status: it is often seen as an early commitment to the national movement. The club's recruitment policy, focused exclusively on Muslim players from the beginning, further solidified its reputation. Despite modest early results, Espérance stood out by its insistence on fielding only Muslim players, in contrast to other Tunisian clubs like UST and Club Africain, which fielded French or Italian players. This refusal to have "mixed blood" players and the purity of a team composed solely of local talent positioned Espérance as a symbol of Tunisian nationalism.

However, the presence of a French president,Louis Montassier, who was required by French law when forming any association, did somewhat tarnish the club's image among the "Espérantistes," as this affiliation conflicted with the ideals of nationalism. Nevertheless, the authenticity of Espérance Sportive was cemented by its deep-rooted connection to the northern Medina neighborhoods, reinforcing its status as a local, nationalist institution.

=== First achievements (1936–1956) ===
In 1936, under the leadership of coach Hammadi Ben Ghasham, Espérance Sportive de Tunis secured promotion to the first division, a status they have never left since. The players who contributed to this achievement in such tough circumstances included: Mohsen El-Khlifi, Al-Arrousi Ettasouri, El-Kafi, Berlabih, El-Riyahi, Larqash, Ben Ghasham, Khalafed, Baalrabi, Cherif, Ben Ghazi, El-Halaibi, Abdelsamad, El-Madhab, and El-Qatousi.

During the presidency of Chedly Zouiten, who led for over three decades, the club almost risked being overlooked before it was promoted to the prestigious league in 1936. Espérance also reached the final of the Tunisian Cup, but they were defeated by Stade Guelma.

After Two years of setbacks against Stade Guelma, Espérance achieved victory in the 1938–39 Tunisian Cup, triumphing 4–1 over their archrival Étoile Sportive du Sahel. In 1955, the club advanced to represent the Tunisian Football League in the North African Championship. In the knockout phase, two teams were drawn randomly to face off, with the winner progressing to the semi-finals. Wydad Athletic Club from the Moroccan league and Espérance Sportive de Tunis were drawn together, with the match held in Tunis on 15 May 1955. Espérance lost 2–1.

From the beginning of World War II to Tunisian independence, the club's strength was felt all across the country. Espérance emerged as the dominant club, reinforced by Algerian players like Abdelaziz Ben Tifour. At this point, French, Italian, and Maltese clubs, which had previously ruled Tunisian football, had to accept Espérance Sportive de Tunis as the top club in Tunisia.

=== Post independence 1956 ===
The titles (champion in 1958 and 1960 and winner of the cup in 1957) but also the style of play explain the popular enthusiasm. Attacking football was abandoned in 1963 following the passage of Ben Azzedine as coach. The latter opted for Italian-style defensive principles.

In 1971, violent riots occurred in Stade El Menzah by Espérance supporters following the final lost against the Club Sportive Sfaxien (historic goal of Abdelwahed Trabelsi in the first minute of the game). The authorities then sanctioned Espérance and withdrew the right to play in the first division.

=== Slim Chiboub era and national dominance (1989–2004) ===
Slim Chiboub took charge of the club in 1989. Quickly, he kept one of his promises with a double in 1990–1991. In 1993, he won international and local titles. Espérance also won its first regional cup, the Arab Club Champions Cup, becoming the first Tunisian team to do so in 1993. The following year, the club won its first CAF Champions League at the expense of defending champion Zamalek. In 1995, EST won the CAF Super Cup as well as the Afro-Asian Cup, becoming the first Tunisian club to win all possible continental titles. Espérance Sportive de Tunis won ten Tunisian league titles, including seven successive titles between 1998 and 2004 and set a new national record.

=== Hamdi Meddeb era and sustained success (2007–present) ===
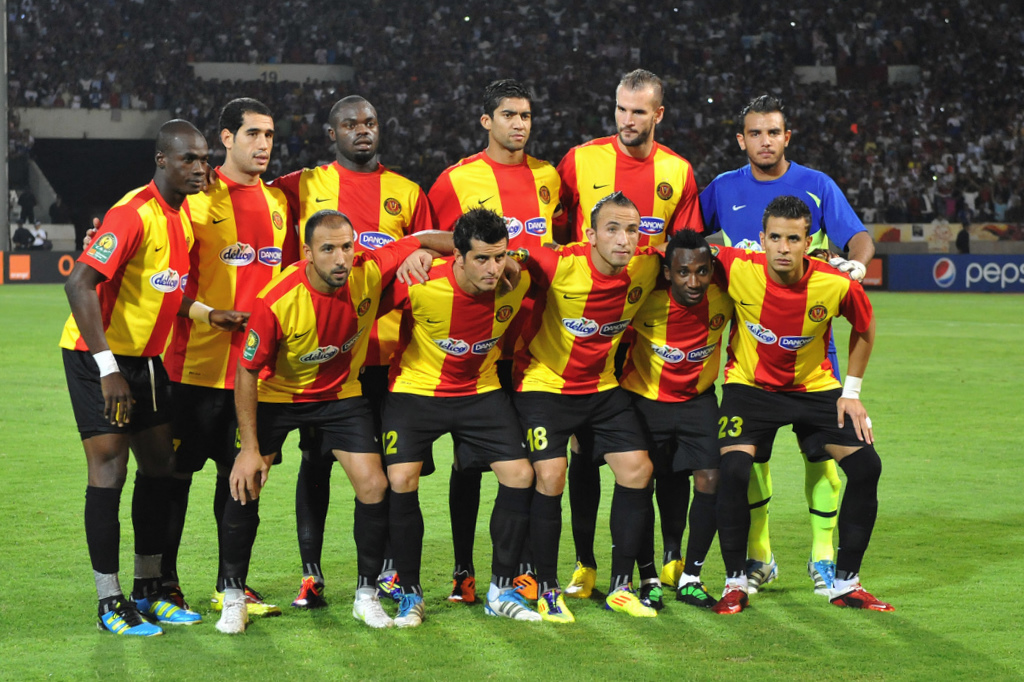
Espérance Sportive de Tunis, CAF Champions League Champions in 2011

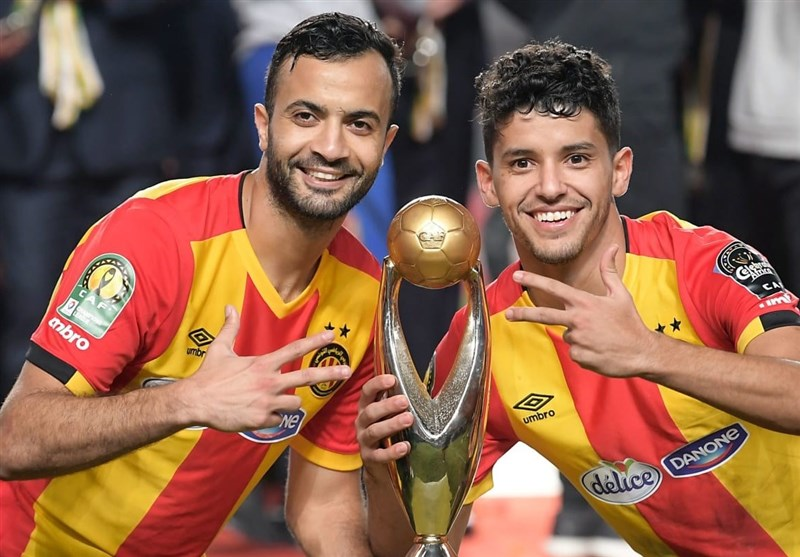
Espérance Sportive de Tunis, CAF Champions League Champions in 2018

Between 2005 and 2007, Aziz Zouhir led the club, which won the double (championship and cup) in 2006. In 2007, Hamdi Meddeb took charge of the club. He focused on boosting Espérance financially and recruiting African and Tunisian talents.

The 2010–2011 season Espérance completed a historical treble by winning the League, National Cup and the African Champions League, under coach Nabil Maâloul. Following this success, a new committee chaired by Hamdi Meddeb was elected on 25 September 2011 for a three-year term. However, Maâloul resigned after a sixth place in the FIFA Club World Cup. However, the team lost the 2012 CAF Champions League final to Al Ahly, and the team star Youssef Msakni was sold to Qatari club Lekhwiya for 23 million Tunisian dinars.

On 6 August 2017, the club won their fourth Arab title and third Arab club championship by beating the Jordanian side Al Faisaly (3–2) after extra time. After winning its 28 league title on 8 April, Espérance won its third CAF Champions League against Al Ahly despite a defeat (3–1) on the home soil of the eight-time African champions in the first leg. In the second match, the Tunisians won with a score of 3–0, in front of a crowd of 60,000 people, with goals from Saad Bguir and Anice Badri. With the help of the young coach Moïne Chaâbani the club clinched the third Champions League in its history, a few months before its centenary on 15 January 2019. The club ended the 2018–2019 season as African champions for the fourth time after winning the CAF Champions League against Wydad (1–1 away and 1–0 at home), due to Wydad refusing to play in protest of VAR decision.

==== Building a new generation (2008–2010) ====
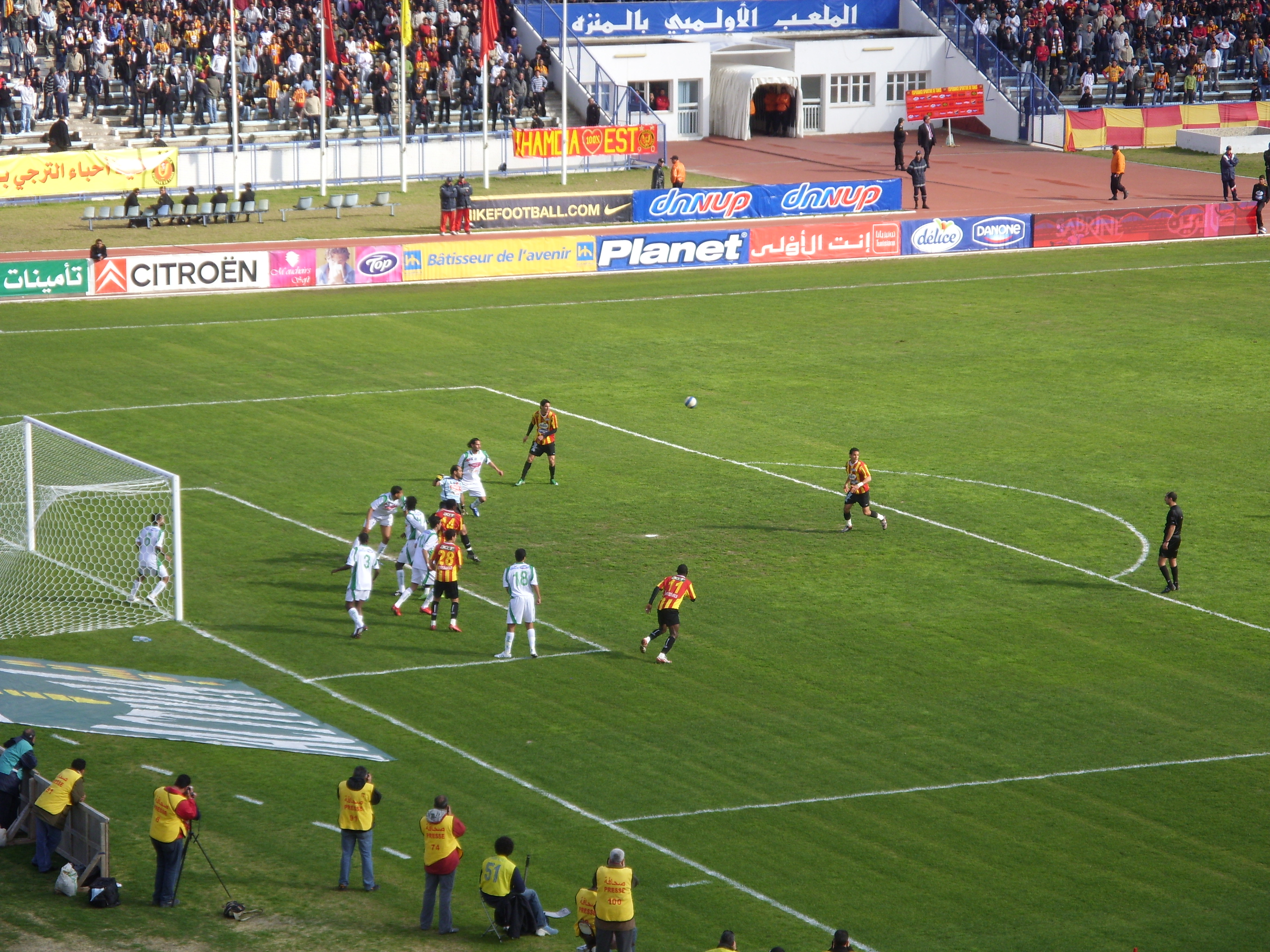
Match between Espérance Sportive de Tunis and Club Sportif de Hammam Lif during the 2008–09 Tunisian Ligue Professionnelle 1 at the El Menzah Stadium.

In this context, the club aims to recruit one African star per year, following the example of Michael Eneramo. Over the years, Espérance signed several African and Tunisian internationals, including Harrison Afful from Feyenoord in the Netherlands and a member of the Ghana national team, Eneramo (from the Nigeria national football team), Khaled Korbi and Youssef Msakni (from Stade Tunisien and both members of the Tunisia national football team), Mejdi Traoui (from Red Bull Salzburg and a member of the Tunisia national team), Dramane Traoré from FC Lokomotiv Moscow and a member of the Mali national football team, and Yannick N'Djeng for 700,000 euros.

With these players, the club won the Tunisian Cup in 2008 and 2011, as well as the championship in the 2008–2009, 2009–2010, 2010–2011, and 2011–2012 seasons, in addition to the 2009 North African Cup Winners Cup and the Arab Champions League 2008-2009. They were also finalists in the CAF Champions League 2010. However, Meddeb's policy was not limited to recruiting football players: he hired coach Faouzi Benzarti and later the club's own Nabil Maâloul in December 2010.

==== Historic treble (2011) ====

2011 CAF Champions League Final winning lineup

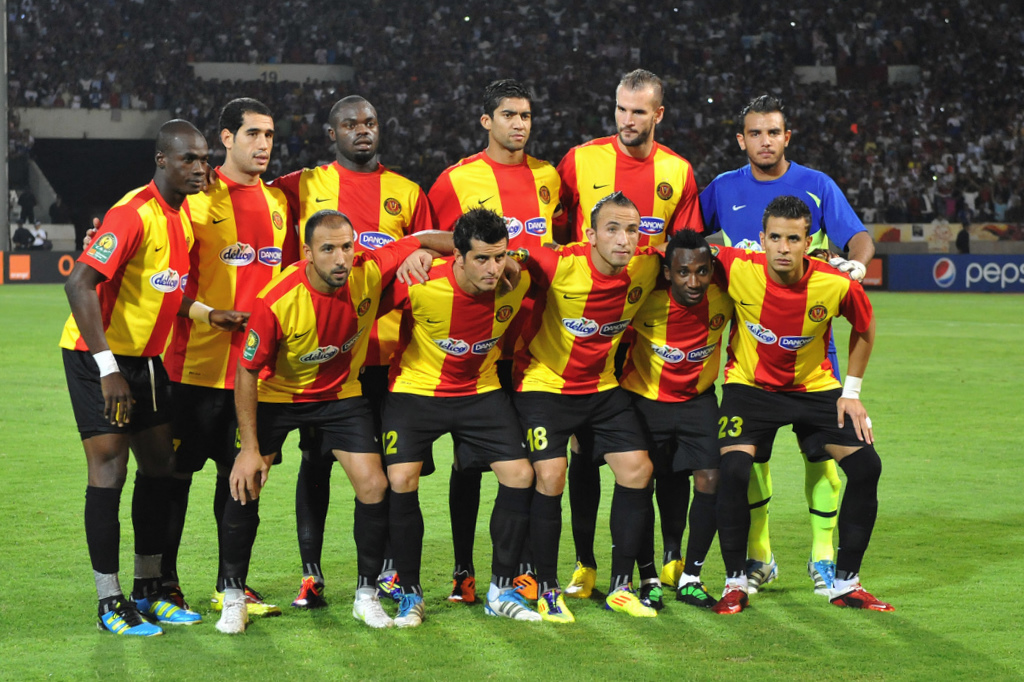
Team lineup against Wydad AC in Casablanca during the 2011 CAF Champions League

The 2010–2011 season marked a pinnacle in the history of Espérance Sportive de Tunis, as they achieved a remarkable treble. The club clinched the 2010–11 Tunisian Ligue Professionnelle 1, the 2010–2011 Tunisian Cup, and most notably, the prestigious 2011 CAF Champions League, a triumph that cemented their dominance in African football. This marked a pinnacle in the history of Espérance Sportive de Tunis, as they achieved a remarkable treble, the first-ever in Tunisian club football history.

Following this unprecedented success, the club's leadership saw a change, with a new board of directors, led by Hamdi Meddeb, elected on 25 September 2011 for a three-year mandate. Despite this leadership shift, the club's fortunes faced a setback. Coach Nabil Maâloul resigned after the team's disappointing sixth-place finish in the 2011 FIFA Club World Cup, a tournament where Espérance had hoped to make a stronger impact.

==== Arab and African glory: Espérance de Tunis' historic centenary (2016–2019) ====

2018 CAF Champions League winning lineup

The 2016–2017 season marked the arrival of several key players such as Ferjani Sassi, Mohamed Ali Moncer, Anice Badri, Mohamed Zaabia, and Hichem Belkaroui. The team finished the first phase of the league in the top spot. In January 2017, the club decided to replace Souayah with Faouzi Benzarti, believing that under his leadership, the team could clinch the CAF Champions League. On 18 May, the club won their 27th Tunisian championship title with a 3–0 victory against Étoile Sportive du Sahel. The team lost in the semi-finals of the 2016–2017 Tunisian Cup to Union sportive de Ben Guerdane. Having finished the group stage in first place, the team faced Al Ahly in the quarter-finals of the Champions League.

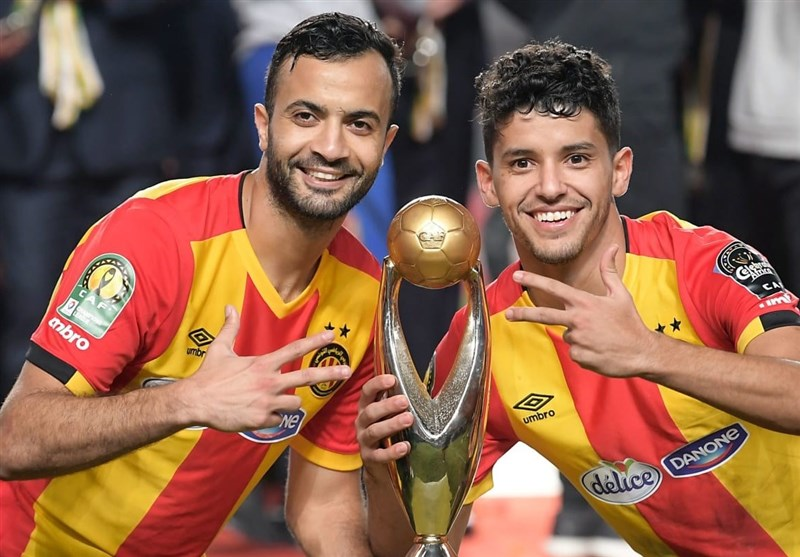
Espérance Sportive de Tunis, winners of the 2018 CAF Champions League.

On 6 August, the club won their fourth Arab title and third 2017 Arab Club Championship after defeating Al-Faisaly SC (3–2) after extra time.

During the transfer window, the club signed Franck Kom, Maher Bessghaier, Michael Eneramo, and Änis Ben-Hatira; Haythem Jouini returned after his loan at Club Deportivo Tenerife. After a draw in Egypt (2–2), the team lost at home to Al Ahly (2–1), thus being eliminated from the quarter-finals of the Champions League.

Despite good results that saw the club finish first in the first half of the 2017–18 Tunisian Ligue Professionnelle 1, Faouzi Benzarti resigned under pressure from fans, who blamed him for the team's poor performances despite the victories. Mondher Kebaier briefly took over as coach before Khaled Ben Yahia returned. After several positive results, including a 3–2 victory against Étoile Sportive du Sahel and an away win against CS Sfaxien (2–0), the club secured their 28th title on 8 April, three matches before the end of the season.

2018–19 CAF Champions League winning lineup

ES Tunis won their third CAF Champions League title against Al Ahly despite a 3–1 loss in the first leg on the pitch of the eight-time African champions; this match was marked by controversial decisions from referee Algerian Mehdi Abid Charef, who awarded two penalties to Al Ahly despite the presence of VAR, followed by media outrage. In the return match, the Tunisians won 3–0 in front of a crowd of 60,000 people, with standout performances from Saad Bguir and Anice Badri.

This victory secured the club's third Champions League title in history, just months before its centenary. They lost to Raja CA on 30 March 2019, in the CAF Super Cup after a goal by Abdelilah Hafidi, followed by an equalizer from Youcef Belaïli, and finally, a second goal by Badr Benoun for Raja.

After winning the 2018–19 Tunisian Ligue Professionnelle 1, the club finished the 2018–2019 season as African champions for the fourth time after winning the 2018–19 CAF Champions League against Wydad AC.

== Colors and symbols ==
=== Logos throughout history ===
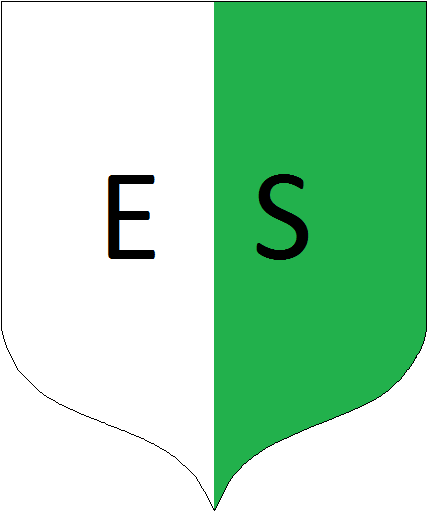
1919

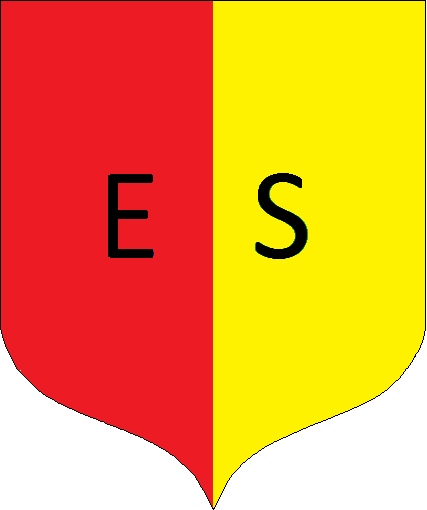
1924

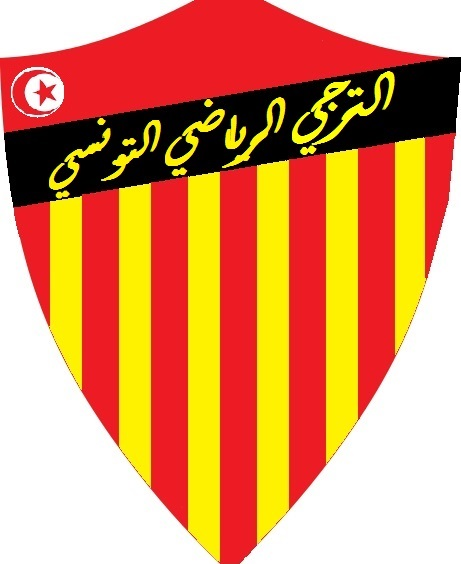
1950

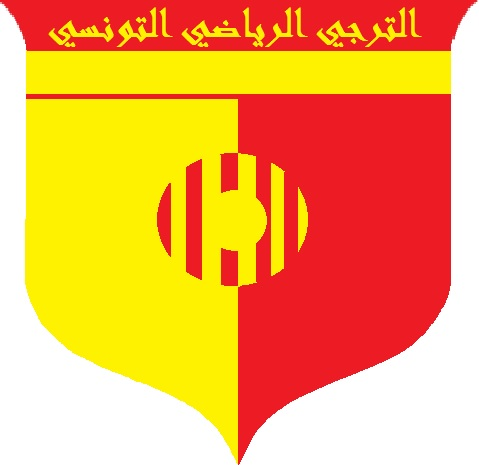
1969

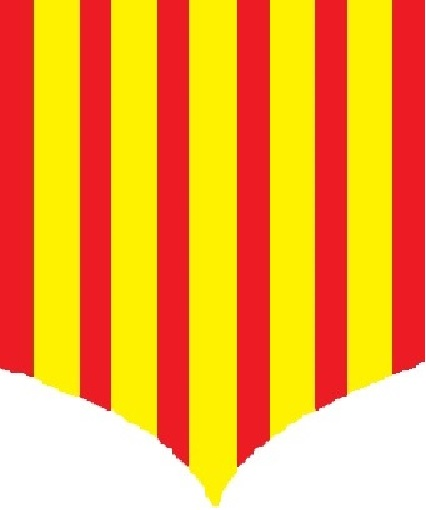
1987

2020–present

=== Red and yellow ===
During the first year of its establishment, Espérance played in white and green, their uniform green with the elegance of the shirt and hands and black veil, due to a persistent shortage of green jerseys. Chadli Zouiten's share was the red and yellow sports uniforms, which were better than Esperance's uniforms. He gifted them to Esperance, and since then red and yellow become their official colors.

=== Kit manufacturers and shirt sponsors ===
Period	Kit manufacturer	Shirt sponsor	Ref
1993–94	(Germany) Uhlsport	(Tunisia) Boga/Noumêm	
1994–95	(Italy) Lotto	(United States) Coca-Cola	
1995–96	(Italy) Lotto	(United States) Coca-Cola	
1996–97	(Italy) Lotto	(United States) Coca-Cola/ (Germany) Opel	
1997–98	(Italy) Lotto	(United States) Coca-Cola/ (France) Danone	
1998–99	(Germany) Uhlsport	(United States) Coca-Cola/ (France) Danone	
1999-00	(Tunisia) Esperance	(United States) Coca-Cola/ (France) Danone	
2000–01	(Italy) Lotto	(United States) Coca-Cola/ (France) Danone	
2001–02	(Italy) Lotto	(United States) Coca-Cola/ (France) Danone	
2002–03	(Germany) Adidas	(United States) Coca-Cola/ (France) Danone	
2003–04	(Germany) Adidas	(France) Danone/ (Tunisia) Boga	
2004–05	(Mexico) Atletica	(France) Danone/ (United Kingdom) Virgin	
2005–06	(United States) Nike	(France) Danone/ (United Kingdom) Virgin	
2006–10	(United States) Nike	(Tunisia) Groupe Délice/ (France) Danone	
2010–11	(United States) Nike	(Tunisia) Groupe Délice/ (France) Danone/ (South Korea) Kia	
2011–16	(United States) Nike	(Tunisia) Groupe Délice/ (France) Danone	
2016–17	(United States) Nike	(Tunisia) Groupe Délice/ (France) Danone	
2017–22	(England) Umbro	(Tunisia) Groupe Délice/ (France) Danone	
2022–	(Italy) Kappa	(Tunisia) Groupe Délice/ (France) Danone	

== Presidents ==
Presidents of Espérance throughout history
Country	President	Term
(France)	Louis Montassier [fr]	1919
(Tunisia)	Mohamed Melki [fr]	1919–1923
(Tunisia)	Chedly Zouiten [fr]	1924
(Tunisia)	Muhamed Zouaoui	1925
(Tunisia)	Mustapha Kaak [fr]	1926–1930
(Tunisia)	Chedly Zouiten [fr]	1930–1963
(Tunisia)	Mohamed Ben Ismaïl [fr]	1963–1968
(Tunisia)	Ali Zouaoui	1968–1971
(Tunisia)	Hassen Belkhodja	1971–1981
(Tunisia)	Naceur Knani [fr]	1981–1984
(Tunisia)	Abdelhamid Achour [fr]	1984–1985
(Tunisia)	Moncef Zouhir [fr]	1985–1986
(Tunisia)	Mondher Znaïdi [fr]	1986–1987
(Tunisia)	Hedi Jilani [fr]	1987–1989
(Tunisia)	Slim Chiboub	1989–2004
(Tunisia)	Aziz Zouhir [fr]	2004–2007
(Tunisia)	Hamdi Meddeb	2007–present

- Source: Espérance Sportive de Tunis
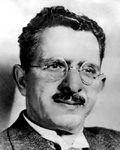
Mohamed Malki.

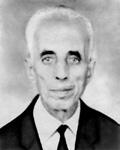
Mohamed Zouaoui.

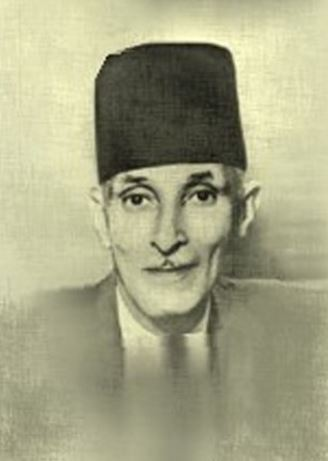
Mustapha Kaak.

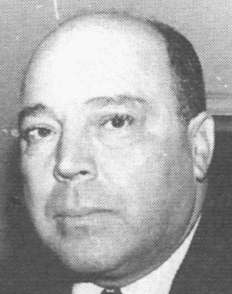
Hassen Belkhodja.

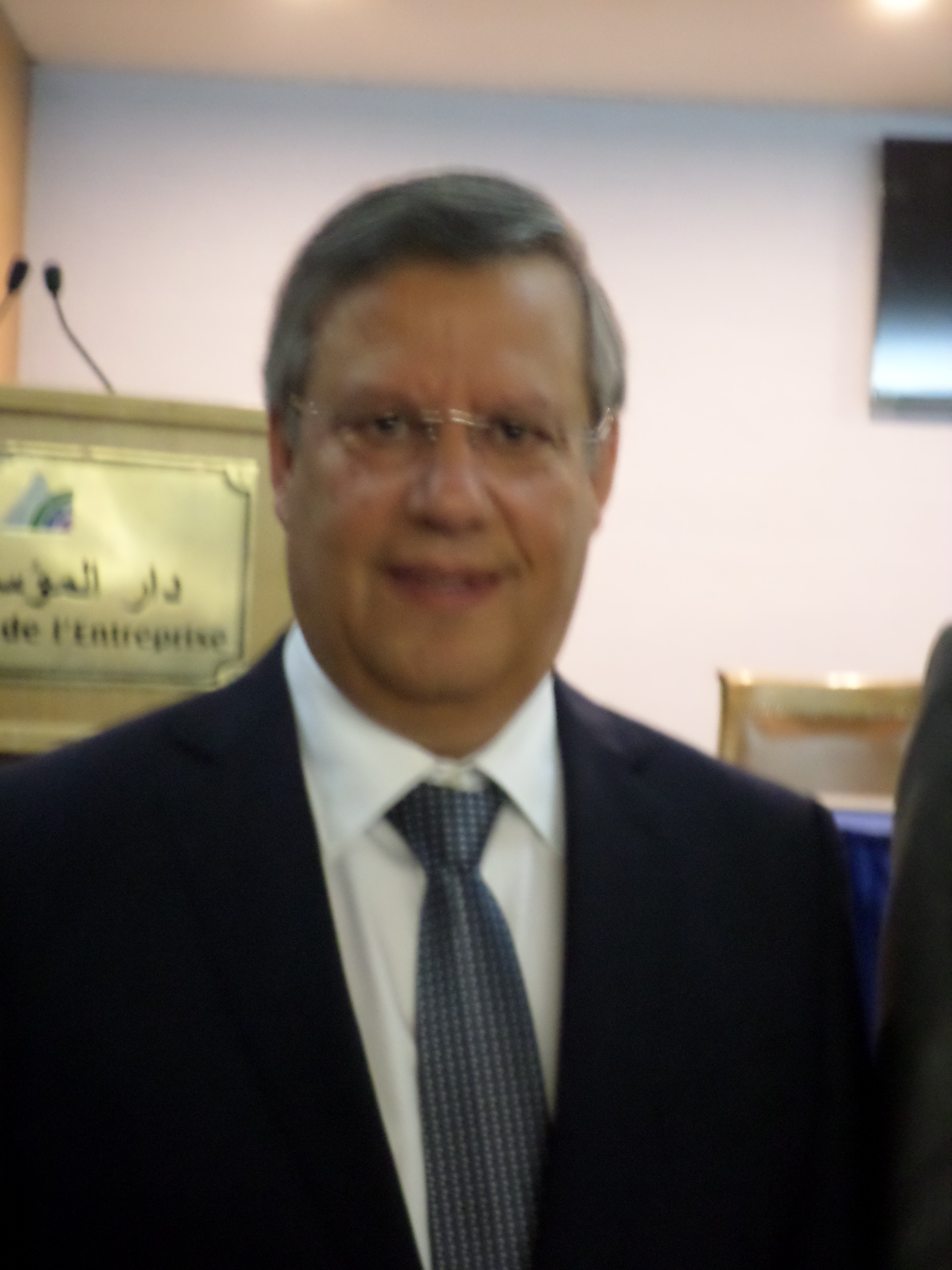
Hamdi Meddeb.

== Managers ==
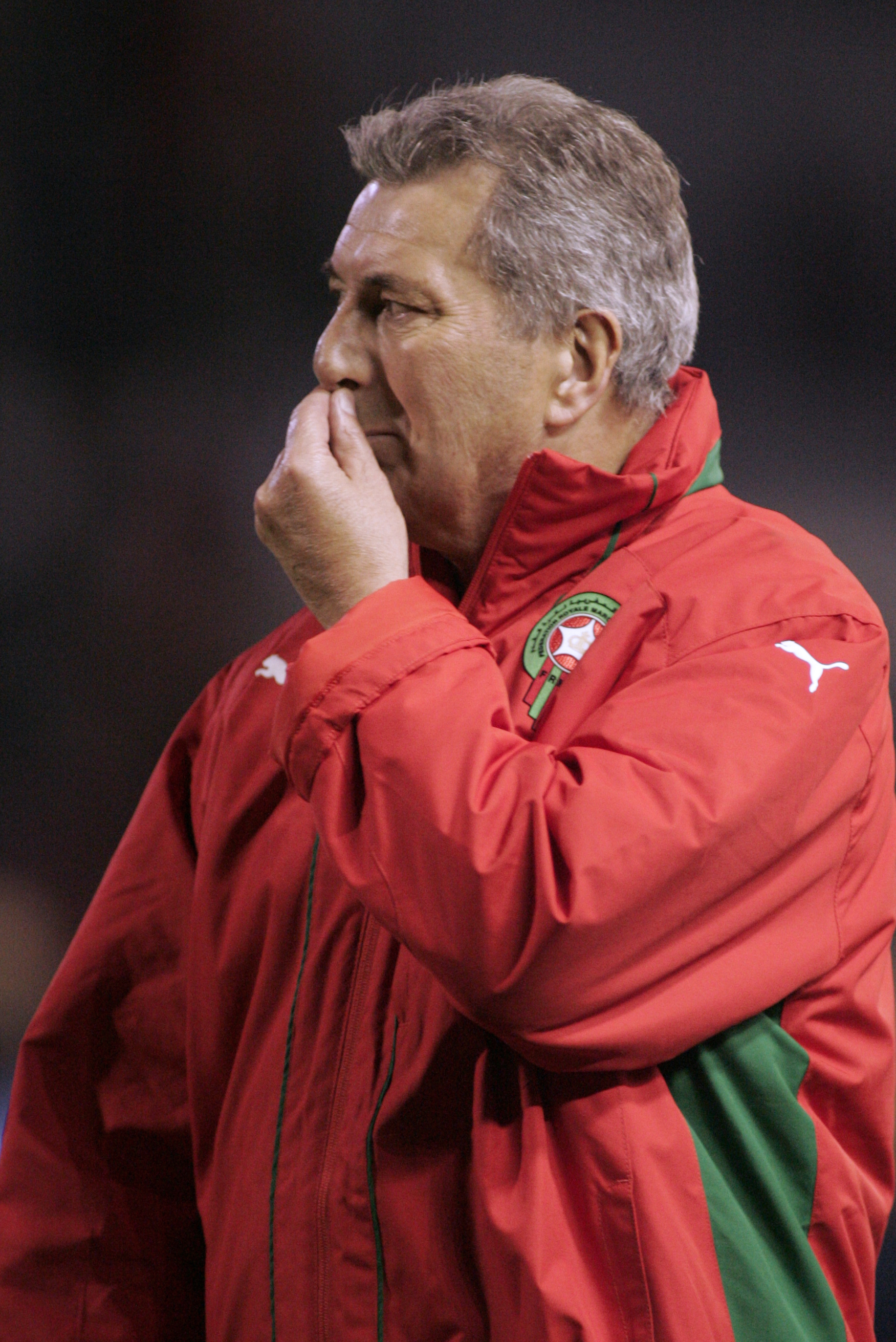
Roger Lemerre

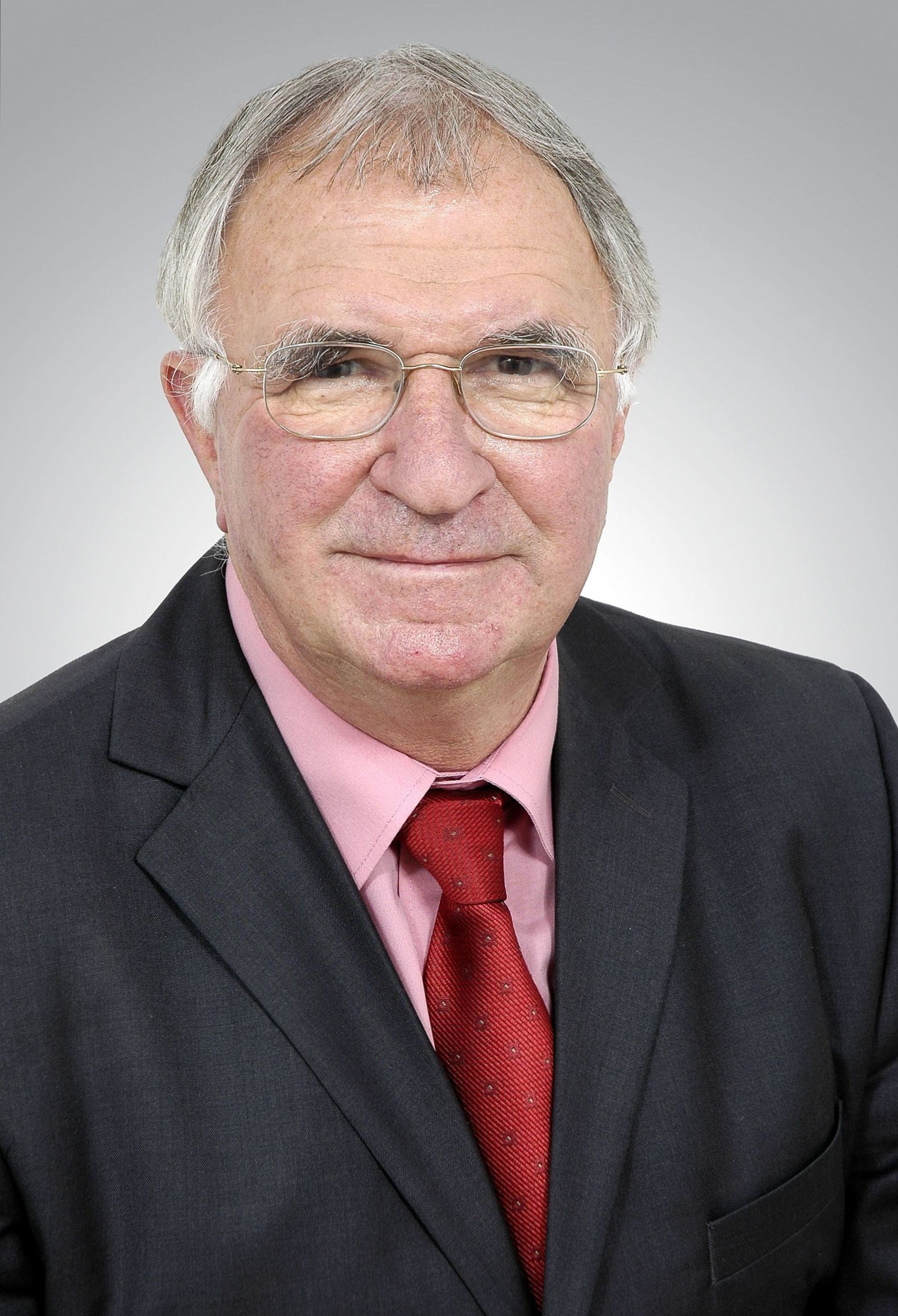
Antoni Piechniczek

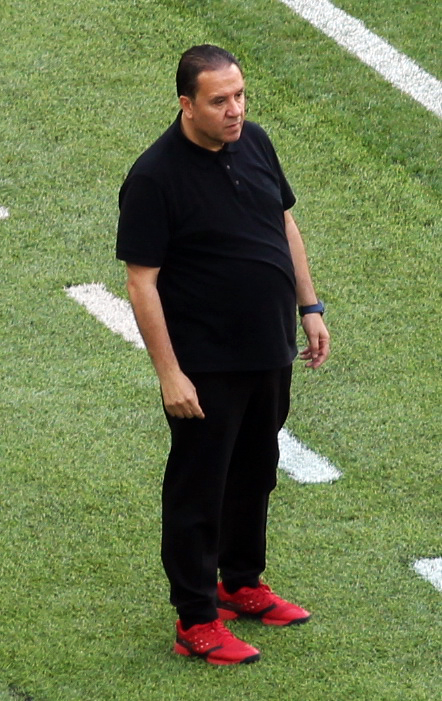
Nabil Maâloul

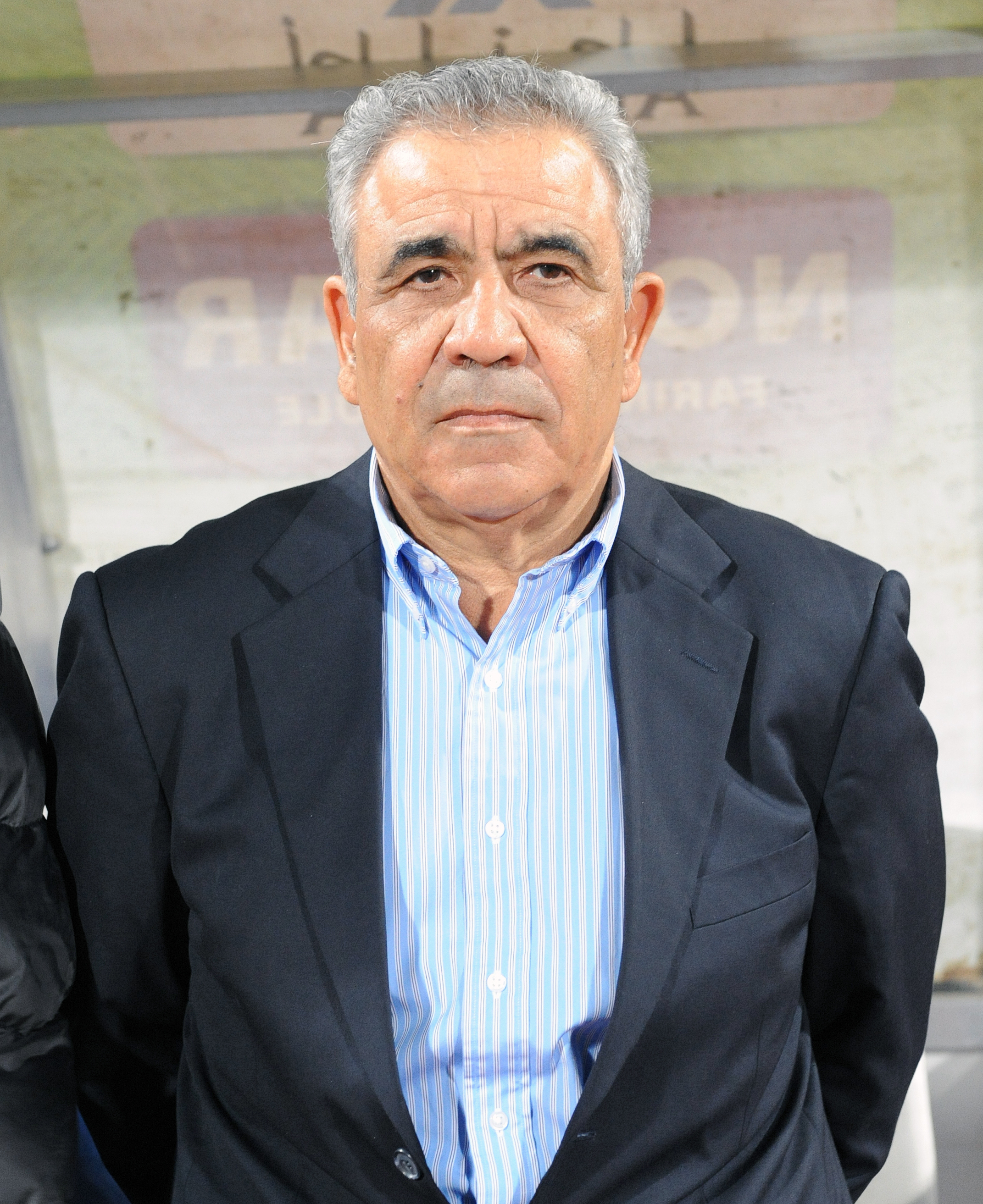
Faouzi Benzarti

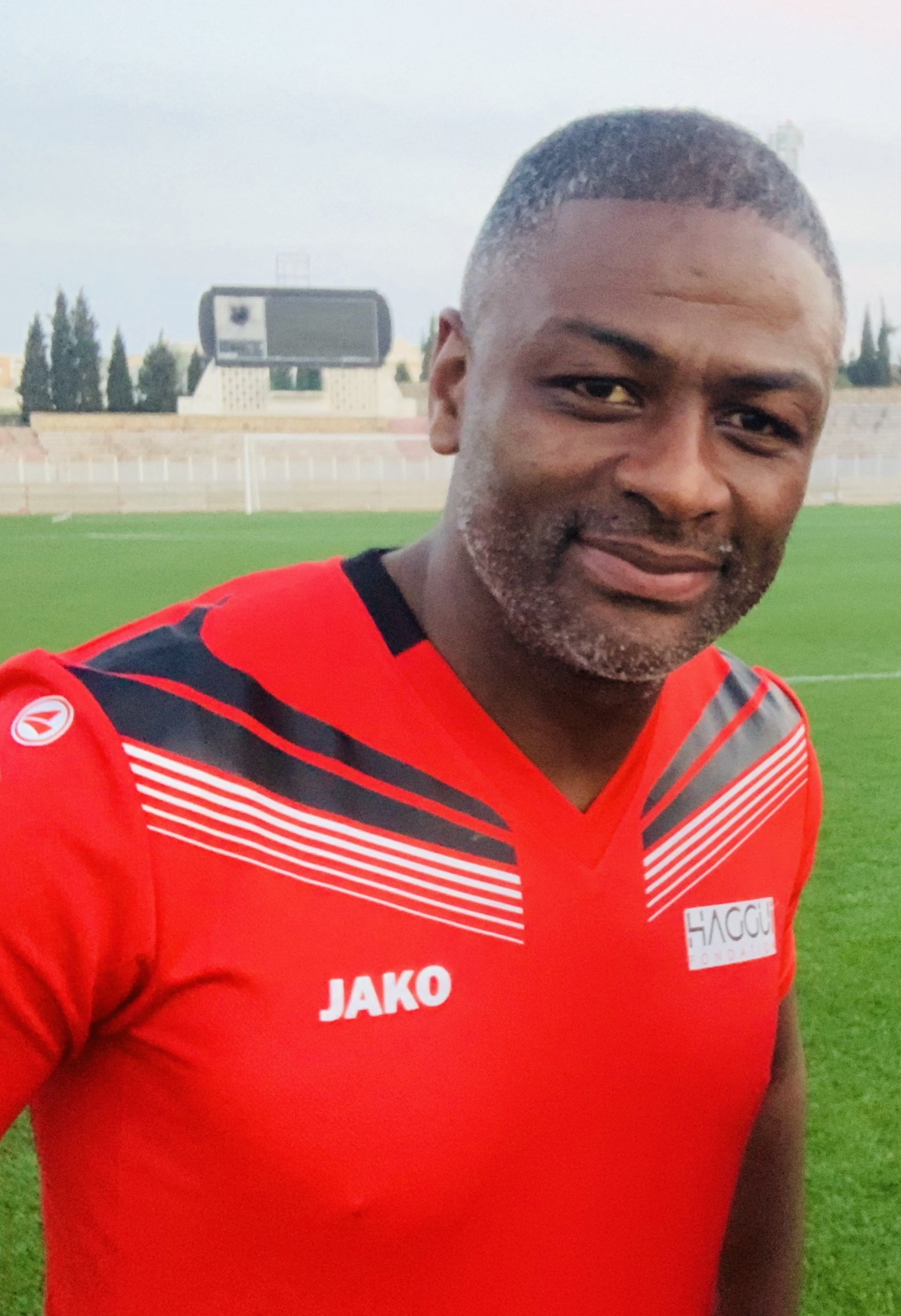
Radhi Jaïdi

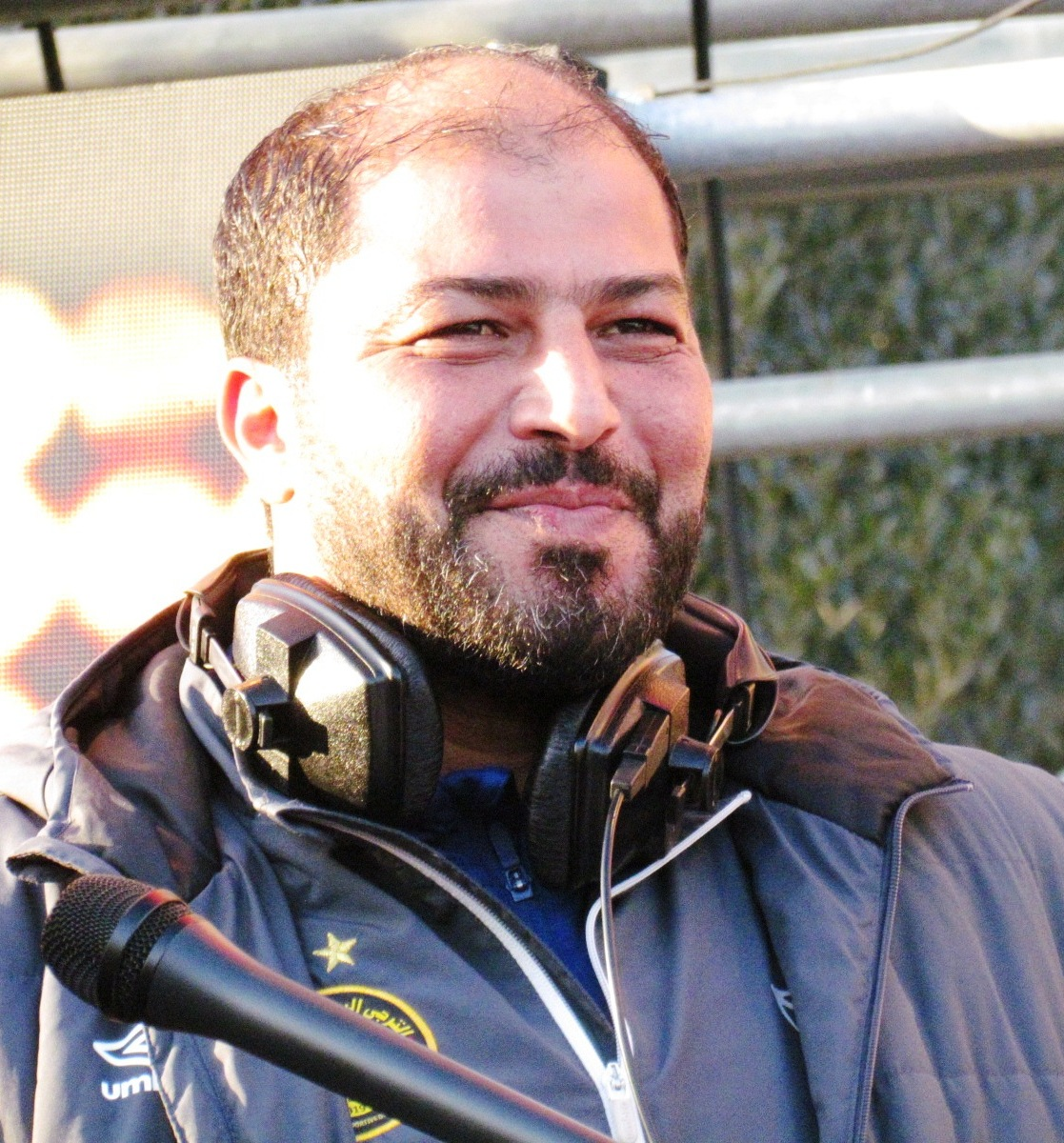
Mouine Chaabani

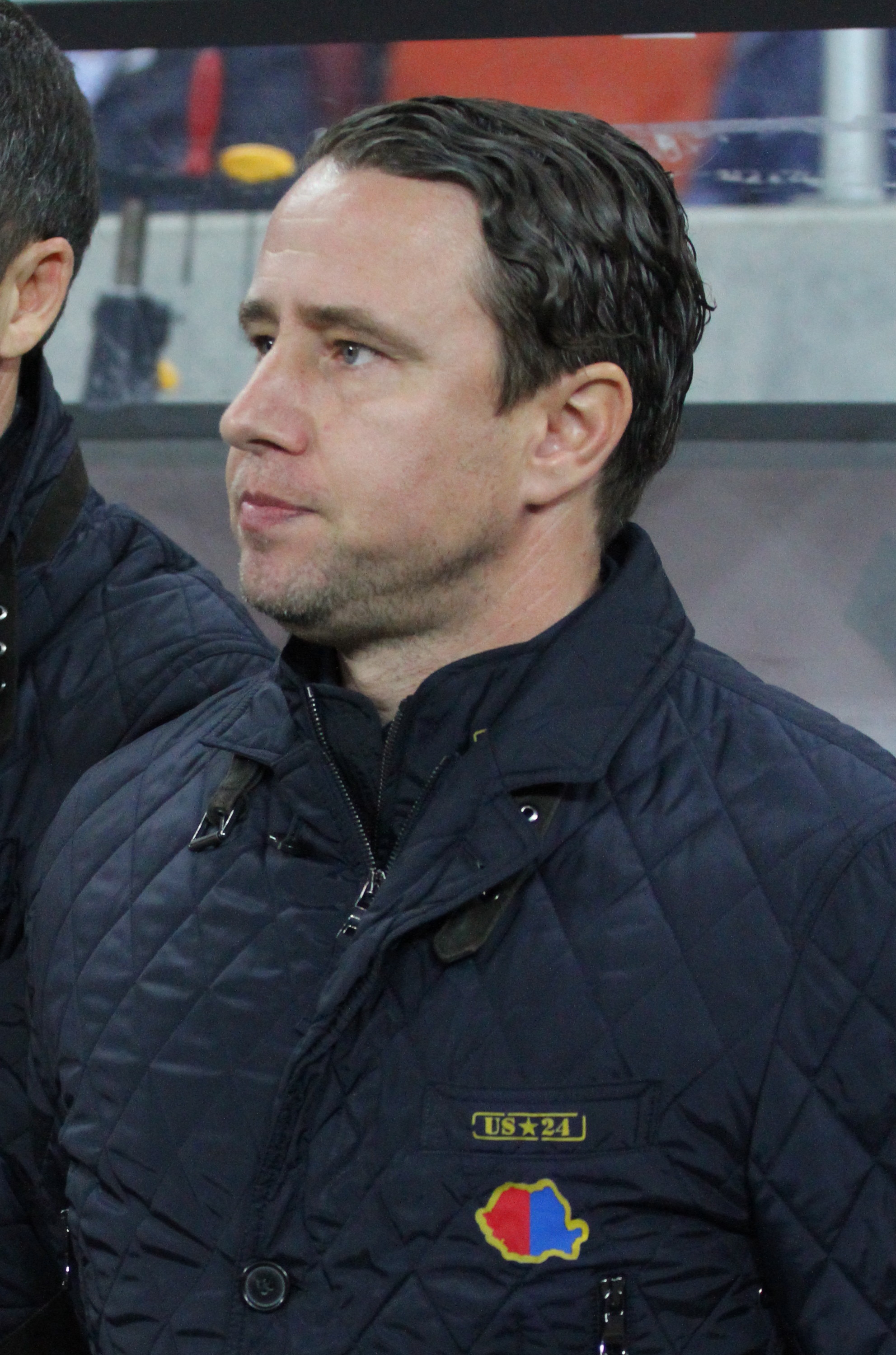
Laurențiu Reghecampf

Managers of Espérance throughout history
Country	Manager	Years
(Tunisia)	Hammadi Ben Ghachem	1938–1939
(Tunisia)	Hachemi Cherif	1942–1959
(Algeria)	Habib Draoua	1959–1961
(Tunisia)	Hachemi Cherif	1961–1962
(France)	Jean Baratte	1962–1963
(Tunisia)	Abderrahmane Ben Ezzedine	1963–1966
(Hungary)	Sandor Pazmandy	1966 – November 1968
(France)	Robert Domergue	November 1968 – May 1969
(Tunisia)	Abderrahmane Ben Ezzedine	May 1969 – 1971
(Tunisia)	Slah Guiza	September 1971 – November 1971
(Czechoslovakia)	Vladimír Mirka	November 1971 – 1973
(Tunisia)	Hmid Dhib	1973 – May 1976
(Tunisia)	Abderrahmane Ben Ezzedine	May 1976 – July 1976
(Socialist Federal Republic of Yugoslavia)	Stjepan Bobek	1976–1978
(Tunisia)	Mokhtar Tlili	1978–1981
(Tunisia)	Hmid Dhib	1981–1982
(Tunisia)	Mrad Mahjoub	1982 – December 1983
(France)	Roger Lemerre	December 1983 – 1984
(Brazil)	Amarildo Tavares da Silveira	1984–1987
(Poland)	Antoni Piechniczek	1987–1990
(Poland)	Władysław Żmuda	1990–1991
(Socialist Federal Republic of Yugoslavia)	Andon Dončevski	1991–1992
(Poland)	Zdzisław Podedworny	1992–1993
(Tunisia)	Faouzi Benzarti	1993–1996
(Italy)	Luigi Maifredi	1996
(Tunisia)	Khaled Ben Yahia	1996–1997
(Tunisia)	Youssef Zouaoui	1997–2002
(Switzerland)	Michel Decastel	2002–2004
(Switzerland)	Claude Andrey	2004–2005
(Tunisia)	Khaled Ben Yahia	2005–2006
(France)	Jacky Duguépéroux	2006–2007
(Tunisia)	Faouzi Benzarti	2007
(Tunisia)	Larbi Zouaoui	July 2007 – August 2007
(Brazil)	Carlos Cabral	September 2007 – December 2007
(Tunisia)	Youssef Zouaoui	December 2007 – May 2008
(Brazil)	Carlos Cabral	May 2008 – November 2008
(Portugal)	José Morais	November 2008 – March 2009
(Tunisia)	Faouzi Benzarti	March 2009 – November 2010
(Tunisia)	Maher Kanzari	November 2010 – December 2010
(Tunisia)	Nabil Maaloul	December 2010 – January 2012
(Switzerland)	Michel Decastel	January 2012 – May 2012
(Tunisia)	Nabil Maaloul	May 2012 – February 2013
(Tunisia)	Maher Kanzari	February 2013 – October 2013
(France)	Sébastien Desabre	December 2013 – January 2014
(Netherlands)	Ruud Krol	January 2014 – May 2014
(France)	Sébastien Desabre	May 2014 – August 2014
(Tunisia)	Khaled Ben Yahia	August 2014 – February 2015
(Portugal)	José Morais	February 2015 – June 2015
(France)	José Anigo	June 2015 – August 2015
(Tunisia)	Ammar Souayah	August 2015 – January 2017
(Tunisia)	Faouzi Benzarti	January 2017 – December 2017
(Tunisia)	Mondher Kebaier	January 2018 – February 2018
(Tunisia)	Khaled Ben Yahia	February 2018 – October 2018
(Tunisia)	Mouin Chaâbani	October 2018 – July 2021
(Tunisia)	Radhi Jaïdi	August 2021 – June 2022
(Tunisia)	Nabil Maâloul	June 2022 – May 2023
(Tunisia)	Anis Boussaïdi^{interim}	May 2023
(Tunisia)	Mouin Chaâbani	May 2023 – October 2023
(Tunisia)	Tarek Thabet	October 2023 – January 2024
(Portugal)	Miguel Cardoso	January 2024 – October 2024
(Tunisia)	Skander Kasri^{interim}	October 2024 – November 2024
(Romania)	Laurențiu Reghecampf	November 2024 – March 2025
(Tunisia)	Maher Kanzari	March 2025 – February 2026
(France)	Christian Bracconi^{interim}	February 2026
(France)	Patrice Beaumelle	February 2026 – May 2026
(France)	Christian Bracconi^{interim}	May 2026 – June 2026
(Romania)	Laurențiu Reghecampf	June 2026 – September 2026
(Spain)	Pablo Franco	October 2026 – present

- Source: Espérance Sportive de Tunis

== Competition topscorers ==
=== List of Tunisian Ligue 1 Top scorers ===
Year	Player
1959	(Tunisia) Abdelmajid Tlemçani
1960	(Tunisia) Abdelmajid Tlemçani
1962	(Tunisia) Chedly Laaouini
1975	(Tunisia) Zoubeir Boughnia
1982	(Tunisia) Riadh El Fahem
1988	(Tunisia) Nabil Maâloul
1993	(Zambia) Kenneth Malitoli
1994	(Zambia) Kenneth Malitoli
1997	(Tunisia) Sami Laaroussi
1998	(Tunisia) Ziad Tlemçani
2000	(Tunisia) Ali Zitouni
2002	(Ivory Coast) Kandia Traoré
2006	(Tunisia) Amine Ltifi
2009	(Nigeria) Michael Eneramo
2010	(Nigeria) Michael Eneramo
2012	(Tunisia) Youssef Msakni
2013	(Tunisia) Haythem Jouini
2017	(Tunisia) Taha Yassine Khenissi
2019	(Tunisia) Taha Yassine Khenissi
2022	(Tunisia) Mohamed Ali Ben Hammouda
2024	(Brazil) Rodrigo Rodrigues

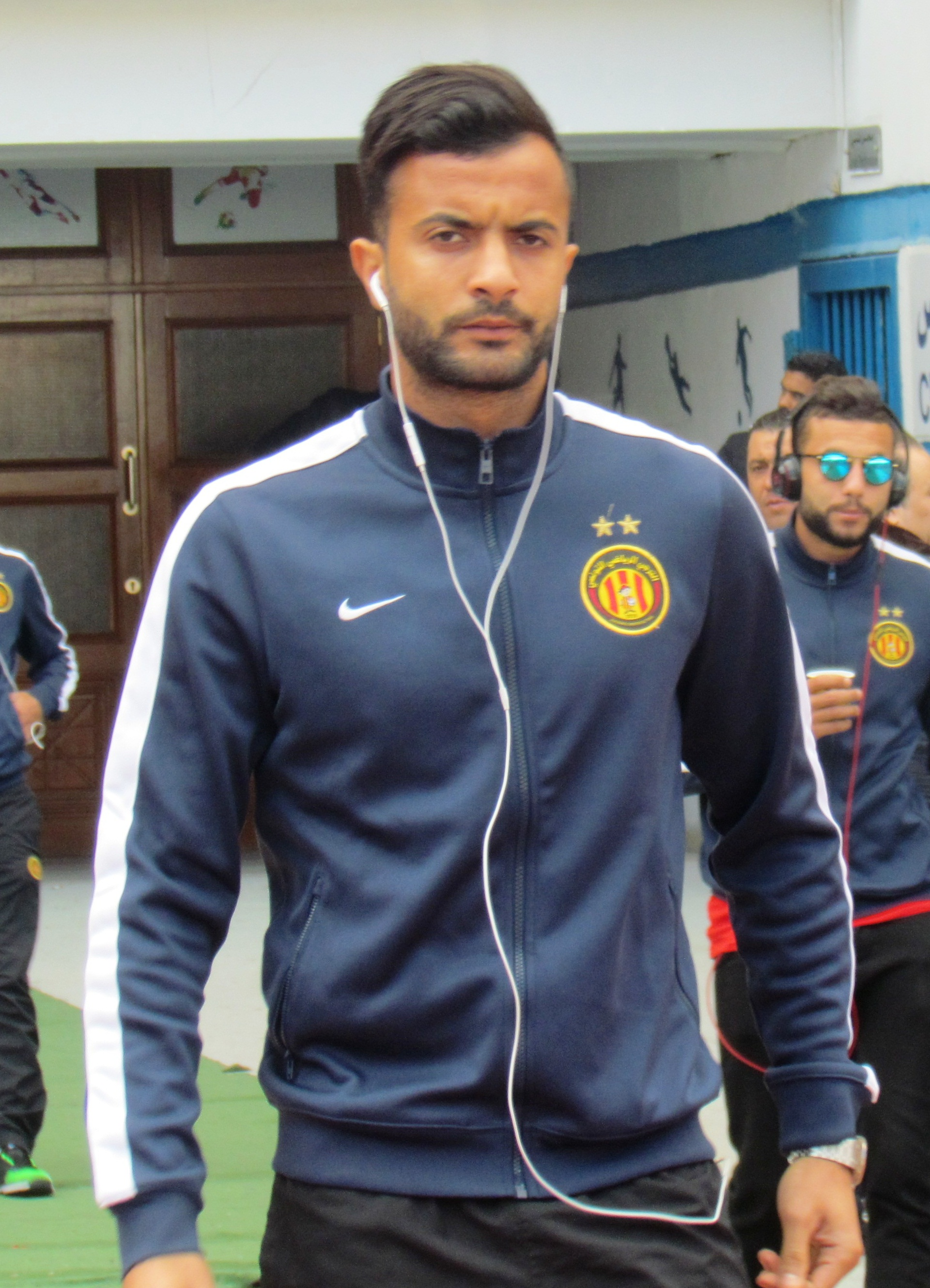
Taha Yassine Khenissi

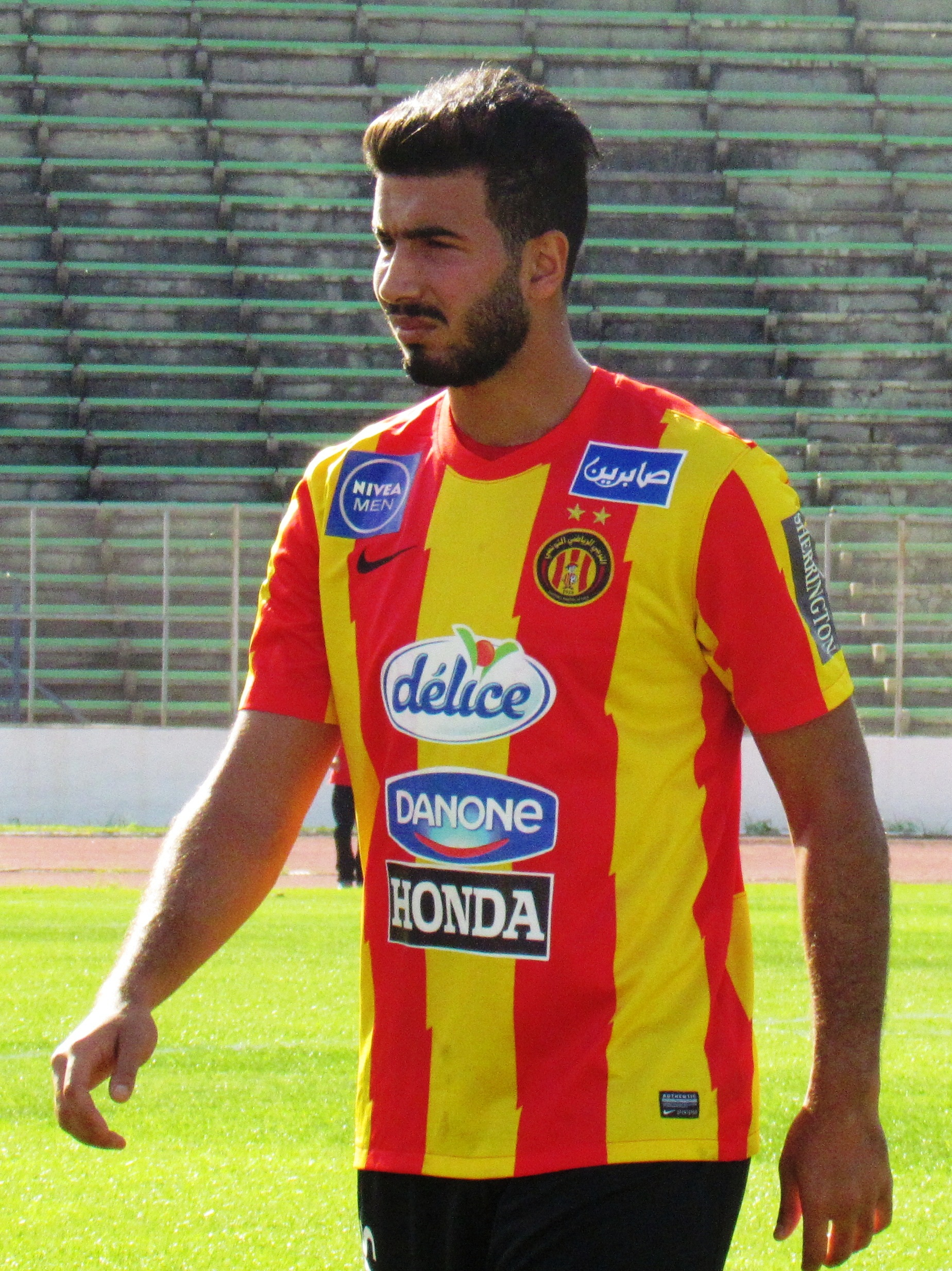
Haythem Jouini

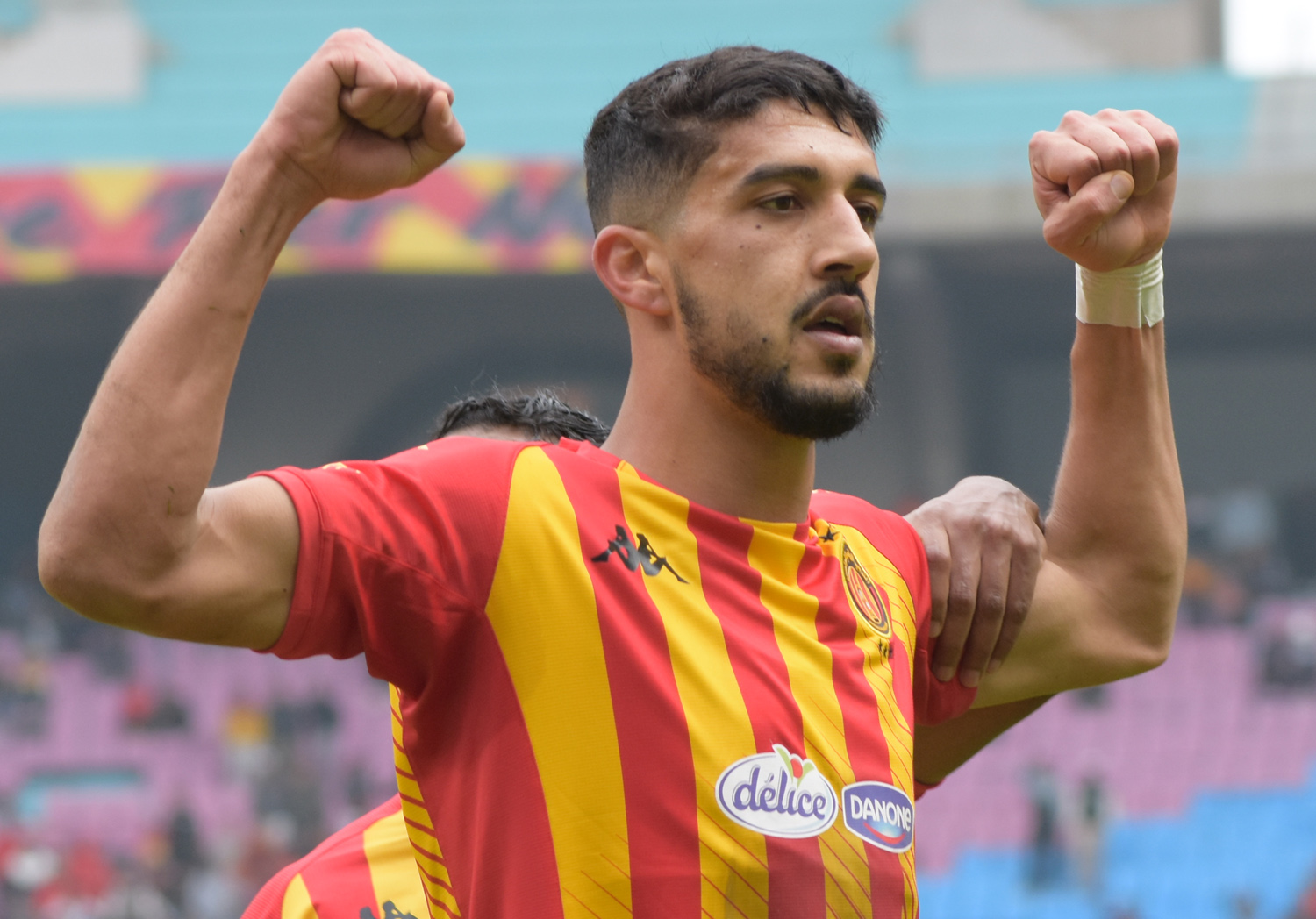
Mohamed Ali Ben Hammouda

== Budget ==
In 2012, the club's budget amounted to 7.6 million euros. It then increased to 9.398 million euros in 2013 and 12.17 million euros in 2014, and finally reached 17.6 million euros in 2018.

By the 2022–2023 season, the club's budget reached 50 million Tunisian dinars (approximately 16 million euros).

In a major milestone, Espérance Sportive de Tunis became the first Tunisian sports club to be listed on the Tunis Stock Exchange through its parent company, Taraji Holding, on 31 December 2024. This strategic move is expected to diversify revenue sources, promote financial transparency, and support sustainable growth. Specific figures for the 2024 and 2025 budgets have not yet been disclosed but are anticipated to surpass prior records.

== Marketing ==
In recent years, the club has developed its marketing policy as part of the "Perspectives 2019" project, which allows the club to develop an economic division to diversify its funding sources.

After several seasons with Nike, Umbro became the official sponsor of the team at the start of the 2017–2018 season. And in 2022, Kappa became the official kit supplier and partner of the club, marking the beginning of a new chapter in the team's branding and merchandise strategy.

=== Taraji Store ===
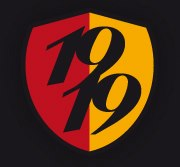
Taraji Store logo

On 29 June 2012, the Taraji Store, the official store for merchandise of Espérance sportive de Tunis, was officially launched. In January 2017, on the occasion of the club's 98th anniversary, Riadh Bennour announced that two new sales points would be installed.

Since then, several sales points have been established across the national territory. Additionally, the Taraji Store website offers the possibility to deliver its products both in Tunisia and internationally.

In 2025, to commemorate the club's 106th anniversary, Espérance sportive de Tunis released special third and fourth kits. The third kit features a white base with metallic golden logos and green detailing, while the fourth kit is in military brown-green with white logos and a gold club crest. These kits are available for purchase through the Taraji Store.

=== Taraji Holding ===
In December 2024, Taraji Holding, the economic and financial structure of Espérance sportive de Tunis, officially submitted its dossier for listing on the Tunis Stock Exchange. This marks a historic move, as it is the first time a sports club in Tunisia has established an entity structured and oriented towards the financial market, aiming for sustainable finances.

=== Taraji Mobile ===
The Taraji Mobile offer was launched in early 2014 following an agreement between the operator Tunisie Telecom and Espérance sportive de Tunis. SIM cards in the club's colors have since been made available to supporters with benefits.

Additionally, the official YouTube channel of Taraji Mobile continues to provide supporters with the latest updates and promotional content related to the mobile offer.

=== Taraji+ ===
In 2022, the club launched Taraji+, its new mobile application, on iOS and Android. Upon its release, the Taraji+ application achieved a significant milestone by surpassing 100,000 downloads within just two days, reflecting its immediate popularity among fans.

This new application allows users to follow all the club's news and access the latest photos, videos, and podcasts.

Additionally, the premium version offers subscribers other advantages, such as early access to Taraji Live, the club's daily show, as well as all multimedia content, interviews, news, and behind-the-scenes footage of the club. The first year allows the club to generate an estimated profit of ten million dinars.

In December 2024, the official application of Espérance Sportive de Tunis, known as Taraji+, was updated to version 2.8. This update enhanced the app's features, providing fans with improved access to the latest news, match schedules, and scores of the club.

== Popular culture ==
=== Tarajji ya dawla ===
This slogan, which made the stands of the Chedly Zouiten stadium vibrate or set ablaze the Espérance supporters in the El Menzah Stadium, is symptomatic of the degree of identification between the team of the "sang et or" (red and gold) and the Bourguibist regime. Often hastily and reductively translated as "State," the term dawla here refers more broadly to power, to supremacy based on superior force. The State is not just a theatrical dialogue element, a metaphor intended to signify the unchallenged domination of a particularist group over others..." The club is not merely a team to whom the paternity of Tunisian football is owed. It would also, and above all, be a political actor, sometimes serving as a banner of sport—and beyond—of the Tunisian state, and sometimes as an instrument of formation and education contributing to the building of the new independent state.

== Support ==
ES Tunis is supported throughout Tunisia and in the Tunisian diaspora in Europe, the Middle East and North America. The club has over 2 million followers on Facebook.

=== Supporter groups ===
Officially, the club's fans and supporters are framed by the Espérance Sportive de Tunis, but many ultras groups have appeared alongside it that organize the club's income during major interviews. The oldest group of them is the Ultras L'Emkachkhines, which belong to the ultras movement but do not have any legal system as is the case for the European bands' lovers groups. We also find the Supras, which appeared in 2004, the Blood & Gold group appeared in 2005, Zapatista Esperanza in 2007 and Torcida in 2008, and in the same year the Matadors group appeared. In 2009 the Fedayn, Ayounos Algres and Strano Boys group appeared, and in 2010 the Los guerreros group, the Resista Armada group and others... All of these groups share the southern runways behind a guard the goal under the banner of Curva Sud. Among the acronics that some of these groups raise is A.C.A.B, which is also raised by other groups in Europe and even in Tunisia. The elderly Ultras made many incomes and carcasses and created more than 35 for them at the local level only, without counting the years of repression from 2009 to 2011 when Ultras in Tunisia were prevented from entering.

==== Ultras L'Emkachkhines ====
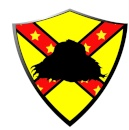

Ultras L'Emkachkhines, and its symbol (ULE02), is an ultras group established in 2002 by a group of fans of Espérance Sportive de Tunis. Ultras was established in the summer of 2002, and it was the result of the idea of a group of Esperance fans who love the team and were influenced by the activity of long-standing ultras groups in Europe, such as Ultras Romani and Fossa Dei Leoni. After many consultations and discussions via the Internet, they decided to organize Their first meeting was in the Tunisian capital, where it was agreed to establish the group under the name Ultras Giallorosso, but soon the name was changed through a proposal by one of the members to replace the word Galloroso with L'Emkachkhines for the symbolism of this word among the supporters of Esperance and to impart a spirit of belonging and identity More for the group, and the image of the warrior leader Geranimo was chosen as the group's emblem. Ultras L'Emkachkhines had the first match and the initiation of creativity in the Esperance match against the Egyptian Zamalek in 2002; Ultras Lemkachkhines is a first group fans ultras in curva sud tunisi.

==== Ultras Zapatista Esperanza 2007 ====
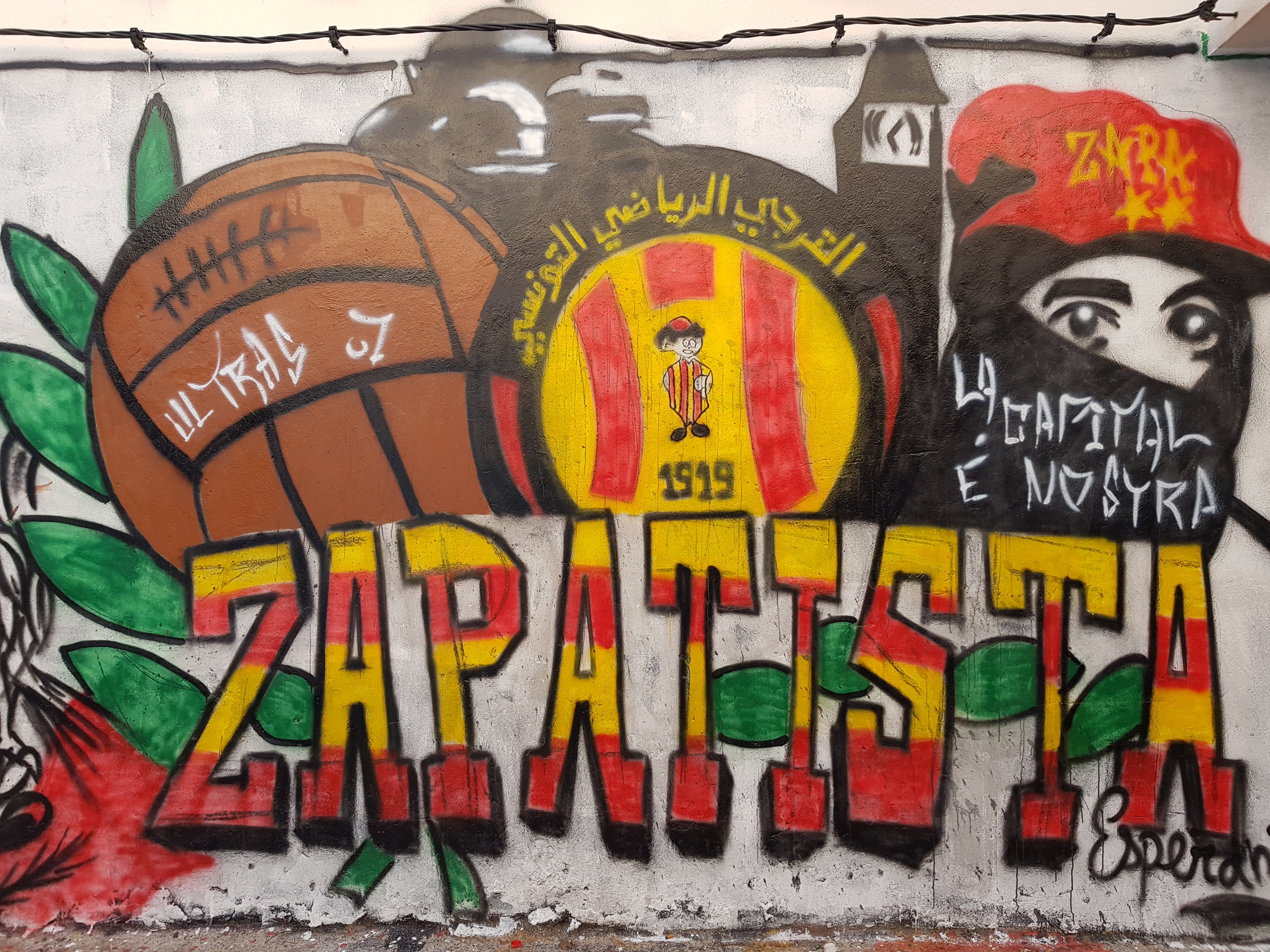

Zapatista Esperanza (ZE07), the ultras group supporting Esperance Sportive de Tunis, was founded on 23 June 2007. symbols are (siamo solo noi) and (no justice no peace). The name comes from the Zapatista National Liberation Army (Ejército Zapatista de Liberación Nacional, EZLN) which is an armed revolutionary group from the state of Chiapas in southern Mexico. The movement takes the name of Emiliano Zapata – one of the leaders of the Mexican Revolution of 1910. It is considered the most mysterious group in Africa and one of the most dangerous, as it was classified as a criminal gang by the former Tunisian Ministry of Interior.

== Accidents ==
=== Tragedy of 13 June 1971 ===
The tragedy of 13 June 1971, when the red and yellow lost the Tunisian Cup final against CS Sfaxien at El Menzah Stadium, ignited violent riots among Espérance Sportive de Tunis supporters. The aftermath resulted in significant human and material losses. The disturbance led the Minister of Interior and Sports at the time to order the dissolution of the team. It wasn't until President Habib Bourguiba intervened and issued a decree to reinstate the club into the sports arena that Espérance was brought back to the national stage. The incident marked a turning point for Tunisian football, exposing the deep tensions between football clubs and their supporters, and highlighting the challenges of maintaining order at high-stakes matches. In the years following the tragedy, Espérance worked hard to restore its reputation and secure its place as one of the dominant forces in Tunisian football. The club implemented reforms aimed at fostering positive relations with fans and ensuring better management of matches to prevent such violent outbreaks from occurring again.

The tragic events of 1971 serve as a reminder of how the passion surrounding football can turn destructive when not carefully managed, and the critical role of leadership in guiding the club through crises. The lessons learned from that tragic day helped shape the club's policies and strategies for dealing with fans and ensuring the safety of all those involved in the sport.

=== Death of Hedi Berkhissa ===
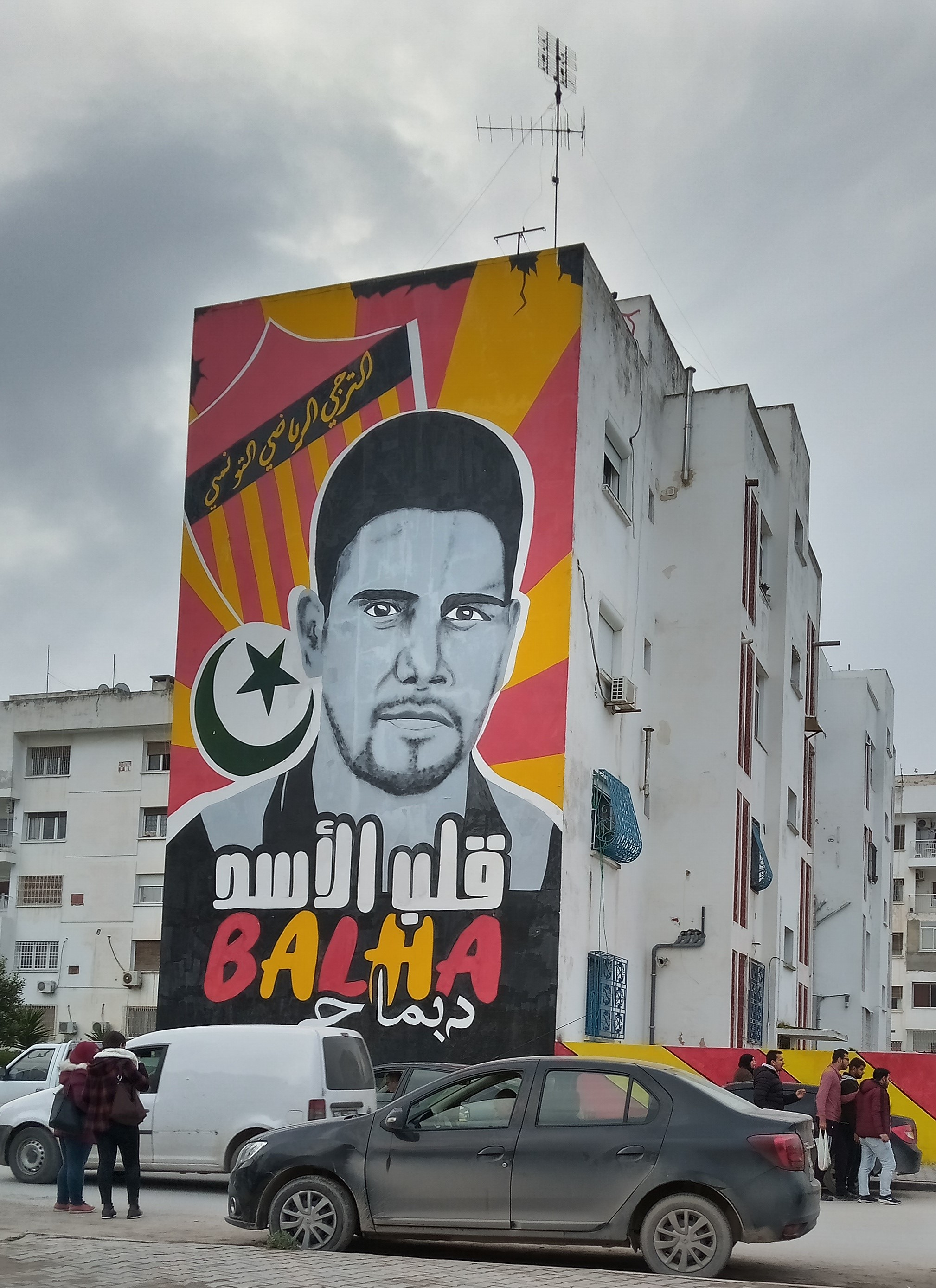
Hédi Berkhissa, nicknamed Balha. Mural in the city of Ariana.

One of the most tragic incidents in the club's history occurred on 4 January 1997, during a friendly match between Espérance and French side Lyon at Stade Chedli Zouiten. In the final minutes of the match,Hédi Berkhissa, a beloved player, suffered a heart attack on the field and died. His sudden death deeply affected the Tunisian football community, and his legacy remains an important part of Espérance's history.

=== The events of 8 April 2010 ===
Espérance Sportive de Tunis experienced a major incident on 8 April 2010, in a highly charged match against CS Hammam-Lif at El Menzah Stadium. The game, which ended in a dramatic 3–3 draw, became infamous for the violent clashes between supporters and security forces. The atmosphere was already tense due to the high stakes of the match, which led to widespread frustration among the fans when the lights at the stadium went out during the game.

The power outage further exacerbated the situation, leading to riots that resulted in several injuries and the arrest of many individuals. The fans were upset by the circumstances surrounding the match, which included the disruption caused by the lights going out at a crucial point in the game. The unrest spilled outside the stadium and turned into violent confrontations with the police, leaving a significant impact on both the club's supporters and the broader football community.

This event marked a high point of tension between the club's passionate supporters and the authorities, symbolizing the deep frustrations among fans about the perceived injustices in Tunisian Football Federation. The incident had a lasting effect on the relationship between Espérance Sportive de Tunis fans and the security forces, highlighting the challenges of managing large-scale football events with such intense emotional investment from the supporters.

== Infrastructure ==
=== Stadiums ===
==== Stade Hammadi Agrebi ====
Hammadi Agrebi Stadium
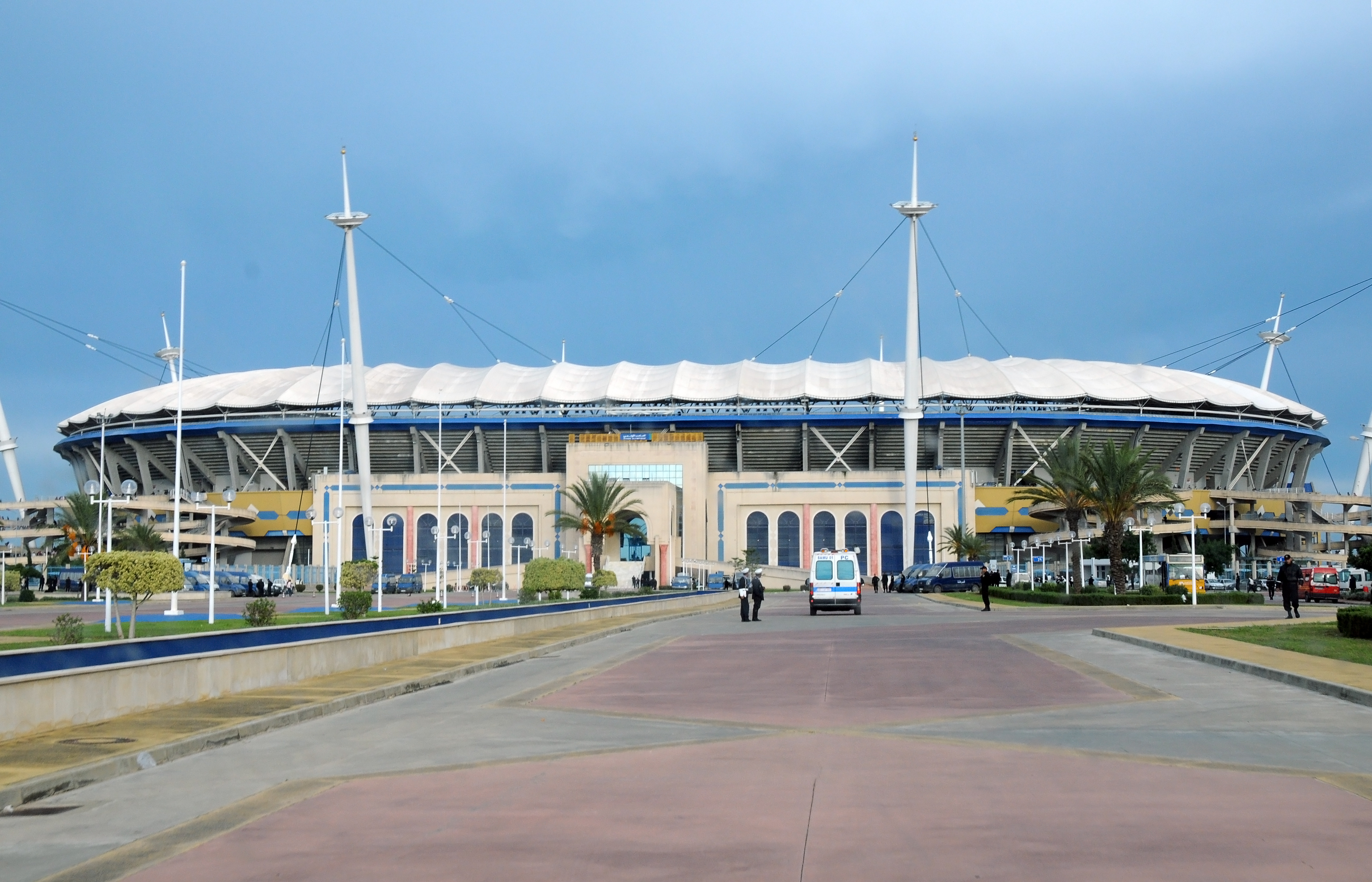
- Location: Radès, Tunis, Tunisia
- Capacity: 65,000
- Surface: Grass
- Record attendance: 65,000, 2004 Afcon final

Construction
- Opened: 6 July 2001
- Cost: 170 million Dinar

Tenants
- Tunisia national football team Espérance Sportive de Tunis

Stade Olympique Hammadi Agrebi, originally named Stade 7 November, is a multi-purpose stadium located in Radès, Tunis, Tunisia, around 10 kilometers southeast of downtown Tunis. Opened in 2001, it has a capacity of 65,000 spectators. The stadium is primarily used for football matches but also accommodates athletics. It was built for the 2001 Mediterranean Games and hosted the Tunisian Cup final in its opening year, and its one of the best stadium in North Africa and one of the most beautiful stadiums in Africa and the Arab world.

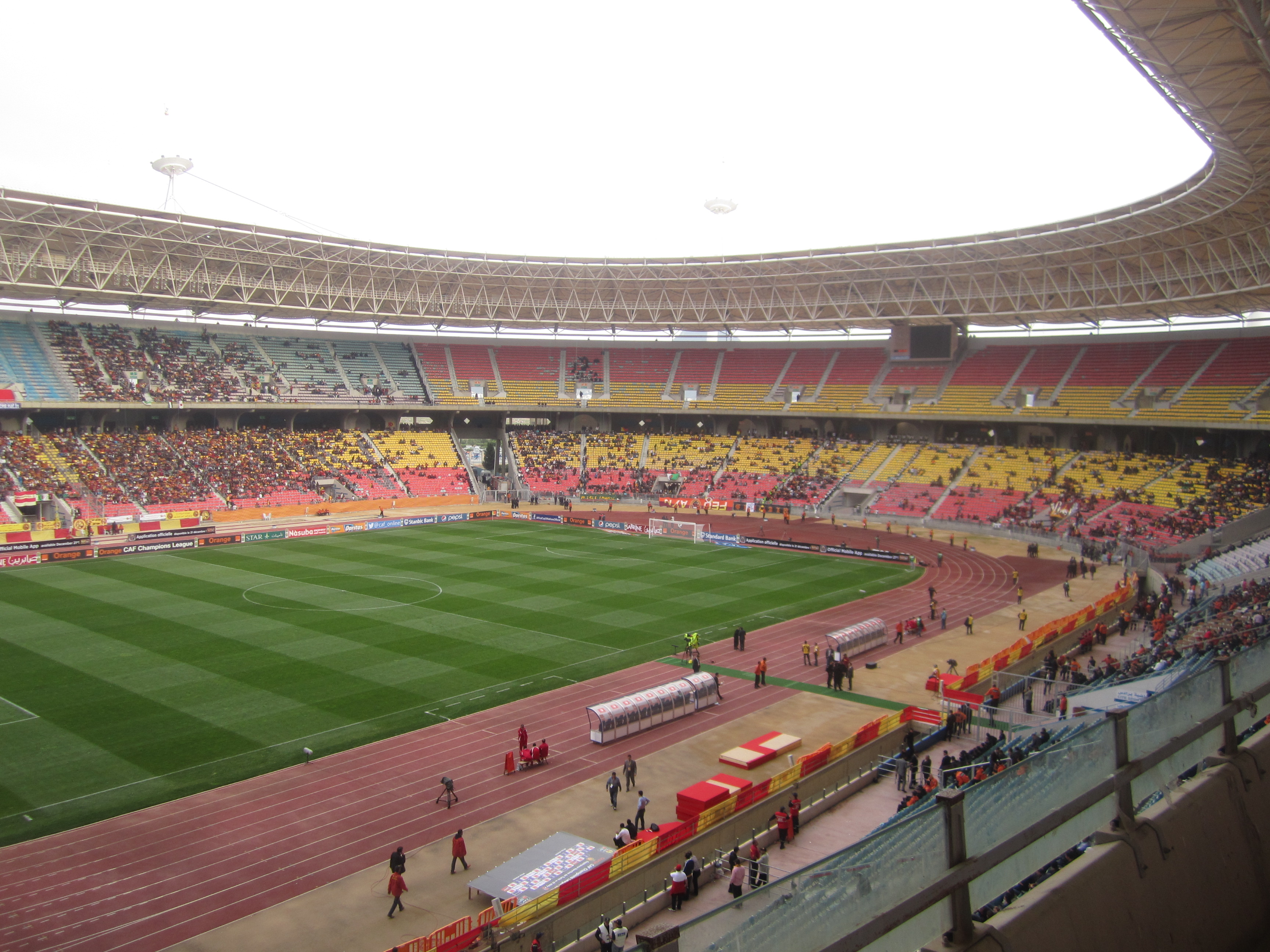
Hammadi Agrebi Stadium during the final of the 2012 CAF Champions League.

==== Stade El Menzah ====
Stade El Menzah
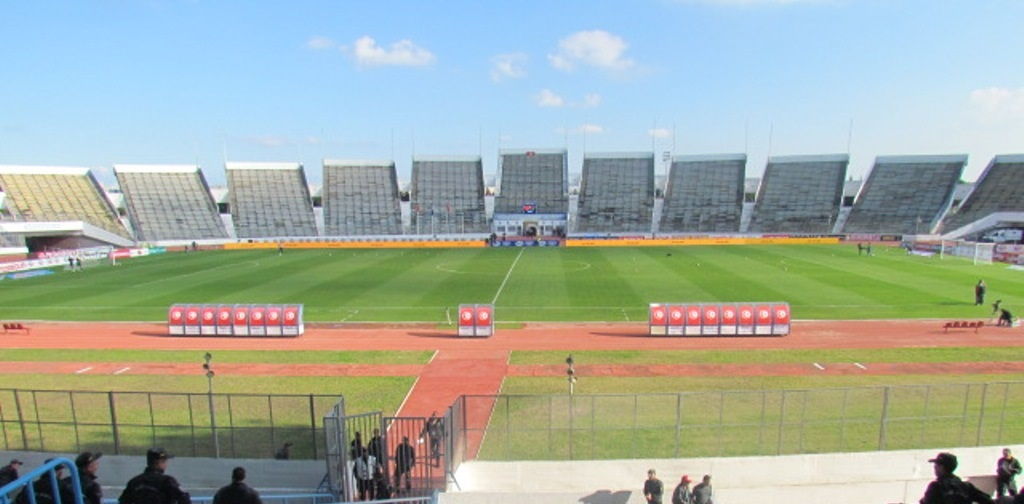
- Location: Tunis, Tunisia
- Capacity: 45,000
- Surface: Grass

Construction
- Opened: 1967

Stade El Menzah is a multi-purpose stadium located in the northern part of Tunis, Tunisia. Built to host the 1967 Mediterranean Games, it is an integral part of the country's major sports complex. Originally home to the Tunisia national football team until the opening of Hammadi Agrebi Stadium in 2001, the stadium also hosted matches for the country's top football teams, including Espérance Sportive de Tunis, Club Africain, and Stade Tunisien.

In 1994, the stadium underwent major renovations for the 1994 African Cup of Nations, bringing its capacity to 45,000. It is also home to a VIP section that accommodates up to 300 people.

== Individual awards ==
=== Players awards ===
==== African Footballer of the Year ====
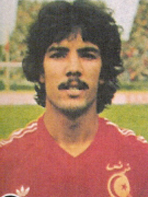
Tarak Dhiab in 1978.

Year	Player
1977	(Tunisia) Tarak Dhiab

==== Tunisian Athlete of the Year Award ====
Year	Player
1977	(Tunisia) Tarak Dhiab
1989	(Tunisia) Khaled Ben Yahia
2000	(Tunisia) Chokri El Ouaer

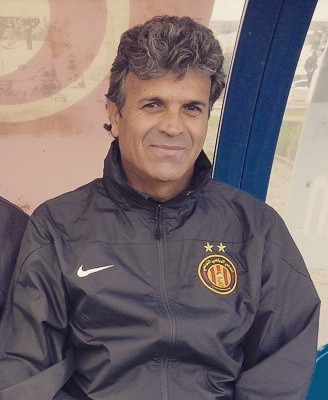
Khaled Ben Yahia

==== Tunisian Golden Boot ====
Year	Player
1981	(Tunisia) Khaled Ben Yahia
1982	(Tunisia) Tarak Dhiab
1987	(Tunisia) Khaled Ben Yahia

- Source: Tunisian Football Federation

==== Tunisian Golden Ball ====
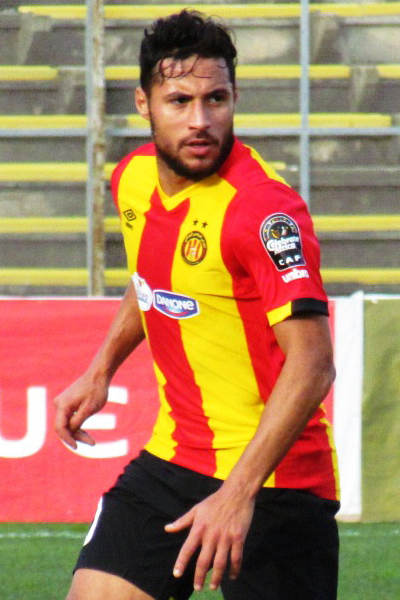
Youcef Belaïli

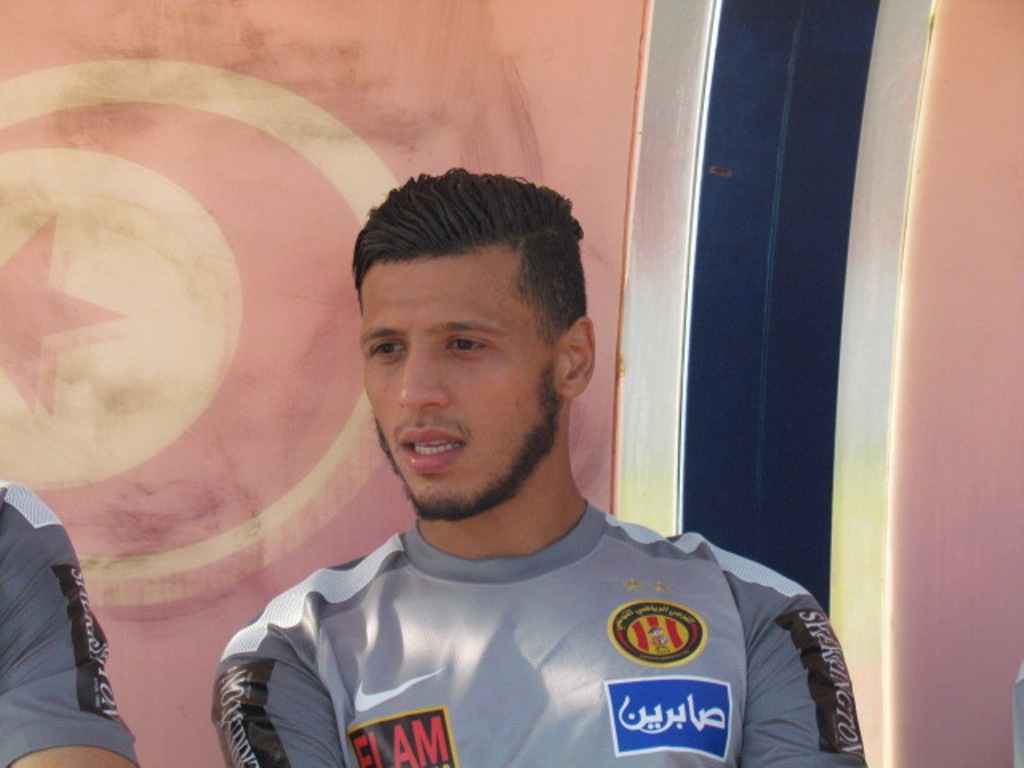
Anice Badri

Year	Player
2009	(Tunisia) Oussama Darragi
2012	(Tunisia) Moez Ben Cherifia
2013	(Tunisia) Youssef Msakni

==== African Inter-Club Player of the Year ====
Year	Player
2011	(Tunisia) Oussama Darragi
2019	(Algeria) Youcef Belaïli

==== Arab Golden Ball ====
Year	Player
2012	(Tunisia) Oussama Darragi

==== Best Maghreb Player Award ====
Year	Player
2018	(Tunisia) Anice Badri

== Rival clubs ==
Rival clubs of Espérance Sportive de Tunis
Country	Club	Rivalry
Tunisia	Club Africain	Derby
Tunisia	Étoile du Sahel	Classico
Tunisia	Club Sfaxien	Rivalry
Tunisia	US Monastir	Rivalry
Egypt	Al Ahly	Rivalry
Egypt	Zamalek	Rivalry
Morocco	Wydad AC	Rivalry
Algeria	MC Alger	Rivalry
DR Congo	TP Mazembe	Rivalry

=== Tunis Derby ===
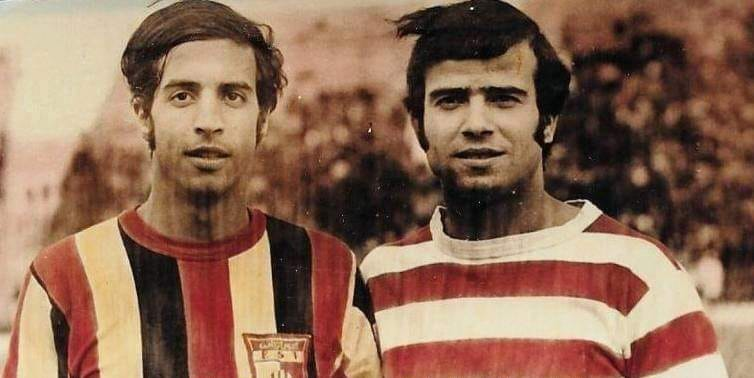
Abdelmajid Ben M'rad (EST) and Tahar Chaïbi (CA).

In Tunisian football, the Tunis derby is the local derby between the two major clubs in the city of Tunis, Tunisia – Club Africain and Espérance de Tunis. The derby is played in Tunis in the Hammadi Agrebi stadium due to its larger capacity of 65,000 seats. Before the construction of this stadium, the derby used to be played in the 45,000 seat-capacity Stade El Menzah.

==== Derby statistics ====
- As of 10 May 2026

Competition	Matches	Wins		Draws	Goals	
Competition	Matches	Espérance de Tunis	Club Africain	Draws	Espérance de Tunis	Club Africain
Before Independence	37	17	8	10	50	43
Ligue 1	146	59	34	53	177	131
Tunisian Cup	22	9	9	4	22	21
Tunisian Super Cup	2	0	2	0	0	2
Tunisian League Cup	2	2	0	0	4	1
Total	209	87	53	67	253	198

=== Tunisian Classico ===
The Tunisian Classico refers to the football rivalry between Espérance de Tunis and Étoile du Sahel, based in Tunis and Sousse, Tunisia. It's considered one of the most important rivalries in Tunisian football, with the two teams holding a combined 102 titles, including 17 continental championships. Their first match was in 1944–45, ending in a 0–0 draw. They have faced each other regularly, except during the 1961–62 season when Étoile du Sahel was disbanded. The teams have met five times in the Tunisian Cup, with Espérance winning the first in 1957. The rivalry extended to the continental level in the 2005 CAF Champions League, with both encounters ending in a draw. They've finished as champions and runners-up in the same season 17 times, including five consecutive seasons between 1999 and 2004.

==== Classico statistics ====
- As of 23 August 2026

Tournament	Games Played	EST Victory	Draw	ESS Victory
Before 1956	16	7	4	5
Ligue Professionnelle 1	141	58	45	38
Tunisian Cup	26	12	3	11
Tunisian Super Cup	1	0	1	0
Champions League	10	7	3	0
Confederation Cup	6	0	1	5
TOTAL	200	84	57	59

== Honours ==
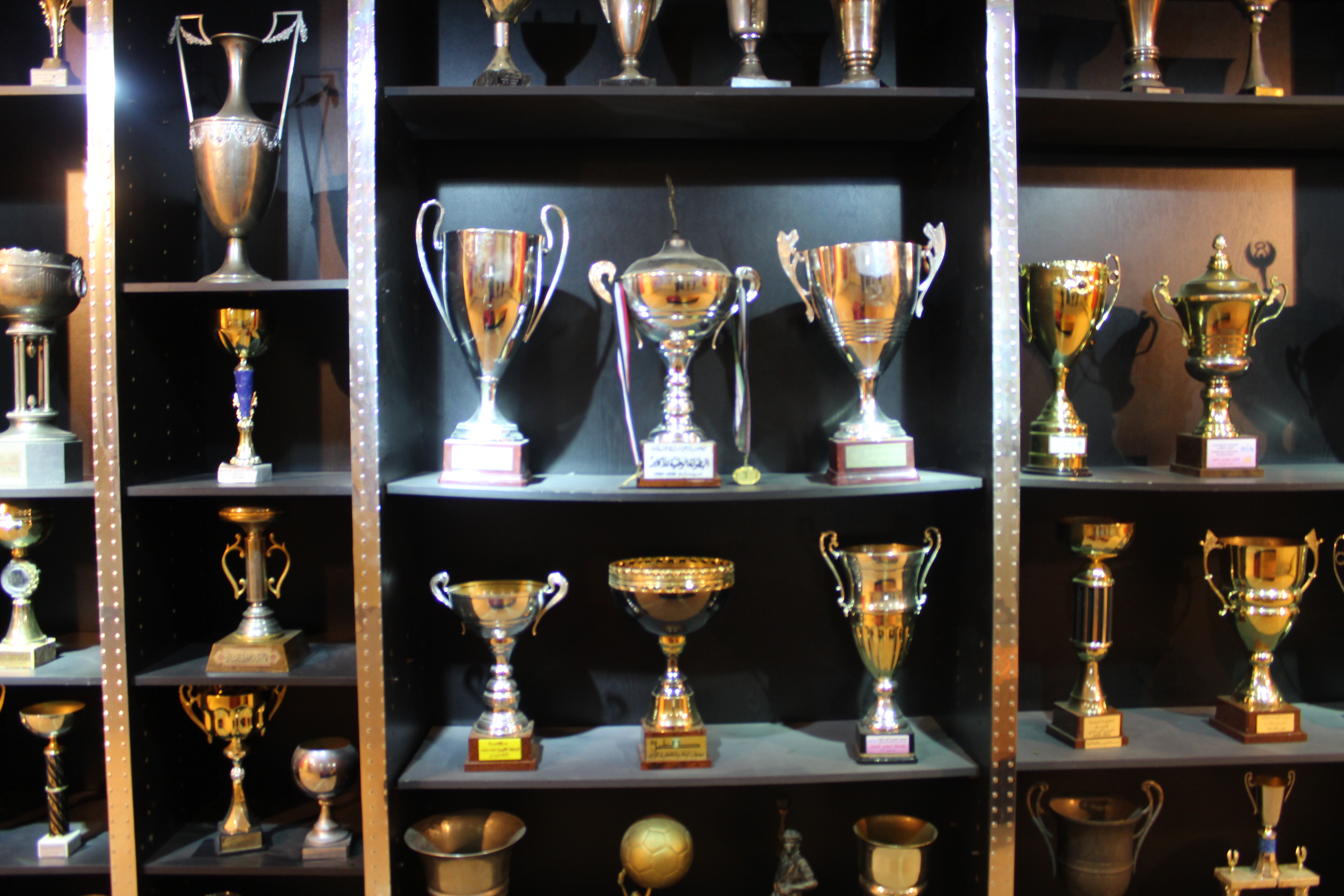

Espérance Sportive de Tunis is one of the most successful football clubs in Tunisia and Africa. The club has a rich history, with numerous Tunisian Ligue Professionnelle 1 titles, Tunisian Cup, and Tunisian Super Cup. Espérance is especially renowned for its success in African competitions, particularly in the CAF Champions League, which they have won multiple times. In 1994, they earned the nickname The Beast of Africa after winning every major African trophy in a single season. Despite having strong competition, including clubs like Al Ahly, Espérance has consistently remained a top contender in African football with a remarkable legacy. The club has also participated in the prestigious FIFA Club World Cup on three occasions: in 2011, 2018, and 2019. These appearances reflect Espérance's strong international presence and their continued prominence in global football.

Type	Competition	Titles	Winning Seasons
Domestic	Tunisian Ligue Professionnelle 1	34	1941–42, 1958–59, 1959–60, 1969–70, 1974–75, 1975–76, 1981–82, 1984–85, 1987–88, 1988–89, 1990–91, 1992–93, 1993–94, 1997–98, 1998–99, 1999–00, 2000–01, 2001–02, 2002–03, 2003–04, 2005–06, 2008–09, 2009–10, 2010–11, 2011–12, 2013–14, 2016–17, 2017–18, 2018–19, 2019–20, 2020–21, 2021–22, 2023–24, 2024–25
Domestic	Tunisian Cup	17	1938–39, 1956–57, 1963–64, 1978–79, 1979–80, 1985–86, 1988–89, 1990–91, 1996–97, 1998–99, 2005–06, 2006–07, 2007–08, 2010–11, 2015–16, 2024–25, 2025–26
Domestic	Tunisian Super Cup	8	1960, 1993, 2001, 2018, 2019, 2021, 2023–24, 2024–25
Continental	CAF Champions League	4	1994, 2011, 2018, 2019
Continental	African Cup Winners' Cup	1	1998
Continental	CAF Cup	1	1997
Continental	CAF Super Cup	1	1995
Regional	Arab Club Champions Cup	3^{S}	1993, 2008–09, 2017
Regional	Arab Super Cup	1	1996
Regional	North African Cup Winners Cup	1	2008
Intercontinental	Afro-Asian Club Championship	1	1995

- record
- ^{S} shared record

=== Club prizes ===
- African Inter-Club Team of the Year: 2011
- FIFA Fair Play Award: 2019

== International participations ==
=== Club world ranking ===
Footballdatabase club's points 14 May 2026.

Pos.	Team	Points
124	(Germany) Eintracht Frankfurt	1609
125	(Greece) Pafos FC	1606
126	(Tunisia) Espérance de Tunis	1606
127	(Ukraine) FC Dynamo Kyiv	1605
128	(Mexico) Tigres UANL	1604

=== CAF club rankings ===
Footballdatabase club's points 14 May 2026.

Pos.	Team	Points
2	(Egypt) Pyramids FC	1665
3	(Egypt) Al Ahly SC	1634
4	(Tunisia) Espérance de Tunis	1606
5	(Morocco) FAR Rabat	1595
6	(South Africa) Orlando Pirates	1568

=== National club rankings ===
Footballdatabase club's points 14 May 2026 .

Pos.	Team	Points
1	(Tunisia) Espérance de Tunis	1606
2	(Tunisia) Club Africain	1509
3	(Tunisia) CS Sfaxien	1501
4	(Tunisia) US Monastir	1484
5	(Tunisia) Étoile Sportive du Sahel	1455

=== FIFA Club World Cup ===
2025 FIFA Club World Cup logo

Participation Record in the FIFA Club World Cup
Year	Position	Last opponent
2011	Sixth place	(Mexico) Monterrey
2018	Fifth place	(Mexico) Guadalajara
2019	Fifth place	(Qatar) Al-Sadd
2025	21st place	(England) Chelsea F.C.

=== African Cup of Champions Clubs and CAF Champions League ===
Participation Record in the African Cup of Champions Clubs and CAF Champions League
Year	Final position / round	Last opponent
1971	Second round	(Egypt) Ismaily
1986	Quarter-finals	(Ivory Coast) Africa Sports
1989	Second round	(Algeria) MC Oran
1990	Quarter-finals	(Nigeria) Iwuanyanwu Nationale
1994	Winners	(Egypt) Zamalek
1995	Quarter-finals	(Egypt) Ismaily
1999	Runners–up	(Morocco) Raja Casablanca
2000	Runners–up	(Ghana) Hearts of Oak
2001	Semi-finals	(Egypt) Al Ahly
2002	Group stage	(Egypt) Zamalek
2002	Group stage	(Ivory Coast) ASEC Mimosas
2002	Group stage	(Mozambique) Costa do Sol
2003	Semi-finals	(Egypt) Ismaily
2004	Semi-finals	(Nigeria) Enyimba
2005	Group stage	(Tunisia) Étoile du Sahel
2005	Group stage	(Egypt) Zamalek
2005	Group stage	(Ivory Coast) ASEC Mimosas
2007	Group stage	(Egypt) Al Ahly
2007	Group stage	(Sudan) Al Hilal
2007	Group stage	(Ivory Coast) ASEC Mimosas
2010	Runners-up	(Democratic Republic of the Congo) TP Mazembe
2011	Winners	(Morocco) Wydad AC
2012	Runners-up	(Egypt) Al Ahly
2013	Semi-finals	(South Africa) Orlando Pirates
2014	Group stage	(Tunisia) Club Sfaxien
2014	Group stage	(Algeria) ES Sétif
2014	Group stage	(Libya) Al Ahly Benghazi
2015	Second round	(Sudan) Al Merrikh
2017	Quarter-finals	(Egypt) Al Ahly
2018	Winners	(Egypt) Al Ahly
2019	Winners	(Morocco) Wydad AC
2020	Quarter-finals	(Egypt) Zamalek
2021	Semi-finals	(Egypt) Al Ahly
2022	Quarter-finals	(Algeria) ES Sétif
2023	Semi-finals	(Egypt) Al Ahly
2024	Runners-up	(Egypt) Al Ahly
2025	Quarter-finals	(South Africa) Mamelodi Sundowns
2026	Semi-finals	(South Africa) Mamelodi Sundowns

=== CAF Confederation Cup ===
Participation Record in the CAF Confederation Cup
Year	Position	Last opponent
2006	Group stage	(Tunisia) Étoile du Sahel
2006	Group stage	(Democratic Republic of the Congo) Saint-Éloi Lupopo
2006	Group stage	(Equatorial Guinea) Renacimiento
2008	Play-off round	(Tunisia) Étoile du Sahel
2015	Group stage	(Egypt) Al Ahly
2015	Group stage	(Tunisia) Étoile du Sahel
2015	Group stage	(Mali) Stade Malien
2016	Play-off round	(Algeria) MO Béjaïa

=== CAF Cup ===
Participation Record in the CAF Cup
Year	Position	Last opponent
1997	Winners	(Angola) Petro de Luanda

=== African Cup Winners' Cup ===
Participation Record in the African Cup Winners' Cup
Year	Position	Last opponent
1980	Second round	(Republic of Upper Volta) Kadiogo
1981	First round	(Niger) Zoundourma
1987	Runners–up	(Kenya) Gor Mahia
1998	Winners	(Angola) 1º de Agosto

=== CAF Super Cup ===
Participation Record in the CAF Super Cup
Year	Position	Last opponent
1995	Winners	(Zaire) Motema Pembe
1999	Runners–up	(Ivory Coast) ASEC Mimosas
2012	Runners–up	(Morocco) Maghreb de Fès
2019	Runners–up	(Morocco) Raja Casablanca
2020	Runners–up	(Egypt) Zamalek

=== Afro-Asian Club Championship ===
Participation Record in the Afro-Asian Club Championship
Year	Position	Last opponent
1995	Winners	(Thailand) Thai Farmers Bank

== Players ==
=== Current squad ===
Note: Flags indicate national team as defined under FIFA eligibility rules; some limited exceptions apply. Players may hold more than one non-FIFA nationality.

No.	Pos.	Nation	Player
1	GK	TUN	Amenallah Memmiche
2	DF	TUN	Mohamed Ben Ali (4th captain)
3	DF	TUN	Elies Araar
4	DF	TUN	Marouane Sahraoui
6	DF	TUN	Hamza Jelassi (3rd captain)
7	FW	FRA	Imad Faraj
8	MF	TUN	Hamza Rafia (vice-captain)
9	FW	FRA	Florian Danho
10	FW	BRA	Lucas Ribeiro
11	FW	ALG	Youcef Belaïli (captain)
12	DF	TUN	Nidhal Laifi
13	DF	TUN	Mohamed Dräger
14	MF	TUN	Khairi Meddaoui
15	MF	TUN	Khalil Guenichi
16	MF	PER	Jesús Castillo

No.	Pos.	Nation	Player
17	MF	TUN	Haytham Dhaou
18	MF	TUN	Moez Hadj Ali
19	FW	TUN	Achref Jabri
20	MF	TUN	Mohamed Belhadj Mahmoud
21	MF	CIV	Abdramane Konaté
22	GK	TUN	Montasser Essid
23	FW	CIV	Namory Keita
24	FW	TUN	Youssef Becha
25	DF	TUN	Raed Chikhaoui
27	FW	TUN	Hazem Mastouri
28	DF	ALG	Adem Alilet
29	FW	CMR	Maël Fernandez
31	MF	TUN	Chiheb Jebali
32	GK	TUN	Bechir Ben Saïd
36	MF	TUN	Arkem Taboubi

=== Reserve team ===
Note: Flags indicate national team as defined under FIFA eligibility rules; some limited exceptions apply. Players may hold more than one non-FIFA nationality.

No.	Pos.	Nation	Player
—	DF	TUN	Mohamed Aloui
—	MF	TUN	Wajdi Issaoui

No.	Pos.	Nation	Player
—	FW	TUN	Amenallah Frikhi

=== Out on loan ===
Note: Flags indicate national team as defined under FIFA eligibility rules; some limited exceptions apply. Players may hold more than one non-FIFA nationality.

No.	Pos.	Nation	Player
—	GK	TUN	Mokhtar Ifaoui (at US Ben Guerdane until 30 June 2027)
—	DF	TUN	Aziz Koudhai (at CS Hammam-Lif until 30 June 2027)

No.	Pos.	Nation	Player
—	FW	TUN	Zinedine Kada (at Al Tahaddy until 30 June 2027)

=== Other players under contract ===
Note: Flags indicate national team as defined under FIFA eligibility rules; some limited exceptions apply. Players may hold more than one non-FIFA nationality.

No.	Pos.	Nation	Player
—	DF	SWE	Elyas Bouzaiene
—	DF	TUN	Ala Derbali
—	DF	TUN	Koussay Smiri

No.	Pos.	Nation	Player
—	MF	TUN	Aziz Fellah
—	FW	TUN	Salmen Trabelsi

=== Retired numbers ===
Note: Flags indicate national team as defined under FIFA eligibility rules; some limited exceptions apply. Players may hold more than one non-FIFA nationality.

No.	Pos.	Nation	Player
5	DF	TUN	Hédi Berkhissa (1991–97 – posthumous honour)

== Personnel ==
=== Coaching staff ===
Position	Name
Manager	(Spain) Pablo Franco
Assistant manager	(Spain) Aitor van den Brule
Assistant manager	(Tunisia) Mohamed Amine Naffati
Goalkeeping coach	(Tunisia) Mabrouk Akremi
Fitness coach	(Tunisia) Slim Labreg
Fitness coach	(Tunisia) Hassen Ksouri

=== Management ===
Position	Name
President	(Tunisia) Hamdi Meddeb
Honorary President	(Tunisia) Slim Chiboub
Vice President (football)	(Tunisia) Chokri El Ouaer
Financial Director	(Tunisia) Rafik Mrabet
Law Director	(Tunisia) Farouk Kattou
President of Football Operations	(Tunisia) Riadh Bennour
Spokesman	(Tunisia) Walid Guerfala

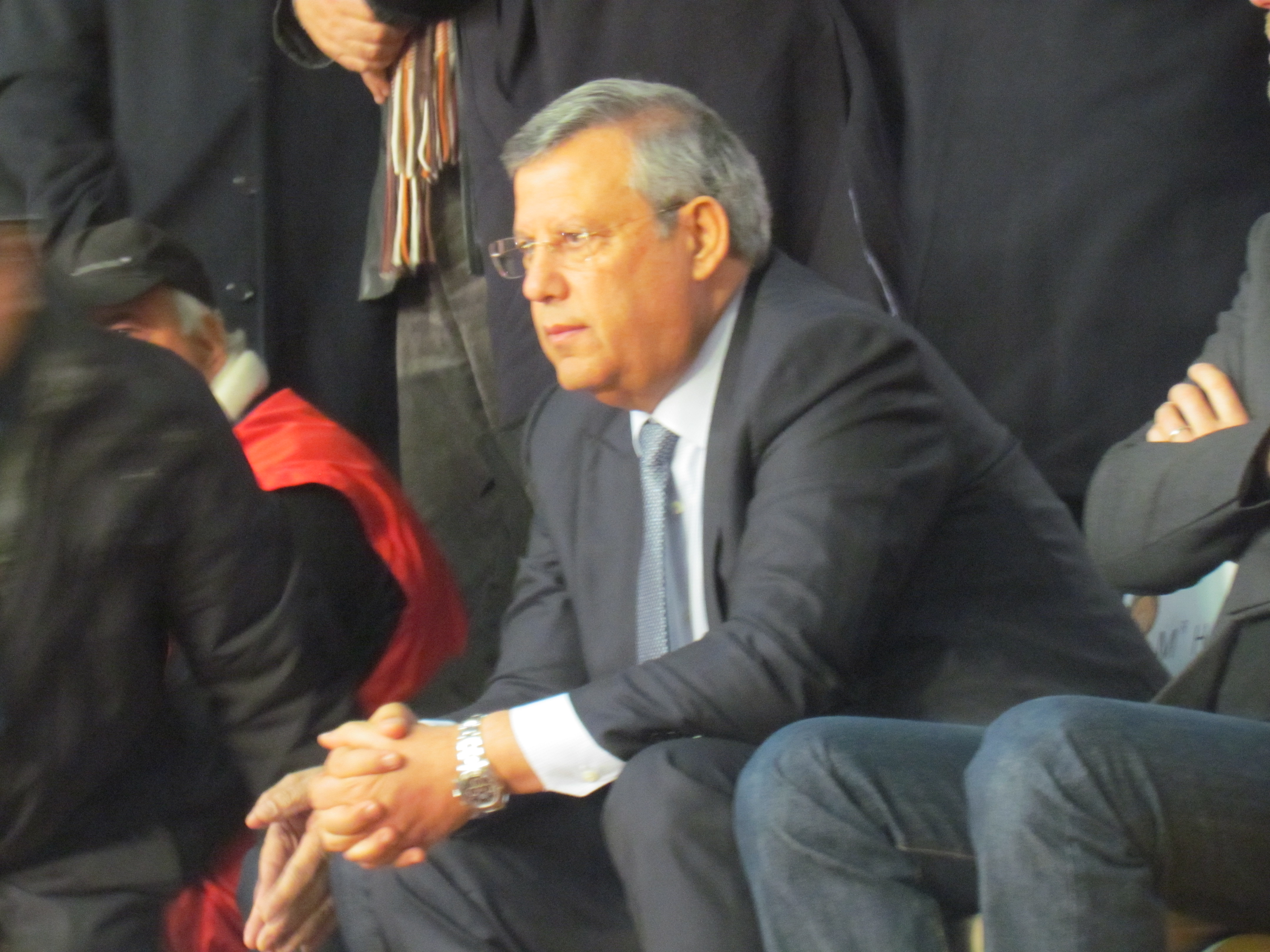
Tunisian businessman Hamdi Meddeb is the current president of the club.

== Twinning ==
- (Palestine) Taraji Wadi Al-Nes
- (Saudi Arabia) Al-Taraji Club
- (Tunisia) Espérance Sportive de Zarzis
