= 2005 CAF Champions League group stage =

- Dates: 26 June – 11 September 2005

Tournament statistics
- Matches played: 24
- Goals scored: 45 (1.88 per match)

The group stage of the 2005 CAF Champions League was played from 26 June to 11 September 2005. A total of eight teams competed in the group stage, the group winners and runners-up advance to the Knockout stage playing semifinal rounds before the final.

== Format ==
In the group stage, each group was played on a home-and-away round-robin basis. The winners and the runners-up of each group advanced to the Knockout stage.

== Groups ==
Key to colours in group tables
Group winners and runners-up advance to the Knockout stage

=== Group A ===
Pos	Team	Pld	W	D	L	GF	GA	GD	Pts	Qualification
1	(Egypt) Al Ahly	6	4	2	0	7	2	+5	14	Advance to knockout stage
2	(Morocco) Raja Casablanca	6	2	2	2	6	5	+1	8	Advance to knockout stage
3	(Nigeria) Enyimba	6	2	1	3	6	5	+1	7	
4	(South Africa) Ajax Cape Town	6	0	3	3	2	9	−7	3	

Home	Score	Away
Al Ahly	1–0	Raja Casablanca
Ajax Cape Town	1–1	Enyimba
Raja Casablanca	1–1	Ajax Cape Town
Enyimba	0–1	Al Ahly
Al Ahly	2–0	Ajax Cape Town
Raja Casablanca	1–0	Enyimba
Ajax Cape Town	0–0	Al Ahly
Enyimba	2–0	Raja Casablanca
Raja Casablanca	1–1	Al Ahly
Enyimba	2–0	Ajax Cape Town
Ajax Cape Town	0–3	Raja Casablanca
Al Ahly	2–1	Enyimba

=== Group B ===
Pos	Team	Pld	W	D	L	GF	GA	GD	Pts	Qualification
1	(Tunisia) Étoile du Sahel	6	2	4	0	8	6	+2	10	Advance to knockout stage
2	(Egypt) Zamalek	6	2	3	1	8	7	+1	9	Advance to knockout stage
3	(Ivory Coast) ASEC Mimosas	6	1	3	2	5	6	−1	6	
4	(Tunisia) Espérance de Tunis	6	0	4	2	3	5	−2	4	

Home	Score	Away
ASEC Mimosas	1–1	Zamalek
Étoile du Sahel	0–0	Espérance de Tunis
Zamalek	1–1	Étoile du Sahel
Espérance de Tunis	0–0	ASEC Mimosas
ASEC Mimosas	1–1	Étoile du Sahel
Zamalek	1–1	Espérance de Tunis
Étoile du Sahel	2–1	ASEC Mimosas
Espérance de Tunis	1–2	Zamalek
Zamalek	2–1	ASEC Mimosas
Espérance de Tunis	1–1	Étoile du Sahel
Étoile du Sahel	2–1	Zamalek
ASEC Mimosas	1–0	Espérance de Tunis
