= 2006 CAF Confederation Cup group stage =

The group stage of the 2006 CAF Confederation Cup was played from 12 August to 28 October 2006. A total of eight teams competed in the group stage.

== Format ==
In the group stage, each group was played on a home-and-away round-robin basis. The winners of each group advanced directly to the final.

Key to colours in group tables
Group winners advance to the final

== Groups ==
=== Group A ===
Team	Pts	Pld	W	D	L	GF	GA	GD	
(Morocco) FAR Rabat	13	6	4	1	1	10	5	5	Final
(Morocco) Olympique Khouribga	10	6	3	1	2	6	5	1	
(Angola) Petro Atlético	8	6	2	2	2	10	7	3	
(Angola) GD Interclube	3	6	1	0	5	3	12	-9	

Home	Score	Away
GD Interclube (Angola)	1 - 3	(Angola) Petro Atlético
FAR Rabat (Morocco)	3 - 1	(Morocco) Olympique Khouribga
Olympique Khouribga (Morocco)	1 - 0	(Angola) GD Interclube
Petro Atlético (Angola)	1 - 1	(Morocco) FAR Rabat
FAR Rabat (Morocco)	2 - 0	(Angola) GD Interclube
Olympique Khouribga (Morocco)	1 - 0	(Angola) Petro Atlético
GD Interclube (Angola)	0 - 2	(Morocco) FAR Rabat
Petro Atlético (Angola)	1 - 1	(Morocco) Olympique Khouribga
Olympique Khouribga (Morocco)	2 - 0	(Morocco) FAR Rabat
Petro Atlético (Angola)	4 - 1	(Angola) GD Interclube
GD Interclube (Angola)	1 - 0	(Morocco) Olympique Khouribga
FAR Rabat (Morocco)	2 - 1	(Angola) Petro Atlético

=== Group B ===
Team	Pts	Pld	W	D	L	GF	GA	GD	
(Tunisia) Étoile Sahel	18	6	6	0	0	15	3	12	Final
(Tunisia) Espérance	8	6	2	2	2	10	7	3	
(Democratic Republic of the Congo) FC Saint Eloi Lupopo	4	6	1	1	4	8	12	-4	
(Equatorial Guinea) Renacimiento FC	4	6	1	1	4	6	17	-11	

Home	Score	Away
Étoile Sahel (Tunisia)	1 - 0	(Tunisia) Espérance
FC Saint Eloi Lupopo (Democratic Republic of the Congo)	5 - 1	(Equatorial Guinea) Renacimiento FC
Espérance (Tunisia)	1 - 0	(Democratic Republic of the Congo) FC Saint Eloi Lupopo
Renacimiento FC (Equatorial Guinea)	0 - 2	(Tunisia) Étoile Sahel
Étoile Sahel (Tunisia)	4 - 1	(Democratic Republic of the Congo) FC Saint Eloi Lupopo
Espérance (Tunisia)	5 - 0	(Equatorial Guinea) Renacimiento FC
FC Saint Eloi Lupopo (Democratic Republic of the Congo)	0 - 1	(Tunisia) Étoile Sahel
Renacimiento FC (Equatorial Guinea)	1 - 1	(Tunisia) Espérance
Espérance (Tunisia)	1 - 3	(Tunisia) Étoile Sahel
Renacimiento FC (Equatorial Guinea)	3 - 0	(Democratic Republic of the Congo) FC Saint Eloi Lupopo
FC Saint Eloi Lupopo (Democratic Republic of the Congo)	2 - 2	(Tunisia) Espérance
Étoile Sahel (Tunisia)	4 - 1	(Equatorial Guinea) Renacimiento FC
