= Tunisian Ligue Professionnelle 1 =

Association football league in Tunisia

- Organising body: Tunisian Football Federation; National Professional Football League
- Founded: 9 June 1907; 119 years ago
- Country: Tunisia
- Confederation: CAF
- Number of clubs: 16
- Level on pyramid: 1
- Relegation to: Ligue Professionnelle 2
- Domestic cup(s): Tunisian Cup; Tunisian Super Cup
- International cup(s): CAF Champions League; CAF Confederation Cup
- Current champions: Club Africain (14th title) (2025–26)
- Most championships: Espérance de Tunis (34 titles)
- Most appearances: Tarak Dhiab (353)
- Top scorer: Ezzedine Chakroun (116)
- Broadcasters: El Watania 1 El Watania 2 Al-Kass Sports; Diwan Sport
- Website: Official Website
- Current: 2026–27 Tunisian Ligue Professionnelle 1

The Tunisian Ligue Professionnelle 1, formerly known as the Tunisian National Championship (1955–1994), is the highest-level football competition in Tunisia and is organised by the Tunisian Football Federation (FTF) and the National Professional Football League (LNFP). The history of the competition is somewhat complex, with the first edition being held in 1907 during the French protectorate in Tunisia, organised by the Union of French Athletic Sports Societies (USFSA), it was played in a knockout format and the first official match taking place on 9 June 1907. In 1921, the Tunisian Football Association League (LTFA) was founded, it is the Tunisian branch of the French Football Federation, which remained in operation until independence in 1956.

On 29 March 1957, the Tunisian Football Federation was founded, the governing body for football in Tunisia. The Tunisian National Championship became professional in the 1994–95 season following the establishment of the National Professional Football League, and the competition took its current name, making it the first professional league in Africa and the Arab world. The top two teams in the final standings qualify for the CAF Champions League, and the third-place team qualifies for the CAF Confederation Cup. In 2019, the Tunisian Ligue Professionnelle 1 ranked first in the Arab world and Africa, and fifteenth globally, according to the IFFHS rankings.

Espérance Sportive de Tunis has won 34 titles. Coach Faouzi Benzarti has won the championship on eleven occasions with Espérance de Tunis (5), Étoile du Sahel (4) and Club Africain (2), while former player Khalil Chemmam has won the championship on twelve occasions all with Espérance de Tunis.

== History ==
=== Pre-independence (1904–1956) ===
Football was born in Tunisia in 1904 with the unofficial creation of the Racing Club de Tunis, formalized in 1905 but which had to wait for the creation of other clubs in Tunis and Bizerte to participate in an official competition. Then the government is obliged to take an active interest in it. It distributed a few grants, though very small. A committee of the Union des Sociétés Françaises de Sports Athlétiques, responsible for the management of all sports in Tunisia, was then created. In 1910, a first series championship was organized with the participation of the Racing Club, Sporting Club de Tunis, Lycée Carnot de Tunis, the Colonial School of Agriculture, the Football Club of Tunis and the Red Star Club de l'Ariana, and a second series made up of the second teams of Racing Club de Tunis, Sporting and Gallia Club. The national title is awarded after a final between Racing and Stade maritime de Bizerte (champion of the Mediterranean squadrons) with a score of 2–0.

There are then very few Tunisian player. But, surprisingly, La Dépêche tunisienne published on 12 June 1910 the list of players of the Khereddine Club team, called to play against the Ariana Club and who are all Tunisians. It is the first fully Tunisian team but which we have not heard from later and which precedes the Comète Club team, created in 1914 but which did not survive the First World War. The Racing Club won the championship in 1909–10, 1910–11 and 1913–14, then in 1919–20 and 1920–21, while Sporting de Ferryville was crowned in 1911–12 and 1912–13. The championship became official with the creation of the Tunisian Football Association League in 1921 was established, which is the Tunisian branch of the French Football Federation. Until 1939, the title of champion was awarded following play-offs between regional champions. From 1946 to 1947, a championship of "excellence" (national division) is created and is contested at the national level. In 1944–45, 1945–46 and 1952–53, the championship was not contested and replaced by a criterium (a sort of group tournament where participation was not compulsory). These years saw the creation of the Stade Tunisien in 1948.

=== Post-independence (1956–present) ===
Following Tunisia's independence on 20 March 1956, a profound reorganization of national football took place. The main clubs associated with French colonialism, such as Racing Club de Tunis, Sporting Club de Tunis, Stade gaulois, and Avant-garde, were dissolved. On 29 March 1957, the Tunisian Football Federation was founded, which has administered Tunisian football ever since, and the championship began to be played under its auspices. The first season after independence saw CS Hammam-Lif crowned champion, followed by Étoile Sportive du Sahel, Club Africain, and Espérance Sportive de Tunis. In the 1956–57 season, Stade Tunisien won its first title, while in 1957–58, Étoile du Sahel secured its second championship. Espérance won its first post-independence titles in the 1958–59 and 1959–60 seasons, quickly establishing itself as one of the dominant teams. In 1960, the Tunisian Super Cup was created. Stade Tunisien continued its winning streak, becoming champions in 1960–61 and 1961–62, and the first team to achieve the double (league and Tunisian Cup) after independence. However, a dramatic event marked this period: on 20 March 1961, President Habib Bourguiba ordered the dissolution of Étoile Sportive du Sahel due to riots instigated by its fans. After a year's absence, the club returned triumphantly in the 1962–63 season, winning both the league and the cup, thus achieving its second double of the independent era.

During the 1960s, Club Africain won its first post-independence titles in 1963–64 and 1966–67. Stade Tunisien added another championship in 1964–65, consolidating its dominance in this decade with four titles. Étoile du Sahel was crowned champion again in 1965–66, while Sfax Railway Sport achieved its first post-independence title in 1967–68, following its victories in 1933–34 and 1952–53. The 1968–69 season marked the first championship for CS Sfaxien, securing the second consecutive title for the city of Sfax. The 1970s began with Espérance's fourth title in 1969–70. CS Sfaxien won its second post-independence championship in 1970–71, while Étoile du Sahel won in 1971–72. Club Africain secured two consecutive titles in 1972–73 and 1973–74, and Espérance added three more championships in 1974–75, 1975–76, and 1981–82. A notable event was the 1976–77 coronation of JS Kairouan, breaking the dominance of the larger clubs. CS Sfaxien won in 1977–78, a season in which the Tunisian Cup could not be completed due to the national team's participation in the 1978 FIFA World Cup. Club Africain closed out the decade with two consecutive titles in 1978–79 and 1979–80 seasons.

The 1980s were characterized by the alternating title wins of the four major Tunisian football clubs. CS Sfaxien won his fourth and fifth title in 1980–81 and 1982–83, while Espérance de Tunis dominated with four titles in 1981–82, 1984–85, 1987–88, and 1988–89, achieving their tenth championship. Étoile Sportive du Sahel secured three consecutive or nearly consecutive titles in 1985–86 and 1986–87, reaching their seventh championship. CA Bizertin won their fourth title in 1983–84, demonstrating that other teams could also compete for the title. Club Africain closed out the decade with their ninth championship in 1989–90.

== Media coverage ==
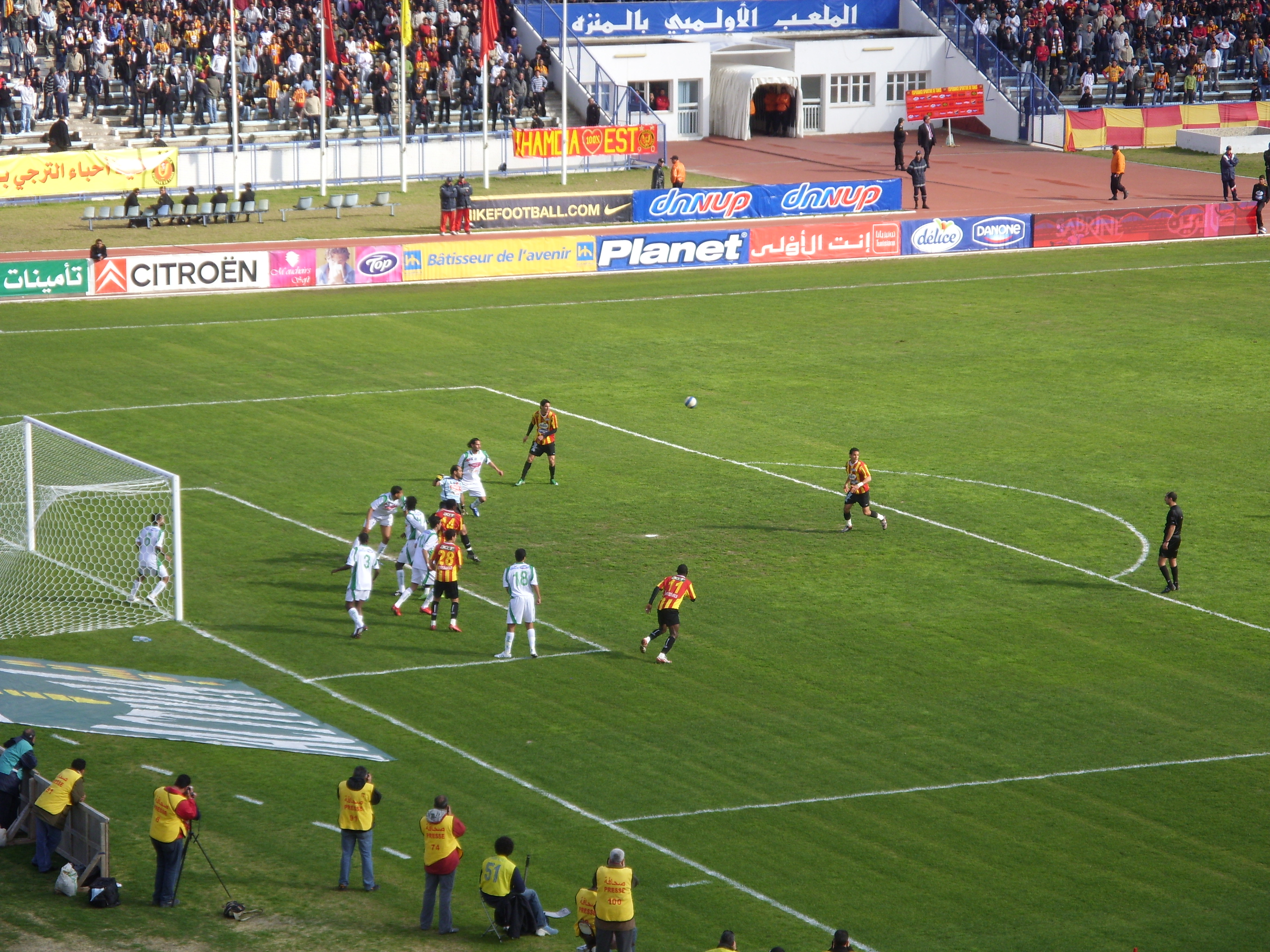
Match between Espérance de Tunis and CS Hammam-Lif during the 2008–09 season.

The broadcasting rights for the Tunisian Ligue Professionnelle 1 are held by several television and digital media operators. In Tunisia, the public broadcaster Tunisian Television provides traditional television coverage of the championship through its channels El Watania 1 and El Watania 2. Digital coverage is also provided by Diwan Sport, which obtained the digital broadcasting rights to the league for three seasons, including the rights to stream championship matches online. Internationally, the Qatari broadcaster Al Kass Sports Channels, through its digital platform Shoof, holds broadcasting rights for a selection of approximately 30 matches per season, including coverage for audiences in the Gulf region. The combined value of the main broadcasting rights is estimated at approximately 8.83 million Tunisian dinars per season.

=== Broadcasting rights ===
Broadcasting rights for the Tunisian Ligue Professionnelle 1
Country / Region	Broadcaster / Platform	Type of coverage / Matches
Tunisia	El Watania 1 / El Watania 2	National television broadcasts
Tunisia	Diwan Sport	Digital streaming and online broadcasts
Qatar / International	Al Kass Sports Channels (Shoof)	Selected matches (approximately 30 per season)

== Trophy ==
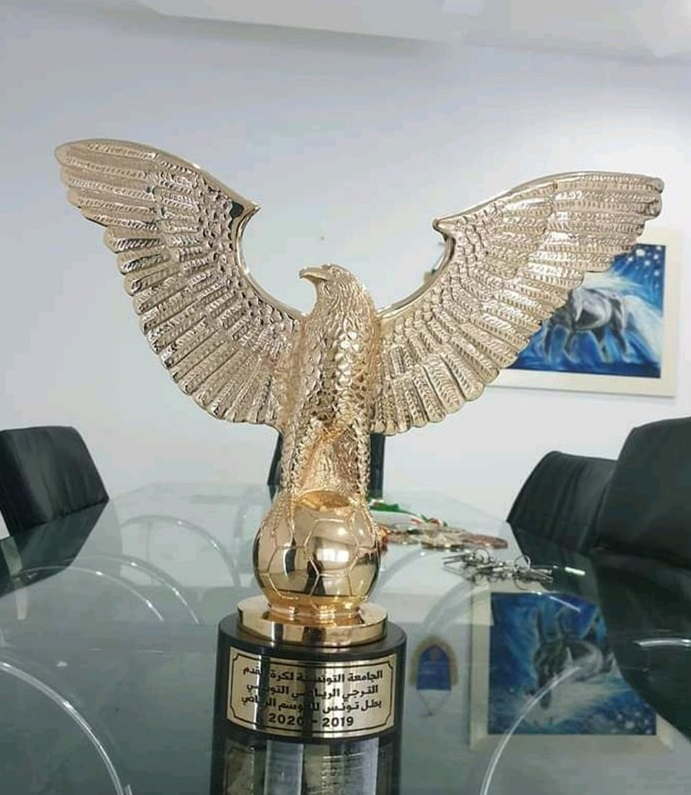
Current Tunisian Ligue Professionnelle 1 trophy since the 2019–20 season.

According to the competition regulations, the Tunisian Football Federation adopts a new championship trophy every time a club wins the title for three consecutive seasons. Five cups have been adopted in the history of the competition since independence. The first trophy, a lion stretching out on a tree trunk, was adopted in the 1957-58 season, the first season organized by the Tunisian Football Federation. The first team to hoist it was Étoile Sportive du Sahel, and many other teams have won it, including Espérance Sportive de Tunis, Stade Tunisien, Étoile Sportive du Sahel, Club Africain, CS Sfaxien, Sfax RS, and JS Kairouan.

It remained in use until the 1999–2000 season, after Espérance Sportive de Tunis won the championship for three consecutive seasons. The second trophy is a cup in the shape of an open-winged eagle standing on a football, mounted on a green marble base, and imported from Italy. Remarkably, Espérance Sportive de Tunis is the only team to have hoisted this cup and retained it so early, having won the championship for three consecutive seasons. The third trophy, also in the form of a closed-winged eagle centered on a wooden base, was imported from Italy and has been used since the 2003–04 season. It was first worn by Espérance Sportive de Tunis and won by other teams, including Étoile Sportive du Sahel, CS Sfaxien, and Club Africain. Espérance Sportive de Tunis retained it after winning the championship for three consecutive seasons.

The fourth trophy, an iron pole with a bronze football and two iron handles on top, was imported from France and adopted since the 2011–12 season. It was first worn by Espérance Sportive de Tunis and won by other teams, including Étoile Sportive du Sahel, CS Sfaxien, and Club Africain. Espérance Sportive de Tunis retained it after winning the championship for three consecutive seasons. The fifth emblem, adopted since the 2019–20 season, is an eagle with outstretched wings. This emblem is distinguished by its Tunisian design and manufacture. It weighs 17 kg, is 14 cm thick, is 50 cm long, and is 88 cm wide. The trophy is made of bronze and coated in 18-karat gold.

== Stadiums ==
2026–27 season stadiums
Tunis	La Marsa	Bizerte	Hammam-Lif	Sfax	Sousse	Monastir
Hammadi Agrebi Stadium	Abdelaziz Chtioui Stadium	15 October Stadium	Bou Kornine Stadium	Taieb Mhiri Stadium	Sousse Olympic Stadium	Mustapha Ben Jannet Stadium
Capacity: 65,000	Capacity: 6,500	Capacity: 20,000	Capacity: 15,000	Capacity: 12,600	Capacity: 40,000	Capacity: 20,000
Espérance de Tunis; Club Africain	AS Marsa	CA Bizertin	CS Hammam-Lif	CS Sfaxien; PS Sakiet Eddaïer	Étoile du Sahel	US Monastir
Hammam Sousse	Métlaoui	Zarzis	Tunis	Béja	Le Bardo	Ben Guerdane
Bou Ali Lahouar Stadium	Métlaoui Municipal Stadium	Abdessalam Kazouz Stadium	Chedly Zouiten Stadium	Boujemaa Kmiti Stadium	Hédi Enneifer Stadium	7 March Stadium
Capacity: 6,500	Capacity: 4,000	Capacity: 10,000	Capacity: 18,000	Capacity: 8,000	Capacity: 11,000	Capacity: 10,000
ES Hammam Sousse	ES Métlaoui	ES Zarzis	JS El Omrane	Olympique Béja	Stade Tunisien	US Ben Guerdane

== Format ==
As the 2026–27 season, the Tunisian Ligue Professionnelle 1 consists of sixteen clubs, each playing each other home and away. The champion is the team with the most points after the 30 matchdays. At the end of the season, the champion and runner-up qualify for the CAF Champions League, the third-placed team and the winner of the Tunisian Cup qualify for the CAF Confederation Cup, and the bottom three teams are relegated to Tunisian Ligue Professionnelle 2 the following year. The standings are calculated using the following points system: a win is worth three points, a draw one point, and a loss earns no points.

In the event of a tie, the following tiebreakers are used:

1. Higher head-to-head record;
2. Higher goal difference in head-to-head record;
3. Higher goal difference overall;
4. Higher number of goals scored.
5. Fair Play Ranking;
6. Play-off match between the two teams.

== Qualification for African competitions ==
=== Association ranking for the 2025–26 CAF club season ===
The association ranking for the 2025–26 CAF Champions League and the 2025–26 CAF Confederation Cup will be based on results from each CAF club competition from 2020–21 to the 2024–25 season.

Legend

- CL: CAF Champions League
- CC: CAF Confederation Cup
- ≥: Associations points might increase on basis of its clubs performance in 2024–25 CAF club competitions
- Associations ranked 1–12 are eligible to enter two teams in each CAF club competition.

Rank			Association	2020–21 (× 1)		2021–22 (× 2)		2022–23 (× 3)		2023–24 (× 4)		2024–25 (× 5)		Total
2025	2024	Mvt	Association	CL	CC	CL	CC	CL	CC	CL	CC	CL	CC	Total
1	1	—	Egypt	8	3	7	4	8	2.5	7	7	10	4	190.5
2	2	—	Morocco	4	6	9	5	8	2	2	4	5	5	142
3	4	+1	South Africa	8	2	5	4	4	3	4	1.5	9	3	131
4	3	-1	Algeria	6	5	7	1	6	5	2	3	5	5	130
5	6	+1	Tanzania	3	0.5	0	2	3	4	6	0	2	4	82.5
6	5	-1	Tunisia	4	3	5	1	4	2	6	1	3	0.5	82.5
7	8	+1	Angola	1	0	5	0	2	0	3	1.5	2	2	55
8	7	-1	DR Congo	4	0	0	3	1	2	4	0	2	0	45
9	9	—	Sudan	3	0	3	0	3	0	2	0	3	0	41
10	11	+1	Ivory Coast	0	0	0	1	0	3	3	0	1	2	38
11	10	-1	Libya	0	0.5	0	5	0	0.5	0	3	0	0	24
12	12	—	Nigeria	0	2	0	0	0	2	0	2	0	1	21

== Current season ==
=== 2026–27 season participating Clubs ===
Locations of the 2026–27 season teams.

Team	Location	Stadium	Capacity
AS Marsa	Tunis (La Marsa)	Abdelaziz Chtioui Stadium	6,500
Club Africain	Tunis (Bab Jedid)	Hammadi Agrebi Stadium	65,000
CA Bizertin	Bizerte	15 October Stadium	20,000
CS Hammam-Lif	Tunis (Hammam-Lif)	Bou Kornine Stadium	15,000
CS Sfaxien	Sfax	Taieb Mhiri Stadium	12,600
ES Hammam Sousse	Sousse (Hammam Sousse)	Bou Ali Lahouar Stadium	6,500
ES Métlaoui	Métlaoui	Métlaoui Municipal Stadium	4,000
Étoile du Sahel	Sousse	Sousse Olympic Stadium	40,000
Espérance de Tunis	Tunis (Bab Souika)	Hammadi Agrebi Stadium	65,000
ES Zarzis	Zarzis	Abdessalam Kazouz Stadium	10,000
JS El Omrane	Tunis (El Omrane)	Chedly Zouiten Stadium	18,000
Olympique Béja	Béja	Boujemaa Kmiti Stadium	8,000
PS Sakiet Eddaïer	Sfax (Sakiet Eddaïer)	Taieb Mhiri Stadium	12,600
Stade Tunisien	Tunis (Le Bardo)	Hédi Enneifer Stadium	11,000
US Ben Guerdane	Ben Guerdane	7 March Stadium	10,000
US Monastir	Monastir	Mustapha Ben Jannet Stadium	20,000

== Champions ==
=== By club ===
Rank	Club	Titles	Winning seasons
1	**Espérance de Tunis**	34	1941–42, 1958–59, 1959–60, 1969–70, 1974–75, 1975–76, 1981–82, 1984–85, 1987–88, 1988–89, 1990–91, 1992–93, 1993–94, 1997–98, 1998–99, 1999–00, 2000–01, 2001–02, 2002–03, 2003–04, 2005–06, 2008–09, 2009–10, 2010–11, 2011–12, 2013–14, 2016–17, 2017–18, 2018–19, 2019–20, 2020–21, 2021–22, 2023–24, 2024–25
2	**Club Africain**	14	1946–47, 1947–48, 1963–64, 1966–67, 1972–73, 1973–74, 1978–79, 1979–80, 1989–90, 1991–92, 1995–96, 2007–08, 2014–15, 2025–26
3	**Étoile du Sahel**	11	1949–50, 1957–58, 1962–63, 1965–66, 1971–72, 1985–86, 1986–87, 1996–97, 2006–07, 2015–16, 2022–23
5	Racing Club de Tunis	9	1907, 1908–09, 1909–10, 1910–11, 1913–14, 1919–20, 1920–21, 1921–22, 1924–25
4	**CS Sfaxien**	8	1968–69, 1970–71, 1977–78, 1980–81, 1982–83, 1994–95, 2004–05, 2012–13
6	**CS Hammam-Lif**	4	1950–51, 1953–54, 1954–55, 1955–56
6	**Stade Tunisien**	4	1956–57, 1960–61, 1961–62, 1964–65
6	**CA Bizertin**	4	1944–45, 1945–46, 1948–49, 1983–84
6	Italia de Tunis	4	1931–32, 1934–35, 1935–36, 1936–37
10	Sfax RS	3	1933–34, 1952–53, 1967–68
10	US Tunis	3	1929–30, 1930–31, 1932–33
10	Stade Gaulois de Tunis	3	1922–23, 1923–24, 1926–27
13	Sporting de Ferryville	2	1911–12, 1912–13
13	Sporting Club de Tunis	2	1925–26, 1927–28
15	JS Kairouan	1	1976–77
15	Savoia de la Goulette	1	1937–38
15	CS Gabésien	1	1938–39
15	Avant Garde de Tunis	1	1928–29

- Teams in **bold** compete in 2026–27 Ligue 1.
- Teams in italics are defunct.

=== By region ===
Region	Titles	Club(s)
Tunis	75	Espérance de Tunis (34), Club Africain (14), Racing Club de Tunis (9), Stade Tunisien (4), Italia de Tunis (4), US Tunis (3), Stade Gaulois de Tunis (3), Sporting de Tunis (2), Savoia de la Goulette (1), Avant Garde de Tunis (1).
Sfax	11	CS Sfaxien (8), Sfax RS (3)
Sousse	11	Étoile du Sahel (11)
Bizerte	6	CA Bizertin (4) Sporting de Ferryville (2)
Ben Arous	4	CS Hammam-Lif (4)
Kairouan	1	JS Kairouan (1)
Gabès	1	CS Gabésien (1)

- Teams in italics are defunct.

== Performance comparison since 2010 ==
Performance comparison of top teams since 2009–10 season.

Teams	2009–10	2010–11	2011–12	2012–13	2013–14	2014–15	2015–16	2016–17	2017–18	2018–19	2019–20	2020–21	2021–22	2022–23	2023–24	2024–25	2025–26
Espérance de Tunis	1	1	1	2	1	3	2	1	1	1	1	1	1	2	1	1	2
Étoile du Sahel	3	2	4	3	3	2	1	2	3	2	4	2	5	1	5	3	7
CS Sfaxien	6	3	3	1	2	4	3	4	4	3	2	5	3	6	3	7	3
Club Africain	2	4	6	4	4	1	6	3	2	5	5	7	4	3	6	4	1
US Monastir	–	–	7	5	10	14	–	–	6	7	3	10	2	4	2	2	5
League champions Champions League; Confederation Cup; Relegation

== Records and statistics ==
=== Titled Managers ===
Over the course of 71 seasons, 40 coaches have managed to win the title. Faouzi Benzarti has won the tournament on a record eleven occasions with Espérance de Tunis (5), Étoile du Sahel (4) and Club Africain (2), while Youssef Zouaoui have won the title on five occasions with Espérance de Tunis (4) and CA Bizertin (1).

Manager	Titles	Club(s)	Winning seasons
(Tunisia) Faouzi Benzarti	11	Étoile du Sahel, Espérance de Tunis, Club Africain	1986–87, 1989–90, 1993–94, 2002–03, 2006–07, 2008–09, 2009–10, 2015–16, 2016–17, 2022–23, 2025–26
(Tunisia) Youssef Zouaoui	5	CA Bizertin, Espérance de Tunis	1983–84, 1997–98, 1998–99, 1999–2000, 2000–01
(Algeria) Habib Draoua	3	Stade Tunisien, Espérance de Tunis	1956–57, 1959–60, 1960–61
(Tunisia) Ahmed Dhib	3	Espérance de Tunis, Étoile du Sahel	1974–75, 1975–76, 1981–82
(Tunisia) Mouine Chaabani	3	Espérance de Tunis	2018–19, 2019–20, 2020–21
(Tunisia) Nabil Maâloul	3	Espérance de Tunis	2010–11, 2011–12, 2021–22
(Switzerland) Michel Decastel	2	Espérance de Tunis, CS Sfaxien	2001–02, 2004–05
(Tunisia) Khaled Ben Yahia	2	Espérance de Tunis	2005–06, 2017–18
(Netherlands) Ruud Krol	2	CS Sfaxien, Espérance de Tunis	2012–13, 2013–14
(England) George Berry	2	CS Hammam-Lif, Étoile du Sahel	1955–56, 1957–58
(Italy) Fabio Roccheggiani	2	Club Africain	1963–64, 1966–67
(Hungary) André Nagy	2	Club Africain	1978–79, 1979–80
(Poland) Antoni Piechniczek	2	Espérance de Tunis	1987–88, 1988–89
(Socialist Federal Republic of Yugoslavia) Milor Popov	2	CS Sfaxien	1977–78, 1982–83
(Tunisia) Jamel Eddine Bouabsa	2	Club Africain	1972–73, 1973–74
(Tunisia) Hechmi Cherif	1	Espérance de Tunis	1958–59
(Tunisia) Rachid Turki	1	Stade Tunisien	1961–62
(Socialist Federal Republic of Yugoslavia) Božidar Drenovac	1	Étoile du Sahel	1962–63
(Tunisia) Ammar Nahali	1	Stade Tunisien	1964–65
(Soviet Union) Aleksei Paramonov	1	Étoile du Sahel	1965–66
(Hungary) Laszlo Balogh	1	Sfax railway sport	1967–68
(Socialist Federal Republic of Yugoslavia) Branislav Acimovic	1	CS Sfaxien	1968–69
(Tunisia) Abderrahmane Ben Ezzedine	1	Espérance de Tunis	1969–70
(Socialist Federal Republic of Yugoslavia) Jivko Popadic	1	CS Sfaxien	1970–71
(Tunisia) Abdelmajid Chetali	1	Étoile du Sahel	1971–72
(Socialist Federal Republic of Yugoslavia) Dragan Vasiljević	1	JS Kairouan	1976–77
(Germany) Michael Pfeiffer	1	CS Sfaxien	1980–81
(Brazil) Amarildo	1	Espérance de Tunis	1984–85
(Tunisia) Amor Dhib	1	Étoile du Sahel	1985–86
(Poland) Władysław Żmuda	1	Espérance de Tunis	1990–91
(Romania) Ilie Balaci	1	Club Africain	1991–92
(Poland) Zdzisław Podedworny	1	Espérance de Tunis	1992–93
(Brazil) José Paulo	1	CS Sfaxien	1994–95
(France) Jean Sérafin	1	Club Africain	1995–96
(Brazil) José Dutra dos Santos	1	Étoile du Sahel	1996–97
(Argentina) Oscar Fulloné	1	Espérance de Tunis	2003–04
(Algeria) Abdelhak Benchikha	1	Club Africain	2007–08
(France) Daniel Sanchez	1	Club Africain	2014–15
(Portugal) Miguel Cardoso	1	Espérance de Tunis	2023–24
(Tunisia) Maher Kanzari	1	Espérance de Tunis	2024–25

=== Most titled players ===
Player	Titles	Club	Winning seasons
(Tunisia) Khalil Chemmam	12	Espérance de Tunis	2005–06, 2008–09, 2009–10, 2010–11, 2011–12, 2013–14, 2016–17, 2017–18, 2018–19, 2019–20, 2020–21, 2021–22
(Tunisia) Moez Ben Cherifia	11	Espérance de Tunis	2009–10, 2010–11, 2011–12, 2013–14, 2016–17, 2017–18, 2018–19, 2019–20, 2020–21, 2021–22, 2023–24
(Tunisia) Chokri El Ouaer	10	Espérance de Tunis	1987–88, 1988–89, 1990–91, 1992–93, 1993–94, 1997–98, 1998–99, 1999–00, 2000–01, 2001–02
(Tunisia) Tarek Thabet	10	Espérance de Tunis	1990–91, 1992–93, 1993–94, 1997–98, 1998–99, 1999–00, 2000–01, 2001–02, 2002–03, 2003–04
(Tunisia) Sameh Derbali	8	Espérance de Tunis	2008–09, 2010–11, 2011–12, 2013–14, 2017–18, 2018–19, 2019–20, 2020–21, 2021–22
(Tunisia) Nabil Maâloul	8	Espérance de Tunis, Club Africain	1975–76, 1980–81, 1984–85, 1987–88, 1992–93, 1993–94, 1995–96
(Tunisia) Khaled Badra	8	Espérance de Tunis	1997–98, 1998–99, 1999–00, 2001–02, 2003–04, 2005–06, 2008–09
(Tunisia) Khaled Ben Yahia	8	Espérance de Tunis	1981–82, 1984–85, 1987–88, 1988–89, 1990–91, 1992–93, 1993–94
(Tunisia) Mouin Chaâbani	6	Espérance de Tunis	1999–00, 2000–01, 2001–02, 2002–03, 2003–04, 2005–06
(Tunisia) Ali Zitouni	6	Espérance de Tunis	1998–99, 1999–00, 2000–01, 2001–02, 2002–03, 2003–04
(Tunisia) Sirajeddine Chihi	6	Espérance de Tunis	1992–93, 1993–94, 1997–98, 1998–99, 1999–00, 2000–01
(Tunisia) Taoufik Hicheri	6	Espérance de Tunis	1984–85, 1987–88, 1988–89, 1990–91, 1997–98, 1998–99
(Tunisia) Radhi Jaïdi	6	Espérance de Tunis	1997–98, 1998–99, 1999–00, 2000–01, 2001–02, 2002–03
(Tunisia) Tarak Dhiab	6	Espérance de Tunis	1974–75, 1975–76, 1981–82, 1984–85, 1987–88, 1988–89
(Tunisia) Walid Azaiez	5	Espérance de Tunis	1998–99, 1999–00, 2000–01, 2001–02, 2002–03
(Tunisia) Sadok Sassi	5	Club Africain	1963–64, 1966–67, 1972–73, 1973–74, 1978–79
(Tunisia) Mejdi Traoui	5	Étoile du Sahel, Espérance de Tunis	2006–07, 2009–10, 2010–11, 2011–12, 2013–14
(Tunisia) Wassim Naouara	5	Espérance de Tunis	2008–09, 2009–10, 2010–11, 2011–12, 2013–14
(Tunisia) Mohamed Ben Mansour	5	Espérance de Tunis	2008–09, 2009–10, 2010–11, 2011–12, 2013–14

== Top scorers ==
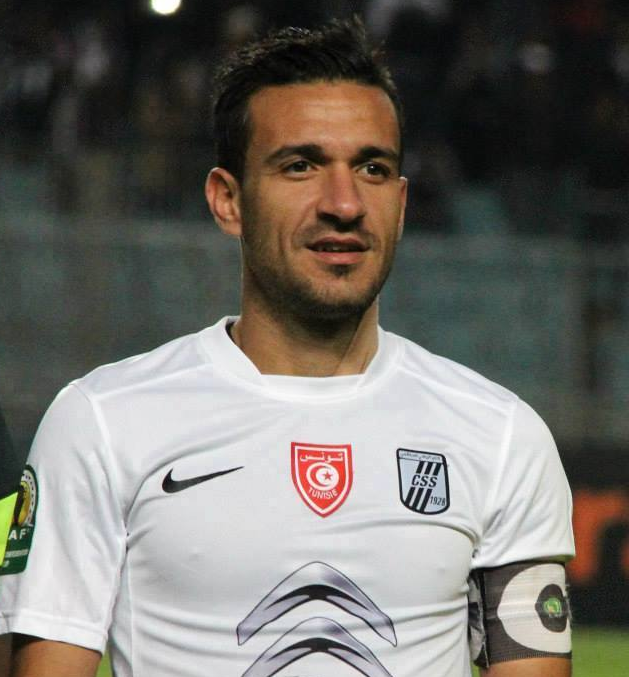
Ali Maâloul of CS Sfaxien is the 2015–16 season top scorer with 16 goals.

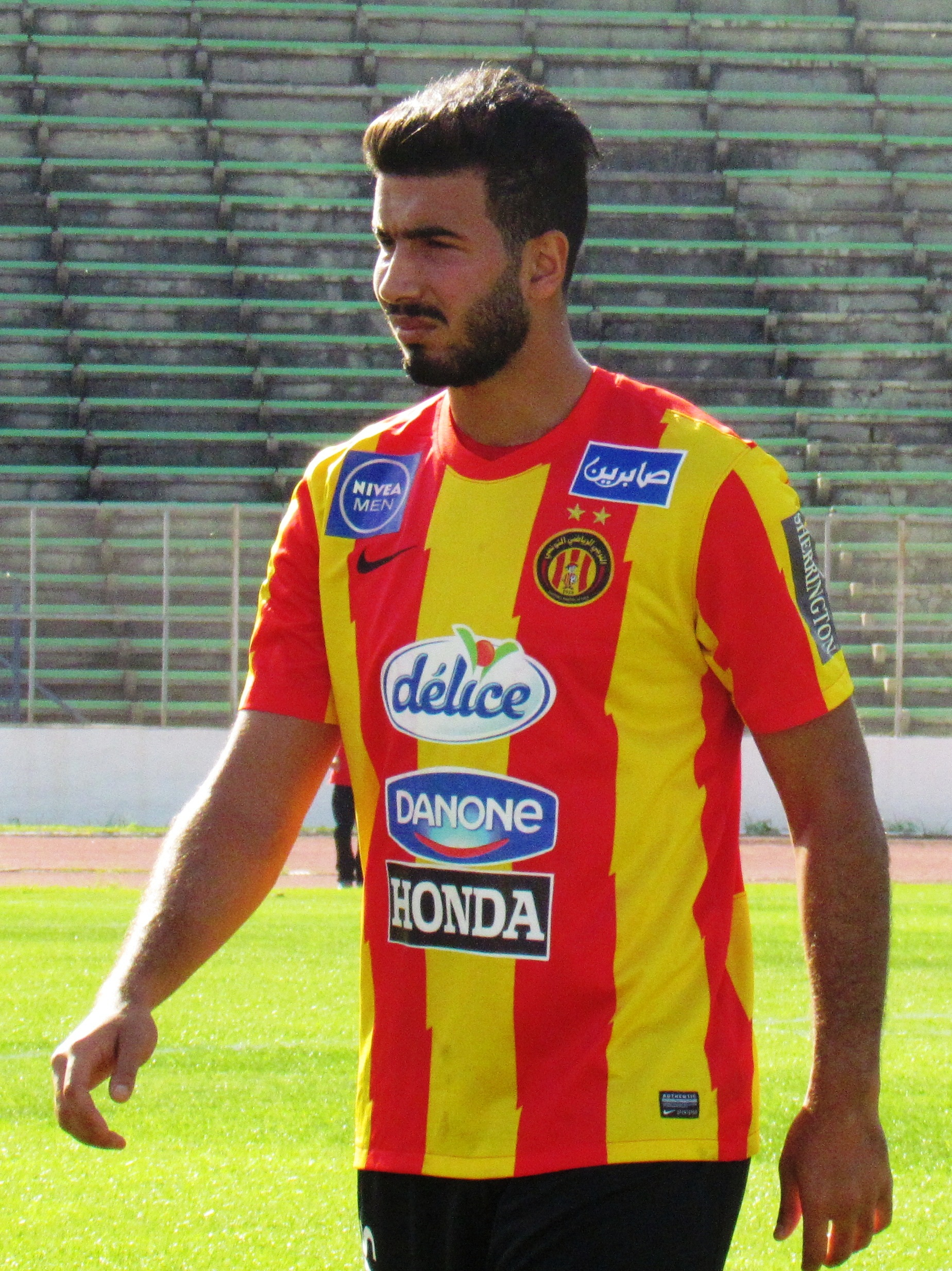
Haythem Jouini of Espérance de Tunis is the 2012–13 season top scorer with 8 goals.

The day after Tunisia's independence in 1956, the newspaper Le Petit Matin took charge of establishing the classification of the top scorer in the Tunisian Ligue Professionnelle 1. The newspaper Al Amal took over in 1961 then it was L'Action Tunisienne which formalized the classification and endowed it with a price from 1967, in parallel with the weekly Le Sport. Then, with the development of the media and the coverage of Tunisian Ligue Professionnelle 1 matches, this ranking becomes more known.

=== All-time top scorers ===
Rank	Players	Goals	Clubs
1	(Tunisia) Ezzedine Chakroun	116	Sfax RS
2	(Tunisia) Hédi Bayari	110	Club Africain
3	(Tunisia) Tarak Dhiab	107	Espérance de Tunis
4	(Tunisia) Habib Mougou	99	Étoile du Sahel
5	(Tunisia) Mohamed Salah Jedidi	98	Club Africain
6	(Tunisia) Adel Sellimi	90	Club Africain
7	(Tunisia) Abdelkader Ben Hassen	89	CO Transports (44), Espérance de Tunis (12), CA Bizertin (33)
8	(Tunisia) Abdelmajid Tlemçani	89	Espérance de Tunis
9	(Tunisia) Abdelhamid Hergal	85	Stade Tunisien
10	(Tunisia) Nabil Bechaouch	82	Olympique Béja (71), Stade Tunisien (8), CS Sfaxien (3)
11	(Tunisia) Moncef Khouini	81	Club Africain
11	(Tunisia) Sami Touati	81	Club Africain (80), Stade Tunisien (1)
12	(Tunisia) Mongi Dalhoum	80	CS Sfaxien
13	(Tunisia) Abderraouf Ben Aziza	79	Étoile du Sahel (70), CS Hammam-Lif (9)
14	(Tunisia) Faouzi Rouissi	78	Club Africain
14	(Tunisia) Noureddine Diwa	78	Stade Tunisien (75), Espérance de Tunis (3)
14	(Tunisia) Abdesselem Chemam	78	AS Marsa
15	(Tunisia) Mohamed Akid	77	CS Sfaxien
16	(Tunisia) Hamadi Agrebi	75	CS Sfaxien
16	(Tunisia) Mohieddine Habita	75	CO Transports
17	(Tunisia) Saâd Karmous	74	CS Hammam-Lif (72), US Tunis (2)
18	(Tunisia) Moncef Chérif	71	Stade Tunisien
18	(Tunisia) Moncef Ouada	71	JS Kairouan
19	(Tunisia) Jameleddine Limam	70	Stade Tunisien (49), Club Africain (21)

=== Top scorers by season ===
This is the list of top scorers by season.

1955–56: (Tunisia) Habib Mougou (ESS) (25); 1956–57: (Tunisia) Brahim Ben Miled (JS Métouienne) (20); 1957–58: (Tunisia) Habib Mougou (ESS); (Tunisia) Boubaker Haddad (CAB) (28): 1958–59: (Tunisia) Abdelmajid Tlemçani (EST) (32); 1959–60: (Tunisia) Abdelmajid Tlemçani (EST) (22); 1960–61: (Tunisia) Ammar Merrichkou (ASM) (18); 1961–62: (Tunisia) Chedly Laaouini (EST) (16); 1962–63: (Tunisia) Mokhtar Chelbi (ASM) (16); 1963–64: (Tunisia) Mongi Dalhoum (CSS) (15); 1964–65: (Tunisia) Mohamed Salah Jedidi (CA) (17); 1965–66: (Tunisia) Mongi Dalhoum (CSS) (18); 1966–67: (Tunisia) Abdelwahab Lahmar (ST) (14); 1967–68: (Tunisia) Kamel Henia (CSHL) (10); 1968–69: (Tunisia) Mohamed Salah Jedidi (CA) (17); 1969–70: (Tunisia) Othman Jenayah (ESS) (15); 1970–71: (Tunisia) Abdesselam Adhouma (ESS) (17); 1971–72: (Tunisia) Moncef Khouini (CA) (12); 1972–73: (Tunisia) Ezzedine Chakroun (SRS) (23); 1973–74: (Tunisia) Abdesselam Adhouma (ESS) (16); 1974–75: (Tunisia) Zoubeir Ghenia (EST) (24); 1975–76: (Tunisia) Abderraouf Ben Aziza (ESS) (20); 1976–77: (Tunisia) Moncef Ouada (JSK) (16); 1977–78: (Tunisia) Abderraouf Ben Aziza (ESS) (20); 1978–79: (Tunisia) Mahmoud Tebourski (OK) (13); 1979–80: (Tunisia) Hédi Bayari (CA) (14); 1980–81: (Tunisia) Habib Gasmi (CA) (16); 1981–82: (Tunisia) Riadh El Fahem (EST) (13)	1982–83: (Tunisia) Hédi Bayari (CA) (17); 1983–84: (Tunisia) Hédi Bayari (CA) (12); 1984–85: (Tunisia) Faouzi Henchiri (COT) (9); 1985–86: (Tunisia) Nabil Tasco (CSHL) (12); 1986–87: (Tunisia) Adnène Laajili (USM) (14); 1987–88: (Tunisia) Nabil Maâloul (EST) (14); 1988–89: (Tunisia) Abdelhamid Hergal (ST) (15); 1989–90: (Tunisia) Faouzi Rouissi (CA) (18); 1990–91: (Tunisia) Fethi Chehaibi "Bargou" (JSK) (15); 1991–92: (Tunisia) Hechmi Sassi (ST); (Tunisia) Amor Ben Tahar (OCK) (14): 1992–93: (Tunisia) Abdelkader Ben Hassen (CAB); (Zambia) Kenneth Malitoli (EST) (18): 1993–94: (Zambia) Kenneth Malitoli (EST) (14); 1994–95: (Tunisia) Belhassen Aloui (CSHL) (18); 1995–96: (Tunisia) Sami Touati (CA) (17); 1996–97: (Tunisia) Sami Laaroussi (EST) (14); 1997–98: (Tunisia) Abdelkader Ben Hassen (EST); (Tunisia) Ziad Tlemçani (EST) (15): 1998–99: (Tunisia) Francileudo Santos (ESS) (14); 1999–2000: (Tunisia) Ali Zitouni (EST) (19); 2000–01: (Tunisia) Oussama Sellami (ST) (11); 2001–02: (Ivory Coast) Kandia Traoré (EST) (13); 2002–03: (Tunisia) Mohamed Selliti (ST) (12); 2003–04: (Tunisia) Nabil Missaoui (CA); (Tunisia) Haykel Guemamdia (CSS) (Mali) Tenema N'Diaye (CSS) (9): 2004–05: (Tunisia) Haykel Guemamdia (CSS) (12); 2005–06: (Tunisia) Amine Ltaïef (EST) (16); 2006–07: (Tunisia) Tarek Ziadi (CSS) (13); 2007–08: (Tunisia) Wissem Ben Yahia (CA) (10); 2008–09: (Nigeria) Michael Eneramo (EST) (18); 2009–10: (Nigeria) Michael Eneramo (EST) (12); 2010–11: (Tunisia) Ahmed Akaïchi (ESS) (14); 2011–12: (Tunisia) Youssef Msakni (EST) (17)	2012–13: (Tunisia) Haythem Jouini (EST) (8); 2013–14: (Algeria) Baghdad Bounedjah (ESS) (14); 2014–15: (Tunisia) Saber Khalifa (CA) (15); 2015–16: (Tunisia) Ali Maâloul (CSS) (16); 2016–17: (Tunisia) Taha Yassine Khenissi (EST) (14); 2017–18: (Tunisia) Alaeddine Marzouki (CSS); (Tunisia) Lassaad Jaziri (USBG) (10): 2018–19: (Tunisia) Taha Yassine Khenissi (EST); (Tunisia) Firas Chaouat (CSS) (10): 2019–20: (Nigeria) Anthony Okpotu (USM) (13); 2020–21: (Tunisia) Aymen Sfaxi (ESS) (9); 2021–22: (Tunisia) Mohamed Ali Ben Hammouda (ASS and EST) (10); 2022–23: (Tunisia) Rafik Kamergi (USBG) (14); 2023–24: (Mali) Boubacar Traoré (USM); (Tunisia) Taieb Ben Zitoun (CAB) (Brazil) Rodrigo Rodrigues (EST) (10): 2024–25: (Tunisia) Firas Chaouat (ESS) (17); 2025–26: (Tunisia) Firas Chaouat (CA) (15)

== All-time table ==
The classification of the Tunisian Ligue Professionnelle 1 table all seasons combined is a classification which aims to determine which team in the history of the Tunisian football championship has had the most success, not by the number of titles but by the number of points. This ranking combines all the points and goals of each team that has played in the Tunisian championship since independence in 1956 until the end of the 2025–26 season:

Pos	Team	S	GP	W	D	L	GF	GA	Pts
1	Espérance de Tunis	71	1796	1040	494	262	2982	1316	4178
2	Club Africain	71	1796	885	579	332	2448	1362	3772
3	Étoile du Sahel	69	1754	907	498	349	2572	1411	3735
4	CS Sfaxien	71	1796	747	576	473	2222	1679	3403
5	Stade Tunisien	70	1738	646	545	547	2036	1747	3051
6	CA Bizertin	69	1737	585	553	599	1775	1777	2902
7	CS Hammam-Lif	59	1480	439	449	592	1485	1745	2357
8	AS Marsa	56	1414	450	434	530	1526	1614	2353
9	US Monastir	52	1316	388	451	477	1262	1417	2110
10	Sfax railway sport	34	864	260	291	313	878	977	1642
11	JS Kairouan	41	1070	318	313	439	1034	1270	1593
12	CO Transports	28	708	205	226	277	683	849	1264
13	Olympique Béja	35	880	248	268	364	778	992	1172
14	ES Zarzis	25	640	167	200	273	531	733	720
15	Stade Gabèsien	15	384	90	111	183	308	541	521
16	OC Kerkennah	13	338	73	113	152	269	429	513
17	Stade Soussien	12	282	74	80	128	271	371	485
18	US Tunis	10	236	75	69	92	341	343	455
19	ES Métlaoui	13	348	108	108	132	309	380	440
20	EGS Gafsa	15	396	99	114	183	374	528	431
21	Olympique du Kef	13	328	72	92	164	264	476	421
22	CS Cheminots	9	228	47	71	110	193	330	397
23	El Makarem de Mahdia	9	222	48	75	99	163	290	393
24	US Ben Guerdane	11	296	89	93	114	243	290	368
25	SS Sfaxien	7	182	33	48	101	151	300	296
26	AS Gabès	10	278	54	77	147	206	384	260
27	AS Kasserine	7	186	46	49	91	138	268	256
28	AS Soliman	7	178	52	43	83	145	206	201
29	ES Hammam Sousse	8	192	42	68	82	159	236	194
30	JS Metouia	4	100	26	36	38	158	193	188
31	US Tataouine	7	177	44	51	82	148	258	187
32	Stade populaire	4	98	26	29	43	126	158	179
33	US Maghrébine	4	100	20	33	47	79	147	173
34	El Ahly Mateur	4	88	19	15	54	75	204	141
35	SA Menzel Bourguiba	3	72	27	12	33	124	156	138
36	USM Olympique	3	72	16	13	43	104	202	117
37	PFC Bizertin	3	72	14	14	44	81	169	114
38	AS Oued Ellil	2	52	12	11	29	40	72	99
39	ES Beni-Khalled	5	142	22	36	84	94	228	98
40	AS Rejiche	4	81	24	26	31	72	78	98
41	AS Megrine	2	52	9	16	27	42	88	86
42	CO Médenine	4	102	21	21	60	72	170	84
43	EO La Goulette Kram	3	78	17	28	33	53	85	79
44	Stade Africain Menzel Bourguiba	2	52	8	10	34	48	87	78
45	Jendouba Sport	3	78	14	30	34	45	78	72
46	Patriote de Sousse	2	48	4	11	33	42	133	67
47	JS El Omrane	2	60	14	20	26	49	79	62
48	Olympique Sidi Bouzid	2	54	16	10	28	46	69	58
49	CS Chebba	3	54	13	15	26	47	60	54
50	AS Djerba	3	74	14	12	48	68	134	54
51	CS Menzel Bouzelfa	1	26	3	13	10	21	31	45
52	LPS Tozeur	1	40	10	14	16	36	46	44
53	STIA Sousse	1	26	5	7	14	17	31	43
54	AS Ariana	1	26	5	6	15	26	44	42
55	CS Korba	1	26	3	6	17	14	47	38
56	FC Jerissa	1	24	3	5	16	13	48	35
57	PS Sakiet Eddaïer	0	0	0	0	0	0	0	0

Tunisian Ligue Professionnelle 1
Tunisian Ligue Professionnelle 2
Tunisian Ligue 3
Tunisian Ligue 4
Tunisian Ligue 5
Defunct clubs

== African and international competitions ==
=== Results in African and intercontinental competitions (CAF and FIFA) ===
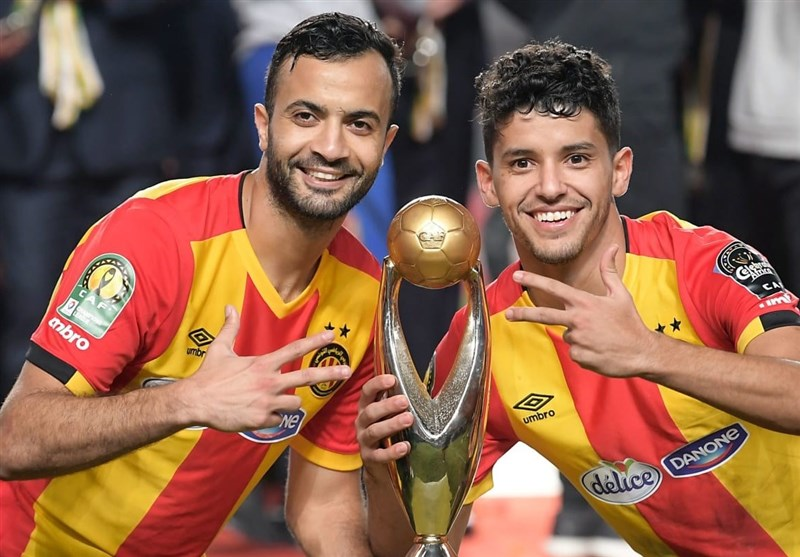
Espérance Sportive de Tunis, winner of the 2018 CAF Champions League.

Tunisian teams are among the best African teams with a total of 24 continental titles. Twelve Tunisian teams in total have played in African competitions, with Étoile du Sahel being the one that has won the most African competitions with nine titles, followed by Espérance de Tunis with eight titles. In the former FIFA Club World Cup format, now reclassified as the FIFA Intercontinental Cup, Tunisian clubs have participated four times: three for Espérance de Tunis in 2011, 2018 and 2019 (thanks to their CAF Champions League titles in 2011, 2018 and 2019) and one for Étoile du Sahel, which finished fourth in 2007, the best result for a Tunisian team in this competition. In the new FIFA Club World Cup, Espérance de Tunis participated in the 2025 edition, where they were eliminated in the group stage.

In the CAF Champions League, Tunisian clubs occupy a prominent place in the competition. Espérance de Tunis has the most participations in the competition (25). They reached the final eight times, with four victories in 1994, 2011, 2018 and 2019.

As for Étoile du Sahel, they participated thirteen times and reached the final three times (one victory in 2007); Club Africain participated ten times with a victory in 1991, while CS Sfaxien, with four participations, had to settle for second place in 2006. In the CAF Confederation Cup, Tunisian clubs are the most successful in the history of this competition with five titles. CS Sfaxien is the most successful team with three titles in 2007, 2008 and 2013, followed by Étoile du Sahel with two titles in 2006 and 2015. As for the CAF Super Cup, thirteen participations yielded only three victories: two for Étoile du Sahel in 1998 and 2008 (runners-up in 2004, 2007 and 2016) and one for Espérance de Tunis in 1995 (runners-up in 1999, 2012, 2019 and 2020); CS Sfaxien participated three times in 2008, 2009 and 2014, including once against Étoile du Sahel in 2008.

Club	CAF Champions League	CAF Confederation Cup	Super Cup	CAF Cup	African Cup Winners' Cup	African Football League	Afro-Asian Club Championship	FIFA Club World Cup
Espérance de Tunis	Winner; 1994, 2011, 2018, 2019	Group stage 2006, 2015	Winner; 1995	Winner; 1997	Winner; 1998	Semi-finalist; 2023	Winner; 1995	5th place 2018, 2019 Group stage 2025
Étoile du Sahel	Winner; 2007	Winner; 2006, 2015	Winner; 1998, 2008	Winner; 1995, 1999	Winner; 1997, 2003	—	—	Fourth place 2007
CS Sfaxien	Runner-up; 2006	Winner; 2007, 2008, 2013	Runner-up; 2008, 2009, 2014	Winner; 1998	—	—	—	—
Club Africain	Winner; 1991	Runner-up; 2011	—	Semi-finalist; 2003	Runner-up; 1990, 1999	—	Winner; 1992	—
CA Bizertin	Round of 16; 1985	Semi-finalist; 2013	—	Semi-finalist; 1992	Winner; 1988	—	—	—
CS Hammam-Lif	—	—	—	—	Semi-finalist; 1986	—	—	—
Olympique Béja	—	First round 2011, 2024	—	—	Quarter-finalist; 1994	—	—	—
AS Marsa	—	Group stage 2005	—	—	Quarter-finalist; 1995	—	—	—
Stade Tunisien	—	Play-off round 2004, 2025, 2026	—	—	Quarter-finalist; 1993	—	—	—
JS Kairouan	—	First round 2005	—	Quarter-finalist; 1994	—	—	—	—
US Monastir	Play-off round 2023, 2025, 2026	Quarter-finalist; 2023	—	—	—	—	—	—
EGS Gafsa	—	Play-off round 2007, 2009	—	—	—	—	—	—
US Ben Guerdane	—	First round 2018, 2020, 2022	—	—	—	—	—	—
Stade Gabèsien	—	Third round 2016	—	—	—	—	—	—
ES Zarzis	—	Second round 2027	—	—	—	—	—	—
CO Transports	—	—	—	—	First round 1989	—	—	—

=== Best finish in Arab competitions by club ===
Tunisian clubs are the second most titled Arab clubs with 11 championships (after Saudi clubs who won 12 championships). Espérance de Tunis is the most titled Tunisian club in the Arab championships with 4 championships, followed by Club Sfaxien and Stade Tunisien with two championships each.

Tunisian teams won the most prestigious Arab championships, Arab Club Champions Cup 7 times, 3 of which were for the Tunisian Espérance de Tunis, which has the record for the number of trophies in 1993, 2008–09 and 2017, two championships for the Club Sfaxien in the 2000 and 2003–04 editions, and one championship for Étoile du Sahel in 2018–19 and the same for Club Africain in 1997. As for the runners-up, the Tunisian teams took second place five times, twice for Espérance de Tunis in 1986 and 1995, twice also for Club Africain in 1988 and 2002, and Club Sfaxien in 2004–05.

Tunisian clubs have won the Arab Cup Winners' Cup three times. Stade Tunisien is the most titled Tunisian club in the championship with 2 titles in 1989 and 2001, followed by Club Africain, which won the championship only once in 1995. As for Étoile du Sahel, it was satisfied with the runner-up position in 1995 in the match that brought it together with Club Africain.

Club	Arab Club Champions Cup	Arab Cup Winners' Cup	Arab Super Cup
Espérance de Tunis	Winner; 1993, 2008–09, 2017	—	Winner; 1996
CS Sfaxien	Winner; 2000, 2003–04	—	Fourth place 2001
Club Africain	Winner; 1997	Winner; 1995	Runners-up; 1998
Stade Tunisien	Fourth place 2002	Winner; 1989, 2001	—
Étoile du Sahel	Winner; 2018–19	Runners-up; 1995	—
CA Bizertin	Semi-finalist; 1994	—	—
AS Marsa	—	Semi-finalist; 1992, 1994	—
US Monastir	Quarter-finalist; 2008–09	—	—
Olympique Béja	Group stage 1999	—	—

== See also ==
- National Professional Football League
- Tunisian Cup
- Tunisian Super Cup
