= 1973–74 Tunisian National Championship =

Tunisian National Championship
- Season: 1973–74
- Champions: Club Africain
- Relegated: JS Kairouan; Stade Sportif Sfaxien
- Matches: 182
- Goals: 382 (2.1 per match)
- Top goalscorer: Abdesselam Adhouma (Étoile du Sahel) (16 goals)

The 1973–74 Tunisian National Championship was the nineteenth season of the Tunisian national football championship following the country's independence in 1956. The competition was won by the defending champions Club Africain, who finished three points ahead of Espérance Sportive de Tunis in the final standings. It was Club Africain's fourth league title since independence and their second in a row.

The league was contested by 14 clubs, each playing 26 matches. JS Kairouan and Stade Sportif Sfaxien were relegated at the end of the campaign, while Stade Africain de Menzel Bourguiba and Patriote de Sousse were promoted for the following season.

== League table ==
Pos	Team	Pld	W	D	L	GF	GA	GD	Pts
1	Club Africain (C)	26	16	5	5	40	18	+22	63
2	Espérance de Tunis	26	11	12	3	38	22	+16	60
3	Étoile du Sahel	26	13	7	6	52	28	+24	59
4	Club Sportif Sfaxien	26	13	6	7	32	21	+11	58
5	Club Olympique des Transports	26	10	10	6	30	25	+5	56
6	El Makarem de Mahdia	26	8	10	8	22	23	−1	52
7	Club Sportif Cheminots	26	6	13	7	25	31	−6	51
8	Stade Tunisien	26	6	12	8	22	23	−1	50
9	Avenir Sportif de La Marsa	26	6	12	8	26	28	−2	50
10	Sfax Railways Sports	26	5	13	8	13	21	−8	49
11	CA Bizertin	26	7	8	11	18	27	−9	48
12	CS Hammam-Lif	26	6	9	11	15	25	−10	47
13	JS Kairouan (R)	26	4	10	12	25	38	−13	44
14	Stade Sportif Sfaxien (R)	26	4	7	15	24	52	−28	41

Source: RSSSF
Rules for classification: 1) points (3 for a win, 2 for a draw, 1 for a defeat).
(C) = Champions; (R) = Relegated.

== Top scorers ==
Abdesselam Adhouma of Étoile du Sahel was the league's top scorer with 16 goals.

== See also ==
- 1972–73 Tunisian National Championship
- 1974–75 Tunisian National Championship
- Tunisian Ligue Professionnelle 1
- Tunisian Cup
