= 1963–64 Tunisian National Championship =

Tunisian National Championship
- Season: 1963–64
- Champions: Club Africain
- Relegated: Union Sportive Monastir
- Matches: 132
- Goals: 310 (2.35 per match)
- Top goalscorer: Mongi Dalhoum (CS Sfaxien) (15 goals)

The 1963–64 Tunisian National Championship was the ninth season of the Tunisian national football championship following the country's independence in 1956. The competition was won by Club Africain, who finished ahead of Espérance Sportive de Tunis in the final standings. It was Club Africain's first league title since independence. The defending champions, Étoile Sportive du Sahel, finished sixth.

The league was contested by 12 clubs, each playing 22 matches. Union Sportive Monastir finished bottom and was relegated, while Stade Soussien, who finished 11th, won a play-off against Stade Sportif Sfaxien and stayed in the division. CS Hammam-Lif was promoted for the following season.

== League table ==
Pos	Team	Pld	W	D	L	GF	GA	GD	Pts
1	Club Africain (C)	22	11	9	2	34	10	+24	53
2	Espérance de Tunis	22	10	9	3	32	15	+17	51
3	Club Sportif Sfaxien	22	10	8	4	38	18	+20	50
4	Stade Tunisien	22	10	7	5	21	11	+10	49
5	Sfax Railways Sports	22	8	9	5	25	25	0	47
6	Étoile du Sahel	22	8	8	6	29	18	+11	46
7	Avenir Musulman	22	8	7	7	35	29	+6	45
8	CA Bizertin	22	7	7	8	25	28	−3	43
9	U. Sp. Tunisienne	22	7	3	12	30	38	−8	39
10	En Nadi Ahly Mateur	22	7	3	12	17	45	−28	39
11	Stade Soussien	22	2	8	12	12	33	−21	34
12	Union Sportive Monastir (R)	22	3	4	15	12	40	−28	32

Source: RSSSF
Rules for classification: 1) points (3 for a win, 2 for a draw, 1 for a defeat).
(C) = Champions; (R) = Relegated.
Note: At the end of the season, Avenir Musulman changed its name to Avenir Sportif de La Marsa. Stade Soussien won a play-off against Stade Sportif Sfaxien to avoid relegation.

== Top scorers ==
Mongi Dalhoum of CS Sfaxien was the league's top scorer with 15 goals.

== See also ==
- 1962–63 Tunisian National Championship
- 1964–65 Tunisian National Championship
- Tunisian Ligue Professionnelle 1
- Tunisian Cup
