= 1972–73 Tunisian National Championship =

Tunisian National Championship
- Season: 1972–73
- Champions: Club Africain
- Relegated: Union Sportive Maghrébine; Union Sportive Monastir
- Matches: 182
- Goals: 385 (2.12 per match)
- Top goalscorer: Ezzedine Chakroun (Sfax Railways Sports) (23 goals)

The 1972–73 Tunisian National Championship was the eighteenth season of the Tunisian national football championship following the country's independence in 1956. The competition was won by Club Africain, who finished 4 points ahead of Étoile Sportive du Sahel in the final standings. It was Club Africain's third league title since independence. The defending champions, Étoile du Sahel, finished second.

The league was contested by 14 clubs, each playing 26 matches. Union Sportive Maghrébine and Union Sportive Monastir finished level on 39 points at the bottom of the table and were relegated at the end of the campaign, while Club Sportif Cheminots and Stade Sportif Sfaxien were promoted for the following season.

== League table ==
Pos	Team	Pld	W	D	L	GF	GA	GD	Pts
1	Club Africain (C)	26	15	9	2	37	15	+22	65
2	Étoile du Sahel	26	15	5	6	49	29	+20	61
3	Espérance de Tunis	26	13	8	5	35	18	+17	60
4	Club Sportif Sfaxien	26	12	8	6	41	25	+16	58
5	Club Olympique des Transports	26	10	12	4	26	16	+10	58
6	CA Bizertin	26	10	7	9	21	26	−5	53
7	Sfax Railways Sports	26	8	9	9	32	27	+5	51
8	Avenir Sportif de La Marsa	26	7	10	9	24	30	−6	50
9	Stade Tunisien	26	8	8	10	21	28	−7	50
10	El Makarem de Mahdia	26	6	11	9	23	23	0	49
11	JS Kairouan	26	8	6	12	26	35	−9	48
12	CS Hammam-Lif	26	5	11	10	23	30	−7	47
13	Union Sportive Maghrébine (R)	26	3	7	16	17	51	−34	39
14	Union Sportive Monastir (R)	26	3	7	16	10	32	−22	39

Source: RSSSF
Rules for classification: 1) points (3 for a win, 2 for a draw, 1 for a defeat).
(C) = Champions; (R) = Relegated.

== Top scorers ==
Ezzedine Chakroun of Sfax Railways Sports was the league's top scorer with 23 goals.

== See also ==
- 1971–72 Tunisian National Championship
- 1973–74 Tunisian National Championship
- Tunisian Ligue Professionnelle 1
- Tunisian Cup
