= 1961–62 Tunisian National Championship =

Tunisian National Championship
- Season: 1961–62
- Champions: Stade Tunisien
- Relegated: CA Bizertin; El Makarem de Mahdia
- Matches: 132
- Goals: 322 (2.44 per match)
- Top goalscorer: Chedly Laaouini (Espérance de Tunis) (16 goals)

The 1961–62 Tunisian National Championship was the seventh season of the Tunisian national football championship following the country's independence in 1956. The competition was won by the defending champions Stade Tunisien, who finished ahead of Stade Soussien in the final standings. It was Stade Tunisien's third league title overall and their second in a row.

The league was contested by 12 clubs, each playing 22 matches. CA Bizertin and El Makarem de Mahdia were relegated at the end of the campaign, while En Nadi Ahly Mateur was promoted for the following season. Stade Gabésien and Union Sportive Monastir, promoted the previous season, both stayed up. RSSSF also notes the re-establishment of Étoile Sportive du Sahel during this period.

== League table ==
Pos	Team	Pld	W	D	L	GF	GA	GD	Pts
1	Stade Tunisien (C)	22	16	4	2	39	10	+29	58
2	Stade Soussien	22	15	4	3	39	12	+27	56
3	Espérance de Tunis	22	12	9	1	35	14	+21	55
4	Club Africain	22	10	6	6	32	22	+10	48
5	CS Hammam-Lif	22	5	10	7	28	28	0	42
6	U. Sp. Tunisienne	22	7	5	10	34	29	+5	41
7	Avenir Musulman	22	6	7	9	25	31	−6	41
8	Stade Gabésien	22	6	6	10	16	27	−11	40
9	Union Sportive Monastir	22	5	7	10	24	30	−6	39
10	Club Tunisien	22	5	7	10	21	29	−8	39
11	CA Bizertin (R)	22	5	7	10	18	30	−12	39
12	El Makarem de Mahdia (R)	22	2	4	16	11	60	−49	30

Source: RSSSF
Rules for classification: 1) points (3 for a win, 2 for a draw, 1 for a defeat); 2) goal difference.
(C) = Champions; (R) = Relegated.
Note: At the end of the season, Club Tunisien changed its name to CS Sfaxien.

== Top scorers ==
Chedly Laaouini of Espérance Sportive de Tunis was the league's top scorer with 16 goals.

== See also ==
- 1960–61 Tunisian National Championship
- 1962–63 Tunisian National Championship
- Tunisian Ligue Professionnelle 1
- Tunisian Cup
