= 1967–68 Tunisian National Championship =

Tunisian football league season

Tunisian National Championship
- Season: 1967–68
- Champions: Sfax Railways Sports
- Relegated: None
- Matches: 132
- Goals: 238 (1.8 per match)
- Top goalscorer: Kamel Henia (CS Hammam-Lif) (10 goals)

The 1967–68 Tunisian National Championship was the thirteenth season of the Tunisian national football championship following the country's independence in 1956. The competition was won by Sfax Railways Sports, who finished four points ahead of the defending champions Club Africain in the final standings. It was Sfax Railways Sports' first league title since independence.

The league was contested by 12 clubs, each playing 22 matches. There were no relegations this season, and Club Sportif Cheminots and Stade Sportif Sfaxien were promoted for the following season.

== League table ==
Pos	Team	Pld	W	D	L	GF	GA	GD	Pts
1	Sfax Railways Sports (C)	22	13	6	3	29	11	+18	54
2	Club Africain	22	9	10	3	26	14	+12	50
3	Stade Tunisien	22	7	9	6	20	19	+1	45
4	Étoile du Sahel	22	6	10	6	21	21	0	44
5	Club Sportif Sfaxien	22	6	10	6	17	20	−3	44
6	Club Olympique des Transports	22	8	5	9	18	21	−3	43
7	Espérance de Tunis	22	6	8	8	23	23	0	42
8	Avenir Sportif de La Marsa	22	4	12	6	24	28	−4	42
9	Union Sportive Maghrébine	22	5	9	8	17	21	−4	41
10	CS Hammam-Lif	22	6	7	9	20	26	−6	41
11	Union Sportive Monastir	22	4	11	7	13	17	−4	41
12	CA Bizertin	22	5	9	8	10	17	−7	41

Source: RSSSF
Rules for classification: 1) points (3 for a win, 2 for a draw, 1 for a defeat).
(C) = Champions.
Note: No team was relegated this season.

== Top scorers ==
Kamel Henia of CS Hammam-Lif was the league's top scorer with 10 goals.

== See also ==
- 1966–67 Tunisian National Championship
- 1968–69 Tunisian National Championship
- Tunisian Ligue Professionnelle 1
- Tunisian Cup
