= 1960–61 Tunisian National Championship =

Tunisian National Championship
- Season: 1960–61
- Champions: Stade Tunisien
- Relegated: Stade Populaire
- Matches: 110
- Goals: 291 (2.65 per match)
- Top goalscorer: Ammar Merrichkou (AS Marsa) (18 goals)

The 1960–61 Tunisian National Championship was the sixth season of the Tunisian national football championship following the country's independence in 1956. The competition was won by Stade Tunisien, who finished ahead of the defending champions Espérance Sportive de Tunis in the final standings. It was Stade Tunisien's second league title, after 1956–57.

The league was contested by 11 clubs, each playing 20 matches. Étoile Sportive du Sahel was dissolved and does not appear in the final table. El Makarem de Mahdia, promoted the previous season, took part, and Stade Populaire finished last and was relegated. Stade Gabésien and Union Sportive Monastir were promoted for the following season.

== League table ==
Pos	Team	Pld	W	D	L	GF	GA	GD	Pts
1	Stade Tunisien (C)	20	16	2	2	42	17	+25	54
2	Espérance de Tunis	20	14	3	3	48	14	+34	51
3	U. Sp. Tunisienne	20	11	3	6	36	29	+7	45
4	CS Hammam-Lif	20	9	4	7	27	21	+6	42
5	Avenir Musulman	20	9	4	7	34	29	+5	42
6	Stade Soussien	20	5	8	7	14	22	−8	38
7	Club Tunisien	20	5	6	9	18	33	−15	36
8	Club Africain	20	5	5	10	14	21	−7	35
9	CA Bizertin	20	3	7	10	20	29	−9	33
10	El Makarem de Mahdia	20	6	1	13	20	44	−24	33
11	Stade Populaire (R)	20	4	3	13	18	32	−14	31

Source: RSSSF
Rules for classification: 1) points (3 for a win, 2 for a draw, 1 for a defeat); 2) goal difference.
(C) = Champions; (R) = Relegated.
Note: Étoile Sportive du Sahel was dissolved and is not included in the table.

== Top scorers ==
Ammar Merrichkou of AS Marsa was the league's top scorer with 18 goals.

== See also ==
- 1959–60 Tunisian National Championship
- 1961–62 Tunisian National Championship
- Tunisian Ligue Professionnelle 1
- Tunisian Cup
