= 1964–65 Tunisian National Championship =

Tunisian National Championship
- Season: 1964–65
- Champions: Stade Tunisien
- Relegated: Union Sportive Tunisienne
- Matches: 132
- Goals: 326 (2.47 per match)
- Top goalscorer: Mohamed Salah Jedidi (Club Africain) (17 goals)

The 1964–65 Tunisian National Championship was the tenth season of the Tunisian national football championship following the country's independence in 1956. The competition was won by Stade Tunisien, who finished one point ahead of the defending champions Club Africain in the final standings. It was Stade Tunisien's fourth league title since independence.

The league was contested by 12 clubs, each playing 22 matches. Union Sportive Tunisienne finished bottom and was relegated, while Club Olympique des Transports was promoted for the following season.

== League table ==
Pos	Team	Pld	W	D	L	GF	GA	GD	Pts
1	Stade Tunisien (C)	22	14	6	2	41	16	+25	56
2	Club Africain	22	13	7	2	40	14	+26	55
3	Étoile du Sahel	22	10	7	5	37	19	+18	49
4	Avenir Sportif de La Marsa	22	10	7	5	32	27	+5	49
5	Club Sportif Sfaxien	22	9	7	6	28	24	+4	47
6	Espérance de Tunis	22	7	8	7	21	21	0	44
7	Sfax Railways Sports	22	6	9	7	22	24	−2	43
8	CA Bizertin	22	7	5	10	29	36	−7	41
9	CS Hammam-Lif	22	6	6	10	20	31	−11	40
10	Stade Soussien	22	5	5	12	19	31	−12	37
11	En Nadi Ahly Mateur	22	4	4	14	23	51	−28	34
12	U. Sp. Tunisienne (R)	22	2	7	13	14	32	−18	33

Source: RSSSF
Rules for classification: 1) points (3 for a win, 2 for a draw, 1 for a defeat).
(C) = Champions; (R) = Relegated.

== Top scorers ==
Mohamed Salah Jedidi of Club Africain was the league's top scorer with 17 goals.

== See also ==
- 1963–64 Tunisian National Championship
- 1965–66 Tunisian National Championship
- Tunisian Ligue Professionnelle 1
- Tunisian Cup
