= 1974–75 Tunisian National Championship =

Tunisian National Championship
- Season: 1974–75
- Champions: Espérance Sportive de Tunis
- Relegated: Stade Africain de Menzel Bourguiba; Patriote de Sousse
- Matches: 182
- Goals: 425 (2.34 per match)
- Top goalscorer: Zoubeir Boughnia (Espérance de Tunis) (24 goals)

The 1974–75 Tunisian National Championship was the twentieth season of the Tunisian national football championship following the country's independence in 1956. The competition was won by Espérance Sportive de Tunis, who finished 1 point ahead of Club Africain in the final standings. It was Espérance's fourth league title since independence. The defending champions, Club Africain, finished second.

The league was contested by 14 clubs, each playing 26 matches. Patriote de Sousse finished bottom and was relegated. Stade Africain de Menzel Bourguiba and El Makarem de Mahdia finished level on 45 points, and El Makarem won the play-off between the two, so Stade Africain was relegated alongside Patriote de Sousse. JS Kairouan and Olympique du Kef were promoted for the following season.

== League table ==
| Pos | Team | Pld | W | D | L | GF | GA | GD | Pts |
|---|---|---|---|---|---|---|---|---|---|
| 1 | Espérance de Tunis (C) | 26 | 16 | 6 | 4 | 44 | 18 | +26 | 64 |
| 2 | Club Africain | 26 | 14 | 9 | 3 | 41 | 16 | +25 | 63 |
| 3 | Étoile du Sahel | 26 | 14 | 7 | 5 | 36 | 20 | +16 | 61 |
| 4 | Stade Tunisien | 26 | 14 | 7 | 5 | 43 | 24 | +19 | 61 |
| 5 | Club Sportif Sfaxien | 26 | 10 | 9 | 7 | 31 | 27 | +4 | 55 |
| 6 | CA Bizertin | 26 | 9 | 8 | 9 | 24 | 23 | +1 | 52 |
| 7 | Club Olympique des Transports | 26 | 8 | 8 | 10 | 31 | 31 | 0 | 50 |
| 8 | Sfax Railways Sports | 26 | 7 | 10 | 9 | 28 | 33 | −5 | 50 |
| 9 | CS Hammam-Lif | 26 | 8 | 7 | 11 | 25 | 32 | −7 | 49 |
| 10 | Avenir Sportif de La Marsa | 26 | 7 | 8 | 11 | 31 | 36 | −5 | 48 |
| 11 | Club Sportif Cheminots | 26 | 7 | 6 | 13 | 23 | 44 | −21 | 46 |
| 12 | Stade Africain de Menzel Bourguiba (R) | 26 | 6 | 7 | 13 | 32 | 37 | −5 | 45 |
| 13 | El Makarem de Mahdia | 26 | 4 | 11 | 11 | 13 | 28 | −15 | 45 |
| 14 | Patriote de Sousse (R) | 26 | 2 | 9 | 15 | 23 | 56 | −33 | 39 |

Source: RSSSF
Rules for classification: 1) points (3 for a win, 2 for a draw, 1 for a defeat).
(C) = Champions; (R) = Relegated.
Note: Stade Africain de Menzel Bourguiba and El Makarem de Mahdia finished level on points; El Makarem won the play-off to stay up.

== Top scorers ==
Zoubeir Boughnia of Espérance de Tunis was the league's top scorer with 24 goals.

== See also ==
- 1973–74 Tunisian National Championship
- 1975–76 Tunisian National Championship
- Tunisian Ligue Professionnelle 1
- Tunisian Cup
