= Ahmed Mghirbi =

Tunisian footballer (1946–2021)

Personal information
- Date of birth: 17 June 1946
- Place of birth: Manouba, French Tunisia
- Date of death: 16 March 2021 (aged 74)
- Position: Sweeper

Youth career
- 1958–1965: Stade Tunisien

Senior career*
Years	Team	Apps	(Gls)
1965–1975	Stade Tunisien		

International career
1966–1972	Tunisia	34	(0)

Managerial career
- 1976: Stade Tunisien
- 1976–1977: Club sportif de Menzel Bouzelfa
- 1978–1979: Olympique Béja
- 1980–1986: Club sportif des cheminots
- 1988–1989: Olympique Béja
- 1989–1990: Club sportif des cheminots
- 1991–1992: Stade Tunisien
- 1995–1996: Stade Tunisien
- 2001: Olympique Béja
- 2003: Stade Tunisien
- * Club domestic league appearances and goals

Ahmed Mghirbi (Arabic: أحمد المغيربي; 17 June 1946 – 16 March 2021) was a Tunisian football player and coach.

== Club career ==
Born on 17 June 1946, in Manouba, Mghirbi began his career at Stade Tunisien as a centre-back; he played 256 matches between 1965 and 1975, scoring seven goals. Mghribi helped his team win the Tunisian Cup in 1966, and won the Golden Boot in 1971–72 as the league's top goalscorer.

== International career ==
Mghirbi played for the Tunisia national team. He made his debut against Yugoslavia in 1966, and played his last match against Algeria in 1972. Mighirbi played 34 international matches, winning silver at the 1971 Mediterranean Games.

== Managerial career ==
Mghribi coached several clubs, namely Stade Tunisien, Club sportif de Menzel Bouzelfa, Club sportif des cheminots, and Olympique Béja.

== Personal life ==
Mghirbi later served as an analyst for the television channel Nessma and Tunisian national programming.

== Death ==
On 16 March 2021, Mghibi died aged 74 after suffering from cancer for two years.

== Honours ==
=== Player ===
Stade Tunisien

- Tunisian Cup: 1966

Tunisia

- Mediterranean Games Silver Medal: 1971

Individual

- Tunisian National Championship Top Scorer: 1971–72

=== Coach ===
Stade Tunisien

- Tunisian Cup: 2003
