= 1962–63 Tunisian National Championship =

Tunisian National Championship
- Season: 1962–63
- Champions: Étoile Sportive du Sahel
- Relegated: CS Hammam-Lif; Stade Gabésien
- Matches: 132
- Goals: 360 (2.73 per match)
- Top goalscorer: Mokhtar Chelbi (AS Marsa) (16 goals)

The 1962–63 Tunisian National Championship was the eighth season of the Tunisian national football championship following the country's independence in 1956. The competition was won by Étoile Sportive du Sahel, who went through the season unbeaten and finished ahead of the defending champions Stade Tunisien in the final standings. It was Étoile du Sahel's second league title, after 1957–58.

The league was contested by 12 clubs, each playing 22 matches. Stade Gabésien finished bottom and was relegated, while CS Hammam-Lif, who finished 11th, lost a play-off against CA Bizertin and was relegated as well. Sfax Railways Sports and CA Bizertin were promoted for the following season.

== League table ==
Pos	Team	Pld	W	D	L	GF	GA	GD	Pts
1	Étoile du Sahel (C)	22	14	8	0	35	13	+22	58
2	Stade Tunisien	22	12	3	7	33	21	+12	49
3	Avenir Musulman	22	10	7	5	48	32	+16	49
4	Club Sportif Sfaxien	22	8	9	5	30	25	+5	47
5	Club Africain	22	8	8	6	24	16	+8	46
6	Stade Soussien	22	6	8	8	25	28	−3	42
7	Union Sportive Monastir	22	5	10	7	28	34	−6	42
8	U. Sp. Tunisienne	22	7	6	9	24	33	−9	42
9	En Nadi Ahly Mateur	22	7	6	9	25	39	−14	42
10	Espérance de Tunis	22	7	5	10	36	32	+4	41
11	CS Hammam-Lif (R)	22	8	3	11	33	36	−3	41
12	Stade Gabésien (R)	22	2	3	17	19	51	−32	29

Source: RSSSF
Rules for classification: 1) points (3 for a win, 2 for a draw, 1 for a defeat).
(C) = Champions; (R) = Relegated.
Note: CS Hammam-Lif lost a play-off against CA Bizertin.

== Top scorers ==
Mokhtar Chelbi of AS Marsa was the league's top scorer with 16 goals.

== See also ==
- 1961–62 Tunisian National Championship
- 1963–64 Tunisian National Championship
- Tunisian Ligue Professionnelle 1
- Tunisian Cup
