= 1997–98 Tunisian Ligue Professionnelle 1 =

Tunisian Ligue Professionnelle 1
- Season: 1997–98
- Champions: Espérance de Tunis
- Relegated: None
- Champions League: Espérance de Tunis
- Cup Winners' Cup: Club Africain
- CAF Cup: Étoile du Sahel; CS Sfaxien
- Matches: 182
- Goals: 399 (2.19 per match)
- Top goalscorer: Abdelkader Belhassen; Ziad Tlemçani (15 goals)
- Biggest home win: EST 5–0 JSK; CAB 5–0 CO Médenine; EST 5–0 OK
- Biggest away win: JSK 1–6 CS Hammam-Lif
- Highest scoring: JSK 1–6 CS Hammam-Lif; JSK 3–4 ST

The 1997–98 Tunisian Ligue Professionnelle 1 season was the 43rd season of top-tier football in Tunisia.

== Results ==
=== League table ===
Pos	Team	Pld	W	D	L	GF	GA	GD	Pts	Qualification or relegation
1	Espérance de Tunis	26	22	3	1	63	10	+53	69	Qualification to the 1999 CAF Champions League
2	Club Africain	26	17	8	1	39	15	+24	59	Qualification to the 1999 African Cup Winners' Cup
3	Étoile du Sahel	26	14	6	6	36	23	+13	48	Qualification to the 1999 CAF Cup
4	CS Sfaxien	26	12	9	5	32	12	+20	45	Qualification to the 1999 CAF Cup
5	Olympique Béja	26	9	7	10	20	30	−10	34	
6	AS Marsa	26	9	6	11	27	27	0	33	
7	CA Bizertin	26	7	9	10	24	27	−3	30	
8	CS Hammam-Lif	26	7	8	11	32	32	0	29 (Note: In the games between these three teams, CS Hammam-Lif got 8 points (GD +6), Stade Tunisien 8 (GD +2), and JS Kairouan 0. See the Result table below for more details.)	
9	Stade Tunisien	26	6	11	9	20	32	−12	29	
10	JS Kairouan	26	8	5	13	27	41	−14	29	
11	CO Médenine	26	7	7	12	25	37	−12	28	
12	ES Zarzis	26	6	8	12	20	32	−12	26	
13	CO Transports	26	5	10	11	21	34	−13	25	
14	Olympique du Kef	26	2	5	19	13	47	−34	11	

Updated to match(es) played on 19 April 1998. Source: Ligue 1
Rules for classification: 1) points; 2) goal difference; 3) number of goals scored.

=== Result table ===
Home \ Away	ASM	CA	CAB	COM	COT	CSHL	CSS	EST	ESZ	ESS	JSK	OB	OK	ST
AS Marsa	—	0–1	2–1	0–0	1–1	3–1	0–1	0–2	2–0	3–1	1–1	2–0	1–0	1–1
Club Africain	2–0	—	2–1	3–2	3–0	0–0	1–0	1–1	1–1	1–0	3–2	3–0	3–0	0–0
CA Bizertin	2–1	0–1	—	5–0	0–0	0–4	0–0	0–2	2–0	0–2	0–0	0–0	1–1	3–1
CO Médenine	1–0	1–2	0–0	—	1–1	1–0	2–1	0–1	2–0	2–2	1–0	3–0	1–2	0–1
CO Transports	1–1	1–1	1–0	3–2	—	1–0	1–2	1–3	0–0	0–0	2–1	0–0	1–0	0–0
CS Hammam-Lif	2–2	0–1	0–0	1–0	3–2	—	0–2	0–3	1–1	1–1	3–2	2–0	4–0	0–0
CS Sfaxien	1–0	0–0	1–2	1–1	2–0	0–0	—	0–0	2–0	1–2	4–0	2–0	3–0	3–0
ES Tunis	2–0	1–2	3–0	2–0	4–1	2–1	0–0	—	2–0	2–0	5–0	3–1	5–0	3–1
ES Zarzis	3–0	1–1	0–1	0–0	1–0	3–1	1–4	0–3	—	0–0	0–1	1–2	3–0	0–0
Étoile du Sahel	2–1	0–1	3–2	3–1	2–1	1–0	1–0	0–1	3–0	—	3–2	2–1	3–1	2–0
JS Kairouan	0–1	2–0	0–0	3–0	2–1	1–6	0–0	1–3	2–1	1–0	—	1–2	1–0	3–4
Olympique Béja	1–0	1–1	1–3	3–0	2–0	1–0	1–1	0–3	0–0	0–2	0–0	—	2–1	0–0
Olympique du Kef	0–2	1–4	1–1	1–2	1–1	3–0	0–1	0–3	1–2	0–0	0–1	0–1	—	0–0
Stade Tunisien	0–3	0–1	1–0	2–2	2–1	2–2	0–0	1–4	1–2	1–1	1–0	0–1	1–0	—

Updated to match(es) played on 19 April 1998. Source: Ligue 1
Legend: Blue = home team win; Yellow = draw; Red = away team win.
