= Abdelmajid Tlemçani =

Tunisian footballer (1937–2020)

Personal information
- Date of birth: 30 November 1937
- Date of death: 8 July 2020 (aged 82)
- Position: Forward

Senior career*
Years	Team	Apps	(Gls)
- Espérance Sportive de Tunis

International career
	Tunisia		(54)
- * Club domestic league appearances and goals

Abdelmajid Tlemçani (30 November 1937 – 8 July 2020) was a Tunisian footballer who played as a forward.

== Biography ==
Born in 1937, Tlemçani played for Espérance Sportive de Tunis and the Tunisia national team. He is the father of footballer Ziad Tlemçani.

Tlemçani scored the highest number of goals in the Tunisian League twice, with 32 in 1959 and 22 in 1960.

He died on 8 July 2020 and was buried in Jellaz Cemetery the same day.
