= 1987–88 Tunisian National Championship =

Tunisian National Championship
- Season: 1987–88
- Champions: Espérance Sportive de Tunis
- Relegated: CS Hammam-Lif; Olympique du Kef; Grombalia Sports
- Matches: 182
- Goals: 357 (1.96 per match)
- Top goalscorer: Nabil Maâloul (Espérance de Tunis) (14 goals)

The 1987–88 Tunisian National Championship was the thirty-third season of the Tunisian national football championship following the country's independence in 1956. The competition was won by Espérance Sportive de Tunis, who finished level on 81 points with Club Olympique des Transports and won the title on their head-to-head record against them. It was Espérance's eighth league title since independence. The defending champions, Étoile Sportive du Sahel, finished fifth.

The league was contested by 14 clubs, each playing 26 matches. Olympique du Kef and Grombalia Sports finished at the bottom and were relegated. CS Hammam-Lif, who finished 12th, lost a play-off against Sfax Railways Sports and were relegated as well. Avenir Sportif de La Marsa, Océano Club de Kerkennah and Sfax Railways Sports were promoted for the following season.

== League table ==
Pos	Team	Pld	W	D	L	GF	GA	GD	Pts
1	Espérance de Tunis (C)	26	15	10	1	48	13	+35	81
2	Club Olympique des Transports	26	16	7	3	32	12	+20	81
3	Club Africain	26	12	11	3	38	17	+21	73
4	Stade Tunisien	26	11	6	9	33	21	+12	65
5	Étoile du Sahel	26	10	8	8	22	19	+3	64
6	Club Sportif Sfaxien	26	9	9	8	25	22	+3	62
7	JS Kairouan	26	8	8	10	32	28	+4	58
8	Avenir Sportif de Kasserine	26	8	7	11	22	33	−11	57
9	Union Sportive Monastir	26	7	9	10	16	25	−9	56
10	Olympique de Béja	26	8	6	12	22	32	−10	56
11	CA Bizertin	26	7	8	11	23	30	−7	55
12	CS Hammam-Lif (R)	26	5	13	8	17	22	−5	54
13	Olympique du Kef (R)	26	5	10	11	19	39	−20	51
14	Grombalia Sports (R)	26	2	6	18	8	44	−36	38

Source: RSSSF
Rules for classification: 1) points (4 for a win, 2 for a draw, 1 for a defeat). 2) head-to-head record.
(C) = Champions; (R) = Relegated.
Note: Espérance Sportive de Tunis and Club Olympique des Transports finished level on 81 points; RSSSF's tie-break data shows Espérance ahead on head-to-head results.
Note: CS Hammam-Lif lost a play-off against Sfax Railways Sports (0–2 and 2–1 in RSSSF's score line) and were relegated.

== Top scorers ==
Nabil Maâloul of Espérance de Tunis was the league's top scorer with 14 goals.

== See also ==
- 1986–87 Tunisian National Championship
- 1988–89 Tunisian National Championship
- Tunisian Ligue Professionnelle 1
- Tunisian Cup
