= 1996–97 Tunisian Ligue Professionnelle 1 =

Tunisian Ligue Professionnelle 1
- Season: 1996–97
- Champions: Étoile du Sahel
- Relegated: OC Kerkennah; Stade Soussien
- Champions League: Étoile du Sahel
- Cup Winners' Cup: Espérance de Tunis
- CAF Cup: CS Sfaxien
- Matches: 182
- Goals: 402 (2.21 per match)
- Top goalscorer: Sami Lâaroussi (14 goals)
- Biggest home win: EST 6–0 OK
- Biggest away win: COT 1–5 EST
- Highest scoring: CA 4–3 Stade Soussien; Stade Soussien 3–4 ST

The 1996–97 Tunisian Ligue Professionnelle 1 season was the 42nd season of top-tier football in Tunisia.

Étoile du Sahel finished the season as champions.

== Results ==
=== League table ===
Pos	Team	Pld	W	D	L	GF	GA	GD	Pts	Qualification or relegation
1	Étoile du Sahel	26	20	4	2	45	16	+29	64	Qualification to the 1998 CAF Champions League
2	Espérance de Tunis	26	18	7	1	53	15	+38	61	Qualification to the 1998 African Cup Winners' Cup
3	CS Sfaxien	26	13	6	7	27	19	+8	45	Qualification to the 1998 CAF Cup
4	CA Bizertin	26	11	10	5	25	16	+9	43	
5	Club Africain	26	11	8	7	34	27	+7	41	
6	Olympique Béja	26	10	7	9	38	30	+8	37	
7	AS Marsa	26	10	7	9	28	23	+5	37	
8	Stade Tunisien	26	8	10	8	28	30	−2	34	
9	JS Kairouan	26	7	10	9	22	26	−4	31	
10	Olympique du Kef	26	6	10	10	25	39	−14	28	
11	ES Zarzis	26	6	8	12	17	26	−9	26	
12	CO Transports	26	4	8	14	23	49	−26	20	
13	Océano Club de Kerkennah	26	3	5	18	13	37	−24	14	Relegation to the Tunisian Ligue Professionnelle 2
14	Stade Soussien	26	1	8	17	24	49	−25	11	Relegation to the Tunisian Ligue Professionnelle 2

Source: RSSSF
Rules for classification: 1) points; 2) goal difference; 3) number of goals scored.

=== Result table ===
Home \ Away	ASM	CA	CAB	COT	CSS	EST	ESZ	ESS	JSK	OCK	OB	OK	SS	ST
AS Marsa	—	4–1	0–0	3–0	2–0	0–0	0–1	1–2	2–0	1–0	3–1	3–1	1–0	0–0
Club Africain	1–0	—	0–0	3–0	1–1	0–2	2–0	2–1	1–1	3–0	2–1	1–1	4–3	4–1
CA Bizertin	2–0	0–1	—	1–1	1–0	0–1	1–0	2–1	0–0	1–0	2–2	3–2	2–0	1–0
CO Transports	0–1	1–1	2–2	—	2–1	1–5	2–2	0–1	1–1	2–1	1–1	1–2	0–0	1–0
CS Sfaxien	0–0	2–0	0–0	2–1	—	0–0	1–0	1–2	1–0	2–0	2–1	1–0	1–0	2–0
Espérance de Tunis	3–1	1–0	2–1	3–1	2–0	—	2–0	0–3	4–1	4–0	2–0	6–0	3–0	2–1
ES Zarzis	0–0	2–0	0–1	4–1	1–0	0–0	—	0–0	2–1	0–0	1–1	0–0	1–1	0–1
Étoile du Sahel	3–2	2–1	1–0	4–0	1–0	0–0	2–1	—	2–0	1–0	1–0	3–1	3–1	4–2
JS Kairouan	1–0	1–1	0–0	2–0	0–1	0–1	1–0	0–0	—	3–1	2–1	3–1	1–0	1–1
Océano Club de Kerkennah	0–1	0–1	0–2	2–2	0–2	1–2	1–0	0–1	0–0	—	0–0	3–0	3–0	0–0
Olympique Béja	3–1	1–0	1–0	3–0	1–2	3–3	3–0	1–2	1–0	2–0	—	1–0	3–1	1–2
Olympique du Kef	1–1	1–1	0–1	2–1	1–1	0–0	3–1	0–3	3–1	1–0	1–1	—	1–0	1–1
Stade Soussien	1–1	0–0	1–1	0–1	2–2	1–4	0–1	1–2	1–1	5–1	1–4	2–2	—	3–4
Stade Tunisien	2–0	1–3	1–1	2–1	1–2	1–1	2–0	0–0	1–1	1–0	1–1	0–0	2–0	—

Updated to match(es) played on 25 May 1997. Source: RSSSF
Legend: Blue = home team win; Yellow = draw; Red = away team win.
