= 2000–01 Tunisian Ligue Professionnelle 1 =

Tunisian Ligue Professionnelle 1
- Season: 2000–01
- Champions: Espérance de Tunis
- Relegated: AS Djerba; JS Kairouan
- Champions League: Espérance de Tunis
- Cup Winners' Cup: CS Hammam-Lif
- CAF Cup: Étoile du Sahel
- Matches: 132
- Goals: 296 (2.24 per match)
- Top goalscorer: Sallemi (11 goals)
- Biggest home win: CSS 5-0 ASD
- Biggest away win: JSK 1-4 CA
- Highest scoring: USM 4-3 ASD; JSK 3-4 CSHL; CSHL 4-3 ESZ

The 2000–01 Tunisian Ligue Professionnelle 1 season was the 46th season of top-tier football in Tunisia.

== Results ==
=== League table ===
Pos	Team	Pld	W	D	L	GF	GA	GD	Pts	Qualification or relegation
1	Espérance de Tunis	22	18	3	1	38	8	+30	57	Qualification to the 2002 CAF Champions League
2	Étoile du Sahel	22	10	8	4	25	15	+10	38	Qualification to the 2002 CAF Cup
3	Club Africain	22	9	9	4	28	18	+10	36	
4	CS Sfaxien	22	9	7	6	30	24	+6	34	
5	CS Hammam-Lif	22	8	9	5	25	27	−2	33	Qualification to the 2002 African Cup Winners' Cup
6	Stade Tunisien	22	8	6	8	32	28	+4	30	
7	US Monastir	22	7	6	9	26	28	−2	27	
8	ES Zarzis	22	7	4	11	19	29	−10	25	
9	CA Bizertin	22	6	6	10	15	19	−4	24	
10	Olympique Béja	22	5	8	9	16	23	−7	23	
11	AS Djerba	22	5	4	13	24	37	−13	19	Relegation to the Tunisian Ligue Professionnelle 2
12	JS Kairouan	22	2	6	14	18	40	−22	12	Relegation to the Tunisian Ligue Professionnelle 2

Updated to match(es) played on 25 April 2001. Source: Ligue 1
Rules for classification: 1) points; 2) goal difference; 3) number of goals scored.

=== Result table ===
Home \ Away	ASD	CA	CAB	CSHL	CSS	EST	ESZ	ESS	JSK	OB	ST	USM
AS Djerba	—	0–1	1–0	1–2	1–1	0–1	1–2	0–0	1–0	2–2	2–4	3–1
Club Africain	4–1	—	1–0	0–1	0–0	1–1	3–1	0–0	2–3	2–0	1–3	2–1
CA Bizertin	1–0	0–0	—	0–0	0–2	0–1	2–0	0–1	1–1	2–1	3–0	1–0
CS Hammam-Lif	1–0	1–1	1–1	—	1–1	0–1	4–3	0–0	1–0	0–0	3–1	1–3
CS Sfaxien	5–0	1–1	2–1	2–0	—	0–0	1–0	1–1	3–0	2–1	3–3	3–2
ES Tunis	0–2 (Note: Awarded 0–2 because Espérance de Tunis fielded more foreign players than allowed. The original score was 6–0.)	2–0	3–0	4–1	2–0	—	4–0	2–1	4–0	2–0	1–0	2–1
ES Zarzis	2–1	1–1	1–0	0–0	1–0	1–2	—	0–1	0–0	2–1	1–0	2–1
Étoile du Sahel	2–1	1–1	0–0	0–2	3–0	0–0	2–1	—	2–1	3–1	3–2	3–0
JS Kairouan	1–2	1–4	1–3	3–4	0–1	0–2	2–1	1–1	—	0–1	1–1	0–0
Olympique Béja	2–1	0–1	0–0	1–1	2–1	0–1	2–0	1–0	1–1	—	0–0	0–0
Stade Tunisien	1–1	0–2	2–0	5–1	2–0	0–1	1–0	1–0	3–1	0–0	—	2–3
US Monastir	4–3	0–0	1–0	0–0	3–1	1–2	0–0	0–1	2–1	2–0	1–1	—

Updated to match(es) played on 25 April 2001. Source: Ligue 1
Legend: Blue = home team win; Yellow = draw; Red = away team win.
