= 2003–04 Tunisian Ligue Professionnelle 1 =

Tunisian Ligue Professionnelle 1
- Season: 2003–04
- Champions: Espérance de Tunis
- Relegated: CO Transports
- Champions League: Espérance de Tunis; Étoile du Sahel
- Confederation Cup: AS Marsa
- Matches: 132
- Goals: 285 (2.16 per match)
- Top goalscorer: Haykel Guemamdia (10 goals)
- Biggest home win: ESS 5–0 USM
- Biggest away win: COT 0–4 CA; COT 0–4 USM
- Highest scoring: CSS 3–3 CAB; OB 3–3 CSS

The 2003–04 Tunisian Ligue Professionnelle 1 season was the 49th season of top-tier football in Tunisia.

== Results ==
=== League table ===
Pos	Team	Pld	W	D	L	GF	GA	GD	Pts	Qualification or relegation
1	Espérance de Tunis	22	17	2	3	38	13	+25	53	Qualification to the 2005 CAF Champions League
2	Étoile du Sahel	22	13	5	4	30	9	+21	44	Qualification to the 2005 CAF Champions League
3	Club Africain	22	11	9	2	32	15	+17	42	
4	CS Sfaxien	22	10	7	5	35	22	+13	37	
5	AS Marsa	22	11	3	8	27	25	+2	36	Qualification to the 2005 CAF Confederation Cup
6	Stade Tunisien	22	8	6	8	23	24	−1	30	
7	CS Hammam-Lif	22	9	3	10	21	25	−4	30	
8	CA Bizertin	22	7	7	8	23	25	−2	28	
9	US Monastir	22	6	5	11	22	29	−7	23	
10	Olympique Béja	22	2	10	10	13	27	−14	16	
11	ES Beni-Khalled	22	3	5	14	10	32	−22	14	
12	CO Transports	22	1	6	15	11	39	−28	9	Relegation to the Tunisian Ligue Professionnelle 2

Updated to match(es) played on 2 July 2004. Source: Ligue 1
Rules for classification: 1) points; 2) goal difference; 3) number of goals scored.

=== Result table ===
Home \ Away	ASM	CA	CAB	COT	CSHL	CSS	EST	ESBK	ESS	OB	ST	USM
AS Marsa	—	0–2	1–0	2–0	2–0	2–2	2–3	3–1	0–1	2–0	2–2	0–0
Club Africain	3–0	—	1–0	1–1	2–3	2–1	1–1	0–0	1–0	1–0	3–2	3–1
CA Bizertin	1–0	1–1	—	2–1	1–1	0–0	0–1	2–0	0–0	3–1	2–1	2–1
Club Olympique des Transports	1–2	0–4	0–0	—	0–1	0–0	0–3	1–2	0–2	2–1	0–3	0–4
CS Hammam-Lif	1–2	0–1	1–0	1–0	—	2–1	0–1	1–0	0–2	3–1	0–0	1–0
CS Sfaxien	2–0	1–1	3–3	2–0	2–1	—	1–0	2–0	1–2	1–1	4–0	2–0
ES Tunis	4–1	0–0	2–1	3–2	1–0	2–1	—	3–1	1–0	1–0	2–0	2–0
ES Beni-Khalled	0–2	0–3	1–2	0–0	2–1	0–2	0–3	—	0–1	1–1	1–0	0–2
Étoile du Sahel	1–0	1–1	3–0	1–1	3–0	0–1	2–1	1–0	—	2–0	2–0	5–0
Olympique Béja	1–2	1–1	1–1	1–0	0–0	3–3	0–2	0–0	0–0	—	0–0	1–0
Stade Tunisien	0–1	0–0	3–1	3–1	2–1	2–1	0–2	1–0	1–0	0–0	—	3–1
US Monastir	0–1	2–0	2–1	1–1	2–3	1–2	1–0	1–1	1–1	2–0	0–0	—

Updated to match(es) played on 2 July 2004. Source: Ligue 1
Legend: Blue = home team win; Yellow = draw; Red = away team win.
