= 2002–03 Tunisian Ligue Professionnelle 1 =

Tunisian Ligue Professionnelle 1
- Season: 2002–03
- Champions: Espérance de Tunis
- Relegated: AS Djerba; ES Zarzis
- Champions League: Espérance de Tunis; Étoile du Sahel
- Confederation Cup: Club Africain; Stade Tunisien
- Matches: 132
- Goals: 298 (2.26 per match)
- Top goalscorer: Mohamed Selliti (12 goals)
- Biggest home win: EST 6–0 CSHL
- Biggest away win: ESS 0–4 CSS
- Highest scoring: EST 4–3 USM

The 2002–03 Tunisian Ligue Professionnelle 1 season was the 48th season of top-tier football in Tunisia.

== Results ==
=== League table ===
Pos	Team	Pld	W	D	L	GF	GA	GD	Pts	Qualification or relegation
1	Espérance de Tunis	22	18	3	1	47	17	+30	57	Qualification to the 2004 CAF Champions League
2	Étoile du Sahel	22	11	5	6	32	18	+14	38	Qualification to the 2004 CAF Champions League
3	Club Africain	22	10	5	7	23	20	+3	35	Qualification to the 2004 CAF Confederation Cup
4	CS Sfaxien	22	8	7	7	28	23	+5	31	
5	Stade Tunisien	22	8	6	8	28	27	+1	30	Qualification to the 2004 CAF Confederation Cup
6	US Monastir	22	6	11	5	23	21	+2	29	
7	CS Hammam-Lif	22	8	5	9	24	28	−4	29	
8	CA Bizertin	22	7	7	8	21	22	−1	28	
9	AS Marsa	22	7	4	11	18	28	−10	25	
10	Olympique Béja	22	6	6	10	18	23	−5	24	
11	AS Djerba	22	5	3	14	21	41	−20	18	Relegation to the Tunisian Ligue Professionnelle 2
12	ES Zarzis	22	4	6	12	15	30	−15	18	Relegation to the Tunisian Ligue Professionnelle 2

Updated to match(es) played on 17 May 2003. Source: Ligue 1
Rules for classification: 1) points; 2) goal difference; 3) number of goals scored.

=== Result table ===
Home \ Away	ASD	ASM	CA	CAB	CSHL	CSS	EST	ESZ	ESS	OB	ST	USM
AS Djerba	—	1–2	0–1	2–2	3–0	1–2	1–4	1–0	1–1	1–1	1–2	2–1
AS Marsa	3–1	—	1–0	2–0	0–2	0–0	1–2	1–0	0–1	2–1	0–1	1–1
Club Africain	5–0	1–1	—	1–0	0–0	2–1	0–1	2–0	1–4	0–0	1–1	2–0
CA Bizertin	1–0	2–0	1–0	—	1–2	1–0	1–3	1–0	0–2	2–0	0–1	1–1
CS Hammam-Lif	2–0	1–2	0–1	2–1	—	1–2	1–2	3–0	0–2	0–0	2–2	1–1
CS Sfaxien	2–1	3–1	4–1	0–0	1–3	—	1–2	1–1	0–1	1–3	2–1	2–1
ES Tunis	3–0	1–0	2–0	1–0	6–0	2–1	—	1–1	2–1	3–1	3–1	4–3
ES Zarzis	3–2	1–0	0–1	2–2	1–0	0–0	1–2	—	2–3	2–1	1–1	0–0
Étoile du Sahel	3–0	3–0	1–2	0–0	0–1	0–4	0–0	4–0	—	2–0	0–1	2–2
Olympique Béja	0–1	1–0	2–0	1–1	1–0	0–0	1–1	1–0	0–1	—	3–0	0–1
Stade Tunisien	3–0	4–0	0–1	2–4	2–3	1–1	0–1	1–0	1–1	2–1	—	1–1
US Monastir	0–2	1–1	1–1	0–0	0–0	0–0	2–1	2–0	1–0	3–0	1–0	—

Updated to match(es) played on 17 May 2003. Source: Ligue 1
Legend: Blue = home team win; Yellow = draw; Red = away team win.
