= 1998–99 Tunisian Ligue Professionnelle 1 =

Tunisian Ligue Professionnelle 1
- Season: 1998–99
- Champions: Espérance de Tunis
- Relegated: Olympique du Kef; CS Hammam-Lif; CO Médenine; ES Beni-Khalled
- Champions League: Espérance de Tunis
- Cup Winners' Cup: Club Africain
- CAF Cup: CA Bizertin; Étoile du Sahel
- Matches: 224
- Goals: 512 (2.29 per match)
- Top goalscorer: Santos (14 goals)
- Biggest home win: OB 6–0 CO Médenine
- Biggest away win: CO Médenine 1–7 CAB
- Highest scoring: CO Médenine 1–7 CAB

The 1998–99 Tunisian Ligue Professionnelle 1 season was the 44th season of top-tier football in Tunisia.

== Results ==
=== Group A ===
==== Group A table ====
Pos	Team	Pld	W	D	L	GF	GA	GD	Pts	Qualification
1	Espérance de Tunis	14	8	6	0	29	12	+17	30	Qualification to the Championship Playoffs
2	CA Bizertin	14	6	5	3	23	13	+10	23	Qualification to the Championship Playoffs
3	US Monastir	14	5	7	2	21	20	+1	22	Qualification to the Championship Playoffs
4	Étoile du Sahel	14	5	5	4	13	12	+1	20	Qualification to the Championship Playoffs
5	CO Transports	14	4	5	5	15	14	+1	17	Qualification to the Relegation Playoffs
6	Olympique Béja	14	4	5	5	17	18	−1	17	Qualification to the Relegation Playoffs
7	Stade Tunisien	14	3	5	6	13	17	−4	14	Qualification to the Relegation Playoffs
8	CO Médenine	14	1	2	11	10	35	−25	5	Qualification to the Relegation Playoffs

Updated to match(es) played on 27 December 1998. Source: Ligue 1 Group A
Rules for classification: 1) points; 2) goal difference; 3) number of goals scored.

==== Group A result table ====
Home \ Away	CAB	COM	COT	EST	ESS	OB	ST	USM
CA Bizertin	—	4–1	0–0	0–0	2–0	2–1	2–0	1–1
CO Médenine	1–7	—	1–3	0–3	1–1	0–2	2–2	1–2
CO Transports	3–1	1–0	—	1–2	0–1	1–2	0–0	1–1
Espérance de Tunis	4–2	4–0	1–1	—	1–1	2–2	2–1	3–1
Étoile du Sahel	1–0	0–1	1–0	0–2	—	1–1	0–1	3–1
Olympique Béja	0–1	3–2	1–2	1–1	0–0	—	2–1	1–2
Stade Tunisien	0–0	2–0	1–1	0–2	0–2	2–0	—	1–1
US Monastir	1–1	1–0	2–1	2–2	2–2	1–1	3–2	—

Updated to match(es) played on 27 December 1998. Source: Ligue 1 Group A
Legend: Blue = home team win; Yellow = draw; Red = away team win.

=== Group B ===
==== Group B table ====
Pos	Team	Pld	W	D	L	GF	GA	GD	Pts	Qualification
1	Club Africain	14	10	3	1	23	7	+16	33	Qualification to the Championship Playoffs
2	CS Sfaxien	14	9	3	2	28	14	+14	30	Qualification to the Championship Playoffs
3	AS Marsa	14	7	2	5	15	16	−1	23	Qualification to the Championship Playoffs
4	ES Zarzis	14	4	7	3	14	12	+2	19	Qualification to the Championship Playoffs
5	CS Hammam-Lif	14	4	6	4	14	13	+1	18	Qualification to the Relegation Playoffs
6	ES Beni-Khalled	14	4	4	6	9	15	−6	16	Qualification to the Relegation Playoffs
7	JS Kairouan	14	1	4	9	9	23	−14	7	Qualification to the Relegation Playoffs
8	Olympique du Kef	14	1	3	10	5	17	−12	6	Qualification to the Relegation Playoffs

Updated to match(es) played on 27 December 1998. Source: Ligue 1 Group B
Rules for classification: 1) points; 2) goal difference; 3) number of goals scored.

==== Group B result table ====
Home \ Away	ASM	CA	CSHL	CSS	ESZ	ESBK	JSK	OK
AS Marsa	—	0–2	3–2	2–0	0–0	1–0	1–0	1–0
Club Africain	2–0	—	0–0	2–2	2–1	4–0	3–0	2–1
CS Hammam-Lif	2–0	0–2	—	2–2	1–1	0–0	3–0	1–0
CS Sfaxien	2–0	2–0	2–0	—	2–2	2–0	3–1	3–0
ES Zarzis	2–0	1–1	1–1	2–1	—	1–0	2–2	1–0
ES Beni-Khalled	2–2	0–1	1–0	1–2	1–0	—	1–0	2–1
JS Kairouan	1–2	0–1	1–1	2–3	1–0	1–1	—	0–0
Olympique du Kef	1–3	0–1	0–1	0–2	0–0	0–0	2–0	—

Updated to match(es) played on 27 December 1998. Source: Ligue 1 Group B
Legend: Blue = home team win; Yellow = draw; Red = away team win.

== Championship Playoffs ==
=== League table ===
Group winners (Espérance de Tunis and Club Africain) obtained 2 bonus points each and group runners-up (CA Bizertin and CS Sfaxien) obtained 1 bonus point each.

Pos	Team	Pld	W	D	L	GF	GA	GD	Pts	Qualification
1	Espérance de Tunis	14	11	3	0	31	8	+23	38	Qualification for 2000 CAF Champions League
2	CA Bizertin	14	6	6	2	18	14	+4	25	Qualification for 2000 CAF Cup
3	CS Sfaxien	14	7	2	5	15	12	+3	24	
4	Étoile du Sahel	14	5	5	4	18	13	+5	20	Qualification for 2000 CAF Cup
5	AS Marsa	14	5	3	6	11	13	−2	18	
6	Club Africain	14	4	3	7	13	20	−7	17	Qualification for 2000 African Cup Winners' Cup
7	US Monastir	14	1	7	6	13	21	−8	10	
8	ES Zarzis	14	2	1	11	9	27	−18	7	

Updated to match(es) played on 28 May 1999. Source: Ligue 1 Championship Playoffs
Rules for classification: 1) points; 2) goal difference; 3) number of goals scored.

=== Result table ===
Home \ Away	ASM	CA	CAB	CSS	EST	ESZ	ESS	USM
AS Marsa	—	2–0	0–0	1–0	0–2	2–0	1–2	0–0
Club Africain	1–2	—	0–0	1–0	0–1	1–0	2–2	4–2
CA Bizertin	1–0	3–2	—	2–0	1–1	2–0	0–2	2–2
CS Sfaxien	2–0	1–0	0–2	—	0–0	3–1	1–0	2–0
Espérance de Tunis	2–0	4–0	4–1	2–1	—	5–0	2–1	2–1
ES Zarzis	1–3	2–0	0–1	2–3	0–1	—	2–0	0–1
Étoile du Sahel	2–0	1–1	1–1	0–1	1–1	4–0	—	1–1
US Monastir	0–0	0–1	2–2	1–1	2–4	1–1	0–1	—

Updated to match(es) played on 28 May 1999. Source: Ligue 1 Championship Playoffs
Legend: Blue = home team win; Yellow = draw; Red = away team win.

== Relegation Playoffs ==
=== Relegation playoffs table ===
Teams that finished the regular season in the 5th place of each group (CO Transports and CS Hammam-Lif) obtained 2 bonus points each and those that finished in the 6th place of each group (Olympique Béja and ES Beni-Khalled) obtained 1 bonus point each.

Pos	Team	Pld	W	D	L	GF	GA	GD	Pts	Relegation
1	Olympique Béja	14	8	3	3	21	8	+13	28	
2	JS Kairouan	14	8	3	3	18	10	+8	27	
3	CO Transports	14	7	3	4	17	9	+8	26	
4	Stade Tunisien	14	7	3	4	19	12	+7	24	
5	Olympique du Kef	14	8	0	6	15	10	+5	24	Relegation to Tunisian Ligue Professionnelle 2
6	CS Hammam-Lif	14	6	1	7	18	18	0	21	Relegation to Tunisian Ligue Professionnelle 2
7	CO Médenine	14	3	2	9	10	29	−19	11	Relegation to Tunisian Ligue Professionnelle 2
8	ES Beni-Khalled	14	1	1	12	8	30	−22	5	Relegation to Tunisian Ligue Professionnelle 2

Updated to match(es) played on 30 May 1999. Source: Ligue 1 Relegation Playoffs
Rules for classification: 1) points; 2) goal difference; 3) number of goals scored.

=== Relegation playoffs result table ===
Home \ Away	COM	COT	CSHL	ESBK	JSK	OB	OK	ST
CO Médenine	—	3–2	1–2	1–0	0–1	0–2	1–0	2–5
CO Transports	3–0	—	1–0	5–0	1–0	1–0	1–0	0–2
CS Hammam-Lif	1–1	0–1	—	4–0	1–3	1–2	1–0	2–1
ES Beni-Khalled	3–1	1–1	0–2	—	0–2	0–2	1–2	1–2
JS Kairouan	2–0	1–1	3–0	2–1	—	0–0	1–0	2–1
Olympique Béja	6–0	1–0	2–1	3–0	1–1	—	1–0	1–1
Olympique du Kef	2–0	1–0	2–1	2–1	3–0	1–0	—	2–1
Stade Tunisien	0–0	0–0	1–2	1–0	1–0	2–0	1–0	—

Updated to match(es) played on 30 May 1999. Source: Ligue 1 Championship Playoffs
Legend: Blue = home team win; Yellow = draw; Red = away team win.
