= 1993–94 Tunisian National Championship =

Tunisian National Championship
- Season: 1993–94
- Champions: Espérance de Tunis
- Relegated: ES Beni-Khalled; US Monastir
- Cup of Champions: Espérance de Tunis
- Cup Winners' Cup: AS Marsa
- CAF Cup: Étoile du Sahel
- Matches: 182
- Goals: 431 (2.37 per match)
- Top goalscorer: Kenneth Malitoli (14 goals)
- Biggest home win: CA 6–0 ESBK
- Biggest away win: ESBK 1–5 EST
- Highest scoring: ASM 6–1 ESBK; OCK 4–3 USM

The 1993–94 Tunisian National Championship season was the 39th season of top-tier football in Tunisia.

== Results ==
=== League table ===
Pos	Team	Pld	W	D	L	GF	GA	GD	Pts	Qualification or relegation
1	Espérance de Tunis	26	19	5	2	52	12	+40	43	Qualification to the 1995 African Cup of Champions Clubs
2	Étoile du Sahel	26	13	8	5	36	17	+19	34	Qualification to the 1995 CAF Cup
3	Club Africain	26	14	5	7	47	28	+19	33	
4	AS Marsa	26	12	7	7	37	24	+13	31	Qualification to the 1995 African Cup Winners' Cup
5	CS Sfaxien	26	11	9	6	36	33	+3	31	
6	CA Bizertin	26	10	6	10	31	29	+2	26	
7	Stade Tunisien	26	10	4	12	30	32	−2	24	
8	Olympique Béja	26	7	10	9	21	24	−3	24	
9	JS Kairouanaise	26	8	7	11	29	39	−10	23	
10	Océano Club de Kerkennah	26	7	7	12	34	46	−12	21	
11	CS Hammam-Lif	26	7	6	13	12	24	−12	20	
12	Olympique du Kef	26	7	6	13	22	36	−14	20	
13	ES Beni-Khalled	26	5	7	14	21	44	−23	17	Relegation to the Ligue 2
14	US Monastir	26	5	7	14	23	43	−20	17	Relegation to the Ligue 2

Source: Championnat National
Rules for classification: 1) points; 2) goal difference; 3) number of goals scored.

=== Result table ===
Home \ Away	ASM	CA	CAB	CSHL	CSS	EST	ESBK	ESS	JSK	OCK	OB	OK	ST	USM
AS Marsa	—	2–1	1–2	1–0	4–0	0–2	6–1	0–0	1–0	3–1	1–1	2–1	2–0	2–0
Club Africain	2–0	—	1–2	3–0	4–1	2–2	6–0	1–1	2–0	3–1	3–2	4–0	1–2	3–2
CA Bizertin	0–0	0–0	—	0–1	0–0	0–1	3–0	0–3	4–0	0–1	1–0	3–0	2–3	4–1
CS Hammam-Lif	1–0	0–1	0–2	—	1–2	0–3	0–0	1–2	0–0	2–0	0–0	1–0	0–1	0–0
CS Sfaxien	1–0	1–1	2–1	1–0	—	0–0	3–2	0–0	1–0	2–2	2–1	2–1	2–2	3–1
Espérance de Tunis	1–2	2–0	4–1	1–0	2–1	—	2–0	1–0	5–1	4–0	3–0	3–0	0–1	3–0
ES Beni-Khalled	1–0	0–1	0–0	0–1	1–1	1–5	—	0–0	1–2	0–1	1–0	0–0	1–0	2–0
Étoile du Sahel	2–2	1–0	4–0	1–0	1–1	0–2	2–1	—	2–1	5–0	1–1	3–0	2–1	1–0
JS Kairouan	3–0	2–3	1–1	1–1	2–1	1–2	3–2	1–0	—	3–1	0–0	1–0	1–1	3–1
Océano Club de Kerkennah	1–1	4–0	3–1	0–2	1–4	0–0	3–3	1–1	1–1	—	3–0	3–1	1–2	4–3
Olympique Béja	1–1	2–0	0–1	0–0	2–0	1–1	1–0	2–1	1–1	2–1	—	0–0	0–1	0–1
Olympique du Kef	1–3	0–0	1–1	2–0	1–1	0–1	2–1	1–0	2–1	2–1	0–1	—	3–1	2–0
Stade Tunisien	0–2	1–2	0–2	3–0	3–2	0–1	0–1	0–2	5–0	0–0	0–2	1–0	—	1–1
US Monastir	1–1	0–3	2–0	0–1	0–2	1–1	2–2	0–1	1–0	1–0	1–1	2–2	2–1	—

Source: Championnat National
Legend: Blue = home team win; Yellow = draw; Red = away team win.
