= 1999–2000 Tunisian Ligue Professionnelle 1 =

Tunisian Ligue Professionnelle 1
- Season: 1999–2000
- Champions: Espérance de Tunis
- Relegated: CO Transports; AS Marsa
- Champions League: Espérance de Tunis
- Cup Winners' Cup: Club Africain
- CAF Cup: Étoile du Sahel
- Matches: 132
- Goals: 304 (2.3 per match)
- Top goalscorer: Ali Zitouni (19 goals)
- Biggest home win: OB 5-0 ESZ; EST 5-0 ASM; ESS 5-0 JSK
- Biggest away win: CSS 0-4 EST; USM 0-4 EST; OB 0-4 ST
- Highest scoring: COT 2-5 ASM

The 1999–2000 Tunisian Ligue Professionnelle 1 season was the 45th season of top-tier football in Tunisia.

== Results ==
=== League table ===
Pos	Team	Pld	W	D	L	GF	GA	GD	Pts	Qualification or relegation
1	Espérance de Tunis	22	19	3	0	53	7	+46	60	Qualification to the 2001 CAF Champions League
2	Étoile du Sahel	22	17	2	3	45	13	+32	53	Qualification to the 2001 CAF Cup
3	CS Sfaxien	22	9	8	5	23	22	+1	35	
4	JS Kairouan	22	7	8	7	18	19	−1	29	
5	Club Africain	22	7	6	9	20	21	−1	27 (Note: Club Africain ahead on head-to-head record: Club Africain 5–1 Stade Tunisien (week 1), Stade Tunisien 0–1 Club Africain (week 12))	Qualification to the 2001 African Cup Winners' Cup
6	Stade Tunisien	22	8	3	11	25	32	−7	27	
7	Olympique Béja	22	7	4	11	21	26	−5	25	
8	US Monastir	22	6	5	11	20	40	−20	23 (Note: In the games between these four teams, US Monastir got 10 points, ES Zarzis 9, CA Bizertin 8 and CO Transports 6. See the Result table below for more details.)	
9	ES Zarzis	22	5	8	9	17	31	−14	23	
10	CA Bizertin	22	5	8	9	24	27	−3	23	
11	CO Transports	22	7	2	13	17	26	−9	23	Relegation to the Tunisian Ligue Professionnelle 2
12	AS Marsa	22	3	7	12	21	40	−19	16	Relegation to the Tunisian Ligue Professionnelle 2

Updated to match(es) played on 3 June 2000. Source: Ligue 1
Rules for classification: 1) points; 2) goal difference; 3) number of goals scored.

=== Result table ===
Home \ Away	ASM	CA	CAB	COT	CSS	EST	ESZ	ESS	JSK	OB	ST	USM
AS Marsa	—	0–2	2–2	2–0	2–2	1–4	2–0	0–2	0–1	1–2	1–3	0–1
Club Africain	0–0	—	1–1	0–0	1–1	1–2	1–0	0–1	0–2	3–0	5–1	3–0
CA Bizertin	1–1	2–0	—	2–1	1–1	0–2	0–0	1–2	2–2	0–2	3–0	4–0
Club Olympique des Transports	2–5	2–0	2–1	—	1–0	0–2	1–2	3–1	1–0	0–1	0–1	1–2
CS Sfaxien	2–2	2–0	1–0	1–0	—	0–4	0–0	1–1	1–0	1–0	2–0	2–2
ES Tunis	5–0	4–0	1–0	2–0	2–0	—	1–1	3–1	4–0	2–0	1–0	2–0
ES Zarzis	1–0	2–1	2–2	1–0	1–1	0–1	—	1–2	1–1	1–0	1–1	1–1
Étoile du Sahel	4–0	1–0	3–0	2–1	3–1	0–0	1–0	—	5–0	1–0	3–0	4–0
JS Kairouan	0–0	0–0	0–1	0–0	0–1	0–0	3–0	1–0	—	3–1	2–0	3–1
Olympique Béja	2–0	0–0	0–0	1–0	1–0	2–3	5–0	1–2	0–0	—	0–4	2–2
Stade Tunisien	3–1	0–1	2–0	0–1	0–1	1–4	4–2	0–3	0–0	1–0	—	1–1
US Monastir	1–1	0–1	2–1	0–1	1–2	0–4	3–0	0–3	1–0	2–1	0–3	—

Updated to match(es) played on 3 June 2000. Source: Ligue 1
Legend: Blue = home team win; Yellow = draw; Red = away team win.
