= 1966–67 Tunisian National Championship =

Tunisian National Championship
- Season: 1966–67
- Champions: Club Africain
- Relegated: Stade Soussien; Club Sportif Cheminots
- Matches: 132
- Goals: 304 (2.3 per match)
- Top goalscorer: Abdelwahab Lahmar (Stade Tunisien) (14 goals)

The 1966–67 Tunisian National Championship was the twelfth season of the Tunisian national football championship following the country's independence in 1956. The competition was won by Club Africain, who lost only one match and finished eight points ahead of the defending champions Étoile Sportive du Sahel in the final standings. It was Club Africain's second league title since independence, after 1963–64.

The league was contested by 12 clubs, each playing 22 matches. Stade Soussien and Club Sportif Cheminots were relegated at the end of the campaign, while Club Olympique des Transports and Union Sportive Maghrébine were promoted for the following season.

== League table ==
Pos	Team	Pld	W	D	L	GF	GA	GD	Pts
1	Club Africain (C)	22	15	6	1	38	10	+28	58
2	Étoile du Sahel	22	10	8	4	33	17	+16	50
3	Stade Tunisien	22	11	6	5	30	19	+11	50
4	Sfax Railways Sports	22	11	6	5	23	14	+9	50
5	Avenir Sportif de La Marsa	22	10	7	5	33	19	+14	49
6	Club Sportif Sfaxien	22	10	4	8	28	27	+1	46
7	Espérance de Tunis	22	8	7	7	33	23	+10	45
8	CA Bizertin	22	7	8	7	16	23	−7	44
9	Union Sportive Monastir	22	6	4	12	24	41	−17	38
10	CS Hammam-Lif	22	5	5	12	16	35	−19	37
11	Stade Soussien (R)	22	3	4	15	17	34	−17	32
12	Club Sportif Cheminots (R)	22	3	1	18	13	42	−29	29

Source: RSSSF
Rules for classification: 1) points (3 for a win, 2 for a draw, 1 for a defeat).
(C) = Champions; (R) = Relegated.

== Top scorers ==
Abdelwahab Lahmar of Stade Tunisien was the league's top scorer with 14 goals.

== See also ==
- 1965–66 Tunisian National Championship
- 1967–68 Tunisian National Championship
- Tunisian Ligue Professionnelle 1
- Tunisian Cup
