= 1965–66 Tunisian National Championship =

Tunisian National Championship
- Season: 1965–66
- Champions: Étoile Sportive du Sahel
- Relegated: Club Olympique des Transports; En Nadi Ahly Mateur
- Matches: 132
- Goals: 324 (2.45 per match)
- Top goalscorer: Mongi Dalhoum (CS Sfaxien) (18 goals)

The 1965–66 Tunisian National Championship was the eleventh season of the Tunisian national football championship following the country's independence in 1956. The competition was won by Étoile Sportive du Sahel, who lost only one match and finished nine points ahead of Club Sportif Sfaxien in the final standings. It was Étoile du Sahel's third league title since independence. The defending champions, Stade Tunisien, finished fourth.

The league was contested by 12 clubs, each playing 22 matches. Club Olympique des Transports and En Nadi Ahly Mateur were relegated at the end of the campaign, while Club Sportif Cheminots and Union Sportive Monastir were promoted for the following season.

== League table ==
Pos	Team	Pld	W	D	L	GF	GA	GD	Pts
1	Étoile du Sahel (C)	22	15	6	1	53	19	+34	58
2	Club Sportif Sfaxien	22	11	5	6	39	23	+16	49
3	Avenir Sportif de La Marsa	22	9	8	5	34	23	+11	48
4	Stade Tunisien	22	10	6	6	31	21	+10	48
5	Espérance de Tunis	22	9	7	6	18	14	+4	47
6	Club Africain	22	5	13	4	27	22	+5	45
7	Sfax Railways Sports	22	9	4	9	27	26	+1	44
8	Stade Soussien	22	7	7	8	19	20	−1	43
9	CA Bizertin	22	6	7	9	23	25	−2	41
10	CS Hammam-Lif	22	6	7	9	16	24	−8	41
11	Club Olympique des Transports (R)	22	5	6	11	27	38	−11	38
12	En Nadi Ahly Mateur (R)	22	1	2	19	10	69	−59	26

Source: RSSSF
Rules for classification: 1) points (3 for a win, 2 for a draw, 1 for a defeat).
(C) = Champions; (R) = Relegated.
Note: At the end of the season, En Nadi Ahly Mateur changed its name to El Ahly Mateur.

== Top scorers ==
Mongi Dalhoum of CS Sfaxien was the league's top scorer with 18 goals, after also finishing top in 1963–64.

== See also ==
- 1964–65 Tunisian National Championship
- 1966–67 Tunisian National Championship
- Tunisian Ligue Professionnelle 1
- Tunisian Cup
