= 2004–05 Tunisian Ligue Professionnelle 1 =

Tunisian Ligue Professionnelle 1
- Season: 2004–05
- Champions: CS Sfaxien
- Relegated: ES Beni-Khalled; Olympique Béja
- Champions League: CS Sfaxien; Étoile du Sahel
- Confederation Cup: Espérance de Tunis; ES Zarzis
- Matches: 182
- Goals: 382 (2.1 per match)
- Top goalscorer: Haykel Guemamdia (12 goals)
- Biggest home win: CAB 5–0 EGSG; CA 5–0 ESBK
- Biggest away win: ESBK 0–5 CSS
- Highest scoring: EST 5–2 OB

The 2004–05 Tunisian Ligue Professionnelle 1 season was the 50th season of top-tier football in Tunisia.

== Results ==
=== League table ===
Pos	Team	Pld	W	D	L	GF	GA	GD	Pts	Qualification or relegation
1	CS Sfaxien	26	17	7	2	44	12	+32	58	Qualification to the 2006 CAF Champions League
2	Étoile du Sahel	26	17	7	2	38	11	+27	58	Qualification to the 2006 CAF Champions League
3	Club Africain	26	16	8	2	46	16	+30	56	
4	Espérance de Tunis	26	15	10	1	43	15	+28	55	Qualification to the 2006 CAF Confederation Cup
5	AS Marsa	26	10	3	13	21	22	−1	33	
6	EO Goulette et Kram	26	7	9	10	22	28	−6	30	
7	CA Bizertin	26	7	9	10	26	34	−8	30	
8	US Monastir	26	6	11	9	27	30	−3	29	
9	EGS Gafsa	26	6	9	11	22	33	−11	27	
10	Stade Tunisien	26	6	8	12	28	40	−12	26	
11	CS Hammam-Lif	26	6	7	13	19	31	−12	25	
12	ES Zarzis	26	5	9	12	17	26	−9	24	Qualification to the 2006 CAF Confederation Cup
13	ES Beni-Khalled	26	4	8	14	14	45	−31	20	Relegation to the Tunisian Ligue Professionnelle 2
14	Olympique Béja	26	3	9	14	15	39	−24	18	Relegation to the Tunisian Ligue Professionnelle 2

Updated to match(es) played on 15 May 2005. Source: Ligue 1
Rules for classification: 1) points; 2) goal difference; 3) number of goals scored.

=== Result table ===
Home \ Away	ASM	CA	CAB	CSHL	CSS	EGSG	EST	ESZ	EOGK	ESS	OB	ESBK	ST	USM
AS Marsa	—	1–2	0–0	0–1	0–2	0–1	0–1	2–0	0–1	0–1	1–0	2–1	3–1	1–1
Club Africain	3–0	—	3–2	2–1	1–1	5–1	2–2	1–0	1–0	1–0	2–0	5–0	4–0	2–1
CA Bizertin	1–0	0–2	—	2–2	2–1	5–0	1–2	0–2	3–3	0–0	1–0	0–0	1–0	1–1
CS Hammam-Lif	0–2	0–3	0–1	—	0–2	1–1	0–3	2–1	0–0	1–2	3–1	0–0	0–2	2–0
CS Sfaxien	1–0	0–0	1–0	0–0	—	2–0	0–0	2–1	3–1	2–0	2–0	2–0	0–0	2–0
EGS Gafsa	0–1	0–0	1–2	2–1	1–2	—	0–0	2–2	1–1	0–1	2–0	0–0	1–1	3–1
ES Tunis	1–0	1–1	3–0	0–0	1–2	1–1	—	3–1	3–1	0–0	5–2	4–0	3–2	2–1
ES Zarzis	0–1	1–0	3–1	0–1	1–1	1–1	0–2	—	0–0	0–2	0–0	1–0	2–0	0–0
EO Goulette et Kram	0–1	0–0	2–1	2–1	0–1	0–2	0–1	1–0	—	1–1	0–0	2–0	1–1	2–1
Étoile du Sahel	1–0	3–1	4–0	1–0	1–1	2–0	0–0	1–0	2–0	—	3–2	4–0	1–0	1–0
Olympique Béja	0–2	0–2	2–0	0–0	0–4	1–0	1–1	1–1	0–2	0–2	—	2–1	0–2	1–1
ES Beni-Khalled	0–0	0–1	0–0	2–0	0–5	0–1	0–3	0–0	1–0	1–1	2–2	—	2–1	2–1
Stade Tunisien	3–2	1–1	1–1	0–3	1–4	2–1	0–1	2–0	1–1	0–3	0–0	4–1	—	1–2
US Monastir	0–2	1–1	1–1	2–0	2–1	1–0	0–0	0–0	3–1	1–1	0–0	4–1	2–2	—

Updated to match(es) played on 15 May 2005. Source: Ligue 1
Legend: Blue = home team win; Yellow = draw; Red = away team win.

== Bibliography ==
- 2004–05 Ligue 1 on RSSSF.com
