= 1993 Arab Club Champions Cup =

بطولة الأندية العربية لأبطال الدوري 1993
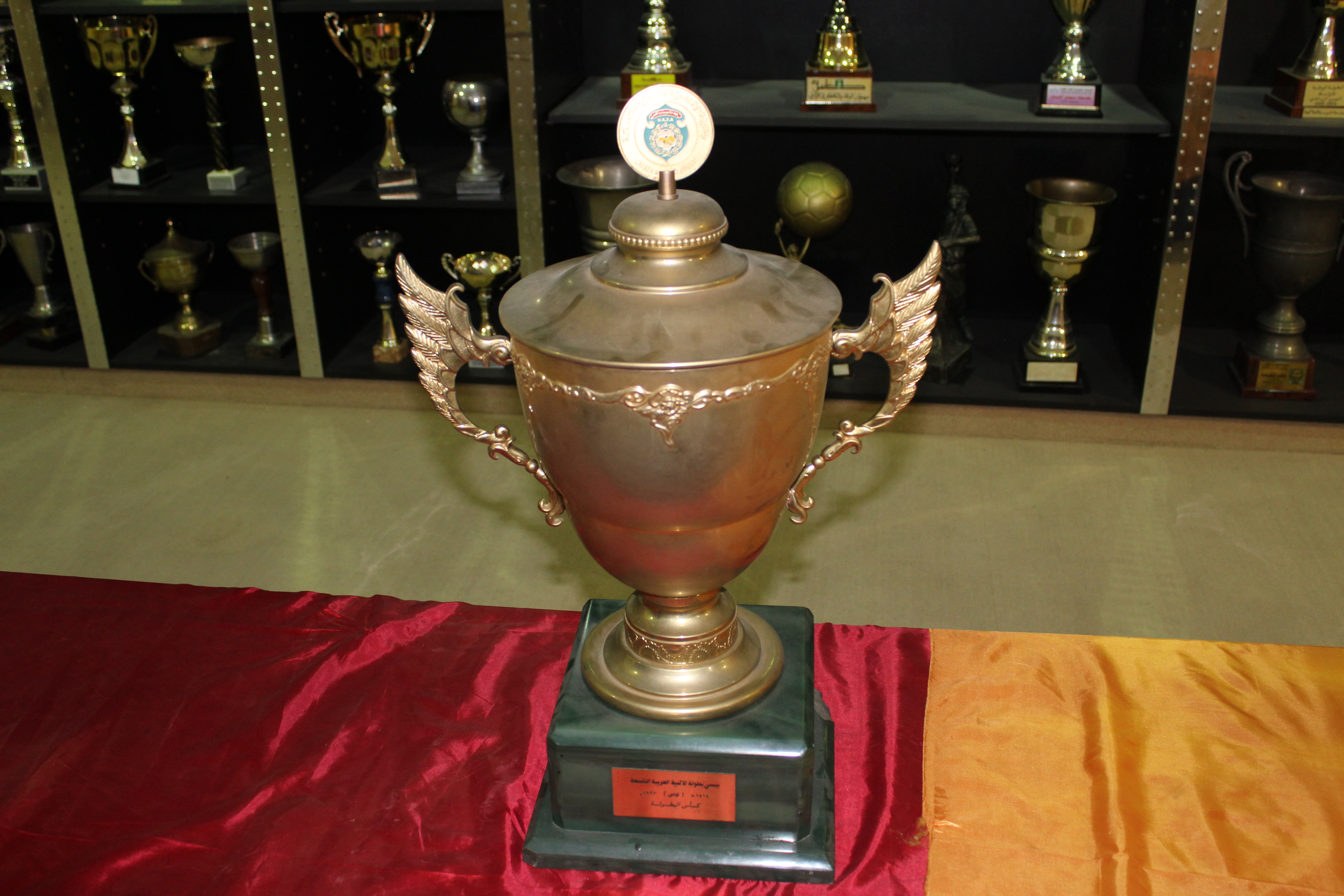
- 1993 Arab Club Champions Cup Trophy

Tournament details
- Host country: Tunisia
- City: Tunis
- Dates: 9–18 September
- Teams: 8 (from 2 confederations) (from 8 associations)
- Venue: (in 1 host city)

Final positions
- Champions: (Tunisia) Espérance de Tunis (1st title)
- Runners-up: (Bahrain) Al-Muharraq

Tournament statistics
- Matches played: 15
- Goals scored: 52 (3.47 per match)
- Top scorer: (Tunisia) Tarek Thabet
- Best player: (Tunisia) Nabil Maâloul
- Best goalkeeper: (Bahrain) Hamood Sultan
- Fair play award: (Saudi Arabia) Al-Ettifaq

The 1993 Arab Club Champions Cup was played in Tunisia in the city of Tunis. Espérance de Tunis won the championship for the first time beating Al-Muharraq in the final.

== Participants ==
Participants
Zone	Team	Qualifying method
	(Tunisia) Espérance de Tunis	Hosts
Zone 1	(Bahrain) Al-Muharraq	1991–92 Bahraini Premier League winners
Zone 1	(Kuwait) Al-Qadsia	1991–92 Kuwaiti League winners
Zone 2	(Saudi Arabia) Al-Ettifaq	1991–92 Saudi Premier League runners-up
Zone 2	(Sudan) Al-Hilal Club	1992–93 Sudan Premier League 3rd
Zone 3	(Algeria) WA Tlemcen	1991–92 Algerian Championnat National 3rd
Zone 4	(Jordan) Al-Hussein	1991–92 Jordan League 5th
Zone 4	(Palestine) Hilal Al-Quds	West Bank Premier League representative

== Final tournament ==
Final tournament held in Tunis, Tunisia from 9 to 18 February 1993.

=== Group stage ===
==== Group A ====
Team	Pld	W	D	L	GF	GA	GD	Pts
(Tunisia) Espérance de Tunis	3	3	0	0	10	0	+10	6
(Bahrain) Al-Muharraq	3	2	0	1	5	4	+1	4
(Jordan) Al-Hussein	3	1	0	2	3	6	−3	2
(Sudan) Al-Hilal Club	3	0	0	3	0	8	−8	0

9 February 1993

Espérance de Tunis (Tunisia)	2 – 0	(Bahrain) Al-Muharraq

Tunis

Al-Hussein (Jordan)	1 – 0	(Sudan) Al-Hilal

Tunis

Espérance de Tunis (Tunisia)	2 – 0	(Jordan) Al-Hussein

Tunis

Al-Muharraq (Bahrain)	1 – 0	(Sudan) Al-Hilal

Tunis

Espérance de Tunis (Tunisia)	6 – 0	(Sudan) Al-Hilal

Tunis

Al-Muharraq (Bahrain)	4 – 2	(Jordan) Al-Hussein

Tunis

==== Group B ====
Team	Pld	W	D	L	GF	GA	GD	Pts
(Algeria) WA Tlemcen	3	3	0	0	7	4	+3	6
(Kuwait) Al-Qadsia	3	2	0	1	5	2	+3	4
(Saudi Arabia) Al-Ettifaq	3	1	0	2	6	4	+2	2
(Palestine) Hilal Al-Quds	3	0	0	3	3	11	−8	0

Source: kooora.com
10 September 1993

WA Tlemcen (Algeria)	3 – 2	(Palestine) Hilal Al-Quds

Stade El Menzah, Tunis
10 September 1993

Al-Qadsia (Kuwait)	1 – 0	(Saudi Arabia) Al-Ettifaq

Stade El Menzah, Tunis

12 September 1993

WA Tlemcen (Algeria)	2 – 1	(Saudi Arabia) Al-Ettifaq

Stade El Menzah, Tunis
12 September 1993

Al-Qadsia (Kuwait)	3 – 0	(Palestine) Hilal Al-Quds

Stade El Menzah, Tunis

14 September 1993

WA Tlemcen (Algeria)	2 – 1	(Kuwait) Al-Qadsia

Stade El Menzah, Tunis
14 September 1993

Al-Ettifaq (Saudi Arabia)	5 – 1	(Palestine) Hilal Al-Quds

Stade El Menzah, Tunis

=== Knockout stage ===
Semi-finals
– Tunis
(Tunisia) Espérance	5
(Kuwait) Al-Qadsia	0
– Tunis
(Algeria) WA Tlemcen	2
(Bahrain) Al-Muharraq	3

Final
18 september – Tunis
(Tunisia) Espérance	3
(Bahrain) Al-Muharraq	0

==== Semi-finals ====
Espérance de Tunis (Tunisia)	5 – 0	(Kuwait) Al-Qadsia

Stade El Menzah, Tunis

WA Tlemcen (Algeria)	2 – 3	(Bahrain) Al-Muharraq

Stade El Menzah, Tunis

==== Final ====
18 September 1993

Espérance de Tunis (Tunisia)	3 – 0	(Bahrain) Al-Muharraq
Malitoli 39'; Thabet 70', 79'

Stade El Menzah, Tunis

== Winners ==
1993 Arab Club Champions Cup winners
(Tunisia)
Espérance de Tunis
First title
