= Abdelhamid Hergal =

Tunisian footballer

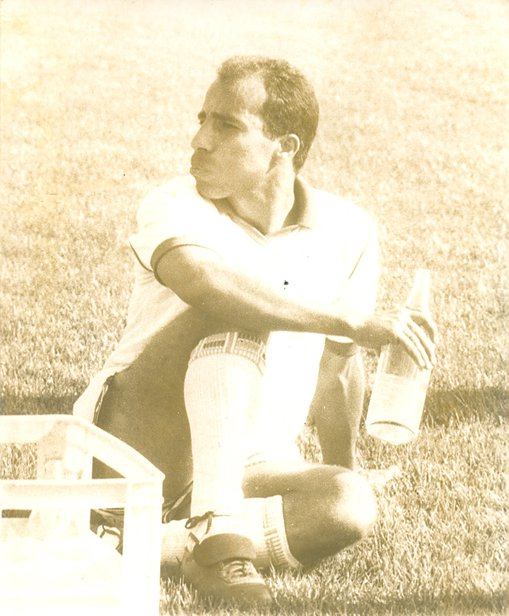

Personal information
- Full name: Abdelhamid Hergal
- Date of birth: 27 January 1959 (age 67)
- Place of birth: Tunis, Tunisia
- Position: Right winger

Youth career
- 1974–1977: Stade Tunisien

Senior career*
Years	Team	Apps	(Gls)
1977–1990	Stade Tunisien	257	(81)
1990–1991	Sur Club	?	(?)
1991–1992	Stade Tunisien	14	(4)
1992–1993	Espérance Sportive de Tunis	8	(0)
1993–1994	Stade Tunisien	1	(0)
Total		280	(85)

International career
1979–1991	Tunisia	48	(6)
- * Club domestic league appearances and goals

Abdelhamid Hergal also spelled Harguel, Hargel or Herguel (Arabic: عبد الحميد الهرقال), born 27 January 1959 in Tunis, is a Tunisian footballer who played as a striker with team Stade Tunisien, Espérance Sportive de Tunis and Tunisia national football team. He is the top scorer in the league, in the history of Stade Tunisien with 85 goals. A true technician and dazzling goal scorer, he is considered the best right winger of all time to play for Tunisia.
