= Ziad Tlemçani =

Tunisian footballer

Ziad Tlemcani
Personal information
- Full name: Hamed Ziad Tlemçani
- Date of birth: 10 May 1963 (age 63)
- Place of birth: Tunis, Tunisia
- Height: 1.81 m (5 ft 11 in)
- Position: Forward

Senior career*
Years	Team	Apps	(Gls)
1984–1990	Espérance Tunis		
1990–1994	Vitória de Guimarães	119	(45)
1995–1997	Vissel Kobe		
1997–1999	Espérance Tunis		

International career
1990–1998	Tunisia	20	(4)
- * Club domestic league appearances and goals

Hamed Ziad Tlemçani (Note: An alternative spelling is Ahmed Zied Tlemcani.) (Arabic: زياد التلمساني; born 10 May 1963) is a Tunisian former professional footballer who played as a forward for Espérance in Tunisia, Vitória S.C. in Portugal and Vissel Kobe in Japan. He was also a member of the Tunisia national team and scored 2 goals at the 1998 African Cup of Nations in Burkina Faso.

== Career statistics ==
=== Club ===
Appearances and goals by club, season and competition
Club	Season	League		
Club	Season	Division	Apps	Goals
Vitória de Guimarães	1990–91	Primeira Divisão	34	8
Vitória de Guimarães	1991–92	Primeira Divisão	32	15
Vitória de Guimarães	1992–93	Primeira Divisão	20	5
Vitória de Guimarães	1993–94	Primeira Divisão	24	11
Vitória de Guimarães	1994–95	Primeira Divisão	9	6
Vitória de Guimarães	Total		119	45
Vissel Kobe	1995	Football League	25	8
Vissel Kobe	1996	Football League	29	25
Vissel Kobe	1997	J1 League	16	4
Vissel Kobe	Total		70	37
Career total			189	82

=== International ===
Appearances and goals by national team and year
National team	Year	Apps	Goals
Tunisia	1990	2	0
Tunisia	1991	3	0
Tunisia	1992	4	0
Tunisia	1993	3	1
Tunisia	1994	2	0
Tunisia	1995	0	0
Tunisia	1996	0	0
Tunisia	1997	0	0
Tunisia	1998	6	3
Total		20	4

Scores and results list Tunisia's goal tally first, score column indicates score after each Tlemçani goal.

List of international goals scored by Zaid Tlemçani
No.	Date	Venue	Opponent	Score	Result	Competition
1	17 January 1993	Stade de l'Amitié, Cotonou, Benin	Benin	1–0	5–0	1994 FIFA World Cup qualification
2	31 January 1998	El Menzah Stadium, Tunis, Tunisia	Guinea	4–1	4–1	Friendly
3	12 February 1998	Stade Municipal, Ouagadougou, Burkina Faso	DR Congo	2–1	2–1	1998 Africa Cup of Nations
4	16 February 1998	Stade Municipal, Ouagadougou, Burkina Faso	Togo	1–1	3–1	1998 Africa Cup of Nations
