= SS Sfaxien =

Tunisian football club

Stade Sportif Sfaxien
- Full name: Stade Sportif Sfaxien
- Nickname: CIAPE / Trois S
- Ground: Stade du 2-mars (Sfax)
- League: CLP-2 season = 2013/14

Stade Sportif Sfaxien (Arabic: الملعب الرياضي الصفاقسي) (SSS, sometimes called the "3S") is a Tunisian football club from the city of Sfax. It get its name from its sponsor: The Société industrielle d'acide phosphorique et d'engrais (SIAPE).

== History ==
The club played in the Tunisian Ligue Professionnelle 1 for 7 seasons and then was relegated to the Tunisian Ligue Professionnelle 2. The last years they play in the Tunisian Ligue Professionnelle 3. At the season 2008–2009 the SSS was on the last position of the final table of the Tunisian Ligue Professionnelle 3 and was relegated in to the Honor division, LA4.

In 2007–2008, the club was eliminated in the 1/8 finals from the Tunisian President Cup against Club Sportif de Hammam-Lif, in Hammam Lif 3–1. At the season 2009–2010 le stade sportif sfaxien was eliminated in the 1/8 finals from the Tunisian President Cup against Club Africain 5–0 at Stade Olympique d'El Menzah .

== Achievements ==
- Tunisian Ligue Professionnelle 2 : (5)
  - Winner of (South Pole) : 1963–1964, 1970–1971, 1972–1973, 1976–1977, 1982–1983
- Tunisian Ligue Professionnelle 3 : (1)
  - Winner : 2004–2005

== Stadium ==
The Stade sportif sfaxien usually play at the Stade du 2-mars in Sfax but currently plays in the Stade de la cité El Habib. Larger matches are played at Stade Taïeb Mhiri in Sfax.
