= El Ahly Mateur =

Tunisian football club

- Founded: 1947
- Ground: Mateur
- League: Ligue Professionnelle 2
- 2009–10: Ligue Professionnelle 2, 12th
Home colours	Away colours

El Ahly Mateur (Arabic: الأهلي الماطري) is a Tunisian football club based in Mateur, Bizerte Governorate. The club are currently members of Ligue Professionnelle 2.

== History ==
The club was established in 1947 as Association of Mateur Alumni as a club for Tunisian players in order to compete with the French local side l'Espérance de Mateur and the Italian club Juventus Mateur. After Tunisian independence in 1956 its two local rivals folded and the club was renamed En Nadi Ahly Mateur

In 1961–62 the club won the Northern Division of the second tier and were promoted to the top division. They remained in the top flight until finishing bottom in 1965–66, when they were relegated. At the end of the season the club adopted its current name.

== Honours ==
- Tunisian Ligue Professionnelle 2
  - North Division champions 1961–62
- Third Division
  - North Division champions 1973–74, 1979–80, 2008–09
- Fourth Division
  - North Division champions 1992–93, 2005–06
