= El Makarem de Mahdia =

Tunisian football club

EM Mahdia
- Full name: El Makarem de Mahdia
- Nickname: EMM
- Founded: 1937
- Ground: Rached Khouja Stadium
- Capacity: 8.000
- Chairman: Med Salah Frad
- League: Ligue 2
- 2023–24: Ligue 2, Group B, 6th of 14
Home colours	Away colours

El Makarem de Mahdia (Arabic: مكارم المهدية), known as EMM for short, is a Tunisian football club based in Mahdia. The club was founded in 1937. and its colours are blue and white. Their home stadium, Rached Khouja Stadium, has a capacity of 8,000 spectators. The club is currently playing in the Tunisian Ligue Professionnelle 2.

== Coaching history ==
- Adel Zouali, Lotfi Boukhris, Mourad Sebayi, Foued Bahri, Nader Werda – 2012–2013
- Karim Gabsi – 2013–2014
- Fethi Hadj Ismaïl – 2014–2015
