= List of Tunisian Cup winning managers =

This is a list of Tunisian Cup winning football managers post-independence. Mokhtar Tlili has won the tournament on a record three occasions with Espérance de Tunis and CA Bizertin.

== Seasons and winning managers ==
Mokhtar Tlili won the Tunisian Cup a record three times with Espérance de Tunis and CA Bizertin.

Season	Country	Winning manager	Club	Ref
1955–56	Tunisia	Rachid Turki	Stade Tunisien	
1956–57	Tunisia	Hachemi Cherif	Espérance de Tunis	
1957–58	Algeria	Ahmed Benelfoul	Stade Tunisien	
1958–59	Tunisia	Habib Mougou	Étoile du Sahel	
1959–60	Tunisia	Ammar Nahali	Stade Tunisien	
1960–61	Hungary	Sándor Pázmándy	AS Marsa	
1961–62	Tunisia	Rachid Turki (2)	Stade Tunisien	
1962–63	Yugoslavia	Božidar Drenovac	Étoile du Sahel	
1963–64	Tunisia	Abderrahman Ben Azzedine	Espérance de Tunis	
1964–65	Italy	Fabio Roccheggiani	Club Africain	
1965–66	Tunisia	Ammar Nahali (2)	Stade Tunisien	
1966–67	Tunisia	Ridha Bach Hamba	Club Africain	
1967–68	Tunisia	Ahmed Dhib	Club Africain	
1968–69	Hungary	Andrej Prean Nagy	Club Africain	
1969–70	Hungary	Andrej Prean Nagy (2)	Club Africain	
1970–71	Yugoslavia	Jivko Popadic	CS Sfaxien	
1971–72	Tunisia	Jamel Eddine Bouabsa	Club Africain	
1972–73	Tunisia	Jamel Eddine Bouabsa (2)	Club Africain	
1973–74	Tunisia	Abdelmajid Chetali	Étoile du Sahel	
1974–75	Tunisia	Abdelmajid Chetali (2)	Étoile du Sahel	
1975–76	Yugoslavia	Dietscha Stefanovic	Club Africain	
1976–77	Tunisia	Taoufik Ben Othman	AS Marsa	
1977–78	The cup was not played.			
1978–79	Tunisia	Mokhtar Tlili	Espérance de Tunis	
1979–80	Tunisia	Mokhtar Tlili (2)	Espérance de Tunis	
1980–81	Tunisia	Mohsen Habacha	Étoile du Sahel	
1981–82	Tunisia	Mokhtar Tlili (3)	CA Bizertin	
1982–83	Tunisia	Mohsen Habacha (2)	Étoile du Sahel	
1983–84	Tunisia	Ali Selmi	AS Marsa	
1984–85	Yugoslavia	Dietscha Stefanovic (2)	CS Hammam-Lif	
1985–86	Brazil	Amarildo Tavares da Silveira	Espérance de Tunis	
1986–87	Tunisia	Youssef Zouaoui	CA Bizertin	
1987–88	Poland	Bernard Blaut	CS Transports	
1988–89	Poland	Antoni Piechniczek	Espérance de Tunis	
1989–90	Bulgaria	Aleksandar Kostov	AS Marsa	
1990–91	Poland	Zdzislaw Podedworny	Espérance de Tunis	
1991–92	Romania	Ilie Balaci	Club Africain	
1992–93	Poland	Andrzej Platek	Olympique Béja	
1993–94	Tunisia	Ali Selmi (2)	AS Marsa	
1994–95	Brazil	José Paulo Rubim	CS Sfaxien	
1995–96	Brazil	José Dutra dos Santos	Étoile du Sahel	
1996–97	Tunisia	Khaled Ben Yahia	Espérance de Tunis	
1997–98	France	René Exbrayat	Club Africain	
1998–99	Tunisia	Youssef Zouaoui (2)	Espérance de Tunis	
1999–00	France	René Exbrayat (2)	Club Africain	
2000–01	Tunisia	Ammar Souayah	CS Hammam-Lif	
2001–02	The cup was abandoned.			
2002–03	Tunisia	Ahmed Mghirbi	Stade Tunisien	
2003–04	Switzerland	Michel Decastel	CS Sfaxien	
2004–05	Tunisia	Lassaad Maamar	Espérance de Zarzis	
2005–06	Tunisia	Khaled Ben Yahia (2)	Espérance de Tunis	
2006–07	France	Jacky Duguépéroux	Espérance de Tunis	
2007–08	Brazil	Cabralzinho	Espérance de Tunis	
2008–09	Tunisia	Ghazi Ghrairi	CS Sfaxien	
2009–10	Algeria	Rachid Belhout	Olympique Béja	
2010–11	Tunisia	Nabil Maâloul	Espérance de Tunis	
2011–12	France	Denis Lavagne	Étoile du Sahel	
2012–13	Tunisia	Mondher Kebaier	CA Bizertin	
2013–14	France	Roger Lemerre	Étoile du Sahel	
2014–15	Tunisia	Faouzi Benzarti	Étoile du Sahel	
2015–16	Tunisia	Ammar Souayah (2)	Espérance de Tunis	
2016–17	Tunisia	Chiheb Ellili	Club Africain	
2017–18	Tunisia	Kamel Kolsi	Club Africain	
2018–19	Montenegro	Nebojša Jovović	CS Sfaxien	
2019–20	Tunisia	Lassaad Chabbi	US Monastir	
2020–21	Tunisia	Hammadi Daou	CS Sfaxien	
2021–22	Tunisia	Karim Dalhoum	CS Sfaxien	
2022–23	Tunisia	Jamel Khcharem	Olympique Béja	
2023–24	Tunisia	Hammadi Daou (2)	Stade Tunisien	
2024–25	Tunisia	Maher Kanzari	Espérance de Tunis	
2025–26	France	Christian Bracconi	Espérance de Tunis	—

== By manager ==
Name	Titles	Club(s)	Winning years
(Tunisia) Mokhtar Tlili	3	Espérance de Tunis, CA Bizertin	1978–79, 1979–80, 1981–82
(Tunisia) Rachid Turki	2	Stade Tunisien	1955–56, 1961–62
(Tunisia) Ammar Nahali	2	Stade Tunisien	1959–60, 1965–66
(Hungary) Andrej Prean Nagy	2	Club Africain	1968–69, 1969–70
(Tunisia) Jamel Eddine Bouabsa	2	Club Africain	1971–72, 1972–73
(Tunisia) Abdelmajid Chetali	2	Étoile du Sahel	1973–74, 1974–75
(Tunisia) Mohsen Habacha	2	Étoile du Sahel	1980–81, 1982–83
(Socialist Federal Republic of Yugoslavia) Dietscha Stefanovic	2	Club Africain, CS Hammam-Lif	1975–76, 1984–85
(Tunisia) Ali Selmi	2	AS Marsa	1983–84, 1993–94
(Tunisia) Youssef Zouaoui	2	CA Bizertin, Espérance de Tunis	1986–87, 1998–99
(France) René Exbrayat	2	Club Africain	1997–98, 1999–00
(Tunisia) Khaled Ben Yahia	2	Espérance de Tunis	1996–97, 2005–06
(Tunisia) Ammar Souayah	2	CS Hammam-Lif, Espérance de Tunis	2000–01, 2015–16
(Tunisia) Hammadi Daou	2	CS Sfaxien, Stade Tunisien	2020–21, 2023–24

== See also ==
- List of Tunisian Cup finals
