= List of Tunisian Cup finals =

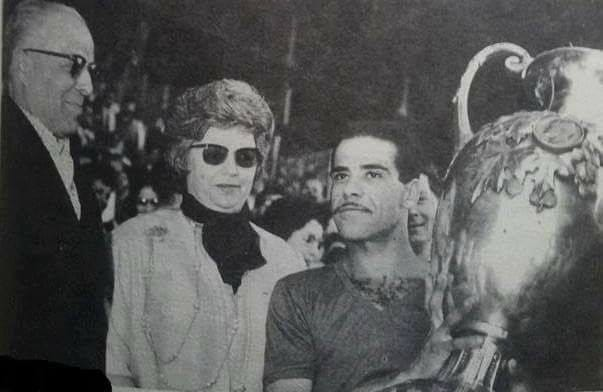
- Taieb Jebali of Stade Tunisien receives the Tunisian Cup trophy from President Habib Bourguiba in the final of the 1959–60 edition.
- Founded: 1922; 104 years ago
- Region: Tunisia
- Qualifier for: CAF Confederation Cup
- Domestic cup: Tunisian Super Cup
- Current champions: Espérance de Tunis (17th title)
- Most championships: Espérance de Tunis (17 titles)
- 2026–27 Tunisian Cup

The Tunisian Cup (Arabic: كأس تونس), and formerly known as Tunisian President Cup (1956–2011), is the premier knockout football competition in Tunisian football, organized annually by the Tunisian Football Federation (FTF), which is considered the second most important national title after the Tunisian Ligue Professionnelle 1. The reigning champions are Espérance de Tunis, who won their sixteenth title at the 2024–25 season.

The first edition took place during the 1922–23 season under the French protectorate organized by the Tunisian Football League (an offshoot of the French Football Federation). The first final after independence, which took place at the end of the 1955–56 season, was won by Stade Tunisien. The cup is therefore organized every year, with the exception of the 1977–78 season due to the participation of the Tunisia national team’s in the 1978 FIFA World Cup in Argentina, and the 2001–02 edition which is not completed due to the national team's participation in the 2002 FIFA World Cup in Japan and South Korea. The final match has been held generally since 2001 at the Hammadi Agrebi Stadium in Radès. A new Tunisian Cup Trophy is adopted whenever a team triumphs the same Trophy three times, the current cup has been taken since 2020.

Espérance Sportive de Tunis is the most successful team with a record 16 titles. As for Étoile Sportive du Sahel, it has occupied second place fifteen times, the last of which was during the 2018–19 season. Club Africain is the team that has played in the most finals (27 times), as well as the team that retained the title for four consecutive seasons (1966–67, 1967–68, 1968–69 and 1969–70) . Coach Mokhtar Tlili has won the tournament a record three times with Espérance de Tunis (2) and CA Bizertin (1), while player Sadok Sassi has won the title a record 8 times with Club Africain. From the start of the 2020s, the management of the Tunisian Football Federation decided to play the final match outside the capital Tunis and move it to regions, such as Monastir in the final of the 2019–20 season and Djerba in the final of the 2020–21 season.

== Finals table ==
- The lists of finals are shown in the following tables:

=== Pre-independence ===
N°	Season	Winner	Score	Runner-up	Date	Venue	Ref
1	1922–23	Avant Garde	1–0	Racing Club de Tunis	27 May 1923		
2	1923–24	Racing Club de Tunis	2–1	Sporting Club de Ferryville	30 March 1924		
3	1924–25	Stade Gaulois	2–0	Sporting Club de Tunis	29 March 1925		
4	1925–26	Racing Club de Tunis	2–1	Football Club de Bizerte	14 March 1926	Vélodrome Stadium	
5	1926–27	Stade Gaulois	2–0	Sporting Club de Tunis	13 February 1927	Vélodrome Stadium	
—	1927–28	No competition					
—	1928–29	No competition					
6	1929–30	US Tunis	2–1	Sporting Club de Tunis	24 May 1930	Vélodrome Stadium	
7	1930–31	US Tunis	Round-robin	Métlaoui Sports / US Béja	1931	Vélodrome Stadium	
8	1931–32	Racing Club de Tunis	1–1 (5–0 R)	Sporting Club de Tunis	1932	Vélodrome Stadium	
9	1932–33	US Tunis	2–1 (a.e.t.)	Stade Gaulois	7 May 1933	Vélodrome Stadium	
10	1933–34	US Tunis	1–1 (2–1 R)	Vaillante-Sporting Club de Ferryville	1934	Vélodrome Stadium	
11	1934–35	US Tunis	3–0	Sporting Club de Tunis	1935	Vélodrome Stadium	
12	1935–36	Italia de Tunis	1–0	Jeunesse de Hammam Lif	14 June 1936	Tunis municipal stadium	
13	1936–37	Stade Gaulois	1–0	Espérance de Tunis	9 May 1937	Tunis municipal stadium	
14	1937–38	Sporting Club de Tunis	0–0 (2–0 R)	Racing Club de Tunis	9 May–15 May 1938	Tunis municipal stadium	
15	1938–39	Espérance de Tunis	4–1	Étoile du Sahel	28 May 1939	Tunis municipal stadium	
—	1939–40	No competition					
—	1940–41	No competition					
16	1941–42	US Ferryville	4–1	US Béja	28 April 1942	Vélodrome Stadium	
—	1942–43	No competition					
—	1943–44	No competition					
17	1944–45	Olympique de Tunis	0–0 (1–0 R)	Espérance de Tunis	1945	Vélodrome Stadium	
18	1945–46	PFC Bizerte	3–1	Étoile du Sahel	1946		
19	1946–47	CS Hammam-Lif	2–1	Espérance de Tunis	4 May 1947		
20	1947–48	CS Hammam-Lif	2–0	PFC Bizerte	1948	Geo André Stadium	
21	1948–49	CS Hammam-Lif	1–0	CA Bizertin	1949	Geo André Stadium	
22	1949–50	CS Hammam-Lif	3–0	Étoile du Sahel	1950	Geo André Stadium	
23	1950–51	CS Hammam-Lif	2–0	CA Bizertin	6 May 1951	Geo André Stadium	
—	1951–52	No competition					
—	1952–53	No competition					
24	1953–54	CS Hammam-Lif	1–0	Étoile du Sahel	1954	Geo André Stadium	
25	1954–55	CS Hammam-Lif	2–1	Sfax Railway Sports	1 May 1955	Geo André Stadium	

=== Post-independence ===
Defined on penalty shoot-out
Defined after extra time
Defined after a replay
Defined on corner kicks

Replays: Replays were used to determine the winner of the knockout tournament when the first leg ended in a draw. If the second match remained tied, the team that played the most corners was considered the winning team. This rule was applied twice in the history of the Tunisian Cup finals in 1970 and 1976, and the matches were replayed after a draw seven times.

Penalty shoot-out: The penalty shoot-out law was applied in the 16-final round of the Tunisian Cup in the 1976–77 edition in the match that brought together the EO La Goulette et du Kram and Stade Tunisien, which prevailed 4–3. For the final matches, nine matches were decided by penalty shoot-outs. The first was the 1984 final between the champion, AS Marsa, and the runner-up, CS Sfaxien.

N°	Season	Winners	Score	Runners-up	Date	Referee	Venue	Ref
26	1955–56	Stade Tunisien	3–1	Club Africain	10 June 1956	(Tunisia) Ali Meddeb	Chedly Zouiten Stadium	
27	1956–57	Espérance de Tunis	2–1	Étoile du Sahel	31 March 1957	(Tunisia) Bahri Ben Saiid	Chedly Zouiten Stadium	
28	1957–58	Stade Tunisien	2–0	Étoile du Sahel	8 June 1958	(Tunisia) Mustpha Belakhouas	Chedly Zouiten Stadium	
29	1958–59	Étoile du Sahel	2–2 (3–2 R)	Espérance de Tunis	1 May–31 May 1959	(Italy) Giuseppe Adami	Chedly Zouiten Stadium	
30	1959–60	Stade Tunisien	2–0	Étoile du Sahel	29 May 1960	(Tunisia) Bahri Ben Saiid	Chedly Zouiten Stadium	
31	1960–61	AS Marsa	0–0 (3–0 R)	Stade Tunisien	23 April–28 May 1961	(Tunisia) Mustpha Belakhouas	Chedly Zouiten Stadium	
32	1961–62	Stade Tunisien	1–1 (1–0 R)	Stade Soussien	13 May–10 June 1962	(Tunisia) Mustpha Belakhouas	Chedly Zouiten Stadium	
33	1962–63	Étoile du Sahel	0–0 (2–1 R)	Club Africain	19 May 1963	(Tunisia) Victor Habib	Chedly Zouiten Stadium	
34	1963–64	Espérance de Tunis	1–0	CS Hammam-Lif	10 May 1964	(Tunisia) Bahri Ben Saiid	Chedly Zouiten Stadium	
35	1964–65	Club Africain	0–0 (2–1 R)	AS Marsa	16 May–6 June 1965	(Tunisia) Hedi Abd Kader	Chedly Zouiten Stadium	
36	1965–66	Stade Tunisien	1–0	AS Marsa	22 May 1966	(Tunisia) Moncef Ben Ali	Chedly Zouiten Stadium	
37	1966–67	Club Africain	2–0 (a.e.t.)	Étoile du Sahel	1 June 1967	(Tunisia) Mustpha Daoud	Chedly Zouiten Stadium	
38	1967–68	Club Africain	3–2	Sfax Railway Sports	23 June 1968	(Tunisia) Hedi Zarrouk	El Menzah Stadium	
39	1968–69	Club Africain	2–0	Espérance de Tunis	13 July 1969	(Tunisia) Mohamed Touati	El Menzah Stadium	
40	1969–70	Club Africain	0–0 (0–0 R) (5–3 C)	AS Marsa	7 June–20 June 1970	(Tunisia) Hedi Atik	El Menzah Stadium	
41	1970–71	CS Sfaxien	1–0	Espérance de Tunis	13 June 1971	(Morocco) Borezgi	El Menzah Stadium	
42	1971–72	Club Africain	1–0 (a.e.t.)	Stade Tunisien	9 July 1972	(Italy) Francesco Francescon	El Menzah Stadium	
43	1972–73	Club Africain	1–0	AS Marsa	17 June 1973	(Tunisia) Mohamed Kadri	El Menzah Stadium	
44	1973–74	Étoile du Sahel	1–0	Club Africain	26 May 1974	(Italy) Luciano Giunti	El Menzah Stadium	
45	1974–75	Étoile du Sahel	1–1 (3–0 R)	El Makarem de Mahdia	8 June–28 June 1975	(Tunisia) Ali Dridi (Tunisia) Ali Ben Nasser	El Menzah Stadium	
46	1975–76	Club Africain	1–1 (0–0 R) (3–1 C)	Espérance de Tunis	13 June–4 July 1976	(Austria) Erich Linemayr	El Menzah Stadium	
47	1976–77	AS Marsa	3–0	CS Sfaxien	25 June 1977	(Italy) Domenico Serafini	El Menzah Stadium	
—	1977–78	The cup was not played due to the Tunisian national team's participation in the 1978 FIFA World Cup and was replaced by the Hamda Laouani tournament.						
48	1978–79	Espérance de Tunis	0–0 (3–2 R)	Sfax Railway Sports	17 June–24 June 1979	(Tunisia) Issaoui Boudabbous	El Menzah Stadium	
49	1979–80	Espérance de Tunis	2–0	Club Africain	24 May 1980	(Tunisia) Issaoui Boudabbous	El Menzah Stadium	
50	1980–81	Étoile du Sahel	3–1	Stade Tunisien	2 June 1981	(Tunisia) Ali Dridi	El Menzah Stadium	
51	1981–82	CA Bizertin	1–0	Club Africain	2 June 1982	(Tunisia) Neji Jouini	El Menzah Stadium	
52	1982–83	Étoile du Sahel	3–1 (a.e.t.)	AS Marsa	5 June 1983	(Tunisia) Ali Ben Nasser	El Menzah Stadium	
53	1983–84	AS Marsa	0–0 (5–4 p)	CS Sfaxien	5 June 1984	(Tunisia) Arbi Weslati	El Menzah Stadium	
54	1984–85	CS Hammam-Lif	0–0 (3–2 p)	Club Africain	1 June 1985	(Tunisia) Nacer Kraiem	El Menzah Stadium	
55	1985–86	Espérance de Tunis	0–0 (4–1 p)	Club Africain	15 June 1986	(Tunisia) Mohamed Charki	El Menzah Stadium	
56	1986–87	CA Bizertin	1–0	AS Marsa	14 June 1987	(Tunisia) Rachid Ben Khadija	El Menzah Stadium	
57	1987–88	CS Transports	1–1 (5–4 p)	Club Africain	19 June 1988	(Tunisia) Habib Mimouni	El Menzah Stadium	
58	1988–89	Espérance de Tunis	2–0	Club Africain	24 December 1989	(France) Claude Bouillet	El Menzah Stadium	
59	1989–90	AS Marsa	3–2	Stade Tunisien	28 June 1990	(Tunisia) Fathi Bousetta	El Menzah Stadium	
60	1990–91	Espérance de Tunis	2–1	Étoile du Sahel	8 December 1991	(France) Alain Sars	El Menzah Stadium	
61	1991–92	Club Africain	2–1	Stade Tunisien	21 June 1992	(Tunisia) Rachid Ben Khadija	El Menzah Stadium	
62	1992–93	Olympique Béja	0–0 (3–1 p)	AS Marsa	13 June 1993	(Tunisia) Abd Rasak Sdiri	El Menzah Stadium	
63	1993–94	AS Marsa	1–0	Étoile du Sahel	26 June 1994	(Tunisia) Ferid Salhi	El Menzah Stadium	
64	1994–95	CS Sfaxien	2–1	Olympique Béja	1 July 1995	(Tunisia) Zoubaier Bou Nouira	El Menzah Stadium	
65	1995–96	Étoile du Sahel	2–1	JS Kairouan	6 July 1996	(Tunisia) Alala Meliki	El Menzah Stadium	
66	1996–97	Espérance de Tunis	1–0	CS Sfaxien	21 June 1997	(Tunisia) Mourad Daami	El Menzah Stadium	
67	1997–98	Club Africain	1–1 (4–3 p)	Olympique Béja	3 May 1998	(Tunisia) Rachid Berrouni	El Menzah Stadium	
68	1998–99	Espérance de Tunis	2–1 (a.e.t.)	Club Africain	1 July 1999	(Italy) Pierluigi Collina	El Menzah Stadium	
69	1999–00	Club Africain	0–0 (4–3 p)	CS Sfaxien	22 October 2000	(Tunisia) Ridha Boughalia	El Menzah Stadium	
70	2000–01	CS Hammam-Lif	1–0	Étoile du Sahel	6 July 2001	(Morocco) Mohamed Kazzaz	El Menzah Stadium	
—	2001–02	The cup was abandoned on 19 February 2002 due to the Tunisian national team's participation in the 2002 FIFA World Cup.						
71	2002–03	Stade Tunisien	1–0	Club Africain	15 June 2003	(Tunisia) Hichem Guirat	Radès Olympic Stadium	
72	2003–04	CS Sfaxien	2–0 (a.e.t.)	Espérance de Tunis	20 November 2004	(Italy) M. Trifolloni	Radès Olympic Stadium	
73	2004–05	Espérance de Zarzis	2–0	Espérance de Tunis	22 May 2005	(Tunisia) Hichem Guirat	Radès Olympic Stadium	
74	2005–06	Espérance de Tunis	2–2 (5–4 p)	Club Africain	12 May 2006	(Switzerland) René Rogalla	Radès Olympic Stadium	
75	2006–07	Espérance de Tunis	2–1	CA Bizertin	20 May 2007	(Spain) Eduardo Iturralde González	Radès Olympic Stadium	
76	2007–08	Espérance de Tunis	2–1	Étoile du Sahel	6 July 2008	(Germany) Florian Meyer	Radès Olympic Stadium	
77	2008–09	CS Sfaxien	1–0 (a.e.t.)	US Monastir	23 May 2009	(Tunisia) Slim Jedidi	Radès Olympic Stadium	
78	2009–10	Olympique Béja	1–0	CS Sfaxien	22 May 2010	(Tunisia) Slim Jedidi	Radès Olympic Stadium	
79	2010–11	Espérance de Tunis	1–0	Étoile du Sahel	25 July 2011	(Tunisia) Mohamed Said Kordi	Radès Olympic Stadium	
80	2011–12	Étoile du Sahel	1–0	CS Sfaxien	11 August 2013 (Note: The 2011–12 season was suspended in 2012 and resumed in 2013.)	(Tunisia) Slim Belkhouas	Radès Olympic Stadium	
81	2012–13	CA Bizertin	2–1	AS Marsa	15 June 2013	(Tunisia) Mohamed Ben Hassan	Chedly Zouiten Stadium	
82	2013–14	Étoile du Sahel	1–0	CS Sfaxien	27 June 2014	(Tunisia) Youssef Srairi	Radès Olympic Stadium	
83	2014–15	Étoile du Sahel	4–3	Stade Gabèsien	29 August 2015	(Tunisia) Amir Loussif	Radès Olympic Stadium	
84	2015–16	Espérance de Tunis	2–0	Club Africain	27 August 2016	(Tunisia) Haythem Guirat	Radès Olympic Stadium	
85	2016–17	Club Africain	1–0	US Ben Guerdane	17 June 2017	(Tunisia) Sadok Selmi	Radès Olympic Stadium	
86	2017–18	Club Africain	4–1	Étoile du Sahel	13 May 2018	(Tunisia) Youssef Srairi	Radès Olympic Stadium	
87	2018–19	CS Sfaxien	0–0 (5–4 p)	Étoile du Sahel	17 August 2019	(Tunisia) Naim Hosni	Radès Olympic Stadium	
88	2019–20	US Monastir	2–0	Espérance de Tunis	27 September 2020	(Tunisia) Sadok Salmi	Mustapha Jannet Stadium	
89	2020–21	CS Sfaxien	0–0 (5–4 p)	Club Africain	27 June 2021	(Tunisia) Mehrez Melki	Midoun Municipal Stadium	
90	2021–22	CS Sfaxien	2–0	AS Marsa	10 September 2022	(Tunisia) Yosri Bouali	Hammadi Agrebi Stadium	
91	2022–23	Olympique Béja	1–0	Espérance de Tunis	28 May 2023	(Tunisia) Haythem Guirat	Hammadi Agrebi Stadium	
92	2023–24	Stade Tunisien	2–0	CA Bizertin	30 June 2024	(Tunisia) Seif Ouertani	Hammadi Agrebi Stadium	
93	2024–25	Espérance de Tunis	1–0	Stade Tunisien	1 June 2025	(Tunisia) Oussama Ben Ishak	Hammadi Agrebi Stadium	
94	2025–26	Espérance de Tunis	1–0	ES Zarzis	31 May 2026	(Tunisia) Nidhal Letaief	Hammadi Agrebi Stadium	

== Performance by club ==
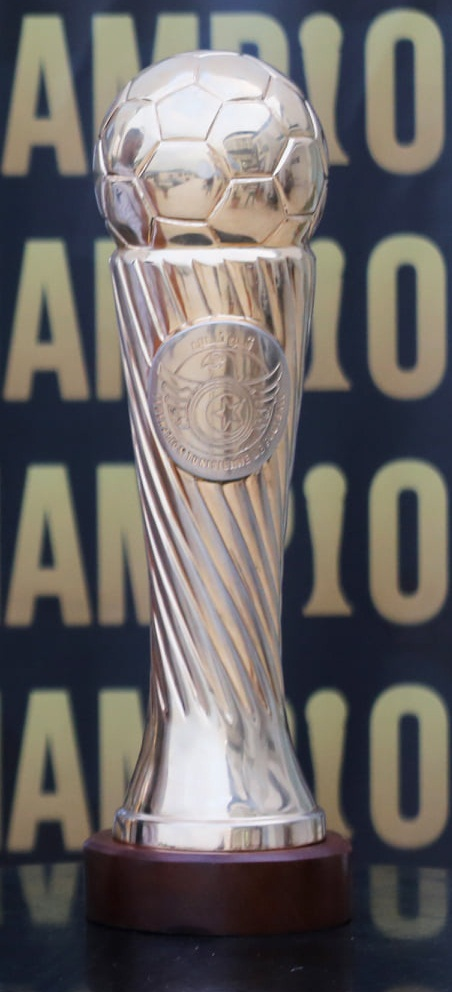
Current trophy since 2020

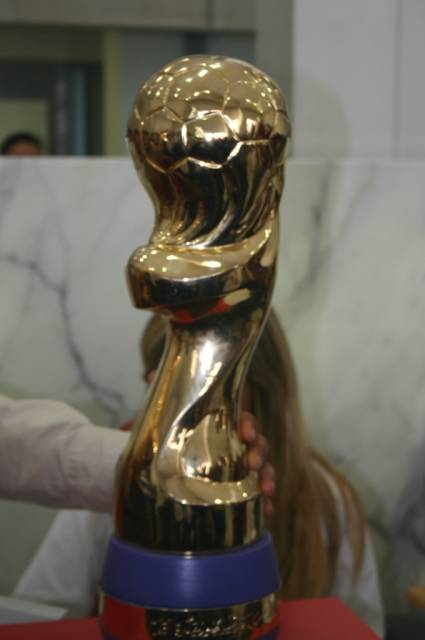
Trophy between 1995 and 2010

Club	Winners	Runners-up	Total finals	Seasons won
Espérance de Tunis	17	11	28	1938–39, 1956–57, 1963–64, 1978–79, 1979–80, 1985–86, 1988–89, 1990–91, 1996–97, 1998–99, 2005–06, 2006–07, 2007–08, 2010–11, 2015–16, 2024–25, 2025–26
Club Africain	13	14	27	1964–65, 1966–67, 1967–68, 1968–69, 1969–70, 1971–72, 1972–73, 1975–76, 1991–92, 1997–98, 1999–00, 2016–17, 2017–18
Étoile du Sahel	10	15	25	1958–59, 1962–63, 1973–74, 1974–75, 1980–81, 1982–83, 1995–96, 2011–12, 2013–14, 2014–15
CS Hammam-Lif	9	1	10	1946–47, 1947–48, 1948–49, 1949–50, 1950–51, 1953–54, 1954–55, 1984–85, 2000–01
CS Sfaxien	7	7	14	1970–71, 1994–95, 2003–04, 2008–09, 2018–19, 2020–21, 2021–22
Stade Tunisien	7	5	12	1955–56, 1957–58, 1959–60, 1961–62, 1965–66, 2002–03, 2023–24
AS Marsa	5	9	14	1960–61, 1976–77, 1983–84, 1989–90, 1993–94
US Tunis	5	0	5	1929–30, 1930–31, 1932–33, 1933–34, 1934–35
CA Bizertin	3	4	7	1981–82, 1986–87, 2012–13
Olympique Béja	3	2	5	1992–93, 2009–10, 2022–23
Stade Gaulois	3	0	3	1924–25, 1926–27, 1936–37
Racing Club de Tunis	2	0	2	1923–24, 1931–32
Sporting Club de Tunis	2	0	2	1925–26, 1937–38
US Monastir	1	1	2	2019–20
ES Zarzis	1	1	2	2004–05
Avant Garde	1	0	1	1922–23
Italia de Tunis	1	0	1	1935–36
US Ferryville	1	0	1	1941–42
Olympique de Tunis	1	0	1	1944–45
PFC Bizertin	1	0	1	1945–46
CO Transports	1	0	1	1987–88

- Italic denotes defunct teams.

== See also ==
- List of Tunisian Cup winning managers
