= Dino Maamria =

Tunisian footballer and manager (born 1971)

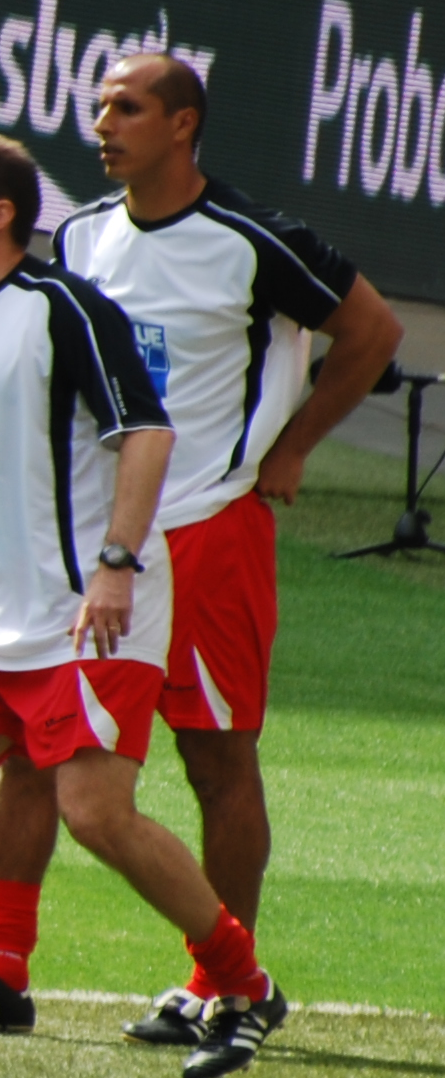
- Maamria serving as first-team coach of Stevenage Borough in the 2009 FA Trophy final

Personal information
- Full name: Noureddine Maamria
- Date of birth: 26 May 1971 (age 55)
- Place of birth: Gafsa, Tunisia
- Height: 6 ft 0 in (1.83 m)
- Position: Forward

Youth career
- AS Marsa

Senior career*
Years	Team	Apps	(Gls)
- AS Marsa
- CO Transports
1995	Burnley	0	(0)
1996–1997	Glentoran	7	(2)
1998	Ayr United	2	(0)
1998–2000	Doncaster Rovers	53	(12)
2000–2001	Southport	25	(3)
2001–2003	Leigh RMI	54	(24)
2003	Stevenage Borough	11	(5)
2003	Charleston Battery	9	(0)
2003–2006	Stevenage Borough	84	(26)
2006–2007	Southport	17	(6)
2007	Rushden & Diamonds	4	(1)
2007	→ Southport (loan)	10	(2)
2007–2008	Northwich Victoria	11	(0)
2009–2012	Stevenage	1	(0)
Total		288	(81)

International career
1991	Tunisia U21	1	(0)

Managerial career
- 2007–2008: Northwich Victoria
- 2015–2016: Southport
- 2017–2018: Nuneaton Town
- 2018–2019: Stevenage
- 2019–2020: Oldham Athletic
- 2022–2023: Burton Albion
- 2026: Barrow
- * Club domestic league appearances and goals

Noureddine "Dino" Maamria (born 26 May 1971) is a Tunisian football manager and former professional footballer who has spent most of his playing and coaching career in the United Kingdom. He primarily played as a forward during a 20-year professional career.

Maamria began his footballing career with AS Marsa and CO Transports in Tunisia. In 1995, he moved to England, signing for Second Division club Burnley following a trial. He subsequently played for Glentoran in Northern Ireland and Ayr United in Scotland, before returning to England with Football Conference club Doncaster Rovers in 1998. Further spells in the Conference followed with Southport, Leigh RMI and Stevenage Borough, where he made 108 appearances and scored 38 goals under manager Graham Westley, with a brief stint at Charleston Battery in the United States in 2003. He later returned to Southport and also played for Rushden & Diamonds and Northwich Victoria.

At Northwich, Maamria transitioned into management at the age of 36, taking caretaker charge in October 2007 with the club in administration and 15 points from safety at the bottom of the Conference Premier. He guided them to survival and was named the division's Manager of the Year. He later served as coach and assistant manager under Westley at Stevenage, Preston North End and Newport County, while also managing Southport and Nuneaton Town. He returned to Stevenage as manager in March 2018, where his tenure ended in September 2019. Later that month, he became head coach of Oldham Athletic. He subsequently managed Burton Albion in September 2022, leaving the role in December 2023, and was appointed head coach of League Two club Barrow in February 2026, a position he held for one month.

== Early life ==
Maamria was born and raised in Gafsa, Tunisia, the youngest of seven siblings. His father worked in the phosphate mines, and the family lived in a tent until he was four years old. He recalled running long distances to school and the family keeping two goats, one of which he named after Gary Lineker. Inspired by Tunisia's debut at the 1978 FIFA World Cup, he aspired to a career in football. He has cited Diego Maradona as his footballing hero, considering him the greatest player of all time.

== Club career ==
=== Early career ===
Maamria progressed through the youth system at AS Marsa in Tunisia, making one appearance for the Tunisia under-21 team in 1991. He featured in the Tunisian President Cup final in 1994, in which AS Marsa defeated Étoile Sportive du Sahel 1–0 at Stade El Menzah. He described the match as one of the proudest moments of his career, as it was played in front of the Tunisian President. He briefly played for CO Transports, who also competed in the Tunisian Ligue Professionnelle 1.

While playing for AS Marsa in an away match against Étoile Sportive du Sahel in Sousse, a tourist resort in the north of Tunisia, he was watched by Burnley's chief scout at the time, Brian Miller, who was on holiday. Invited to a two-week trial in 1995, he scored in a reserve match against Bradford City and was offered a short-term contract, but did not make a first-team appearance after breaking his leg during the trial. Released at the end of the year, he joined Glentoran of the Irish League, signing under manager Tommy Cassidy on the recommendation of Burnley caretaker manager Clive Middlemass, and scored two goals in seven appearances. He signed for Scottish First Division club Ayr United during the 1997–98 season, where he made two appearances.

=== Doncaster Rovers ===
Following his departure from Ayr, Maamria signed for Football Conference club Doncaster Rovers in August 1998, making his debut in a 1–0 defeat to Dover Athletic on 15 August 1998. Deployed as a winger in his first season, he scored three goals in 18 appearances. Ahead of the 1999–2000 season, he was informed by manager Ian Snodin that he was not part of the club's long-term plans, although he chose to remain at Doncaster after offering to play without a contract. He was utilised as a centre-forward during the season, and finished as the club's top goalscorer with nine goals in 39 appearances. In March 2000, he was placed on the transfer list, attracting interest from Cardiff City and Kingstonian, with Cardiff making a formal bid that did not result in a move. He was released in June 2000 and subsequently attended a two-week course to obtain a Football Association coaching badge.

=== Southport and Leigh RMI ===
Maamria joined Football Conference club Southport in July 2000. He made his first appearance as a 65th-minute substitute in a 1–0 away win against Chester City on 2 September 2000, and scored his first goal a week later in a 3–0 victory over Telford United. He finished the season with 13 goals in 34 appearances, including eight goals in the Lancashire FA Challenge Trophy, which Southport won. He was released at the end of the season. He was appointed Burnley's Ethnic Minorities Development Officer in April 2001. His role focused on increasing the club's engagement with local Asian communities through school visits, football sessions, and matchday initiatives.

Ahead of the 2001–02 season, Maamria signed a two-year contract with fellow Football Conference club Leigh RMI after scoring three goals in pre-season. Alongside his playing role, he held a coaching position at Burnley. He scored on his debut in a 1–1 draw with Hayes, and ended the season with 13 goals in 31 appearances. During the campaign, he received the first red card of his career, for violent conduct in stoppage time in a match against Nuneaton Borough on 9 March 2002. At the start of the following season, he scored his first professional hat-trick in a 4–2 home victory over Burton Albion on 24 August 2002, and went on to score 13 goals in 27 appearances, including another hat-trick against Barnet.

=== Stevenage Borough ===
Newly appointed Stevenage Borough manager Graham Westley identified Maamria as a transfer target in February 2003. A fee was agreed with Leigh RMI, but Maamria initially rejected the move following negotiations. After an improved offer, he signed for Stevenage for a five-figure fee on 21 February 2003. He made his debut the following day in a 2–2 draw with Hereford United and scored his first goals for the club with a brace in a 2–0 away victory against local rivals Barnet on 1 March 2003. He made 11 appearances and scored five goals as Stevenage moved from the relegation zone to finish 12th. At the end of the season, Maamria joined Charleston Battery in the USL A-League, making nine appearances without scoring, before returning to Stevenage in September 2003 after receiving international clearance. He scored 13 goals in 32 appearances during the 2003–04 season.

In the 2004–05 season, a winning goal against former club Leigh RMI in October 2004 preceded a run of nine goals in nine matches. Maamria scored both of Stevenage's goals in their 2–1 aggregate victory over Hereford United in the play-off semi-finals, and played in the 1–0 defeat to Carlisle United in the final. He ended the season with 13 goals from 33 appearances. Maamria received three red cards in the opening three months of the 2005–06 season, resulting in a five-match suspension. He was later deployed in central midfield, scoring seven goals in 31 appearances across the season. Maamria left the club at the end of the season, having made 96 appearances and scored 33 goals during his second spell.

=== Further spells and retirement ===
Maamria rejoined Conference National club Southport in July 2006, scoring seven goals in 20 appearances during the first half of the 2006–07 season. In December 2006, Rushden & Diamonds manager Graham Westley sought to make him his first signing, offering him a player-coach role, although Southport stated they had not received an official approach. Southport indicated they would require an improved offer, while Maamria expressed a desire to join Rushden to further his coaching career under Westley. He signed a one-and-a-half year contract with Rushden on 31 January 2007, scoring once in four appearances before returning to Southport on loan in March 2007 following Westley's dismissal. His contract at Rushden was cancelled by mutual consent in May 2007.

He signed for Conference Premier club Northwich Victoria on 10 August 2007, making 11 appearances during the opening two months of the 2007–08 season before being appointed caretaker manager in October 2007, after which he did not play for the club again. During the 2008–09 season, while serving as first-team coach at Stevenage, he was registered as a player due to limited squad availability and helped the club win its first Herts Senior Cup in April 2009, scoring twice in a 2–1 victory over Cheshunt in the final. Later that month, he made a brief substitute appearance in a 1–0 victory over Ebbsfleet United, his final professional match. He was an unused substitute in the 2009 FA Trophy final and was assigned a first-team squad number in both the 2009–10 and 2010–11 seasons.

== Managerial career ==
=== Early coaching career ===
Having always intended to move into coaching after his playing career, Maamria began working with Burnley's youth teams while recovering from a broken leg sustained at the club. He coached the under-12, under-14, and under-16 teams three evenings a week, continuing in various age-group roles alongside his playing commitments. During this period, he helped develop future professional footballers Richard Chaplow, Marc Pugh, and Jay Rodriguez, all of whom later played in the Premier League. He obtained his UEFA B Licence in 1999, his UEFA A Licence in 2001, and also attended a two-week FA coaching course at Lilleshall in June 2000.

=== Northwich Victoria ===
While playing for Conference Premier club Northwich Victoria at the age of 36, Maamria was appointed caretaker manager in October 2007. At the time, Northwich were bottom of the league, having lost 15 of their opening 17 matches and drawn the other two, leaving them 15 points adrift of safety, and they had also entered administration. In his second match in charge, Northwich recorded their first victory of the season, a 3–1 away win against Southport in the FA Cup on 27 October 2007. Following a change of ownership on 11 December 2007, Maamria was confirmed as permanent manager. Under his management, Northwich won six of 11 matches and went on an eight-match unbeaten run in March 2008. Two victories within the space of three days in April 2008, including a 2–1 away win over his former club Stevenage, ensured the club's survival with a game to spare. Maamria was subsequently named Conference Manager of the Year for the 2007–08 season.

He remained in charge at the start of the 2008–09 season, but Northwich lost seven out of their opening ten matches. In September 2008, he was placed on gardening leave for reasons not disclosed, and was dismissed on 23 October 2008 following an internal investigation.

=== Coaching spells ===
Maamria rejoined former club Stevenage Borough in November 2008 as first-team coach under manager Graham Westley, who had previously signed him during his playing career. He recommended the signing of Mark Roberts, having managed him at Northwich, with Roberts stating that Maamria's belief and desire were key factors in his decision to join Stevenage. Maamria's appointment, alongside several new additions including Roberts and Jon Ashton, coincided with a club-record 24-match unbeaten run between December 2008 and April 2009. Stevenage won the FA Trophy that season, before securing promotion to the Football League for the first time in their history by winning the Conference Premier title in Maamria's first full season on the coaching staff. The following year, the club achieved successive promotions by winning the League Two play-offs.

In January 2012, Maamria joined League One club Preston North End as first-team coach following Westley's appointment as manager. He left the club in February 2013 after Westley was dismissed. The following month, he returned to Stevenage as assistant manager during Westley's third spell in charge. In 2015, Maamria obtained his UEFA Pro Licence.

=== Southport ===
Maamria was appointed manager of National League club Southport on 19 November 2015, his first managerial role since keeping Northwich Victoria in the division seven years earlier. He returned having played for the club during three separate spells. At the time of his appointment, Southport were in the relegation zone, with three wins from their opening 20 matches and eight points adrift of safety. Under Maamria's management, the club won eight out of their next 10 matches, including a nine-match unbeaten run, earning him the National League Manager of the Month for December 2015. He left the club on 14 March 2016, citing family and travel reasons, with Southport in 17th place, eight points above the relegation zone.

=== Nuneaton Town ===
Maamria was appointed as assistant manager to Westley at League Two club Newport County on 10 October 2016. He left the club when Westley was dismissed on 9 March 2017. After leaving Newport, Maamria stated he had received several opportunities to return to football but was waiting for the right role. He was appointed manager of National League North club Nuneaton Town on 28 October 2017. Nuneaton were one place above the relegation zone having won four league matches in the opening two and a half months of the 2017–18 season. Maamria noted the need to manage expectations and identified the defence as an area in need of improvement. A 2–1 win over promotion-chasing Harrogate Town on 9 January 2018 began a 10-match unbeaten run, during which the team conceded six goals. By the time of Maamria's departure to Stevenage in March 2018, Nuneaton had moved to within five points of the play-off positions.

=== Stevenage ===
Having previously played for the club and served as first-team coach and assistant manager in separate spells, Maamria was appointed as manager of League Two club Stevenage on 20 March 2018. At the time of his appointment, he was the only African manager in professional English football. He recorded his first victory as manager on 2 April 2018, when Stevenage defeated local rivals Barnet 4–1 at home. Stevenage recorded mixed results during the 2018–19 season but won five of their final six league matches to finish 10th, one point outside the play-off places. The 2019–20 season began with seven league matches without a win, and Maamria was dismissed on 9 September 2019.

=== Oldham Athletic ===
Maamria was named as head coach of League Two club Oldham Athletic on a two-year contract on 19 September 2019. Under Maamria, Oldham won nine of their 32 matches and were in 19th position when the League Two season was curtailed due to the COVID-19 pandemic in March 2020. He was dismissed on 31 July 2020.

=== Burton Albion ===
Maamria joined League One club Burton Albion as assistant manager to Jimmy Floyd Hasselbaink on 1 January 2021. At the time, Burton were bottom of the league table, having won two matches during the first half of the 2020–21 season. The club won nine of their next 12 league matches, including a six-match winning run between February and March 2021, and finished 16th. Following Hasselbaink's resignation on 5 September 2022, Maamria was initially placed in caretaker charge before being appointed permanent manager the following day. Burton secured League One safety with three games to spare, finishing 15th, but he was dismissed on 9 December 2023 following a six-game winless run.

After leaving Burton, Maamria stated that he had declined several opportunities to return to management. He noted his reputation for stabilising struggling teams, but indicated that he wished his next managerial role to be a longer-term project.

=== Barrow ===
Maamria was appointed head coach of League Two club Barrow on 11 February 2026. At the time of his appointment, the club were in 22nd position, three points above the relegation zone. He was dismissed a month later, on 11 March 2026, after one win in six matches. During his tenure, Barrow lost three matches after conceding in the 89th minute or later. Maamria later expressed disappointment at his departure, stating that he had inherited a squad lacking confidence and had been unable to implement his methods fully because of limited training time.

== Style of play ==
Maamria began his career in an attacking midfield role in Tunisia, and was initially deployed as a winger upon moving to England, including during his first season at Doncaster Rovers. From his second season at Doncaster, he was primarily used as a centre-forward, the position he predominantly occupied for the remainder of his career, apart from a brief period as a central midfielder during his second spell at Stevenage. Maamria was noted for his combative style, having adapted his game in England to adopt a more physical approach, and accumulated over 55 yellow cards and five red cards across his career.

== Career statistics ==
Appearances and goals by club, season and competition
Club	Season	League			FA Cup		Other		Total	
Club	Season	League	Apps	Goals	Apps	Goals	Apps	Goals	Apps	Goals
Glentoran	1996–97	Irish League	7	2	0	0	0	0	7	2
Doncaster Rovers	1998–99	Football Conference	18	3	2	1	0	0	20	4
Doncaster Rovers	1999–2000	Football Conference	35	9	1	0	3 (Note: Appearance(s) in Conference League Cup)	0	39	9
Doncaster Rovers	Total		53	12	3	1	3	0	59	13
Southport	2000–01	Football Conference	25	3	3	1	6 (Note: One appearance and one goal in Conference League Cup; one appearance in FA Trophy; four appearances and seven goals in Lancashire Junior Cup)	8	34	12
Leigh RMI	2001–02	Football Conference	29	12	0	0	2 (Note: Appearance(s) in Football League Trophy)	1	31	13
Leigh RMI	2002–03	Football Conference	25	12	0	0	2	1	27	13
Leigh RMI	Total		54	24	0	0	4	2	58	26
Stevenage Borough	2002–03	Football Conference	11	5	0	0	0	0	11	5
Charleston Battery	2003	USL A-League	9	0	—		0	0	9	0
Stevenage Borough	2003–04	Football Conference	25	9	4	3	3 (Note: One appearance in Football League Trophy; two appearances and one goal in FA Trophy)	1	32	13
Stevenage Borough	2004–05	Conference National	29	10	0	0	4 (Note: One appearance and one goal in Conference League Cup; three appearances and two goals in 2005 Conference National play-offs)	3	33	13
Stevenage Borough	2005–06	Conference National	30	7	1	0	0	0	31	7
Stevenage Borough	Total		84	26	5	3	7	4	96	33
Southport	2006–07	Conference National	17	6	1	0	2 (Note: Appearance(s) in FA Trophy)	0	20	6
Rushden & Diamonds	2006–07	Conference National	4	1	0	0	1 (Note: Appearance(s) in Northamptonshire Senior Cup)	0	5	1
Southport (loan)	2006–07	Conference National	10	2	0	0	0	0	10	2
Northwich Victoria	2007–08	Conference Premier	11	0	0	0	0	0	11	0
Stevenage (Note: The club dropped the word 'Borough' from their name before the 2010–11 season)	2008–09	Conference Premier	1	0	0	0	0	0	1	0
Stevenage	2009–10	Conference Premier	0	0	0	0	0	0	0	0
Stevenage	2010–11	League Two	0	0	0	0	0	0	0	0
Stevenage	2011–12	League One	0	0	0	0	0	0	0	0
Stevenage	Total		1	0	0	0	0	0	1	0
Career total			286	81	12	5	23	14	321	100

== Managerial statistics ==
As of match played 10 March 2026

Managerial record by team and tenure
Team	From	To	Record					Ref.
Team	From	To	P	W	D	L	Win %	Ref.
Northwich Victoria	19 October 2007	23 October 2008	45	13	11	21	28.9	
Southport	19 November 2015	14 March 2016	22	9	5	8	40.9	
Nuneaton Town	28 October 2017	20 March 2018	22	10	5	7	45.5	
Stevenage	20 March 2018	9 September 2019	69	24	15	30	34.8	
Oldham Athletic	19 September 2019	31 July 2020	32	9	10	13	28.1	
Burton Albion	6 September 2022	9 December 2023	73	27	17	29	37.0	
Barrow	11 February 2026	11 March 2026	6	1	1	4	16.7	
Total			269	93	64	112	34.6	

== Honours ==
=== Player ===
AS Marsa

- Tunisian President Cup: 1993–94

Stevenage

- FA Trophy: 2008–09

=== Manager ===
Individual

- Conference Premier Manager of the Year: 2007–08
