= Youssef Zouaoui =

Tunisian footballer (born 1946)

Personal information
- Date of birth: 11 September 1946 (age 80)
- Place of birth: Bizerte, French Tunisia

Youth career
- CA Bizertin

Senior career*
| Years | Team | Apps | (Gls) |
| 1963–1977 | CA Bizertin | 235 | (63) |

International career
- Tunisia

Managerial career
- 1982–1984: CA Bizertin
- 1984–1986: Tunisia
- 1986–1987: CA Bizertin
- 1987: United Arab Emirates
- 1988: CA Bizertin
- 1989–1992: CA Bizertin
- 1992–1993: Club Africain
- 1993–1994: Tunisia
- 1995–1996: Sharjah
- 1997: CA Bizertin
- 1997–2001: Espérance ST
- 2002: Stade Tunisien (caretaker)
- 2002: Tunisia
- 2003: Al Qadsiah
- 2004: Espérance ST
- 2004–2005: Sharjah
- 2005: Club Africain
- 2005–2007: Al-Shaab
- 2007: Al-Ahli Dubai
- 2008: Espérance ST
- 2008–2009: Sharjah
- 2009: Al-Shaab
- 2010–2011: CA Bizertin
- 2011: Al-Ittifaq
- 2011: Al-Shaab
- 2012–2014: Tunisia (technical director)
- 2015–2016: CA Bizertin
- 2019: CA Bizertin (sporting director)
- * Club domestic league appearances and goals

Youssef Zouaoui (Arabic: يُوسُف الزَّوَاوِيّ; born 11 September 1946) is a Tunisian former footballer, who played for major clubs and the Tunisia national team, before becoming a coach. Zouaoui was also a big player in the CA Bizerte (CAB), and remains the second leading scorer in the club's history.

Early attracted by football, he followed his elder brother Larbi Zouaoui by signing with CAB. His qualities of striker and scorer he can be part of the team of juniors and seniors to join the cabinet in 1963, continuing his career until 1977. He knows, however, no international career and played only during a few meetings with Tunisia national football team, due to the presence of major players such as Tahar Chaïbi, Ezzedine Chakroun or Mohamed Ali Akid.

His playing career ended, he chose that of coach. From his second season as head of the CAB team, he created a stir by winning the Tunisia championship football. It is then called upon the national team and, despite the veto cons of corporate players like Tarak Dhiab or Hedi Bayari, it gives excellent results. Dismissed in 1986, he joined the Federation of UAE football as national coach. Revenue Tunisia expand its ranking by national and continental titles, he resumed his place in the national team in 1993, with less success, as shown with the disastrous start of the team at the 1994 African Cup of Nations, which earned him a second dismissal.

Called to lead the Espérance Sportive de Tunis where Slim Chiboub it provides all conditions for success, winning numerous national titles but failed in the CAF Champions League. He leads the national team for the third time in 2002 instead of Ammar Souyah and Khemais Labidi, as technical director.

He has also been technical director of Tunisia.

== Honours ==
=== CA Bizertin ===
- Tunisian League (1): 1983–84
- Tunisian Cup (1): 1987

=== Club Africain ===
- Afro-Asian Club Championship (1): 1993

=== Espérance Tunis ===
- Tunisian League (4): 1997–98, 1998–99, 1999–00, 2000–01
- Tunisian Cup (1): 1999
- CAF Cup (1): 1997
- African Cup Winners' Cup (1): 1998

=== Stade Tunisien ===
- Arab Cup Winners' Cup (1): 2002

== Records ==
=== Player stats ===
- Tunisian Ligue Professionnelle 1: 235 matches and 63 goals;
- Tunisian President Cup: 28 games and 18 goals.

=== National teams managing record ===
| Team | Tenure | Played | Won | Drawn | Lost | Win % | Tournaments |
|---|---|---|---|---|---|---|---|
| Tunisia | 1984–1986 | 24 | 13 | 3 | 8 | 54.16 | 1986 Africa Cup of Nations – Failed to qualify 1986 FIFA World Cup – Failed to qualify |
| Tunisia | 1993–1994 | 13 | 4 | 6 | 3 | 30.76 | 1994 African Cup of Nations — Group Stage |
| Tunisia | 2002 | 2 | 0 | 2 | 0 | 0.00 | |
| United Arab Emirates | 1987 | ? | ? | ? | ? | ? | |
| Totals | | 39 | 17 | 11 | 11 | 43.58 | |
