= 1982–83 Tunisian Cup =

1982–83 Coupe de Tunisie
Tournament details
- Country: Tunisia

Final positions
- Champions: Étoile Sportive du Sahel
- Runners-up: AS Marsa

Tournament statistics
- Matches played: 31
- Goals scored: 83 (2.68 per match)
- Top goal scorer(s): Hamma Trabelsi; Néjib Limam; Faouzi Ben Farhat; Samir Ben Messaoud; Hédi Bayari (3 goals)

The 1982–83 Tunisian Cup (Coupe de Tunisie) was the 27th season of the football cup competition of Tunisia. The competition was organized by the Fédération Tunisienne de Football (FTF) and open to all clubs in Tunisia.

== Round of 32 ==
9 January 1983	CS Korba	1–3	Espérance de Tunis
	Sassi 67'		Mtaallah 23' (o.g.); Latrach 50'; Tarak Dhiab 52'	Referee: Ben Khédija

== Round of 16 ==
27 February 1983	Stade Gabèsien	0–1	Club Africain
			Bayari 14'

27 February 1983	Patriote de Sousse	1–0	Stade nabeulien
	Ben Brahim 60'			Referee: Khelifi

27 February 1983	Étoile Sportive du Sahel	3–1	Sfax Railways Sports	Sousse
	Hsoumo 43' (pen.); Trabelsi 59', 75'		Bouraoui 44'	Stadium: Stade Olympique de Sousse; Referee: Neji Jouini

27 February 1983	AS Marsa	3–0	El Ahly Mateur
	Zarrouk 30'; Jebali 50'; Limam 56'			Referee: Oueslati

27 February 1983	OC Kerkennah	1–0	GS Bekalta
	Ben Salah 20'			Referee: Ouertani

27 February 1983	Olympique Béja	0–0 (a.e.t.) (4–3 p)	CS Hammam-Lif

27 February 1983	CS Makthar	0–1	Stade Tunisien
			Ben Miled 52'

27 February 1983	Espérance de Tunis	1–0	US Monastir	Tunis
	Tarak Dhiab 89'			Stadium: Stade El Menzah

== Quarter-finals ==
20 March 1983	Stade Tunisien	3–0	OC Kerkennah
	Ncibi 34'; Cherif 63'; Limam 85' (pen.)			Referee: Hafedh Haj Hamida

20 March 1983	Olympique Béja	0–0 (a.e.t.) (1–3 p)	Etoile du Sahel
				Referee: Ali Bin Nasser

20 March 1983	Patriote de Sousse	2–4	AS Marsa
	Triter 53'; Terd 60'		Kastalli 26', 70'; Zayat 33'; Ben Messaoud 76'	Referee: Oueslati

20 March 1983	Club Africain	3–1 (a.e.t.)	Espérance de Tunis	Tunis
	Abdelli 90'; Sghaïer 100'; Bayari 117'		Sghaïer 49' (o.g.)	Stadium: Stade El Menzah

== Semi-finals ==
22 May 1983	Étoile Sportive du Sahel	0–0 (a.e.t.) (6–5 p)	Stade Tunisien	Sousse
				Stadium: Stade Olympique de Sousse; Referee: Belaïd Lacarne (Algeria)

22 May 1983	AS Marsa	1–0	Club Africain
	Jebali 1'			Referee: Mohamed Hansal (Algeria)

== Final ==
5 June 1983

Étoile Sportive du Sahel	2–1 (a.e.t.)	AS Marsa
Jamel Garna 35'; Kamel Gabsi 93'		Mohamed Gasri 37'

Stade El Menzah, Tunis
Referee: Ali Bin Nasser

GK	(Tunisia) Mondher Mhiri
DF	(Tunisia) Fethi Bouhallala
DF	(Tunisia) Salem Jaziri
DF	(Tunisia) Habib Cherif
DF	(Tunisia) Abderrazak Chebbi
MF	(Tunisia) Ridha Belkhiria	(substituted off) ?'
MF	(Tunisia) Lotfi Hassoumi
MF	(Tunisia) Fethi Boudriga
MF	(Tunisia) Kamel Gabsi
FW	(Tunisia) Khemais Ben Fattoum
FW	(Tunisia) Jamel Garna	(substituted off) ?'
Substitutes :
FW	(Tunisia) Hamma Trabelsi	(substituted on) ?'
DF	(Tunisia) Riadh Amara	(substituted on) ?'
Manager :
(Tunisia) Mohsen Habacha

GK	(Tunisia) Lassâad Gasri
DF	(Tunisia) Mohamed Gasri
DF	(Tunisia) Marzawan Nechi
DF	(Tunisia) Hassen Hicheri
DF	(Tunisia) Amor Jebali
MF	(Tunisia) Taoufik Maârouffi
MF	(Tunisia) Hichem Mannaï
FW	(Tunisia) Taoufik Jouini	(substituted off) ?'
FW	(Tunisia) Samir Ben Messaoud
MF	(Tunisia) Faouzi Merzouki
FW	(Tunisia) Ezzeddine Gharbi	(substituted off) ?'
Substitutes :
MF	(Tunisia) Hamouda Damoussi	(substituted on) ?'
FW	(Tunisia) Faouzi Zayat	(substituted on) ?'
Manager :
(Tunisia) Taoufik Ben Othman

Assistant referees:
Habib Akrout
Naceur Kraiem
Fourth official:
Mongi Hechmi

Match rules

- 90 minutes.
- 30 minutes of extra time if necessary
- Penalty shoot-out if scores level.
- Seven named substitutes, of which up to three may be used.

== See also ==
- 1982–83 Tunisian National Championship
