= Tarak Dhiab =

Tunisian footballer and politician (born 1954)

- طَارِق ذِيَاب
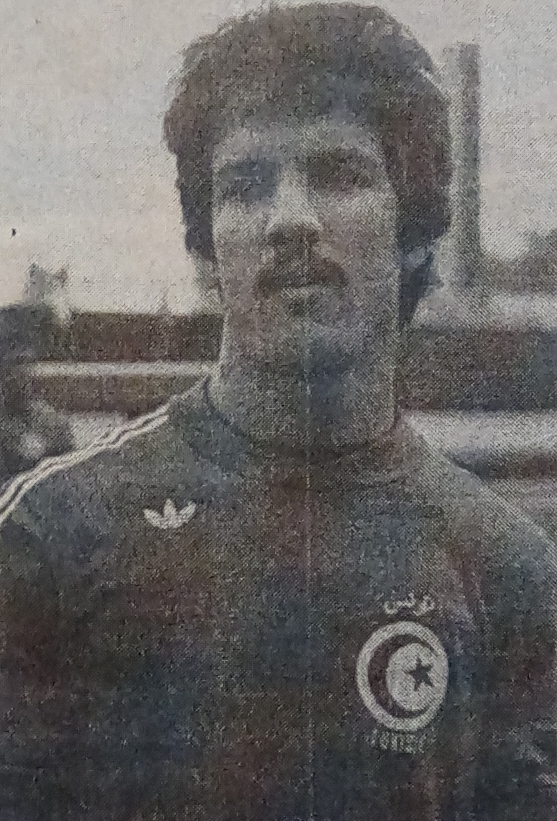
- Dhiab with Tunisia in 1980.

Minister of Youth and Sports
- In office 24 December 2011 – 29 January 2014
- Prime Minister: Hamadi Jebali; Ali Larayedh
- Preceded by: Slim Chaker
- Succeeded by: Saber Bouatay

Personal details
- Born: 15 January 1954 (age 72) Tunis, Tunisia
- Party: Independent
- Occupation: Politician; footballer
Association football career
- Position: Attacking midfielder
Senior career*
Years	Team	Apps	(Gls)
1972–1978	ES Tunis	155	(43)
1978–1980	Al-Ahli SC		(21)
1980–1990	ES Tunis	272	(84)
International career
1974–1990	Tunisia	89	(12)
- * Club domestic league appearances and goals

Tarak Dhiab (Arabic: طَارِق ذِيَاب; born 15 January 1954) is a Tunisian former footballer and politician. The African Footballer of the Year in 1977, he is listed by the Tunisian Football Federation as having 107 caps for the Tunisia national team, although this number has not been ratified by FIFA. At the 1978 FIFA World Cup, he was a member of the Tunisia national team that became the first national team from Africa to win a World Cup match. Dhiab was chosen as the Tunisian footballer of the 20th century. He has served as Minister of Youth and Sports under Prime Minister Hamadi Jebali between 24 December 2011 and 29 January 2014.

== Football career ==
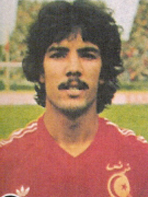
Dhiab in 1978.

Playmaker and strategist of the Tunisia national team during the 1978 FIFA World Cup in Argentina, he learned football in the first football school set up by Abderrahman Ben Azzedine in 1966 and had Hédi Bayari and Lotfi Laâroussi as classmates. He won the schools championship in 1967, before joining AS d'Ariana, then trained at the Espérance Sportive de Tunis where he continued his entire career. He is the only Tunisian player to win the African Footballer of the Year in 1977. Wearing the number 10, he was skilled and appreciated in Tunisia.

In Saudi Arabia, where he played for two seasons, he managed to win the Golden Ball. In 1987, on the occasion of his return to the national team, he managed to qualify Tunisia for the 1988 Summer Olympics by scoring two goals against the Morocco. In 1990, he said goodbye to the national team after a match against England 1−1. In January 1992, during a match between Espérance Sportive de Tunis and Juventus, Dhiab participated in the first 35 minutes of the match and showed off his talent one last time.

In 2000, he was voted the best Tunisian footballer of the 20th century. After hanging up his boots, he opened a sports goods store and chaired the AS d'Ariana, before opting for the job of sports consultant on the BeIN Sports television channel. In coverage relating to the 2006 FIFA World Cup, Dhiab was mentioned as Tunisia's "World Cup legend" by the BBC and as one of Tunisia's greatest World Cup players by the CBC. In 2020, he made his return there after a suspension.

== Political career ==
On 24 December 2011, Dhiab became Minister of Youth and Sports in the government of Hamadi Jebali, where he was assisted by a Secretary of State, Hichem Ben Jemaa. He was reappointed to the government of Ali Larayedh, where he was assisted by another Secretary of State, Fethi Touzri. Expected to be an Ennahda candidate for the 2014 Tunisian parliamentary election in the first constituency of Tunis, he did not register on the electoral lists within the required time limit to be able to apply for an elective mandate1; he was finally replaced by Nadhir Ben Ammou. His name appears on the list of ministers proposed by Habib Jemli, on 2 January 2020, as Minister of Youth and Sports.

== Controversies ==
In May 2008, he was appointed vice-president of Espérance Sportive de Tunis, responsible for the football section. On 6 July, he made headlines by not shaking the hand of Sports Minister Abdallah Kaâbi during the presentation of the Tunisian Cup, after having criticised the management of incidents on the sidelines of a third division match. According to him, it was the minister who had looked away as he was about to shake his hand. He was dismissed from his duties on 11 July, while most Tunisian newspapers did not comment on the affair, and briefly arrested on 14 July, as he was leaving the club's training grounds, on the grounds that his vehicle insurance was not in order. In October, he was sentenced to a one-month suspended prison sentence and a fine of 300 dinars for traffic offences, blasphemous remarks and attempted bribing of a police officer; he described the trial as a "set-up".

=== Conflict with the TFF ===
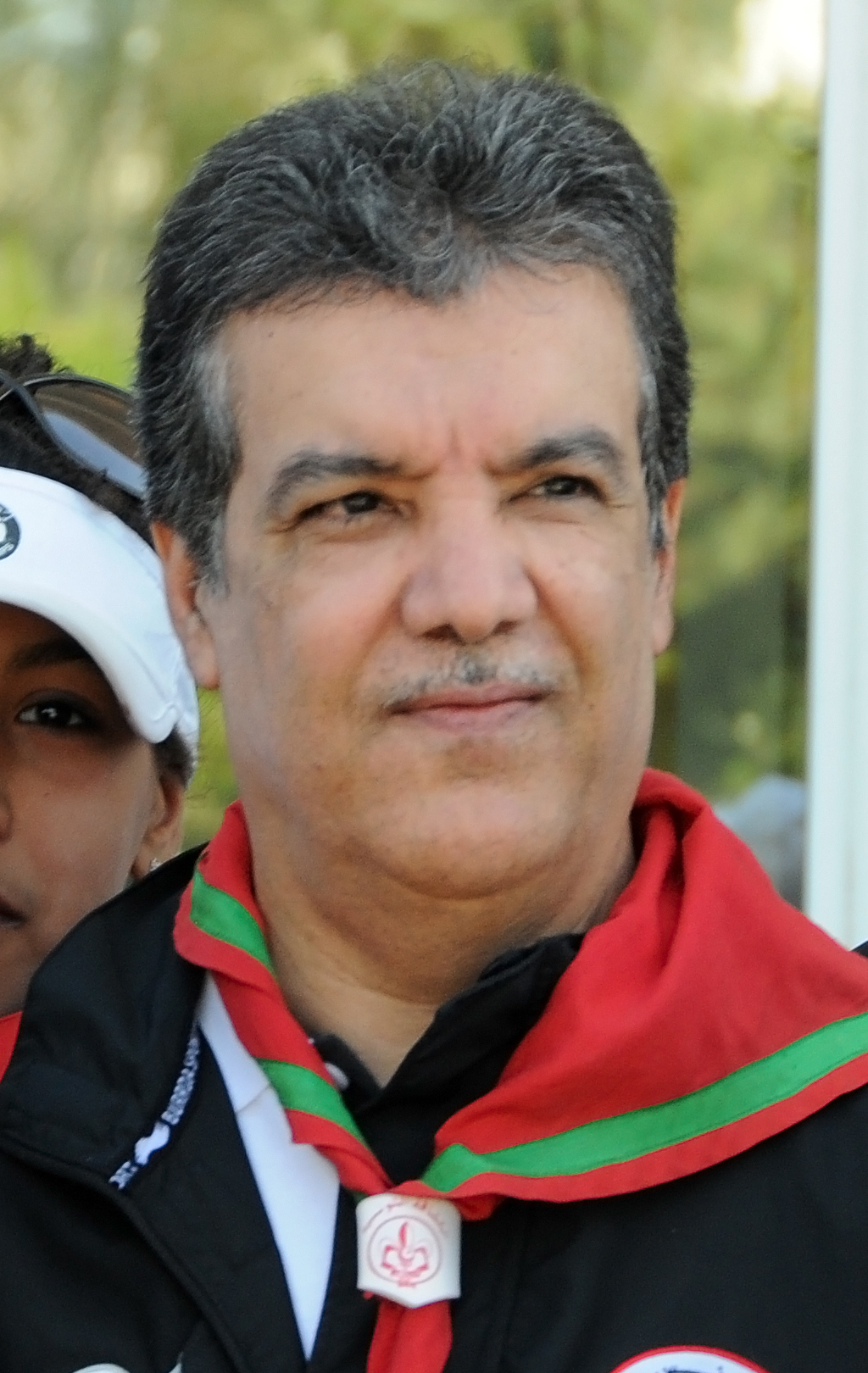
Dhiab as Minister of Youth and Sports in 2012.

A disagreement arises between the minister and the president of the Tunisian Football Federation (TFF), Wadie Jary, on the basis of the choice of the national coach. Indeed, with the support of FIFA, which prohibits any political interference in the affairs of the federations, Jary does not consult the minister and hires Mokhtar Tlili as a special advisor and Nabil Maâloul as coach. However, both are members of a political party, Nidaa Tounes, the main opponent of the Ennahda in power, and long-time opponents of Dhiab and his ally Khaled Ben Yahia, whom he proposed to appoint as head of the national team.

The minister concludes that Jary is declaring war on him, forgetting that the absolute independence of the federations advocated by FIFA does not apply here because the federation is financially dependent on the government. Tlili's appointment to an ambiguous position, alongside an armada of coaches and technicians, is considered a sign of mismanagement on the part of the federation, which considers that it is not accountable to the ministry, which must simply finance its budget. The conflict is making headlines and both sides are hurling insults at each other. Taking advantage of the national team's provisional elimination from the 2014 FIFA World Cup, after a defeat against Cape Verde, the ministry wrote to FIFA to complain about the federation's abuses and ask for its opinion.

After Jary's complaint to Rached Ghannouchi, president of Ennahda, Hédi Benzarti, member of the Nidaa Tounes steering committee and president of the club presidents' association, presented demands for subsidies and imposed the postponement of the resumption of competitions until these demands were met in order to put the minister in a difficult position. Some even spy on the minister's meeting with the third division clubs; Karim Hani, president of the US Sbeïtla, admits to having given Jary a recording of this meeting. However, Maâloul's resignation, the miraculous qualification of the national team, Jary's response to FIFA in which he denies the interference of the ministry and the intervention of the head of government temporarily calm the situation.

== Personal life ==
Dhiab is now a television football analyst. He is also a businessman, and Tunisian magazine Réalités reported in 2004 that he was trying to start his own satellite sports channel. He works as a TV presenter and sports analyst for beIN Sports MENA in Doha, Qatar.

== Honours ==
ES Tunis

- Tunisian Ligue: 1974–75, 1975–76, 1981–82, 1984–85, 1987–88, 1988–89
- Tunisian Cup: 1978–79, 1979–80, 1985–86, 1988–89

Al-Ahli Saudi

- King's Cup: 1979

Individual

- Best African Footballer of the Year in 1977
- Best player of the Saudi Professional League in 1983
- Best Tunisian player of the century
