= Hammadi Daou =

Tunisian football manager

Personal information
- Date of birth: July 2, 1968 (age 58)

Team information
- Current team: Étoile Sportive du Sahel (manager)

Managerial career
- Years: Team
- 2012–2013: CS Sfaxien (assistant)
- 2013: Tunisia (assistant)
- 2013–2014: CS Sfaxien
- 2014: Stade Gabèsien
- 2015: EGS Gafsa
- 2015–2016: Damac FC
- 2016–2017: CS Sfaxien (technical director)
- 2017: EO Sidi Bouzid
- 2017–2018: USM El Harrach
- 2018: DRB Tadjenanet
- 2019–2020: US Tataouine
- 2021: CS Sfaxien
- 2023-2024: Stade Tunisien
- 2024: Étoile Sportive du Sahel

Hammadi Daou (born 2 July 1968) is a Tunisian football manager.

== Honours ==
=== Managerial ===
CS Sfaxien

- Tunisian Cup: 2020–21

Stade Tunisien

- Tunisian Cup: 2023–24
