= Kamel Zouaghi =

Tunisian football manager

Personal information
- Date of birth: 3 May 1971 (age 55)

Team information
- Current team: Al-Ahli Club (manager)

Managerial career
- Years: Team
- 2008–2009: Kawkab Marrakech
- 2009: Olympic Safi
- 2011: EGS Gafsa
- 2012: ES Beni-Khalled
- 2012: Olympique Béja
- 2012: ES Zarzis
- 2012–2013: Olympique Béja
- 2014–2015: CA Khénifra
- 2015: CRA Hoceima
- 2016: AS Kasserine
- 2016–2017: CS Hammam-Lif
- 2017: Olympique Béja
- 2017–2018: CA Khénifra
- 2018–2019: Ittihad Tanger
- 2019: Al-Ansar FC
- 2020–: Al-Ahli Club

Kamel Zouaghi (born 3 May 1971) is a Tunisian football manager.
