= 2019–20 Tunisian Cup =

Habib Bourguiba Cup
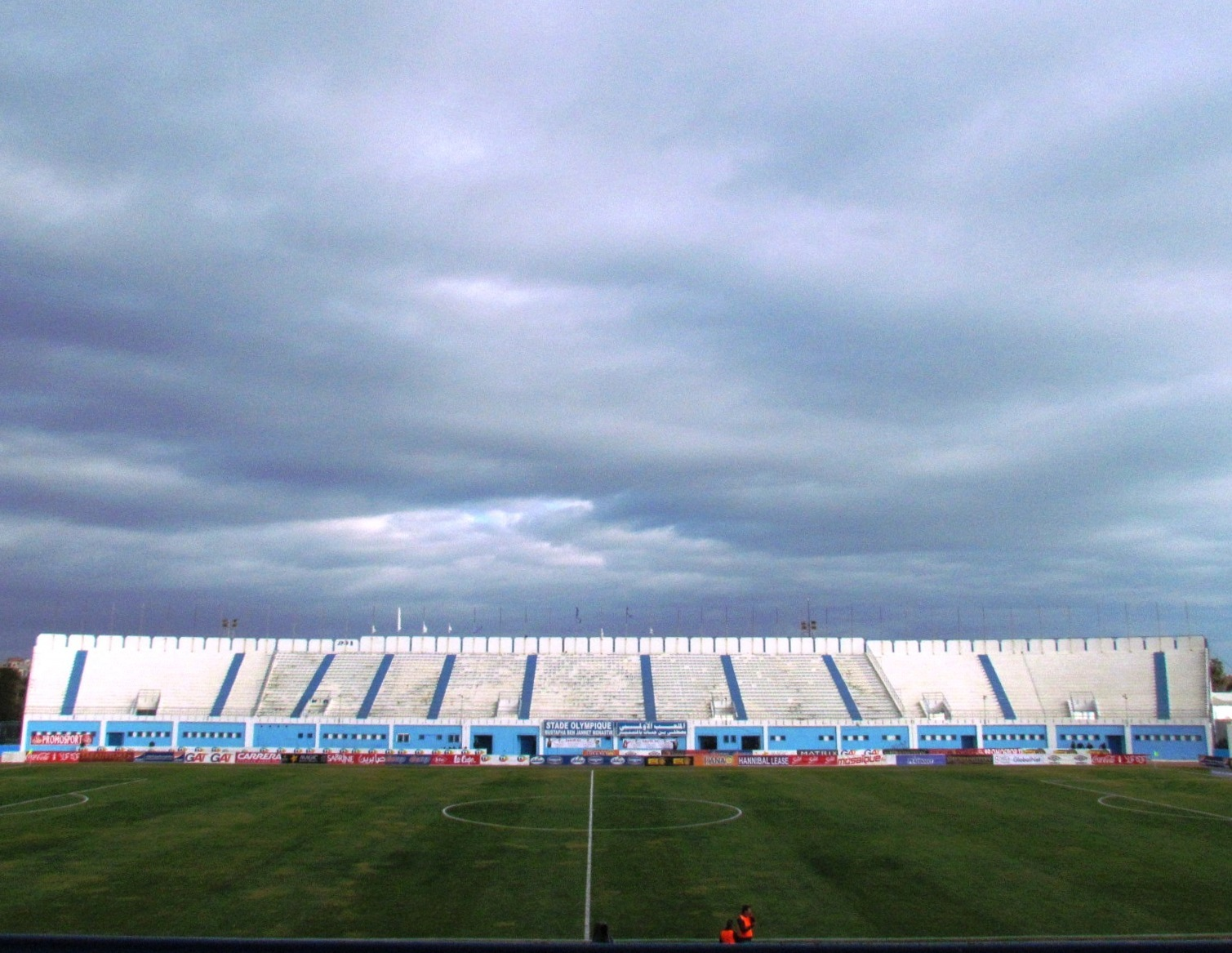
- Mustapha Ben Jannet Stadium hosted the final

Tournament details
- Country: Tunisia

Final positions
- Champions: Union Monastirienne (1st title)
- Runners-up: Espérance de Tunis

Tournament statistics
- Top goal scorer(s): Oussama Boughanmi; Zied Aloui (3 goals each)

The 2019–20 Tunisian Cup (Coupe de Tunisie) or Habib Bourguiba Cup was the 88th season of the football cup competition of Tunisia. The competition was organized by the Fédération Tunisienne de Football (FTF) and open to all clubs in Tunisia.

== First round ==
Match Date	Team 1	Team 2	Score 90 min	Score Extra Time	Penalties
8 November 2019	Sfax Railways Sports	Étoile de Radès	2–0		
9 November 2019	Sporting Ben Arous	Stade Gabèsien	0–0	1–0	
9 November 2019	Association d'Ariana	Avenir de Gabès	2–2	3–2	
10 November 2019	Olympique Sidi Bouzid	Espoir de Hammam Sousse	1–1	1–1	2–3
10 November 2019	Club de Menzel Bouzelfa	Espérance de Zarzis	0–0	0–2	
10 November 2019	Olympique Béja	Avenir de Sbikha	1–1	1–1	3–4
10 November 2019	Avenir de Rejiche	Stade Africain Menzel Bourguiba	2–1		
10 November 2019	Stade Sfaxien	Jendouba Sport	1–2		
10 November 2019	Avenir d'Oued Ellil	Olympique Médenine	1–1	1–1	3–2
10 November 2019	Croissant de M'saken	Association de Djerba	1–1	2–3	
10 November 2019	El Gawafel de Gafsa	Avenir de Kasserine	2–1		
10 November 2019	Espoir de Djerba	Avenir de Marsa	1–2		

== Second round ==
Match Date	Team 1	Team 2	Score 90 min	Score Extra time	Penalties
Withdrawn	Zitouna de Chammakh	Club de Jebeniana			
4 January 2020	Étoile La Goulette et Kram	Grombalia Sports	1–1	1–2	
4 January 2020	Astre d'Agareb	Club Hilalien	2–0		
4 January 2020	FC Menzel Temime	Baâth de Sidi Amor Bouhajla	0–0	0–0	4–3
5 January 2020	Océano de Kerkennah	Association de Djerba	0–1		
5 January 2020	Association d'Ariana	Palme de Tozeur	3–0		
5 January 2020	Sporting Moknine	Avenir de Marsa	1–2		
5 January 2020	Avenir de Sbikha	Sfax Railways Sports	1–0		
5 January 2020	El Gawafel de Gafsa	Espérance de Zarzis	1–0		
5 January 2020	Sporting Ben Arous	Espoir de Rogba	3–0		
5 January 2020	Avenir d'Oued Ellil	Jendouba Sport	0–0	0–0	5–4
5 January 2020	Lion de Ksibet Sousse	Avenir de Rejiche	0–2		
5 January 2020	Olympique des Transports	Union de Borj El Amri	1–1	1–1	3–4
5 January 2020	Ahly Sfaxien	Wided d'El Hamma	0–1		
5 January 2020	Club de Korba	Al Ahly Hajri	1–0		
5 January 2020	Kalâa Sport	El Makarem de Mahdia	2–0		
5 January 2020	Espoir de Hammam Sousse	Union de Bou Salem	0–1		
5 January 2020	El Maâli de Sejnane	Jeunesse de Tebourba	2–0		

== Round of 32 ==
Date	Team 1	Team 2	Score 90 min	Score Extra Time	Penalties
28 February 2020	Union de Borj El Amri	Kalâa Sport	0–0	0–1	
29 February 2020	Union de Tataouine	Association d'Ariana	4–2		
29 February 2020	Croissant Chebbien	Union de Ben Guerdane	0–0	0–0	5–4
29 February 2020	Jeunesse Kairouanaise	Club Africain	0–3		
29 February 2020	El Maâli de Sejnane	Wided d'El Hamma	1–1	1–1	6–7
29 February 2020	FC Menzel Temime	Sporting Ben Arous	1–2		
1 March 2020	Association de Djerba	Club de Hammam-Lif	3–2		
1 March 2020	Avenir de Rejiche	Club Sfaxien	1–1	1–1	2–3
1 March 2020	Union de Bou Salem	El Gawafel de Gafsa	0–1		
1 March 2020	Astre d'Agareb	Avenir de Marsa	0–0	0–1	
1 March 2020	Étoile de Métlaoui	Avenir d'Oued Ellil	1–0		
1 March 2020	Grombalia Sports	Club Bizertin	0–4		
1 March 2020	Zitouna de Chammakh	Union Monastirienne	0–1		
1 March 2020	Stade Tunisien	Avenir de Soliman	1–0		
11 March 2020	Avenir de Sbikha	Espérance de Tunis	0–2		
11 March 2020	Club de Korba	Étoile du Sahel	2–2	2–2	3–5

== Round of 16 ==
Match Date	Team 1	Team 2	Score 90 min	Score Extra Time	Penalties
15 March 2020	El Gawafel de Gafsa	Stade Tunisien	3–1		
15 March 2020	Union Monastirienne	Club Africain	1–0		
15 March 2020	Club Bizertin	Union de Tataouine	1–1	1–1	2–4
15 March 2020	Croissant Chebbien	Sporting Ben Arous	3–1		
15 March 2020	Étoile de Métlaoui	Étoile du Sahel	1–1	2–2	3–1
15 March 2020	Association de Djerba	Club Sfaxien	0–2		
15 March 2020	Kalâa Sport	Wided d'El Hamma	1–0		
15 March 2020	Avenir de Marsa	Espérance de Tunis	0–2		

== Quarter-finals ==
Match Date	Team 1	Team 2	Score 90 min	Score Extra Time	Penalties
16 September 2020	El Gawafel de Gafsa	Union Monastirienne	2–3		
16 September 2020	Union de Tataouine	Croissant Chebbien	0–0	1–1	1–4
16 September 2020	Étoile de Métlaoui	Club Sfaxien	0–1		
16 September 2020	Kalâa Sport	Espérance de Tunis	1–2		

== Semi-finals ==
Match Date	Team 1	Team 2	Score 90 min	Score Extra Time	Penalties
23 September 2020	Club Sfaxien	Union Monastirienne	0–0	0–1	
23 September 2020	Croissant Chebbien	Espérance de Tunis	0–2		

== Final ==
Match Date	Team 1	Team 2	Score 90 min	Score Extra Time	Penalties
27 September 2020	Union Monastirienne	Espérance de Tunis	2–0		

== See also ==
- 2019–20 Tunisian Ligue Professionnelle 1
- 2019–20 Tunisian Ligue Professionnelle 2
- 2019–20 Tunisian Super Cup
