= Salah Chaoua =

Tunisian footballer (1946–2020)

Personal information
- Date of birth: 24 August 1946
- Place of birth: Tunis, French Tunisia
- Date of death: 11 August 2020 (aged 73)
- Position: Forward

Senior career*
Years	Team	Apps	(Gls)
1962–1971	Club Africain		
1971–1977	Al-Madina SC		

International career
1966–1967	Tunisia	6	(0)
- * Club domestic league appearances and goals

Salah Chaoua (24 August 1946 – 11 August 2020) was a Tunisian footballer.

Chaoua played at the forward position for Club Africain in Tunisia and Al-Madina SC in Libya. He also played in six games for the Tunisian national team.

== Awards ==
- Champion of the Tunisian Ligue Professionnelle 1 (1964, 1967)
- Winner of the Tunisian Cup (1965, 1967, 1968, 1969, 1970)
- Winner of the Maghreb Cup Winners Cup (1971)
- Champion of the Libyan Premier League (1976)
- Winner of the Libyan Cup (1976)
