= Ahmed Dhib =

Tunisian footballer and manager

Personal information
- Date of birth: 20 November 1932
- Place of birth: Tunis, Tunisia
- Date of death: 15 November 2009 (aged 76)
- Place of death: Tunisia

Youth career
- En-Najah Sports
- Stade Tunisien
- Club Africain

Senior career*
Years	Team	Apps	(Gls)
- Club Africain

Managerial career
- 1956–1960: En-Najah Sports
- 1962–1965: CO Transports
- 1965–1966: AS La Marsa
- 1966–1967: Tunisia U-21
- 1967–1968: Club Africain
- 1967–1973: CO Transports
- 1973–1976: Espérance Sportive de Tunis
- 1979–1980: Tunisia
- 1981–1982: Espérance Sportive de Tunis
- 1982–1985: CO Transports
- 1985–1986: JS Kairouan
- 1990–1991: CS Hammam-Lif
- * Club domestic league appearances and goals

Ahmed Dhib (Arabic: أحمد ذيب; 20 November 1932 in Tunis-15 November 2009) was a Tunisian football manager.

== Professional career ==
He coached the Tunisia national football team. He also coached CO Transports and Club Sportif de Hammam-Lif.
