= Sadok Sassi =

Tunisian footballer

Attouga
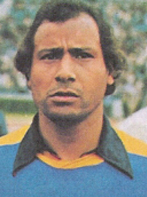
- Sassi with Tunisia in 1977

Personal information
- Full name: Sadok Sassi
- Date of birth: 15 November 1945 (age 80)
- Place of birth: Tunis, Tunisia
- Height: 1.88 m (6 ft 2 in)
- Position: Goalkeeper

Youth career
- Club Africain

Senior career*
| Years | Team | Apps | (Gls) |
| 1962–1979 | Club Africain | 415 | (0) |

International career
| 1963–1978 | Tunisia | 87 | (0) |
- * Club domestic league appearances and goals

Sadok Sassi (Arabic: الصَّادِق سَاسِي), nicknamed "Attouga" (Arabic: عَتُوقَة; born 15 November 1945 in Tunis) is a Tunisian former footballer who played as a goalkeeper for Club Africain and the Tunisia national team.

He played both matches for the Tunisia national team at the 1963 African Cup of Nations.

In a sixteen-years career, Sassi earned an impressive five league titles, eight cups, including three for Tunisia and the Maghreb. In 1972, he was goalkeeper for the African team at the mini-World Cup, hosted by Brazil. As a one-club man, he has 335 appearances in the first Tunisian league, 66 in the Tunisian Cup, and 14 in international competitions. With a total of 415 official matches for Club Africain, Sadok Sassi is the club's record player. Due to his outstanding performances, Attouga is referred to by the club as the eternal number one.

The national team's undisputed first-choice goalkeeper for many years, he missed Tunisia's first World Cup appearance in 1978 through injury, and was replaced by Mokhtar Naili. Sassi earned a total of 116 international caps; however, only 87 matches were considered as A-international by FIFA. He was awarded the African Football's Silver Order of Merit by CAF.

In the prestigious election for CAF African Goalkeeper of the Millennium, Sadok Sassi finished in third place. The two goalkeepers who ranked ahead of him were Cameroonians Thomas N'Kono and Joseph-Antoine Bell. Therefore, Attouga is considered the best Tunisian and North African goalkeeper of the millennium.

After retiring he has worked as a General Manager for Club Africain.

== Honours ==
- Tunisian Championship: 1964, 1967, 1973, 1974, 1979
- Tunisian Cup: 1965, 1967, 1968, 1969, 1970, 1972, 1973, 1976
- North African Champions Cup: 1973, 1974, 1975
- North Africain Cup Winners Cup: 1971

== See also ==
- List of one-club men in association football
