= 2020–21 Tunisian Cup =

Salah Ben Youssef Cup
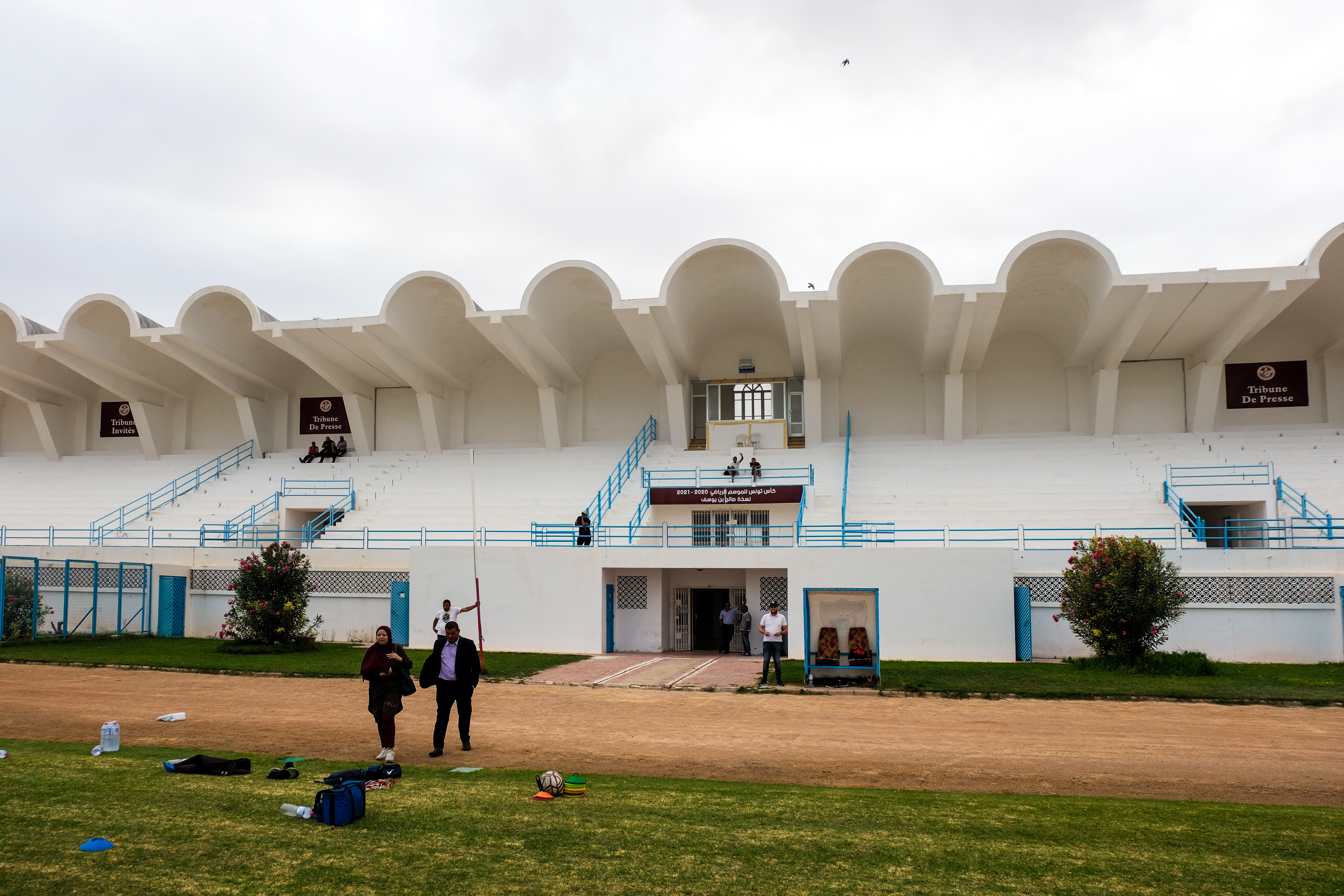
- Midoun Municipal Stadium hosted the final

Tournament details
- Country: Tunisia

Final positions
- Champions: Club Sfaxien (6th title)
- Runners-up: Club Africain

Tournament statistics
- Top goal scorer(s): Zied Aloui (3 goals)

The 2020–21 Tunisian Cup (Coupe de Tunisie) or Salah Ben Youssef Cup was the 89th season of the football cup competition of Tunisia. The competition was organized by the Fédération Tunisienne de Football (FTF) and open to all clubs in Tunisia.

== First round ==
Match date	Team 1	Team 2	Score 90 min	Score Extra Time	Penalties
23 May 2021	Enfida Sports	Club de Rouhia	2–1		
Withdrawn	Espoir de Rogba	Avenir de Gabès			
22 May 2021	Mareth Sport	Espoir de Bou Hajla	1–0		
22 May 2021	Association d'Ariana	Stade Sfaxien	2–0		
22 May 2021	Club de Bembla	Union de Ksibet el-Médiouni	1–1	1–1	5–3
23 May 2021	FC Bizerte	Club de Hammam-Lif	0–3		
22 May 2021	FC Jérissa	Stade Gafsien	1–1	1–1	3–4
Withdrawn	El Makarem de Mahdia	Baâth de Sidi Amor Bouhajla			
Withdrawn	Union de Carthage	El Gawafel de Gafsa			
23 May 2021	Association de Beni Khedache	Corail de Tabarka	0–2		
23 May 2021	Club de Khniss	Espoir de Hammam Sousse	0–2		
23 May 2021	Espoir de Hazoua	Croissant de Redeyef	0–1		
22 May 2021	Al Ahly Sfaxien	Espérance de Zarzis	0–1		
23 May 2021	Relais de Bir Bouregba	Olympique des Transports	1–1	1–1	6–7

== Round of 32 ==
Match date	Team 1	Team 2	Score 90 min	Score Extra Time	Penalties
26 May 2021	Club Africain	Club de Hammam-Lif	3–1		
25 May 2021	El Makarem de Mahdia	Union Monastirienne	2–3		
25 May 2021	Avenir de Soliman	Stade Tunisien	2–1		
26 May 2021	Mareth Sport	Corail de Tabarka	1–2		
26 May 2021	Stade Gafsien	Croissant de Redeyef	0–0	0–0	5–4
26 May 2021	Union de Menzel Bouzaiene	Association d'Ariana	0–2		
26 May 2021	Avenir de Rejiche	Union de Ben Guerdane	0–1		
26 May 2021	Club Sfaxien	Club Bizertin	2–1		
26 May 2021	Olympique des Transports	Espoir de Hammam Sousse	0–0	1–1	7–6
26 May 2021	Enfida Sports	Aigle de Jilma	0–2		
26 May 2021	Espérance de Tunis	Étoile du Sahel	0–1		
25 May 2021	Jeunesse Sportive Kairouanaise	Étoile de Métlaoui	0–0	0–0	4–5
26 May 2021	Espoir de Rogba	Club de Bembla	0–0	0–0	3–5
26 May 2021	Astre de Zaouiet Sousse	Espérance de Zarzis	0–0	0–2	
25 May 2021	Union de Carthage	Union de Borj Cédria	0–0	0–0	4–5
25 May 2021	Olympique Béja	Union de Tataouine	2–0		

== Round of 16 ==
Match date	Team 1	Team 2	Score 90 min	Score Extra Time	Penalties
28 May 2021	Stade Gafsien	Club Sfaxien	0–2		
30 May 2021	Olympique des Transports	Club de Bembla	0–0	0–0	4–3
30 May 2021	Aigle de Jilma	Étoile du Métlaoui	0–1		
28 May 2021	Union de Borj Cédria	Union Monastirienne	1–4		
30 May 2021	Association d'Ariana	Olympique Béja	1–1	1–1	3–4
30 May 2021	Corail de Tabarka	Club Africain	1–2		
30 May 2021	Avenir de Soliman	Union de Ben Guerdane	1–1	1–1	4–2
30 May 2021	Espérance de Zarzis	Étoile du Sahel	1–0		

== Quarter-finals ==
Match date	Team 1	Team 2	Score 90 min	Score Extra Time	Penalties
2 June 2021	Avenir de Soliman	Club Africain	1–2		
2 June 2021	Club Sfaxien	Olympique Béja	1–0		
2 June 2021	Union Monastirienne	Espérance de Zarzis	1–0		
2 June 2021	Olympique des Transports	Étoile du Métlaoui	1–0		

== Semi-finals ==
Match date	Team 1	Team 2	Score 90 min	Score Extra Time	Penalties
20 June 2021	Club Africain	Union Monastirienne	0–0	0–0	3–0
20 June 2021	Olympique des Transports	Club Sfaxien	0–2		

== Final ==
Match date	Team 1	Team 2	Score 90 min	Score Extra Time	Penalties
27 June 2021	Club Africain	Club Sfaxien	0–0	0–0	4–5

== See also ==
- 2020–21 Tunisian Ligue Professionnelle 1
- 2020–21 Tunisian Ligue Professionnelle 2
- 2020–21 Tunisian Super Cup
