= Andrej Prean Nagy =

Footballer (1920–1997)

Personal information
- Date of birth: 6 October 1920
- Place of birth: Vulcan, Romania
- Date of death: 5 September 1997 (aged 73)
- Place of death: Tunis, Tunisia
- Position: Striker

Youth career
- Minerul Vulcan

Senior career*
Years	Team	Apps	(Gls)
1939–1945	Ferencváros	89	(3)
1945	Bayern Munich		
1946–1947	Cannes		
1947–1950	Marseille	68	(22)
1950–1952	Strasbourg	36	(8)
1952–1955	Las Palmas	53	(11)

International career
1943	Hungary	3	(0)

Managerial career
- 1963–1967: Sfax Railways Sports
- 1968: Detroit Cougars
- 1968: Washington Whips
- 1969–1971: Club Africain
- 1974–1975: Tunisia
- 1976–1977: JS Kabylie
- 1977–1981: Club Africain
- 1984–1985: Club Africain
- 1986–1987: Club Sportif de Hammam-Lif
- * Club domestic league appearances and goals

Andrej Prean Nagy (8 September 1923 – 5 September 1997), also referred to as André Nagy or Andras Nagy, was a football player and coach who played for both Ferencváros. Born in Romania, he represented the Hungary national team internationally.

Nagy left the country in 1945, and played abroad for Bayern Munich. He then moved to France where he played first with AS Cannes and then Olympique de Marseille and RC Strasbourg. He joined later Spanish team UD Las Palmas on 18 January 1952 where he played till 1955.

As A coach, Nagy had three stints for Club Africain, Tunis in 1969–71, 1977–81, and 1984–85.

== External links and references ==
- Barreaud, Marc (1998). Dictionnaire des footballeurs étrangers du championnat professionnel français (1932–1997). L'Harmattan, Paris. ISBN 2-7384-6608-7.
- Profile and career stats
- Profile at tempofradi
- Profile at om1899
- Profile at racingstub
- Andrej Prean Nagy at National-Football-Teams.com
