= Rachid Turki =

Tunisian football manager (1918–2003)

Rachid Turki (1918–2003) was a Tunisian football manager. He was the first manager of the Tunisia national team. He also coached CA Bizerte.
