= René Exbrayat =

French football manager (1947–2023)

Personal information
- Date of birth: 30 October 1947
- Place of birth: Arles, France
- Date of death: 29 October 2023 (aged 75)
- Place of death: Arles, France
- Position: Striker

Senior career*
Years	Team	Apps	(Gls)
1968–1972	Arles		
1972–1973	Aix-en-Provence		
1973–1984	Arles		

International career
- France (amateur)

Managerial career
- 1979–1984: Arles
- 1984–1986: Beaucaire
- 1988–1991: Avignon
- 1991–1993: Bastia
- 1993–1994: Nîmes
- 1994–1996: Martigues
- 1996–1997: Le Havre
- 1997–1999: Club Africain
- 1999–2000: Servette
- 2000–2002: Club Africain
- 2003–2004: Al-Nasr (Dubai)
- * Club domestic league appearances and goals

René Exbrayat (30 October 1947 – 29 October 2023) was a French footballer and football manager.

== Career ==
Exbrayat played for Arles and Aix-en-Provence, playing for France amateur national team at the Mediterranean Games.

Exbrayat coached Arles, Beaucaire, Avignon, Bastia, Nîmes, Martigues, Le Havre, Club Africain, Servette and Al-Nasr Dubai.

Exbrayat was also an assistant coach at Rennes.

== Death ==
Exbrayat died in Arles on 29 October 2023, at the age of 75.
