= Mohsen Habacha =

Tunisian footballer (1942–2025)

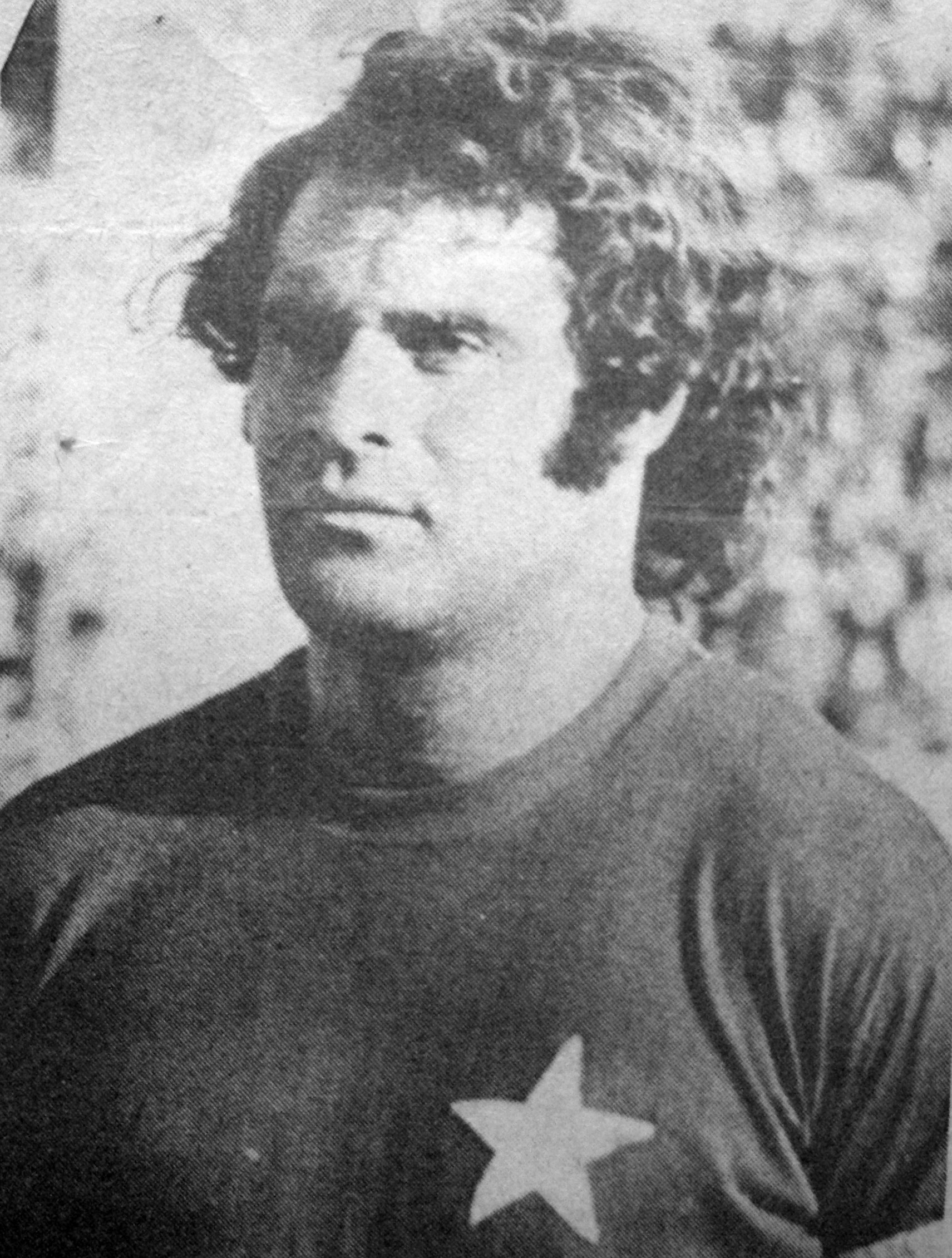
- Habacha playing for ES Sahel in 1973

Personal information
- Date of birth: 25 January 1942
- Place of birth: Sousse, Tunisia
- Date of death: 4 January 2025 (aged 82)
- Place of death: Sousse, Tunisia
- Position: Defender

Senior career*
Years	Team	Apps	(Gls)
1960–1969	ES Sahel		
1969–1970	Ajaccio		
1970–1974	ES Sahel		

International career
1963–1969	Tunisia	48	(6)
- * Club domestic league appearances and goals

Mohsen Habacha (Arabic: محسن حباشة; 25 January 1942 – 4 January 2025) was a Tunisian footballer who played as a defender for Étoile Sportive du Sahel, Ajaccio and the Tunisia national team.

== Career ==
Habacha played for Étoile Sportive du Sahel and the Tunisia national team during the 1960s. He then had a short professional experience between 1969 and 1970 with French club Ajaccio.

He participated in the 1963 Arab Cup in Lebanon, the 1963 Mediterranean Games in Naples and the Africa Cup of Nations 1963 in Ghana and 1965 in Tunisia.

== Death ==
Habacha died on 4 January 2025, at the age of 82.
