= Ammar Souayah =

Tunisian football manager (born 1957)

Personal information
- Date of birth: 11 June 1957 (age 69)
- Place of birth: Tunis, Tunisia

Managerial career
- Years: Team
- 1999–2001: CS Hammam-Lif
- 2001–2005: Étoile du Sahel
- 2002: Tunisia
- 2004–2005: Al-Tai
- 2005–2006: Al-Tai
- 2007: Al Dhafra
- 2007–2009: Al-Hazem
- 2011–2013: Al Raed
- 2013–2014: Al Shabab (U23)
- 2014–2015: Al Shabab
- 2015–2017: Espérance de Tunis
- 2019: Ohod
- 2021–2022: JS Kabylie
- 2024: ES Sétif

Ammar Souayah (Arabic: عمار السويّح; born 11 June 1957) is a Tunisian football manager and former player.

== Playing career ==
Souayah played in the second and third divisions of Tunisia.

== Managerial career ==
=== Tunisia national team ===
In 2002, Ammar Souayah signed as the coach of the Tunisia national team and led the team at the FIFA World Cup. Tunisia began the tournament with a 2–0 defeat against Russia then drew 1–1 against strong Belgium but was defeated 2–0 against co-host Japan and eliminated in the group stage. He coached Club Sportif de Hammam-Lif and Étoile du Sahel.

=== Al-Tai ===
In 2004, Souayah took on his first expatriate role with the Saudi club Al-Tai.

=== Al Shabab Riyadh ===
On 23 January 2014, he was appointed the head coach of Al Shabab, replacing Belgian Emilio Ferrera. He performed well with Al Shabab in the 2014 AFC Champions League group stages. Al Shabab played 6 matches, 5 won and 1 lost.

== Managerial statistics ==
| Team | Nat | From | To | Record | | | | |
|---|---|---|---|---|---|---|---|---|
| Al Shabab | Saudi Arabia | 23 January 2014 | 20 May 2014 | 22 | 12 | 4 | 6 | 54.55 |

== Honours ==
=== Manager ===
Al Shabab

- King Cup of Champions: 2014
