= Ali Selmi =

Tunisian football manager

Ali Selmi is a Tunisian football manager.

In the 1998 FIFA World Cup finals, he took charge of the Tunisia national team for their final group match, after previous manager Henryk Kasperczak was fired after two losses and saw the team eliminated from contention. Tunisia played Romania to a 1–1 draw in that match. Selmi himself was fired shortly thereafter. He later coached AS Marsa.
