= Olympique Béja =

Tunisian association football club

Olympique de Béja
- Full name: Olympique de Béja
- Nickname: El Lampik The Storks
- Short name: OB
- Founded: 17 July 1929; 97 years ago
- Ground: Boujemaa Kmiti Stadium
- Capacity: 15,000
- Chairman: Kamel Ouali
- Manager: Lassaad Maamar
- League: Tunisian Ligue Professionnelle 1
- 2025–26: Ligue 1, 13th of 16
Home colours	Away colours

Olympique de Béja (Arabic: الأولمبي الباجي), known as O Béja or simply OB for short, is a Tunisian football club based in Béja. The club was founded in 1929 and its colours are red and white. Their home stadium, Boujemaa Kmiti Stadium, has a capacity of 15,000 spectators. The club is currently playing in the Tunisian Ligue Professionnelle 1.

== Official Honours ==
Type	Competition	Titles	Winning Seasons
Domestic	Tunisian League 1	0	Best performance: 1997–98 Fifth
Domestic	Tunisian Cup	3	1992-93, 2009–10, 2022–23
Domestic	Tunisian Super Cup	2	1995, 2023
Domestic	Tunisian Ligue Professionnelle 2	3	1984–85, 2005–06, 2019–20

== Appearances in CAF competitions ==
- CAF Confederation Cup: 2 appearances

2011 – First Round
2023-24 – First Round

- CAF Cup Winners' Cup: 2 appearances

1994 – Quarter-Finals
1996 – Second Round

== Current squad ==
As of 15 September 2026

Note: Flags indicate national team as defined under FIFA eligibility rules; some limited exceptions apply. Players may hold more than one non-FIFA nationality.

No.	Pos.	Nation	Player
1	GK	TUN	Hamdi Chairet
2	DF	TUN	Nassim Hasni
3	DF	TUN	Mehrez Ben Rajeh
4	DF	TUN	Islem Chelghoumi
5	DF	TUN	Hamza Mabrouk
6	MF	TUN	Majd Hedhli
8	MF	TUN	Mohamed Nefzi
10	FW	TUN	Mohamed Hadouchi
11	FW	ALG	El Houcine Gafsi
12	MF	CIV	Alpha Sidibé
13	MF	TUN	Mohamed Amine Ammar
14	FW	TUN	Obaid Mekni

No.	Pos.	Nation	Player
16	GK	TUN	Chahine Smaoui
17	FW	TUN	Bechir Hasni
18	DF	TUN	Mohamed Marzouki
19	FW	TUN	Oussama Sayari
20	MF	RWA	Anicet Ishimwe
21	MF	TUN	Firas Fadhli
22	GK	TUN	Ahmed Fatnassi
24	DF	TUN	Youssef Azib
25	DF	GUI	Chérif Camara
26	DF	BEN	Ibrahim Ogoulola
27	FW	TUN	Haythem Mbarek
29	FW	CMR	Ravel Djoumekou

== Former coaches ==
- Mustapha Dhib (1956–60)
- Gustave Ducoussou (1960–62)
- Noureddine Ben Mahmoud (1962–65)
- Giuseppe Moro (1965–67)
- Todor (1967–68)
- Skander Medelji (1968–69)
- Noureddine Ben Mahmoud (1969–70)
- Frank Loscey (1970–71)
- Ali Rached (1971–72)
- Taoufik Ben Othman (1973–74)
- Abderrazak Nouaïli (1974–76)
- Slobodan (1976–78)
- Ahmed Mghirbi (1978–79)
- Jamel Eddine Bouabsa (1979–80)
- Mustapha Jouili (1980–81)
- Larbi Zouaoui (1981–82)
- Apostal (1982–83)
- Belhassen Meriah (1983–84)
- Mrad Hamza (1984–85)
- Ali Selmi (1985–86)
- Lotfi Benzarti (1986–88)
- Beliakov (1988–89)
- Beliakov (1989–90)
- Habib Mejri (1990–91)
- Amor Dhib (1991–92)
- Platek (1992–93)
- Riadh Charfi (1993–94)
- Alexandru Moldovan (1994–95)
- Mokhtar Tlili (1995–96)
- Ali Fergani (1996–98)
- Abdelghani Djadaoui (1998–99)
- Ali Fergani (1999–00)
- Fethi Toukabri (2000–01)
- Ali Selmi (2001–02)
- Ridha Akacha (2002–03)
- Kamel Mouassa (2003–04)
- Alexandru Moldovan (2004–05)
- Fethi Toukabri (2005–06)
- Ridha Akacha (2006–07)
- Mohamed Kouki (2007–08)
- Mahmoud Ouertani (2008–09)
- Khaled Ben Sassi (2009)
- Rachid Belhout (Oct 3, 2009 – Dec 19, 2010)
- Sofiène Hidoussi (Dec 22, 2010 – April 28, 2011)
- Hedi Mokraini (April 28, 2011 – Nov 14, 2011)
- Said Hammouche (Sept 19, 2011 – Nov 1, 2011)
- Amor Dhib (Nov 14, 2011 – March 12, 2012)
- Fethi Laabidi (March 12, 2012 – May 8, 2012)
- F. Ouerghi (interim) (May 9, 2012 – May 12, 2012)
- Kamel Zouaghi (May 13, 2012 – Aug 6, 2012)
- Mokhtar Arfaoui (Aug 8, 2012 – Dec 9, 2012)
- Kamel Zouaghi (Dec 2012–1?)
- Mokhtar Arfaoui (March 8, 2013 – June 30, 2013)
- Maher Sdiri (July 14, 2013 – Nov 3, 2013)
- H. Habachi (interim) (Nov 5, 2013 – Nov 12, 2013)
- Mohamed Kouki (Nov 13, 2013 – June 30, 2014)

== Presidents ==
- Mahmoud M'nakbi (1929–45)
- Mohamed Kaoual (1945–53)
- Othman Chaouachi (1953–56)
- Slaheddine Ben Mbarek (1984–85)
- Abdesatar Ben Chiboub (1985–87)
- Taieb Gharbi (1987–89)
- Hassen Zouaghi (1989–92)
- Taieb Gharbi (1992–94)
- Faouzi Ben M'barek (1994–96)
- Hassen Zouaghi (1996–98)
- Abdesatar Ben Chiboub (1998–00)
- Taieb Gharbi (2000–01)
- Mohamed Brahmi (2001–04)
- Mounir Ben Sakhria (2004–05)
- Abdeltif Elkefi (2005–06)
- Ridha Ouni (2006–08)
- Lotfi Kefi (2008–09)
- Mokhtar Nefzi (2009–11)
- Ali Parnasse (2011–13)
