= Mokhtar Tlili =

Tunisian football manager (born 1942)

- Mokhtar Tlili in 1980.

Personal information
- Date of birth: 8 October 1942 (age 84)
- Place of birth: Tunis, Tunisia

Senior career*
Years	Team	Apps	(Gls)
?–1967	CS Cheminots		

Managerial career
- 1967–1968: SC Moknine
- 1968–1969: Olympique du Kef
- 1969–1970: AS Mégrine
- 1971–1972: Olympique du Kef
- 1974–1976: Sfax Railways Sports
- 1976–1978: CS Hammam-Lif
- 1978–1981: ES Tunis
- 1982–1984: Club Africain
- 1985: CA Bizertin
- 1985–1986: Sfax Railways Sports
- 1987–1988: CS Sfaxien
- 1988–1989: Tunisia
- 1992: ES Zarzis
- 1993: Sfax Railways Sports
- 1994: ES Zarzis
- 1995: Olympique Béja
- 1996: ES Zarzis
- 1998: ES Zarzis
- 1999: Sfax Railways Sports
- 2000: US Monastir
- 2001: AS Djerba
- 2007–2008: CA Bizertin
- 2008: ES Zarzis
- 2009: Najran
- 2010-2011: Palestine U23
- 2012-2013: AS Gabès
- 2016–2018: Tunisia (Minifootball)
- * Club domestic league appearances and goals

Mokhtar Tlili (Arabic: مُخْتَار التَّلِيلِيّ; born 8 October 1942) is a Tunisian football manager. He coached the Tunisia national football team.

He was a defender at CS Cheminots, he interrupts his playing career at the age of 25 years to become a coach. He quickly builds a reputation, which allows him to lead the majority of the major Tunisian clubs, obtaining a rich track record and a career in the Gulf countries and Libya. In October 2015, he was appointed as the Goodwill Ambassador of the International Mini-Football Federation.

In October 2017, he guided the Tunisian team in 2017 WMF World Cup and reached the quarter-finals.
