= Club Olympique des Transports =

Tunisian football club

Olympique des Transports
- Full name: Club Olympique des Transports
- Nickname: En'nakel / Inter El Tunsi
- Short name: COT
- Founded: 1945
- Ground: Ali Belhouane Stadium; Mellassine, Tunis, Tunisia
- Capacity: 7,000
- Chairman: (Tunisia) Jamel Zairi
- Manager: (Tunisia) Nabil Ferchichi
- League: Ligue 3
Home colours	Away colours

The Club Olympique des Transports (Arabic: النادي الأولمبي للنقل), often referred to as COT or Ennakel is a Tunisian football club based in the city of Tunis. The club was founded in 1945, the team plays in blue and black colors. Their ground is currently the Ali Belhouane Stadium, which has a capacity of 7,000.

The club gold era was the 70s when coach Hmid Dhib had built a tea. In all COT spends 27 seasons in the first division (professional level). But, like all districts clubs, the club installed in Mellassine, a popular district of Tunis, was unable to resist the deman and has plummeted in three years to end up in the fourth division in 2007–2008 before rising again to CLP-3, and reaching the quarter-finals of the President Cup this year.

== History ==
It was in July 1945 that the ancestor of the COT, En-Najah Sports was created through a group. The club merged with El Hilal Sports du Den-Den (EHSDD) to form the "Club Olympique Tunisien" (Tunisian Olympic Club) in 1960, and then with the "Association sportive des traminots" (Sports Association of traminots) on 29 June 1966, forming Club Olympique des Transports.

== Honors and achievements ==
=== Performance in national and domestic competitions ===
- Tunisian League

Runner-up : 1987–88
Third : 1970–71, 1971–72

- Tunisian President Cup

Winner: 1987–88

- Tunisian Leagues Cup

Best performance: 1999–2000 Lost in 1/2 final against Club sportive Sfaxien 3–0

=== Performance in CAF Competitions ===
- CAF Cup Winners' Cup: 1 appearances

1988–89: first round (1/16 final) against Stade Malien.

3–0 in Bamako
0–0 in Tunis

== Former personal ==
=== Presidents ===
==== En-Najah Sports ====
- Mustapha Achour
- Mongi Allal
- Raouf Ben Ali (1956–1957)
- Mustapha Khaled (1957–1958)

==== Club Olympique des Transports ====
- Mustapha Khaled (1958–1973)
- Sadok Ben Jomaa (1973–1976)
- Abderrahman Ben Massoudi (1976–1977)
- Khelifa Karoui (1977–1980)
- Abbes Ben Hmidan (1980–1982)
- Mustapha Lakhoua (1982–1986)
- Aboulhassan Fekih (1986–1988)
- Mustapha Lakhoua (1988–1989)
- Ferid Mehrezi (1989–1990)
- Bouzaiane Yahiaoui (1990–1991)
- Taoufik Anane (1991–1992)
- Bouzaiane Yahiaoui (1992–1993)
- Aboulhassan Fekih (1993–2002)
- Mohamed Bari alias Kassidy (2002)
- Aboulhassan Fekih (2002–2004)
- Naceur Chouayakh (2004–2005)
- Lotfi Cherif (2005–2006)
- Hedi Ben Ali (2006–2008)
- Mohamed Trabelsi (2008–present)

=== Coaches ===
- Mahmoud Kouki (1955–1956)
- Hmid Dhib (1956–1960)
- Hédi Feddou (1960)
- Hmid Dhib (1963–1965)
- Salah Beji (1965)
- Rachid Turki (1966–1967)
- Ahmed Belfoul (1967–1968)
- Hmid Dhib (1968–1973)
- Mustapha Jouili (1973–1974)
- Ammar Nahali (1974–1975)
- Amor Dhib (1975–1976)
- Jamaleddine Bouabsa (1976)
- Béchir Ben Mime (1976–1978)
- Ali Chabbouh (1979–1981)
- Bernard Blaut (1981–1982)
- Hmid Dhib (1982–1985)
- Ahmed Belfoul (1985–1986)
- Bernard Blaut (1986–1988)
- Raouf Ben Amor then Ridha Akacha (1988–1989)
- Kazbeck then Ali Kaabi (1989–1990)
- Mahmoud Bacha (1990–1992)
- Mohieddine Habita then Faouzi Henchiri (1992–1993)
- Taoufik Ben Othman (1993)
- Ali Kaabi (1994–1995)
- Bialas (1995–1996)
- Ali Kaabi then Kostek then Khaled Hosny (1996–1997)
- Ridha Akacha then Khaled Hosny then Bialas (1997–1998)
- Bernard Blaut (1998–1999)
- Slobodan Milo then Bialas then Bernard Blaut (1999–2000)
- Amor Dhib (2000–2001)
- Bernard Blaut then Tarek Ben Ali then Ridha Akacha (2001–2002)
- Ali Kaabi (2002–2003)
- Edmund Stöhr then Lassaad Chabbi then Bernard Blaut (2003–2004)
- Ali Kaabi then Belhassen Meriah then Accorsey (2004–2005)
- Abid Mchala then Lotfi Hannachi then Lotfi Kaabi (2005–2006)
- Lotfi Kaabi then Mabrouk Fehmi then Ridha Boushih (2006–2007)
- Lotfi Chihi (2007–2008)
