= 1999–2000 Tunisian Coupe de la Ligue Professionnelle =

1999–2000 Coupe de la Ligue Professionnelle
Tournament details
- Country: Tunisia

Final positions
- Champions: Stade Tunisien
- Runner-up: CS Sfaxien

The 1999–2000 Tunisian Coupe de la Ligue Professionnelle was the 1st edition of the top knockout tournament for the Tunisian league football clubs.

== Group stage ==
=== Group A ===
Pos	Team	Pld	W	D	L	GF	GA	GD	Pts	Qualification
1	Stade Tunisien	8	5	2	1	10	3	+7	17	Advance to Round of 16
2	EGS Gafsa	8	4	1	3	9	8	+1	13	Advance to Round of 16
3	ES Zarzis	8	2	5	1	7	5	+2	11	Advance to Round of 16
4	Jendouba Sport	8	3	1	4	5	10	−5	10	
5	US Monastir	8	0	3	5	4	9	−5	3	

Source: RSSSF

=== Group B ===
Pos	Team	Pld	W	D	L	GF	GA	GD	Pts	Qualification
1	CS Sfaxien	8	4	2	2	12	5	+7	14	Advance to Round of 16
2	Stade Africain Menzel Bourguiba	8	4	1	3	11	11	0	13	Advance to Round of 16
3	JS Kairouan	8	3	2	3	8	8	0	11	Advance to Round of 16
4	CO Medenine	8	3	2	3	7	10	−3	11	
5	ES Beni Khalled	8	1	3	4	5	9	−4	6	

Source: RSSSF

=== Group C ===
Pos	Team	Pld	W	D	L	GF	GA	GD	Pts	Qualification
1	ES Jerba	8	5	2	1	16	8	+8	17	Advance to Round of 16
2	CO Transports	8	4	2	2	9	8	+1	14	Advance to Round of 16
3	AS Marsa	8	3	3	2	11	6	+5	12	Advance to Round of 16
4	AS Gabes	7	1	3	3	8	13	−5	6	
5	Olympique du Kef	7	1	0	6	5	14	−9	3	

Source: RSSSF

=== Group D ===
Pos	Team	Pld	W	D	L	GF	GA	GD	Pts	Qualification
1	CA Bizertin	10	8	2	0	24	8	+16	26	Advance to Round of 16
2	Olympique Béja	10	4	4	2	15	12	+3	16	Advance to Round of 16
3	AS Djerba	10	4	3	3	12	8	+4	15	Advance to Round of 16
4	CS Hammam-Lif	10	3	3	4	9	10	−1	12	Advance to Round of 16
5	Grombalia Sport	10	1	5	4	9	19	−10	8	
6	Kalâa Sport	10	0	3	7	3	15	−12	3	

Source: RSSSF

== Round of 16 ==
Espérance Sportive de Tunis, Étoile Sportive du Sahel and Club Africain received a bye to Round of 16. Both Espérance Sportive de Tunis and Étoile Sportive du Sahel withdrew from the competition and were replaced by Jendouba Sport and CO Medenine.

25 February 2000	Jendouba Sport	0–0 (a.e.t.) (2–4 p)	CO Transports

25 February 2000	ES Zarzis	0–1	CS Sfaxien

25 February 2000	ES Jerba	0–1	CO Medenine

26 February 2000	AS Marsa	1–1 (a.e.t.) (2–3 p)	JS Kairouan

26 February 2000	Stade Africain Menzel Bourguiba	1–0	EGS Gafsa

26 February 2000	Stade Tunisien	1–1 (a.e.t.) (4–3 p)	AS Djerba

26 February 2000	CS Hammam-Lif	1–1 (a.e.t.) (2–4 p)	Olympique Beja

26 February 2000	Club Africain	2–1 (a.e.t.)	CA Bizertin

== Quarter-finals ==
26 March 2000	CO Medenine	1–2	Stade Tunisien

26 March 2000	Olympique Beja	0–1	Club Africain

22 March 2000	JS Kairouan	1–2	CS Sfaxien

26 March 2000	Stade Africain Menzel Bourguiba	0–4	CO Transports

== Semi-finals ==
6 June 2000	Stade Tunisien	3–1	Club Africain

6 June 2000	CS Sfaxien	3–0	CO Transports

== Final ==
10 June 2000	Stade Tunisien	1–0	CS Sfaxien
	Mokrani 88'

== See also ==
- 1999–2000 Tunisian Ligue Professionnelle 1
- 1999–2000 Tunisian Ligue Professionnelle 2
- 1999–2000 Tunisian Cup
