= 1982–83 Espérance Sportive de Tunis season =

Espérance Sportive de Tunis
1982–83 season
- Chairman: Naceur Knani
- Head coach: Mrad Mahjoub
- Stadium: Stade El Menzah
- National 1: 3rd
- Tunisian Cup: Quarter-final
- Top goalscorer: League: Tarak Dhiab (15 goals); All: Tarak Dhiab (17 goals)

In the 1982–83 season, Espérance Sportive de Tunis competed in the National 1 for the 28th season, as well as the Tunisian Cup. It was their 28th consecutive season in the top flight of Tunisian football. They competed in National 1, and the Tunisian Cup.

== Squad list ==
Players and squad numbers last updated on 18 November 1982.
Note: Flags indicate national team as has been defined under FIFA eligibility rules. Players may hold more than one non-FIFA nationality.

No.	Nat.	Position	Name	Date of birth (age)	Signed from
Goalkeepers
	(Tunisia)	GK	Kamel Karia	12 December 1950 (aged 31)	(Tunisia)
	(Tunisia)	GK	Mohsen Rajhi "Zarga"	17 March 1958 (aged 24)	(Tunisia)
Defenders
	(Tunisia)		Ali Ben Neji	26 September 1961 (aged 21)	(Tunisia)
	(Tunisia)		Montassar Ben Ousman		(Tunisia)
	(Tunisia)		Lassaâd Dhiab		(Tunisia)
	(Tunisia)		Lofti Jebara		(Tunisia)
	(Tunisia)		Abdelhamid Kanzari		(Tunisia)
	(Tunisia)		Samir Khémiri		(Tunisia)
	(Tunisia)		Houcine Soula		(Tunisia)
	(Tunisia)		Fethi Trabelsi		(Tunisia)
Midfielders
	(Tunisia)		Mondher Baouab	13 May 1961 (aged 21)	(Tunisia)
	(Tunisia)		Mohamed Ben Mahmoud		(Tunisia)
	(Tunisia)		Lofti Laâroussi	8 October 1955 (aged 26)	(Tunisia)
	(Tunisia)		Adel Latrach		(Tunisia)
	(Tunisia)		Nabil Maâloul	25 July 1962 (aged 20)	(Tunisia) Youth system
	(Tunisia)		Fethi Ouasti		(Tunisia)
Forwards
	(Tunisia)		Tarak Dhiab	15 January 1954 (aged 28)	(Saudi Arabia) Al-Ahli
	(Tunisia)		Riadh Fahem	13 October 1959 (aged 22)	(Tunisia)
	(Tunisia)		Hassen Feddou		(Tunisia)
	(Tunisia)		Nabil Ghraïri		(Tunisia)
	(Tunisia)		Abdelmajid Gobantini		(Tunisia)
	(Tunisia)		Bassem Jeridi		(Tunisia)

== Competitions ==
=== Overview ===
Competition	Record								Started round	Final position / round	First match	Last match
Competition	G	W	D	L	GF	GA	GD	Win %	Started round	Final position / round	First match	Last match
National 1	26	12	10	4	40	16	+24	46.15	—N/a	3rd	26 September 1982	29 May 1983
Tunisian Cup	3	2	0	1	5	4	+1	66.67	Round of 32	Quarter-final	9 January 1983	20 March 1983
Total	29	14	10	5	45	20	+25	48.28				

Updated to match played 3 June 2019
Source: Competitions

=== National 1 ===
==== League table ====
Pos	Team	Pld	W	D	L	GF	GA	GD	Pts	Qualification or relegation
1	CS Sfaxien	26	15	8	3	33	10	+23	64	Qualification for Cup of Champions Clubs
2	Club Africain	26	13	11	2	52	16	+36	63	
3	Espérance de Tunis	26	12	10	4	40	16	+24	60	
4	Stade Tunisien	26	10	10	6	21	14	+7	56	
5	CA Bizertin	26	10	8	8	27	24	+3	54	

Source: National Championship
Rules for classification: 1) points; 2) head-to-head points; 3) head-to-head goal difference; 4) goal difference; 5) total goals; 6) fairplay ranking; 7) playoff.

==== Results by round ====
Round	1	2	3	4	5	6	7	8	9	10	11	12	13	14	15	16	17	18	19	20	21	22	23	24	25	26
Ground	A	H	A	A	H	A	H	A	H	A	H	A	H	H	A	H	H	A	H	A	H	A	H	A	H	A
Result	D	W	W	W	D	D	W	D	W	L	D	W	W	W	L	W	W	D	W	L	D	D	D	D	W	L
Position	7	5	4	2	2	2	1	1	1	2	3	3	3	3	4	2	2	2	2	3	3	3	3	3	3	3

Updated to match(es) played on 22 April 2019. Source: Competitive matches
A = Away; H = Home; W = Win; D = Draw; L = Loss

=== Matches ===
Win Draw Loss

26 September 1982 Round 1	JS Kairouan	0–0	Espérance de Tunis
				Referee: Hafedh Haj Hamida

3 October 1982 Round 2	Espérance de Tunis	1–0	CA Bizertin	Tunis
	Riadh Fahem 26'			Stadium: Stade El Menzah; Referee: Mimoub

10 October 1982 Round 3	OC Kerkennah	0–1	Espérance de Tunis
			Laroussi 15'	Referee: Selmi

15 October 1982 Round 4	CS Hammam-Lif	1–2	Espérance de Tunis
	Shili 75'		Ouasti 28'; Riadh Fahem 30'	Referee: Ben Khédija

17 October 1982 Round 5	Espérance de Tunis	0–0	Stade Gabèsien	Tunis
				Stadium: Stade El Menzah

24 October 1982 Round 6	Sfax RS	1–1	Espérance de Tunis	Sfax
	Chaabane 90'		Maaloul 28'	Stadium: Stade Taïeb Mhiri; Referee: Bellagha

7 November 1982 Round 7	Espérance de Tunis	1–0	Étoile du Sahel	Tunis
	Lassaad 68'			Stadium: Stade El Menzah; Referee: Akrout

12 November 1982 Round 8	Stade Tunisien	0–0	Espérance de Tunis
				Referee: Bellagha

14 November 1982 Round 9	Espérance de Tunis	2–1	AS Marsa	Tunis
	Tarak Dhiab 21'; Khémiri 38'		Limam 55'	Stadium: Stade El Menzah; Attendance: 3,956; Referee: Kraïem

21 November 1982 Round 10	CS Sfaxien	1–0	Espérance de Tunis	Sfax
	Agrebi 76'			Stadium: Stade Taïeb Mhiri; Referee: Chargui

28 November 1982 Round 11	Espérance de Tunis	0–0	Club Africain	Tunis
				Stadium: Stade El Menzah; Referee: Ben Khédija

5 December 1982 Round 12	CS Korba	4–7	Espérance de Tunis
	Msaddek 22', 66', 79'; Ben Saïd 49'		Tarak Dhiab 7' (pen.), 69', 73', 81'; Laroussi 12'; Gobantini 18', 30'	Referee: Kraïem

12 December 1982 Round 13	Espérance de Tunis	1–0	US Monastir	Tunis
	Gobantini 27'			Stadium: Stade El Menzah; Referee: Kraïem

2 January 1983 Round 14	Espérance de Tunis	5–0	JS Kairouan	Tunis
	Tarak Dhiab 24' (pen.), 44', 89'; Riadh Fahem 33'; Maaloul 61'			Stadium: Stade El Menzah; Referee: Bellagha

9 January 1983 Round 15	CA Bizertin	2–1	Espérance de Tunis
	Ben Doulet 25'; Turki 67'		Riadh Fahem 49'

18 January 1983 Round 16	Espérance de Tunis	4–0	OC Kerkennah	Tunis
	Ben Néji 21'; Gobantini 41'; Latrach 51'; Tarak Dhiab 61'			Stadium: Stade El Menzah; Attendance: 22,322; Referee: Hafedh Haj Hamida

23 January 1983 Round 17	Espérance de Tunis	1–0	CS Hammam-Lif	Tunis
	Gobantini 25'			Stadium: Stade El Menzah; Referee: Mellouli

13 February 1983 Round 18	Stade Gabèsien	0–0	Espérance de Tunis
				Referee: Akrout

20 February 1983 Round 19	Espérance de Tunis	1–0	Sfax RS	Tunis
	Maaloul 40'			Stadium: Stade El Menzah; Attendance: 5,906; Referee: Oueslati

6 March 1983 Round 20	Étoile du Sahel	2–1	Espérance de Tunis	Sousse
	Hsoumi 75' (pen.); Ben Fattoum 88'		Dhiab 89' (pen.)	Stadium: Stade Olympique de Sousse; Referee: Mellouli

13 March 1983 Round 21	Espérance de Tunis	0–0	Stade Tunisien	Tunis
				Stadium: Stade El Menzah; Referee: Oueslati

27 March 1983 Round 22	AS Marsa	1–1	Espérance de Tunis
	Jebali 3'		Jeridi 84'	Referee: Hafedh Haj Hamida

1 April 1983 Round 23	Espérance de Tunis	0–0	CS Sfaxien	Tunis
				Stadium: Stade El Menzah; Referee: Bellagha

8 May 1983 Round 24	Club Africain	1–1	Espérance de Tunis	Tunis
	Abdelli 48'		Jebara 62'	Stadium: Stade El Menzah; Referee: Mimouni

15 May 1983 Round 25	Espérance de Tunis	8–0	CS Korba	Tunis
	Gobantini 5', 59'; Tarak Dhiab 27', 35', 46', 76' (pen.), 81'; Jebara 51'			Stadium: Stade El Menzah; Referee: Oueslati

29 May 1983 Round 26	US Monastir	2–1	Espérance de Tunis	Monastir
	R Jaziri 63', 68'		Nabli 77' (o.g.)	Stadium: Stade Mustapha Ben Jannet; Referee: Neji Jouini

== Tunisian Cup ==
9 January 1983 Round of 32	CS Korba	1–3	Espérance de Tunis
	Sassi 67'		Mtaallah 23' (o.g.); Latrach 50'; Tarak Dhiab 52'	Referee: Ben Khédija

27 February 1983 Round of 16	Espérance de Tunis	1–0	US Monastir	Tunis
	Tarak Dhiab 89'			Stadium: Stade El Menzah

20 March 1983 Quarter-final	Club Africain	3–1 (a.e.t.)	Espérance de Tunis	Tunis
	Abdelli 90'; Sghaïer 100'; Bayari 117'		Sghaïer 49' (o.g.)	Stadium: Stade El Menzah

== Squad information ==
=== Playing statistics ===
No.	Pos	Nat	Player	Total		National 1		Tunisian Cup	
No.	Pos	Nat	Player	Apps	Goals	Apps	Goals	Apps	Goals
Goalkeepers
	GK	(Tunisia) TUN	Kamel Karia	28	0	25	0	3	0
	GK	(Tunisia) TUN	Mohsen Rajhi "Zarga"	1	0	1	0	0	0
Defenders
	DF	(Tunisia) TUN	Ali Ben Neji	24	1	21	1	3	0
	DF	(Tunisia) TUN	Montassar Ben Ousman	7	0	7	0	0	0
	DF	(Tunisia) TUN	Lassaâd Dhiab	19	1	16	1	3	0
	DF	(Tunisia) TUN	Lofti Jebara	6	2	6	2	0	0
	DF	(Tunisia) TUN	Abdelhamid Kanzari	21	0	19	0	2	0
	DF	(Tunisia) TUN	Samir Khémiri	25	1	23	1	2	0
	DF	(Tunisia) TUN	Houcine Soula	1	0	1	0	0	0
	DF	(Tunisia) TUN	Fethi Trabelsi	23	0	20	0	3	0
Midfielders
	MF	(Tunisia) TUN	Mondher Baouab	3	0	3	0	0	0
	MF	(Tunisia) TUN	Mohamed Ben Mahmoud	16	0	15	0	1	0
	MF	(Tunisia) TUN	Lofti Laâroussi	21	2	18	2	3	0
	MF	(Tunisia) TUN	Adel Latrach	18	2	16	1	2	1
	MF	(Tunisia) TUN	Nabil Maâloul	24	3	22	3	2	0
	MF	(Tunisia) TUN	Fethi Ouasti	24	1	22	1	2	0
Forwards
	FW	(Tunisia) TUN	Tarak Dhiab	25	17	22	15	3	2
	FW	(Tunisia) TUN	Riadh Fahem	24	4	21	4	3	0
	FW	(Tunisia) TUN	Hassen Feddou	16	0	14	0	2	0
	FW	(Tunisia) TUN	Nabil Ghraïri	9	0	9	0	0	0
	FW	(Tunisia) TUN	Abdelmajid Gobantini	23	7	20	7	3	0
	FW	(Tunisia) TUN	Bassem Jeridi	8	1	7	1	1	0
Players transferred out during the season

Source: Competitions

=== Goalscorers ===
Includes all competitive matches. The list is sorted alphabetically by surname when total goals are equal.

No.	Nat.	Player	Pos.	N 1	TC	TOTAL
	(Tunisia)	Tarak Dhiab	FW	15	2	17
	(Tunisia)	Abdelmajid Gobantini	FW	7	0	7
	(Tunisia)	Riadh Fahem	FW	4	0	4
	(Tunisia)	Nabil Maâloul	MF	3	0	3
	(Tunisia)	Lofti Laâroussi	MF	2	0	2
	(Tunisia)	Lofti Jebara	DF	2	0	2
	(Tunisia)	Adel Latrach	MF	1	1	2
	(Tunisia)	Ali Ben Neji	DF	1	0	1
	(Tunisia)	Lassaâd Dhiab	DF	1	0	1
	(Tunisia)	Samir Khémiri	DF	1	0	1
	(Tunisia)	Fethi Ouasti	MF	1	0	1
	(Tunisia)	Bassem Jeridi	FW	1	0	1
Own Goals				1	2	3
Totals				40	5	45
