= 1982–83 Tunisian National Championship =

Tunisian Ligue Professionnelle 1
- Season: 1982–83
- Dates: 26 September 1982 – 29 May 1983
- Champions: CS Sfaxien
- Relegated: OC Kerkennah; CS Korba
- Cup of Champions Clubs: CS Sfaxien
- Cup Winners' Cup: Étoile Sportive du Sahel
- Matches played: 240
- Top goalscorer: Hédi Bayari (17 goals)
- Biggest home win: Espérance de Tunis 8–0 CS Korba (15 May 1983)
- Biggest away win: AS Marsa 0–4 Club Africain (23 January 1983)
- Highest scoring: CS Korba 4–7 Espérance de Tunis (5 December 1982)

The 1982–83 Tunisian Ligue Professionnelle 1 (Tunisian National Championship) season was the 28th season of top-tier football in Tunisia. The competition began on 26 September 1982, and ended on 29 May 1983. The defending champions from the previous season are Espérance de Tunis.

== Teams and venues ==
Location of teams in 1982–83 Tunisian National Championship

Clubs	Last promotion	Position in 1982–83	Venue	Location
Espérance ST	1936	1	Stade El Menzah	Tunis
Club Africain	1937	2	Stade El Menzah	Tunis
Etoile Sahel	1931	3	Sousse's Olympic stadium	Sousse
Stade tunisien	1955	4	Stade Chedli Zouiten	Le Bardo
CS Sfaxien	1939	5	Stade Taïeb Mhiri	Sfax
JS Kairouan	?	6	?	Kairouan
AS Marsa	?	7	?	La Marsa
Club Athletique Bizertin	?	8	?	Bizerte
CS Hammam-Lif	?	9	?	Hammam Lif
Sfax RS	?	10	?	Sfax
US Monastir	?	11	Stade Mustapha Ben Jannet	Monastir
OC Kerkennah	?	12	?	Kerkennah Islands
Stade Gabèsien	?	2 (CPL-2)	?	Gabès
CS Korba	?	2 (CPL-2)	?	Korba

== Results ==
=== League table ===
Pos	Team	Pld	W	D	L	GF	GA	GD	Pts	Qualification or relegation
1	CS Sfaxien	26	15	8	3	33	10	+23	64	Qualification for Cup of Champions Clubs
2	Club Africain	26	13	11	2	52	16	+36	63	
3	Espérance de Tunis	26	12	10	4	40	16	+24	60	
4	Stade Tunisien	26	10	10	6	21	14	+7	56	
5	CA Bizertin	26	10	8	8	27	24	+3	54	
6	Etoile du Sahel	26	10	7	9	24	24	0	53	Qualification for Cup Winners' Cup
7	CS Hammam-Lif	26	8	9	9	32	28	+4	51	
8	JS Kairouan	26	7	11	8	23	25	−2	51	
9	Sfax RS	26	4	16	6	23	24	−1	50	
10	US Monastir	26	8	8	10	20	23	−3	50	
11	AS Marsa	26	7	8	11	20	30	−10	48	
12	Stade Gabèsien	26	7	6	13	18	44	−26	46	
13	OC Kerkennah	26	3	12	11	11	33	−22	44	Relegation to Ligue 2
14	CS Korba	26	3	6	17	14	47	−33	38	Relegation to Ligue 2

Source: National Championship
Rules for classification: 1) points; 2) head-to-head points; 3) head-to-head goal difference; 4) goal difference; 5) total goals; 6) fairplay ranking; 7) playoff.

== Top goalscorers ==
Rank	Player	Club	Goals
1	(Tunisia) Hedi Bayari	Club Africain	17
2	(Tunisia) Tarak Dhiab	Espérance de Tunis	15
3	(Tunisia) Khaled Touati	Club Africain	9
3	(Tunisia) Khemais Ben Fattoum	Etoile du Sahel	9
5	(Tunisia) Hamadi Agrebi	CS Sfaxien	8
6	(Tunisia) Abdelmajid Gobantini	Espérance de Tunis	7
6	(Tunisia) Abbès Abbès	CS Sfaxien	7
8	(Tunisia) Lotfi Hsoumi	Etoile du Sahel	6
8	(Tunisia) Mohamed Hedi Gomri	JS Kairouan	6
8	(Tunisia) Habib Majri	CS Hammam-Lif	6
8	(Tunisia) Habib Gasmi	Club Africain	6
