= CO Médenine =

Tunisian association football club

Olympique Médenine
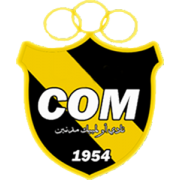
- Full name: Club Olympique de Médenine
- Founded: 5 February 1954
- Ground: Salaheddine Ben Hmida Stadium; Médenine, Tunisia
- Capacity: 6,000
- Chairman: Mohamed Saïdi
- League: Tunisian Ligue Professionnelle 2
- 2017–18: 14th (Relegated)
Home colours	Away colours	Third colours

Club Olympique de Médenine is a Tunisian football club based in Médenine and founded in 1954, currently competing in the Tunisian Ligue Professionnelle 2.

== History ==
Founded on February 5, 1954, under the name of Olympique de Médenine by a Frenchman named Godal, he played for a long time in regional division before securing his first accession to the second division in 1972, under the direction of Ahmed Msallem even if it retrogrades quickly.

In 1995, the team that was ranked ninth in the third division south, is taken in hand by Bashir Ben Amor. In two years, he allows the club now called the Olympic Club of Medenine to access in Ligue I. His successor in 2000, Mongi Ksiksi, provided some continuity for the club but the financial means were no longer up to the ambitions and the club found itself again in Ligue III. However, the club regained its ambitions and, in two years, got two accessions that bring him temporarily in Ligue I in 2017, after a play-off against the AS La Marsa.

== Achievements & honors ==
- Tunisian Ligue Professionnelle 2: 1997, 2001

== Managers ==
- 1971–1973 : Ahmed Msallem
- 1973–1975 : Moncef Sallem
- 1977–1978 : Ahmed Ouannes
- 1978–1979 : Salem Kraïem
- 1979–1980 : Abdelkrim Belghaieb / Ahmed Msallem
- 1980–1981 : Ahmed Msallem
- 1981–1982 : Mohamed Ouni
- 1982–1983 : Salem Kraïem
- 1983–1984 : Mohamed Ouni / Ouahid Menif
- 1984–1985 : Ahmed Lakhdar / Habib Trabelsi
- 1985–1986 : Ahmed Ouannes
- 1986–1987 : Habib Trabelsi
- 1987–1989 : Ivan Gotov
- 1989–1990 : Abdelmajid Ben Hmida / Hmida Sallem
- 1990–1991 : Mohamed Lassoued
- 1991–1992 : Abdelmajid Ben Hmida / Ouahid Menif
- 1992–1993 : Fakher Trigui
- 1993–1994 : Fakher Trigui / Mohamed Jeriri / Habib Trabelsi
- 1994–1995 : Nizar Jebal / Michel Choukodrov / Kamel Boughezala
- 1995–1996 : Ferid Laaroussi
- 1996–1998 : Mircea Dridea / Hassen Malouche / Stephan Dietscha
- 1998–1999 : Robert Buigues / Hédi Kouni / Moncef Melliti / Fakher Trigui / Habib Othmani
- 1999–2000 : Serge Devèze / Patrice Neveu
- 2000–2001 : Kamel Boughezala
- 2001–2002 : Patrice Neveu / Kamel Chebli
- 2002–2003 : Abderrahmane Rahmouni / Bogdanovic / Ridha Akacha
- 2003–2004 : Idrissa Traoré / Larbi Kaddour / Khaled Ben Sassi
- 2004–2006 : Hosni Najjari / Kamel Boughezala
- 2006–2007 : Chafik Dridi / Hosni Najjari / Tahar Lamine / Mounir Rached
- 2007–2008 : Radhouan Lamine / Mounir Rached / Moncef Belhassen
- 2008–2009 : Moncef Belhassen, Ahmed Labiedh
- 2009–2010 : Walid Atoui / Salah Dey
- 2010–2011 : Salah Dey
- 2011–2013 : Lotfi Sebti / Tahar Lamine
- 2013–2014 : Salah Dey, Nader Werda, Rejeb Sayeh / Tarek Belghith
- 2014–2015 : Ounais Bouzidi
- 2015–2016 : Karim Gabsi, Ridha Zammouri, Dhaou Guetat /Othman Chehaibi
- 2016–2017 : Othman Chehaibi, Dhaou Guetat / Afouène Gharbi
- 2017–2018 : Afouène Gharbi
- 2018–2019 : Hatem Mednini /Abdelkarim Nafti

== Presidents ==
- M. Godal
- Amara Jarmoud
- Messaoud Ben Hmida
- Béchir Belhouchet
- Ahmed Cherif
- Letayef Koskossi
- Hédi Ben Romdhane
- Abbes Ben Hmidène
- Noureddine Hlioui
- Boubaker Telmoudi
- Taoufik Mzah
- Ahmed Ben Hmida
- Slaheddine Ben Hmida
- Mohamed Ouni
- Ali Maaref
- Moncef Kaddour
- Tahar Naïri
- Ali Ksiksi
- Khaled Bouchenak
- Mohamed Chakri
- Béchir Ben Amor
- Mongi Ksiksi
- Dakhli Belghith
- Hédi Gasmi
- Boulbaba Naïri
- Jalel Ben Hamida
- Fethi Ksiksi (2009–2011)
- Amor Cheniter (2011–2013)
- Samir Hamroun (2013–2015)
- Afif Ben Yamna (2015)
- Mohamed Saïdi (2015– )
