= List of Tunisia national football team managers =

The position of Tunisia national football team manager was created in 1956, 42 men have held the position since its creation and the first was Rachid Turki. Yugoslav Milan Kristić was the first foreign coach to supervise Tunisia, between 1960 and 1961, when he led the team to qualify for its first international tournament, the 1960 Summer Olympics. Seven coaches have held the position on an interim basis: Faouzi Benzarti (one match during the 1994 African Cup of Nations), Sami Trabelsi (six matches in 2011, until his appointment on a full-time basis), Ruud Krol (two matches in 2013), Nizar Khanfir (one match in 2014), Maher Kanzari (two matches in 2018), Montasser Louhichi (four matches in 2024) and Kais Yaâkoubi (two matches in 2024).

French coach Roger Lemerre remains the longest-serving coach in Tunisia's history, having overseen the team from 25 September 2002 to 30 June 2008, over a period of 72 matches. He is also the most successful coach, having led the team to won its first Africa Cup of Nations title in 2004. He also led the team during the 2005 Confederations Cup and the 2006 FIFA World Cup. During his coaching career, Faouzi Benzarti has coached the Tunisian national team four times in 12 matches. The first was as an interim coach during the second match of the 1994 African Cup of Nations against Zaire, the second during the 2010 Africa Cup of Nations, the third during the 2019 Africa Cup of Nations qualification, and the last during the 2025 Africa Cup of Nations qualification.

The Tunisia manager's role means he has sole responsibility for all on-the-field elements of the Tunisian team. Among other activities, this includes selecting the national team squad, the starting team, captain, tactics, substitutes and penalty-takers. The coach has a relative freedom to choose his staff as some of coaches refused to coach the Tunisian national team due to the Tunisian Football Federation’s refusal to appoint foreign assistant coaches. This was the case with Jacques Santini in 2008 and Raymond Domenech. However, the Tunisian Football Federation agreed to Henryk Kasperczak's proposal in 2015 to appoint Frenchman Patrick Hesse to the team.

The team has been plagued by an ongoing coaching crisis, having appointed seven different managers between January 2024 and July 2026—the latter being the date when the current coach, Mouin Chaâbani, was appointed.

== List ==
As of 17 November 2026

Managers in italics were hired as caretakers.

Manager	From	To	Pld	W	D	L	Win %	Tournaments
(Tunisia) Rachid Turki	1956	1957	0	0	0	0	0.00%	—N/a
(Algeria) Habib Draoua (DTN) (Tunisia) Hechmi Cherif (Tunisia) Larbi Soudani	1957	1960	15	7	2	6	46.67%	—N/a
(Socialist Federal Republic of Yugoslavia) Milan Kristić	1960	1961	23	5	4	14	21.74%	1960 Summer Olympic Games – Group stage 1962 FIFA World Cup – Failed to qualify
(Socialist Federal Republic of Yugoslavia) Frane Matošić	1961	1962	6	1	2	3	16.67%	1962 African Cup of Nations – Third place
(France) André Gérard	1963	1965	34	15	9	10	44.12%	1963 Arab Cup – Champions; 1963 African Cup of Nations – Group stage
(Tunisia) Mokhtar Ben Nacef	1965	1968	15	5	8	2	33.33%	1965 African Cup of Nations – Runners-up; 1968 African Cup of Nations – Failed to qualify
(Socialist Federal Republic of Yugoslavia) Radojica Radojičić	17 November 1968	17 April 1969	9	2	3	4	22.22%	—N/a
(Socialist Federal Republic of Yugoslavia) Sereta Begović	27 April 1969	13 June 1969	5	0	4	1	0.00%	1970 FIFA World Cup – Failed to qualify
(Tunisia) Ameur Hizem (1)	11 November 1970	16 July 1974	33	16	6	11	48.48%	1974 FIFA World Cup – Failed to qualify
(Hungary) Andrej Prean Nagy	September 1974	February 1975	10	4	1	5	40.00%	—N/a
(Tunisia) Abdelmajid Chetali	12 February 1975	20 December 1978	52	18	18	16	34.61%	1976 African Cup of Nations – Failed to qualify 1978 African Cup of Nations – Fourth Place; 1978 FIFA World Cup – Group stage
(Tunisia) Ameur Hizem (2)	December 1978	April 1979	3	1	1	1	33.33%	—N/a
(Tunisia) Ahmed Dhib	July 1979	August 1980	14	3	3	5	21.43%	1982 FIFA World Cup – Failed to qualify
(Poland) Ryszard Kulesza	August 1981	December 1983	25	10	5	10	40.00%	1982 African Cup of Nations – Group stage 1984 African Cup of Nations – Failed to qualify
(Tunisia) Youssef Zouaoui (1)	September 1984	February 1986	26	13	3	8	54.16%	1986 African Cup of Nations – Failed to qualify 1986 FIFA World Cup – Failed to qualify
(France) Jean Vincent	October 1986	April 1987	10	1	2	7	10.00%	1988 African Cup of Nations – Failed to qualify
(Tunisia) Taoufik Ben Othman	September 1987	July 1988	16	4	3	9	25.00%	—N/a
(Poland) Antoni Piechniczek (1)	August 1988	September 1988	9	3	3	3	33.33%	1988 Summer Olympic Games – Group stage
(Tunisia) Mokhtar Tlili	November 1988	July 1989	14	3	4	7	21.43%	1990 African Cup of Nations – Failed to qualify
(Poland) Antoni Piechniczek (2)	July 1989	November 1989	8	2	2	4	25.00%	1990 FIFA World Cup – Failed to qualify
(Tunisia) Mrad Mahjoub	April 1990	February 1993	26	8	13	5	30.77%	1992 African Cup of Nations – Failed to qualify 1994 FIFA World Cup – Failed to qualify
(Tunisia) Youssef Zouaoui (2)	March 1993	March 1994	13	4	6	3	30.77%	—N/a
(Tunisia) Faouzi Benzarti (1)	March 1994	March 1994	1	0	1	0	0.00%	1994 African Cup of Nations – Group stage
(Poland) Henryk Kasperczak (1)	May 1994	June 1998	59	30	11	18	50.84%	1996 African Cup of Nations – Runners-up; 1998 African Cup of Nations – Quarter-finals; 1998 FIFA World Cup – Group stage
(Italy) Franco Scoglio	September 1998	February 2001	32	19	8	5	59.73%	2000 African Cup of Nations – Fourth Place
(Germany) Eckhard Krautzun	March 2001	July 2001	7	4	2	1	57.14%	2002 FIFA World Cup – Group stage
(France) Henri Michel	28 November 2001	13 March 2002	6	2	2	2	33.33%	2002 African Cup of Nations – Group stage
(Tunisia) Ammar Souayah	26 March 2002	24 July 2002	6	0	3	3	0.00%	—N/a
(France) Roger Lemerre	25 September 2002	30 June 2008	67	40	15	12	59.70%	2004 African Cup of Nations – Champions; 2005 FIFA Confederations Cup – Group stage 2006 Africa Cup of Nations – Quarter-finals; 2006 FIFA World Cup – Group stage 2008 Africa Cup of Nations – Quarter-finals
(Portugal) Humberto Coelho	30 June 2008	18 November 2009	15	5	4	3	33.33%	2010 FIFA World Cup – Failed to qualify
(Tunisia) Faouzi Benzarti (2)	23 November 2009	23 January 2010	4	0	3	1	0.00%	2010 Africa Cup of Nations – Group stage
(France) Bertrand Marchand	4 June 2010	15 December 2010	6	3	1	2	50.00%	—N/a
(Tunisia) Sami Trabelsi	11 March 2011	8 February 2013	32	13	9	10	40.63%	2012 Africa Cup of Nations – Quarter-finals; 2013 Africa Cup of Nations – Group stage
(Tunisia) Nabil Maâloul (1)	14 February 2013	8 September 2013	7	2	3	2	28.57%	—N/a
(Netherlands) Ruud Krol	18 September 2013	17 November 2013	2	0	1	1	0.00%	2014 FIFA World Cup – Failed to qualify
(Tunisia) Nizar Khanfir	19 February 2014	26 March 2014	1	0	1	0	0.00%	—N/a
(Belgium) Georges Leekens	27 March 2014	26 June 2015	19	7	8	4	36.84%	2015 Africa Cup of Nations – Quarter-finals
(Poland) Henryk Kasperczak (2)	13 July 2015	7 April 2017	26	12	5	10	46.15%	2017 Africa Cup of Nations – Quarter-finals
(Tunisia) Nabil Maâloul (2)	27 April 2017	12 July 2018	13	6	4	3	46.15%	2018 FIFA World Cup – Group stage
(Tunisia) Faouzi Benzarti (3)	28 July 2018	20 October 2018	3	3	0	0	100.00%	—N/a
(Tunisia) Maher Kanzari	21 October 2018	21 November 2018	2	0	0	2	0.00%	—N/a
(France) Alain Giresse	14 December 2018	21 August 2019	12	5	4	3	41.67%	2019 Africa Cup of Nations – Fourth Place
(Tunisia) Mondher Kebaier	29 August 2019	30 January 2022	31	19	4	8	61.29%	2021 FIFA Arab Cup – Runners-up; 2021 Africa Cup of Nations – Quarter-finals
(Tunisia) Jalel Kadri	30 January 2022	24 January 2024	27	14	7	6	51.85%	2022 FIFA World Cup – Group stage 2023 Africa Cup of Nations – Group stage
(Tunisia) Montasser Louhichi	26 January 2024	30 June 2024	4	1	3	0	25.00%	—N/a
(Tunisia) Faouzi Benzarti (4)	1 July 2024	22 October 2024	4	2	1	1	50.00%	—N/a
(Tunisia) Kais Yaâkoubi	5 November 2024	18 November 2024	2	1	0	1	50.00%	—N/a
(Tunisia) Sami Trabelsi (2)	10 February 2025	4 January 2026	19	11	5	3	57.89%	2025 FIFA Arab Cup – Group stage 2025 Africa Cup of Nations – Round of 16
(France) Sabri Lamouchi	14 January 2026	16 June 2026	5	1	1	3	20.00%	—N/a
(France) Hervé Renard	16 June 2026	4 July 2026	2	0	0	2	00.00%	2026 FIFA World Cup – Group stage
(Tunisia) Mouin Chaâbani	28 July 2026	present	4	0	3	1	00.00%	—N/a

== Statistics ==
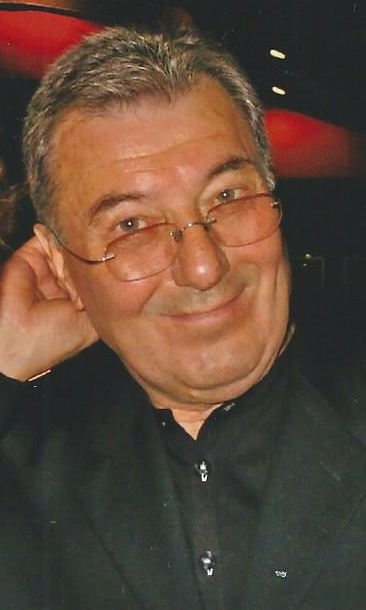
Roger Lemerre led the team to win the only Africa Cup of Nations in 2004.

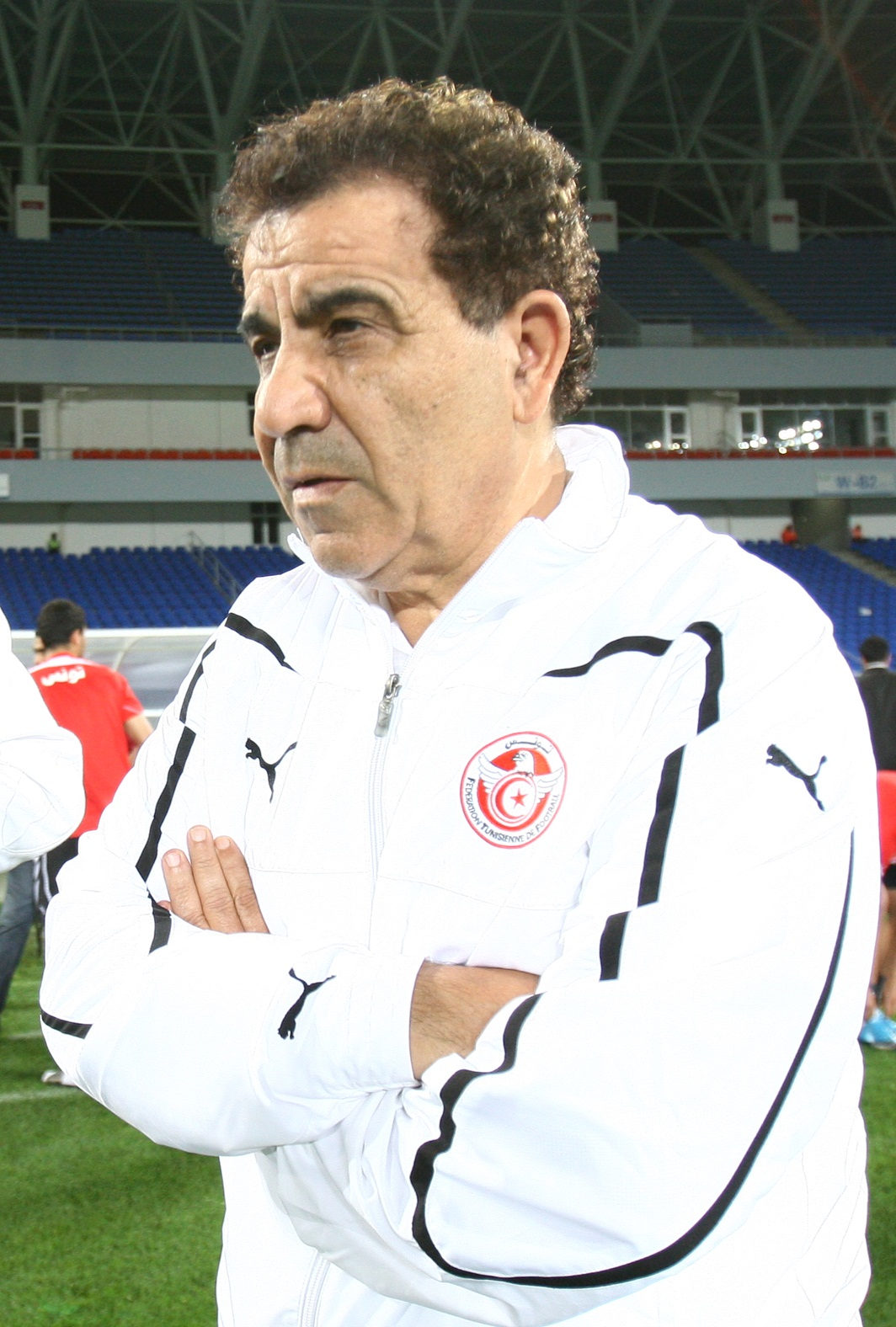
Faouzi Benzarti is the only coach to take charge of Tunisia in four terms.

	Nat	Manager	Stats
First coach	(Tunisia)	Rachid Turki	1956
Longest period	(France)	Roger Lemerre	5 years, 280 days
Shortest period	(Tunisia)	Faouzi Benzarti (1)	4 days
Most matches	(France)	Roger Lemerre	67 matches
Less matches	(Tunisia)	Faouzi Benzarti (1)	1 match
Most wins	(France)	Roger Lemerre	40 wins
Most defeats	(Poland)	Henryk Kasperczak (1)	18 defeats
Highest win%	(Tunisia)	Faouzi Benzarti (3)	100.00%
Lowest win%	(Socialist Federal Republic of Yugoslavia) (Tunisia) (Netherlands) (Tunisia)	Sereta Begović; Ammar Souayah; Ruud Krol; Faouzi Benzarti (1&2)	0.00%

=== By nationality ===
Country	Managers
Tunisia	19
France	8
Poland	3
Yugoslavia	3
Algeria	1
Belgium	1
Croatia	1
Germany	1
Hungary	1
Italy	1
Netherlands	1
Portugal	1

== Controversies ==
=== Coaching crisis (2024–present) ===
Starting from January 2024, the team faced a coaching crisis, with three different coaches taking charge in succession following the dismissal of Jalel Kadri on 24 January, in the wake of the team's elimination from the group stage of the 2023 Africa Cup of Nations. Montasser Louhichi was appointed temporarily on 26 January for two friendly matches in march and the third and fourth matchdays of the 2026 FIFA World Cup qualification in june. On 1 July Faouzi Benzarti was appointed to coach the team, this is the fourth time he had taken over the task in his career, leading the team in four matches of the 2025 Africa Cup of Nations qualification after two wins, a draw and a defeat, he resigned from his position on 22 October and was replaced by his assistant Kais Yaâkoubi temporarily on 5 November, leading the team during the fifth and sixth days of the Afcon qualifiers, where he led the team to qualify after a win and a defeat, who did not remain in his position thereafter.

In early January 2025, the FIFA Normalization Committee of the Tunisian Football Federation attempted to conclude a contract with Portuguese coach Carlos Queiroz, who had come to Tunisia to negotiate the deal. Despite his financial concessions, the deal fell through after the authorities intervened due to the large amount of the contract, estimated at 500,000 dinars per month. On 10 February, the federation announced the return of Sami Trabelsi as the team's coach for the second time in his career, twelve years after his departure. Under his leadership, the team entered a period of stability, successfully qualifying for the 2026 FIFA World Cup by winning their remaining six qualifying matches without conceding any goals and securing a historic 1–1 draw against Brazil on 18 November. Trabelsi then led the team into the 2025 FIFA Arab Cup, where they were eliminated in the group stage following one win, one draw, and one defeat. On 4 January 2026, Trabelsi was dismissed following the team's elimination in the Round of 16 of the 2025 Africa Cup of Nations against Mali.

On 14 January, the French-Tunisian Sabri Lamouchi was appointed to coach the team, amid harsh criticism stemming from his earlier refusal to represent Tunisia during his playing career. During the preparations for the 2026 World Cup, the team experienced a collapse; in March, they secured a 1–0 victory against Haiti and a 0–0 draw against Canada, but subsequently, in June, they suffered a 0–1 defeat to Austria and a crushing 0–5 loss to Belgium. On 16 June, Lamouchi was dismissed following a heavy 1–5 defeat to Sweden in the opening match of the World Cup, the team's worst-ever loss in the tournament. On the same day, Frenc coach Hervé Renard was appointed as the team's coach for the upcoming World Cup matches, with the possibility of an extension thereafter. The team was defeated 0–4 by Japan and 1–3 by the Netherlands, marking its worst-ever World Cup performance. On 4 July, Renard announced his resignation as head coach after a brief 18-day tenure.

On 28 July, Mouin Chaâbani was appointed as the team's head coach for the 2027 Africa Cup of Nations qualification, following the termination of his contract with Morocco’s RS Berkane.
