= Lotfi Sebti =

Tunisian football player and coach (died 2020)

Personal information
- Full name: Lotfi Sebti
- Date of birth: 1968
- Place of birth: Ben Gardane
- Date of death: 26 September 2020
- Position: Midfielder

Team information
- Current team: Al Jeel Club

Managerial career
- Years: Team
- 1998–1999: US Ben Guerdane
- 2003–2004: US Ben Guerdane
- 2005–2006: US Ben Guerdane
- Jul 2007 – Feb 2008: US Ben Guerdane
- Jul 2008 – Oct 2009: US Ben Guerdane
- Jan 2010 – Jun 2011: ES Jerba Midoun
- Jul 2011 – Dec 2012: CO Médenine
- 2012 – Apr 2013: US Ben Guerdane
- 2013: EO Sidi Bouzid
- Aug 2013–2014: EO Sidi Bouzid
- Jul 2014 – Oct 2015: US Ben Guerdane
- Jan 2016 – Oct 2016: Olympique Béja
- Nov 2016 – Mar 2017: EGS Gafsa
- Mar 2017 – Jun 2017: Stade Tunisien
- Jul 2017 – Nov 2017: CS Hammam-Lif
- Nov 2017 – Jun 2018: AS Marsa
- 2018–2019: Al Jeel Club

Lotfi Sebti (Arabic: لطفي السبتي; born 1968)(died 26 September 2020) was a Tunisian professional football manager and former player. He is a brother of Slaheddine Sebti.
