= Tunisian Coupe de la Ligue Professionnelle =

Tunisian football competition

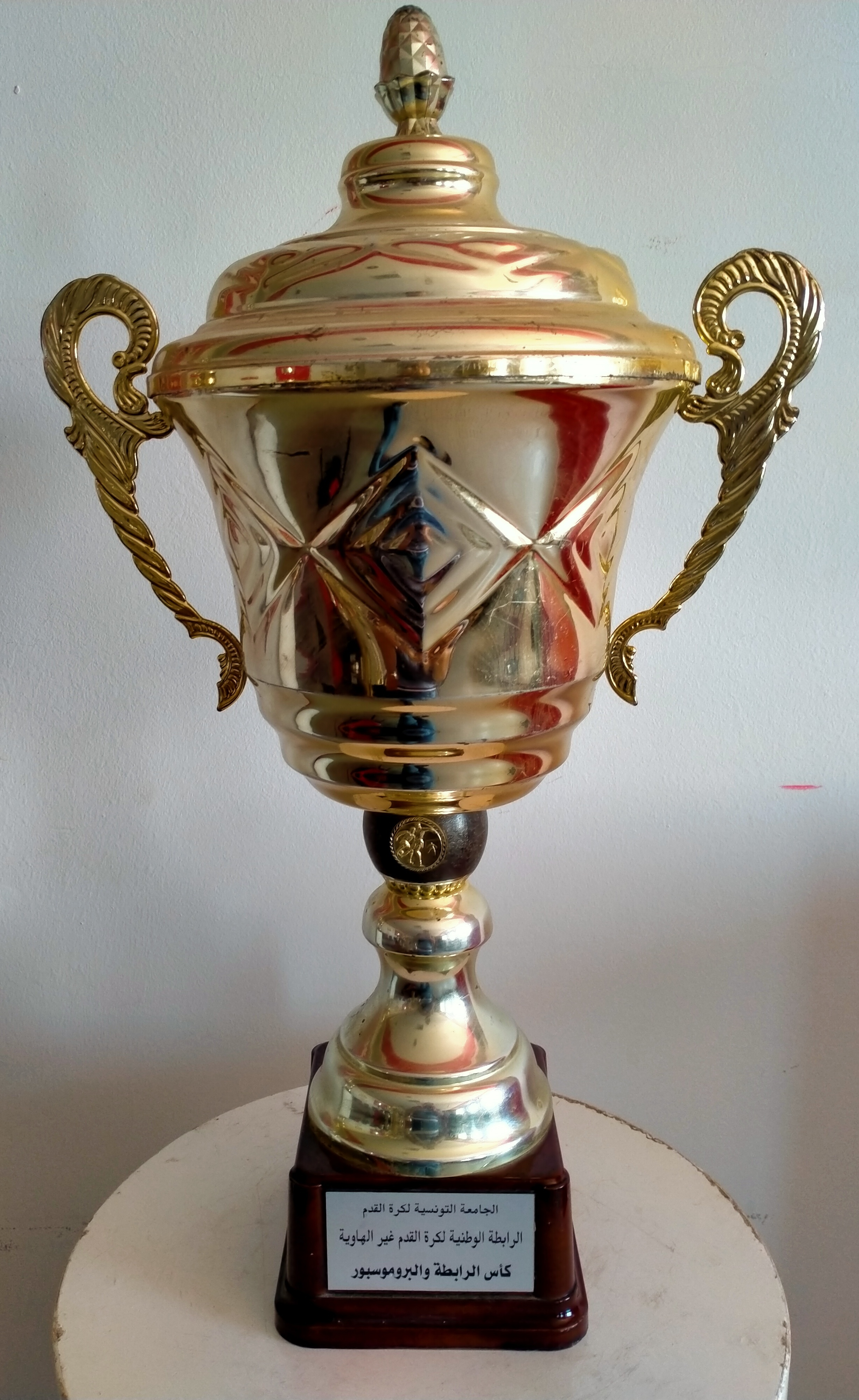
- Trophy of the 2004–05 season.
- Organiser(s): National Professional Football League; Tunisian Football Federation
- Founded: 1999
- Abolished: 2007
- Region: Tunisia
- Most championships: Stade Tunisien; ES Jerba (2titles each)

The Tunisian Coupe de la Ligue Professionnelle was a knockout football competition contested by Tunisian league clubs between 1999 and 2007, organized annually by the Tunisian Football Federation (FTF) and the National Professional Football League (LNFP). The tournament was first held during the 1999–2000 season, featuring teams from the top two tiers of the Tunisian league system, Pro League 1 and Pro League 2. The tournament was not held during the 2005–06 season, but for the following season, it was split into two separate competitions: the Pro League 1 Cup and the Pro League 2 Cup, each featuring teams from the corresponding league tier, with this final edition concluded the tournament's history.

Stade Tunisien and ES Jerba emerging as the most successful clubs, each having won the competition twice.

== Finals ==
Defined on penalty shoot-out

=== Pro League Cup finals ===
During the 2000–01 season, the Tunisia U-23 team was invited to play in the competition and reached the final match.

Season	Winner	Score	Runner-up	Date	Stadium
1999–2000	Stade Tunisien	1–0	CS Sfaxien	10 June 2000	El Menzah Stadium, Tunis
2000–01	ES Jerba	1–0	Tunisia U-23 team	31 May 2001	El Menzah Stadium, Tunis
2001–02	Stade Tunisien	3–2	ES Beni-Khalled	19 May 2002	El Menzah Stadium, Tunis
2002–03	CS Sfaxien	2–0	Olympique Béja	8 June 2003	Chedly Zouiten Stadium, Tunis
2003–04	CA Bizertin	0–0 (a.e.t.) (7–6 p)	Olympique Béja	6 June 2004	Chedly Zouiten Stadium, Tunis
2004–05	Étoile du Sahel	3–1	CA Bizertin	17 June 2005	Chedly Zouiten Stadium, Tunis
2005–06	Not played				

=== Pro League 1 Cup final ===
Season	Winner	Score	Runner-up	Date	Stadium
2006–07	AS Marsa	0–0 (a.e.t.) (3–2 p)	CS Hammam-Lif	17 June 2007	El Menzah Stadium, Tunis

=== Pro League 2 Cup final ===
Season	Winner	Score	Runner-up	Date	Stadium
2006–07	ES Jerba	1–1 (a.e.t.) (4–3 p)	Jendouba Sport	11 June 2007	

== See also ==
- Tunisian Cup
- Tunisian Super Cup
