= Lassaad Maamar =

Tunisian football manager (born 1968)

Personal information
- Date of birth: 10 April 1968 (age 58)
- Place of birth: Tunis, Tunisia

Team information
- Current team: MB Rouissat (head coach)

Managerial career
- Years: Team
- 2004–2005: ES Zarzis
- 2005–2006: AS Djerba
- 2007–2008: ES Zarzis
- 2008–2009: JS Kairouan
- 2010: Stade Gabèsien
- 2010–2011: Al-Wahda SC
- 2012: AS Gabès
- 2012–2013: ES Zarzis
- 2013–2014: CS Korba
- 2015: EO Sidi Bouzid
- 2015–2016: Al-Fayha FC
- 2016: EO Sidi Bouzid
- 2016–2017: Al-Ahly Shendi
- 2017: ES Zarzis
- 2018: CO Médenine
- 2019: DRB Tadjenanet
- 2021–2022: NC Magra
- 2023: AS Soliman
- 2023: Wej SC
- 2026: MB Rouissat

Lassaad Maamar (Arabic: لسعد معمر; born 10 April 1968) is a Tunisian football manager.
