= ES Zarzis =

Tunisian football club

- Full name: Espérance Sportive de Zarzis
- Nicknames: The Blood and Gold / Taraji El Janoub /El Akkara
- Short name: ESZ
- Founded: 1934; 92 years ago
- Ground: Abdessalam Kazouz Stadium
- Capacity: 10,000
- Chairman: Hafedh Taleb
- Manager: Mohamed Ali Maalej
- League: Tunisian Ligue Professionnelle 1
- 2025–26: Ligue 1, 6th of 16
- Website: esperance-sportive-de-zarzis.web.app
Home colours	Away colours	Third colours

Espérance Sportive de Zarzis (Arabic: الترجي الرياضي الجرجيسي known as ES Zarzis or simply ESZ for short, is a Tunisian football club based in Zarzis. The club was founded in 1934 by Haj Ali Bouchhioua and its colours are yellow, red and black. Their home stadium, Abdessalam Kazouz Stadium, has a capacity of 10,000 spectators. The club is currently playing in the Tunisian Ligue Professionnelle 1.

== Current squad ==
As of 22 September 2026

Note: Flags indicate national team as defined under FIFA eligibility rules; some limited exceptions apply. Players may hold more than one non-FIFA nationality.

No.	Pos.	Nation	Player
3	DF	TUN	Yassine Laariadh
4	DF	TUN	Oussama Bahri
5	MF	TUN	Moatez Chouchane
6	MF	TUN	Koumi Khalfa
7	FW	TUN	Hamdi Labidi
8	MF	TUN	Ryayne Sghaier
9	FW	TUN	Youssef Snana
10	MF	TUN	Nassim Douihech
11	MF	TUN	Mohamed Youssef Bousoukaya
15	DF	TUN	Seifedine Sabeur
16	GK	TUN	Mohamed Amine Hazgui
18	FW	TUN	Yosri Dhaflaoui
19	FW	NGR	Nwoke Kelechi

No.	Pos.	Nation	Player
21	MF	TUN	Mohamed Belghith
22	GK	TUN	Saifeddine Charfi
23	MF	NGR	Ambrose Ochigbo
24	DF	TUN	Houssem Hassen Romdhane
25	DF	SEN	Fallou Mendy
26	FW	BFA	Clavert Kiendrebeogo
27	MF	TUN	Amir Tajourii
28	DF	TUN	Lamjed Rjili
29	DF	SEN	Samba Diouf
30	MF	TUN	Youssef Mosrati
32	GK	TUN	Hamza Ghanmi
34	MF	ALG	Mourad Hakem

== Achievements ==
=== Performance in national & domestic competitions ===
- Tunisia Cup: 1

2005

=== Performance in CAF competitions ===
- CAF Confederation Cup: 1 appearance

2006 – First round

== Coaching history ==
- 1981–82:

(Tunisia) Thamer Ksiksi
(Tunisia) Mohamed Ali Ben Jeddi
(Tunisia) Bouzommita

- 1982–83:

(Bulgaria) Vassil Romanov

- 1983–84:

(Bulgaria) Vassil Romanov

- 1984–85:

(Bulgaria) Vassil Romanov

- 1985–86:

(Tunisia) Moncef Arfaoui

- 1987–88:

(Bulgaria) Dimitar Milev

- 1988–89:

(Bulgaria) Dimitar Milev

- 1989–90:

(Tunisia) Tahar Bellamine
(Tunisia) Belhassen Meriah

- 1990–91:

(Bulgaria) Dimitar Milev

- 1991–92:

(Bulgaria) Dimitar Milev
(Tunisia) Mokhtar Tlili

- 1992–93:

(Bulgaria) Dimitar Milev
(Tunisia) Habib Masmoudi
(Tunisia) Ferid Laaroussi
(Tunisia) Mokhtar Tlili

- 1994–95:

(Tunisia) Ridha Akacha

- 1995–96:

(Tunisia) Taoufik Ben Othman
(Tunisia) Mokhtar Tlili
(Tunisia) Khaled Ben Yahya

- 1996–97:

(Tunisia) Riadh Charfi
(Tunisia) Moncef Arfaoui
(Tunisia) Tijani Mcharek

- 1997–98:

(Tunisia) Habib Mejri
(Tunisia) Tijani Mcharek
(Tunisia) Mokhtar Tlili

- 1998–99:

(France) Serge Devèze
(Tunisia) Mohamed Sraieb

- 1999–00:

(Tunisia) Ridha Akacha
(Poland) Kazimiro

- 2000–01:

(Tunisia) Ridha Akacha
(Tunisia) Tijani Mcharek

- 2001–02:

(France) Serge Devèze
(Tunisia) Mohamed Sraieb
(Tunisia) Noureddine Laabidi
(Tunisia) Mrad Mahjoub

- 2002–03:

(Tunisia) Mrad Mahjoub
(Tunisia) Moncef Arfaoui
(Tunisia) Khaled Ben Yahya
(Tunisia) Moncef Mcharek
(Tunisia) Mohamed Ben Sliman

- 2003–04:

(Tunisia) Ridha Akacha
(Tunisia) Ahmed Labiedh
(Tunisia) Lassaad Maamer

- 2004–05:

(Tunisia) Lassaad Maamer

- 2005–06:

(Tunisia) Mohamed Sraieb
(France) Jean-Michel Bruyer

- 2006–07:

(Algeria) Abdelhak Benchikha

- 2007–09:

(Tunisia) Moncef Chargui
(Tunisia) Mokhtar Tlili
(Tunisia) Ahmed Labiedh
(Tunisia) Lassaad Maamer

- 2009–10:

(Tunisia) Jalel Kadri
(Algeria) A. Ait Djoudi (Oct 2009 – Dec 2009)
(Tunisia) Sofiène Hidoussi

- 2010–11:

(Tunisia) Chiheb Ellili (July 2010 – June 2011)

- 2011–12:

(Tunisia) Tarek Thabet (July 2011 – Dec 2011)
(Tunisia) N. Bourguiba (interim) (Dec 2011)
(Tunisia) Ghazi Ghrairi (Dec 2011 – June 2012)

- 2012–13:

(Spain) Ladislas Lozano (July 2012 – Oct 2012)
(Tunisia) Kamel Zouaghi (Oct 2012 – Dec 2012)
(Tunisia) Lassaad Maamer (Dec 2012–)
