= ES Beni-Khalled =

Tunisian football club

Étoile de Béni Khalled
- Full name: Étoile Sportive de Béni Khalled
- Nickname: ESBK
- Founded: 1946
- Ground: Stade de Béni Khalled; Béni Khalled
- Capacity: 4,000
- Chairman: Saïd Boujebel
- League: Ligue 2
- 2025–26: Ligue 3 Group A, 1th
Home colours	Away colours

Étoile Sportive de Béni Khalled (Arabic: النجم الرياضي ببني خلاد) is a Tunisian football club, based in the city of Béni Khalled in northeast Tunisia.

== Current squad ==
Note: Flags indicate national team as defined under FIFA eligibility rules; some limited exceptions apply. Players may hold more than one non-FIFA nationality.

No.	Pos.	Nation	Player
-	MF	CMR	Franck Essomba
-	DF	TUN	Hamza Testouri
-	DF	TUN	Hamdi Chourabi
-	MF	TUN	Mohamed Amara
-		TUN	Walid Khelifa
-		TUN	Nooman Lefkih
-		TUN	Anis El Mekki
-		TUN	Ramzi El Hif
-		TUN	Mondher Chemmem
-		TUN	Mohamed Amine El Werghemmi
-		TUN	Oussema Ben Hmida
-		TUN	Slim El Héni
-		TUN	Makrem Tajouri (Vice-captain)
-		TUN	Houssem Djerbi
-		TUN	Nader Ben Arbia

No.	Pos.	Nation	Player
-		TUN	Wassef Moussa
-		TUN	Bilel Sola
-		TUN	Mehdi Kelboussi
-		TUN	Walid Bou Zarrâa
-		TUN	Souheib Charradi
-		TUN	Sabri Testouri
-		TUN	Mohamed Ben Neji
-		TUN	Aymen Denden
-		TUN	Aymen Rachid
-		TUN	Anouer Jedidi
-		TUN	Ben Ali Mohamed Ali
-		TUN	Firas Abid
-		TUN	Riadh Saïdi
-	FW	LES	Ralekoti Mokhahlane (on loan from Stade Tunisien)

== Managers ==
- Abderrazak Aloui (1964–67)
- Driss Aloui (1967–68)
- Hammadi Jaouahdou (1976–77)
- Kilani Derouiche (1977–78)
- Rejeb Sayeh (1979–81)
- Mohamed Mensi and Mohamed Gritli (1981–82)
- Mohamed Mensi (1982–83)
- Ahmed Aleya and Mustapha Derouiche (1983–84)
- Kilani Derouiche (1984–85)
- Kilani Derouiche and Mustapha Derouiche (1985–86)
- Amor Amri, Mustapha Derouiche then Rejeb Sayeh (1986–87)
- Rejeb Sayeh (1987–89)
- Salem Kraïem then Mustapha Derouiche (1989–90)
- Ali Rached (1990–91)
- Mustapha Derouiche (1991–92)
- Ali Kaabi, Mustapha Derouiche then Ali Sraïeb (1992–93)
- Mahmoud Bacha (1993–94)
- Kilani Derouiche (1994–95)
- Ali Kaabi then Mahmoud Bacha (1995–96)
- Wahid Hidoussi and Abderrahmane Rahmouni (1996–97)
- Ali Kaabi then Moncef Arfaoui (1997–98)
- Moncef Arfaoui, Ali Kaabi, Mokhtar Tlili, Mustapha Derouiche then Moncef Arfaoui (1998–99)
- Mahmoud Bacha and Noureddine Laabidi (1999–00)
- Ali Sraïeb and Belghith and Ali Kaabi (2000–01)
- Ali Kaabi then Farid Ben Belgacem (2001–02)
- Khaled Ben Sassi (2002–03)
- Khaled Ben Sassi and Kamel Chebli and Mahmoud Bacha and Khaled Ben Sassi (2003–04)
- Khaled Ben Sassi and Habib Mejri (2004–05)
- Mahmoud Ouertani and Chedly Mlik and Mahmoud Bacha (2005–06)
- Chaker Meftah and Fayçal Mekki and Lassaad Habib (2006–07)
- Kilani Derouiche and Fayçal Mekki and Lassaad Habib then Ezzeddine Khémila (2007–08)
- Wajdi Essid and Salem Tabbassi and Mejdi Kordi (2008–09)
- Ali Ben Néji, Ezzedine Khémila then Kais Yâakoubi (2009–10)
- Lotfi Kadri (2010–11)
- Sofiène Hidoussi (2011–)
