= Mohamed Khadheri =

Tunisian footballer

Personal information
- Date of birth: 11 July 1987 (age 39)
- Position: Defender

Senior career*
Years	Team	Apps	(Gls)
2008–2012	CS Hammam-Lif		
2012–2014	CA Bizertin		
2014–2015	EGS Gafsa		
2016–2017	CS Hammam-Lif		
2018–2020	ES Métlaoui		
- * Club domestic league appearances and goals

Mohamed Khadheri (born 11 July 1987) is a retired Tunisian football defender.
