= Karim Touati =

Tunisian footballer

Personal information
- Date of birth: 20 March 1985 (age 41)
- Position: Defender

Senior career*
Years	Team	Apps	(Gls)
2006–2007	CA Bizertin		
2007–2008	Espérance de Tunis		
2008–2009	CA Bizertin		
2009–2010	EGS Gafsa		
- * Club domestic league appearances and goals

Karim Touati (born 20 March 1985) is a Tunisian football defender.
