= Louhichi =

Louhichi is a Tunisian surname that may refer to the following notable people:

- Montasser Louhichi (born 1974), Tunisian football manager
- Taïeb Louhichi (1948–2018), Tunisian film director, screenwriter, producer and filmmaker
