= Zied Ben Salem =

Tunisian footballer (born 1995)

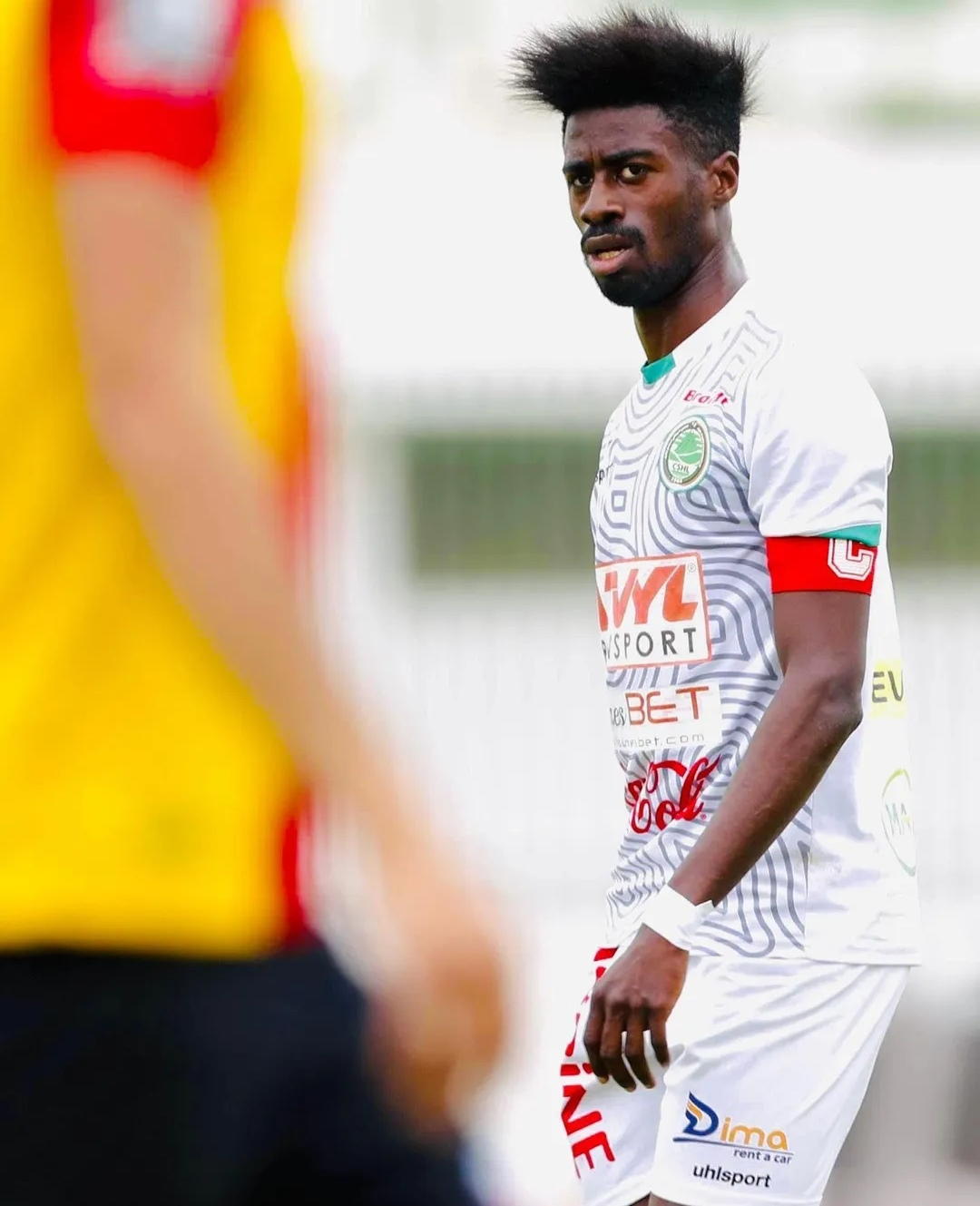
- Ben Salem in 2022

Personal information
- Date of birth: 21 February 1995 (age 31)
- Place of birth: Tunis, Tunisia
- Position: Left winger

Team information
- Current team: Al-Qadisiyah
- Number: 16

Youth career
- ES Radès

Senior career*
Years	Team	Apps	(Gls)
2015–2016	ES Radès	0	(0)
2016–2017	Stade Tunisien	0	(0)
2017–2023	CS Hammam-Lif	45	(9)
2020	→ Burgan SC (loan)		
2021	→ Arar FC (loan)		
2023	CS Sfaxien	4	(0)
2023–2024	Al-Rawdhah		
2024–2025	Al-Watani		
2025–2026	ES Métlaoui	10	(0)
2026–	Al-Qadisiyah	4	(0)
- * Club domestic league appearances and goals as of 02:50, 20 March 2026 (UTC)

Zied Ben Salem (Arabic: زياد بن سالم; born 21 February 1995) is a Tunisian professional footballer who plays as a left winger for Libyan Premier League club Al-Qadisiyah.
