= Haiti at the Copa América =

The Copa América is South America's major tournament in senior men's football and determines the continental champion. Until 1967, the tournament was known as South American Championship. It is the oldest continental championship in the world.

Haiti are not members of the South American football confederation CONMEBOL. But because CONMEBOL only has ten member associations, guest nations have regularly been invited since 1993.

== Record at the Copa América ==
Copa América record
Year	Round	Position	Pld	W	D*	L	GF	GA
(Ecuador) 1993^{1}	Not invited							
(Uruguay) 1995	Not invited							
(Bolivia) 1997	Not invited							
(Paraguay) 1999	Not invited							
(Colombia) 2001	Not invited							
(Peru) 2004	Not invited							
(Venezuela) 2007	Not invited							
(Argentina) 2011	Not invited							
(Chile) 2015	Not invited							
(United States) 2016^{2}	Group stage	16th	3	0	0	3	1	12
(Brazil) 2019	Not invited							
(Brazil) 2021	Not invited							
(United States) 2024	Did not qualify							
Total	Group stage	1/13	3	0	0	3	1	12

^{1} Ecuador 1993 was the first time nations from outside the CONMEBOL were invited.
^{2} United States 2016 was the first time nations from outside the CONMEBOL could qualify and host.

== Copa América Centenario ==
=== Group B ===
Pos	Team	Pld	W	D	L	GF	GA	GD	Pts	Qualification
1	Peru	3	2	1	0	4	2	+2	7	Advance to knockout stage
2	Ecuador	3	1	2	0	6	2	+4	5	Advance to knockout stage
3	Brazil	3	1	1	1	7	2	+5	4	
4	Haiti	3	0	0	3	1	12	−11	0	

Source: CONMEBOL & CONCACAF

=== Haiti vs Peru ===
The two teams had met in four previous encounters, the last being a friendly in 2003 won by Peru 3–0. Both teams faced each other in an official tournament for the second time in history, after a 1–1 draw in a 2000 CONCACAF Gold Cup group stage match. This match marked Haiti's debut in Copa América, making them the second Caribbean team to appear at the tournament, after Jamaica in 2015.

4 June 2016
19:30

Haiti	0–1	Peru
	Report (CONMEBOL); Report (CONCACAF)	Guerrero 61'

CenturyLink Field, Seattle
Attendance: 20,190
Referee: John Pitti (Panama)

Haiti	Peru

GK	1	Johny Placide (c)
RB	8	Réginal Goreux
CB	5	Romain Genevois
CB	3	Mechack Jérôme
LB	4	Kim Jaggy
CM	10	Jeff Louis
CM	14	James Marcelin	(yellow card) 75'
CM	13	Kevin Lafrance
RW	19	Max Hilaire		(substituted off) 39'
CF	20	Duckens Nazon		(substituted off) 70'
LW	7	Wilde-Donald Guerrier
Substitutions:
MF	16	Jean Alexandre	(yellow card) 50'	(substituted on) 39'
FW	9	Kervens Belfort		(substituted on) 70'
Manager:
(France) Patrice Neveu

GK	1	Pedro Gallese
RB	4	Renzo Revoredo
CB	2	Alberto Rodríguez	(yellow card) 29'
CB	15	Christian Ramos
LB	6	Miguel Trauco
CM	13	Renato Tapia
CM	16	Óscar Vílchez
RW	21	Alejandro Hohberg		(substituted off) 83'
AM	10	Christian Cueva		(substituted off) 75'
LW	20	Edison Flores		(substituted off) 90+1'
CF	9	Paolo Guerrero (c)	(yellow card) 69'
Substitutions:
MF	19	Yoshimar Yotún	(yellow card) 84'	(substituted on) 75'
MF	8	Andy Polo		(substituted on) 83'
MF	7	Luiz da Silva		(substituted on) 90+1'
Manager:
(Argentina) Ricardo Gareca

Man of the Match:
Paolo Guerrero (Peru)

Assistant referees:
Gabriel Victoria (Panama)
Christian Ramírez (Honduras)
Fourth official:
Armando Villarreal (United States)
Fifth official:
Hiran Dopico (Cuba)

=== Brazil vs Haiti ===
The two teams had met in only two previous occasions, both friendlies, the last held at the Stade Sylvio Cator in Port-au-Prince in 2004, which Brazil won 6–0.

8 June 2016
19:30

Brazil	7–1	Haiti
Coutinho 14', 29', 90+2'; Renato Augusto 35', 86'; Gabriel 59'; Lucas Lima 67'	Report (CONMEBOL); Report (CONCACAF)	Marcelin 70'

Camping World Stadium, Orlando
Attendance: 28,241
Referee: Mark Geiger (United States)

Brazil	Haiti

GK	1	Alisson
RB	2	Dani Alves (c)
CB	13	Marquinhos
CB	4	Gil
LB	6	Filipe Luís
DM	5	Casemiro	(yellow card) 38'	(substituted off) 62'
CM	8	Elias		(substituted off) 71'
CM	18	Renato Augusto
RW	19	Willian
LW	22	Philippe Coutinho
CF	9	Jonas		(substituted off) 46'
Substitutions:
FW	11	Gabriel		(substituted on) 46'
MF	10	Lucas Lima		(substituted on) 62'
MF	17	Walace		(substituted on) 71'
Manager:
Dunga

GK	1	Johny Placide (c)
CB	3	Mechack Jérôme
CB	5	Romain Genevois
CB	8	Réginal Goreux	(yellow card) 25'
RWB	2	Jean Sony Alcénat		(substituted off) 82'
LWB	4	Kim Jaggy
CM	14	James Marcelin
CM	13	Kevin Lafrance
CM	16	Jean Alexandre		(substituted off) 62'
CF	10	Jeff Louis
CF	9	Kervens Belfort		(substituted off) 51'
Substitutions:
FW	20	Duckens Nazon		(substituted on) 51'
MF	19	Max Hilaire		(substituted on) 62'
FW	21	Jean-Eudes Maurice		(substituted on) 82'
Manager:
(France) Patrice Neveu

Man of the Match:
Philippe Coutinho (Brazil)

Assistant referees:
Joseph Fletcher (Canada)
Charles Morgante (United States)
Fourth official:
Roberto García Orozco (Mexico)
Fifth official:
José Luis Camargo (Mexico)

=== Ecuador vs Haiti ===
The two teams had met in four previous encounters, the last being a friendly in 2008, which Ecuador won 3–1. This was the second match between both teams in an official tournament, as they already faced each other in a 2002 CONCACAF Gold Cup group stage match, won by Haiti 2–0.

12 June 2016
18:30

Ecuador	4–0	Haiti
E. Valencia 11'; J. Ayoví 20'; Noboa 57'; A. Valencia 78'	Report (CONMEBOL); Report (CONCACAF)

MetLife Stadium, East Rutherford
Attendance: 50,976
Referee: Gery Vargas (Bolivia)

Ecuador	Haiti

GK	22	Alexander Domínguez
RB	4	Juan Carlos Paredes
CB	2	Arturo Mina
CB	3	Frickson Erazo
LB	10	Walter Ayoví (c)
CM	16	Antonio Valencia
CM	6	Christian Noboa
CM	18	Carlos Gruezo	(substituted off) 79'
RW	17	Jaime Ayoví	(substituted off) 46'
CF	13	Enner Valencia	(substituted off) 84'
LW	7	Jefferson Montero
Substitutions:
FW	19	Juan Cazares	(substituted on) 46'
MF	8	Fernando Gaibor	(substituted on) 79'
MF	9	Fidel Martínez	(substituted on) 84'
Manager:
(Bolivia) Gustavo Quinteros

GK	1	Johny Placide (c)
RB	6	Stéphane Lambese
CB	5	Romain Genevois	(yellow card) 90+2'
CB	3	Mechack Jérôme
LB	4	Kim Jaggy
RM	21	Jean-Eudes Maurice
CM	13	Kevin Lafrance	(yellow card) 37'	(substituted off) 71'
CM	14	James Marcelin		(substituted off) 79'
LM	15	Sony Norde
CF	20	Duckens Nazon
CF	9	Kervens Belfort		(substituted off) 70'
Substitutions:
FW	10	Jeff Louis		(substituted on) 70'
MF	19	Max Hilaire		(substituted on) 71'
MF	16	Jean Alexandre		(substituted on) 79'
Manager:
(France) Patrice Neveu

Man of the Match:
Enner Valencia (Ecuador)

Assistant referees:
Javier Bustillos (Bolivia)
Juan Pablo Montaño (Bolivia)
Fourth official:
Patricio Loustau (Argentina)
Fifth official:
Ezequiel Brailovsky (Argentina)

== See also ==
- Haiti at the CONCACAF Gold Cup
- Haiti at the FIFA World Cup
