= Sofiène Hidoussi =

Tunisian football manager

Personal information
- Date of birth: 23 July 1970 (age 56)

Team information
- Current team: Paradou AC (head coach)

Managerial career
- Years: Team
- 2007–2008: Emirates
- 2009: Fujairah
- 2010: JS Kairouan
- 2010–2011: Olympique Béja
- 2011: ES Beni-Khalled
- 2012: AS Gabès
- 2014: Stade Tunisien
- 2014: LPS Tozeur
- 2015–2016: US Ben Guerdane
- 2016: CA Bizertin
- 2016–2017: JS Kabylie
- 2017: US Ben Guerdane
- 2018: Club Africain (sporting director)
- 2019: JS Kairouan
- 2019–2020: JS Kairouan
- 2020: CA Bizertin
- 2021: JS Kairouan
- 2021–2022: CA Bizertin
- 2022: AS Marsa
- 2023: CA Bizertin
- 2023: CS Hammam-Lif
- 2024: EGS Gafsa
- 2024: Al Ta'awon SC
- 2024: EGS Gafsa
- 2024–2025: CA Bizertin
- 2025–: Paradou AC

Sofiène Hidoussi (born 23 July 1970) is a Tunisian football manager.
