= Maher Guizani =

Tunisian football manager

Team information
- Current team: Al-Nairyah (manager)

Managerial career
- Years: Team
- 2015: CO Transports
- 2015–2016: US Sbeitla
- 2016: US Siliana
- 2016: FC Hammamet
- 2016: AS Djerba
- 2016–2017: US Siliana
- 2017: Jendouba Sport
- 2017–2018: CS Hammam-Lif
- 2018: Olympique Béja
- 2018–2019: CS Chebba
- 2019: AS Marsa
- 2019–2020: ES Métlaoui
- 2021–2022: Al-Rawdhah
- 2022: CS Hammam-Lif
- 2022: AS Soliman
- 2022–2023: Al-Kawkab
- 2023–: Al-Nairyah

Maher Guizani is a Tunisian football manager who is the current manager of Saudi Arabian club Al-Nairyah.
