= José Paulo =

Brazilian football manager (born 1946)

Personal information
- Full name: José Paulo Rubim Augusto
- Date of birth: 26 July 1946 (age 80)
- Place of birth: Rio de Janeiro, Brazil

Managerial career
- Years: Team
- 1978–1980: Friburguense
- 1981: Hercílio Luz
- 1982–1984: Fluminense (assistant)
- 1985: Cabofriense
- 1985: America-RJ
- 1986: Liberia
- 1987–1988: China U23
- 1989–1990: Nacional
- 1990: Vasco da Gama (assistant)
- 1991–1993: Mbilinga
- 1993–1995: CS Sfaxien
- 1995–1996: Al-Riyadh
- 1996–1997: CS Sfaxien
- 1997: Khor Fakkan
- 1997: Al-Khaleej
- 1998–1999: Qatar U17
- 1999–2000: Qatar U23
- 1999: Al-Arabi
- 2000–2001: Al-Wakrah
- 2001–2002: Bizertin
- 2002: ES Sahel
- 2003–2004: Stade Tunisien
- 2004–2005: Bizertin
- 2005: Blida
- 2005–2006: Al-Sailiya
- 2006–2007: Bizertin
- 2007–2008: Al-Sailiya
- 2009: Al-Shamal
- 2009: Khor Fakkan
- 2010: Benin
- 2012: Al-Shamal

José Paulo Rubim Augusto (born 26 July 1946) is a Brazilian football manager and former player. In 2010 he was named head coach of Benin. He left the position later the same year.

== Managerial statistics ==
As of 7 May 2019.

Managerial record by team and tenure
Team	From	To	Record				
Team	From	To	P	W	D	L	Win %
Blida	2005	2005	8	2	2	4	25.0
Bizertin	2006	2007	9	1	2	6	11.1
Total			17	3	4	10	17.6
