= Majed Farasani =

Saudi football player

Personal information
- Full name: Majed Ali Sharaf Farasani
- Date of birth: January 18, 1984 (age 42)
- Place of birth: Saudi Arabia
- Height: 1.76 m (5 ft 9 1/2 in)
- Position: Defender

Senior career*
Years	Team	Apps	(Gls)
2005–2007	Al-Orobah		
2007–2015	Al-Raed	36	(0)
2015–2016	Al-Hazm		
2016–2017	Al-Kawkab		
- * Club domestic league appearances and goals

Majed Farasani (Arabic: ماجد فرساني; born January 18, 1984) is a Saudi football player who plays a defender.
