= Lotfi Kadri =

Tunisian football manager

Managerial career
- Years: Team
- 2013–2014: LPS Tozeur
- 2014: EGS Gafsa
- 2014: Stade Gabèsien
- 2015–2016: US Monastir
- 2016: CS M'saken
- 2016: Damac FC
- 2017–2018: EO Sidi Bouzid
- 2018-2019: AS Marsa
- 2019-2020: Olympique Beja
- 2022: CS Hammam-Lif
- 2022-2023: AS Marsa
- 2023-2025: JS Omrane

Lotfi Kadri is a Tunisian football manager.

== Honours ==
=== Managerial ===
JS Omrane

- Tunisian Ligue Professionnelle 2: 2023–24
