= Moncef Mcharek =

Tunisian football manager

Personal information
- Full name: Moncef Ben Mcharek

Managerial career
- Years: Team
- 2006–2008: Al-Orobah
- 2011–2013: Al-Fayha
- 2013–2014: ES Zarzis
- 2014–2018: Al-Kawkab
- 2019: ES Zarzis
- 2019–2020: Al-Kawkab
- 2020–2021: Al-Arabi
- 2021–2022: Al-Riyadh
- 2022–2023: Al-Taraji
- 2023: Najran
- 2023–2024: ES Zarzis

Moncef Mcharek (Arabic: المنصف بن مشارك) is a Tunisian football manager.
