= Hedi Mokrani =

Tunisian football manager

Team information
- Current team: AS Gabès (manager)

Managerial career
- Years: Team
- 2011: Olympique Béja
- 2013–2014: AS Gabès
- 2015: Olympique Béja
- 2015–2016: AS Gabès
- 2016–2017: Stade Tunisien
- 2017–2018: EGS Gafsa
- 2019: US Siliana
- 2019: AS Gabès

Hedi Mokrani is a Tunisian football manager.
