= Nader Ouarda =

Tunisian footballer (born 1974)

Nader Ouarda (born 21 June 1974) is a retired Tunisian footballer. He played as offensive midfielder. Following his playing career, he became a manager.

== Career ==
He has played for the following Tunisian clubs during the sixteen years of his career:

- 1992-1996 : Océano Club de Kerkennah
- 1996-1998 : Club africain
- 1998-2000 : El Makarem de Mahdia
- 2000-2001 : AS Kasserine
- 2001-2002 : Étoile Sportive du Sahel
- 2002-2003 : ES Beni-Khalled
- 2003-2005 : El Makarem de Mahdia
- 2005-2007 : Océano Club de Kerkennah
- 2007-2008 : Stade sportif sfaxien

He also participated in the rise of El Makarem de Mahdia in 2003-2004 and the rise of Océano Club de Kerkennah in 1995-1996, and Étoile sportive de Béni Khalled in 2002-2003.

Ouarda was also the captain of the Tunisia under-21 national team and played one game for the senior Tunisia national football team during 1994.

== Wins as player ==
- Arab Champions League
  - Winner: 1997
- Tunisian President Cup
  - Winner: 1998
- Tunisian Ligue Professionnelle 2
- Winner of (South Pole) : 1995-1996
- National C League cup
  - Winner:2005–2006
