= Fethi Laabidi =

Tunisian football manager

Personal information
- Place of birth: Kairouan, Tunisia

Team information
- Current team: Al Urooba Club (manager)

Managerial career
- Years: Team
- 2008–2009: CS Hammam-Lif
- 2011–2012: ES Hammam-Sousse
- 2012: Olympique Béja
- 2012: CS Hammam-Lif
- 2013: Club Africain
- 2013–2014: Club Africain (assistant)
- 2014: CS Hammam-Lif
- 2016: Ismaily SC (assistant)
- 2018–2020: Al-Najma SC
- 2020–: Al Urooba Club

Fethi Laabidi is a Tunisian football manager.
