= Louis Pinat =

French footballer (1929–2015)

Personal information
- Date of birth: 12 August 1929
- Place of birth: Boulogne-sur-Mer, France
- Date of death: 30 December 2015 (aged 86)
- Place of death: Villiers-le-Bel, France
- Height: 1.76 m (5 ft 9 in)
- Position: Goalkeeper

Youth career
- 1941–194?: Saint-Servan
- 194?–1949: Servannaise

Senior career*
Years	Team	Apps	(Gls)
1949–1958	Stade Rennais	229	(0)
1958–1959	Nantes	36	(0)
1959–1961	Forbach	56	(0)
Total		321	(0)

International career
- France B

Managerial career
- 1960–1961: Forbach (player manager)
- 1963–1965: Hammam-Lif
- * Club domestic league appearances and goals

Louis Pinat ( 12 August 1929 – 30 December 2015) was a French footballer who played as goalkeeper.

== Career statistics ==
=== Club ===
Appearances and goals by club, season and competition
Club	Season	League			Coupe de France		Coupe Drago		Total	
Club	Season	Division	Apps	Goals	Apps	Goals	Apps	Goals	Apps	Goals
Stade Rennais	1949–50	French Division 1	2	0	0	0	0	0	2	0
Stade Rennais	1950–51	French Division 1	7	0	0	0	0	0	7	0
Stade Rennais	1951–52	French Division 1	23	0	5	0	0	0	28	0
Stade Rennais	1952–53	French Division 1	33	0	1	0	1	0	35	0
Stade Rennais	1953–54	French Division 2	32	0	2	0	0	0	34	0
Stade Rennais	1954–55	French Division 2	20	0	1	0	0	0	21	0
Stade Rennais	1955–56	French Division 2	38	0	5	0	2	0	45	0
Stade Rennais	1956–57	French Division 1	37	0	2	0	1	0	40	0
Stade Rennais	1957–58	French Division 2	37	0	3	0	3	0	43	0
Stade Rennais	Total		229	0	19	0	7	0	255	0
Nantes	1958–59	French Division 2	36	0	0	0	0	0	36	0
Forbach	1959–60	French Division 2	32	0	0	0	0	0	32	0
Forbach	1960–61	French Division 2	24	0	0	0	0	0	24	0
Forbach	Total		56	0	0	0	0	0	56	0
Career total			321	0	19	0	7	0	347	0
