= Montasser Louhichi =

Tunisian football coach

Personal information
- Full name: Montasser Louhichi
- Date of birth: 4 February 1974 (age 52)
- Place of birth: Tunisia

Managerial career
- Years: Team
- 2014–2015: Club Africain (youth)
- 2016: Étoile du Sahel (assistant)
- 2017: AS Gabès
- 2018–2019: CA Bizertin
- 2019: Stade Tunisien
- 2021–2022: Club Africain
- 2023: Tunisia U20
- 2024: Tunisia (caretaker)
- 2024–: US Monastir

Montasser Louhichi (born 4 February 1974) is a Tunisian football manager.
