= Franck Essomba =

Cameroonian footballer

Personal information
- Full name: Franck Leopold Essomba Tchoungui
- Date of birth: 9 February 1987 (age 39)
- Place of birth: Douala, Cameroon
- Height: 1.76 m (5 ft 9 in)
- Position: Midfielder

Senior career*
Years	Team	Apps	(Gls)
- Authentic FC
2005–2007	Union Douala		
2008	US Bitam		
2008–2010	CABBA	28	(4)
2010–2011	Jagiellonia Białystok	15	(0)
2012	Beni-Khalled	7	(2)
2013	Olympique Béja	7	(2)
2014	AS Poissy		
2014	FC Versailles 78		
2014–2015	US Roye-Noyon	3	(0)
2017–2020	Mulhouse	55	(8)
- * Club domestic league appearances and goals

Franck Leopold Essomba Tchoungui (born 9 February 1987) is a Cameroonian former professional footballer who played as a midfielder.

== Career ==
=== Club ===
Essomba was born in Douala, Cameroon.

In summer 2010, he joined Polish club Jagiellonia Białystok on a one-year contract. After 2009–10 season, he was a free agent.

The last club he played for was FC Mulhouse in the Championnat National 2.
