= Haiti at the CONCACAF Gold Cup =

Haiti at North American football tournament

The CONCACAF Gold Cup is North America's major tournament in senior men's football and determines the continental champion. Until 1989, the tournament was known as CONCACAF Championship. It is currently held every two years. From 1996 to 2005, nations from other confederations have regularly joined the tournament as invitees. In earlier editions, the continental championship was held in different countries, but since the inception of the Gold Cup in 1991, the United States are constant hosts or co-hosts.

From 1973 to 1989, the tournament doubled as the confederation's World Cup qualification. CONCACAF's representative team at the FIFA Confederations Cup was decided by a play-off between the winners of the last two tournament editions in 2015 via the CONCACAF Cup, but was then discontinued along with the Confederations Cup.

Since the inaugural tournament in 1963, the Gold Cup was held 28 times and has been won by seven different nations, most often by Mexico (13 titles).

Haiti have won the tournament once, as hosts in 1973. That the success was not due to the home advantage alone, but had shown good results at the previous and following editions (1971 and 1977), where they each ended up as runners-up on both occasions. They are currently ranked tenth in the tournament's all-time table.

== Overall record ==
CONCACAF Championship & Gold Cup record										Qualification record					
Year	Result	Position	Pld	W	D*	L	GF	GA	Squad	Pld	W	D	L	GF	GA
(El Salvador) 1963	Did not qualify									2	0	0	2	1	4
(Guatemala) 1965	Sixth place	6th	5	0	1	4	3	13	Squad	Qualified automatically					
(Honduras) 1967	Fifth place	5th	5	1	0	4	5	9	Squad	4	3	1	0	7	3
(Costa Rica) 1969	Disqualified									2	2	0	0	3	0
(Trinidad and Tobago) 1971	Runners-up	2nd	5	2	3	0	9	1	Squad	Qualified automatically					
(Haiti) 1973	Champions	1st	5	4	0	1	8	3	Squad	2	2	0	0	12	0
(Mexico) 1977	Runners-up	2nd	5	3	1	1	6	6	Squad	7	5	2	0	19	3
(Honduras) 1981	Sixth place	6th	5	0	2	3	2	9	Squad	4	2	1	1	4	2
1985	Group stage	9th	4	0	0	4	0	9	Squad	2	1	0	1	5	2
1989	Did not enter									Did not enter					
(United States) 1991	Did not qualify									2	1	1	0	4	3
(Mexico) (United States) 1993	Did not enter									Did not enter					
(United States) 1996	Did not enter									Did not enter					
(United States) 1998	Withdrew									Withdrew					
(United States) 2000	Group stage	11th	2	0	1	1	1	4	Squad	10	6	1	3	22	11
(United States) 2002	Quarter-finals	7th	3	1	0	2	3	4	Squad	8	5	2	1	30	9
(Mexico) (United States) 2003	Did not qualify									5	3	0	2	7	6
(United States) 2005	Did not qualify									5	3	0	2	7	6
(United States) 2007	Group stage	10th	3	0	2	1	2	4	Squad	13	8	1	4	27	12
(United States) 2009	Quarter-finals	8th	4	1	1	2	4	7	Squad	3	1	1	1	4	4
(United States) 2011	Did not qualify									3	1	1	1	3	5
(United States) 2013	Group stage	9th	3	1	0	2	2	3	Squad	11	8	1	2	19	5
(Canada) (United States) 2015	Quarter-finals	6th	4	1	1	2	2	3	Squad	7	3	3	1	13	9
(United States) 2017	Did not qualify									6	4	0	2	15	14
(Costa Rica) (Jamaica) (United States) 2019	Semi-finals	3rd	5	4	0	1	9	5	Squad	4	4	0	0	19	2
(United States) 2021	Group stage	11th	3	1	0	2	3	6	Squad	6	2	3	2	13	6
(Canada) (United States) 2023	Group stage	12th	3	1	0	2	4	6	Squad	6	5	1	0	22	5
(Canada) (United States) 2025	Group stage	13th	3	0	1	2	2	4	Squad	6	6	0	0	29	5
Total	1 Title	17/28	67	20	13	34	65	96		118	74	19	25	285	116

== Match overview ==
Tournament	Round	Opponent	Score	Venue
(Guatemala) 1965	Final round	Guatemala	0–3	Guatemala City
(Guatemala) 1965	Final round	Costa Rica	1–3	Guatemala City
(Guatemala) 1965	Final round	Mexico	0–3	Guatemala City
(Guatemala) 1965	Final round	Netherlands Antilles	1–1	Guatemala City
(Guatemala) 1965	Final round	El Salvador	1–3	Guatemala City
(Honduras) 1967	Final round	Guatemala	1–2	Tegucigalpa
(Honduras) 1967	Final round	Trinidad and Tobago	2–3	Tegucigalpa
(Honduras) 1967	Final round	Nicaragua	2–1	Tegucigalpa
(Honduras) 1967	Final round	Mexico	0–1	Tegucigalpa
(Honduras) 1967	Final round	Honduras	0–2	Tegucigalpa
(Trinidad and Tobago) 1971	Final round	Mexico	0–0	Port of Spain
(Trinidad and Tobago) 1971	Final round	Costa Rica	0–0	Port of Spain
(Trinidad and Tobago) 1971	Final round	Trinidad and Tobago	6–0	Port of Spain
(Trinidad and Tobago) 1971	Final round	Honduras	3–1	Port of Spain
(Trinidad and Tobago) 1971	Final round	Cuba	0–0	Port of Spain
(Haiti) 1973	Final round	Netherlands Antilles	3–0	Port-au-Prince
(Haiti) 1973	Final round	Trinidad and Tobago	2–1	Port-au-Prince
(Haiti) 1973	Final round	Honduras	1–0	Port-au-Prince
(Haiti) 1973	Final round	Guatemala	2–1	Port-au-Prince
(Haiti) 1973	Final round	Mexico	0–1	Port-au-Prince
(Mexico) 1977	Final round	Mexico	1–4	Mexico City
(Mexico) 1977	Final round	Guatemala	2–1	Monterrey
(Mexico) 1977	Final round	El Salvador	1–0	Mexico City
(Mexico) 1977	Final round	Canada	1–1	Monterrey
(Mexico) 1977	Final round	Suriname	1–0	Mexico City
(Honduras) 1981	Final round	Honduras	0–4	Tegucigalpa
(Honduras) 1981	Final round	Canada	1–1	Tegucigalpa
(Honduras) 1981	Final round	Mexico	1–1	Tegucigalpa
(Honduras) 1981	Final round	Cuba	0–2	Tegucigalpa
(Honduras) 1981	Final round	El Salvador	0–1	Tegucigalpa
1985	Group stage	Canada	0–2	Victoria, Canada
1985	Group stage	Guatemala	0–1	Port-au-Prince, Haiti
1985	Group stage	Canada	0–2	Port-au-Prince, Haiti
1985	Group stage	Guatemala	0–4	Guatemala City, Guatemala
(United States) 2000	Group stage	United States	0–3	Miami
(United States) 2000	Group stage	Peru	1–1	Miami
(United States) 2002	Group stage	Canada	0–2	Miami
(United States) 2002	Group stage	Ecuador	2–0	Miami
(United States) 2002	Quarter-finals	Costa Rica	1–2 (a.s.d.e.t.)	Miami
(United States) 2007	Group stage	Guadeloupe	1–1	Miami
(United States) 2007	Group stage	Costa Rica	1–1	Miami
(United States) 2007	Group stage	Canada	0–2	Miami
(United States) 2009	Group stage	Honduras	0–1	Seattle
(United States) 2009	Group stage	Grenada	2–0	Washington, D.C.
(United States) 2009	Group stage	United States	2–2	Foxborough
(United States) 2009	Quarter-finals	Mexico	0–4	Arlington
(United States) 2013	Group stage	Honduras	0–2	Harrison
(United States) 2013	Group stage	Trinidad and Tobago	2–0	Miami Gardens
(United States) 2013	Group stage	El Salvador	0–1	Houston
(United States) (Canada) 2015	Group stage	Panama	1–1	Frisco
(United States) (Canada) 2015	Group stage	United States	0–1	Foxborough
(United States) (Canada) 2015	Group stage	Honduras	1–0	Kansas City
(United States) (Canada) 2015	Quarter-finals	Jamaica	0–1	Baltimore
(Costa Rica) (Jamaica) (United States) 2019	Group stage	Bermuda	2–1	San José, Costa Rica
(Costa Rica) (Jamaica) (United States) 2019	Group stage	Nicaragua	2–0	Frisco
(Costa Rica) (Jamaica) (United States) 2019	Group stage	Costa Rica	2–1	Harrison
(Costa Rica) (Jamaica) (United States) 2019	Quarter-finals	Canada	3–2	Houston
(Costa Rica) (Jamaica) (United States) 2019	Semi-finals	Mexico	0–1 (a.e.t.)	Glendale
(United States) 2021	Group stage	United States	0–1	Kansas City
(United States) 2021	Group stage	Canada	1–4	Kansas City
(United States) 2021	Group stage	Martinique	2–1	Frisco
(United States) (Canada) 2023	Group stage	Qatar	2–1	Houston
(United States) (Canada) 2023	Group stage	Mexico	1–3	Glendale
(United States) (Canada) 2023	Group stage	Honduras	1–2	Charlotte
(United States) (Canada) 2025	Group stage	Saudi Arabia	0–1	San Diego
(United States) (Canada) 2025	Group stage	Trinidad and Tobago	1–1	Houston
(United States) (Canada) 2025	Group stage	United States	1–2	Arlington

== 1973 CONCACAF Championship ==
1973 was the first of five times where the tournament was played as the final round of the CONCACAF World Cup qualifiers. It was also the first time this round was played as a "Hexagonal" – six times playing each other in a round-robin. This format has established itself in CONCACAF World Cup qualifiers since then.

The Haitian home tournament was held from 29 November to 18 December 1973. The title holders and favorites from Mexico started off with two draws, against Guatemala and Honduras, and only won their third match against the Netherlands Antilles. Haiti on the other hand kept winning and after their fourth consecutive victory, a 2–1 win over Guatemala with two goals by Emmanuel Sanon, the tournament standings were as follows:

Ranking as of 13 December 1973
Rank	Team	Pld	GF	GA	Pts
1	Haiti	4	8	2	8
2	Mexico	3	9	1	4
3	Honduras	4	5	5	4
4	Trinidad and Tobago	3	3	4	2
5	Guatemala	4	3	5	2
6	Netherlands Antilles	4	3	14	2

With Mexico being a match and four points down, they would have had to win their next match, and then defeat Haiti in an all-or-nothing final on the last day. However, Mexico surprisingly lost 0–4 to Trinidad and Tobago, Mexico's highest defeat ever at a continental championship, and Haiti was certain to win the tournament and qualify for the 1974 FIFA World Cup.

Haiti lost their final match 0–1 to Mexico, with the end table as follows:

Final ranking
Rank	Team	Pld	GF	GA	Pts
1	Haiti	5	8	3	8
2	Trinidad and Tobago	5	11	4	6
3	Mexico	5	10	5	6
4	Honduras	5	6	6	5
5	Guatemala	5	4	6	3
6	Netherlands Antilles	5	3	18	2

== See also ==
- Haiti at the Copa América
- Haiti at the FIFA World Cup
