= Moncef Chargui =

Tunisian footballer

Personal information
- Date of birth: 7 August 1958 (age 68)
- Place of birth: Tunisia
- Position: Defender

Senior career*
Years	Team	Apps	(Gls)
- Club Africain

International career
1981–1986	Tunisia		

Managerial career
- 2003: Club Africain
- EOG Kram
- Jendouba Sport
- Al-Shabab
- 2007: ES Zarzis
- * Club domestic league appearances and goals

Moncef Chargui (born 7 August 1958) is a former Tunisia international football defender who played club football in Tunisia. He is a football manager and has led clubs in Tunisia and Bahrain.

== Club career ==
Born in Tunisia, Chargui played football in the national league for Club Africain.

== Career as manager ==
After retiring from playing football, Chargui became a manager. He led Club Africain, Etoile Olympique de la Goulette et Kram and Jendouba Sport in the local league before joining Bahraini side Al-Shabab. In 2003, he was appointed to replace former Club Africain manager Muhsin Ertuğral, leading the club to the semi-finals of the 2003 CAF Cup. He joined Espérance Sportive de Zarzis in 2007.

== International career ==
Chargui made several appearances for the Tunisia national football team, including one FIFA World Cup qualifying match. He also played for Tunisia at the 1977 FIFA World Youth Championship finals in Tunisia.
