= Taoufik Ben Othman =

Tunisian football player and coach

Personal information
- Date of birth: 24 March 1939 (age 87)
- Place of birth: Tunisia

Senior career*
Years	Team	Apps	(Gls)
- AS Marsa

International career
- Tunisia

Managerial career
- 1966–1967: AS La Marsa
- 1970–1971: AS La Marsa
- 1971–1972: ES Hammam-Sousse
- 1973–1974: Olympique Béja
- 1975–1977: AS La Marsa
- 1978: AS La Marsa
- 1979–1980: AS La Marsa
- 1980–1981: CA Bizertin
- 1982–1983: AS La Marsa
- 1987–1988: Tunisia
- 1988–1989: AS La Marsa
- 1993: CO Transports
- 1994–1995: AS La Marsa
- 1995–1996: ES Zarzis
- 1996: Olympique Béja
- 1997: ES Hammam-Sousse
- 1999: AS Kasserine
- 2001: AS La Marsa
- 2006: AS La Marsa
- * Club domestic league appearances and goals

Taoufik Ben Othman (Arabic: تَوْفِيق بْن عُثْمَان, born 24 March 1939) is a Tunisian football player and coach.

He began his career very young at the Avenir Sportif de La Marsa and joined the junior individual selections. In 1958–1959 he participated in the first promotion of his club among the elite and is still there to help win the cups and the lead if necessary. He holds a total of 55 international caps, and represented his country in the 1960 Summer Olympics.

Having coached several clubs, including Avenir Sportif de La Marsa and CA Bizerte, he was appointed assistant coach by Abdelmajid Chetali and contributes to the qualification of Tunisia to the World Cup 1978. He was named coach of the Tunisia national football team in 1987.
