= Patrice Neveu =

French football coach (born 1954)

Personal information
- Date of birth: 29 March 1954 (age 72)
- Place of birth: Pré-Saint-Évroult, France
- Position: Defender

Team information
- Current team: Togo (manager)

Senior career*
Years	Team	Apps	(Gls)
- Angoulême CFC
- ES La Rochelle

Managerial career
- 1991–1998: Vendée Fontenay Foot
- 1998–1999: Angoulême CFC
- 1999: Niger
- 1999–2001: CO Médenine
- 2003: Zhuhai Anping
- 2004–2006: Guinea
- 2007: Ismaily
- 2008–2010: DR Congo
- 2010: Smouha
- 2012–2014: Mauritania
- 2015–2016: Haiti
- 2018: Laos
- 2018–2019: Horoya AC
- 2019–2023: Gabon
- 2026-: Togo
- * Club domestic league appearances and goals

Patrice Neveu (born 29 March 1954) is a French football coach and former player, who is manager of Togo national team.

== Playing career ==
Neveu enjoyed a short playing career in France with Angoulême CFC and ES La Rochelle.

== Coaching career ==
After retiring as a player, Neveu has managed both club and national sides. He began his career in France with club sides Vendée Fontenay Foot and Angoulême CFC, before becoming manager of the Niger national side in 1999. He then returned to club football in Tunisia with CO Médenine in 1999. In December 2001, Neveu came to Chinese club Dalian Shide and served as coach of its youth academy where he was mainly in charge of a youth team made up of foreign teenage players signed from Cameroon, a project which later proved a failure. In December 2002, Neveu was appointed manager of Dalian Sidelong, which was then Dalian Shide's reserve team and was competing in the second-tier league. Soon later in January 2003, Dalian Sidelong was sold out, moved to the city of Zhuhai and renamed Zhuhai Anping, in an effort to remove its affiliation with Dalian Shide, as is required by the Chinese Football Association. Neveu nevertheless maintained his managerial position at the new club, and went on to lead the team to finish the season in 8th position, before he left the club at the end of the year. In 2004, Neveu returned to international level with the Guinea national side, that he managed from 2004 to 2006. He then managed Ismaily in Egypt from February to August 2007. He became manager of the DR Congo national side in April 2008. Neveu rejected calls in October 2008 from player Shabani Nonda for him to resign following some poor performances by the national side.

In October 2008, Neveu was named among a five-man shortlist for the vacant job as the manager of the Rwandan national side.

On 9 August 2014, Naveu left his position of manager of Mauritanian national side.

He became the coach of the Haiti national team in December 2015, leaving the role in December 2016.

In December 2017 he was linked with the vacant Benin national team manager's job.

In April 2018 he was one of 77 applicants for the vacant Cameroon national team job.

In September 2018, he temporarily became the manager of Laos, before being replaced by Singaporean coach V. Sundramoorthy. In November 2018 he became manager of Horoya AC. He was replaced with Didier Gomes on 20 March 2019.

On 24 March 2019, he was then appointed as manager of Gabon's national team. He left the role in late 2023.

He became Togo manager in February 2026.
