= Habib Majeri =

Tunisian footballer

Personal information
- Date of birth: 14 December 1951 (age 74)
- Place of birth: Tunisia

Senior career*
Years	Team	Apps	(Gls)
1968–1973	CS Hammam-Lif		
1973–1977	R. Crossing de Molenbeek		
1977–1979	Club Africain		
1979–1982	Ohod Club		
1982–1983	CS Hammam-Lif		

International career
1978	Tunisia	15	(0)

Managerial career
- 2010: AS Marsa
- 2012: CS Hammam-Lif
- 2013: EGS Gafsa
- 2014: EGS Gafsa
- 2021-2022: CS Hammam-Lif
- * Club domestic league appearances and goals

Habib Majeri or Habib Mejri is a Tunisian football player who played for Tunisia in the 1978 African Cup of Nations.

He later became a manager.
