= Othman Chehaibi =

Tunisian football forward

Ohman Chehaibi
Personal information
- Date of birth: 23 December 1954 (age 71)
- Place of birth: Tunisia
- Position: Forward

Senior career*
| Years | Team | Apps | (Gls) |
- Jeunesse Sportive Kairouanaise

International career
- Tunisia
- * Club domestic league appearances and goals

Othman Chehaibi (born 23 December 1954) is a Tunisian football forward who played for Jeunesse Sportive Kairouanaise and the Tunisia national team. He was part of the Tunisian squad that participated in the 1978 FIFA World Cup.
