= Khaled Ben Sassi =

Tunisian football manager

Personal information
- Date of birth: 31 March 1962 (age 64)
- Place of birth: Béjà, Tunisia
- Position: Forward

Senior career*
Years	Team	Apps	(Gls)
1986–1987	US Canet		
1987–1993	Canet Roussillon FC		
1993–1994	ES Sahel		

Managerial career
- 2009: AS Kasserine
- 2009: ES Sahel
- 2011: EGS Gafsa
- 2011–2012: ES Sahel
- 2012: Stade Tunisien
- 2013: Sfax Railways
- 2014: LPS Tozeur
- 2015: US Monastir
- 2016–2017: AS Marsa
- 2018: US Ben Guerdane
- 2019: AS Gabès
- 2021-2022: EM Mahdia
- 2022: ES Hammam Sousse
- 2022: JS Kairouan
- 2023: CS Msaken
- 2024: ES Sahel
- * Club domestic league appearances and goals

Khaled Ben Sassi (born 31 March 1962) is a Tunisian football manager and former player who played as a forward.
