= Al-Kawkab FC =

Association football club in Saudi Arabia

- Full name: Al-Kawkab Football Club
- Nickname: Fakhar Al-Kharj (Pride of Al-Kharj)
- Founded: 1968; 58 years ago
- Ground: Al-Shoulla Club Stadium
- Capacity: 8,000
- Chairman: Dabbas Al-Dossari
- Manager: Saber Abdellaoui
- League: Saudi Second Division League
- 2024–25: Saudi Second Division League, 8th of 16 Group A

Al-Kawkab Football Club (Arabic: نادي الكوكب) is a Saudi Arabian professional football club based in Al-Kharj that plays in the Saudi Second Division League, the third tier of Saudi football.

Al-Kawkab have won Saudi First Division once and finished runners-up once. They have competed in the Saudi Pro League twice and have been relegated in each season. Al-Kawkab have won the Second Division once and finished runners-up once as well. The club last competed in the Professional League in the 1987–88 season when they were relegated to the First Division.

The club play their home games at Al-Shoulla Club Stadium in Al-Kharj, sharing the stadium with city rivals Al-Shoulla, with whom they contest the Al-Kharj derby.

== Honours ==
- Saudi First Division League
  - Winners (1): 1986–87
  - Runners-up (1): 1984–85
- Saudi Second Division League
  - Winners (3): 1978–79, 2004–05, 2016–17

== Current squad ==
Note: Flags indicate national team as defined under FIFA eligibility rules; some limited exceptions apply. Players may hold more than one non-FIFA nationality.

No.	Pos.	Nation	Player
1	GK	KSA	Amer Al-Sowayegh
2	DF	KSA	Muhannad Al-Harbi
3	DF	TUN	Houssem Chebli
4	DF	KSA	Hassan Al-Shamrani
5	DF	KSA	Ali Al-Thunayan
6	DF	KSA	Abdulrahman Al-Rabee
7	MF	KSA	Mohammed Al-Wotaidi
8	MF	KSA	Waleed Al-Enezi
10	MF	BRA	Téssio
11	MF	KSA	Abdulaziz Al-Aliwah
14	MF	KSA	Nasser Sabahi
18	MF	KSA	Ibrahim Al-Muatish
19	MF	KSA	Ahmed Al-Ghamdi
20	DF	KSA	Munaif Al-Enezi

No.	Pos.	Nation	Player
21	DF	KSA	Fares Al-Sharari
23	GK	KSA	Abdullah Al-Obaid
27	MF	KSA	Abdoh Sufyani
33	GK	KSA	Rashed Al-Mutarrad
38	MF	KSA	Turki Al-Farhan
45	FW	NGR	Francis Chima
46	MF	KSA	Khalid Al-Ghwinem
47	DF	KSA	Abdulmajeed Al Abbas
80	MF	KSA	Yahya Awaji
88	FW	KSA	Wael Kaabi
94	DF	KSA	Abdullah Al-Sharmi
99	FW	CIV	Guillaume Daho
—	DF	KSA	Asaed Al-Dohailan

== Managerial history ==
- (Saudi Arabia) Fahad Al-Yaeesh (1967 – 1971)
- (Egypt) Ibrahim El-Esawi (1975 – 1977)
- (Egypt) Mahmoud El-Sayes (1978 – 1979)
- (Egypt) Farouk El-Sayed (1979 – 1980)
- (Egypt) Mahmoud El-Sayes (1982 – 1983)
- (Tunisia) Omar El Nahal (1983 – 1984)
- (Tunisia) Mokhtar Tlili (1984 – 1985)
- (Netherlands) Ger Blok (1985 – 1986)
- (Saudi Arabia) Nasser Al-Olaiwi (1986 – 1987)
- (Saudi Arabia) Nasser Al-Olaiwi (1990 – 1991)
- (Egypt) Farouk El-Sayed (1991 – 1992)
- (Saudi Arabia) Nasser Al-Olaiwi (1994 – 1995)
- (Saudi Arabia) Khaled Al-Jasser (1995 – 1996)
- (Algeria) Boualem Laroum (1996 – 1997)
- (Algeria) Tayeb Enani (1999 – 2000)
- (Tunisia) Mahmoud Lajdidi (1999 – 2000)
- (Saudi Arabia) Saad Al-Subeai (2004 – 2005)
- (Saudi Arabia) Khaled Al-Farhan (2005)
- (Saudi Arabia) Sami Farhan (2005 – 2006)
- (Saudi Arabia) Khaled Al-Farhan (2006 – 2007)
- (Tunisia) Mabrook Al-Kilani (2009 – 2010)
- (Tunisia) Selim Al Manga (July 23, 2011 – April 12, 2012)
- (Saudi Arabia) Sultan Khamis (June 11, 2012 – October 4, 2013)
- (Tunisia) Chaker Meftah (October 10, 2013 – January 19, 2014)
- (Saudi Arabia) Ibrahim Al-Mutaiwee (January 20, 2014 – February 15, 2014)
- (Tunisia) Hassine Menestiri (February 15, 2014 – May 1, 2014)
- (Tunisia) Moncef Mcharek (June 18, 2014 – September 27, 2018)
- (Egypt) Osama Nabieh (October 4, 2018 – April 3, 2019)
- (Tunisia) Moncef Mcharek (April 5, 2019 – May 1, 2020)
- (Tunisia) Jameel Qassem (June 15, 2020 – September 14, 2020)
- (Tunisia) Kamel Zaiem (September 22, 2020 – December 8, 2020)
- (Tunisia) Mohammed Aldo (December 9, 2020 – May 3, 2021)
- (Tunisia) Ramzi Kerid (May 3, 2021 – May 31, 2021)
- (Tunisia) Yamen Zelfani (June 26, 2021 – February 16, 2022)
- (Spain) Juan José Maqueda (February 18, 2022 – April 2, 2022)
- (Tunisia) Saber Abdellaoui (April 6, 2022 – May 16, 2022)
- (Saudi Arabia) Abdullah Al-Otaibi (caretaker) (May 16, 2022 – June 1, 2022)
- (Tunisia) Yousri bin Kahla (August 16, 2022 – September 23, 2022)
- (Tunisia) Ramzi Kerid (September 25, 2022 – December 22, 2022)
- (Tunisia) Maher Guizani (December 22, 2022 – May 1, 2023)
- (Saudi Arabia) Abdulaziz Al-Bishi (July 1, 2023 – September 8, 2023)
- (Tunisia) Mohammed Dahmane (September 8, 2023 – October 9, 2023)
- (Tunisia) Yamen Zelfani (October 12, 2023 – February 14, 2024)
- (Tunisia) Maher Guizani (August 1, 2024 – January 23, 2025)
- (Tunisia) Ameur Derbal (January 23, 2025 – January 27, 2025)
- (Saudi Arabia) Rashed Al-Wadaani (February 1, 2025 – )

== See also ==
- List of football clubs in Saudi Arabia
