= Nizar Khanfir =

Tunisian football manager

Managerial career
- Years: Team
- 2006: CS Hammam-Lif
- 2013–2014: Tunisia U23
- 2015: Tunisia Olympic
- 2015–2016: Stade Gabèsien
- 2016: APR F.C.
- 2016–2021: Al-Sailiya SC (assistant)
- 2021: CS Sfaxien (director of sports)

Nizar Khanfir is a Tunisian football manager.

Managing CS Hammam-Lif, he went on to work for the national federation as manager of Tunisia U23 and Tunisia Olympic. In December 2015 he was hired as manager of Tunisian Ligue Professionnelle 1 club Stade Gabèsien. On 19 February 2016, a crowd of displeased Stade Gabèsien fans gathered at the training ground and interrupted the session. Khanfir subsequently left the club. He instead joined Rwandan club APR F.C. ahead of their 2016 CAF Champions League qualifying game against Yanga. Following a longer stint at Qatari team Al-Sailiya SC, he was hired as director of sports at CS Sfaxien in March 2021.
