= Kamel Chebli =

Tunisian footballer

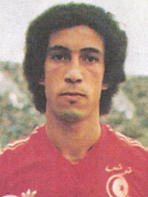
- Chebli in 1978

Personal information
- Date of birth: 9 March 1954 (age 72)
- Place of birth: Tunis, Tunisia
- Height: 1.88 m (6 ft 2 in)
- Position: Defender

Senior career*
| Years | Team | Apps | (Gls) |
| 1974–1987 | Club Africain | | |

International career
| 1976–1985 | Tunisia | | |

Managerial career
- 2010: AS Marsa
- * Club domestic league appearances and goals

Kamel Chebli (born 9 March 1954) is a Tunisian football defender who played for Club Africain and the Tunisia national team. He was part of the Tunisian squad that played in the 1978 FIFA World Cup.
