= Serge Devèze =

French football manager

Personal information
- Date of birth: 25 September 1956
- Date of death: 17 December 2015 (aged 59)

Managerial career
- Years: Team
- 1992–1993: Guinea
- 1997–1998: Gabon
- 2005: Benin
- 2010–2011: Fujairah

Serge Devèze (25 September 1956 – 17 December 2015) was a French association football manager, active primarily in Africa with the national teams of Guinea, Gabon and Benin. He died on 17 December 2015.
