= CS Korba =

Tunisian football club

- Full name: Club Sportif de Korba
- Founded: 1960
- Ground: Korba Municipal Stadium
- Capacity: 6,000
- League: Ligue 2
- 2023–24: Ligue 2, Group A, 3rd of 14
Home colours	Away colours

Club Sportif de Korba (Arabic: النادي الرياضي القربي), known as CS Korba or simply CSK for short, is a Tunisian football club based in Korba. The club was founded in 1960 and its colours are green and yellow. Their home stadium, Korba Municipal Stadium, has a capacity of 6,000 spectators. The club is currently playing in the Tunisian Ligue Professionnelle 2.

== Honours ==
- Tunisian League 2: 1

1981/82
