= AS Marsa =

Tunisian football club

- Full name: Avenir Sportif de La Marsa
- Nickname: Gnaweya (The Okras)
- Founded: 22 February 1939
- Ground: Abdelaziz Chtioui Stadium
- Capacity: 6,500
- Chairman: Moez Gharbi
- Manager: Imed Ben Younes
- League: Ligue 1
- 2025–26: Ligue 1, 10th
Home colours	Away colours	Third colours

Avenir Sportif de La Marsa (Arabic: المستقبل الرياضي بالمرسى), commonly known as AS Marsa or simply ASM, is a Tunisian professional football club based in La Marsa, Tunis. Founded in 1939 as Club Musulman, the club traditionally plays in green and yellow. Its home ground is the Abdelaziz Chtioui Stadium, which has a capacity of 6,500 spectators.

As of the 2025–26 season, AS Marsa competes in the Tunisian Ligue Professionnelle 1, the top tier of Tunisian football, following its promotion from Ligue 2 in 2025.

== Players ==
=== Current squad ===
As of 15 September 2026

Note: Flags indicate national team as defined under FIFA eligibility rules; some limited exceptions apply. Players may hold more than one non-FIFA nationality.

No.	Pos.	Nation	Player
1	GK	TUN	Mohamed Ben Braiek
2	DF	TUN	Mohamed Chaouch
3	DF	MAR	Soufiane Mestari
4	DF	TUN	Abbas Abdul Wadud
5	DF	TUN	Oussama Bahri
6	MF	TUN	Kouni Khalfa
7	FW	TUN	Firas Iffia
8	MF	TUN	Abdelkader Gasmi
9	MF	TUN	Haroun Ayari
10	FW	TUN	Mohamed Hamrouni
11	MF	TUN	Amor Traidi
12	DF	TUN	Yassine Boukhris
13	MF	TUN	Mohamed Aziz Traidi
14	DF	TUN	Mohamed Hedi Moslem
15	MF	CIV	Ricky Gneba
16	GK	TUN	Hamza Ben Cherifia

No.	Pos.	Nation	Player
17	DF	TUN	Oussama Jebali
18	FW	TUN	Nour Mani
19	FW	TUN	Yassine Zouari
20	MF	TUN	Rayane Ben Chrouda
21	MF	NGR	Ojonugwa Adejoh
22	DF	TUN	Fares Meskini
23	GK	TUN	Sami Helal
24	FW	TUN	Malek Attia
25	FW	CIV	Youssouf Dao
26	FW	ANG	Victorino Polaco
27	MF	TUN	Mohamed Khaloui
28	FW	TUN	Amanallah Ben Hamida
29	MF	TUN	Fares Neji
34	DF	TUN	Mohamed Amine Kechiche

Notes: Shirt numbers are partial and may vary; positions/nationalities based on club profiles.

== Achievements ==
=== Domestic Competitions ===
Competition	Titles	Winning / Runner-up Seasons
Tunisian Cup	5	Winners: 1961, 1977, 1984, 1990, 1994 Runners-up: 1965, 1966, 1970, 1973, 1983, 1987, 1993, 2013, 2022
Tunisian League Cup	1	Winners: 2007
Coupe Hédi Chaker	–	Runners-up: 1961

=== International Competitions ===
Competition	Appearances	Best Performance / Notes
CAF Confederation Cup	1	2005 – Group stage (Top 8)
CAF Cup Winners' Cup	3	1985 – First round 1991 – Second round 1995 – Withdrew in Quarter-finals
Arab Cup Winners' Cup	2	1992 – Semi-finals 1994 – Semi-finals
Maghreb Cup Winners Cup	–	Runners-up: 1971

== Managers ==
Managers of La Marsa throughout history (most recent first)
Country	Manager	Years
(Tunisia)	Ameur Derbal	2025–present
(Tunisia)	Mounir Rached	2024–2025
(Tunisia)	Abdelkarim Bouguerra	2024
(Tunisia)	Souhaieb Zarrouk	2024
(Algeria)	Chaker Meftah	2024
(Tunisia)	Abdessattar Ben Moussa	2023
(Tunisia)	Khaled Ben Yahia	2023
(Tunisia)	Lotfi Kadri	2022–2023
(Tunisia)	Sofiène Hidoussi	2022
(Tunisia)	Abdelkarim Bouguerra	2021–2022
(Tunisia)	Hakim Aoun	2020
(Tunisia)	Samir Sellimi	2019–2020
(Algeria)	Karim Dalhoum	2019
(Tunisia)	Lotfi Kadri	2018–2019
(Tunisia)	Lotfi Sebti	2017–2018
(Tunisia)	Kamel Kolsi	2017
(Tunisia)	Tarek Thabet	2017–2018
(Tunisia)	Khaled Ben Sassi	2016–2017
(Tunisia)	Abdelkarim Bouguerra	2016
(France)	Gérard Buscher	2016
(Tunisia)	Mondher Kebaier	2014–2016
(Tunisia)	Adel Sellimi	2013–2014
(Serbia)	Dragan Cvetković	2013
(France)	Gérard Buscher	2010–2013
(Tunisia)	Habib Mejri	2010
(Tunisia)	Kamel Chebli	2009–2010
(Tunisia)	Khaled Ben Yahia	2008–2009
(Algeria)	Abdelkrim Bira	2008–2009
(Tunisia)	Mrad Mahjoub	2008
(Tunisia)	Kais Yaacoubi	2007–2008
(Tunisia)	Habib Mejri	2006–2007
(Tunisia)	Taoufik Ben Othman	2005–2006
(Tunisia)	Ali Selmi	2003–2006
(Tunisia)	Habib Mejri	2001–2003
(Tunisia)	Taoufik Ben Othman	2000–2001
(Tunisia)	Baccar Ben Miled	2000–2001
(France)	Serge Devèze	1999–2001
(Monaco)	Armand Forcherio	1999–2000
(Tunisia)	Faouzi Merzouki	1999–2000
(Algeria)	Ali Fergani	1998–1999
(Tunisia)	Khaled Ben Yahia	1998–1999
(Poland)	Kousteck	1997–1998
(Tunisia)	Habib Mejri	1995–1997
(Tunisia)	Taoufik Ben Othman	1994–1995
(Tunisia)	Ali Selmi	1993–1994
(Algeria)	Rachid Mekhloufi	1992–1993
(Tunisia)	Ali Selmi	1991–1992
(Bulgaria)	Aleksandar Kostov	1989–1991
(Tunisia)	Taoufik Ben Othman	1988–1989
(Bulgaria)	Aleksandar Kostov	1987–1988
(Tunisia)	Hédi Kouni	1986–1987
(Serbia)	Dragan Gugleta	1985–1987
(France)	Jean-Claude Larrieu	1984–1985
(Tunisia)	Ali Selmi	1983–1985
(Tunisia)	Taoufik Ben Othman	1982–1983
(Algeria)	Rachid Mekhloufi	1981–1982
(Algeria)	Abdelhamid Kermali	1980–1981
(Tunisia)	Taoufik Ben Othman	1979–1980
(Tunisia)	Ali Selmi	1978–1979
(Tunisia)	Taoufik Ben Othman	1977–1978
(Tunisia)	Baccar Ben Miled	1977–1978
(Tunisia)	Taoufik Ben Othman	1975–1977
(Tunisia)	Ali Selmi	1973–1975
(Algeria)	Omar Gadhoum	1972–1974
(Algeria)	Ahmed Benelfoul	1971–1972
(Tunisia)	Taoufik Ben Othman	1969–1971
(Socialist Federal Republic of Yugoslavia)	Stanislav Stanković	1968–1970
(Tunisia)	Skander Medelgi	1967–1968
(Tunisia)	Taoufik Ben Othman	1966–1967
(Tunisia)	Béji Bouachir	1966–1967
(Tunisia)	Hmid Dhib	1965–1966
(Hungary)	Sandor Pazmandy	1960–1965
(Tunisia)	Rachid Turki	1959–1960

== Presidents ==
Presidents throughout history (most recent first)
Country	President	Term
(Tunisia)	Moez Gharbi	2025–present
(Tunisia)	Taoufik Ben Ncib	2017–2025
(Tunisia)	Maher Ben Aïssa	2011–2017
(Tunisia)	Hammouda Louzir	2011
(Tunisia)	Montassar Meherzi	2008–2010
(Tunisia)	Mondher Mami	2006–2008
(Tunisia)	Brahim Riahi	2001–2006
(Tunisia)	Mahmoud Azzouz	1999–2001
(Tunisia)	Manef Mellouli	1998–1999
(Tunisia)	Jalel Gherab	1996–1998
(Tunisia)	Khaled Bach Hamba	1994–1996
(Tunisia)	Mahmoud Azzouz	1992–1994
(Tunisia)	Tijani Meddeb	1990–1992
(Tunisia)	Hammouda Belkhouja	1988–1990
(Tunisia)	Abderrahman Oueslati	1985–1988
(Tunisia)	Mondher Ben Ammar	1982–1985
(Tunisia)	Hammouda Belkhouja	1980–1982
(Tunisia)	Mondher Ben Ammar	1979–1980
(Tunisia)	Hédi Mehrezi	1978–1979
(Tunisia)	Abdellatif Dahmani	1977–1978
(Tunisia)	Mondher Ben Ammar	1972–1977
(Tunisia)	Ali Bouzaiane	1971–1972
(Tunisia)	Abdellatif Dahmani	1968–1971
(Tunisia)	Chedly Hassouna	1966–1968
(Tunisia)	Ali Kallel	1965–1966
(Tunisia)	Slim Tlili	1964
(Tunisia)	Chedly Hassouna	1959–1964
(Tunisia)	Béji Mestiri	1957–1959
(Tunisia)	Belhassen Aouij	1956–1957
(Tunisia)	Othman Ben Othman	1955–1956
(Tunisia)	M'hammed Zaouchi	1939–1955

== See also ==
- AS Marsa (volleyball)
- AS Marsa Women's Volleyball
