= CA Bizertin =

Association football club in Tunisia

Club Bizertin
- Full name: Club Athlétique Bizertin
- Nicknames: Les Requins du Nord (The Northern Sharks) Giallonerra(The Yellow And Black) The key of Africa فاتح أفريقيا
- Short name: CAB
- Founded: July 12, 1928; 98 years ago
- Ground: 15 October Stadium
- Capacity: 20,000
- President: Mohamed Riadh Mokdad
- Manager: Mohamed Azaiez
- League: Tunisian Ligue Professionnelle 1
- 2025–26: Ligue 1, 12th of 16
- Website: http://www.cab-officiel.com/fr/
Home colours	Away colours	Third colours

Club Athlétique Bizertin (Arabic: النادي الرياضي البنزرتي), known as CA Bizertin or simply CAB for short, is a Tunisian professional football club based in Bizerte. The club was founded 1928 and its colours are yellow and black. Their home stadium, 15 October Stadium, has a capacity of 20,000 spectators. The club is currently playing in the Tunisian Ligue Professionnelle 1.

CA Bizertin is one of the biggest teams in Tunisia. They have won the Tunisian League four times, the Tunisian Cup three times, the Tunisian League Cup once and became the first Tunisian club to win an African trophy the African Cup Winners' Cup in 1988.

== Honours ==
Type	Competition	Titles	Winning Seasons
Domestic	Tunisian Ligue Professionnelle 1	4	1944–45, 1945–46, 1948–49, 1983–84
Domestic	Tunisian Cup	3	1981–82, 1986–87, 2012–13
Domestic	Tunisian League Cup	1	2003–04
Domestic	Tunisian Super Cup	1	1984
Domestic	Tunisian Ligue Professionnelle 2	1	1989–90
Continental	African Cup Winners' Cup	1	1988

=== Appearances in CAF Competitions ===
- CAF Champions League: 2 appearances

1985 – Second Round
2013 – Second Round

- CAF Cup: 2 appearances

1992 – Semi-finals
2000 – Second Round

- CAF Confederation Cup: 2 appearances

2013 – Semi-finals
2014 – Second Round

- African Cup Winners' Cup: 1 appearances

1989 – Second Round

== Current squad ==
As of 13 January 2025

Note: Flags indicate national team as defined under FIFA eligibility rules; some limited exceptions apply. Players may hold more than one non-FIFA nationality.

No.	Pos.	Nation	Player
1	GK	TUN	Kais Amdouni
4	DF	TUN	Rayane Rehimi
5	MF	TUN	Achref Ferchichi
6	DF	SEN	Abdou Seydi
7	FW	TUN	Khalil Balbouz
8	DF	TUN	Yasser Mechergui
9	MF	TUN	Rayan Mechergui
10	MF	SEN	Alassane Kante
11	FW	TUN	Ahmed Amri
12	FW	NGA	Favour Onyemaechi Adegbile
13	FW	ALG	Abderraouf Othmani
14	DF	TUN	Firas Akeremi
15	MF	SEN	Ibrahima Cissoko
17	MF	TUN	Iyed Midani
18	FW	SEN	Momar Diop

No.	Pos.	Nation	Player
19	FW	ALG	Youcef Fellahi
20	DF	TUN	Malek Doukali
21	MF	FRA	Firas Ben Othman
24	DF	TUN	Mohamed Allela
25	MF	TUN	Alaeddine Bouallegui
26	MF	NOR	Oussama Ali
27	GK	TUN	Achraf Krir
28	MF	TUN	Mohamed Sadok Jammali
29	FW	TUN	Zied Aloui
30	DF	TUN	Abdelmajid Haouachi
31	DF	TUN	Aziz Guesmi
33	MF	TUN	Aymen Amri
—	FW	NGA	Olamilekan Ayinde
—	MF	TUN	Othman Charfeddine

== Presidents ==
- Abdesslem Saidani (2016–)

== Notable coaches ==
- (Socialist Federal Republic of Yugoslavia) Radojica Radojičić (1979–80)
- (Tunisia) Taoufik Ben Othman (1980–81)
- (Socialist Federal Republic of Yugoslavia) Radojica Radojičić (1981–82)
- (Tunisia) Youssef Zouaoui (1982–84), (1986–87)
- (Poland) Ryszard Kulesza (1987–88)
- (Tunisia) Youssef Zouaoui (1988), (1989–92)
- (Romania) Alexandru Moldovan (1995–96)
- (Tunisia) Youssef Zouaoui (1997)
- (Brazil) Paulo Rubim (2001–02)
- (Tunisia) Mondher Kebaier (2002–03)
- (Algeria) Ali Fergani (2003–04)
- (Tunisia) Mahmoud Ouertani & (Brazil) Paulo Rubim (2004–05)
- (Tunisia) Nabil Maaloul, (Tunisia) Nejmeddine Oumaya & (Algeria) Ali Fergani (2005–06)
- (Tunisia) Nejmeddine Oumaya, (Brazil) Paulo Rubim & (Tunisia) Mokhtar Tlili (2006–07)
- (Tunisia) Ferid Ben Belgacem (July 1, 2007 – April 20, 2008)
- (Tunisia) Mokhtar Tlili (2008)
- (Tunisia) Larbi Zouaoui (Sept 17, 2008 – Aug 5, 2009)
- (France) Gérard Buscher (July 1, 2010 – Aug 25, 2010)
- (Tunisia) Youssef Zouaoui (Sept 4, 2010 – Jan 2, 2011)
- (Tunisia) Maher Kanzari (Jan 2, 2010 – Oct 4, 2012)
- (Algeria) Noureddine Saâdi (Oct 23, 2012 – March 12, 2013)
- (Tunisia) Mondher Kebaier (March 12, 2013 – Dec 30, 2013)
- (Tunisia) Maher Kanzari (Jan 1, 2014 – March 13, 2014)
- (Tunisia) Nabil Kouki (March 14, 2014 – June 7, 2014)
- (Serbia) Ratko Dostanić (July 1, 2014–15)
- (Tunisia) Sofiene Hidoussi (2015–)
