= CS Hammam-Lif =

Tunisian football club

- Full name: Club Sportif de Hammam-Lif
- Nickname: Hamhama
- Founded: 1944
- Ground: Bou Kornine Stadium
- Capacity: 15,000
- Chairman: Mongi Bhar
- Manager: Khaled Mouelhi
- League: Ligue 1
- 2025–26: Ligue 2, Group A, 2th of 14
Home colours	Away colours	Third colours

Club Sportif de Hammam-Lif (Arabic: النادي الرياضي لحمام الأنف) known as CS Hammam-Lif or simply CSHL for short, is a Tunisian football club based in Hammam-Lif. The club was founded in 1944 and its colours are green and white. Their home stadium, Bou Kornine Stadium, has a capacity of 15,000 spectators. The club is currently playing in the Tunisian Ligue Professionnelle 1.

== Honours ==
- Tunisian League
  - Winners (4): 1951^{1}, 1954^{1}, 1955^{1}, 1956
- Tunisian Cup
  - Winners (9): 1947^{1}, 1948^{1}, 1949^{1}, 1950^{1}, 1951^{1}, 1954^{1}, 1955^{1}, 1985, 2001
- Tunisian Super Cup
  - Winners (1): 1985

^{1}titles won prior to independence

=== Performance in CAF competitions ===
- CAF Cup Winners' Cup: 2 appearances

1986 – Semi-finals
2002 – Second Round

== Colors and badges ==
=== Crest and Logos ===
Recent logo used by the Tunisian media, adding the mount (Bou Kornine) of the city of Hammam-Lif.

Logo used until 2008.

Logo used until 2013.

Former logo.

== Players ==
=== Current squad ===
As of 27 September 2026 Note: Flags indicate national team as defined under FIFA eligibility rules; some limited exceptions apply. Players may hold more than one non-FIFA nationality.

No.	Pos.	Nation	Player
1	GK	TUN	Iheb Ben Mansour
2	DF	TUN	Aymen Abbassi
5	DF	TUN	Aziz Koudhai (on loan from Espérance)
6	MF	MLI	Namory Sangaré
7	FW	TUN	Ahmed Ben Tiba
8	MF	TUN	Obeidallah Meskini
9	FW	TUN	Mohamed Mejri
10	DF	TUN	Habib Ghrairi
—	FW	TUN	Rafik Kamergi
—	FW	TUN	Yassine Chamakhi
—	FW	TUN	Zied Ben Salem
12	DF	TUN	Haythem Mhamdi
13	DF	TUN	Aziz Boukeba
14	FW	GAM	Pa Omar Jobe

No.	Pos.	Nation	Player
15	DF	TUN	Chiheb Ben Fradj
17	DF	TUN	Wahib Serghin
23	DF	TUN	Firas Ben Ammar
22	GK	TUN	Montassar Khemir
24	FW	TUN	Hassen Manai
25	MF	TUN	Wael Barhoumi
26	DF	TUN	Bahaeddine Sellami
29	DF	TUN	Iheb Dridi
30	MF	TUN	Rabie Karouia
33	FW	TUN	Mohamed Yaakoubi
35	DF	TUN	Mohamed Ben Ali
38	MF	GUI	Aboubacar Bérété
40	GK	TUN	Moez Ben Cherifia
44	DF	TUN	Mohamed Soltana

== Managers ==
- (England) Bill Berry (July 1, 1955 – June 30, 1956)
- (France) Louis Pinat (1963–65)
- (France) Edmond Delfour (1965–69)
- (Czechoslovakia) Ludwig Dupal (1969–70)
- (Tunisia) Jamel Eddine Bouabsa (1974–76)
- (Tunisia) Mokhtar Tlili (1976–78)
- (Tunisia) Jamel Eddine Bouabsa (1981–82)
- (Hungary) André Nagy (1986–87)
- (Tunisia) Ahmed Dhib (1990–91)
- (Tunisia) Habib Mejri (1991–93), (1994–95)
- (Tunisia) Ammar Souayah (1999–01)
- (Tunisia) Khaled Hosni & (Tunisia) Nizar Khanfir (2004–05)
- (Tunisia) Habib Mejri (2005–06)
- (Tunisia) Khemais Labidi, (Tunisia) Nizar Khanfir & (Tunisia) Ridha Akacha (2006–07)
- (Tunisia) Ridha Akacha & (Tunisia) Habib Mejri (2007–08)
- (Tunisia) Ridha Akacha & (Tunisia) Fethi Laabidi (Nov 19, 2008 – Nov 1, 2009)
- (France) Gérard Buscher (Nov 1, 2009 – June 30, 2010)
- (Serbia) Dragan Cvetković (July 1, 2010 – Aug 15, 2011)
- (Tunisia) Nabil Tasco (Sept 13, 2011 – Dec 25, 2011)
- (France) Christian Sarramagna (Dec 28, 2011 – June 20, 2012)
- (Tunisia) Fethi Laabidi (June 21, 2012 – Aug 27, 2012)
- (Tunisia) Habib Mejri (Sept 28, 2012 – Nov 19, 2012)
- (Serbia) Dragan Cvetković (Nov 20, 2012 – June 30, 2013)
- (Tunisia) Ferid Ben Belgacem (July 1, 2013 – Dec 1, 2013)
- (Tunisia) Noureddine Bousnina (Dec 2, 2013 – Dec 22, 2013)
- (Tunisia) Fethi Laabidi (Feb 25, 2014 – March 23, 2012)
- (France) Gérard Buscher (March 24, 2014 – 2016)
- (Tunisia) esebti (Juilet, 2016–2017)
- (Tunisia) Maher Guizani ( 2017–2018)
- (France) Gérard Buscher (2018)

== Presidents ==
- Sadok Boussofara (1944–45)
- Hammadi Abdessamad (1945–48)
- Kheireddine Azzouz (1949–56)
- Sadok Boussofara (1956–87)
- Abderrazak Oueslati (1987–90)
- Naceur Boufares (1990–95)
- Moncef Ben Mrad (1995–96)
- Maâouia Kaabi (1996–99)
- Abderrazak Oueslati (1999–01)
- Hamadi Atrous (2001–04)
- Maâouia Kaabi (2004–05)
- Adel Kitar (2005–06)
- Mongi Bhar (2006–11)
- Adel Daadaa (2011–2016)
- Fadhel ben hamza (2016–2021)
- Adel Daadaa (2021)
- Maouia Kaabi (2021–2022)
- Faycal Boucetta (2022–2024)
- Monji Bhar (2024– Now)
