= Stade Tunisien =

Tunisian association football club

- Full name: Stade Tunisien
- Nicknames: Baklawa; The Bey Team
- Short name: ST
- Founded: 7 July 1948; 78 years ago
- Stadium: Hédi-Enneifer Stadium
- Capacity: 12,000
- Chairman: Mohamed Mahjoub
- Manager: Tozé Marreco
- League: Tunisian Ligue Professionnelle 1
- 2025–26: Ligue 1, 4th of 16
- Website: stadetunisien.tn
Home colours	Away colours	Third colours

Stade Tunisien (French pronunciation: [stad tynizjɛ̃]; Arabic: الملعب التونسي), abbreviated as ST, is a football club based in Le Bardo, a western suburb of Tunis (formerly the residence of the Beylical patronage). It is considered one of the top teams in the Tunis region, alongside Espérance Sportive de Tunis and Club Africain.

== History ==
Founded on July 7, 1948, the club is the successor of the football section of the now-defunct Association of Young Muslims of Bardo, which was established in 1923. The club has historical ties to the Beylical patronage, particularly from Lamine Bey, which is reflected in its nickname "club beylical."

Stade Tunisien competes in the Tunisian football league. The club has won a total of 18 titles: 15 at the national level (four championships, seven cups, one supercup, two League Cups, and two Hédi Chaker Cups), and two at the regional level (two Arab Cup Winners' Cups).

After a continuous 61-year presence in the top tier of Tunisian football, the club was relegated to Ligue II at the end of the 2015–16 season. However, it quickly returned to Ligue I, making history as the first Tunisian team to have won both Ligue I and Ligue II championships.

A rivalry exists with the two other major clubs in Tunis, Espérance Sportive de Tunis and Club Africain, with whom Stade Tunisien contests the "Petit Derby" of Tunis.

== Honours ==
Type	Competition	Titles	Winning Seasons
National	Tunisian Ligue Professionnelle 1	4	1956–57, 1960–61, 1961–62, 1964–65
National	Tunisian Cup	7	1955–56, 1957–58, 1959–60, 1961–62, 1965–66, 2002–03, 2023–24
National	Tunisian League Cup	2	1999–2000, 2001–02
National	Tunisian Super Cup	1	1966
National	Tunisian Ligue Professionnelle 2	2	2016–17, 2021–22
African	CAF Champions League	0	
African	CAF Confederation Cup	0	
Regional	Arab Cup Winners' Cup	2	1989, 2001

== Players ==
=== Current squad ===
As of 15 September, 2026

Note: Flags indicate national team as defined under FIFA eligibility rules; some limited exceptions apply. Players may hold more than one non-FIFA nationality.

No.	Pos.	Nation	Player
1	GK	TUN	Mehdi Ben Mrad
3	DF	TUN	Aziz Saihi
4	DF	TUN	Chamseddine Jrid
5	DF	TUN	Mounir Jelassi
6	MF	SEN	Papa Diop
7	DF	TUN	Wael Ouerghemmi
8	MF	TUN	Youssef Saafi
9	FW	SEN	Amadou Dia N'Diaye
10	MF	TUN	Zakaria El Ayeb
11	FW	TUN	Fakhreddine Ben Youssef
12	MF	BFA	Salifou Tapsoba
13	MF	TUN	Moncef Gharbi
14	MF	SEN	Boubacar Camara
16	GK	TUN	Atef Dkhili
17	FW	TUN	Abderrahman Hanchi

No.	Pos.	Nation	Player
18	MF	TUN	Mohamed Amine Khemissi
19	FW	TUN	Amine Haboubi
20	MF	TUN	Baraket Hmidi
21	MF	CIV	Yusuf Touré
22	GK	TUN	Noureddine Farhati
24	DF	FRA	Rayed Derbali
25	DF	TUN	Skander Sghaier
27	DF	TUN	Hedi Khalfa
28	FW	TUN	Malek Chouikh
29	FW	TUN	Youssef Dhaflaoui
30	FW	TUN	Riad Ouafi
34	MF	SEN	Mame Thioune
35	DF	TUN	Hassine Refai
—	MF	NIG	Youssouf Oumarou
—	FW	BEN	Bienvenu Vigninou

== Out on loan ==
Note: Flags indicate national team as defined under FIFA eligibility rules; some limited exceptions apply. Players may hold more than one non-FIFA nationality.

No.	Pos.	Nation	Player

== Presidents ==
Nat.	Name	Term
(Tunisia)	Mohamed Mahjoub	2022–present
(Tunisia)	Noureddine Ben Brick	2021–2022
(Tunisia)	Jalel Ben Aïssa	2016–2021
(Tunisia)	Ghazi Ben Tounes	2015–2016
(Tunisia)	Anouar Haddad	2013–2015
(Tunisia)	Kamel Snoussi	2011–2013
(Tunisia)	Mohamed Derouiche	2008–2011
(Tunisia)	Mohamed Achab	2004–2008
(Tunisia)	Jalel Ben Aïssa	1998–2004
(Tunisia)	Moncef Cherif	1996–1998
(Tunisia)	Salah Azaïz	1953
(Tunisia)	Mahmoud Chaouche	1956–1962
(Tunisia)	Mohamed Salah Chedly	1956–1962
(Tunisia)	Bechir Charnine	1955–1956

== Managers ==
Nat.	Name	Term
(Tunisia)	Maher Kanzari	2024–2025
(Tunisia)	Hammadi Daou	2023–2024
(Tunisia)	Skander Kasri	2022–2023
(Tunisia)	Kais Ouni	2021
(Belgium)	Luc Eymael	2021
(Tunisia)	Ramzi Jermoud	2021
(Tunisia)	Ghazi Ghrairi	2021
(Tunisia)	Nacif Beyaoui	2021
(Tunisia)	Anis Boussaidi	2020–2021
(Tunisia)	Jalel Kadri	2019–2020
(Algeria)	Habib Draoua	1946–1951
(Tunisia)	Hameur Hizem	1978–1980
(Romania)	Alexandru Moldovan	1993–1994

== Rival clubs ==
- (Tunisia) ES Tunis (Derby)
- (Tunisia) Club Africain (Derby)
- (Tunisia) Étoile Sportive du Sahel (Rivalry)
