= 2024–25 Al-Orobah FC season =

Al-Orobah
2024–25 season
- President: Munis Al-Dhawi
- Manager: Álvaro Pacheco (until 2 January); Adnan Hamad (from 12 January until 1 May); Antonio Cazorla (from 1 May)
- Stadium: Al-Orobah Club Stadium
- Pro League: 17th (relegated)
- King Cup: Round of 32 (knocked out by Al-Qadsiah)
- Top goalscorer: League: Omar Al Somah (11); All: Omar Al Somah (11)
- Highest home attendance: 8,300 v Al-Hilal; 11 January 2025; Saudi Pro League
- Lowest home attendance: 85 v Al-Taawoun; 26 May 2025; Saudi Pro League
- Average home league attendance: 2,307
- All statistics correct as of 26 May 2025.

The 2024–25 season was Al-Orobah's first season back in the Pro League following their promotion the previous season and the 50th seasons in club history. Along with competing in the Pro League, the club also participated in this season's edition of the King Cup.

The season covers the period from 1 July 2024 to 30 June 2025.

== Players ==
=== Squad information ===
As of 1 February 2025

Note: Flags indicate national team as defined under FIFA eligibility rules; some limited exceptions apply. Players may hold more than one non-FIFA nationality.

No.	Pos.	Nation	Player
1	GK	KSA	Rafea Al-Ruwaili
3	DF	MAR	Ismaël Kandouss (on loan from Gent)
4	DF	KSA	Ziyad Al-Hunaiti
5	DF	FRA	Kurt Zouma (on loan from West Ham United)
6	MF	KSA	Mohammed Al-Qarni
7	MF	ISL	Jóhann Berg Guðmundsson
8	MF	CIV	Jean Michaël Seri
9	FW	ENG	Brad Young
11	DF	KSA	Hamed Al-Maqati
12	DF	KSA	Nawaf Al-Qumairi (on loan from Al-Tai)
13	DF	KSA	Ibrahim Al-Zubaidi
14	MF	JOR	Mohannad Abu Taha (on loan from Al-Karkh)
18	DF	KSA	Abdulmalek Al-Shammeri (on loan from Al-Taawoun)
22	GK	KSA	Saud Al-Ruwaili
27	MF	KSA	Fawaz Al-Torais

No.	Pos.	Nation	Player
28	GK	BEL	Gaëtan Coucke
29	FW	KSA	Fahad Al-Zubaidi (on loan from Al-Nassr)
30	MF	KSA	Fares Al-Zubaidi
33	DF	KSA	Hussein Al-Shuwaish
37	MF	ESP	Cristian Tello
40	DF	KSA	Mohammed Al-Shanqiti (on loan from Al-Qadsiah)
48	MF	KSA	Ibrahim Al-Hamlan
50	GK	KSA	Mutni Al-Timawi
66	DF	KSA	Mohammed Barnawi (on loan from Al-Hilal)
70	DF	KSA	Abdulrahman Al-Anazi (on loan from Al-Fayha)
73	MF	CRO	Karlo Muhar
80	MF	KSA	Fahad Al-Rashidi
88	MF	KSA	Osama Al-Khalaf (on loan from Neom)
91	FW	YEM	Abdulaziz Masnom
99	FW	SYR	Omar Al Somah

=== Out on loan ===
Note: Flags indicate national team as defined under FIFA eligibility rules; some limited exceptions apply. Players may hold more than one non-FIFA nationality.

No. / Pos. / Nation / Player; 15 / MF / KSA / Farraj Al-Rashid (at Al-Jandal until 30 June 2025)	No. / Pos. / Nation / Player; 19 / FW / KSA / Omar Al-Sharari (at Al-Jandal until 30 June 2025)

== Transfers and loans ==
=== Transfers in ===
Entry date	Position	No.	Player	From club	Fee	Ref.
14 July 2024	DF	33	(Saudi Arabia) Hussein Al-Shuwaish	(Saudi Arabia) Al-Fayha	Free	
14 July 2024	MF	27	(Saudi Arabia) Fawaz Al-Torais	(Saudi Arabia) Al-Khaleej	Free	
18 July 2024	DF	13	(Saudi Arabia) Ibrahim Al-Zubaidi	(Saudi Arabia) Al-Ahli	Free	
6 August 2024	MF	80	(Saudi Arabia) Fahad Al-Rashidi	(Saudi Arabia) Al-Riyadh	Free	
12 August 2024	GK	28	(Belgium) Gaëtan Coucke	(Belgium) Mechelen	Free	
22 August 2024	MF	8	(Ivory Coast) Jean Michaël Seri	(England) Hull City	Free	
22 August 2024	MF	73	(Croatia) Karlo Muhar	(Romania) CFR Cluj	$1,680,000	
22 August 2024	FW	21	(Ghana) Emmanuel Boateng	(Portugal) Rio Ave	Free	
23 August 2024	FW	7	(Iceland) Jóhann Berg Guðmundsson	(England) Burnley	Undisclosed	
25 August 2024	MF	37	(Spain) Cristian Tello	(Saudi Arabia) Al-Fateh	Free	
26 August 2024	MF	6	(Saudi Arabia) Mohammed Al-Qarni	(Saudi Arabia) Al-Wehda	Free	
26 August 2024	FW	90	(Saudi Arabia) Mohammed Al-Saiari	(Saudi Arabia) Al-Qadsiah	Free	
2 September 2024	FW	9	(England) Brad Young	(Wales) The New Saints	$250,000	
12 January 2025	FW	99	(Syria) Omar Al Somah	(Qatar) Al-Arabi	Free	

=== Loans in ===
Start date	End date	Position	No.	Player	From club	Fee	Ref.
18 July 2024	End of season	DF	66	(Saudi Arabia) Mohammed Barnawi	(Saudi Arabia) Al-Hilal	None	
23 July 2024	End of season	FW	29	(Saudi Arabia) Fahad Al-Zubaidi	(Saudi Arabia) Al-Nassr	None	
29 July 2024	End of season	MF	70	(Saudi Arabia) Abdulrahman Al-Enezi	(Saudi Arabia) Al-Fayha	None	
20 August 2024	30 January 2025	MF	32	(Saudi Arabia) Sattam Al-Rouqi	(Saudi Arabia) Al-Taawoun	None	
23 August 2024	End of season	DF	18	(Saudi Arabia) Abdulmalek Al-Shammeri	(Saudi Arabia) Al-Taawoun	None	
31 August 2024	End of season	DF	5	(France) Kurt Zouma	(England) West Ham United	None	
2 September 2024	End of season	DF	3	(Morocco) Ismaël Kandouss	(Belgium) Gent	None	
2 September 2024	End of season	DF	12	(Saudi Arabia) Nawaf Al-Qumairi	(Saudi Arabia) Al-Tai	None	
31 January 2025	End of season	DF	88	(Saudi Arabia) Osama Al-Khalaf	(Saudi Arabia) Neom	None	
31 January 2025	End of season	DF	40	(Saudi Arabia) Mohammed Al-Shanqiti	(Saudi Arabia) Al-Qadsiah	None	
31 January 2025	End of season	FW	14	(Jordan) Mohannad Abu Taha	(Iraq) Al-Karkh	None	

=== Transfers out ===
Exit date	Position	No.	Player	To club	Fee	Ref.
30 June 2024	DF	37	(Saudi Arabia) Naif Almas	(Saudi Arabia) Al-Fayha	End of loan	
30 June 2024	DF	44	(Saudi Arabia) Ziyad Al-Jari	(Saudi Arabia) Al-Fateh	End of loan	
30 June 2024	FW	80	(Saudi Arabia) Hassan Al Salis	(Saudi Arabia) Al-Fateh	End of loan	
30 June 2024	FW	92	(Saudi Arabia) Fahad Al-Zubaidi	(Saudi Arabia) Al-Nassr	End of loan	
30 June 2024	FW	94	(Saudi Arabia) Turki Al-Mutairi	(Saudi Arabia) Al-Hazem	End of loan	
4 July 2024	FW	96	(France) Béni Nkololo	(Romania) CFR Cluj	Free	
12 July 2024	GK	29	(Lithuania) Džiugas Bartkus	(Saudi Arabia) Al-Bukiryah	Free	
16 July 2024	MF	13	(Saudi Arabia) Ahmed Karenshi	(Saudi Arabia) Al-Faisaly	Free	
18 July 2024	FW	7	(Australia) Connor Pain	(Saudi Arabia) Al-Bukiryah	Free	
26 July 2024	MF	23	(Saudi Arabia) Fahad Al-Dossari	(Saudi Arabia) Al-Diriyah	Free	
28 July 2024	MF	10	(Saudi Arabia) Ibrahim Al-Harbi	(Saudi Arabia) Al-Jandal	Free	
3 August 2024	MF	3	(Saudi Arabia) Sulaiman Al-Nakhli	(Saudi Arabia) Al-Arabi	Free	
15 August 2024	MF	24	(Saudi Arabia) Mohammed Al-Sufyani	(Saudi Arabia) Al-Ain	Free	
16 August 2024	MF	38	(Saudi Arabia) Ahmed Al-Hazmi	(Saudi Arabia) Al-Qala	Free	
20 August 2024	DF	95	(Saudi Arabia) Ahmed Al-Habib	(Saudi Arabia) Al-Batin	Free	
24 August 2024	DF	27	(Brazil) Matheus Duarte	(Vietnam) Ho Chi Minh City	Free	
28 August 2024	DF	14	(Saudi Arabia) Bandar Darwish	(Saudi Arabia) Al-Wehda	Free	
8 September 2024	FW	98	(Albania) Rubin Hebaj	(Algeria) CS Sfaxien	Free	
13 September 2024	DF	20	(Saudi Arabia) Nawaf Al-Mutairi	(Saudi Arabia) Al-Jabalain	Free	
22 September 2024	DF	23	(Saudi Arabia) Mishal Al-Ruwaili	(Saudi Arabia) Al-Rayyan	Free	
1 January 2025	FW	21	(Ghana) Emmanuel Boateng	(Turkey) Gaziantep	Free	
16 January 2025	MF	6	(Curaçao) Vurnon Anita	(Netherlands) Volendam	Free	
23 January 2025	MF	8	(Netherlands) Mounir El Allouchi	(Saudi Arabia) Al-Zulfi	Free	
30 January 2025	MF	32	(Saudi Arabia) Sattam Al-Rouqi	(Saudi Arabia) Al-Taawoun	End of loan	
31 January 2025	FW	90	(Saudi Arabia) Mohammed Al-Saiari	(Saudi Arabia) Al-Tai	Free	

=== Loans out ===
Start date	End date	Position	No.	Player	To club	Fee	Ref.
30 August 2024	End of season	FW	19	(Saudi Arabia) Omar Al-Sharari	(Saudi Arabia) Al-Jandal	None	
13 September 2024	End of season	MF	15	(Saudi Arabia) Farraj Al-Rashid	(Saudi Arabia) Al-Jandal	None	

== Pre-season and friendlies ==
2 August 2024 Friendly	Al-Orobah (Saudi Arabia)	2–3	(Iran) Esteghlal	Erzurum, Turkey
17:00 TRT	Al-Zubaidi	Report	Rezavand; Ziljkić; Rezaeian	Stadium: Yüksek İrtifa Kamp Merkezi

5 August 2024 Friendly	Al-Orobah (Saudi Arabia)	2–2	(Turkey) Mardin 1969 Spor	Turkey
17:00 TRT	Al-Shuwaish,	Report

9 August 2024 Friendly	Al-Orobah (Saudi Arabia)	0–2	(Saudi Arabia) Al-Hazem	Erzurum, Turkey
10:00 TRT				Stadium: Kazım Karabekir Stadium

== Competitions ==
=== Overview ===
Competition	Record							
Competition	Pld	W	D	L	GF	GA	GD	Win %
Pro League	34	9	3	22	31	74	−43	26.47
King Cup	1	0	0	1	1	4	−3	0.00
Total	35	9	3	23	32	78	−46	25.71

Updated to match played 26 May 2025
Source: Competitions

=== Pro League ===
==== League table ====
Pos	Team	Pld	W	D	L	GF	GA	GD	Pts	Qualification or relegation
14	Damac	34	9	8	17	37	50	−13	35	
15	Al-Okhdood	34	9	7	18	33	56	−23	34	
16	Al-Wehda (R)	34	9	6	19	42	67	−25	33	Relegation to First Division League
17	Al-Orobah (R)	34	9	3	22	31	74	−43	30	Relegation to First Division League
18	Al-Raed (R)	34	6	3	25	41	66	−25	21	Relegation to First Division League

Source: SPL
Rules for classification: 1) Points; 2) Head-to-head points; 3) Head-to-head goal difference; 4) Total goal difference; 5) Total goals scored; 6) Fair-play points
(Note: Head-to-head record is used only after all the matches between the teams in question have been played).
(R) Relegated

==== Results summary ====
Overall								Home						Away					
Pld	W	D	L	GF	GA	GD	Pts	W	D	L	GF	GA	GD	W	D	L	GF	GA	GD
34	9	3	22	31	74	−43	30	5	1	11	15	33	−18	4	2	11	16	41	−25

Last updated: 26 May 2025.
Source: Saudi Pro League

==== Results by round ====
Round	1	2	3	4	5	6	7	8	9	10	11	12	13	14	15	16	17	18	19	20	21	22	23	24	25	26	27	28	29	30	31	32	33	34
Ground	A	A	A	H	H	A	A	H	A	H	A	A	H	H	A	H	A	H	H	H	A	A	H	H	A	H	A	H	H	A	A	H	A	H
Result	L	L	D	W	W	L	W	L	L	L	L	W	L	L	L	L	D	L	W	W	L	W	L	L	L	L	L	L	D	W	L	L	L	W
Position	16	16	15	11	9	11	10	12	12	13	13	12	13	14	14	16	16	16	13	13	14	13	12	12	13	14	15	16	16	15	16	16	17	17

Updated to match(es) played on 26 May 2025. Source: Saudi Pro League
A = Away; H = Home; W = Win; D = Draw; L = Loss

==== Matches ====
All times are local, AST (UTC+3).

Win Draw Loss Postponed

23 August 2024 1	Al-Ahli	2–0	Al-Orobah	Jeddah
21:00	Darisi 32'; Al-Johani (yellow card) 37'; Firmino 80'	Report	Muhar (yellow card) 60'; F. Al-Zubaidi (yellow card) 76'; I. Al-Zubaidi (yellow card) 80'	Stadium: King Abdullah Sports City; Attendance: 20,214; Referee: Sami Al-Jires

28 August 2024 2	Al-Wehda	2–1	Al-Orobah	Mecca
21:00	Ighalo 1'; Al-Najei (yellow card) 37'; Bacuna (yellow card) 83'; Khodari 90+3', (yellow card) 90+5'	Report	Al-Hunaiti 33'	Stadium: King Abdulaziz Sports City; Attendance: 780; Referee: Mamdouh Al Shahdan

15 September 2024 3	Al-Kholood	3–3	Al-Orobah	Ar Rass
18:50	Dieng 10'; Collado 52'; Maolida 89' (pen.); Al-Dossari (yellow card) 90+1'	Report	Seri 27'; Guðmundsson (yellow card) 28', (goal) 46'; Al-Rashidi (yellow card) 48'; Boateng 77'; Al-Shuwaish (yellow card) 85'	Stadium: Al-Hazem Club Stadium; Attendance: 687; Referee: Raed Al Zahrani

19 September 2024 4	Al-Orobah	1–0	Al-Fateh	Sakakah
19:00	Al-Maqati (yellow card) 22'; Tello 50'; I. Al-Zubaidi (yellow card) 53'; Muhar (yellow card) 57'; Guðmundsson (yellow card) 84'	Report	Saâdane (yellow card) 29'; Zelarayán (yellow card) 49'; Denayer (yellow card) 77'	Stadium: Al Jouf University Stadium; Attendance: 2,710; Referee: Mohammed Al-Harbi

28 September 2024 5	Al-Orobah	1–0	Damac	Sakakah
18:50	Guðmundsson (yellow card) 39'; Tello 45+4'; F. Al-Zubaidi (yellow card) 65'; Seri (yellow card) 75'; Al-Shammeri (yellow card) 90+6'; Coucke (yellow card) 90+9'	Report		Stadium: Al Jouf University Stadium; Attendance: 1,033; Referee: Mohammed Al-Hoaish

5 October 2024 6	Al-Nassr	3–0	Al-Orobah	Riyadh
18:15	Ronaldo 17' (pen.); Mané 29', 71'	Report	Al-Maqati (yellow card) 60'	Stadium: Al-Awwal Park; Attendance: 14,018; Referee: Yael Falcón Pérez (Argentina)

20 October 2024 7	Al-Ettifaq	2–3	Al-Orobah	Dammam
21:00	Costa 44', (yellow card) 45+4'; Radif (red card) 45+9'; Wijnaldum 45+11'; Rodák (yellow card) 64'	Report	Al-Shuwaish (yellow card) 9'; Tello 12', 84'; Guðmundsson (yellow card) 47', (goal) 74'; Al-Saiari (yellow card) 66'; Kandouss (yellow card) 71'	Stadium: Al-Ettifaq Club Stadium; Attendance: 2,532; Referee: Mohammed Al-Harbi

24 October 2024 8	Al-Orobah	0–3	Al-Shabab	Sakakah
18:15		Report	Camara 38'; Al-Juwayr (yellow card) 41', (goal) 90+4'; Coucke 64' (o.g.)	Stadium: Al Jouf University Stadium; Attendance: 2,319; Referee: Ahmed Al-Rumaikhani

31 October 2024 9	Al-Okhdood	4–0	Al-Orobah	Najran
18:10	Koné 45+5' (pen.); Bassogog 64', 83'; Al-Rubaie 81'	Report		Stadium: Prince Hathloul bin Abdulaziz Sports City; Attendance: 431; Referee: Mohammed Al-Hoaish

7 November 2024 10	Al-Orobah	0–2	Al-Ittihad	Sakakah
20:00		Report	Al-Shehri 25'; Bergwijn 52' (pen.); Al-Ghamdi (yellow card) 84'	Stadium: Al Jouf University Stadium; Attendance: 4,688; Referee: Khalid Al-Teris

23 November 2024 11	Al-Raed	3–1	Al-Orobah	Buraidah
16:20	Al-Amri 18'; El Berkaoui 24', 58'; Sayoud (yellow card) 42'; Hawsawi (yellow card) 77'; Normann (yellow card) 87'	Report	Kandouss 11'; Muhar (yellow card) 53'	Stadium: King Abdullah Sports City; Attendance: 1,302; Referee: Majed Al-Shamrani

28 November 2024 12	Al-Fayha	0–1	Al-Orobah	Al Majma'ah
17:45	Al-Khaibari (yellow card) 6'; López (red card) 90+2'	Report	Kandouss (yellow card) 48'; I. Al-Zubaidi (yellow card) 79'; Boateng 90', (yellow card) 90+1'	Stadium: Al Majma'ah Sports City; Attendance: 404; Referee: Abdulrahman Al-Sultan

6 December 2024 13	Al-Orobah	0–1	Al-Riyadh	Sakakah
17:55	Muhar (yellow card) 39'; Al-Qarni (yellow card) 57'	Report	Assiri (red card) 29'; Tozé 80'; Borjan (yellow card) 90+2'	Stadium: Al Jouf University Stadium; Attendance: 428; Referee: Abdullah Al-Kharboush

11 January 2025 14	Al-Orobah	0–5	Al-Hilal	Sakakah
16:45	Al-Shuwaish (yellow card) 4'; Al-Saiari (yellow card) 13'; Al-Maqati (yellow card) 14'; Young (yellow card) 90+3'	Report	Neves 16' (pen.); Al-Bulaihi 48'; Lodi 68', (yellow card) 82'; Leonardo 75', 78'	Stadium: Al Jouf University Stadium; Attendance: 8,300; Referee: Rade Obrenovič (Slovenia)

17 January 2025 15	Al-Khaleej	3–0	Al-Orobah	Dammam
16:15	Martins (yellow card) 9', (goal) 32'; Al Salem 22'; Hamzi (yellow card) 37'; Fortounis (yellow card) 70'; Sherif 90+5'	Report	Tello (yellow card) 15'; Al-Shammeri (red card) 89'; Young (yellow card) 90+4'	Stadium: Prince Mohamed bin Fahd Stadium; Attendance: 2,314; Referee: Abdulsamad Bakri

22 January 2025 16	Al-Orobah	0–2	Al-Qadsiah	Sakakah
17:00	Muhar (yellow card) 63'	Report	Aubameyang (yellow card) 24'; Quiñones 28', 31'; Al-Ammar (yellow card) 32'; Puertas (yellow card) 53'	Stadium: Al Jouf University Stadium; Attendance: 847; Referee: Cláudio Pereira (Portugal)

26 January 2025 17	Al-Taawoun	0–0	Al-Orobah	Buraidah
18:20	Al-Ahmed (red card) 50'	Report	Al-Maqati (yellow card) 70'; Al-Qarni (yellow card) 90+1'; Al Somah (yellow card) 90+3'	Stadium: Al-Taawoun Club Stadium; Attendance: 1,813; Referee: Shukri Al-Hanfoush

30 January 2025 18	Al-Orobah	0–2	Al-Ahli	Sakakah
17:00	Al-Rashidi (yellow card) 16'; Guðmundsson (yellow card) 75'	Report	Al-Johani 9', (yellow card) 61'; Balobaid (yellow card) 66'; Al-Majhad (yellow card) 87'; Toney 90+6' (pen.)	Stadium: Al Jouf University Stadium; Attendance: 2,381; Referee: Andrés Matonte (Uruguay)

7 February 2025 19	Al-Orobah	4–2	Al-Wehda	Sakakah
16:05	Young 3'; Al Somah 44' (pen.), 51'; Al-Rashidi (yellow card) 53'; I. Al-Zubaidi (yellow card) 55'; Tello 90+7'	Report	Bguir 8', 61'; Al-Najei (yellow card) 90+5'; Crețu (yellow card) 90+9'	Stadium: Al Jouf University Stadium; Attendance: 1,363; Referee: Mohammed Al-Hoaish

14 February 2025 20	Al-Orobah	2–0	Al-Kholood	Sakakah
16:00	Al-Maqati (yellow card) 32'; Guðmundsson (yellow card) 41'; Al Somah 63'; Muhar (yellow card) 71'; Abu Taha 87'	Report	Al-Safri (yellow card) 9'; Maolida (yellow card) 28'; Sawaan (yellow card) 40'; Hawsawi (yellow card) 79'; Jahfali (yellow card) 84'	Stadium: Al Jouf University Stadium; Attendance: 1,526; Referee: Abdullah Al-Owaidan

20 February 2025 21	Al-Fateh	1–0	Al-Orobah	Al-Hasa
18:15	Youssouf (yellow card) 25'; Batna 31'; Saâdane (yellow card) 71'; Al-Julaydan (yellow card) 77'	Report	I. Al-Zubaidi (yellow card) 36'; Al-Qarni (yellow card) 86'; F. Al-Zubaidi (yellow card) 90+1'; Al-Torais (yellow card) 90+7'	Stadium: Al-Fateh Club Stadium; Attendance: 10,649; Referee: Sultan Al-Harbi

24 February 2025 22	Damac	1–2	Al-Orobah	Khamis Mushait
18:50	Harisi (yellow card) 85'; Al-Nemer 90+10'	Report	Guðmundsson (yellow card) 45+2'; Young 48'; Al Somah 63'; Muhar (yellow card) 76'; F. Al-Zubaidi (yellow card) 81'	Stadium: Damac Club Stadium; Attendance: 2,593; Referee: Faisal Al-Blwi

28 February 2025 23	Al-Orobah	0–3; Awarded (Note: Al-Nassr were awarded a 3–0 win due to Al-Orobah fielding an ineligible player. The original match had ended in a 2–1 win for Al-Orobah.)	Al-Nassr	Sakakah
22:00	Al Somah 40', (yellow card) 88'; Guðmundsson 65'; Al-Maqati (yellow card) 80'	Report	Qasheesh (yellow card) 34'; Boushal 51'; Brozović (yellow card) 52'	Stadium: Al Jouf University Stadium; Attendance: 7,527; Referee: Maximiliano Ramírez (Argentina)

8 March 2025 24	Al-Orobah	1–2	Al-Ettifaq	Sakakah
22:00	Al Somah 70' (pen.); Muhar (yellow card) 78'; Al-Qarni (yellow card) 82'	Report	Al-Khateeb (yellow card) 16'; Al-Maqati 39' (o.g.); Al-Malki (yellow card) 74'; Medrán 79'	Stadium: Al Jouf University Stadium; Attendance: 1,144; Referee: Ahmed Al-Rumaikhani

13 March 2025 25	Al-Shabab	6–0	Al-Orobah	Riyadh
22:00	Hamdallah 16', 59' (pen.), 82' (pen.); Guanca 34'; Bonaventura 52'; Hoedt 69'; Al-Juwayr (yellow card) 89'	Report	Zouma (yellow card) 81'	Stadium: Al-Shabab Club Stadium; Attendance: 3,175; Referee: Mohammed Al-Hoaish

4 April 2025 26	Al-Orobah	0–1	Al-Okhdood	Sakakah
17:45	Tello (yellow card) 79'	Report	Godwin 24'; Lowe (yellow card) 53'	Stadium: Al Jouf University Stadium; Attendance: 650; Referee: Andris Treimanis (Latvia)

10 April 2025 27	Al-Ittihad	2–0	Al-Orobah	Jeddah
21:00	Kanté (yellow card) 25'; Hernández 45+7', (yellow card) 50'; Diaby (yellow card) 87'; Al-Aboud 88'	Report	Tello (yellow card) 45+9'; Al-Torais (yellow card) 60'; R. Al-Ruwaili (yellow card) 66'	Stadium: Alinma Stadium; Attendance: 47,967; Referee: Anastasios Sidiropoulos (Greece)

19 April 2025 28	Al-Orobah	0–4	Al-Raed	Sakakah
19:25	Al-Shuwaish (yellow card) 32'; Young (yellow card) 59'	Report	El Berkaoui 45+1'; Abeid 49'; Sayoud 54'; Bouzok 57'	Stadium: Al Jouf University Stadium; Attendance: 2,933; Referee: Abdullah Al-Shehri

24 April 2025 29	Al-Orobah	2–2	Al-Fayha	Sakakah
19:30	Al Somah 11' (pen.); F. Al-Zubaidi 18', (yellow card) 44'; R. Al-Ruwaili (yellow card) 82'; Al-Torais (yellow card) 90+1'; Al-Khalaf (yellow card) 90+3'	Report	Al-Sahafi (yellow card) 45'; K. Kaabi 61'; Abdi (yellow card) 90+4'; López 90+6'	Stadium: Al Jouf University Stadium; Attendance: 556; Referee: Abdullah Al-Kharbosh

1 May 2025 30	Al-Riyadh	2–4	Al-Orobah	Riyadh
19:00	Haji 45'; Mensah 45+5'; Barbet (yellow card) 70'	Report	Al Somah 5', 58', 89'; Al-Qarni (yellow card) 42'; Abu Taha (yellow card) 45+3'; Al-Rashidi (yellow card) 81'; Guðmundsson 84'	Stadium: Prince Faisal bin Fahd Sports City Stadium; Attendance: 731; Referee: Mohammed Al-Hoaish

12 May 2025 31	Al-Hilal	4–0	Al-Orobah	Riyadh
19:05	Mitrović 28'; S. Al-Dawsari 65'; Kaio 90' (pen.), 90+2'	Report	Abu Taha (yellow card) 3'; I. Al-Zubaidi (red card) 47'	Stadium: Kingdom Arena; Attendance: 9,118; Referee: Erik Lambrechts (Belgium)

16 May 2025 32	Al-Orobah	1–2	Al-Khaleej	Sakakah
19:40	Kandouss 2'; Al-Khalaf (yellow card) 45+1'; Al-Maqati (yellow card) 49'; F. Al-Zubaidi (yellow card) 90'; Al-Torais (yellow card) 90+7'	Report	Fortounis 31' (pen.), 75', (yellow card) 87'; Al Hamsal (yellow card) 53'; Kourbelis (yellow card) 90+5'; Ozaybi (yellow card) 90+7'	Stadium: Al Jouf University Stadium; Attendance: 721; Referee: Faisal Al-Blwi

20 May 2025 33	Al-Qadsiah	3–1	Al-Orobah	Dammam
19:00	Aboulshamat (yellow card) 46'; Quiñones 65'; Aubameyang 77', 88'	Report	Al-Rashidi (yellow card) 41'; I. Al-Zubaidi (yellow card) 82'; Al Somah 90+4'; Al-Shuwaish (yellow card) 90+5'	Stadium: Prince Mohamed bin Fahd Stadium; Attendance: 10,984; Referee: Anastasios Sidiropoulos (Greece)

26 May 2025 34	Al-Orobah	3–2	Al-Taawoun	Sakakah
21:00	Zouma 18'; F. Al-Zubaidi 40'; Al-Torais (yellow card) 52'; Al-Rashidi (yellow card) 52'; Masnom (yellow card) 79'; Abu Taha 86'	Report	Martínez 22', 38'; Al-Marwani (yellow card) 90+2'	Stadium: Al Jouf University Stadium; Attendance: 85; Referee: Mohammed Al-Ismail

=== King Cup ===
All times are local, AST (UTC+3).

22 September 2024 Round of 32	Al-Qadsiah	4–1	Al-Orobah	Dammam
21:00	Quiñones 10', 51'; Puertas 37'; Thakri (yellow card) 45+1'; Aubameyang 90+1'; Casteels (yellow card) 90+5'	Report	Kandouss (yellow card) 58'; F. Al-Zubaidi (yellow card) 84'; Guðmundsson 90+6' (pen.)	Stadium: Prince Mohamed bin Fahd Stadium; Referee: Mario Escobar (Guatemala)

== Statistics ==
=== Appearances ===
Last updated on 26 May 2025.

No.	Pos	Nat	Player	Total		Pro League		King Cup	
No.	Pos	Nat	Player	Apps	Goals	Apps	Goals	Apps	Goals
Goalkeepers
1	GK	(Saudi Arabia) KSA	Rafea Al-Ruwaili	3	0	2+1	0	0	0
22	GK	(Saudi Arabia) KSA	Saud Al-Ruwaili	0	0	0	0	0	0
28	GK	(Belgium) BEL	Gaëtan Coucke	33	0	32	0	1	0
50	GK	(Saudi Arabia) KSA	Mutni Al-Timawi	0	0	0	0	0	0
Defenders
3	DF	(Morocco) MAR	Ismaël Kandouss	30	2	29	2	1	0
4	DF	(Saudi Arabia) KSA	Ziyad Al-Hunaiti	5	1	5	1	0	0
5	DF	(France) FRA	Kurt Zouma	20	1	16+3	1	1	0
11	DF	(Saudi Arabia) KSA	Hamed Al-Maqati	31	0	27+4	0	0	0
12	DF	(Saudi Arabia) KSA	Nawaf Al-Qumairi	14	0	3+10	0	1	0
13	DF	(Saudi Arabia) KSA	Ibrahim Al-Zubaidi	25	0	22+2	0	0+1	0
18	DF	(Saudi Arabia) KSA	Abdulmalek Al-Shammeri	25	0	10+14	0	1	0
33	DF	(Saudi Arabia) KSA	Hussein Al-Shuwaish	30	0	25+4	0	1	0
40	DF	(Saudi Arabia) KSA	Mohammed Al-Shanqiti	3	0	0+3	0	0	0
66	DF	(Saudi Arabia) KSA	Mohammed Barnawi	4	0	1+3	0	0	0
70	DF	(Saudi Arabia) KSA	Abdulrahman Al-Anazi	7	0	2+5	0	0	0
Midfielders
6	MF	(Saudi Arabia) KSA	Mohammed Al-Qarni	21	0	11+10	0	0	0
8	MF	(Ivory Coast) CIV	Jean Michaël Seri	6	1	5	1	1	0
14	MF	(Jordan) JOR	Mohannad Abu Taha	16	2	15+1	2	0	0
27	MF	(Saudi Arabia) KSA	Fawaz Al-Torais	19	0	7+12	0	0	0
30	MF	(Saudi Arabia) KSA	Fares Al-Zubaidi	0	0	0	0	0	0
37	MF	(Spain) ESP	Cristian Tello	27	5	20+6	5	1	0
48	MF	(Saudi Arabia) KSA	Ibrahim Al-Hamlan	0	0	0	0	0	0
73	MF	(Croatia) CRO	Karlo Muhar	32	0	30+1	0	1	0
80	MF	(Saudi Arabia) KSA	Fahad Al-Rashidi	22	0	16+5	0	0+1	0
88	MF	(Saudi Arabia) KSA	Osama Al-Khalaf	11	0	6+5	0	0	0
Forwards
7	FW	(Iceland) ISL	Jóhann Berg Guðmundsson	29	5	28	4	1	1
9	FW	(England) ENG	Brad Young	17	2	11+5	2	0+1	0
29	FW	(Saudi Arabia) KSA	Fahad Al-Zubaidi	30	2	16+13	2	0+1	0
91	FW	(Yemen) YEM	Abdulaziz Masnom	3	0	0+3	0	0	0
99	FW	(Syria) SYR	Omar Al Somah	17	11	17	11	0	0
Players sent out on loan this season
15	MF	(Saudi Arabia) KSA	Farraj Al-Rashed	1	0	0+1	0	0	0
19	FW	(Saudi Arabia) KSA	Omar Al-Sharari	0	0	0	0	0	0
Player who made an appearance this season but left the club
21	FW	(Ghana) GHA	Emmanuel Boateng	14	2	13	2	0+1	0
23	DF	(Saudi Arabia) KSA	Mishal Al-Ruwaili	0	0	0	0	0	0
32	MF	(Saudi Arabia) KSA	Sattam Al-Rouqi	8	0	2+6	0	0	0
90	FW	(Saudi Arabia) KSA	Mohammed Al-Saiari	10	0	3+6	0	1	0

=== Goalscorers ===
Rank	No.	Pos	Nat	Name	Pro League	King Cup	Total
1	99	FW	(Syria)	Omar Al Somah	11	0	11
2	7	FW	(Iceland)	Jóhann Berg Guðmundsson	4	1	5
2	37	MF	(Spain)	Cristian Tello	5	0	5
4	3	DF	(Morocco)	Ismaël Kandouss	2	0	2
4	9	FW	(England)	Brad Young	2	0	2
4	14	MF	(Jordan)	Mohannad Abu Taha	2	0	2
4	21	FW	(Ghana)	Emmanuel Boateng	2	0	2
4	29	FW	(Saudi Arabia)	Fahad Al-Zubaidi	2	0	2
9	4	DF	(Saudi Arabia)	Ziyad Al-Hunaiti	1	0	1
9	5	DF	(France)	Kurt Zouma	1	0	1
9	8	MF	(Ivory Coast)	Jean Michaël Seri	1	0	1
Own goal					0	0	0
Total					33	1	34

Last Updated: 26 May 2025

=== Assists ===
Rank	No.	Pos	Nat	Name	Pro League	King Cup	Total
1	14	MF	(Jordan)	Mohannad Abu Taha	5	0	5
2	7	FW	(Iceland)	Jóhann Berg Guðmundsson	4	0	4
3	37	MF	(Spain)	Cristian Tello	3	0	3
3	99	FW	(Syria)	Omar Al Somah	3	0	3
5	11	DF	(Saudi Arabia)	Hamed Al-Maqati	2	0	2
5	21	FW	(Ghana)	Emmanuel Boateng	2	0	2
5	27	MF	(Saudi Arabia)	Fawaz Al-Torais	2	0	2
5	33	DF	(Saudi Arabia)	Hussein Al-Shuwaish	2	0	2
9	9	FW	(England)	Brad Young	1	0	1
9	12	DF	(Saudi Arabia)	Nawaf Al-Qumairi	1	0	1
9	13	DF	(Saudi Arabia)	Ibrahim Al-Zubaidi	1	0	1
9	29	FW	(Saudi Arabia)	Fahad Al-Zubaidi	1	0	1
9	73	MF	(Croatia)	Karlo Muhar	1	0	1
Total					29	0	29

Last Updated: 26 May 2025

=== Clean sheets ===
Rank	No.	Pos	Nat	Name	Pro League	King Cup	Total
1	28	GK	(Belgium)	Gaëtan Coucke	5	0	5
Total					5	0	5

Last Updated: 14 February 2025
