= Kurt Zouma =

French footballer (born 1994)

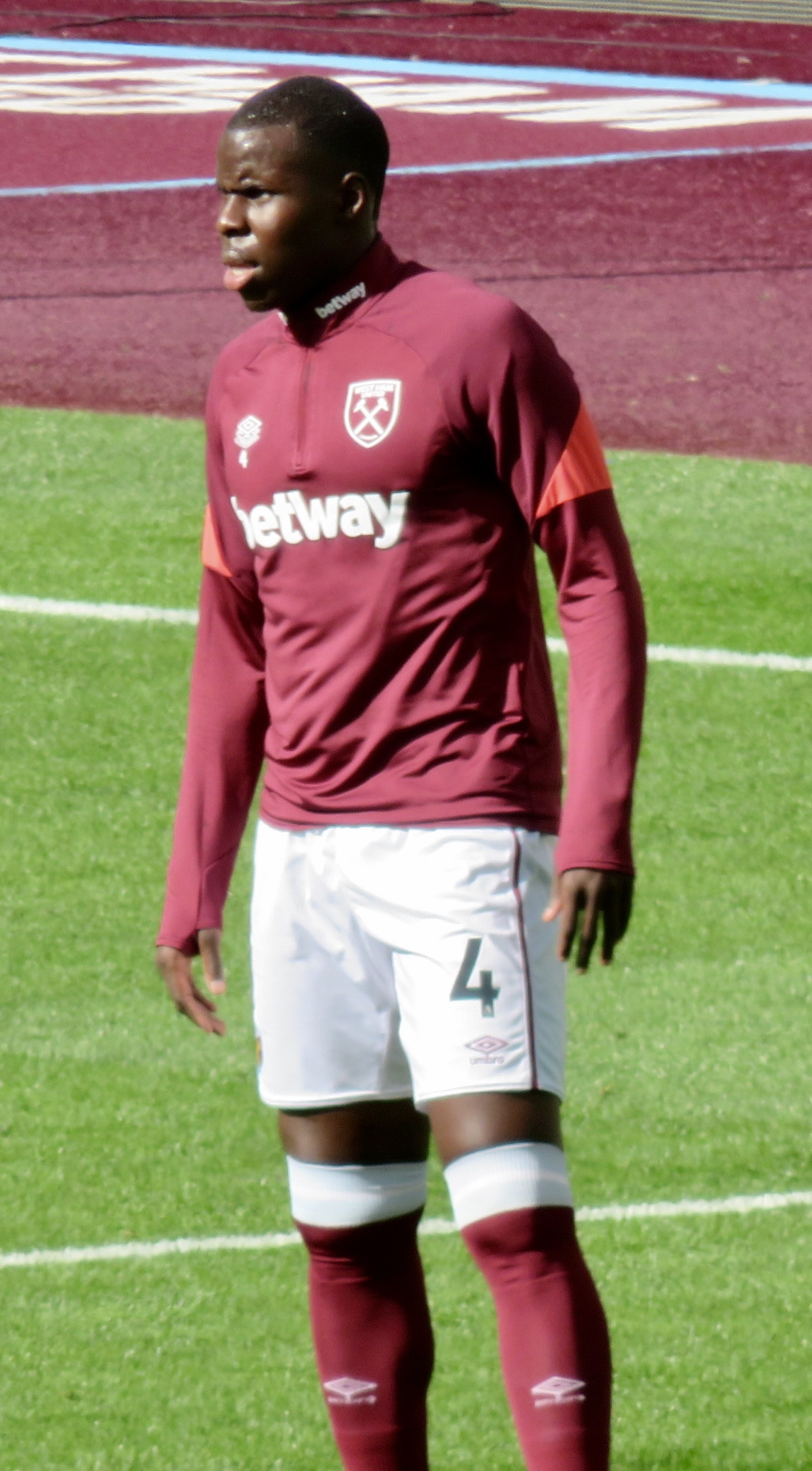
- Zouma warming up for West Ham United in 2021

Personal information
- Full name: Kurt Happy Zouma
- Date of birth: 27 October 1994 (age 32)
- Place of birth: Lyon, France
- Height: 1.90 m (6 ft 3 in)
- Position: Centre-back

Youth career
- 2003–2009: Vaulx-en-Velin
- 2009–2011: Saint-Étienne

Senior career*
Years	Team	Apps	(Gls)
2011–2013	Saint-Étienne B	10	(2)
2011–2014	Saint-Étienne	51	(4)
2014–2021	Chelsea	99	(6)
2014	→ Saint-Étienne (loan)	12	(0)
2017–2018	→ Stoke City (loan)	34	(1)
2018–2019	→ Everton (loan)	32	(2)
2021–2025	West Ham United	82	(6)
2024–2025	→ Al-Orobah (loan)	19	(1)
2025–2026	CFR Cluj	3	(0)
2026	Al Wasl	0	(0)
2026–	Palm City	3	(0)

International career
2010	France U16	6	(0)
2010–2011	France U17	17	(1)
2012	France U19	1	(0)
2013	France U20	9	(0)
2013–2014	France U21	7	(1)
2015–2021	France	11	(1)
Medal record
Men's Football
Representing France
FIFA U-20 World Cup
Winner	2013
- * Club domestic league appearances and goals as of 10 September 2026

Kurt Happy Zouma (born 27 October 1994) is a French professional footballer who plays as a centre-back for Palm City FC in the UAE First Division League.

Zouma began his career at Saint-Étienne, making his professional debut aged 16, and going on to win the Coupe de la Ligue with the club in 2013. Zouma joined Chelsea for £12 million in January 2014, but was loaned back to the French club for the remainder of the season. With Chelsea, he won two Premier League titles, an EFL Cup, a UEFA Champions League title and a UEFA Super Cup. After loan spells with Stoke City and Everton, he moved to across London to West Ham in 2021, winning the UEFA Conference League in his second season.

Zouma represented France at several youth levels, up to under-21. He made his senior international debut against Denmark on 29 March 2015.

== Club career ==
=== Early career ===
Zouma was named after a Jean-Claude Van Damme character, Kurt Sloan in the 1989 film Kickboxer. Born in Lyon, Zouma began his career at age nine with Vaulx-en-Velin until he was 15. He played as a right winger and also as a striker before switching to his current position of a defender.

=== Saint-Étienne ===
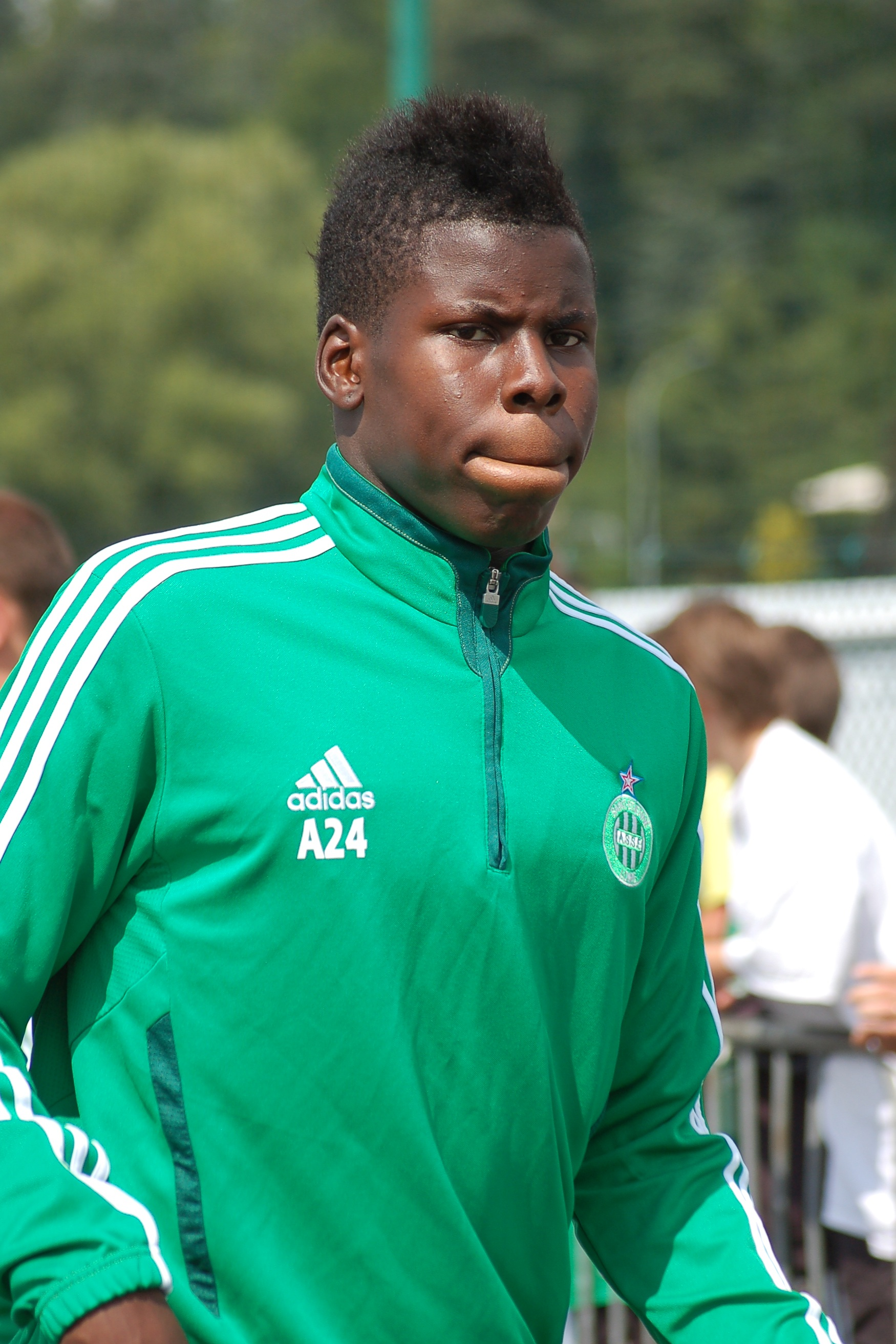
Zouma warming up Saint-Étienne in 2011

Zouma joined Saint-Étienne in 2009. On 2 April 2011, he signed his first professional contract, agreeing to a three-year contract. He was subsequently promoted to the senior team by manager Christophe Galtier ahead of the 2011–12 season, and initially played without a name on his shirt to protect him from media attention.

Zouma made his professional debut at 16 years old, on 31 August 2011 in a Coupe de la Ligue match against Bordeaux, playing the entire match in a 3–1 win. On 17 September, he made his Ligue 1 debut in a 3–0 loss at Lorient; his first professional goal came on 19 November, replacing Paulão after nine minutes and finishing a corner kick to confirm a 2–0 win before half time at OGC Nice. He totalled 21 league games in his first season – 13 starts – and his other goal came on 14 January 2012, heading Banel Nicolita's corner for the only goal against lowly Sochaux at the Stade Geoffroy-Guichard.

On 20 April 2013, Zouma played in Saint-Étienne's 1–0 win over Rennes in the final of the Coupe de la Ligue. Eight days later in the Derby du Rhone away to Lyon, he opened a 1–1 draw by heading Yohan Mollo's corner after half an hour of play. On 7 November 2013, Zouma was banned for ten games following a challenge that left Sochaux's Thomas Guerbert with a broken right leg and a dislocated ankle.

=== Chelsea ===
==== 2014–15 season ====
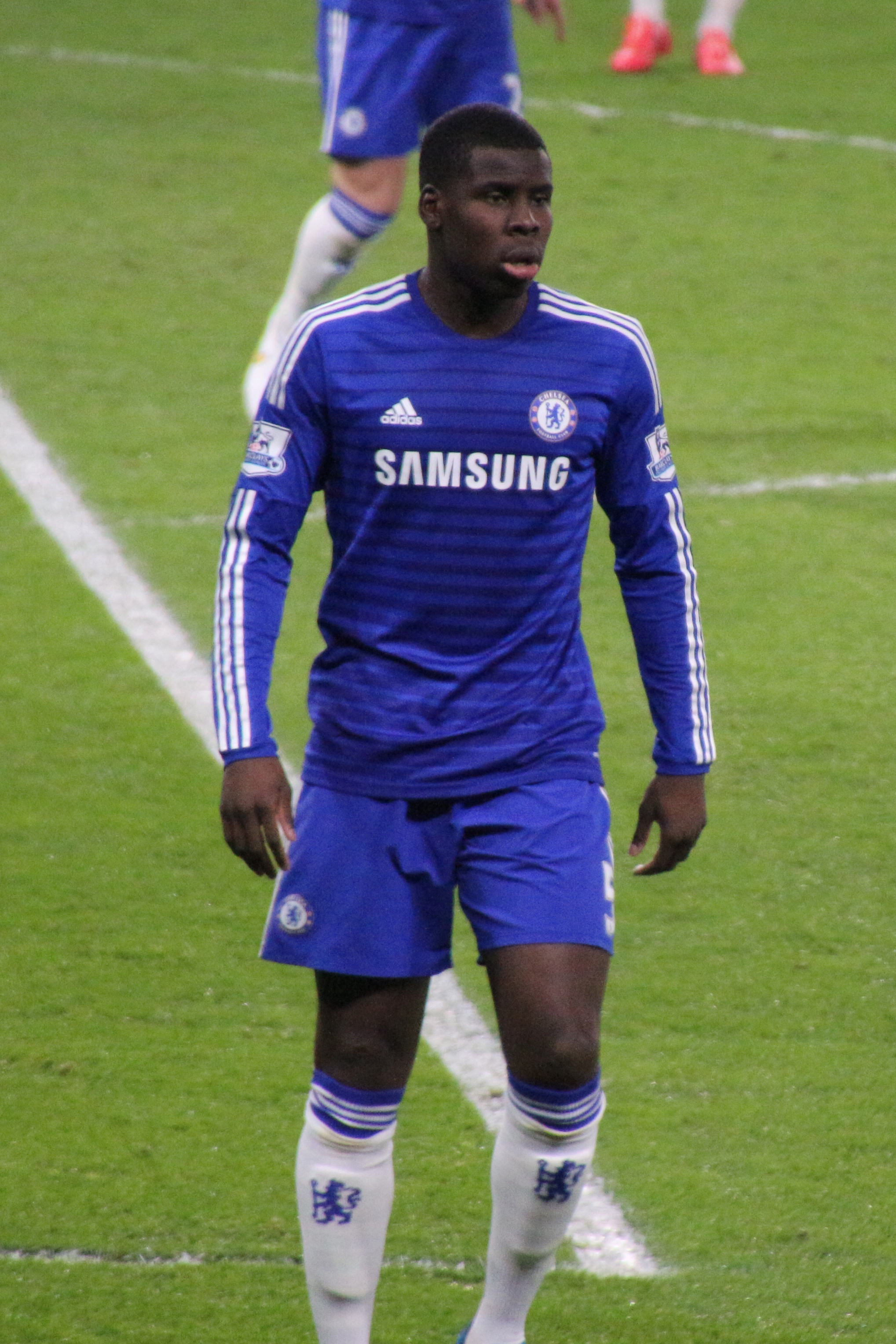
Zouma playing for Chelsea in 2015

On 31 January 2014, Zouma joined Chelsea on a five-and-a-half-year contract for a transfer fee believed to be around £12 million (€14.6 million). He remained at Saint-Étienne on loan for the remainder of the 2013–14 season.

On 24 September, Zouma made his first competitive appearance for Chelsea, scoring the opener in a 2–1 win against Bolton Wanderers in the third round of the League Cup. He made his second Chelsea start and first UEFA Champions League appearance on 21 October against Maribor, helping his team keep a clean sheet in a 6–0 win. He made his Premier League debut as an added-time substitute for Willian in the 1–1 draw with Manchester United at Old Trafford on 26 October 2014.

On 4 January 2015, Zouma scored the third goal for Chelsea in the 3–0 victory over Watford in the FA Cup. Six days later, he started in the Premier League for the first time, partnering John Terry in place of Gary Cahill and keeping a clean sheet in a 2–0 home win over Newcastle United, which put Chelsea back into first place in the league table. With Nemanja Matić suspended and Mikel John Obi injured, Zouma played in defensive midfield as Chelsea won the League Cup Final on 1 March after a 2–0 victory over Tottenham Hotspur. On 3 May, he featured as a substitute for the final five minutes in place of Willian as Chelsea defeated Crystal Palace 1–0 to win the league title.

==== 2015–2017 ====
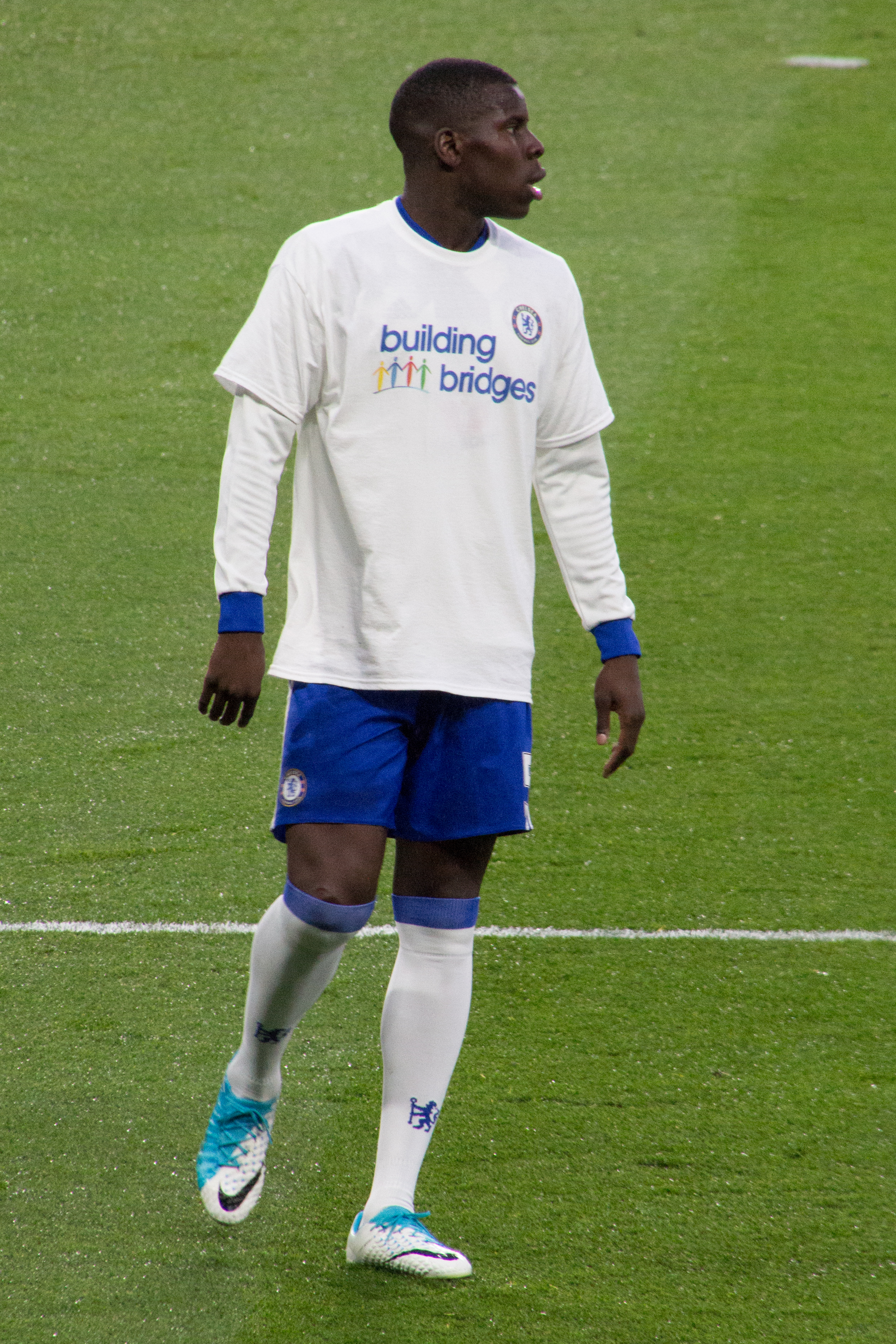
Zouma playing for Chelsea in 2017

On 2 August 2015, Zouma was a 69th-minute substitute for César Azpilicueta as Chelsea lost 1–0 to rivals Arsenal in the Community Shield. Starting ahead of John Terry, he scored his first Premier League goal on 19 September, heading in Cesc Fàbregas' cross to open a 2–0 home win over the same opposition. On 24 November, as a late substitute for the injured Terry, he scored his first European goal to conclude a 4–0 win at Maccabi Tel Aviv in the Champions League group stage. Under interim manager Guus Hiddink, Zouma regularly started alongside Terry as Chelsea's form improved. On 7 February 2016, Zouma ruptured the anterior cruciate ligament in his right knee after landing awkwardly from a jump in a match against Manchester United. He required surgery and was ruled out for six months.

In the summer of 2016, Zouma travelled and trained with the first-team during preseason. Chelsea also rejected a loan offer from Schalke 04. On 24 October, Zouma made his first competitive appearance after being out of action for nine months, playing 45 minutes for the Chelsea under-23 team in a 2–2 draw against Derby County. On 8 January 2017, Zouma made his first team comeback in Chelsea's 4–1 FA Cup third-round win over Peterborough United. On 4 February, he made his first appearance of the 2016–17 Premier League season as a substitute in a 3–1 win against rivals Arsenal.

==== 2017–19: Loans to Stoke City and Everton ====
Following agreeing to a new six-year contract with Chelsea, on 21 July 2017, Zouma joined fellow Premier League club Stoke City on loan for the 2017–18 season. On 12 August, he made his debut in a 1–0 loss at Everton. In November 2017, Stoke captain Ryan Shawcross expressed his surprise that Chelsea had loaned out Zouma, who had only missed one match, against his parent club. On 20 November he headed his first goal for the Potters, in a 2–2 draw at Brighton & Hove Albion. Zouma played 37 matches for Stoke in 2017–18 as the club suffered relegation to the EFL Championship.

On 10 August 2018, Zouma joined fellow Premier League club Everton on loan for the 2018–19 season. He made his debut on 25 August as a last-minute substitute for the injured Michael Keane in a 2–2 draw at AFC Bournemouth. Zouma scored his first goal for Everton on 13 January 2019, a header to open a 2–0 home win also against Bournemouth. He was sent off for two bookable offences, both for dissent after the final whistle in a 1–0 loss at Watford on 9 February.

==== 2019–21: Return to Chelsea ====
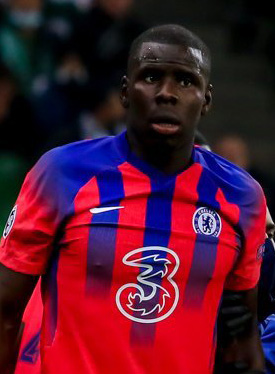
Zouma playing for Chelsea in 2020

Zouma returned to Chelsea following the expiration of his loan at Everton. He made 32 appearances and scored 2 goals with the club. On 11 August 2019, Zouma made his first appearance of the season as a starter in the 4–0 away defeat to Manchester United. He was back on the scoresheet against Grimsby Town on 25 September 2019, in a 7–1 home win in the third round of the EFL Cup. On 1 January 2020, Zouma marked his 100th appearance for the club as Chelsea drew 1–1 to Brighton & Hove Albion at Falmer Stadium.

Zouma began the new season in the starting back four for Chelsea's trip to Brighton & Hove Albion on 14 September 2020. He would go on to score the club's third goal in a 3–1 win, his first Premier League goal in over five years for Chelsea. On 6 December, Zouma headed in his team's second goal of a 3–1 win over Leeds United. The win put Chelsea at the top of the league table and was his fourth goal in the first ten league matches of the season, which meant he had twice as many strikes as the next highest-scoring Premier League defender. Through the first ten league matches, Zouma had also won 74.5 per cent of his duels, which put him among the top 20 players in Europe. Zouma made five appearances for Chelsea in their victorious 2020-21 UEFA Champions League run, however did not come off the bench in the final as Chelsea beat Manchester City 1–0.

Zouma's last appearance for Chelsea was in their win in the 2021 UEFA Super Cup against Villarreal on 11 August 2021. The game finished 1–1 before being decided in a penalty shoot-out. In August 2021 he left to join West Ham United. He had played 151 games in all competitions for Chelsea, scoring 10 goals.

=== West Ham United ===
==== 2021–24 ====
On 28 August 2021, Zouma joined West Ham United for £29.8 million signing a four-year contract. On 16 September, he made his West Ham debut, in the Europa League in a 2–0 win over Dinamo Zagreb. On 7 November, he scored his first goal for West Ham, the winning goal in a 3–2 victory over Liverpool. On 7 June 2023, Zouma played in the 2023 UEFA Europa Conference League final, against Fiorentina in Prague. West Ham won their first trophy in 43 years with a 2–1 victory. Following the departure of club captain Declan Rice, on 12 August 2023 Zouma was named as captain for the first game of the season, an away game to AFC Bournemouth. This was the first occasion in his professional career that he had captained a team. The appointment was criticised by The Times journalist Henry Winter, who wrote: "James Ward-Prowse is more deserving because he’s a natural captain and he’s never kicked a cat."

==== 2024–2025: Loan to Al-Orobah and departure ====
In June 2024, with a year left on his contract, Zouma was placed on the transfer list by West Ham. In August 2024, a proposed transfer to Shabab Al-Ahli in the United Arab Emirates collapsed after Zouma failed a medical.

In June 2025, West Ham announced Zouma's departure from the club on 30 June at the end of his contract. He had made 103 appearances and scored six goals.

=== CFR Cluj ===
On 3 September 2025, Zouma signed for Romanian Liga I club CFR Cluj on a two-year contract with an option for a further two years. He departed the club in January 2026 after making four appearances in total.

=== Al Wasl ===
On 26 February 2026, Zouma signed for UAE Pro League club Al Wasl until the end of the season.

== International career ==
Zouma is a France youth international having represented his nation at under-16 and under-17 level. He played with the under-17 team at the 2011 UEFA European Under-17 Championship and 2011 FIFA U-17 World Cup. Zouma has been the captain for the French under-21 team. He was part of the under-20 team that won the 2013 World Cup in Turkey. In the quarter-finals against Uzbekistan in Rize, he headed the last goal of a 4–0 victory.

Senior France manager Didier Deschamps wanted to build a defence around Zouma and fellow youngster Raphaël Varane, and on 19 March 2015, he was called him up for the first time for friendlies against Brazil and Denmark. He made his debut in the latter match ten days later, a 2–0 win at his former club ground with Saint-Étienne, the Stade Geoffroy-Guichard, replacing Morgan Schneiderlin for the last eight minutes of the game. After his injury for Chelsea in February, Zouma missed France's hosting of UEFA Euro 2016.

He returned to the squad in August 2017, replacing the injured Raphaël Varane for a World Cup qualifier against the Netherlands. He was put on standby for France's squad at the final tournament in Russia. Zouma earned his first France cap in over three years on 11 October 2018 as a substitute in a 2–2 friendly draw with Iceland, coming on as a substitute and winning the equalising penalty.

On 11 June 2019, Zouma made his first start for the France senior team, played every minute of the match and scored his first senior international goal, in the 4–0 away win over Andorra in a UEFA Euro 2020 qualifying match.

== Style of play ==
A November 2013 report by FourFourTwo noted Zouma's strength, reading of the game, and aerial presence, while mentioning his occasional lapses in concentration. In January 2014, Zouma was named by British newspaper The Observer as one of the ten most promising young players in Europe. The newspaper wrote, "Blessed with exceptional power and technique, Zouma is also coveted by many for his leadership qualities."

In February 2015, Match of the Day pundit Danny Murphy likened Zouma to Marcel Desailly, another Frenchman who played in defence for Chelsea. Writing after a draw with Manchester City, which included a strong run and perfectly-executed sliding tackle on Sergio Agüero, Murphy noted Zouma's reliability and confidence against the strong opponent, in addition to his pace. He predicted that Zouma could be a Chelsea mainstay for years to come, and would be an ideal replacement for captain John Terry, then aged 34.

Ryan Shawcross called Zouma the "ultimate defender" for his speed, jump, passing, shooting and tackling, and said that Tottenham Hotspur's Toby Alderweireld was the only central defender on his level.

== Personal life ==
Zouma's parents emigrated to France from the Central African Republic. His older brother Lionel plays in the same position, and his younger brother Yoan is also a defender. Zouma is named after Kurt Sloane, Jean-Claude Van Damme's character in the 1989 film Kickboxer, while his middle name Happy reflects an African tradition of using positive words as middle names. Zouma is married to Sandra, with whom he has three children. Zouma is a Muslim and made a pilgrimage to Mecca in 2019.

=== Animal abuse ===
On 7 February 2022, footage emerged of Zouma kicking, slapping and throwing objects at his cat, filmed at his home by his brother, Yoan Zouma. He was condemned by both his club (West Ham) and the RSPCA. Zouma apologised and said that despite his actions, his two pet cats were "fine and healthy". West Ham said that they would deal with the matter internally. On 8 February, a French animal welfare organisation, the Brigitte Bardot Foundation, announced that they had filed a complaint against Zouma. On the same day, Essex Police said they had launched an enquiry into the abuse in conjunction with the RSPCA. West Ham manager David Moyes selected Zouma to play in their match against Watford on the same day, despite the controversy. BBC Sport presenter Gary Lineker said he was "shocked and appalled that West Ham played Zouma" against Watford; Chris Packham called the decision to play Zouma an "absolute disgrace".

On 9 February, the RSPCA confirmed that Zouma's two cats were taken away from him and were in RSPCA care. Two of West Ham's sponsors, Vitality and Experience Kissimmee, respectively suspended and ended their relationships with the club, while Adidas ended its partnership with Zouma. West Ham fined him the maximum amount possible, with the money being donated to animal welfare charities. Sky News reported that the fine was understood to be two weeks' wages worth £250,000. On 10 February, National League club Dagenham & Redbridge suspended Yoan Zouma for filming the abuse of the cat.

On 16 March 2022, the RSPCA announced that after a full investigation they had started the process of bringing a prosecution against Kurt and Yoan Zouma under the 2006 Animal Welfare Act. Zouma was charged with animal cruelty under the act in April, and was ordered to appear at Barkingside Magistrates Court on 24 May. At court, he pleaded guilty to two counts of causing unnecessary suffering to a protected animal, his Bengal cat. He was ordered to carry out 180 hours of community service, pay £9,000 in court costs and was banned from keeping cats for five years. Yoan, his brother pleaded guilty to one count of aiding, abetting, counseling or procuring him to commit an offence. He was ordered to carry out 140 hours of community service.

=== Home burglary ===
In December 2023, Zouma and his family were the victims of a burglary on his home while he and his family were present. An armed gang broke in and stole £100,000 in cash and jewellery. West Ham offered a reward of £25,000 for information leading to the arrest and successful prosecution of the burglars.

=== Agent controversy ===
In 2024 his football agent Saif Alrubie appeared at Southwark Crown Court charged with sending an electronic communication with intent to cause distress or anxiety to Chelsea director, Marina Granovskaia. The court were told that Alrubie believed he was entitled to a percentage of the transfer fee when Zouma moved from Chelsea to West Ham in August 2021 for around £29 million and that he threatened Granovskaia with the same fate as Kia Joorabchian who had been physically forced to pay money owed to Alrubie. On 29 April 2024, Alrubie was found not guilty of the offence.

== Career statistics ==
=== Club ===
As of match played 31 October 2025

Appearances and goals by club, season and competition
Club	Season	League			National cup (Note: Includes Coupe de France, FA Cup, King's Cup)		League cup (Note: Includes Coupe de la Ligue, Football League/EFL Cup)		Continental		Other		Total	
Club	Season	Division	Apps	Goals	Apps	Goals	Apps	Goals	Apps	Goals	Apps	Goals	Apps	Goals
Saint-Étienne B	2010–11	CFA	7	1	—		—		—		—		7	1
Saint-Étienne B	2011–12	CFA	2	1	—		—		—		—		2	1
Saint-Étienne B	2012–13	CFA	1	0	—		—		—		—		1	0
Saint-Étienne B	Total		10	2	—		—		—		—		10	2
Saint-Étienne	2011–12	Ligue 1	21	2	1	0	1	0	—		—		23	2
Saint-Étienne	2012–13	Ligue 1	18	2	4	0	1	0	—		—		23	2
Saint-Étienne	2013–14	Ligue 1	24	0	0	0	0	0	3 (Note: Appearances in UEFA Europa League)	0	—		27	0
Saint-Étienne	Total		63	4	5	0	2	0	3	0	—		73	4
Chelsea	2014–15	Premier League	15	0	2	1	5	1	4 (Note: Appearances in UEFA Champions League)	0	—		26	2
Chelsea	2015–16	Premier League	23	1	1	0	1	0	6	1	1 (Note: Appearance in FA Community Shield)	0	32	2
Chelsea	2016–17	Premier League	9	0	4	0	0	0	—		—		13	0
Chelsea	2019–20	Premier League	28	0	5	0	2	1	7	0	1 (Note: Appearance in UEFA Super Cup)	0	43	1
Chelsea	2020–21	Premier League	24	5	5	0	2	0	5	0	—		36	5
Chelsea	2021–22	Premier League	0	0	—		—		—		1	0	1	0
Chelsea	Total		99	6	17	1	10	2	22	1	3	0	151	10
Chelsea U23	2016–17	—			—		—		—		1 (Note: Appearance in EFL Trophy)	0	1	0
Stoke City (loan)	2017–18	Premier League	34	1	1	0	2	0	—		—		37	1
Everton (loan)	2018–19	Premier League	32	2	2	0	2	0	—		—		36	2
West Ham United	2021–22	Premier League	24	1	2	0	0	0	6	0	—		32	1
West Ham United	2022–23	Premier League	25	2	0	0	0	0	7 (Note: Appearances in UEFA Europa Conference League)	0	—		32	2
West Ham United	2023–24	Premier League	33	3	2	0	0	0	4	0	—		39	3
West Ham United	Total		82	6	4	0	0	0	17	0	—		103	6
Al-Orobah (loan)	2024–25	Saudi Pro League	19	1	1	0	—		—		—		20	1
CFR Cluj	2025–26	Liga I	3	0	1	0	—		—		—		4	0
Career total			342	22	31	1	16	2	42	1	4	0	435	26

=== International ===
As of match played 16 November 2021

Appearances and goals by national team and year
National team	Year	Apps	Goals
France	2015	2	0
France	2018	1	0
France	2019	2	1
France	2020	2	0
France	2021	4	0
Total		11	1

As of match played 16 November 2021
France score listed first, score column indicates score after each Zouma goal

List of international goals scored by Kurt Zouma
No.	Date	Venue	Cap	Opponent	Score	Result	Competition
1	11 June 2019	Estadi Nacional, Andorra la Vella, Andorra	5	Andorra	4–0	4–0	UEFA Euro 2020 qualification

== Honours ==
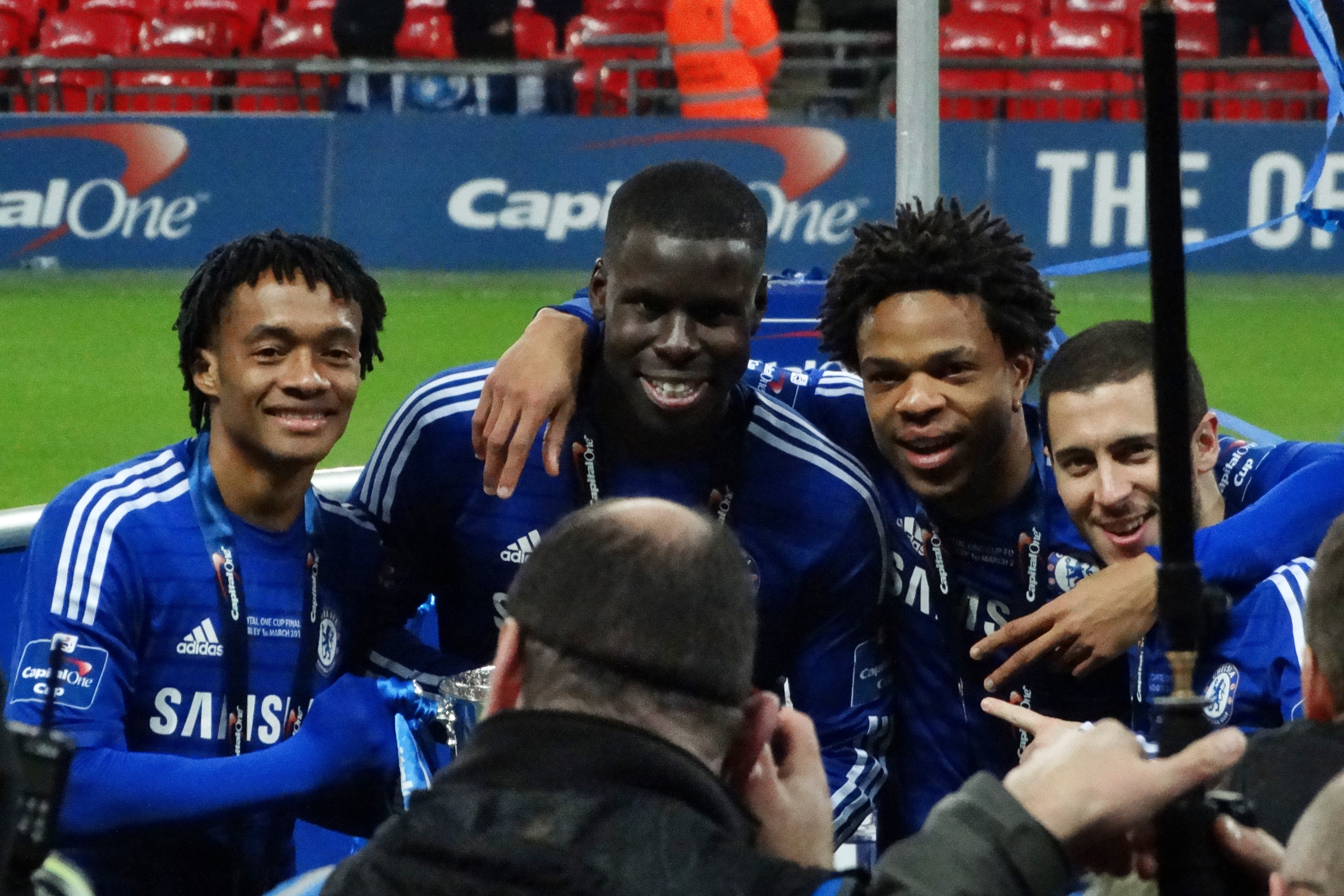
Zouma (second from left) celebrates winning the League Cup with Chelsea in 2015

Saint-Étienne

- Coupe de la Ligue: 2012–13

Chelsea

- Premier League: 2014–15, 2016–17
- Football League Cup: 2014–15
- UEFA Champions League: 2020–21
- UEFA Super Cup: 2021
- FA Cup runner-up: 2016–17, 2019–20, 2020–21

West Ham United

- UEFA Europa Conference League: 2022–23

France U20

- FIFA U-20 World Cup: 2013

Individual

- Chelsea Young Player of the Year: 2014–15
