= Fahad Al-Rashidi =

Fahad Al Rashidi may refer to:

- Fahad Al-Rashidi (footballer, born 1984), Kuwaiti football player
- Fahad Al-Rashidi (footballer, born 1991), Saudi football player
- Fahad Al-Rashidi (footballer, born 1997), Saudi football player
