= Jean Michaël Seri =

Ivorian footballer (born 1991)

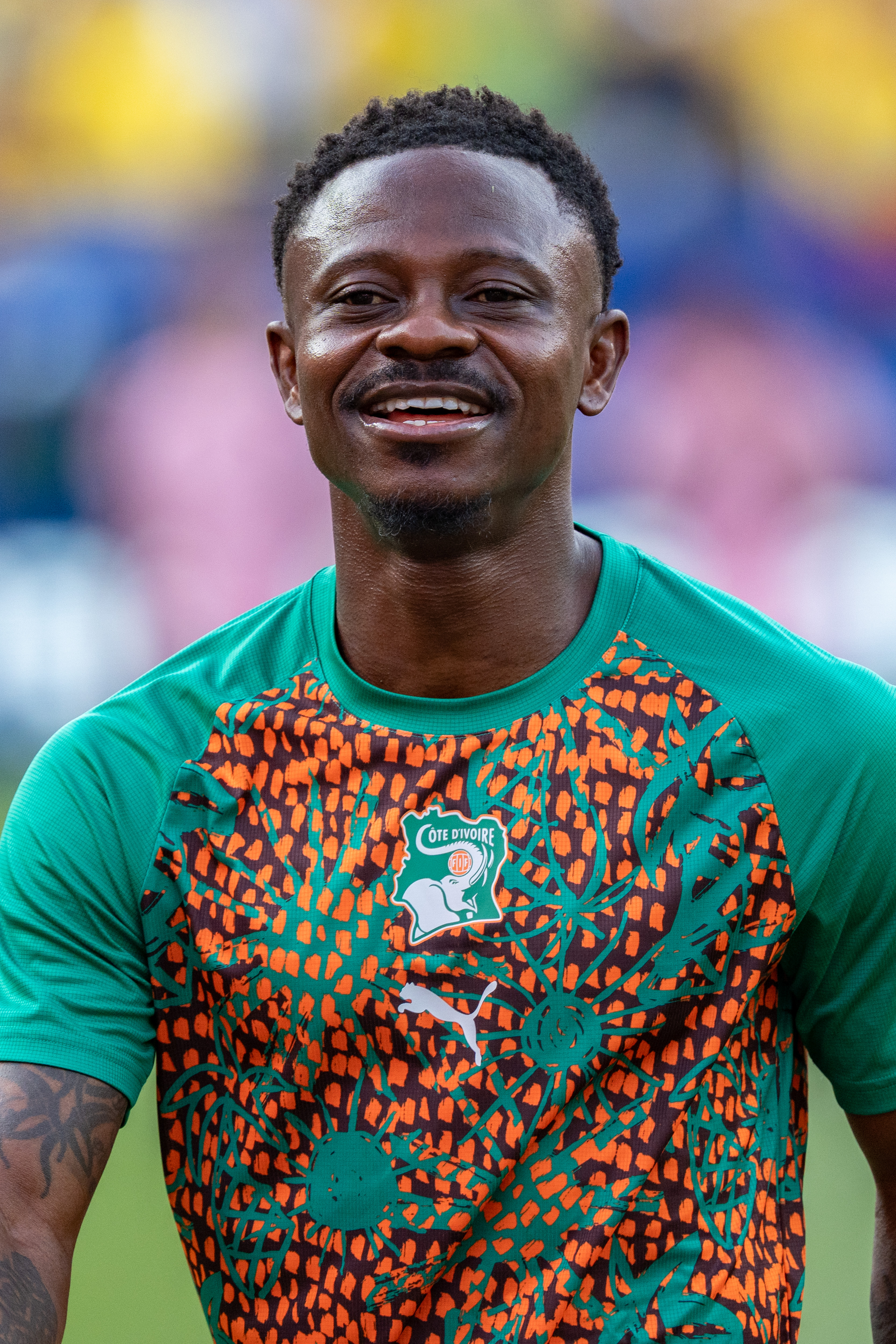
- Seri with the Ivory Coast in 2026

Personal information
- Full name: Jean Michaël Seri
- Date of birth: 19 July 1991 (age 35)
- Place of birth: Grand-Béréby, Ivory Coast
- Height: 1.68 m (5 ft 6 in)
- Position: Central midfielder

Team information
- Current team: Maribor
- Number: 14

Youth career
- 2007–2010: Africa Sports d'Abidjan

Senior career*
Years	Team	Apps	(Gls)
2010–2013	ASEC Mimosas	16	(1)
2012–2013	→ Porto B (loan)	19	(1)
2013–2015	Paços de Ferreira	54	(2)
2015–2018	Nice	103	(12)
2018–2022	Fulham	65	(2)
2019–2020	→ Galatasaray (loan)	27	(2)
2021	→ Bordeaux (loan)	12	(0)
2022–2024	Hull City	76	(2)
2024–2025	Al-Orobah	5	(1)
2025–	Maribor	12	(0)

International career^{‡}
2011	Ivory Coast U23	3	(0)
2015–2026	Ivory Coast	66	(4)
Medal record
Representing Ivory Coast
Men's football
Africa Cup of Nations
Winner	2023 Ivory Coast
- * Club domestic league appearances and goals as of 23:53, 4 April 2026 (UTC) ‡ National team caps and goals as of 22:40, 25 June 2026 (UTC)

Jean Michaël Seri (born 19 July 1991) is an Ivorian professional footballer who plays as a central midfielder for Slovenian PrvaLiga club Maribor.

== Club career ==
=== Early career in the Ivory Coast ===
In his native Ivory Coast, the young Seri was nicknamed "Galla", because he tried to emulate the former Monaco and Paris Saint-Germain midfielder Marcelo Gallardo, whose technical skills he admired. Seri joined the Ivorian football academy that was opened in 2001 by the Ivorian footballer Cyril Domoraud. "Jean is gifted, intelligent and respectful," Domoraud said in retrospect. "In his young days, he was one step ahead of the others, thanks to his ball control."

Born in the south-western city of Grand-Béréby, Seri began his career as a youth player with Abidjan club Africa Sports d'Abidjan in July 2007. The best clubs in Ivory Coast fought for his services. In January 2010, Seri started his career as a senior player by joining ASEC Mimosas, the most successful club in Ivorian football, where he needed just one season to prove himself and become one of the best players in the country. "He is a great listener, and his state of mind is impeccable," raved Sébastien Desabre, ASEC Mimosas's head coach from October 2010 to October 2012 when Seri was a senior player there, and that quality enabled Seri to make steady progress.

=== Porto ===
On 2 November 2012, Seri joined Primeira Liga club Porto on loan, after impressing their scouts. However, there was no place for Seri in the club's first team. He was thus forced to play for the club's reserve team, scoring once in 19 Segunda Liga matches in the first five months of 2013.

=== Paços de Ferreira ===
On 31 August 2013, two months after finishing his loan spell at Porto (the Dragões), Seri joined another Primeira Liga club Paços de Ferreira on a permanent basis and on a free transfer by signing a three-year deal. He debuted for the Pacenses on 14 September 2013 against Benfica in a Primeira Liga 3–1 away loss. On 2 March 2014, he scored a goal in the 54th minute to register his first competitive goal for Paços de Ferreira in a 3–1 Primeira Liga home win over Marítimo to send his side away from the relegation zone. It was at Paços de Ferreira where Seri's magnificent range of passing and ability to dictate the tempo of the game made him a fans' favourite. The club finished in eighth place in the 2014–15 Primeira Liga, and Ligue 1 club Nice were quick to sign Seri before bigger clubs took notice.

=== Nice ===
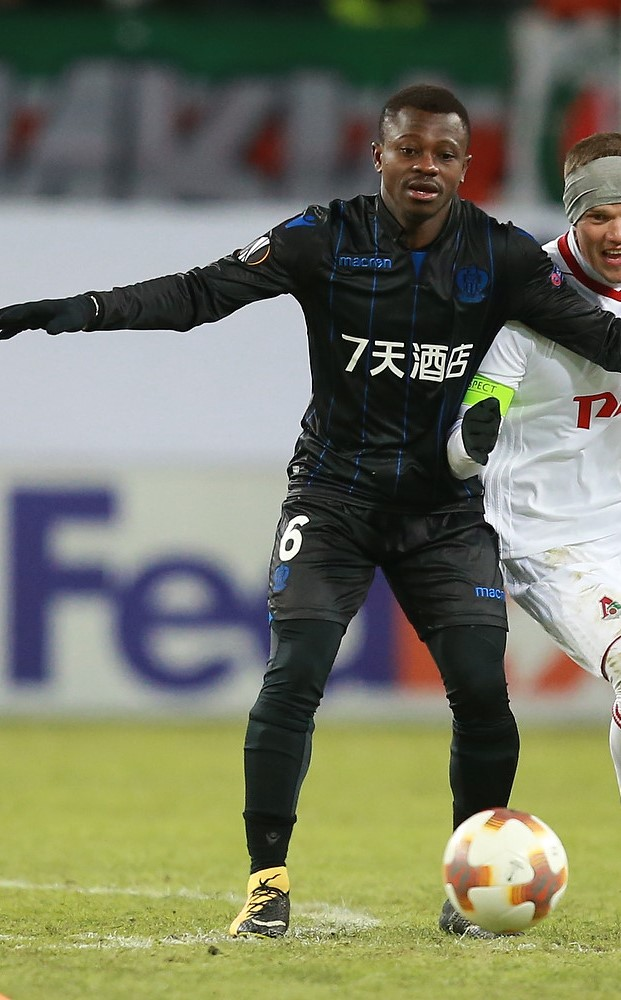
Seri playing for Nice against FC Lokomotiv Moscow in 2018

On 11 June 2015, Seri officially joined Ligue 1 club Nice for a transfer fee of €1 million. On 27 May 2015, prior to the opening of the transfer window, the club had announced the "very likely" arrival of Seri. On 8 August 2015, Seri made his competitive debut for Nice in their opening match of the 2015–16 Ligue 1 season, playing the entire match in the 2–1 home loss to Monaco. On 27 September 2015, he scored in the 53rd minute to register his first competitive goal for Nice in a 4–1 Ligue 1 away win over Saint-Étienne.

=== Fulham ===
In July 2018, Seri joined Fulham on a four-year deal until 2022 with an option for Fulham to extend the contract by a further year.

Seri scored his first goal for his new club on 26 August, opening the scoring against Burnley with a spectacular strike from outside the area. Seri picked the ball up and took one touch around an oncoming defender before curling in a long-range effort into the top corner of Joe Hart's net and the goal was awarded with the Premier League Goal of the Month for August.

==== Loan to Galatasaray ====
On 18 July 2019, Seri joined Galatasaray on a season-long loan deal, with an option to buy. Eventually, he would leave Galatasaray and return to Fulham at the end of the season.

==== Loan to Bordeaux ====
On 30 January 2021, Seri joined Ligue 1 club Bordeaux on loan until the end of the season.

==== Return to Fulham ====
Following his return from his loan spell at Bordeaux, Seri began playing again for Fulham starting his first match for the club for the season against Huddersfield Town, which saw Fulham win 5–1 in the Championship on 14 August 2021. On 2 May 2022, Seri both featured and scored in a 7–0 victory over Luton Town, this victory securing the Championship title for Fulham. Despite promotion back to the Premier League, it was announced that Seri would be leaving the club at the end of his contract in June 2022.

=== Hull City ===
Seri returned to the Championship on 8 July 2022 to join Hull City on a three-year contract. On 30 July 2022, he would mark his debut with the winning goal in a 2–1 home victory over Bristol City. His next goal for the Tigers would come on 10 April 2024, scoring his side's second goal in a 2–2 draw with Middlesbrough.

=== Al-Orobah ===
On 23 August 2024, Seri signed for newly promoted Saudi Pro League club Al-Orobah.

== International career ==
Seri made a total of three appearances for the Ivory Coast under-23 team, all of them at the 2011 CAF U-23 Championship held in Morocco, playing every minute of all their three Group B matches against South Africa, Egypt and Gabon. Ivory Coast finished third in Group B and thus did not qualify for the semifinals.

On 27 February 2014, Seri received his first senior international call up for the Ivory Coast in an upcoming friendly match against Belgium; he was an unused substitute in The Elephants' 2–2 away draw (held on 5 March 2014) against Belgium. On 6 September 2015, Seri made his senior international debut in a 2017 Africa Cup of Nations qualification match against Sierra Leone, playing the entire match in the 0–0 away draw. On 17 November 2015, Seri scored a goal in the 64th minute of the 2018 FIFA World Cup qualification second round second leg 3–0 home win over Liberia to register his first senior international goal.

Seri played two of Ivory Coast's three 2017 Africa Cup of Nations Group C matches as they finished third in Group C and thus did not qualify for the quarter-finals. In the 2019 edition of the tournament he also made two group stage appearances, starting against South Africa and Morocco.

Seri was a member of the Ivory Coast's squad for the 2021 Africa Cup of Nations and started in all four of the team's matches as they reached the round of 16, losing 5–4 to Egypt in a penalty shootout.

In December 2023, Seri was named in the Ivory Coast's squad for the 2023 Africa Cup of Nations, and ended up winning the tournament.

On 15 May 2026, Seri was integrated by Ivory Coast coach Emerse Faé in his list of 26 players in order to participate in the 2026 World Cup.

== Personal life ==
Seri is a devout Christian.

== Career statistics ==
=== Club ===
As of match played 4 April 2026

Appearances and goals by club, season and competition
Club	Season	League			National cup (Note: Includes Taça de Portugal, Coupe de France, FA Cup, Turkish Cup, King's Cup)		League cup (Note: Includes Taça da Liga, Coupe de la Ligue, EFL Cup)		Continental		Other		Total	
Club	Season	Division	Apps	Goals	Apps	Goals	Apps	Goals	Apps	Goals	Apps	Goals	Apps	Goals
Paços de Ferreira	2013–14	Primeira Liga	21	1	2	0	2	0	6 (Note: Appearances in UEFA Europa League)	0	2 (Note: Appearances in Primeira Liga relegation play-offs)	1	33	2
Paços de Ferreira	2014–15	Primeira Liga	33	1	2	0	0	0	—		—		35	1
Paços de Ferreira	Total		54	2	4	0	2	0	6	0	2	1	68	3
Nice	2015–16	Ligue 1	38	3	1	0	2	0	0	0	—		41	3
Nice	2016–17	Ligue 1	34	7	0	0	1	0	4	0	—		39	7
Nice	2017–18	Ligue 1	31	2	2	0	1	0	9 (Note: Four appearances in UEFA Champions League, five appearances in UEFA Europa League)	0	—		43	2
Nice	Total		103	12	3	0	4	0	13	0	—		123	12
Fulham	2018–19	Premier League	32	1	1	0	1	0	—		—		34	1
Fulham	2020–21	Premier League	0	0	0	0	2	0	—		—		2	0
Fulham	2021–22	Championship	33	1	1	0	0	0	—		—		34	1
Fulham	Total		65	2	2	0	3	0	—		—		70	2
Galatasaray (loan)	2019–20	Süper Lig	27	2	3	0	—		6 (Note: Appearances in UEFA Champions League)	0	1 (Note: Appearance in Turkish Super Cup)	0	37	2
Bordeaux (loan)	2020–21	Ligue 1	12	0	1	0	—		—		—		13	0
Hull City	2022–23	Championship	37	1	0	0	0	0	—		—		37	1
Hull City	2023–24	Championship	39	1	0	0	0	0	—		—		39	1
Hull City	2024–25	Championship	0	0	—		1	0	—		—		1	0
Hull City	Total		76	2	0	0	1	0	—		—		77	2
Al-Orobah	2024–25	Saudi Pro League	5	1	1	0	—		—		—		6	1
Maribor	2025–26	1. SNL	12	0	0	0	—		—		—		12	0
Career total			354	21	14	0	10	0	25	0	3	1	406	22

=== International ===
As of match played 25 June 2026

Appearances and goals by national team and year
National team	Year	Apps	Goals
Ivory Coast	2015	4	1
Ivory Coast	2016	5	0
Ivory Coast	2017	8	0
Ivory Coast	2018	6	1
Ivory Coast	2019	7	1
Ivory Coast	2021	4	1
Ivory Coast	2022	11	0
Ivory Coast	2023	4	0
Ivory Coast	2024	13	0
Ivory Coast	2025	2	0
Ivory Coast	2026	2	0
Total		66	4

Scores and results list Ivory Coast's goal tally first.

List of international goals scored by Jean Michaël Seri
No.	Date	Venue	Opponent	Score	Result	Competition
1	17 November 2015	Stade Félix Houphouët-Boigny, Abidjan, Ivory Coast	Liberia	3–0	3–0	2018 FIFA World Cup qualification
2	18 November 2018	Stade du 28 Septembre, Conakry, Guinea	Guinea	1–1	1–1	2019 Africa Cup of Nations qualification
3	19 June 2019	Zayed Sports City Stadium, Abu Dhabi, United Arab Emirates	Zambia	2–1	4–1	Friendly
4	13 November 2021	Stade de l'Amitié, Cotonou, Benin	Mozambique	3–0	3–0	2022 FIFA World Cup qualification

== Honours ==
Galatasaray

- Turkish Super Cup: 2019

Fulham

- EFL Championship: 2021–22

Ivory Coast

- Africa Cup of Nations: 2023

Individual

- UNFP Ligue 1 Team of the Year: 2016–17
- Prix Marc-Vivien Foé: 2017
- OGC Nice Player of the Year: 2017
- Premier League Goal of the Month: August 2018
- Africa Cup of Nations Team of the Tournament: 2023
