= Jóhann Berg Guðmundsson =

Icelandic footballer

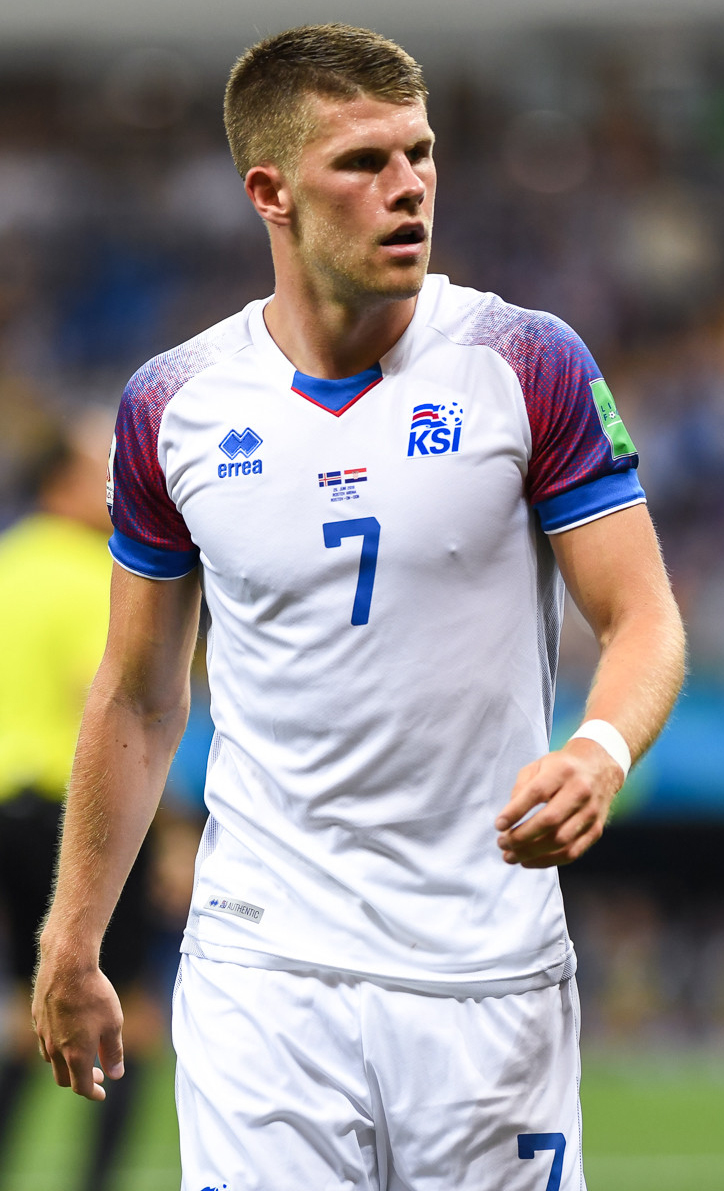
- Jóhann playing for Iceland at the 2018 FIFA World Cup

Personal information
- Full name: Jóhann Berg Guðmundsson
- Date of birth: 27 October 1990 (age 36)
- Place of birth: Reykjavík, Iceland
- Height: 1.79 m (5 ft 10 in)
- Positions: Midfielder; winger

Youth career
- 1997–2006: Breiðablik
- 2006: Chelsea
- 2006–2008: Fulham

Senior career*
| Years | Team | Apps | (Gls) |
| 2008–2009 | Breiðablik | 22 | (6) |
| 2009–2014 | AZ | 119 | (9) |
| 2014–2016 | Charlton Athletic | 81 | (16) |
| 2016–2024 | Burnley | 200 | (15) |
| 2024–2025 | Al-Orobah | 28 | (4) |
| 2025–2026 | Al Dhafra | 10 | (2) |
| Total | | 460 | (52) |

International career
| 2008 | Iceland U19 | 2 | (1) |
| 2008–2011 | Iceland U21 | 14 | (6) |
| 2008–2026 | Iceland | 102 | (8) |
- * Club domestic league appearances and goals

Jóhann Berg Guðmundsson (born 27 October 1990) is an Icelandic former professional footballer. A versatile player, Jóhann could be deployed as a defensive midfielder, central midfielder, right midfielder, attacking midfielder or winger.

Jóhann began his senior career at Breiðablik for a single season before moving to Dutch team AZ in the Eredivisie, where they also participated in the Europa League. After a few seasons with them, he joined Championship side Charlton Athletic for two seasons, before moving on to newly promoted club Burnley, where he featured for most of the 2017–18 season, qualifying for the Europa League.

Jóhann was part of the Iceland national team in both the UEFA Euro 2016 and 2018 FIFA World Cup, the former competition saw him assisting Iceland's first ever goal in a major tournament.

== Club career ==
=== Breiðablik ===
Born in Reykjavík, Jóhann started his career at Breiðablik, but moved to England early in his career when his parent decided to relocate there. He had spells with the youth team at Chelsea and then with fellow South-West London club Fulham, while studying at the International School of London. After failing to adapt to life in London, he decided to move back to Iceland in 2008, joining his boyhood club Breiðablik as he admitted missing playing football and attending school with his friends.

After returning to Breiðablik, Jóhann made his senior debut in the opening match of the season, where he played 72 minutes, in a 1–1 draw against Íþróttabandalag Akraness. He established himself as first team regular in the 2008 Úrvalsdeild, where he played often as left wing and striker, and scored his first Breiðablik goal on 7 July 2008, in a 2–0 win over Fylkir. Jóhann finished the season with 22 appearances, six goals, and was voted best player for the second third of the Icelandic Premier League season.

=== AZ Alkmaar ===
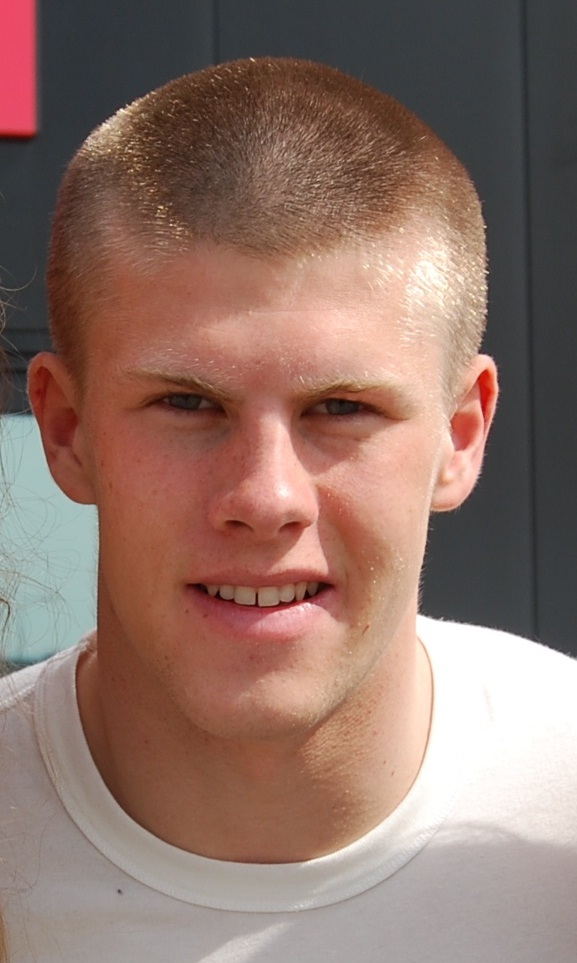
Jóhann at AZ

After an earlier bid from Hamburger SV fell through, Jóhann transferred to Dutch club AZ on 28 January 2009, signing a 5-year contract.

Having spent two seasons at the club's reserve, Jóhann was given a first team chance under the new management of Gertjan Verbeek. Jóhann scored on his AZ debut in the first round of Europa League Qualifiers, in a 2–0 win over IFK Göteborg in the first leg and went on to go through to next round despite losing 1–0 in the second leg. Jóhann then made his league debut for the club, playing in the opening match of the season, in a 1–1 draw against NAC Breda. Jóhann scored again in the Matchday One of the Europa League Group stage, in a 2–1 win over Sheriff Tiraspol and scored again in the third round of KNVB Cup, in 3 –2 win over Den Bosch. Jóhann then scored his first AZ league goal on 29 January 2011, in a 6–1 win against VVV-Venlo. Jóhann later finished the 2010–11 season, making thirty–four appearances and scoring four times in all competitions.

In the 2011–12 season, Jóhann started the season well when he scored in the first round of Europa League Qualifiers, in a 2–0 win over Jablonec and went on to go through to next round after a 1–1 draw. 30 days later, on 28 August 2011, Jóhann scored his first league goal of the season, in a 3–0 win over Groningen and scored against them once again on 22 September 2011, in a 4–2 in the second round of KNVB Cup. Then on 25 November 2011, Jóhann scored his second league goal, in a 2–0 win over Utrecht. On 6 January 2012, Jóhann signed a contract extension with the club, keeping him until 2014. Jóhann went on to score two more goals towards the end of the 2011–12 season against Heracles Almelo and RKC Waalwijk. Jóhann finished the 2011–12 season, making 47 appearances and scoring six times in all competitions.

In the 2012–13 season, Jóhann remained in the starting line–up until he received a straight red card in the 82nd minute, in a 0–0 draw against Heerenveen on 26 August 2012 and had to serve a two match suspension as a result. After serving a two match suspension, Jóhann then scored his first goal of the season on 28 October 2012, in a 2–1 win over Vitesse and scored a brace four days later in a 4–1 win over Sneek Wit Zwart. Jóhann's second league goal then came on 26 April 2013, as well as, setting up one of the goals, in a 4–0 win over Heerenveen. Jóhann played a role in the KNVB Cup campaign when he scored two more goals against Den Bosch and Ajax; and ultimately, helped them reach the final of KNVB Cup, in a 2–1 win over PSV Eindhoven, where he played 74 minutes before being substituted for Steven Berghuis. Jóhann finished the 2012–13 season, making 39 appearances and scoring six times in all competitions.

In the 2013–14 season, Jóhann scored his first goal of the season and played 98 minutes after the match went to extra time, in a 3–2 loss against Ajax in the Johan Cruyff Shield. By the end of 2013, Jóhann scored seven goals in the Europa League and league combined against Atromitos (twice), Maccabi Haifa, Groningen, Shakhter Karagandy, ADO Den Haag and Maccabi Haifa. It wasn't until the match of the season when Jóhann scored his first goal of 2014, where he played 21 minutes, in a 1–1 draw against Feyenoord. At the end of the 2013–14 season, Jóhann made 53 appearances and scoring nine goals in all competitions.

With his contract expiring at the end of the 2013–14 season, Jóhann announced his intention leave AZ. Jóhann explained his decision to leave AZ, citing new challenge by playing in England on a higher level.

=== Charlton Athletic ===
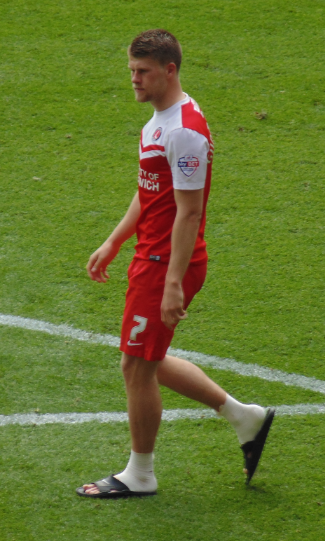
Jóhann wearing the shirt of Championship side Charlton Athletic

On 11 July 2014, Guðmundsson returned to London, this time moving to the Greenwich district, signing for Championship side Charlton Athletic on a two-year deal after leaving AZ. The move also marked his return to England after an eight-year absence. Upon joining the South East London outfit, Jóhann was given the number seven shirt ahead of the new season.

Jóhann made his Charlton Athletic debut in the opening match of the season, as they drew 1–1 away to newly promoted Brentford. He scored his first league goal for the club in a 1–1 draw against Rotherham United on 20 September 2014. By November, Jóhann soon suffered from three short-term injuries which hindered his playing time. Jóhann made a return to scoring form, following his recovery from injury, in a 2–2 draw against Leeds United on 4 November 2014. Throughout the season, he received plaudits in scoring a host of impressive goals, one such notable goal coming against Cardiff City on Boxing Day, for which he won Goal of the Season. Jóhann went on to score six more goals as the 2014–15 season progressed, including an effort against Blackpool which earned him March's goal of the month award. Jóhann was voted runner-up in the club's player of the season competition after an impressive first campaign, which saw him net a total of 11 goals in 37 matches.

Ahead of the 2015–16 season, Jóhann signed a new four-year deal with Charlton on 22 July 2015. Jóhann then opened his account for the new season by scoring two goals in two matches against Hull City and Wolverhampton Wanderers. Jóhann endured a period on the sidelines throughout December, after limping off during a match against Bolton Wanderers. After making his return to the first team, Jóhann went on to score four more goals for the club that season, against Preston North End, Birmingham City, Brighton & Hove Albion and Leeds United. Jóhann finished the 2015–16 season having scored six goals in 42 appearances across all competitions, as Charlton were relegated to League One, finishing 22nd place. Nevertheless, Jóhann was the joint–highest assist-maker in the Championship during the 2015–16 season.

=== Burnley ===
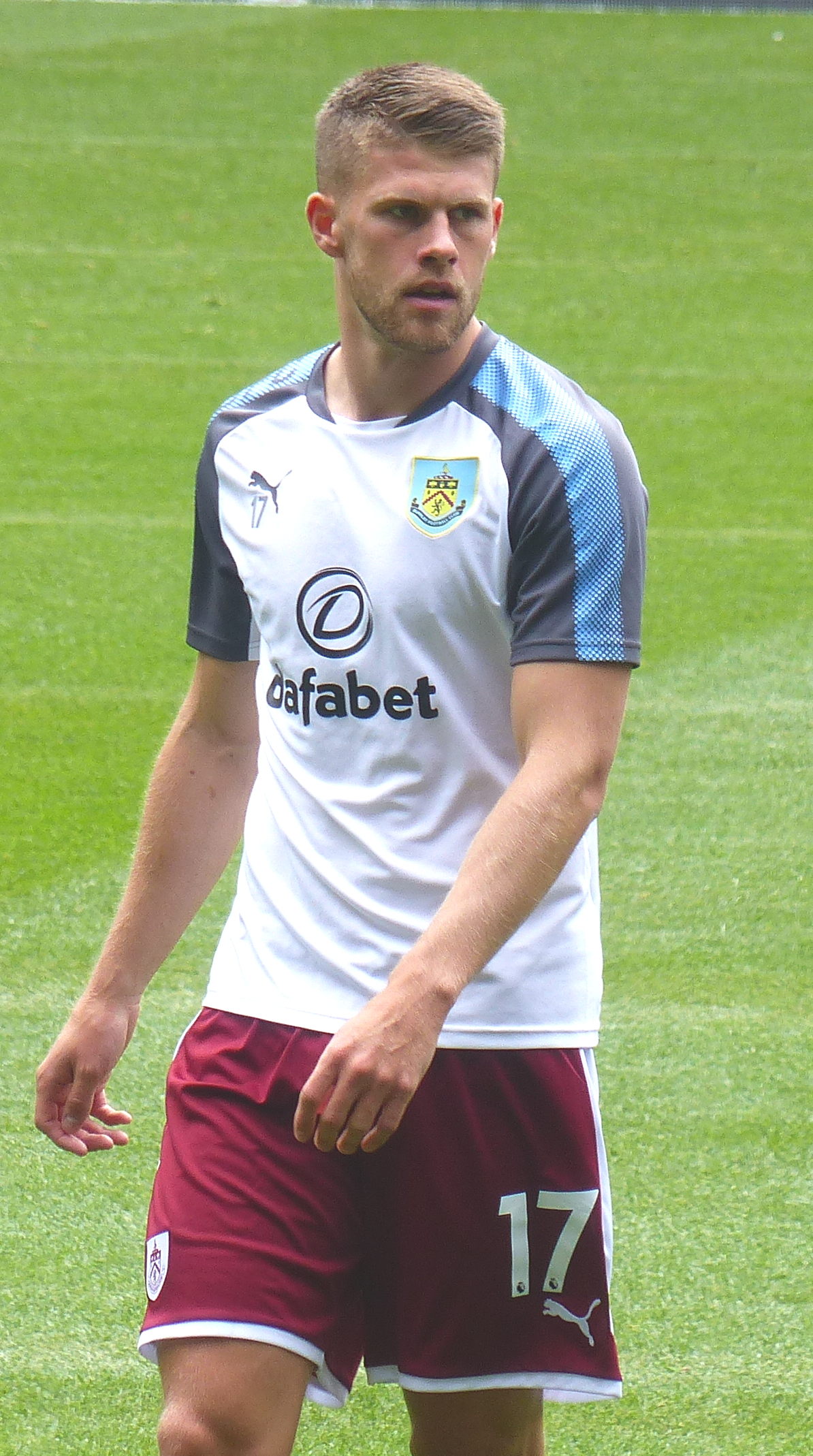
Jóhann with Burnley in October 2017

On 19 July 2016, Jóhann joined newly promoted Premier League side Burnley on a three-year deal for an undisclosed fee, alongside goalkeeper Nick Pope. He made his Burnley debut in their opening match of the season, coming on as a substitute for Scott Arfield in the 75th minute in a 1–0 loss to Swansea City. His first Burnley goal came on 5 November 2016, in a 3–2 victory over Crystal Palace. On 30 January 2021, Jóhann signed a new contract extension with Burnley until June 2023. Subsequently, on 6 February 2021, he scored his first goal of the 2020–21 season with the equalizer in a 1–1 home draw with Brighton. In January 2023, after returning to form and fitness, Jóhann signed a contract extension to June 2024, with the option of a further year. He finished the 2022–23 Championship season with 4 goals and 6 assists, including a brace in a 2–0 victory over promotion rivals Sheffield United, as Burnley secured promotion back to the Premier League as champions.

On 18 May 2024, it was announced that Jóhann would leave Burnley following the expiration of his contract and the club's relegation, after eight seasons with the club. However, on 6 July, following Scott Parker's appointment as new Burnley manager, Jóhann signed a new one-year deal to remain with the club going into the 2024–25 season.

=== Al-Orobah and Al Dhafra ===
On 23 August 2024, Jóhann signed for Saudi Pro League club Al-Orobah for an undisclosed fee. He scored four goals for the club, but they were eventually relegated from the top division by the end of the 2024–25 season. In July 2025, Jóhann joined Emirati side Al Dhafra.

== International career ==
Jóhann played his first U21 match for Iceland on 12 June 2008. On 12 August 2008, Jóhann was called up the senior national team for the first time. He won his first cap for Iceland in a friendly match against Azerbaijan, where he set up a goal. On 6 September 2013, Jóhann scored a hat-trick, the first person to do so for Iceland in 13 years, in a FIFA World Cup qualifying match against Switzerland, equalizing with the last goal of the match, a left-footed, curling shot from the edge of the 18-yard box in the 91st minute, with the match finishing 4–4. He was selected for UEFA Euro 2016 squad for Iceland and played his first UEFA Euro 2016 match, where he set up a goal for Birkir Bjarnason. This was the country's first ever goal in a major tournament when Birkir scored the equalizer against Portugal in their first group match. On 27 June 2016, Jóhann played against England in the UEFA Euro 2016 round of 16 at the Stade de Nice, as Iceland upset England with a 2–1 victory to advance to the quarter-finals. Jóhann went on to start every match for Iceland until they were eliminated from the tournament against France in the quarter-final.

In May 2018, he was named in Iceland's 23-man squad for the 2018 FIFA World Cup in Russia. On 13 November 2025, he made his 100th international appearance in a 2–0 away win over Azerbaijan during the 2026 FIFA World Cup qualification.

== Career statistics ==
=== Club ===
Appearances and goals by club, season and competition
| Club | Season | League | | | National cup (Note: Includes Icelandic Cup, KNVB Cup, FA Cup, King's Cup, UAE President's Cup) | | League cup (Note: Includes EFL Cup, UAE League Cup) | | Europe | | Other | | Total | |
| Club | Season | Division | Apps | Goals | Apps | Goals | Apps | Goals | Apps | Goals | Apps | Goals | Apps | Goals |
|---|---|---|---|---|---|---|---|---|---|---|---|---|---|---|
| Breiðablik | 2008 | Úrvalsdeild | 22 | 6 | 3 | 3 | — | | — | | — | | 25 | 9 |
| AZ | 2010–11 | Eredivisie | 23 | 1 | 2 | 1 | — | | 9 (Note: Appearances in UEFA Europa League) | 2 | — | | 34 | 4 |
| AZ | 2011–12 | Eredivisie | 30 | 3 | 4 | 2 | — | | 13 | 1 | — | | 47 | 6 |
| AZ | 2012–13 | Eredivisie | 31 | 2 | 6 | 4 | — | | 1 | 0 | — | | 38 | 6 |
| AZ | 2013–14 | Eredivisie | 35 | 3 | 4 | 0 | — | | 13 | 5 | 1 (Note: Appearance in Johan Cruyff Shield) | 1 | 53 | 9 |
| AZ | Total | | 119 | 9 | 16 | 7 | — | | 36 | 8 | 1 | 1 | 172 | 25 |
| Charlton Athletic | 2014–15 | Championship | 41 | 10 | 1 | 1 | 2 | 0 | — | | — | | 44 | 11 |
| Charlton Athletic | 2015–16 | Championship | 40 | 6 | 0 | 0 | 2 | 0 | — | | — | | 42 | 6 |
| Charlton Athletic | Total | | 81 | 16 | 1 | 1 | 4 | 0 | — | | — | | 86 | 17 |
| Burnley | 2016–17 | Premier League | 20 | 1 | 3 | 0 | 1 | 0 | — | | — | | 24 | 1 |
| Burnley | 2017–18 | Premier League | 35 | 2 | 1 | 0 | 2 | 0 | — | | — | | 38 | 2 |
| Burnley | 2018–19 | Premier League | 29 | 3 | 1 | 0 | 1 | 0 | 5 | 0 | — | | 36 | 3 |
| Burnley | 2019–20 | Premier League | 12 | 1 | 1 | 0 | 0 | 0 | — | | — | | 13 | 1 |
| Burnley | 2020–21 | Premier League | 22 | 2 | 3 | 0 | 1 | 0 | — | | — | | 26 | 2 |
| Burnley | 2021–22 | Premier League | 18 | 0 | 0 | 0 | 1 | 0 | — | | — | | 19 | 0 |
| Burnley | 2022–23 | Championship | 37 | 4 | 4 | 0 | 3 | 0 | — | | — | | 44 | 4 |
| Burnley | 2023–24 | Premier League | 26 | 1 | 0 | 0 | 1 | 0 | — | | — | | 27 | 1 |
| Burnley | 2024–25 | Championship | 1 | 1 | 0 | 0 | 0 | 0 | — | | — | | 1 | 1 |
| Burnley | Total | | 200 | 15 | 13 | 0 | 10 | 0 | 5 | 0 | — | | 228 | 15 |
| Al-Orobah | 2024–25 | Saudi Pro League | 28 | 4 | 1 | 1 | — | | — | | — | | 29 | 5 |
| Al Dhafra | 2025–26 | UAE Pro League | 10 | 2 | 1 | 0 | 1 | 0 | — | | — | | 12 | 2 |
| Career total | | | 460 | 52 | 35 | 12 | 15 | 0 | 41 | 8 | 1 | 1 | 551 | 73 |

=== International ===
Appearances and goals by national team and year
| National team | Year | Apps | Goals |
|---|---|---|---|
| Iceland | 2008 | 1 | 0 |
| Iceland | 2009 | 2 | 0 |
| Iceland | 2010 | 5 | 0 |
| Iceland | 2011 | 6 | 0 |
| Iceland | 2012 | 8 | 1 |
| Iceland | 2013 | 9 | 3 |
| Iceland | 2014 | 3 | 1 |
| Iceland | 2015 | 9 | 0 |
| Iceland | 2016 | 14 | 0 |
| Iceland | 2017 | 6 | 2 |
| Iceland | 2018 | 8 | 0 |
| Iceland | 2019 | 4 | 1 |
| Iceland | 2020 | 2 | 0 |
| Iceland | 2021 | 4 | 0 |
| Iceland | 2022 | 1 | 0 |
| Iceland | 2023 | 8 | 0 |
| Iceland | 2024 | 9 | 0 |
| Iceland | 2025 | 2 | 0 |
| Iceland | 2026 | 1 | 0 |
| Total | | 102 | 8 |

Scores and results list Iceland's goal tally first, score column indicates score after each Jóhann goal.

List of international goals scored by Jóhann Berg Guðmundsson
| No. | Date | Venue | Cap | Opponent | Score | Result | Competition | Ref. |
|---|---|---|---|---|---|---|---|---|
| 1 | 14 November 2012 | Estadi Comunal d'Andorra la Vella, Andorra la Vella, Andorra | 22 | Andorra | 1–0 | 2–0 | Friendly | |
| 2 | 6 September 2013 | Stade de Suisse, Bern, Switzerland | 26 | Switzerland | 1–0 | 4–4 | 2014 FIFA World Cup qualification | |
| 3 | 6 September 2013 | Stade de Suisse, Bern, Switzerland | 26 | Switzerland | 3–4 | 4–4 | 2014 FIFA World Cup qualification | |
| 4 | 6 September 2013 | Stade de Suisse, Bern, Switzerland | 26 | Switzerland | 4–4 | 4–4 | 2014 FIFA World Cup qualification | |
| 5 | 5 March 2014 | Cardiff City Stadium, Cardiff, Wales | 32 | Wales | 1–1 | 1–3 | Friendly | |
| 6 | 6 October 2017 | New Eskişehir Stadium, Eskişehir, Turkey | 61 | Turkey | 1–0 | 3–0 | 2018 FIFA World Cup qualification | |
| 7 | 9 October 2017 | Laugardalsvöllur, Reykjavík, Iceland | 62 | Kosovo | 2–0 | 2–0 | 2018 FIFA World Cup qualification | |
| 8 | 8 June 2019 | Laugardalsvöllur, Reykjavík, Iceland | 73 | Albania | 1–0 | 1–0 | UEFA Euro 2020 qualifying | |

== Honours ==
AZ

- KNVB Cup: 2012–13

Burnley

- EFL Championship: 2022–23
