= Mohannad Abu Taha =

Jordanian footballer

Personal information
- Full name: Mohannad Mahmoud Saleh Abu Taha
- Date of birth: 2 February 2003 (age 23)
- Place of birth: Amman, Jordan
- Height: 1.76 m (5 ft 9 in)
- Positions: Winger; left-back

Team information
- Current team: Neom
- Number: 6

Youth career
- –2021: Al-Wehdat

Senior career*
Years	Team	Apps	(Gls)
2021–2024	Al-Wehdat		
2024–2025	Al-Karkh	17	(2)
2025	→ Al-Orobah (loan)	16	(2)
2025–2026	Al-Quwa Al-Jawiya	31	(4)
2026–	Neom	6	(0)

International career^{‡}
2022–2023	Jordan U20	8	(5)
2021–	Jordan U23	21	(4)
2023–	Jordan	21	(1)
Medal record
Men's football
Representing Jordan
AFC Asian Cup
Runner-up	2023 Qatar	Team
FIFA Arab Cup
Runner-up	2025 Qatar	Team
- * Club domestic league appearances and goals as of 7 September 2026 ‡ National team caps and goals as of 15 December 2025

Mohannad Mahmoud Saleh Abu Taha (Arabic: مُهَنَّد مَحْمُود صَالِح أَبُو طٰهٰ; born 2 February 2003) is a Jordanian footballer who plays as a winger or left-back for Saudi Pro League club Neom, and the Jordan national team.

== Club career ==
=== Al-Wehdat ===
Born in Amman, Abu Taha is a youth product of Al-Wehdat. He was promoted to the first team in 2021 at the age of 18.

In January 2023, Abu Taha nearly joined the reserves team of Belgian Pro League side Gent on a 6-month loan deal with option to buy, but the deal was not completed because the transfer window closed before the player registered.

He had played an important role in the 2023–24 Jordan FA Cup, where he had scored one of the goals in the final against Al-Hussein. He was noted for having played at a variety of wing and central positions while at Al-Wehdat.

With his contract running out towards the end of the 2023–24 season, Abu Taha had refused a contract extension from Al-Wehdat, as he desired to play professionally abroad.

=== Al-Karkh ===
On 14 August 2024, Abu Taha was linked to join Iraq Stars League club Al-Karkh, which on 23 September 2024, he signed a deal to join the club for an undisclosed deal, as well as a one-year contract.

=== Al-Orobah ===
On 31 January 2025, Abu Taha joined Saudi Pro League club Al-Orobah on a six-month loan. By going on loan, he agreed with his parent club to sign a contract extension for an additional season.

=== Al-Quwa Al-Jawiya ===
On 10 August 2025, Abu Taha joined Al-Quwa Al-Jawiya from Al-Karkh.

== International career ==
On 17 October 2023, Abu Taha made his international debut with the Jordan national team against Iraq as part of the 2023 Jordan International Tournament third place match.

In January 2024, Abu Taha was included in Jordan's 26-men squad for the 2023 AFC Asian Cup.

== Statistics ==
=== Club ===
As of match played 3 November 2026

Appearances and goals by club, season and competition
Club	Season	League			National cup (Note: Includes Jordan FA Cup and King's Cup.)		League cup (Note: Includes Jordan Super Cup.)		Continental (Note: Includes AFC Champions League Elite, AFC Champions League Two, and Gulf Club Champions Cup.)		Total	
Club	Season	Division	Apps	Goals	Apps	Goals	Apps	Goals	Apps	Goals	Apps	Goals
Al-Wehdat	2022	Jordanian Pro League	?	8	5	2	—		2	1	7*	11
Al-Wehdat	2023–24	Jordanian Pro League	?	8	5	3	2	0	7	1	16*	10
Al-Wehdat	Total		?	16	10	5	2	0	9	2	23*	21
Al-Karkh	2024–25	Iraq Stars League	17	2	—		—		—		17	2
Al-Orobah (loan)	2024–25	Saudi Pro League	16	2	—		—		—		16	2
Al-Quwa Al-Jawiya	2025–26	Iraq Stars League	32	4	—		—		—		32	4
Al-Quwa Al-Jawiya	Total		65	6	0	0	0	0	0	0	65	6
Neom	2026–27	Saudi Pro League	11	0	1	0	—		3	0	17	0
Career total (Note: Informating regarding Abu Taha's apperences in the Jordanian Pro League is scarace.)			66*	22	11	5	2	0	14	2	105*	27

=== International goals ===
Scores and results list Jordan goal tally first.

No	Date	Venue	Opponent	Score	Result	Competition
1.	6 December 2025	Ahmad bin Ali Stadium, Al Rayyan, Qatar	Kuwait	1–0	3–1	2025 FIFA Arab Cup

== Style of play ==
A left-footed versatile player, Abu Taha is able to play both as a winger or left-back.

== Honours ==
Al-Wehdat

- Jordan FA Cup: 2022, 2023–24
- Jordan Super Cup: 2023

Al-Quwa Al-Jawiya

- Iraq Stars League: 2025–26

Jordan

- AFC Asian Cup runner-up: 2023
- FIFA Arab Cup runner-up: 2025

Jordan U23

- WAFF U-23 Championship: 2021
