= Ferid Ben Belgacem =

Tunisian football manager

Personal information
- Date of birth: 24 March 1960 (age 66)
- Place of birth: Tunisia

Managerial career
- Years: Team
- 2005–2006: EGS Gafsa
- 2007–2008: CA Bizertin
- 2008–2009: Stade Tunisien
- 2009–2010: Al-Shaab
- 2010–2011: EGS Gafsa
- 2011–2013: Tunisia (assistant)
- 2013: CS Hammam-Lif
- 2015: AS Gabès
- 2015–2016: Al-Orobah
- 2019: Tunisia U23
- 2021–2022: AS Rejiche
- 2024–2025: Najran

Ferid Ben Belgacem (Arabic: فَرِيد بْن بَلْقَاسِم; born 24 March 1960) is a Tunisian football manager.
