= Brad Young (footballer, born 2003) =

English footballer (born 2003)

Personal information
- Full name: Bradley Jamie Ethan Young
- Date of birth: 6 January 2003 (age 23)
- Place of birth: Solihull, England
- Height: 5 ft 9 in (1.76 m)
- Position: Forward

Team information
- Current team: The New Saints
- Number: 9

Youth career
- –2015: West Bromwich Albion
- 2017–2021: Aston Villa

Senior career*
Years	Team	Apps	(Gls)
2021–2023	Aston Villa	0	(0)
2021–2022	→ Carlisle United (loan)	14	(0)
2022–2023	→ Ayr United (loan)	11	(2)
2023–2024	The New Saints	25	(22)
2024–2025	Al-Orobah	16	(2)
2025–2026	Baniyas	4	(0)
2026	Caernarfon Town	10	(3)
2026–	The New Saints	11	(7)
- * Club domestic league appearances and goals as of 15:35, 5 November 2026 (UTC)

Bradley Jamie Ethan Young (born 6 January 2003) is an English professional footballer who plays as a forward for Cymru Premier club The New Saints.

Young is a product of the Aston Villa Academy, being part of the side that won the 2020-21 FA Youth Cup, he also spent time with West Bromwich Albion as a junior. He made one senior appearance for Aston Villa in the FA Cup in 2021 and played senior football on loan at Carlisle United and Ayr United before moving to The New Saints in 2023.

== Career ==
=== Aston Villa ===
Having been on the books of West Bromwich Albion before being released at age 12, he joined Aston Villa after a spell playing MJPL football for FDC academy and became a regular at U18 and then U23 level. He made his senior debut as a substitute in a 4–1 FA Cup defeat to Liverpool on 8 January 2021.

Young was a part of the Aston Villa team that won the 2020–21 FA Youth Cup - scoring a penalty in the 2–1 final victory over Liverpool U18s on 24 May 2021, he scored six goals across the tournament, only bettered by his teammate Carney Chukwuemeka's seven. On 7 July 2021, he was one of several young players who signed a new contract with Aston Villa.

On 16 August 2021, Young joined League Two team Carlisle United on a season-long loan. He made his football league debut the following day, as a substitute in a goalless draw against Port Vale. On 28 September 2021, he scored his first goals for Carlisle United - scoring twice in a 2–0 victory over Everton U21 in the EFL Trophy. Young returned to Aston Villa from his loan early on 4 January 2022, after the two clubs mutually agreed that Young would not be guaranteed enough playing time in the upcoming months.

On 1 September 2022, Young joined Scottish Championship club Ayr United on a season-long loan. Young scored his first professional league goal on 17 September, in a 3–2 defeat to Raith Rovers. On 17 January 2023, Young's loan was cut short and he returned to Aston Villa. On 16 June 2023, Young was released by Aston Villa.

=== The New Saints ===
In July 2023, Young had a trial with EFL League One club Exeter City, however the club opted against offering him a contract. He instead signed for Cymru Premier club The New Saints on 2 September 2023. On 8 September, Young made his debut for the club, coming off the bench to score in a 3–0 win over Hibernian U21 in the Scottish Challenge Cup. He made his Welsh league debut on 13 September, in a 0–0 draw against Bala Town. On 22 September, Young scored his first league goals for the club, scoring twice in a 5–1 away victory over Cardiff Metropolitan University.

On 21 October 2023, Young scored his first career hattrick in a 6–2 league victory over Barry Town United, meaning he had scored 9 goals in his first 10 games in Welsh football. On 20 January 2024, Young won the first senior trophy of his career, scoring a goal in a 5–1 victory over Swansea City U21s in the final of the Welsh League Cup. On 21 April 2024, The New Saints completed an unbeaten season to win the Cymru Premier. Young won the Cymru Premier Golden Boot despite joining the league one month into the season. On 9 June, Young was awarded the Cymru Premier Young Player of the Season award.

On 9 July 2024, Young scored two goals on his European debut, in a 3–0 UEFA Champions League first qualifying round first leg victory over Dečić.

=== Al-Orobah ===
On 2 September 2024, Young signed for newly-promoted Saudi Pro League club Al-Orobah. The fee of £190,000 plus potential future add-ons saw the record broken for the highest fee received by a Cymru Premier club. On 15 September 2024, Young made his debut for Al-Orobah as a substitute in a 3–3 draw against Al-Kholood. However, as of 6 January 2025 it was claimed by his former club that Al-Orobah had yet to pay the transfer fee. On 18 March 2025, FIFA announced that Al-Orobah were subject to a transfer ban after failing to pay the transfer fee owed, nor any of the interest that was owed due to them missing instalments.

=== Baniyas ===
On 17 July 2025, Young joined UAE Pro League club Baniyas on a free transfer following Al-Orobah's relegation from the Saudi Pro League.

=== Caernarfon Town ===
On 1 January 2026, Young returned to Wales, signing for Caernarfon Town. He made his debut for the club on 13 January, in 2–2 draw against Connah's Quay Nomads. Young got his first goal for Caernarfon in a 2–1 defeat to former club The New Saints on 20 February, before scoring a brace in a 3–0 victory over Colwyn Bay the following week. On 12 April 2026, Young featured in the Welsh Cup final, as Caernarfon beat Flint Town United 3–0 to win the cup for the first time in the club's history.

=== Return to The New Saints ===
On 29 May 2026, The New Saints announced they had reached an agreement to bring Young back to the club. The transfer would become official when the Cymru Premier transfer window re-opened on 16 June 2026.

== Personal life ==
Young was seriously injured in June 2020, at the age of 17, after being stabbed three times during a mugging in Elmdon Park, Solihull. Young was told that doctors were unsure he would survive the stabbing and later overheard doctors discussing the possibility that he would have to use a colostomy bag. He made a full recovery and was able to play again for the Aston Villa academy the following season.

== Career statistics ==
As of match played 23 October 2026

Appearances and goals by club, season and competition
Club	Season	League			National cup (Note: Includes FA Cup, Scottish Cup, Welsh Cup, King's Cup, President's Cup)		League cup (Note: Includes Scottish League Cup, Welsh League Cup, UAE League Cup)		Continental		Other		Total	
Club	Season	Division	Apps	Goals	Apps	Goals	Apps	Goals	Apps	Goals	Apps	Goals	Apps	Goals
Aston Villa	2020–21	Premier League	0	0	1	0	0	0	–		2 (Note: Appearance(s) in EFL Trophy)	0	3	0
Aston Villa	2021–22	Premier League	0	0	0	0	0	0	–		0	0	0	0
Aston Villa	2022–23	Premier League	0	0	0	0	0	0	–		1	0	1	0
Aston Villa	Total		0	0	1	0	0	0	0	0	3	0	4	0
Carlisle United (loan)	2021–22	League Two	14	0	2	1	0	0	–		4	2	20	3
Ayr United (loan)	2022−23	Scottish Championship	11	2	1	0	1	0	–		1 (Note: Appearances in Scottish Challenge Cup)	0	14	2
The New Saints	2023–24	Cymru Premier	25	22	3	3	2	1	–		5	5	35	29
The New Saints	2024–25	Cymru Premier	0	0	0	0	0	0	7 (Note: Four appearances and three goals in UEFA Champions League, two appearances in UEFA Europa League, one appearance in UEFA Conference League)	3	0	0	7	3
The New Saints	Total		25	22	3	3	2	1	7	3	5	5	42	32
Al-Orobah	2024–25	Saudi Pro League	16	2	1	0	–		–		–		17	2
Baniyas	2025–26	UAE Pro League	4	0	0	0	2	0	–		–		6	0
Caernarfon Town	2025–26	Cymru Premier	10	3	3	1	0	0	–		–		13	4
The New Saints	2026–27	Cymru Premier	10	7	0	0	0	0	0	0	–		10	7
Career total			90	36	11	5	5	1	7	3	13	7	126	50

== Honours ==
Aston Villa U18

- FA Youth Cup: 2020–21

The New Saints

- Cymru Premier: 2023–24
- Welsh League Cup: 2023–24

Caernarfon Town

- Welsh Cup: 2025–26

Individual

- Cymru Premier Player of the Month: January 2024
- Cymru Premier Golden Boot: 2023–24
- Cymru Premier Young Player of the Season: 2023–24
