= Ahmed Karenshi =

Saudi Arabian footballer

Personal information
- Full name: Ahmed Mohammed Karenshi
- Date of birth: August 19, 1988 (age 38)
- Place of birth: Saudi Arabia
- Height: 1.69 m (5 ft 7 in)
- Position: Midfielder

Youth career
- –2008: Al-Ahli

Senior career*
Years	Team	Apps	(Gls)
–2008	Al-Ahli		
2008–2012	Al-Ansar		
2012–2014	Al-Wehda		
2014–2015	Al-Taawoun	9	(0)
2015	Al-Wehda	0	(0)
2015–2016	Hajer	14	(0)
2016–2018	Al-Qadsiah	9	(0)
2018–2019	Jeddah	35	(2)
2019–2020	Al-Ain	26	(0)
2020–2021	Al-Bukiryah	29	(0)
2021–2023	Al-Riyadh		
2023–2024	Al-Orobah	27	(0)
2024–2025	Al-Faisaly	18	(0)
- * Club domestic league appearances and goals as of 20 September 2020

Ahmed Mohammed Karenshi (Arabic: أحمد محمد كرنشي; born 19 August 1988) is a Saudi Arabian professional footballer who plays as a midfielder.

== Career ==
On 12 October 2020, Karenshi joined Al-Bukiryah.

On 8 July 2023, Karenshi joined Al-Orobah.

On 16 July 2024, Karenshi joined Al-Faisaly.

== Honours ==
Al-Ain

- Saudi First Division third place: 2019–20 (Promotion to Pro League)

Al-Riyadh

- Saudi Second Division third place: 2021–22 (Promotion to Saudi First Division)
- Saudi First Division fourth place: 2022–23 (Promotion to Pro League)

Al-Orobah

- Saudi First Division runner-up: 2023–24
