= Mohammed Barnawi =

Saudi Arabian footballer (born 2005)

Personal information
- Full name: Mohammed Ali Mohammed Barnawi
- Date of birth: 7 August 2005 (age 21)
- Place of birth: Jeddah, Saudi Arabia
- Height: 1.79 m (5 ft 10 in)
- Position: Defender

Team information
- Current team: Al-Ittihad
- Number: 66

Youth career
- –2024: Al-Hilal

Senior career*
Years	Team	Apps	(Gls)
2024–2025	Al-Hilal	0	(0)
2024–2025	→ Al-Orobah (loan)	4	(0)
2025–	Al-Ittihad	3	(0)

International career
2022–2025	Saudi Arabia U20	20	(1)
2024–	Saudi Arabia U23	5	(0)
- * Club domestic league appearances and goals as of 21 August 2026

Mohammed Barnawi (Arabic: محمد برناوي; born 7 August 2005) is a Saudi Arabian football player who plays as a defender for Al-Ittihad.

== Club career ==
Barnawi started his career at the youth teams of Al-Hilal. On 18 July 2024, Barnawi joined side Al-Orobah on a one-year loan. On 3 June 2025, he moved to Al-Ittihad on a free transfer.
