= Hamed Al-Maqati =

Saudi Arabian footballer

Hamed Al-Maqati حامد المقاطي
Personal information
- Full name: Hamed Taleb Al-Maqati
- Date of birth: July 15, 1993 (age 33)
- Place of birth: Saudi Arabia
- Height: 1.74 m (5 ft 9 in)
- Positions: Full-back; midfielder

Team information
- Current team: Al-Orobah
- Number: 11

Youth career
- –2013: Al-Muzahimiyyah

Senior career*
Years	Team	Apps	(Gls)
2013–2015	Al-Muzahimiyyah		
2015–2017	Al-Diriyah		
2017–2020	Al-Hazem	28	(3)
2019	→ Al-Ain (loan)	13	(2)
2019–2020	→ Al-Ain (loan)	14	(0)
2020–2022	Al-Diriyah	73	(3)
2022–	Al-Orobah	62	(0)
- * Club domestic league appearances and goals as of 31 May 2024

Hamed Al-Maqati (Arabic: حامد المقاطي, born 5 July 1993) is a Saudi Arabian professional footballer who plays as a full-back or midfielder for Al-Orobah.

== Career ==
Al-Maqati started his career at Al-Muzahimiyyah. During the 2013–14 season, Al-Maqati helped Al-Muzahimiyyah win the Third Division title and earn promotion to the Second Division. On 8 August 2015, Al-Maqati left Al-Muzahimiyyah and joined Al-Diriyah. On 27 July 2017, Al-Maqati left Al-Diriyah and joined First Division side Al-Hazem. On 6 February 2019, Al-Maqati joined Al-Ain on a six-month loan. On 31 August 2019, Al-Maqati rejoined Al-Ain on a one-year loan. On 12 October 2020 Al-Maqati joined former club Al-Diriyah. On 1 July 2022, Al-Maqati joined Al-Orobah. On 16 July 2024, Al-Maqati renewed his contract with Al-Orobah for another two years.

== Honours ==
Al-Muzahimiyyah

- Third Division: 2013–14

Al-Hazem

- First Division League runners-up: 2017–18 (Promotion to Pro League)

Al-Ain

- First Division League third place: 2019–20 (Promotion to Pro League)

Al-Orobah

- First Division League runner-up: 2023–24 (Promotion to Pro League)
