= Rafea Al-Ruwaili =

Saudi Arabian footballer (born 1990)

Personal information
- Full name: Rafea Mohammed Al-Ruwaili
- Date of birth: July 5, 1990 (age 36)
- Place of birth: Saudi Arabia
- Height: 1.75 m (5 ft 9 in)
- Position: Goalkeeper

Team information
- Current team: Al-Orobah
- Number: 1

Youth career
- 2006–2010: Al-Orobah
- 2009: → Arar (loan)

Senior career*
Years	Team	Apps	(Gls)
2010–2018	Al-Orobah		
2018–2019	Arar		
2019–	Al-Orobah		
- * Club domestic league appearances and goals

Rafea Al-Ruwaili (Arabic: رافع الرويلي; born July 5, 1990) is a Saudi football player who plays as goalkeeper for Al-Orobah.
