= Fahad Al-Rashidi (footballer, born 1991) =

Saudi Arabian footballer

Personal information
- Full name: Fahad Meqbel Al-Rashidi
- Date of birth: June 8, 1991 (age 35)
- Place of birth: Saudi Arabia
- Height: 1.74 m (5 ft 9 in)
- Position: Midfielder

Team information
- Current team: Al-Orobah
- Number: 80

Youth career
- Al-Nassr

Senior career*
Years	Team	Apps	(Gls)
2009–2013	Al-Nassr	4	(0)
2013–2015	Al-Orobah	36	(0)
2015–2017	Al-Faisaly	3	(0)
2016–2017	→ Al-Orobah (loan)	26	(2)
2017–2018	Al-Raed	10	(0)
2018–2019	Al-Orobah	29	(0)
2019–2020	Al-Khaleej	21	(0)
2020–2021	Al-Jeel	26	(0)
2021–2024	Al-Riyadh		
2024–	Al-Orobah	0	(0)
- * Club domestic league appearances and goals

Fahad Meqbel Al-Rashidi (Arabic: فهد مقبل الرشيدي; born June 8, 1991) is a Saudi football player who plays a midfielder for Al-Orobah.

On 6 August 2024, Al-Rashidi joined Al-Orobah on a one-year deal.
