= Al-Orobah FC =

Association football club in Saudi Arabia

Al-Orobah
- Full name: Al Oroubah Football Club
- Founded: 1975; 51 years ago
- Ground: Al-Orobah Club Stadium
- Capacity: 7,000
- Owner: Badr bin Nawwaf bin Abdulaziz
- Chairman: Munis Al-Dhawi
- Head coach: Slavche Vojneski
- League: Saudi First Division
- 2025–26: 5th of 18
- Website: www.alorobahclub.sa
Home colours	Away colours

Al-Orobah FC (Arabic: نادي العروبة لكرة القدم, romanized: nādī al-oroubah li-kūrāt al-qādam, lit. 'Arabism Football Club') is a Saudi Arabian professional football club based in Sakakah, that will compete in the Saudi First Division.

== History ==
They won the 2012–13 Saudi First Division and were promoted to the Saudi Pro League, the top level of Saudi Arabian football for the first time in their history.

Al-Orobah achieved a milestone by earning promotion to the Saudi Pro League in the 2013–14 season, marking its first appearance in the top tier of Saudi football.

On 18 March 2025, Al-Orobah were subject to a ban on registration of new players by FIFA after they were found to have not paid $150,000 of transfer fees and 5% interest that were owed to Welsh club The New Saints after the transfer of Brad Young.

== Honours ==
- Saudi First Division League (tier 2)
  - Winners (1): 2012–13
- Saudi Second Division League (tier 3)
  - Winners (1): 2007–08
  - Runners-up (1): 1998–99, 2020–21
- Saudi Third Division (tier 4)
  - Winners (1): 1996–97

== Current squad ==
As of 7 September 2026

Note: Flags indicate national team as defined under FIFA eligibility rules; some limited exceptions apply. Players may hold more than one non-FIFA nationality.

No.	Pos.	Nation	Player
1	GK	KSA	Rafea Al-Ruwaili
4	DF	KSA	Ziyad Al-Hunaiti
5	MF	KSA	Mohammed Krishan
6	MF	KSA	Abdulaziz Al-Harabi
8	MF	JOR	Khaled Zakaria
9	FW	SEN	Famara Diédhiou
11	DF	KSA	Hamed Al-Maqati
14	MF	KSA	Mohammed Al-Mohaini
16	FW	KSA	Faris Al-Zubaidi
17	MF	KSA	Rayan Al-Hazmi
18	MF	KSA	Farraj Al-Rashed
19	FW	KSA	Omar Al-Sharari
20	FW	KSA	Abdullah Abalkhail
22	GK	KSA	Saud Al-Ruwaili
24	DF	KSA	Loay Al-Shahrani
26	GK	KSA	Hatem Al-Johani

No.	Pos.	Nation	Player
27	DF	KSA	Rabee Hawsawi
28	MF	KSA	Qassem Al Hussain
40	DF	KSA	Khalid Al-Dali
41	DF	KSA	Osama Al-Rashed
42	DF	KSA	Raed Faraj
43	DF	KSA	Mohammed Al-Hassani
44	MF	KSA	Abdullah Al-Ruwaili
45	DF	KSA	Ibrahim Al-Shallaqi
47	MF	KSA	Sanad Al-Ruwaili
49	MF	KSA	Rashed Al-Lehyani
50	FW	SDN	Mohammed Nizar
66	DF	KSA	Ali Al-Sultan
80	MF	KSA	Fahad Al-Rashidi
99	FW	KSA	Hassan Al-Solan
—	MF	KSA	Hassan Al Eid

== Notable players ==
- (Ivory Coast) Ben Badi
- (Saudi Arabia) Abdulmajeed Al-Ruwaili

== Coaching staff ==
Position	Name
Head coach	(North Macedonia) Slavche Vojneski
Assistant coach	(North Macedonia) Filip Despotovski (Saudi Arabia) Mohammed Al-Sharari
Goalkeeping coach	(Saudi Arabia) Talal Rajih
Conditioning coach	(North Macedonia) Sashko Poposki
Video analyst	(Saudi Arabia) Hussain Barnawi
Head of medical	(Saudi Arabia) Nawwaf Al-Ismaili
Team doctor	(Saudi Arabia) Ibrahim Al-Qahtani
Physiotherapist	(Saudi Arabia) Turki Al-Bulaihi
Masseur	(Saudi Arabia) Saud Al-Ghanim
Sports scientist	(Saudi Arabia) Abdullah Al-Marzouq
Nutritionist	(Saudi Arabia) Faiz Al-Suleiman
Performance director	(Saudi Arabia) Mohammed Al-Yusuf
Technical director	(Saudi Arabia) Salman Al-Kaabi

== Managerial history ==
- (Tunisia) Ahmed Barhoumi (1997 – 1999)
- (Tunisia) Ahmad Al-Ajlani (17 July 1999 – 1 May 2000)
- (Tunisia) Hamda Tiouiri (17 July 2000 – 30 November 2000)
- (Saudi Arabia) Mohammed Al-Najdi (30 November 2000 – 15 April 2001)
- (Egypt) Mimi Abdel Razek (23 June 2001 – 25 November 2001)
- (Saudi Arabia) Mohammed Al-Najdi (caretaker) (25 November 2001 – 5 December 2001)
- (Tunisia) Nasser Nefzi (5 December 2001 – 15 January 2002)
- (Saudi Arabia) Mohammed Al-Najdi (15 January 2002 – 1 May 2002)
- (Tunisia) Ahmed Barhoumi (1 July 2002 – 25 February 2003)
- (Egypt) Mohamad Kenawi (25 February 2003 – 1 May 2003)
- (Tunisia) Zouhair Louati (1 July 2003 – 10 April 2004)
- (Saudi Arabia) Hamoud Al-Rughayan (1 July 2004 – 1 April 2005)
- (Tunisia) Abdelwahab Elharaby (15 September 2005 – 23 January 2006)
- (Tunisia) Moncef Mcharek (7 October 2006 – 22 December 2008)
- (Tunisia) Moncef Chargui (22 December 2008 – 28 February 2009)
- (Tunisia) Makram Abdullah (28 February 2009 – 8 May 2009)
- (Tunisia) Najib Khouaja (29 May 2009 – 27 December 2009)
- (Tunisia) Anis Zorgati (27 December 2009 – 30 April 2010)
- (Tunisia) Makram Abdullah (23 May 2010 – 12 December 2010)
- (Tunisia) Abdelkader Ben Hassen (1 July 2011 – 19 February 2012)
- (Tunisia) Makram Abdullah (22 February 2012 – 30 May 2012)
- (Egypt) Salah El Nahy (13 June 2012 – 20 October 2012)
- (Tunisia) Djamel Belkacem (22 October 2012 – 22 May 2014)
- (France) Laurent Banide (25 May 2014 – 17 December 2014)
- (Tunisia) Sofiane Kassabi (caretaker) (17 December 2014 – 2 January 2015)
- (Romania) Valeriu Tița (2 January 2015 – 7 April 2015)
- (Egypt) Amro Anwar (7 April 2015 – 30 May 2015)
- (Tunisia) Hadi Ben Mokhtar (2 July 2015 – 20 September 2015)
- (Tunisia) Ferid Ben Belgacem (20 September 2015 – 8 March 2016)
- (Saudi Arabia) Sameer Hilal (9 March 2016 – 1 May 2016)
- (Tunisia) Lotfi Jbara (29 June 2016 – 15 October 2016)
- (Tunisia) Makram Abdullah (15 October 2016 – 10 January 2017)
- (Tunisia) Mejdi Khouildi (caretaker) (10 January 2017 – 24 January 2017)
- (Tunisia) Fouad Bouali (24 January 2017 – 24 March 2017)
- (Tunisia) Bayrem Mokhtari (24 March 2017 – 1 June 2018)
- (Tunisia) Makram Abdullah (7 June 2018 – 30 October 2018)
- (Senegal) Sadio Demba (30 October 2018 – 2 February 2019)
- (Tunisia) Ferid Ben Belgacem (2 February 2019 – 22 February 2019)
- (Tunisia) Bayrem Mokhtari (22 February 2019 – 27 October 2019)
- (Tunisia) Karim Zouaghi (9 November 2019 – 14 March 2020)
- (Saudi Arabia) Mohammed Al-Sharari (caretaker) (11 July 2020 – 4 September 2020)
- (Tunisia) Ameur Derbal (19 September 2020 – 19 November 2021)
- (Tunisia) Djamel Belkacem (19 November 2021 – 1 June 2022)
- (Portugal) Quim Machado (6 June 2022 – 1 June 2023)
- (Bosnia and Herzegovina) Rusmir Cviko (20 June 2023 – 1 June 2024)
- (Portugal) Álvaro Pacheco (21 July 2024 – 2 January 2025)
- (Saudi Arabia) Mohammed Al-Sharari (caretaker) (2 January 2025 – 10 January 2025)
- (Iraq) Adnan Hamad (10 January 2025 – 28 April 2025)
- (Spain) Antonio Cazorla (1 May 2025 – 1 June 2025)
- (North Macedonia) Slavche Vojneski (1 August 2025 – )

== See also ==
- List of football clubs in Saudi Arabia
