= 1998 FIFA World Cup squads =

The 1998 FIFA World Cup was the 16th FIFA World Cup, a quadrennial football tournament contested by the senior men's teams of the national associations affiliated to FIFA (the International Federation of Association Football). The tournament was played in France from 10 June to 12 July 1998 and featured 32 teams divided into eight groups of four. Each team was required to submit a squad of 22 players – numbered sequentially from 1 to 22 – from whom they would select their teams for each match at the tournament, with the final squads to be submitted by 1 June 1998. In total, 704 players were selected for the tournament.

It featured players born in four decades, the 1950s, the 1960s, the 1970s and the 1980s. The only other times this has happened at a World Cup was in the 1958, 1970 and 1990 editions.

Players' ages as of 10 June 1998, the tournament's opening day.

== Group A ==
=== Brazil ===
Head coach: Mário Zagallo

| No. | Pos. | Player | Date of birth (age) | Caps | Club |
|---|---|---|---|---|---|
| 1 | GK | Cláudio Taffarel | 8 May 1966 (aged 32) | 94 | (Brazil) Atlético Mineiro |
| 2 | DF | Cafu | 7 June 1970 (aged 28) | 64 | (Italy) Roma |
| 3 | DF | Aldair | 30 November 1965 (aged 32) | 66 | (Italy) Roma |
| 4 | DF | Júnior Baiano | 14 March 1970 (aged 28) | 17 | (Brazil) Flamengo |
| 5 | MF | César Sampaio | 31 March 1968 (aged 30) | 34 | (Japan) Yokohama Flügels |
| 6 | DF | Roberto Carlos | 10 April 1973 (aged 25) | 46 | (Spain) Real Madrid |
| 7 | MF | Giovanni | 4 February 1972 (aged 26) | 14 | (Spain) Barcelona |
| 8 | MF | Dunga (captain) | 31 October 1963 (aged 34) | 84 | (Japan) Júbilo Iwata |
| 9 | FW | Ronaldo | 22 September 1976 (aged 21) | 37 | (Italy) Inter Milan |
| 10 | MF | Rivaldo | 19 April 1972 (aged 26) | 15 | (Spain) Barcelona |
| 11 | MF | Emerson | 4 April 1976 (aged 22) | 3 | (Germany) Bayer Leverkusen |
| 12 | GK | Carlos Germano | 14 August 1970 (aged 27) | 9 | (Brazil) Vasco da Gama |
| 13 | DF | Zé Carlos | 14 November 1968 (aged 29) | 0 | (Brazil) São Paulo |
| 14 | DF | Marcelo Gonçalves | 22 February 1966 (aged 32) | 22 | (Brazil) Botafogo |
| 15 | DF | André Cruz | 20 September 1968 (aged 29) | 31 | (Italy) Milan |
| 16 | MF | Zé Roberto | 6 July 1974 (aged 23) | 20 | (Brazil) Flamengo |
| 17 | MF | Doriva | 28 May 1972 (aged 26) | 11 | (Portugal) Porto |
| 18 | MF | Leonardo | 5 September 1969 (aged 28) | 45 | (Italy) Milan |
| 19 | MF | Denílson | 24 August 1977 (aged 20) | 26 | (Brazil) São Paulo |
| 20 | FW | Bebeto | 16 February 1964 (aged 34) | 68 | (Brazil) Botafogo |
| 21 | FW | Edmundo | 2 April 1971 (aged 27) | 33 | (Italy) Fiorentina |
| 22 | GK | Dida | 7 October 1973 (aged 24) | 15 | (Brazil) Cruzeiro |

=== Morocco ===
Head coach: (France) Henri Michel

| No. | Pos. | Player | Date of birth (age) | Caps | Club |
|---|---|---|---|---|---|
| 1 | GK | Abdelkader El Brazi | 5 November 1964 (aged 33) | 37 | (Morocco) FAR Rabat |
| 2 | DF | Abdelilah Saber | 21 April 1974 (aged 24) | 25 | (Portugal) Sporting CP |
| 3 | DF | Abdelkrim El Hadrioui | 6 March 1972 (aged 26) | 59 | (Portugal) Benfica |
| 4 | DF | Youssef Rossi | 28 June 1973 (aged 24) | 20 | (France) Rennes |
| 5 | DF | Smahi Triki | 1 August 1967 (aged 30) | 16 | (Switzerland) Lausanne |
| 6 | DF | Noureddine Naybet (captain) | 10 February 1970 (aged 28) | 91 | (Spain) Deportivo La Coruña |
| 7 | MF | Mustapha Hadji | 16 November 1971 (aged 26) | 42 | (Spain) Deportivo La Coruña |
| 8 | MF | Saïd Chiba | 18 September 1970 (aged 27) | 23 | (Spain) Compostela |
| 9 | FW | Abdeljalil Hadda | 21 March 1972 (aged 26) | 11 | (Tunisia) Club Africain |
| 10 | FW | Abderrahim Ouakili | 11 December 1970 (aged 27) | 8 | (Germany) 1860 Munich |
| 11 | MF | Ali Elkhattabi | 17 January 1977 (aged 21) | 6 | (Netherlands) Heerenveen |
| 12 | GK | Driss Benzekri | 31 December 1970 (aged 27) | 6 | (Morocco) RS Settat |
| 13 | DF | Rachid Neqrouz | 10 April 1972 (aged 26) | 13 | (Italy) Bari |
| 14 | FW | Salaheddine Bassir | 5 September 1972 (aged 25) | 26 | (Spain) Deportivo La Coruña |
| 15 | DF | Lahcen Abrami | 31 December 1969 (aged 28) | 41 | (Morocco) Wydad Casablanca |
| 16 | MF | Rachid Azzouzi | 10 January 1971 (aged 27) | 35 | (Germany) Greuther Fürth |
| 17 | MF | Gharib Amzine | 3 May 1973 (aged 25) | 2 | (France) Mulhouse |
| 18 | MF | Youssef Chippo | 10 May 1973 (aged 25) | 20 | (Portugal) Porto |
| 19 | DF | Jamal Sellami | 6 October 1970 (aged 27) | 0 | (Morocco) Raja Casablanca |
| 20 | DF | Tahar El Khalej | 16 June 1968 (aged 29) | 54 | (Portugal) Benfica |
| 21 | FW | Rachid Rokki | 8 November 1974 (aged 23) | 2 | (Morocco) Chabab Mohammédia |
| 22 | GK | Mustapha Chadili | 14 February 1973 (aged 25) | 0 | (Morocco) Raja Casablanca |

=== Norway ===
Head coach: Egil Olsen

| No. | Pos. | Player | Date of birth (age) | Caps | Club |
|---|---|---|---|---|---|
| 1 | GK | Frode Grodås (captain) | 24 October 1964 (aged 33) | 39 | (England) Tottenham Hotspur |
| 2 | DF | Gunnar Halle | 11 August 1965 (aged 32) | 60 | (England) Leeds United |
| 3 | DF | Ronny Johnsen | 10 June 1969 (aged 29) | 33 | (England) Manchester United |
| 4 | DF | Henning Berg | 1 September 1969 (aged 28) | 52 | (England) Manchester United |
| 5 | DF | Stig Inge Bjørnebye | 11 December 1969 (aged 28) | 62 | (England) Liverpool |
| 6 | MF | Ståle Solbakken | 27 February 1968 (aged 30) | 34 | (Denmark) AaB |
| 7 | MF | Erik Mykland | 21 July 1971 (aged 26) | 54 | (Greece) Panathinaikos |
| 8 | MF | Øyvind Leonhardsen | 17 August 1970 (aged 27) | 55 | (England) Liverpool |
| 9 | FW | Tore André Flo | 15 June 1973 (aged 24) | 25 | (England) Chelsea |
| 10 | MF | Kjetil Rekdal | 6 November 1968 (aged 29) | 66 | (Germany) Hertha BSC |
| 11 | MF | Mini Jakobsen | 8 November 1965 (aged 32) | 64 | (Norway) Rosenborg |
| 12 | GK | Thomas Myhre | 16 October 1973 (aged 24) | 1 | (England) Everton |
| 13 | GK | Espen Baardsen | 7 December 1977 (aged 20) | 1 | (England) Tottenham Hotspur |
| 14 | DF | Vegard Heggem | 13 July 1975 (aged 22) | 1 | (Norway) Rosenborg |
| 15 | DF | Dan Eggen | 13 January 1970 (aged 28) | 13 | (Spain) Celta Vigo |
| 16 | FW | Jostein Flo | 3 October 1964 (aged 33) | 44 | (Norway) Strømsgodset |
| 17 | FW | Håvard Flo | 4 April 1970 (aged 28) | 9 | (Germany) Werder Bremen |
| 18 | FW | Egil Østenstad | 2 January 1972 (aged 26) | 14 | (England) Southampton |
| 19 | DF | Erik Hoftun | 3 March 1969 (aged 29) | 1 | (Norway) Rosenborg |
| 20 | FW | Ole Gunnar Solskjær | 26 February 1973 (aged 25) | 14 | (England) Manchester United |
| 21 | DF | Vidar Riseth | 21 April 1972 (aged 26) | 4 | (Austria) LASK |
| 22 | MF | Roar Strand | 2 February 1970 (aged 28) | 5 | (Norway) Rosenborg |

=== Scotland ===
Head coach: Craig Brown

| No. | Pos. | Player | Date of birth (age) | Caps | Club |
|---|---|---|---|---|---|
| 1 | GK | Jim Leighton | 24 July 1958 (aged 39) | 86 | (Scotland) Aberdeen |
| 2 | MF | Jackie McNamara | 24 October 1973 (aged 24) | 6 | (Scotland) Celtic |
| 3 | DF | Tom Boyd | 24 November 1965 (aged 32) | 55 | (Scotland) Celtic |
| 4 | DF | Colin Calderwood | 20 January 1965 (aged 33) | 28 | (England) Tottenham Hotspur |
| 5 | DF | Colin Hendry (captain) | 7 December 1965 (aged 32) | 32 | (England) Blackburn Rovers |
| 6 | DF | Tosh McKinlay | 3 December 1964 (aged 33) | 19 | (Scotland) Celtic |
| 7 | FW | Kevin Gallacher | 23 November 1966 (aged 31) | 36 | (England) Blackburn Rovers |
| 8 | MF | Craig Burley | 24 September 1971 (aged 26) | 25 | (Scotland) Celtic |
| 9 | FW | Gordon Durie | 6 December 1965 (aged 32) | 40 | (Scotland) Rangers |
| 10 | FW | Darren Jackson | 25 July 1966 (aged 31) | 24 | (Scotland) Celtic |
| 11 | MF | John Collins | 31 January 1968 (aged 30) | 49 | (France) Monaco |
| 12 | GK | Neil Sullivan | 24 February 1970 (aged 28) | 3 | (England) Wimbledon |
| 13 | FW | Simon Donnelly | 1 December 1974 (aged 23) | 8 | (Scotland) Celtic |
| 14 | MF | Paul Lambert | 7 August 1969 (aged 28) | 12 | (Scotland) Celtic |
| 15 | MF | Scot Gemmill | 2 January 1971 (aged 27) | 13 | (England) Nottingham Forest |
| 16 | DF | David Weir | 10 May 1970 (aged 28) | 5 | (Scotland) Heart of Midlothian |
| 17 | MF | Billy McKinlay | 22 April 1969 (aged 29) | 25 | (England) Blackburn Rovers |
| 18 | DF | Matt Elliott | 1 November 1968 (aged 29) | 3 | (England) Leicester City |
| 19 | DF | Derek Whyte | 31 August 1968 (aged 29) | 11 | (Scotland) Aberdeen |
| 20 | FW | Scott Booth | 16 December 1971 (aged 26) | 16 | (Netherlands) FC Utrecht |
| 21 | GK | Jonathan Gould | 18 July 1968 (aged 29) | 0 | (Scotland) Celtic |
| 22 | DF | Christian Dailly | 23 October 1973 (aged 24) | 10 | (England) Derby County |

== Group B ==
=== Austria ===
Head coach: Herbert Prohaska

| No. | Pos. | Player | Date of birth (age) | Caps | Club |
|---|---|---|---|---|---|
| 1 | GK | Michael Konsel | 6 March 1962 (aged 36) | 40 | (Italy) Roma |
| 2 | MF | Markus Schopp | 22 February 1974 (aged 24) | 18 | (Austria) Sturm Graz |
| 3 | DF | Peter Schöttel | 26 March 1967 (aged 31) | 54 | (Austria) Rapid Wien |
| 4 | DF | Anton Pfeffer | 17 August 1965 (aged 32) | 56 | Austria Wien |
| 5 | DF | Wolfgang Feiersinger | 30 January 1965 (aged 33) | 39 | (Germany) Borussia Dortmund |
| 6 | DF | Walter Kogler | 12 December 1967 (aged 30) | 22 | (France) Cannes |
| 7 | FW | Mario Haas | 16 September 1974 (aged 23) | 5 | (Austria) Sturm Graz |
| 8 | MF | Heimo Pfeifenberger | 29 December 1966 (aged 31) | 37 | (Germany) Werder Bremen |
| 9 | FW | Ivica Vastić | 29 September 1969 (aged 28) | 14 | (Austria) Sturm Graz |
| 10 | MF | Andi Herzog | 10 September 1968 (aged 29) | 68 | (Germany) Werder Bremen |
| 11 | MF | Martin Amerhauser | 23 July 1974 (aged 23) | 2 | Austria Salzburg |
| 12 | DF | Martin Hiden | 11 March 1973 (aged 25) | 4 | (England) Leeds United |
| 13 | MF | Harald Cerny | 13 September 1973 (aged 24) | 23 | (Germany) 1860 Munich |
| 14 | FW | Hannes Reinmayr | 23 August 1969 (aged 28) | 8 | (Austria) Sturm Graz |
| 15 | MF | Arnold Wetl | 2 February 1970 (aged 28) | 15 | (Austria) Rapid Wien |
| 16 | GK | Franz Wohlfahrt | 1 July 1964 (aged 33) | 37 | (Germany) VfB Stuttgart |
| 17 | MF | Roman Mählich | 17 September 1971 (aged 26) | 10 | (Austria) Sturm Graz |
| 18 | MF | Peter Stöger | 11 April 1966 (aged 32) | 59 | (Austria) LASK |
| 19 | FW | Toni Polster (captain) | 10 March 1964 (aged 34) | 91 | (Germany) 1. FC Köln |
| 20 | MF | Andreas Heraf | 10 September 1967 (aged 30) | 10 | (Austria) Rapid Wien |
| 21 | GK | Wolfgang Knaller | 9 October 1961 (aged 36) | 4 | Austria Wien |
| 22 | MF | Dietmar Kühbauer | 4 April 1971 (aged 27) | 28 | (Spain) Real Sociedad |

=== Cameroon ===
Head coach: (France) Claude Le Roy

| No. | Pos. | Player | Date of birth (age) | Caps | Club |
|---|---|---|---|---|---|
| 1 | GK | Jacques Songo'o | 17 March 1964 (aged 34) | 73 | (Spain) Deportivo La Coruña |
| 2 | DF | Joseph Elanga | 2 May 1979 (aged 19) | 1 | (Cameroon) Tonnerre Yaoundé |
| 3 | DF | Pierre Womé | 26 March 1979 (aged 19) | 28 | (Italy) Lucchese |
| 4 | DF | Rigobert Song | 1 July 1976 (aged 21) | 30 | (France) Metz |
| 5 | DF | Raymond Kalla | 22 April 1975 (aged 23) | 28 | (Greece) Panachaiki |
| 6 | DF | Pierre Njanka | 15 March 1975 (aged 23) | 2 | (Cameroon) Olympic Mvolyé |
| 7 | FW | François Omam-Biyik (captain) | 21 May 1966 (aged 32) | 70 | (Italy) Sampdoria |
| 8 | MF | Didier Angibeaud | 8 October 1974 (aged 23) | 3 | (France) Nice |
| 9 | FW | Alphonse Tchami | 14 September 1971 (aged 26) | 38 | (Germany) Hertha BSC |
| 10 | FW | Patrick Mboma | 15 November 1970 (aged 27) | 15 | (Japan) Gamba Osaka |
| 11 | FW | Samuel Eto'o | 10 March 1981 (aged 17) | 6 | (Spain) Leganés |
| 12 | DF | Lauren | 19 January 1977 (aged 21) | 1 | (Spain) Levante |
| 13 | DF | Patrice Abanda | 3 August 1978 (aged 19) | 1 | (Cameroon) Tonnerre Yaoundé |
| 14 | MF | Augustine Simo | 18 September 1978 (aged 19) | 14 | (France) Saint-Étienne |
| 15 | MF | Joseph Ndo | 28 April 1976 (aged 22) | 2 | (Cameroon) Coton Sport |
| 16 | GK | William Andem | 14 June 1968 (aged 29) | 16 | (Portugal) Boavista |
| 17 | DF | Michel Pensée | 16 June 1973 (aged 24) | 2 | (South Korea) Cheonan Ilhwa Chunma |
| 18 | FW | Samuel Ipoua | 1 March 1973 (aged 25) | 7 | (Austria) Rapid Wien |
| 19 | MF | Marcel Mahouvé | 16 January 1973 (aged 25) | 12 | (France) Montpellier |
| 20 | MF | Salomon Olembé | 8 December 1980 (aged 17) | 8 | (France) Nantes |
| 21 | FW | Joseph-Désiré Job | 1 December 1977 (aged 20) | 11 | (France) Lyon |
| 22 | GK | Alioum Boukar | 3 January 1972 (aged 26) | 16 | (Turkey) Samsunspor |

=== Chile ===
Head coach: (Uruguay) Nelson Acosta

| No. | Pos. | Player | Date of birth (age) | Caps | Club |
|---|---|---|---|---|---|
| 1 | GK | Nelson Tapia | 22 September 1966 (aged 31) | 34 | (Chile) Universidad Católica |
| 2 | DF | Cristián Castañeda | 18 September 1968 (aged 29) | 24 | Universidad de Chile |
| 3 | DF | Ronald Fuentes | 22 June 1969 (aged 28) | 41 | Universidad de Chile |
| 4 | DF | Francisco Rojas | 22 July 1974 (aged 23) | 12 | (Chile) Colo-Colo |
| 5 | DF | Javier Margas | 10 May 1969 (aged 29) | 52 | (Chile) Universidad Católica |
| 6 | DF | Pedro Reyes | 13 November 1972 (aged 25) | 24 | (Chile) Colo-Colo |
| 7 | MF | Nelson Parraguez | 5 April 1971 (aged 27) | 37 | (Chile) Universidad Católica |
| 8 | MF | Clarence Acuña | 8 February 1975 (aged 23) | 28 | Universidad de Chile |
| 9 | FW | Iván Zamorano (captain) | 18 January 1967 (aged 31) | 42 | (Italy) Inter Milan |
| 10 | MF | José Luis Sierra | 5 December 1968 (aged 29) | 31 | (Chile) Colo-Colo |
| 11 | FW | Marcelo Salas | 24 December 1974 (aged 23) | 39 | (Argentina) River Plate |
| 12 | GK | Marcelo Ramírez | 29 May 1965 (aged 33) | 19 | (Chile) Colo-Colo |
| 13 | FW | Manuel Neira | 12 October 1977 (aged 20) | 5 | (Chile) Colo-Colo |
| 14 | DF | Miguel Ramírez | 11 June 1970 (aged 27) | 38 | (Chile) Universidad Católica |
| 15 | DF | Moisés Villarroel | 12 February 1976 (aged 22) | 10 | (Chile) Santiago Wanderers |
| 16 | DF | Mauricio Aros | 9 March 1976 (aged 22) | 4 | Universidad de Chile |
| 17 | MF | Marcelo Vega | 12 August 1971 (aged 26) | 29 | (United States) MetroStars |
| 18 | MF | Luis Musrri | 24 December 1969 (aged 28) | 27 | Universidad de Chile |
| 19 | MF | Fernando Cornejo | 28 January 1969 (aged 29) | 27 | (Chile) Universidad Católica |
| 20 | MF | Fabián Estay | 5 October 1968 (aged 29) | 48 | (Mexico) Toluca |
| 21 | FW | Rodrigo Barrera | 30 March 1970 (aged 28) | 22 | Universidad de Chile |
| 22 | GK | Carlos Tejas | 4 October 1974 (aged 23) | 0 | (Chile) Coquimbo Unido |

=== Italy ===
Head coach: Cesare Maldini

| No. | Pos. | Player | Date of birth (age) | Caps | Club |
|---|---|---|---|---|---|
| 1 | GK | Francesco Toldo | 2 December 1971 (aged 26) | 6 | (Italy) Fiorentina |
| 2 | DF | Giuseppe Bergomi | 22 December 1963 (aged 34) | 78 | (Italy) Inter Milan |
| 3 | DF | Paolo Maldini (captain) | 26 June 1968 (aged 29) | 88 | (Italy) Milan |
| 4 | DF | Fabio Cannavaro | 13 September 1973 (aged 24) | 14 | (Italy) Parma |
| 5 | DF | Alessandro Costacurta | 24 April 1966 (aged 32) | 54 | (Italy) Milan |
| 6 | DF | Alessandro Nesta | 19 March 1976 (aged 22) | 12 | (Italy) Lazio |
| 7 | DF | Gianluca Pessotto | 11 August 1970 (aged 27) | 4 | (Italy) Juventus |
| 8 | DF | Moreno Torricelli | 23 January 1970 (aged 28) | 6 | (Italy) Juventus |
| 9 | MF | Demetrio Albertini | 23 August 1971 (aged 26) | 57 | (Italy) Milan |
| 10 | FW | Alessandro Del Piero | 9 November 1974 (aged 23) | 19 | (Italy) Juventus |
| 11 | MF | Dino Baggio | 24 July 1971 (aged 26) | 46 | (Italy) Parma |
| 12 | GK | Gianluca Pagliuca | 18 December 1966 (aged 31) | 34 | (Italy) Inter Milan |
| 13 | MF | Sandro Cois | 9 June 1972 (aged 26) | 1 | (Italy) Fiorentina |
| 14 | MF | Luigi Di Biagio | 3 June 1971 (aged 27) | 13 | (Italy) Roma |
| 15 | MF | Angelo Di Livio | 26 July 1966 (aged 31) | 21 | (Italy) Juventus |
| 16 | MF | Roberto Di Matteo | 29 May 1970 (aged 28) | 32 | (England) Chelsea |
| 17 | MF | Francesco Moriero | 31 March 1969 (aged 29) | 3 | (Italy) Inter Milan |
| 18 | FW | Roberto Baggio | 18 February 1967 (aged 31) | 48 | (Italy) Bologna |
| 19 | FW | Filippo Inzaghi | 9 August 1973 (aged 24) | 4 | (Italy) Juventus |
| 20 | FW | Enrico Chiesa | 29 December 1970 (aged 27) | 6 | (Italy) Parma |
| 21 | FW | Christian Vieri | 12 July 1973 (aged 24) | 8 | (Spain) Atlético Madrid |
| 22 | GK | Gianluigi Buffon | 28 January 1978 (aged 20) | 2 | (Italy) Parma |

== Group C ==
=== Denmark ===
Head coach: (Sweden) Bo Johansson

| No. | Pos. | Player | Date of birth (age) | Caps | Club |
|---|---|---|---|---|---|
| 1 | GK | Peter Schmeichel | 18 November 1963 (aged 34) | 100 | (England) Manchester United |
| 2 | DF | Michael Schjønberg | 19 January 1967 (aged 31) | 28 | (Germany) Kaiserslautern |
| 3 | DF | Marc Rieper | 5 June 1968 (aged 30) | 53 | (Scotland) Celtic |
| 4 | DF | Jes Høgh | 7 May 1966 (aged 32) | 37 | (Turkey) Fenerbahçe |
| 5 | DF | Jan Heintze | 17 August 1963 (aged 34) | 39 | (Germany) Bayer Leverkusen |
| 6 | DF | Thomas Helveg | 24 June 1971 (aged 26) | 30 | (Italy) Udinese |
| 7 | MF | Allan Nielsen | 13 March 1971 (aged 27) | 18 | (England) Tottenham Hotspur |
| 8 | MF | Per Frandsen | 6 February 1970 (aged 28) | 12 | (England) Bolton Wanderers |
| 9 | FW | Miklos Molnar | 10 April 1970 (aged 28) | 9 | (Spain) Sevilla |
| 10 | MF | Michael Laudrup (captain) | 15 June 1964 (aged 33) | 99 | (Netherlands) Ajax |
| 11 | FW | Brian Laudrup | 22 February 1969 (aged 29) | 77 | (Scotland) Rangers |
| 12 | DF | Søren Colding | 2 September 1972 (aged 25) | 4 | (Denmark) Brøndby |
| 13 | DF | Jacob Laursen | 6 October 1971 (aged 26) | 22 | (England) Derby County |
| 14 | MF | Morten Wieghorst | 25 February 1971 (aged 27) | 11 | (Scotland) Celtic |
| 15 | MF | Stig Tøfting | 14 August 1969 (aged 28) | 4 | (Germany) Duisburg |
| 16 | GK | Mogens Krogh | 31 October 1963 (aged 34) | 8 | (Denmark) Brøndby |
| 17 | MF | Bjarne Goldbæk | 6 October 1968 (aged 29) | 11 | (Denmark) Copenhagen |
| 18 | FW | Peter Møller | 23 March 1972 (aged 26) | 11 | (Netherlands) PSV Eindhoven |
| 19 | FW | Ebbe Sand | 19 July 1972 (aged 25) | 2 | (Denmark) Brøndby |
| 20 | DF | René Henriksen | 27 August 1969 (aged 28) | 2 | (Denmark) AB |
| 21 | MF | Martin Jørgensen | 6 October 1975 (aged 22) | 4 | (Italy) Udinese |
| 22 | GK | Peter Kjær | 5 November 1965 (aged 32) | 0 | (Denmark) Silkeborg |

=== France ===
Head coach: Aimé Jacquet

| No. | Pos. | Player | Date of birth (age) | Caps | Club |
|---|---|---|---|---|---|
| 1 | GK | Bernard Lama | 7 April 1963 (aged 35) | 37 | (England) West Ham United |
| 2 | DF | Vincent Candela | 24 October 1973 (aged 24) | 10 | (Italy) Roma |
| 3 | DF | Bixente Lizarazu | 9 December 1969 (aged 28) | 32 | (Germany) Bayern Munich |
| 4 | MF | Patrick Vieira | 23 June 1976 (aged 21) | 7 | (England) Arsenal |
| 5 | DF | Laurent Blanc | 19 November 1965 (aged 32) | 68 | (France) Marseille |
| 6 | MF | Youri Djorkaeff | 9 March 1968 (aged 30) | 37 | (Italy) Inter Milan |
| 7 | MF | Didier Deschamps (captain) | 15 October 1968 (aged 29) | 69 | (Italy) Juventus |
| 8 | DF | Marcel Desailly | 7 September 1968 (aged 29) | 41 | (Italy) Milan |
| 9 | FW | Stéphane Guivarc'h | 6 September 1970 (aged 27) | 6 | (France) Auxerre |
| 10 | MF | Zinedine Zidane | 23 June 1972 (aged 25) | 33 | (Italy) Juventus |
| 11 | MF | Robert Pires | 29 October 1973 (aged 24) | 14 | (France) Metz |
| 12 | FW | Thierry Henry | 17 August 1977 (aged 20) | 3 | (France) Monaco |
| 13 | MF | Bernard Diomède | 23 January 1974 (aged 24) | 6 | (France) Auxerre |
| 14 | MF | Alain Boghossian | 27 October 1970 (aged 27) | 6 | (Italy) Sampdoria |
| 15 | DF | Lilian Thuram | 1 January 1972 (aged 26) | 32 | (Italy) Parma |
| 16 | GK | Fabien Barthez | 28 June 1971 (aged 26) | 12 | (France) Monaco |
| 17 | MF | Emmanuel Petit | 22 September 1970 (aged 27) | 17 | (England) Arsenal |
| 18 | DF | Frank Leboeuf | 22 January 1968 (aged 30) | 14 | (England) Chelsea |
| 19 | MF | Christian Karembeu | 3 December 1970 (aged 27) | 31 | (Spain) Real Madrid |
| 20 | FW | David Trezeguet | 15 October 1977 (aged 20) | 4 | (France) Monaco |
| 21 | FW | Christophe Dugarry | 24 March 1972 (aged 26) | 23 | (France) Marseille |
| 22 | GK | Lionel Charbonnier | 25 October 1966 (aged 31) | 1 | (France) Auxerre |

=== Saudi Arabia ===
Head coach: (Brazil) Carlos Alberto Parreira (fired after two matches, replaced by Mohammed Al-Kharashy for the final match)

| No. | Pos. | Player | Date of birth (age) | Caps | Club |
|---|---|---|---|---|---|
| 1 | GK | Mohamed Al-Deayea | 2 August 1972 (aged 25) | 94 | (Saudi Arabia) Al-Ta'ee |
| 2 | DF | Mohammed Sheliah | 28 September 1974 (aged 23) | 64 | (Saudi Arabia) Al-Ahli |
| 3 | DF | Mohammed Al-Khilaiwi | 1 September 1971 (aged 26) | 86 | (Saudi Arabia) Al-Ittihad |
| 4 | MF | Abdullah Sulaiman Zubromawi | 15 November 1973 (aged 24) | 83 | (Saudi Arabia) Al-Ahli |
| 5 | DF | Ahmed Jamil | 6 January 1970 (aged 28) | 94 | (Saudi Arabia) Al-Ittihad |
| 6 | MF | Fuad Anwar | 13 October 1972 (aged 25) | 95 | (Saudi Arabia) Al-Shabab |
| 7 | MF | Ibrahim Suwayed | 21 July 1974 (aged 23) | 19 | (Saudi Arabia) Al-Ahli |
| 8 | FW | Obeid Al-Dosari | 2 October 1975 (aged 22) | 61 | (Saudi Arabia) Al-Wehda |
| 9 | FW | Sami Al-Jaber | 11 December 1972 (aged 25) | 85 | (Saudi Arabia) Al-Hilal |
| 10 | FW | Saeed Al-Owairan | 19 August 1967 (aged 30) | 55 | (Saudi Arabia) Al-Shabab |
| 11 | FW | Fahd Al-Mehallel | 11 November 1970 (aged 27) | 85 | (Saudi Arabia) Al-Shabab |
| 12 | MF | Ibrahim Mater | 10 July 1975 (aged 22) | 47 | (Saudi Arabia) Al-Nassr |
| 13 | DF | Hussein Abdulghani | 23 January 1977 (aged 21) | 40 | (Saudi Arabia) Al-Ahli |
| 14 | MF | Khaled Massad | 23 November 1971 (aged 26) | 91 | (Saudi Arabia) Al-Ahli |
| 15 | MF | Yousuf Al-Thunayan (captain) | 18 November 1963 (aged 34) | 86 | (Saudi Arabia) Al-Hilal |
| 16 | MF | Khamis Al-Owairan | 8 September 1973 (aged 24) | 48 | (Saudi Arabia) Al-Hilal |
| 17 | DF | Ahmed Al-Dokhi | 25 October 1976 (aged 21) | 12 | (Saudi Arabia) Al-Hilal |
| 18 | MF | Nawaf Al-Temyat | 26 June 1976 (aged 21) | 0 | (Saudi Arabia) Al-Hilal |
| 19 | DF | Abdulaziz Al-Janoubi | 21 July 1974 (aged 23) | 3 | (Saudi Arabia) Al-Nassr |
| 20 | MF | Hamzah Saleh | 19 April 1967 (aged 31) | 38 | (Saudi Arabia) Al-Ahli |
| 21 | GK | Hussein Al-Sadiq | 15 October 1973 (aged 24) | 64 | (Saudi Arabia) Al-Qadsiah |
| 22 | GK | Tisir Al-Antaif | 16 February 1974 (aged 24) | 0 | (Saudi Arabia) Al-Ettifaq |

=== South Africa ===
Head coach: (France) Philippe Troussier

| No. | Pos. | Player | Date of birth (age) | Caps | Club |
|---|---|---|---|---|---|
| 1 | GK | Hans Vonk | 30 January 1970 (aged 28) | 0 | (Netherlands) Heerenveen |
| 2 | DF | Themba Mnguni | 16 December 1973 (aged 24) | 3 | (South Africa) Mamelodi Sundowns |
| 3 | DF | David Nyathi | 22 March 1969 (aged 29) | 35 | (Switzerland) St. Gallen |
| 4 | DF | Willem Jackson | 26 March 1972 (aged 26) | 12 | (South Africa) Orlando Pirates |
| 5 | DF | Mark Fish | 14 March 1974 (aged 24) | 37 | (England) Bolton Wanderers |
| 6 | FW | Phil Masinga | 28 June 1969 (aged 28) | 41 | (Italy) Bari |
| 7 | MF | Quinton Fortune | 21 May 1977 (aged 21) | 6 | (Spain) Atlético Madrid |
| 8 | MF | Alfred Phiri | 22 June 1974 (aged 23) | 2 | (Turkey) Vanspor |
| 9 | FW | Shaun Bartlett | 31 October 1972 (aged 25) | 29 | (South Africa) Cape Town Spurs |
| 10 | MF | John Moshoeu | 18 December 1965 (aged 32) | 44 | (Turkey) Fenerbahçe |
| 11 | MF | Helman Mkhalele | 20 October 1969 (aged 28) | 35 | (Turkey) Kayserispor |
| 12 | FW | Brendan Augustine | 26 October 1971 (aged 26) | 26 | (Austria) LASK |
| 13 | FW | Delron Buckley | 7 December 1977 (aged 20) | 0 | (Germany) VfL Bochum |
| 14 | FW | Jerry Sikhosana | 8 June 1969 (aged 29) | 9 | (South Africa) Orlando Pirates |
| 15 | MF | Doctor Khumalo | 26 June 1967 (aged 30) | 43 | (South Africa) Kaizer Chiefs |
| 16 | GK | Brian Baloyi | 16 March 1974 (aged 24) | 8 | (South Africa) Kaizer Chiefs |
| 17 | FW | Benni McCarthy | 12 November 1977 (aged 20) | 10 | (Netherlands) Ajax |
| 18 | MF | Lebogang Morula | 22 December 1968 (aged 29) | 0 | (Turkey) Vanspor |
| 19 | DF | Lucas Radebe (captain) | 12 April 1969 (aged 29) | 41 | (England) Leeds United |
| 20 | MF | William Mokoena | 31 March 1975 (aged 23) | 0 | (South Africa) Manning Rangers |
| 21 | DF | Pierre Issa | 12 September 1975 (aged 22) | 1 | (France) Marseille |
| 22 | GK | Paul Evans* | 28 December 1973 (aged 24) | 0 | (South Africa) Supersport United |
| 23 | GK | Simon Gopane* | 26 December 1970 (aged 27) | 1 | (South Africa) Bloemfontein Celtic |

- Andre Arendse (#22) was injured before the start of the tournament. His replacement, Paul Evans, was also injured shortly after arriving as a replacement. Simon Gopane was then called up, and sat on the bench for the last two matches.

== Group D ==
=== Bulgaria ===
Head coach: Hristo Bonev

| No. | Pos. | Player | Date of birth (age) | Caps | Club |
|---|---|---|---|---|---|
| 1 | GK | Zdravko Zdravkov | 4 October 1970 (aged 27) | 16 | (Turkey) İstanbulspor |
| 2 | DF | Radostin Kishishev | 30 July 1974 (aged 23) | 22 | (Bulgaria) Litex Lovech |
| 3 | DF | Trifon Ivanov (captain) | 27 July 1965 (aged 32) | 72 | (Bulgaria) CSKA Sofia |
| 4 | DF | Ivaylo Petkov | 24 March 1976 (aged 22) | 10 | (Bulgaria) Litex Lovech |
| 5 | MF | Ivaylo Yordanov | 22 April 1968 (aged 30) | 38 | (Portugal) Sporting CP |
| 6 | MF | Zlatko Yankov | 7 June 1966 (aged 32) | 67 | (Turkey) Beşiktaş |
| 7 | FW | Emil Kostadinov | 12 August 1967 (aged 30) | 67 | (Bulgaria) CSKA Sofia |
| 8 | FW | Hristo Stoichkov | 8 February 1966 (aged 32) | 70 | (Saudi Arabia) Al-Nassr |
| 9 | FW | Lyuboslav Penev | 31 August 1966 (aged 31) | 58 | (Spain) Compostela |
| 10 | MF | Krasimir Balakov | 29 March 1966 (aged 32) | 66 | (Germany) VfB Stuttgart |
| 11 | MF | Ilian Iliev | 2 July 1968 (aged 29) | 15 | (Turkey) Bursaspor |
| 12 | GK | Borislav Mihaylov | 12 February 1963 (aged 35) | 96 | (Bulgaria) Slavia Sofia |
| 13 | DF | Gosho Ginchev | 2 February 1969 (aged 29) | 15 | (Turkey) Antalyaspor |
| 14 | MF | Marian Hristov | 29 July 1973 (aged 24) | 9 | (Germany) 1. FC Kaiserslautern |
| 15 | DF | Adalbert Zafirov | 29 September 1969 (aged 28) | 6 | (Germany) Arminia Bielefeld |
| 16 | MF | Anatoli Nankov | 15 July 1969 (aged 28) | 15 | (Bulgaria) Lokomotiv Sofia |
| 17 | MF | Stoycho Stoilov | 15 October 1971 (aged 26) | 1 | (Bulgaria) Litex Lovech |
| 18 | MF | Daniel Borimirov | 15 January 1970 (aged 28) | 36 | (Germany) 1860 Munich |
| 19 | FW | Georgi Bachev | 18 April 1977 (aged 21) | 4 | (Bulgaria) Slavia Sofia |
| 20 | FW | Georgi Ivanov | 2 July 1976 (aged 21) | 4 | (Bulgaria) Levski Sofia |
| 21 | DF | Rosen Kirilov | 4 January 1973 (aged 25) | 3 | (Bulgaria) Litex Lovech |
| 22 | MF | Milen Petkov | 12 January 1974 (aged 24) | 5 | (Bulgaria) CSKA Sofia |

=== Nigeria ===
Head coach: (Federal Republic of Yugoslavia) Bora Milutinović

| No. | Pos. | Player | Date of birth (age) | Caps | Club |
|---|---|---|---|---|---|
| 1 | GK | Peter Rufai | 24 August 1963 (aged 34) | 62 | (Spain) Deportivo La Coruña |
| 2 | DF | Mobi Oparaku | 1 December 1976 (aged 21) | 3 | (Belgium) Royal Cappellen |
| 3 | DF | Celestine Babayaro | 29 August 1978 (aged 19) | 6 | (England) Chelsea |
| 4 | FW | Nwankwo Kanu | 1 August 1976 (aged 21) | 7 | (Italy) Inter Milan |
| 5 | DF | Uche Okechukwu (captain) | 27 September 1967 (aged 30) | 41 | (Turkey) Fenerbahçe |
| 6 | DF | Taribo West | 26 March 1974 (aged 24) | 8 | (Italy) Inter Milan |
| 7 | MF | Finidi George | 15 April 1971 (aged 27) | 36 | (Spain) Real Betis |
| 8 | MF | Mutiu Adepoju | 22 December 1970 (aged 27) | 35 | (Spain) Real Sociedad |
| 9 | FW | Rashidi Yekini | 23 October 1963 (aged 34) | 58 | (Switzerland) Zürich |
| 10 | MF | Jay-Jay Okocha | 14 August 1973 (aged 24) | 26 | (Turkey) Fenerbahçe |
| 11 | MF | Garba Lawal | 22 May 1974 (aged 24) | 3 | (Netherlands) Roda JC |
| 12 | GK | Willy Okpara | 7 May 1968 (aged 30) | 5 | (South Africa) Orlando Pirates |
| 13 | MF | Tijani Babangida | 25 September 1973 (aged 24) | 4 | (Netherlands) Ajax |
| 14 | FW | Daniel Amokachi | 30 December 1972 (aged 25) | 43 | (Turkey) Beşiktaş |
| 15 | MF | Sunday Oliseh | 14 September 1974 (aged 23) | 22 | (Netherlands) Ajax |
| 16 | DF | Uche Okafor | 8 August 1967 (aged 30) | 33 | (United States) Kansas City Wizards |
| 17 | DF | Augustine Eguavoen | 19 August 1965 (aged 32) | 52 | (Russia) Torpedo Moscow |
| 18 | MF | Wilson Oruma | 30 December 1976 (aged 21) | 4 | (France) Lens |
| 19 | DF | Benedict Iroha | 29 November 1969 (aged 28) | 33 | (Spain) Elche |
| 20 | FW | Victor Ikpeba | 12 June 1973 (aged 24) | 15 | (France) Monaco |
| 21 | DF | Godwin Okpara | 20 September 1972 (aged 25) | 6 | (France) Strasbourg |
| 22 | GK | Abiodun Baruwa | 16 November 1974 (aged 23) | 3 | (Switzerland) Sion |

=== Paraguay ===
Head coach: (Brazil) Paulo César Carpegiani

| No. | Pos. | Player | Date of birth (age) | Caps | Club |
|---|---|---|---|---|---|
| 1 | GK | José Luis Chilavert (captain) | 27 July 1965 (aged 32) | 40 | (Argentina) Vélez Sarsfield |
| 2 | DF | Francisco Arce | 2 April 1971 (aged 27) | 28 | (Brazil) Palmeiras |
| 3 | DF | Catalino Rivarola | 30 April 1965 (aged 33) | 49 | (Brazil) Grêmio |
| 4 | DF | Carlos Gamarra | 17 February 1971 (aged 27) | 48 | (Brazil) Corinthians |
| 5 | DF | Celso Ayala | 20 August 1970 (aged 27) | 42 | (Argentina) River Plate |
| 6 | DF | Edgar Aguilera | 28 July 1975 (aged 22) | 1 | (Paraguay) Cerro Corá |
| 7 | MF | Julio César Yegros | 31 January 1971 (aged 27) | 6 | (Mexico) Cruz Azul |
| 8 | FW | Arístides Rojas | 12 August 1968 (aged 29) | 5 | (Argentina) Unión de Santa Fe |
| 9 | FW | José Cardozo | 19 March 1971 (aged 27) | 12 | (Mexico) Toluca |
| 10 | MF | Roberto Acuña | 25 March 1972 (aged 26) | 40 | (Spain) Zaragoza |
| 11 | DF | Pedro Sarabia | 5 July 1975 (aged 22) | 20 | (Argentina) River Plate |
| 12 | GK | Danilo Aceval | 15 September 1975 (aged 22) | 3 | (Argentina) Unión de Santa Fe |
| 13 | MF | Carlos Paredes | 16 July 1976 (aged 21) | 3 | (Paraguay) Olimpia |
| 14 | DF | Ricardo Rojas | 26 January 1971 (aged 27) | 6 | (Argentina) Estudiantes |
| 15 | FW | Miguel Ángel Benítez | 19 May 1970 (aged 28) | 32 | (Spain) Espanyol |
| 16 | MF | Julio César Enciso | 5 August 1974 (aged 23) | 4 | (Brazil) Internacional |
| 17 | FW | Hugo Brizuela | 8 February 1969 (aged 29) | 11 | (Argentina) Argentinos Juniors |
| 18 | FW | César Ramírez | 21 March 1977 (aged 21) | 3 | (Portugal) Sporting CP |
| 19 | MF | Carlos Morales | 4 November 1968 (aged 29) | 0 | (Argentina) Gimnasia de Jujuy |
| 20 | DF | Denis Caniza | 29 August 1974 (aged 23) | 8 | (Paraguay) Olimpia |
| 21 | MF | Jorge Luis Campos | 11 August 1970 (aged 27) | 10 | (China) Beijing Guoan |
| 22 | GK | Rubén Ruiz Díaz | 11 November 1969 (aged 28) | 12 | (Mexico) Monterrey |

=== Spain ===
Head coach: Javier Clemente

| No. | Pos. | Player | Date of birth (age) | Caps | Club |
|---|---|---|---|---|---|
| 1 | GK | Andoni Zubizarreta (captain) | 23 October 1961 (aged 36) | 123 | (Spain) Valencia |
| 2 | DF | Albert Ferrer | 6 June 1970 (aged 28) | 34 | (Spain) Barcelona |
| 3 | DF | Agustín Aranzábal | 15 March 1973 (aged 25) | 6 | (Spain) Real Sociedad |
| 4 | DF | Rafael Alkorta | 16 September 1968 (aged 29) | 48 | (Spain) Athletic Bilbao |
| 5 | DF | Abelardo | 19 March 1970 (aged 28) | 40 | (Spain) Barcelona |
| 6 | MF | Fernando Hierro | 23 March 1968 (aged 30) | 55 | (Spain) Real Madrid |
| 7 | FW | Fernando Morientes | 5 April 1976 (aged 22) | 2 | (Spain) Real Madrid |
| 8 | MF | Julen Guerrero | 7 January 1974 (aged 24) | 31 | (Spain) Athletic Bilbao |
| 9 | FW | Juan Antonio Pizzi | 7 June 1968 (aged 30) | 21 | (Spain) Barcelona |
| 10 | FW | Raúl | 27 June 1977 (aged 20) | 13 | (Spain) Real Madrid |
| 11 | FW | Alfonso | 26 September 1972 (aged 25) | 26 | (Spain) Real Betis |
| 12 | DF | Sergi | 28 December 1971 (aged 26) | 33 | (Spain) Barcelona |
| 13 | GK | Santiago Cañizares | 18 December 1969 (aged 28) | 10 | (Spain) Real Madrid |
| 14 | DF | Iván Campo | 21 February 1974 (aged 24) | 2 | (Spain) Mallorca |
| 15 | DF | Carlos Aguilera | 22 May 1969 (aged 29) | 4 | (Spain) Atlético Madrid |
| 16 | MF | Albert Celades | 29 September 1975 (aged 22) | 1 | (Spain) Barcelona |
| 17 | MF | Joseba Etxeberria | 5 September 1977 (aged 20) | 4 | (Spain) Athletic Bilbao |
| 18 | MF | Guillermo Amor | 4 December 1967 (aged 30) | 33 | (Spain) Barcelona |
| 19 | FW | Kiko | 26 April 1972 (aged 26) | 21 | (Spain) Atlético Madrid |
| 20 | DF | Miguel Ángel Nadal | 28 July 1966 (aged 31) | 43 | (Spain) Barcelona |
| 21 | MF | Luis Enrique | 8 May 1970 (aged 28) | 35 | (Spain) Barcelona |
| 22 | GK | José Molina | 8 August 1970 (aged 27) | 1 | (Spain) Atlético Madrid |

== Group E ==
=== Belgium ===
Head coach: Georges Leekens

| No. | Pos. | Player | Date of birth (age) | Caps | Club |
|---|---|---|---|---|---|
| 1 | GK | Filip De Wilde | 5 July 1964 (aged 33) | 25 | (Belgium) Anderlecht |
| 2 | DF | Bertrand Crasson | 5 October 1971 (aged 26) | 19 | (Italy) Napoli |
| 3 | DF | Lorenzo Staelens | 30 April 1964 (aged 34) | 52 | (Belgium) Club Brugge |
| 4 | DF | Gordan Vidović | 23 June 1968 (aged 29) | 11 | (Belgium) Mouscron |
| 5 | DF | Vital Borkelmans | 1 June 1963 (aged 35) | 22 | (Belgium) Club Brugge |
| 6 | MF | Franky Van der Elst (captain) | 30 April 1961 (aged 37) | 86 | (Belgium) Club Brugge |
| 7 | MF | Marc Wilmots | 22 February 1969 (aged 29) | 37 | (Germany) Schalke 04 |
| 8 | FW | Luís Oliveira | 24 March 1969 (aged 29) | 29 | (Italy) Fiorentina |
| 9 | FW | Mbo Mpenza | 4 December 1976 (aged 21) | 8 | (Belgium) Standard Liège |
| 10 | FW | Luc Nilis | 25 May 1967 (aged 31) | 51 | (Netherlands) PSV Eindhoven |
| 11 | MF | Nico Van Kerckhoven | 14 December 1970 (aged 27) | 17 | (Belgium) Lierse |
| 12 | GK | Philippe Vande Walle | 22 December 1961 (aged 36) | 4 | (Belgium) Eendracht Aalst |
| 13 | GK | Dany Verlinden | 15 August 1963 (aged 34) | 1 | (Belgium) Club Brugge |
| 14 | MF | Enzo Scifo | 19 February 1966 (aged 32) | 84 | (Belgium) Anderlecht |
| 15 | MF | Philippe Clement | 22 March 1974 (aged 24) | 8 | (Belgium) Genk |
| 16 | DF | Glen De Boeck | 22 August 1971 (aged 26) | 12 | (Belgium) Anderlecht |
| 17 | DF | Mike Verstraeten | 12 August 1967 (aged 30) | 6 | (Belgium) Germinal Ekeren |
| 18 | FW | Gert Verheyen | 20 September 1970 (aged 27) | 17 | (Belgium) Club Brugge |
| 19 | DF | Eric Van Meir | 28 February 1968 (aged 30) | 14 | (Belgium) Lierse |
| 20 | FW | Émile Mpenza | 4 July 1978 (aged 19) | 13 | (Belgium) Standard Liège |
| 21 | MF | Danny Boffin | 10 July 1965 (aged 32) | 40 | (France) Metz |
| 22 | DF | Éric Deflandre | 2 August 1973 (aged 24) | 12 | (Belgium) Club Brugge |

=== Mexico ===
Head coach: Manuel Lapuente

| No. | Pos. | Player | Date of birth (age) | Caps | Club |
|---|---|---|---|---|---|
| 1 | GK | Jorge Campos | 15 October 1966 (aged 31) | 106 | (United States) Chicago Fire |
| 2 | DF | Claudio Suárez | 17 December 1968 (aged 29) | 121 | (Mexico) Guadalajara |
| 3 | DF | Joel Sánchez | 17 August 1974 (aged 23) | 20 | (Mexico) Guadalajara |
| 4 | MF | Germán Villa | 2 April 1973 (aged 25) | 36 | (Mexico) América |
| 5 | DF | Duilio Davino | 21 March 1976 (aged 22) | 48 | (Mexico) América |
| 6 | MF | Marcelino Bernal | 27 May 1962 (aged 36) | 72 | (Mexico) Monterrey |
| 7 | MF | Ramón Ramírez | 5 December 1969 (aged 28) | 92 | (Mexico) Guadalajara |
| 8 | MF | Alberto García Aspe (captain) | 11 May 1967 (aged 31) | 82 | (Mexico) América |
| 9 | FW | Ricardo Peláez | 14 March 1963 (aged 35) | 41 | (Mexico) América |
| 10 | FW | Luis García | 1 June 1969 (aged 29) | 89 | (Mexico) Atlante |
| 11 | FW | Cuauhtémoc Blanco | 17 January 1973 (aged 25) | 42 | (Mexico) Necaxa |
| 12 | GK | Oswaldo Sánchez | 21 September 1973 (aged 24) | 9 | (Mexico) América |
| 13 | MF | Pável Pardo | 26 July 1976 (aged 21) | 43 | (Mexico) Atlas |
| 14 | MF | Raúl Lara | 28 February 1973 (aged 25) | 24 | (Mexico) América |
| 15 | FW | Luis Hernández | 22 December 1968 (aged 29) | 46 | (Mexico) Necaxa |
| 16 | DF | Isaac Terrazas | 17 April 1975 (aged 23) | 7 | (Mexico) América |
| 17 | FW | Francisco Palencia | 28 April 1973 (aged 25) | 27 | (Mexico) Cruz Azul |
| 18 | DF | Salvador Carmona | 22 August 1975 (aged 22) | 16 | (Mexico) Toluca |
| 19 | MF | Braulio Luna | 8 September 1974 (aged 23) | 15 | (Mexico) Pumas UNAM |
| 20 | MF | Jaime Ordiales | 23 December 1963 (aged 34) | 21 | (Mexico) Toluca |
| 21 | MF | Jesús Arellano | 8 May 1973 (aged 25) | 7 | (Mexico) Guadalajara |
| 22 | GK | Óscar Pérez | 1 February 1973 (aged 25) | 8 | (Mexico) Cruz Azul |

=== Netherlands ===
Head coach: Guus Hiddink

| No. | Pos. | Player | Date of birth (age) | Caps | Club |
|---|---|---|---|---|---|
| 1 | GK | Edwin van der Sar | 29 October 1970 (aged 27) | 25 | (Netherlands) Ajax |
| 2 | DF | Michael Reiziger | 3 May 1973 (aged 25) | 26 | (Spain) Barcelona |
| 3 | DF | Jaap Stam | 17 July 1972 (aged 25) | 14 | (Netherlands) PSV Eindhoven |
| 4 | DF | Frank de Boer (captain) | 15 May 1970 (aged 28) | 55 | (Netherlands) Ajax |
| 5 | DF | Arthur Numan | 14 December 1969 (aged 28) | 29 | (Netherlands) PSV Eindhoven |
| 6 | MF | Wim Jonk | 12 October 1966 (aged 31) | 42 | (Netherlands) PSV Eindhoven |
| 7 | MF | Ronald de Boer | 15 May 1970 (aged 28) | 41 | (Netherlands) Ajax |
| 8 | FW | Dennis Bergkamp | 10 May 1969 (aged 29) | 57 | (England) Arsenal |
| 9 | FW | Patrick Kluivert | 1 July 1976 (aged 21) | 19 | (Italy) Milan |
| 10 | MF | Clarence Seedorf | 1 April 1976 (aged 22) | 31 | (Spain) Real Madrid |
| 11 | MF | Phillip Cocu | 29 October 1970 (aged 27) | 20 | (Netherlands) PSV Eindhoven |
| 12 | MF | Boudewijn Zenden | 15 August 1976 (aged 21) | 6 | (Netherlands) PSV Eindhoven |
| 13 | DF | André Ooijer | 11 July 1974 (aged 23) | 0 | (Netherlands) PSV Eindhoven |
| 14 | MF | Marc Overmars | 29 March 1973 (aged 25) | 40 | (England) Arsenal |
| 15 | DF | Winston Bogarde | 22 October 1970 (aged 27) | 14 | (Spain) Barcelona |
| 16 | MF | Edgar Davids | 13 March 1973 (aged 25) | 12 | (Italy) Juventus |
| 17 | FW | Pierre van Hooijdonk | 29 November 1969 (aged 28) | 12 | (England) Nottingham Forest |
| 18 | GK | Ed de Goey | 20 December 1966 (aged 31) | 31 | (England) Chelsea |
| 19 | DF | Giovanni van Bronckhorst | 5 February 1975 (aged 23) | 8 | (Netherlands) Feyenoord |
| 20 | MF | Aron Winter | 1 March 1967 (aged 31) | 72 | (Italy) Inter Milan |
| 21 | FW | Jimmy Floyd Hasselbaink | 27 March 1972 (aged 26) | 3 | (England) Leeds United |
| 22 | GK | Ruud Hesp | 31 October 1965 (aged 32) | 0 | (Spain) Barcelona |

=== South Korea ===
Head coach: Cha Bum-kun (fired after two matches, replaced by Kim Pyung-seok for the final match)

| No. | Pos. | Player | Date of birth (age) | Caps | Club |
|---|---|---|---|---|---|
| 1 | GK | Kim Byung-ji | 8 April 1970 (aged 28) | 34 | (South Korea) Ulsan Hyundai Horangi |
| 2 | MF | Choi Sung-yong | 25 December 1975 (aged 22) | 27 | (South Korea) Sangmu |
| 3 | DF | Lee Lim-saeng | 18 November 1971 (aged 26) | 17 | (South Korea) Bucheon SK |
| 4 | DF | Choi Young-il (captain) | 25 April 1966 (aged 32) | 54 | (South Korea) Busan Daewoo Royals |
| 5 | DF | Lee Min-sung | 23 June 1973 (aged 24) | 29 | (South Korea) Busan Daewoo Royals |
| 6 | MF | Yoo Sang-chul | 18 October 1971 (aged 26) | 57 | (South Korea) Ulsan Hyundai Horangi |
| 7 | MF | Kim Do-keun | 2 March 1972 (aged 26) | 13 | (South Korea) Jeonnam Dragons |
| 8 | MF | Noh Jung-yoon | 28 March 1971 (aged 27) | 36 | (Netherlands) NAC Breda |
| 9 | FW | Kim Do-hoon | 21 July 1970 (aged 27) | 37 | (Japan) Vissel Kobe |
| 10 | FW | Choi Yong-soo | 10 September 1973 (aged 24) | 33 | (South Korea) Sangmu |
| 11 | FW | Seo Jung-won | 17 December 1970 (aged 27) | 73 | (France) Strasbourg |
| 12 | DF | Lee Sang-hun | 11 October 1975 (aged 22) | 13 | (South Korea) Anyang LG Cheetahs |
| 13 | DF | Kim Tae-young | 8 November 1970 (aged 27) | 35 | (South Korea) Jeonnam Dragons |
| 14 | MF | Ko Jong-soo | 30 October 1978 (aged 19) | 22 | (South Korea) Suwon Samsung Bluewings |
| 15 | MF | Lee Sang-yoon | 10 April 1969 (aged 29) | 28 | (South Korea) Cheonan Ilhwa Chunma |
| 16 | DF | Jang Hyung-seok | 7 July 1972 (aged 25) | 7 | (South Korea) Ulsan Hyundai Horangi |
| 17 | MF | Ha Seok-ju | 20 February 1968 (aged 30) | 82 | (Japan) Cerezo Osaka |
| 18 | FW | Hwang Sun-hong | 14 July 1968 (aged 29) | 78 | (South Korea) Pohang Steelers |
| 19 | DF | Jang Dae-il | 9 March 1975 (aged 23) | 14 | (South Korea) Cheonan Ilhwa Chunma |
| 20 | DF | Hong Myung-bo | 12 February 1969 (aged 29) | 94 | (Japan) Bellmare Hiratsuka |
| 21 | FW | Lee Dong-gook | 29 April 1979 (aged 19) | 0 | (South Korea) Pohang Steelers |
| 22 | GK | Seo Dong-myung | 4 May 1974 (aged 24) | 21 | (South Korea) Sangmu |

== Group F ==
=== Germany ===
Head coach: Berti Vogts

| No. | Pos. | Player | Date of birth (age) | Caps | Club |
|---|---|---|---|---|---|
| 1 | GK | Andreas Köpke | 12 March 1962 (aged 36) | 54 | (France) Marseille |
| 2 | DF | Christian Wörns | 10 May 1972 (aged 26) | 17 | (Germany) Bayer Leverkusen |
| 3 | DF | Jörg Heinrich | 6 December 1969 (aged 28) | 15 | (Germany) Borussia Dortmund |
| 4 | DF | Jürgen Kohler | 6 October 1965 (aged 32) | 101 | (Germany) Borussia Dortmund |
| 5 | DF | Thomas Helmer | 21 April 1965 (aged 33) | 66 | (Germany) Bayern Munich |
| 6 | DF | Olaf Thon | 1 May 1966 (aged 32) | 48 | (Germany) Schalke 04 |
| 7 | MF | Andreas Möller | 2 September 1967 (aged 30) | 79 | (Germany) Borussia Dortmund |
| 8 | DF | Lothar Matthäus | 21 March 1961 (aged 37) | 125 | (Germany) Bayern Munich |
| 9 | FW | Ulf Kirsten | 4 December 1965 (aged 32) | 32* | (Germany) Bayer Leverkusen |
| 10 | MF | Thomas Häßler | 30 May 1966 (aged 32) | 93 | (Germany) Karlsruher SC |
| 11 | FW | Olaf Marschall | 19 March 1966 (aged 32) | 7* | (Germany) 1. FC Kaiserslautern |
| 12 | GK | Oliver Kahn | 15 June 1969 (aged 28) | 10 | (Germany) Bayern Munich |
| 13 | MF | Jens Jeremies | 5 March 1974 (aged 24) | 5 | (Germany) 1860 Munich |
| 14 | DF | Markus Babbel | 8 September 1972 (aged 25) | 30 | (Germany) Bayern Munich |
| 15 | MF | Steffen Freund | 19 January 1970 (aged 28) | 21 | (Germany) Borussia Dortmund |
| 16 | MF | Dietmar Hamann | 27 August 1973 (aged 24) | 7 | (Germany) Bayern Munich |
| 17 | DF | Christian Ziege | 1 February 1972 (aged 26) | 37 | (Italy) Milan |
| 18 | FW | Jürgen Klinsmann (captain) | 30 July 1964 (aged 33) | 103 | (England) Tottenham Hotspur |
| 19 | DF | Stefan Reuter | 16 October 1966 (aged 31) | 68 | (Germany) Borussia Dortmund |
| 20 | FW | Oliver Bierhoff | 1 May 1968 (aged 30) | 26 | (Italy) Udinese |
| 21 | DF | Michael Tarnat | 27 October 1969 (aged 28) | 12 | (Germany) Bayern Munich |
| 22 | GK | Jens Lehmann | 10 November 1969 (aged 28) | 2 | (Germany) Schalke 04 |

Note: Kirsten and Marschall also earned additional caps for East Germany (49 and 4, respectively).

=== Iran ===
Head coach: Jalal Talebi

| No. | Pos. | Player | Date of birth (age) | Caps | Club |
|---|---|---|---|---|---|
| 1 | GK | Ahmad Reza Abedzadeh (captain) | 25 May 1966 (aged 32) | 77 | (Iran) Persepolis |
| 2 | MF | Mehdi Mahdavikia | 24 July 1977 (aged 20) | 29 | (Iran) Persepolis |
| 3 | DF | Naeim Saadavi | 16 June 1969 (aged 28) | 8 | (Iran) Persepolis |
| 4 | DF | Mohammad Khakpour | 20 February 1969 (aged 29) | 41 | (Iran) Bahman |
| 5 | DF | Afshin Peyrovani | 6 February 1970 (aged 28) | 40 | (Iran) Persepolis |
| 6 | MF | Karim Bagheri | 20 February 1974 (aged 24) | 46 | (Germany) Arminia Bielefeld |
| 7 | MF | Alireza Mansourian | 12 December 1971 (aged 26) | 33 | (Iran) Esteghlal |
| 8 | MF | Sirous Dinmohammadi | 2 July 1970 (aged 27) | 16 | (Iran) Shahrdari Tabriz |
| 9 | MF | Hamid Estili | 1 April 1967 (aged 31) | 52 | (Iran) Bahman |
| 10 | FW | Ali Daei | 21 March 1969 (aged 29) | 53 | (Germany) Arminia Bielefeld |
| 11 | FW | Khodadad Azizi | 22 June 1971 (aged 26) | 27 | (Germany) 1. FC Köln |
| 12 | GK | Nima Nakisa | 1 May 1975 (aged 23) | 6 | (Iran) Persepolis |
| 13 | FW | Ali Latifi | 20 February 1976 (aged 22) | 0 | (Iran) Bahman |
| 14 | DF | Nader Mohammadkhani | 23 August 1963 (aged 34) | 52 | (Iran) Polyacryl |
| 15 | DF | Ali Akbar Ostad-Asadi | 17 September 1965 (aged 32) | 29 | (Iran) Zob Ahan |
| 16 | DF | Reza Shahroudi | 21 February 1972 (aged 26) | 34 | (Iran) Persepolis |
| 17 | DF | Javad Zarincheh | 23 July 1966 (aged 31) | 61 | (Iran) Esteghlal |
| 18 | MF | Sattar Hamedani | 6 June 1974 (aged 24) | 3 | (Iran) Bahman |
| 19 | FW | Behnam Seraj | 19 June 1971 (aged 26) | 0 | (Iran) Sanat Naft |
| 20 | DF | Mehdi Pashazadeh | 27 December 1973 (aged 24) | 4 | (Iran) Esteghlal |
| 21 | MF | Mehrdad Minavand | 30 November 1975 (aged 22) | 27 | (Iran) Persepolis |
| 22 | GK | Parviz Boroumand | 11 September 1972 (aged 25) | 0 | (Iran) Esteghlal |

=== United States ===
Head coach: Steve Sampson

| No. | Pos. | Player | Date of birth (age) | Caps | Club |
|---|---|---|---|---|---|
| 1 | GK | Brad Friedel | 18 May 1971 (aged 27) | 56 | (England) Liverpool |
| 2 | DF | Frankie Hejduk | 5 August 1974 (aged 23) | 11 | (United States) Tampa Bay Mutiny |
| 3 | DF | Eddie Pope | 24 December 1973 (aged 24) | 23 | (United States) D.C. United |
| 4 | DF | Mike Burns | 14 September 1970 (aged 27) | 73 | (United States) New England Revolution |
| 5 | MF | Thomas Dooley (captain) | 5 December 1961 (aged 36) | 77 | (United States) Columbus Crew |
| 6 | DF | David Regis | 2 December 1968 (aged 29) | 2 | (Germany) Karlsruher SC |
| 7 | FW | Roy Wegerle | 19 March 1964 (aged 34) | 39 | (United States) Tampa Bay Mutiny |
| 8 | MF | Earnie Stewart | 28 March 1969 (aged 29) | 47 | (Netherlands) NAC Breda |
| 9 | FW | Joe-Max Moore | 23 February 1971 (aged 27) | 68 | (United States) New England Revolution |
| 10 | MF | Tab Ramos | 21 September 1966 (aged 31) | 80 | (United States) MetroStars |
| 11 | FW | Eric Wynalda | 9 June 1969 (aged 29) | 100 | (United States) San Jose Clash |
| 12 | DF | Jeff Agoos | 2 May 1968 (aged 30) | 87 | (United States) D.C. United |
| 13 | MF | Cobi Jones | 16 June 1970 (aged 27) | 107 | (United States) LA Galaxy |
| 14 | MF | Predrag Radosavljević | 24 June 1963 (aged 34) | 24 | (United States) Kansas City Wizards |
| 15 | MF | Chad Deering | 2 September 1970 (aged 27) | 10 | (Germany) VfL Wolfsburg |
| 16 | GK | Juergen Sommer | 27 February 1969 (aged 29) | 8 | (United States) Columbus Crew |
| 17 | DF | Marcelo Balboa | 8 August 1967 (aged 30) | 126 | (United States) Colorado Rapids |
| 18 | GK | Kasey Keller | 29 November 1969 (aged 28) | 33 | (England) Leicester City |
| 19 | MF | Brian Maisonneuve | 28 June 1973 (aged 24) | 7 | (United States) Columbus Crew |
| 20 | FW | Brian McBride | 19 June 1972 (aged 25) | 21 | (United States) Columbus Crew |
| 21 | MF | Claudio Reyna | 20 July 1973 (aged 24) | 59 | (Germany) VfL Wolfsburg |
| 22 | DF | Alexi Lalas | 1 June 1970 (aged 28) | 98 | (United States) MetroStars |

=== FR Yugoslavia ===
Head coach: Slobodan Santrač

| No. | Pos. | Player | Date of birth (age) | Caps | Club |
|---|---|---|---|---|---|
| 1 | GK | Ivica Kralj | 26 March 1973 (aged 25) | 15 | (Federal Republic of Yugoslavia) Partizan |
| 2 | DF | Zoran Mirković | 21 September 1971 (aged 26) | 28 | (Italy) Atalanta |
| 3 | DF | Goran Đorović | 11 November 1971 (aged 26) | 26 | (Spain) Celta Vigo |
| 4 | MF | Slaviša Jokanović | 16 August 1968 (aged 29) | 33 | (Spain) Tenerife |
| 5 | DF | Miroslav Đukić | 19 February 1966 (aged 32) | 23 | (Spain) Valencia |
| 6 | MF | Branko Brnović | 8 August 1967 (aged 30) | 22 | (Spain) Espanyol |
| 7 | MF | Vladimir Jugović | 30 August 1969 (aged 28) | 24 | (Italy) Lazio |
| 8 | MF | Dejan Savićević | 15 September 1966 (aged 31) | 49 | (Italy) Milan |
| 9 | FW | Predrag Mijatović | 19 January 1969 (aged 29) | 28 | (Spain) Real Madrid |
| 10 | MF | Dragan Stojković (captain) | 3 March 1965 (aged 33) | 64 | (Japan) Nagoya Grampus Eight |
| 11 | DF | Siniša Mihajlović | 20 February 1969 (aged 29) | 30 | (Italy) Sampdoria |
| 12 | GK | Dragoje Leković | 21 November 1967 (aged 30) | 14 | (Spain) Sporting Gijón |
| 13 | DF | Slobodan Komljenović | 2 January 1971 (aged 27) | 8 | (Germany) MSV Duisburg |
| 14 | DF | Niša Saveljić | 23 February 1970 (aged 28) | 20 | (France) Bordeaux |
| 15 | MF | Ljubinko Drulović | 11 September 1968 (aged 29) | 16 | (Portugal) Porto |
| 16 | DF | Željko Petrović | 13 November 1965 (aged 32) | 12 | (Japan) Urawa Red Diamonds |
| 17 | FW | Savo Milošević | 2 September 1973 (aged 24) | 28 | (England) Aston Villa |
| 18 | MF | Dejan Govedarica | 2 October 1969 (aged 28) | 20 | (Italy) Lecce |
| 19 | MF | Miroslav Stević | 7 January 1970 (aged 28) | 5 | (Germany) 1860 Munich |
| 20 | MF | Dejan Stanković | 11 September 1978 (aged 19) | 3 | (Federal Republic of Yugoslavia) Red Star Belgrade |
| 21 | FW | Perica Ognjenović | 24 February 1977 (aged 21) | 5 | (Federal Republic of Yugoslavia) Red Star Belgrade |
| 22 | FW | Darko Kovačević | 18 November 1973 (aged 24) | 19 | (Spain) Real Sociedad |

== Group G ==
=== Colombia ===
Head coach: Hernán Darío Gómez

| No. | Pos. | Player | Date of birth (age) | Caps | Club |
|---|---|---|---|---|---|
| 1 | GK | Óscar Córdoba | 3 February 1970 (aged 28) | 38 | (Argentina) Boca Juniors |
| 2 | DF | Iván Córdoba | 11 August 1976 (aged 21) | 14 | (Argentina) San Lorenzo |
| 3 | DF | Ever Palacios | 18 January 1969 (aged 29) | 1 | (Colombia) Deportivo Cali |
| 4 | DF | José Santa | 12 November 1970 (aged 27) | 26 | (Colombia) Atlético Nacional |
| 5 | DF | Jorge Bermúdez | 18 June 1971 (aged 26) | 15 | (Argentina) Boca Juniors |
| 6 | MF | Mauricio Serna | 22 January 1968 (aged 30) | 2 | (Argentina) Boca Juniors |
| 7 | FW | Antony de Ávila | 21 December 1962 (aged 35) | 52 | (Ecuador) Barcelona |
| 8 | MF | Harold Lozano | 30 March 1972 (aged 26) | 13 | (Spain) Valladolid |
| 9 | FW | Adolfo Valencia | 6 February 1968 (aged 30) | 34 | (Colombia) Independiente Medellín |
| 10 | MF | Carlos Valderrama (captain) | 2 September 1961 (aged 36) | 108 | (United States) Miami Fusion |
| 11 | FW | Faustino Asprilla | 10 November 1969 (aged 28) | 44 | (Italy) Parma |
| 12 | GK | Miguel Calero | 14 April 1971 (aged 27) | 5 | (Colombia) Atlético Nacional |
| 13 | DF | Wílmer Cabrera | 15 September 1967 (aged 30) | 45 | (Colombia) Millonarios |
| 14 | MF | Jorge Bolaño | 28 April 1977 (aged 21) | 0 | (Colombia) Atlético Junior |
| 15 | FW | Víctor Aristizábal | 9 December 1971 (aged 26) | 18 | (Brazil) São Paulo |
| 16 | DF | Luis Antonio Moreno | 25 December 1970 (aged 27) | 19 | (Colombia) Deportes Tolima |
| 17 | MF | Andrés Estrada | 12 November 1967 (aged 30) | 2 | (Colombia) Atlético Nacional |
| 18 | MF | John Wilmar Pérez | 2 February 1970 (aged 28) | 5 | (Colombia) Deportivo Cali |
| 19 | MF | Freddy Rincón | 14 August 1966 (aged 31) | 75 | (Brazil) Corinthians |
| 20 | FW | Hámilton Ricard | 12 January 1974 (aged 24) | 5 | (England) Middlesbrough |
| 21 | FW | Léider Preciado | 26 February 1977 (aged 21) | 0 | (Colombia) Santa Fe |
| 22 | GK | Faryd Mondragón | 21 June 1971 (aged 26) | 5 | (Argentina) Independiente |

=== England ===
Head coach: Glenn Hoddle

| No. | Pos. | Player | Date of birth (age) | Caps | Club |
|---|---|---|---|---|---|
| 1 | GK | David Seaman | 19 September 1963 (aged 34) | 40 | (England) Arsenal |
| 2 | DF | Sol Campbell | 18 September 1974 (aged 23) | 16 | (England) Tottenham Hotspur |
| 3 | DF | Graeme Le Saux | 17 October 1968 (aged 29) | 25 | (England) Chelsea |
| 4 | MF | Paul Ince | 21 October 1967 (aged 30) | 39 | (England) Liverpool |
| 5 | DF | Tony Adams | 10 October 1966 (aged 31) | 51 | (England) Arsenal |
| 6 | DF | Gareth Southgate | 3 September 1970 (aged 27) | 25 | (England) Aston Villa |
| 7 | MF | David Beckham | 2 May 1975 (aged 23) | 15 | (England) Manchester United |
| 8 | MF | David Batty | 2 December 1968 (aged 29) | 31 | (England) Newcastle United |
| 9 | FW | Alan Shearer (captain) | 13 August 1970 (aged 27) | 39 | (England) Newcastle United |
| 10 | FW | Teddy Sheringham | 2 April 1966 (aged 32) | 33 | (England) Manchester United |
| 11 | MF | Steve McManaman | 11 February 1972 (aged 26) | 21 | (England) Liverpool |
| 12 | DF | Gary Neville | 18 February 1975 (aged 23) | 27 | (England) Manchester United |
| 13 | GK | Nigel Martyn | 11 August 1966 (aged 31) | 7 | (England) Leeds United |
| 14 | MF | Darren Anderton | 3 March 1972 (aged 26) | 18 | (England) Tottenham Hotspur |
| 15 | MF | Paul Merson | 20 March 1968 (aged 30) | 18 | (England) Middlesbrough |
| 16 | MF | Paul Scholes | 16 November 1974 (aged 23) | 7 | (England) Manchester United |
| 17 | MF | Rob Lee | 1 February 1966 (aged 32) | 17 | (England) Newcastle United |
| 18 | DF | Martin Keown | 24 July 1966 (aged 31) | 18 | (England) Arsenal |
| 19 | FW | Les Ferdinand | 8 December 1966 (aged 31) | 17 | (England) Tottenham Hotspur |
| 20 | FW | Michael Owen | 14 December 1979 (aged 18) | 5 | (England) Liverpool |
| 21 | DF | Rio Ferdinand | 7 November 1978 (aged 19) | 3 | (England) West Ham United |
| 22 | GK | Tim Flowers | 3 February 1967 (aged 31) | 11 | (England) Blackburn Rovers |

=== Romania ===
Head coach: Anghel Iordănescu

| No. | Pos. | Player | Date of birth (age) | Caps | Club |
|---|---|---|---|---|---|
| 1 | GK | Dumitru Stângaciu | 9 August 1964 (aged 33) | 5 | (Turkey) Kocaelispor |
| 2 | DF | Dan Petrescu | 22 December 1967 (aged 30) | 68 | (England) Chelsea |
| 3 | DF | Cristian Dulca | 25 September 1972 (aged 25) | 5 | (Romania) Rapid București |
| 4 | DF | Anton Doboș | 13 October 1965 (aged 32) | 21 | (Greece) AEK Athens |
| 5 | MF | Constantin Gâlcă | 8 March 1972 (aged 26) | 32 | (Spain) Espanyol |
| 6 | DF | Gheorghe Popescu | 9 October 1967 (aged 30) | 78 | (Turkey) Galatasaray |
| 7 | FW | Marius Lăcătuș | 5 April 1964 (aged 34) | 81 | (Romania) Steaua București |
| 8 | MF | Dorinel Munteanu | 25 June 1968 (aged 29) | 63 | (Germany) 1. FC Köln |
| 9 | FW | Viorel Moldovan | 8 July 1972 (aged 25) | 24 | (England) Coventry City |
| 10 | MF | Gheorghe Hagi (captain) | 5 February 1965 (aged 33) | 111 | (Turkey) Galatasaray |
| 11 | FW | Adrian Ilie | 20 April 1974 (aged 24) | 20 | (Spain) Valencia |
| 12 | GK | Bogdan Stelea | 5 December 1967 (aged 30) | 46 | (Spain) Salamanca |
| 13 | DF | Liviu Ciobotariu | 26 March 1971 (aged 27) | 4 | (Romania) Național București |
| 14 | FW | Radu Niculescu | 2 March 1975 (aged 23) | 11 | (Romania) Național București |
| 15 | MF | Lucian Marinescu | 24 June 1972 (aged 25) | 4 | (Romania) Rapid București |
| 16 | MF | Gabriel Popescu | 23 December 1973 (aged 24) | 12 | (Spain) Salamanca |
| 17 | FW | Ilie Dumitrescu | 6 January 1969 (aged 29) | 62 | (Mexico) Atlante |
| 18 | MF | Iulian Filipescu | 29 March 1974 (aged 24) | 15 | (Turkey) Galatasaray |
| 19 | MF | Ovidiu Stîngă | 5 December 1972 (aged 25) | 19 | (Netherlands) PSV Eindhoven |
| 20 | DF | Tibor Selymes | 14 May 1970 (aged 28) | 44 | (Belgium) Anderlecht |
| 21 | FW | Gheorghe Craioveanu | 14 February 1968 (aged 30) | 18 | (Spain) Real Sociedad |
| 22 | GK | Florin Prunea | 8 August 1968 (aged 29) | 35 | (Romania) Universitatea Cluj |

=== Tunisia ===
Head coach: (Poland) Henryk Kasperczak (fired after two matches, replaced by Ali Selmi for the final match)

| No. | Pos. | Player | Date of birth (age) | Caps | Club |
|---|---|---|---|---|---|
| 1 | GK | Chokri El Ouaer | 15 August 1966 (aged 31) | 51 | (Tunisia) Espérance de Tunis |
| 2 | FW | Imed Ben Younes | 16 June 1974 (aged 23) | 7 | (Tunisia) Étoile du Sahel |
| 3 | DF | Sami Trabelsi (captain) | 4 February 1968 (aged 30) | 45 | (Tunisia) CS Sfaxien |
| 4 | DF | Mounir Boukadida | 24 October 1967 (aged 30) | 30 | (Tunisia) Étoile du Sahel |
| 5 | DF | Hatem Trabelsi | 25 January 1977 (aged 21) | 2 | (Tunisia) CS Sfaxien |
| 6 | DF | Ferid Chouchane | 19 April 1973 (aged 25) | 26 | (Tunisia) Étoile du Sahel |
| 7 | DF | Tarek Thabet | 16 August 1971 (aged 26) | 43 | (Tunisia) Espérance de Tunis |
| 8 | MF | Zoubeir Baya | 15 May 1971 (aged 27) | 44 | (Germany) SC Freiburg |
| 9 | FW | Riadh Jelassi | 7 July 1971 (aged 26) | 13 | (Tunisia) Étoile du Sahel |
| 10 | MF | Kaies Ghodhbane | 7 January 1976 (aged 22) | 46 | (Tunisia) Étoile du Sahel |
| 11 | FW | Adel Sellimi | 16 November 1972 (aged 25) | 57 | (Spain) Real Jaén |
| 12 | MF | Mourad Melki | 9 May 1975 (aged 23) | 2 | (Tunisia) Olympique Béja |
| 13 | MF | Riadh Bouazizi | 8 April 1973 (aged 25) | 24 | (Tunisia) Étoile du Sahel |
| 14 | MF | Sirajeddine Chihi | 16 April 1970 (aged 28) | 47 | (Tunisia) Espérance de Tunis |
| 15 | MF | Skander Souayah | 20 November 1972 (aged 25) | 31 | (Tunisia) CS Sfaxien |
| 16 | GK | Radhouane Salhi | 18 December 1967 (aged 30) | 5 | (Tunisia) Étoile du Sahel |
| 17 | DF | José Clayton | 21 March 1974 (aged 24) | 4 | (Tunisia) Étoile du Sahel |
| 18 | FW | Mehdi Ben Slimane | 1 January 1974 (aged 24) | 32 | (Germany) SC Freiburg |
| 19 | MF | Faysal Ben Ahmed | 7 March 1973 (aged 25) | 2 | (Tunisia) Espérance de Tunis |
| 20 | DF | Sabri Jaballah | 28 June 1973 (aged 24) | 20 | (Tunisia) Club Africain |
| 21 | DF | Khaled Badra | 8 April 1973 (aged 25) | 26 | (Tunisia) Espérance de Tunis |
| 22 | GK | Ali Boumnijel | 13 April 1966 (aged 32) | 12 | (France) Bastia |

== Group H ==
=== Argentina ===
Head coach: Daniel Passarella

| No. | Pos. | Player | Date of birth (age) | Caps | Club |
|---|---|---|---|---|---|
| 1 | GK | Carlos Roa | 15 August 1969 (aged 28) | 10 | (Spain) Mallorca |
| 2 | DF | Roberto Ayala | 14 April 1973 (aged 25) | 37 | (Italy) Napoli |
| 3 | DF | José Chamot | 17 May 1969 (aged 29) | 31 | (Italy) Lazio |
| 4 | DF | Mauricio Pineda | 13 July 1975 (aged 22) | 7 | (Italy) Udinese |
| 5 | MF | Matías Almeyda | 21 December 1973 (aged 24) | 24 | (Italy) Lazio |
| 6 | DF | Roberto Sensini | 12 October 1966 (aged 31) | 44 | (Italy) Parma |
| 7 | FW | Claudio López | 17 July 1974 (aged 23) | 25 | (Spain) Valencia |
| 8 | MF | Diego Simeone (captain) | 28 April 1970 (aged 28) | 69 | (Italy) Inter Milan |
| 9 | FW | Gabriel Batistuta | 1 February 1969 (aged 29) | 61 | (Italy) Fiorentina |
| 10 | MF | Ariel Ortega | 4 March 1974 (aged 24) | 50 | (Spain) Valencia |
| 11 | MF | Juan Sebastián Verón | 9 March 1975 (aged 23) | 17 | (Italy) Sampdoria |
| 12 | GK | Germán Burgos | 16 April 1969 (aged 29) | 9 | (Argentina) River Plate |
| 13 | DF | Pablo Paz | 27 January 1973 (aged 25) | 15 | (Spain) Tenerife |
| 14 | DF | Nelson Vivas | 18 October 1969 (aged 28) | 11 | (Switzerland) Lugano |
| 15 | MF | Leonardo Astrada | 6 January 1970 (aged 28) | 20 | (Argentina) River Plate |
| 16 | MF | Sergio Berti | 17 September 1969 (aged 28) | 15 | (Argentina) River Plate |
| 17 | GK | Pablo Cavallero | 13 April 1974 (aged 24) | 8 | (Argentina) Vélez Sársfield |
| 18 | FW | Abel Balbo | 1 June 1966 (aged 32) | 34 | (Italy) Roma |
| 19 | FW | Hernán Crespo | 5 July 1975 (aged 22) | 18 | (Italy) Parma |
| 20 | MF | Marcelo Gallardo | 18 January 1976 (aged 22) | 23 | (Argentina) River Plate |
| 21 | FW | Marcelo Delgado | 24 March 1973 (aged 25) | 14 | (Argentina) Racing |
| 22 | DF | Javier Zanetti | 10 August 1973 (aged 24) | 30 | (Italy) Inter Milan |

=== Croatia ===
Head coach: Miroslav Blažević

| No. | Pos. | Player | Date of birth (age) | Caps | Club |
|---|---|---|---|---|---|
| 1 | GK | Dražen Ladić | 1 January 1963 (aged 35) | 41 | Croatia Zagreb |
| 2 | FW | Petar Krpan | 1 July 1974 (aged 23) | 1 | (Croatia) Osijek |
| 3 | DF | Anthony Šerić | 15 January 1979 (aged 19) | 3 | (Croatia) Hajduk Split |
| 4 | DF | Igor Štimac | 6 September 1967 (aged 30) | 29 | (England) Derby County |
| 5 | DF | Goran Jurić | 5 February 1963 (aged 35) | 11 | Croatia Zagreb |
| 6 | DF | Slaven Bilić | 11 September 1968 (aged 29) | 36 | (England) Everton |
| 7 | MF | Aljoša Asanović | 14 December 1965 (aged 32) | 39 | (Italy) Napoli |
| 8 | MF | Robert Prosinečki | 12 January 1969 (aged 29) | 29 | Croatia Zagreb |
| 9 | FW | Davor Šuker | 1 January 1968 (aged 30) | 36 | (Spain) Real Madrid |
| 10 | MF | Zvonimir Boban (captain) | 8 October 1968 (aged 29) | 35 | (Italy) Milan |
| 11 | MF | Silvio Marić | 20 March 1975 (aged 23) | 7 | Croatia Zagreb |
| 12 | GK | Marijan Mrmić | 6 May 1965 (aged 33) | 12 | (Turkey) Beşiktaş |
| 13 | MF | Mario Stanić | 10 April 1972 (aged 26) | 16 | (Italy) Parma |
| 14 | MF | Zvonimir Soldo | 2 November 1967 (aged 30) | 26 | (Germany) VfB Stuttgart |
| 15 | DF | Igor Tudor | 16 April 1978 (aged 20) | 5 | (Croatia) Hajduk Split |
| 16 | FW | Ardian Kozniku | 27 October 1967 (aged 30) | 7 | (France) Bastia |
| 17 | DF | Robert Jarni | 26 October 1968 (aged 29) | 38 | (Spain) Real Betis |
| 18 | MF | Zoran Mamić | 30 September 1971 (aged 26) | 6 | (Germany) VfL Bochum |
| 19 | FW | Goran Vlaović | 7 August 1972 (aged 25) | 28 | (Spain) Valencia |
| 20 | DF | Dario Šimić | 12 November 1975 (aged 22) | 17 | Croatia Zagreb |
| 21 | MF | Krunoslav Jurčić | 26 November 1969 (aged 28) | 9 | Croatia Zagreb |
| 22 | GK | Vladimir Vasilj | 6 July 1975 (aged 22) | 1 | (Croatia) Hrvatski Dragovoljac |

=== Jamaica ===
Head coach: (Brazil) Renê Simões

| No. | Pos. | Player | Date of birth (age) | Caps | Club |
|---|---|---|---|---|---|
| 1 | GK | Warren Barrett (captain) | 9 July 1970 (aged 27) | 128 | (Jamaica) Violet Kickers |
| 2 | DF | Stephen Malcolm | 2 May 1970 (aged 28) | 62 | (Jamaica) Seba United |
| 3 | MF | Chris Dawes | 31 May 1974 (aged 24) | 20 | (Jamaica) Galaxy |
| 4 | DF | Linval Dixon | 14 September 1971 (aged 26) | 104 | (Jamaica) Hazard United |
| 5 | DF | Ian Goodison | 21 November 1972 (aged 25) | 55 | (Jamaica) Olympic Gardens |
| 6 | MF | Fitzroy Simpson | 26 February 1970 (aged 28) | 23 | (England) Portsmouth |
| 7 | MF | Peter Cargill | 2 March 1964 (aged 34) | 76 | (Jamaica) Harbour View |
| 8 | FW | Marcus Gayle | 27 September 1970 (aged 27) | 5 | (England) Wimbledon |
| 9 | FW | Andy Williams | 23 September 1977 (aged 20) | 25 | (United States) Columbus Crew |
| 10 | FW | Walter Boyd | 1 January 1972 (aged 26) | 57 | (Jamaica) Arnett Gardens |
| 11 | MF | Theodore Whitmore | 5 August 1972 (aged 25) | 76 | (Jamaica) Seba United |
| 12 | DF | Dean Sewell | 13 April 1972 (aged 26) | 4 | (Jamaica) Constant Spring |
| 13 | GK | Aaron Lawrence | 11 August 1970 (aged 27) | 17 | (Jamaica) Reno |
| 14 | GK | Donovan Ricketts | 7 June 1977 (aged 21) | 0 | (Jamaica) Wadadah |
| 15 | DF | Ricardo Gardner | 25 September 1978 (aged 19) | 34 | (Jamaica) Harbour View |
| 16 | MF | Robbie Earle | 27 January 1965 (aged 33) | 8 | (England) Wimbledon |
| 17 | FW | Onandi Lowe | 2 December 1973 (aged 24) | 30 | (Jamaica) Waterhouse |
| 18 | FW | Deon Burton | 25 October 1976 (aged 21) | 18 | (England) Derby County |
| 19 | DF | Frank Sinclair | 3 December 1971 (aged 26) | 5 | (England) Chelsea |
| 20 | MF | Darryl Powell | 15 November 1971 (aged 26) | 2 | (England) Derby County |
| 21 | DF | Durrant Brown | 8 July 1964 (aged 33) | 125 | (Jamaica) Wadadah |
| 22 | FW | Paul Hall | 3 July 1972 (aged 25) | 23 | (England) Portsmouth |

=== Japan ===
Head coach: Takeshi Okada

| No. | Pos. | Player | Date of birth (age) | Caps | Club |
|---|---|---|---|---|---|
| 1 | GK | Nobuyuki Kojima | 17 January 1966 (aged 32) | 5 | (Japan) Bellmare Hiratsuka |
| 2 | DF | Akira Narahashi | 26 November 1971 (aged 26) | 29 | (Japan) Kashima Antlers |
| 3 | DF | Naoki Sōma | 19 July 1971 (aged 26) | 50 | (Japan) Kashima Antlers |
| 4 | DF | Masami Ihara (captain) | 18 September 1967 (aged 30) | 116 | (Japan) Yokohama Marinos |
| 5 | DF | Norio Omura | 6 September 1969 (aged 28) | 31 | (Japan) Yokohama Marinos |
| 6 | MF | Motohiro Yamaguchi | 29 January 1969 (aged 29) | 56 | (Japan) Yokohama Flügels |
| 7 | MF | Teruyoshi Itō | 31 August 1974 (aged 23) | 2 | (Japan) Shimizu S-Pulse |
| 8 | MF | Hidetoshi Nakata | 22 January 1977 (aged 21) | 21 | (Japan) Bellmare Hiratsuka |
| 9 | FW | Masashi Nakayama | 23 September 1967 (aged 30) | 27 | (Japan) Júbilo Iwata |
| 10 | MF | Hiroshi Nanami | 28 November 1972 (aged 25) | 44 | (Japan) Júbilo Iwata |
| 11 | MF | Shinji Ono | 27 September 1979 (aged 18) | 2 | (Japan) Urawa Red Diamonds |
| 12 | FW | Wagner Lopes | 29 January 1969 (aged 29) | 10 | (Japan) Bellmare Hiratsuka |
| 13 | MF | Toshihiro Hattori | 23 September 1973 (aged 24) | 6 | (Japan) Júbilo Iwata |
| 14 | FW | Masayuki Okano | 25 July 1972 (aged 25) | 25 | (Japan) Urawa Red Diamonds |
| 15 | MF | Hiroaki Morishima | 30 April 1972 (aged 26) | 36 | (Japan) Cerezo Osaka |
| 16 | DF | Toshihide Saitō | 20 April 1973 (aged 25) | 14 | (Japan) Shimizu S-Pulse |
| 17 | DF | Yutaka Akita | 6 August 1970 (aged 27) | 27 | (Japan) Kashima Antlers |
| 18 | FW | Shōji Jō | 17 June 1975 (aged 22) | 24 | (Japan) Yokohama Marinos |
| 19 | DF | Eisuke Nakanishi | 23 June 1973 (aged 24) | 7 | (Japan) JEF United Ichihara |
| 20 | GK | Yoshikatsu Kawaguchi | 15 August 1975 (aged 22) | 27 | (Japan) Yokohama Marinos |
| 21 | GK | Seigō Narazaki | 15 April 1976 (aged 22) | 2 | (Japan) Yokohama Flügels |
| 22 | MF | Takashi Hirano | 15 July 1974 (aged 23) | 10 | (Japan) Nagoya Grampus Eight |

== Notes ==
Each national team had to submit a squad of 22 players. All the teams included 3 goalkeepers, except Bulgaria, FR Yugoslavia and South Korea who only called two.

== Age ==
=== Players ===
- Oldest: (Scotland) Jim Leighton (39 years, 321 days)
- Youngest: (Cameroon) Samuel Eto'o (17 years, 92 days)

=== Captains ===
- Oldest: (Belgium) Franky Van der Elst (37 years, 41 days)
- Youngest: (England) Alan Shearer (27 years, 301 days)

=== Goalkeepers ===
- Oldest: (Scotland) Jim Leighton (39 years, 321 days)
- Youngest: (Italy) Gianluigi Buffon (20 years, 133 days)

== Player representation by league ==
| Country | Players | Percent | Outside national squad |
|---|---|---|---|
| Total | 704 | | |
| England | 74 | 10.51% | 52 |
| Italy | 70 | 9.94% | 50 |
| Spain | 70 | 9.94% | 48 |
| Germany | 53 | 7.53% | 35 |
| Japan | 30 | 4.26% | 8 |
| France | 29 | 4.12% | 20 |
| Mexico | 26 | 3.69% | 5 |
| Netherlands | 23 | 3.27% | 13 |
| Saudi Arabia | 22 | 3.13% | 0 |
| Argentina | 21 | 2.98% | 14 |
| United States | 21 | 2.98% | 5 |
| Others | 298 | 42.33% | |

The English, Spanish, Japanese and Saudi Arabian squads were made up entirely of players from the respective countries' domestic leagues. The Nigeria squad was made up entirely of players employed by foreign clubs. Only three teams, Japan, Mexico, and Saudi Arabia, had no players from European clubs.

Although Turkey and Portugal failed to qualify for the finals, their domestic leagues were represented by 18 and 9 players, respectively. Altogether, there were 38 national leagues who had players in the tournament.

== Coaches representation by country ==
| Nº | Country | Coaches |
|---|---|---|
| 4 | Brazil | Paulo César Carpegiani (Paraguay), Carlos Alberto Parreira (Saudi Arabia), Renê Simões (Jamaica), Mário Zagallo |
| 4 | France | Aimé Jacquet, Henri Michel (Morocco), Claude Le Roy (Cameroon), Philippe Troussier (South Africa) |
| 2 | (Federal Republic of Yugoslavia) FR Yugoslavia | Bora Milutinović (Nigeria), Slobodan Santrač |
| 2 | South Korea | Cha Bum-kun, Kim Pyung-seok |
| 1 | Argentina | Daniel Passarella |
| 1 | Austria | Herbert Prohaska |
| 1 | Belgium | Georges Leekens |
| 1 | Bulgaria | Hristo Bonev |
| 1 | Colombia | Hernán Darío Gómez |
| 1 | Croatia | Miroslav Blažević |
| 1 | England | Glenn Hoddle |
| 1 | Germany | Berti Vogts |
| 1 | Iran | Jalal Talebi |
| 1 | Italy | Cesare Maldini |
| 1 | Japan | Takeshi Okada |
| 1 | Mexico | Manuel Lapuente |
| 1 | Netherlands | Guus Hiddink |
| 1 | Norway | Egil Olsen |
| 1 | Poland | Henryk Kasperczak (Tunisia) |
| 1 | Romania | Anghel Iordănescu |
| 1 | Saudi Arabia | Mohammed Al-Kharashy |
| 1 | Scotland | Craig Brown |
| 1 | Spain | Javier Clemente |
| 1 | Sweden | Bo Johansson (Denmark) |
| 1 | Tunisia | Ali Selmi |
| 1 | United States | Steve Sampson |
| 1 | Uruguay | Nelson Acosta (Chile) |
