= 1998 FIFA World Cup Group G =

Football tournament group stage

At the 1998 FIFA World Cup, the 32 teams were divided into eight groups of four, labelled A–H. The four teams in Group G were England, Romania, Colombia and Tunisia. With wins in their first two games against Colombia and England, followed by a draw against Tunisia, Romania won the group and qualified for the round of 16. England and Colombia were level on points before they played each other in their final match, each having defeated Tunisia and lost to Romania. England, with a better goal difference, only required a draw to advance. They won the match to take the second qualifying place.

== Standings ==
Pos	Team	Pld	W	D	L	GF	GA	GD	Pts	Qualification
1	Romania	3	2	1	0	4	2	+2	7	Advance to knockout stage
2	England	3	2	0	1	5	2	+3	6	Advance to knockout stage
3	Colombia	3	1	0	2	1	3	−2	3	
4	Tunisia	3	0	1	2	1	4	−3	1	

Source: FIFA
- Romania advanced to play Croatia (runner-up of Group H) in the round of 16.
- England advanced to play Argentina (winner of Group H) in the round of 16.

== Matches ==
=== England vs Tunisia ===
15 June 1998
14:30 CEST (UTC+2)

England	2–0	Tunisia
Shearer 42'; Scholes 89'

Stade Vélodrome, Marseille
Attendance: 55,000
Referee: Masayoshi Okada (Japan)

England	Tunisia

GK	1	David Seaman
CB	2	Sol Campbell	(yellow card) 88'
CB	6	Gareth Southgate
CB	5	Tony Adams
RWB	14	Darren Anderton
CM	4	Paul Ince
CM	8	David Batty
LWB	3	Graeme Le Saux
AM	16	Paul Scholes
SS	10	Teddy Sheringham		(substituted off) 85'
CF	9	Alan Shearer (c)
Substitutions:
FW	20	Michael Owen		(substituted on) 85'
Manager:
Glenn Hoddle

GK	1	Chokri El Ouaer
RWB	5	Hatem Trabelsi		(substituted off) 79'
CB	3	Sami Trabelsi (c)
CB	4	Mounir Boukadida
CB	21	Khaled Badra
LWB	17	José Clayton	(yellow card) 48'
MF	10	Kaïs Ghodhbane	(yellow card) 87'
MF	14	Sirajeddine Chihi
MF	15	Skander Souayah		(substituted off) 46'
FW	11	Adel Sellimi
FW	18	Mehdi Ben Slimane		(substituted off) 65'
Substitutions:
MF	8	Zoubeir Baya		(substituted on) 46'
FW	2	Imed Ben Younes	(yellow card) 70'	(substituted on) 65'
DF	7	Tarek Thabet		(substituted on) 79'
Manager:
(Poland) Henryk Kasperczak

Assistant referees:
Jeom Young Hyun (South Korea)
Dramane Dante (Mali)
Fourth official:
Kim Milton Nielsen (Denmark)

=== Romania vs Colombia ===
This fixture was a repeat of the two teams' opening match at the 1994 tournament, also won by Romania.

15 June 1998
17:30 CEST (UTC+2)

Romania	1–0	Colombia
Ilie 45+1'

Stade de Gerland, Lyon
Attendance: 39,100
Referee: Lim Kee Chong (Mauritius)

Romania	Colombia

GK	12	Bogdan Stelea
SW	6	Gheorghe Popescu
CB	18	Iulian Filipescu	(yellow card) 54'
CB	13	Liviu Ciobotariu
RWB	2	Dan Petrescu	(yellow card) 78'
LWB	8	Dorinel Munteanu	(yellow card) 69'
CM	5	Constantin Gâlcă
CM	16	Gabriel Popescu		(substituted off) 68'
AM	10	Gheorghe Hagi (c)		(substituted off) 76'
CF	9	Viorel Moldovan		(substituted off) 84'
CF	11	Adrian Ilie
Substitutions:
MF	19	Ovidiu Stîngă		(substituted on) 68'
MF	15	Lucian Marinescu		(substituted on) 76'
MF	14	Radu Niculescu		(substituted on) 84'
Manager:
Anghel Iordănescu

GK	22	Faryd Mondragón
DF	3	Ever Palacios
DF	4	José Santa	(yellow card) 47'
DF	5	Jorge Bermúdez
DF	13	Wílmer Cabrera
MF	6	Mauricio Serna
MF	8	Harold Lozano
MF	10	Carlos Valderrama (c)
MF	19	Freddy Rincón
FW	11	Faustino Asprilla		(substituted off) 84'
FW	15	Víctor Aristizábal		(substituted off) 46'
Substitutions:
FW	9	Adolfo Valencia		(substituted on) 46'
FW	21	Léider Preciado		(substituted on) 84'
Manager:
Hernán Dario Gómez

Assistant referees:
Mohamed Al Musawi (Oman)
Halim Abdul Hamid (Malaysia)
Fourth official:
Urs Meier (Switzerland)

=== Colombia vs Tunisia ===
22 June 1998
17:30 CEST (UTC+2)

Colombia	1–0	Tunisia
Preciado 83'

Stade de la Mosson, Montpellier
Attendance: 29,800
Referee: Bernd Heynemann (Germany)

Colombia	Tunisia

GK	22	Faryd Mondragón
DF	3	Ever Palacios
DF	4	José Santa	(yellow card) 18'
DF	5	Jorge Bermúdez
DF	13	Wílmer Cabrera
MF	6	Mauricio Serna		(substituted off) 62'
MF	8	Harold Lozano
MF	10	Carlos Valderrama (c)
MF	19	Freddy Rincón		(substituted off) 56'
FW	7	Antony de Ávila
FW	9	Adolfo Valencia		(substituted off) 56'
Substitutions:
FW	21	Léider Preciado		(substituted on) 56'
FW	15	Víctor Aristizábal		(substituted on) 56'
MF	14	Jorge Bolaño		(substituted on) 62'
Manager:
Hernán Darío Gómez

GK	1	Chokri El Ouaer
RB	3	Sami Trabelsi (c)
CB	6	Ferid Chouchane
CB	7	Tarek Thabet		(substituted off) 76'
LB	17	José Clayton	(yellow card) 83'
MF	8	Zoubeir Baya		(substituted off) 73'
MF	13	Riadh Bouazizi	(yellow card) 16'
MF	14	Sirajeddine Chihi
MF	15	Skander Souayah
FW	11	Adel Sellimi		(substituted off) 68'
FW	18	Mehdi Ben Slimane
Substitutions:
FW	2	Imed Ben Younes		(substituted on) 68'
MF	19	Faysal Ben Ahmed		(substituted on) 73'
MF	10	Kaïs Ghodhbane		(substituted on) 76'
Manager:
(Poland) Henryk Kasperczak

Assistant referees:
Erich Schneider (Germany)
Evžen Amler (Czech Republic)
Fourth official:
László Vágner (Hungary)

=== Romania vs England ===
22 June 1998
21:00 CEST (UTC+2)

Romania	2–1	England
Moldovan 46'; Petrescu 90'		Owen 81'

Stade de Toulouse, Toulouse
Attendance: 33,500
Referee: Marc Batta (France)

Romania	England

GK	12	Bogdan Stelea
SW	6	Gheorghe Popescu	(yellow card) 47'
CB	18	Iulian Filipescu	(yellow card) 88'
CB	13	Liviu Ciobotariu	(yellow card) 78'
RWB	2	Dan Petrescu
LWB	8	Dorinel Munteanu
CM	5	Constantin Gâlcă
CM	16	Gabriel Popescu
AM	10	Gheorghe Hagi (c)	(yellow card) 4'	(substituted off) 72'
CF	9	Viorel Moldovan		(substituted off) 86'
CF	11	Adrian Ilie
Substitutes:
MF	19	Ovidiu Stîngă		(substituted on) 72'	(substituted off) 81'
MF	15	Lucian Marinescu			(substituted on) 81'
FW	7	Marius Lăcătuș		(substituted on) 86'
Manager:
Anghel Iordănescu

GK	1	David Seaman
CB	12	Gary Neville
CB	2	Sol Campbell
CB	5	Tony Adams
RWB	14	Darren Anderton
LWB	3	Graeme Le Saux
CM	4	Paul Ince	(substituted off) 32'
CM	8	David Batty
AM	16	Paul Scholes
CF	10	Teddy Sheringham	(substituted off) 72'
CF	9	Alan Shearer (c)
Substitutions:
MF	7	David Beckham	(substituted on) 32'
FW	20	Michael Owen	(substituted on) 72'
Manager:
Glenn Hoddle

Assistant referees:
Jacques Poudevigne (France)
Aristidis Chris Soldatos (South Africa)
Fourth official:
Said Belqola (Morocco)

=== Colombia vs England ===
26 June 1998
21:00 CEST (UTC+2)

Colombia	0–2	England
		Anderton 20'; Beckham 29'

Stade Félix-Bollaert, Lens
Attendance: 38,100
Referee: Arturo Brizio Carter (Mexico)

Colombia	England

GK	22	Faryd Mondragón
DF	13	Wílmer Cabrera
DF	5	Jorge Bermúdez	(yellow card) 89'
DF	3	Ever Palacios
DF	16	Luis Antonio Moreno
MF	6	Mauricio Serna	(yellow card) 20'	(substituted off) 46'
MF	19	Freddy Rincón
MF	8	Harold Lozano
AM	10	Carlos Valderrama (c)
FW	7	Antony de Ávila		(substituted off) 46'
FW	21	Léider Preciado		(substituted off) 46'
Substitutes:
FW	9	Adolfo Valencia		(substituted on) 46'
FW	15	Víctor Aristizábal	(yellow card) 86'	(substituted on) 46'
FW	20	Hámilton Ricard		(substituted on) 46'
Manager:
Hernán Darío Gómez

GK	1	David Seaman
CB	12	Gary Neville
CB	2	Sol Campbell
CB	5	Tony Adams
RWB	14	Darren Anderton		(substituted off) 79'
LWB	3	Graeme Le Saux
CM	7	David Beckham
CM	4	Paul Ince		(substituted off) 83'
AM	16	Paul Scholes	(yellow card) 22'	(substituted off) 73'
CF	20	Michael Owen
CF	9	Alan Shearer (c)	(yellow card) 89'
Substitutions:
MF	11	Steve McManaman		(substituted on) 73'
MF	17	Rob Lee		(substituted on) 79'
MF	8	David Batty		(substituted on) 83'
Manager:
Glenn Hoddle

Assistant referees:
Laurent Rausis (Switzerland)
Reynaldo Salinas (Honduras)
Fourth official:
Ryszard Wojcik (Poland)

=== Romania vs Tunisia ===
26 June 1998
21:00 CEST (UTC+2)

Romania	1–1	Tunisia
Moldovan 71'		Souayah 12' (pen.)

Stade de France, Saint-Denis
Attendance: 77,000
Referee: Eddie Lennie (Australia)

Romania	Tunisia

GK	12	Bogdan Stelea
SW	4	Anton Doboș
CB	3	Cristian Dulca	(substituted off) 32'
CB	13	Liviu Ciobotariu
RWB	2	Dan Petrescu
LWB	8	Dorinel Munteanu
CM	15	Lucian Marinescu
CM	5	Constantin Gâlcă
CM	17	Ilie Dumitrescu	(substituted off) 68'
AM	10	Gheorghe Hagi (c)
CF	7	Marius Lăcătuș	(substituted off) 46'
Substitutions:
DF	6	Gheorghe Popescu	(substituted on) 32'
FW	11	Adrian Ilie	(substituted on) 46'
FW	9	Viorel Moldovan	(substituted on) 68'
Manager:
Anghel Iordănescu

GK	1	Chokri El Ouaer
DF	3	Sami Trabelsi (c)
DF	4	Mounir Boukadida
DF	6	Ferid Chouchane
MF	8	Zoubeir Baya	(yellow card) 28'
MF	10	Kaïs Ghodhbane		(substituted off) 85'
MF	13	Riadh Bouazizi
MF	14	Sirajeddine Chihi
MF	15	Skander Souayah	(yellow card) 57'	(substituted off) 90+1'
FW	11	Adel Sellimi
FW	18	Mehdi Ben Slimane		(substituted off) 60'
Substitutions:
FW	9	Riadh Jelassi		(substituted on) 60'
DF	7	Tarek Thabet		(substituted on) 85'
FW	2	Imed Ben Younes		(substituted on) 90+1'
Manager:
Ali Selmi

Assistant referees:
Jacek Pocięgiel (Poland)
Yuri Dupanov (Belarus)
Fourth official:
Ramesh Ramdhan (Trinidad and Tobago)

== See also ==
- Colombia at the FIFA World Cup
- England at the FIFA World Cup
- Romania at the FIFA World Cup
- Tunisia at the FIFA World Cup
