= 1999 CAF Super Cup =

| ASEC Mimosas | Espérance |
| (Ivory Coast) | (Tunisia) |
| 3 | 1 |
- (After extra time)
- Date: 7 February 1999
- Venue: Stade Houphouët-Boigny, Abidjan
- Referee: Gamal Al-Ghandour (Egypt)
- Attendance: 20,000

The 1999 CAF Super Cup was the seventh CAF Super Cup, an annual football match organized by the Confederation of African Football (CAF), between the winners of the previous season's CAF Champions League and African Cup Winners' Cup competitions. The match was contested by 1998 CAF Champions League winners, ASEC Mimosas, and 1998 African Cup Winners' Cup winners, Espérance, at the Stade Félix Houphouët-Boigny in Abidjan, Côte d'Ivoire, on 7 February 2009.

After the regular 90 minutes ended in a 1–1 draw, Ivorian side ASEC Mimosas won the match 3–1 in extra time. This was the first title for ASEC and only the second Super Cup title won by Ivorian clubs, after Africa Sports (also based in Abidjan) won the first edition in 1993. As for Tunisian side Espérance, this was their second final, after they had won the 1995 Super Cup.

== Teams ==
| Team | Qualification | Previous participation (bold indicates winners) |
|---|---|---|
| (Ivory Coast) ASEC Mimosas | 1998 CAF Champions League winner | None |
| (Tunisia) Espérance | 1998 African Cup Winners' Cup winner | **1995** |

== Match details ==
7 February 1999

| ASEC Mimosas (Ivory Coast) | 3 – 1 (a.e.t.) | (Tunisia) Espérance |
|---|---|---|
| Zézé 36', 120'; Dindane 96' | (Report) | El Ouaer 88' (pen.) |

Stade Houphouët-Boigny, Abidjan
Attendance: 20,000
Referee: Gamal Al-Ghandour (Egypt)

| **ASEC Mimosas** | **Espérance** |

ASEC MIMOSAS:
GK | (Ivory Coast) Boubacar Barry
DF | (Ivory Coast) Seydou Kanté
DF | (Ivory Coast) Kolo Touré
DF | (Ivory Coast) Didier Zokora
DF | (Ivory Coast) Siaka Tiéné
DF | (Ivory Coast) Gilles Yapi Yapo
MF | (Ivory Coast) Wognonwon Péhé | (substituted off) 45'
MF | (Ivory Coast) Abdoulaye Djire | Booked
MF | (Ivory Coast) Mamadou Dansoko
MF | (Ivory Coast) Antonin Koutouan | (substituted off) 70'
FW | (Ivory Coast) Venance Zézé
Substitutes:
DF | (Ivory Coast) Sékou Tidiane | (substituted on) 45'
FW | (Ivory Coast) Aruna Dindane | (substituted on) 70'
Manager:
(Argentina) Oscar Fulloné

ESPERANCE:
| GK | (Tunisia) Chokri El Ouaer |
| DF | (Tunisia) Tarek Thabet |
| DF | (Tunisia) Walid Azaiez |
| DF | (Tunisia) Khaled Badra |
| DF | (Tunisia) Radhi Jaïdi | (yellow card) 7' |
| MF | (Tunisia) Sirajeddine Chihi |
| MF | (Tunisia) Sofiane Melliti |
| MF | (Tunisia) Maher Kanzari |
| MF | (Tunisia) Faysal Ben Ahmed | (yellow card) 5' |
| FW | (Nigeria) Gabriel Okolosi |
| FW | (Nigeria) Edith Agoye |
Manager:
(Tunisia) Youssef Zouaoui

CAF Super Cup 1999

**ASEC Mimosas**
**First Title**

== See also ==
- 1998 CAF Champions League
- 1998 African Cup Winners' Cup
