= Chihi =

Chihi is a surname. Notable people with the surname include:

- Adil Chihi (born 1988), German-born Moroccan footballer
- Bibya Chihi (born 1952), Tunisian politician
- Jamila Chihi, Tunisian actress
- Sirajeddine Chihi (born 1970), Tunisian footballer
