= Péhé (surname) =

Péhé is a surname. Notable people with the surname include:

- Wognonwon Georcelin Péhé (born 1980), Ivorian football player
