= Souayah =

Souayah is a surname. Notable people with the surname include:

- Ammar Souayah (born 1957), Tunisian football manager
- Skander Souayah (born 1972), Tunisian footballer
