= Morula (disambiguation) =

A morula is a type of early-stage embryo.

Morula may also refer to:

- Lebogang Morula (born 1968), a South African football player
- Morula (gastropod), a genus of snails
