= Marco Knaller =

Austrian footballer

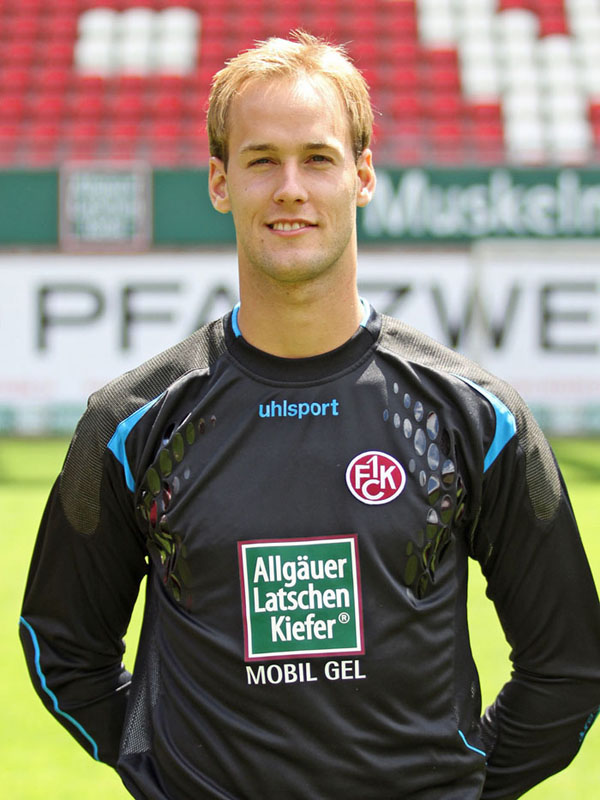
- Knaller with 1. FC Kaiserslautern in 2011

Personal information
- Date of birth: 26 March 1987 (age 39)
- Place of birth: Villach, Austria
- Height: 1.92 m (6 ft 4 in)
- Position: Goalkeeper

Youth career
- 1992–2005: Admira Wacker

Senior career*
Years	Team	Apps	(Gls)
2005–2007	Admira Wacker	33	(0)
2007–2008	FC Lustenau	5	(0)
2009–2012	1. FC Kaiserslautern II	65	(0)
2009–2012	1. FC Kaiserslautern	0	(0)
2012–2013	Wolfsberger AC	0	(0)
2013–2017	SV Sandhausen	72	(0)
2017–2020	FC Ingolstadt	14	(0)
2020–2022	Wacker Innsbruck	44	(0)
2022–2025	Austria Klagenfurt	8	(0)

International career
- Austria U-21
- * Club domestic league appearances and goals as of 27 December 2024

Marco Knaller (born 26 March 1987) is an Austrian goalkeeper.

== Personal life ==
His father Wolfgang Knaller played as a goalkeeper, including for Austria national team.
