= Walter Knaller =

Austrian footballer

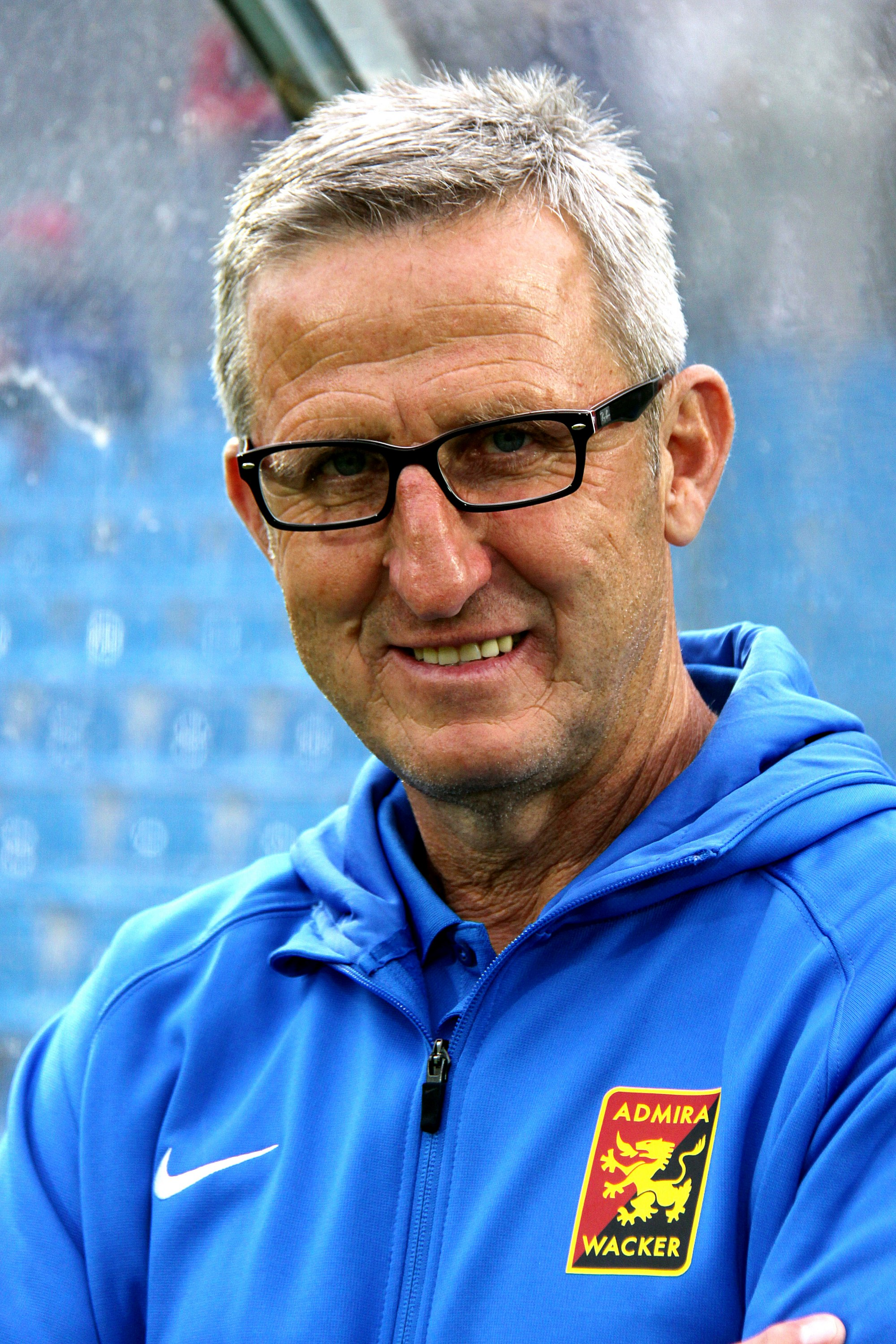
- Knaller in 2014

Personal information
- Date of birth: 24 October 1957 (age 69)
- Place of birth: Waiern, Austria
- Height: 1.90 m (6 ft 3 in)
- Position: Striker

Senior career*
Years	Team	Apps	(Gls)
1975–1976	SV Feldkirchen		
1976–1980	SV Sankt Veit/Glan		
1980–1990	Admira Wacker	214	(123)
1990–1991	Stahl Linz		
1992	VfB Mödling		
1993	Kremser SC		

Managerial career
- 1992: Admira Wacker (assistant)
- 1993–1995: FC Blau-Weiß Linz
- 1995–1996: Admira Wacker
- 1997–1998: FC Austria/VSV
- 2000–2001: Admira Wacker II
- 2002: Admira Wacker
- 2008–2013: Admira Wacker (youth)
- 2013–2015: Admira Wacker
- 2015–: Rapid Wien II (youth)
- * Club domestic league appearances and goals

Walter Knaller (born 24 October 1957) is an Austrian football manager and former player. He is the older brother of fellow footballer Wolfgang Knaller.
