= Kim Pyung-seok =

South Korean footballer and manager

Personal information
- Date of birth: 22 September 1958 (age 68)
- Place of birth: South Korea
- Height: 1.77 m (5 ft 10 in)
- Position: Defender

Team information
- Current team: Soongsil University

Youth career
- 1981–1982: Kwangwoon University

Senior career*
Years	Team	Apps	(Gls)
1983–1988	Hyundai Horang-i	83	(0)
1989–1990	Yukong Elephants	41	(0)
Total		124	(0)

International career^{‡}
1983–1987	South Korea	27	(0)

Managerial career
- 1995: Hyundai Horang-i (Coach)
- 1996–1999: Incheon Steel WFC
- 1997–1998: South Korea (Coach)
- 2000–2001: Kwangwoon Technical High School
- 2001–2004: Kim Pyung-seok Youth Academy
- 2005: Uirim Technical High School
- 2005–2006: Daeyang Electronic Information High School
- 2006–2007: Cheonan Air & Correspondence High School
- 2008–: Soongsil University (Professor)
Medal record
Representing South Korea
Men's football
Asian Games
Gold medal – first place	1986 Seoul	Team
- * Club domestic league appearances and goals as of 7 October 2008 ‡ National team caps and goals as of 7 October 2008

- Kim Pyung-seok
- Hangul: 김평석
- Hanja: 金平錫
- RR: Gim Pyeongseok
- MR: Kim P'yŏngsŏk

Kim Pyung-seok (Korean: 김평석; born 22 September 1958) is retired football player and manager.

He played in K League side Hyundai Horang-i and Yukong Elephants in South Korea.

== Early life ==
He started football when he was high school student. He graduated from Yeoido High School, but since the school did not have a football team, he enrolled in another high school, namely Kwangwoon Electronic Technical High School.

He graduated from Kwangwoon Electronic Technical High School, he failed to entrance into a school. He joined the now defunct Nong Hyup FC and played. Two years later, he joined the navy for military duty, and then joined navy football team.

After he was discharged from military service in October 1981, he entered Kwangwoon University. When he was sophomore, his team won the university championship tournament.

== Playing career ==
He left university without graduating when his team won the championship, he joined K League side Hyundai Horang-i. He played for Hyundai Horang-i in K League, he appeared in 83 games. In 1989, he moved to Yukong Elephants and one year later he retired.

His main position was left full back and sometimes played as a central defender and central midfielder. He was member of South Korea in 1983–1987.

== Managerial career ==
He participated 1998 FIFA World Cup for South Korea coach. But he managed to last game of South Korea due to manager Cha Bum-kun was replacement by defeat against Netherlands resulted 0–5. Last game against Belgium resulted draw by 1–1.

Come back to South Korea, he managed high school football team quite long. Also he coached Cha Bum-kun Youth Academy. From 1996 to 1999, he managed South Korean women's football team that Incheon Steel WFC.

== Club career statistics ==
All-Time Club Performance
Club	Season	League			League Cup			AFC Champions League			Total
Club	Season	Apps	Goals	Assists	Apps	Goals	Assists	Apps	Goals	Assists	Apps	Goals	Assists
Hyundai Horang-i	1984	28	0	5	—		—		—		28	0	5
Hyundai Horang-i	1985	10	0	0	—		—		—		10	0	0
Hyundai Horang-i	1986	10	0	2	3	0	—		—		13	0	2
Hyundai Horang-i	1987	27	0	2	—		—		—		27	0	2
Hyundai Horang-i	1988	8	0	0	—		—		—		8	0	0
Hyundai Horang-i	Total	83	0	9	3	0	—		—		86	0	9
Yukong Elephants	1989	21	0	0	—		—		—		21	0	0
Yukong Elephants	1990	20	0	0	—		—		—		20	0	0
Yukong Elephants	Total	41	0	0	—		—		—		41	0	0
Career totals		124	0	9	3	0	—		—		127	0	9
