= Wolfgang Knaller =

Austrian footballer

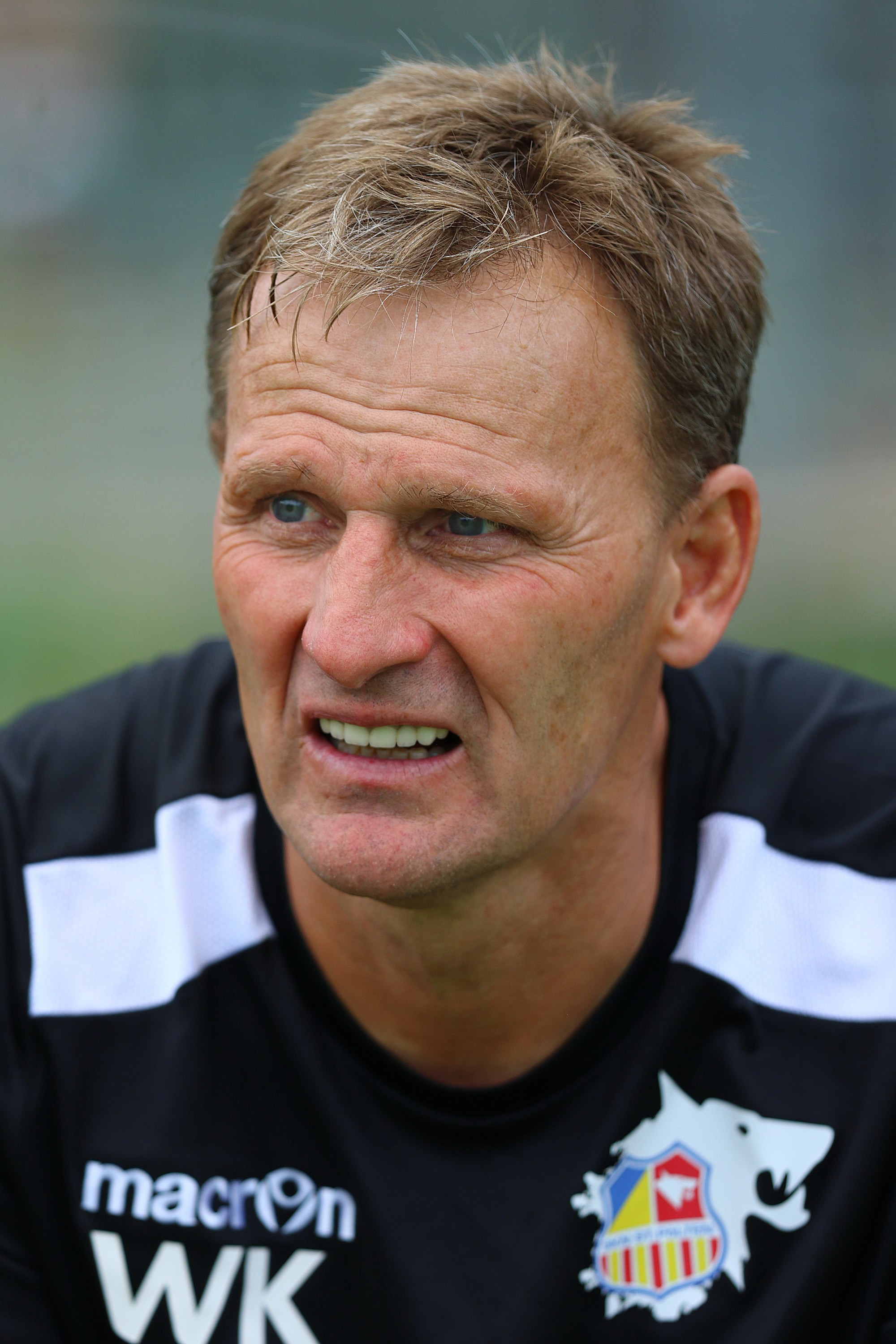

Personal information
- Full name: Wolfgang Knaller
- Date of birth: 9 October 1961 (age 65)
- Place of birth: Feldkirchen, Austria
- Height: 1.86 m (6 ft 1 in)
- Position: Goalkeeper

Youth career
- SV Feldkirchen

Senior career*
| Years | Team | Apps | (Gls) |
| 1980–1982 | SV Feldkirchen | | |
| 1982–1987 | SV Spittal/Drau | 152 | (0) |
| 1987–1996 | Admira Wacker | 306 | (0) |
| 1996–2002 | Austria Wien | 135 | (0) |
| 2002–2004 | VfB Admira Wacker Mödling | 47 | (0) |
| 2005–2006 | LASK | 28 | (0) |
| 2006–2007 | FC Waidhofen/Ybbs | 24 | (0) |
| 2008 | ASK Baumgarten | 10 | (0) |
| Total | | 702 | (0) |

International career
| 1991–1996 | Austria | 4 | (0) |
- * Club domestic league appearances and goals

Wolfgang Knaller (born 9 October 1961) is an Austrian footballer who played as a goalkeeper.

== Club career ==
Knaller started his Austrian Football Bundesliga career with SV Spittal an der Drau in 1984 and has played professionally for over 20 years. In 2006, he joined lower league FC Waidhofen/Ybbs and in 2007 he moved to ASK Baumgarten.

== International career ==
He made his debut for Austria in an October 1991 European championship qualification against Northern Ireland and was a participant at the 1998 FIFA World Cup. He earned 4 caps. His last international was a May 1996 friendly match against the Czech Republic.

== Personal life ==
Knaller was born in Waiern, Feldkirchen in Kärnten. His brother Walter, a striker, scored 126 Austrian Bundesliga goals from 1980 through 1992. His son Marco is also a goalkeeper.
