= Bibya Chihi =

Tunisian politician

Bibya Chihi is a Tunisian politician. She was the Minister of Women, Family, Children, and Senior Citizens under former President Zine El Abidine Ben Ali. Prior to this, she was the CEO of the Société Nationale de Distribution des Produits Pétroliers.
