= Wognonwon Georcelin Péhé =

Ivorian footballer

Jocelynn Joss Péhé
Personal information
- Full name: Wognonwon Georcelin Péhé
- Date of birth: 10 August 1980 (age 46)
- Place of birth: Abidjan, Côte d'Ivoire
- Height: 1.64 m (5 ft 5 in)
- Position: Midfielder

Team information
- Current team: Stade d'Abidjan
- Number: 10

Youth career
- Académie de Sol Beni

Senior career*
Years	Team	Apps	(Gls)
2000–2001	ASEC Mimosas		
2001–2004	K.S.K. Beveren	39	(1)
2004–2008	Olympique Charleroi	93	(15)
2008–	Stade d'Abidjan		
- * Club domestic league appearances and goals

Wognonwon Georcelin Péhé (born 10 August 1980 in Abidjan) is an Ivorian football player who currently plays for Stade d'Abidjan.

== Career ==
He began his career by Académie de Sol Beni and joined 2000 to ASEC Mimosas, the club from Abidjan transferred him one year later in July 2001 to Satellite club K.S.K. Beveren. He played 3 years for Beveren, joined then in 2004 to R.O.C. de Charleroi-Marchienne and played there between of the end of his contract on 30 June 2008. His contract was terminated and he left the club and signed for Stade d'Abidjan.
