= Mounir Boukadida =

Tunisian footballer

Personal information
- Full name: Mounir Boukadida
- Date of birth: 24 October 1967 (age 59)
- Place of birth: Sousse, Tunisia
- Height: 1.85 m (6 ft 1 in)
- Position: Defender

Senior career*
Years	Team	Apps	(Gls)
1987–1999	Étoile Sportive du Sahel	182	(9)
1999–2003	SV Waldhof Mannheim	64	(0)
Total		246	(9)

International career
1992–2002	Tunisia	55	(4)
- * Club domestic league appearances and goals

Mounir Boukadida (Arabic: منير بوقديدة) (born 24 October 1967 in Sousse) is a former Tunisian football defender.

He was a member of the Tunisian national team at the 1998 FIFA World Cup. His only goal for the national team was in a 1996 friendly match against Egypt.

His daughter Myriem is a model for the fashion brand Guess.
