= Luis Antonio Moreno =

Colombian footballer (born 1970)

Luis Antonio Moreno Huila (born December 25, 1970, in Jamundi) is a retired Colombian footballer, who played for a number of clubs, including América de Cali and Deportes Tolima.

He played for the Colombia national football team and was a participant at the 1998 FIFA World Cup.
