= Léider Preciado =

Colombian footballer (born 1977)

Personal information
- Full name: Léider Calimenio Preciado Guerrero
- Date of birth: 26 February 1977 (age 49)
- Place of birth: Tumaco, Nariño, Colombia
- Height: 1.81 m (5 ft 11 in)
- Position: Striker

Senior career*
Years	Team	Apps	(Gls)
1995–1996	El Cóndor		
1996–1997	Cúcuta Deportivo		
1998	Santa Fe		
1998–1999	Racing Santander	16	(2)
1999–2000	Toledo	11	(1)
2000–2001	Racing Santander	16	(3)
2001	Santa Fe	21	(15)
2002	Once Caldas	18	(9)
2002–2003	Deportivo Cali	68	(38)
2004	Santa Fe	28	(17)
2004–2005	Al Shabab		
2005–2008	Santa Fe	96	(46)
2008–2009	Deportivo Quito	25	(5)
2009	América de Cali	8	(1)
2010	Deportes Quindío	18	(8)
2011	Santa Fe	17	(2)

International career
1998–2007	Colombia	12	(4)
- * Club domestic league appearances and goals

Léider Calimenio Preciado Guerrero (born 26 February 1977) is a Colombian former professional football striker, who manages minor league teams (lower divisions) for Independiente Santa Fe.

== Club career ==
Preciado played for Independiente Santa Fe, Once Caldas, Racing Santander (Spain), CD Toledo (Spain), Deportivo Cali and Al Shabab (Saudi Arabia) as well as for one of the most popular clubs from Ecuador, Sociedad Deportivo Quito. He was part of their 2008 championship team.

Preciado is one of the most important Colombian strikers; he scored 108 goals for Independiente Santa Fe, 3 of them at the Copa libertadores de América in 2006, and more than 160 goals in his entire career. He was the top scorer of the second half of the Colombian Championship (Torneo Finalización) in 2003 and 2004.

On 26 April 2008, Preciado became one of the three leading scorers, besides Miguel Ángel Converti and Alfredo Castillo, in the history of the Bogotá Derby (Independiente Santa Fe vs Club Deportivo Los Millonarios), after scoring in Santa Fe's 2–0 victory over Millonarios. Preciado had 15 goals in this Derby, all of them with Santa Fe.

== International career ==
Preciado played for the Colombia national team and was a participant in the 1998 FIFA World Cup, where he scored one goal against the Tunisia national football team.
