= Ferid Chouchane =

Tunisian footballer

Personal information
- Full name: Ferid Chouchane
- Date of birth: 19 April 1973 (age 53)
- Place of birth: Sousse, Tunisia
- Height: 1.83 m (6 ft 0 in)
- Position: Defender

Senior career*
Years	Team	Apps	(Gls)
1990–1999	Étoile du Sahel		
1998–1999	Club Africain		
1999–2000	Al Rayyan SC		
2000–2002	Club Africain		
2002–2003	Al-Qadisiyah FC		

International career
1994–2001	Tunisia	27	(1)
- * Club domestic league appearances and goals

Ferid Chouchane (Arabic: فريد شوشان) (born 19 April 1973 in Sousse) is a retired Tunisian football defender. He played for Étoile du Sahel and Club Africain in Tunisia and had spells at Qatar and Saudi Arabia.

== International career ==
Chouchane made his debut for the national team in 1994 in a friendly match against Algeria, scoring the only goal of the match. He was a member of the Tunisian national team at the 1998 FIFA World Cup, starting 2 matches as a center back. His last international match was in 2001 against Gabon in the 2002 African Cup of Nations qualification.

== Managerial career ==
In 2010, Chouchane was appointed as assistant manager of Moroccan team Wydad Casablanca. One year later, he moved back to Tunisia to be assistant manager of Étoile du Sahel, becoming sporting director in 2012.
