= Lebogang Morula =

South African soccer player (1968–2024)

Personal information
- Full name: Lebogang Ghiba Morula
- Date of birth: 18 December 1966
- Place of birth: Brits, North West, South Africa
- Date of death: 7 August 2024 (aged 57)
- Height: 1.80 m (5 ft 11 in)
- Positions: Midfielder; forward

Senior career*
Years	Team	Apps	(Gls)
1991–1995	Jomo Cosmos		
1995	Once Caldas	1	(0)
1996	Aurich–Cañaña		(1+)
1997	Jomo Cosmos		
1997–1998	Vanspor	16	(1)
1998–2001	Jomo Cosmos		

International career
1998	South Africa	1	(0)
- * Club domestic league appearances and goals

Lebogang Ghiba Morula (sometimes spelt Lebohang) (22 December 1968 – 7 August 2024) was a South African soccer player who played as a midfielder or forward.

== Club career ==
Morula started his career at Jomo Cosmos in South Africa and moved in 1995 to Colombian club Once Caldas with fellow South African footballer Teboho Moloi in a "pay as you play" contract. He made his debut against Deportes Quindío becoming the first African player to appear in the Categoría Primera A. However, he disliked the contract based on appearances and left the club after playing only 20 minutes.

In 1996, he was brought to Peru by former South Africa manager Augusto Palacios to play for Aurich–Cañaña, ending the season relegated from the 1996 Torneo Descentralizado.

In 1997, Morula returned to Jomo Cosmos, scoring once in the Rothmans Cup against AmaZulu. He joined Turkish club Vanspor in December, playing 16 Süper Lig matches and scoring once against Kocaelispor, but could not avoid ending at the bottom at the table and left the club after the end of the season. He returned to Jomo Cosmos as a player-assistant before ending his career in 2001.

== International career ==
Morula acquired Peruvian citizenship by the time he played at Juan Aurich, but opted to play for the South Africa national team. He appeared once in a friendly match against Iceland and was a member of the squad that travelled to France for the 1998 FIFA World Cup.

== Personal life ==
Morula was born in Brits, North West.

His son Karol Josep Lebogang Bernal was born in Peru and is a right-back, having trained with the Peru U23 national team.

Morula was arrested for many crimes such as hijacking, stealing cars generators and electronic goods, ATM robbery, and armed robbery. He was also convicted of malicious damage to property back in 1986 and theft in 2004.

He also faced controversy in his second marriage in 2014 when his bride's mother and two of his sons attempted to stop the wedding stating he was still married to his legal wife, who was on her deathbed. It was also stated that his new wife had a boyfriend and that he struck Morula with a buttstock later in the same night.

== Death ==
He was shot and killed near his family home in Moumong, Mmaku, South Africa, on 7 August 2024.
