= Imed Ben Younes =

Tunisian footballer and coach

Personal information
- Date of birth: 16 June 1974 (age 52)
- Place of birth: Sfax, Tunisia
- Height: 1.74 m (5 ft 9 in)
- Position: Forward

Team information
- Current team: (manager)

Senior career*
Years	Team	Apps	(Gls)
1993–1995	Sfax Railways Sports		
1995–1998	ES Sahel		
1998–2002	CS Sfaxien		
2002–2003	Al-Wakrah		
2003	ES Tunis		
2004–2005	EOG Kram		
2008–2009	Sfax Railways Sports		

International career
1996	Tunisia U23	2	(0)
1995–2002	Tunisia	13	(7)

Managerial career
- 2017–2018: ES Tunis (assistant)
- 2018: ES Sahel (assistant)
- 2018–2019: Sfax Railways Sports
- 2019–2020: ES Sahel (assistant)
- 2020: ES Sahel
- 2020–2021: Wydad (assistant)
- 2022: Raja Casablanca (assistant)
- 2022–2023: US Monastir (assistant)
- 2023: US Monastir
- 2023–2024: ES Sahel
- 2024: Olympique Béja
- 2024: CA Bizertin
- 2024–2026: ES Métlaoui
- * Club domestic league appearances and goals

Imed Ben Younes (Arabic: عماد بن يونس; born 16 June 1974) is a Tunisian former football player and current head coach.

He played for a few clubs in Tunisia including Étoile Sahel and CS Sfaxien and played a single season at Qatari club Al-Wakrah. After retiring in 2005, he returned in 2008 to play for Sfax Railways Sports, his first professional football club.

== International career ==
Ben Younes played for the Tunisia national team and was a participant at the 1998 FIFA World Cup, appearing as a substitute in the three matches that Tunisia played. He also played for Tunisia at the 1996 Summer Olympics. His last international match was a friendly against Slovenia.

== Career statistics ==
#	Date	Venue	Opponent	Score	Result	Competition
1	19 January 1996	EPRU Stadium, Port Elizabeth, South Africa	Ghana	1–1	1–2	1996 African Cup of Nations
2	25 January 1996	EPRU Stadium, Port Elizabeth, South Africa	Ivory Coast	1–0	3–1	1996 African Cup of Nations
3	25 January 1996	EPRU Stadium, Port Elizabeth, South Africa	Ivory Coast	2–0	3–1	1996 African Cup of Nations
4	5 November 1997	Stade El Menzah, Tunis	Bosnia and Herzegovina	1–0	2–1	Friendly
5	5 November 1997	Stade El Menzah, Tunis	Bosnia and Herzegovina	2–0	2–1	Friendly
6	2 May 1998	Stade Olympique de Sousse, Sousse	Georgia	1–1	1–1	Friendly
7	6 June 1998	Stade El Menzah, Tunis	Wales	1–0	4–0	Friendly
