= Faysal Ben Ahmed =

Tunisian footballer

Personal information
- Full name: Faysal Ben Ahmed
- Date of birth: 7 March 1973 (age 53)
- Place of birth: Ariana, Tunisia
- Height: 1.77 m (5 ft 9 1/2 in)
- Positions: Defender; defensive midfielder

Senior career*
Years	Team	Apps	(Gls)
1992–1996	AS Ariana		
1996–2002	Espérance	147	(10)
2003	AS Djerba	8	(0)
2003–2004	CO Transports	17	(0)
2004–2005	AS Ariana	12	(1)

International career
1998–2000	Tunisia	9	(0)
- * Club domestic league appearances and goals

Faysal Ben Ahmed (Arabic: فيصل بن أحمد) (born 7 March 1973) is a Tunisian footballer who played as a defender or defensive midfielder, spending most of his career at hometown club AS Ariana and Espérance.

Ben Ahmed was in the Tunisia national football team for the 1998 FIFA World Cup and appeared as a substitute against Colombia.
