= Skander Souayah =

Tunisian former football player (born 1972)

Personal information
- Full name: Skander Souayah
- Date of birth: 20 November 1972 (age 53)
- Place of birth: Sfax, Tunisia
- Height: 1.77 m (5 ft 9 1/2 in)
- Position: Midfielder

Senior career*
Years	Team	Apps	(Gls)
1992–2001	CS Sfaxien	253	(28)
1999–2000	→ Al Ain FC (loan)		
2001–2005	Espérance Tunis	22	(4)
Total		275	(32)

International career
1994–2002	Tunisia	38	(7)
- * Club domestic league appearances and goals

Skander Souayah (Arabic: إسكندر السويح) (born 20 November 1972) is a Tunisian former football player who played for CS Sfaxien and Espérance Tunis.

He played for the Tunisia national football team, including at the 1998 FIFA World Cup, where he scored the only Tunisian goal of the competition from a penalty kick in the match against Romania.

Souayah received a six-month ban from FIFA's Disciplinary Committee following his positive doping test in March 2002.

== International goals ==
#	Date	Venue	Opponent	Score	Result	Competition
1	31 December 1993	Accra Sports Stadium, Accra	Ghana	1–1	1–1	Friendly
2	8 February 1994	Ta' Qali National Stadium, Attard	Malta	1–0	1–1	Rothmans International Tournament
3	6 October 1996	Stade El Menzah, Tunis	Sierra Leone	2–0	2–0	1998 African Cup of Nations qualification
4	7 August 1997	Stade El Menzah, Tunis	Zambia	2–0	3–1	1997 LG Cup
5	9 August 1997	Stade El Menzah, Tunis	Nigeria	1–0	2–0	1997 LG Cup final
6	17 August 1997	Stade El Menzah, Tunis	Namibia	2–0	4–0	1998 FIFA World Cup qualification
7	26 June 1998	Stade de France, Saint-Denis, France	Romania	1–0	1–1	1998 FIFA World Cup
