= Tarek Thabet =

Tunisian association football player

Personal information
- Date of birth: 16 August 1971 (age 55)
- Place of birth: Gabès, Tunisia
- Height: 1.76 m (5 ft 9 in)
- Position: Defender

Team information
- Current team: Espérance de Tunis (general supervisor)

Senior career*
Years	Team	Apps	(Gls)
1990–2004	Espérance de Tunis	349	(27)

International career
1992–2002	Tunisia	69	(3)

Managerial career
- 2005–2006: AS Gabès
- 2007–2008: Stade Gabèsien
- 2008: Wefaq Sabratha
- 2008–2009: Jendouba Sport
- 2009–2011: Khaleej Sirte
- 2011: ES Zarzis
- 2013–2014: Al-Ahly Benghazi
- 2014: Espérance de Tunis (assistant)
- 2015: EO Sidi Bouzid
- 2016: AS Kasserine
- 2016: Al-Ahly Benghazi
- 2016–2017: EO Sidi Bouzid
- 2017: AS Marsa
- 2017: Al-Nasr Benghazi
- 2018: AS Kasserine
- 2018: Salam Zgharta
- 2019: Al-Ahly Tripoli
- 2019–2020: US Ben Guerdane
- 2022: Olympic Azzaweya
- 2022–2023: Al Sadaqa
- 2023–2024: Espérance de Tunis
- * Club domestic league appearances and goals

Tarek Thabet (Arabic: طارق ثابت; born 16 August 1971), is a Tunisian former professional footballer who played as a defender for Espérance de Tunis and the Tunisia national team. At club level, he spent his entire career at Espérance de Tunis. He was a member of the Tunisian team during the World Cups in 1998 and 2002.

He managed Libyan Premier League club Khaleej Sirte, after spending the 2008–09 season at Wefaq Sabratha. Thabet also coached Libyan club Al-Ahly SC (Benghazi) as well as numerous Tunisian clubs.

== International goals ==
#	Date	Venue	Opponent	Score	Result	Competition
1	5 November 1993	Stade El Menzah, Tunis	Gabon	4–0	4–0	Coupe 7 Novembre
2	6 June 1999	Stade El Menzah, Tunis	Algeria	2–0	2–0	2000 African Cup of Nations qualification
3	7 October 2000	Stade El Menzah, Tunis	Gabon	4–2	4–2	2002 African Cup of Nations qualification
