= Sirajeddine Chihi =

Tunisian footballer

Personal information
- Full name: Sirajeddine Chihi
- Date of birth: 16 April 1970 (age 56)
- Place of birth: Hammam-Lif, Tunisia
- Height: 1.86 m (6 ft 1 in)
- Position: Defensive midfielder

Senior career*
Years	Team	Apps	(Gls)
1990–1993	CS Hammam-Lif		
1993–2001	Espérance Tunis		
2001–2002	Al-Ahli Dubai		
2002–2005	CS Hammam-Lif		
2005–2006	EGS Gafsa		

International career
1991–2001	Tunisia	85	(4)
- * Club domestic league appearances and goals

Sirajeddine Chihi (Arabic: سراج الدين الشيحي) (born 16 April 1970 in Hammam-Lif) is a retired Tunisian football player. He played most of his career for his hometown club CS Hammam-Lif and also for Espérance Tunis as a defensive midfielder.

He was part of the Tunisia national football team for a decade and was a participant at the 1998 FIFA World Cup, starting in all three of Tunisia's matches.

== International goals ==
#	Date	Venue	Opponent	Score	Result	Competition
1	27 November 1991	Stade El Menzah, Tunis	Ivory Coast	5–2	5–3	Friendly
2	5 November 1993	Stade El Menzah, Tunis	Gabon	1–0	4–0	Coupe 7 Novembre
3	5 November 1993	Stade El Menzah, Tunis	Gabon	2–0	4–0	Coupe 7 Novembre
4	2 January 1995	Stade Olympique de Sousse, Sousse	Egypt	1–0	2–0	Friendly
