= Algeria national football team records and statistics =

This list of Algeria national football team records contains statistical accomplishments related to the Algeria national football team (French: Equipe d'Algérie), its players, and its managers. The Algeria national team represents the nation of Algeria in international football. It is fielded by the Algerian Football Federation (French: Fédération algérienne de football) and competes as a member of Confederation of African Football.

== Records ==
=== Individual ===
Most appearances
Aïssa Mandi, 107, 5 March 2014 — present

Most appearances as a captain
Yazid Mansouri, 52, 5 June 2004 — 5 June 2010

Most goals
Islam Slimani, 45, 2012 —

Longest Algeria career
Djamel Menad, 15 years, 1 month and 30 days, (31 May 1980 — 30 July 1995)
Rabah Madjer, 13 years, 2 months and 20 days, (28 October 1978 — 17 January 1992)

Oldest player
Raïs M'Bolhi, 36 years, 6 months and 25 days, 19/11/2022, Sweden 2—0 Algeria.

Youngest player
Badredine Bouanani, 18 years, 3 months and 15 days, 23/03/2023, Algeria 2—1 Niger.

Most appearances at the World Cup finals
Rafik Halliche, 7, 13 June 2010 — 30 June 2014

Appearances at Two World Cup final tournaments
Lakhdar Belloumi, 1982 and 1986
Tedj Bensaoula, 1982 and 1986
Madjid Bougherra, 2010 and 2014
Mahmoud Guendouz, 1982 and 1986
Rafik Halliche, 2010 and 2014
Nourredine Kourichi, 1982 and 1986
Mehdi Lacen, 2010 and 2014
Raïs M'Bolhi, 2010 and 2014
Rabah Madjer, 1982 and 1986
Faouzi Mansouri, 1982 and 1986
Djamel Mesbah, 2010 and 2014
Hassan Yebda, 2010 and 2014
Djamel Zidane, 1982 and 1986

Most goals scored at the World Cup finals
Salah Assad, 2, 24 June 1982
Abdelmoumene Djabou, 2, 22 June 2014 — 30 June 2014
Islam Slimani, 2, 22 June 2014 — 26 June 2014

Most appearances at the African Championship finals
Rabah Madjer, 22, 9 March 1980 — 17 January 1992

Appearances at Six African Championship final tournaments
Rabah Madjer, 1980, 1982, 1984, 1986, 1990, and 1992
Mahieddine Meftah, 1990, 1992, 1996, 1998, 2000, 2002

Most goals scored at the African Championship finals
Lakhdar Belloumi, 6, 13 March 1980 — 26 March 1988
Riyad Mahrez, 6, 19 January 2015 — present

Most appearances on aggregate at the World Cup and African Championship finals
Rabah Madjer, 28, 9 March 1980 — 17 January 1992

Appearances in three different decades
Rabah Madjer, 1970s, 1980s, 1990s
Mahieddine Meftah, 1980s, 1990s, 2000s
Moussa Saïb, 1980s, 1990s, 2000s
Rafik Saïfi, 1990s, 2000s, 2010s

=== Manager ===
Most matches as coach
Rabah Saâdane, 74, 30 August 1981 — 3 September 2010

Most matches won as coach
26 by Djamel Belmadi

Most matches drawn as coach
21 by Rabah Saâdane

Most matches lost as coach
23 by Rabah Saâdane

Most goals scored as coach
90 by Djamel Belmadi

=== Team ===
Largest victory
15–1, South Yemen – Algeria, 17 August 1973

Largest away victory
0–6, Jordan – Algeria, 28 September 1974

Largest defeat
5–0, East Germany – Algeria, 21 April 1976

Largest home defeat
5–2, Algeria – Nigeria, 4 September 2005

Most consecutive victories
9, 26 May 1975 — 6 January 1976

Most consecutive matches without a defeat
35, October 2018 - January 2022

Most consecutive defeats

Most consecutive matches without a victory
11, 3 February 2004 — 17 November 2004

Longest period without conceding a goal

Highest home attendance
110,000, Algeria – Serbia, 3 March 2010

Highest away attendance
100,000, Iran – Algeria, 27 September 1991

=== Hat-tricks ===
As of 22 April 2021.

List of Algeria national football team hat-tricks
No.	Player	Opponent	Goals	Score	Venue	Competition	Date	Ref
1	Noureddine Hachouf	DR Congo	3 – (50', 67', 73')	4–1	Brazzaville	1965 All-Africa Games	20 July 1965	
2	Hacène Lalmas	Uganda	3 – (15', 25', 70')	4–0	Hailé Sélassié Stadium, Addis Ababa	1968 AFCON	14 January 1968	
3	Mokhtar Khalem	Morocco	3 – (46', 60', 80')	3–1	Stade 20 Août 1955, Algiers	1972 AFCON qualification	10 December 1970	
4	Nasreddine Akli	South Yemen	6 – (6', 16', 35', 55', 64', 65')	15–1	March 28 Stadium, Benghazi	1973 Palestine Cup of Nations	17 August 1973	
5	Tedj Bensaoula	Morocco	3 – (15', 16', 69')	1–5	Stade d'Honneur, Casablanca	1980 Summer Olympics qualifiers	9 December 1979	
6	Mohamed Rahem	Mali	3 – (8', 36', 42')	5–0	Paris	Friendly match	12 January 1990	
7	Abdelhafid Tasfaout	Senegal	3 – (3', 62', 76')	4–0	Stade Birouana, Tlemcen	1994 AFCON qualification	25 July 1993	
8	Islam Slimani	Djibouti	4 – (5', 25'p, 46', 53')	8–0	Mustapha Tchaker Stadium, Blida	2022 WC qualification	2 September 2021	

- ^{6} Player scored 6 goals

=== Doubles ===
44 players managed to score 2 goals in the same match. 17 have done it more than once, for a total of 82 doubles.

- 8 doubles: Islam Slimani
- 6 doubles: Abdelhafid Tasfaout
- 5 doubles: Riyad Mahrez
- 4 doubles: Baghdad Bounedjah, Rachid Dali, Rabah Madjer, Djamel Menad, Hillal Soudani
- 3 doubles: Sofiane Feghouli, Rafik Saïfi
- 2 doubled: Lakhdar Belloumi, Tedj Bensaoula, Yacine Brahimi, Aïssa Draoui, Ali Meçabih, Hamid Merakchi, Moussa Saïb

=== Fastest goals ===
As of September 30, 2017.

Goal	Player	Competition	Against	Home/Away	Result	Date
0.16'	Foued Kadir	2013 Africa Cup of Nations Qualifiers	Gambia	Home	4–1	15 June 2012
0.35'	Yacine Brahimi	2018 FIFA World Cup African Qualifiers	Tanzania	Home	7–0	17 November 2015
0.50'	Tedj Bensaoula	1984 Summer Olympics African Qualifiers	Egypt	Home	1–1	6 January 1984
0.50'	Yacine Brahimi	2015 Africa Cup of Nations Qualifiers	Malawi	Home	3–0	15 October 2014

8 players scored in the first minute of the game. It is :

- Mahieddine Safsafi on August 17, 1973 against South Yemen (1973 Palestine Cup of Nations)
- Salah Assad on October 28, 1978 against Zambia (Friendly)
- Lakhdar Belloumi on April 6, 1979 against Mali (1980 OG Qualifiers)
- Tedj Bensaoula on January 6, 1984 (50') against Egypt (1984 OG Qualifiers)
- Djamel Menad on February 25, 1986 against Mozambique (Friendly)
- Foued Kadir on June 15, 2012 (16') against Gambia (2013 Afcon Qualifiers)
- Yacine Brahimi on October 15, 2014 (48') against Malawi (2015 Afcon Qualifiers)
- Yacine Brahimi on November 17, 2015 (35') against Tanzania (2018 FIFA WC Qualifiers)

=== Biggest wins ===
Scores from 6–0 and up

Best Results by Algeria
	Date	Opponent	Round	Result	Difference
1	17 August 1973	South Yemen	(Libya) 1973 Palestine Cup	15 – 1	+14
2	10 May 1974	Mauritania	(Algeria) Friendly	9 – 1	+8
2	28 May 1975	Mauritania	(Algeria) Friendly	8 – 0	+8
2	2 September 2021	Djibouti	(Qatar) 2022 World Cup qualification	8 – 0	+8
3	30 August 1981	Burkina Faso	(Libya) 1982 AFCON qualification	7 – 0	+7
3	13 November 1988	Mali	(Algeria) Friendly	7 – 0	+7
3	17 November 2015	Tanzania	(Russia) 2018 World Cup qualification	7 – 0	+7
4	28 September 1974	Jordan	(Syria) Friendly	6 – 0	+6
4	26 May 1975	Libya	(Algeria) Friendly	6 – 0	+6
4	14 November 2003	Niger	(Germany) 2006 World Cup qualification	6 – 0	+6
4	4 September 2016	Lesotho	(Gabon) 2017 AFCON qualification	6 – 0	+6
4	25 March 2016	Ethiopia	(Gabon) 2017 AFCON qualification	7 – 1	+6

=== Heaviest defeats ===
Scores from 4–0 and up

Worst Results by Algeria
	Date	Opponent	Round	Result	Difference
1	21 April 1976	East Germany	(East Germany) Friendly	0 – 5	–5
2	12 March 1972	Guinea	(West Germany) 1974 World Cup qualification	1 – 5	–4
2	19 November 1980	Poland	(Poland) Friendly	1 – 5	–4
2	4 June 2011	Morocco	(Gabon) (Equatorial Guinea) 2012 AFCON qualification	0 – 4	–4
2	14 February 1973	Turkey	(Turkey) Friendly	0 – 4	–4
2	19 May 1975	Sweden	(Sweden) Friendly	0 – 4	–4
2	28 January 2010	Egypt	(Angola) 2010 Africa Cup of Nations	0 – 4	–4

=== Youngest player ===
Italics denotes players still playing club football, Bold denotes players still playing in the national team.

#	Name	Date of birth	Date of debut	Age	Opponent
1	Tahar Chérif El-Ouazzani	1966–10–7	1984–12–30	18 years 2 months 23 days	Tunisia
2	Hakim Meddane	1966–9–5	1984–3–8	18 years 3 months 25 days	Ghana
3	**Yacine Titraoui**	2003–7–23	2021–12–1	18 years 4 months 5 days	Sudan
4	Tarek Lazizi	1971–6–8	1990–1–12	18 years 7 months 4 days	Mali
5	Nacer Guedioura	1954–11–4	1973–5–20	18 years 9 months 9 days	Uganda
6	**Ismaël Bennacer**	1997–12–1	2016–9–4	18 years 9 months 27 days	Lesotho
7	Miloud Hadefi	1949–3–12	1968–3–17	19 years 0 months 5 days	Morocco

=== Most appearances at the Africa Cup of Nations ===
Italics denotes players still playing club football, Bold denotes players still playing in the national team.

players	Participations	Years	Best result
Rabah Madjer	6	1980, 1982, 1984, 1986, 1990, 1992	Winners
Mahieddine Meftah	6	1990, 1992, 1996, 1998, 2000, 2002	Winners
Djamel Menad	5	1984, 1986, 1988, 1990, 1992	Winners
Abdelhafid Tasfaout	5	1992, 1996, 1998, 2000, 2002	Quarter-finals x2
Lakhdar Belloumi	4	1980, 1982, 1984, 1988	Runners-up
Ali Fergani	4	1980, 1982, 1984, 1986	Runners-up
Mahmoud Guendouz	4	1980, 1982, 1984, 1986	Runners-up
Chaâbane Merzekane	4	1980, 1982, 1986, 1988	Runners-up
Hocine Yahi	4	1982, 1984, 1986, 1988	Third place x3
Fodil Megharia	4	1986, 1988, 1990, 1992	Winners
Billel Dziri	4	1996, 1998, 2000, 2002	Quarter-finals x2

=== Most appearances at the africa Cup of Nations and world Cup ===
Italics denotes players still playing club football, Bold denotes players still playing in the national team.

players	Participations	Africa Cup of Nations	FIFA world Cup
Rabah Madjer	8	1980, 1982, 1984, 1986, 1990, 1992	1982, 1986
Lakhdar Belloumi	6	1980, 1982, 1984, 1988	1982, 1986
Tedj Bensaoula	6	1980, 1982, 1984, 1986	1982, 1986
Mahmoud Guendouz	6	1980, 1982, 1984, 1986	1982, 1986
Mahieddine Meftah	6	1990, 1992, 1996, 1998, 2000, 2002	
Djamel Menad	6	1984, 1986, 1988, 1990, 1992	1982
Chaâbane Merzekane	6	1980, 1982, 1986, 1988	1982, 1986
Hocine Yahi	6	1980, 1982, 1984, 1986, 1988	1982
**Raïs M'Bolhi**	6	2013, 2015, 2017, 2019, 2021	2010, 2014
Ali Fergani	5	1980, 1982, 1984, 1986	1982
Faouzi Mansouri	5	1982, 1984, 1986	1982, 1986
Fodil Megharia	5	1986, 1988, 1990, 1992	1986
Chaâbane Merzekane	5	1980, 1982, 1986, 1988	1982
Djamel Mesbah	5	2013, 2015, 2017	2010, 2014
Abdelhafid Tasfaout	5	1992, 1996, 1998, 2000, 2002	

== Home record ==
As of 14 October 2025

Stadium	City	P	W	D	L	GF	GA	GD	Win %	First match	Last match
5 July stadium	Algiers	117	2	0	0	5	1	+4	100%	4 October 1972, v. Turkey	4 June 2022, v. Uganda
Mustapha Tchaker Stadium	Blida	55	42	12	1	138	27	+111	76.36%	20 August 2002, v. DR Congo	July 29, 2025 v. Mauritania
Municipal / 19 June / Ahmed Zabana Stadium	Oran	29	14	6	9	53	34	+19	48.28%	26 February 1963, v. Czechoslovakia	4 September 2005, v. Nigeria
El-Annasser / 20 August Stadium	Algiers	23								6 January 1963, v. Bulgaria	15 March 1972, v. Malta
19 May 1956 Stadium	Annaba	26	15	8	3	49	22	+27	57.69%	28 June 1987, v. Sudan	9 May 2025, v. Gambia
Chahid Hamlaoui Stadium	Constantine	9	7	1	1	21	5	+16	77.78%	4 December 1980, v. China	9 June 2025, v. Rwanda
Akid Lotfi Stadium	Tlemcen	6	4	2	0	15	4	+11	66,66 %	28 July 1989, v. Qatar	25 July 1993, v. Senegal
1st November Stadium	Batna	1	0	1	0	1	1	0	0%	13 March 1985, v. East Germany	—
African Unity Stadium	Mascara	1	1	0	0	2	1	+1	100%	11 December 1986, v. Ivory Coast	—
Aoued Meflah Stadium	Mascara	1	0	1	0	0	0	0	0%	29 October 1988, v. Angola	—
Maghrebi Unity Stadium	Béjaïa	1	0	1	0	1	1	0	0%	22 March 1989, v. Morocco	—
Miloud Hadefi Stadium	Oran	10	9	1	0	23	2	+21	90%	17 June 2021, v. Liberia	5 September 2024, v. Equatorial Guinea
Nelson Mandela Stadium	Baraki	11	6	4	1	16	10	+6	54.55%	7 January 2023, v. Ghana	8 August 2025, v. South Africa
Hocine Aït Ahmed Stadium	Boukhalfa	4	4	0	0	15	4	+11	100%	17 November 2024, v. Liberia	14 October 2025, v. Uganda
Total		216	139	47	30	416	164	+252	75,23 %	6 January 1963, v. Bulgaria	9 September 2018
