= List of leading goalscorers for the Algeria national football team =

This List of leading goalscorers for the Algeria national football team contains football players who have played for the Algeria national team and is listed, in descending order, according to their number of goals scored. The Algeria national football team (Arabic: منتخب الجزائر) represents the nation of Algeria in international football. It is fielded by the Algerian Football Federation (Arabic: الفيدرالية الجزائرية لكرة القدم) and competes as a member of Confederation of African Football.

== Players ==
- Goals and appearances are composed of FIFA World Cup and Africa Cup of Nations matches and each competition's required qualification matches, as well as numerous international friendly tournaments and matches. Players marked in **bold** are still active and eligible (meaning they have not retired) to play for the national team.

Statistics correct as of game against Austria on 2 July 2026.

Position key: GK – Goalkeeper; DF – Defender; MF – Midfielder; FW – Forward

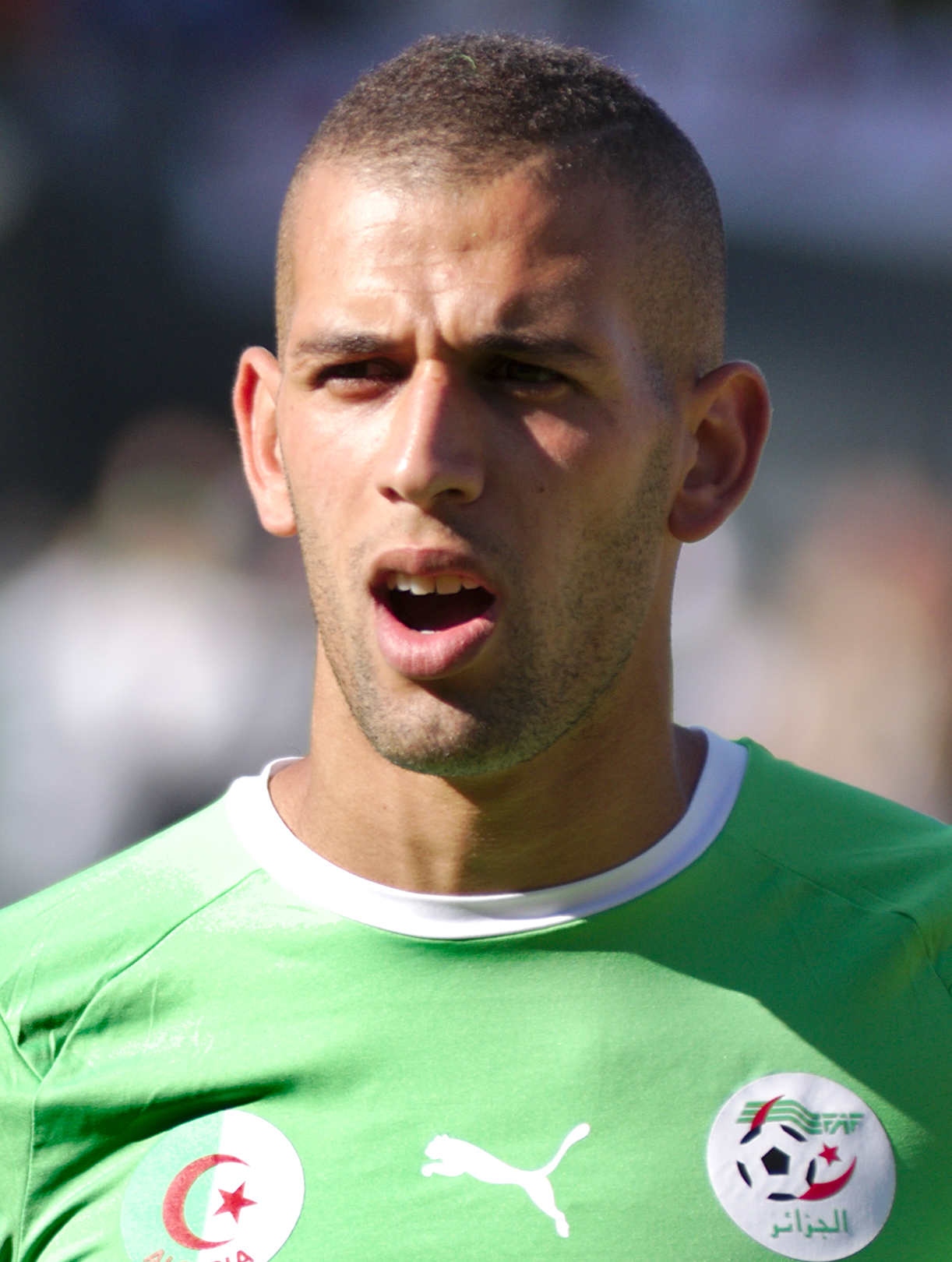
Islam Slimani is Algeria's top scorer with 46 goals.

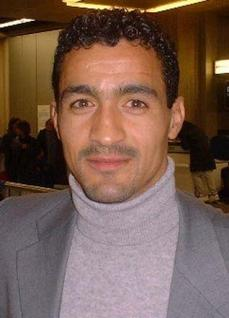
Abdelhafid Tasfaout was the all-time leading goalscorer of the national team, with 36 goals but was overtaken by Slimani with 46 goals.

Rank	Player	Position	National team career	Goals	Caps	Average	Other goals^{NC}
1	**Islam Slimani**	FW	2012–	46	105	0.44	0
2	Riyad Mahrez	MF	2014–2026	40	120	0.33	0
3	Abdelhafid Tasfaout	MF	1990–2002	36	80	0.45	1
4	**Baghdad Bounedjah**	FW	2014–	35	86	0.41	0
5	Lakhdar Belloumi	MF	1978–1989	28	100	0.28	6
5	Rabah Madjer	FW	1978–1992	28	86	0.33	5
7	Djamel Menad	FW	1980–1995	25	81	0.31	2
8	Hillal Soudani	FW	2011–	24	54	0.44	0
9	**Mohamed Amoura**	FW	2021–	19	47	0.4	0
9	Tedj Bensaoula	FW	1979–1986	19	51	0.37	5
9	**Sofiane Feghouli**	MF	2012–	20	82	0.24	1
12	Rafik Saifi	FW	1998–2010	18	64	0.28	0
13	Salah Assad	FW	1977–1989	15	73	0.21	1
13	**Yacine Brahimi**	MF	2013–	15	72	0.21	0
15	Hacène Lalmas	MF	1963–1974	14	43	0.33	11
16	**Amine Gouiri**	FW	2024–	11	27	0.41	0
17	Ali Meçabih	FW	1995–2003	10	24	0.42	2
17	**Youcef Belaïli**	MF	2015–	10	58	0.17	0
19	Rachid Dali	FW	1969–1975	9	17	0.53	2
19	Billel Dziri	MF	1992–2005	9	81	0.11	1
21	Omar Betrouni	FW	1968–1978	8	48	0.17	4
21	Hocine Yahi	MF	1982–1988	8	56	0.14	4
21	Mokhtar Kalem	FW	1965–1972	8	17	0.47	1
21	**Aïssa Mandi**	DF	2014–	8	123	0.07	0
25	Ali Fergani	MF	1973–1986	7	65	0.11	2
25	**Ramy Bensebaini**	DF	2017–	7	86	0.08	2
25	Abdelmalek Cherrad	FW	2000–2007	7	20	0.35	1

== See also ==
- List of Algeria international footballers
