= List of international goals scored by Islam Slimani =

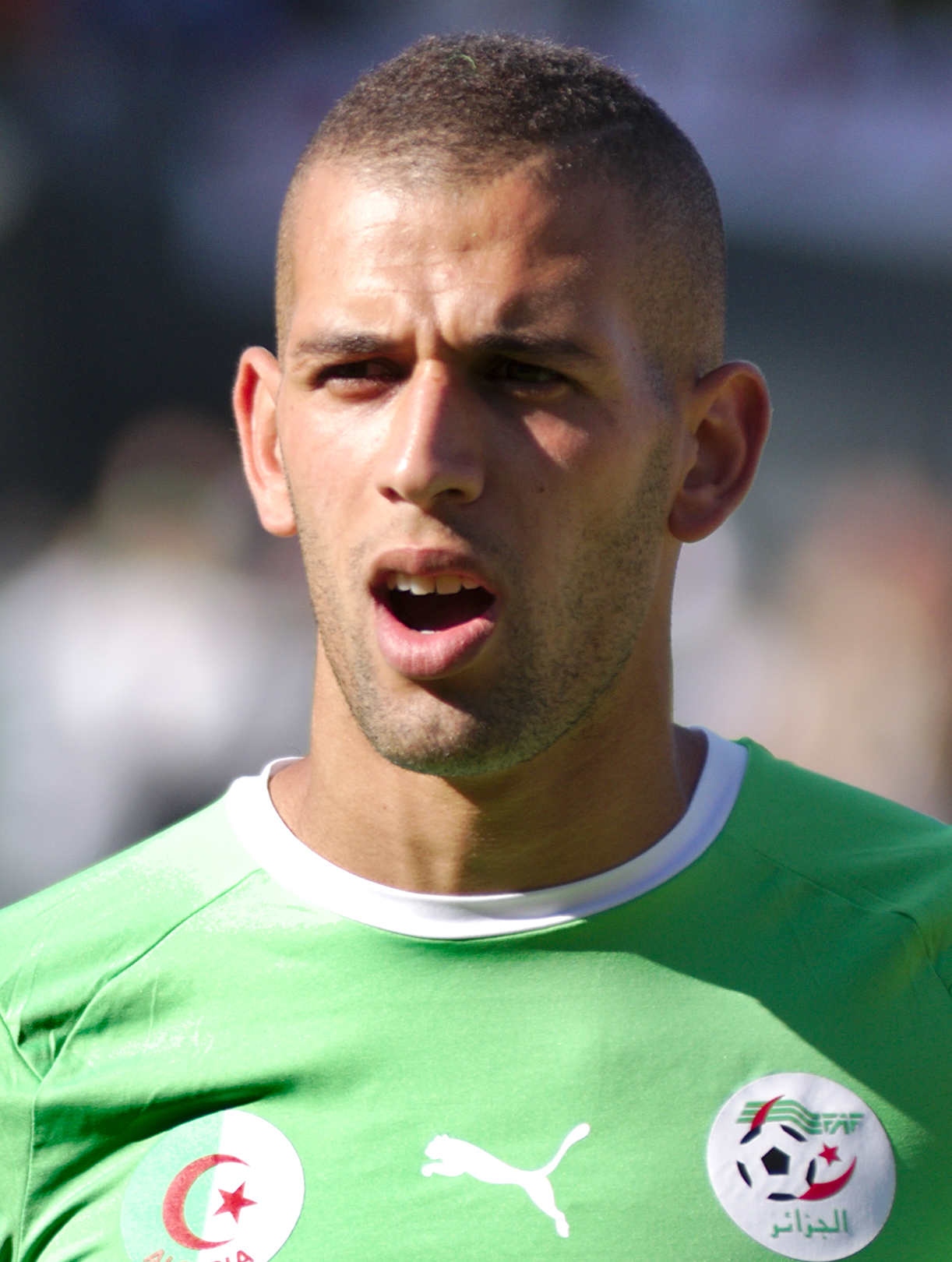
Islam Slimani is Algeria's top scorer with 46 goals.

Islam Slimani is the all-time top goalscorer for the Algeria national football team. As of 9 December 2025, he has scored 46 goals in 105 appearances since his debut on 2 June 2012.

On 8 October 2021, Slimani scored a brace in a 6–1 heavy victory over Niger in a 2022 FIFA World Cup qualifying match to become the Algeria's all-time top scorer with 39 goals, surpassing Abdelhafid Tasfaout who held the record with 36 goals for 19 years since 2002.

== International goals ==
Scores and results list Algeria's goal tally first.

No.	Date	Venue	Opponent	Score	Result	Competition	Ref.
1	2 June 2012	Mustapha Tchaker Stadium, Blida, Algeria	Rwanda	3–0	4–0	2014 FIFA World Cup qualification	
2	10 June 2012	Stade du 4 Août, Ouagadougou, Burkina Faso	Mali	1–0	1–2	2014 FIFA World Cup qualification	
3	15 June 2012	Mustapha Tchaker Stadium, Blida, Algeria	Gambia	2–0	4–1	2013 Africa Cup of Nations qualification	
4	15 June 2012	Mustapha Tchaker Stadium, Blida, Algeria	Gambia	3–1	4–1	2013 Africa Cup of Nations qualification	
5	14 October 2012	Mustapha Tchaker Stadium, Blida, Algeria	Libya	2–0	2–0	2013 Africa Cup of Nations qualification	
6	26 March 2013	Mustapha Tchaker Stadium, Blida, Algeria	Benin	3–1	3–1	2014 FIFA World Cup qualification	
7	2 June 2013	Mustapha Tchaker Stadium, Blida, Algeria	Burkina Faso	2–0	2–0	Friendly	
8	9 June 2013	Stade Charles de Gaulle, Porto-Novo, Benin	Benin	1–1	3–1	2014 FIFA World Cup qualification	
9	9 June 2013	Stade Charles de Gaulle, Porto-Novo, Benin	Benin	2–1	3–1	2014 FIFA World Cup qualification	
10	31 May 2014	Stade Tourbillon, Sion, Switzerland	Armenia	3–0	3–1	Friendly	
11	22 June 2014	Estádio Beira-Rio, Porto Alegre, Brazil	South Korea	1–0	4–2	2014 FIFA World Cup	
12	26 June 2014	Arena da Baixada, Curitiba, Brazil	Russia	1–1	1–1	2014 FIFA World Cup	
13	15 October 2014	Mustapha Tchaker Stadium, Blida, Algeria	Malawi	3–0	3–0	2015 Africa Cup of Nations qualification	
14	19 January 2015	Estadio de Mongomo, Mongomo, Equatorial Guinea	South Africa	3–1	3–1	2015 Africa Cup of Nations	
15	13 June 2015	Mustapha Tchaker Stadium, Blida, Algeria	Seychelles	1–0	4–0	2017 Africa Cup of Nations qualification	
16	9 October 2015	July 5, 1962 Stadium, Algiers, Algeria	Guinea	1–0	1–2	Friendly	
17	14 November 2015	National Stadium, Dar es Salaam, Tanzania	Tanzania	2–1	2–2	2018 FIFA World Cup qualification	
18	14 November 2015	National Stadium, Dar es Salaam, Tanzania	Tanzania	2–2	2–2	2018 FIFA World Cup qualification	
19	17 November 2015	Mustapha Tchaker Stadium, Blida, Algeria	Tanzania	4–0	7–0	2018 FIFA World Cup qualification	
20	17 November 2015	Mustapha Tchaker Stadium, Blida, Algeria	Tanzania	7–0	7–0	2018 FIFA World Cup qualification	
21	25 March 2016	Mustapha Tchaker Stadium, Blida, Algeria	Ethiopia	2–0	7–1	2017 Africa Cup of Nations qualification	
22	25 March 2016	Mustapha Tchaker Stadium, Blida, Algeria	Ethiopia	7–1	7–1	2017 Africa Cup of Nations qualification	
23	29 March 2016	Addis Ababa Stadium, Addis Ababa, Ethiopia	Ethiopia	1–1	3–3	2017 Africa Cup of Nations qualification	
24	23 January 2017	Stade de Franceville, Franceville, Gabon	Senegal	1–0	2–2	2017 Africa Cup of Nations	
25	23 January 2017	Stade de Franceville, Franceville, Gabon	Senegal	2–1	2–2	2017 Africa Cup of Nations	
26	14 November 2017	5 July 1962 Stadium, Algiers, Algeria	Central African Republic	3–0	3–0	Friendly	
27	1 July 2019	30 June Stadium, Cairo, Egypt	Tanzania	1–0	3–0	2019 Africa Cup of Nations	
28	9 September 2019	Mustapha Tchaker Stadium, Blida, Algeria	Benin	1–0	1–0	Friendly	
29	10 October 2019	Mustapha Tchaker Stadium, Blida, Algeria	DR Congo	1–0	1–1	Friendly	
30	25 March 2021	National Heroes Stadium, Lusaka, Zambia	Zambia	2–0	3–3	2021 Africa Cup of Nations qualification	
31	25 March 2021	National Heroes Stadium, Lusaka, Zambia	Zambia	3–2	3–3	2021 Africa Cup of Nations qualification	
32	2 September 2021	Mustapha Tchaker Stadium, Blida, Algeria	Djibouti	1–0	8–0	2022 FIFA World Cup qualification	
33	2 September 2021	Mustapha Tchaker Stadium, Blida, Algeria	Djibouti	2–0	8–0	2022 FIFA World Cup qualification	
34	2 September 2021	Mustapha Tchaker Stadium, Blida, Algeria	Djibouti	5–0	8–0	2022 FIFA World Cup qualification	
35	2 September 2021	Mustapha Tchaker Stadium, Blida, Algeria	Djibouti	6–0	8–0	2022 FIFA World Cup qualification	
36	8 October 2021	Mustapha Tchaker Stadium, Blida, Algeria	Niger	5–1	6–1	2022 FIFA World Cup qualification	
37	8 October 2021	Mustapha Tchaker Stadium, Blida, Algeria	Niger	6–1	6–1	2022 FIFA World Cup qualification	
38	12 November 2021	Cairo International Stadium, Cairo, Egypt	Djibouti	4–0	4–0	2022 FIFA World Cup qualification	
39	6 January 2022	Education City Stadium, Al Rayyan, Qatar	Ghana	3–0	3–0	Friendly	
40	25 March 2022	Japoma Stadium, Douala, Cameroon	Cameroon	1–0	1–0	2022 FIFA World Cup qualification	
41	23 September 2022	Olympic Stadium, Oran, Algeria	Guinea	1–0	1–0	Friendly	
42	12 October 2023	Mohamed Hamlaoui Stadium, Constantine, Algeria	Cape Verde	5–1	5–1	Friendly	
43	16 October 2023	Hazza bin Zayed Stadium, Al Ain, United Arab Emirates	Egypt	1–1	1–1	Friendly	
44	16 November 2023	Nelson Mandela Stadium, Algiers, Algeria	Somalia	3–1	3–1	2026 FIFA World Cup qualification	
45	9 January 2024	Stade de Kégué, Lomé, Togo	Burundi	3–0	4–0	Friendly	

Against non-first teams

On 5 January 2024, Algeria played in a friendly game against Togo A' (local team), in this game, Algeria changed more than 5 substitutes making this game not recognized by FIFA according to it laws.

No.	Date	Venue	Opponent	Score	Result	Competition
1	5 January 2024	Stade de Kégué, Lomé, Togo	Togo A'	2–0	3–0	Friendly

With Algeria A'

No.	Date	Venue	Opponent	Score	Result	Competition
1	25 May 2013	Mustapha Tchaker Stadium, Blida, Algeria	Mauritania	1–0	1–0	Friendly

== Statistics ==
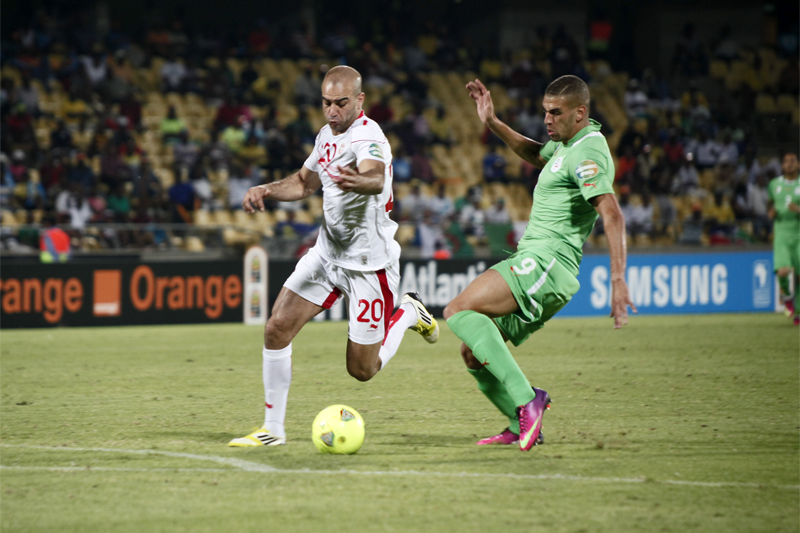
Slimani being tackled by Tunisian Aymen Abdennour at the 2013 Africa Cup of Nations

As of match played 9 December 2025

National team	Year	Apps	Goals
Algeria A'	2013	1	1
Algeria	2012	6	5
Algeria	2013	11	4
Algeria	2014	13	4
Algeria	2015	11	7
Algeria	2016	5	3
Algeria	2017	9	3
Algeria	2018	4	0
Algeria	2019	9	3
Algeria	2020	0	0
Algeria	2021	11	9
Algeria	2022	12	3
Algeria	2023	6	3
Algeria	2024	5	2
Algeria	2025	3	0
Algeria	Algeria total	105	46
Overall total		106	47

== See also ==
- List of top international men's football goal scorers by country
- List of leading goalscorers for the Algeria national football team
- Algeria national football team records and statistics
