= Algeria national football team results (2010–2019) =

This page is a list of all the matches that Algeria national football team has played between 2010 and 2019.

== 2010 ==
11-01-2010 2010 AFCON GS	Malawi	3–0	Algeria	Luanda
14:45	Mwafulirwa 17'; Kafoteka 35'; Banda 48'	Report		Stadium: Estádio 11 de Novembro; Attendance: 1,000; Referee: Badara Diatta (Senegal)

14-01-2010 2010 AFCON GS	Mali	0–1	Algeria	Luanda
17:00		Report	Halliche 43'	Stadium: Estádio 11 de Novembro; Attendance: 4,000; Referee: Muhmed Ssegonga (Uganda)

18-01-2010 2010 AFCON GS	Angola	0–0	Algeria	Luanda
17:00		Report		Stadium: Estádio 11 de Novembro; Attendance: 40,000; Referee: Jerome Damon (South Africa)

24-01-2010 2010 AFCON QF	Ivory Coast	2–3 (a.e.t.)	Algeria	Cabinda
20:30	Kalou 4'; Keïta 89'	Report	Matmour 39'; Bougherra 90+2'; Bouazza 92'	Stadium: Estádio Chimandela; Attendance: 10,000; Referee: Eddy Maillet (Seychelles)

28-01-2010 2010 AFCON SF	Algeria	0–4	Egypt	Benguela
20:30		Report	Abd Rabo 38' (pen.); Zidan 65'; Abdel-Shafy 80'; Gedo 90+2'	Stadium: Complexo da Sr. da Graça; Attendance: 30,000; Referee: Coffi Codjia (Benin)

30-01-2010 2010 AFCON TP	Nigeria	1–0	Algeria	Benguela
17:00	Obinna 56'	Report		Stadium: Complexo da Sr. da Graça; Attendance: 12,000; Referee: Badara Diatta (Senegal)

03-03-2010 Friendlies	Algeria	0–3	Serbia	Algiers
17:00		Report	Pantelić 16'; Kuzmanović 55'; Tošić 65'	Stadium: Stade 5 Juillet 1962; Attendance: 110,000; Referee: Badara Diata (Senegal)

28-05-2010 Friendlies	Republic of Ireland	3–0	Algeria	Dublin
18:45	Green 32'; Keane 52'; Keane 85'	Report	(yellow card) 66' Mansouri; (yellow card) 74' Mesbah	Stadium: RDS Arena; Attendance: 16,800; Referee: Eric Braamhar (Netherlands)

05-06-2010 Friendlies	Algeria	1–0	United Arab Emirates	Fürth
16:00	Ziani 51' (pen.); Ghezzal (yellow card) 27'; Matmour (yellow card) 68'	Report		Stadium: Playmobil Stadion; Attendance: 15,000; Referee: Gräre (Germany)

13-06-2010 2010 World Cup GS	Algeria	0–1	Slovenia	Polokwane
13:30		Report	Koren 79'	Stadium: Peter Mokaba Stadium; Attendance: 30,325; Referee: Carlos Batres (Guatemala)

18-06-2010 2010 World Cup GS	England	0–0	Algeria	Cape Town
20:30		Report		Stadium: Cape Town Stadium; Attendance: 64,100; Referee: Ravshan Irmatov (Uzbekistan)

23-06-2010 2010 World Cup GS	United States	1–0	Algeria	Pretoria
16:00	Donovan 90+1'	Report		Stadium: Loftus Versfeld Stadium; Attendance: 35,827; Referee: Frank De Bleeckere (Belgium)

11-08-2010 Friendlies	Algeria	1–2	Gabon	Algiers
20:30	84' Djebbour	Report	Cousin 34'; Aubameyang 56'	Stadium: Stade 5 Juillet 1962; Attendance: 15,000; Referee: Rouaissi Khalil

03-09-2010 2012 A.C.N Q	Algeria	1–1	Tanzania	Blida
22:00 UTC+1	Guedioura 45'	Report	Tegete 33'	Stadium: Stade Mustapha Tchaker; Attendance: 30,000; Referee: Kokou Djaoupe (Togo)

10-10-2010 2012 A.C.N Q	Central African Republic	2–0	Algeria	Bangui
15:00 UTC+1	Dopékoulouyen 81'; Momi 85'	Report		Stadium: Barthelemy Boganda Stadium; Attendance: 25,000; Referee: Martins De Carvalho (Angola)

17-11-2010 Friendlies	Luxembourg	0–0	Algeria	Luxembourg
20:15		Report		Stadium: Stade Josy Barthel; Attendance: 7,033; Referee: Sippel, Schiffner, Hofmann

== 2011 ==
27-03-2011 2012 A.C.N Q	Algeria	1–0	Morocco	Annaba
20:30 UTC+1	Yebda 5' (pen.)	Report		Stadium: Stade 19 Mai 1956; Attendance: 60,000; Referee: Seechurn Rajindraparsad (Mauritius)

04-06-2011 2012 A.C.N Q	Morocco	4–0	Algeria	Marrakesh
21:00 UTC+1	Benatia 25'; Chamakh 38'; Hadji 60'; Assaidi 68'	Report		Stadium: Marrakesh Stadium; Attendance: 40,000

03-09-2011 2012 A.C.N Q	Tanzania	1–1	Algeria	Dar es Salaam
16:00 UTC+3	Samata 22'	Report	Bouazza 52'	Stadium: Benjamin Mkapa; Referee: Ali Lenghaifry (Mauritania)

09-10-2011 2012 A.C.N Q	Algeria	2–0	Central African Republic	Algiers
20:30 UTC+1	Yebda 1' (yellow card) 23'; Kadir 28'	Report		Stadium: Stade 5 Juillet 1962; Attendance: 25,000; Referee: Ousmane Fall, Djibril Camara, Samba El Hadji Malik (Senegal)

12-11-2011 Friendlies	Algeria	1–0	Tunisia	Blida
18:00 UTC+1	Boudebouz 43'; Ghilas (yellow card) 44'	Report		Stadium: Stade Mustapha Tchaker; Attendance: 30,000; Referee: Achiri, El Medjrahi, Roubani (Moroccan)

== 2012 ==
29-02-2012 2013 A.C.N Q	Gambia	1–2	Algeria	Bakau
16:30 UTC±0	M. Ceesay 27'	Report	Yahia 56'; Feghouli 58'	Stadium: Independence Stadium; Referee: Koman Coulibaly (Mali)

26-05-2012 Friendlies	Algeria	3–0	Niger	Blida
20:30 UTC+1	Donkwa 35' (o.g.); Djebbour 38'; Soudani 83'	Report		Stadium: Stade Mustapha Tchaker; Attendance: 30.000; Referee: Serraïri, Melloulchi, Bensalem (Tunisia)

02-06-2012 2014 W.C Q	Algeria	4–0	Rwanda	Blida
20:30 UTC+1	Feghouli 26'; Soudani 31', 82'; Slimani 79'	Report		Stadium: Stade Mustapha Tchaker; Attendance: 30,000; Referee: Bakary Gassama (Gambia)

10-06-2012 2014 W.C Q	Mali	2–1	Algeria	Ouagadougou (Burkina Faso) (Note: Mali's opening home match in the World Cup qualifiers against Algeria was played at a neutral venue due to continued political instability in Mali.)
19:00 UTC±0	N'Diaye 30'; Maïga 81'	Report	Slimani 6'	Stadium: Stade du 4-Août; Attendance: 5,847; Referee: Daniel Bennett (South Africa)

15-06-2012 2013 A.C.N Q	Algeria	4–1	Gambia	Blida
20:30 UTC+1	Kadir 1'; Slimani 6', 52'; Soudani 65'	Report	Gassama 15'	Stadium: Stade Mustapha Tchaker; Attendance: 25.000; Referee: Slim Jedidi (Tunisia)

09-09-2012 2013 A.C.N Q	Libya	0–1	Algeria	Casablanca (Morocco)^{3}
18:00 UTC+1		Report	Soudani 88'	Stadium: Stade Mohamed V Referee: Badara Diatta (Senegal)

14-10-2012 2013 A.C.N Q	Algeria	2–0	Libya	Blida
20:30 UTC+1	Soudani 6'; Slimani 7'	Report		Stadium: Stade Mustapha Tchaker; Referee: Aboubacar Bangoura (Guinea)

14-11-2012 Friendlies	Algeria	0–1	Bosnia and Herzegovina	Algiers
18:00		Report	Svraka 90+2'	Stadium: Stade 5 Juillet 1962; Attendance: 30.000; Referee: Koman Coulibaly (Mali)

== 2013 ==
12-01-2013 Friendlies	South Africa	0–0	Algeria	Johannesburg
19:15		Report		Stadium: Ellis Park Stadium; Attendance: 14.558; Referee: Osiase Koto (Lesotho)

22-01-2013 2013 AFCON GS	Tunisia	1–0	Algeria	Rustenburg
20:00	Msakni 90+1'	Report		Stadium: Royal Bafokeng Stadium; Attendance: 10,000; Referee: Bakary Gassama (Gambia)

26-01-2013 2013 AFCON GS	Algeria	0–2	Togo	Rustenburg
20:00		Report	Adebayor 31'; Wome 90+5'	Stadium: Royal Bafokeng Stadium; Attendance: 35,000; Referee: Hamada Nampiandraza (Madagascar)

30-01-2013 2013 AFCON GS	Algeria	2–2	Ivory Coast	Rustenburg
19:00	Feghouli 64' (pen.); Soudani 70'	Report	Drogba 77'; Bony 81'	Stadium: Royal Bafokeng Stadium; Attendance: 5,000; Referee: Eric Otogo-Castane (Gabon)

26-03-2013 2014 W.C Q	Algeria	3–1	Benin	Blida
20:30 UTC+1	Feghouli 10'; Taïder 59'; Slimani 90+2'	Report	Gestede 26'	Stadium: Stade Mustapha Tchaker; Attendance: 32,000; Referee: Rajindraparsad Seechurn (Mauritius)

02-06-2013 Friendlies	Algeria	2–0	Burkina Faso	Blida
17:00	Soudani 35'; Slimani 56'	Report		Stadium: Stade Mustapha Tchaker; Attendance: 2.000; Referee: Nasrallah Jaouadi (Tunisia)

09-06-2013 2014 W.C Q	Benin	1–3	Algeria	Porto-Novo
16:00 UTC+1	Gestede 31'	Report	Slimani 38', 42'; Ghilas 78'	Stadium: Stade Charles de Gaulle; Attendance: 8,000; Referee: Néant Alioum (Cameroon)

16-06-2013 2014 W.C Q	Rwanda	0–1	Algeria	Kigali
15:30 UTC+2		Report	Taïder 51'	Stadium: Stade Amahoro; Attendance: 15,000; Referee: Yakhouba Keita (Guinea)

14-08-2013 Friendlies	Algeria	2–2	Guinea	Blida
20:30	Guedioura 11'; Djabou 24'	Report	56', 60' Cissé	Stadium: Stade Mustapha Tchaker; Attendance: 10.000; Referee: Ali Lemghirfi (Tunisia)

10-09-2013 2014 W.C Q	Algeria	1–0	Mali	Blida
20:30 UTC+1	Soudani 50'	Report		Stadium: Stade Mustapha Tchaker; Attendance: 23,500; Referee: Eric Otogo-Castane (Gabon)

12-10-2013 2014 W.C Q	Burkina Faso	3–2	Algeria	Ouagadougou
16:00 UTC±0	Pitroipa 45+2'; D. Koné 65'; Bancé 86' (pen.)	Report	Feghouli 50'; Medjani 68'	Stadium: Stade du 4-Août; Attendance: 31,000; Referee: Janny Sikazwe (Zambia)

19-11-2013 2014 W.C Q	Algeria	1–0	Burkina Faso	Blida
19:15 UTC+1	Bougherra 49'	Report		Stadium: Stade Mustapha Tchaker; Attendance: 35,000; Referee: Badara Diatta (Senegal)

== 2014 ==
05-03-2014 Friendly	Algeria	2–0	Slovenia	Blida
18:00	45+2' Soudani; 55' Taïder	Report		Stadium: Stade Mustapha Tchaker; Attendance: 15.000; Referee: Néant Alioum (Cameroon)

31-05-2014 Friendly	Algeria	3–1	Armenia	Sion
17:00	13' Belkalem; 21' Ghilas; 41' Slimani	Report	Sarkisov 46'	Stadium: Stade Tourbillon; Attendance: 14.000; Referee: Sascha Amhof

04-06-2014 Friendly	Algeria	2–1	Romania	Geneva
19:30	21' Bentaleb; 65' Soudani	Report	Chipciu 28'	Stadium: Stade de Genève; Attendance: 20.000; Referee: Nikolaj Hänni

17-06-2014 2014 World Cup GS	Belgium	2–1	Algeria	Belo Horizonte
13:00 UTC−3	Fellaini 70'; Mertens 80'	Report	Feghouli 24' (pen.)	Stadium: Estádio Mineirão; Attendance: 56,800; Referee: Marco Rodríguez (Mexico); Man of the Match: Kevin De Bruyne (Belgium)

22-06-2014 2014 World Cup GS	South Korea	2–4	Algeria	Porto Alegre
16:00 UTC−3	Son Heung-min 50'; Koo Ja-cheol 72'	Report	Slimani 26'; Halliche 28'; Djabou 38'; Brahimi 62'	Stadium: Estádio Beira-Rio; Attendance: 42,732; Referee: Wilmar Roldán (Colombia); Man of the Match: Islam Slimani (Algeria)

26-06-2014 2014 World Cup GS	Algeria	1–1	Russia	Curitiba
17:00 UTC−3	Slimani 60'	Report	Kokorin 6'	Stadium: Arena da Baixada; Attendance: 39,311; Referee: Cüneyt Çakır (Turkey); Man of the Match: Islam Slimani (Algeria)

30-06-2014 2014 World Cup 1/8	Germany	2–1 (a.e.t.)	Algeria	Porto Alegre
17:00 UTC−3	Schürrle 92'; Özil 119'	Report	Djabou 120+1'	Stadium: Estádio Beira-Rio; Attendance: 43,063; Referee: Sandro Ricci (Brazil); Man of the Match: Raïs M'Bolhi (Algeria)

06-09-2014 2015 A.C.N Q	Ethiopia	1–2	Algeria	Addis Ababa
16:00 UTC+3	Saladin 90+5' (pen.)	Report (CAF)	Soudani 35'; Brahimi 84'	Stadium: Addis Ababa Stadium; Referee: Bernard Camille (Seychelles)

10-09-2014 2015 A.C.N Q	Algeria	1–0	Mali	Blida
20:30 UTC+1	Medjani 83'	Report (CAF); Report		Stadium: Stade Mustapha Tchaker; Referee: Néant Alioum (Cameroon)

11-10-2014 2015 A.C.N Q	Malawi	0–2	Algeria	Blantyre
14:30 UTC+2		Report (CAF); Report	Halliche 10'; Mesbah 90+2'	Stadium: Kamuzu Stadium; Referee: Victor Gomes (South Africa)

15-10-2014 2015 A.C.N Q	Algeria	3–0	Malawi	Blida
20:30 UTC+1	Brahimi 2'; Mahrez 45'; Slimani 54'	Report (CAF); Report		Stadium: Stade Mustapha Tchaker; Referee: El Fadil Mohamed (Sudan)

15-11-2014 2015 A.C.N Q	Algeria	3–1	Ethiopia	Blida
20:30 UTC+1	Feghouli 32'; Mahrez 40'; Brahimi 45+2'	Report (CAF)	21' Oumed	Stadium: Stade Mustapha Tchaker; Attendance: 7.000; Referee: Ali Lemghaifry (Mauritania)

19-11-2014 2015 A.C.N Q	Mali	2–0	Algeria	Bamako
16:00 UTC±0	Keita 29' (pen.); M. Yatabaré 51'	Report (CAF)		Stadium: Stade du 26 Mars; Attendance: 20.000; Referee: Joseph Lamptey (Ghana)

== 2015 ==
11-01-2015 Friendlies	Tunisia	1–1	Algeria	Rades
18:00	Khazri 44'	Report	39' Cadamuro	Stadium: Stade Olympique de Radès; Attendance: 35.000; Referee: Hicham Ait Abbou (Morocco)

19-01-2015 2015 AFCON GS	Algeria	3–1	South Africa	Mongomo
20:00	Hlatshwayo 67' (o.g.); Ghoulam 72'; Slimani 83'	Report	Phala 51'	Stadium: Estadio de Mongomo; Attendance: 12,788; Referee: Noumandiez Doué (Ivory Coast)

23-01-2015 2015 AFCON GS	Ghana	1–0	Algeria	Mongomo
17:00	Gyan 90+2'	Report		Stadium: Estadio de Mongomo; Attendance: 12,387; Referee: Koman Coulibaly (Mali)

27-01-2015 2015 AFCON GS	Senegal	0–2	Algeria	Malabo
19:00		Report	Mahrez 11'; Bentaleb 82'	Stadium: Estadio de Malabo; Attendance: 14,549; Referee: Rajindraparsad Seechurn (Mauritius)

01-02-2015 2015 AFCON QF	Ivory Coast	3–1	Algeria	Malabo
20:30	Bony 26', 68'; Gervinho 90+4'	Report	Soudani 51'	Stadium: Estadio de Malabo; Attendance: 15,000; Referee: Bakary Gassama (Gambia)

26-03-2015 Friendly	Qatar	1–0	Algeria	Doha
19:00	Assadalla 32'	Report		Stadium: Abdullah bin Khalifa Stadium; Referee: Ravshan Irmatov (Uzbekistan)

26-03-2015 Friendly	Algeria	4–1	Oman	Doha
17:00	2', 62' Belfodil; 24', 61' Feghouli	Report 2	74' Al-Busaidi	Stadium: Suheim Bin Hamad Stadium; Referee: Vlado Glodjovic (Serbia)

13-06-2015 2017 AFCON Q	Algeria	4–0	Seychelles	Blida
20:30 UTC+1	Slimani 21'; Soudani 34', 47'; Bentaleb 89'	Report		Stadium: Stade Mustapha Tchaker; Referee: Mohamed Hamada (Mauritania)

06-09-2015 2017 AFCON Q	Lesotho	1–3	Algeria	Maseru
15:00 UTC+2	Mokhahlane 38'	Report	Ghoulam 32'; Soudani 85', 90+1'	Stadium: Setsoto Stadium; Referee: Jackson Pavaza (Namibia)

09-10-2015 Friendlies	Algeria	1–2	Guinea	Algiers
18:00	Slimani 2'	Report	15', 38' Bangoura	Stadium: July 5, 1962 Stadium; Attendance: 45.000; Referee: Fadhil Hussein (Sudan)

13-10-2015 Friendlies	Algeria	1–0	Senegal	Algiers
20:30	Brahimi 81'	Report		Stadium: July 5, 1962 Stadium; Attendance: 55.000; Referee: Namane Ibrahim (Niger)

14-11-2015 2018 World Cup Q	Tanzania	2–2	Algeria	Dar es Salaam
16:30 UTC+3	Maguri 43'; Samatta 55'	Report (FIFA); Report (CAF)	Slimani 72', 75'	Stadium: Benjamin Mkapa; Referee: Mahamadou Keita (Mali)

17-11-2015 2018 World Cup Q	Algeria	7–0	Tanzania	Blida
19:15 UTC+1	Brahimi 1'; Ghoulam 23', 59' (pen.); Mahrez 43'; Slimani 49' (pen.), 75'; Medjani 72'	Report (FIFA); Report (CAF)		Stadium: Stade Mustapha Tchaker; Referee: Sidi Alioum (Cameroon)

== 2016 ==
25-03-2016 2017 AFCON Q	Algeria	7–1	Ethiopia	Blida
20:30 UTC+1	Feghouli 23', 47'; Slimani 31', 90+2'; Brahimi 72'; Taïder 74'; Ghezzal 80'	Report	Kebede 84'	Stadium: Stade Mustapha Tchaker; Referee: Victor Gomes (South Africa)

29-03-2016 2017 AFCON Q	Ethiopia	3–3	Algeria	Addis Ababa
17:00 UTC+3	Kebede 28', 49'; Fekadu 64'	Report	Slimani 43'; Mandi 62'; Ghoulam 85' (pen.)	Stadium: Addis Ababa Stadium; Referee: Davies Omweno (Kenya)

02-06-2016 2017 AFCON Q	Seychelles	0–2	Algeria	Victoria
18:00 UTC+4		Report	Benzia 41'; Soudani 60'	Stadium: Stade Linité; Referee: El Fadil Mohamed (Sudan)

04-09-2016 2017 AFCON Q	Algeria	6–0	Lesotho	Blida
20:30 UTC+1	Soudani 7', 38'; Mahrez 18', 74'; Taïder 24'; Boudebouz 45+3' (pen.)	Report		Stadium: Stade Mustapha Tchaker; Referee: Sékou Ahmed Touré (Guinea)

09-10-2016 2018 World Cup Q	Algeria	1–1	Cameroon	Blida
20:30 GMT+1	Soudani 7'	Report (FIFA); Report (CAF)	24' Moukandjo	Stadium: Stade Mustapha Tchaker; Attendance: 35.000; Referee: Daniel Bennett (South Africa)

11-11-2016 2018 World Cup Q	Nigeria	3–1	Algeria	Uyo
17:00 GMT+1	Moses 25', 90+2'; Mikel 42'	Report (FIFA); Report (CAF)	67' Bentaleb	Stadium: Akwa Ibom Stadium; Attendance: 28.000; Referee: Bakary Gassama (Gambia)

== 2017 ==
07-01-2017 Friendlies	Algeria	3–1	Mauritania	Blida
17:00	Hanni 52'; Bounedjah 73'; Bentaleb 90+2'	Report	19' (pen.) Sidi El Hacen	Stadium: Mustapha Tchaker Stadium; Attendance: 4.500; Referee: Boubou Traore (Mali)

15-01-2017 2017 AFCON GS	Algeria	2–2	Zimbabwe	Franceville
17:00 UTC+1	Mahrez 12', 82'	Report	17' Mahachi; 29' (pen.) Mushekwi	Stadium: Stade de Franceville; Referee: Tessema Bamlak (Ethiopia)

19-01-2017 2017 AFCON GS	Algeria	1–2	Tunisia	Franceville
17:00 UTC+1	Hanni 90+2'	Report	50' (o.g.) Mandi; 66' (pen.) Sliti	Stadium: Stade de Franceville; Referee: Bernard Camille (Seychelles)

23-01-2017 2017 AFCON GS	Senegal	2–2	Algeria	Franceville
20:00 UTC+1	Diop 44'; Sow 53'	Report	10', 53' Slimani	Stadium: Stade de Franceville; Referee: Joshua Bondo (Botswana)

06-06-2017 Friendlies	Algeria	2–1	Guinea	Blida
22:00	Hanni 38'; Soudani 79'	Report	59' Camara	Stadium: Mustapha Tchaker Stadium; Attendance: 11,000; Referee: Slim Belkhaouas (Tunisia)

11-06-2017 2019 AFCON Q	Algeria	1–0	Togo	Blida
22:00 UTC+1	Hanni 24'	Report		Stadium: Mustapha Tchaker Stadium; Attendance: 18,000; Referee: Joshua Bondo (Botswana)

02-09-2017 2018 World Cup Q	Zambia	3–1	Algeria	Ndola
15:00 UTC+2	Mwila 6', 32'; Mwepu 88'	Report (FIFA); Report (CAF)	53' Brahimi	Stadium: National Heroes Stadium; Referee: Hélder Martins de Carvalho (Angola)

05-09-2017 2018 World Cup Q	Algeria	0–1	Zambia	Constantine
20:30 UTC+1		Report (FIFA); Report (CAF)	66' Daka	Stadium: Mohamed Hamlaoui Stadium; Attendance: 40,000; Referee: Mahamadou Keita (Mali)

07-10-2017 2018 World Cup Q	Cameroon	2–0	Algeria	Yaoundé
17:00 UTC+1	N'Jie 25'; Pangop 88'	Report (FIFA); Report (CAF)		Stadium: Stade Ahmadou Ahidjo; Attendance: 35,000; Referee: Youssef Essrayri (Tunisia)

10-11-2017 2018 World Cup Q	Algeria	1–1	Nigeria	Constantine
20:30 UTC+1	Brahimi 88' (pen.)	Report (FIFA); Report (CAF)	63' Ogu	Stadium: Mohamed Hamlaoui Stadium; Attendance: 30,000; Referee: Eric Otogo-Castane (Gabon)

14-11-2017 Friendlies	Algeria	3–0	Central African Republic	Algiers
20:30	Brahimi 39', 71'; Slimani 85'	Report		Stadium: July 5, 1962 Stadium; Attendance: 10,000; Referee: Haythem Guirat (Tunisia)

== 2018 ==
22-03-2018 Friendlies	Algeria	4–1	Tanzania	Algiers
18:00 UTC+1	Bounedjah 12', 80'; Kapombe 44' (o.g.); Medjani 53'	Report	21' Kichuya	Stadium: July 5, 1962 Stadium; Attendance: 8,000; Referee: Ahmed Al Ghandour (Egypt)

27-03-2018 Friendlies	Iran	2–1	Algeria	Graz
18:00 UTC+2	Azmoun 11'; Taremi 19'	Report	56' Chafaï	Stadium: Liebenauer Stadium; Attendance: 3,000; Referee: Julian Weinberger (Austria)

09-05-2018 Friendlies	Saudi Arabia	2–0	Algeria	Cádiz
19:30 UTC+1	Al Faraj 24'; Al Shehri 81'	Report		Stadium: Estadio Ramón de Carranza; Attendance: 175; Referee: Juan Martínez Munuera (Spain)

01-06-2018 Friendlies	Algeria	2–3	Cape Verde	Algiers
22:15 UTC+1	Bensebaini 5'; Bounedjah 30'	Report	14' Gomes; 67' Mendes; 72' Tavares	Stadium: July 5, 1962 Stadium; Attendance: 8,000; Referee: Mohamed Maarouf Eid Mansour (Egypt)

07-06-2018 Friendlies	Portugal	3–0	Algeria	Lisbon
20:15 UTC+1	Guedes 17', 55'; B. Fernandes 37'	Report		Stadium: Estádio da Luz; Attendance: 53,014; Referee: Craig Pawson (England)

08-09-2018 2019 AFCON Q	Gambia	1–1	Algeria	Bakau
16:30 UTC+0	Ceesay 49'	Report	Bounedjah 47'	Stadium: Independence Stadium; Attendance: 40,000; Referee: Youssef Essrayri (Tunisia)

12-10-2018 2019 AFCON Q	Algeria	2–0	Benin	Blida
20:45 UTC+1	Bensebaini 20'; Bounedjah 73'	Report		Stadium: Stade Mustapha Tchaker; Referee: Sékou Ahmed Touré (Guinea)

16-10-2018 2019 AFCON Q	Benin	1–0	Algeria	Cotonou
16:00 UTC+1	D'Almeida 16'	Report		Stadium: Stade de l'Amitié; Referee: Jackson Pavaza (Namibia)

18-11-2018 2019 AFCON Q	Togo	1–4	Algeria	Lomé
16:00 UTC+0	Fo-Doh Laba 55'	Report	Mahrez 13', 30'; Attal 28'; Bounedjah 90+2'	Stadium: Stade Municipal; Referee: Davies Omweno (Kenya)

27-12-2018 Friendlies	Qatar	0–1	Algeria	Doha
15:00 UTC+3		Report		Stadium: Khalifa International Stadium

== 2019 ==
This year, Algeria's participation in the Africa Cup of Nations The first match was the final round of Africa Cup of Nations qualification against the Gambia and ended with a 1-1 draw, scoring the only goal for Algeria's Mehdi Abeid. to end the qualifiers in the lead with 11 points. The preparation for CAN 2019 begins with three friendlies: The first at the end of March, which ended with a victory for Les Fennecs (1-0) against Tunisia with a goal from Baghdad Bounedjah on penalty, the other two matches will be determined by the FAF after having drawn the draw for the 2019 Africa Cup of Nations. After he was scheduled to attend the national team in preparation for the Africa Cup of Nations in the UAE, the coach retreated and chose Qatar due to the preparation of both Burundi and Mali rivals Algeria before Africa Cup. first match against Burundi ended with a 1-1 draw and Bounedjah scored the goal of Algeria after a pass from Youcef Belaïli. Coach Djamel Belmadi has decided to dismiss Haris Belkebla after a video broadcast live and accessible long hours after a live stream of Fortnite on tweet account of Alexandre Oukidja and he was replaced by Andy Delort. On June 16, In the last match before heading to Egypt against Mali, Algeria won 3–2 and the new striker Delort scoring the winning goal.

With the start of the African Cup, the Algerian national team managed to achieve the full haul of nine points in Group C For the first time since 1990 in Algeria without receiving any goal, the first three points were against Kenya by 2–0 Bounedjah converted from the penalty spot after 34 minutes in Cairo following a clear foul on Youcef Atal. then Riyad Mahrez doubled the advantage with a deflected shot from Ismael Bennacer's cut-back two minutes before half-time, With this goal Mahrez became the first Algerian to score in three consecutive copies 2015, 2017 and 2019. In the second game Algeria face Senegal in a battle for top spot Youcef Belaili blasted home the only goal of the game from the edge of box from Sofiane Feghouli's cross, to clinch a place in the Africa Cup of Nations last 16, Bennacer also won Man of the Match for the second time in a row. In their last game against Tanzania, Belmadi changed the whole squad except M'Bolhi and Bennacer, and despite that they won with three goals. The first goal was scored by Islam Slimani after an assist from Adam Ounas, after which Slimani gave two decisive passes to Ounas the last with the end of the match won Man of the Match.

Algeria continued its rampant performance with a 3–0 win over Guinea in the round of 16, Belaili took the lead after a neat one-two with Bounedjah In the second half, Mahrez added the second goal with a moment of quality, before substitute Ounas tapped in Youcef Atal's low cross from close range. but struggled harder against Ivory Coast, being held 1–1 after 120' before overcame the Ivorians 4–3 in penalty shootout After Serey Dié miss the last kick of Ivory Coast, this game saw the injury of Atal and miss the rest of the games. The Algerians then put up an outstanding performance, beating African powerhouse Nigeria 2–1, with a late minute goal by Mahrez in a free kick spot to reach their first ever final since winning at home at 1990.

22-03-2019 2019 AFCON Q	Algeria	1–1	Gambia	Blida
20:45 UTC+1	Abeid 42'	Report	Danso 90+2'	Stadium: Mustapha Tchaker Stadium; Attendance: 1,030; Referee: Sidi Alioum (Cameroon)

26-03-2019 Friendly	Algeria	1–0	Tunisia	Blida
20:45 UTC+1	Bounedjah 70' (pen.)	Report		Stadium: Mustapha Tchaker Stadium; Attendance: 15,000; Referee: Samir Guezzaz (Morocco)

11-06-2019 Friendly	Algeria	1–1	Burundi	Doha
19:00 UTC+3	Bounedjah 66'	Report	M'Bolhi 75' (o.g.)	Stadium: Jassim bin Hamad Stadium; Referee: Ali Shaban (Kuwait)

16-06-2019 Friendly	Algeria	3–2	Mali	Doha
21:00 UTC+3	Bounedjah 41'; Belaïli 76' (pen.); Delort 81'	Report	Diaby 20' (pen.); Sacko 68'	Stadium: Khalifa International Stadium

23-06-2019 2019 AFCON GS	Algeria	2–0	Kenya	Cairo
22:00 UTC+2	Bounedjah 34' (pen.); Mahrez 43'	Report		Stadium: 30 June Stadium; Attendance: 8,071; Referee: Mahamadou Keita (Mali)

27-06-2019 2019 AFCON GS	Senegal	0–1	Algeria	Cairo
19:00 UTC+2		Report	Belaïli 49'	Stadium: 30 June Stadium; Attendance: 25,765; Referee: Janny Sikazwe (Zambia)

01-07-2019 2019 AFCON GS	Tanzania	0–3	Algeria	Cairo
21:00 UTC+2		Report	Slimani 35'; Ounas 39', 45+1'	Stadium: Al Salam Stadium; Attendance: 8,921; Referee: Andofetra Rakotojaona (Madagascar)

07-07-2019 2019 AFCON R16	Algeria	3–0	Guinea	Cairo
21:00 UTC+2	Belaïli 24'; Mahrez 57'; Ounas 82'	Report		Stadium: 30 June Stadium; Attendance: 8,205; Referee: Bernard Camille (Seychelles)

11-07-2019 2019 AFCON QF	Ivory Coast	1–1 (a.e.t.) (3–4 p)	Algeria	Suez
18:00 UTC+2	Kodjia 62'	Report	Feghouli 20'	Stadium: Suez Stadium; Attendance: 8,233; Referee: Bamlak Tessema Weyesa (Ethiopia)
	Penalties
	Kessié (penalty scored); Cornet (penalty scored); Bony (penalty missed); Gradel (penalty scored); Dié (penalty missed)		(penalty scored) Bensebaini; (penalty scored) Slimani; (penalty scored) Delort; (penalty scored) Ounas; (penalty missed) Belaïli

14-07-2019 2019 AFCON SF	Algeria	2–1	Nigeria	Cairo
21:00 UTC+2	Troost-Ekong 40' (o.g.); Mahrez 90+5'	Report	Ighalo 72' (pen.)	Stadium: Cairo International Stadium; Attendance: 49,775; Referee: Bakary Gassama (Gambia)

19-07-2019 2019 AFCON Final	Senegal	0–1	Algeria	Cairo
21:00 UTC+2		Report	Bounedjah 2'	Stadium: Cairo International Stadium; Attendance: 75,000; Referee: Sidi Alioum (Cameroon)

09-09-2019 Friendly	Algeria	1–0	Benin	Blida
21:00 UTC+1	Slimani 72' (pen.)	Report		Stadium: Mustapha Tchaker Stadium; Attendance: 45,000; Referee: Ibrahim Nour El Din (Egypt)

10-10-2019 Friendly	Algeria	1–1	DR Congo	Blida
20:45 UTC+1	Slimani 6'	Report	Bakambu 26'	Stadium: Mustapha Tchaker Stadium; Referee: Ahmadou Alou Moussa (Niger)

15-10-2019 Friendly	Algeria	3–0	Colombia	Villeneuve-d'Ascq
20:00 UTC+2	Bounedjah 15'; Mahrez 20', 65'	Report		Stadium: Stade Pierre-Mauroy; Referee: Ruddy Buquet (France)

14-11-2019 2021 AFCON Q	Algeria	5–0	Zambia	Blida
20:00 UTC+1	Bensebaini 44'; Bounedjah 68' (pen.), 90'; Belaïli 75'; Soudani 86'			Stadium: Mustapha Tchaker Stadium; Referee: Bamlak Tessema Weyesa (Ethiopia)

18-11-2019 2021 AFCON Q	Botswana	0–1	Algeria	Gaborone
21:00 UTC+2			Belaïli 15'	Stadium: National Stadium; Referee: Ali Sabilla (Uganda)

Key: GS, Group stage; R16, round of 16; QF, quarter-finals; SF, semi-finals; 3rd, third-place match; FWC, FIFA World Cup; FWC Q, FIFA World Cup
