= Baraki =

Baraki may refer to:

- Baraki Barak, Garissa County, Kenya
- Baraki, Afghanistan
- Baraki District, Algiers Province, Algeria
  - Baraki, Algiers
- Baraki, Iran

== Poland ==
- Baraki, Krasnystaw County, in Lublin Voivodeship (east Poland)
- Baraki, Kraśnik County, in Lublin Voivodeship (east Poland)
- Baraki, Podlaskie Voivodeship (north-east Poland)
- Baraki, Lublin County, in Lublin Voivodeship (east Poland)
- Baraki, Subcarpathian Voivodeship (south-east Poland)
- Baraki, Masovian Voivodeship (east-central Poland)

== Other uses ==
- Yosef Baraki (born 1989), Canadian filmmaker, writer, and producer

== See also ==
- Barak (disambiguation)
