= 2014 FIFA World Cup Group H =

Football tournament group stage

Group H of the 2014 FIFA World Cup consisted of Belgium, Algeria, Russia and South Korea. Play began on 17 June and ended on 26 June 2014. The top two teams, Belgium and Algeria, advanced to the round of 16.

== Teams ==
Draw position	Team	Confederation	Method of qualification	Date of qualification	Finals appearance	Last appearance	Previous best performance	FIFA Rankings	
Draw position	Team	Confederation	Method of qualification	Date of qualification	Finals appearance	Last appearance	Previous best performance	October 2013 (Note: The rankings of October 2013 were used for seeding for the final draw.)	June 2014
H1 (seed)	Belgium	UEFA	UEFA Group A winners	11 October 2013	12th	2002	Fourth place (1986)	5	11
H2	Algeria	CAF	CAF third round winners	19 November 2013	4th	2010	Group stage (1982, 1986, 2010)	32	22
H3	Russia	UEFA	UEFA Group F winners	15 October 2013	10th (Note: This is Russia's third appearance as an independent nation at the FIFA World Cup; however, FIFA considers Russia as the successor to the Soviet Union, who qualified for the World Cup seven times.)	2002	Fourth place (1966) (Note: Russia's best result is group stage in 1994 and 2002. However, FIFA considers Russia as the successor team of the Soviet Union.)	19	19
H4	South Korea	AFC	AFC fourth round Group A runners-up	18 June 2013	9th	2010	Fourth place (2002)	56	57

== Standings ==
Pos	Team	Pld	W	D	L	GF	GA	GD	Pts	Qualification
1	Belgium	3	3	0	0	4	1	+3	9	Advance to knockout stage
2	Algeria	3	1	1	1	6	5	+1	4	Advance to knockout stage
3	Russia	3	0	2	1	2	3	−1	2	
4	South Korea	3	0	1	2	3	6	−3	1	

Source: FIFA
Rules for classification: Tie-breaking criteria
- Belgium advanced to play the United States (the runners-up of Group G) in the round of 16.
- Algeria advanced to play Germany (the winners of Group G) in the round of 16.

== Matches ==
=== Belgium vs Algeria ===
The two teams had met in two previous matches, both friendlies, most recently in 2003, won 3–1 by Belgium.

Algeria took a one-goal lead in the first half after Sofiane Feghouli converted a penalty kick, awarded for a foul on him by Jan Vertonghen. Belgium came back with two goals in the second half, both scored by substitutes. The equaliser was scored by Marouane Fellaini, heading in a cross from the left by Kevin De Bruyne, followed by the game winner scored by Dries Mertens from a pass by Eden Hazard.

Feghouli's goal snapped Algeria's 506-minute World Cup scoreless streak stretching back to 1986, second place at the time to the record of 517 minutes between 1930 and 1990 held by Bolivia.

17 June 2014
13:00 BRT (UTC−3)

Belgium	2–1	Algeria
Fellaini 70'; Mertens 80'		Feghouli 25' (pen.)

Estádio Mineirão, Belo Horizonte
Attendance: 56,800
Referee: Marco Rodríguez (Mexico)

Belgium	Algeria

GK	1	Thibaut Courtois
RB	2	Toby Alderweireld
CB	15	Daniel Van Buyten
CB	4	Vincent Kompany (c)
LB	5	Jan Vertonghen	(yellow card) 24'
CM	6	Axel Witsel
CM	19	Moussa Dembélé		(substituted off) 65'
RW	22	Nacer Chadli		(substituted off) 46'
AM	7	Kevin De Bruyne
LW	10	Eden Hazard
CF	9	Romelu Lukaku		(substituted off) 58'
Substitutions:
FW	14	Dries Mertens		(substituted on) 46'
FW	17	Divock Origi		(substituted on) 58'
MF	8	Marouane Fellaini		(substituted on) 65'
Manager:
Marc Wilmots

GK	23	Raïs M'Bolhi
RB	22	Mehdi Mostefa
CB	2	Madjid Bougherra (c)
CB	5	Rafik Halliche
LB	3	Faouzi Ghoulam
RM	19	Saphir Taïder
CM	12	Carl Medjani		(substituted off) 84'
LM	14	Nabil Bentaleb	(yellow card) 34'
AM	10	Sofiane Feghouli
AM	21	Riyad Mahrez		(substituted off) 71'
CF	15	Hillal Soudani		(substituted off) 66'
Substitutions:
FW	13	Islam Slimani		(substituted on) 66'
MF	8	Mehdi Lacen		(substituted on) 71'
FW	9	Nabil Ghilas		(substituted on) 84'
Manager:
(Bosnia and Herzegovina) Vahid Halilhodžić

Man of the Match:
Kevin De Bruyne (Belgium)

Assistant referees:
Marvin Torrentera (Mexico)
Marcos Quintero (Mexico)
Fourth official:
Alireza Faghani (Iran)
Fifth official:
Hassan Kamranifar (Iran)

=== Russia vs South Korea ===
The two teams had met in one previous match, in a friendly in 2013.

After a goalless first half, the two teams traded goals by substitutes in the second half as the match finished 1–1. First, Han Kook-young passed to Lee Keun-ho, and his long range shot was spilled by Russian goalkeeper Igor Akinfeev into the net. Russia equalised after Alan Dzagoev's shot was parried by South Korean goalkeeper Jung Sung-ryong, the clearance hit Andrey Yeshchenko, and Aleksandr Kerzhakov scored from close range.

17 June 2014
18:00 AMT (UTC−4)

Russia	1–1	South Korea
Kerzhakov 74'		Lee Keun-ho 68'

Arena Pantanal, Cuiabá
Attendance: 37,603
Referee: Néstor Pitana (Argentina)

Russia	South Korea

GK	1	Igor Akinfeev
RB	22	Andrey Yeshchenko
CB	4	Sergei Ignashevich
CB	14	Vasili Berezutski (c)
LB	23	Dmitri Kombarov
DM	8	Denis Glushakov		(substituted off) 72'
CM	20	Viktor Fayzulin
CM	18	Yuri Zhirkov		(substituted off) 71'
RW	19	Aleksandr Samedov
LW	17	Oleg Shatov	(yellow card) 49'	(substituted off) 59'
CF	9	Aleksandr Kokorin
Substitutions:
MF	10	Alan Dzagoev		(substituted on) 59'
FW	11	Aleksandr Kerzhakov		(substituted on) 71'
MF	7	Igor Denisov		(substituted on) 72'
Manager:
(Italy) Fabio Capello

GK	1	Jung Sung-ryong
RB	12	Lee Yong
CB	5	Kim Young-gwon
CB	20	Hong Jeong-ho		(substituted off) 73'
LB	3	Yun Suk-young
CM	16	Ki Sung-yueng	(yellow card) 30'
CM	14	Han Kook-young
RW	17	Lee Chung-yong
AM	13	Koo Ja-cheol (c)	(yellow card) 90'
LW	9	Son Heung-min	(yellow card) 13'	(substituted off) 84'
CF	10	Park Chu-young		(substituted off) 56'
Substitutions:
FW	11	Lee Keun-ho		(substituted on) 56'
DF	6	Hwang Seok-ho		(substituted on) 73'
MF	7	Kim Bo-kyung		(substituted on) 84'
Manager:
Hong Myung-bo

Man of the Match:
Son Heung-min (South Korea)

Assistant referees:
Hernán Maidana (Argentina)
Juan Pablo Belatti (Argentina)
Fourth official:
Roberto Moreno (Panama)
Fifth official:
Eric Boria (United States)

=== Belgium vs Russia ===
The two teams had met in eight previous matches (including matches involving the Soviet Union), including four in the FIFA World Cup (1970, group stage: Belgium 1–4 Soviet Union; 1982, second group stage: Belgium 0–1 Soviet Union; 1986, round of 16: Belgium 4–3 (aet) Soviet Union; 2002, group stage: Belgium 3–2 Russia).

Aleksandr Kokorin had Russia's best chance in the first half, heading wide from six yards. Late in the second half, Belgian substitute Kevin Mirallas hit the post with his free kick, but Belgium did find the game-winner through another substitute, Divock Origi scoring from 8 yards out after Eden Hazard's cut-back from the left. This victory sent Belgium into the knockout stage.

22 June 2014
13:00 BRT (UTC−3)

Belgium	1–0	Russia
Origi 88'

Estádio do Maracanã, Rio de Janeiro
Attendance: 73,819
Referee: Felix Brych (Germany)

Belgium	Russia

GK	1	Thibaut Courtois
RB	2	Toby Alderweireld	(yellow card) 73'
CB	15	Daniel Van Buyten
CB	4	Vincent Kompany (c)
LB	3	Thomas Vermaelen		(substituted off) 31'
CM	6	Axel Witsel	(yellow card) 54'
CM	8	Marouane Fellaini
RW	14	Dries Mertens		(substituted off) 75'
AM	7	Kevin De Bruyne
LW	10	Eden Hazard
CF	9	Romelu Lukaku		(substituted off) 57'
Substitutions:
DF	5	Jan Vertonghen		(substituted on) 31'
FW	17	Divock Origi		(substituted on) 57'
MF	11	Kevin Mirallas		(substituted on) 75'
Manager:
Marc Wilmots

GK	1	Igor Akinfeev
RB	2	Aleksei Kozlov		(substituted off) 62'
CB	14	Vasili Berezutski (c)
CB	4	Sergei Ignashevich
LB	23	Dmitri Kombarov
DM	8	Denis Glushakov	(yellow card) 38'
CM	20	Viktor Fayzulin
RW	19	Aleksandr Samedov		(substituted off) 90'
AM	6	Maksim Kanunnikov
LW	17	Oleg Shatov		(substituted off) 83'
CF	9	Aleksandr Kokorin
Substitutions:
DF	22	Andrey Yeshchenko		(substituted on) 62'
MF	10	Alan Dzagoev		(substituted on) 83'
FW	11	Aleksandr Kerzhakov		(substituted on) 90'
Manager:
(Italy) Fabio Capello

Man of the Match:
Eden Hazard (Belgium)

Assistant referees:
Mark Borsch (Germany)
Stefan Lupp (Germany)
Fourth official:
Carlos Vera (Ecuador)
Fifth official:
Byron Romero (Ecuador)

=== South Korea vs Algeria ===
The two teams had met in two previous matches, both in friendlies both in 1985.

Algeria, who needed at least a point to stay alive in the competition, scored three goals in the first half to take a comfortable lead. First, Islam Slimani sped past two South Korean defenders to receive Carl Medjani's long pass and slot home with his left foot past the advancing goalkeeper. Two minutes later, Rafik Halliche headed in Abdelmoumene Djabou's corner from the left. Djabou scored himself later after he received a pass from Slimani, shooting low with his left foot from twelve yards out. Early in the second half, Son Heung-min controlled a long pass from Ki Sung-yueng to shoot with his left foot between the goalkeeper's legs and reduce the deficit, but Yacine Brahimi restored Algeria's three-goal lead after a one-two with Sofiane Feghouli to side foot home from inside the penalty area with his right foot. Koo Ja-cheol scored South Korea's second goal after a pass from Lee Keun-ho from the left, but Algeria held on for its third ever World Cup victory, but its first since 24 June 1982.

Algeria became the first African team to score four goals in a World Cup match, a record that stood for 12 years until Senegal surpassed it with a 5–0 victory over Iraq in 2026.

22 June 2014
16:00 BRT (UTC−3)

South Korea	2–4	Algeria
Son Heung-min 50'; Koo Ja-cheol 72'		Slimani 26'; Halliche 28'; Djabou 38'; Brahimi 62'

Estádio Beira-Rio, Porto Alegre
Attendance: 42,732
Referee: Wilmar Roldán (Colombia)

South Korea	Algeria

GK	1	Jung Sung-ryong
RB	12	Lee Yong	(yellow card) 54'
CB	20	Hong Jeong-ho
CB	5	Kim Young-gwon
LB	3	Yun Suk-young
CM	14	Han Kook-young	(yellow card) 69'	(substituted off) 78'
CM	16	Ki Sung-yueng
RW	17	Lee Chung-yong		(substituted off) 64'
AM	13	Koo Ja-cheol (c)
LW	9	Son Heung-min
CF	10	Park Chu-young		(substituted off) 57'
Substitutions:
FW	18	Kim Shin-wook		(substituted on) 57'
FW	11	Lee Keun-ho		(substituted on) 64'
FW	19	Ji Dong-won		(substituted on) 78'
Manager:
Hong Myung-bo

GK	23	Raïs M'Bolhi
CB	12	Carl Medjani
CB	2	Madjid Bougherra (c)	(yellow card) 67'	(substituted off) 89'
CB	5	Rafik Halliche
RWB	20	Aïssa Mandi
LWB	6	Djamel Mesbah
CM	11	Yacine Brahimi		(substituted off) 77'
CM	18	Abdelmoumene Djabou		(substituted off) 73'
RW	10	Sofiane Feghouli
LW	14	Nabil Bentaleb
CF	13	Islam Slimani
Substitutions:
FW	9	Nabil Ghilas		(substituted on) 73'
MF	8	Mehdi Lacen		(substituted on) 77'
DF	4	Essaïd Belkalem		(substituted on) 89'
Manager:
(Bosnia and Herzegovina) Vahid Halilhodžić

Man of the Match:
Islam Slimani (Algeria)

Assistant referees:
Eduardo Díaz (Colombia)
Christian Lescano (Ecuador)
Fourth official:
Alireza Faghani (Iran)
Fifth official:
Hassan Kamranifar (Iran)

=== South Korea vs Belgium ===
The two teams had met in three previous matches, including twice in the FIFA World Cup group stage (1990: South Korea 0–2 Belgium; 1998: South Korea 1–1 Belgium).

Belgium, who had already qualified for the knockout stage and would win the group unless both South Korea won this match and Algeria beat Russia in the other simultaneous match (which would allow Algeria to win the group on goal difference), had Steven Defour sent off for a reckless tackle on Kim Shin-wook at the end of the first half. Belgium scored the only goal of the match in the second half, when substitute Divock Origi's shot was parried by South Korea goalkeeper Kim Seung-gyu and Jan Vertonghen converted the rebound with his left foot.

Belgium's win ensured that they topped their group, while South Korea, who had to win by two goals to have any chance for qualification to the knockout stage, were eliminated.

South Korea's elimination meant that all four Asian representatives finished bottom of their group with a combined record of zero wins, three draws and nine defeats, the worst showing by the Asian Football Confederation since the 1990 World Cup.

26 June 2014
17:00 BRT (UTC−3)

South Korea	0–1	Belgium
		Vertonghen 78'

Arena de São Paulo, São Paulo
Attendance: 61,397
Referee: Ben Williams (Australia)

South Korea	Belgium

GK	21	Kim Seung-gyu
RB	12	Lee Yong
CB	5	Kim Young-gwon
CB	20	Hong Jeong-ho	(yellow card) 35'
LB	3	Yun Suk-young
CM	14	Han Kook-young		(substituted off) 46'
CM	16	Ki Sung-yueng
RW	17	Lee Chung-yong
AM	13	Koo Ja-cheol (c)
LW	9	Son Heung-min		(substituted off) 73'
CF	18	Kim Shin-wook		(substituted off) 66'
Substitutions:
FW	11	Lee Keun-ho		(substituted on) 46'
MF	7	Kim Bo-kyung		(substituted on) 66'
FW	19	Ji Dong-won		(substituted on) 73'
Manager:
Hong Myung-bo

GK	1	Thibaut Courtois
RB	21	Anthony Vanden Borre
CB	15	Daniel Van Buyten
CB	18	Nicolas Lombaerts
LB	5	Jan Vertonghen (c)
CM	16	Steven Defour	(red card) 45'
CM	19	Moussa Dembélé	(yellow card) 50'
RW	14	Dries Mertens		(substituted off) 60'
AM	8	Marouane Fellaini
LW	20	Adnan Januzaj		(substituted off) 60'
CF	11	Kevin Mirallas		(substituted off) 88'
Substitutions:
MF	22	Nacer Chadli		(substituted on) 60'
FW	17	Divock Origi		(substituted on) 60'
MF	10	Eden Hazard		(substituted on) 88'
Manager:
Marc Wilmots

Man of the Match:
Jan Vertonghen (Belgium)

Assistant referees:
Matthew Cream (Australia)
Hakan Anaz (Australia)
Fourth official:
Víctor Hugo Carrillo (Peru)
Fifth official:
Rodney Aquino (Paraguay)

=== Algeria vs Russia ===
The two teams had met in three previous matches (only involving matches during the time period of the Soviet Union).

Aleksandr Kokorin opened the scoring for Russia, who had to win to have chance of qualifying for the knockout stage, in the 6th minute when he scored with a header after a cross from Dmitri Kombarov from the left. Algeria equalised in the 60th minute when Islam Slimani scored with a header at the back post after a free kick from the left by Yacine Brahimi was missed by Russian goalkeeper Igor Akinfeev. Algeria held on for the draw, and as South Korea lost to Belgium in the other match played at the same time, Algeria finished as group runners-up and reached the second round for the first time in their history (after unsuccessful campaigns in 1982, 1986, and 2010), while Russia failed to advance out of the group stage in all three tournaments since the break-up of the Soviet Union.

For Algeria's goal, television replays showed that Akinfeev had a green laser light shining in his face during the play. After the match the Algerian Football Federation was fined 50,000 CHF by FIFA for the use of laser pointers, a prohibited item in the stadium according to FIFA Stadium Safety and Security Regulations, and other violations of the rules by Algerian fans.

With fellow African representative Nigeria also reaching the knockout stage earlier, this was the first time that there were two teams from the Confederation of African Football in the knockout stage of a World Cup.

26 June 2014
17:00 BRT (UTC−3)

Algeria	1–1	Russia
Slimani 60'		Kokorin 6'

Arena da Baixada, Curitiba
Attendance: 39,311
Referee: Cüneyt Çakır (Turkey)

Algeria	Russia

GK	23	Raïs M'Bolhi
RB	20	Aïssa Mandi
CB	4	Essaïd Belkalem
CB	5	Rafik Halliche (c)
LB	6	Djamel Mesbah	(yellow card) 39'
CM	12	Carl Medjani
CM	14	Nabil Bentaleb
RW	10	Sofiane Feghouli
AM	11	Yacine Brahimi		(substituted off) 71'
LW	18	Abdelmoumene Djabou		(substituted off) 77'
CF	13	Islam Slimani		(substituted off) 90+2'
Substitutions:
MF	7	Hassan Yebda		(substituted on) 71'
FW	9	Nabil Ghilas	(yellow card) 87'	(substituted on) 77'
FW	15	Hillal Soudani		(substituted on) 90+2'
Other disciplinary actions:
DF	17	Liassine Cadamuro	(yellow card) 90+2'
Manager:
(Bosnia and Herzegovina) Vahid Halilhodžić

GK	1	Igor Akinfeev
RB	2	Aleksei Kozlov	(yellow card) 59'
CB	14	Vasili Berezutski (c)
CB	4	Sergei Ignashevich
LB	23	Dmitri Kombarov	(yellow card) 57'
CM	8	Denis Glushakov		(substituted off) 46'
CM	20	Viktor Fayzulin
RW	19	Aleksandr Samedov
AM	9	Aleksandr Kokorin
LW	17	Oleg Shatov		(substituted off) 67'
CF	11	Aleksandr Kerzhakov		(substituted off) 81'
Substitutions:
MF	7	Igor Denisov		(substituted on) 46'
MF	10	Alan Dzagoev		(substituted on) 67'
FW	6	Maksim Kanunnikov		(substituted on) 81'
Manager:
(Italy) Fabio Capello

Man of the Match:
Islam Slimani (Algeria)

Assistant referees:
Bahattin Duran (Turkey)
Tarık Ongun (Turkey)
Fourth official:
Joel Aguilar (El Salvador)
Fifth official:
Juan Zumba (El Salvador)

== See also ==
- Algeria at the FIFA World Cup
- Belgium at the FIFA World Cup
- Russia at the FIFA World Cup
- South Korea at the FIFA World Cup
