= Baraki, Afghanistan =

Baraki برکی
- Location in Afghanistan
- Coordinates: 34°20′N 67°03′E
- Country: Afghanistan
- Province: Bamyan
- Time zone: + 4.30

Baraki (Persian: برکی) is a village in Bamyan Province in northern-central Afghanistan.

== See also ==
- Bamyan Province
