= Rafik Halliche =

Algerian footballer (born 1986)

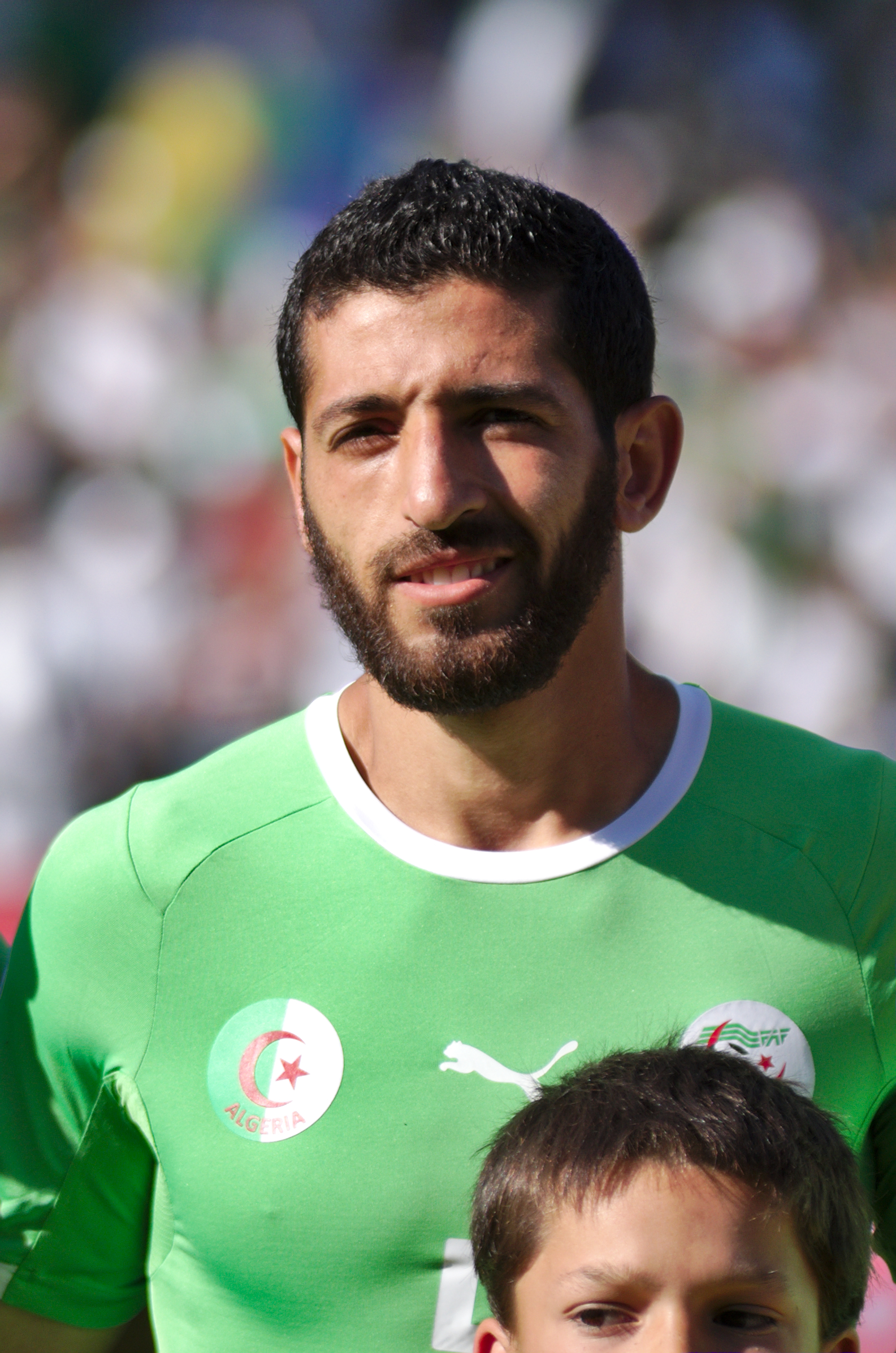
- Halliche with Algeria in 2014

Personal information
- Full name: Rafik Halliche
- Date of birth: 2 September 1986 (age 40)
- Place of birth: Algiers, Algeria
- Height: 1.87 m (6 ft 2 in)
- Position: Centre back

Youth career
- 1993–2000: CREPS Ben Aknoun
- 2000–2005: NA Hussein Dey

Senior career*
Years	Team	Apps	(Gls)
2005–2008	NA Hussein Dey	45	(1)
2008–2010	Benfica	0	(0)
2008–2010	→ Nacional (loan)	34	(0)
2010–2012	Fulham	1	(0)
2012–2014	Académica	29	(0)
2014–2017	Qatar SC	43	(5)
2017–2018	Estoril	23	(2)
2018–2020	Moreirense	31	(1)
Total		206	(9)

International career^{‡}
2006–2008	Algeria U23	6	(0)
2008–2019	Algeria	41	(3)
Medal record
Men's football
Representing Algeria
Africa Cup of Nations
Winner	2019 Egypt
- * Club domestic league appearances and goals as of 26 July 2022 ‡ National team caps and goals as of 23:55, 9 September 2022 (UTC)

Rafik Halliche (Arabic: رفيق حليش; born 2 September 1986) is an Algerian former professional footballer who played as a central defender.

He started playing in 2005 with Hussein Dey, going on to spend the vast majority of his career in Portugal. He also had spells in England, with Fulham, and in Qatar.

An Algerian international since 2008, Halliche represented the nation in two World Cups and four Africa Cup of Nations, winning the 2019 edition of the latter tournament.

== Club career ==
=== Early years ===
Born in Algiers, Halliche began playing football at the age of seven with CREPS Ben Aknoun. After seven years with the club he joined the junior ranks of NA Hussein Dey, making his senior debut on 30 January 2006 in a league match against Paradou AC, coming on as a substitute in the 74th minute.

=== Nacional ===
In the January 2008 transfer window, Halliche received interest from several French sides, including AJ Auxerre and Valenciennes FC. However, on 30 January, he signed a four-year contract with Portugal's S.L. Benfica, which immediately loaned him to fellow Primeira Liga team C.D. Nacional until the end of the season.

On 30 March 2008, Halliche made his debut for Nacional, coming on at half-time in a 2–0 home league win against U.D. Leiria. He would go on to make two more appearances as a starter before going back to Benfica at the end of the loan, which was then extended for the entirety of 2008–09 and also the following campaign.

=== Fulham ===
On 16 August 2010, Halliche was reported to be linked with a move to Premier League club Fulham, for £1.3 million. The following week, Benfica confirmed the sale of the player, who signed a three-year deal for an undisclosed fee.

Halliche made his official début 8 January 2011, replacing Brede Hangeland in the FA Cup's third round tie against Peterborough United: he conceded a penalty in the 85th minute for tripping Craig Mackail-Smith, in an eventual 6–2 win. His first league appearance came on the 22nd, again from the bench (for Aaron Hughes), in a 2–0 home victory over Stoke City.

Swansea City made a successful loan bid for Halliche during the 2011 summer transfer window, but several weeks after the deadline, FIFA denied international clearance to Swansea for both his move and Darnel Situ's move from RC Lens, leaving the defender as a Fulham player subject to an appeal by the Welsh side.

On 6 December 2011, Halliche went on a week-long trial with Celtic in the Scottish Premier League, but nothing came of it. On 31 August of the following year, Fulham confirmed that the player's contract had been terminated by mutual consent.

=== Académica ===
Halliche returned to Portugal on 31 August 2012, signing a two-year deal with Académica de Coimbra. During his spell, he battled for first-choice status with Aníbal Capela and João Real.

=== Qatar SC ===
On 13 July 2014, Halliche signed for Qatar SC.

== International career ==
Halliche made his debut for Algeria on 31 May 2008 against Senegal, replacing Anthar Yahia in the 75th minute. On 18 November 2009 he started in the decisive tie-breaker against Egypt for the 2010 FIFA World Cup qualifiers, as the national side won 1–0 in Sudan and returned to the FIFA World Cup 24 years after their last presence.

Halliche was also summoned for the 2010 Africa Cup of Nations in Angola: he kept the national side's qualification hopes alive after scoring the only goal in a win against Mali, after a loss to Malawi in the opener. In the semi-finals he was sent off in the first half after being given two yellow cards, the last one also resulting in a penalty, in a 0–4 loss to Egypt.

Halliche was picked to represent Algeria in the 2010 World Cup in South Africa, playing all the matches and minutes as the national side only conceded two goals in the group stage, but finished last in their group after failing to score once. He was also selected to the following edition by coach Vahid Halilhodžić, as captain, and contributed decisively to a 4–2 group victory over South Korea on 22 June, heading home from a corner kick for his country's second goal.

== Career statistics ==
=== International ===
As of match played on 9 September 2019

Appearances and goals by national team and year
National team	Year	Apps	Goals
Algeria	2008	2	0
Algeria	2009	7	0
Algeria	2010	12	1
Algeria	2011	0	0
Algeria	2012	0	0
Algeria	2013	5	0
Algeria	2014	10	2
Algeria	2015	2	0
Algeria	2016	0	0
Algeria	2017	0	0
Algeria	2018	0	0
Algeria	2019	3	0
Total		41	3

As of 11 October 2014
Scores and results list Algeria's goal tally first, score column indicates score after each Halliche goal.

List of international goals scored by Rafik Halliche
No.	Date	Venue	Opponent	Score	Result	Competition
1	14 January 2010	11 de Novembro, Luanda, Angola	Mali	1–0	1–0	2010 Africa Cup of Nations
2	22 June 2014	Beira-Rio, Porto Alegre, Brazil	South Korea	2–0	4–2	2014 FIFA World Cup
3	11 October 2014	Kamuzu Stadium, Blantyre, Malawi	Malawi	1–0	2–0	2015 Africa Cup of Nations qualification

== Honours ==
Algeria

- Africa Cup of Nations: 2019
