= Islam Slimani =

Algerian footballer (born 1988)

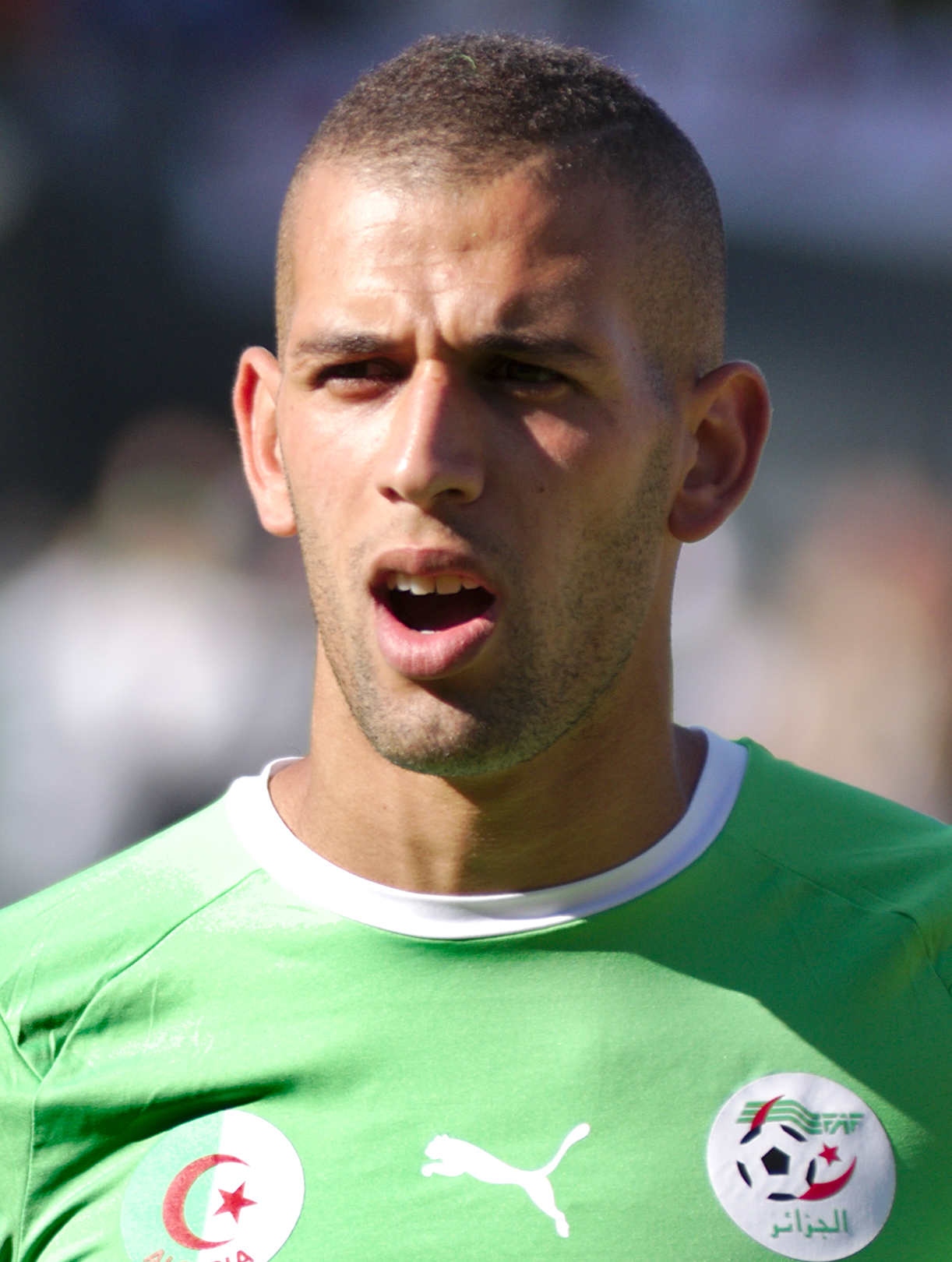
- Slimani with Algeria in 2014

Personal information
- Full name: Islam Slimani
- Date of birth: 18 June 1988 (age 38)
- Place of birth: Algiers, Algeria
- Height: 1.88 m (6 ft 2 in)
- Position: Striker

Youth career
- 2003–2006: WB Aïn Benian

Senior career*
Years	Team	Apps	(Gls)
2007–2009	JSM Chéraga	38	(19)
2009–2013	CR Belouizdad	98	(32)
2013–2016	Sporting CP	82	(48)
2013	Sporting CP B	1	(0)
2016–2021	Leicester City	36	(8)
2018	→ Newcastle United (loan)	4	(0)
2018–2019	→ Fenerbahçe (loan)	15	(1)
2019–2020	→ Monaco (loan)	18	(9)
2021–2022	Lyon	30	(4)
2022	Sporting CP	9	(4)
2022–2023	Brest	16	(1)
2023	Anderlecht	10	(8)
2023–2024	Coritiba	11	(3)
2024	Mechelen	13	(3)
2024–2025	CR Belouizdad	8	(3)
2025	→ Westerlo (loan)	18	(2)
2025–2026	CFR Cluj	14	(1)

International career^{‡}
2012–2025	Algeria	105	(46)
Medal record
Men's football
Representing Algeria
Africa Cup of Nations
Winner	2019 Egypt
- * Club domestic league appearances and goals as of 15 April 2026 ‡ National team caps and goals as of 9 December 2025

Islam Slimani (Arabic: إِسْلَام سُلَيْمَانِيّ; born 18 June 1988) is an Algerian professional footballer who plays as a striker. He is the all-time top goalscorer for the Algeria national team.

Slimani began his career in his homeland with JSM Chéraga and CR Belouizdad. In 2013, he moved to Europe, signing for Sporting CP. He played and scored regularly during his three seasons in Portugal, helping his team win the Taça de Portugal in 2015. In 2016, Slimani was transferred to Leicester City for a club record £28 million fee. After a season and a half in the Leicester squad, he was sent on successive loans to Newcastle United, Fenerbahçe, and Monaco.

In 2021, Slimani joined Lyon. One year later, he briefly returned to Sporting CP, leaving after six months. Slimani then went on to join Brest, Anderlecht, Coritiba, and Mechelen in short stints. He returned to Algeria with CR Belouizdad in 2024 and went on loan to Westerlo in 2025.

An Algerian international, Slimani made his international debut in 2012 and played at the Africa Cup of Nations in 2013, 2015, 2017, 2021 and 2023, and was also a part of the Algeria side that won the 2019 tournament. He was additionally part of Algeria's squad at the 2014 FIFA World Cup, where he finished as the team's joint top scorer with two goals. As of December 2025, he has won over 100 international caps and scored 46 goals, making him Algeria's highest all-time goalscorer.

== Club career ==
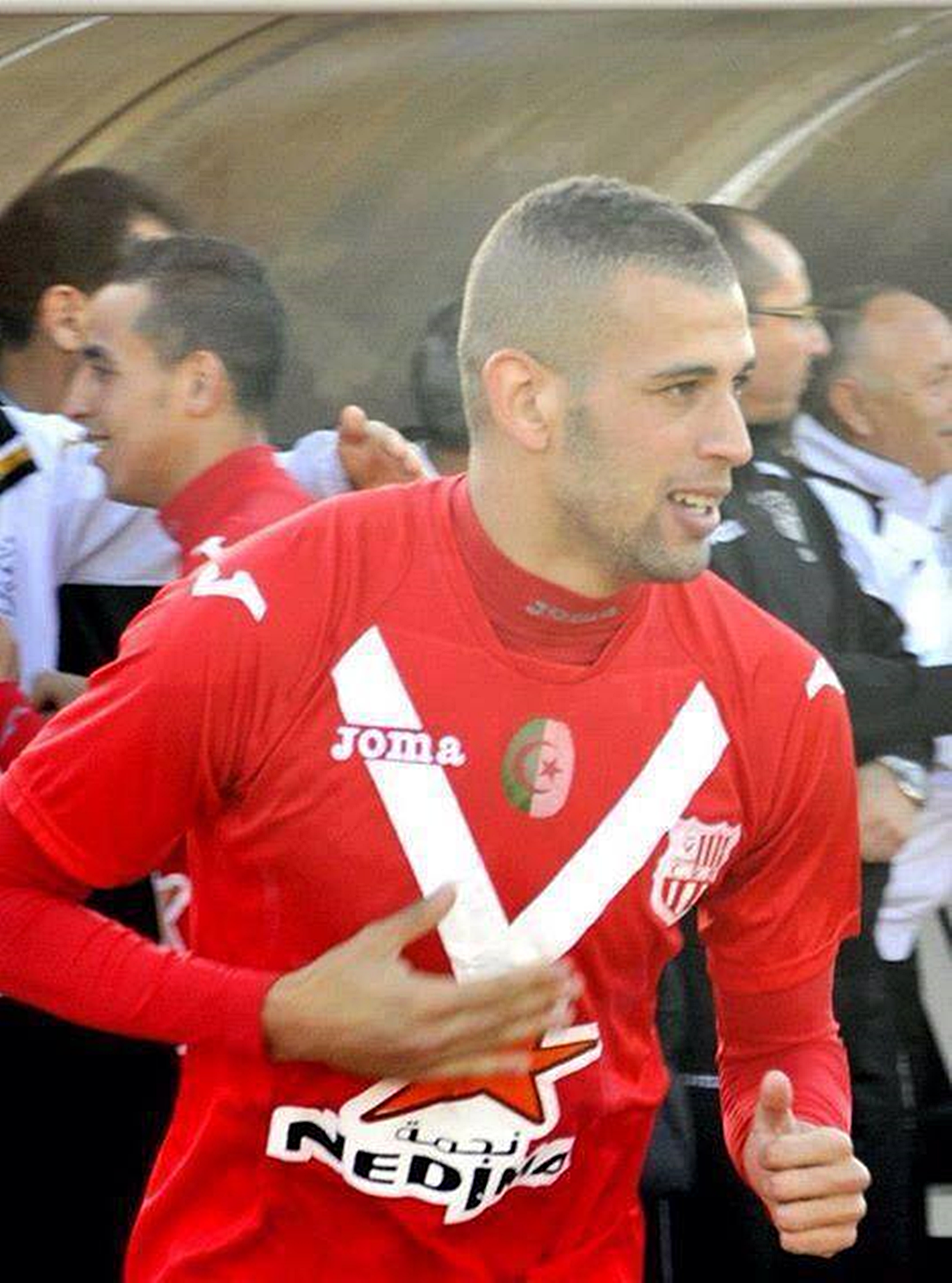
Slimani playing for CR Belouizdad in 2012

=== Early career ===
In May 2009, Slimani joined CR Belouizdad from JSM Chéraga for a transfer fee of 800,000 Algerian dinars, signing a two-year contract. In August, he made his official debut for the club as a starter against MC Oran in the first week of the 2009–10 Algerian Championnat National. He finished his first season with Belouizdad with 8 goals in 30 games.

On 17 May 2011, Slimani scored four goals in a league game against JS Kabylie, leading CR Belouizdad to an impressive 7–1 win. In July 2011, with his contract expired and several French clubs such as Nice and Le Havre showing interest in signing him, Slimani decided to sign a two-year extension with CR Belouizdad.

=== Sporting CP ===
==== 2013–14 season ====
On 6 August 2013, Slimani joined Sporting CP for an undisclosed fee. He started the 2013–14 season as a substitute, gaining a reputation as an impact player due to him scoring vital goals when coming off the bench. Due to the lack of form of Fredy Montero, however, Slimani became a starter and scored four goals in four matches in early March 2014 against Rio Ave, Braga, Vitória de Setúbal and in 1–0 over rivals Porto. In December 2013 he was considered the best Algerian footballer of the year as he won the Algerian Golden Ball.

==== 2014–15 season ====
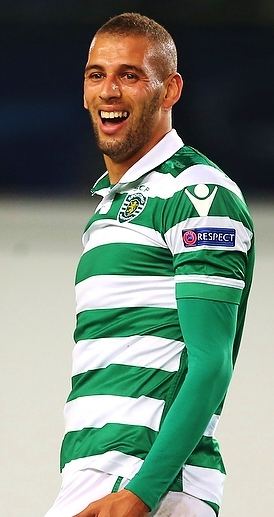
Slimani with Sporting CP in 2015

In his second season Slimani was successful as he became a key player. His first goal of the season was in the Lisbon derby 1–1 away draw to Benfica. At European level Slimani scored his first goal against Schalke 04 at Estádio José Alvalade in the last minute to finish 4–2 for Sporting. At the end of the season he finished third in the league, but in the Taça de Portugal he reached the final against Braga on 31 May 2015, slimani scored a goal helping Sporting turn around a two-goal deficit to eventually secure the cup following a penalty shootout 3–1. where he achieved his first title in his history at the end of the season Slimani played 33 games and scored 15 goals, including 12 in the league.

==== 2015–16 season ====
In the 2015–16 season, Slimani said it would be his last season and that he aspires to achieve the title of the Primeira Liga, which had been absent from the club for 14 years. The new and former Benfica coach Jorge Jesus said he would rely heavily on Slimani to win the titles and the start was in the Supertaça against Benfica and ended for Sporting with a single goal, achieving his second title. At the start of the tournament, Slimani scored his first goal against Académica in an away match on 4 October 2015, and in the seventh round against Vitória de Guimarães, he scored his first hat-trick in the Portuguese league. At the top of the 15th round, Slimani managed to score two goals against Porto's goalkeeper Iker Casillas to lead the team back to the top of the league. After this game, Slimani scored in four consecutive games 6 goals against Vitória de Setúbal, Braga, Tondela and Paços de Ferreira. After two matches, he returned to score twice at Nacional.

Before Sporting's league derby match at home, Benfica lodged a complaint against Slimani for assaulting Andreas Samaris with his elbow in a Portuguese Cup match on 21 November 2015. After a long wait and one day before the match, the Portuguese League announced that Slimani could participate in the decisive match for the title. However, the team lost 1–0 and dropped to second place, behind Benfica. One week later, he scored his 20th goal this season in the match against Estoril. After this meeting, he scored four goals against Belenenses, Marítimo and Moreirense, and Porto. Slimani contributed to the victory at Estádio do Dragão after scoring two goals. In the final round, he scored his 27th goal of the season against Braga. The match ended 4–0 but was not enough for Sporting to win the league title, as Benfica ended with more two points. That season, Slimani scored 27 goals in the league but finished behind top scorer Jonas, with 32 goals.

For the following season, Sporting wanted to retain Slimani but he insisted on leaving the club, and that was finally accepted by the administration. On 28 August 2016, he played his last match against Porto at Estádio José Alvalade and scored his last goal to finish 2–1 for Sporting.

=== Leicester City ===
==== 2016–17 season ====
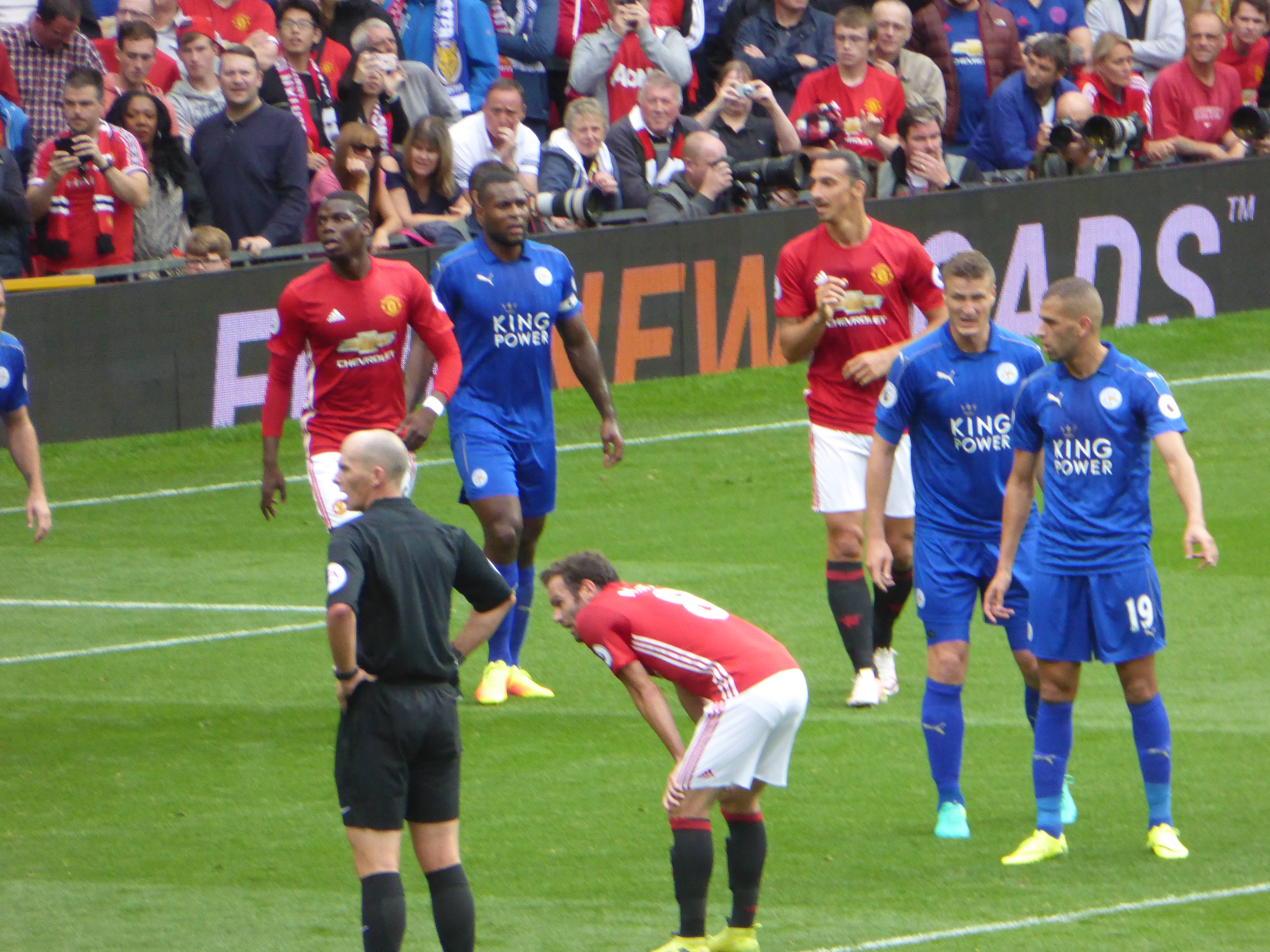
Slimani (far right) with Leicester City against Manchester United

On 31 August 2016, the last day of the 2016–17 summer transfer window in England, Slimani joined Premier League champions Leicester City on a five-year contract. The transfer fee paid to Sporting was reported as £28 million, a club record for Leicester. Leicester had beaten West Bromwich Albion to sign Slimani.

On 14 September, he made his debut for Leicester in the UEFA Champions League playing 62 minutes in a 3–0 victory over Club Brugge. Three days later, he made his Premier League debut in a 3–0 victory over Burnley, scoring his side's first two goals. On 27 September, Slimani scored the only goal in Leicester's 1–0 win against Porto in the Champions League group stage after a pass from Algerian national teammate Riyad Mahrez. It was his sixth goal with Iker Casillas in goal in 2016, five of which he netted while with his former club Sporting.

After this goal, Slimani failed to score until matchday 11 of the Premier League against West Bromwich Albion from a pass from Mahrez, although Leicester lost 2–1. Later, on matchday 13, after entering as a substitute, Slimani scored the equalizer for his team from the penalty spot in the last minute against Middlesbrough. On matchday 15, Slimani helped the Foxes to win against Manchester City 4–2 after he presented two assists for goalscorers Jamie Vardy and Andy King. On 31 December, after five games without a goal, Slimani scored the winning goal against West Ham United at the King Power Stadium to lead his team to their fifth win in the Premier League that season, on the last day of 2016.

Slimani scored four of his five league goals from headers, but had only managed a 38% shot accuracy by January 2017. After his participation in the Africa Cup of Nations, Slimani returned to the club injured, which affected the rest of his season where he did not participate very much and scored only two goals, against Sunderland and against Everton. In the League Cup match against Sheffield United, he scored two goals.

==== 2017–18 season: Newcastle United (loan) ====
On 31 January 2018, Slimani signed for Newcastle United on loan until the end of the season. A thigh injury prevented him from making his debut for the club, which eventually happened exactly two months after signing, in a 1–0 win over Huddersfield Town, and he was involved in the build-up for the only goal of the game, scored by Ayoze Pérez. On 15 April, Slimani was again involved in the build-up for the match winning goal in a 2–1 win over Arsenal, after his header was flicked on by Pérez, and into the path of Matt Ritchie.

On 3 May, Slimani was given a three match ban for violent conduct after an off-the-ball incident with West Bromwich Albion's Craig Dawson, effectively ending his season with Newcastle.

==== Fenerbahçe (loan) ====
On 11 August 2018, Slimani joined Süper Lig club Fenerbahçe on a season-long loan. He made his debut on 18 August 2018, playing the full 90 minutes in 1–0 loss to Yeni Malatyaspor. His first goal for the club came on 1 September 2018 when he scored Fenerbahçe's second goal of their 3–2 loss to Kayserispor.

==== Monaco (loan) ====
On 21 August 2019, Slimani joined Ligue 1 club Monaco on a season-long loan. Despite scoring nine goals and seven assists in 18 league games before the Ligue 1 season was abruptly concluded due to the COVID-19 pandemic in May, Monaco chose not to give Slimani a permanent contract.

=== Lyon ===
On 13 January 2021, Slimani signed with Ligue 1 club Lyon. On 18 January 2021, he made his league debut, coming on as a substitute for Tino Kadewere in the 76th minute, in a 0–1 loss to Metz. He scored his first goal for the club on 9 February in a 5–1 Coupe de France victory against Ajaccio. He scored his first league goal for the club on 21 March, after coming on as a substitute, in a 4–2 loss to Paris Saint Germain.

On 1 February 2022, Slimani's contract with Lyon was terminated by mutual consent, effectively making him a free agent.

=== Return to Sporting CP ===
Slimani returned to Sporting CP immediately after his contract with Lyon was rescinded, signing a one-and-a-half-year contract. He made his comeback on the pitch for Leões on 6 February 2022, coming off the bench in the 74th minute for Pedro Porro in a 2–0 league victory against Famalicão. His first goal upon returning came on 26 February in a 1–1 away draw on Madeira against Marítimo, firing in a cross from Matheus Reis.

=== Short stints in Europe and Brazil before returning to Algeria ===
==== Brest ====
On 25 August 2022, Slimani signed with Ligue 1 side Brest.

==== Anderlecht ====
On 1 February 2023, Belgian Pro League club Anderlecht announced the signing of Slimani on a contract until the end of the 2022–23 season.

==== Coritiba ====
On 20 August 2023, Brazilian club Coritiba officially announced Slimani's signing with a contract running until December 2024.

==== Mechelen ====
On 1 February 2024, Slimani signed for Belgian side Mechelen until the end of the 2023–24 season.

==== Return to CR Belouizdad ====
In September 2024, Slimani rejoined Algerian club CR Belouizdad.

==== Loan to Westerlo ====
On 16 January 2025, Slimani returned to Belgium and signed with Westerlo on loan until the end of the 2024–25 season.

==== CFR Cluj ====
In September 2025, Slimani signed with Romanian Liga I club CFR Cluj, until June 2026.

== International career ==
In October 2009, Slimani was called up by Abdelhak Benchikha for the first time to the Algeria A' National Team for a week-long training camp in Algiers. In March 2010, Slimani was called up again, this time for a 2011 African Nations Championship qualifier against Libya as a replacement for his injured CR Belouizdad teammate Youcef Saïbi. However, Slimani did not play in the game that Algeria won 1–0.

In May 2012, Slimani was called up for the first time to the Algeria national team for the 2014 FIFA World Cup qualifiers against Mali and Rwanda, and the return leg of the 2013 Africa Cup of Nations qualifier against Gambia. On 26 May, he made his debut, coming as a substitute at half-time in a friendly against Niger. A week later, on 2 June, Slimani scored his first international goal for Algeria, netting the third goal in the 4–0 win over Rwanda in the 2014 FIFA World Cup qualifiers. He followed that up with another goal against Mali in the next game, and then scored another two goals in the following against Gambia.

Slimani was selected for Algeria's squad taking part in the 2013 Africa Cup of Nations, and played in all three group games in January. Algeria, however, only won one point and were eliminated at the first stage.

Algeria qualified for the 2014 World Cup, with manager Vahid Halilhodžić selecting Slimani for his 23-man squad. On 22 June 2014, Slimani scored the opening goal for les Fennecs in a 4–2 group match against South Korea. He also made an assist for the team's third goal by passing the ball to Abdelmoumene Djabou. On 26 June, Slimani scored with a header in Algeria's 1–1 draw with Russia, helping the nation qualify for the knockout rounds of the World Cup for the first time ever after failing to do so previously in 1982, 1986 and 2010. In the round of 16 match against Germany, Slimani had a headed goal disallowed in the first half for offside, while later on, his powerful shot at goal was saved by German goalkeeper Manuel Neuer. Algeria eventually lost 2–1 after extra time, but were praised for an excellent campaign throughout the tournament.

In Algeria's opening match of the 2015 Africa Cup of Nations, Slimani scored the final goal in a 3–1 victory over South Africa.

Slimani was part of the Algeria team that won the 2019 Africa Cup of Nations, scoring one goal in the tournament against Tanzania in the group stage.

On 2 September 2021, Slimani scored four goals in an 8–0 thrashing of Djibouti in qualifying for the 2022 FIFA World Cup. On 8 October 2021, he scored a brace in a 6–1 heavy victory over Niger in a 2022 FIFA World Cup qualifying match to become the Algeria's all-time top scorer with 38 goals surpassing Abdelhafid Tasfaout who held the record with 36 goals for 19 years since 2002.

In December 2023, he was named in Algeria's squad for the 2023 Africa Cup of Nations. He played his 100th match with the national team in the opening match of the African tournament against Angola.

== Career statistics ==
=== Club ===
As of match played 16 March 2026

Appearances and goals by club, season and competition
Club	Season	League			National cup (Note: Includes Algerian Cup, Taça de Portugal, FA Cup, Turkish Cup)		League cup (Note: Includes Taça da Liga, EFL Cup, Coupe de la Ligue)		Continental		Other		Total	
Club	Season	Division	Apps	Goals	Apps	Goals	Apps	Goals	Apps	Goals	Apps	Goals	Apps	Goals
JSM Chéraga	2007–08	Algerian Championnat National 2	18	1	?	?	—		—		—		18	1
JSM Chéraga	2008–09	Division Nationale Amateur	20	18	?	?	—		—		—		20	18
JSM Chéraga	Total		38	19	0	0	—		—		—		38	19
CR Belouizdad	2009–10	Algerian Championnat National	30	8	3	1	—		8 (Note: Appearances in CAF Confederation Cup)	1	—		41	10
CR Belouizdad	2010–11	Algerian Ligue 1	27	10	3	1	—		—		—		30	11
CR Belouizdad	2011–12	Algerian Ligue 1	26	10	5	2	—		—		—		31	12
CR Belouizdad	2012–13	Algerian Ligue 1	15	4	3	4	—		—		2 (Note: Appearances in UAFA Club Cup)	2	20	10
CR Belouizdad	Total		98	32	14	8	—		8	1	2	2	122	43
Sporting CP	2013–14	Primeira Liga	26	8	2	2	2	0	—		—		30	10
Sporting CP	2014–15	Primeira Liga	21	12	5	1	0	0	7 (Note: Six appearances and two goals in UEFA Champions League, one appearance in UEFA Europa League)	2	—		33	15
Sporting CP	2015–16	Primeira Liga	33	27	2	2	1	0	7 (Note: Two appearances and one goal in UEFA Champions League, seven appearances and one goal in UEFA Europa League)	2	1 (Note: Appearance in Supertaça Cândido de Oliveira)	0	44	31
Sporting CP	2016–17	Primeira Liga	2	1	—		—		—		—		2	1
Sporting CP	Total		82	48	9	5	3	0	14	4	1	0	109	57
Sporting CP B	2013–14	Segunda Liga	1	0	—		—		—		—		1	0
Leicester City	2016–17	Premier League	23	7	1	0	—		5 (Note: Appearance(s) in UEFA Champions League)	1	—		29	8
Leicester City	2017–18	Premier League	12	1	3	0	3	4	—		—		18	5
Leicester City	2020–21	Premier League	1	0	0	0	0	0	0	0	—		1	0
Leicester City	Total		36	8	4	0	3	4	5	1	—		48	13
Newcastle United (loan)	2017–18	Premier League	4	0	—		—		—		—		4	0
Fenerbahçe (loan)	2018–19	Süper Lig	15	1	3	1	—		7 (Note: Appearances in UEFA Europa League)	3	—		25	5
Monaco (loan)	2019–20	Ligue 1	18	9	0	0	1	0	—		—		19	9
Lyon	2020–21	Ligue 1	18	3	3	1	—		—		—		21	4
Lyon	2021–22	Ligue 1	12	1	0	0	—		4	3	—		16	4
Lyon	Total		30	4	3	1	0	0	4	3	—		37	8
Sporting CP	2021–22	Primeira Liga	9	4	1	0	—		2	0	—		12	4
Brest	2022–23	Ligue 1	16	1	2	1	—		—		—		18	2
Anderlecht	2022–23	Belgian Pro League	10	8	—		—		6 (Note: Appearances in UEFA Europa Conference League)	1	—		16	9
Coritiba	2023	Série A	11	3	—		—		—		—		11	3
Mechelen	2023–24	Belgian Pro League	13	3	—		—		—		—		13	3
CR Belouizdad	2024–25	Algerian Ligue 1	8	3	1	0	—		3 (Note: Appearances in CAF Champions League)	0	—		12	3
Westerlo (loan)	2024–25	Belgian Pro League	18	2	—		—		—		—		18	2
CFR Cluj	2025–26	Liga I	14	1	2	0	—		—		—		16	1
Career total			421	146	39	16	6	4	49	13	3	2	519	181

=== International ===
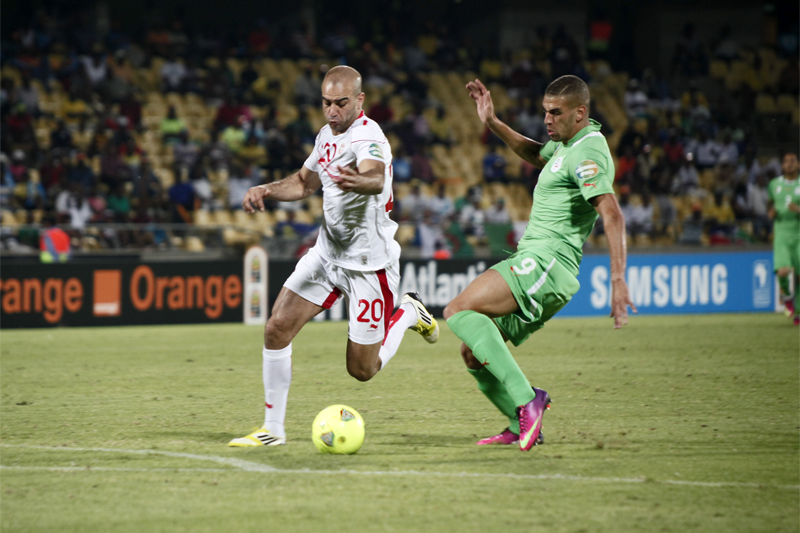
Slimani being tackled by Tunisian Aymen Abdennour at the 2013 Africa Cup of Nations

As of match played 9 December 2025

Appearances and goals by national team and year
National team	Year	Apps	Goals
Algeria	2012	6	5
Algeria	2013	11	4
Algeria	2014	13	4
Algeria	2015	11	7
Algeria	2016	5	3
Algeria	2017	9	3
Algeria	2018	4	0
Algeria	2019	9	3
Algeria	2020	0	0
Algeria	2021	11	9
Algeria	2022	12	3
Algeria	2023	6	3
Algeria	2024	5	2
Algeria	2025	3	0
Total		105	46

== Honours ==
CR Belouizdad

- Algerian Cup runner-up: 2011–12

Sporting CP

- Taça de Portugal: 2014–15
- Supertaça Cândido de Oliveira: 2015

Algeria

- Africa Cup of Nations: 2019

Individual

- Algerian Footballer of the Year: 2013
- SJPF Player of the Month: December 2015
- Leões/Lions Awards 2016: Player of the Season

Orders

- : Achir of the National Order of Merit: 2019

== See also ==
- List of men's footballers with 100 or more international caps
- List of top international men's football goalscorers by country
