= Hillal Soudani =

Algerian footballer (born 1987)

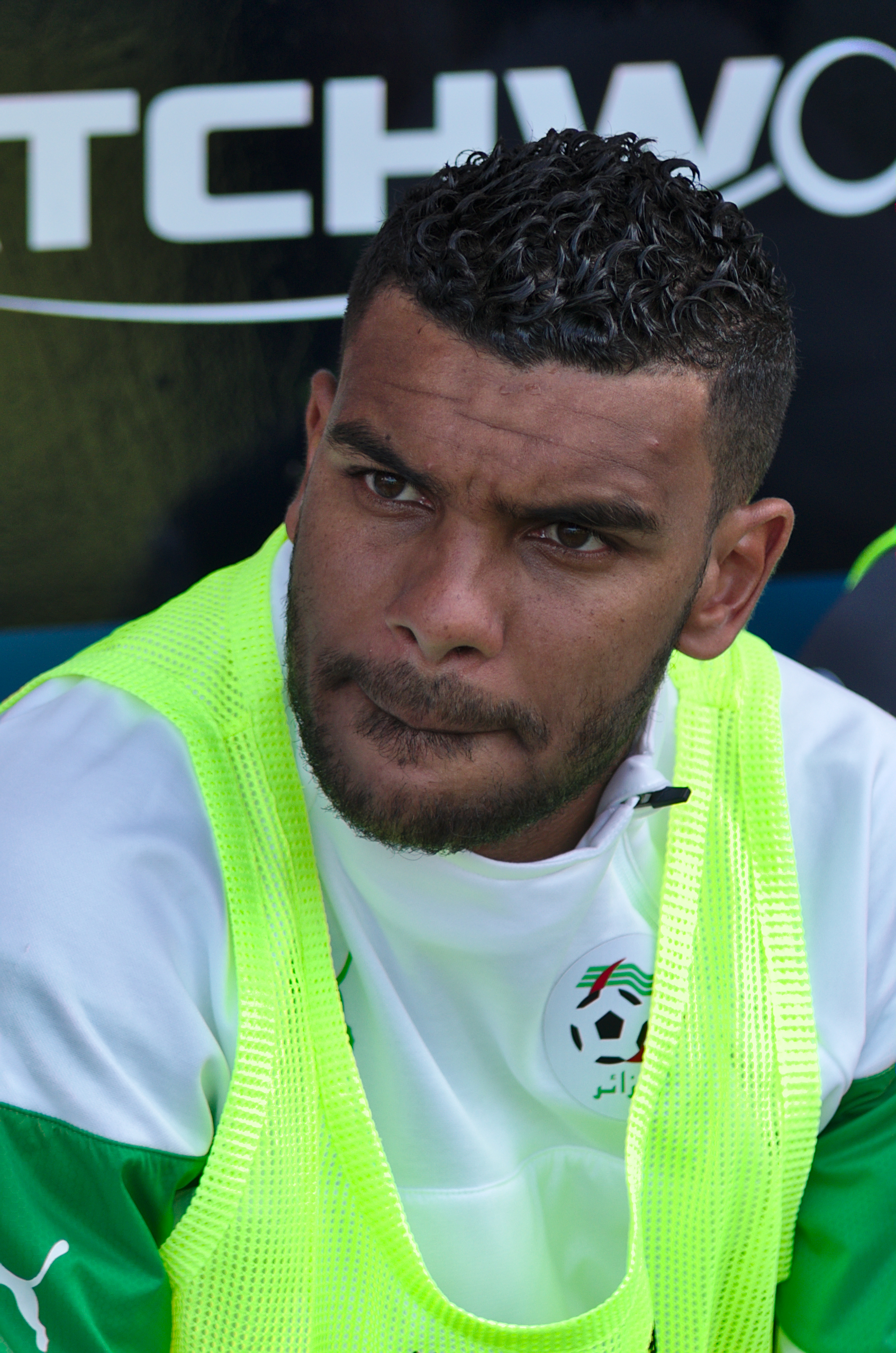
- Soudani with Algeria in 2014

Personal information
- Full name: El Arabi Hilal Soudani
- Date of birth: 25 November 1987 (age 38)
- Place of birth: Chlef, Algeria
- Height: 1.77 m (5 ft 10 in)
- Positions: Winger; second striker

Team information
- Current team: Kustošija
- Number: 2

Youth career
- 1998–2006: ASO Chlef

Senior career*
Years	Team	Apps	(Gls)
2006–2011	ASO Chlef	108	(48)
2011–2013	Vitória de Guimarães	37	(13)
2013–2018	Dinamo Zagreb	132	(69)
2017	Dinamo Zagreb II	1	(0)
2018–2019	Nottingham Forest	6	(2)
2019–2021	Olympiacos	24	(9)
2021	Al Fateh	13	(2)
2021–2023	Damac	45	(14)
2023–2026	Maribor	85	(32)
2026–	Kustošija	0	(0)

International career
2010–2021	Algeria A'	12	(4)
2010–2021	Algeria	56	(24)
Medal record
Men's football
Representing Algeria
FIFA Arab Cup
Winner	2021 Qatar
- * Club domestic league appearances and goals as of 1 June 2026

El Arabi Hilal Soudani (Arabic: العربي هلال سوداني; born 25 November 1987) is an Algerian professional footballer who plays as a winger for Croatian First Football League club Kustošija.

Soudani made his international debut for Algeria in 2010, and featured at the 2013, 2015 and 2017 editions of the Africa Cup of Nations, as well as the 2014 FIFA World Cup in Brazil. Overall, he won 56 international caps and scored 24 goals, making him Algeria's eight highest goalscorer.

== Club career ==
=== ASO Chlef ===
Born in Chlef, Soudani began his career in the junior ranks of his hometown club ASO Chlef. In May 2006, aged 19, he made his first team debut for the club as a substitute against USM Annaba in the 28th round of the 2005–06 Algerian Championnat National, coming on for Samir Zaoui in the 72nd minute.

In 2008, Soudani was chosen as the 2008 Young Player of the Year by DZFoot after scoring 11 goals in 24 games in the 2007–08 season.

In June 2011, Soudani went on trial with French Ligue 2 club Le Mans FC.

=== Vitória de Guimarães ===
On 8 August 2011, Soudani signed a three-year contract with Portuguese club Vitória de Guimarães. The transfer fee was rumoured to be €800,000. On 25 August 2011, Soudani made his official debut for Vitória as a 66th-minute substitute in a 2011–12 UEFA Europa League play-off round match against Atlético Madrid. On 16 October 2011, Soudani opened his scoring account for the club with a brace in the third round of the 2011–12 Taça de Portugal against Moura Atlético Clube. After trailing 1–0, Soudani scored the equaliser in the 89th minute of the match to send the match to extra-time, before scoring the winner in the 117th minute. On 1 April 2012, he scored his first goal in the Primeira Liga in a 3–1 win against Paços de Ferreira. On 21 April, he scored a brace in a 3–2 win against União de Leiria.

On 26 May 2013, Soudani helped Vitória win their first ever Taça de Portugal by beating Benfica 2–1 in the final, scoring the equalising goal in the 79th minute before Ricardo Pereira scored the winner two minutes later. The following day, he travelled to Croatia to complete a medical ahead of a transfer to Dinamo Zagreb.

=== Dinamo Zagreb ===
On 27 May 2013, Soudani signed a four-year contract with Croatian champions Dinamo Zagreb after the club paid a €900,000 transfer fee for his services.

On 6 July 2013, Soudani won the Croatian Supercup with Dinamo against Hajduk Split, also making his debut for Dinamo in the match. He made his Croatian First Football League debut six days later, scoring in a 3–1 win over Osijek. He then scored twice and assisted another goal in Dinamo's 5–0 win over Fola Esch in UEFA Champions League qualifying. Soudani won the Croatian league championship, scoring 16 goals and finishing third in the Golden Boot race behind Dinamo teammates Andrej Kramarić (18) and Duje Čop (22).

In the 2014–15 season, Soudani scored a hat-trick against Astra Giurgiu in the 2014–15 UEFA Europa League group stage. He won his second league championship with Dinamo, scoring 11 goals and assisting 15 in the league, and won his first Croatian Cup.

Soudani's Dinamo completed the league and cup double again in the 2015–16 season, however the player himself had a less successful season, battling injuries and form and finished with eight goals and four assists in the league.

In the 2016–17 season, Soudani's 95th minute extra time goal against Red Bull Salzburg sent Dinamo through to the group stage of the 2016–17 UEFA Champions League. Despite finishing second in the league behind Rijeka — the first time Dinamo had not won the league in 10 seasons — Soudani achieved a career-best 17 goals in the league.

=== Nottingham Forest ===
On 29 June 2018, Soudani joined English club Nottingham Forest on a three-year contract for an undisclosed transfer fee. In the opening four matches of the season, Soudani scored twice before he injured his knee. In October, Soudani then incurred a serious injury to his leg which kept him out of play for the remainder of Nottingham's season.

=== Olympiacos ===
On 18 June 2019, Soudani joined Greek club Olympiacos on a permanent transfer. By mid-November 2019, despite not being in manager Pedro Martins' plans at the beginning of the season, he had made his way into the starting 11 with a series of good performances. In 532 minutes of play, he scored five goals and contributed one assist and was the team's leading scorer in Super League Greece.

On 20 February 2020, in a 1–0 victory against Atromitos, Soudani sustained an anterior cruciate ligament (ACL) injury which was forecast to keep him out of action for at least six months.

On 25 January 2021, after being deemed surplus to requirements by Martins, he was released by mutual consent, six months before the official expiry of his contract.

=== Maribor ===
On 12 June 2023, Soudani signed for Slovenian PrvaLiga club Maribor on a two-year contract. He made his debut on 13 July, starting in a 2023–24 UEFA Europa Conference League first qualifying round match against Birkirkara; however, he sustained an injury in the first half and was substituted out. After more than two-month absence due to injury, Soudani returned to the squad on 24 September, making his league debut in a 1–0 home defeat to Koper.

== International career ==
In February 2011, Soudani was selected by head coach Abdelhak Benchikha as part of the Algerian A' national team for the 2011 African Nations Championship in Sudan. In the opening group stage match, against Uganda, Soudani started and scored a goal in the 61st minute as Algeria won 2–0. In the second group match, against Gabon, Soudani scored a brace with goals in the 71st and 90th minute of the match in a 2–2 draw. Despite not scoring in the remainder of the competition, Soudani finished as one of the top scorers in the competition with three goals.

On 14 May 2011, Soudani was called up by Benchikha to the Algeria national team for the first time for a 2012 Africa Cup of Nations qualifier against Morocco. On 4 June 2011, he made his debut as a substitute for Rafik Djebbour in the 79th minute of the match.

== Career statistics ==
=== Club ===
As of 1 June 2026

Appearances and goals by club, season and competition
Club	Season	League			National cup (Note: Includes Algerian Cup, Taça de Portugal, Croatian Cup, FA Cup, Greek Cup, King Cup, Slovenian Cup)		League cup (Note: Includes Taça da Liga, EFL Cup)		Continental		Other		Total	
Club	Season	Division	Apps	Goals	Apps	Goals	Apps	Goals	Apps	Goals	Apps	Goals	Apps	Goals
ASO Chlef	2005–06	National 1	1	0	0	0	—		—		—		1	0
ASO Chlef	2006–07	National 1	11	3	3	1	—		2	0	—		16	4
ASO Chlef	2007–08	National 1	24	11	2	0	—		—		—		26	11
ASO Chlef	2008–09	National 1	19	4	2	0	—		—		—		21	4
ASO Chlef	2009–10	National 1	28	12	4	4	—		—		—		32	16
ASO Chlef	2010–11	Ligue 1	25	18	3	1	—		—		—		28	19
ASO Chlef	Total		108	48	14	6	—		2	0	—		124	54
Vitória de Guimarães	2011–12	Primeira Liga	16	4	2	2	2	0	1 (Note: Appearances in UEFA Europa League)	0	—		21	6
Vitória de Guimarães	2012–13	Primeira Liga	21	9	3	3	—		—		—		24	12
Vitória de Guimarães	Total		37	13	5	5	2	0	1	0	—		45	18
Dinamo Zagreb	2013–14	Prva HNL	31	16	5	0	—		9 (Note: Five appearances in UEFA Champions League, four appearances in UEFA Europa League)	3	1 (Note: Appearance in Croatian Super Cup)	0	46	19
Dinamo Zagreb	2014–15	Prva HNL	23	11	3	0	—		12 (Note: Four appearances in UEFA Champions League, eight appearances in UEFA Europa League)	5	—		38	16
Dinamo Zagreb	2015–16	Prva HNL	21	8	5	3	—		11 (Note: Appearances in UEFA Champions League)	3	—		37	14
Dinamo Zagreb	2016–17	Prva HNL	29	17	1	0	—		11	2	—		41	19
Dinamo Zagreb	2017–18	Prva HNL	28	17	4	1	—		3	0	—		35	18
Dinamo Zagreb	Total		132	69	18	4	—		46	13	1	0	197	86
Dinamo Zagreb II	2016–17	2. HNL	1	0	—		—		—		—		1	0
Nottingham Forest	2018–19	Championship	6	2	0	0	2	0	—		—		8	2
Olympiacos	2019–20	Super League Greece	19	7	1	0	—		1	0	—		21	7
Olympiacos	2020–21	Super League Greece	5	2	1	0	—		4	0	—		10	2
Olympiacos	Total		24	9	2	0	—		5	0	—		31	9
Al Fateh	2020–21	Saudi Pro League	13	2	2	0	—		—		—		15	2
Damac	2021–22	Saudi Pro League	25	8	0	0	—		—		—		25	8
Damac	2022–23	Saudi Pro League	20	6	1	0	—		—		—		21	6
Damac	Total		45	14	1	0	—		—		—		46	14
Maribor	2023–24	Slovenian PrvaLiga	27	15	3	1	—		1 (Note: Appearances in UEFA Conference League)	0	—		31	16
Maribor	2024–25	Slovenian PrvaLiga	27	9	3	2	—		3 (Note: One appearance in UEFA Europa League, two appearances and one goal in UEFA Conference League)	1	—		33	12
Maribor	2025–26	Slovenian PrvaLiga	31	8	1	0	—		2	0	—		34	8
Maribor	Total		85	32	7	3	—			1	—		98	36
Career total			451	189	49	18	4	0	60	14	1	0	565	221

=== International ===
Goals and appearances by year
Year	Apps	Goals
2010	1	0
2011	2	0
2012	6	6
2013	11	3
2014	9	3
2015	8	5
2016	3	4
2017	6	1
2018	4	0
2019	1	1
2020	0	0
2021	5	1
Total	56	24

Goals by competition
Competition	Goals
Africa Cup of Nations qualification	12
Friendlies	5
Africa Cup of Nations tournaments	2
FIFA World Cup qualification	4
FIFA Arab Cup	1
Total	24

Scores and results list Algeria's goal tally first, score column indicates score after each Soudani goal.

List of international goals scored by Hillal Soudani
No.	Date	Venue	Cap	Opponent	Score	Result	Competition
1	26 May 2012	Mustapha Tchaker Stadium, Blida, Algeria	3	Niger	3–0	3–0	Friendly
2	2 June 2012	Mustapha Tchaker Stadium, Blida, Algeria	4	Rwanda	2–0	4–0	2014 FIFA World Cup qualification
3	2 June 2012	Mustapha Tchaker Stadium, Blida, Algeria	4	Rwanda	4–0	4–0	2014 FIFA World Cup qualification
4	15 June 2012	Mustapha Tchaker Stadium, Blida, Algeria	6	Gambia	4–1	4–1	2013 Africa Cup of Nations qualification
5	9 September 2012	Stade Mohammed V, Casablanca, Morocco	7	Libya	1–0	1–0	2013 Africa Cup of Nations qualification
6	14 October 2012	Mustapha Tchaker Stadium, Blida, Algeria	8	Libya	1–0	2–0	2013 Africa Cup of Nations qualification
7	30 January 2013	Royal Bafokeng Stadium, Rustenburg, South Africa	12	Ivory Coast	2–0	2–2	2013 Africa Cup of Nations
8	2 June 2013	Mustapha Tchaker Stadium, Blida, Algeria	14	Burkina Faso	1–0	2–0	Friendly
9	10 September 2013	Mustapha Tchaker Stadium, Blida, Algeria	17	Mali	1–0	1–0	2014 FIFA World Cup qualification
10	5 March 2014	Mustapha Tchaker Stadium, Blida, Algeria	20	Slovenia	1–0	2–0	Friendly
11	4 June 2014	Stade de Genève, Geneva, Switzerland	22	Romania	2–1	2–1	Friendly
12	6 September 2014	Addis Ababa Stadium, Addis Ababa, Ethiopia	26	Ethiopia	1–0	2–1	2015 Africa Cup of Nations qualification
13	1 February 2015	Estadio de Malabo, Malabo, Equatorial Guinea	32	Ivory Coast	1–1	1–3	2015 Africa Cup of Nations
14	13 June 2015	Mustapha Tchaker Stadium, Blida, Algeria	33	Seychelles	2–0	4–0	2017 Africa Cup of Nations qualification
15	13 June 2015	Mustapha Tchaker Stadium, Blida, Algeria	33	Seychelles	3–0	4–0	2017 Africa Cup of Nations qualification
16	6 September 2015	Setsoto Stadium, Maseru, Lesotho	34	Lesotho	2–1	3–1	2017 Africa Cup of Nations qualification
17	6 September 2015	Setsoto Stadium, Maseru, Lesotho	34	Lesotho	3–1	3–1	2017 Africa Cup of Nations qualification
18	2 June 2016	Stade Linité, Victoria, Seychelles	37	Seychelles	2–0	2–0	2017 Africa Cup of Nations qualification
19	5 September 2016	Mustapha Tchaker Stadium, Blida, Algeria	38	Lesotho	1–0	6–0	2017 Africa Cup of Nations qualification
20	5 September 2016	Mustapha Tchaker Stadium, Blida, Algeria	38	Lesotho	4–0	6–0	2017 Africa Cup of Nations qualification
21	9 October 2016	Mustapha Tchaker Stadium, Blida, Algeria	39	Cameroon	1–0	1–1	2018 FIFA World Cup qualification
22	6 June 2017	Mustapha Tchaker Stadium, Blida, Algeria	41	Guinea	2–1	2–1	Friendly
23	14 November 2019	Mustapha Tchaker Stadium, Blida, Algeria	50	Zambia	4–0	5–0	2021 Africa Cup of Nations qualification
24	1 December 2021	Ahmed bin Ali Stadium, Al Rayyan, Qatar	53	Sudan	4–0	4–0	2021 FIFA Arab Cup

== Honours ==
ASO Chlef

- Algerian Ligue Professionnelle 1: 2010–11

Vitória Guimarães

- Taça de Portugal: 2013

Dinamo Zagreb

- Croatian First League: 2013–14, 2014–15, 2015–16, 2017–18
- Croatian Cup: 2015, 2016, 2018
- Croatian Super Cup: 2013

Olympiacos

- Super League Greece: 2019–20
- Greek Cup: 2019–20

Algeria

- FIFA Arab Cup: 2021

Individual

- Algerian Ligue Professionnelle 1 Footballer of the Year: 2010–11
- DZFoot d'Or Young Player of the Year: 2008
- DZFoot d'Or: 2013
- Football Oscar Best Prva HNL player: 2018
- Football Oscar Team of the Year: 2014, 2017, 2018
- Prva HNL Player of the Year (Tportal): 2017
- African Nations Championship top scorer: 2011 (3 goals)
- Algerian Ligue Professionnelle 1 top scorer: 2010–11 (18 goals)
- Africa Cup of Nations qualifiers top scorer: 2017 (7 goals)
- Croatian First Football League top scorer: 2017–18 (17 goals)
- Croatian First Football League top assist maker: 2014–15
- Slovenian First League Player of the Month: April 2024, May 2024, March 2025
- Slovenian First League Team of the Season: 2023–24, 2024–25
