= Algerian Footballer of the Year =

Sporting award

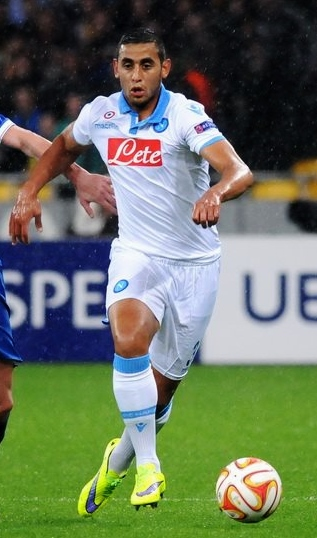
Faouzi Ghoulam won the award in 2017.

The Algerian Footballer of the Year is an annual football award for the best Algerian player presented by El Heddaf-Le Buteur since 2001. The first winner of the award was Olympique de Marseille midfielder Djamel Belmadi. As of 2015, only Karim Ziani, Madjid Bougherra and Riyad Mahrez have won the award on two consecutive occasions . Of the five, only Karim Ziani won his awards playing for two different teams.

The award ceremony featured several distinguished figures from world football who presented the trophy to the winner, including Paolo Maldini, Franck Ribéry, Fabio Cannavaro, Emilio Butragueño, Johan Cruyff, Laurent Blanc, Harald Schumacher and Roberto Carlos.

== Players of the year (2001–2018) ==
Season	Winner	Runner-up	Third place	Fourth place	Fifth place
2018	Baghdad Bounedjah				
2017	Faouzi Ghoulam (225 Points, 24.25%)	Yacine Brahimi (173 Points, 19.03%)	Sofiane Hanni (151 Points, 16.61%)	Baghdad Bounedjah (138 Points, 15.18%)	Abdelmoumene Djabou (81 Points, 8.61%)
2016	Riyad Mahrez				
2015	Riyad Mahrez (29.51%)	Yacine Brahimi (28.84%)	Islam Slimani (17.38%)	Faouzi Ghoulam (11.56%)	Sofiane Feghouli (6.50%)
2014	Yacine Brahimi	Islam Slimani	Sofiane Feghouli	Abdelmoumene Djabou	El Arbi Hillel Soudani
2013	Islam Slimani	Saphir Taïder	Sofiane Feghouli	Yacine Brahimi	Essaid Belkalem
2012	Sofiane Feghouli				
2011	Ryad Boudebouz (545 Points)	El Arbi Hillel Soudani (318 Points)	Djamel Mesbah (306 Points)		
2010	Madjid Bougherra (677 Points)	Abdelmoumene Djabou (322 Points)	Rafik Halliche (317 Points)	Karim Matmour (246 Points)	Hassan Yebda (112 Points)
2009	Madjid Bougherra				
2008	Rafik Saïfi (444 Points)	Lamouri Djediat (432 Points)	Antar Yahia (352 Points)	Samir Zaoui (205 Points)	Chérif Abdeslam (151 Points)
2007	Karim Ziani	Nadir Belhadj	Lazhar Hadj Aïssa		
2006	Karim Ziani (502 Points)	Noureddine Daham (399 Points)	Hamza Yacef (340 Points)		
2005	Billel Dziri				
2004	Moussa Saib (389 Points)	Billel Dziri (213 Points)	Karim Ziani (191 Points)	Hocine Achiou (171 Points)	Antar Yahia (150 Points)
2003	Amar Ammour (616 Points)	Isâad Bourahli (108 Points)	Brahim Hemdani (106 Points)		
2002	Ali Benarbia (168 Points)	Amar Ammour (99 Points)	Farouk Belkaïd (88 Points)	Yazid Mansouri (77 Points)	Yacine Bezzaz (68 Points)
2001	Djamel Belmadi				

=== Winners ===
Player	Wins	Years winning
Karim Ziani	2	2006, 2007
Madjid Bougherra	2	2009, 2010
Riyad Mahrez	2	2015, 2016
Djamel Belmadi	1	2001
Ali Benarbia	1	2002
Amar Ammour	1	2003
Moussa Saib	1	2004
Billel Dziri	1	2005
Rafik Saïfi	1	2008
Ryad Boudebouz	1	2011
Sofiane Feghouli	1	2012
Islam Slimani	1	2013
Yacine Brahimi	1	2014
Faouzi Ghoulam	1	2017
Baghdad Bounedjah	1	2018

=== Winners by country ===
R.	Country	Titles	Years winning
1	France	5	2001, 2006, 2007, 2008, 2011
2	England	3	2002, 2015, 2016
=	Algeria	3	2003, 2004, 2005
4	Scotland	2	2009, 2010
=	Portugal	2	2013, 2014
6	Spain	1	2012
=	Italy	1	2017
=	Qatar	1	2018

=== Winners by club ===
R.	Club	Titles
1	(Algeria) USM Alger	2
=	(France) Olympique de Marseille	2
=	(Scotland) Rangers	2
=	(England) Leicester City	2
=	(France) FC Sochaux	2
