= Rafic =

Rafic is a given name and a surname. Notable people with the name include:

- Rafic Charaf (1932–2003), Lebanese painter
- Rafic Hariri (1944–2005), Prime Minister of Lebanon, 1992–1998 and 2000–2004
- Rafic Nahra (born 1959), Lebanese priest of the Catholic Church
- Mayan Rafic (born 1995), Israeli windsurfer

== See also ==
- Beirut - Rafic Hariri International Airport (IATA: BEY, ICAO: OLBA)
- Rafic Hariri Stadium, multi-use stadium in the Manara district of Beirut, Lebanon
- Rafik
- Rafiq
- Refik
