= Kolić =

Kolić is a Croatian surname. Notable people with the surname include:

- Darko Kolić (born 1971), Serbian football player
- Larry Kolic, American football player
- Refik Kolić (born 1965), Bosnian folk music singer

== See also ==
- Koliq
