= Karim Ziani =

Algerian footballer (born 1982)

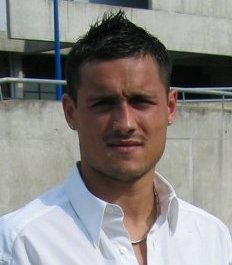
- Ziani in 2007

Personal information
- Full name: Karim Koceila Yanis Ziani
- Date of birth: 17 August 1982 (age 44)
- Place of birth: Sèvres, France
- Height: 1.69 m (5 ft 7 in)
- Position: Midfielder

Youth career
- 1995–1998: RC Paris
- 1998–2001: Troyes

Senior career*
| Years | Team | Apps | (Gls) |
| 2001–2005 | Troyes | 63 | (1) |
| 2004–2005 | → Lorient (loan) | 24 | (1) |
| 2005–2006 | Lorient | 37 | (7) |
| 2006–2007 | Sochaux | 36 | (8) |
| 2007–2009 | Marseille | 49 | (4) |
| 2009–2011 | VfL Wolfsburg | 15 | (0) |
| 2011 | → Kayserispor (loan) | 13 | (0) |
| 2011–2013 | El Jaish | 41 | (1) |
| 2013–2014 | Al-Arabi | 23 | (3) |
| 2014–2015 | Ajman | 3 | (0) |
| 2015 | Al-Fujairah SC | 11 | (0) |
| 2016 | Petrolul Ploiești | 14 | (0) |
| 2016–2019 | Orléans | 78 | (9) |
| Total | | 407 | (34) |

International career
| 2004 | Algeria U23 | 2 | (0) |
| 2003–2011 | Algeria | 62 | (5) |
- * Club domestic league appearances and goals

Karim Koceila Yanis Ziani (Arabic: كريم زياني; born 17 August 1982) is a former professional footballer. He played in different midfield positions but was best known as a playmaker. Born in France, he represented Algeria at international level.

Ziani is considered a national hero by many Algerians as it was his cross that led to the goal that put Algeria into their first World Cup since 1986 at the expense of bitter rivals Egypt. He played at the 2004 and 2010 Africa Cup of Nations, the latter in which Algeria finished fourth and the 2010 FIFA World Cup in South Africa. Overall, he participated in 62 official matches for the Algerian national team and scored five goals.

== Club career ==
Ziani began his football career in 1995 with the junior side of Racing Club de Paris at the age of 13.

=== Troyes ===
In 1998, Ziani was spotted by scouts from Troyes and was subsequently brought into their youth academy. Playing for the youth team there garnered a significant amount of keen admirers interested in him, including the likes of Lens and Nantes. In 2001, having spent three seasons playing with the youth team and because of the level of interest, the president of Troyes offered Ziani a five-year deal, which in turn was his first professional contract. With Ziani agreeing to a five-year deal, he was immediately promoted to the senior squad by Alain Perrin at the age of 17 and was assigned the number 17 shirt. He made his professional debut on 8 December 2001 against SC Bastia coming on as a substitute, replacing David Hamed in the 72nd minute. After making a few substitute appearances, he made his first start on 3 March 2002 in a 1–0 loss to Lille, playing the entire match, adding up to a total of eight in the 2001–02 season. He became a regular in the 2002–03 season as he participated in a total of 24 games. After subsequently spending two seasons playing for Troyes in Ligue 1, the club was relegated to Ligue 2 at the end of the 2002–03 season. Whilst in Ligue 2, during the 2003–04 season, Ziani played 28 games in total and scored his first professional goal against FC Rouen, in the 9th minute with the score ending 3–0. He spent the following season mostly on the bench for Troyes and with interest from other clubs being shown, Troyes had decided to part ways with Ziani. Turkish club Rivaspor had made a bid but could not negotiate a contract with Ziani, as Ziani had put in a condition which Rivaspor rejected. Ziani revealed the condition merely as having Madjid Bougherra have a trial with the club to display his qualities as they had both travelled to Turkey and Ziani would have liked a compatriot with him at the club as he was only 19 at the time. When Rivaspor rejected the condition, both Ziani and Bougherra left Turkey together.

=== Lorient ===
In the summer of 2004, Ziani was loaned out to FC Lorient. In the next two seasons he would become Lorient's top player and would lead them to promotion to Ligue 1. He was voted as the top player in Ligue 2 for the 2005–06 season.

=== Sochaux ===
In the summer of 2006, Ziani signed a three-year deal with FC Sochaux and reunited with his first coach at Troyes Alain Perrin. While at Sochaux he played as they won the 2007 Coupe de France Final. The game finished 2–2 and went to penalties, and he scored his penalty in the shootout as his side emerged victorious.

=== Marseille ===
The following summer, Ziani saw increasing attention from other French clubs, namely Olympique de Marseille. This interest culminated on 29 June 2007, when news broke that Ziani had finalized his move to Marseille for a transfer fee of $11 million. Karim scored his first goal with Marseille in a match against Valenciennes. He became a familiar face in Eric Gerets' starting eleven.

=== VfL Wolfsburg ===
On 7 July 2009, it was announced that Ziani had signed a four-year contract with Bundesliga champions VfL Wolfsburg.

During December 2010 and January 2011, a number of clubs showed interest in signing Ziani, these were Newcastle United, AS Monaco, FC Lorient, VfB Stuttgart, Everton, and Birmingham City. On 14 January 2011, it was reported that Ziani had moved to Turkish high-flyers Kayserispor on an initial six-month loan deal, with an option to sign him permanently at the end of the season.

On 8 July 2011, Wolfsburg and Ziani reached a mutual agreement to terminate his contract.

=== El Jaish ===
On 20 July 2011, Ziani signed a three-year contract with Qatari club El Jaish. On 18 September 2009, Ziani made his Qatar Stars League debut for El Jaish as a starter in a league game against Al Khor. Although he failed to find the net in his first season, he finished the 2011–12 season as the top assistant with 13 assists.

=== Orléans ===
Ziani spent three seasons at Ligue club US Orléans, scoring nine goals in 92 matches.

In summer 2019, Ziani ended his 18-year career at the age of 36.

== International career ==
Ziani had stunned many people in 2003 in his choice to represent Algeria instead of France.

Ziani made his debut for the Algerian national team in 2003 when he was called up by Belgian caretaker Georges Leekens for a friendly against Belgium. He represented Algeria at the 2004 Africa Cup of Nations, as they finished second in their group before losing to Morocco in the quarter-finals. He was also named in that year's Team of the Tournament.

Ziani scored his first goal in a 1–0 win against the Gambia in the 2008 Africa Cup of Nations qualification phase. He then added two more goals to his tally in a 3–0 win against Liberia in the 2010 FIFA World Cup qualifiers as Algeria advanced to the final tournament in South Africa. He also performed well at the 2010 Africa Cup of Nations.

== Style of play ==
Though diminutive in stature, Ziani more than makes up for his lack of physicality with his technique and never-say-die spirit.

== Personal life ==
Ziani was born in Sèvres, France to an Algerian father from Béjaïa and a French mother. Ziani is married and has two children: a girl, Lina and a boy, Kaïs. Ziani has a twin sister by the name of Karima who is married to fellow Algerian international Antar Yahia.

== Career statistics ==
=== Club ===
Appearances and goals by club, season and competition
| Club | Season | League | | | National Cup | | League Cup | | Continental | | Other | | Total | |
| Club | Season | Division | Apps | Goals | Apps | Goals | Apps | Goals | Apps | Goals | Apps | Goals | Apps | Goals |
|---|---|---|---|---|---|---|---|---|---|---|---|---|---|---|
| Troyes | 2001–02 | Ligue 1 | 8 | 0 | 2 | 0 | | | | | – | | 10 | 0 |
| Troyes | 2002–03 | Ligue 1 | 24 | 0 | 1 | 0 | 1 | 0 | | | – | | 26 | 0 |
| Troyes | 2003–04 | Ligue 2 | 28 | 1 | 1 | 0 | 1 | 0 | | | – | | 30 | 1 |
| Troyes | 2004–05 | Ligue 2 | 3 | 0 | | | | | | | – | | 3 | 0 |
| Troyes | Total | | 63 | 1 | 4 | 0 | 2 | 0 | 0 | 0 | 0 | 0 | 69 | 1 |
| Lorient (loan) | 2004–05 | Ligue 2 | 24 | 1 | | | | | | | – | | 24 | 1 |
| Lorient | 2005–06 | Ligue 2 | 37 | 7 | | | 2 | 1 | | | – | | 39 | 8 |
| Sochaux | 2006–07 | Ligue 1 | 36 | 8 | 5 | 0 | 3 | 1 | | | – | | 44 | 9 |
| Marseille | 2007–08 | Ligue 1 | 21 | 1 | 2 | 0 | 2 | 1 | 3 | 0 | – | | 28 | 2 |
| Marseille | 2008–09 | Ligue 1 | 28 | 3 | | | | | 9 | 0 | – | | 37 | 3 |
| Marseille | Total | | 49 | 4 | 2 | 0 | 2 | 1 | 12 | 0 | 0 | 0 | 65 | 5 |
| VfL Wolfsburg | 2009–10 | Bundesliga | 10 | 0 | 2 | 0 | – | | 4 | 0 | – | | 16 | 0 |
| VfL Wolfsburg | 2010–11 | Bundesliga | 5 | 0 | 2 | 0 | – | | 0 | 0 | – | | 7 | 0 |
| VfL Wolfsburg | Total | | 15 | 0 | 4 | 0 | 0 | 0 | 4 | 0 | 0 | 0 | 23 | 0 |
| Kayserispor (loan) | 2010–11 | Süper Lig | 13 | 0 | 0 | 0 | – | | 0 | 0 | – | | 13 | 0 |
| El Jaish | 2011–12 | Qatar Stars League | 22 | 0 | 0 | 0 | – | | 0 | 0 | – | | 22 | 0 |
| El Jaish | 2012–13 | Qatar Stars League | 19 | 1 | 0 | 0 | — | | 7 | 0 | – | | 26 | 1 |
| El Jaish | Total | | 41 | 1 | 0 | 0 | 0 | 0 | 7 | 0 | 0 | 0 | 48 | 1 |
| Al-Arabi | 2013–14 | Qatar Stars League | 23 | 3 | 2 | 1 | — | | 0 | 0 | – | | 25 | 4 |
| Ajman | 2014–15 | UAE Pro-League | 3 | 0 | 0 | 0 | 0 | 0 | 0 | 0 | – | | 3 | 0 |
| Al-Fujairah | 2014–15 | UAE Pro-League | 11 | 0 | 0 | 0 | 0 | 0 | 0 | 0 | – | | 11 | 0 |
| Petrolul Ploiești | 2015–16 | Liga I | 14 | 0 | 0 | 0 | 0 | 0 | 0 | 0 | – | | 14 | 0 |
| Orléans | 2016–17 | Ligue 2 | 32 | 3 | 0 | 0 | 1 | 0 | 0 | 0 | 2 | 0 | 35 | 3 |
| Orléans | 2017–18 | Ligue 2 | 24 | 5 | 0 | 0 | 2 | 1 | 0 | 0 | – | | 26 | 6 |
| Orléans | 2018–19 | Ligue 2 | 22 | 1 | 2 | 1 | 2 | 0 | 0 | 0 | – | | 26 | 2 |
| Orléans | Total | | 78 | 9 | 2 | 1 | 5 | 1 | 0 | 0 | 2 | 0 | 87 | 11 |
| Career total | | | 407 | 34 | 19 | 2 | 14 | 4 | 23 | 0 | 2 | 0 | 465 | 40 |

=== International ===
Appearances and goals by national team and year
| National team | Year | Apps | Goals |
|---|---|---|---|
| Algeria | 2003 | 3 | 0 |
| Algeria | 2004 | 11 | 0 |
| Algeria | 2005 | 6 | 0 |
| Algeria | 2006 | 3 | 1 |
| Algeria | 2007 | 8 | 0 |
| Algeria | 2008 | 8 | 2 |
| Algeria | 2009 | 7 | 1 |
| Algeria | 2010 | 14 | 1 |
| Algeria | 2011 | 2 | 0 |
| Total | | 62 | 5 |

Scores and results list Algeria's goal tally first, score column indicates score after each Ziani goal.

List of international goals scored by Karim Ziani
| No. | Date | Venue | Opponent | Score | Result | Competition |
|---|---|---|---|---|---|---|
| 1 | 7 October 2006 | Stade 5 Juillet 1962, Algiers, Algeria | Gambia | 1–0 | 1–0 | 2008 Africa Cup of Nations qualification |
| 2 | 6 June 2008 | Stade Mustapha Tchaker, Blida, Algeria | Liberia | 2–0 | 3–0 | 2010 FIFA World Cup qualification (CAF) |
| 3 | 6 June 2008 | Stade Mustapha Tchaker, Blida, Algeria | Liberia | 3–0 | 3–0 | 2010 FIFA World Cup qualification (CAF) |
| 4 | 11 October 2009 | Stade Mustapha Tchaker, Blida, Algeria | Rwanda | 3–1 | 3–1 | 2010 FIFA World Cup qualification (CAF) |
| 5 | 5 June 2010 | Playmobil-Stadion, Fürth, Germany | United Arab Emirates | 1–0 | 1–0 | Friendly |

== Honours ==
Sochaux

- Coupe de France: 2007

VfL Wolfsburg

- DFL-Supercup: runners-up 2009

El Jaish

- Qatari Stars Cup: 2013

Algeria

- Africa Cup of Nations fourth place: 2010

Individual

- Africa Cup of Nations Team of the Tournament: 2004
- DZFoot d'Or: 2004, 2005, 2006
- Ligue 2 Player of the Year: 2006 (FC Lorient)
- Ligue 2 Team of the Year: 2005–06 (FC Lorient)
- Algerian Footballer of the Year: 2006, 2007
