= DZFoot d'Or =

Football award

The DZFoot d'Or is a football award, created in 2000 by the Algerian football website DZFoot.com, the leading source of Algerian football news. The award is given annually to the Algerian player considered to have performed the best over the previous year.

== DZFoot d'Or winners ==
Year	Player	Club
2000	Djamel Belmadi	(France) Marseille
2001	Djamel Belmadi	(France) Marseille
2002	Farouk Belkaid	(Algeria) JS Kabylie
2003	Moussa Saïb	(Algeria) JS Kabylie
2004	Karim Ziani	(France) Lorient
2005	Karim Ziani	(France) Lorient
2006	Karim Ziani	(France) Sochaux
2007	Rafik Saïfi	(France) Lorient
2008	Rafik Saïfi	(France) Lorient
2009	Madjid Bougherra	(Scotland) Rangers
2010	Madjid Bougherra	(Scotland) Rangers
2011	Ryad Boudebouz	(France) Sochaux
2012	Sofiane Feghouli	(Spain) Valencia
2013	El Arabi Hillel Soudani	(Croatia) Dinamo Zagreb
2014	Yacine Brahimi	(Portugal) Porto
2019	Ryad Karim Mahrez	(England) Manchester City
