= Sofiane Feghouli =

Algerian footballer (born 1989)

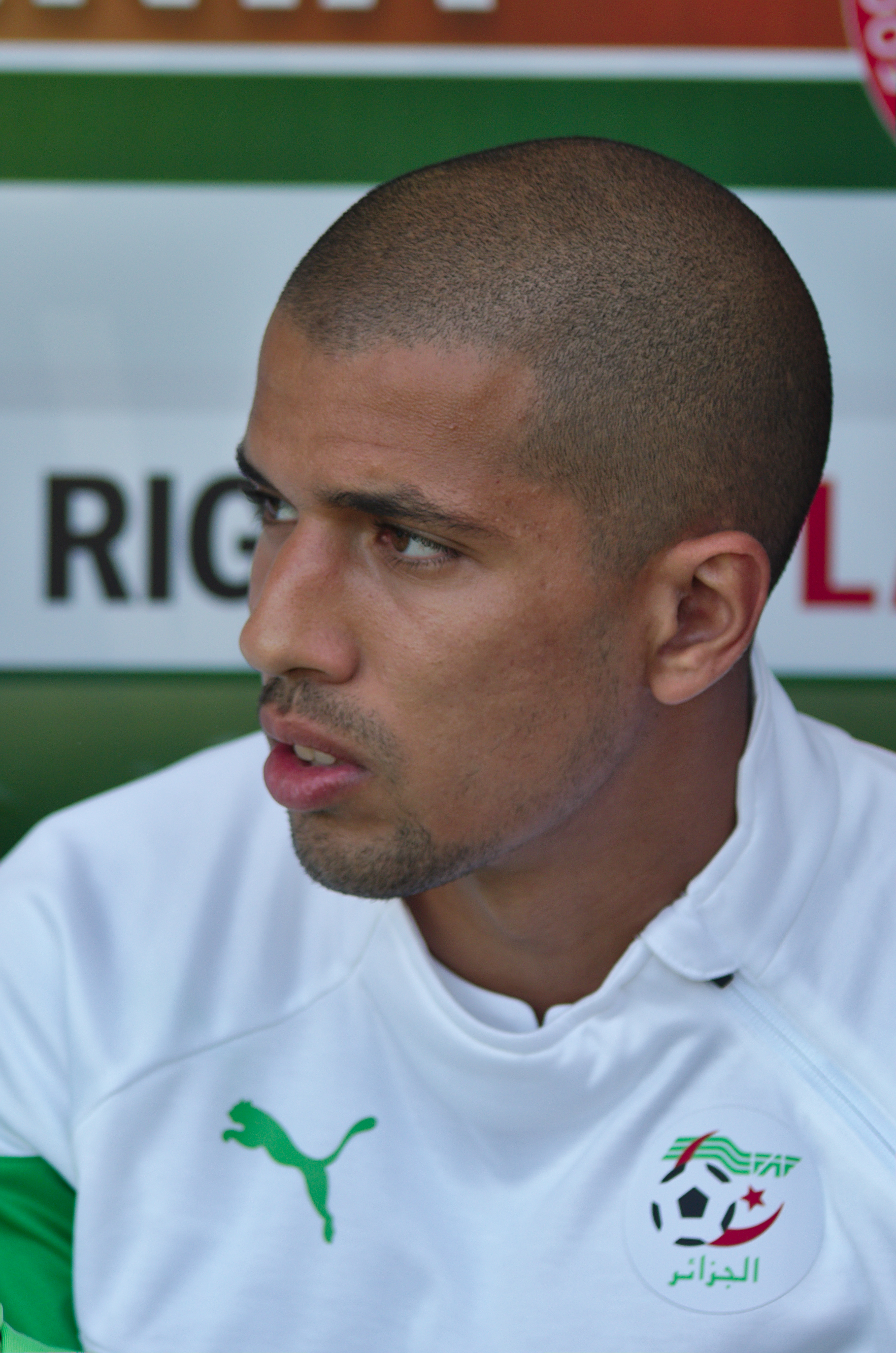
- Feghouli with Algeria in 2014

Personal information
- Full name: Sofiane Feghouli
- Date of birth: 26 December 1989 (age 36)
- Place of birth: Levallois-Perret, France
- Height: 1.77 m (5 ft 10 in)
- Position: Attacking midfielder

Youth career
- 1998–2003: Red Star Paris
- 2003–2004: Paris FC
- 2004–2007: Grenoble

Senior career*
Years	Team	Apps	(Gls)
2007–2010	Grenoble	60	(3)
2010–2016	Valencia	146	(20)
2011	→ Almería (loan)	9	(2)
2016–2017	West Ham United	21	(3)
2017–2022	Galatasaray	125	(25)
2023–2024	Fatih Karagümrük	34	(2)
2025	Amanat Baghdad	4	(0)

International career
2006–2007	France U18	2	(0)
2008–2010	France U21	3	(0)
2012–2024	Algeria	83	(19)
Medal record
Men's football
Representing Algeria
Africa Cup of Nations
Winner	2019 Egypt
- * Club domestic league appearances and goals as of 30 October 2025

Sofiane Feghouli (Arabic: سفيان فيغولي; born 26 December 1989) is a professional footballer. He mainly operates as a winger, but can also play as an attacking midfielder.

Feghouli made his senior international debut for Algeria in February 2012. He represented Algeria at the 2013, 2015, 2019 and 2021 Africa Cup of Nations (winning the 2019 tournament), as well as the 2014 FIFA World Cup, where he scored Algeria's first goal in the competition since 1986. He earned 83 caps during his career with the national team, scoring 19 goals.

== Early life ==
Feghouli was born in Levallois-Perret to Algerian parents. His father is from Tiaret, while his mother is from Ghazaouet. He has 4 brothers.

== Club career ==
=== Grenoble ===
Feghouli began his career with Grenoble, after French team Paris Saint-Germain decided not to sign him after a trial. For the latter portion of the 2006–2007 season, he was promoted to the first-team squad and given the number 33 shirt. He made his highly anticipated debut, at the age of 17, for the club on 27 April 2007 in a Ligue 2 match against Reims, appearing as a substitute. Grenoble won the match 1–0. He made two more appearances that season, including his first start on the final match day of the season against Montpellier on 25 May 2007. Montpellier won the match 1–0 with Feghouli playing 56 minutes before being subbed out. On 31 May 2007, he signed his first professional contract with Grenoble, keeping him with the side until 2010.

The following season, he was handed the number 8 shirt and, despite being 17 years of age, was given a more important role in the first-team squad. Despite having the pressure of being labelled the "new Zidane", his contribution to the squad was successful, appearing in 27 matches and scoring three goals, helping Grenoble achieve promotion to Ligue 1. His first career goal came on 18 January 2008 in a 4–3 away victory against Reims, the club he faced on his debut.

Feghouli returned for the 2009–10 season, making his debut on 29 August 2009 in a 1–0 defeat to Rhône-Alpes rivals Saint-Étienne. After appearing in five more matches, it was discovered by Grenoble officials that Feghouli had torn the meniscus in his right knee. The knee was successfully operated on in October. Following the surgery, Grenoble officials, most notably CEO Pierre Wantiez, were extremely critical of the player. Wantiez questioned Feghouli's long delay in returning to the team and the player's motives regarding a transfer as Feghouli would be out of contract in the summer and was already talking to several clubs, most notably Spanish club Valencia. Wantiez attributed Feghouli's recent moves to "bad advice" from the player's agent.

=== Valencia ===
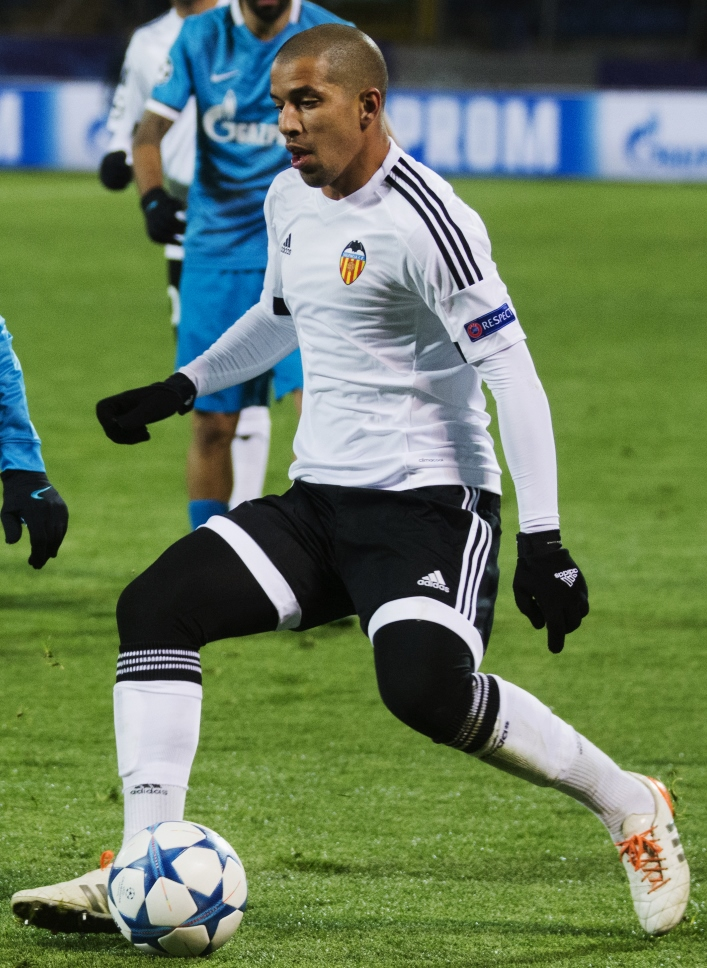
Feghouli playing for Valencia CF in 2015

On 20 May 2010, Feghouli signed a four-year deal with Valencia CF. He made his La Liga debut on 25 September, replacing Juan Mata in a 2–0 win against Sporting de Gijón.

On 28 January 2011, after appearing sparingly for the Valencian side, Feghouli was loaned to fellow league team UD Almería, until June. He appeared regularly for the Andalusians, however they were relegated at the end of the season.

After returning from Almería, and profiting from Mata and Vicente's departures, Feghouli became a starter, and scored his first goals for Los Che on 29 October 2011, netting a brace in a 3–1 home win against Getafe CF. His performances for Valencia in 2012 earned him two Algerian player of the year awards, Le Buteur's Algerian Ballon d'Or and the DZFoot d'Or.

On 11 April 2016, Feghouli was suspended by the club amid reports he refused to take part in a warm-down after the 2–1 home win over Sevilla the day before. He had also reportedly missed training a few days earlier.

He ended his Valencia career with 202 appearances, scoring 31 times and providing 40 assists.

=== West Ham United ===
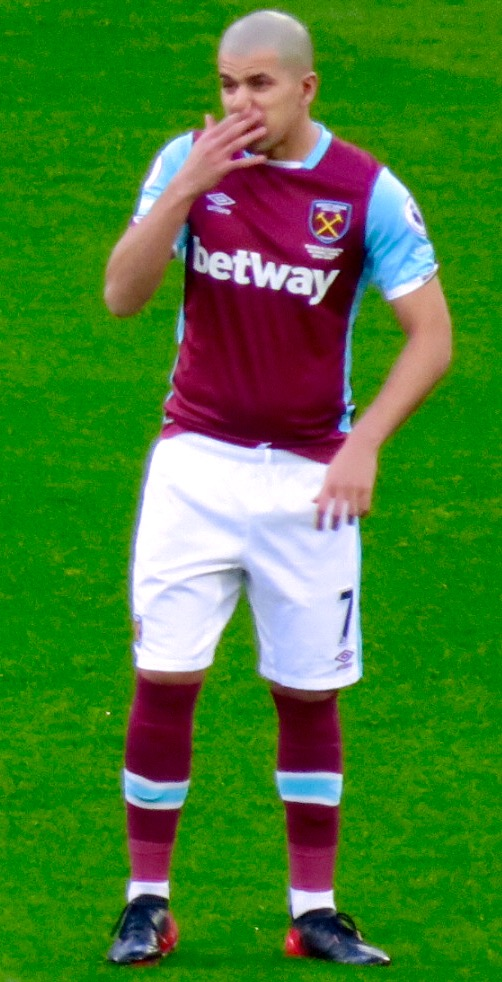
Feghouli with West Ham United in 2017

On 14 June 2016, it was announced that Feghouli would be joining West Ham United on 1 July 2016 on a three-year contract. He made his West Ham debut on 28 July in a 2–1 away defeat to NK Domžale in the Third Qualifying Round of the Europa League. He scored his first competitive goal for West Ham the following week in the return fixture against Domžale, West Ham's first game at the London Stadium in which West Ham won 3–0, progressing to the UEFA Europa League play-offs. Feghouli made his first Premier League start in West Ham's first game of 2017, receiving a harsh red card after 15 minutes for a challenge on Manchester United defender Phil Jones in a 2–0 home defeat. After an appeal against the card by West Ham, it was rescinded on 4 January.

=== Galatasaray ===
In August 2017, Feghouli signed a five-year contract with Galatasaray. Galatasaray paid West Ham a €4.25 million transfer fee.

=== Fatih Karagümrük ===
On 30 November 2022, Feghouli joined Fatih Karagümrük on a one-and-a-half-year contract. He only became available for the team's official matches starting January 2023.

=== Amanat Baghdad ===
On 5 August 2025, Feghouli joined Iraq Stars League club Amanat Baghdad.

== International career ==
=== France ===
Feghouli was eligible for both Algeria and France. Feghouli had stated his preference was to play for France and appeared in several France youth squads. On 12 November 2008, national team manager Raymond Domenech shortlisted the player for his pre-selection squad ahead of a friendly against Uruguay. Despite this, Algeria national team manager Rabah Saadane contacted Feghouli by telephone in an attempt to get the player to play for Algeria in the team's 19 November friendly against Mali. Team captain Yazid Mansouri also contacted the player.

=== Algeria ===
On 25 May 2011, it was reported that, whilst on loan at Almeria, Feghouli met with the President of the Algerian Football Federation Mohamed Raouraoua. Feghouli agreed to play for Algeria and was Invited to a training camp being held in Spain for the match against Morocco. He was unable to attend the session, but was touched by the gesture, agreeing to be available for the Tanzania match instead.

On 23 October 2011, the Algerian Football Federation announced that FIFA officially accepted Feghouli's request to switch allegiances from France to Algeria, and that he was eligible to represent Algeria in international competition as of that date. Two days later, on 25 October, Feghouli was called up by Algeria coach Vahid Halilhodžić for a pair of friendlies against Tunisia and Cameroon in November.

On 29 February 2012, Feghouli made his debut for the Algerian national team in a 2–1 Africa Cup of Nations qualifying win against Gambia, scoring the winning goal. During qualification for the 2014 FIFA World Cup, he scored three goals in seven appearances for Les Fennecs.

In the team's opening match of the 2014 World Cup, a 2–1 defeat to Belgium in Belo Horizonte, Feghouli scored with a penalty kick – Algeria's first World Cup goal in 28 years. He was surprisingly omitted from the 2017 African Cup Of Nations squad.

In December 2023, he was named in Algeria's squad for the 2023 Africa Cup of Nations.

== Career statistics ==
=== Club ===
As of match played 23 January 2022

Appearances and goals by club, season and competition
Club	Season	League			National cup (Note: Includes Coupe de France, Copa del Rey, FA Cup, Turkish Cup)		League cup (Note: Includes Coupe de la Ligue, EFL Cup)		Europe		Other		Total	
Club	Season	Division	Apps	Goals	Apps	Goals	Apps	Goals	Apps	Goals	Apps	Goals	Apps	Goals
Grenoble	2006–07	Ligue 2	3	0	0	0	0	0	—		—		3	0
Grenoble	2007–08	Ligue 2	26	3	1	0	0	0	—		—		27	3
Grenoble	2008–09	Ligue 2	26	0	2	0	0	0	—		—		28	0
Grenoble	2009–10	Ligue 1	5	0	0	0	1	0	—		—		6	0
Grenoble	Total		60	3	3	0	1	0	—		—		64	3
Valencia	2010–11	La Liga	3	0	1	1	—		1 (Note: Appearance(s) in UEFA Champions League)	0	—		5	1
Valencia	2011–12	La Liga	30	6	6	0	—		13 (Note: Seven appearances in UEFA Champions League, six appearances in UEFA Europa League)	0	—		49	6
Valencia	2012–13	La Liga	27	3	2	0	—		8	3	—		37	6
Valencia	2013–14	La Liga	32	4	3	0	—		10 (Note: Appearances in UEFA Europa League)	3	—		45	7
Valencia	2014–15	La Liga	33	6	0	0	—		—		—		33	6
Valencia	2015–16	La Liga	21	1	2	0	—		10 (Note: Seven appearances and three goals in UEFA Champions League, three appearances and one goal in UEFA Europa League)	4	—		33	5
Valencia	Total		146	20	14	1	—		42	10	—		202	31
Almería (loan)	2010–11	La Liga	9	2	1	0	—		—		—		10	2
West Ham United	2016–17	Premier League	21	3	1	0	3	0	2	1	—		27	4
Galatasaray	2017–18	Süper Lig	27	6	4	1	—		0	0	—		31	7
Galatasaray	2018–19	Süper Lig	29	9	5	3	—		5 (Note: Three appearances and one goal in UEFA Champions League, two appearances in UEFA Europa League)	1	1 (Note: Appearance in Turkish Super Cup)	0	40	13
Galatasaray	2019–20	Süper Lig	27	6	3	1	—		5	0	1	0	36	7
Galatasaray	2020–21	Süper Lig	22	2	0	0	—		3	0	—		25	2
Galatasaray	2021–22	Süper Lig	16	2	0	0	—		8 (Note: One appearance in UEFA Champions League, seven appearances and three goals in UEFA Europa League)	3	—		24	5
Galatasaray	Total		121	25	12	5	—		21	4	2	0	156	34
Career total			357	53	31	6	4	0	66	15	2	0	458	74

=== International ===
Appearances and goals by national team and year
National team	Year	Apps	Goals
Algeria	2012	8	2
Algeria	2013	9	3
Algeria	2014	12	2
Algeria	2015	8	2
Algeria	2016	5	2
Algeria	2017	3	0
Algeria	2018	4	0
Algeria	2019	13	1
Algeria	2020	3	1
Algeria	2021	8	6
Algeria	2022	3	0
Algeria	2023	4	0
Algeria	2024	2	0
Total		82	19

Scores and results list Algeria's goal tally first, score column indicates score after each Feghouli goal.

List of international goals scored by Sofiane Feghouli
No.	Date	Venue	Opponent	Score	Result	Competition
1	29 February 2012	Independence Stadium, Bakau, Gambia	Gambia	2–1	2–1	2013 Africa Cup of Nations qualification
2	2 June 2012	Mustapha Tchaker Stadium, Blida, Algeria	Rwanda	1–0	4–0	2014 FIFA World Cup qualification
3	30 January 2013	Royal Bafokeng Stadium, Phokeng, South Africa	Ivory Coast	1–0	2–2	2013 Africa Cup of Nations
4	23 March 2013	Mustapha Tchaker Stadium, Blida, Algeria	Benin	1–0	3–1	2014 FIFA World Cup qualification
5	12 October 2013	Stade du 4 Août, Ouagadougou, Burkina Faso	Burkina Faso	1–1	2–3	2014 FIFA World Cup qualification
6	7 June 2014	Estádio Mineirão, Belo Horizonte, Brazil	Belgium	1–0	1–2	2014 FIFA World Cup
7	15 November 2014	Mustapha Tchaker Stadium, Blida, Algeria	Ethiopia	1–1	3–1	2015 Africa Cup of Nations qualification
8	30 March 2015	Suheim Bin Hamad Stadium, Doha, Qatar	Oman	2–0	4–1	Friendly
9	30 March 2015	Suheim Bin Hamad Stadium, Doha, Qatar	Oman	3–0	4–1	Friendly
10	25 March 2016	Mustapha Tchaker Stadium, Blida, Algeria	Ethiopia	1–0	7–1	2017 Africa Cup of Nations qualification
11	25 March 2016	Mustapha Tchaker Stadium, Blida, Algeria	Ethiopia	3–0	7–1	2017 Africa Cup of Nations qualification
12	11 July 2019	Suez Stadium, Suez, Egypt	Ivory Coast	1–0	1–1 (a.e.t.)	2019 Africa Cup of Nations
13	12 November 2020	Stade du 5 Juillet, Algiers, Algeria	Zimbabwe	2–0	3–1	2021 Africa Cup of Nations qualification
14	29 March 2021	Mustapha Tchaker Stadium, Blida, Algeria	Botswana	2–0	5–0	2021 Africa Cup of Nations qualification
15	3 June 2021	Mustapha Tchaker Stadium, Blida, Algeria	Mauritania	1–0	4–1	Friendly
16	3 June 2021	Mustapha Tchaker Stadium, Blida, Algeria	Mauritania	2–1	4–1	Friendly
17	7 September 2021	Stade de Marrakech, Marrakesh, Morocco	Burkina Faso	1–0	1–1	2022 FIFA World Cup qualification
18	12 November 2021	Cairo International Stadium, Cairo, Egypt	Djibouti	3–0	4–0	2022 FIFA World Cup qualification
19	16 November 2021	Mustapha Tchaker Stadium, Blida, Algeria	Burkina Faso	2–1	2–2	2022 FIFA World Cup qualification

== Honours ==
Galatasaray

- Süper Lig: 2017–18, 2018–19
- Turkish Cup: 2018–19
- Turkish Super Cup: 2019

Algeria

- Africa Cup of Nations: 2019

Individual

- DZFoot d'Or: 2012
- Algerian Footballer of the Year: 2012
- LFP Awards African Player of the Season: 2014–15
