= Rafik =

Given name

Rafik is the given name of:

- Rafik Al-Hariri (1944–2005), business tycoon, former Prime Minister of Lebanon
- Rafik Bouderbal (born 1987), French-born Algerian player currently playing for ES Sétif in the Algerian Championnat National
- Rafik Deghiche (born 1983), Algeria) Algerian football player currently playing as a forward for USM Alger in the Algerian league
- Rafik Djebbour (born 1984), French-born Algerian football player currently playing as a striker for AEK Athens in the Greek Super League
- Rafik Haj Yahia (1949–2000), Israeli Arab politician, member of the Knesset for the Labor Party and One Nation
- Rafik Halliche (born 1986), Algerian footballer who currently plays for C.D. Nacional in the Portuguese first division
- Rafik Kamalov, popular imam in Kyrgyzstan who was shot and killed 7 August 2006, in Osh, by Kyrgyz special forces
- Rafik Khachatryan (1937–1993), Armenian sculptor
- Rafik Khalifa (born 1966), Algerian businessman living in London
- Rafik Saïfi (born 1975), Algerian professional football player who is currently playing for FC Istres
- Rafik Schami (born 1946), Syrian-German author, storyteller and critic

It may also refer to:

- Abdessamad Rafik (born 1982), Moroccan football player who plays for Al-Wahda
- Vlado Goreski, Macedonian artist using the stage name Rafik

== See also ==
- Rafik Hariri University Hospital, formerly known as Beirut Governmental University Hospital (BGUH)
- Rafik Sorman, Libyan football club based in Sorman, Libya
- Rafik Sorman Stadium, multi-purpose stadium in Sorman, Libya
