= Riyad Mahrez =

Algeria international footballer (born 1991)

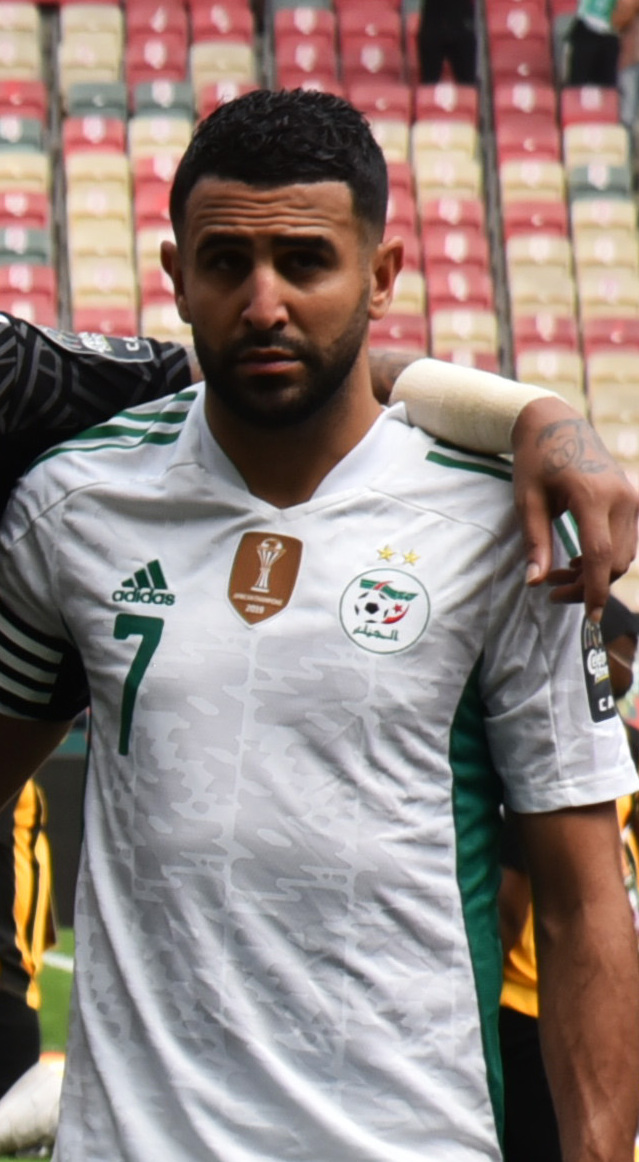
- Mahrez with Algeria in 2021

Personal information
- Full name: Riyad Karim Mahrez
- Date of birth: 21 February 1991 (age 35)
- Place of birth: Clichy, France
- Height: 1.79 m (5 ft 10 in)
- Position: Right winger

Team information
- Current team: Al-Shamal
- Number: 26

Youth career
- 2004–2009: AAS Sarcelles

Senior career*
Years	Team	Apps	(Gls)
2009–2010	Quimper	27	(1)
2010–2013	Le Havre II	60	(24)
2011–2014	Le Havre	60	(6)
2014–2018	Leicester City	158	(42)
2018–2023	Manchester City	145	(43)
2023–2026	Al-Ahli	90	(23)
2026–	Al-Shamal	4	(3)

International career
2014–2026	Algeria	120	(40)
Medal record
Men's football
Representing Algeria
Africa Cup of Nations
Winner	2019 Egypt
- * Club domestic league appearances and goals as of 7 November 2026

Riyad Karim Mahrez (born 21 February 1991) is a professional footballer who plays as a right winger for Qatar Stars League side Al-Shamal. Born in France, he represented the Algeria national team. He is regarded as one of the best African players of all time.

Mahrez began his career as a youth player for French club AAS Sarcelles. He turned professional in 2009 with Quimper, where he played for only one season before moving to Le Havre, spending a total of three years with them, initially playing for their reserve team and then becoming a first-team regular. In January 2014, Mahrez signed for English side Leicester City, helping them win the Championship and promotion to the Premier League at the end of his first season. In the 2015–16 season, he was the Algerian Footballer of the Year, the PFA Players' Player of the Year, and was a member of the Premier League PFA Team of the Year as he helped Leicester City win the Premier League. Mahrez signed for Manchester City in 2018, winning the Premier League, FA Cup and EFL Cup in his first season. He went on to win a further three league titles, one FA Cup, two EFL Cups and a UEFA Champions League in 2022–23 as part of a continental treble whilst at City. In July 2023, he joined Saudi side Al-Ahli, winning two AFC Champions League Elite titles and the Saudi Super Cup.

Mahrez made his international debut for Algeria in 2014, representing the nation at the FIFA World Cup in 2014 and 2026 as well as the Africa Cup of Nations in 2015, 2017, 2019, 2021, 2023 and 2025, winning the 2019 tournament. In 2016, he was named CAF's African Footballer of the Year.

== Early life ==
Mahrez was born in Clichy, a commune in the northwestern suburbs of Paris, to an Algerian father and a Moroccan mother of Algerian and Moroccan descent. His father Ahmed was from Beni Snous, Tlemcen Province. Growing up, Mahrez would regularly spend his holidays in Algeria. His childhood friends included fellow footballers, such as Wissam Ben Yedder.

Mahrez's father had played football in Algeria. When Mahrez was fifteen, his father died of a heart attack. He reflected that "I don't know if I started to be more serious but after the death of my dad things started to go for me. Maybe in my head, I wanted it more".

== Club career ==
=== Early career ===
Although often overlooked by teams due to his slender build, Mahrez developed ball skills that brought him attention.

He joined AAS Sarcelles in 2004. He had a two-month trial at Scottish club St Mirren, but left due to the cold weather.

In 2009, Mahrez joined CFA side Quimper from AAS Sarcelles, making 22 appearances and scoring 2 goals in his first season with the club. While playing for Quimper, he lived with Mathias Pogba.

He joined Le Havre in 2010, turning down offers from leading French teams Paris Saint-Germain and Marseille to join them, being enticed by Le Havre's youth system. He initially played for their reserve team, Le Havre II, before going on to play 60 times and score 6 goals for the first team in the French Ligue 2 from 2011 until leaving in January 2014. He criticised Ligue 2 for what he saw as reliance on defence and teams aiming for a goalless draw in every match.

=== Leicester City ===
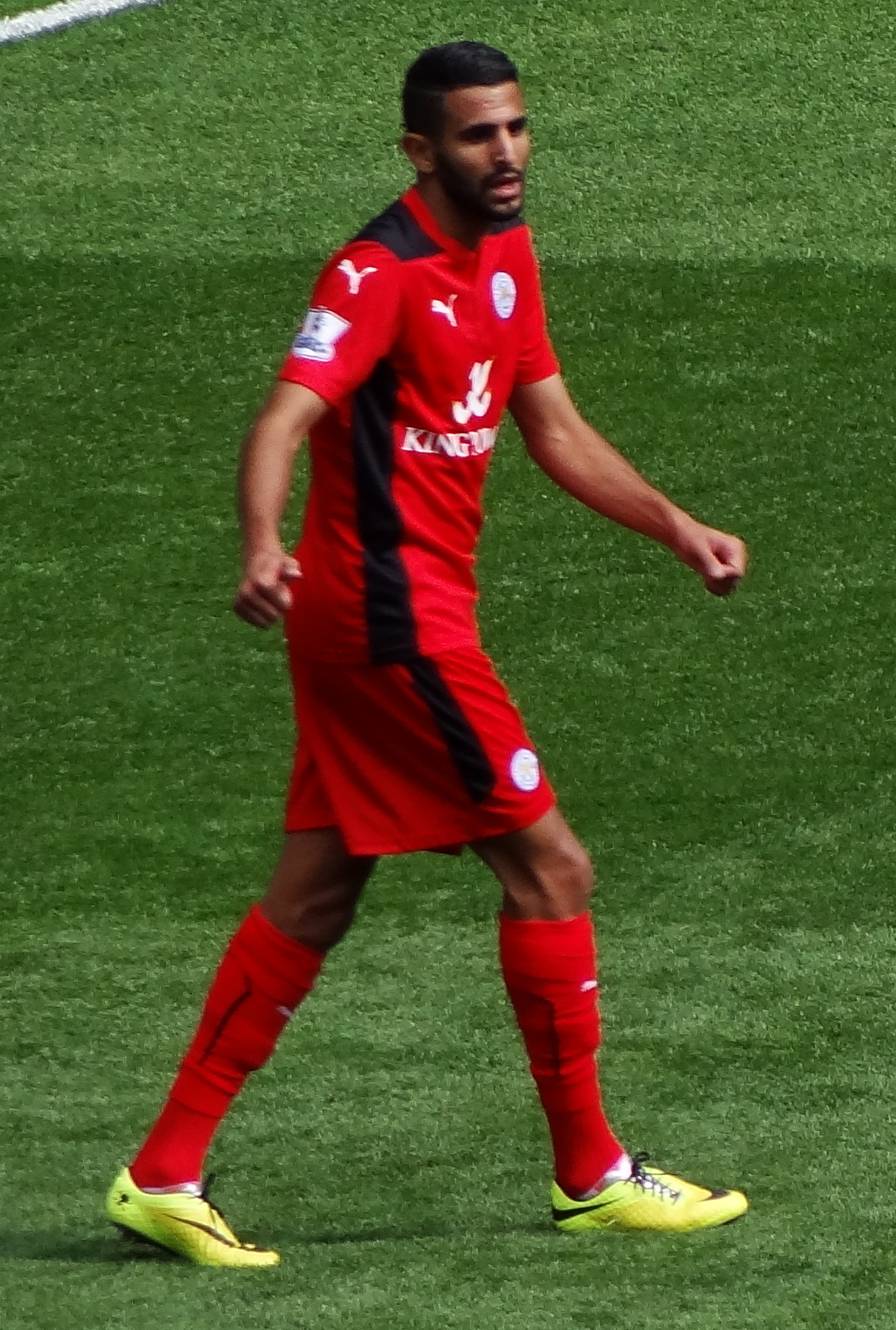
Mahrez playing for Leicester City in 2014

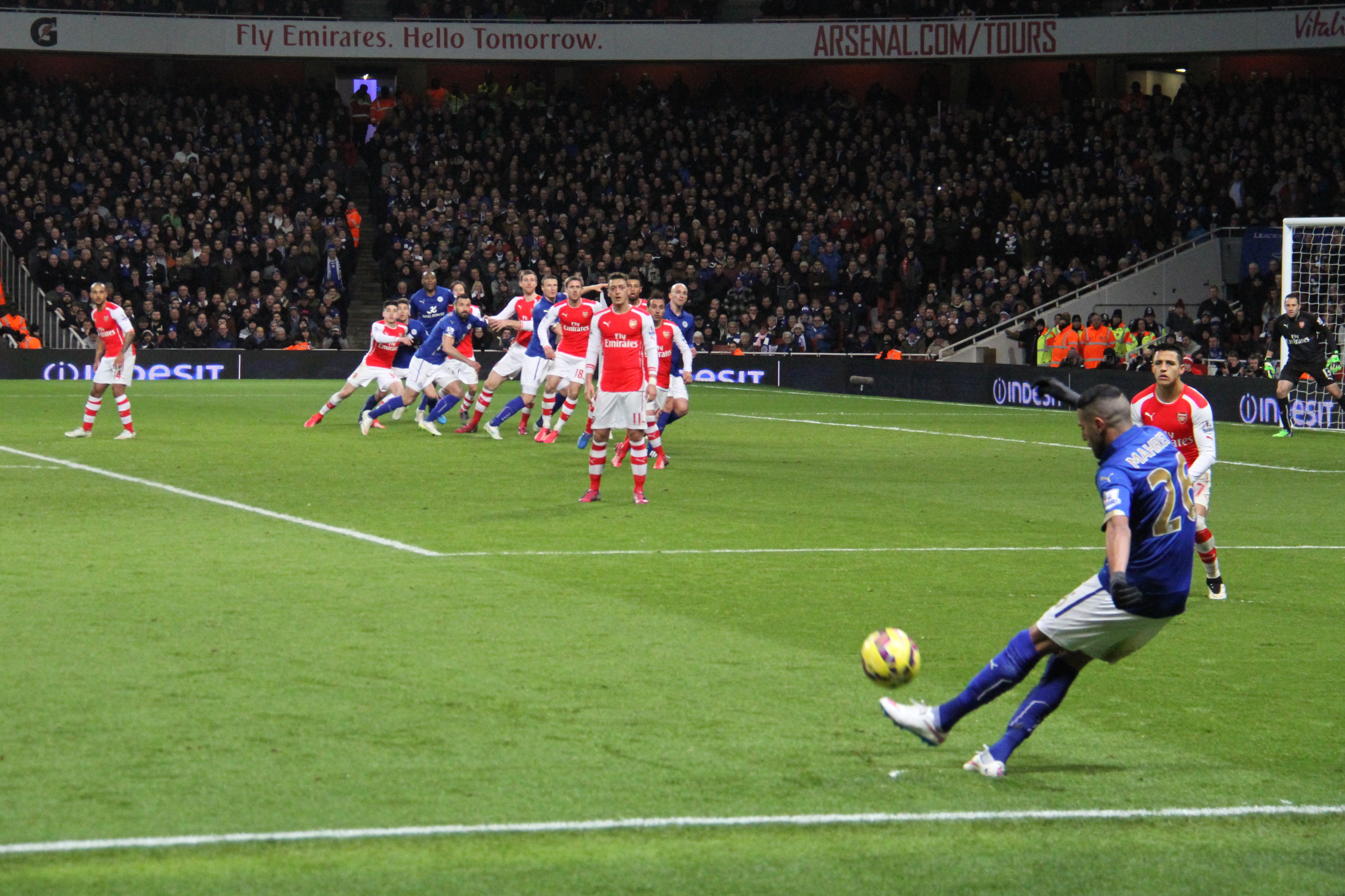
Mahrez taking a free kick away against Arsenal in February 2015.

==== 2013–14 season ====
While Mahrez was playing for Le Havre, English Championship club Leicester City's scout Steve Walsh was monitoring teammate Ryan Mendes, but was instead impressed by Mahrez. Mahrez had never heard of Leicester, whom he initially presumed to be a rugby club. On 11 January 2014, he was signed by Leicester City on a three-and-a-half-year contract for around £450,000. His friends and family were initially sceptical of a move to English football due to its physical nature, believing that his style of play would be more suited to Spain.

Mahrez made his debut on 25 January 2014, coming on in the 79th minute as a substitute replacing fellow winger Lloyd Dyer, in the 2–0 win against Middlesbrough. After making four substitute appearances for Leicester, including scoring his first goal for the club, an 82nd-minute equaliser against local rivals Nottingham Forest, manager Nigel Pearson announced in February 2014 that he thought Mahrez was ready to start games. Leicester ended the season as winners of the Championship, returning to the Premier League for the first time in ten years.

==== 2014–15 season ====
Mahrez made his Premier League debut on 16 August 2014, and scored his first goal in the division on 4 October 2014 in a 2–2 draw with Burnley. Mahrez was part of the Leicester team that won seven of its final nine matches of the season to avoid relegation to the Football League. He scored both goals in a 2–0 defeat of Southampton on 9 May and ended the season with four goals and three assists from 30 appearances.

==== 2015–16 season ====
He signed a new four-year contract with Leicester in August 2015. On 8 August 2015, Mahrez scored two goals in the season opener against Sunderland in a 4–2 home win. He was later described as the club's "match winner" by captain Wes Morgan, following "superb form" which saw him score four goals in the first three games of the season.

After scoring four goals in the opening four games of the 2015–16 season, Mahrez was nominated for the Premier League Player of the Month award. By 3 November 2015, he had scored seven goals in 10 Premier League games. On 5 December, Mahrez scored a hat-trick as Leicester defeated Swansea City 3–0 to go top of the Premier League, putting him on ten league goals for the season and making him the first Algerian to score a Premier League hat-trick. Mahrez and his midfield partners Marc Albrighton, N'Golo Kanté and Danny Drinkwater received plaudits for their part in Leicester's early season run of form, and manager Claudio Ranieri described Mahrez and forward Jamie Vardy as "priceless" ahead of the January transfer window.

In January 2016, Mahrez's transfer value was said to have risen from £4.5 million to £30.1 million, ranking him among the top 50 most valuable players in Europe. In the same year, Mahrez's popularity in his homeland led Leicester to have over almost three times as many Facebook fans in Algeria than in the UK. The barbershop in Sarcelles that he frequented from his childhood became a destination for fans from as far as Belgium, desiring the same haircut.

Mahrez was one of four Leicester players named in the PFA Team of the Year in April 2016, and later that month he won the PFA Players' Player of the Year award. He was the first African to earn the accolade. When Leicester finished the season as champions, Mahrez became the first Algerian to win a Premier League medal.

==== 2016–17 season ====
I am fiercely ambitious and feel now is the time to move on to a new experience. I've always enjoyed a good relationship with the chairman and everyone at the club, and I hope I have been able to repay the faith shown to me by my performances and commitment on the pitch during my time here.

— Mahrez speaking to The Guardian about his desire to leave Leicester City.

He signed a new four-year contract with Leicester in August 2016. He was nominated for the Ballon d'Or in October 2016, finishing seventh. He won the BBC African Footballer of the Year award in December 2016. Mahrez did not have a great season, especially with the decline in the level of Leicester, but helped the team get to the quarter-finals of the Champions League for the first time, scoring four goals and two assists. On 6 May, Mahrez played his 100th Premier League game for Leicester, against Watford, scoring in the process.

==== 2017–18 season ====
At the end of the 2016–17 season, Mahrez announced that he wished to leave the club. Following the announcement, Arsenal manager Arsène Wenger stated his interest in signing Mahrez, and Italian side Roma had a bid for Mahrez rejected in July 2017. In August 2017 he spoke of his "focus" despite his uncertain future at the club. The Algerian Football Federation reported on 31 August, the last day of the transfer window, that it had allowed him to leave the national team and travel quickly to Europe in order to complete his transfer to an interested club; this transfer did not materialise. In January 2018 he again asked for a transfer away from the club. After a move to Manchester City fell through, Mahrez stopped attending training at Leicester. His behaviour was criticised by commentator and former player Chris Sutton. Mahrez was critical about the "untrue assumptions" about his absence from the team, and later thanked his teammates for their support.

=== Manchester City ===
==== 2018–19 season ====
On 10 July 2018, Manchester City confirmed the signing of Mahrez on a five-year contract. The transfer fee of £60m made Mahrez the most expensive African footballer, and also Manchester City's most expensive signing and a record transfer fee received by Leicester City. He stated he wanted to win the Champions League with the club. He made his debut as a starter on 5 August, as City defeated Chelsea 2–0 to win the 2018 FA Community Shield at Wembley Stadium. On 22 September 2018, coming on as a substitute in the 61st minute Mahrez scored a brace for the Citizens against Cardiff City, The first goal was his first with Manchester City.

On 29 October 2018, Mahrez scored the only goal for Manchester City in a 1–0 away victory against Tottenham Hotspur. He dedicated the goal to Vichai Srivaddhanaprabha, the former owner of his previous club Leicester City, who had recently died in a helicopter crash. On 24 February 2019, Mahrez won his second title with Manchester City by winning the EFL Cup against Chelsea, also won the best player of the EFL Cup although he did not participate in the final.

At the end of his first season with Manchester City, despite having "limited playing time" (including just 14 league starts), Mahrez won the Premier League title for the second time, and his first with Manchester City, becoming the second African player to win the title with two different clubs after Kolo Touré. Mahrez said he would not leave City despite his lack of game time, claiming that he knew his first season would be difficult and he had come to a stable team with good players but he trusted his potential. A week after in the FA Cup final, he achieved his fourth title of the season after beating Watford 6–0 becoming the first African player to complete an English domestic treble, as he earlier won the 2018–19 EFL Cup and the 2018–19 Premier League.

==== 2019–20 season ====
In August 2019, Mahrez missed the 2019 FA Community Shield over concerns about medicine he had been given by the Algerian national team. The Algerian FA described it as a "non-event". Mahrez later started in Manchester City's 5–0 opening day away win against West Ham United, being involved in all 5 of his side's goals, providing two assists for hat-trick scorer Raheem Sterling and winning a penalty for Sergio Agüero to eventually score after a retake.

==== 2020–21 season ====
On 28 November 2020, Mahrez scored his first hat-trick for City in a 5–0 home league win over Burnley. On 4 May 2021, Mahrez scored both goals in a 2–0 home win over Paris Saint-Germain in the second leg of the Champions League semi-finals, and by scoring via a direct free kick in a 2–1 away win a week earlier, he led City through to the first European Cup final in the club's history. However, his team lost 1–0 to Chelsea in the final, with his half-volley from the edge of the penalty area sailing just over the crossbar in the final minute of stoppage time.

==== 2021–22 season ====
On 6 March 2022, he scored a brace in a 4–1 win over Manchester United. In the Champions League, he scored a record of seven goals, with the last being in the semi-final second leg away match against Real Madrid to grant his team a 1–0 lead before being subbed off. However, the opponent managed to turn the tie by late goals and extra-time to win 3–1 (6–5 on aggregate) and reach the final.

Mahrez scored 24 goals in all competitions, his personal best record in one season, to be shortlisted for the Ballon d'Or.

==== 2022–23 season ====
On 15 July 2022, Manchester City announced Mahrez had signed a two-year contract extension that would keep him at the club until 2025. On 22 February 2023, he scored his 20th goal in the Champions League in a 1–1 away draw against RB Leipzig in the round of 16, to become the fifth African player to achieve this feat. On 22 April 2023, he became the first player since Alex Dawson in 1958 to score a hat-trick in a FA Cup semi-final, notching three times against Sheffield United in a 3–0 win. On 10 June, Manchester City won 1–0 against Inter Milan in the Champions League final, in which he became the second Algerian to win the competition after Rabah Madjer in 1987. In addition, he managed to win the continental treble with his club, despite not featuring in both FA Cup and Champions League finals.

=== Al-Ahli ===
On 19 July 2023, BBC reported that Manchester City had agreed a deal for Mahrez to join Saudi Pro League club Al Ahli for a transfer fee of £30 million. The transfer was confirmed on 28 July 2023, with Mahrez signing a contract to 2027. On 11 August 2023, Mahrez provided his first assist for Al-Ahli in his first competitive game for the side, assisting Roberto Firmino in a victory against Al-Hazem. A week later, on 17 August, he scored his first goal for the club in a 3–1 away win over Al-Khaleej.

In the 2024–25 season, he won the AFC Champions League Elite with Al Ahli. Hence, he became, along with teammates Roberto Firmino and Édouard Mendy, one of the first players to have won both European and Asian club titles. The following season, he played a role in the team's continental campaign during the 2025–26 season, which culminated in a 1–0 extra-time victory over Machida Zelvia in the final. His contract with the club was terminated on 4 July 2026.

=== Al-Shamal ===
On 15 October 2026, ESPN has reported that free agent Mahrez has joined Qatar Stars League side Al Shamal.

== International career ==
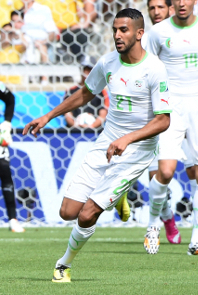
Mahrez playing for Algeria against Belgium at the 2014 FIFA World Cup

In November 2013, the French-born Mahrez expressed his desire to represent Algeria internationally. He was called up to the provisional Algeria squad for the 2014 FIFA World Cup. On 31 May 2014, Mahrez made his international debut for the Desert Foxes as a starter in a pre-World Cup friendly match against Armenia, and he was subsequently called up to the full squad for the tournament on 2 June. The Algerian media were critical of his inclusion and alleged that he had paid manager Vahid Halilhodžić for a place in the squad. Mahrez played in the opening group game against Belgium, then was dropped for the remainder of the tournament, in which Algeria reached the last 16.

On 15 October 2014, Mahrez scored his first international goal, as well as setting up Islam Slimani in Algeria's 3–0, Africa Cup of Nations qualifier against Malawi. In December 2014 he was announced as a member of Algeria's squad for the final tournament in Equatorial Guinea for the first time. His first meeting was against South Africa where he participated in the 60 minutes before the change in the second throw against Ghana substitute in the last 20 minutes where the Algerian team were defeated by a single goal. In their last game in the group stage against Senegal, Mahrez led the national team to the quarter-finals, scoring the first goal of a match ending 2–0. Then against Ivory Coast gave assists for El Arabi Hillel Soudani were not enough to exclude from the quarter-finals 3–1. then in the second Round of the 2018 World Cup qualifier against Tanzania helped Mahrez in the team qualified for the group stage where he scored a goal and assists for Carl Medjani.

Mahrez was named in coach Georges Leekens' Algeria squad for the 2017 Africa Cup of Nations in Gabon. In their opening game, he scored both goals in a 2–2 draw with Zimbabwe and was awarded Man of the Match.

In October 2017, with Algeria's chances of reaching the 2018 FIFA World Cup already ended, Mahrez and his (at the time) Leicester teammate Islam Slimani were dropped from the national team, with coach Lucas Alcaraz selecting several new players. On 18 November 2018, in the 2019 Africa Cup of Nations qualifier Mahrez scored a brace in a 4–1 away victory against Togo, his first goal with the national team since 2017 Africa Cup of Nations to lead Algeria to qualify for the 2019 Africa Cup of Nations.

In May 2019, he was named to Algeria's 23-man squad for the 2019 Africa Cup of Nations. By the decision of coach Djamel Belmadi, Mahrez was chosen to be captain of Algeria at the Africa Cup of Nations. Mahrez scored a 96-minute goal in a 2–1 win against Nigeria in the semi-finals of the competition. Later on, Algeria managed to win the tournament which was their first since 1990.

Mahrez captained Algeria at the delayed 2021 Africa Cup of Nations, held in January 2022. In December 2023, he was named in the 26-man squad for the 2023 Africa Cup of Nations.

On 21 March 2025, Mahrez featured in his 100th international match in a 3–1 away victory over Botswana during the 2026 FIFA World Cup qualification. Later that year, on 9 October, he scored a goal in a 3–0 away victory against Somalia, which ensured his nation's qualification for the 2026 FIFA World Cup. In Algeria's second group-stage match against Jordan, he provided an assist in a 2–1 victory, becoming the oldest Algerian player to register a goal contribution at a World Cup at 35 years and 121 days. On 27 June, he scored his first World Cup goals, netting a brace in a 3–3 draw with Austria as his country qualified for the knockout stage. His two goals tied him with Salah Assad, Abdelmoumene Djabou and Islam Slimani as Algeria's joint top scorers in FIFA World Cup history. In addition, he was named Man of the Match and became the oldest Algerian to score at the World Cup, aged 35 years and 126 days.

Following Algeria's 2–0 defeat to Switzerland in the Round of 32 of the 2026 World Cup, Mahrez announced his retirement from international football.

== Style of play ==
A left-footed player, Mahrez usually plays as a right winger, and has been regarded as one of the best wingers in world football. This position allows him to cut inside and shoot on goal with his stronger foot, or make deliveries into the penalty area; however, he is a versatile player, who is capable of playing anywhere across the front line, in a central role as an attacking midfielder, as a winger on either flank, or even in a centre-forward role as a false 9. A quick, creative, and technically gifted player, his main traits are his trickery, balance, turn of pace, flair, and dribbling skills. Although capable of scoring goals, he is also an excellent assist provider, courtesy of his ability to create chances for his teammates. Despite his ability, however, his record from the penalty spot has been inconsistent throughout his career. In his youth, he was noted for his ball skills, but was often overlooked due to his slender build; when Quimper's youth manager Ronan Salaün and his assistant Mickaël Pellen first noticed Mahrez, they commented that he was talented, a good set-piece taker, and he possessed excellent technique and dribbling skills with both feet, but that he was very slim and was lacking in the tactical aspect of the game, as he played primarily by instinct, having grown up playing street football; as such, after signing him, Salaün advised Mahrez to use his intelligence to avoid challenges, as he believed that he was not strong enough to withstand physical tackles.

Leicester's former head of recruitment, Steve Walsh noted upon observing Mahrez play that: "Riyad was a bit raw but he had a great touch. He could kill the ball dead and go past people. I liked his positivity. Some of his decision-making wasn't that great and defensively he wasn't the best, but you could see that he had real talent." Mahrez has credited his former Leicester manager Claudio Ranieri for helping him to develop the tactical aspect of his game. During his time at Manchester City under manager Pep Guardiola, Mahrez was also able to improve his defensive skills and work-rate, as well as his decision-making. Mahrez has developed his own special skill move dubbed as "La spéciale", in which he fakes a shot with his left foot, then he flicks the ball behind the right foot to dribble past his opponent.

Mahrez'z career is defined by his leadership, including captaining Algeria to their 2019 Africa Cup of Nations title with a decisive free-kick in the semi-final against Nigeria. His role in Algeria's push for the 2026 World Cup underscores his enduring influence, aiming to lead the team back to the global stage after their last appearance in 2014.

== Personal life ==
Mahrez married his British girlfriend, Rita Johal, in 2015. Their daughter was born later that year. In June 2019, the couple, who by that time had two daughters, were ordered to pay a former nanny more than £3,600 in unpaid wages. In October 2020, it was confirmed that Mahrez was in a relationship with English model Taylor Ward after splitting from Johal. They announced their engagement on 21 June 2021. The couple had a daughter in July 2022. The couple had a son named Khayri on 13 November 2025.

Mahrez is a practising Muslim. In June 2017, he made the Umrah pilgrimage to Mecca.

In May 2020, Mahrez lost hundreds of thousands of pounds' worth of valuables after his penthouse apartment in Manchester was burgled.

== Career statistics ==
=== Club ===
As of match played 7 November 2026

Appearances and goals by club, season and competition
Club	Season	League			National cup (Note: Includes Coupe de France, FA Cup, King's Cup)		League cup (Note: Includes Coupe de la Ligue, Football League Cup/EFL Cup)		Continental		Other		Total	
Club	Season	Division	Apps	Goals	Apps	Goals	Apps	Goals	Apps	Goals	Apps	Goals	Apps	Goals
Quimper	2009–10	CFA	27	1	0	0	—		—		—		27	1
Le Havre II	2010–11	CFA	32	13	0	0	0	0	—		—		32	13
Le Havre II	2011–12	CFA	25	11	0	0	0	0	—		—		25	11
Le Havre II	2012–13	CFA	3	0	0	0	0	0	—		—		3	0
Le Havre II	Total		60	24	0	0	0	0	—		—		60	24
Le Havre	2011–12	Ligue 2	9	0	0	0	0	0	—		—		9	0
Le Havre	2012–13	Ligue 2	34	4	4	1	1	0	—		—		39	5
Le Havre	2013–14	Ligue 2	17	2	0	0	2	3	—		—		19	5
Le Havre	Total		60	6	4	1	3	3	—		—		67	10
Leicester City	2013–14	Championship	19	3	0	0	0	0	—		—		19	3
Leicester City	2014–15	Premier League	30	4	1	0	1	0	—		—		32	4
Leicester City	2015–16	Premier League	37	17	0	0	2	1	—		—		39	18
Leicester City	2016–17	Premier League	36	6	2	0	0	0	9 (Note: Appearances in UEFA Champions League)	4	1 (Note: Appearance in FA Community Shield)	0	48	10
Leicester City	2017–18	Premier League	36	12	3	0	2	1	—		—		41	13
Leicester City	Total		158	42	6	0	5	2	9	4	1	0	179	48
Manchester City	2018–19	Premier League	27	7	5	2	5	2	6	1	1	0	44	12
Manchester City	2019–20	Premier League	33	11	5	0	5	1	7	1	0	0	50	13
Manchester City	2020–21	Premier League	27	9	4	0	5	1	12	4	—		48	14
Manchester City	2021–22	Premier League	28	11	4	4	2	2	12	7	1	0	47	24
Manchester City	2022–23	Premier League	30	5	5	5	2	2	9	3	1	0	47	15
Manchester City	Total		145	43	23	11	19	8	46	16	3	0	236	78
Al-Ahli	2023–24	Saudi Pro League	32	11	1	1	—		—		—		33	12
Al-Ahli	2024–25	Saudi Pro League	31	8	0	0	—		13 (Note: Appearances in AFC Champions League Elite)	9	1 (Note: Appearance in Saudi Super Cup)	0	45	17
Al-Ahli	2025–26	Saudi Pro League	27	4	3	0	—		11	4	3 (Note: Two appearances in Saudi Super Cup, one appearance in FIFA Intercontinental Cup)	0	44	8
Al-Ahli	Total		90	23	4	1	0	0	24	13	4	0	122	37
Al Shamal	2026–27	Qatar Stars League	4	3	0	0	0	0	2	0	—		6	3
Career total			544	142	37	13	27	13	81	33	8	0	697	201

=== International ===
Appearances and goals by national team and year
National team	Year	Apps	Goals
Algeria	2014	9	2
Algeria	2015	13	2
Algeria	2016	5	2
Algeria	2017	8	2
Algeria	2018	8	2
Algeria	2019	14	5
Algeria	2020	4	3
Algeria	2021	9	8
Algeria	2022	9	2
Algeria	2023	10	2
Algeria	2024	10	2
Algeria	2025	11	5
Algeria	2026	10	3
Total		120	40

Scores and results list Algeria's goal tally first, score column indicates score after each Mahrez goal

List of international goals scored by Riyad Mahrez
No.	Date	Venue	Opponent	Score	Result	Competition
1	15 October 2014	Mustapha Tchaker Stadium, Blida, Algeria	Malawi	2–0	3–0	2015 Africa Cup of Nations qualification
2	15 November 2014	Mustapha Tchaker Stadium, Blida, Algeria	Ethiopia	2–1	3–1	2015 Africa Cup of Nations qualification
3	27 January 2015	Estadio de Malabo, Malabo, Equatorial Guinea	Senegal	1–0	2–0	2015 Africa Cup of Nations
4	17 November 2015	Mustapha Tchaker Stadium, Blida, Algeria	Tanzania	3–0	7–0	2018 FIFA World Cup qualification
5	4 September 2016	Mustapha Tchaker Stadium, Blida, Algeria	Lesotho	2–0	6–0	2017 Africa Cup of Nations qualification
6	4 September 2016	Mustapha Tchaker Stadium, Blida, Algeria	Lesotho	6–0	6–0	2017 Africa Cup of Nations qualification
7	15 January 2017	Stade de Franceville, Franceville, Gabon	Zimbabwe	1–0	2–2	2017 Africa Cup of Nations
8	15 January 2017	Stade de Franceville, Franceville, Gabon	Zimbabwe	2–2	2–2	2017 Africa Cup of Nations
9	18 November 2018	Stade Municipal, Lomé, Togo	Togo	1–0	4–1	2019 Africa Cup of Nations qualification
10	18 November 2018	Stade Municipal, Lomé, Togo	Togo	3–0	4–1	2019 Africa Cup of Nations qualification
11	23 June 2019	30 June Stadium, Cairo, Egypt	Kenya	2–0	2–0	2019 Africa Cup of Nations
12	7 July 2019	30 June Stadium, Cairo, Egypt	Guinea	2–0	3–0	2019 Africa Cup of Nations
13	14 July 2019	Cairo International Stadium, Cairo, Egypt	Nigeria	2–1	2–1	2019 Africa Cup of Nations
14	15 October 2019	Stade Pierre-Mauroy, Lille, France	Colombia	2–0	3–0	Friendly
15	15 October 2019	Stade Pierre-Mauroy, Lille, France	Colombia	3–0	3–0	Friendly
16	13 October 2020	Cars Jeans Stadion, The Hague, Netherlands	Mexico	2–2	2–2	Friendly
17	12 November 2020	Stade du 5 Juillet, Algiers, Algeria	Zimbabwe	3–0	3–1	2021 Africa Cup of Nations qualification
18	16 November 2020	National Sports Stadium, Harare, Zimbabwe	Zimbabwe	2–0	2–2	2021 Africa Cup of Nations qualification
19	29 March 2021	Mustapha Tchaker Stadium, Blida, Algeria	Botswana	3–0	5–0	2021 Africa Cup of Nations qualification
20	6 June 2021	Mustapha Tchaker Stadium, Blida, Algeria	Mali	1–0	1–0	Friendly
21	11 June 2021	Stade Olympique de Radès, Radès, Tunisia	Tunisia	2–0	2–0	Friendly
22	2 September 2021	Mustapha Tchaker Stadium, Blida, Algeria	Djibouti	7–0	8–0	2022 FIFA World Cup qualification
23	8 October 2021	Mustapha Tchaker Stadium, Blida, Algeria	Niger	1–0	6–1	2022 FIFA World Cup qualification
24	8 October 2021	Mustapha Tchaker Stadium, Blida, Algeria	Niger	3–1	6–1	2022 FIFA World Cup qualification
25	12 October 2021	Stade Général Seyni Kountché, Niamey, Niger	Niger	1–0	4–0	2022 FIFA World Cup qualification
26	16 November 2021	Mustapha Tchaker Stadium, Blida, Algeria	Burkina Faso	1–0	2–2	2022 FIFA World Cup qualification
27	27 September 2022	Miloud Hadefi Stadium, Oran, Algeria	Nigeria	1–1	2–1	Friendly
28	16 November 2022	Miloud Hadefi Stadium, Oran, Algeria	Mali	1–0	1–1	Friendly
29	23 March 2023	Nelson Mandela Stadium, Algiers, Algeria	Niger	2–1	2–1	2023 Africa Cup of Nations qualification
30	20 June 2023	19 May 1956 Stadium, Annaba, Algeria	Tunisia	1–1	1–1	Friendly
31	9 January 2024	Stade de Kégué, Lomé, Togo	Burundi	2–0	4–0	Friendly
32	17 November 2024	Hocine Aït Ahmed Stadium, Tizi Ouzou, Algeria	Liberia	2–1	5–1	2025 Africa Cup of Nations qualification
33	9 October 2025	Miloud Hadefi Stadium, Oran, Algeria	Somalia	2–0	3–0	2026 FIFA World Cup qualification
34	18 November 2025	Prince Abdullah Al-Faisal Sports City Stadium, Jeddah, Saudi Arabia	Saudi Arabia	1–0	2–0	Friendly
35	24 December 2025	Moulay El Hassan Stadium, Rabat, Morocco	Sudan	1–0	3–0	2025 Africa Cup of Nations
36	24 December 2025	Moulay El Hassan Stadium, Rabat, Morocco	Sudan	2–0	3–0	2025 Africa Cup of Nations
37	28 December 2025	Moulay El Hassan Stadium, Rabat, Morocco	Burkina Faso	1–0	1–0	2025 Africa Cup of Nations
38	27 March 2026	Stadio Luigi Ferraris, Genoa, Italy	Guatemala	2–0	7–0	Friendly
39	27 June 2026	Arrowhead Stadium, Kansas City, United States	Austria	2–2	3–3	2026 FIFA World Cup
40	27 June 2026	Arrowhead Stadium, Kansas City, United States	Austria	3–2	3–3	2026 FIFA World Cup

== Honours ==
Leicester City

- Premier League: 2015–16
- Football League Championship: 2013–14

Manchester City

- Premier League: 2018–19, 2020–21, 2021–22, 2022–23
- FA Cup: 2018–19, 2022–23
- EFL Cup: 2018–19, 2019–20, 2020–21
- UEFA Champions League: 2022–23; runner-up: 2020–21
- FA Community Shield: 2018 2019

Al-Ahli

- AFC Champions League Elite: 2024–25, 2025–26
- Saudi Super Cup: 2025

Algeria

- Africa Cup of Nations: 2019

Individual

- CAF African Footballer of the Year: 2016
- BBC African Footballer of the Year: 2016
- Algerian Footballer of the Year: 2015, 2016
- PFA Team of the Year: 2015–16 Premier League
- PFA Players' Player of the Year: 2015–16
- PFA Fans' Player of the Year: 2015–16
- Leicester City Player of the Year: 2015–16
- El Heddaf Arab Footballer of the Year: 2016
- Lion d'Or African Footballer of the Year: 2016
- CAF Team of the Year: 2016, 2018, 2019
- CAF Africa Cup of Nations Team of the Tournament: 2019
- African Goal of the Year: 2019
- IFFHS CAF Men Team of The Year: 2020
- IFFHS CAF Men's Team of the Decade 2011–2020
- IFFHS All Time Algeria Men's Dream Team
- PFA Fans' Player of the Month: March 2021 January 2023
- Alan Hardaker Trophy: 2021
- IFFHS CAF World's Best Playmaker: 2021

== See also ==
- List of men's footballers with 100 or more international caps
