= Refik =

Refik is a masculine given name of Arabic origin meaning friend, associate, husband, companion or fellow. It may refer to:

- Ahmet Refik Altınay (1881–1937), Ottoman historian, writer and poet
- Refik Anadol (born 1985), Turkish media artist
- Refik Durbaş (1944–2018), Turkish poet, writer
- Refik Erduran (1928–2017), Turkish playwright, columnist and writer
- Refik Halili, Albanian businessman
- Refik Halit Karay (1888–1965), Turkish writer and journalist
- Refik Kolić (born 1965), Bosnian folk music singer
- Refik Koraltan (1889–1974, Turkish politician
- Refik Kozić (born 1950), Yugoslav footballer
- Refik Memišević (1956–2004), Yugoslav Olympian wrestler
- Refik Resmja(1931–1997), Albanian footballer
- Refik Šabanadžović (born 1965), Yugoslav footballer
- Refik Saydam (1881–1942), Turkish politician and prime minister
- Refik Osman Top (1897–1957), Turkish footballer, referee, coach and sports columnist
