= Djamel Belmadi =

Football manager (born 1976)

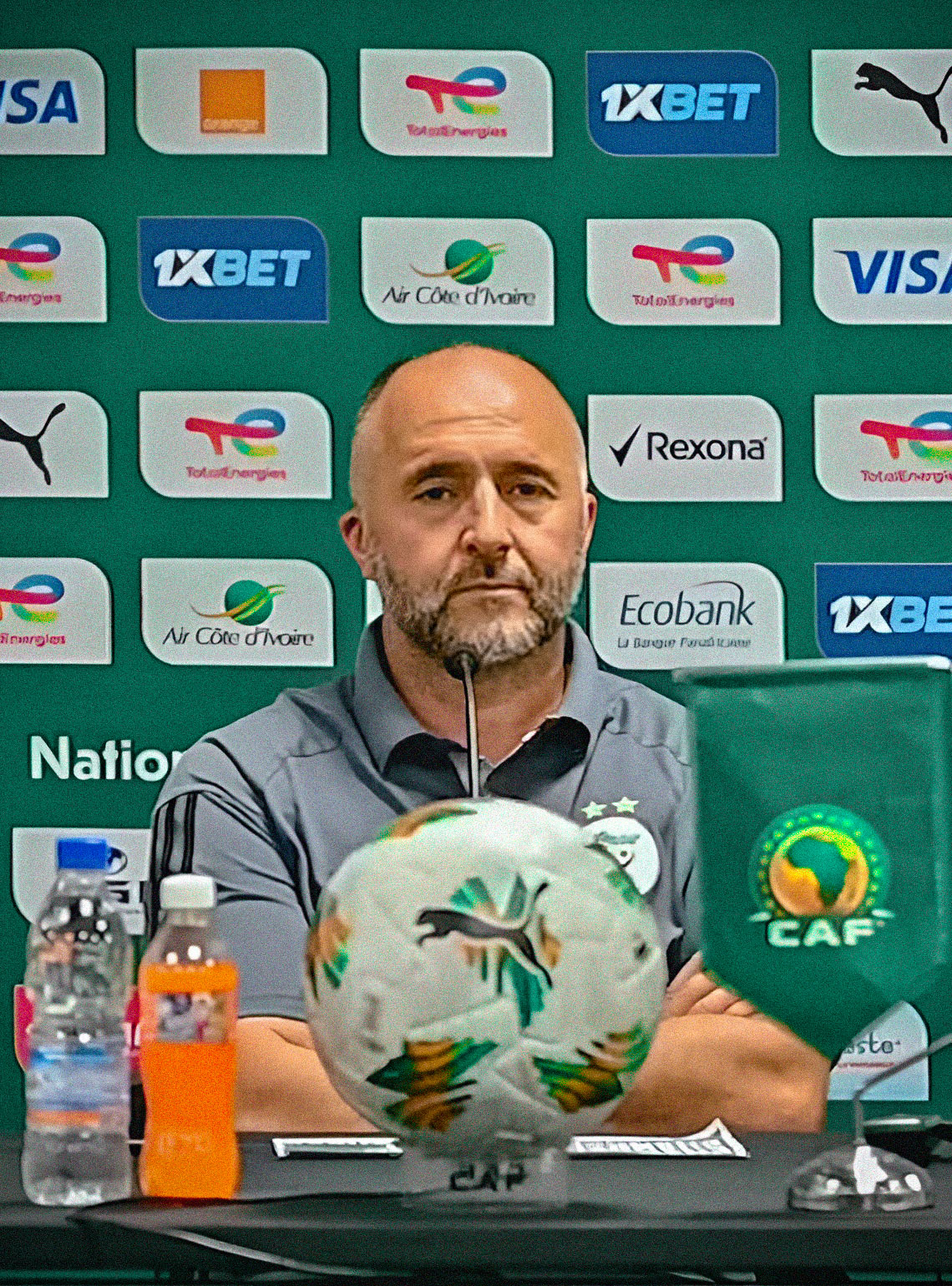
- Belmadi in 2024

Personal information
- Full name: Djamel Belmadi
- Date of birth: 25 March 1976 (age 50)
- Place of birth: Champigny-sur-Marne, France
- Height: 1.75 m (5 ft 9 in)
- Position: Midfielder

Team information
- Current team: Al-Duhail (head coach)

Youth career
- 1986–1987: PA Champigny
- 1987–1992: AS Sucy-en-Brie
- 1992–1996: Paris Saint-Germain

Senior career*
Years	Team	Apps	(Gls)
1996	Paris Saint-Germain	1	(0)
1996–1997	Martigues	31	(8)
1997–1998	Marseille	0	(0)
1998–1999	Cannes	26	(6)
1999–2003	Marseille	48	(9)
1999–2000	→ Celta Vigo (loan)	10	(0)
2003	→ Manchester City (loan)	8	(0)
2003–2004	Al-Ittihad (QAT)		
2004–2005	Al-Kharaitiyat		
2005–2007	Southampton	36	(3)
2007–2009	Valenciennes	37	(2)
Total		197+	(28+)

International career
2000–2004	Algeria	20	(5)

Managerial career
- 2010–2012: Lekhwiya
- 2013–2014: Qatar B
- 2014–2015: Qatar
- 2015–2018: Al-Duhail (Note: In 2017, Lekhwiya SC was rebranded to Al-Duhail SC following the absorption El Jaish SC.)
- 2018–2024: Algeria
- 2025–: Al-Duhail
Medal record
Men's football
Representing Algeria (as manager)
Africa Cup of Nations
Winner	2019
Representing Qatar (as manager)
WAFF Championship
Winner	2014
Arabian Gulf Cup
Winner	2014
- * Club domestic league appearances and goals

Djamel Belmadi (Arabic: جَمَال بَلمَاضِيّ; born 25 March 1976) is a professional football coach and former player. He is the current head coach of Qatar Stars League side Al Duhail. Born in France, he represented Algeria internationally between 2000 and 2004.

As a player he was midfielder who had spells in Ligue 1 with Paris Saint-Germain, Marseille, Cannes and Valenciennes. He also briefly played in La Liga for Celta Vigo and in the Premier League for Manchester City. Later on in his career he returned to England and played several seasons at Southampton whilst the club were in the Football League. He also played for Martigues, Al-Ittihad and Al-Kharitiyath. Born in France, he played internationally for Algeria and was capped 20 times.

As a coach, Belmadi has managed Lekhwiya, Qatar B, Qatar, Al-Duhail and most recently, Algeria.

== Club career ==
=== France and Spain ===
Born in Champigny-sur-Marne, France, Belmadi started his career at Paris Saint-Germain, making his debut in January 1996 against Gueugnon, before spending a season at Martigues. He spent the 1997–98 season at Marseille, and then moved to Cannes for the 1998–99 season. In August 1999, he was signed again by Marseille, but immediately went on loan to Spanish club Celta Vigo.

In January 2000, Belmadi returned to Marseille, eventually securing a regular place in the first team's midfield in 2000–01. In January 2001, he made good use of a rare opportunity presented him to play in Marseille's attack, when Liberian maestro George Weah—who had been the main attacker—was away on international duty with the Lone Stars of Liberia. Belmadi seized the opportunity to score a vital goal for Marseille against fellow strugglers Toulouse to keep Marseille just outside the relegation zone.

On 14 April 2001, he scored the winning goal in Marseille's 2–1 victory over Sedan, before a near–60,000 crowd, giving Bernard Tapie's team a much needed lifeline out of relegation.

=== Manchester City ===
In January 2003, Belmadi had fallen out of favour at Marseille, now managed by Alain Perrin, who agreed to loan him to Kevin Keegan’s Manchester City after a successful trial. He joined ranks with fellow Algerian Ali Benarbia.

He made his full debut for Manchester City on 29 January 2003 at Maine Road in a 4–1 victory against Fulham (alongside another recruit from the French league – David Sommeil).

In Belmadi's brief time at Manchester City, he only made two starts and six substitute appearances, the last of which was in a 1–0 defeat against Southampton on 11 May 2003 in the final league game at Maine Road.

Although Kevin Keegan liked Belmadi's style of play, he conceded that he could not afford another free spirit in a side already containing Eyal Berkovic and Ali Bernabia, so Belmadi returned to Marseille.

In August 2003, he was released by Marseille and played the 2003–04 and 2004–05 seasons in Qatar with Al-Ittihad and Al-Kharitiyath.

=== Southampton ===
In July 2005, after trials at Celtic, Wigan Athletic and Sunderland, Belmadi joined Southampton (then playing in the Football League Championship) for their pre-season tour of Scotland. Harry Redknapp initially gave Belmadi a one-month contract, and he made his debut on 6 August 2005 in a 0–0 draw against Wolverhampton Wanderers. His contract was extended until the end of the 2005–06 season after impressive performances in his early games, including a goal against Crewe Alexandra on 27 August 2005. In January 2006, he picked up a thigh injury, which put him out of the team until April.

Belmadi had, however, done enough to persuade Southampton, now managed by George Burley, to re-sign him for the 2006–07 season. This was again blighted by injury problems, including a knee injury picked up in September, which put him out until February. He picked up several other niggling injuries putting him out for long periods. When fit, there was no doubting Belmadi's ability and quality on the ball whether playing on the left or right of midfield. At his best, he could unpick defenses with his passing and kept the ball well. Unfortunately, his injuries restricted him to 40 appearances in his two years at St Mary's. His contract with the Saints expired on 30 June 2007 and was not renewed as Southampton faced up to the financial realities of a third season in the Championship.

=== Valenciennes ===
After being released by Southampton, Belmadi returned to France and joined Valenciennes. He retired from football in 2009.

== International career ==
Belmadi made his debut for Algeria on 9 July 2000 against Morocco. He was part of the Algerian 2004 African Nations Cup team, who finished second in their group in the first round of competition before being defeated by Morocco in the quarter-finals. Belmadi last played for Algeria in a World Cup qualifier against Zimbabwe on 20 June 2004, having made 20 appearances and scoring 5 goals.

== Managerial career ==
=== Lekhwiya ===
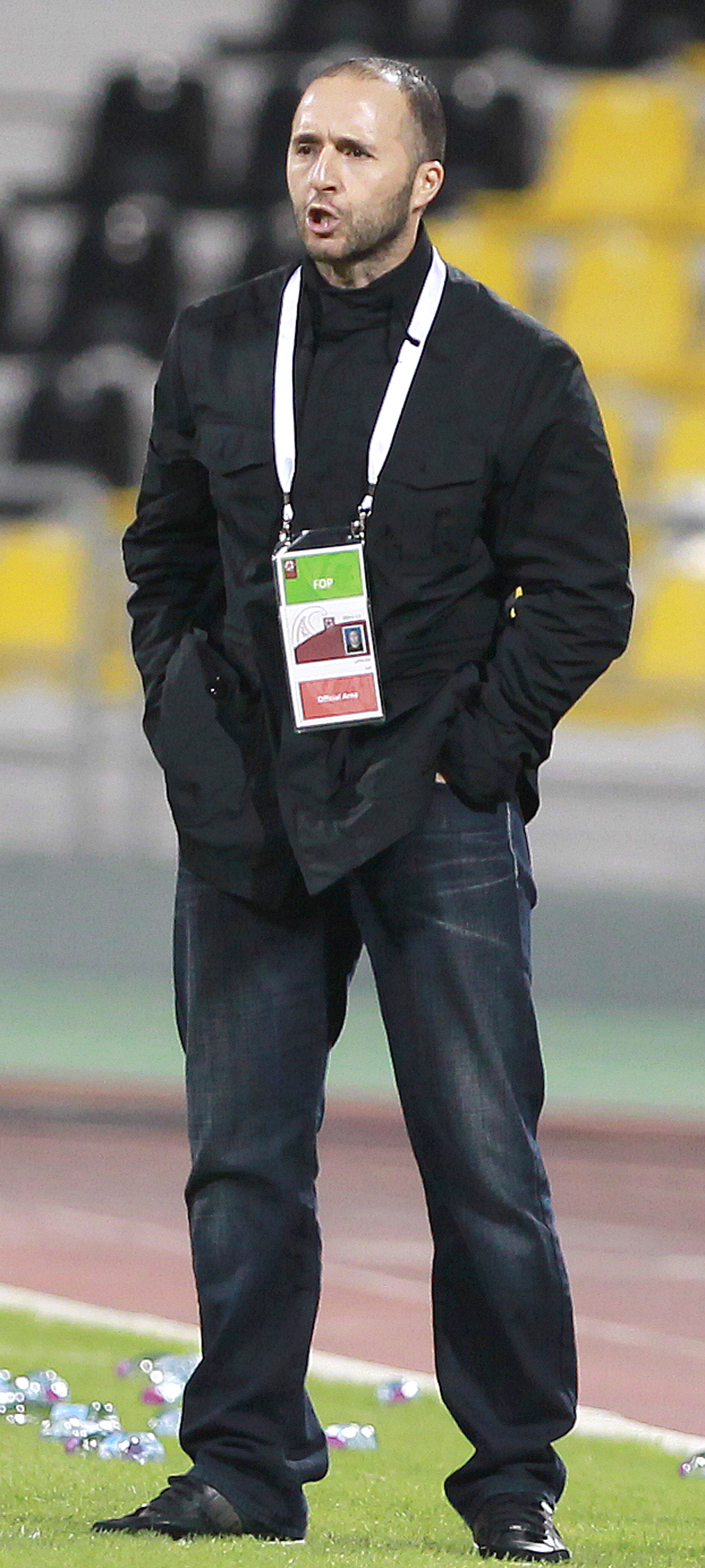
Belmadi coaching Lekhwiya in a Qatar Stars League match against Al Sadd

In the summer of 2010, Belmadi was appointed as the head coach of newly promoted Qatar Stars League club Lekhwiya. In his first season with the club, he led them to the 2010–11 Qatar Stars League title for the first time in the club's history. He also led them to the final of the 2010 Sheikh Jassem Cup, where they lost to Al Arabi. For the second time, Lekhwiya won the 2011–12 Qatar Stars League title, under the management of Belmadi. He resigned on 8 October 2012 after a bad start of the 2012–13 season.

=== Qatar B ===
In December 2013, Belmadi was appointed as head coach of the Qatar B team, which was set to participate in the 2014 WAFF Championship on home soil. He called up a number of foreigners to the national team, including compatriots Boualem Khoukhi and Karim Boudiaf after being informed by the QFA that they were eligible to compete for Qatar. Qatar were crowned champions of the 2014 WAFF Championship after defeating Jordan on 7 January. They finished the tournament undefeated, with 10 goals scored and a single goal conceded.

=== Qatar senior team ===
On 15 March 2014, Belmadi was unveiled as the new head coach of the Qatar senior football team, replacing Fahad Thani. His first match as Qatar coach was a 0–0 draw with Macedonia. He led his team to a notable 1–0 first-ever victory over Australia in a friendly match on 14 October 2014, after having posted a 5–0 win over Lebanon and a 3–0 victory over Uzbekistan in their two previous matches. In correspondence to Qatar's performance in the aforementioned friendly matches, sports channel Al Kass stated that Qatar is "showing signs of evolution with Belmadi" and that the team was "undergoing a renewal." He led Qatar to win the 22nd Arabian Gulf Cup by beating host Saudi Arabia in the final. However, Qatar showed a poor form in the 2015 AFC Asian Cup and was eliminated in the group stages after three consecutive defeats by United Arab Emirates, Iran and Bahrain. He was dismissed from his post on 30 April 2015.

=== Al-Duhail ===
On 19 June 2015, Belmadi was appointed for the second time in his career to coach Lekhwiya; he was a replacement for Michael Laudrup. In 2017, the club was rebranded to Al-Duhail SC following the absorption of El Jaish.

=== Algeria ===
On 2 August 2018, Belmadi became the manager of the Algeria national team. At his second international football championship (having coached Qatar in the 2015 AFC Asian Cup), Belmadi's Algerian team was not considered a serious contender for the trophy because Algeria's performance in the 2019 Africa Cup of Nations qualification was not promising, despite topping the group with two draws to Gambia and an away-loss to Benin. The unimpressive qualification campaign increased the pressure on Belmadi.

Despite heavy criticism, Belmadi led Algeria to success and earned his first international trophy. Algeria defeated every opponent on its road to the final of the 2019 Africa Cup of Nations (AFCON) held in Egypt, including two victories over Senegal in the group stage and the final. Algeria won its second continental title and became the North African second team, after Egypt, to win more than one AFCON trophy.

In the 2021 AFCON, the defending champions Algeria finished last in their group to be eliminated from the tournament. During the 2022 World Cup qualification third round, Algeria failed to qualify to the final tournament in Qatar, having lost on away goals rule against Cameroon following a 2–2 draw on aggregate.

In January 2023, Belmadi extended his contract until 2026.

In the 2023 AFCON held in Ivory Coast, Algeria led by Belmadi exited the tournament after their defeat against Mauritania, without scoring any win in the group phase. On 24 January 2024, Belmadi's position as national team manager was terminated by mutual consent. However, despite immediately resigning himself in front of the players, Belmadi asked the FAF for a severance package worth 29 months of salary, equivalent to €7 million. Faced with a refusal from the FAF, he then threatened to bring the matter to the FIFA for a ruling.

=== Return to Al-Duhail ===
In June 2025, Belmadi returned to Al-Duhail for his third spell as head coach.

== Bank theft incident ==
While Belmadi was with Manchester City, he, along with players Daniel Van Buyten and Vicente Vuoso, were the victims of a theft by two bank workers. At the time that Belmadi left Manchester City, he left £230,000 in an account with the Co-operative Bank. In total, the bank workers stole more than £350,000 from the accounts of the three players.

In January 2006, the bank workers, Paul Sherwood, a cashier, and Paul Hanley, his supervisor, were jailed for 32 months and 12 months respectively.

== Career statistics ==
Appearances and goals by national team and year
National team	Year	Apps	Goals
Algeria	2000	2	0
Algeria	2001	6	2
Algeria	2002	1	2
Algeria	2003	3	1
Algeria	2004	8	0
Total		20	5

Scores and results list Algeria's goal tally first, score column indicates score after each Belmadi goal.

List of international goals scored by Djamel Belmadi
No.	Date	Venue	Opponent	Score	Result	Competition
1	26 January 2001	Stade 5 Juillet 1962, Algiers, Algeria	Namibia	1–0	1–0	2002 FIFA World Cup qualification
2	6 October 2001	Stade de France, Saint-Denis, France	France	1–3	1–4	Friendly
3	11 October 2002	Stade 19 Mai 1956, Annaba, Algeria	Chad	3–0	4–1	2004 African Cup of Nations qualification
4	11 October 2002	Stade 19 Mai 1956, Annaba, Algeria	Chad	4–0	4–1	2004 African Cup of Nations qualification
5	12 February 2003	Stade 19 Mai 1956, Annaba, Algeria	Belgium	1–3	1–3	Friendly

== Managerial statistics ==
As of match played 13 July 2026

Managerial record by team and tenure
Team	From	To	Record					Ref.
Team	From	To	P	W	D	L	Win %	Ref.
(Qatar) Lekhwiya	1 July 2010	8 October 2012	42	27	9	6	64.3	
Qatar B	December 2013	January 2014	5	5	0	0	100.0	
Qatar	15 March 2014	30 April 2015	20	9	7	4	45.0	
(Qatar) Al-Duhail	19 January 2015	12 July 2018	104	72	15	17	69.2	
Algeria	18 August 2018	24 January 2024	64	41	17	6	64.1	
(Qatar) Al-Duhail	7 June 2025	Present	46	16	11	19	34.8	
Total			303	185	66	52	61.1	

== Honours ==
=== As a player ===
Individual

- DZFoot d'Or: 2000, 2001
- Algerian Ballon d'or: 2001

=== As a manager ===
Al-Duhail

- Qatar Stars League: 2010–11, 2011–12, 2016–17, 2017–18
- Emir of Qatar Cup: 2016, 2018
- Qatar Cup: 2018

Qatar B

- WAFF Championship: 2014

Qatar

- Arabian Gulf Cup: 2014

Algeria

- Africa Cup of Nations: 2019

Individual

- Qatar Stars League Manager of the Season : 2017–18
- CAF Coach of the Year: 2019
- IFFHS CAF Best National Coach: 2021
