= El Heddaf =

Algerian daily football newspaper

El Heddaf (in Arabic الهدّاف meaning The Scorer) is an Algerian nationwide daily newspaper devoted to football.

== Profile ==
El Haddaf has a French edition named Le Buteur. The paper organizes several events and activities about sports in the country.

The paper's online version was the fourth most visited website for 2010 in the MENA region.

== Arab Footballer of the Year ==
- 2007 :Mohamed Aboutrika
- 2008 :Mohamed Aboutrika
- 2009 : Madjid Bougherra
- 2010 :Mohamed Zidan
- 2011 :Adel Taarabt
- 2012 :Mohamed Aboutrika
- 2013 :Mohamed Salah
- 2014 :Yacine Brahimi
- 2015 : Mehdi Benatia
- 2016 - Riyad Mahrez
- 2017 : Mohamed Salah
- 2018 : Mohamed Salah
