= Madjid Bougherra =

Footballer and coach (born 1982)

- Bougherra in 2021

Personal information
- Full name: Madjid Bougherra
- Date of birth: 7 October 1982 (age 44)
- Place of birth: Dijon, France
- Height: 1.90 m (6 ft 3 in)
- Position: Centre-back

Team information
- Current team: Lebanon (head coach)

Youth career
- 1999–2000: AS Quetigny
- 2000–2002: AS Longvic

Senior career*
Years	Team	Apps	(Gls)
2002–2006	Gueugnon	49	(1)
2006	→ Crewe Alexandra (loan)	11	(1)
2006–2007	Sheffield Wednesday	28	(2)
2007–2008	Charlton Athletic	34	(2)
2008–2011	Rangers	71	(3)
2011–2014	Lekhwiya	44	(3)
2014–2016	Fujairah	39	(2)
2016	Aris	0	(0)
Total		276	(14)

International career
2004	Algeria U23	3	(0)
2004–2015	Algeria	70	(4)

Managerial career
- 2017–2019: Al Duhail U23
- 2019–2020: Fujairah
- 2020–2023: Algeria A'
- 2023–2024: Al-Markhiya
- 2024–2025: Algeria A'
- 2026–: Lebanon
Medal record
Men's football
Representing Algeria (as manager)
FIFA Arab Cup
Winner	2021 Qatar
African Nations Championship
Runner-up	2022 Algeria
- * Club domestic league appearances and goals

Madjid Bougherra (Arabic: مجيد بوقرة; born 7 October 1982) is a professional football manager and former player who is the head coach of the Lebanon national team. Born in France, he played as a centre-back for the Algeria national team.

Bougherra began his professional career with French club Gueugnon, before having spells with Crewe Alexandra, Sheffield Wednesday, and Charlton Athletic in England. He moved to Rangers in 2008 for a fee of £2.5 million and made 113 appearances; he was a key part of the team that won the Scottish Premier League championship in the 2008–09, 2009–10, and 2010–11 seasons. He signed for Lekhwiya of Qatar in 2011 for £1.7 million, moving to Emirati club Fujairah three years later. Bougherra ended his club career following a short spell at Aris in Greece.

Bougherra played for the Algeria national team from 2004 to 2015, earning 70 international caps and scoring four goals. He participated in the 2010 Africa Cup of Nations, where Algeria finished fourth, the 2010 FIFA World Cup, and the 2014 FIFA World Cup, where he served as the team's captain.

Bougherra began his managerial career in 2017, coaching Qatari side Al Duhail's under-23 team. Two years later, he was appointed manager of Fujairah in the United Arab Emirates, departing in February 2020 on the onset of the COVID-19 pandemic. In June 2020, Bougherra was announced as the Algeria A' national team coach, helping them lift the 2021 FIFA Arab Cup. In October 2023, he became head coach of Al-Markhiya in Qatar, before returning to coach Algeria A' in December 2024, resigning after his side's quarter-final elimination in the 2025 FIFA Arab Cup.

== Club career ==
=== Early life and career ===
Bougherra was born and raised in Dijon, Côte-d'Or in eastern France. He began his career at AS Quetigny in 1999.

=== Gueugnon ===
Bougherra joined Gueugnon in July 2002. Whilst with the Ligue 2 club, Bougherra made 49 league appearances and scored one goal. He also made a single appearance in the Coupe de la Ligue.

=== Crewe Alexandra ===
Bougherra joined English Championship club Crewe Alexandra on loan at the end of January 2006. He managed to get into the Crewe record books as his agent, Charles Collymore recommended the Algerian defender to the South Cheshire club and was given £5,000 by the club, making him the first agent to receive a fee from Crewe.

After a number of impressive performances, including a goal in the 4–1 win over Coventry City, many of the club's supporters urged then manager Dario Gradi to sign Bougherra on a permanent basis. However, in April 2006, he confirmed he would leave Crewe at the end of his loan spell after failing to help the club avoid relegation to League One.

=== Sheffield Wednesday ===
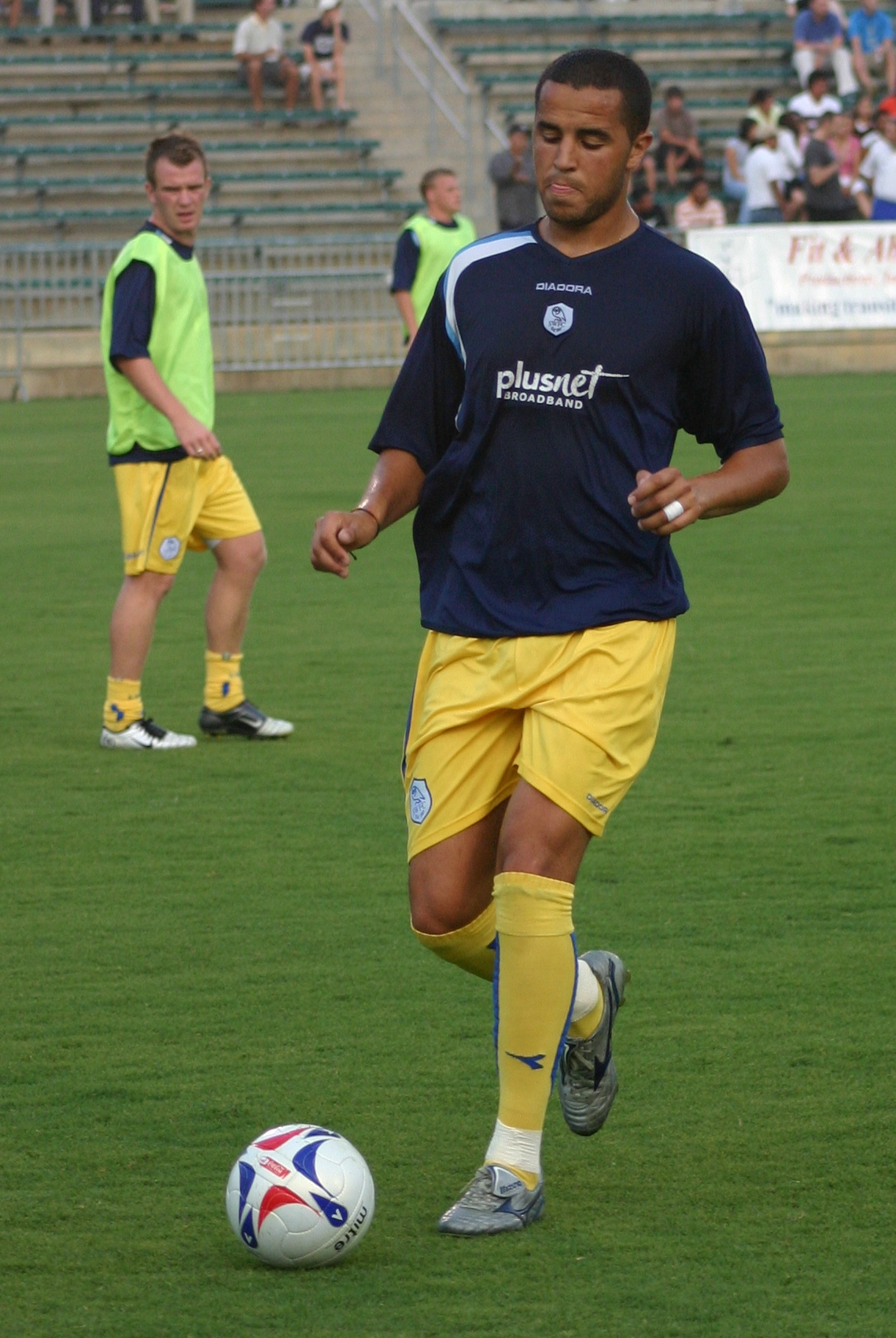
Bougherra playing for Sheffield Wednesday in 2006

Bougherra's performances at Crewe had attracted interest from a number of clubs in England, including some from the Premier League. He signed for another Championship club, Sheffield Wednesday, in May 2006. The fee was undisclosed, but according to manager Paul Sturrock it was not as much as the reported £300,000. Bougherra made a big impact at Hillsborough after making his debut on 5 August against Preston North End, winning the Player of the Month award in only his second month at the club and captaining the team for the first time against Queens Park Rangers at home in October. He also scored twice for Wednesday, against Ipswich Town and West Bromwich Albion in the first half of the 2006–07 season.

=== Charlton Athletic ===
During the January 2007 transfer window, Bougherra was linked with several Premier League clubs. Sheffield Wednesday rejected a £1.3 million offer from Charlton Athletic, whilst Reading, Everton and Birmingham City were also rumoured to be interested. Eventually the Owls accepted an increased offer of £2.5 million from Charlton for Bougherra, who completed his move to The Valley on 28 January 2007. Bougherra was linked with a transfer to West Brom in the summer of 2008 after a transfer fee of £2.5 million was accepted by Charlton. However, Bougherra chose not to join Albion, saying that the absence of West Brom chairman Jeremy Peace during negotiations was a major factor; Peace commented that his presence was not required for the transfer to go through.

=== Rangers ===
Bougherra joined Rangers, signing a four-year contract for £2.5 million on 31 July 2008. He made his debut on 9 August in a Scottish Premier League match against Falkirk, and scored his first goal on 28 September 2008 in a 3–0 win against Hibernian. After Rangers lost Carlos Cuéllar to Aston Villa, Bougherra formed a consistent partnership alongside David Weir. Bougherra was sent off in a 2–1 win over Aberdeen in May 2009 after a challenge with Jamie Langfield. The red card was reduced to a yellow upon appeal after the referee changed his decision after reviewing the incident. Bougherra was available for the title decider against Dundee United the following weekend which Rangers won 3–0, winning them the title. Bougherra ended his first season in Scottish football by winning the Scottish Cup in a 1–0 win over Falkirk.

On 12 September 2009, Bougherra was shown two yellows in the same minute against Motherwell at Fir Park, in doing so giving away a penalty. On 16 September 2009, he scored a solo goal in the 77th minute to make it 1–1 against VfB Stuttgart in the group stage of the 2009–10 UEFA Champions League, earning Rangers a point. The goal came on Bougherra's European debut for the club. After playing for Algeria against Rwanda in a 2010 FIFA World Cup qualifier Bougherra returned to Scotland two days late and was subsequently dropped for a league match away to St Johnstone on 17 October. He was late returning from international duty again in November after being caught up in Algeria's World Cup qualification celebrations. On 3 May 2010, Bougherra was awarded the PFA Scotland goal of the season for his effort in the 7–1 win over Dundee United in December 2009.

Bougherra missed much of the second half of the 2009–10 season through injury, but picked up his second SPL winners medal after Rangers clinched back-to-back league titles in 2010.

On 14 September 2010, Bougherra was named as the man of the match in the opening group game of the 2010–11 UEFA Champions League against Manchester United at Old Trafford, with the game ending 0–0. On 26 January 2011, he scored with a volley in a 2–0 win over Hibernian.

In March 2011, Bougherra announced that he intended to leave Rangers at the end of the 2010–11 season after turning down a new contract. Bougherra was fined £2500 by the SFA for manhandling referee Callum Murray during an Old Firm match in 2011. On 3 August in a 2011–12 UEFA Champions League qualifier against Malmö FF, Bougherra was shown a straight red card for elbowing an opponent, which proved to be his last game for the club.

=== Lekhwiya ===
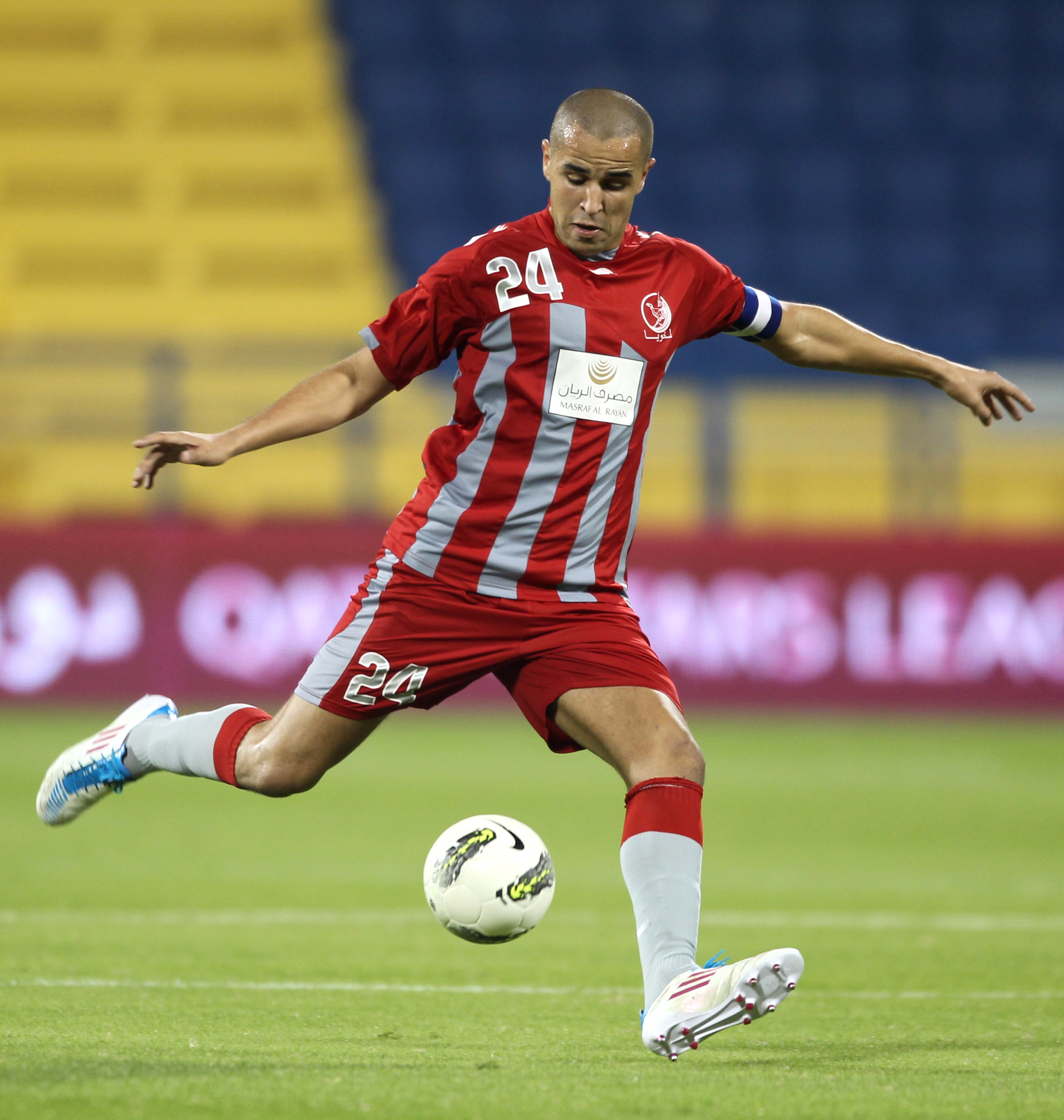
Bougherra playing for Lekhwiya in 2011

In August 2011, Bougherra moved to Qatari club Lekhwiya for £1.7 million. Bougherra made his league debut on 16 September in a match against Al-Wakrah where he scored the only goal of the match, thus scoring the first goal of the 2011–12 season. In his first season with the club, he helped Lekhwiya win the 2011–12 Qatar Stars League. Bougherra left Lekhwiya in May 2014.

=== Aris, retirement ===
On 9 September 2016, Bougherra signed for Football League Greece club Aris. Three months later, after not featuring for Aris and only appearing on the bench once, Bougherra announced his retirement from football.

== International career ==
Bougherra was born in France. He holds French and Algerian nationalities. He opted to play for Algeria. He made his debut at under-23 level on 2 January 2004, in a 2004 Summer Olympics qualifier against Ghana. He made two more appearances at under-23 level in qualifiers against Ghana and Zambia.

Bougherra made his full debut for the Algeria national team in a 2006 FIFA World Cup qualifier on 20 June 2004 against Zimbabwe. On 2 July 2007, he scored his first goal in a 2–2 draw against Cape Verde. His second goal came on 20 June 2009, a header from a free kick in the 2010 FIFA World Cup qualifier against Zambia, which ended in a 2–0 win, putting them at the top of their group.

== Managerial career ==
In 2017, Bougherra joined Georges Leekens's technical coaching staff in the Algeria national team. In the summer of 2017, he became manager of Al Duhail's reserve/under-23 team.

On 16 June 2019, Bougherra was appointed manager of Emirati club Fujairah. On 9 February 2020, he departed by a mutual consent during the COVID-19 pandemic.

On 22 June 2020, the Algerian Football Federation announced the appointment of Bougherra to the position of coach of the Algeria A' national team. A year later, he led his country to win the 2021 FIFA Arab Cup following a 2–0 win after extra time in the final against Tunisia.

In October 2023, Bougherra became the head coach of Qatari side Al-Markhiya. He later returned to coach the Algeria A' national team in December 2024. He resigned after his team was eliminated in the quarter-finals of the 2025 FIFA Arab Cup, following a penalty shootout defeat to the United Arab Emirates.

On 28 January 2026, Bougherra was appointed head coach of the Lebanon national team on a three-year contract.

== Career statistics ==
=== Club ===
Appearances and goals by club, season and competition
Club	Season	League		National cup		League cup		Continental		Other		Total	
Club	Season	Apps	Goals	Apps	Goals	Apps	Goals	Apps	Goals	Apps	Goals	Apps	Goals
Crewe Alexandra (loan)	2005–06	11	1	0	0	0	0	—		—		11	1
Sheffield Wednesday	2006–07	28	2	0	0	1	0	—		—		29	2
Charlton Athletic	2006–07	5	0	0	0	0	0	—		—		5	0
Charlton Athletic	2007–08	29	2	2	0	2	0	—		—		33	2
Charlton Athletic	Total	34	2	2	0	2	0	0	0	0	0	38	2
Rangers	2008–09	27	1	5	0	3	0	0	0	4	0	39	1
Rangers	2009–10	16	1	2	0	1	0	3	1	1	0	23	2
Rangers	2010–11	26	1	3	0	4	1	9	0	5	0	47	2
Rangers	2011–12	2	0	0	0	0	0	2	0	0	0	4	0
Rangers	Total	71	3	10	0	8	1	14	1	10	0	113	5
Career total		144	8	12	0	11	1	14	1	10	0	191	10

=== International ===
Scores and results list Algeria's goal tally first, score column indicates score after each Bougherra goal.

List of international goals scored by Madjid Bougherra
No.	Date	Venue	Opponent	Score	Result	Competition	Ref.
1	2 June 2007	Estádio da Várzea, Praia, Cape Verde	Cape Verde	1–0	2–2	2008 Africa Cup of Nations qualification	
2	20 June 2009	Konkola Stadium, Chililabombwe, Zambia	Zambia	1–0	2–0	2010 FIFA World Cup qualification	
3	24 January 2010	Estádio Nacional do Chiazi, Lubango, Angola	Ivory Coast	2–2	3–2	2010 Africa Cup of Nations	
4	19 November 2013	Mustapha Tchaker Stadium, Blida, Algeria	Burkina Faso	1–0	1–0	2014 FIFA World Cup qualification	

=== Managerial ===
As of match played 17 November 2026

Managerial record by team and tenure
Team	From	To	Record				
Team	From	To	P	W	D	L	Win %
Fujairah	16 June 2019	9 February 2020	22	6	3	13	27.3
Algeria A'	22 June 2020	4 October 2023	14	10	4	0	71.4
Al-Markhiya	18 October 2023	4 June 2024	20	4	3	13	20.0
Algeria A'	13 December 2024	12 December 2025	15	5	8	2	33.3
Lebanon	28 January 2026	present	5	1	2	2	20.0
Total			76	26	20	30	34.2

== Honours ==
=== Player ===
Rangers

- Scottish Premier League: 2008–09, 2009–10, 2010–11
- Scottish Cup: 2008–09
- Scottish League Cup: 2009–10, 2010–11

Lekhwiya

- Qatar Stars League: 2011–12, 2013–14
- Qatar Crown Prince Cup: 2013

=== Manager ===
Algeria

- FIFA Arab Cup: 2021
- African Nations championship runner-up: 2022

Individual

- PFA Scotland Team of the Year: 2008–09, 2010–11
- Rangers Player of the Year: 2009
- PFA Scotland Goal of the Season: 2010
- Algerian Footballer of the Year: 2009, 2010
- DZFoot d'Or: 2009, 2010
- El Heddaf Arab Footballer of the Year: 2009
- CAF Team of the Year: 2010
- Africa Cup of Nations Team of the Tournament: 2010
- Algeria Press Service: Best Algerian Athletes of the Year: 2010
