= Moussa Saïb =

Algerian footballer and manager (born 1969)

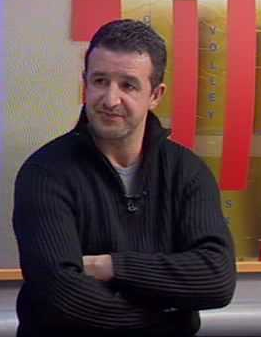
- Saïb in 2011

Personal information
- Date of birth: 6 March 1969 (age 57)
- Place of birth: Théniet El Had, Algeria
- Position: Midfielder

Youth career
- 1981–1987: CS Theniet El-Had
- 1987–1988: JSM Tiaret

Senior career*
Years	Team	Apps	(Gls)
1988–1989	JSM Tiaret		
1989–1992	JS Kabylie		
1992–1997	Auxerre	153	(25)
1997–1998	Valencia	14	(0)
1998–2000	Tottenham Hotspur	13	(1)
2000–2001	Al-Nassr		
2001–2003	Auxerre	17	(0)
2002	Monaco	7	(1)
2002	→ Lorient (loan)	8	(1)
2003–2004	Dubai		

International career
1989–2001	Algeria	74	(7)

Managerial career
- 2006–2007: Noisy-le-Sec
- 2006–2008: JS Kabylie
- 2008: Al Watani
- 2009: ASO Chlef
- 2011: JS Kabylie
- * Club domestic league appearances and goals

Moussa Saïb (Kabyle: Musa Sayb; born 6 March 1969) is an Algerian football manager and former player.

== Club career ==
Saïb started his football career with a club from the west of Algeria called (Jeunesse Sportive de Tiaret) then he moved to JSK and helped them to win the African Champions League in 1990. In 1992, he joined French club AJ Auxerre for an undisclosed fee. In May 1997, Arsenal coach Arsène Wenger tried to buy him along with Swiss center back Murat Yakın in what would have been a "sensational" £7 million deal; however the deal did not succeed and Saib instead joined Spanish club Valencia for £3 million. In 1998, he joined struggling English club Tottenham Hotspur for £2.3 million, thus becoming the first Algerian to play in the Premier League. He helped Tottenham avoid relegation by scoring the sixth goal in their penultimate game of the 1997–98 season against Wimbledon, which ended 6–2.

== International career ==
He played as a midfielder and was captain of the Algerian national team in the early 1990s. the team won the 1990 African Nations Cup.

== Coaching career ==
On 18 August 2007, Saïb was appointed manager of Algerian team JS Kabylie. In June 2008, after steering the team to the Algerian league title, Saïb left to take charge of Saudi Arabian team Al-Watani.

On 27 June 2011, he was appointed as manager of JS Kabylie for a second time. On 1 September 2011, JS Kabylie president Mohand Chérif Hannachi announced that Saïb was relieved from his duties as manager of the club.

== Honours ==
=== As player ===
JS Kabylie

- African Champions League: 1990
- Algerian League: 1990, 2004
- Algerian Cup: 1992
- Algerian Super Cup: 1992

Auxerre

- French League: 1996
- French Cup: 1994, 1996

Lorient

- French Cup: 2002

Tottenham Hotspur

- League Cup: 1999

Al Nassr

- FIFA Club World Championship participation: 2000

International

- African Cup of Nations: 1990
- Afro-Asian Cup of Nations: 1991

Individual

- DZFoot d'Or: 2003
- Algerian Ballon d'Or: 2004

=== As coach ===
JS Kabylie

- Algerian League: 2008
