= Refik Kolić =

- Born: 8 November 1965 (age 60); Bijelo Polje, Montenegro
- Genres: Folk, Pop-folk
- Occupation: Singer
- Labels: Renome

Refik Kolić (Bijelo Polje, 8 November 1965) Is a Bosnian folk music singer who lives and works in Sweden. His famous songs are "Dođi", "Kaja" and "Svadba bosanska" (Bosnian Wedding).
