= Rafik Saïfi =

Algerian footballer (born 1975)

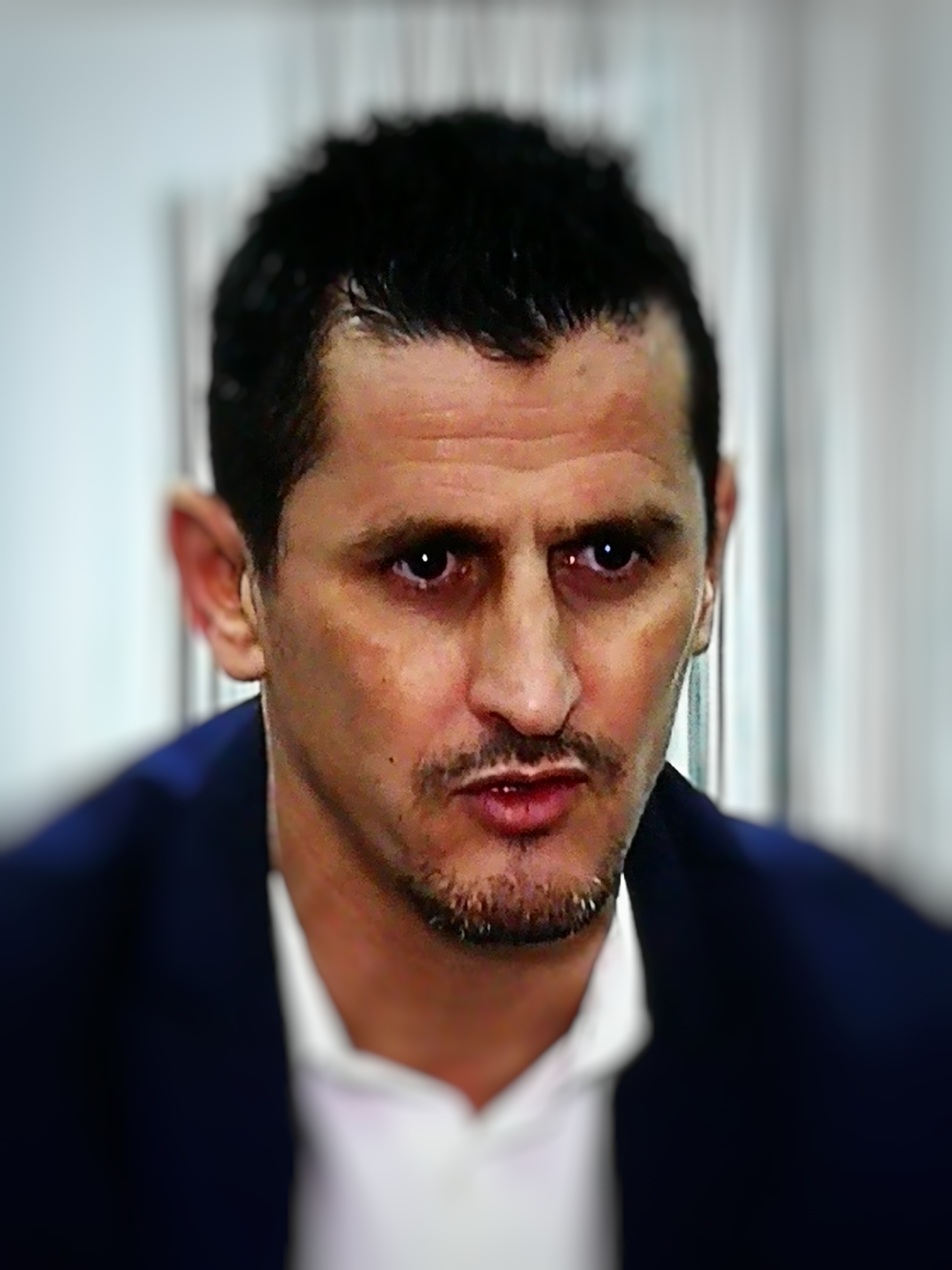

Personal information
- Date of birth: 7 February 1975 (age 51)
- Place of birth: Algiers, Algeria
- Height: 1.78 m (5 ft 10 in)
- Positions: Forward; attacking midfielder

Senior career*
Years	Team	Apps	(Gls)
1993–1994	CM Bordj El Kiffan	18	(31)
1994–1995	IRB Sougueur	18	(27)
1995–1996	IB Khémis El Khechna	18	(19)
1996–1999	MC Alger	29	(20)
1999–2004	Troyes	110	(19)
2004–2005	Istres	35	(4)
2005–2006	Ajaccio	26	(2)
2006–2009	Lorient	95	(26)
2009–2010	Al Khor	10	(2)
2010	→ Istres (loan)	13	(2)
2010–2012	Amiens SC	50	(7)
Total		422	(159)

International career
1998–2010	Algeria	64	(18)

Managerial career
- 2017–2018: MC Alger (assistant)
- 2018–2019: MC Alger
- 2026–: Algeria U23
- * Club domestic league appearances and goals

Rafik Saïfi (Arabic: رفيق صايفي; born 7 February 1975) is an Algerian football coach and former player who is the head coach of the Algeria under-23 national team. A forward and an attacking midfielder, he spent most of his playing career in France. He scored 18 goals in 64 appearances for Algeria national team.

== Club career ==
Saifi began his football career at CM Bordj El Kifane. It was there where he got a name for himself as a goal scorer at the age of 17. He went on to represent two other small teams, IRB Sougueur and IB Khémis El Khechna, before making his big move to MC Alger in his home city. There he helped the team win the Algerian league title before moving to France in 1999 at the age of 24 to join Troyes AC. He stayed with Troyes for five seasons, including the 2003–04 season after their relegation to Ligue 2. (Note: Rafik Saïfi – French league stats at LFP – also available in French (archived))

Moving back into Ligue 1 with a transfer to newly promoted FC Istres in 2004, Saïfi played 35 matches before leaving following the club's relegation. In 2005, he joined AC Ajaccio, also newly promoted, and suffered a third relegation in four years.

Saïfi moved to FC Lorient, yet another newly promoted club, in the summer of 2006. He started the 2007–08 campaign quickly scoring 4 goals in 4 games.

=== Al Khor ===
On 9 August 2009, Saïfi joined Al-Khor on a one-year contract with the club paying a transfer fee of €500,000 to FC Lorient. Saïfi scored his first goal for the club on his league debut in a match against Al-Gharafa on 12 September 2009. On 22 October 2009, he scored his second league goal, this time against Al-Kharitiyath.

=== Istres ===
On 23 January 2010, it was announced that Saïfi would be loaned out to Ligue 2 side FC Istres until the end of the season. The move was made official on 2 February 2010.

On 4 November 2010, Saïfi signed a contract with Amiens SC.

== International career ==
Saïfi made his debut for the Algeria national team on 5 June 1998, in a friendly against Bulgaria, coming on as a substitute in the 65th minute. On 28 February 1999, he scored his first international goal in the 2000 African Cup of Nations qualifier against Liberia which ended as 1–1 draw. He scored his second goal in the following game, a 4–1 win in the return leg against Liberia.

Saïfi was called up by Algeria head coach Nasser Sandjak to the Algerian national team that was taking part in the 2000 African Cup of Nations in Ghana and Nigeria. In the first game against DR Congo, Saïfi started the game and was subbed off in the 70th minute, with the game ending in a goalless draw. In the second group game against Gabon, Saïfi was left out of the starting line-up and was a substitute on the bench but he did take part as he came on in the 77th minute, replacing his Troyes AC teammate Farid Ghazi. Algeria won the game 3–1. He did not take part in the final group game against South Africa. In the quarter-final against Cameroon, Saïfi was left on the bench again but came on in the 51st minute with Algeria losing 2–0. The team managed to pull a goal back in the 90th minute but lost the game 2–1.

Saïfi was a member of the Algeria team that participated in the 2002 African Cup of Nations in Mali and started all three group games against Nigeria, Liberia and hosts Mali. Despite the fact that Algeria failed to make it out of the group stage, Saïfi put in a "best eleven" performance and was included in the team of the tournament.

Saïfi was made his third trip to the African Cup after being included by Algeria manager Rabah Saadane in the team list for the 2010 African Cup of Nations in Angola. He started in Algeria's first game against Malawi, a 3–0 loss, but was subbed off in the 63rd minute by Abdelmalek Ziaya. He started the second game against Mali, a 1–0 win, on the bench and came on in the 80th minute for Abdelkader Ghezzal.

After the FIFA World Cup 2010, he clearly announced through the Tunisian TV channel Nessma, that he was done with his international career.

=== Assault incident ===
After a disappointing campaign by Algeria in the 2010 FIFA World Cup in which the team received much domestic criticism, failing to make it beyond the group stage, a controversial incident occurred at the end of the USA-Algeria game in which the USA secured victory in the last minute. Saïfi spotted journalist Asma Halimi, a female reporter who had written an article criticizing him in the newspaper Competition. Saïfi and the journalist had previously been in a dispute because the journalist had translated and published an interview Saïfi had given. He slapped her across the face; Halimi responded by striking him back in the face, catching her nail on his lip. Halimi stated she would file a complaint against Saïfi with governing body FIFA and the Algerian FA.

== Post-playing career ==
Saïfi worked for beIN Channels Network as a sports analyst. He was an assistant coach and then interim manager for MC Alger between 2017 and 2019.

He was appointed head coach of the Algeria under-23 national team in March 2026 in preparation for the 2028 Summer Olympics.

== Career statistics ==
=== International ===
Appearances and goals by national team and year
National team	Year	Apps	Goals
Algeria	1998	3	0
Algeria	1999	5	2
Algeria	2000	10	4
Algeria	2001	5	3
Algeria	2002	3	0
Algeria	2003	3	0
Algeria	2004	3	0
Algeria	2005	4	2
Algeria	2006	2	1
Algeria	2007	7	3
Algeria	2008	5	1
Algeria	2009	7	2
Algeria	2010	7	0
Total		64	18

Scores and results list Algeria's goal tally first, score column indicates score after each Saïfi goal.

List of international goals scored by Rafik Saïfi
No.	Date	Venue	Opponent	Score	Result	Competition
1	28 February 1999	Samuel Kanyon Doe Sports Complex, Monrovia, Liberia	Liberia	1–0	1–1	2000 African Cup of Nations qualification
2	9 April 1999	Stade 19 Mai 1956, Annaba, Algeria	Liberia	3–0	4–1	2000 African Cup of Nations qualification
3	3 June 2000	Stade 19 Mai 1956, Annaba, Algeria	Guinea	1–0	4–0	Friendly
4	3 June 2000	Stade 19 Mai 1956, Annaba, Algeria	Guinea	2–0	4–0	Friendly
5	16 June 2000	Stade 19 Mai 1956, Annaba, Algeria	Senegal	1–1	1–1	2002 FIFA World Cup qualification
6	11 October 2000	Stade 19 Mai 1956, Annaba, Algeria	Cape Verde	2–0	2–0	2002 FIFA World Cup qualification
7	1 June 2001	Stade 19 Mai 1956, Annaba, Algeria	Angola	1–0	3–2	2002 African Cup of Nations qualification
8	1 June 2001	Stade 19 Mai 1956, Annaba, Algeria	Angola	2–1	3–2	2002 African Cup of Nations qualification
9	6 December 2001	Stade 5 Juillet 1962, Algiers, Algeria	Ghana	1–1	1–1	Friendly
10	9 February 2005	Stade 5 Juillet 1962, Algiers, Algeria	Burkina Faso	1–0	3–0	Friendly
11	9 February 2005	Stade 5 Juillet 1962, Algiers, Algeria	Burkina Faso	2–0	3–0	Friendly
12	11 November 2006	Luynes, Aix-en-Provence, France	Burkina Faso	1–2	1–2	Friendly
13	7 February 2007	Stade 5 Juillet 1962, Algiers, Algeria	Libya	1–1	2–1	Friendly
14	2 June 2007	Estádio da Várzea, Praia, Cape Verde	Cape Verde	2–1	2–2	2008 African Cup of Nations qualification
15	9 September 2007	Independence Stadium, Bakau, Gambia	Gambia	1–0	1–2	2008 African Cup of Nations qualification
16	5 September 2008	Stade Mustapha Tchaker, Blida, Algeria	Senegal	2–1	3–2	2010 FIFA World Cup qualification (CAF)
17	20 June 2009	Independence Stadium, Chililabombwe, Zambia	Zambia	2–0	2–0	2010 FIFA World Cup qualification (CAF)
18	6 September 2009	Stade Mustapha Tchaker, Blida, Algeria	Zambia	1–0	1–0	2010 FIFA World Cup qualification (CAF)

== Honours ==
MC Alger

- Algerian Championnat National: 1998–99

Troyes

- UEFA Intertoto Cup: 2001

Amiens

- Championnat National runner-up: 2010–11

Individual

- DZFoot d'Or: 2007, 2008
- Algerian Ballon d’Or (Ballon d’Or El Haddaf): 2008
- Africa Cup of Nations Team of the Tournament: 2002
