= 2011–12 Espérance Sportive de Tunis season =

Espérance Sportive de Tunis
2011–12 season
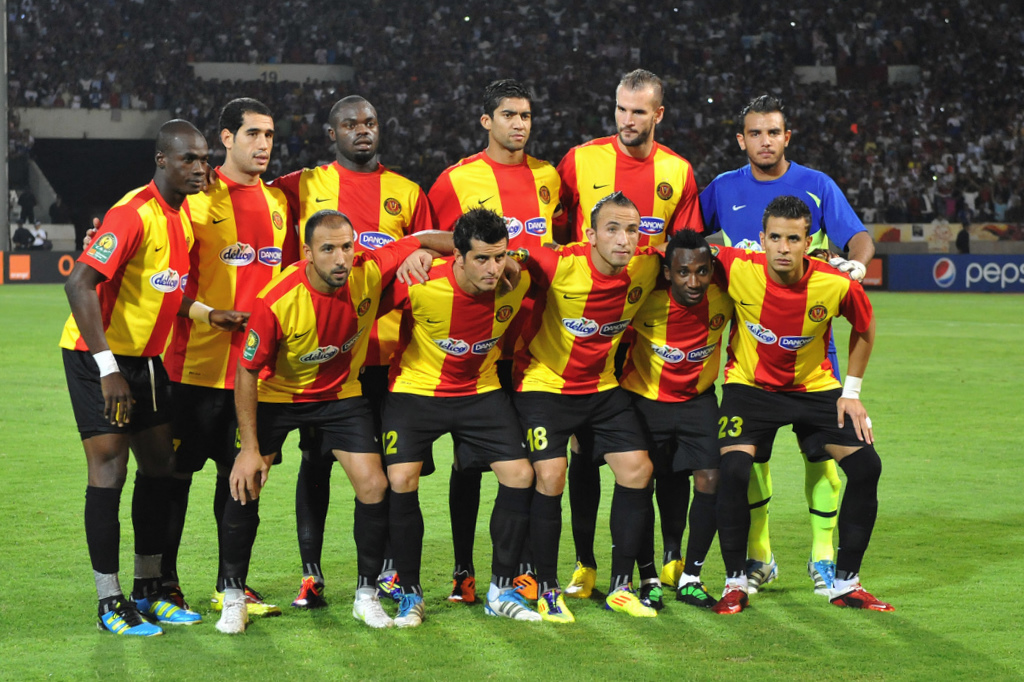
- 2011 CAF Champions League Final
- President: Hamdi Meddeb
- Head coach: Nabil Maâloul (until 5 January 2012); Michel Decastel (from 7 January 2012)
- Stadium: Stade de Radès
- Ligue 1: Winners
- Tunisian Cup: Semi-final
- Champions League: 2011: Winners; 2012: Second round
- Club World Cup: Sixth place
- CAF Super Cup: Runners–up
- Top goalscorer: League: Youssef Msakni (17 goals); All: Yannick N'Djeng (22 goals); Youssef Msakni (22 goals)

In the 2011–12 season, Espérance Sportive de Tunis competed in the Ligue 1 for the 58th season, as well as the Tunisian Cup. It was their 58th consecutive season in the top flight of Tunisian football. They competed in Ligue 1, the Champions League, the FIFA Club World Cup and the CAF Super Cup.

== Squad list ==
Players and squad numbers last updated on 18 November 2011.
Note: Flags indicate national team as has been defined under FIFA eligibility rules. Players may hold more than one non-FIFA nationality.

No.	Nat.	Position	Name	Date of birth (age)	Signed from
Goalkeepers
1	(Tunisia)	GK	Moez Ben Cherifia	24 June 1991 (aged 20)	(Tunisia) Youth system
22	(Tunisia)	GK	Wassim Naouara	26 January 1986 (aged 25)	(Tunisia) CS Korba
Defenders
3	(Cameroon)	CB	Banana Yaya	29 July 1991 (aged 20)	(Cameroon) Achille FC
5	(Tunisia)	RB	Aymen Ben Amor	7 September 1985 (aged 26)	(Tunisia) CS Sfaxien
6	(Mali)	CB	Idrissa Coulibaly	19 December 1987 (aged 24)	(Libya) Al Ahli SC
12	(Tunisia)	CB	Khalil Chemmam	24 July 1987 (aged 24)	(Tunisia) Youth system
17	(Tunisia)	RB	Sameh Derbali	23 November 1986 (aged 25)	(Tunisia) Olympique Béja
20	(Tunisia)	CB	Mohamed Ben Mansour	19 July 1988 (aged 23)	(Tunisia) Youth system
25	(Tunisia)	CB	Mohamed Bachtobji	1 April 1980 (aged 31)	(Tunisia) Club Africain
25	(Tunisia)	CB	Seifallah Hosni	11 October 1985 (aged 26)	(Tunisia) Stade tunisien
26	(Ghana)	RB	Harrison Afful	24 June 1986 (aged 25)	(Ghana) Asante Kotoko
29	(Tunisia)	CB	Walid Hichri	5 March 1986 (aged 25)	(Tunisia) CA Bizertin
Midfielders
4	(Tunisia)	DM	Hocine Ragued	11 February 1983 (aged 28)	(Turkey) Kardemir Karabükspor
10	(Tunisia)	AM	Oussama Darragi	3 April 1987 (aged 24)	(Tunisia) Youth system
10	(Tunisia)	AM	Hamza Baghouli	3 April 1988 (aged 23)	(Tunisia) CA Bizertin
13	(Tunisia)	DM	Karim Aouadhi	2 May 1986 (aged 25)	(Germany) Fortuna Düsseldorf
18	(Tunisia)	LW	Wajdi Bouazzi	16 August 1985 (aged 26)	(Tunisia) AS Kasserine
19	(Tunisia)	DM	Khaled Mouelhi	13 February 1981 (aged 30)	(Norway) Lillestrøm SK
21	(Tunisia)	CM	Mejdi Traoui	13 December 1983 (aged 28)	(Austria) Red Bull Salzburg
23	(Tunisia)	DM	Khaled Korbi	16 December 1985 (aged 26)	(Tunisia) Stade Tunisien
24	(Tunisia)	CM	Oussama Boughanmi	5 January 1990 (aged 21)	(France) EA Guingamp
27	(Tunisia)	CM	Safouane Ben Salem	26 February 1992 (aged 19)	(Tunisia) Youth system
28	(Tunisia)	LW	Youssef Msakni	28 October 1990 (aged 21)	(Tunisia) Stade tunisien
30	(Tunisia)	AM	Iheb Msakni	18 July 1987 (aged 24)	(Tunisia) Stade tunisien
31	(Algeria)	LW	Youcef Belaïli	14 March 1992 (aged 19)	(Algeria) MC Oran
Forwards
7	(Tunisia)	FW	Khaled Ayari	17 January 1990 (aged 21)	(Tunisia) AS Ariana
8	(Tunisia)	AM	Idriss Mhirsi	21 February 1994 (aged 17)	(Tunisia) Youth system
11	(Tunisia)	FW	Taha Yassine Khenissi	6 January 1992 (aged 19)	(Tunisia) ES Zarzis
14	(Tunisia)	FW	Mohamed Ali Slama	9 September 1988 (aged 23)	(Tunisia) ES Zarzis
15	(Cameroon)	FW	Yannick N'Djeng	11 March 1990 (aged 21)	(Algeria) JSM Béjaïa
	(Ivory Coast)	LW	Didier Lebri	13 August 1983 (aged 28)	(Tunisia) AS Marsa
23	(Ghana)	FW	Emmanuel Atukwei Clottey	30 August 1987 (aged 24)	(Ghana) Berekum Chelsea
	(France)	ST	Jean-David Beauguel	21 March 1992 (aged 19)	(France) Toulouse FC

== Competitions ==
=== Overview ===
Competition	Record								Started round	Final position / round	First match	Last match
Competition	G	W	D	L	GF	GA	GD	Win %	Started round	Final position / round	First match	Last match
Ligue 1	30	22	3	5	61	22	+39	73.33	—N/a	Winners	15 November 2011	17 May 2012
Tunisian Cup	4	2	2	0	6	1	+5	50.00	Round of 32	Semi-finals	20 June 2013	29 June 2013
CAF Super Cup	1	0	1	0	1	1	+0	0.00	Final	Runners–up	25 February 2012	
2011 Champions League	10	5	5	0	13	4	+9	50.00	Group stage	Winners	16 July 2011	12 November 2011
2012 Champions League	4	2	2	0	11	3	+8	50.00	First round	Second round	24 March 2012	13 May 2012
FIFA Club World Cup	2	0	0	2	3	5	−2	0.00	Quarter-finals	Fifth place	11 December 2011	14 December 2011
Total	51	31	13	7	95	36	+59	60.78				

Updated to match played 3 June 2019
Source: Competitions

== League table ==
Pos	Team	Pld	W	D	L	GF	GA	GD	Pts	Qualification or relegation
1	Espérance de Tunis	30	22	3	5	61	22	+39	69	Qualification for Champions League
2	CA Bizertin	30	20	5	5	54	25	+29	65	Qualification for Champions League
3	CS Sfaxien	30	15	11	4	47	26	+21	56	Qualification for Confederation Cup
4	Etoile du Sahel	30	13	10	7	33	22	+11	49	Qualification for Confederation Cup
5	AS Marsa	30	12	11	7	39	28	+11	47	

Source: Ligue 1
Rules for classification: 1) points; 2) head-to-head points; 3) head-to-head goal difference; 4) goal difference; 5) total goals; 6) fairplay ranking; 7) playoff.

=== Results summary ===
Overall								Home						Away					
Pld	W	D	L	GF	GA	GD	Pts	W	D	L	GF	GA	GD	W	D	L	GF	GA	GD
30	22	3	5	61	22	+39	69	14	0	1	38	6	+32	8	3	4	23	16	+7

Last updated: 22 April 2018.
Source: Competitive matches

=== Results by round ===
Round	1	2	3	4	5	6	7	8	9	10	11	12	13	14	15	16	17	18	19	20	21	22	23	24	25	26	27	28	29	30
Ground	A	H	A	H	A	H	A	H	A	H	A	H	A	A	H	H	A	H	A	H	A	H	A	H	A	H	A	H	H	A
Result	D	W	L	W	W	W	W	W	W	W	W	W	W	W	W	W	D	L	D	W	L	W	W	W	L	W	W	W	W	L
Position	8	5	8	6	5	3	3	2	2	2	2	1	1	1	1	1	1	1	1	1	1	1	1	1	1	1	1	1	1	1

Source: Competitive matches
A = Away; H = Home; W = Win; D = Draw; L = Loss

=== Matches ===
Win Draw Loss

16 November 2011 Round 1	EGS Gafsa	1–1	Espérance de Tunis	Gafsa
14:30	Adriano 80' (pen.)	Soccerway report	N'Djeng 61'	Stadium: Stade du 7 Novembre de Gafsa; Referee: Nasrallah Jaouadi

20 November 2011 Round 2	Espérance de Tunis	3–0	US Monastir	Tunis
14:30	Ayari 59'; Y. Msakni 70'; N'Djeng 82'	Soccerway report		Stadium: Stade El Menzah; Referee: Hichem Barkallah

27 November 2011 Round 3	CA Bizertin	2–1	Espérance de Tunis	Bizerte
14:30	Harbaoui 48'; Hadhria 70' (pen.)	Soccerway report	Y. Msakni 21'	Stadium: Stade 15 Octobre; Referee: Slim Belkhaouas

11 February 2012 Round 4	Espérance de Tunis	5–0	ES Zarzis	Tunis
14:00	N'Djeng 4', 49', 86'; Y. Msakni 9', 62'	Soccerway report		Stadium: Stade El Menzah; Referee: Mourad Ben Hamza

15 February 2012 Round 5	ES Beni-Khalled	0–1	Espérance de Tunis	Tunis
14:00		Soccerway report	Bouazzi 90'	Stadium: Stade El Menzah; Referee: Ghazi Ben Ghezaïel

19 February 2012 Round 6	Espérance de Tunis	1–0	CS Sfaxien	Tunis
14:00	I. Msakni 72'	Soccerway report		Stadium: Stade Olympique de Radès; Referee: Yosr Saâdallah

4 March 2012 Round 7	ES Hammam-Sousse	0–2	Espérance de Tunis	Hammam Sousse
14:00		Soccerway report	Traoui 9'; Y. Msakni 90+4' (pen.)	Stadium: Stade Municipal Bou Ali-Lahouar; Referee: Mohamed Ben Hassana

7 March 2012 Round 8	Espérance de Tunis	1–0	Etoile du Sahel	Tunis
14:00	N'Djeng 45+3'	Soccerway report		Stadium: Stade Olympique de Radès; Referee: Slim Jedidi

11 March 2012 Round 9	Espérance de Tunis	3–1	Olympique Béja	Tunis
14:00	N'Djeng 51', 52'; Y. Msakni 90'	Soccerway report	Melki 49'	Stadium: Stade El Menzah; Referee: Mohamed Meddeb

14 March 2012 Round 10	JS Kairouan	0–2	Espérance de Tunis	Kairouan
14:00		Soccerway report	Y. Msakni 16'; Coulibaly 19'	Stadium: Stade Hamda Laouani; Referee: Foued Bahri

18 March 2012 Round 11	CS Hammam-Lif	0–2	Espérance de Tunis	Tunis
14:00		Soccerway report	N'Djeng 38'; Bouazzi 62'	Stadium: Stade Bou Kornine; Referee: Slim Belkhaouas

29 March 2012 Round 12	Espérance de Tunis	1–0	AS Marsa	Tunis
14:00	Mouelhi 90+1' (pen.)	Soccerway report		Stadium: Stade Olympique de Radès; Referee: Yassine Harrouche

22 April 2012 Round 13	AS Gabès	0–2	Espérance de Tunis	Gabès
15:30		Soccerway report	Aouadhi 67' (pen.); N'Djeng 88'	Stadium: Stade du Zrig; Referee: Issam Rahmouni

11 April 2012 Round 14	Club Africain	1–2	Espérance de Tunis	Tunis
16:30	N'Douassel 41'	Soccerway report	Y. Msakni 71'; Aouadhi 80'	Stadium: Stade El Menzah; Referee: Foued Bahri

15 April 2012 Round 15	Espérance de Tunis	2–1	Stade tunisien	Tunis
15:30	Y. Msakni 15'; Chemmam 34'	Soccerway report	Ben Ammar 60'	Stadium: Stade El Menzah; Referee: Nabil Aguir

2 May 2012 Round 16	Espérance de Tunis	1–0	EGS Gafsa	Tunis
16:00	Y. Msakni 49'	Soccerway report		Stadium: Stade El Menzah; Referee: Abdelhamid Hachfi

6 May 2012 Round 17	US Monastir	1–1	Espérance de Tunis	Monastir
16:00	Touka 60'	Soccerway report	Chemmam 71'	Stadium: Stade Mustapha Ben Jannet; Referee: Slim Jedidi

17 May 2012 Round 19	ES Zarzis	2–2	Espérance de Tunis	Zarzis
16:00	Ameur 22' (pen.); Al Idrissy 49' (pen.)	Soccerway report	Y. Msakni 75'; Mouelhi 90+4' (pen.)	Stadium: Stade Jlidi; Referee: Elyès Souiden

23 May 2012 Round 21	CS Sfaxien	2–1	Espérance de Tunis	Sfax
16:00	Hammami 35' (pen.); Haddad 38'	Soccerway report	Aouadhi 40'	Stadium: Stade Taïeb Mhiri; Referee: Slim Jedidi

27 May 2012 Round 18	Espérance de Tunis	0–1	CA Bizertin	Tunis
16:00		Soccerway report	Baratli 74' (pen.)	Stadium: Stade El Menzah; Referee: Mohamed Ben Hassana

20 June 2012 Round 25	Espérance de Tunis	2–0	JS Kairouan	Tunis
18:00	Mouelhi 16' (pen.); Mhirsi 32'	Soccerway report		Stadium: Stade El Menzah; Referee: Mourad Ben Hamza

24 June 2012 Round 23	Etoile du Sahel	0–2	Espérance de Tunis	Sousse
19:00		Soccerway report	Chemmam 73'; Aouadhi 88'	Stadium: Stade Olympique de Sousse; Referee: Foued Bahri

29 June 2012 Round 22	Espérance de Tunis	7–0	ES Hammam-Sousse	Tunis
19:00	Y. Msakni 36'; Derbali 38'; Bouazzi 41'; N'Djeng 52', 85'; Hichri 70'; Baghouli 81'	Soccerway report		Stadium: Stade Olympique de Radès; Referee: Maher Harrabi

22 August 2012 Round 20	Espérance de Tunis	1–0	ES Beni-Khalled	Tunis
18:30	Lebri 64'	Soccerway report		Stadium: Stade Chedly Zouiten; Referee: Abdelhamid Hachfi

26 August 2012 Round 24	Olympique Béja	3–1	Espérance de Tunis	Béja
17:00	Kéthiri 17'; Abbès 22'; Traoré 33'	Soccerway report	Mouelhi 76' (pen.)	Stadium: Stade Boujemâa Lekmiti; Referee: Mohamed Said Kordi

11 September 2012 Round 26	Espérance de Tunis	4–0	CS Hammam-Lif	Tunis
18:00	Y. Msakni 7'; Zouaghi 52'; N'Djeng 60'; Mhirsi 64'	Soccerway report		Stadium: Stade El Menzah; Referee: Anis Ben Hassen

19 September 2012 Round 27	AS Marsa	1–2	Espérance de Tunis	Tunis
16:30	Jebali 70'	Soccerway report	Y. Msakni 13'; N'Djeng 71'	Stadium: Stade Abdelaziz Chtioui; Referee: Maher Harrabi

23 September 2012 Round 28	Espérance de Tunis	4–1	AS Gabès	Tunis
16:00	I. Msakni 21'; Y. Msakni 45+3' (pen.), 47', 49'	Soccerway report	Pangwoh 52'	Stadium: Stade El Menzah; Referee: Adel Sghaier

26 September 2012 Round 29	Espérance de Tunis	3–2	Club Africain	Tunis
16:00	I. Msakni 11', 39'; N'Djeng 57'	Soccerway report	Zitouni 14'; Jaziri 90+4'	Stadium: Stade Olympique de Radès; Referee: Youssef Sraïri

30 September 2012 Round 30	Stade tunisien	3–1	Espérance de Tunis	Tunis
16:00	Orok 42'; Ben Salem 76'; Kouassi 87'	Soccerway report	Hichri 90+3'	Stadium: Stade Olympique de Radès; Referee: Mourad Ben Hamza

== Tunisian Cup ==
20 June 2013 Round of 32	CA Bizertin	0–3	Espérance de Tunis	Bizerte
14:00			Akaichi 63', 74', 76'	Stadium: Stade 15 Octobre

23 June 2013 Round of 16	Espérance de Tunis	2–0	El Ahly Mateur
14:00

26 June 2013 Quarter-finals	Espérance de Tunis	0–0 (a.e.t.) (3–1 p)	ES Métlaoui	Tunis
14:00				Stadium: Stade El Menzah
	Penalties
	Youcef Belaïli (penalty scored); Chamseddine Samti (penalty scored); Mohamed Ben Mansour (penalty scored); Hocine Ragued (penalty missed)		(penalty scored) ? (penalty missed) ? (penalty missed) ? (penalty missed) ?

29 June 2013 Semi-finals	CS Sfaxien	1–1 (a.e.t.) (4–3 p)	Espérance de Tunis	Sfax
14:00	Kouyaté 60'		Ben Mansour 48'	Stadium: Stade Taïeb Mhiri; Referee: Lotfi Cherif
	Penalties
	Ali Maaloul (penalty scored); Houssem Louati (penalty scored); Didier Ndong (penalty missed); Ferjani Sassi (penalty scored); Rami Jridi (penalty scored)		(penalty scored) Chamseddine Dhaouadi; (penalty scored) Mohamed Ben Mansour; (penalty missed) Sameh Derbali; (penalty scored) Iheb Msakni; (penalty missed) Youcef Belaïli

== 2011 Champions League ==
=== Group stage ===
==== Group B ====
Pos	Team	Pld	W	D	L	GF	GA	GD	Pts	Qualification
1	(Tunisia) Espérance ST	6	2	4	0	9	4	+5	10	Advance to knockout stage
2	(Morocco) Wydad AC	6	1	4	1	11	9	+2	7 (Note: Wydad AC and Al-Ahly are ranked by their head-to-head records (decided by away goals).)	Advance to knockout stage
3	(Egypt) Al-Ahly	6	1	4	1	7	6	+1	7	
4	(Algeria) MC Alger	6	1	2	3	4	12	−8	5	

Source: CAF
Notes:

16 July 2011 Matchday 1	MC Alger (Algeria)	1–1	(Tunisia) Espérance de Tunis	Algiers
18:30 UTC+01:00	Mohamed Megherbi 17'	Report	Oussama Darragi 7'	Stadium: Stade 5 Juillet 1962; Referee: Daniel Bennett (South Africa)

30 July 2011 Matchday 2	Espérance de Tunis (Tunisia)	1–0	(Egypt) Al-Ahly	Tunis
21:30 UTC+01:00	Yannick N'Djeng 14'	Report		Stadium: Olympic Stadium

14 August 2011 Matchday 3	Wydad Casablanca (Morocco)	2–2	(Tunisia) Espérance de Tunis	Casablanca
22:00 UTC±00:00	Fabrice N'Guessi 65'; Youssef Kaddioui 78' (pen.)	Report	Wajdi Bouazzi 22'; Walid Hichri 37'	Stadium: Stade Mohamed V Attendance: 67,000

27 August 2011 Matchday 4	Espérance de Tunis (Tunisia)	0–0	(Morocco) Wydad Casablanca	Tunis
22:00 UTC+01:00		Report		Stadium: Stade El Menzah

10 September 2011 Matchday 5	Espérance de Tunis (Tunisia)	4–0	(Algeria) MC Alger	Tunis
19:10 UTC+01:00	Mejdi Traoui 8'; Yannick N'Djeng 21', 43', 55'	Report		Stadium: Stade El Menzah

16 September 2011 Matchday 6	Al-Ahly (Egypt)	1–1	(Tunisia) Espérance de Tunis	Cairo
20:00 UTC+02:00	Mohamed Aboutrika 54'	Report	Banana Yaya 17'	Stadium: Cairo International Stadium

=== knockout stage ===
==== Semi-finals ====
2 October 2011	Al-Hilal (Sudan)	0–1	(Tunisia) Espérance de Tunis	Omdurman
20:00 UTC+03:00		Report	Youssef Msakni 4'	Stadium: Al-Hilal Stadium

15 October 2011	Espérance de Tunis (Tunisia)	2–0	(Sudan) Al-Hilal	Tunis
19:30 UTC+01:00	Youssef Msakni 52'; Wajdi Bouazzi 90'	Report		Stadium: Olympic Stadium

==== Final ====
6 November 2011	Wydad Casablanca (Morocco)	0–0	(Tunisia) Espérance de Tunis	Casablanca
20:00 UTC±00:00		Report		Stadium: Stade Mohammed V Attendance: 70,000; Referee: Neant Alioum (Cameroon)

12 November 2011	Espérance de Tunis (Tunisia)	1–0	(Morocco) Wydad Casablanca	Tunis
18:00 UTC+01:00	Afful 21'	Report		Stadium: Olympic Stadium; Attendance: 60,000; Referee: Noumandiez Doué (Ivory Coast)

== CAF Super Cup ==
25 February 2012	Espérance de Tunis (Tunisia)	1–1 (3–4 p)	(Morocco) Maghreb de Fès	Tunis
15:00 UTC+01:00	Chemmam 90+10'	Report	Abourazzouk 20'	Stadium: Stade Olympique de Radès; Referee: Daniel Bennett (South Africa)
	Penalties
	Mouelhi (penalty scored); Derbali (penalty missed); I. Msakni (penalty scored); Hichri (penalty missed); Y. Msakni (penalty scored)		(penalty scored) Escher; (penalty scored) El Basri; (penalty missed) Zekroumi; (penalty scored) Dahmani; (penalty scored) Diop

== FIFA Club World Cup ==
11 December 2011 Quarter-finals	Espérance de Tunis (Tunisia)	1–2	(Qatar) Al-Sadd	Toyota
16:00	Darragi 60'	Report	Khalfan 33'; Koni 49'	Stadium: Toyota Stadium; Attendance: 21,251; Referee: Enrique Osses (Chile)

14 December 2011 Match for fifth place	Monterrey (Mexico)	3–2	(Tunisia) Espérance de Tunis	Toyota
16:30	Mier 39'; De Nigris 44'; Zavala 47'	Report	N'Djeng 31'; Mouelhi 76' (pen.)	Stadium: Toyota Stadium; Attendance: 13,639; Referee: Ravshan Irmatov (Uzbekistan)

== 2012 Champions League ==
=== First round ===
24 March 2012	Brikama United (The Gambia)	1–1	(Tunisia) Espérance de Tunis	Brikama
16:30 UTC±00:00	Bojang 12'	Report	Bouazzi 4'	Stadium: Box Bar Mini Stadium; Referee: Ali Lemghaifry (Mauritania)

6 April 2012	Espérance de Tunis (Tunisia)	3–1	(The Gambia) Brikama United	Tunis
16:00 UTC+01:00	Bouazzi 40'; Y. Msakni 45'; Aouadhi 72'	Report	Sawo 25'	Stadium: Stade Olympique de Radès; Referee: Denis Dembele (Ivory Coast)

=== Second round ===
28 April 2012	Espérance de Tunis (Tunisia)	6–0	(Zimbabwe) Dynamos	Tunis
16:00 UTC+01:00	Hichri 8'; Aouadhi 14'; Y. Msakni 38', 90+3'; N'Djeng 77'; I. Msakni 84'	Report		Stadium: Stade Olympique de Radès; Referee: Yakhouba Keita (Guinea)

13 May 2012	Dynamos (Zimbabwe)	1–1	(Tunisia) Espérance de Tunis	Harare
15:00 UTC+02:00	Mukamba 83'	Report	Ayari 48'	Stadium: Rufaro Stadium; Referee: Khalid Abdel Rahman (Sudan)

== Squad information ==
=== Playing statistics ===
No.	Pos	Nat	Player	Total		Ligue 1		Tunisian Cup		Champions League		Other (Note: Includes the CAF Super Cup and FIFA Club World Cup)	
No.	Pos	Nat	Player	Apps	Goals	Apps	Goals	Apps	Goals	Apps	Goals	Apps	Goals
Goalkeepers
1	GK	(Tunisia) TUN	Moez Ben Cherifia	47	0	30	0	0	0	14	0	3	0
22	GK	(Tunisia) TUN	Wassim Naouara	1	0	1	0	0	0	0	0	0	0
Defenders
5	DF	(Tunisia) TUN	Aymen Ben Amor	7	0	5	0	0	0	2	0	0	0
6	DF	(Mali) MLI	Idrissa Coulibaly	26	1	14	1	0	0	9	0	3	0
12	DF	(Tunisia) TUN	Khalil Chemmam	35	4	22	3	0	0	10	0	3	1
17	DF	(Tunisia) TUN	Sameh Derbali	39	1	28	1	0	0	10	0	1	0
20	DF	(Tunisia) TUN	Mohamed Ben Mansour	24	0	19	0	0	0	4	0	1	0
25	DF	(Tunisia) TUN	Mohamed Bachtobji	0	0	0	0	0	0	0	0	0	0
26	DF	(Ghana) GHA	Harrison Afful	30	1	16	0	0	0	12	1	2	0
29	DF	(Tunisia) TUN	Walid Hichri	45	4	28	2	0	0	14	2	3	0
	DF	(Tunisia) TUN	Seifallah Hosni	0	0	0	0	0	0	0	0	0	0
Midfielders
10	MF	(Tunisia) TUN	Hamza Baghouli	2	1	2	1	0	0	0	0	0	0
13	MF	(Tunisia) TUN	Karim Aouadhi	28	6	23	4	0	0	4	2	1	0
18	MF	(Tunisia) TUN	Wajdi Bouazzi	45	7	28	3	0	0	14	4	3	0
19	MF	(Tunisia) TUN	Khaled Mouelhi	36	5	23	4	0	0	10	0	3	1
21	MF	(Tunisia) TUN	Mejdi Traoui	36	2	23	1	0	0	10	1	3	0
24	MF	(Tunisia) TUN	Oussama Boughanmi	5	0	4	0	0	0	1	0	0	0
27	MF	(Tunisia) TUN	Safouane Ben Salem	4	0	3	0	0	0	1	0	0	0
28	MF	(Tunisia) TUN	Youssef Msakni	41	22	28	17	0	0	10	5	3	0
30	MF	(Tunisia) TUN	Iheb Msakni	26	5	21	4	0	0	4	1	1	0
31	MF	(Algeria) ALG	Youcef Belaïli	3	0	3	0	0	0	0	0	0	0
	MF	(Tunisia) TUN	Hocine Ragued	7	0	7	0	0	0	0	0	0	0
	MF	(Tunisia) TUN	Khaled Korbi	23	0	12	0	0	0	11	0	0	0
	MF	(Tunisia) TUN	Zine El Abidine Souissi	4	0	2	0	0	0	2	0	0	0
Forwards
7	FW	(Tunisia) TUN	Khaled Ayari	23	2	12	1	0	0	9	1	2	0
8	FW	(Tunisia) TUN	Idriss Mhirsi	15	2	12	2	0	0	2	0	1	0
11	FW	(Tunisia) TUN	Taha Yassine Khenissi	1	0	1	0	0	0	0	0	0	0
14	FW	(Tunisia) TUN	Mohamed Ali Slama	14	0	7	0	0	0	7	0	0	0
15	FW	(Cameroon) CMR	Yannick N'Djeng	43	21	26	15	0	0	14	5	3	1
	FW	(Ivory Coast) CIV	Didier Lebri	2	1	2	1	0	0	0	0	0	0
	FW	(Ghana) GHA	Emmanuel Atukwei Clottey	1	0	1	0	0	0	0	0	0	0
	FW	(France) FRA	Jean David Beauguel	0	0	0	0	0	0	0	0	0	0
Players transferred out during the season
3	DF	(Cameroon) CMR	Banana Yaya	14	1	3	0	0	0	9	1	2	0
10	MF	(Tunisia) TUN	Oussama Darragi	12	2	2	0	0	0	8	1	2	1

Last updated: 8 June 2019
Source: fr.soccerway.com

=== Goalscorers ===
Includes all competitive matches. The list is sorted alphabetically by surname when total goals are equal.

No.	Nat.	Player	Pos.	L 1	TC	CL 1	CAF Super Cup	Club World Cup	TOTAL
28	(Tunisia)	Youssef Msakni	FW	17	0	5	0	0	22
15	(Cameroon)	Yannick N'Djeng	FW	16	0	5	0	1	22
18	(Tunisia)	Wajdi Bouazzi	MF	3	0	4	0	0	7
13	(Tunisia)	Karim Aouadhi	MF	4	0	2	0	0	6
19	(Tunisia)	Khaled Mouelhi	MF	4	0	0	0	1	5
30	(Tunisia)	Iheb Msakni	MF	4	0	1	0	0	5
12	(Tunisia)	Khalil Chemmam	DF	3	0	0	1	0	4
29	(Tunisia)	Walid Hichri	DF	2	0	2	0	0	4
8	(Tunisia)	Idriss Mhirsi	FW	2	0	0	0	0	2
7	(Tunisia)	Khaled Ayari	FW	1	0	1	0	0	2
21	(Tunisia)	Mejdi Traoui	MF	1	0	1	0	0	2
10	(Tunisia)	Oussama Darragi	MF	0	0	1	0	1	2
	(Ivory Coast)	Didier Lebri	FW	1	0	0	0	0	1
10	(Tunisia)	Hamza Baghouli	MF	1	0	0	0	0	1
6	(Mali)	Idrissa Coulibaly	DF	1	0	0	0	0	1
17	(Tunisia)	Sameh Derbali	DF	1	0	0	0	0	1
26	(Ghana)	Harrison Afful	DF	0	0	1	0	0	1
3	(Cameroon)	Banana Yaya	DF	0	0	1	0	0	1
Own Goals				0	0	0	0	0	0
Totals				61	6	24	1	3	95

== Transfers ==
=== In ===
Date	Pos	Player	From club	Transfer fee	Source
9 June 2011	FW	(Tunisia) Mohamed Ali Slama	ES Zarzis	240,000 DT	
9 July 2011	FW	(Cameroon) Yannick N'Djeng	(Algeria) JSM Béjaïa	€700,000	
7 August 2011	DF	(Mali) Idrissa Coulibaly	(Libya) Al Ahli SC	Free transfer	
27 December 2011	MF	(Tunisia) Karim Aouadhi	(Germany) Fortuna Düsseldorf	Free transfer	
1 January 2012	MF	(Tunisia) Iheb Msakni	Stade tunisien	Free transfer	

=== Out ===
Date	Pos	Player	To club	Transfer fee	Source
19 January 2012	DF	(Cameroon) Yaya Banana	(France) FC Sochaux	Free transfer	
21 February 2012	MF	(Tunisia) Oussama Darragi	(Switzerland) FC Sion	Free transfer	
