= 2012 CAF Super Cup =

Espérance ST	Maghreb de Fès
(Tunisia)	(Morocco)
1	1
- Maghreb de Fès won 4–3 on penalties
- Date: 25 February 2012
- Venue: Stade Olympique, Tunis
- Referee: Daniel Bennett (South Africa)

The 2012 CAF Super Cup (also known as the 2012 Orange CAF Super Cup for sponsorship reasons) was the 20th CAF Super Cup, an annual football match in Africa organized by the Confederation of African Football (CAF), between the winners of the previous season's two CAF club competitions, the CAF Champions League and the CAF Confederation Cup.

The match was played between Espérance ST from Tunisia, the winner of the 2011 CAF Champions League and Maghreb de Fès from Morocco, the winner of the 2011 CAF Confederation Cup. Maghreb de Fès won 4–3 on penalties after the match finished in a 1–1 draw. Maghreb de Fès becomes the only team in CAF Super Cup to win it after they qualified throw CAF Considerations Cup

== Teams ==
Team	Qualification	Previous participation (bold indicates winners)
(Tunisia) Espérance ST	2011 CAF Champions League winner	**1995**, 1999
(Morocco) Maghreb de Fès	2011 CAF Confederation Cup winner	None

== Rules ==
The CAF Super Cup is played over one match, hosted by the winner of the CAF Champions League. Since 2011, the regulations have been changed such that in case of a draw the two teams would directly move to post match penalties (no extra time is played).

== Match details ==
25 February 2012
15:00 UTC+01:00

Espérance ST (Tunisia)	1–1	(Morocco) Maghreb de Fès
Chemmam 90+10'	Report	Abourazzouk 20'
Penalties
Mouelhi (penalty scored); Derbali (penalty missed); I. Msakni (penalty scored); Hichri (penalty missed); Y. Msakni (penalty scored)	3–4	(penalty scored) Escher; (penalty scored) El Basri; (penalty missed) Zekroumi; (penalty scored) Dahmani; (penalty scored) Diop

Stade Olympique de Radès, Tunis
Referee: Daniel Bennett (South Africa)
