= Mohamed Ben Ammar =

Tunisian footballer

Personal information
- Height: 1.80 m (5 ft 11 in)
- Position: Midfielder

Team information
- Current team: SA M. Bourguiba

Senior career*
Years	Team	Apps	(Gls)
2010–2013	Stade Tunisien	44	(3)
2013–2015	AS Marsa	29	(0)
2014	→ Hammam-Lif (loan)	3	(1)
2015–2016	Stade Tunisien	4	(0)
2017–	SA M. Bourguiba		
- * Club domestic league appearances and goals as of 11:46, 18 July 2018 (UTC) ‡ National team caps and goals as of 11:46, 17 April 2018 (UTC)

Mohamed Ben Ammar (Arabic: محمد بن عمار is a Tunisian football player, currently playing for Stade Africain Menzel Bourguiba.

== Career statistics ==
=== Club ===
As of 18 July 2018.

Club	Season	League			Cup		Continental		Other		Total	
Club	Season	Division	Apps	Goals	Apps	Goals	Apps	Goals	Apps	Goals	Apps	Goals
Stade Tunisien	2010–11	Ligue Professionnelle 1	8	0	0	0	–		0	0	8	0
Stade Tunisien	2011–12	Ligue Professionnelle 1	27	3	0	0	–		0	0	27	3
Stade Tunisien	2012–13	Ligue Professionnelle 1	9	0	0	0	–		0	0	9	0
Stade Tunisien	Total		44	3	0	0	0	0	0	0	44	3
AS Marsa	2013–14	Ligue Professionnelle 1	13	0	0	0	–		0	0	13	0
AS Marsa	2014–15	Ligue Professionnelle 1	16	0	0	0	–		0	0	16	0
AS Marsa	Total		29	0	0	0	0	0	0	0	29	0
Hammam-Lif (loan)	2013–14	Ligue Professionnelle 1	3	1	0	0	–		0	0	3	1
Stade Tunisien	2015–16	Ligue Professionnelle 1	4	0	0	0	–		0	0	4	0
Career total			80	4	0	0	0	0	0	0	80	4
