= Youcef Belaïli =

Algerian footballer (born 1992)

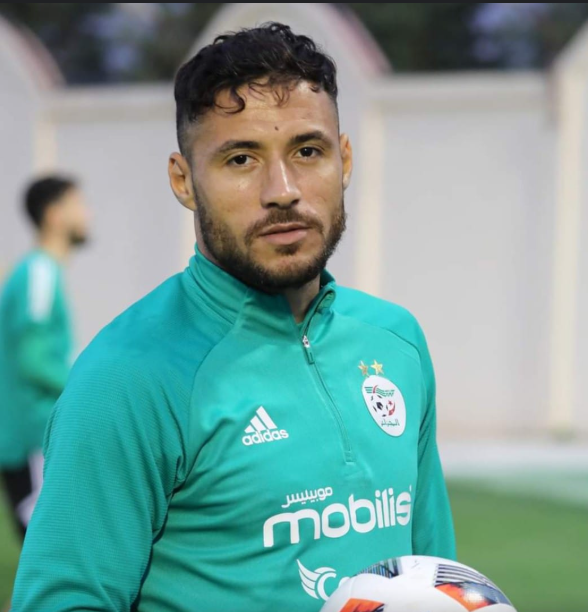
- Belaïli with Algeria in 2021

Personal information
- Full name: Mohamed Youcef Belaïli
- Date of birth: 14 March 1992 (age 34)
- Place of birth: Oran, Algeria
- Height: 1.79 m (5 ft 10 in)
- Position: Left winger

Team information
- Current team: Espérance de Tunis
- Number: 11

Youth career
- 2007–2008: RCG Oran
- 2008–2009: MC Oran
- 2009–2010: CA Bordj Bou Arréridj

Senior career*
Years	Team	Apps	(Gls)
2010	CA Bordj Bou Arréridj	5	(0)
2010–2012	MC Oran	48	(16)
2012–2014	Espérance de Tunis	56	(10)
2014–2015	USM Alger	41	(13)
2017–2018	Angers	1	(0)
2018–2019	Espérance de Tunis	52	(13)
2019–2020	Al Ahli Saudi	19	(6)
2020–2021	Qatar SC	25	(17)
2022	Brest	19	(3)
2022–2023	Ajaccio	17	(6)
2023–2024	MC Alger	26	(16)
2024–	Espérance de Tunis	41	(13)

International career^{‡}
2010–2016	Algeria U23	14	(4)
2015–	Algeria	59	(10)
Medal record
Representing Algeria
FIFA Arab Cup
Winner	2021 Qatar
Africa Cup of Nations
Winner	2019 Egypt
UNAF U-23 Tournament
Winner	2010 Morocco
- * Club domestic league appearances and goals as of 22 November 2026 ‡ National team caps and goals as of 9 October 2025

Mohamed Youcef Belaïli (Arabic: محمد يوسف بلايلي; born 14 March 1992) is an Algerian professional footballer who plays as a left winger for Tunisian Ligue Professionnelle 1 club Espérance de Tunis, whom he captains, and the Algeria national team.

== Early life ==
Belaïli was born on 14 March 1992 in Oran. He started playing young with RCG Oran and afterwards with MC Oran.

== Club career ==
=== Early career ===
Youcef Belaïli started his football career with RCG Oran, then moved to the reserve team of MC Oran. Belaïli's first season in the Division 1 was with CA Bordj Bou Arréridj, and their first match was on 6 March 2010 against MC El Eulma as a substitute, and after only one season, Belaïli returned to MC Oran for two seasons. In the first season, Belaïli began to impose himself and his first goal was against USM Alger on 27 November 2010, and in the second season Belaïli became an essential piece and required by several clubs inside and outside the country.

=== Espérance de Tunis ===
On 24 May 2012, Belaïli traveled to Tunisia to negotiate a move to Tunisian club Espérance de Tunis. Two days later, he announced that he had agreed to personal terms with the club and would be signing a three-year contract in the upcoming days. On 5 June, Belaïli officially joined Espérance, signing a three-year contract worth €2 million. On 20 July, Belaïli made his debut for Espérance as a substitute against ASO Chlef in the group stage of the 2012 CAF Champions League. Coming on in the 77th minute, Belaïli won his team a penalty to level the score and then provided an assist for Yannick N'Djeng in injury time to help Espérance win the game., and despite the fact he came at the end of the 2011–12 season and played only three matches, he won the first title of his career, the Tunisian Ligue Professionnelle 1.

=== Return to Algeria and suspension ===
On 14 June 2014, Belaïli joined USM Alger in a contract for two seasons for a monthly salary of 5 million dinars as the highest salary in the Algerian Ligue Professionnelle 1. Belaïli was one of the stars because of his high technical skills and led the club to valuable victories, especially against JS Kabylie where he scored the winning goal in the last minutes in a match that had an unfortunate end with the death of the player Albert Ebossé Bodjongo who was struck on the head by a projectile thrown by an unknown person while the teams were leaving the field. Belaïli for having tested positive for cocaine during an anti-doping control carried out during the match against MC El Eulma on 7 August 2015 counting for the CAF Champions League. A four-year suspension is imposed on him by Confederation of African Football, his contract with USM Alger is terminated in the wake. On 4 November 2016, the Court of Arbitration for Sport in Lausanne announced that it had decided to reduce Blaili's sentence to two years, adding that the player smoked hookah two days before the match without being aware of its content, noting that he did not commit any error or noticeable negligence.

A year later, Belaïli joined Angers in Ligue 1. but the experience was not successful as he only played one match in the Coupe de la Ligue.

=== A second chance abroad ===
On 26 January 2018, Belaïli decided to leave and return to his former club Espérance de Tunis. His return was successful by all standards and was behind his return to the Algeria national team, either at the level of titles won five of them including two consecutive titles in the CAF Champions League. After winning the Africa Cup of Nations with the national team. Belaïli decided to take a new experience this time with Al Ahli of Saudi Arabia for three seasons in a deal that exceeded three million dollars. but it was not successful as he did not adapt there to decide to leave to join the neighbor Qatar SC. There Belaïli found his features where he scored 13 goals, including a hat-trick against Al-Ahli Doha which was the first in his football career. In the FIFA Arab Cup and after the end of the match against Morocco, the father of Youcef Belaïli, who is his manager, announced the termination of the contract by mutual consent.

On 1 February 2022, Brest announced the signing of Belaïli on a six-months deal, including an option to extend for another three years. On 29 September 2022, Belaïli was released from the club after having his contract mutually terminated.

On 12 October 2022, Belaïli joined French Ligue 1 club Ajaccio for the remainder of the season.

=== Return to Algeria ===
On 9 August 2023, after long negotiations Youcef Belaïli joined MC Alger for two seasons, who had been without a club since April after terminating his contract with Ajaccio, Belaïli who will wear number 10 sought through his father to find a club in Europe but it was ultimately in Algeria that he bounced around for eight years. Belaïli reportedly signed a contract with the highest salary ever received by a player in the Algerian Ligue 1, with a monthly salary of around DA 1.5 billion with an advance of eight months.

=== Espérance de Tunis ===
In July 2024, Belaïli joined Espérance de Tunis by signing a contract until 2026. On 21 June 2025, he scored the only goal for his club in a 1–0 victory over Los Angeles FC, secuing their first win in the 2025 FIFA Club World Cup.

== International career ==
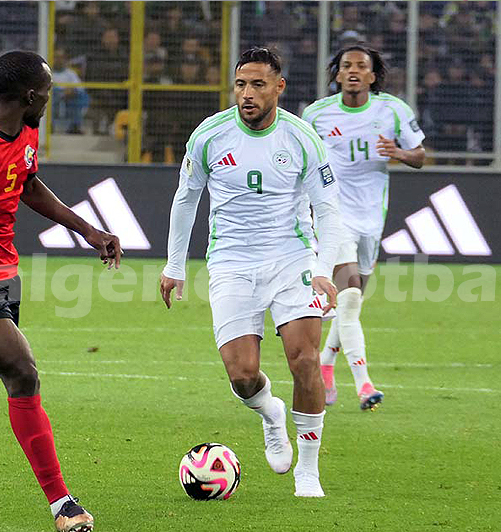
Belaili with Algeria in 2025

=== Youth ===
Belaili was called up for Algeria U23 to participate in the 2010 UNAF U-23 Tournament. On 13 December 2010, he scored an own goal in the 54th minute against the Cameroon U23s. On 16 November 2011, he was selected as part of Algeria's squad for the 2011 CAF U-23 Championship in Morocco.

=== Senior ===
Belaili was a key member of the Algeria squad that won the 2019 Africa Cup of Nations.

In 2021, Belaili was named in the squad of players to play in the 2021 FIFA Arab Cup in Qatar. In the quarter-finals against Morocco, Belaili scored a volley from 40 yards in extra time to give his side a 2–1 lead. In the semi-final against Qatar, Belaili scored a penalty rebound after 15 minutes of injury time to secure Algeria's place in the final.

In December 2023, he was named in Algeria's squad for the 2023 Africa Cup of Nations.

== Doping ban ==
In September 2015, Youcef Belaïli was suspended by Confederation of African Football for two years for having tested positive for cocaine during an anti-doping control carried out during the match against MC El Eulma on 7 August 2015 counting for the CAF Champions League. He admits the facts, Bellaili is tested a second time positive for doping after consuming a prohibited product (Cocaine), during his team's match against CS Constantine counting for the fifth round of the Ligue Professionnelle 1, played on 19 September 2015 in Constantine. A four-year suspension is imposed on him, his contract with USM Alger is terminated in the wake. However, in March 2016, FIFA confirmed they were giving an extended four-year ban to apply worldwide through 19 September 2019.

== Career statistics ==
=== Club ===
As of 22 November 2026

Appearances and goals by club, season and competition
Club	Season	League			National cup (Note: Includes Algerian Cup, Tunisian Cup, King's Cup and Emir of Qatar Cup)		League cup (Note: Includes Coupe de la Ligue and Qatari Stars Cup)		Continental		Other		Total	
Club	Season	Division	Apps	Goals	Apps	Goals	Apps	Goals	Apps	Goals	Apps	Goals	Apps	Goals
CA Bordj Bou Arréridj	2009–10	Algerian Ligue 1	4	0	1	0	—		—		—		5	0
MC Oran	2010–11	Algerian Ligue 1	19	4	2	2	—		—		—		21	6
MC Oran	2011–12	Algerian Ligue 1	24	8	0	0	—		—		—		24	8
MC Oran	Total		43	12	2	2	—		—		—		45	14
Espérance de Tunis	2011–12	Tunisian Ligue 1	3	0	1	0	—		6 (Note: Appearance(s) in CAF Champions League)	0	—		10	0
Espérance de Tunis	2012–13	Tunisian Ligue 1	20	6	—		—		11	1	—		31	7
Espérance de Tunis	2013–14	Tunisian Ligue 1	12	2	0	0	—		0	0	—		12	2
Espérance de Tunis	Total		35	8	1	0	—		17	1	—		53	9
USM Alger	2014–15	Algerian Ligue 1	25	6	2	0	—		8	3	—		35	9
USM Alger	2015–16	Algerian Ligue 1	4	3	0	0	—		0	0	—		4	3
USM Alger	Total		29	9	2	0	—		8	3	—		39	12
Angers	2017–18	Ligue 1	0	0	0	0	1	0	—		—		1	0
Espérance de Tunis	2017–18	Tunisian Ligue 1	9	3	1	0	—		13	3	—		23	6
Espérance de Tunis	2018–19	Tunisian Ligue 1	11	0	2	1	—		11	3	5 (Note: One appearance in Tunisian Super Cup, one appearance and one goal in Arab Club Champions Cup, two appearances and one goal in FIFA Club World Cup, one appearance and one goal in CAF Super Cup)	3	29	7
Espérance de Tunis	Total		20	3	3	1	—		24	6	5	3	52	13
Al Ahli Saudi	2019–20	Saudi Pro League	13	2	4	3	—		2 (Note: Appearances in AFC Champions League)	1	—		19	6
Qatar SC	2020–21	Qatar Stars League	15	13	1	1	—		—		—		16	14
Qatar SC	2021–22	Qatar Stars League	7	2	0	0	1	1	—		—		8	3
Qatar SC	Total		22	15	1	1	1	1	—		—		24	17
Brest	2021–22	Ligue 1	13	3	0	0	—		—		—		13	3
Brest	2022–23	Ligue 1	6	0	0	0	—		—		—		6	0
Brest	Total		19	3	0	0	—		—		—		19	3
Ajaccio	2022–23	Ligue 1	17	6	0	0	—		—		—		17	6
MC Alger	2023–24	Algerian Ligue 1	21	14	5	2	—		—		—		26	16
Espérance de Tunis	2024–25	Tunisian Ligue 1	21	9	3	2	—		10	7	3 (Note: One appearance and one goal in Tunisian Super Cup, two appearances and one goal in FIFA Club World Cup)	2	37	20
Espérance de Tunis	2025–26	Tunisian Ligue 1	12	3	0	0	—		2	1	1 (Note: Appearance in Tunisian Super Cup)	1	15	5
Espérance de Tunis	2026–27	Tunisian Ligue 1	8	1	0	0	—		1	0	0	0	9	1
Espérance de Tunis	Total		41	13	3	2	—		13	8	4	3	61	26
Career total			263	84	22	11	2	1	64	19	9	6	360	122

=== International ===
As of match played 9 October 2025

Appearances and goals by national team and year
National team	Year	Apps	Goals
Algeria	2015	2	0
Algeria	2018	2	0
Algeria	2019	14	5
Algeria	2021	16	3
Algeria	2022	13	1
Algeria	2023	2	0
Algeria	2024	4	0
Algeria	2025	5	1
Total		58	10

Scores and results list Algeria's goal tally first, score column indicates score after each Belaïli goal.

List of international goals scored by Youcef Belaïli
No.	Date	Venue	Opponent	Score	Result	Competition
1	16 June 2019	Jassim bin Hamad Stadium, Doha, Qatar	Mali	2–2	3–2	Friendly
2	27 June 2019	30 June Stadium, Cairo, Egypt	Senegal	1–0	1–0	2019 Africa Cup of Nations
3	7 July 2019	30 June Stadium, Cairo, Egypt	Guinea	1–0	3–0	2019 Africa Cup of Nations
4	14 November 2019	Mustapha Tchaker Stadium, Blida, Algeria	Zambia	3–0	5–0	2021 Africa Cup of Nations qualification
5	18 November 2019	Botswana National Stadium, Gaborone, Botswana	Botswana	1–0	1–0	2021 Africa Cup of Nations qualification
6	12 November 2021	Cairo International Stadium, Cairo, Egypt	Djibouti	1–0	4–0	2022 FIFA World Cup qualification
7	11 December 2021	Al Thumama Stadium, Doha, Qatar	Morocco	2–1	2–2	2021 FIFA Arab Cup
8	15 December 2021	Al Thumama Stadium, Doha, Qatar	Qatar	2–1	2–1	2021 FIFA Arab Cup
9	4 June 2022	5 July Stadium, Algiers, Algeria	Uganda	2–0	2–0	2023 Africa Cup of Nations qualification
10	5 June 2025	Mohamed Hamlaoui Stadium, Constantine, Algeria	Rwanda	1–0	2–0	Friendly

== Honours ==
Espérance de Tunis

- Tunisian Ligue Professionnelle 1: 2011–12, 2013–14, 2017–18, 2018–19, 2024–25
- Tunisian Cup: 2024–25, 2025–26
- Tunisian Super Cup: 2018, 2024, 2025
- CAF Champions League: 2018, 2018–19

MC Alger

- Algerian Ligue Professionnelle 1: 2023–24

Algeria U23

- UNAF U-23 Tournament: 2010

Algeria

- Africa Cup of Nations: 2019
- FIFA Arab Cup: 2021

Individual

- African Inter-Club Player of the Year: 2019
- FIFA Arab Cup Silver Ball: 2021
- FIFA Arab Cup Team of the Tournament: 2021
- Best Algerian Player In Africa: 2024
