= 2013 Africa Cup of Nations Group D =

Football tournament group stage

Group D of the 2013 Africa Cup of Nations ran from 22 January until 30 January. It consisted of Ivory Coast, Tunisia, Algeria and Togo. The matches were held in the South African cities of Rustenburg and Nelspruit.

== Standings ==
Pos	Team	Pld	W	D	L	GF	GA	GD	Pts	Qualification
1	Ivory Coast	3	2	1	0	7	3	+4	7	Advance to knockout stage
2	Togo	3	1	1	1	4	3	+1	4	Advance to knockout stage
3	Tunisia	3	1	1	1	2	4	−2	4	
4	Algeria	3	0	1	2	2	5	−3	1	

Source: CAF

All times South African Standard Time (UTC+2)

== Ivory Coast vs. Togo ==
22 January 2013
17:00

Ivory Coast	2–1	Togo
Y. Touré 8'; Gervinho 88'	Report	J. Ayité 45+2'

Royal Bafokeng Stadium, Rustenburg
Attendance: 2,000
Referee: Sidi Alioum (Cameroon)

Ivory Coast	Togo

GK	1	Boubacar Barry
RB	21	Emmanuel Eboué
CB	4	Kolo Touré
CB	22	Sol Bamba
LB	17	Siaka Tiéné
CM	19	Yaya Touré
CM	5	Didier Zokora
RW	15	Max Gradel	(yellow card) 32'	(substituted off) 59'
AM	13	Didier Ya Konan		(substituted off) 63'
LW	10	Gervinho
CF	11	Didier Drogba (c)		(substituted off) 74'
Substitutions:
FW	8	Salomon Kalou		(substituted on) 59'
MF	9	Cheick Tioté		(substituted on) 63'
FW	12	Wilfried Bony		(substituted on) 74'
Manager:
(France) Sabri Lamouchi

GK	16	Kossi Agassa
RB	21	Djené
CB	5	Serge Akakpo
CB	9	Vincent Bossou	(yellow card) 33'
LB	2	Daré Nibombé	(yellow card) 61'	(substituted off) 90+1'
RM	6	Abdoul-Gafar Mamah
CM	15	Alaixys Romao	(yellow card) 47'
CM	8	Komlan Amewou
LM	11	Jonathan Ayité		(substituted off) 78'
SS	17	Serge Gakpé		(substituted off) 61'
CF	4	Emmanuel Adebayor (c)
Substitutions:
FW	10	Floyd Ayité		(substituted on) 61'
MF	14	Prince Segbefia		(substituted on) 78'
MF	7	Moustapha Salifou		(substituted on) 90+1'
Manager:
(France) Didier Six

Man of the Match:
Gervinho (Ivory Coast)

Assistant referees:
Evarist Menkouande (Cameroon)
Theophile Vinga (Gabon)
Fourth official:
Sylvester Kirwa (Kenya)

== Tunisia vs. Algeria ==
22 January 2013
20:00

Tunisia	1–0	Algeria
Msakni 90+1'	Report

Royal Bafokeng Stadium, Rustenburg
Attendance: 10,000
Referee: Bakary Gassama (Gambia)

Tunisia	Algeria

GK	22	Moez Ben Cherifia
RB	2	Bilel Ifa
CB	3	Walid Hichri
CB	20	Aymen Abdennour	(yellow card) 13'
LB	12	Khalil Chemmam (c)
CM	14	Mejdi Traoui		(substituted off) 46'
CM	21	Khaled Mouelhi
RW	17	Issam Jemâa		(substituted off) 16'
AM	8	Chadi Hammami
LW	7	Youssef Msakni	(yellow card) 90+2'
CF	19	Saber Khelifa
Substitutions:
FW	9	Hamdi Harbaoui	(yellow card) 38'	(substituted on) 16'	(substituted off) 85'
MF	10	Oussama Darragi		(substituted on) 46'
FW	11	Fakhreddine Ben Youssef		(substituted on) 85'
Manager:
Sami Trabelsi

GK	23	Raïs M'Bolhi
CB	4	Essaïd Belkalem
CB	12	Carl Medjani
CB	3	Cadamuro Bentaïba		(substituted off) 74'
RM	2	Mehdi Mostefa
CM	17	Adlène Guedioura		(substituted off) 86'
CM	8	Mehdi Lacen (c)
LM	6	Djamel Mesbah	(yellow card) 72'
AM	14	Foued Kadir		(substituted off) 90+3'
AM	10	Sofiane Feghouli
CF	9	Islam Slimani
Substitutions:
FW	15	Hillal Soudani		(substituted on) 74'
MF	18	Khaled Lemmouchia		(substituted on) 86'
FW	13	Amine Aoudia		(substituted on) 90+2'
Manager:
(Bosnia and Herzegovina) Vahid Halilhodžić

Man of the Match:
Youssef Msakni (Tunisia)

Assistant referees:
Angesom Ogbamariam (Eritrea)
Peter Edibe (Nigeria)
Fourth official:
Badara Diatta (Senegal)

== Ivory Coast vs. Tunisia ==
26 January 2013
17:00

Ivory Coast	3–0	Tunisia
Gervinho 21'; Y. Touré 87'; Ya Konan 90'	Report

Royal Bafokeng Stadium, Rustenburg
Attendance: 20,000
Referee: Rajindraparsad Seechurn (Mauritius)

Ivory Coast	Tunisia

GK	1	Boubacar Barry
RB	21	Emmanuel Eboué
CB	22	Sol Bamba	(yellow card) 31'
CB	5	Didier Zokora (c)
LB	17	Siaka Tiéné
CM	6	Romaric		(substituted off) 89'
CM	9	Cheick Tioté	(yellow card) 73'
RW	10	Gervinho
AM	19	Yaya Touré
LW	8	Salomon Kalou		(substituted off) 81'
CF	18	Lacina Traoré		(substituted off) 67'
Substitutions:
FW	11	Didier Drogba		(substituted on) 67'
FW	15	Max Gradel		(substituted on) 81'
MF	13	Didier Ya Konan		(substituted on) 89'
Manager:
(France) Sabri Lamouchi

GK	22	Moez Ben Cherifia
RB	18	Anis Boussaïdi	(substituted off) 57'
CB	2	Bilel Ifa
CB	20	Aymen Abdennour
LB	12	Khalil Chemmam (c)
DM	21	Khaled Mouelhi
CM	14	Mejdi Traoui	(substituted off) 86'
CM	8	Chadi Hammami
RW	19	Saber Khelifa
LW	7	Youssef Msakni
CF	11	Fakhreddine Ben Youssef	(substituted off) 46'
Substitutions:
MF	10	Oussama Darragi	(substituted on) 46'
FW	9	Hamdi Harbaoui	(substituted on) 57'
FW	15	Zouheir Dhaouadi	(substituted on) 86'
Manager:
Sami Trabelsi

Man of the Match:
Yaya Touré (Ivory Coast)

Assistant referees:
Djibril Camara (Senegal)
El Hadji Malick Samba (Senegal)
Fourth official:
Daniel Bennett (South Africa)

== Algeria vs. Togo ==
26 January 2013
20:00

Algeria	0–2	Togo
	Report	Adebayor 31'; Womé 90+5'

Royal Bafokeng Stadium, Rustenburg
Attendance: 35,000
Referee: Hamada Nampiandraza (Madagascar)

Algeria	Togo

GK	23	Raïs M'Bolhi
RB	2	Mehdi Mostefa	(yellow card) 2'
CB	4	Essaïd Belkalem
CB	5	Rafik Halliche	(yellow card) 90+10'
LB	6	Djamel Mesbah
CM	17	Adlène Guedioura	(yellow card) 39'
CM	8	Mehdi Lacen (c)	(yellow card) 48'	(substituted off) 83'
RW	14	Foued Kadir		(substituted off) 66'
AM	10	Sofiane Feghouli
LW	15	Hillal Soudani
CF	9	Islam Slimani		(substituted off) 75'
Substitutions:
MF	19	Yacine Bezzaz		(substituted on) 66'
FW	13	Amine Aoudia		(substituted on) 75'
FW	11	Hameur Bouazza		(substituted on) 83'
Manager:
(Bosnia and Herzegovina) Vahid Halilhodžić

GK	16	Kossi Agassa
CB	21	Djené
CB	5	Serge Akakpo	(yellow card) 90'
CB	2	Daré Nibombé
RM	6	Abdoul-Gafar Mamah	(yellow card) 63'
CM	15	Alaixys Romao
CM	8	Komlan Amewou
LM	11	Jonathan Ayité	(yellow card) 41'	(substituted off) 88'
RF	17	Serge Gakpé		(substituted off) 74'
CF	4	Emmanuel Adebayor (c)
LF	7	Moustapha Salifou		(substituted off) 57'
Substitutions:
MF	3	Dové Womé		(substituted on) 57'
MF	12	Sapol Mani		(substituted on) 74'
DF	9	Vincent Bossou		(substituted on) 88'
Manager:
(France) Didier Six

Man of the Match:
Emmanuel Adebayor (Togo)

Assistant referees:
Félicien Kabanda (Rwanda)
Marwa Range (Kenya)
Fourth official:
Sylvester Kirwa (Kenya)

== Algeria vs. Ivory Coast ==
30 January 2013
19:00

Algeria	2–2	Ivory Coast
Feghouli 64' (pen.); Soudani 70'	Report	Drogba 77'; Bony 81'

Royal Bafokeng Stadium, Rustenburg
Attendance: 5,000
Referee: Eric Otogo-Castane (Gabon)

Algeria	Ivory Coast

GK	23	Raïs M'Bolhi
RB	2	Mehdi Mostefa
CB	4	Essaïd Belkalem
CB	5	Rafik Halliche
LB	6	Djamel Mesbah
DM	18	Khaled Lemmouchia		(substituted off) 87'
CM	17	Adlène Guedioura
CM	8	Mehdi Lacen (c)	(yellow card) 26'
RW	7	Ryad Boudebouz		(substituted off) 62'
LW	15	Hillal Soudani		(substituted off) 82'
CF	9	Islam Slimani
Substitutions:
MF	10	Sofiane Feghouli		(substituted on) 62'
MF	14	Foued Kadir		(substituted on) 82'
MF	20	Saad Tedjar		(substituted on) 87'
Manager:
(Bosnia and Herzegovina) Vahid Halilhodžić

GK	16	Daniel Yeboah
RB	20	Igor Lolo	(yellow card) 48'	(substituted off) 85'
CB	14	Ismaël Traoré
CB	4	Kolo Touré
LB	3	Arthur Boka
CM	6	Romaric		(substituted off) 46'
CM	7	Abdul Razak		(substituted off) 90+2'
RW	2	Arouna Koné
AM	12	Wilfried Bony
LW	8	Salomon Kalou
CF	11	Didier Drogba (c)
Substitutions:
MF	13	Didier Ya Konan		(substituted on) 46'
DF	21	Emmanuel Eboué		(substituted on) 85'
MF	5	Didier Zokora		(substituted on) 90+2'
Manager:
(France) Sabri Lamouchi

Man of the Match:
Kolo Touré (Ivory Coast)

Assistant referees:
Angesom Ogbamariam (Eritrea)
Malik Alidu Salifu (Ghana)
Fourth official:
Gehad Grisha (Egypt)

== Togo vs. Tunisia ==
30 January 2013
19:00

Togo	1–1	Tunisia
Gakpé 13'	Report	Mouelhi 30' (pen.)

Mbombela Stadium, Nelspruit
Attendance: 7,500
Referee: Daniel Bennett (South Africa)

Togo	Tunisia

GK	16	Kossi Agassa	(yellow card) 77'
RB	21	Djené
CB	5	Serge Akakpo
CB	9	Vincent Bossou
LB	2	Daré Nibombé	(yellow card) 65'
RM	6	Abdoul-Gafar Mamah
CM	15	Alaixys Romao
CM	8	Komlan Amewou
LM	10	Floyd Ayité	(yellow card) 85'	(substituted off) 89'
SS	17	Serge Gakpé	(yellow card) 57'	(substituted off) 75'
CF	4	Emmanuel Adebayor (c)	(yellow card) 76'	(substituted off) 90+5'
Substitutions:
FW	11	Jonathan Ayité	(yellow card) 76'	(substituted on) 75'
DF	13	Sadat Ouro-Akoriko		(substituted on) 89'
MF	3	Dové Womé		(substituted on) 90+5'
Manager:
(France) Didier Six

GK	22	Moez Ben Cherifia
RB	8	Chadi Hammami
CB	3	Walid Hichri
CB	20	Aymen Abdennour
LB	12	Khalil Chemmam (c)
CM	14	Mejdi Traoui		(substituted off) 87'
CM	21	Khaled Mouelhi	(yellow card) 12'
RW	23	Wahbi Khazri	(yellow card) 52'	(substituted off) 62'
AM	10	Oussama Darragi
LW	7	Youssef Msakni	(yellow card) 39'
CF	19	Saber Khelifa
Substitutions:
FW	15	Zouheir Dhaouadi		(substituted on) 62'
FW	11	Fakhreddine Ben Youssef		(substituted on) 87'
Manager:
Sami Trabelsi

Man of the Match:
Komlan Amewou (Togo)

Assistant referees:
Marwa Range (Kenya)
Zakhele Siwela (South Africa)
Fourth official:
Bernard Camille (Seychelles)
