= Aymen Ben Amor =

Tunisian footballer

Personal information
- Full name: Aymen Ben Amor
- Date of birth: 7 September 1985 (age 41)
- Place of birth: Sidi Bouzid, Tunisia
- Height: 1.78 m (5 ft 10 in)
- Position: Right back

Team information
- Current team: FC Hammamet

Senior career*
Years	Team	Apps	(Gls)
2006–2010	CS Sfaxien	??	(?)
2010–2013	Espérance de Tunis	24	(0)
2013–2015	US Monastir	40	(6)
2015–2016	EO Sidi Bouzid	7	(2)
2016–	FC Hammamet	0	(0)
- * Club domestic league appearances and goals as of 26 January 2016

Aymen Ben Amor (born 7 September 1985) is a Tunisian footballer who plays as right back for FC Hammamet.

== Honours ==
Club

- CAF Champions League: 2011
- CAF Confederation Cup: 2007, 2008
- Tunisian Ligue 1: 2009–10, 10–11, 11–12
- Tunisian Cup: 2008-09, 2010–11
