= Dové Womé =

Togolese footballer

Personal information
- Full name: Sename Dové Womé Dobé
- Date of birth: 8 June 1991 (age 35)
- Place of birth: Fiokpo, Togo
- Height: 1.66 m (5 ft 5 in)
- Position: Attacking midfielder

Youth career
- 2007–2008: Maranatha

Senior career*
Years	Team	Apps	(Gls)
2008–2011	Maranatha	23	(6)
2009–2010	→ Liberty Professionals (loan)	2	(0)
2011–2013	Free State Stars	55	(10)
2013–2014	Mamelodi Sundowns	18	(5)
2014–2017	SuperSport United	61	(10)
2017	→ Orlando Pirates (loan)	13	(3)
2018	Gomido		
2018–2019	Ventspils	18	(2)
2019–2021	Al-Yarmouk		
2021–2022	Al-Diwaniya		

International career
2008–2009	Togo U-17	?	(?)
2009–2021	Togo	35	(6)
- * Club domestic league appearances and goals as of 16:21, 20 January 2022 (UTC)

Sename Dové Womé Dobe (born 8 June 1991) is a Togolese professional footballer who plays as an attacking midfielder.

== Club career ==
Womé was born in Fiokpo, Togo. He began his career with Maranatha F.C. and earned in the 2008–09 season his first 23 professional matches in the Togolese Championnat National, before was in October 2009 loaned to Liberty Professionals.

In January 2017 Womé joined Orlando Pirates on loan from SuperSport United.

On 27 July 2018, Virsliga side FK Ventspils announced the signing of Womé.

== International career ==
Womé earned his first call up to the Togo national team on 6 September 2009 for the World Cup Qualifying match against Morocco and made his international debut for Togo one month later, in a friendly on 14 October 2009 against Japan. Womé scored a goal in a friendly match against Bahrain, lost by 1–5.

=== International goals ===
Scores and results list Togo's goal tally first, score column indicates score after each Womé goal.

List of international goals scored by Dové Womé
No.	Date	Venue	Opponent	Score	Result	Competition
1	6 November 2009	Bahrain National Stadium, Riffa, Bahrain	Bahrain	1–3	1–5	Friendly
2	14 October 2012	Stade de Kégué, Lomé, Togo	Gabon	1–0	2–1	2013 Africa Cup of Nations qualification
3	29 December 2012	Sohar Regional Sports Complex, Sohar, Oman	Oman	1–0	1–0	Friendly
4	26 January 2013	Royal Bafokeng Stadium, Phokeng, South Africa	Algeria	2–0	2–0	2013 Africa Cup of Nations
5	23 March 2013	Stade Ahmadou Ahidjo, Yaoundé, Cameroon	Cameroon	1–1	1–2	2014 FIFA World Cup qualification
6	31 August 2017	Stade Adrar, Agadir, Morocco	Niger	1–0	2–0	Friendly

== Honours ==
SuperSport United

- Nedbank Cup: 2016
