= Youssef Msakni =

Tunisian footballer (born 1990)

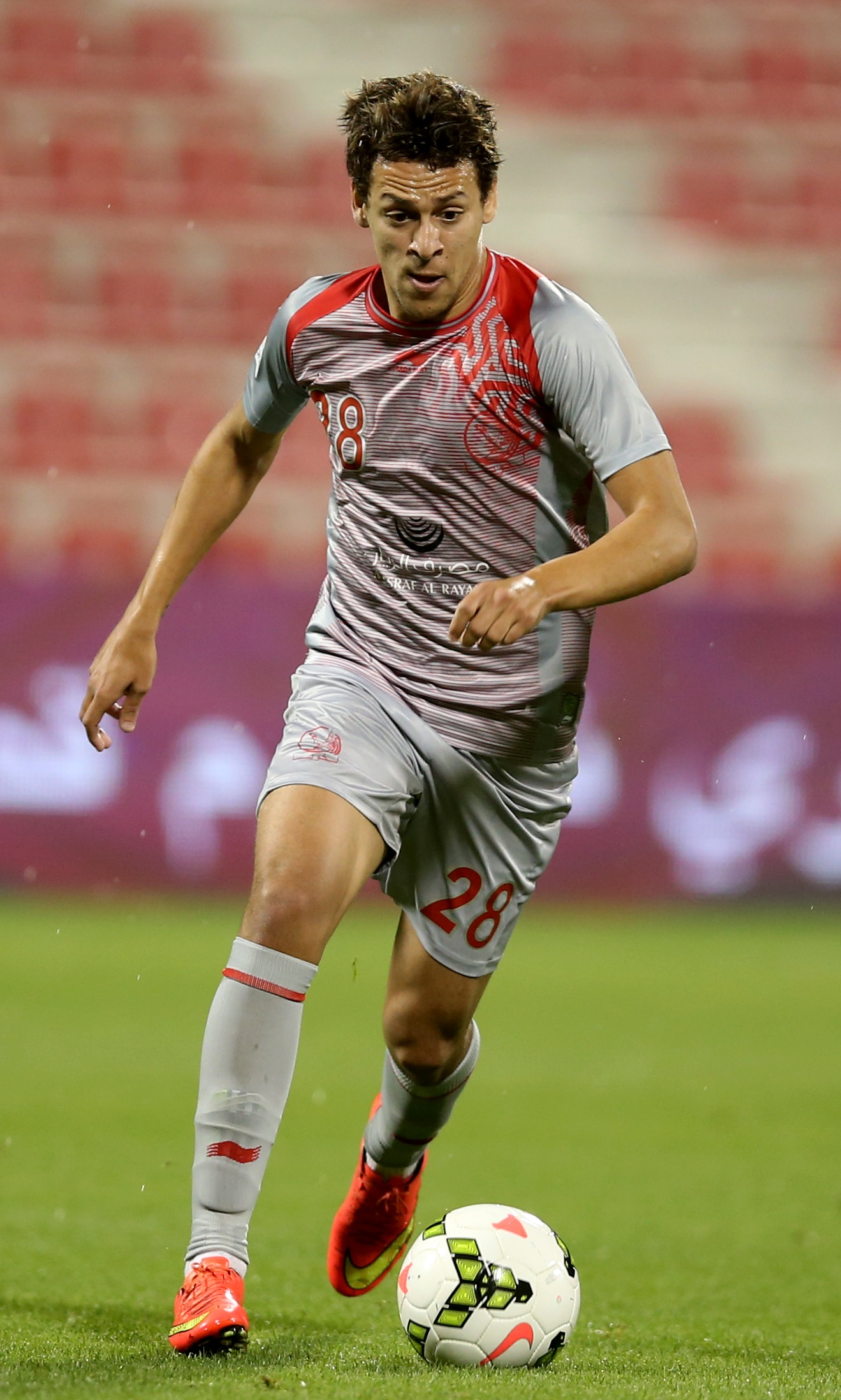
- Msakni with Al Duhail in 2015

Personal information
- Full name: Youssef Msakni
- Date of birth: 28 October 1990 (age 36)
- Place of birth: Tunis, Tunisia
- Height: 1.75 m (5 ft 9 in)
- Positions: Winger; forward

Youth career
- 2004–2007: Stade Tunisien

Senior career*
Years	Team	Apps	(Gls)
2006–2007	Stade Tunisien	28	(8)
2008–2013	Espérance de Tunis	95	(37)
2013–2023	Al Duhail	119	(73)
2019	→ Eupen (loan)	13	(3)
2021–2023	→ Al Arabi (loan)	40	(23)
2023–2025	Al Arabi	27	(15)
2025–2026	Espérance de Tunis	2	(0)

International career
2006–2007	Tunisia U17	13	(4)
2009	Tunisia U20	3	(0)
2009–2011	Tunisia U23	4	(1)
2010–2024	Tunisia	104	(23)
- * Club domestic league appearances and goals

Youssef Msakni (Arabic: يُوسُف الْمُسَاكِنِيّ; born 28 October 1990) is a Tunisian former professional footballer who played as a winger or forward.

Msakni has played over 100 matches and scored 23 goals for Tunisia.

== Club career ==
=== Espérance de Tunis ===
Having spent his youth career at Stade Tunisien, Msakni moved to Espérance de Tunis in July 2008.

He played his first game with ES Tunis on 26 July 2009, on the first day of the 2009–10 season, against Olympique Béja. He entered the field in the 79th minute of play in replacement of Henri Bienvenu. Two weeks later, on 8 August, Msakni scored his first league goal in his third game against AS Kasserine in the 54th minute of play of a 4–0 win.

On 12 November 2011, he won the CAF Champions League, finishing second in the competition with five goals, just behind Wydad AC striker Fabrice Ondama, who scored six goals.

On 30 September 2012, he won the Tunisian Ligue Professionnelle 1 for the fourth time, winning the title of best scorer in the Tunisian football championship with 17 goals. According to Goal.com, Msakni was the 48th best footballer of the 2012 season in all countries, thanks in particular to the performances he realized under the colors of his club or the national team. During the transfer period, he was courted by many French clubs, including Paris Saint-Germain, Lille OSC, AS Monaco and FC Lorient, but on 3 July 2012 the attacking midfielder signed on a four-year contract with Qatari Stars League club Lekhwiya SC, but he joined the club on 1 January 2013.

=== Lekhwiya and Al Duhail ===
On 1 January 2013, Msakni became a player of Qatari club Lekhwiya SC for a period of four and a half years; the total amount of the transfer was 23 million dinars (€11.5 million), a record for an African player.

On 10 February, he scored his first goal in the 28th minute, with his team winning 4–0 against Al-Wakrah SC. On 26 February, Msakni proved decisive in the AFC Champions League with a free-kick in the 33rd minute, allowing his team to win 2–1. In March 2013, Msakni was reportedly coveted by four English clubs: Newcastle United, Arsenal, Everton, and Tottenham. This growing interest pushed the Qatari club leaders to review the player's release clause by increasing his price. On 4 May, he won the 2013 Qatar Crown Prince Cup against the Al Sadd after scoring his team's third goal in a 3–2 win.

A complicated start to the 2013–14 season, during which he scored 7 goals in 12 league games, the Qatari media linked him with a departure to Ukrainian champions Shakhtar Donetsk.

The start of the Asian campaign begins on 8 February 2014 for Msakni and his teammates: they opposed the Bahraini team Hidd SCC in the second round of the 2014 AFC Champions League; they won the match 2–1, including a decisive pass from the Tunisian striker. A week later, Lekhwiya SC competed in the third preliminary round of the same competition against Kuwaiti club Kuwait SC, where two of his teammates in Tunisia, Issam Jemâa and Chadi Hammami, played. Msakni scored a goal and delivered two assists.

After the team changed its name from Lekhwiya to Al Duhail, he received offers from Olympique de Marseille and teams playing in La Liga, but he preferred to stay in Qatar and play in Europe after 2018 FIFA World Cup.

On 8 April 2018, it was reported that Msakni would miss this summer's World Cup in Russia after being ruled out for six months because of a knee injury.

Msakni was linked with a move to Premier League club Brighton & Hove Albion in December 2018. In January 2019, he moved on loan to Belgian First Division A side K.A.S. Eupen.

=== Return to Espérance de Tunis ===
In November 2025, Msakni returned to Espérance de Tunis after nearly 13 years of his departure following the injury of Youcef Belaïli.

== International career ==
=== CAN 2010 ===
On 14 December 2009, he received his first call-up to the Tunisia national team from coach Faouzi Benzarti for a friendly against Gambia in preparation for the 2010 Africa Cup of Nations. On 9 January 2010, at Stade El Menzah. He entered the field in the 35th minute following Oussama Darragi's injury. Msakni played his first Africa Cup of Nations at only 19 years old and held a place in the Benzarti squad. In the first match, against Zambia, he delivered a decisive pass to Zouheir Dhaouadi, offering him the goal of the equalizer. He was one of the players in the match against Gabon, and was replaced in the 67th minute by Chaouki Ben Saada. However, he did not participate in the elimination of his team against Cameroon.

=== CHAN 2011 ===
On 25 February 2011, he won the 2011 CHAN with Tunisia on a 3–0 victory over Angola; he scored a single goal during this competition, against Angola but this time in the group stage.

=== CAN 2012 ===
In the first game against Morocco, he scored in the 75th minute of play by eliminating two opponents, dribbling them one after the other before striking a cross hit of the right, which allowed Tunisia to win the match 2–1. In the second game against Niger, he opened the score in the fourth minute of play by passing through three opponents before entering the surface and scoring right; Tunisia took a 2–1 lead and qualified for the quarter-finals of the 2012 Africa Cup of Nations. The third match was difficult for Tunisia and lost 0–1 against Gabon. The quarter-finals between Tunisia and Ghana when Tunisia was eliminated from the competition.

=== CAN 2013 ===
Following a difficult qualification at 2013 Africa Cup of Nations against Sierra Leone, Msakni was a part of the group in South Africa. On 22 January, in the first match of Group D against Algeria, he scored in the 90th minute by undoing a 25-meter rolled strike that is lodged in the goal of Raïs M'Bolhi, allowing Tunisians to win the match 1–0). He e was elected as the man of the match and the scorer of the most beautiful goal of the competition. Once again in the second match, Msakni and his team-mates lost 0–3 against the Ivory Coast. In the last game of group stage, Tunisia drew 1–1 with Togo and finished third in Group D.

=== CAN 2015 ===
Msakni took part in the 2015 Africa Cup of Nations in Equatorial Guinea, where he played in the first match against Cape Verde replacing Wahbi Khazri in the 82nd minute. He played the full match of his team's 2–1 win against Zambia. He was a substitute at the last match in the group stage against DR Congo replacing Mohamed Ali Yacoubi in the 104th minute in extra time against Equatorial Guinea in the quarter-finals. Tunisia lost 1–2.

=== CAN 2017 ===
Msakni played a major role in qualifying for the tournament after scoring against Togo in Monastir. He was also one of the leading players in the group stage after delivering an assist against Algeria in the 50th minute which they won 2–1 and scoring a goal against Zimbabwe in the 22nd minute of a 4–2 win. Tunisia was eliminated in the quarter-finals against Burkina Faso after losing 0–2.

=== 2017–2019 ===
On 7 October 2017, Msakni scored his first international hat-trick in a 4–1 away victory against Guinea during the 2018 World Cup qualifiers third round. He later captained his national team during the 2019 Africa Cup of Nations in Egypt, scoring a penalty in a 1–1 draw against Angola in the opening match, and another goal in a 3–0 win over Madagascar in the quarter-finals.

=== 2020–2024 ===
On 30 December 2021, Msakni was named in the 28-man squad for the 2021 Africa Cup of Nations in Cameroon. On 4 January 2022, it was announced that both Msakni and Seifeddine Jaziri tested positive for COVID-19, but the Tunisian Football Federation were not allowed to replace them ahead of the tournament. Later on, he scored the only goal in a 1–0 victory over Nigeria in the round of 16.

In November 2022, he was called up for the 2022 FIFA World Cup in Qatar. On 28 December 2023, he was included in the squad for the 2023 Africa Cup of Nations in Ivory Coast. He earned his 100th cap with the national team in the opening match of the African tournament against Namibia.

== Personal life ==
Msakni is the younger brother of fellow Tunisian international Iheb, and he is the son of former Stade Tunisien player Mondher Msakni. Mondher died on 6 February 2026.

On 4 July 2017, Msakni married the Tunisian actress and fashion model Amira Jaziri, but in 2021, the couple was separated.

== Career statistics ==
=== Club ===
Appearances and goals by club, season and competition
Club	Season	League			National cup		Continental		Other		Total	
Club	Season	Division	Apps	Goals	Apps	Goals	Apps	Goals	Apps	Goals	Apps	Goals
Stade Tunisien	2006–07	Tunisian Ligue Professionnelle 1	10	2	0	0	—		—		10	2
Stade Tunisien	2007–08	Tunisian Ligue Professionnelle 1	18	6	0	0	—		—		18	6
Stade Tunisien	Total		28	8	0	0	—		—		28	8
Espérance de Tunis	2007–08	Tunisian Ligue Professionnelle 1	10	0	0	0	—		0	0	10	0
Espérance de Tunis	2008–09	Tunisian Ligue Professionnelle 1	19	4	3	2	—		12 (Note: Eight appearances in Arab Club Champions Cup, four appearances in North African Cup Winners Cup)	0	34	6
Espérance de Tunis	2009–10	Tunisian Ligue Professionnelle 1	22	6	1	0	13 (Note: Appearances in CAF Champions League)	0	0	0	36	6
Espérance de Tunis	2010–11	Tunisian Ligue Professionnelle 1	24	10	5	1	11	5	0	0	40	16
Espérance de Tunis	2011–12	Tunisian Ligue Professionnelle 1	28	17	0	0	10	4	3 (Note: Two appearances in FIFA Club World Cup, one appearance in CAF Super Cup)	0	41	21
Espérance de Tunis	2012–13	Tunisian Ligue Professionnelle 1	1	0	—		—		—		1	0
Espérance de Tunis	Total		104	37	9	3	34	9	15	0	162	49
Al Duhail	2012–13	Qatar Stars League	7	4	2	1	9 (Note: Appearances in AFC Champions League)	4	2 (Note: Appearances in Qatar Cup)	1	20	10
Al Duhail	2013–14	Qatar Stars League	22	12	1	0	8	1	7 (Note: Two appearances and one goal in Qatar Cup, three appearances in Qatari Stars Cup, two appearances in Sheikh Jassim Cup)	1	38	14
Al Duhail	2014–15	Qatar Stars League	17	7	1	0	9	5	2 (Note: One appearance and one goal in Qatar Cup, one appearance and one goal in Sheikh Jassim Cup)	2	29	14
Al Duhail	2015–16	Qatar Stars League	23	14	2	1	6	0	3 (Note: Two appearances and one goal in Qatar Cup, one appearance in Sheikh Jassim Cup)	1	32	15
Al Duhail	2016–17	Qatar Stars League	12	7	2	2	7	3	2 (Note: One appearance in Qatar Cup, one appearance in Sheikh Jassim Cup)	0	23	12
Al Duhail	2017–18	Qatar Stars League	22	25	0	0	4	2	1 (Note: Appearance in Sheikh Jassim Cup)	0	26	27
Al Duhail	2019–20	Qatar Stars League	13	4	1	0	2	1	4 (Note: Two appearances in Qatar Cup, one appearance and one goal in Qatari Stars Cup, one appearance in Sheikh Jassim Cup)	1	20	6
Al Duhail	2020–21	Qatar Stars League	3	0	0	0	—		0	0	3	0
Al Duhail	Total		119	73	9	4	45	16	21	6	194	99
Eupen (loan)	2018–19	Belgian Pro League	7	1	0	0	—		6 (Note: Appearances in Belgian Pro League European play-offs)	2	13	3
Al Arabi (loan)	2020–21	Qatar Stars League	6	2	3	2	—		3 (Note: Appearances in Qatar FA Cup)	2	12	6
Al Arabi (loan)	2021–22	Qatar Stars League	14	8	0	0	—		0	0	14	8
Al Arabi (loan)	2022–23	Qatar Stars League	20	13	4	4	—		5 (Note: One appearance in Qatar Cup, four appearances and four goals in Emir of Qatar Cup)	4	29	21
Al Arabi (loan)	Total		40	23	7	6	0	0	8	6	55	35
Al Arabi	2023–24	Qatar Stars League	19	9	2	2	1	0	1	1	23	12
Al Arabi	2024–25	Qatar Stars League	8	6	0	0	—		4	1	12	7
Al Arabi	Total		27	15	2	2	1	0	5	2	35	19
Espérance de Tunis	2025–26	Tunisian Ligue Professionnelle 1	2	0	0	0	3	0	—		5	0
Career total			327	156	34	15	80	25	46	16	487	213

=== International ===
Appearances and goals by national team and year
National team	Year	Apps	Goals
Tunisia	2010	6	0
Tunisia	2011	0	0
Tunisia	2012	10	3
Tunisia	2013	9	1
Tunisia	2014	3	0
Tunisia	2015	6	0
Tunisia	2016	2	1
Tunisia	2017	11	4
Tunisia	2018	0	0
Tunisia	2019	15	2
Tunisia	2020	4	1
Tunisia	2021	11	2
Tunisia	2022	13	3
Tunisia	2023	7	5
Tunisia	2024	7	1
Total		104	23

Scores and results list Tunisia's goal tally first, score column indicates score after each Msakni goal.

List of international goals scored by Youssef Msakni
No.	Date	Venue	Opponent	Score	Result	Competition
1	23 January 2012	Stade d'Angondjé, Libreville, Gabon	Morocco	2–0	2–1	2012 Africa Cup of Nations
2	27 January 2012	Stade d'Angondjé, Libreville, Gabon	Niger	1–0	2–1	2012 Africa Cup of Nations
3	8 September 2012	National Stadium, Freetown, Sierra Leone	Sierra Leone	2–2	2–2	2013 Africa Cup of Nations qualification
4	22 January 2013	Royal Bafokeng Stadium, Phokeng, South Africa	Algeria	1–0	1–0	2013 Africa Cup of Nations
5	25 March 2016	Stade Mustapha Ben Jannet, Monastir, Tunisia	Togo	1–0	1–0	2017 Africa Cup of Nations qualification
6	23 January 2017	Stade d'Angondjé, Libreville, Gabon	Zimbabwe	2–0	4–2	2017 Africa Cup of Nations
7	7 October 2017	Stade du 28 Septembre, Conakry, Guinea	Guinea	1–1	4–1	2018 FIFA World Cup qualification
8	7 October 2017	Stade du 28 Septembre, Conakry, Guinea	Guinea	2–1	4–1	2018 FIFA World Cup qualification
9	7 October 2017	Stade du 28 Septembre, Conakry, Guinea	Guinea	4–1	4–1	2018 FIFA World Cup qualification
10	25 June 2019	Suez Stadium, Suez, Egypt	Angola	1–0	1–1	2019 Africa Cup of Nations
11	11 July 2019	Al Salam Stadium, Cairo, Egypt	Madagascar	2–0	3–0	2019 Africa Cup of Nations
12	13 November 2020	Stade Hammadi Agrebi, Tunis, Tunisia	Tanzania	1–0	1–0	2021 Africa Cup of Nations qualification
13	30 November 2021	Ahmed bin Ali Stadium, Al Rayyan, Qatar	Mauritania	5–1	5–1	2021 FIFA Arab Cup
14	10 December 2021	Education City Stadium, Al Rayyan, Qatar	Oman	2–1	2–1	2021 FIFA Arab Cup
15	23 January 2022	Roumdé Adjia Stadium, Garoua, Cameroon	Nigeria	1–0	1–0	2021 Africa Cup of Nations
16	2 June 2022	Stade Hammadi Agrebi, Tunis, Tunisia	Equatorial Guinea	3–0	4–0	2023 Africa Cup of Nations qualification
17	2 June 2022	Stade Hammadi Agrebi, Tunis, Tunisia	Equatorial Guinea	4–0	4–0	2023 Africa Cup of Nations qualification
18	24 March 2023	Stade Hammadi Agrebi, Tunis, Tunisia	Libya	1–0	3–0	2023 Africa Cup of Nations qualification
19	7 September 2023	Stade Hammadi Agrebi, Tunis, Tunisia	Botswana	2–0	3–0	2023 Africa Cup of Nations qualification
20	7 September 2023	Stade Hammadi Agrebi, Tunis, Tunisia	Botswana	3–0	3–0	2023 Africa Cup of Nations qualification
21	17 November 2023	Stade Hammadi Agrebi, Tunis, Tunisia	São Tomé and Príncipe	2–0	4–0	2026 FIFA World Cup qualification
22	21 November 2023	Bingu National Stadium, Lilongwe, Malawi	Malawi	1–0	1–0	2026 FIFA World Cup qualification
23	10 January 2024	Hammadi Agrebi Stadium, Tunis, Tunisia	Cape Verde	2–0	2–0	Friendly

== Honours ==
Espérance de Tunis

- Tunisian Ligue Professionnelle 1: 2008–09, 2009–10, 2010–11, 2011–12
- Tunisian Cup: 2010–11, 2025–26
- CAF Champions League: 2011
- Arab Club Champions Cup: 2008–09

Lekhwiya/Al-Duhail

- Qatar Stars League: 2013–14, 2014–15, 2016–17, 2017–18, 2019–20
- Emir of Qatar Cup: 2016, 2018, 2019
- Qatar Cup: 2015, 2018
- Qatar Super Cup/Shiekh Jassim Cup: 2015, 2016

Tunisia

- Africa Cup of Nations fourth place: 2019
- FIFA Arab Cup runner-up: 2021
- Kirin Cup Soccer: 2022
- African Nations Championship: 2011

Individual

- Tunisian Ligue Professionnelle 1 top scorer: 2011–12
- Qatar Stars League Best player: 2017–18, 2022–23
- Tunisian Footballer of the Year: 2012, 2017
- FIFA Arab Cup Team of the Tournament: 2021
- Africa Cup of Nations Best Goal: 2013

== See also ==
- List of men's footballers with 100 or more international caps
