= Khaled Mouelhi =

Tunisian footballer and manager

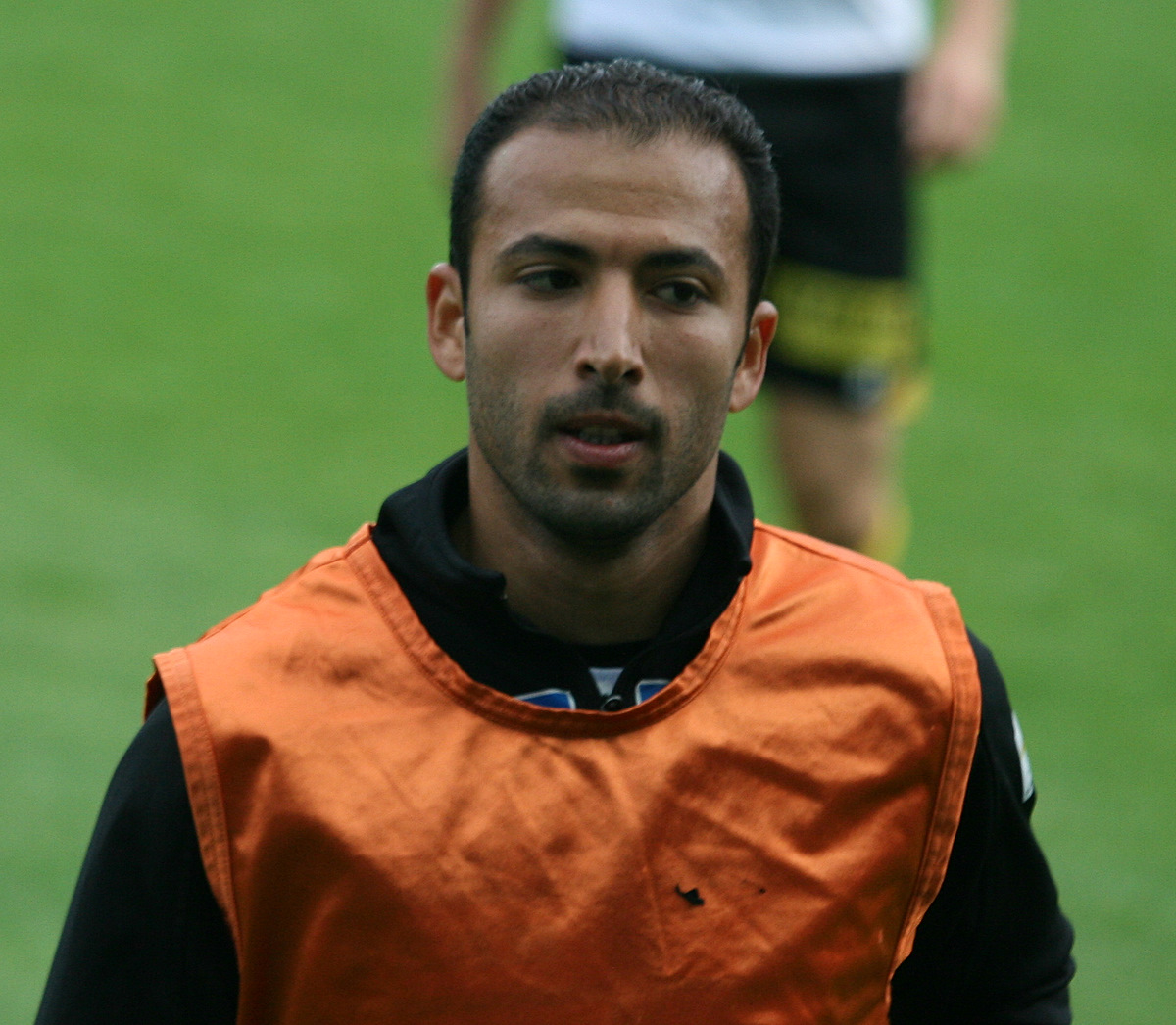
- Mouelhi with Lillestrøm in 2008

Personal information
- Full name: Khaled Mouelhi
- Date of birth: 13 February 1981 (age 45)
- Place of birth: Tunis, Tunisia
- Height: 1.78 m (5 ft 10 in)
- Position: Midfielder

Team information
- Current team: Club de Hammam-Lif (manager)

Senior career*
Years	Team	Apps	(Gls)
2001–2004	Club Africain	117	(19)
2005–2010	Lillestrøm	107	(7)
2011–2014	Espérance de Tunis	62	(6)

International career
2003–2013	Tunisia	15	(1)

Managerial career
- 2015–2016: Espérance de Tunis (assistant)
- 2016: EO Sidi Bouzid
- 2018–2019: JS Kairouan
- 2026-: Club de Hammam-Lif
- * Club domestic league appearances and goals

Khaled "Kiko" Mouelhi (born 13 February 1981 in Tunis) is a retired Tunisian footballer and current manager.

== International career ==
Mouelhi was a member of the Tunisian 2004 Olympic football team, which exited in the first round. The squad finished third in group C, behind group and gold medal winners Argentina and runners-up Australia.

== Coaching career ==
On 2 April 2015, Mouelhi was appointed as the sporting director of Espérance de Tunis. In the August 2015, he changes position to assistant manager under manager Ammar Souayah.

On 30 September 2016, he was then appointed as the manager of EO Sidi Bouzid. Already on 10 December 2016, he decided to resign after poor results.

On 7 December 2018, Mouelhi was announced as the manager of JS Kairouan. He resigned on 19 February 2019.

== Career statistics ==
Season	Club	Division	League		Cup		Total	
Season	Club	Division	Apps	Goals	Apps	Goals	Apps	Goals
2005	Lillestrøm	Tippeligaen	6	0	2	1	8	1
2006	Lillestrøm	Tippeligaen	15	0	2	0	17	0
2007	Lillestrøm	Tippeligaen	20	3	6	1	26	4
2008	Lillestrøm	Tippeligaen	24	1	2	0	26	1
2009	Lillestrøm	Tippeligaen	22	0	1	0	23	0
2010	Lillestrøm	Tippeligaen	20	3	2	0	22	3
2010–11	Espérance	CLP-1	4	0	0	0	4	0
2011–12	Espérance	CLP-1	23	4	0	0	23	4
2012–13	Espérance	CLP-1	14	1	0	0	14	1
2013–14	Espérance	CLP-1	2	0	0	0	2	0
Career Total			150	12	15	2	165	14

== Honours ==
- Lillestrøm: 2007 Norwegian Football Cup
