= Mohamed Bachtobji =

French footballer (born 1980)

Personal information
- Full name: Mohamed Ali Bachtobji
- Date of birth: 1 April 1980 (age 46)
- Place of birth: Dole. France
- Height: 1.85 m (6 ft 1 in)
- Position: Defender

Senior career*
Years	Team	Apps	(Gls)
- Jura Dolois Football
-1999	Nancy	0	(0)
1999–2001	FC Homburg		
2002–2003	Paris Saint-Germain B	0	(0)
2003–2004	Louhans-Cuiseaux FC		
2004–2005	Olympique Noisy-le-Sec		
2005–2006	Jura Dolois Football		
2006–2007	ES Zarzis		
2007–2010	Club Africain		(2+)
2010–2012	Espérance Sportive de Tunis	5+	(1+)
- * Club domestic league appearances and goals

Mohamed Bachtobji (Arabic: محمد الباش طبجي; born 1 April 1980) is a French former professional footballer who played as a defender.
