= Yannick N'Djeng =

Cameroonian footballer (born 1990)

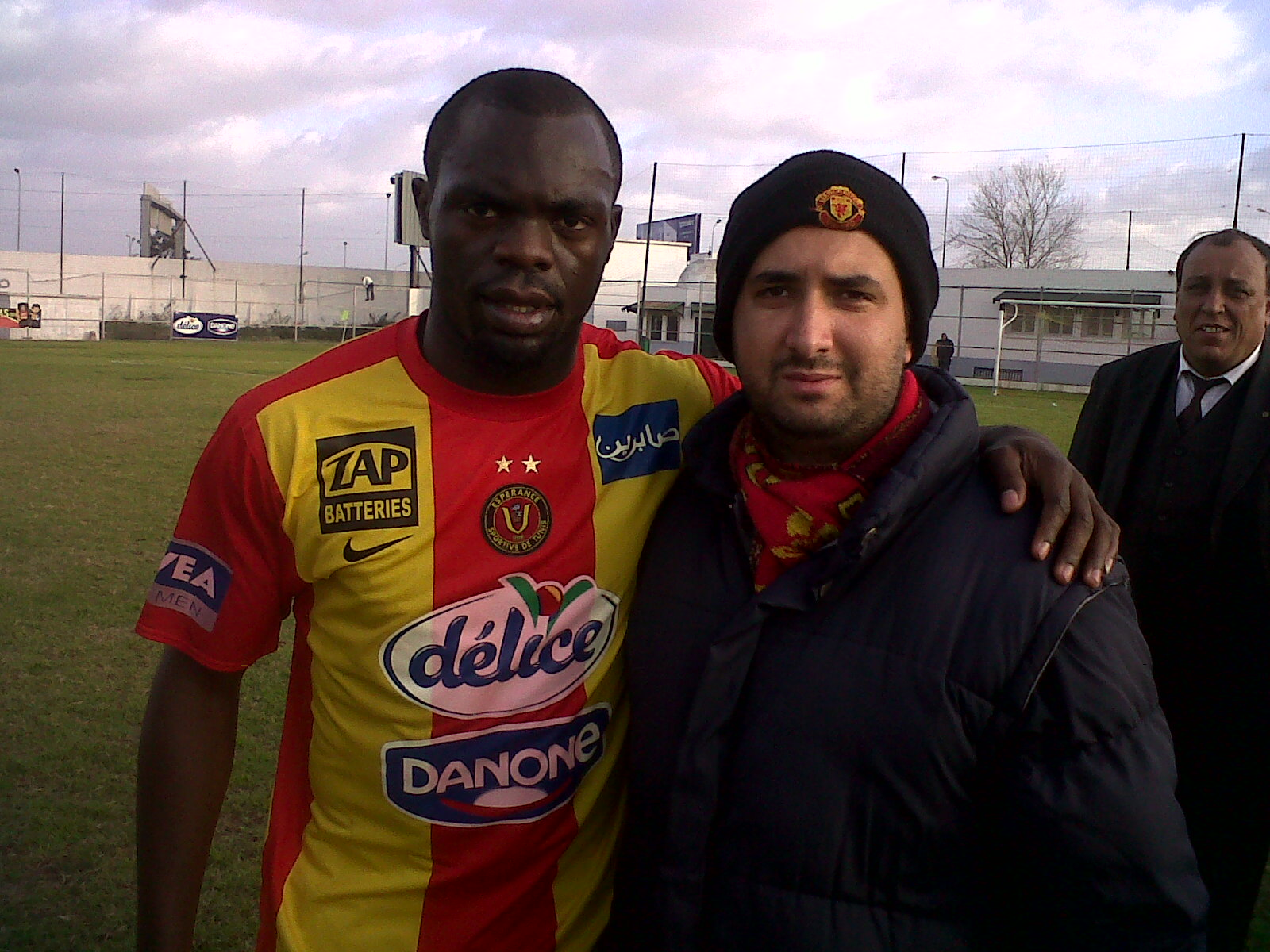
- N'Djeng with Espérance in 2012

Personal information
- Full name: Joseph Yannick N'Djeng
- Date of birth: 11 March 1990 (age 36)
- Place of birth: Yaoundé, Cameroon
- Height: 1.87 m (6 ft 2 in)
- Position: Forward

Youth career
- 2004–2005: Espoirs FC Mimboman

Senior career*
Years	Team	Apps	(Gls)
2005–2008	Canon Yaoundé		
2009–2011	JSM Béjaïa	75	(31)
2011–2013	Espérance	42	(17)
2013	Sion	19	(4)
2013–2016	Espérance	54	(23)
2017	T–Team	35	(15)
2018–2019	Neman Grodno	18	(2)
2019–2020	Al-Yarmouk	11	(4)
2020–2021	AS Fortuna de Mfou		
2021	Al-Khaleej		

International career
2012–2021	Cameroon	8	(1)
- * Club domestic league appearances and goals

Joseph Yannick N'Djeng (born 11 March 1990) is a Cameroonian former professional footballer who played as a forward.

== Club career ==
On 13 November 2008, N'Djeng went on trial with Algerian club JSM Béjaïa and quickly impressed head coach Djamel Menad. On 29 January 2009, he made his debut for the club as a starter in a league game against USM Alger. In his first season, he scored 3 goals in 15 league games.

On 9 July 2011, N'Djeng joined Tunisian club Espérance, signing a three-year contract with the club. The transfer fee was not disclosed but rumored to be around €600,000.

In August 2019, N'Djeng joined Kuwaiti club Al-Yarmouk. His contract was terminated in May 2020.

== International career ==
N'Djeng was capped five times for the Cameroon national team during 2012–2013. In 2021 was reappeared in the Cameroon's squad for 2020 African Nations Championship.

== Career statistics ==
As of 1 November 2017

Appearances and goals by club, season and competition
Club	Season	League			National cup (Note: Includes Algerian Cup, Tunisian President Cup, Piala FA.)		Continental		Total	
Club	Season	Division	Apps	Goals	Apps	Goals	Apps	Goals	Apps	Goals
JSM Béjaïa	2008–09	Algerian Ligue Professionnelle 1	15	3	1	1	4	1	20	5
JSM Béjaïa	2009–10	Algerian Ligue Professionnelle 1	31	14	1	1	0	0	32	15
JSM Béjaïa	2010–11	Algerian Ligue Professionnelle 1	29	14	2	0	0	0	31	14
JSM Béjaïa	Total		75	31	4	2	4	1	83	34
Espérance	2011–12	Tunisian Ligue Professionnelle 1	26	15	0	0	13	4	39	19
Espérance	2012–13	Tunisian Ligue Professionnelle 1	16	2	0	0	0	0	16	2
Espérance	Total		42	17	0	0	13	4	55	21
Sion	2012–13	Swiss Super League	16	2	0	0	0	0	16	2
Sion	2013–14	Swiss Super League	3	0	0	0	0	0	3	0
Sion	Total		19	2	0	0	0	0	19	2
T–Team	2017	Liga Super	9	4	0	0	5	1	14	5
Career total			145	54	4	2	21	6	170	62
