= Hussein Al Idrissy =

Libyan footballer (born 1985)

Personal information
- Full name: Hussein Sultan Mesaud Al Idrissy
- Date of birth: 23 September 1985 (age 41)
- Place of birth: Zuwarah, Libya
- Height: 1.73 m (5 ft 8 in)
- Position: Midfielder

Senior career*
Years	Team	Apps	(Gls)
2004–2009	Aljazeera		
2009–2011	Al Ahli Tripoli		
2011–2013	ES Zarzis	13	(2)
2013–2015	Al-Ahly Benghazi		

International career
2007–2010	Libya	3	(0)
- * Club domestic league appearances and goals

Hussein Sultan Mesaud Al Idrissy (Arabic: حسين الإدريسي; born 23 September 1985) is a Libyan former professional footballer who played as a midfielder. He represented the Libya national team and played club football in Libya and Tunisia, most notably for ES Zarzis in the Tunisian Ligue Professionnelle 1.

== Early life ==
Al Idrissy was born on 23 September 1985 in Zuwarah, Libya. He began his football career in Libya before moving abroad to continue his professional career.

== Club career ==
Al Idrissy started his senior career with Aljazeera SC in 2004, where he played until 2009. He later joined Al Ahli Tripoli, one of Libya's prominent football clubs, where he played from 2009 to 2011.

In 2011, Al Idrissy moved to Tunisia to join ES Zarzis. During his time with the club, he made 13 appearances and scored two goals in the Tunisian Ligue Professionnelle 1.

He returned to Libya in 2013, joining Al-Ahly Benghazi, where he played until 2015.

== International career ==
Al Idrissy represented the Libya national team between 2007 and 2010. He made three international appearances and did not score any goals for the national side.

== Playing style ==
Al Idrissy played primarily as a midfielder. His career included experience in both Libyan domestic football and the Tunisian top division.
