= Maher Ameur =

Tunisian footballer

Personal information
- Date of birth: 7 February 1987 (age 39)
- Height: 1.84 m (6 ft 0 in)
- Position: Forward

Senior career*
| Years | Team | Apps | (Gls) |
| 2006–2009 | Club Africain | | |
| 2009–2010 | JS Kairouan | | |
| 2011–2013 | ES Zarzis | | |
| 2013–2014 | Grombalia Sports | | |
| 2014 | CS Hammam-Lif | | |
| 2015 | ES Métlaoui | | |
- * Club domestic league appearances and goals

Maher Ameur (born 7 February 1987) is a retired Tunisian football forward.
