= Luiz Jeferson Escher =

Brazilian footballer

Personal information
- Full name: Luiz Jeferson Escher
- Date of birth: 28 June 1987 (age 39)
- Place of birth: Alecrim, Rio Grande do Sul, Brazil
- Position: Forward

Team information
- Current team: Kawkab Marrakech

Senior career*
Years	Team	Apps	(Gls)
2007–2008	Matsubara		
2008–2010	Kawkab Marrakech		
2010–2011	Wydad Casablanca	25	(3)
2011	Kawkab Marrakech		
2011–2014	MAS Fez	48	(9)
2014–	Kawkab Marrakech	2	(0)
- * Club domestic league appearances and goals as of 1 April 2014

Luiz Jeferson Escher (born 28 June 1987, in Alecrim) is a Brazilian professional footballer, who plays as a forward for Moroccan side Kawkab Marrakech.

== Personal life ==
This year his wife and daughter moved to Marrakech in Morocco.
