= Didier Lebri =

Ivorian footballer

Personal information
- Full name: Didier Lebri Grekou
- Date of birth: 28 December 1988 (age 37)
- Height: 1.77 m (5 ft 10 in)
- Position: Forward

Senior career*
Years	Team	Apps	(Gls)
–2008	US Ouakam		
2008–2010	Jendouba Sport		
2010–2012	AS Marsa		
2012	Espérance de Tunis		
2012–2013	CS Sfaxien		
2014	FC Monthey		
2014–2015	CS Hammam-Lif		
2015–2017	Al-Merrikh SC		
2017	Bloemfontein Celtic		
2017–2018	EEPCO		
2018–2019	Jimma Aba Jifar		
2019–2021	Shire Endaselassie		
- * Club domestic league appearances and goals

Didier Lebri (born 28 December 1988) is an Ivorian football striker.
