= 2012–13 Tunisian Ligue Professionnelle 1 =

Tunisian Ligue Professionnelle 1
- Season: 2012–13
- Dates: 10 November 2012 – 29 May 2013
- Champions: CS Sfaxien
- Relegated: Olympique du Kef; ES Hammam-Sousse; ES Zarzis
- Champions League: CS Sfaxien; Espérance de Tunis
- Confederation Cup: Etoile du Sahel; CA Bizertin
- Matches: 125
- Goals: 261 (2.09 per match)
- Top goalscorer: Haythem Jouini (8 goals)
- Biggest home win: ESS 5-1 ESHS; EST 5-1 JSK
- Biggest away win: SG 1-6 ESS
- Highest scoring: SG 1-6 ESS

The 2012–13 Tunisian Ligue Professionnelle 1 (Tunisian Professional League) season was the 58th season of top-tier football in Tunisia. The competition began on 10 November 2012 and was scheduled to conclude in June 2013. The defending champions from the previous season were Espérance Sportive de Tunis.

== Team and format changes ==
Last season two teams were relegated as usual (AS Gabès and ES Beni-Khalled), with two teams promoted from the Tunisian Ligue Professionnelle 2 to replace them (Olympique du Kef and Stade Gabèsien). However, in a change from previous seasons, the league was split into two groups of 8 teams.

== Teams and venues ==
=== Group A ===
Location of teams in 2012–13 Tunisian Ligue Professionelle 1
Green - Group A, Red - Group B

Clubs	Last promotion	Position in 2011–12	Venue	Capacity	Location	Premier League titles
Espérance ST	1936	1	El-Menzah stadium	60,000	Tunis	25
Club Athletique Bizertin	1990	2	October 15th stadium	20,000	Bizerte	4
AS Marsa	2010	5	Stade Abdelaziz Chtioui	6,000	La Marsa	
Club Africain	1937	6	Olympic Stadium of Rades	45,000	Tunis	12
Olympique Béja	2006	8	Boujemaa El-Kemiti stadium	8,000	Béja	
JS Kairouan	2009	12	Stade Ali Zouaoui	5,000	Kairouan	1
ES Zarzis	2009	13	Stade Jlidi	7,000	Zarzis	
Olympique du Kef	2012	1 (CPL-2)	Stade 7 Novembre du Kef	15,000	El Kef	

=== Group B ===
Clubs	Last promotion	Position in 2011–12	Venue	Capacity	Location	Premier League titles
CS Sfaxien	1939	3	Taïeb Mhiri's stadium	11,000	Sfax	7
Etoile Sahel	1931	4	Sousse's Olympic stadium	25,000	Sousse	9
EGS Gafsa	2005	7	Stade du 7 Novembre de Gafsa	12,000	Gafsa	
US Monastir	2011	9	Stade Mustapha Ben Jannet	25,000	Monastir	
Stade Tunisien	1955	10	Chedli Zouiten's stadium	18,000	Le Bardo	4
ES Hammam-Sousse	2008	11	Stade Municipal Bou Ali-Lahouar	7,000	Hammam Sousse	
CS Hammam-Lif	2006	14	Bou Kornine stadium	8,000	Hammam Lif	4
Stade Gabèsien	2012	2 (CPL-2)	Stade du Zrig	15,000	Gabès	

== Results ==
=== Group A ===
==== Group A table ====
Pos	Team	Pld	W	D	L	GF	GA	GD	Pts	Qualification or relegation
1	Espérance de Tunis	14	9	2	3	27	12	+15	29	Qualification to the 2013 Championship Playoffs
2	Club Africain	14	8	5	1	16	8	+8	29	Qualification to the 2013 Championship Playoffs
3	CA Bizertin	14	8	5	1	18	5	+13	29	2014 CAF Confederation Cup (Note: 2012–13 Tunisian Cup winners)
4	AS Marsa	14	5	4	5	16	15	+1	19	
5	JS Kairouan	14	3	6	5	10	17	−7	15	
6	Olympique Béja	14	3	4	7	11	16	−5	13	
7	ES Zarzis (R)	14	2	6	6	9	16	−7	12	Relegation to the 2013–14 Tunisian Ligue 2
8	Olympique du Kef (R)	14	1	2	11	7	25	−18	5	Relegation to the 2013–14 Tunisian Ligue 2

Updated to match(es) played on 14 April 2013. Source: Ligue 1 Group A
Rules for classification: 1) points; 2) goal difference; 3) number of goals scored.
(R) Relegated

==== Group A result table ====
Home \ Away	ASM	CA	CAB	EST	ESZ	JSK	OB	OK
AS Marsa	—	0–1	0–2	2–2	1–1	0–0	1–0	2–1
Club Africain	2–1	—	0–0	2–1	1–1	2–1	3–1	2–0
CA Bizertin	2–1	0–0	—	0–1	2–1	1–1	2–0	4–0
ES Tunis	0–0	3–1	0–1	—	2–1	5–1	2–1	3–0
ES Zarzis	0–2	0–0	1–1	1–0	—	0–2	1–1	2–1
JS Kairouan	1–3	0–0	0–2	0–2	0–0	—	1–0	1–0
Olympique Béja	2–1	0–1	0–0	1–2	2–0	1–1	—	1–0
Olympique du Kef	1–2	0–1	0–1	1–4	1–0	1–1	1–1	—

Updated to match(es) played on April 14, 2013. Source: Ligue 1 Group A
Legend: Blue = home team win; Yellow = draw; Red = away team win.

=== Group B ===
==== Group B table ====
Pos	Team	Pld	W	D	L	GF	GA	GD	Pts	Qualification or relegation
1	CS Sfaxien	14	8	4	2	20	9	+11	28	Qualification to the 2013 Championship Playoffs
2	Etoile du Sahel	14	7	4	3	23	12	+11	25	Qualification to the 2013 Championship Playoffs
3	US Monastir	14	5	6	3	17	12	+5	21	
4	Stade Tunisien	14	4	5	5	11	11	0	17	
5	CS Hammam-Lif	14	4	5	5	11	13	−2	17	
6	Stade Gabèsien	14	3	6	5	13	19	−6	15	
7	EGS Gafsa (O)	14	4	2	8	12	18	−6	14	
8	ES Hammam-Sousse (R)	14	3	4	7	11	24	−13	13	Relegation to the 2013–14 Tunisian Ligue 2

Updated to match(es) played on 14 April 2013. Source: Ligue 1 Group B
Rules for classification: 1) points; 2) goal difference; 3) number of goals scored.
(O) Play-off winners; (R) Relegated

==== Group B result table ====
Home \ Away	CSHL	CSS	EGSG	ESHS	ESS	SG	ST	USM
CS Hammam-Lif	—	1–3	1–0	3–1	1–0	1–1	1–0	0–1
CS Sfaxien	1–0	—	3–1	0–0	1–1	1–1	2–0	1–1
EGS Gafsa	1–1	1–0	—	4–1	0–0	1–0	1–3	2–1
ES Hammam-Sousse	0–0	1–2	1–0	—	1–0	1–1	1–1	0–1
Étoile du Sahel	3–1	2–0	1–0	5–1	—	2–1	2–1	0–0
Stade Gabèsien	0–0	0–2	2–1	3–1	1–6	—	1–0	1–1
Stade Tunisien	0–0	0–2	1–0	3–0	0–0	1–0	—	1–1
US Monastir	2–1	0–2	3–0	1–2	4–1	1–1	0–0	—

Updated to match(es) played on April 14, 2013. Source: Ligue 1 Group B
Legend: Blue = home team win; Yellow = draw; Red = away team win.

== Championship playoffs ==
=== League table ===
Pos	Team	Pld	W	D	L	GF	GA	GD	Pts	Qualification
1	CS Sfaxien (C)	6	4	1	1	11	7	+4	13	2014 CAF Champions League
2	Espérance de Tunis	6	4	0	2	8	6	+2	12	2014 CAF Champions League
3	Etoile du Sahel	6	3	0	3	6	6	0	9	2014 CAF Confederation Cup
4	Club Africain	6	0	1	5	2	8	−6	1	

Updated to match(es) played on 29 May 2013. Source: Ligue 1 Championship Playoffs
Rules for classification: 1) points; 2) goal difference; 3) number of goals scored.
(C) Champions

=== Result table ===
Home \ Away	CA	CSS	EST	ESS
Club Africain	—	1–1	0–1	0–2
CS Sfaxien	2–1	—	2–3	1–0
Espérance de Tunis	1–0	1–2	—	2–1
Etoile du Sahel	1–0	1–3	1–0	—

Updated to match(es) played on May 29, 2013. Source: Ligue 1 Championship Playoffs
Legend: Blue = home team win; Yellow = draw; Red = away team win.

== Relegation playoff ==
April 24, 2013
14:00 UTC+01

EGS Gafsa	1–1	ES Zarzis
Mahjoubi 36'	Report	Slimane 86'
Penalties
	4–2

Stade El Menzah, Tunis
Referee: Mourad Ben Hamza

ES Zarzis Relegated to 2013–14 Tunisian Ligue 2
