= 2011–12 Tunisian Ligue Professionnelle 1 =

Tunisian Ligue Professionnelle 1
- Season: 2011–12
- Champions: Espérance de Tunis
- Relegated: AS Gabès; ES Beni-Khalled
- Champions League: Espérance de Tunis; Club Athletique Bizertin
- Confederation Cup: CS Sfaxien; Etoile du Sahel
- Matches: 240
- Goals: 560 (2.33 per match)
- Top goalscorer: Youssef Msakni (17 goals)
- Biggest home win: EST 7–0 ESHS
- Biggest away win: CSHL 0–4 ESS
- Highest scoring: EST 7–0 ESHS; ASM 5–2 CSHL; CAB 5–2 ESBK; JSK 5–2 USM; OB 2–5 JSK

The 2011–12 Tunisian Ligue Professionnelle 1 (Tunisian Professional League) season was the 57th season of top-tier football in Tunisia. The competition began on 4 November 2011, and ended on 30 September 2012. The defending champions from the previous season are Espérance de Tunis.

This is the first full season held after the Tunisian Revolution.

== Team movements ==
=== Teams promoted from CPL-2 ===
- US Monastir
- ES Beni-Khalled

== Teams and venues ==
Location of teams in 2011–12 Tunisian Ligue Professionelle 1

| Clubs | Last promotion | Position in 2010–11 | Venue | Capacity | Location | Premier League titles |
|---|---|---|---|---|---|---|
| Espérance ST | 1936 | 1 | Olympic Stadium of Rades | 60,000 | Tunis | 24 |
| Etoile Sahel | 1931 | 2 | Sousse's Olympic stadium | 25,000 | Sousse | 9 |
| CS Sfaxien | 1939 | 3 | Taïeb Mhiri's stadium | 11,000 | Sfax | 7 |
| Club Africain | 1937 | 4 | El-Menzah stadium | 45,000 | Tunis | 12 |
| Club Athletique Bizertin | 1990 | 5 | October 15th stadium | 20,000 | Bizerte | 4 |
| CS Hammam-Lif | 2006 | 6 | Bou Kornine stadium | 8,000 | Hammam Lif | 4 |
| Stade tunisien | 1955 | 7 | Chedli Zouiten's stadium | 18,000 | Le Bardo | 4 |
| EGS Gafsa | 2005 | 8 | Stade olympique de Gafsa | 7,000 | Gafsa | |
| JS Kairouan | 2009 | 9 | Stade Ali Zouaoui | 5,000 | Kairouan | 1 |
| Olympique Béja | 2006 | 10 | Boujemaa El-Kemiti stadium | 8,000 | Béja | |
| AS Marsa | 2010 | 11 | Stade Abdelaziz Chtioui | 6,000 | La Marsa | |
| ES Zarzis | 2009 | 12 | Stade Jlidi | 7,000 | Zarzis | |
| AS Gabès | 2010 | 13 | Stade du Zrig | 15,000 | Gabès | |
| ES Hammam-Sousse | 2008 | 14 | Stade Municipal Bou Ali-Lahouar | 7,000 | Hammam Sousse | |
| US Monastir | 2011 | 1 (CPL-2) | Stade Mustapha Ben Jannet | 25,000 | Monastir | |
| ES Beni-Khalled | 2011 | 2 (CPL-2) | Stade de Béni Khalled | 4,000 | Béni Khalled | |

== Results ==
=== League table ===
| Pos | Team | Pld | W | D | L | GF | GA | GD | Pts | Qualification or relegation |
|---|---|---|---|---|---|---|---|---|---|---|
| 1 | Espérance de Tunis | 30 | 22 | 3 | 5 | 61 | 22 | +39 | 69 | Qualification for Champions League |
| 2 | CA Bizertin | 30 | 20 | 5 | 5 | 54 | 25 | +29 | 65 | Qualification for Champions League |
| 3 | CS Sfaxien | 30 | 15 | 11 | 4 | 47 | 26 | +21 | 56 | Qualification for Confederation Cup |
| 4 | Etoile du Sahel | 30 | 13 | 10 | 7 | 33 | 22 | +11 | 49 | Qualification for Confederation Cup |
| 5 | AS Marsa | 30 | 12 | 11 | 7 | 39 | 28 | +11 | 47 | |
| 6 | Club Africain | 30 | 10 | 12 | 8 | 36 | 30 | +6 | 42 | |
| 7 | EGS Gafsa | 30 | 9 | 9 | 12 | 27 | 38 | −11 | 36 | |
| 8 | Olympique Béja | 30 | 9 | 9 | 12 | 31 | 35 | −4 | 36 | |
| 9 | US Monastir | 30 | 7 | 15 | 8 | 31 | 34 | −3 | 36 | |
| 10 | Stade Tunisien | 30 | 9 | 9 | 12 | 30 | 37 | −7 | 36 | |
| 11 | ES Hammam-Sousse | 30 | 8 | 11 | 11 | 29 | 37 | −8 | 35 | |
| 12 | JS Kairouan | 30 | 8 | 9 | 13 | 29 | 38 | −9 | 33 | |
| 13 | ES Zarzis | 30 | 7 | 10 | 13 | 36 | 52 | −16 | 31 | |
| 14 | CS Hammam-Lif | 30 | 8 | 7 | 15 | 29 | 47 | −18 | 31 | |
| 15 | AS Gabès | 30 | 4 | 10 | 16 | 24 | 45 | −21 | 22 | Relegation to Ligue 2 |
| 16 | ES Beni-Khalled | 30 | 4 | 9 | 17 | 24 | 44 | −20 | 21 | Relegation to Ligue 2 |

Source: Ligue 1
Rules for classification: 1) points; 2) head-to-head points; 3) head-to-head goal difference; 4) goal difference; 5) total goals; 6) fairplay ranking; 7) playoff.

=== Result table ===
| Home \ Away | ASM | ASG | CA | CAB | CSHL | CSS | EGSG | EST | ESZ | ESHS | ESBK | ESS | JSK | OB | ST | USM |
|---|---|---|---|---|---|---|---|---|---|---|---|---|---|---|---|---|
| AS Marsa | — | 2–0 | 0–0 | 1–1 | 5–2 | 2–2 | 1–0 | 1–2 | 1–0 | 0–0 | 3–1 | 0–0 | 1–0 | 2–1 | 0–0 | 2–0 |
| AS Gabès | 3–2 | — | 2–1 | 0–3 | 1–1 | 0–0 | 0–0 | 0–2 | 1–1 | 1–2 | 0–0 | 1–2 | 2–0 | 2–2 | 0–1 | 1–1 |
| Club Africain | 1–1 | 0–2 | — | 2–2 | 2–0 | 1–1 | 2–1 | 1–2 | 0–0 | 1–0 | 3–0 | 0–0 | 2–1 | 0–0 | 4–0 | 1–1 |
| CA Bizertin | 1–2 | 2–1 | 2–1 | — | 1–0 | 2–2 | 4–1 | 2–1 | 2–0 | 2–1 | 5–2 | 1–0 | 3–0 | 2–1 | 1–1 | 2–0 |
| CS Hammam-Lif | 2–4 | 2–0 | 1–1 | 1–4 | — | 2–1 | 4–1 | 0–2 | 1–2 | 1–1 | 1–0 | 0–4 | 2–1 | 2–1 | 1–0 | 1–0 |
| CS Sfaxien | 1–1 | 4–0 | 2–1 | 1–0 | 2–1 | — | 3–0 | 2–1 | 5–1 | 1–0 | 2–1 | 1–1 | 3–0 | 0–0 | 2–1 | 2–2 |
| EGS Gafsa | 3–2 | 1–0 | 2–2 | 2–1 | 1–0 | 0–0 | — | 1–1 | 2–1 | 1–0 | 4–2 | 0–2 | 0–0 | 2–1 | 1–1 | 1–1 |
| Espérance de Tunis | 1–0 | 4–1 | 3–2 | 0–1 | 4–0 | 1–0 | 1–0 | — | 5–0 | 7–0 | 1–0 | 1–0 | 2–0 | 3–1 | 2–1 | 3–0 |
| ES Zarzis | 1–1 | 1–1 | 2–2 | 0–1 | 1–1 | 1–3 | 2–1 | 2–2 | — | 1–0 | 1–2 | 2–3 | 2–0 | 1–2 | 3–2 | 3–2 |
| ES Hammam-Sousse | 2–1 | 1–1 | 1–1 | 1–3 | 1–0 | 1–1 | 2–1 | 0–2 | 2–0 | — | 3–2 | 0–0 | 0–0 | 1–1 | 4–1 | 0–0 |
| ES Beni-Khalled | 1–1 | 2–0 | 0–1 | 1–2 | 1–1 | 0–1 | 3–0 | 0–1 | 1–2 | 2–1 | — | 0–0 | 1–1 | 0–1 | 1–1 | 0–0 |
| Étoile du Sahel | 0–1 | 2–2 | 0–1 | 1–0 | 0–0 | 3–1 | 1–0 | 0–2 | 2–1 | 3–1 | 0–0 | — | 2–1 | 2–0 | 1–0 | 0–0 |
| JS Kairouan | 0–0 | 2–1 | 1–2 | 1–0 | 1–0 | 0–1 | 0–0 | 0–2 | 1–1 | 1–0 | 1–0 | 2–2 | — | 2–1 | 1–1 | 5–2 |
| Olympique Béja | 1–0 | 1–0 | 0–1 | 0–0 | 2–0 | 1–2 | 1–0 | 3–1 | 1–1 | 1–1 | 1–0 | 1–2 | 2–5 | — | 1–1 | 0–0 |
| Stade Tunisien | 0–1 | 2–1 | 2–0 | 1–2 | 1–1 | 1–0 | 0–1 | 3–1 | 3–1 | 0–2 | 1–1 | 1–0 | 1–0 | 1–3 | — | 1–1 |
| US Monastir | 2–1 | 1–0 | 1–0 | 0–2 | 2–1 | 1–1 | 0–0 | 1–1 | 2–2 | 1–1 | 5–0 | 2–0 | 2–2 | 1–0 | 0–1 | — |

Updated to match(es) played on September 30, 2012. Source: Ligue 1
Legend: Blue = home team win; Yellow = draw; Red = away team win.

== Top goalscorers ==
| Rank | Player | Club | Goals |
|---|---|---|---|
| 1 | (Tunisia) Youssef Msakni | Espérance de Tunis | 17 |
| 2 | (Cameroon) Yannick N'Djeng | Espérance de Tunis | 15 |
| 3 | (Libya) Ahmed Zuway | CA Bizertin | 13 |
| 3 | (Ivory Coast) Didier Lebri | AS Marsa / Espérance de Tunis | 13 |
| 5 | (Tunisia) Maher Ameur | ES Zarzis | 11 |
| 5 | (Tunisia) Nour Hadhria | CA Bizertin | 11 |
| 7 | (Chad) Ezechiel N'Douassel | Club Africain | 9 |

== Television rights ==
The Communication bureau of the FTF attributed the broadcasting rights of the Tunisian Ligue Professionnelle 1 to ERTT (Tunisian Radio and Television Establishment with its two channels Tunis7 and Tunisie 21).
