= 2010–11 Tunisian Ligue Professionnelle 1 =

Tunisian Ligue Professionnelle 1
- Season: 2010–11
- Champions: Espérance de Tunis
- Relegated: None (Ligue 1 extended to 16 teams in 2011–12)
- Champions League: Espérance de Tunis; Etoile du Sahel
- Confederation Cup: CS Sfaxien; Club Africain
- Matches: 182
- Goals: 405 (2.23 per match)
- Top goalscorer: Ahmed Akaïchi (14 goals)
- Biggest home win: EST 5–0 ST
- Biggest away win: ASG 1–4 CAB; CSHL 1–4 JSK; ESHS 1–4 CA
- Highest scoring: EGSG 4–4 CA

The 2010–11 Tunisian Ligue Professionnelle 1(Tunisian Professional League) season was the 56th season of top-tier football in Tunisia. The competition began on 24 July 2010, and will conclude on 8 May 2011. The defending champions from the previous season are Espérance Sportive de Tunis. No teams were relegated as Ligue 1 was to be extended to 16 teams starting from the 2011–12 season.

== Team movements ==
=== Teams relegated to CPL-2 ===
- AS Kasserine
- US Monastir

=== Teams promoted from CPL-2 ===
- AS Gabès
- AS Marsa

== Teams and venues ==
Location of teams in 2010–11 Tunisian Ligue Professionelle 1

Clubs	Venue	Capacity
AS Gabès	Stade du Zrig	15.000
AS Marsa	Stade Abdelaziz Chtioui	6.000
Club Africain	El-Menzah stadium	45.000
Club Athletique Bizertin	October 15th stadium	20.000
CS Hammam-Lif	Bou Kornine stadium	8.000
Club Sportif Sfaxien	Taïeb Mhiri's stadium	22.000
El-Gawafel Sportives de Gafsa	Stade 7 November Gafsa	12.000
Espoir Sportif de Hammam-Sousse	BouAli Lahwar stadium	6.500
Étoile Sportive du Sahel	Sousse's Olympic stadium	30.000
Espérance Sportive de Tunis	Olympic Stadium of Rades	65.000
Espérance Sportive de Tunis	El-Menzah stadium	45.000
Espérance Sportive de Zarzis	Stade Jlidi	8.000
JS Kairouan	Stade Ali Zouaoui	15.000
Olympique de Béja	Boujemaa El-Kemiti stadium	8.000
Stade Tunisien	Chedli Zouiten's stadium	20.000

== Results ==
=== League table ===
Pos	Team	Pld	W	D	L	GF	GA	GD	Pts	Qualification or relegation
1	Espérance de Tunis	26	20	4	2	50	18	+32	64	Qualification to the 2012 CAF Champions League
2	Etoile du Sahel	26	19	2	5	49	24	+25	59	Qualification to the 2012 CAF Champions League
3	CS Sfaxien	26	12	8	6	32	23	+9	44	Qualification to the 2012 CAF Confederation Cup
4	Club Africain	26	8	11	7	32	27	+5	35	Qualification to the 2012 CAF Confederation Cup
5	CA Bizertin	26	10	5	11	23	29	−6	35	
6	CS Hammam-Lif	26	9	7	10	23	31	−8	34	
7	Stade Tunisien	26	8	9	9	26	30	−4	33	
8	EGS Gafsa	26	8	8	10	28	34	−6	32	
9	JS Kairouan	26	8	7	11	28	29	−1	31	
10	Olympique Béja	26	6	11	9	25	29	−4	29	
11	AS Marsa	26	7	8	11	26	34	−8	29	
12	ES Zarzis	26	6	9	11	22	24	−2	27	
13	AS Gabès	26	6	6	14	19	32	−13	24	
14	ES Hammam-Sousse	26	5	5	16	19	38	−19	20	

Updated to match(es) played on 10 July 2011. Source: Ligue 1
Rules for classification: 1) points; 2) goal difference; 3) number of goals scored.

=== Result table ===
Home \ Away	ASG	ASM	CA	CAB	CSHL	CSS	EGSG	EST	ESZ	ESHS	ESS	JSK	OB	ST
AS Gabès	—	1–0	1–1	1–4	2–0	0–1	2–0	2–1	0–0	0–0	0–2	0–0	1–1	3–0
AS Marsa	2–1	—	1–0	0–0	1–1	1–2	2–0	1–3	3–1	2–2	2–4	1–0	0–0	0–2
Club Africain	2–0	0–0	—	2–2	2–0	0–2	1–0	2–2	1–2	2–1	2–0	0–0	1–0	2–1
CA Bizertin	2–0	0–0	2–1	—	0–0	0–3	2–0	0–1	1–0	2–0	0–2	2–1	1–0	0–0
CS Hammam-Lif	1–0	3–1	0–0	1–0	—	1–1	3–1	0–1	1–0	1–0	0–2	1–4	1–0	2–1
CS Sfaxien	2–1	1–2	0–0	1–0	3–1	—	1–1	0–3	1–1	2–1	4–1	1–1	0–0	1–1
EGS Gafsa	1–0	0–0	4–4	1–0	2–1	1–0	—	0–1	2–1	3–1	1–1	2–0	2–2	1–2
Espérance de Tunis	2–0	2–1	2–1	3–0	3–1	3–1	0–0	—	1–0	4–0	0–0	2–1	1–1	5–0
ES Zarzis	3–1	1–1	0–0	1–2	4–1	0–0	3–0	1–2	—	0–1	0–2	1–0	2–0	0–0
ES Hammam-Sousse	2–0	0–3	1–4	1–2	1–0	0–1	1–1	0–1	1–1	—	0–2	2–0	1–0	0–1
Etoile du Sahel	3–1	3–0	2–1	3–0	0–1	1–0	1–0	5–1	1–0	2–1	—	3–2	1–2	2–0
JS Kairouan	0–0	3–1	1–0	1–0	2–2	2–1	2–1	1–2	2–0	1–0	1–2	—	1–1	1–2
Olympique Béja	0–1	2–1	2–2	3–1	0–0	0–1	2–2	0–2	0–0	3–2	2–3	1–0	—	1–1
Stade Tunisien	2–1	2–0	1–1	3–0	0–0	1–2	1–2	0–2	0–0	0–0	3–1	1–1	1–2	—

Updated to match(es) played on July 10, 2011. Source: Ligue 1
Legend: Blue = home team win; Yellow = draw; Red = away team win.

== Top goalscorers ==
Rank	Player	Team	Goals
1	(Tunisia) Ahmed Akaïchi	Etoile du Sahel	14
2	(Tunisia) Oussama Darragi	Espérance de Tunis	10
2	(Brazil) Danilo Petrolli Bueno	Etoile du Sahel	10
4	(Tunisia) Ayoub Kramti	EGS Gafsa	9
4	(Tunisia) Youssef Msakni	Espérance de Tunis	9
6	(Tunisia) Heithem Ben Salem	Club Athletique Bizertin	7
6	(Nigeria) Michael Eneramo	Espérance de Tunis	7
6	(Tunisia) Slema Kazdeoui	JS Kairouan	7
9	(Tunisia) Bilel Ben Messaoud	AS Marsa	6
9	(Tunisia) Lamjed Chehoudi	Etoile du Sahel	6
9	(Tunisia) Youssef Mouihbi	Club Africain	6
9	(Tunisia) Amir Omrani	EGS Gafsa	6
9	(Tunisia) Chaker Reguiî	ES Zarzis	6
9	(Tunisia) Hamza Younes	CS Sfaxien	6
15	(Ghana) Kari Kari	CS Hammam-Lif	5

Update: 6 July 2011 Source: Soccerway
