= 15 October Stadium =

Multi-use stadium in Tunisia

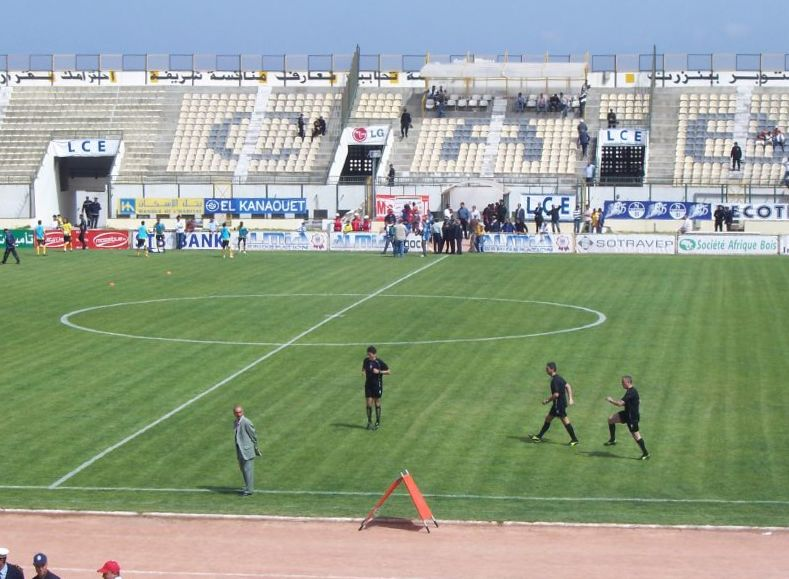
- Interactive map of 15 October Stadium
- Address: 27, avenue Hédi-Chaker 7000
- Location: Bizerte, Tunisia
- Coordinates: 37°16′44″N 9°51′56″E
- Owner: Government of Tunisia
- Capacity: 20,000
- Surface: Grass

Construction
- Opened: 1990
- Renovated: 2004

Tenant
- CA Bizertin

The 15 October Stadium (Arabic: ملعب 15 أكتوبر) is a multi-use stadium in Bizerte, Tunisia (65 kilometres (40 mi) north-west of Tunis). It has a capacity of 20,000 seats of which 4,000 are covered. The stadium hosted matches of the 2004 African Cup of Nations, which has also been won by the Tunisian team, but it is usually used by CA Bizertin.

The stadium is named encrypted the date corresponding to the evacuation of the last foreign soldier of independent Tunisia, on 15 October 1963 after Bizerte crisis. The space devoted to various media features 170 workstations.
