= Mauritania at the Africa Cup of Nations =

Mauritania has participated in the Africa Cup of Nations three times. They qualified for the first time on 18 November 2018, for the 2019 tournament.

== Overall record ==
Africa Cup of Nations record
Year	Round	Position	Pld	W	D*	L	GF	GA
(Sudan) 1957 – (United Arab Republic) 1959	Part of France							
(Ethiopia) 1962 – (Egypt) 1974	Not affiliated to CAF							
(Ethiopia) 1976 – (Ghana) 1978	Did not enter							
(Nigeria) 1980 – (Libya) 1982	Did not qualify							
(Ivory Coast) 1984	Did not enter							
(Egypt) 1986	Did not qualify							
(Morocco) 1988	Did not enter							
(Algeria) 1990	Withdrew							
(Senegal) 1992	Did not qualify							
(Tunisia) 1994	Withdrew							
(South Africa) 1996 – (Burkina Faso) 1998	Did not qualify							
(Ghana) (Nigeria) 2000	Withdrew							
(Mali) 2002 – (Angola) 2010	Did not qualify							
(Equatorial Guinea) (Gabon) 2012	Withdrew							
(South Africa) 2013	Did not enter							
(Equatorial Guinea) 2015 – (Gabon) 2017	Did not qualify							
(Egypt) 2019	Group stage	19th	3	0	2	1	1	4
(Cameroon) 2021	Group stage	24th	3	0	0	3	0	7
(Ivory Coast) 2023	Round of 16	16th	4	1	0	3	3	5
(Morocco) 2025	Did not qualify							
(Kenya) (Tanzania) (Uganda) 2027	To be determined							
Total	Round of 16	3/35	10	1	2	7	4	16

== By match ==
Year	Stage	Date	Opponent	Result	Mauritania scorers
(Egypt) 2019	Group stage	24 June 2019	Mali	1–4	El Hacen 72' (pen.)
(Egypt) 2019	Group stage	29 June 2019	Angola	0–0	—
(Egypt) 2019	Group stage	2 July 2019	Tunisia	0–0	—
(Cameroon) 2021	Group stage	12 January 2022	Gambia	0–1	—
(Cameroon) 2021	Group stage	16 January 2022	Tunisia	0–4	—
(Cameroon) 2021	Group stage	20 January 2022	Mali	0–2	—
(Ivory Coast) 2023	Group stage	16 January 2024	Burkina Faso	0–1	—
(Ivory Coast) 2023	Group stage	20 January 2024	Angola	2–3	Amar 43' Koita 58'
(Ivory Coast) 2023	Group stage	23 January 2024	Algeria	1–0	Yali 37'
(Ivory Coast) 2023	Round of 16	29 January 2024	Cape Verde	0–1	—

== Tournaments ==
=== 2019 Africa Cup of Nations ===
==== Group stage ====
Pos	Team	Pld	W	D	L	GF	GA	GD	Pts	Qualification
1	Mali	3	2	1	0	6	2	+4	7	Advance to knockout stage
2	Tunisia	3	0	3	0	2	2	0	3	Advance to knockout stage
3	Angola	3	0	2	1	1	2	−1	2	
4	Mauritania	3	0	2	1	1	4	−3	2	

Source: CAF
24 June 2019
22:00

Mali	4–1	Mauritania
Diaby 37'; Marega 45' (pen.); A. Traoré II 55'; A. Traoré I 74'	Report	El Hacen 72' (pen.)

Suez Stadium, Suez
Attendance: 6,202
Referee: Jean-Jacques Ndala (DR Congo)

29 June 2019
16:30

Mauritania	0–0	Angola
	Report

Suez Stadium, Suez
Attendance: 10,120
Referee: Ibrahim Nour El Din (Egypt)

2 July 2019
21:00

Mauritania	0–0	Tunisia
	Report

Suez Stadium, Suez
Attendance: 7,732
Referee: Louis Hakizimana (Rwanda)

=== 2021 Africa Cup of Nations ===
==== Group stage ====
Pos	Team	Pld	W	D	L	GF	GA	GD	Pts	Qualification
1	Mali	3	2	1	0	4	1	+3	7	Advance to knockout stage
2	Gambia	3	2	1	0	3	1	+2	7	Advance to knockout stage
3	Tunisia	3	1	0	2	4	2	+2	3	Advance to knockout stage
4	Mauritania	3	0	0	3	0	7	−7	0	

Source: CAF
12 January 2022
17:45 (Note: The Mauritania v Gambia match was originally scheduled to kick-off at 17:00, but was delayed to 17:45 due to timing issues in the Tunisia v Mali match.)

Mauritania	0–1	Gambia
	Report	A. Jallow 10'

Limbe Stadium, Limbe
Referee: Mustapha Ghorbal (Algeria)

16 January 2022
17:00

Tunisia	4–0	Mauritania
Mathlouthi 4'; Khazri 9', 64'; Jaziri 66'	Report

Limbe Stadium, Limbe
Referee: Mahmoud El Banna (Egypt)

20 January 2022
20:00

Mali	2–0	Mauritania
Haïdara 2'; Koné 49' (pen.)	Report

Japoma Stadium, Douala
Referee: Bernard Camille (Seychelles)

=== 2023 Africa Cup of Nations ===
==== Group stage ====
Pos	Team	Pld	W	D	L	GF	GA	GD	Pts	Qualification
1	Angola	3	2	1	0	6	3	+3	7	Advance to knockout stage
2	Burkina Faso	3	1	1	1	3	4	−1	4	Advance to knockout stage
3	Mauritania	3	1	0	2	3	4	−1	3	Advance to knockout stage
4	Algeria	3	0	2	1	3	4	−1	2	

Source: CAF
16 January 2024
14:00

Burkina Faso	1–0	Mauritania
Traoré 90+6' (pen.)	Report

Stade de la Paix, Bouaké
Attendance: 27,898
Referee: Jalal Jiyed (Morocco)

20 January 2024
17:00

Mauritania	2–3	Angola
Amar 43'; Koita 58'	Report	Dala 30', 50'; Gilberto 53'

Stade de la Paix, Bouaké
Attendance: 36,318
Referee: Mohamed Maarouf (Egypt)

23 January 2024
20:00

Mauritania	1–0	Algeria
Yali 37'	Report

Stade de la Paix, Bouaké
Attendance: 28,010
Referee: Omar Artan (Somalia)

==== Round of 16 ====
29 January 2024
17:00

Cape Verde	1–0	Mauritania
Mendes 88' (pen.)	Report

Felix Houphouet Boigny Stadium, Abidjan
Attendance: 16,088
Referee: Mohamed Adel (Egypt)

== Goalscorers ==
Player	2019	2021	2023
Moctar Sidi El Hacen	1		
Sidi Bouna Amar			1
Aboubakary Koita			1
Mohamed Dellahi Yali	–	–	1
Total	1	0	3

== Kits ==
2019 Africa Cup of Nations: Home / Away	2021 Africa Cup of Nations: Home / Away	2023 Africa Cup of Nations: Home / Away
