= Mauritania national football team results (2020–present) =

This article provides details of international football games played by the Mauritania national football team from 2020 to present.

== Results ==
Key
Win
Draw
Defeat

=== 2020 ===
9 October 2020 Friendly	Mauritania	2–1	Sierra Leone	Nouakchott, Mauritania
		Report		Stadium: Stade Cheikha Ould Boïdiya

11 November 2020 2021 AFCONQ	Mauritania	1–1	Burundi	Nouakchott, Mauritania
16:00 UTC+0	N'Diaye 30'	Report	Ntibazonkiza 79'	Stadium: Stade Cheikha Ould Boïdiya; Referee: Alhadi Allaou Mahamat (Chad)

15 November 2020 2021 AFCONQ	Burundi	3–1	Mauritania	Bujumbura, Burundi
15:00 UTC+2	Ntibazonkiza 6', 55'; Ndayishimiye 46'	Report	Niass 27'	Stadium: Prince Louis Rwagasore Stadium; Referee: David Molise (Lesotho)

=== 2021 ===
26 March 2021 2021 AFCONQ	Mauritania	0–0	Morocco	Nouakchott, Mauritania
19:00 UTC+1		Report		Stadium: Stade Cheikha Ould Boïdiya; Referee: Joshua Bondo (Botswana)

30 March 2021 2021 AFCONQ	Central African Republic	0–1	Mauritania	Bangui, Central African Republic
20:00 UTC+1		Report	Kamara 45+4'	Stadium: Barthélemy Boganda Stadium; Referee: Alhadi Allaou Mahamat (Chad)

3 June 2021 Friendly	Algeria	4–1	Mauritania	Blida, Algeria
20:45 UTC+1	Feghouli 40', 57'; Ounas 60'; Bounedjah 70'	Report	Yacoub 57'	Stadium: Mustapha Tchaker Stadium; Referee: Ibrahim Nour El Din (Egypt)

11 June 2021 Friendly	Mauritania	1–0	Liberia	Tunis, Tunisia
16:30 UTC+1	N'Diaye 64'	Report		Stadium: Stade Chedly Zouiten; Referee: Naim Hosni (Tunisia)

22 June 2021 2021 FIFA Arab Cup	Mauritania	2–0	Yemen	Doha, Qatar
20:00 UTC+3	Diakhité 18'; Tanjy 85'	Report		Stadium: Jassim bin Hamad Stadium; Referee: Maurizio Mariani (Italy)

3 September 2021 2022 World Cup qualification	Mauritania	1–2	Zambia	Nouakchott, Mauritania
16:00 UTC+0	Niass 69'	Report	Mwepu 10'; Mumba 57'	Stadium: Stade Olympique de Nouakchott; Referee: Ibrahim Nour El Din (Egypt)

7 September 2021 2022 World Cup qualification	Equatorial Guinea	1–0	Mauritania	Malabo, Equatorial Guinea
17:00 UTC+1	Iban 59' (pen.)	Report		Stadium: Estadio de Malabo; Referee: Helder Martins de Carvalho (Angola)

7 October 2021 2022 World Cup qualification	Tunisia	3–0	Mauritania	Radès, Tunisia
20:00 UTC+1	Skhiri 15'; Khazri 42'; Jaziri 86'	Report		Stadium: Stade Hammadi Agrebi; Referee: Bamlak Tessema Weyesa (Ethiopia)

10 October 2021 2022 World Cup qualification	Mauritania	0–0	Tunisia	Nouakchott, Mauritania
19:00 UTC+0		Report		Stadium: Stade Olympique de Nouakchott; Referee: Mehdi Abid Charef (Algeria)

13 November 2021 2022 World Cup qualification	Zambia	4–0	Mauritania	Lusaka, Zambia
15:00 UTC+2	Daka 34'; F. Sakala 37', 45+1' (pen.), 63'	Report		Stadium: National Heroes Stadium; Referee: Mahmood Ali Mahmood Ismail (Sudan)

16 November 2021 2022 World Cup qualification	Mauritania	1–1	Equatorial Guinea	Nouakchott, Mauritania
19:00 UTC+0	Kamara 22'	Report	Coco 59'	Stadium: Stade Olympique de Nouakchott; Referee: Ahmad Imtehaz Heeralall (Mauritius)

30 November 2021 2021 FIFA Arab Cup	Tunisia	5–1	Mauritania	Al Rayyan, Qatar
16:00 UTC+3	Jaziri 39', 45+2'; Ben Larbi 42', 51'; Msakni 90+1'	Report	Bessam 45+12' (pen.)	Stadium: Ahmed bin Ali Stadium; Referee: Alireza Faghani (Iran)

3 December 2021 2021 FIFA Arab Cup	Mauritania	0–1	United Arab Emirates	Doha, Qatar
19:00 UTC+3		Report	Ibrahim 90+3'	Stadium: Stadium 974; Referee: Andrés Matonte (Uruguay)

6 December 2021 2021 FIFA Arab Cup	Syria	1–2	Mauritania	Al Wakrah, Qatar
18:00 UTC+3	Al Baher 52'	Report	Soueid 50'; Tanjy 90+4'	Stadium: Al Janoub Stadium; Referee: Wilton Sampaio (Brazil)

30 December 2021 Friendly	Mauritania	0–0	Burkina Faso	Abu Dhabi, United Arab Emirates
17:00 UTC+4		Report		Stadium: Sultan bin Zayed Al Nahyan Stadium; Referee: Yahya Ali Al Mulla (United Arab Emirates)

=== 2022 ===
4 January 2022 Friendly	Mauritania	1–1	Gabon	Dubai, United Arab Emirates
17:00 UTC+4		Report		Stadium: Maktoum bin Rashid Al Maktoum Stadium; Referee: Omar Mohamed Al Ali (United Arab Emirates)

12 January 2022 2021 AFCON	Mauritania	0–1	Gambia	Limbe, Cameroon
17:45 UTC+1 (Note: The Mauritania v Gambia game was originally scheduled to begin at 17:00 but was delayed to 17:45 due to timing issues in the Tunisia v Mali match.)		Report	A. Jallow 10'	Stadium: Limbe Stadium; Referee: Mustapha Ghorbal (Algeria)

16 January 2022 2021 AFCON	Tunisia	4–0	Mauritania	Limbe, Cameroon
17:00 UTC+1	Mathlouthi 4'; Khazri 8', 65'; Jaziri 66'	Report		Stadium: Limbe Stadium; Referee: Mahmoud El Banna (Egypt)

20 January 2022 2021 AFCON	Mali	2–0	Mauritania	Douala, Cameroon
20:00 UTC+1	M. Haïdara 2'; Koné 49' (pen.)	Report		Stadium: Japoma Stadium; Referee: Bernard Camille (Seychelles)

26 March 2022 Friendly	Mauritania	2–1	Mozambique	Nouakchott, Mauritania
20:00	Soueid 18'; Ba 90+2'	Report	Alexandre 90'	Stadium: Stade Cheikha Ould Boïdiya; Referee: Mehrez Melki (Tunisia)

29 March 2022 Friendly	Mauritania	2–0	Libya	Nouakchott, Mauritania
21:00	Kamara 39' (pen.); Tanjy 59' (pen.)	Report		Stadium: Stade Cheikha Ould Boïdiya; Referee: Mehrez Melki (Tunisia)

4 June 2022 2023 AFCON Q	Mauritania	3–0	Sudan	Nouakchott, Mauritania
19:00 UTC+0	Kamara 27' (pen.), 30'; Mahmoud 77'	Report		Stadium: Stade Cheikha Ould Boïdiya; Referee: Fabricio Duarte (Cape Verde)

8 June 2022 2023 AFCON Q	Gabon	0–0	Mauritania	Franceville, Gabon
17:00 UTC+1		Report		Stadium: Stade de Franceville; Referee: Messie Nkounkou (Congo)

29 August 2022 2022 CHAN qualification	Guinea-Bissau	0–1	Mauritania	Guinea-Bissau
			Mouhsine 24' (pen.)

2 September 2022 2022 CHAN qualification	Mauritania	1–0	Guinea-Bissau	Mauritania
	XXX 33' (o.g.)

24 September 2022 Friendly	Mauritania	1–0	Benin	Mohammédia, Morocco
22:30 UTC+1	Kamara 27'	Report		Stadium: Stade El Bachir; Referee: Mustapha Kechaf (Morocco)

27 September 2022 Friendly	Mauritania	2–0	Congo	Mohammédia, Morocco
22:00 UTC+1	Thiam 46'; Kamara 47'	Report		Stadium: Stade El Bachir; Referee: Karim Sabry (Morocco)

=== 2023 ===
24 March 2023 AFCON qualification	DR Congo	3–1	Mauritania	Lubumbashi, DR Congo
15:00 UTC+2	Kakuta 37'; Bakambu 42'; Masuaku 67'	Report	Abeid 55'	Stadium: Stade TP Mazembe; Referee: Abongile Tom (South Africa)

28 March 2023 AFCON qualification	Mauritania	0–3 (awarded)	DR Congo	Nouakchott, Mauritania
22:00 UTC+0	Soueid 57'	Report	Bakambu 9'	Stadium: Stade Cheikha Ould Boïdiya; Referee: Sadok Selmi (Tunisia)

20 June 2023 AFCON qualification	Sudan	0–3	Mauritania	Agadir, Morocco
19:00 UTC+1		Report	El Abd 26'; Houbeib 49'; Tanjy 55'	Stadium: Adrar Stadium; Referee: Ibrahim Mutaz (Libya)

9 September 2023 AFCON qualification	Mauritania	2–1	Gabon	Nouakchott, Mauritania
16:00 UTC+0	Tanjy 30'; Kamara 42'	Report	Ndong 90+1'	Stadium: Stade Cheikha Ould Boïdiya; Referee: Mustapha Ghorbal (Algeria)

15 November 2026 World Cup qualification	DR Congo	2–0	Mauritania	Kinshasa, DR Congo
17:00 UTC+1	Wissa 62'; Bongonda 81'	Report		Stadium: Stade des Martyrs; Referee: Elmabrouk Muhammad (Libya)

21 November 2026 World Cup qualification	South Sudan	0–0	Mauritania	Diamniadio, Senegal
16:00 UTC+0		Report		Stadium: Diamniadio Olympic Stadium; Referee: Patrice Milazare (Mauritius)

=== 2024 ===
6 January Friendly	Tunisia	0–0	Mauritania	Tunis, Tunisia
19:30 UTC+1		Report		Stadium: Stade Hammadi Agrebi; Referee: Abdulrazg Ahmed (Libya)

16 January 2023 AFCON GS	Burkina Faso	1–0	Mauritania	Bouaké, Ivory Coast
15:00 UTC+1	Traoré 90+6' (pen.)	Report		Stadium: Stade de la Paix; Referee: Jalal Jayed

20 January 2023 AFCON GS	Mauritania	2–3	Angola	Bouaké, Ivory Coast
18:00 UTC+1	Bouna 43'; Koita 58'	Report	Dala 30', 50'; Gilberto 53'	Stadium: Stade de la Paix; Referee: Mohamed Maarouf Eid Mansour

23 January 2023 AFCON GS	Mauritania	1–0	Algeria	Bouaké, Ivory Coast
21:00 UTC+1	Yali 37'	Report		Stadium: Stade de la Paix; Referee: Omar Abdulkadir Artan

29 January 2023 AFC Asian Cup round of 16	Cape Verde	1–0	Mauritania	Abidjan, Ivory Coast
18:00 UTC+1	Mendes 88' (pen.)	Report		Stadium: Stade Felix Houphouet-Boigny; Referee: Mohamed Adel

22 March Friendly	Mauritania	0–2	Mali	Marrakesh, Morocco
19:00 UTC+0		Report		Stadium: Marrakesh Stadium

26 March Friendly	Morocco	0–0	Mauritania	Agadir, Morocco
19:00 UTC+0		Report		Stadium: Adrar Stadium; Referee: Mohamed Moussa (Niger)

6 June 2026 World Cup qualification	Mauritania	0–2	Sudan	Nouakchott, Mauritania
16:00 UTC+0		Report	Teiri 15'; Abeid 29' (o.g.)	Stadium: Stade Cheikha Ould Boïdiya; Referee: Daniel Nii Laryea (Ghana)

9 June 2026 World Cup qualification	Mauritania	0–1	Senegal	Nouakchott, Mauritania
16:00 UTC+0		Report	Diallo 27'	Stadium: Stade Cheikha Ould Boïdiya; Referee: Samir Guezzaz (Morocco)

7 September 2025 AFCON qualification	Mauritania	1–0	Botswana	Nouakchott, Mauritania
16:00 UTC+0	Amar 84'	Report		Stadium: Cheikha Ould Boïdiya Stadium; Referee: Daniel Nii Laryea (Ghana)

10 September 2025 AFCON qualification	Cape Verde	2–0	Mauritania	Praia, Cape Verde
18:00 UTC−1	Mendes 28' (pen.), 75'	Report		Stadium: Estádio Nacional de Cabo Verde; Referee: Mutaz Ibrahim (Libya)

11 October 2025 AFCON qualification	Egypt	2–0	Mauritania	Cairo, Egypt
19:00 UTC+0	Trézéguet 69'; Salah 79'	Report		Stadium: Cairo International Stadium; Referee: Alhadi Allaou (Chad)

15 October 2025 AFCON qualification	Mauritania	0–1	Egypt	Nouakchott, Mauritania
19:00 UTC+0		Report	Adel 85'	Stadium: Cheikha Ould Boïdiya Stadium; Referee: Imtehaz Heeralall (Mauritius)

15 November 2025 AFCON qualification	Botswana	1–1	Mauritania	Francistown, Botswana
14:00 UTC+2	Baruti 18'	Report	Koïta 7'	Stadium: Obed Itani Chilume Stadium; Referee: Bamlak Tessema Weyesa (Ethiopia)

19 November 2025 AFCON qualification	Mauritania	1–0	Cape Verde	Nouakchott, Mauritania
15:00 UTC+0	Soueid 45+4'	Report		Stadium: Cheikha Ould Boïdiya Stadium; Referee: Lahlou Benbraham (Algeria)

=== 2025 ===
22 March 2026 World Cup qualification	Togo	2–2	Mauritania	Lomé, Togo
16:00 UTC+0	Klidjé 4'; Denkey 69'	Report	Koïta 52'; Mahmoud 55'	Stadium: Stade de Kégué; Referee: Amin Omar (Egypt)

25 March 2026 World Cup qualification	Mauritania	0–2	DR Congo	Nouadhibou, Mauritania
21:00 UTC+0		Report (FIFA); Report (CAF)		Stadium: Nouadhibou Municipal Stadium; Referee: Mohamed Athoumani (Comoros)

6 June Friendly	Central African Republic	2–1	Mauritania	Casablanca, Morocco
		Report		Stadium: Larbi Zaouli Stadium

10 June Friendly	Burundi	0–0	Mauritania	Casablanca, Morocco
		Report		Stadium: Larbi Zaouli Stadium

5 September 2026 World Cup qualification	Mauritania	2–0	Togo	Nouadhibou, Mauritania
19:00 UTC+1	Yade 14'; Abeid 69'	Report		Stadium: Nouadhibou Municipal Stadium; Referee: Lucky Kasalirwe (Uganda)

9 September 2026 World Cup qualification	Mauritania	0–0	South Sudan	Nouadhibou, Mauritania
19:00 UTC+0		Report		Stadium: Nouadhibou Municipal Stadium; Referee: Mehrez Malki (Tunisia)

10 October 2026 World Cup qualification	Sudan	0–0	Mauritania	Miburani, Tanzania
16:00 UTC+3		Report		Stadium: Benjamin Mkapa Stadium; Referee: Jean Ouattara (Burkina Faso)

14 October 2026 World Cup qualification	Senegal	4–0	Mauritania	Diamniadio, Senegal
19:00 UTC+0	Mané 45+1', 48'; Ndiaye 64'; Diallo 85'	Report		Stadium: Diamniadio Olympic Stadium; Referee: Mohamed Ali Moussa (Niger)

12 November Friendly	Tunisia	1–1	Mauritania	Tunis, Tunisia
17:45 UTC+1	Chaouat 38'	Report	M. Sarr 50'	Stadium: Hammadi Agrebi Stadium; Referee: Mohamed Rafiq Aouina (Algeria)

15 November Friendly	Libya	1–0	Mauritania	Benina, Libya
16:00 UTC+2	Mahmoud Al-Shalwi 31'	Report		Stadium: Benina Martyrs Stadium

25 November 2025 FIFA Arab Cup qualification	Mauritania	0–2	Kuwait	Al-Rayyan, Qatar
16:00 UTC+3		Report	Daham 8', 24'	Stadium: Jassim Bin Hamad Stadium; Referee: Ma Ning (China)

=== 2026 ===
27 March Friendly	Argentina	2–1	Mauritania	Buenos Aires, Argentina
19:15 UTC−5	Fernández 17'; Paz 32'	Report	Lefort 90+4'	Stadium: La Bombonera; Attendance: 45760; Referee: Derlis López (Paraguay)

5 June Friendly	Angola	1–1	Mauritania	Casablanca, Morocco
20:00	Keliano 85'	Report	Thiam 90+1'	Stadium: Larbi Zaouli Stadium; Referee: Hicham Temsamani (Morocco)

8 June Friendly	Mauritania	1–0	Niger	Casablanca, Morocco
20:00 UTC+1	I. Thiam 90+6'	Report		Stadium: Père Jégo Stadium; Referee: Mustapha Kechchaf (Morocco)
