= Algeria national football team results (2020–present) =

This article provides details of international football games played by the Algeria national football team from 2020 to present.

== Results ==
Key
Win
Draw
Defeat

=== 2020 ===
9 October 2020 Friendly	Nigeria	0–1	Algeria	Sankt Veit an der Glan, Austria
20:30 UTC+2		Report	Bensebaini 6'	Stadium: Jacques Lemans Arena; Referee: Manuel Schüttengruber (Austria)

13 October 2020 Friendly	Mexico	2–2	Algeria	The Hague, Netherlands
21:00 UTC+2	Corona 43'; D. Lainez 86'	Report	Bennacer 45'; Mahrez 67'	Stadium: Cars Jeans Stadion; Referee: Bas Nijhuis (Netherlands)

12 November 2020 2021 AFCON qualification	Algeria	3–1	Zimbabwe	Algiers, Algeria
20:00 UTC+1	Bounedjah 31'; Feghouli 43'; Mahrez 67'	Report	Kadewere 79'	Stadium: Stade du 5 Juillet; Referee: Sidi Alioum (Cameroon)

16 November 2020 2021 AFCON qualification	Zimbabwe	2–2	Algeria	Harare, Zimbabwe
15:00 UTC+2	Musona 43'; Dube 82'	Report	Delort 34'; Mahrez 38'	Stadium: National Sports Stadium; Referee: Mahmood Ali Mahmood (Sudan)

=== 2021 ===
25 March 2021 2021 AFCON qualification	Zambia	3–3	Algeria	Lusaka, Zambia
21:00 UTC+2	Daka 34' (pen.), 80' (pen.); C. Chama 52'	Report	Ghezzal 19'; Slimani 25', 55'	Stadium: National Heroes Stadium; Referee: Ali Mohamed Adelaid (Comoros)

29 March 2021 2021 AFCON qualification	Algeria	5–0	Botswana	Blida, Algeria
20:00 UTC+1	Mandi 24'; Feghouli 58'; Mahrez 64' (pen.); Bounedjah 72'; Boulaya 88'	Report		Stadium: Mustapha Tchaker Stadium; Referee: Jean Ouattara (Burkina Faso)

3 June 2021 Friendly	Algeria	4–1	Mauritania	Blida, Algeria
20:45 UTC+1	Feghouli 40', 57'; Ounas 60'; Bounedjah 70'	Report	Yacoub 55'	Stadium: Mustapha Tchaker Stadium; Referee: Ibrahim Nour El Din (Egypt)

6 June 2021 Friendly	Algeria	1–0	Mali	Blida, Algeria
20:45 UTC+1	Mahrez 56'	Report		Stadium: Mustapha Tchaker Stadium; Referee: Ahmed El Ghandour (Egypt)

11 June 2021 Friendly	Tunisia	0–2	Algeria	Radès, Tunisia
20:30 UTC+1		Report	Bounedjah 19'; Mahrez 28'	Stadium: Stade Olympique de Radès; Referee: Mohamed Maarouf Eid Mansour (Egypt)

2 September 2021 2022 FIFA WC qualification	Algeria	8–0	Djibouti	Blida, Algeria
20:00 UTC+1	Slimani 5', 25' (pen.), 46', 53'; Bensebaini 27'; Bounedjah 40' (pen.); Mahrez 67'; Zerrouki 69'	Report		Stadium: Mustapha Tchaker Stadium; Attendance: 0 Referee: Blaise Yuven Ngwa (Cameroon)

7 September 2021 2022 FIFA WC qualification	Burkina Faso	1–1	Algeria	Marrakesh, Morocco
20:00 UTC+1	Tapsoba 64'	Report	Feghouli 18'	Stadium: Stade de Marrakech; Attendance: 0 Referee: Joshua Bondo (Botswana)

8 October 2021 2022 FIFA WC qualification	Algeria	6–1	Niger	Blida, Algeria
20:00 UTC+1	Mahrez 27', 60' (pen.); Oumarou 47' (o.g.); Souleymane 70' (o.g.); Slimani 76', 88'	Report	Sosah 50'	Stadium: Mustapha Tchaker Stadium; Attendance: 0 Referee: Daniel Nii Laryea (Ghana)

12 October 2021 2022 FIFA WC qualification	Niger	0–4	Algeria	Niamey, Niger
17:00 UTC+1		Report	Mahrez 21'; Mandi 33'; Bennacer 48'; Bounedjah 54'	Stadium: Stade Général Seyni Kountché; Attendance: 2,000; Referee: Issa Sy (Senegal)

12 November 2021 2022 FIFA WC qualification	Djibouti	0–4	Algeria	Cairo, Egypt
16:00 UTC+2		Report	Belaïli 29'; Benrahma 40'; Feghouli 42'; Slimani 87'	Stadium: Cairo International Stadium; Attendance: 0 Referee: Djindo Louis Houngnandande (Benin)

16 November 2021 2022 FIFA WC qualification	Algeria	2–2	Burkina Faso	Blida, Algeria
20:00 UTC+1	Mahrez 21'; Feghouli 68'	Report	Sanogo 37'; Dayo 84' (pen.)	Stadium: Mustapha Tchaker Stadium; Attendance: 17,000; Referee: Victor Gomes (South Africa)

1 December 2021 2021 FIFA Arab Cup	Algeria	4–0	Sudan	Al Rayyan, Qatar
13:00 UTC+3	Bounedjah 11', 37'; Benlamri 43'; Soudani 46'	Report		Stadium: Ahmed bin Ali Stadium; Attendance: 2,203; Referee: Ryuji Sato (Japan)

4 December 2021 2021 FIFA Arab Cup	Lebanon	0–2	Algeria	Al Wakrah, Qatar
16:00 UTC+3		Report	Brahimi 69' (pen.); Meziani 90+3'	Stadium: Al Janoub Stadium; Attendance: 9,405; Referee: Szymon Marciniak (Poland)

7 December 2021 2021 FIFA Arab Cup	Algeria	1–1	Egypt	Al Wakrah, Qatar
22:00 UTC+3	Tougai 19'	Report	El Solia 60' (pen.)	Stadium: Al Janoub Stadium; Attendance: 32,418; Referee: Facundo Tello (Argentina)

11 December 2021 2021 FIFA Arab Cup QF	Morocco	2–2 (a.e.t.) (3–5 p)	Algeria	Doha, Qatar
22:00 UTC+3	Nahiri 64'; Benoun 111'	Report	Brahimi 62' (pen.); Belaïli 102'	Stadium: Al Thumama Stadium; Attendance: 24,823; Referee: Wilton Sampaio (Brazil)
	Penalties
	Rahimi (penalty scored); Benoun (penalty scored); Jabrane (penalty scored); El Berkaoui (penalty missed)		(penalty scored) Belaïli; (penalty scored) Bendebka; (penalty scored) Bedrane; (penalty scored) Benayada; (penalty scored) Tougai

15 December 2021 2021 FIFA Arab Cup SF	Qatar	1–2	Algeria	Doha, Qatar
22:00 UTC+3	Muntari 90+7'	Report	Benayada 59'; Belaïli 90+17'	Stadium: Al Thumama Stadium; Attendance: 42,405; Referee: Szymon Marciniak (Poland)

18 December 2021 2021 FIFA Arab Cup Final	Tunisia	0–2 (a.e.t.)	Algeria	Al Khor, Qatar
18:00 UTC+3		Report	Sayoud 99'; Brahimi 120+5'	Stadium: Al Bayt Stadium; Attendance: 60,456; Referee: Daniel Siebert (Germany)

=== 2022 ===
5 January 2022 Friendly	Algeria	3–0	Ghana	Al Rayyan, Qatar
19:00 UTC+3	Ounas 8'; J. Mensah 74' (o.g.); Slimani 79'	Report		Stadium: Education City Stadium; Referee: Saoud Ali Al-Adba (Qatar)

11 January 2022 2021 AFCON GS	Algeria	0–0	Sierra Leone	Douala, Cameroon
14:00 UTC+1		Report		Stadium: Japoma Stadium; Referee: Ahmad Imetehaz Heeralall (Mauritius)

16 January 2022 2021 AFCON GS	Algeria	0–1	Equatorial Guinea	Douala, Cameroon
20:00 UTC+1		Report	Esteban 70'	Stadium: Japoma Stadium; Referee: Mario Escobar (Guatemala)

20 January 2022 2021 AFCON GS	Ivory Coast	3–1	Algeria	Douala, Cameroon
17:00 UTC+1	Kessié 22'; I. Sangaré 39'; Pépé 54'	Report	Bendebka 73'	Stadium: Japoma Stadium; Referee: Victor Gomes (South Africa)

25 March 2022 2022 FIFA WC qualification	Cameroon	0–1	Algeria	Douala, Cameroon
18:00 UTC+1		Report	Slimani 40'	Stadium: Japoma Stadium; Referee: Joshua Bondo (Botswana)

29 March 2022 2022 FIFA WC qualification	Algeria	1–2 (a.e.t.) (2–2 (a) agg.)	Cameroon	Blida, Algeria
20:30 UTC+1	Touba 118'	Report	Choupo-Moting 22'; Toko Ekambi 120+4'	Stadium: Mustapha Tchaker Stadium; Referee: Bakary Gassama (Gambia)

4 June 2022 2023 AFCON qualification	Algeria	2–0	Uganda	Algiers, Algeria
20:00 UTC+1	Mandi 28'; Belaïli 80'	Report		Stadium: Stade du 5 Juillet; Referee: Mohamed Hussein (Egypt)

8 June 2022 2023 AFCON qualification	Tanzania	0–2	Algeria	Dar es Salaam, Tanzania
19:00 UTC+3		Report	Bensebaini 45+2'; Amoura 89'	Stadium: National Stadium; Referee: Mahmood Ismail (Sudan)

12 June 2022 Friendly	Iran	1–2	Algeria	Doha, Qatar
19:00 UTC+3	Jahanbakhsh 64'	Report	Benayad 44'; Amoura 83'	Stadium: Suheim bin Hamad Stadium; Referee: Mohammed Ahmed Al-Shammari (Qatar)

23 September 2022 Friendly	Algeria	1–0	Guinea	Oran, Algeria
20:00 UTC+1	Slimani 79'	Report		Stadium: Oran Olympic Stadium - Miloud Hadefi; Attendance: 40,000; Referee: Dahane Beida (Mauritania)

27 September 2022 Friendly	Algeria	2–1	Nigeria	Oran, Algeria
20:00 UTC+1	Mahrez 42' (pen.); Atal 61'	Report	Moffi 9'	Stadium: Oran Olympic Stadium - Miloud Hadefi; Referee: Mehrez Melki (Tunisia)

16 November 2022 Friendly	Algeria	1–1	Mali	Oran, Algeria
20:30 UTC+1	Mahrez 45+3' (pen.)	Report	M. Haïdara 58'	Stadium: Oran Olympic Stadium - Miloud Hadefi; Attendance: 16,530; Referee: Amir Loussif (Tunisia)

19 November 2022 Friendly	Sweden	2–0	Algeria	Malmö, Sweden
19:30 UTC+2	Forsberg 45+3' (pen.); Claesson 47'	Report		Stadium: Eleda Stadion; Referee: Espen Eskås (Norway)

17 December 2022 Friendly	Algeria	2–2	Senegal	Annaba, Algeria
18:30 CET (UTC+1)	Kendouci 27'; Mahious 61'	Report	Kanté 15'; Mbaye 47'	Stadium: 19 May 1956 Stadium

=== 2023 ===
23 March 2023 AFCON qualification	Algeria	2–1	Niger	Algiers, Algeria
22:00 UTC+1	Alhassane 54' (o.g.); Mahrez 88'	Report	Sosah 38'	Stadium: Nelson Mandela Stadium; Referee: Mahmood Ismail (Sudan)

27 March 2023 AFCON qualification	Niger	0–1	Algeria	Tunis, Tunisia
17:00 UTC+1		Report	Bounedjah 6'	Stadium: Hammadi Agrebi Stadium; Referee: Boubou Traoré (Mali)

18 June 2023 AFCON qualification	Uganda	1–2	Algeria	Douala, Cameroon
16:00 UTC+1	Bayo 88'	Report	Amoura 42', 66'	Stadium: Japoma Stadium; Referee: Pierre Atcho (Gabon)

20 June Friendly	Algeria	1–1	Tunisia	Annaba, Algeria
20:30 UTC+1	Mahrez 38' (pen.)	Report	Talbi 13'	Stadium: 19 May 1956 Stadium; Attendance: 55,000; Referee: Abdel Aziz Bouh (Mauritania)

7 September 2023 AFCON qualification	Algeria	0–0	Tanzania	Annaba, Algeria
20:00 UTC+1		Report		Stadium: 19 May 1956 Stadium

12 September Friendly	Senegal	0–1	Algeria	Dakar, Senegal
19:00 UTC+0		Report	Chaïbi 64'	Stadium: Diamniadio Olympic Stadium; Referee: Dahane Beida (Mauritania)

12 October Friendly	Algeria	5–1	Cape Verde	Constantine, Algeria
20:00 UTC+1	Amoura 12'; Aouar 39', 41'; Zerrouki 61'; Slimani 89' (pen.)	Report	Bebé 55'	Stadium: Chahid Hamlaoui Stadium; Referee: Mehrez Melki (Tunisia)

16 October Friendly	Egypt	1–1	Algeria	Al Ain, United Arab Emirates
	H. Fathi 62'	Report	Slimani 90+3'	Stadium: Hazza bin Zayed Stadium; Referee: Yahya Ali Al Mulla (United Arab Emirates)

16 November 2026 FIFA WC qualification	Algeria	3–1	Somalia	Algiers, Algeria
17:00 UTC+1	Abdi 2' (o.g.); Bounedjah 31'; Slimani 80'	Report	Ahmed 65'	Stadium: Nelson Mandela Stadium; Attendance: 40,784; Referee: Boubou Traore (Mali)

19 November 2026 FIFA WC qualification	Mozambique	0–2	Algeria	Maputo, Mozambique
15:00 UTC+2		Report	Chaïbi 69'; Zerrouki 80'	Stadium: Estadio do Zimpeto, Maputo; Referee: Samuel Uwikunda (Rwanda)

=== 2024 ===
5 January Friendly	Togo	0–3	Algeria	Lomé, Togo
21:00 UTC+0		Report (FAF)	Bensebaini 22', 70'; Slimani 55'	Stadium: Stade de Kégué; Attendance: 5,000; Referee: Raphiou Ligali (Benin)

9 January Friendly	Burundi	0–4	Algeria	Lomé, Togo
15:00 UTC+0			Bounedjah 1'; Mahrez 39'; Slimani 87'; Amoura 90+3'	Stadium: Stade de Kégué; Attendance: 0 Referee: Aklesso Gnama (Togo)

15 January 2023 Africa Cup of Nations GS	Algeria	1–1	Angola	Bouaké, Ivory Coast
20:00 UTC+0	Bounedjah 18'	Report	Mabululu 68' (pen.)	Stadium: Stade de la Paix; Attendance: 19,740; Referee: Issa Sy (Senegal)

20 January 2023 Africa Cup of Nations GS	Algeria	2–2	Burkina Faso	Bouaké, Ivory Coast
14:00 UTC+0	Bounedjah 51', 90+5'	Report	Konaté 45+3'; Traoré 71' (pen.)	Stadium: Stade de la Paix; Attendance: 33,501; Referee: Abongile Tom (South Africa)

23 January 2023 Africa Cup of Nations GS	Mauritania	1–0	Algeria	Bouaké, Ivory Coast
20:00 UTC+0	Yali 37'	Report		Stadium: Stade de la Paix; Attendance: 28,010; Referee: Omar Artan (Somalia)

22 March 2024 FIFA World Series	Algeria	3–2	Bolivia	Algiers, Algeria
22:00 UTC+1	A. Gouiri 43'; Y. Benzia 79'; A. Mandi 90+3'	Report	Algarañaz 47'; Sagredo 70'	Stadium: Nelson Mandela Stadium; Referee: Dahane Beida (Mauritania)

26 March 2024 FIFA World Series	Algeria	3–3	South Africa	Algiers, Algeria
22:00 UTC+1	Benzia 22', 70'; Brahimi 53'	Report	Zwane 34', 45+5'; Rayners 66'	Stadium: Nelson Mandela Stadium; Referee: Amir Loussaif (Tunisia)

6 June 2026 FIFA WC qualification	Algeria	1–2	Guinea	Algiers, Algeria
20:00 UTC+1	Baldé 52' (o.g.)	Report	M. Sylla 50'; A. Camara 63'	Stadium: Nelson Mandela Stadium; Attendance: 32,000; Referee: Bamlak Tessema Weyesa (Ethiopia)

10 June 2026 FIFA WC qualification	Uganda	1–2	Algeria	Kampala, Uganda
19:00 UTC+3	Mutyaba 10'	Report	Aouar 46'; Benrahma 58'	Stadium: Mandela National Stadium; Referee: Adissa Abdul Raphiou Ligali (Benin)

5 September 2025 AFCON qualification	Algeria	2–0	Equatorial Guinea	Oran, Algeria
20:00 UTC+1	Aouar 69'; Gouiri 90+5'			Stadium: Miloud Hadefi Stadium; Attendance: 34,850; Referee: Djindo Louis Houngnandande (Benin)

10 September 2025 AFCON qualification	Liberia	0–3	Algeria	Monrovia
--:-- UTC+1			Gouiri 17'; Zorgane 25'; Bounedjah 80'	Stadium: Samuel Kanyon Doe Sports Complex, Monrovia; Attendance: 21,754; Referee: Mahmood Ali Mahmood Ismail (Sudan)

10 October 2025 AFCON qualification	Algeria	5–1	Togo	Annaba, Algeria
--:-- UTC+1	Benrahma 29', 55' (pen.); Aouar 68'; Gouiri 86'; Amoura 90+5'	Report	Klidjé 11'	Stadium: 19 May 1956 Stadium; Attendance: 60,000; Referee: Boubou Traoré (Mali)

15 October 2025 AFCON qualification	Togo	0–1	Algeria	Lomé, Togo
--:-- UTC+1		Report	Bensebaini 18' (pen.)	Stadium: Stade de Kégué; Referee: Jean-Jacques Ndala (Congo DR)

14 November 2025 AFCON qualification	Equatorial Guinea	0–0	Algeria	Malabo, Equatorial Guinea
13:00 UTC+1		Report		Stadium: Estadio de Malabo; Referee: Kalilou Ibrahim Traoré (Ivory Coast)

17 November 2025 AFCON qualification	Algeria	5–1	Liberia	Tizi Ouzou, Algeria
16:00 UTC+1	Mandi 20'; Mahrez 29'; Bounedjah 64'; Gouiri 74'; Amoura 90+5'	Report	Dweh 6'	Stadium: Hocine Aït Ahmed Stadium; Referee: Tanguy Mebiame (Gabon)

=== 2025 ===
21 March 2026 FIFA WC qualification	Botswana	1–3	Algeria	Francistown, Botswana
15:00 UTC+2	Kopelang 70'	Report (FIFA); Report (CAF)	Gouiri 44'; Amoura 52', 74'	Stadium: Obed Itani Chilume Stadium; Referee: Ahmed Arajiga (Tanzania)

25 March 2026 FIFA WC qualification	Algeria	5–1	Mozambique	Tizi Ouzou, Algeria
22:00 UTC+1	Amoura 8', 30', 80'; Mandi 24'; Hadjam 65'	Report (FIFA); Report (CAF)	Geny Catamo 40'	Stadium: Hocine Aït Ahmed Stadium; Referee: Pacifique Ndabihawenimana (Burundi)

5 June Friendly	Algeria	2–0	Rwanda	Constantine, Algeria
17:00 UTC+1	Belaïli 28'; Hadjam 58'			Stadium: Chahid Hamlaoui Stadium; Referee: Mahmood Ali Ismail (Sudan)

10 June Friendly	Sweden	4–3	Algeria	Solna, Sweden
19:00 UTC+2	Sema 14', 39', 50' (pen.); Salétros 56'	Report	Bennacer 64'; Benzia 71'; Bentaleb 86' (pen.)	Stadium: Nationalarenan; Attendance: 15,148; Referee: Rob Harvey (Ireland)

4 September 2026 FIFA WC qualification	Algeria	3–1	Botswana	Tizi Ouzou, Algeria
20:00 UTC+1	Amoura 33'; Bounedjah 71', 90+6'	Report (FIFA); Report (CAF)	Kopelang 43'	Stadium: Hocine Aït Ahmed Stadium; Referee: Pacifique Ndabihawenimana (Burundi)

8 September 2026 FIFA WC qualification	Guinea	0–0	Algeria	Casablanca, Morocco
17:00 UTC+1				Stadium: Mohammed V Stadium; Referee: Samuel Uwikunda (Rwanda)

9 October 2026 FIFA WC qualification	Somalia	0–3	Algeria	Oran, Algeria (Note: Somalia chose to play at the Miloud Hadefi Stadium in Oran, Algeria due to the non-qualification of its stadium.)
17:00 UTC+1			Amoura 7', 57'; Mahrez 19'	Stadium: Miloud Hadefi Stadium; Attendance: 40,000; Referee: Godfrey Nkhakananga (Malawi)

14 October 2026 FIFA WC qualification	Algeria	2–1	Uganda	Tizi Ouzou, Algeria
17:00 UTC+1	Amoura 81' (pen.), 90+9' (pen.)		Mukwala 6'	Stadium: Hocine Aït Ahmed Stadium; Attendance: 40,000; Referee: Ahmad Imtehaz Heeralall (Mauritius)

13 November Friendly	Algeria	3–1	Zimbabwe	Jeddah, Saudi Arabia
19:30 UTC+3	Bounedjah 14'; Amoura 41'; Hadjam 45+1'	Report	Chirewa 88' (pen.)	Stadium: Prince Abdullah Al-Faisal Sports City Stadium; Referee: Abdullah Dhafer Al Shehri (Saudi Arabia)

18 November Friendly	Saudi Arabia	0–2	Algeria	Jeddah, Saudi Arabia
19:30 UTC+3			Mahrez 75' (pen.); Belghali 85'	Stadium: Prince Abdullah Al-Faisal Sports City Stadium; Referee: Abdulhadi Al-Ruwaili (Qatar)

3 December 2025 FIFA Arab Cup	Algeria	0–0	Sudan	Al Rayyan, Qatar
15:00 UTC+3				Stadium: Ahmad bin Ali Stadium

6 December 2025 FIFA Arab Cup	Bahrain	1–5	Algeria	Doha, Qatar
16:30 UTC+3				Stadium: Khalifa International Stadium

9 December 2025 FIFA Arab Cup	Algeria	2–0	Iraq	Doha, Qatar
20:00 UTC+3				Stadium: Khalifa International Stadium

24 December 2025 AFCON GS	Algeria	3–0	Sudan	Rabat, Morocco
13:00 UTC+1				Stadium: Moulay Hassan Stadium

28 December 2025 AFCON GS	Algeria	1–0	Burkina Faso	Rabat, Morocco
13:00 UTC+1				Stadium: Moulay Hassan Stadium

31 December 2025 AFCON GS	Equatorial Guinea	1–3	Algeria	Rabat, Morocco
18:00 UTC+1				Stadium: Moulay Hassan Stadium

=== 2026 ===
6 January 2025 Africa Cup of Nations - Round of 16	Algeria	1–0 (a.e.t.)	DR Congo	Rabat, Morocco
17:00 UTC+1	Boulbina 119'	Report		Stadium: Moulay Hassan Stadium; Attendance: 18,837; Referee: Mohamed Maarouf (Egypt)

10 January 2025 Africa Cup of Nations - Quarter-finals	Algeria	0–2	Nigeria	Marrakesh, Morocco
17:00 UTC+1		Report	Osimhen 47'; Adams 57'	Stadium: Marrakesh Stadium; Attendance: 32,452; Referee: Issa Sy (Senegal)

27 March Friendly	Algeria	7–0	Guatemala	Genoa, Italy
20:45 UTC+2	Gouiri 19', 60'; Mahrez 31' (pen.); Abada 45+1'; Aouar 47'; Ghedjemis 76'; Benbouali 82'	Source		Stadium: Stadio Luigi Ferraris

31 March Friendly	Algeria	0–0	Uruguay	Turin, Italy
20:45 UTC+2		Source		Stadium: Juventus Stadium

3 June Friendly	Netherlands	0–1	Algeria	Rotterdam, Netherlands
20:45		Report	Hadj Moussa 86'	Stadium: De Kuip; Attendance: 40,306; Referee: Jakob Semler (Austria)

11 June Friendly	Algeria	4–0	Bolivia	Lawrence, Kansas, United States
19:00 UTC−5	Mandi 45'; Gouiri 56', 58'; Hadj Moussa 61'	Report		Stadium: Rock Chalk Park; Attendance: ~150; Referee: Tori Penso (United States)

16 June 2026 FIFA World Cup Group J	Argentina	3–0	Algeria	Kansas City, Missouri, United States
20:00 UTC−5	Messi 17', 60', 76'	Report		Stadium: Arrowhead Stadium; Attendance: 69,045; Referee: Szymon Marciniak (Poland)

22 June 2026 FIFA World Cup Group J	Jordan	1–2	Algeria	Santa Clara, California, United States
20:00 UTC−7	Al-Rashdan 36'	Report	Benbouali 69'; Gouiri 82'	Stadium: Levi's Stadium; Attendance: 68,371; Referee: Slavko Vinčić (Slovenia)

27 June 2026 FIFA World Cup Group J	Algeria	3–3	Austria	Kansas City, Missouri, United States
21:00 UTC−5	Belghali 45'; Mahrez 60', 90+3'	Report	Arnautovic 28'; Sabitzer 55'; Kalajdzic 90+6'	Stadium: Arrowhead Stadium; Attendance: 69,045; Referee: Ilgiz Tantashev (Uzbekistan)

2 July 2026 FIFA World Cup Round of 32	Switzerland	2–0	Algeria	Vancouver, British Columbia, Canada
20:00 UTC−7	Embolo 10'; Ndoye 46'	Report		Stadium: BC Place; Attendance: 52,497; Referee: Yael Falcón (Argentina)

TBD 2027 AFCON qualification	Algeria	v	Zambia	TBD, Algeria
TBD				Stadium: TBD

TBD 2027 AFCON qualification	Zambia	v	Algeria	TBD, Zambia
TBD				Stadium: TBD

TBD 2027 AFCON qualification	Algeria	v	Togo	TBD, Algeria
TBD				Stadium: TBD

TBD 2027 AFCON qualification	Togo	v	Algeria	TBD, Togo
TBD				Stadium: TBD

TBD 2027 AFCON qualification	Algeria	v	Burundi	TBD, Algeria
TBD				Stadium: TBD

TBD 2027 AFCON qualification	Burundi	v	Algeria	TBD, Burundi
TBD				Stadium: TBD

== Head to head records (2020-present) ==
As of 16 June 2026

Head to head records
Opponent	P	W	D	L	GF	GA	W%	D%	L%
Angola	1	0	1	0	1	1	0	100	0
Argentina	1	0	0	1	0	3	0	0	100
Bolivia	2	2	0	0	7	2	100	0	0
Botswana	3	3	0	0	11	2	100	0	0
Burkina Faso	3	0	3	0	5	5	0	100	0
Burundi	1	1	0	0	4	0	100	0	0
Cameroon	2	1	0	1	2	2	50	0	50
Djibouti	2	2	0	0	12	0	100	0	0
Egypt	1	0	1	0	1	1	0	100	0
Equatorial Guinea	3	1	1	1	2	1	33.33	33.33	33.33
Gambia	2	1	1	0	3	0	50	50	0
Ghana	1	1	0	0	3	0	100	0	0
Guinea	4	1	2	1	3	3	25	50	25
Iran	1	1	0	0	2	1	100	0	0
Ivory Coast	1	0	0	1	1	3	0	0	100
Lebanon	1	1	0	0	2	0	100	0	0
Liberia	2	2	0	0	8	1	100	0	0
Mali	2	1	1	0	2	1	50	50	0
Mauritania	2	1	0	1	4	2	50	0	50
Mexico	1	0	1	0	2	2	0	100	0
Morocco	1	0	1	0	2	2	0	100	0
Mozambique	2	2	0	0	7	1	100	0	0
Netherlands	1	1	0	0	1	0	100	0	0
Niger	3	2	1	0	10	1	66.67	33.33	0
Nigeria	2	2	0	0	3	1	100	0	0
Qatar	1	1	0	0	2	1	100	0	0
Rwanda	1	1	0	0	2	0	100	0	0
Saudi Arabia	1	1	0	0	2	0	100	0	0
Sierra Leone	1	0	1	0	0	0	0	100	0
Somalia	2	2	0	0	6	1	100	0	0
South Africa	2	0	2	0	4	4	0	100	0
Sudan	2	1	1	0	5	1	50	50	0
Sweden	1	0	0	1	3	4	0	0	100
Tanzania	1	1	0	0	2	0	100	0	0
Togo	3	3	0	0	9	1	100	0	0
Tunisia	2	2	0	0	4	0	100	0	0
Uganda	4	4	0	0	9	2	100	0	0
Uruguay	1	0	1	0	1	1	0	100	0
Zambia	1	0	1	0	3	3	0	100	0
Zimbabwe	3	2	1	0	8	4	66.67	33.33	0
Totals	70	44	19	7	157	56	63.77	27.54	10.14
