= 2023 Africa Cup of Nations Group D =

Football tournament group stage

Group D of the 2023 Africa Cup of Nations took place from 15 to 23 January 2024. The group consisted of Algeria, Burkina Faso, Mauritania, and Angola.

Angola and Burkina Faso as the top two teams, along with Mauritania as one of the four best third-placed teams, advanced to the round of 16.

== Teams ==
| Draw position | Team | Zone | Method of qualification | Date of qualification | Finals appearance | Last appearance | Previous best performance | FIFA Rankings | |
| Draw position | Team | Zone | Method of qualification | Date of qualification | Finals appearance | Last appearance | Previous best performance | October 2023 (Note: The rankings of October 2023 were used for seeding for the final draw.) | December 2023 |
|---|---|---|---|---|---|---|---|---|---|
| D1 | Algeria | UNAF | Group F winners | 27 March 2023 | 20th | 2021 | Winners (1990, 2019) | 34 | 30 |
| D2 | Burkina Faso | WAFU | Group B winners | 28 March 2023 | 13th | 2021 | Runners-up (2013) | 57 | 58 |
| D3 | Mauritania | WAFU | Group I runners-up | 9 September 2023 | 3rd | 2021 | Group stage (2019, 2021) | 99 | 105 |
| D4 | Angola | COSAFA | Group E runners-up | 10 September 2023 | 9th | 2019 | Quarter-finals (2008, 2010) | 117 | 117 |

== Standings ==
| Pos | Team | Pld | W | D | L | GF | GA | GD | Pts | Qualification |
|---|---|---|---|---|---|---|---|---|---|---|
| 1 | Angola | 3 | 2 | 1 | 0 | 6 | 3 | +3 | 7 | Advance to knockout stage |
| 2 | Burkina Faso | 3 | 1 | 1 | 1 | 3 | 4 | −1 | 4 | Advance to knockout stage |
| 3 | Mauritania | 3 | 1 | 0 | 2 | 3 | 4 | −1 | 3 | Advance to knockout stage |
| 4 | Algeria | 3 | 0 | 2 | 1 | 3 | 4 | −1 | 2 | |

Source: CAF
Rules for classification: Group stage tiebreakers

== Matches ==
All times are local, GMT (UTC±0).

=== Algeria vs Angola ===
Algeria and Angola met for the tenth time, with the most recent meeting being at the 2010 Africa Cup of Nations, which Angola hosted that year. A goalless draw between the nations in Luanda on 18 January 2010 proved enough to send both nations to the tournament's knockout stage. The nations also met in the second round of qualifying for the 2006 FIFA World Cup. The nations opened their phases on 5 June 2004, with a goalless draw in Annaba, Algeria, and would meet again exactly one year later in Luanda. Goals from Flavio and Akwa helped give Angola its first (and to date) victory against Algeria, and the 2–1 result proved crucial for Angola to qualify for its first World Cup. Algeria and Angola also met in qualifying for the 1986 FIFA World Cup and the 2002 Africa Cup of Nations, for which Algeria qualified for the respective tournaments.

Algeria asserted domination and in the 18th minute, Baghdad Bounedjah produced a scissor volley to give Algeria the lead. However, poor finishing and wasted opportunities saw Algeria bitterly pay the price when a foul from Nabil Bentaleb to Mabululu saw the Angolan talisman convert the spot perfectly to seal the match to a draw.

15 January 2024
20:00

| Algeria | 1–1 | Angola |
|---|---|---|
| Bounedjah 18' | Report | Mabululu 68' (pen.) |

Stade de la Paix, Bouaké
Attendance: 19,740
Referee: Issa Sy (Senegal)

| Algeria | Angola |

| GK | 16 | Anthony Mandrea |
| RB | 20 | Youcef Atal | (yellow card) 79' | (substituted off) 80' |
| CB | 2 | Aïssa Mandi |
| CB | 21 | Ramy Bensebaini | (yellow card) 34' |
| LB | 15 | Rayan Aït-Nouri |
| CM | 22 | Ismaël Bennacer | (yellow card) 52' | (substituted off) 80' |
| CM | 19 | Nabil Bentaleb | (yellow card) 48' | (substituted off) 72' |
| RW | 7 | Riyad Mahrez (c) |
| AM | 17 | Farès Chaïbi |
| LW | 8 | Youcef Belaïli | | (substituted off) 67' |
| CF | 9 | Baghdad Bounedjah | | (substituted off) 67' |
Substitutions:
| FW | 13 | Islam Slimani | | (substituted on) 67' |
| FW | 12 | Adam Ounas | | (substituted on) 67' |
| MF | 6 | Ramiz Zerrouki | | (substituted on) 72' |
| DF | 3 | Kevin Van Den Kerkhof | | (substituted on) 80' |
| MF | 11 | Houssem Aouar | | (substituted on) 80' |
Manager:
Djamel Belmadi

| GK | 22 | Neblú |
| CB | 3 | Jonathan Buatu |
| CB | 6 | Gaspar |
| CB | 5 | Quinito |
| RM | 2 | Núrio Fortuna | (yellow card) 32' |
| CM | 23 | Show |
| CM | 17 | Bruno Paz | | (substituted off) 41' |
| LM | 14 | Loide Augusto | | (substituted off) 78' |
| AM | 16 | Fredy (c) | | (substituted off) 88' |
| CF | 10 | Gelson Dala | | (substituted off) 88' |
| CF | 15 | Zito Luvumbo | | (substituted off) 78' |
Substitutions:
| FW | 19 | Mabululu | | (substituted on) 41' |
| FW | 11 | Felício Milson | | (substituted on) 78' |
| DF | 21 | Eddie Afonso | | (substituted on) 78' |
| FW | 9 | Zini | | (substituted on) 88' |
| MF | 4 | Manuel Keliano | | (substituted on) 88' |
Manager:
(Portugal) Pedro Gonçalves

Man of the Match:
Farès Chaïbi (Algeria)

Assistant referees:
Djibril Camara (Senegal)
Nouha Bangoura (Senegal)
Fourth official:
Samuel Uwikunda (Rwanda)
Video assistant referee:
Pierre Atcho (Gabon)
Assistant video assistant referee:
Carine Atezambong (Cameroon)

=== Burkina Faso vs Mauritania ===
Burkina Faso and Mauritania met for the tenth time, and the first at an Africa Cup of Nations. The nations had also met in qualifying for the 1998 FIFA World Cup, the 2000 Africa Cup of Nations, and the 2019 Africa Cup of Nations. Burkina Faso defeated Mauritania in a first-round qualifying phase for the 1998 World Cup, with the 2–0 victory on 16 June 1996, being Burkina Faso's only victory in that World Cup qualifying campaign. The nations also met in a preliminary round for the 2002 Africa Cup of Nations, with Burkina Faso winning 3–0 on aggregate and jumpstarting its successful qualification for the 2002 Africa Cup of Nations. Mauritania's first victory against Burkina Faso came on 8 September 2018, during qualification for the 2019 Africa Cup of Nations, with a 2–0 result in Nouakchott, Mauritania. When the nations met in the group stage finale on 22 March 2019, Mauritania was assured of its first Africa Cup of Nations. However, Burkina Faso, eliminated from contention, ended the campaign with a 1–0 victory.

The match began with a fiery tempo when Burkina Faso and Mauritania fought for control of the ball. Still, it was the Mauritanians who came closest at scoring when Aboubakary Koita tested Hervé Koffi with a thunderous shot. Mauritania continued to test the Burkinabé but, after ongoing wasted opportunities, Mauritania was forced to pay a brutal price when Issa Kaboré was fouled by Nouh Mohamed El Abd, before Bertrand Traoré clinically converted the penalty to secure Burkina Faso's victory.

16 January 2024
14:00

| Burkina Faso | 1–0 | Mauritania |
|---|---|---|
| Traoré 90+6' (pen.) | Report |

Stade de la Paix, Bouaké
Attendance: 27,898
Referee: Jalal Jiyed (Morocco)

| Burkina Faso | Mauritania |

| GK | 16 | Hervé Koffi |
| RB | 9 | Issa Kaboré |
| CB | 12 | Edmond Tapsoba |
| CB | 14 | Issoufou Dayo (c) |
| LB | 25 | Steeve Yago |
| CM | 22 | Blati Touré | (yellow card) 47' |
| CM | 24 | Adama Guira |
| RW | 17 | Stephane Aziz Ki | | (substituted off) 86' |
| AM | 11 | Mamady Bangré | | (substituted off) 46' |
| LW | 8 | Cedric Badolo | | (substituted off) 73' |
| CF | 13 | Mohamed Konaté | (yellow card) 45' | (substituted off) 86' |
Substitutions:
| FW | 15 | Abdoul Tapsoba | (yellow card) 76' | (substituted on) 46' |
| FW | 10 | Bertrand Traoré | | (substituted on) 73' |
| FW | 2 | Djibril Ouattara | | (substituted on) 85' |
| FW | 19 | Hassane Bandé | | (substituted on) 86' |
Manager:
(France) Hubert Velud

| GK | 16 | Babacar Niasse |
| RB | 4 | Omaré Gassama |
| CB | 13 | Nouh Mohamed El Abd | (yellow card) 90+4' |
| CB | 5 | Lamine Ba | | (substituted off) 67' |
| LB | 20 | Ibrahima Keita |
| RM | 19 | Aboubakary Koita |
| CM | 6 | Guessouma Fofana | | (substituted off) 67' |
| LM | 3 | Aly Abeid (c) | (yellow card) 90+9' |
| AM | 9 | Hemeya Tanjy | | (substituted off) 57' |
| AM | 10 | Idrissa Thiam | | (substituted off) 58' |
| CF | 27 | Aboubakar Kamara | | (substituted off) 28' |
Substitutions:
| FW | 11 | Souleymane Anne | | (substituted on) 28' |
| FW | 23 | Sidi Bouna Amar | | (substituted on) 57' |
| MF | 7 | El Hadji Ba | | (substituted on) 58' |
| MF | 26 | Oumar Ngom | | (substituted on) 67' |
| DF | 14 | Mohamed Dellahi Yali | | (substituted on) 67' |
Manager:
(France) Amir Abdou

Man of the Match:
Blati Touré (Burkina Faso)

Assistant referees:
Zakaria Brinssi (Morocco)
Arsénio Marengula (Mozambique)
Fourth official:
Louis Houngnandande (Benin)
Video assistant referee:
Haythem Guirat (Tunisia)
Assistant video assistant referee:
Diana Chikotesha (Zambia)

=== Algeria vs Burkina Faso ===
Algeria and Burkina Faso met for the 18th time, and the first at the Africa Cup of Nations since 1998 when goals from Kassoum Ouedraogo (via penalty) and Seydou Traore gave Burkina Faso, the tournament hosts, its first-ever victory at the Africa Cup of Nations, a 2-1 victory that helped spearhead the nation's fourth-place finish in 1998. Both nations had also met at the group stage finale of the 1996 African Cup of Nations, with Algeria winning 2–1 in Port Elizabeth, South Africa.

Both also met in qualifying for the 2002 Africa Cup of Nations, with Algeria and Burkina Faso both advancing to the tournament (Burkina Faso defeated Algeria in the teams' final qualifying match to secure the qualification on 17 June 2001). The nations also met in qualifying for both the 2014 and 2022 World Cups, the former for which Algeria qualified for the 2014 World Cup on the away goals rule. The nations also drew twice when they met during the 2022 FIFA World Cup qualification phase, with the latter being a 2–2 draw in Bilda, Algeria, that once again eliminated Burkina Faso from World Cup contention.

The match started at a high tempo with Algerian domination, but Burkina Faso's resilient defense allowed the team to stay afloat. As Algeria was overwhelmingly committing to frontal assaults, their reckless defense resulted in Abdoul Tapsoba seizing the deal with a deep cross before Mohamed Konaté flung it into the net at the third minute of extra time. With the restart of the match, Baghdad Bounedjah took advantage of a tricky free kick by Nabil Bentaleb in the 51st minute. However, an unnecessary foul by Rayan Aït-Nouri on Issa Kaboré resulted in a penalty, which Bertrand Traoré didn't miss it to make it two for Burkina Faso at the 71st minute. However, Burkina Faso squandered their lead at the fifth minute of injury time when Bounedjah won the air combat to head to the net as the match ended in a manic 2–2 draw.

This result meant Burkina Faso had scored in 16 AFCON matches, while Algeria remained winless in five AFCON matches.

20 January 2024
14:00

| Algeria | 2–2 | Burkina Faso |
|---|---|---|
| Bounedjah 51', 90+5' | Report | M. Konaté 45+3'; Traoré 71' (pen.) |

Stade de la Paix, Bouaké
Attendance: 33,501
Referee: Abongile Tom (South Africa)

| Algeria | Burkina-Faso |

| GK | 16 | Anthony Mandrea |
| RB | 20 | Youcef Atal |
| CB | 2 | Aïssa Mandi |
| CB | 21 | Ramy Bensebaini | (yellow card) 53' |
| LB | 15 | Rayan Aït-Nouri |
| CM | 6 | Ramiz Zerrouki |
| CM | 19 | Nabil Bentaleb | | (substituted off) 81' |
| RW | 7 | Riyad Mahrez (c) | | (substituted off) 74' |
| AM | 10 | Sofiane Feghouli | | (substituted off) 45' |
| LW | 8 | Youcef Belaïli | | (substituted off) 74' |
| CF | 9 | Baghdad Bounedjah | (yellow card) 90+6' |
Substitutions:
| FW | 18 | Mohamed Amoura | | (substituted on) 45' |
| FW | 12 | Adam Ounas | | (substituted on) 74' |
| MF | 17 | Farès Chaïbi | | (substituted on) 74' |
| FW | 13 | Islam Slimani | | (substituted on) 81' |
Manager:
Djamel Belmadi

| GK | 16 | Hervé Koffi |
| RB | 9 | Issa Kaboré |
| CB | 12 | Edmond Tapsoba |
| CB | 14 | Issoufou Dayo (c) |
| LB | 25 | Steeve Yago |
| CM | 4 | Adamo Nagalo | (yellow card) 17' | (substituted off) 84' |
| CM | 24 | Adama Guira | | (substituted off) 39' |
| RW | 22 | Blati Touré | (yellow card) 90+8' |
| AM | 15 | Abdoul Tapsoba | | (substituted off) 84' |
| LW | 20 | Gustavo Sangaré | (yellow card) 23' | (substituted off) 84' |
| CF | 13 | Mohamed Konaté | (yellow card) 62' | (substituted off) 64' |
Substitutions:
| MF | 18 | Ismahila Ouédraogo | | (substituted on) 39' |
| FW | 10 | Bertrand Traoré | | (substituted on) 64' |
| MF | 26 | Dramane Salou | | (substituted on) 84' |
| DF | 5 | Nasser Djiga | (yellow card) 90+2' | (substituted on) 84' |
| FW | 8 | Cedric Badolo | | (substituted on) 84' |
Manager:
(France) Hubert Velud

Man of the Match:
Baghdad Bounedjah (Algeria)

Assistant referees:
Souru Phatsoane (Lesotho)
Abelmiro dos Reis (São Tomé and Príncipe)
Fourth official:
Bamlak Tessema Weyesa (Ethiopia)
Video assistant referee:
Pierre Atcho (Gabon)
Assistant video assistant referee:
Carine Atezambong (Cameroon)

=== Mauritania vs Angola ===
Angola and Mauritania met for only the fifth since, and all matches have occurred since 2018. The first meetings took place in October 2018, with both nations meeting during qualification for the 2019 Africa Cup of Nations. On 12 October 2018, Mauritania took a shock lead in only two minutes with a goal from Moctar Sidi El Hacen, but Angola responded with four unanswered goals to win 4–1, with a brace from Mateus. Five days later, Adama Ba's goal was the only scoring when the teams met in Nouakchott, Mauritania. Both nations qualified for the Africa Cup of Nations, with Mauritania doing so for the first time in the nation's history. Both nations would be drawn into Group E of the 2019 Africa Cup of Nations, and the meeting on 29 June 2019, in Suez, Egypt, ended goalless, and ultimately, both nations exited the group stage of that tournament. The most recent meeting took place on 20 January 2023, during the 2022 African Nations Championship, in Oran, Algeria, with the nations playing to another goalless draw (Mauritania advanced out of the group and into the quarterfinals).

The match started with a high tempo, and after surviving a failed Mauritanian onslaught, Angola capitalized with Gelson Dala producing a scissor finish to get Angola ahead in the 30th minute. However, just before the injury time of the first half, Sidi Bouna Amar provided a brilliant solo over Angolan defenders before unleashing his powerful shot to give Mauritania's first-ever goal from an open play in AFCON to end the first half with an exhilarating draw. Within the final 45 minutes, Dala struck the second with a smart shot that saw Babacar Niasse fail to respond in the 50th minute. Gilberto then added to the table just three minutes later after intercepting the ball from Khadim Diaw before making a clinical finish. However, Aboubakary Koita would reduce the deficit five minutes later with a stunning long-range strike, but Angola held firm to win.

This was Angola's first victory at the Africa Cup of Nations since 22 January 2012, against Burkina Faso.

20 January 2024
17:00

| Mauritania | 2–3 | Angola |
|---|---|---|
| Amar 43'; Koita 58' | Report | Dala 30', 50'; Gilberto 53' |

Stade de la Paix, Bouaké
Attendance: 36,318
Referee: Mohamed Maarouf (Egypt)

| Mauritania | Angola |

| GK | 16 | Babacar Niasse |
| CB | 13 | Nouh Mohamed El Abd |
| CB | 5 | Lamine Ba |
| CB | 3 | Aly Abeid (c) | | (substituted off) 46' |
| RWB | 20 | Ibrahima Keita | (yellow card) 24' |
| CM | 4 | Omaré Gassama | (yellow card) 85' |
| CM | 23 | Sidi Bouna Amar | | (substituted off) 81' |
| CM | 6 | Guessouma Fofana | | (substituted off) 59' |
| LWB | 8 | Mouhsine Bodda |
| CF | 19 | Aboubakary Koita |
| CF | 25 | Pape Ibnou Ba | | (substituted off) 59' |
Substitutions:
| DF | 2 | Khadim Diaw | | (substituted on) 46' |
| FW | 27 | Aboubakar Kamara | | (substituted on) 59' |
| FW | 15 | Souleymane Doukara | | (substituted on) 59' |
| FW | 9 | Hemeya Tanjy | | (substituted on) 81' |
Manager:
(France) Amir Abdou

| GK | 22 | Neblú |
| RB | 21 | Eddie Afonso |
| CB | 6 | Gaspar |
| CB | 3 | Jonathan Buatu |
| LB | 2 | Núrio Fortuna | (yellow card) 90+6' |
| DM | 23 | Show |
| RM | 9 | Zini | | (substituted off) 61' |
| CM | 7 | Gilberto | | (substituted off) 78' |
| CM | 16 | Fredy (c) | | (substituted off) 86' |
| LM | 10 | Gelson Dala | | (substituted off) 86' |
| CF | 19 | Mabululu |
Substitutions:
| MF | 4 | Manuel Keliano | | (substituted on) 61' |
| FW | 15 | Zito Luvumbo | | (substituted on) 78' |
| MF | 20 | Estrela | | (substituted on) 86' |
| DF | 5 | Quinito | | (substituted on) 86' |
Manager:
(Portugal) Pedro Gonçalves

Man of the Match:
Gelson Dala (Angola)

Assistant referees:
Attia Amsaaed (Libya)
Khalil Hassani (Tunisia)
Fourth official:
Mutaz Ibrahim (Libya)
Video assistant referee:
Mahmoud El Bana (Egypt)
Assistant video assistant referee:
Mahmoud Abouelregal (Egypt)

=== Angola vs Burkina Faso ===
Angola and Burkina Faso met for the ninth time. In addition to meeting at the 2012 Africa Cup of Nations in Malabo, Equatorial Guinea (which Angola won 2–1), the nations also met in qualification campaigns for the 2002, 2015, and 2019 editions. Both nations split the meetings during qualifying for the 2002 edition (Burkina Faso winning 1–0 in Ouagadougou on 13 January 2001, and Angola winning 2–0 in Luanda on 25 March 2001) and Burkina Faso ultimately qualified for the 2002 Africa Cup of Nations. A similar scenario unfolded for the 2015 qualifiers, with Burkina Faso winning 3–0 on 10 September 2014, and Jonathan Pitriopa scoring two of his six overall goals during the campaign in that match. Burkina Faso secured qualification for the 2015 Africa Cup of Nations before its group stage finale, which ended 1–1 against Angola in Ouagadougou, as Pitriopa scored on a penalty. For the 2019 qualifiers, both nations also split victories, with Burkina Faso winning 3–1 on 10 June 2017 and Angola winning 2–1 on 18 November 2018. Ultimately, Angola advanced, and Burkina Faso did not. In addition, both nations also met during the 2018 African Nations Championship, with the teams playing to a goalless draw in Agadir, Morocco, on 16 January 2018, to open Group D (Angola advanced out of the group).

In the 36th minute, from a free kick, Mabululu drew first blood with a direct header to give Angola the lead they wanted. Despite efforts by the Burkinabés to find the back of the net, they were punished at the second minute of extra time in the second half, when from a chaotic defence in Burkina Faso's side, Jérémie Bela's thunderous shot was deflected by Hervé Koffi before Zini capitalised from the opportunity to seal Angola the win.

It was the first time ever Angola had ever topped the group of an AFCON and returned to knoucknout stage for the first time since 2010.

23 January 2024
20:00

| Angola | 2–0 | Burkina Faso |
|---|---|---|
| Mabululu 36'; Zini 90+2' | Report |

Charles Konan Banny Stadium, Yamoussoukro
Attendance: 15,753
Referee: Jean-Jacques Ndala (DR Congo)

| Angola | Burkina Faso |

| GK | 22 | Neblú | (yellow card) 88' |
| RB | 21 | Eddie Afonso |
| CB | 6 | Gaspar |
| CB | 5 | Quinito |
| LB | 13 | Tó |
| CM | 16 | Fredy (c) | | (substituted off) 77' |
| CM | 17 | Bruno Paz | | (substituted off) 64' |
| CM | 20 | Estrela |
| RF | 7 | Gilbero | | (substituted off) 58' |
| CF | 19 | Mabululu | (yellow card) 36' | (substituted off) 77' |
| LF | 10 | Gelson Dala | | (substituted off) 58' |
Substitutions:
| FW | 18 | Jérémie Bela | | (substituted on) 58' |
| FW | 15 | Zito Luvumbo | | (substituted on) 58' |
| MF | 23 | Show | | (substituted on) 64' |
| FW | 11 | Felício Milson | (yellow card) 79' | (substituted on) 77' |
| FW | 9 | Zini | | (substituted on) 77' |
Manager:
(Portugal) Pedro Gonçalves

| GK | 16 | Hervé Koffi |
| RB | 9 | Issa Kaboré |
| CB | 14 | Issoufou Dayo |
| CB | 12 | Edmond Tapsoba |
| LB | 3 | Abdoul Guiebre | | (substituted off) 76' |
| CM | 20 | Gustavo Sangaré |
| CM | 18 | Ismahila Ouédraogo | (yellow card) 27' | (substituted off) 89' |
| RW | 10 | Bertrand Traoré (c) | | (substituted off) 76' |
| AM | 17 | Stephane Aziz Ki | | (substituted off) 89' |
| LW | 8 | Cedric Badolo | | (substituted off) 45' |
| CF | 7 | Dango Ouattara |
Substitutions:
| FW | 2 | Djibril Ouattara | | (substituted on) 45' |
| FW | 15 | Abdoul Tapsoba | | (substituted on) 76' |
| DF | 25 | Steeve Yago | | (substituted on) 76' |
| MF | 6 | Sacha Bansé | | (substituted on) 89' |
| FW | 19 | Hassane Bandé | | (substituted on) 89' |
Manager:
(France) Hubert Velud

Man of the Match:
Gaspar (Angola)

Assistant referees:
Mostafa Akarkad (Morocco)
Ahmed Hossam (Egypt)
Fourth official:
Louis Houngnandande (Benin)
Video assistant referee:
Samir Guezzaz (Morocco)
Assistant video assistant referee:
Haythem Guirat (Tunisia)

=== Mauritania vs Algeria ===
Algeria and Mauritania met for only the seventh time, with the first meeting coming during a two-leg first-round meeting in qualifying for the 1986 Africa Cup of Nations, which Algeria won 5–1 on aggregate as they eventually qualified for the tournament. The nations also met in friendlies in 2017 and 2021, with the former being a 3–1 Algeria victory in what was the nation's final match before the 2017 Africa Cup of Nations.

After Algerian attempts to find the back of the net early on failed to materialize, Mauritania surprised Algeria in the 37th minute when from a corner kick, Omaré Gassama's blocked shot came to Mohamed Dellahi Yali, whose shot proved too difficult for Anthony Mandrea to deny as it hit the post before delivered home. Despite rampant Algerian pressure later on, Mauritania held firm to create history.

This result meant Algeria failed to win in six Africa Cup of Nations matches. In contrast, Mauritania made history by winning a match at the Africa Cup of Nations and advancing past the group stage, both for the first time.

23 January 2024
20:00

| Mauritania | 1–0 | Algeria |
|---|---|---|
| Yali 37' | Report |

Stade de la Paix, Bouaké
Attendance: 28,010
Referee: Omar Artan (Somalia)

| Mauritania | Algeria |

| GK | 16 | Babacar Niasse |
| RB | 4 | Omaré Gassama |
| CB | 20 | Ibrahima Keita |
| CB | 5 | Lamine Ba | (yellow card) 45+4' |
| LB | 2 | Khadim Diaw |
| DM | 14 | Mohamed Dellahi Yali (c) | | (substituted off) 68' |
| RM | 23 | Sidi Bouna Amar | | (substituted off) 81' |
| LM | 19 | Aboubakary Koita | (yellow card) 53' | (substituted off) 82' |
| AM | 8 | Mouhsine Bodda | (yellow card) 21' |
| CF | 10 | Idrissa Thiam | | (substituted off) 82' |
| CF | 11 | Souleymane Anne | | (substituted off) 71' |
Substitutions:
| DF | 21 | Hassan Houbeib | | (substituted on) 68' |
| MF | 6 | Guessouma Fofana | | (substituted on) 71' |
| MF | 12 | Bakari Camara | | (substituted on) 81' |
| FW | 27 | Aboubakar Kamara | | (substituted on) 82' |
| FW | 25 | Pape Ibnou Ba | | (substituted on) 82' |
Manager:
(France) Amir Abdou

| GK | 16 | Anthony Mandrea |
| RB | 20 | Youcef Atal | | (substituted off) 81' |
| CB | 2 | Aïssa Mandi (c) |
| CB | 4 | Mohamed Amine Tougai |
| LB | 15 | Rayan Aït-Nouri |
| RM | 6 | Ramiz Zerrouki |
| CM | 14 | Hicham Boudaoui | | (substituted off) 62' |
| CM | 11 | Houssem Aouar | | (substituted off) 45' |
| LM | 12 | Adam Ounas | | (substituted off) 62' |
| CF | 9 | Baghdad Bounedjah |
| CF | 18 | Mohamed Amoura | (yellow card) 45+4' | (substituted off) 69' |
Substitutions:
| FW | 7 | Riyad Mahrez | | (substituted on) 45' |
| FW | 8 | Youcef Belaïli | (yellow card) 83' | (substituted on) 62' |
| MF | 19 | Nabil Bentaleb | | (substituted on) 62' |
| FW | 13 | Islam Slimani | (yellow card) 76' | (substituted on) 69' |
| DF | 3 | Kevin Van Den Kerkhof | | (substituted on) 81' |
Manager:
Djamel Belmadi

Man of the Match:
Babacar Niasse (Mauritania)

Assistant referees:
Elvis Noupué (Cameroon)
Boris Ditsoga (Gabon)
Fourth official:
Ahmed Heerallal (Mauritius)
Video assistant referee:
Daniel Nii Laryea (Ghana)
Assistant video assistant referee:
Akhona Makalima (South Africa)

== Discipline ==
Fair play points would have been used as tiebreakers if the overall and head-to-head records of teams were tied. These were calculated based on yellow and red cards received in all group matches as follows:

Only one of the above deductions was applied to a player in a single match.

| Team | Match 1 | | | | Match 2 | | | | Match 3 | | | | Points |
| Team | Booked | (yellow card) (yellow-red card) | Sent off (straight red) | (yellow card) (red card) | Booked | (yellow card) (yellow-red card) | Sent off (straight red) | (yellow card) (red card) | Booked | (yellow card) (yellow-red card) | Sent off (straight red) | (yellow card) (red card) | Points |
|---|---|---|---|---|---|---|---|---|---|---|---|---|---|
| Algeria | 4 | | | | 2 | | | | 3 | | | | –9 |
| Burkina Faso | 3 | | | | 5 | | | | 1 | | | | –9 |
| Mauritania | 2 | | | | 2 | | | | 3 | | | | –7 |
| Angola | 1 | | | | 1 | | | | 3 | | | | –5 |
