= Bakari Camara =

Mauritanian footballer (born 1994)

Personal information
- Date of birth: 4 January 1994 (age 32)
- Place of birth: Aulnay-sous-Bois, France
- Height: 1.89 m (6 ft 2 in)
- Position: Defensive midfielder

Team information
- Current team: Rouen
- Number: 13

Senior career*
| Years | Team | Apps | (Gls) |
| 2015–2016 | Montagnarde | | |
| 2016–2020 | Drancy | 88 | (4) |
| 2020–2021 | Versailles | 4 | (0) |
| 2021–2022 | Bobigny | 22 | (0) |
| 2022–2023 | Paris 13 Atletico | 18 | (0) |
| 2023–2024 | Villefranche | 20 | (2) |
| 2024–2026 | Nancy | 29 | (1) |
| 2026– | Rouen | 0 | (0) |

International career^{‡}
| 2023– | Mauritania | 13 | (0) |
- * Club domestic league appearances and goals as of 12 May 2026 ‡ National team caps and goals as of 20:55, 5 September 2025 (UTC)

Bakari Camara (born 4 January 1994) is a professional footballer who plays as a defensive midfielder for Ligue 3 club Rouen. Born in France, he plays for the Mauritania national team.

== Club career ==
Camara was a semi-professional footballer and unemployed to start his senior career, and was instead studying his BAFA – an animation certificate, before spending a season with Montagnarde in the Division d'Honneur. His strong performances earned him a move to Drancy, where he stayed 4 seasons. He followed that up with seasons at Versailles and Bobigny. He moved to the Championnat National side Paris 13 Atletico in the summer of 2022.

On 5 September 2023, Camara moved to Villefranche.

== International career ==
Born in France, Camara holds Mauritanian nationality. He first expressed an interest in playing for the Mauritania national team in April 2017. He was called up to Mauritania for a set of 2023 Africa Cup of Nations qualification matches against the DR Congo in March 2023.

== Honours ==
Nancy

- Championnat National: 2024–25
