= Omaré Gassama =

French footballer (born 1995)

Omare Gassama
Personal information
- Date of birth: 1 September 1995 (age 31)
- Place of birth: Tarbes, France
- Height: 1.80 m (5 ft 11 in)
- Position: Defensive midfielder

Youth career
- Tours
- 2012–2014: Thouars

Senior career*
Years	Team	Apps	(Gls)
2014–2015	Thouars	13	(0)
2015–2016	Le Mans	12	(0)
2016–2017	Victor San Marino	13	(2)
2017–2018	Francavilla	22	(1)
2018–2019	Meyrin	10	(0)
2019–2021	Tours	21	(4)
2021–2022	Poissy	28	(6)
2022–2023	Sedan	18	(0)
2023–2024	Châteauroux	10	(0)
2023–2024	Châteauroux II	5	(0)

International career^{‡}
2023–	Mauritania	1	(0)
- * Club domestic league appearances and goals as of 16 June 2024 ‡ National team caps and goals as of 19:50, 5 September 2023 (UTC)

Omare Gassama (born 1 September 1995) is a professional footballer who plays as a defensive midfielder. Born in France, he plays for the Mauritania national team.

== Career ==
A youth product of Thouars, Gassama began his senior career with them in 2014 in the Championnat National 3, before moving to Le Mans the following season. He followed that up with a stint in the Italian Serie D with Victor San Marino and Francavilla from 2016 to 2018, before moving to Switzerland with Meyrin. He returned to his childhood club Tours in the summer of 2021. After 2 seasons with them, he moved to Poissy on 6 July 2021. On 24 September 2022, he had a stint with Sedan in the Championnat National. On 15 July 2023, he transferred to Châteauroux.

== Personal life ==
Born in France, Gassama is of Mauritanian descent. He debuted for the Mauritania national team in a 3–0 win over Sudan on 20 June 2023.
