= Khadim Diaw =

Footballer (born 1998)

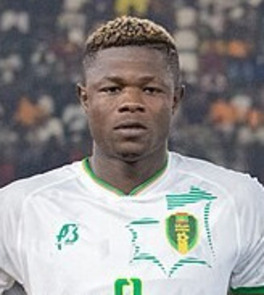

Personal information
- Date of birth: 7 July 1998 (age 28)
- Place of birth: Saint-Louis, Senegal
- Height: 1.84 m (6 ft 0 in)
- Position: Left-back

Team information
- Current team: Olympique Akbou
- Number: 2

Youth career
- Horizon 2000

Senior career*
Years	Team	Apps	(Gls)
2014–2021	Génération Foot		
2020–2021	→Horoya (loan)		
2021–2023	Horoya		
2023–2026	Al-Hilal SC		
2026	Al-Nasr SC	11	(0)
2026-	Olympique Akbou	1	(0)

International career^{‡}
2019	Senegal	4	(0)
2022–	Mauritania	25	(0)
- * Club domestic league appearances and goals as of 3 September 2026 ‡ National team caps and goals as of 25 March 2025

Khadim Diaw (born 7 July 1998) is a professional footballer who plays as a left-back for Algerian Ligue Professionnelle 1 club Olympique Akbou. Born in Senegal, he plays for the Mauritania national team.

== Club career ==
Diaw is a youth product of Génération Foot, and spent his early career with them helping them win 2 Senegal Premier Leagues and 1 Senegal FA Cup. On 2 November 2020, he joined the Guinean club Horoya on loan. After his debut season, he was nominated for an individual league award, and he formally signed for Horoya on a 3-year contract.

On 26 July 2023, Diaw signed for Sudanese club Al-Hilal SC on a four-year contract.

On 11 July 2026, he joined Algerian club Olympique Akbou.

== International career ==
Born in Senegal, Diaw is of Guinean descent through his mother, and Mauritanian descent through a grandmother. He was part of the Senegal U23s that won the 2019 WAFU Cup of Nations. He was called up to Mauritania for a set of 2023 Africa Cup of Nations qualification matches against the DR Congo in March 2023. On 11 July, CAF awarded the match to DR Congo, as Diaw failed to follow the proper procedure for switching national teams after previously representing Senegal during 2020 African Nations Championship qualification, deeming him ineligible to represent Mauritania.

== Honours ==
Génération Foot

- Senegal Premier League: 2016–17, 2018–19
- Senegal FA Cup: 2018

Horoya

- Guinée Championnat National: 2020–21, 2021–22

Senegal Local

- WAFU Cup of Nations: 2019
