= Mohamed Dellah Yaly =

Mauritanian professional footballer

Personal information
- Full name: Mohamed Dellah Yaly
- Date of birth: 1 November 1997 (age 29)
- Place of birth: Nouakchott, Mauritania
- Height: 1.75 m (5 ft 9 in)
- Position: Midfielder

Team information
- Current team: Olympic
- Number: 4

Youth career
- Garde Nationale

Senior career*
Years	Team	Apps	(Gls)
2014–2016	Tevragh-Zeina		
2016–2017	Nouadhibou		
2017	Liepāja	3	(0)
2018	Tidjikja		
2018–2019	Tevragh-Zeina		
2019	DRB Tadjenanet	12	(1)
2019	NA Hussein Dey	3	(0)
2020	Tevragh-Zeina		
2020–2022	Al-Nasr		
2022–2023	Nouadhibou		
2023–2024	Al-Hudood	8	(0)
2025	Al-Kahrabaa	24	(0)
2025–	Olympic		

International career^{‡}
2015–	Mauritania	75	(3)
- * Club domestic league appearances and goals ‡ National team caps and goals as of 15 October 2024 (UTC)

Mohamed Dellah Yaly (born 1 November 1997) is a Mauritanian professional footballer who plays as a midfielder for Libyan Premier League club Olympic and the Mauritania national team.

== International career ==
Yali scored his second international goal in qualification for the 2018 African Nations Championship; the first of a 2–0 win over Liberia.

On 23 January 2024, Yali scored the only goal in a 1–0 victory over Algeria during the Africa Cup of Nations, which granted his country their first win in the competition, and first ever qualification to the knockout phase as one of the best third-placed teams.

== Career statistics ==
=== Club ===
As of 26 May 2019.

Club	Season	League			Cup		Continental		Other		Total	
Club	Season	Division	Apps	Goals	Apps	Goals	Apps	Goals	Apps	Goals	Apps	Goals
FK Liepāja	2017	Optibet Virslīga	3	0	1 (Note: Appearance in the Latvian Football Cup)	0	–		–		4	0
DRB Tadjenanet	2018–19	Ligue 1	12	1	–		–		–		12	1
NA Hussein Dey	2019–20	Ligue 1	0	0	0	0	–		–		0	0
Career total			15	1	1	0	–		–		16	1

=== International ===
As of match played 15 October 2024.

National team	Year	Apps	Goals
Mauritania
Mauritania	2015	7	1
Mauritania	2016	7	0
Mauritania	2017	9	1
Mauritania	2018	7	0
Mauritania	2019	8	0
Mauritania	2020	3	0
Mauritania	2021	14	0
Mauritania	2022	10	0
Mauritania	2023	2	0
Mauritania	2024	8	1
Total		75	3

=== International goals ===
Scores and results list Mauritania's goal tally first.

No	Date	Venue	Opponent	Score	Result	Competition
1.	27 June 2015	Stade Olympique, Nouakchott, Mauritania	Sierra Leone	1–0	2–0	2016 African Nations Championship qualification
2.	16 July 2017	Samuel Kanyon Doe Sports Complex, Monrovia, Liberia	Liberia	1–0	2–0	2018 African Nations Championship qualification
3.	23 January 2024	Stade de la Paix, Bouaké, Ivory Coast	Algeria	1–0	1–0	2023 Africa Cup of Nations
