= Bertrand Traoré =

Burkinabé footballer (born 1995)

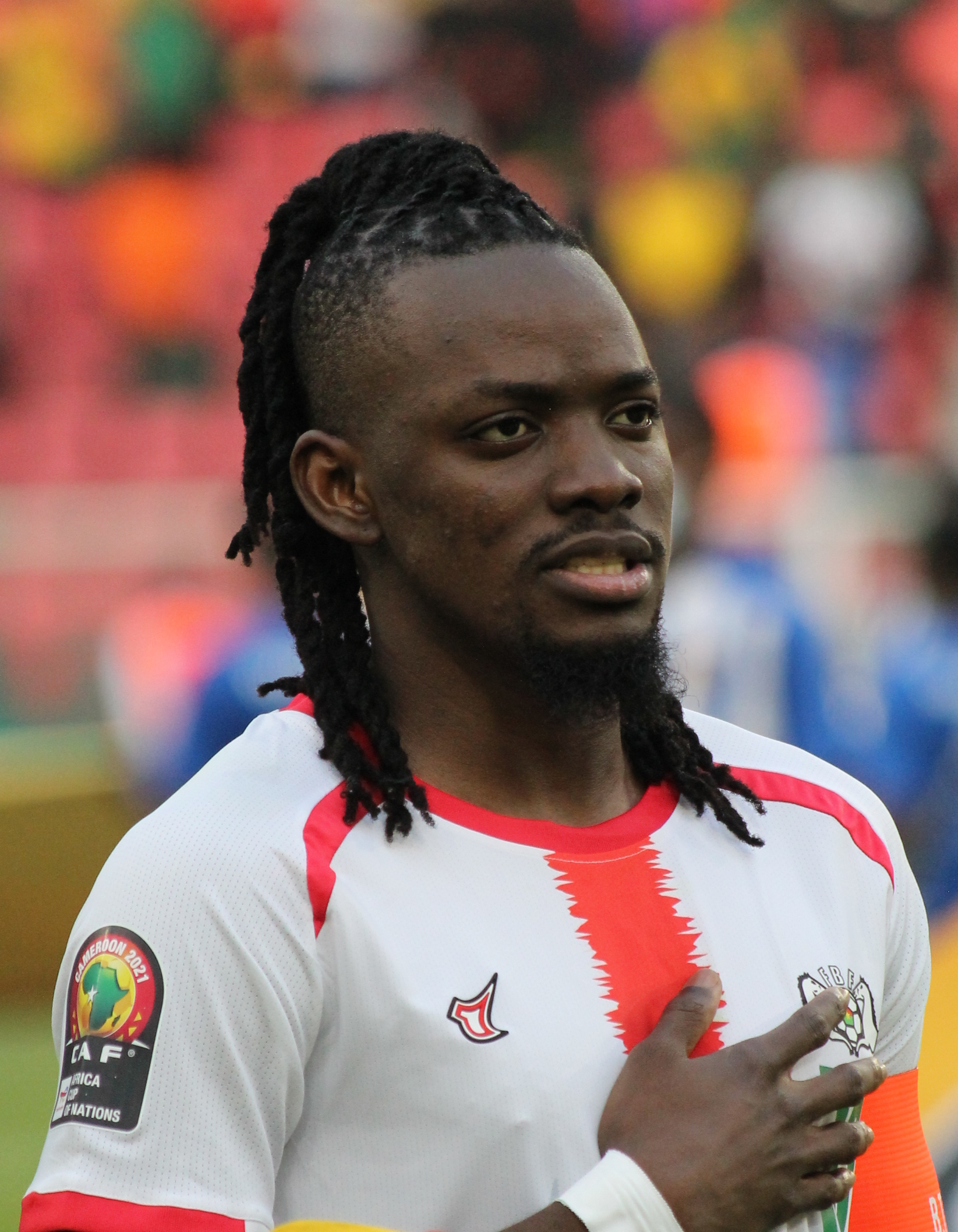
- Traoré with Burkina Faso at the 2021 Africa Cup of Nations

Personal information
- Full name: Bertrand Isidore Traoré
- Date of birth: 6 September 1995 (age 31)
- Place of birth: Bobo-Dioulasso, Burkina Faso
- Height: 1.80 m (5 ft 11 in)
- Positions: Forward; attacking midfielder; winger

Team information
- Current team: Wolverhampton Wanderers
- Number: 11

Youth career
- 2009–2010: Auxerre
- 2013–2014: Chelsea

Senior career*
Years	Team	Apps	(Gls)
2014–2017	Chelsea	10	(2)
2014–2015	→ Vitesse (loan)	42	(16)
2016–2017	→ Ajax (loan)	24	(9)
2017–2020	Lyon	87	(21)
2020–2024	Aston Villa	55	(12)
2022–2023	→ İstanbul Başakşehir (loan)	12	(2)
2024	Villarreal	11	(1)
2024–2025	Ajax	33	(6)
2025–2026	Sunderland	12	(1)
2026–	Wolverhampton Wanderers	0	(0)

International career^{‡}
2009–2011	Burkina Faso U17	8	(4)
2011–	Burkina Faso	91	(22)
Medal record
Men's football
Representing Burkina Faso
African Cup of Nations
Third place	2017 Gabon
- * Club domestic league appearances and goals as of 8 September 2026 ‡ National team caps and goals as of 6 January 2026

Bertrand Isidore Traoré (born 6 September 1995) is a Burkinabé professional footballer who plays as a forward or right winger for EFL Championship club Wolverhampton Wanderers and captains the Burkina Faso national team.

After beginning his career at Auxerre, Traoré finished his development at Chelsea, and made his debut in a one-and-a-half-year loan at Vitesse in the Eredivisie. After a season in the Premier League with Chelsea, he was loaned back to the Netherlands to play for Ajax in 2016, and a year later signed for Lyon for €10 million. He then played for İstanbul Başakşehir on loan until 2023.

A full international from the age of 15, Traoré represented Burkina Faso at six Africa Cup of Nations tournaments.

== Club career ==
=== Chelsea ===
In August 2010, it was reported that Traoré had joined the Chelsea Academy from French club Auxerre, rejecting Manchester United in the process.

In January 2011, however, Traoré had not yet signed for the club, and in January 2012 the club confirmed that Traoré was not and had never been a Chelsea player, but had appeared once for the club's youth team in a friendly as part of a six-week trial earlier in the season. On 17 July 2013, however, he made his debut, as a trialist, in a pre-season friendly against the Singha All Stars.

On 31 October 2013, Traoré officially signed a four-and-a-half-year contract with Chelsea. He signed a contract for Chelsea's senior team in December 2013, and completed the transfer on 1 January 2014.

==== Loan to Vitesse ====
On 2 January 2014, Traoré signed on loan for Eredivisie side Vitesse. On 26 January, he made his debut, coming on in the 67th minute for fellow Chelsea loanee Lucas Piazon. On 29 March 2014, Traoré scored his first goal, against Heerenveen. He replaced Mike Havenaar after half-time; in the 67th minute, he scored Vitesse's second goal of the game which was assisted by fellow Chelsea loanee, Christian Atsu. On 6 April, Traoré scored his second goal of the season in a home match against Ajax which ended in a 1–1 draw. On 12 April, Traoré put Vitesse in the lead for the first time in the match against Cambuur, although Vitesse lost the game 4–3 in the end.

On 7 July 2014, it was confirmed that Traoré would stay at Vitesse on loan for the 2014–15 season. Traoré scored his first goal of the season in a 4–1 victory over Willem II on 18 October. While he primarily played on the right wing during his first loan to Vitesse, around December, Traoré made the switch from the right to being the lone striker up top leading up to him scoring on 14 December in a 1–1 draw against Groningen. In the following games, Traoré scored his first brace in a 4–0 win over Ajax in the KNVB Cup, then three days later scored his first league brace in a 3–0 win over Heracles.

==== 2015–16 season: Promotion to first team ====
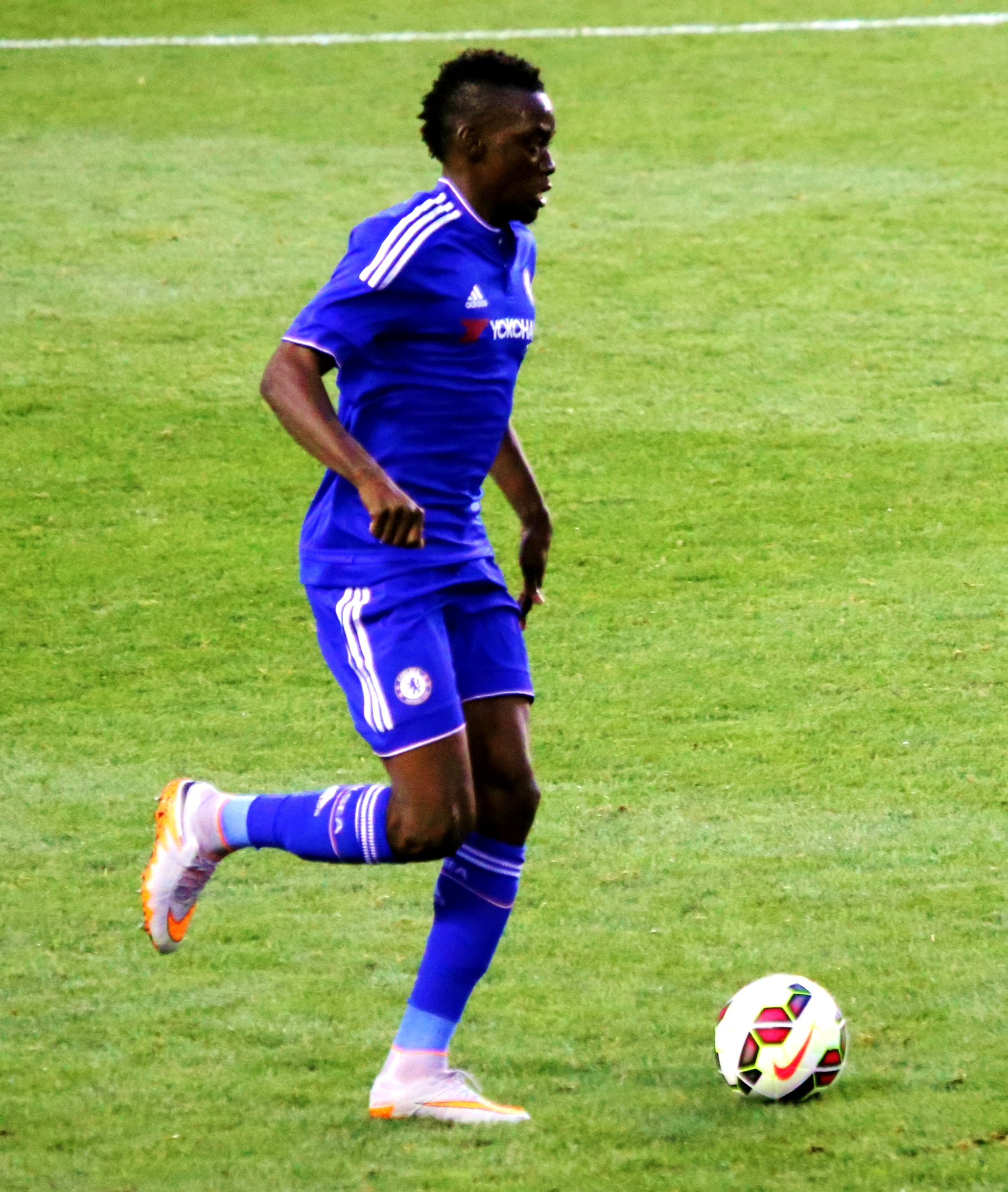
Traoré playing for Chelsea in 2015

On 22 June 2015, Traoré received a work permit and therefore clearance to play for Chelsea for the 2015–16 season onwards. He was given the number 14 shirt, previously worn by André Schürrle. On 16 September, Traoré made his Chelsea debut in a 4–0 victory against Maccabi Tel Aviv in the UEFA Champions League group stage, coming on as a 77th-minute substitute for Ruben Loftus-Cheek. His Premier League debut came on 5 December, playing the final seven minutes of a 0–1 home loss to AFC Bournemouth.

Traoré scored four goals in five matches in early 2016. On 31 January 2016, Traoré scored his first Chelsea goal in a 5–1 victory at Milton Keynes Dons in the FA Cup, confirming the result five minutes after coming on in place of Diego Costa. Two weeks later, after again replacing Costa, he scored his first Premier League goal in a game of the same result against Newcastle United. On 5 March, with Costa rested ahead of a Champions League game, Traoré was given a start in a home Premier League match against Stoke City and scored from 20 yards to open a 1–1 draw, but his performance was described as "mixed" due to "failing to control the ball in the box on a couple of occasions and being caught offside needlessly".

==== Loan to Ajax ====
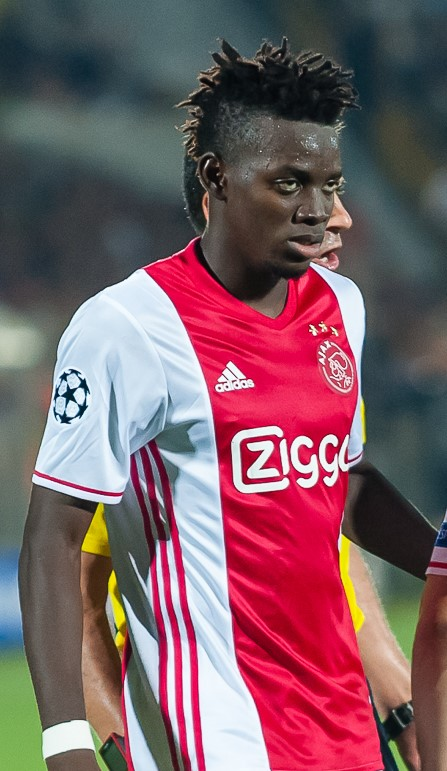
Traore with Ajax in 2016

On 12 August 2016, Traoré signed a new three-year contract with Chelsea and joined Ajax on loan for the 2016–17 campaign, which reunited him with former Vitesse manager, Peter Bosz. On the following day, Traoré made his league debut off the bench, replacing Kasper Dolberg in a 2–2 home draw against Roda JC. On 16 August, Traoré made his first start in a Champions League play-off round against Rostov, a 1–1 draw.

On 15 September, Traoré scored his first Ajax goal in a Europa League group stage tie against Panathinaikos, scoring Ajax's equaliser in a 2–1 win. Just over a week later, he scored his first league goal in a 5–1 win over PEC Zwolle.

On 3 November 2016, Bosz criticised Traoré in an interview stating that there's "nothing wrong with his attitude, but his form is not good".

Traoré scored four goals in the 2016–17 UEFA Europa League, including two goals in a 4–1 victory in the first leg of the semi-final against Lyon. He played every minute of the final, with Ajax losing to Manchester United 2–0.

=== Lyon ===
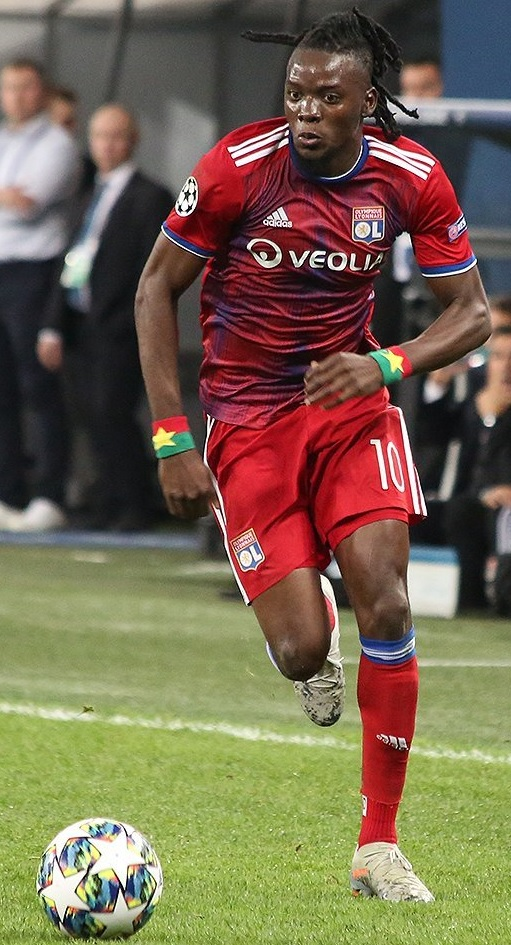
Traoré playing for Lyon in 2019

On 26 June 2017, Traoré signed for Ligue 1 club Lyon on a five-year contract for an initial transfer fee of €10 million (£8.8 million), plus potential add-ons. Chelsea reportedly inserted a buy-back clause into Traoré's contract and would receive 15 per cent of any profit made by Lyon on the fee should they sell Traoré in the future. Chelsea would also have first refusal should Traoré move again.

In his first season in France, Traoré formed an attacking trio with Mariano Díaz and Memphis Depay, all of whom reached double figures in league goals. He was sidelined with knee ligament injury from November 2017 until January, when he returned and scored a free kick for the reserve team in a 3–2 home loss to SC Schiltigheim in the fourth tier.

In the 2020 Coupe de la Ligue Final on 31 July, the last match in the competition, Traoré was the only player to miss in the penalty shootout as Paris Saint-Germain won 6–5 after a goalless draw; his attempt was saved by Keylor Navas.

=== Aston Villa ===
On 19 September 2020, Traoré signed for Premier League side Aston Villa for an undisclosed fee, believed to be £17 million. He scored on his debut five days later, in a 3–0 away victory in the EFL Cup against Bristol City. He went on to make his league debut on 28 September as a second-half substitute in a 3–0 away win over Fulham. On 20 December, he scored his first Premier League goal in four years in a 3–0 away victory over local rivals West Bromwich Albion. On 23 May 2021, the final day of the Premier League season, Traore scored the first goal at Villa Park with fans in attendance since the start of the COVID-19 pandemic in a 2–1 win over former club Chelsea, in which he also won the penalty that Anwar El Ghazi converted for the winner.

On 22 August 2022, Traoré signed for Süper Lig club İstanbul Başakşehir on a season-long loan. He was recalled early from that loan on 31 January 2023. On 4 April 2023, he scored his first goal for Villa in almost two years, coming on as a late substitute and netting the winner in a 2–1 away victory over Leicester City. Four days later, on 8 April 2023, he scored again for Villa, with the opening goal in a 2–0 home win against Nottingham Forest. On 12 January 2024, manager Unai Emery said the player was free to leave the club.

=== Villarreal ===
On 1 February 2024, Traoré joined La Liga side Villarreal on a free transfer, signing a contract until the end of the season.

=== Return to Ajax ===
On 15 July 2024, Traoré rejoined Dutch side Ajax by signing a contract until 2026.

=== Sunderland ===
On 1 September 2025, Traoré joined Premier League side Sunderland for a fee worth £2.5 million; he signed a one-year contract with an option for an additional year.

=== Wolverhampton Wanderers ===
On 7 September 2026, Traoré joined EFL Championship side Wolverhampton Wanderers as a free agent.

== International career ==
Traoré participated at the 2009 FIFA U-17 World Cup and 2011 African U-17 Championship, and helped Burkina Faso beat Rwanda 2–1 in the continental final.

At the age of 15, Traoré made his debut for the Burkina Faso senior national team on 3 September 2011 in a friendly match against Equatorial Guinea. He made his first appearance at an Africa Cup of Nations finals in the 2012 edition, becoming one of the youngest players to do so. He came on as a 66th-minute substitute for Narcisse Yaméogo in the 2–1 loss to Sudan in their final group stage match with Burkina Faso already eliminated from the tournament after losing their first two group stage matches.

Traoré scored his first goal for the senior national team on 14 August 2013, opening the scoring in a 2–1 friendly away win over Morocco. At the 2015 Africa Cup of Nations, he played all three of the team's games in another group stage exit, starting the first two.

Burkina Faso came third at the 2017 Africa Cup of Nations in Morocco. Traoré scored in a 2–0 win over Guinea-Bissau in Marrakesh, sending his country to the quarter-finals.

In 2022, Traoré and the Burkina Faso national team participated in the 2021 Africa Cup of Nations in Cameroon, finishing fourth in the competition after losing in the semi-finals to eventual champions Senegal and in the third-place play-off to hosts Cameroon, both defeats coming on penalties.

On 20 December 2023, Traoré was named among the 27 players selected by Hubert Velud to represent Burkina Faso at the 2023 Africa Cup of Nations.

On 8 December 2025, Traoré was named among the 25 players selected by head coach Brama Traoré to represent Burkina Faso at the 2025 Africa Cup of Nations.

== Personal life ==
Traoré's father, Feu Traoré Isaï, was also a footballer. He played for RC Bobo and also represented Burkina Faso at international level. Bertrand is the youngest of four children. The second-eldest, Alain, is also a footballer. He is the cousin of Shakhtar Donetsk striker Lassina Traoré.

After moving to Chelsea's academy, Traoré was educated at Whitgift School. Traoré is Catholic.

== Career statistics ==
=== Club ===
As of match played 16 September 2026

Appearances and goals by club, season and competition
Club	Season	League			National cup (Note: Includes FA Cup, KNVB Cup, Coupe de France)		League cup (Note: Includes Football League/EFL Cup, Coupe de la Ligue)		Europe		Other		Total	
Club	Season	Division	Apps	Goals	Apps	Goals	Apps	Goals	Apps	Goals	Apps	Goals	Apps	Goals
Chelsea	2015–16	Premier League	10	2	3	2	1	0	2 (Note: Appearances in UEFA Champions League)	0	0	0	16	4
Vitesse (loan)	2013–14	Eredivisie	13	3	0	0	—		—		2 (Note: Appearances in Eredivisie European play-offs)	0	15	3
Vitesse (loan)	2014–15	Eredivisie	29	13	3	3	—		—		4	1	36	17
Vitesse (loan)	Total		42	16	3	3	—		—		6	1	51	20
Ajax (loan)	2016–17	Eredivisie	24	9	0	0	—		15 (Note: Two appearances in UEFA Champions League, eleven appearances and four goals in UEFA Europa League)	4	—		38	13
Lyon	2017–18	Ligue 1	31	13	3	1	0	0	9 (Note: Appearances in UEFA Europa League)	4	—		43	18
Lyon	2018–19	Ligue 1	33	7	4	1	2	2	8	1	—		47	11
Lyon	2019–20	Ligue 1	23	1	3	0	4	2	5	1	—		35	4
Lyon	Total		87	21	10	2	6	4	22	6	—		125	33
Aston Villa	2020–21	Premier League	36	7	0	0	2	1	—		—		38	8
Aston Villa	2021–22	Premier League	9	0	0	0	1	0	—		—		10	0
Aston Villa	2022–23	Premier League	8	2	0	0	0	0	—		—		8	2
Aston Villa	2023–24	Premier League	2	0	0	0	0	0	4 (Note: Appearances in UEFA Europa Conference League)	0	—		6	0
Aston Villa	Total		55	9	0	0	3	1	4	0	—		62	10
İstanbul Başakşehir (loan)	2022–23	Süper Lig	12	2	0	0	—		6	1	—		18	3
Villarreal	2023–24	La Liga	11	1	—		—		0	0	—		11	1
Ajax	2024–25	Eredivisie	32	6	2	0	—		15	4	—		49	10
Ajax	2025–26	Eredivisie	1	0	—		—		—		—		1	0
Ajax	Total		33	6	2	0	—		15	4	—		50	10
Sunderland	2025–26	Premier League	12	1	0	0	—		—		—		12	1
Wolverhampton Wanderers	2026–27	EFL Championship	0	0	0	0	1	0	—		—		1	0
Career total			286	67	18	7	11	5	64	15	6	1	384	95

=== International ===
As of match played 6 January 2026

Appearances and goals by national team and year
National team	Year	Apps	Goals
Burkina Faso	2011	3	0
Burkina Faso	2012	3	0
Burkina Faso	2013	5	1
Burkina Faso	2014	6	0
Burkina Faso	2015	10	2
Burkina Faso	2016	4	0
Burkina Faso	2017	13	4
Burkina Faso	2018	6	1
Burkina Faso	2019	4	1
Burkina Faso	2020	3	2
Burkina Faso	2021	3	1
Burkina Faso	2022	9	3
Burkina Faso	2023	5	2
Burkina Faso	2024	6	4
Burkina Faso	2025	10	1
Burkina Faso	2026	1	0
Total		91	22

Scores and results list Burkina Faso's goal tally first, score column indicates score after each Traoré goal.

List of international goals scored by Bertrand Traoré
No.	Date	Venue	Cap	Opponent	Score	Result	Competition
1	14 August 2013	Grand Stade de Tanger, Tanger, Morocco	9	Morocco	1–0	2–1	Friendly
2	10 January 2015	Mbombela Stadium, Nelspruit, South Africa	18	Swaziland	4–1	5–1	Friendly
3	17 November 2015	Stade du 4 Août, Ouagadougou, Burkina Faso	27	Benin	2–0	2–0	2018 FIFA World Cup qualification
4	7 January 2017	Stade de Marrakech, Marrakesh, Morocco	32	Mali	2–0	2–1	Friendly
5	22 January 2017	Stade de Franceville, Franceville, Gabon	35	Guinea-Bissau	2–0	2–0	2017 Africa Cup of Nations
6	10 June 2017	Stade du 4 Août, Ouagadougou, Burkina Faso	40	Angola	3–1	3–1	2019 Africa Cup of Nations qualification
7	5 September 2017	Stade du 4 Août, Ouagadougou, Burkina Faso	42	Senegal	1–0	2–2	2018 FIFA World Cup qualification
8	28 May 2018	Stade Pierre Brisson, Beauvais, France	47	Cameroon	1–0	1–0	Friendly
9	22 March 2019	Stade du 4 Août, Ouagadougou, Burkina Faso	51	Mauritania	1–0	1–0	2019 Africa Cup of Nations qualification
10	9 October 2020	Stade El Abdi, El Jadida, Morocco	55	DR Congo	1–0	3–0	Friendly
11	12 October 2020	Stade El Abdi, El Jadida, Morocco	56	Madagascar	1–0	2–1	Friendly
12	29 March 2021	Stade du 4 Août, Ouagadougou, Burkina Faso	59	South Sudan	1–0	1–0	2021 Africa Cup of Nations qualification
13	23 January 2022	Limbe Stadium, Limbe, Cameroon	63	Gabon	1–0	1–1 (a.e.t.)	2021 Africa Cup of Nations
14	23 September 2022	Prince Moulay Abdellah Stadium, Rabat, Morocco	67	DR Congo	1–0	1–0	Friendly
15	27 September 2022	Stade Père Jégo, Casablanca, Morocco	68	Comoros	2–0	2–1	Friendly
16	17 November 2023	Stade de Marrakech, Marrakesh, Morocco	73	Guinea-Bissau	1–1	1–1	2026 FIFA World Cup qualification
17	21 November 2023	Stade El Abdi, El Jadida, Morocco	74	Ethiopia	2–0	3–0	2026 FIFA World Cup qualification
18	16 January 2024	Stade de la Paix, Bouaké, Ivory Coast	75	Mauritania	1–0	1–0	2023 Africa Cup of Nations
19	20 January 2024	Stade de la Paix, Bouaké, Ivory Coast	76	Algeria	2–1	2–2	2023 Africa Cup of Nations
20	30 January 2024	Amadou Gon Coulibaly Stadium, Korhogo, Ivory Coast	78	Mali	1–2	1–2	2023 Africa Cup of Nations
21	13 October 2024	Felix Houphouet Boigny Stadium, Abidjan, Ivory Coast	80	Burundi	2–0	2–0	2025 Africa Cup of Nations qualification
22	21 March 2025	Ben M'Hamed El Abdi Stadium, El Jadida, Morocco	81	Djibouti	2–0	4–1	2026 FIFA World Cup qualification

== Honours ==
Ajax

- UEFA Europa League runner-up: 2016–17

Lyon

- Coupe de la Ligue runner-up: 2019–20

Burkina Faso U17

- African U-17 Championship: 2011

Burkina Faso

- Africa Cup of Nations third place: 2017

Individual

- UEFA Europa League Squad of the Season: 2016–17
