= Sidi Bouna Amar =

Mauritanian footballer (born 1998)

Sidi Bouna Amar سيدي بونا عمار
Personal information
- Full name: Sidi Amar Sidi Bouna Amar
- Date of birth: 31 December 1998 (age 27)
- Place of birth: Tevragh-Zeina, Mauritania
- Height: 1.72 m (5 ft 8 in)
- Position: Attacking midfielder

Team information
- Current team: Al-Shomooa (on loan from Al-Ittihad)
- Number: 20

Youth career
- 2019–2020: Numancia B

Senior career*
Years	Team	Apps	(Gls)
2020–2021	ASAC Concorde	3	(0)
2021–2022	ASC Tidjikja	0	(0)
2022–2024	Nouadhibou	7	(1)
2024–2025	Wydad AC	26	(5)
2025–	Al-Ittihad	14	(4)
2026–	→ Al-Shomooa (loan)	2	(1)

International career^{‡}
2022–	Mauritania	28	(2)
- * Club domestic league appearances and goals ‡ National team caps and goals as of 20:55, 5 September 2025

Sidi Amar Sidi Bouna Amar (Arabic: سيدي بونا عمار; born 31 December 1998), is a Mauritanian professional footballer who plays as an attacking midfielder for Libyan Premier League club Al-Shomooa, and the Mauritania national team.

== Career ==
Amar joined the youth academy of the Spanish club Numancia B on 19 September 2019. He began his senior career with ASAC Concorde in the Super D1 in 2020. On 7 October 2021, he transferred to ASC Tidjikja. The following season he moved to Nouadhibou, and helped them win the 2022–23 Super D1 as one of the top scorers in the team.

== International ==
Amar was first called up to the Mauritania national team for the 2022 African Nations Championship. He was called up to the national team for the 2023 Africa Cup of Nations.

== Honours ==
Nouadhibou

- Super D1: 2022–23
