= Bouaké Stadium =

Stadium in Bouaké, Ivory Coast

- Interactive map of Bouaké Stadium
- Location: Bouaké, Ivory Coast
- Coordinates: 7°40′58″N 5°2′41″W
- Capacity: 40,000
- Surface: Grass
- Field size: 119 × 73 m

Construction
- Opened: 1984
- Renovated: 2020–2022
- Architect: Quadrante Arquitectura
- General contractor: Mota-Engil (2020 renovations)

Tenants
- ASC Bouaké; Alliance Bouaké; Bouaké FC (2007–present); Ivory Coast national football team (selected matches)

Bouaké Stadium is a multi-use stadium in Bouaké, Côte d'Ivoire. It is currently used mostly for football matches. The stadium holds 40,000 people. Along with Stade Félix Houphouët-Boigny, it was constructed for the 1984 African Nations Cup. It was one of the host stadiums for the 2023 Africa Cup of Nations, and is currently being renovated for the competition by Mota-Engil, with structures designed by Quadrante Group.

== History ==
The stadium was constructed in 1984 as part of Ivory Coast's plan to host the 1984 African Cup of Nations, with Felix Houphouet Boigny Stadium in the capital at that time, Abidjan, stade de la paix hosted a total of 7 games, including 6 in the group stage and 1 in the knockout stage of that competition. The competition ended with the victory of Cameroun over Nigeria, with a score of 3–1. The Ivory Coast team did not advance beyond the group stage, with only 1 win and two losses.

During the Ivorian crisis (from October 2002 to March 2007), all sporting activities were canceled, and the stadium was abandoned due to occupation by the Forces nouvelles de Côte d'Ivoire (New Forces). According to testimonies from residents of Bouaké, the stadium was allegedly used as an execution site for police officers, and military soldiers from the government's forces by the New Forces.

The Stadium, with dimensions of 119 × 73 meters (football-rugby), was designed in the shape of an oval crown with a total of 24 stands. It serves as the home ground for three major clubs: ASC Bouaké, Alliance Bouaké, and Bouaké Football Club, the latter of which joined the league in 2014.

On July 30, 2007, a match was held between Ivory Coast and Madagascar, during the Flame of Peace, holds great significance for national reconciliation. It was part of the Ouagadougou Agreement. This match garnered significant interest, with Ivory Coast winning 5–0.

== Rehabilitation and renovation ==
=== Rehabilitation in 2007 ===
The stadium was undergoing rehabilitation, in line with the ongoing process of modernizing Ivorian stadiums, with the Ivorian Football Federation overseeing the work. Nothing was overlooked, from the pitch to the official lodges, press cabins, dressing rooms, and stands. The renovation was scheduled for completion by June 3, 2007. According to sources (as revealed by L'Inter), the total cost of this rehabilitation was estimated to be between 200 and 300 million CFA francs (approximately €305,000 to €457,400), or even more.And in 2008 this stadium held the return match between Ivory Coast and Madagascar in the 2008 Africa Cup of Nations qualifications, in accordance with the wishes of Didier Drogba, the African Ballon d'Or winner in 2006 and captain of the Elephants.

the rehabilitation of this Stadium included Clear delineation of player and official access areas, with complete renovation of dressing rooms. Adherence to stringent safety standards. Thorough maintenance of the pitch. The official lodge, stands, dressing rooms, protective barriers, and the infirmary underwent a complete overhaul. Additionally, showers and toilets for players and the general public were revamped. Concerning security, no measures were spared, including the construction of walls at the exit of the dressing rooms to prevent any contact between players and the public. According to experts from the Ivorian Football Federation and the Ministry, everything was done in accordance with FIFA's international standards. However, concerns remain regarding the quality of the pitch.

=== Renovation 2018–2020 ===
In anticipation of the 2021 Africa Cup of Nations, Ivory Coast initiated expansion works to increase the stadium's capacity to 40,000 seats, in accordance with the CAF requirements. These works has been supervised by the Mota Engil company to transform the facility into an English-style stadium, without an athletics track, and feature a roof structure above the stands. But On 30 November 2018, CAF stripped Cameroon of hosting the 2019 Africa Cup of Nations because of delays in the construction of stadiums and other necessary infrastructure; it was relocated to Egypt. CAF President at the time, Ahmad Ahmad, said that Cameroon had agreed to host the 2021 tournament instead. Consequently, Ivory Coast, original hosts of 2021, will host the 2023 Africa Cup of Nations. On 30 January 2019, the CAF President confirmed the timetable shift, after a meeting with Ivory Coast President, Alassane Ouattara, in Abidjan, Ivory Coast.

=== Renovation 2023 ===
The stadium was renovated as part of the 2023 Africa Cup of Nations scheduled for January 2024. It has become the second largest stadium in the country, its capacity has been increased from 25,000 to 40,000 seats.

== Events ==
=== 2023 Africa Cup of Nations ===
The stadium was one of the venues for the 2023 Africa Cup of Nations.

The following matches were played at the stadium:

Date	Time (GMT)	Team #1	Result	Team #2	Round	Spectators
15 January 2024	20:00	Algeria	1–1	Angola	Group D	19,740
16 January 2024	14:00	Burkina Faso	1–0	Mauritania	Group D	27,898
20 January 2024	14:00	Algeria	2–2	Burkina Faso	Group D	33,501
20 January 2024	17:00	Mauritania	2–3	Angola	Group D	36,318
23 January 2024	17:00	Gambia	2–3	Cameroon	Group C	24,172
23 January 2024	20:00	Mauritania	1–0	Algeria	Group D	28,010
27 January 2024	17:00	Angola	3–0	Namibia	Round of 16	28,663
3 February 2024	17:00	Mali	1–2 (a.e.t.)	Ivory Coast	Quarter-finals	39,836
7 February 2024	17:00	Nigeria	1–1 (a.e.t.) (4–2 p)	South Africa	Semi-finals	31,227

== See also ==
- List of football stadiums in Ivory Coast
- List of African stadiums by capacity
- List of association football stadiums by capacity
