= 2024 King Cup final =

- Event: 2023–24 King Cup
| Al-Hilal | Al-Nassr |
| 1 | 1 |
- After extra time Al-Hilal won 5–4 on penalties
- Date: 31 May 2024
- Venue: King Abdullah Sports City, Jeddah
- Man of the Match: Yassine Bounou
- Referee: Darío Herrera (Argentina)
- Attendance: 56,870
- Weather: Clear; 30.5 °C (86.9 °F); 53% humidity

The 2024 King Cup final was the 49th final of the King Cup, Saudi Arabia's main football knock-out competition since its inception in 1957.

The final was played at the King Abdullah Sports City in Jeddah, on 31 May 2024. The match was contested by derby rivals Al-Hilal and Al-Nassr. It was Al-Hilal's 19th King Cup final and Al-Nassr's 14th.

Al-Hilal defeated Al-Nassr on penalties in the final following a 1–1 draw after extra time to win their 11th title.

== Teams ==
| Team | Previous finals appearances (bold indicates winners) |
|---|---|
| Al-Hilal | 18 (**1961**, 1963, **1964**, 1968, 1977, **1980**, 1981, **1982**, **1984**, 1985, 1987, **1989**, 2010, **2015**, **2017**, **2020**, 2022, **2023**) |
| Al-Nassr | 14 (1967, 1971, 1973, **1974**, **1976**, **1981**, **1986**, **1987**, 1989, **1990**, 2012, 2015, 2016, 2020) |

== Venue ==
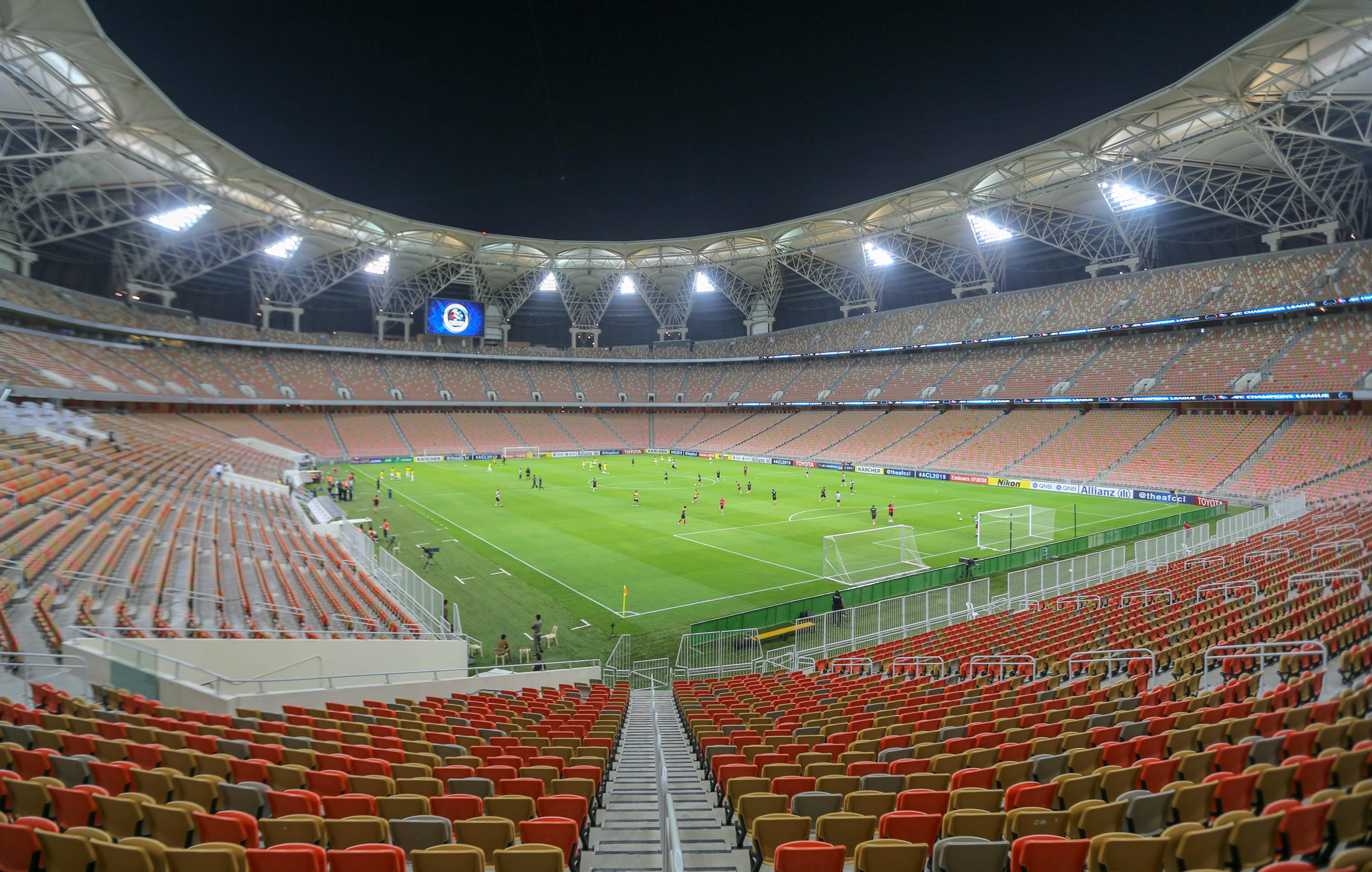
The King Abdullah Sports City in Jeddah hosted the final

The King Abdullah Sports City, also known as the Jewel Stadium, was announced as the venue of the final on 26 May 2024. This was the eighth time the King Abdullah Sports City hosted the final following those in 2014, 2015, 2016, 2017, 2018, 2022, and 2023 and was the sixteenth time it was hosted in Jeddah.

The King Abdullah Sports City was built in 2012 and opened in 2014 as the home of Al-Ahli, Al-Ittihad and the Saudi Arabia national team. Its current capacity is 62,345, and the record attendance was the opening match which was the 2014 King Cup final. The stadium also hosted many other finals including the 2019 Saudi Super Cup, the 2018 Supercoppa Italiana, and the 2019–20 Supercopa de España.

== Background ==
Al-Hilal reached their record-breaking 19th final after a 2–1 win against Al-Ittihad. This was Al-Hilal's third consecutive final, fourth final in five years, and seventh final since the tournament was reintroduced. Al-Hilal won last season's final on penalties after a 1–1 draw against Al-Wehda.

Al-Nassr reached their fourteenth final after a 3–1 win against Al-Khaleej. This was Al-Nassr's first final since 2020, and fifth final since the tournament was reintroduced. Al-Nassr lost their four most recent finals against Al-Ahli and Al-Hilal twice each.

The two teams met four times earlier in the season with Al-Hilal winning twice, Al-Nassr winning once, and one draw between them. This was the 21st meeting between these two sides in the King Cup and the sixth meeting in the final. Al-Hilal won ten times including the 1989 Final and 2020 Final, while Al-Nassr won four times including the 1981 Final and 1987 Final. The two teams drew each other six times, with Al-Hilal winning the 2015 Final on penalty shoot-outs. This was the 184th competitive meeting between these two sides. In the clubs' 183 previous meetings, Al-Hilal won 72, Al-Nassr won 59 and the remaining 52 were drawn.

== Road to the final ==
Note: In all results below, the score of the finalist is given first (H: home; A: away).

| Al-Hilal | | Round | Al-Nassr |
|---|---|---|---|---|
| Opponent | Result | 2023–24 King Cup | Opponent | Result |
| Al-Jabalain (A) | 1–0 | Round of 32 | Ohod (A) | 5–1 |
| Al-Hazem (H) | 3–0 | Round of 16 | Al-Ettifaq (H) | 1–0 (a.e.t.) |
| Al-Taawoun (H) | 3–0 | Quarter-finals | Al-Shabab (A) | 5–2 |
| Al-Ittihad (A) | 2–1 | Semi-finals | Al-Khaleej (H) | 3–1 |

== Match ==
=== Details ===
31 May 2024
21:00 AST

| Al-Hilal | 1–1 (a.e.t.) | Al-Nassr |
|---|---|---|
| Mitrović 7' | Report | Yahya 88' |
Penalties
| Neves (penalty missed); Mitrović (penalty scored); Kanno (penalty scored); Tambakti (penalty scored); Al-Hamdan (penalty scored); Abdulhamid (penalty missed); N. Al-Dawsari (penalty scored) | 5–4 | (penalty missed) Telles; (penalty scored) Ronaldo; (penalty scored) Al-Najei; (penalty scored) Ghareeb; (penalty scored) Lajami; (penalty missed) Al-Hassan; (penalty missed) Al-Nemer |

King Abdullah Sports City, Jeddah
Attendance: 56,870
Referee: Darío Herrera (Argentina)

| **Al-Hilal** | **Al-Nassr** |

| GK | 37 | (Morocco) Yassine Bounou |
| RB | 66 | (Saudi Arabia) Saud Abdulhamid |
| CB | 3 | (Senegal) Kalidou Koulibaly | (yellow card) 28' (yellow-red card) 90' |
| CB | 5 | (Saudi Arabia) Ali Al-Bulaihi | (yellow card) 87' (red card) 87' |
| LB | 6 | (Brazil) Renan Lodi | (yellow card) 22' | (substituted off) 46' |
| CM | 8 | (Portugal) Rúben Neves |
| CM | 7 | (Saudi Arabia) Salman Al-Faraj (c) | (yellow card) 33' | (substituted off) 74' |
| RW | 96 | (Brazil) Michael | (yellow card) 40' | (substituted off) 86' |
| AM | 77 | (Brazil) Malcom | | (substituted off) 109' |
| LW | 29 | (Saudi Arabia) Salem Al-Dawsari | | (substituted off) 110' |
| CF | 9 | (Serbia) Aleksandar Mitrović |
Substitutes:
| GK | 21 | (Saudi Arabia) Mohammed Al-Owais |
| DF | 2 | (Saudi Arabia) Mohammed Al-Breik | | (substituted on) 86' (substituted off) 90+7' |
| DF | 12 | (Saudi Arabia) Yasser Al-Shahrani | (yellow card) 98' | (substituted on) 46' |
| DF | 16 | (Saudi Arabia) Nasser Al-Dawsari | | (substituted on) 109' |
| DF | 87 | (Saudi Arabia) Hassan Al-Tombakti | | (substituted on) 90+7' |
| MF | 28 | (Saudi Arabia) Mohamed Kanno | (yellow card) 108' | (substituted on) 74' |
| MF | 56 | (Saudi Arabia) Mohammed Al-Qahtani |
| FW | 11 | (Saudi Arabia) Saleh Al-Shehri |
| FW | 14 | (Saudi Arabia) Abdullah Al-Hamdan | | (substituted on) 110' |
Manager:
(Portugal) Jorge Jesus

| GK | 26 | (Colombia) David Ospina | (red card) 56' |
| RB | 2 | (Saudi Arabia) Sultan Al-Ghannam | (yellow card) 120+1' |
| CB | 5 | (Saudi Arabia) Abdulelah Al-Amri | (yellow card) 45+1' | (substituted off) 59' |
| CB | 78 | (Saudi Arabia) Ali Lajami |
| LB | 15 | (Brazil) Alex Telles | (yellow card) 106' |
| DM | 17 | (Saudi Arabia) Abdullah Al-Khaibari |
| CM | 77 | (Croatia) Marcelo Brozović | | (substituted off) 69' |
| CM | 25 | (Portugal) Otávio | (yellow card) 26' | (substituted off) 81' |
| RM | 23 | (Saudi Arabia) Ayman Yahya | | (substituted off) 105' |
| LM | 10 | (Senegal) Sadio Mané | | (substituted off) 59' |
| CF | 7 | (Portugal) Cristiano Ronaldo (c) |
Substitutes:
| GK | 33 | (Saudi Arabia) Waleed Abdullah | | (substituted on) 59' |
| DF | 4 | (Saudi Arabia) Mohammed Al-Fatil |
| DF | 12 | (Saudi Arabia) Nawaf Boushal |
| DF | 24 | (Saudi Arabia) Mohammed Qasem |
| MF | 8 | (Saudi Arabia) Abdulmajeed Al-Sulaiheem |
| MF | 14 | (Saudi Arabia) Sami Al-Najei | | (substituted on) 69' |
| MF | 19 | (Saudi Arabia) Ali Al-Hassan | | (substituted on) 81' |
| MF | 29 | (Saudi Arabia) Abdulrahman Ghareeb | | (substituted on) 59' |
| FW | 30 | (Saudi Arabia) Meshari Al-Nemer | | (substituted on) 105' |
Manager:
(Portugal) Luís Castro

Man of the Match:
Yassine Bounou (Al-Hilal)

Assistant referees:
Miguel Savorani (Argentina)
Sebastían Raineri (Argentina)
Fourth official:
Sebastían Zunino (Argentina)
Video assistant referee:
Jorge Baliño (Argentina)
Assistant video assistant referee:
Silvio Trucco (Argentina)

**Match rules**

- 90 minutes
- 30 minutes of extra time if necessary
- Penalty shoot-out if scores still level
- Nine named substitutes
- Maximum of five substitutions, with a sixth allowed in extra time.

=== Statistics ===
First half
| Statistic | Al-Hilal | Al-Nassr |
|---|---|---|
| Goals scored | 1 | 0 |
| Total shots | 2 | 6 |
| Shots on target | 1 | 3 |
| Saves | 3 | 0 |
| Ball possession | 51% | 49% |
| Corner kicks | 2 | 3 |
| Offsides | 1 | 3 |
| Yellow cards | 4 | 2 |
| Red cards | 0 | 0 |

Second half
| Statistic | Al-Hilal | Al-Nassr |
|---|---|---|
| Goals scored | 0 | 1 |
| Total shots | 5 | 8 |
| Shots on target | 3 | 3 |
| Saves | 2 | 3 |
| Ball possession | 59% | 41% |
| Corner kicks | 1 | 1 |
| Offsides | 0 | 2 |
| Yellow cards | 0 | 0 |
| Red cards | 2 | 1 |

Extra time
| Statistic | Al-Hilal | Al-Nassr |
|---|---|---|
| Goals scored | 0 | 0 |
| Total shots | 4 | 6 |
| Shots on target | 1 | 0 |
| Saves | 0 | 1 |
| Ball possession | 46% | 54% |
| Corner kicks | 1 | 0 |
| Offsides | 1 | 7 |
| Yellow cards | 2 | 2 |
| Red cards | 0 | 0 |

Overall
| Statistic | Al-Hilal | Al-Nassr |
|---|---|---|
| Goals scored | 1 | 1 |
| Total shots | 11 | 20 |
| Shots on target | 5 | 6 |
| Saves | 5 | 4 |
| Ball possession | 53% | 47% |
| Corner kicks | 4 | 4 |
| Fouls committed | 23 | 17 |
| Offsides | 2 | 12 |
| Yellow cards | 6 | 4 |
| Red cards | 2 | 1 |

== See also ==
- 2023–24 King Cup
- 2023–24 Saudi Professional League
- 2024 Saudi Super Cup
