= 2020 King Cup final =

- Event: 2019–20 King Cup
Al-Hilal	Al-Nassr
2	1
- Date: 28 November 2020
- Venue: King Fahd International Stadium, Riyadh
- Referee: Szymon Marciniak (Poland)
- Attendance: 0 (Note: The final was played behind closed doors due to the COVID-19 pandemic in Saudi Arabia.)
- Weather: Partly cloudy 22 °C (72 °F); 65% humidity

The 2020 King Cup final was the 45th final of the King Cup, Saudi Arabia's main football knock-out competition.

It was played at the King Fahd International Stadium, Riyadh, on 28 November 2020; it was originally scheduled for May but was delayed due to the COVID-19 pandemic in Saudi Arabia. The match was contested between Al-Hilal and Al-Nassr. It was Al-Hilal's 16th King Cup final and Al-Nassr's 14th. This was the fifth meeting between these two clubs in the final. The match was held behind closed doors.

Al-Hilal won the game 2–1 to secure their ninth title.

== Teams ==
Team	Previous finals appearances (bold indicates winners)
Al-Hilal	15 (**1961**, 1963, **1964**, 1968, 1977, **1980**, 1981, **1982**, **1984**, 1985, 1987, **1989**, 2010, **2015**, **2017**)
Al-Nassr	13 (1967, 1971, 1973, **1974**, **1976**, **1981**, **1986**, **1987**, 1989, **1990**, 2012, 2015, 2016)

== Venue ==
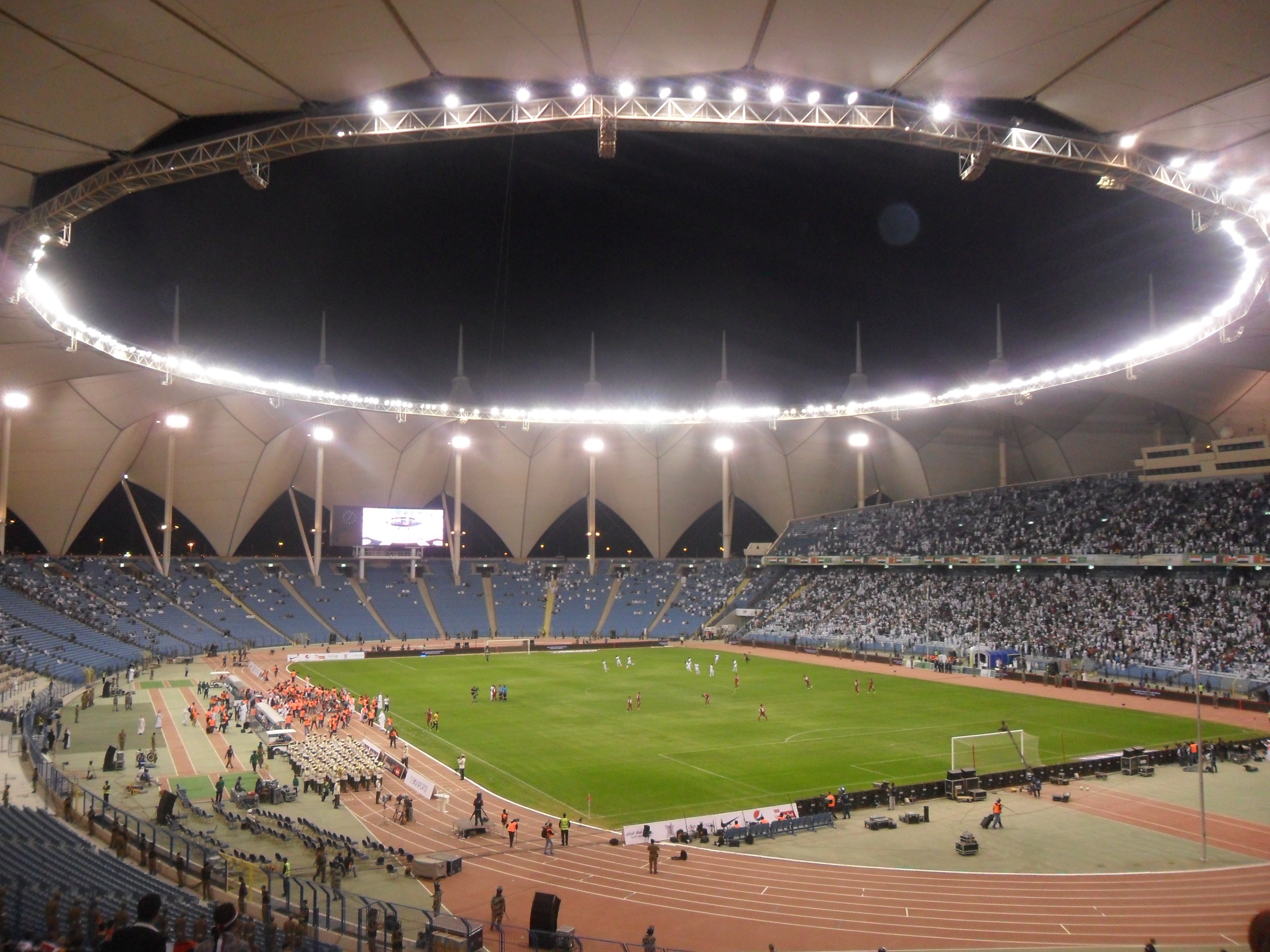
The King Fahd International Stadium in Riyadh hosted the final

The King Fahd International Stadium was announced as the final venue on 13 November 2020. This was the seventh King Cup final hosted in the King Fahd International Stadium following those in 1988, 2008, 2009, 2010, 2013 and 2019.

The King Fahd International Stadium was built in 1982 and was opened in 1987. The stadium was used as a venue for the 1992, 1995, and the 1997 editions of the FIFA Confederations Cup. Its current capacity is 68,752 and it is used by the Saudi Arabia national football team, Al-Hilal, Al-Shabab, and major domestic matches.

== Background ==
Al-Hilal reached their 16th final after a 2–0 win against Abha. This was Al-Hilal's first final since 2017, and fourth final since the tournament was reintroduced. Al-Hilal won their two most recent finals against Al-Ahli and Al-Nassr.

Al-Nassr reached their 14th final, after a 2–1 away win against Al-Ahli. This was Al-Nassr's first final since 2016, and fourth final since the tournament was reintroduced. Al-Nassr lost their three most recent finals against Al-Ahli twice and Al-Hilal once.

The two teams met earlier in the week in the fifth round of the Pro League. Al-Hilal defeated Al-Nassr 2–0 thanks to goals from Bafétimbi Gomis and Saleh Al-Shehri. This was the 19th meeting between these two sides in the King Cup and fifth meeting in the final. Al-Hilal won eight times including the 1989 Final, while Al-Nassr won four times including the 1981 Final and 1987 Final. The two teams drew each other six times, with Al-Hilal winning the 2015 Final on penalty shoot-outs. This was the 169th competitive meeting between these two sides.

== Road to the final ==
Note: In all results below, the score of the finalist is given first (H: home; A: away).

Al-Hilal		Round	Al-Nassr
Opponent	Result	2019–20 King Cup	Opponent	Result
Arar (H)	4–1	Round of 64	Afif (A)	5–1
Al-Jabalain (H)	4–2	Round of 32	Al-Bukayriyah (H)	4–1
Al-Faisaly (A)	2–2 (6–5 p)	Round of 16	Damac (A)	4–2
Al-Ettifaq (H)	2–1	Quarter-finals	Al-Adalah (A)	1–0
Abha (H)	2–0	Semi-finals	Al-Ahli (A)	2–1

== Match ==
=== Details ===
28 November 2020
19:45 AST

Al-Hilal	2–1	Al-Nassr
Jang Hyun-soo 10'; Gomis 42' (pen.)	Report	Yahya 71'

King Fahd International Stadium, Riyadh
Attendance: 0
Referee: Szymon Marciniak (Poland)

**Al-Hilal**	**Al-Nassr**

GK	31	(Saudi Arabia) Habib Al-Wotayan	(yellow card) 90+5'
RB	2	(Saudi Arabia) Mohammed Al-Breik		(substituted off) 89'
CB	5	(Saudi Arabia) Ali Al-Bulaihi
CB	20	(South Korea) Jang Hyun-soo
LB	12	(Saudi Arabia) Yasser Al-Shahrani
DM	6	(Colombia) Gustavo Cuéllar	(yellow card) 33'
DM	7	(Saudi Arabia) Salman Al-Faraj (c)
RW	19	(Peru) André Carrillo		(substituted off) 79'
AM	9	(Italy) Sebastian Giovinco		(substituted off) 71'
LW	29	(Saudi Arabia) Salem Al-Dawsari
CF	18	(France) Bafétimbi Gomis
Substitutes:
GK	33	(Saudi Arabia) Abdullah Al-Jadaani
DF	23	(Saudi Arabia) Madallah Al-Olayan		(substituted on) 89'
DF	70	(Saudi Arabia) Mohammed Jahfali
MF	8	(Saudi Arabia) Abdullah Otayf
MF	27	(Saudi Arabia) Hattan Bahebri
MF	28	(Saudi Arabia) Mohamed Kanno		(substituted on) 79'
FW	10	(Argentina) Luciano Vietto		(substituted on) 71'
FW	11	(Saudi Arabia) Saleh Al-Shehri
FW	77	(Syria) Omar Kharbin
Manager:
(Romania) Răzvan Lucescu

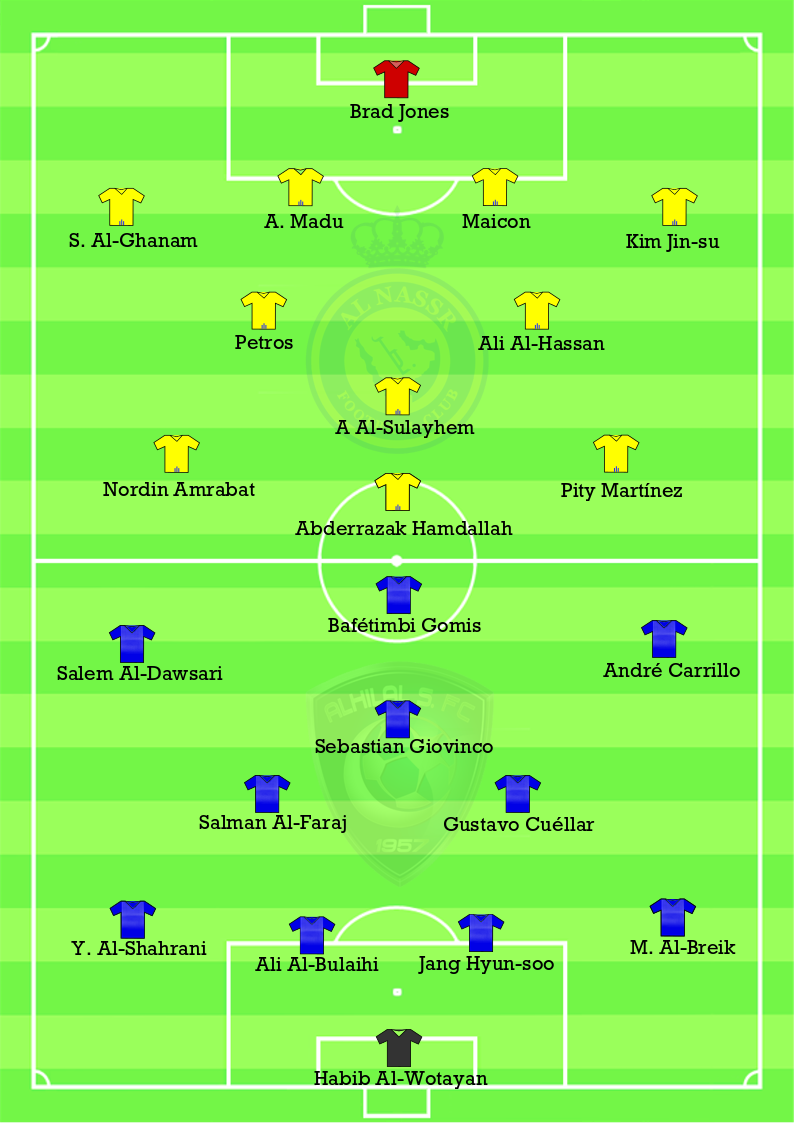

GK	1	(Australia) Brad Jones
RB	2	(Saudi Arabia) Sultan Al-Ghanam	(yellow card) 4'	(substituted off) 46'
CB	3	(Saudi Arabia) Abdullah Madu
CB	18	(Brazil) Maicon
LB	28	(South Korea) Kim Jin-su
DM	6	(Brazil) Petros
DM	8	(Saudi Arabia) Abdulmajeed Al-Sulayhem	(yellow card) 54'	(substituted off) 46'
RW	10	(Argentina) Gonzalo Martínez		(substituted off) 65'
AM	19	(Saudi Arabia) Ali Al-Hassan
LW	11	(Morocco) Nordin Amrabat		(substituted off) 79'
CF	9	(Morocco) Abderrazak Hamdallah (c)
Substitutes:
GK	33	(Saudi Arabia) Waleed Abdullah
DF	5	(Saudi Arabia) Abdulelah Al-Amri
DF	13	(Saudi Arabia) Abdulrahman Al-Obaid
DF	78	(Saudi Arabia) Ali Lajami		(substituted on) 46'
MF	17	(Saudi Arabia) Abdullah Al-Khaibari
MF	23	(Saudi Arabia) Ayman Yahya	(yellow card) 83'	(substituted on) 46'
MF	24	(Saudi Arabia) Khalid Al-Ghannam		(substituted on) 65'
MF	39	(Saudi Arabia) Abdulrahman Al-Dawsari
FW	70	(Saudi Arabia) Raed Al-Ghamdi		(substituted on) 79'
Manager:
(Portugal) Rui Vitória

Assistant referees:
Pawel Sokolnicki (Poland)
Tomasz Musiał (Poland)
Fourth official:
Khaled Al-Teris
Video assistant referee:
Zbigniew Dobrynin (Poland)
Assistant video assistant referees:
Omar Al-Jaml

**Match rules**

- 90 minutes
- 30 minutes of extra time if necessary
- Penalty shoot-out if scores still level
- Nine named substitutes
- Maximum of five substitutions, with a sixth allowed in extra time (Note: Each team was given only three opportunities to make substitutions, with a fourth opportunity in extra time, excluding substitutions made at half-time, before the start of extra time and at half-time in extra time.)

=== Statistics ===
First half
Statistic	Al-Hilal	Al-Nassr
Goals scored	2	0
Total shots	5	8
Shots on target	3	1
Saves	1	0
Ball possession	59%	41%
Corner kicks	1	6
Fouls committed	13	10
Offsides	1	2
Yellow cards	1	1
Red cards	0	0

Second half
Statistic	Al-Hilal	Al-Nassr
Goals scored	0	1
Total shots	1	11
Shots on target	1	6
Saves	4	1
Ball possession	45%	55%
Corner kicks	0	3
Fouls committed	3	11
Offsides	1	1
Yellow cards	1	2
Red cards	0	0

Overall
Statistic	Al-Hilal	Al-Nassr
Goals scored	2	1
Total shots	6	19
Shots on target	4	7
Saves	5	1
Ball possession	53%	47%
Corner kicks	1	9
Fouls committed	16	21
Offsides	2	3
Yellow cards	2	3
Red cards	0	0

== See also ==
- 2019–20 King Cup
- 2019–20 Saudi Professional League
- 2020 Saudi Super Cup
