= 2016 King Cup final =

- Event: 2016 King Cup
Al-Ahli	Al-Nassr
2	1
- After extra time
- Date: 29 May 2016
- Venue: King Abdullah Sports City, Jeddah
- Referee: Carlos Velasco Carballo (Spain)
- Attendance: 53,465
- Weather: Clear; 29 °C (84 °F); 50% humidity

The 2016 King Cup final was the final match of the 2016 King Cup, the 41st season of Saudi's main football cup, and the 9th season under the current King Cup title. It was played at the King Abdullah Sports City in Jeddah on 29 May 2016, between Al-Ahli and Al-Nassr.

Al-Ahli took the lead with a 24th-minute header goal by Omar Al Somah, but Ahmed Al-Fraidi equalised for Al-Nassr in the 61st minute to take the match to the extra time. Al Somah scored again to earn Al-Ahli a historic double of Pro League and the King Cup, which was the second time in their history after the 1977–78 season.

== Qualified teams ==
Team	Previous finals appearances (bold indicates winners)
Al-Ahli	16 (**1962**, **1965**, **1969**, **1970**, **1971**, **1973**, 1974, 1976, **1977**, **1978**, **1979**, **1983**, 1984, **2011**, **2012**, 2014)
Al-Nassr	12 (1967, 1971, 1973, **1974**, **1976**, **1981**, **1986**, **1987**, 1989, **1990**, 2012, 2015)

== Road to the final ==
Note: In all results below, the score of the finalist is given first (H: home; A: away).

Al-Ahli		Round	Al-Nassr
Opponent	Result		Opponent	Result
Al-Tai	3–0 (H)	Round of 32	Al-Diriyah	7–0 (A)
Damac	2–1 (A)	Round of 16	Al-Shoulla	2–1 (A)
Al-Raed	3–1 (A)	Quarter-finals	Al-Orobah	3–1 (H)
Al-Hilal	3–2 (a.e.t.) (A)	Semi-finals	Al-Ittihad	3–1 (A)

== Background ==
Al-Ahli played the 17th final, and 4th under the current edition, of which they have won twelve, a record of the competition. Their most recent final was in 2014, losing 0–3 to Al-Shabab, and their last victory was in 2012, defeating Al-Nassr 4–1.

It was Al-Nassr's second consecutive final and the 13th overall, the 3rd under the current edition. They had won six. They lost in the last year's final 6–7 on penalties after a 1–1 draw against Al-Hilal. Their last victory was in 1990, defeating Al-Taawoun 2–0.

Al-Ahli and Al-Nassr contested in five finals. Al-Ahli won thrice, the first was in 1971 with a 2–0 victory, the second was in 1973 they won 2–1, and the last victory 4–1 was in 2012. While Al-Nassr won twice, a 1–0 victory in 1974 and consecutive winning with 2–0 in 1976.

== Match ==
29 May 2016
21:00 AST
(UTC+3)

Al-Ahli	2–1 (a.e.t.)	Al-Nassr
Al-Somah 24', 115'	Report	Al-Fraidi 61'

King Abdullah Sports City, Jeddah
Attendance: 53,465
Referee: Carlos Velasco Carballo (Spain)

**Al-Ahli**	**Al-Nassr**

GK	1	(Saudi Arabia) Yasser Al Mosailem
RB	21	(Saudi Arabia) Ageel Balghaith
CB	3	(Saudi Arabia) Osama Hawsawi
CB	25	(Saudi Arabia) Motaz Hawsawi
LB	13	(Egypt) Mohamed Abdel-Shafy
RM	10	(Greece) Giannis Fetfatzidis		(substituted off) 119'
CM	8	(Saudi Arabia) Taisir Al-Jassim (c)
CM	11	(Saudi Arabia) Housain Al-Mogahwi		(substituted off) 68'
LM	24	(Saudi Arabia) Salman Al-Moasher		(substituted off) 94'
AM	70	(Brazil) Marquinho
CF	9	(Syria) Omar Al Somah	(yellow card) 116'
Substitutes:
GK	22	(Saudi Arabia) Abdullah Al-Mayouf
DF	6	(Saudi Arabia) Mohammed Al Fatil
DF	31	(Saudi Arabia) Mansoor Al-Harbi		(substituted on) 119'
DF	77	(Saudi Arabia) Amiri Kurdi
DF	99	(Saudi Arabia) Kamel Al-Mousa
FW	14	(Saudi Arabia) Muhannad Assiri	(yellow card) 120+3'	(substituted on) 100'
FW	20	(Saudi Arabia) Islam Seraj		(substituted on) 68'
Manager:
(Switzerland) Christian Gross

GK	22	(Saudi Arabia) Abdullah Al-Enezi
RB	12	(Saudi Arabia) Khalid Al-Ghamdi
CB	4	(Saudi Arabia) Omar Hawsawi		(substituted off) 110'
CB	2	(Bahrain) Mohamed Husain
LB	24	(Saudi Arabia) Hussein Abdulghani (c)	(yellow card) 88'
RM	26	(Saudi Arabia) Shaya Sharahili		(substituted off) 46'
CM	16	(Saudi Arabia) Abdulaziz Al-Jebreen
CM	27	(Saudi Arabia) Awadh Khamis	(yellow card) 72'
LM	86	(Poland) Adrian Mierzejewski
CF	9	(Saudi Arabia) Naif Hazazi		(substituted off) 54'
CF	25	(Mali) Modibo Maïga
Substitutes:
GK	31	(Saudi Arabia) Mutaeb Sharahili
DF	3	(Saudi Arabia) Abdullah Madu		(substituted on) 110'
DF	5	(Saudi Arabia) Jamaan Al-Dossari
MF	8	(Saudi Arabia) Yahya Al-Shehri		(substituted on) 46'
MF	15	(Saudi Arabia) Ahmed Al-Fraidi	(red card) 120+2'	(substituted on) 54'
FW	10	(Saudi Arabia) Mohammad Al-Sahlawi
FW	99	(Saudi Arabia) Hassan Al-Raheb
Manager:
(Spain) Raúl Caneda

Assistant referees:
Roberto Alonso Fernández (Spain)
Juan Carlos Jiménez (Spain)
Fourth official:
Shukri Al-Hunfush

**Match rules**

- 90 minutes.
- 30 minutes of extra time if necessary.
- Penalty shoot-out if scores still level.
- Seven named substitutes, of which up to three may be used.
