= 2022 King Cup final =

- Event: 2021–22 King Cup
Al-Fayha	Al-Hilal
1	1
- After extra time Al-Fayha won 3–1 on penalties
- Date: 19 May 2022
- Venue: King Abdullah Sports City, Jeddah
- Man of the Match: Sami Al-Khaibari (Al-Fayha)
- Referee: Antonio Mateu Lahoz (Spain)
- Attendance: 46,533
- Weather: Clear; 32 °C (90 °F); 54% humidity

The 2022 King Cup final was the 47th final of the King Cup, Saudi Arabia's main football knock-out competition since its inception in 1957.

The final was played at the King Abdullah Sports City in Jeddah, on 19 May 2022. The match was contested by Al-Fayha and Al-Hilal. It was Al-Fayha's 1st King Cup final and Al-Hilal's 17th. This was the first meeting between these two sides in the King Cup.

Al-Fayha won their first King Cup title by beating Al-Hilal on penalties following a 1–1 draw after extra time. In doing so, they became the 10th different team to win the King Cup. As winners of the competition, Al-Fayha qualified for the 2023–24 AFC Champions League qualifying play-offs.

== Teams ==
Team	Previous finals appearances (bold indicates winners)
Al-Hilal	16 (**1961**, 1963, **1964**, 1968, 1977, **1980**, 1981, **1982**, **1984**, 1985, 1987, **1989**, 2010, **2015**, **2017**, **2020**)
Al-Fayha	None

== Venue ==
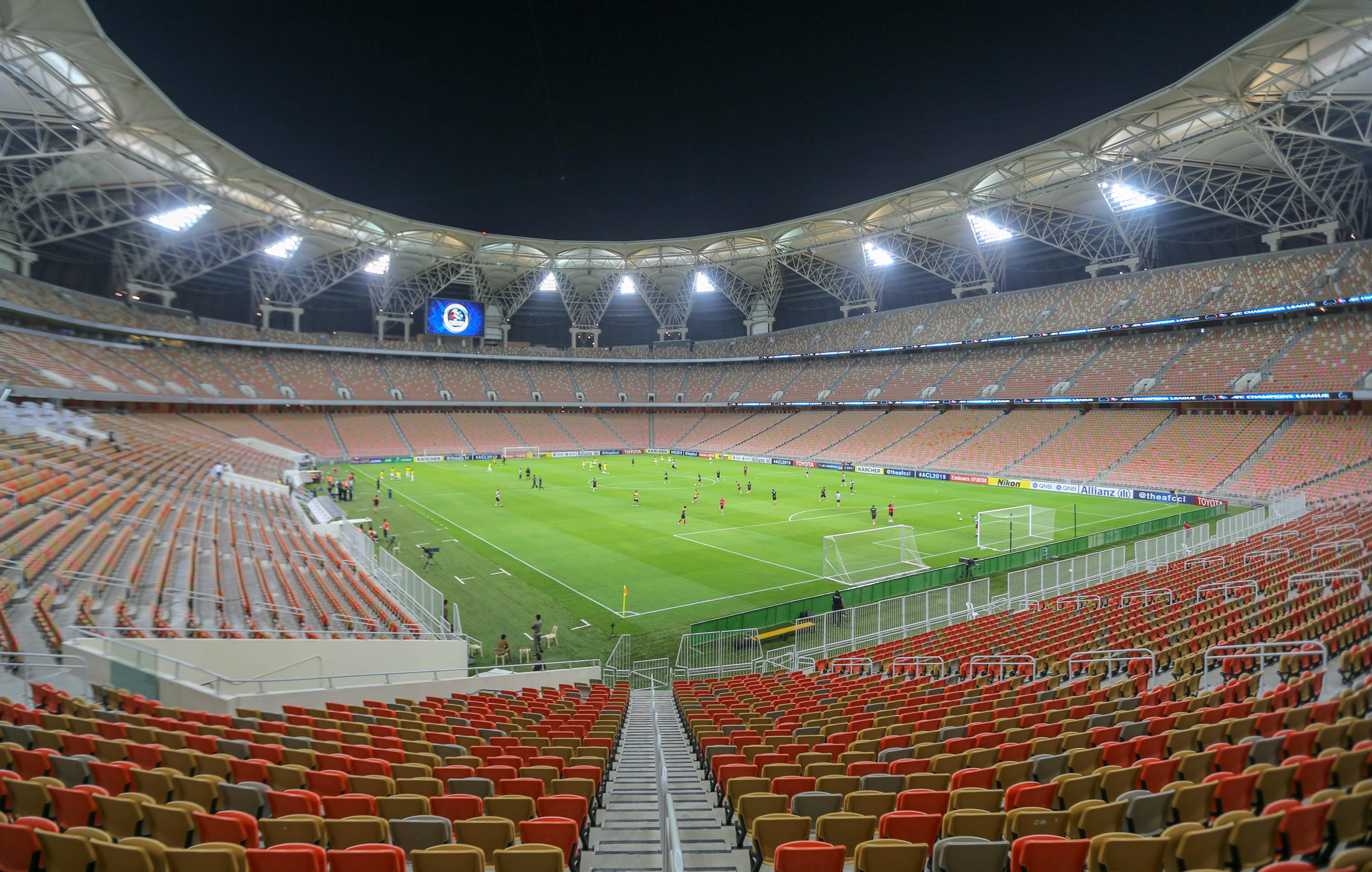
The King Abdullah Sports City in Jeddah hosted the final

The King Abdullah Sports City, also known as the Jewel Stadium, was announced as the venue of the final on 14 May 2022. This was the sixth time the King Abdullah Sports City hosted the final following those in 2014, 2015, 2016, 2017, and 2018 and was the fourteenth time it was hosted in Jeddah.

The King Abdullah Sports City was built in 2012, and opened in 2014 as the home of Al-Ahli, Al-Ittihad and the Saudi Arabia national team. Its current capacity is 62,345, and the record attendance was the opening match which was the 2014 King Cup final. The final also hosted many other finals including the 2019 Saudi Super Cup, the 2018 Supercoppa Italiana and the 2019–20 Supercopa de España.

== Background ==
Al-Fayha reached their first final after a 1–0 home win against Al-Ittihad. Al-Fayha became the eleventh side to feature in a King Cup final.

Al-Hilal reached their 17th final after a 2–1 win against derby rivals Al-Shabab. This was Al-Hilal's second final in three years, and fifth final since the tournament was reintroduced. Al-Hilal won their three most recent finals against Al-Ahli once and Al-Nassr twice.

The two teams met twice earlier in the season with the first fixture ending in a draw and Al-Fayha winning the second fixture. This was the first meeting between these two sides in the King Cup and the 9th meeting between them in all competitions. In the clubs' 8 previous meetings, Al-Hilal won 4, Al-Fayha won 2 and the remaining 2 were drawn.

== Road to the final ==
Note: In all results below, the score of the finalist is given first (H: home; A: away).

Al-Fayha		Round	Al-Hilal
Opponent	Result	2021–22 King Cup	Opponent	Result
Abha (H)	4–0	Round of 16	Al-Raed (H)	2–0
Al-Batin (A)	2–1 (a.e.t.)	Quarter-finals	Al-Nassr (A)	2–1
Al-Ittihad (H)	1–0	Semi-finals	Al-Shabab (H)	2–1 (a.e.t.)

== Match ==
=== Details ===
19 May 2022
21:30 AST

Al-Fayha	1–1 (a.e.t.)	Al-Hilal
Lopes 66'	Report	S. Al-Dawsari 45+4'
Penalties
Ryller (penalty missed); Lopes (penalty scored); Al-Zaqaan (penalty scored); Al-Shuwaish (penalty missed); Tachtsidis (penalty scored)	3–1	(penalty missed) Ighalo; (penalty missed) Al-Faraj; (penalty missed) Al-Hamdan; (penalty scored) Al-Juwayr

King Abdullah Sports City, Jeddah
Attendance: 46,533
Referee: Antonio Mateu Lahoz (Spain)

**Al-Fayha**	**Al-Hilal**

GK	88	(Serbia) Vladimir Stojković	(yellow card) 90+4'
RB	22	(Saudi Arabia) Mohammed Al-Baqawi		(substituted off) 74'
CB	4	(Saudi Arabia) Sami Al-Khaibari (c)
CB	33	(Saudi Arabia) Hussein Al-Shuwaish	(yellow card) 120+1'
LB	24	(Saudi Arabia) Ahmed Bamsaud		(substituted off) 82'
CM	8	(Saudi Arabia) Abdulrahman Al-Safri		(substituted off) 62'
CM	37	(Brazil) Ricardo Ryller
CM	66	(Saudi Arabia) Mohammed Abousaban		(substituted off) 105'
RF	27	(Saudi Arabia) Sultan Mandash		(substituted off) 62'
CF	92	(North Macedonia) Aleksandar Trajkovski		(substituted off) 105'
LF	77	(Greece) Panagiotis Tachtsidis
Substitutes:
GK	1	(Saudi Arabia) Moslem Al Freej
DF	3	(Saudi Arabia) Bander Nasser		(substituted on) 82'
MF	6	(Saudi Arabia) Yousef Al-Harbi		(substituted on) 105'
MF	16	(Saudi Arabia) Ali Al-Nemer
MF	20	(Niger) Amadou Moutari		(substituted on) 74'
MF	25	(Saudi Arabia) Ali Al-Zaqaan		(substituted on) 62'
MF	26	(Saudi Arabia) Fawaz Al-Torais		(substituted on) 105'
MF	81	(Saudi Arabia) Ibrahim Al-Barakah
FW	7	(Brazil) Ramon Lopes		(substituted on) 62'
Manager:
(Serbia) Vuk Rašović

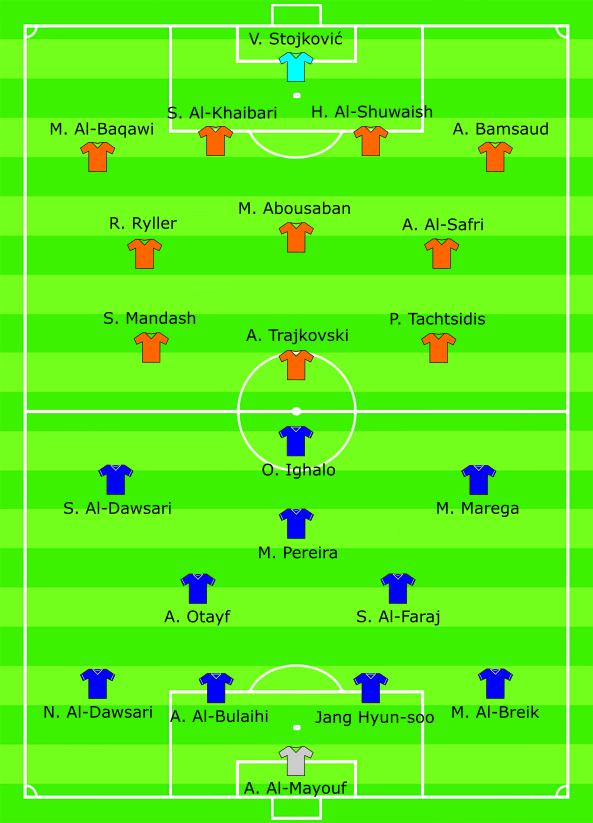

GK	1	(Saudi Arabia) Abdullah Al-Mayouf
RB	2	(Saudi Arabia) Mohammed Al-Breik		(substituted off) 75'
CB	20	(South Korea) Jang Hyun-soo
CB	5	(Saudi Arabia) Ali Al-Bulaihi
LB	16	(Saudi Arabia) Nasser Al-Dawsari		(substituted off) 104'
CM	15	(Brazil) Matheus Pereira		(substituted off) 75'
CM	8	(Saudi Arabia) Abdullah Otayf		(substituted off) 56'
CM	7	(Saudi Arabia) Salman Al-Faraj (c)	(yellow card) 105'
RF	17	(Mali) Moussa Marega		(substituted off) 99'
CF	9	(Nigeria) Odion Ighalo
LF	29	(Saudi Arabia) Salem Al-Dawsari	(yellow card) 37'
Substitutes:
GK	21	(Saudi Arabia) Mohammed Al-Owais
DF	13	(Saudi Arabia) Abdulrahman Al-Obaid
DF	66	(Saudi Arabia) Saud Abdulhamid		(substituted on) 75'
DF	67	(Saudi Arabia) Mohammed Al-Khaibari
DF	70	(Saudi Arabia) Mohammed Jahfali	(yellow card) 105'	(substituted on) 104'
DF	88	(Saudi Arabia) Hamad Al-Yami
MF	43	(Saudi Arabia) Musab Al-Juwayr		(substituted on) 56'
MF	96	(Brazil) Michael		(substituted on) 99'
FW	14	(Saudi Arabia) Abdullah Al-Hamdan		(substituted on) 75'
Manager:
(Argentina) Ramón Díaz

Assistant referees:
Pau Cebrián Devís (Spain)
Iker de Francisco Grijalba (Spain)
Fourth official:
Mohammed Al-Hoaish
Video assistant referee:
Ricardo de Burgos (Spain)
Assistant video assistant referee:
Abdulraheem Al-Shammari

**Match rules**

- 90 minutes
- 30 minutes of extra time if necessary
- Penalty shoot-out if scores still level
- Nine named substitutes
- Maximum of five substitutions, with a sixth allowed in extra time.

=== Statistics ===
First half
Statistic	Al-Fayha	Al-Hilal
Goals scored	0	1
Total shots	4	9
Shots on target	2	3
Saves	1	2
Ball possession	22%	78%
Corner kicks	3	3
Offsides	0	0
Yellow cards	0	1
Red cards	0	0

Second half
Statistic	Al-Fayha	Al-Hilal
Goals scored	1	0
Total shots	5	6
Shots on target	2	1
Saves	1	1
Ball possession	32%	68%
Corner kicks	3	3
Offsides	1	0
Yellow cards	1	0
Red cards	0	0

Extra time
Statistic	Al-Fayha	Al-Hilal
Goals scored	0	0
Total shots	1	5
Shots on target	0	2
Saves	2	0
Ball possession	23%	77%
Corner kicks	0	3
Offsides	0	0
Yellow cards	1	2
Red cards	0	0

Overall
Statistic	Al-Fayha	Al-Hilal
Goals scored	1	1
Total shots	10	20
Shots on target	4	6
Saves	4	3
Ball possession	26%	74%
Corner kicks	6	9
Fouls committed	14	12
Offsides	1	0
Yellow cards	2	3
Red cards	0	0

== See also ==
- 2021–22 King Cup
- 2021–22 Saudi Professional League
- 2022 Saudi Super Cup
