= 2019 King Cup final =

- Event: 2019 King Cup
Al-Ittihad	Al-Taawoun
1	2
- Date: 2 May 2019
- Venue: King Fahd International Stadium, Riyadh
- Referee: Néstor Pitana (Argentina)
- Attendance: 58,223
- Weather: Partly cloudy 32 °C (90 °F); 14% humidity

The 2019 King Cup final was the 44th final of the King Cup, Saudi Arabia's main football knock-out competition.

It took place on 2 May 2019 at the King Fahd International Stadium in Riyadh, Saudi Arabia and was contested between Al-Ittihad and Al-Taawoun. It was Al-Taawoun's second King Cup final and Al-Ittihad's 18th. This was the first-ever meeting between these two clubs in the final.

Al-Taawoun won the game 2–1 to secure their first title. As winners of the 2019 King Cup, Al-Taawoun qualified for the 2020 AFC Champions League group stage and the 2019 Saudi Super Cup.

== Teams ==
Team	Previous finals appearances (bold indicates winners)
Al-Ittihad	17 (1957, **1958**, **1959**, **1960**, **1963**, 1964, **1967**, 1979, 1982, 1986, **1988**, 2008, 2009, **2010**, 2011, **2013**, **2018**)
Al-Taawoun	1 (1990)

== Venue ==
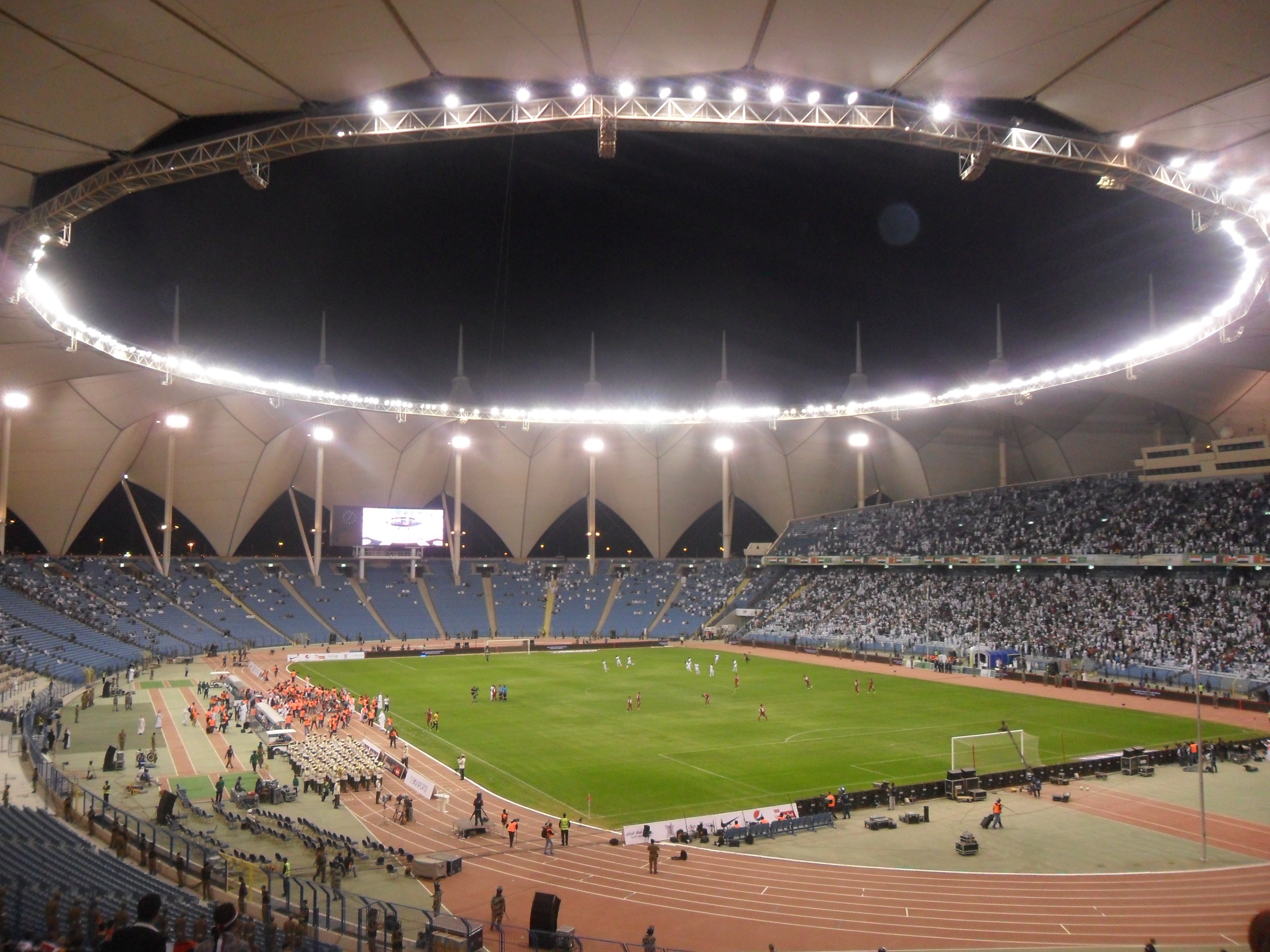
The King Fahd International Stadium in Riyadh hosted the final

The King Fahd International Stadium was announced as the final venue on 30 April 2019. This was the sixth King Cup final hosted in the King Fahd International Stadium following those in 1988, 2008, 2009, 2010, and 2013.

The King Fahd International Stadium was built in 1982 and was opened in 1987. The stadium was used as a venue for the 1992, 1995, and the 1997 editions of the FIFA Confederations Cup. Its current capacity is 68,752 and it is used by the Saudi Arabia national football team, Al-Nassr, Al-Shabab, and major domestic matches.

== Background ==
Defending champions Al-Ittihad reached a record 18th final after a 4–2 win against Pro League champions Al-Nassr, beating them for the second time in a week. This was Al-Ittihad's second consecutive final, and sixth final since the tournament was reintroduced.

Al-Taawoun reached their second final, after a historic 5–0 away win against Al-Hilal. They finished as runners-up in their previous final appearance, losing to Al-Nassr. This was Al-Taawoun's first appearance in the final as a top-tier side, as they were a second-tier side in 1990.

The two teams met twice in the Pro League, with Al-Taawoun winning the first match 5–3 in Buraidah. The second match ended in a 0–0 draw in Jeddah. This was the first meeting between the two sides in the King Cup.

== Road to the final ==
Note: In all results below, the score of the finalist is given first (H: home; A: away).

Al-Ittihad		Round	Al-Taawoun
Opponent	Result	2019 King Cup	Opponent	Result
Al-Jubail (A)	3–1 (a.e.t.)	Round of 64	Al-Adalah (H)	1–0
Al-Washm (A)	2–1	Round of 32	Al-Nahda (H)	6–0
Al-Taqadom (A)	3–0	Round of 16	Al-Shabab (H)	3–0
Al-Batin (H)	4–3	Quarter-finals	Al-Wehda (H)	3–0
Al-Nassr (H)	4–2 (a.e.t.)	Semi-finals	Al-Hilal (A)	5–0

== Match ==
=== Details ===
2 May 2019
20:45 AST

Al-Ittihad	1–2	Al-Taawoun
Prijović 32'	Report	Al-Absi 55'; Tawamba 90'

King Fahd International Stadium, Riyadh
Attendance: 58,223
Referee: Néstor Pitana (Argentina)

**Al-Ittihad**	**Al-Taawoun**

GK	22	(Saudi Arabia) Fawaz Al-Qarni
RB	66	(Saudi Arabia) Saud Abdulhamid
CB	17	(Morocco) Manuel da Costa
CB	13	(Saudi Arabia) Ahmed Assiri (c)
LB	2	(Saudi Arabia) Abdullah Al-Ammar
CM	20	(Morocco) Karim El Ahmadi	(yellow card) 71'
CM	35	(Ivory Coast) Sékou Sanogo
RW	8	(Saudi Arabia) Fahad Al-Muwallad
AM	10	(Chile) Carlos Villanueva
LW	23	(Cape Verde) Garry Rodrigues		(substituted off) 64'
CF	99	(Serbia) Aleksandar Prijović
Substitutes:
GK	12	(Saudi Arabia) Assaf Al-Qarni
DF	21	(Saudi Arabia) Mohammed Reeman
DF	30	(Saudi Arabia) Awn Al-Saloli
MF	6	(Saudi Arabia) Khaled Al-Sumairi
MF	7	(Saudi Arabia) Jaber Mustafa
MF	15	(Saudi Arabia) Jamal Bajandouh
MF	77	(Saudi Arabia) Abdulaziz Al-Bishi
FW	9	(Brazil) Romarinho		(substituted on) 64'
FW	26	(Saudi Arabia) Abdulaziz Al-Aryani
Manager:
(Chile) José Luis Sierra

GK	1	(Brazil) Cássio
RB	18	(Saudi Arabia) Madallah Al-Olayan
CB	5	(Saudi Arabia) Talal Al-Absi (c)
CB	32	(Saudi Arabia) Muteb Al-Mufarrij
LB	13	(Saudi Arabia) Ibrahim Al-Zubaidi		(substituted off) 46'
RM	20	(Cape Verde) Héldon		(substituted off) 89'
CM	6	(Saudi Arabia) Ryan Al-Mousa	(yellow card) 60'
CM	55	(Brazil) Sandro Manoel	(yellow card) 76'
LM	8	(Brazil) Nildo Petrolina	(yellow card) 61'
CF	17	(Burundi) Cédric Amissi
CF	3	(Cameroon) Léandre Tawamba		(substituted off) 90+4'
Substitutes:
GK	23	(Saudi Arabia) Hussain Shae'an
DF	4	(Portugal) Ricardo Machado		(substituted on) 90+4'
DF	16	(Saudi Arabia) Naif Al-Mousa
MF	7	(Saudi Arabia) Rabee Sufyani		(substituted on) 89'
MF	10	(Syria) Jehad Al-Hussain		(substituted on) 46'
MF	11	(Saudi Arabia) Nasser Al-Daajani
MF	19	(Saudi Arabia) Ibrahim Al-Otaybi
FW	9	(Saudi Arabia) Abdulfattah Adam
FW	25	(Saudi Arabia) Mansour Al-Muwallad
Manager:
(Portugal) Pedro Emanuel

Assistant referees:
Hernán Maidana (Argentina)
Juan Pablo Belatti (Argentina)
Fourth official:
Fernando Echenique (Argentina)
Video assistant referee:
Anderson Daronco (Brazil)

**Match rules**

- 90 minutes.
- 30 minutes of extra time if necessary.
- Penalty shoot-out if scores still level.
- Nine named substitutes.
- Maximum of three substitutions, with a fourth allowed in extra time.

=== Statistics ===
First half
Statistic	Al-Ittihad	Al-Taawoun
Goals scored	1	0
Total shots	2	10
Shots on target	1	5
Saves	5	0
Ball possession	51%	49%
Corner kicks	1	2
Fouls committed	7	8
Offsides	2	0
Yellow cards	0	0
Red cards	0	0

Second half
Statistic	Al-Ittihad	Al-Taawoun
Goals scored	0	2
Total shots	4	11
Shots on target	1	5
Saves	3	1
Ball possession	45%	55%
Corner kicks	1	5
Fouls committed	8	6
Offsides	1	0
Yellow cards	1	3
Red cards	0	0

Overall
Statistic	Al-Ittihad	Al-Taawoun
Goals scored	1	2
Total shots	6	21
Shots on target	2	10
Saves	8	1
Ball possession	48%	52%
Corner kicks	2	7
Fouls committed	15	14
Offsides	3	0
Yellow cards	1	3
Red cards	0	0

== See also ==
- 2019 King Cup
- 2018–19 Saudi Professional League
- 2019 Saudi Super Cup
