= Mohaisen Al-Jam'an =

Saudi Arabian footballer

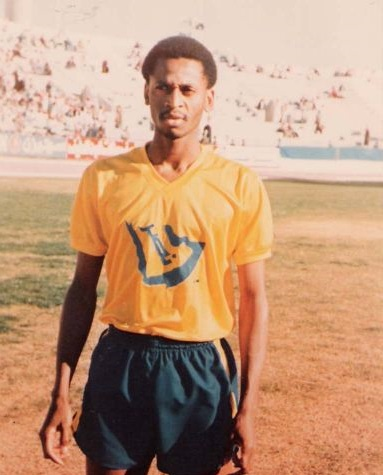

Personal information
- Full name: Mohaisen Mubarak Al-Jam'an Al-Dosari
- Date of birth: 6 April 1966 (age 60)
- Place of birth: Riyadh, Saudi Arabia
- Height: 1.75 m (5 ft 9 in)
- Position: Left wing

Youth career
- 1980–1984: Al-Nassr

Senior career*
Years	Team	Apps	(Gls)
1984–2000	Al-Nassr	136	(94)

International career
1984–1994	Saudi Arabia	106	(23)
Medal record
Representing Saudi Arabia
Men's football
AFC Asian Cup
Winner	1984 Singapore
Winner	1988 Qatar
- * Club domestic league appearances and goals

Mohaisen Mubarak Al-Jam'an Al-Dosari (Arabic: مُحَيْسِن مُبَارَك الْجَمْعَان الدَّوْسَرِيّ; born 6 April 1966) is a Saudi former football (soccer) player. He represented the Saudi national team from 1984 to 1994. He played as a striker.

== Career ==
Al-Jam'an competed in the 1984 Summer Olympics.

In 1998 winning Asia's super cup entitled Al-Nassr to play in the inaugural 2000 FIFA Club World Championship held in Brazil. Mohaisen played in all three matches, against Real Madrid of Spain (lost 1–3), Corinthians of Brazil (lost 0–2) and Raja of Morocco (won 4–3).

He is Al-Nassr 5th All–time top goalscorer with 110 goals in All competitions.

Al-Jam'an is Nicknamed the Cobra

== International goals ==
No.	Date	Venue	Opponent	Score	Result	Competition
1.	11 December 1984	National Stadium, Kallang, Singapore	Kuwait	1–0	1–0	1984 AFC Asian Cup

== Honours ==
Al-Nassr

- GCC Club Championship: 1996, 1997
- Asian Cup Winners' Cup: 1997–98
- Asian Super Cup: 1998
- King's Cup: 1986, 1987, 1990
- Prince Faisal Cup: 1997–98
- Saudi Premier League: 1988–89 [1993-1994] [1994-1995]

Saudi Arabia

- AFC Asian Cup: 1984, 1988
