= 1983 King Cup =

Tournament details
- Country: Saudi Arabia
- Dates: 14 April – 13 May 1983
- Teams: 32

Final positions
- Champions: Al-Ahli (10th title)
- Runners-up: Al-Ettifaq

Tournament statistics
- Matches played: 31
- Goals scored: 103 (3.32 per match)
- Top goal scorer: Amin Dabo (8 goals)

The 1983 King Cup was the 25th season of the knockout competition since its establishment in 1956. Al-Hilal were the defending champions, but they were eliminated by Al-Ahli in the semi-finals.

Al-Ahli defeated Al-Ettifaq in the final to win their 10th title.

== Bracket ==
Round of 32
A	Al-Tuhami	1
H	Damac	0
A	Al-Majd	0
H	Al-Ettifaq	4
A	Okaz	0
H	Ohod	6
A	Al-Taawoun	0
H	Al-Jeel	1
H	Al-Wehda	2
A	Al-Shabab	1
A	Al-Suqoor	0
H	Al-Diriyah	1
A	Al-Nahda	2
H	Al-Kawkab	1
A	Al-Ittihad	3
H	Al-Tai	1
H	Al-Samrah	0
A	Al-Rawdhah	2
H	Al-Orobah	0
A	Al-Qadsiah	2
A	Al-Fara'a	0
H	Al-Hilal	2
A	Al-Riyadh	5
H	Al-Noor	1
A	Al-Ahli	3
H	Al-Khaleej	2
H	Modhar	1
A	Wej	0
A	Al-Ansar	3
H	Al-Raed	1
H	Al-Nassr	3
A	Al-Jabalain	1

Round of 16
H	Al-Tuhami	1
A	Al-Ettifaq	3
A	Ohod (pen.)	2 (4)
H	Al-Jeel	2 (3)
A	Al-Wehda	0
H	Al-Diriyah	1
H	Al-Nahda	0
A	Al-Ittihad	1
A	Al-Rawdhah	3
H	Al-Qadsiah (a.e.t.)	4
H	Al-Hilal (a.e.t.)	2
A	Al-Riyadh	1
A	Al-Ahli	7
H	Modhar	0
H	Al-Ansar	0
A	Al-Nassr	1

Quarter-finals
H	Al-Ettifaq	2
A	Ohod	1
H	Al-Diriyah	0
A	Al-Ittihad	5
A	Al-Qadsiah	1
H	Al-Hilal	4
A	Al-Ahli	4
H	Al-Nassr	1

Semi-finals
H	Al-Ettifaq (a.e.t.)	2
A	Al-Ittihad	1
A	Al-Hilal	1
H	Al-Ahli	3

Final
–	Al-Ettifaq	0
–	Al-Ahli	1

Source: Al-Jazirah

== Round of 32 ==
The matches of the Round of 32 were played on 14 and 15 April 1983.

Home team	Score	Away team
Al-Ettifaq	4–0	Al-Majd
Ohod	6–0	Okaz
Al-Jeel	1–0	Al-Taawoun
Al-Diriyah	1–0	Al-Suqoor
Al-Kawkab	1–2	Al-Nahda
Al-Samrah	0–2	Al-Rawdhah
Al-Orobah	0–2	Al-Qadsiah
Modhar	1–0	Wej
Al-Nassr	3–1	Al-Jabalain
Damac	0–1	Al-Tuhami
Al-Wehda	2–1	Al-Shabab
Al-Tai	1–3	Al-Ittihad
Al-Hilal	2–0	Al-Fara'a
Al-Noor	1–5	Al-Riyadh
Al-Khaleej	2–3	Al-Ahli
Al-Raed	1–3	Al-Ansar

== Round of 16 ==
The Round of 16 matches were held on 21 and 22 April 1983.

Home team	Score	Away team
Al-Tuhami	1–3	Al-Ettifaq
Al-Jeel	2–2 (3–4 pen.)	Ohod
Al-Diriyah	1–0	Al-Wehda
Al-Nahda	0–1	Al-Ittihad
Al-Ansar	0–1	Al-Nassr
Al-Qadsiah	4–3 (aet)	Al-Rawdhah
Al-Hilal	2–1 (aet)	Al-Riyadh
Modhar	0–7	Al-Ahli

== Quarter-finals ==
The Quarter-final matches were held on 28 and 29 April 1983.

Home team	Score	Away team
Al-Diriyah	0–5	Al-Ittihad
Al-Hilal	4–1	Al-Qadsiah
Al-Ettifaq	2–1	Ohod
Al-Nassr	1–4	Al-Ahli

== Semi-finals ==
The four winners of the quarter-finals progressed to the semi-finals. The semi-finals were played on 5 and 6 May 1983. All times are local, AST (UTC+3).

5 May 1983
16:30

Al-Ettifaq	2–1 (a.e.t.)	Al-Ittihad
Khalifa 4'; Bakhashwain 105'	Report	Sobhi 1'

Khobar Sports Center Stadium, Khobar
Referee: Mohammed Al-Shareef
6 May 1983
16:30

Al-Ahli	3–1	Al-Hilal
H. Abo Dawood 17', 47'; Dabo 73'	Report	Al-Jarbo'o 20'

Youth Welfare Stadium in Jeddah, Jeddah
Referee: Fallaj Al-Shanar

== Final ==
The final was played between Al-Ettifaq and Al-Ahli in the Youth Welfare Stadium in Riyadh. Al-Ahli were appearing in their 12th final while Al-Ettifaq were appearing in their fourth the final. This final was a repeat of the 1965 final which ended in a win for Al-Ahli.

13 May 1983
15:50 (UTC+3)

Al-Ettifaq	0–1	Al-Ahli
	Report	Al-Sagheer 46' (pen.); Dabo (red card) 53'

Youth Welfare Stadium in Al-Malaz, Riyadh
Referee: Abdulrahman Al-Maatham

== Top goalscorers ==
Rank	Player	Club	Goals
1	(Saudi Arabia) Amin Dabo	Al-Ahli	8
2	(Saudi Arabia) Jamal Farhan	Al-Ittihad	4
2	(Saudi Arabia) Jamal Mohammed	Al-Ettifaq	4
2	(Saudi Arabia) Hussam Abu Dawood	Al-Ahli	4
2	(Saudi Arabia) Nasser Sodoos	Al-Riyadh	4
