= 1988 King Cup =

Tournament details
- Country: Saudi Arabia
- Dates: 30 March – 15 April 1988
- Teams: 14

Final positions
- Champions: Al-Ittihad (6th title)
- Runners-up: Al-Ettifaq
- Arab Cup Winners' Cup: Al-Ittihad

Tournament statistics
- Matches played: 13
- Goals scored: 33 (2.54 per match)
- Top goal scorer: Saleh Al-Najrani (4 goals)

The 1988 King Cup was the 30th season of the knockout competition since its establishment in 1956. Al-Nassr were the defending champions but they were eliminated by eventual champions Al-Ittihad in the semi-finals.

Al-Ittihad won their 6th title after defeating Al-Ettifaq 1–0 in the final. This was the first final to be held in the King Fahd International Stadium. As winners of the tournament, Al-Ittihad qualified for the 1989 Arab Cup Winners' Cup.

== Round of 16 ==
Both Al-Ettifaq and Ohod received a bye to the next round. Al-Ettifaq received due to their participation in the 1988 Gulf Club Champions Cup. Ohod received a bye to the lack of teams participating in this round. The matches of the Round of 16 were held on 31 March and 1 April 1988.

Home team	Score	Away team
Al-Ettifaq	Bye	
Ohod	Bye	
Al-Ahli	3–3 (2–3 pen.)	Al-Riyadh
Al-Ittihad	1–0	Al-Qadsiah
Al-Tai	0–1	Al-Nahda
Al-Kawkab	0–2	Al-Wehda
Al-Tuhami	2–2 (3–4 pen.)	Al-Shabab
Al-Nassr	1–0	Al-Hilal

== Quarter-finals ==
The matches of the Quarter-finals were held on 7 and 8 April 1988.

Home team	Score	Away team
Al-Nassr	4–0	Ohod
Al-Riyadh	1–3	Al-Shabab
Al-Ettifaq	1–0 (aet)	Al-Wehda
Al-Nahda	0–4	Al-Ittihad

== Semi-finals ==
The four winners of the quarter-finals progressed to the semi-finals. The semi-finals were played on 12 April 1988. All times are local, AST (UTC+3).

12 April 1988
16:30

Al-Shabab	0–2	Al-Ettifaq
	Report	Omar 30'; Hamood 89'

Youth Welfare Stadium in Al-Malaz, Riyadh
Referee: Mohammed Al-Shareef
12 April 1988
20:30

Al-Nassr	1–1 (a.e.t.)	Al-Ittihad
Al-Bishi 71'	Report	Al-Suwaiyed 40'
Penalties
Abdullah (penalty missed); Al-Jam'an (penalty missed); Al-Metlaq (penalty scored)	1–4	(penalty scored) Al-Suwaiyed; (penalty scored) Jamil; (penalty scored) Al-Muwallad; (penalty scored) Fareej

Youth Welfare Stadium in Al-Malaz, Riyadh
Referee: Omer Al Mehannah

== Final ==
The final was played between Al-Ittihad and Al-Ettifaq in the King Fahd Stadium in Riyadh. Al-Ittihad were appearing in their 11th final while Al-Ettifaq were making their 6th appearance.

15 April 1988
15:40 (UTC+3)

Al-Ittihad	1–0	Al-Ettifaq
Jamil 29'	Report

King Fahd International Stadium, Riyadh
Referee: Omar Al-Shaqeer

== Top goalscorers ==
Rank	Player	Club	Goals
1	(Saudi Arabia) Saleh Al-Najrani	Al-Riyadh	4
2	(Saudi Arabia) Bassem Abu Dawood	Al-Ahli	2
2	(Saudi Arabia) Majed Abdullah	Al-Nassr	2
2	(Saudi Arabia) Salah Al-Muwallad	Al-Ittihad	2
2	(Saudi Arabia) Mohamed Al-Suwaiyed	Al-Ittihad	2
