= 1979 King Cup =

Tournament details
- Country: Saudi Arabia
- Dates: 9 May – 8 June 1979
- Teams: 32

Final positions
- Champions: Al-Ahli (9th title)
- Runners-up: Al-Ittihad

Tournament statistics
- Matches played: 31
- Goals scored: 151 (4.87 per match)
- Top goal scorer: Amin Dabo (10 goals)

The 1979 King Cup was the 21st season of the knockout competition since its establishment in 1956. Al-Ahli were the defending champions and successfully defended the title, winning their third one in a row.

== Round of 32 ==
The matches of the Round of 32 were held on 9, 10 and 11 May 1979.

| Home team | Score | Away team |
|---|---|---|
| Al-Nassr | 7–2 | Al-Fara'a |
| Al-Ittihad | 2–0 | Okaz |
| Al-Khaleej | 2–1 | Al-Fateh |
| Al-Sharq | 0–2 | Al-Taawoun |
| Al-Qadsiah | 12–1 | Al-Watan |
| Al-Anwar | 1–4 | Al-Tai |
| Al-Rabi'e | 3–1 | Al-Najmah |
| Al-Riyadh | 7–1 | Al-Orobah |
| Al-Salam | 3–0 | Al-Ansar |
| Al-Wehda | 3–0 | Al-Raed |
| Al-Nakhil | 1–0 | Al-Hazem |
| Al-Rawdhah | 3–1 (a.e.t.) | Ohod |
| Al-Shabab | 4–1 | Al-Nahda |
| Al-Hilal | 8–1 | Al-Jabalain |
| Al-Ettifaq | 5–0 | Hajer |
| Al-Ahli | 10–1 | Al-Wadea |

== Round of 16 ==
The Round of 16 matches were held on 16, 17 and 18 May 1979.

| Home team | Score | Away team |
|---|---|---|
| Al-Rabi'e | 3–1 | Al-Tai |
| Al-Riyadh | 5–1 | Al-Salam |
| Al-Wehda | 0–1 | Al-Khaleej |
| Al-Ettifaq | 1–0 | Al-Taawoun |
| Al-Rawdhah | 3–1 | Al-Nakhil |
| Al-Qadsiah | 1–3 | Al-Nassr |
| Al-Hilal | 2–2 (8–9 pen.) | Al-Ittihad |
| Al-Ahli | 1–0 | Al-Shabab |

== Quarter-finals ==
The Quarter-final matches were held on 23, 24 and 25 May 1979.

| Home team | Score | Away team |
|---|---|---|
| Al-Nassr | 14–0 | Al-Rabi'e |
| Al-Ittihad | 3–0 | Al-Riyadh |
| Al-Ettifaq | 7–0 | Al-Khaleej |
| Al-Ahli | 6–1 | Al-Rawdhah |

== Semi-finals ==
The four winners of the quarter-finals progressed to the semi-finals. The semi-finals were played on 31 May and 1 June 1979. All times are local, AST (UTC+3).

31 May 1979
15:25

| Al-Nassr | 0–1 | Al-Ittihad |
|---|---|---|
| | Report | Al-Shamrani 20' |

Youth Welfare Stadium in Al-Malaz, Riyadh
Referee: Mohammed Al-Marzooq
1 June 1979
20:00

| Al-Ahli | 2–1 | Al-Ettifaq |
|---|---|---|
| Dabo 3', 33' | Report | Yaaqoub 27' |

Youth Welfare Stadium in Jeddah, Jeddah
Referee: Al-Zameel Al-Dahmash

== Final ==
The final was played between Al-Ahli and Al-Ittihad in the Youth Welfare Stadium in Riyadh. This was the first final to be played by two teams from the same city. Al-Ahli were appearing in their 11th final while Al-Ittihad were appearing in their 8th final.

8 June 1979
20:30 (UTC+3)

| Al-Ahli | 4–0 | Al-Ittihad |
|---|---|---|
| Muraiki 43'; Dabo 55', 70'; Dhiab 73' | Report |

Youth Welfare Stadium in Al-Malaz, Riyadh
Attendance: 28,000
Referee: Fallaj Al-Shanar

== Top goalscorers ==
| Rank | Player | Club | Goals |
|---|---|---|---|
| 1 | (Saudi Arabia) Amin Dabo | Al-Ahli | 10 |
| 2 | (Saudi Arabia) Majed Abdullah | Al-Nassr | 6 |
| 3 | (Saudi Arabia) Fareed Al-Moaidi | Al-Qadsiah | 5 |
| 3 | (Saudi Arabia) Saleh Khalifa Al-Dosari | Al-Ettifaq | 5 |
| 5 | (Tunisia) Néjib Limam | Al-Hilal | 4 |
| 6 | (Saudi Arabia) Sultan Bin Nasseb | Al-Hilal | 3 |
| 6 | (Brazil) Rivellino | Al-Hilal | 3 |
