= 1980 King Cup =

Tournament details
- Country: Saudi Arabia
- Dates: 12 April – 2 May 1980
- Teams: 32

Final positions
- Champions: Al-Hilal (3rd title)
- Runners-up: Al-Shabab

Tournament statistics
- Matches played: 31
- Top goal scorer(s): Naif Marzooq; Néjib Limam; Rivellino (5 goals)

The 1980 King Cup was the 22nd season of the knockout competition since its establishment in 1956. Al-Ahli were the defending champions but were eliminated by Ohod in the Round of 32. Al-Hilal defeated city rivals Al-Shabab to win their 3rd title and first since 1964.

== Round of 32 ==
The matches of the Round of 32 were held on 12, 13 and 14 April 1980.

Home team	Score	Away team
Al-Noor	3–1	Al-Anwar
Al-Riyadh	4–1	Al-Thoqbah
Al-Ansar	1–2 (aet)	Al-Shabab
Al-Jabalain	0–2	Al-Ettifaq
Al-Kawkab	3–2 (aet)	Al-Raed
Al-Khaleej	N/A	Al-Rabe'e
Al-Faisaly	3–2 (aet)	Al-Taqadom
Al-Ittihad	1–0	Al-Nahda
Al-Hilal	2–0	Al-Taawoun
Ohod	1–0	Al-Ahli
Al-Tai	1–3	Al-Nassr
Al-Qadsiah	5–2	Okaz
Al-Rawdhah	1–0 (aet)	Hajer
Al-Qala	1–0	Al-Watan
Al-Wehda	4–0	Al-Nojoom
Al-Washm	N/A (N/A pen.)	Damac

== Round of 16 ==
The Round of 16 matches were held on 17 and 18 April 1980.

Home team	Score	Away team
Al-Ittihad	1–0	Al-Nassr
Al-Shabab	4–0	Al-Ettifaq
Al-Kawkab	0–3	Al-Qadsiah
Al-Khaleej	4–3 (aet)	Al-Noor
Al-Hilal	4–1	Al-Wehda
Al-Riyadh	3–1	Damac
Al-Rawdhah	1–2	Al-Qala
Ohod	7–1	Al-Faisaly

== Quarter-finals ==
The Quarter-final matches were held on 21 and 22 April 1980.

Home team	Score	Away team
Al-Shabab	3–2	Al-Qadsiah
Al-Khaleej	1–2	Ohod
Al-Ittihad	9–0	Al-Qala
Al-Hilal	3–0	Al-Riyadh

== Semi-finals ==
The four winners of the quarter-finals progressed to the semi-finals. The semi-finals were played on 24 and 25 April 1980. All times are local, AST (UTC+3).

24 April 1980
16:00

Al-Shabab	3–0	Al-Ittihad
Marzooq 13', 42'; Al-Ma'ajil 84'	Report

Youth Welfare Stadium in Al-Malaz, Riyadh
Referee: Fallaj Al-Shanar
25 April 1980
16:00

Ohod	1–2	Al-Hilal
Omar	Report	Limam pen.',

Youth Welfare Stadium in Medina, Medina
Referee: Muthaib Al-Joaid

== Final ==
The final was played between Al-Hilal and Al-Shabab in the Youth Welfare Stadium in Riyadh. This was the second final to be played by two teams from the same city following the 1979 final. Al-Hilal were appearing in their 6th final while Al-Shabab were appearing in their 2nd final.

2 May 1980
20:30 (UTC+3)

Al-Hilal	3–1 (a.e.t.)	Al-Shabab
Al-Naseeb 46', 108'; Bruno 103' (o.g.)	Report	Bruno 18'

Youth Welfare Stadium in Al-Malaz, Riyadh
Referee: Abdulrahman Al-Mozan
