= 1976 King Cup =

Tournament details
- Country: Saudi Arabia
- Dates: 6 May – 4 June 1976
- Teams: 32

Final positions
- Champions: Al-Nassr (2nd title)
- Runners-up: Al-Ahli

Tournament statistics
- Matches played: 31
- Goals scored: 121 (3.9 per match)
- Top goal scorer(s): Saud Jassem (10 goals)

The 1976 King Cup was the 18th season of the knockout competition since its establishment in 1956.

Al-Nassr were the defending champions and successfully defended the title, winning their second one in a row. The final saw Al-Nassr beat Al-Ahli 2–0 at the Youth Welfare Stadium in Riyadh.

== Bracket ==
Round of 32
H	Al-Nassr	1
A	Hajer	0
A	Al-Maseera	2
H	Al-Qadsiah	16
A	Al-Kawkab	3
H	Al-Khaleej	1
H	Al-Fateh	3
A	Al-Shabab	2
H	Al-Riyadh	0 (5)
A	Al-Shoulla (pen.)	0 (6)
A	Al-Ettifaq	1
H	Al-Fayha	0
H	Al-Nahda	4
A	Al-Badna	0
A	Al-Taalof	0
H	Al-Hilal	10
H	Al-Ittihad	8
A	Al-Wadea	0
H	Al-Raed	1
A	Al-Arabi	0
A	Al-Jabalain	2
H	Al-Kholood	0
A	Al-Rabe'e	1
H	Al-Wehda	2
A	Okaz	2
H	Al-Najma	4
H	Ohod (pen.)	2 (5)
A	Al-Ansar	2 (3)
H	Al-Majd	0
A	Al-Suqoor	1
A	Al-Kefah	0
H	Al-Ahli	4

Round of 16
A	Al-Nassr	2
H	Al-Qadsiah	1
A	Al-Kawkab	1
H	Al-Fateh	2
H	Al-Shoulla	1 (4)
A	Al-Ettifaq (pen.)	1 (5)
H	Al-Nahda	0
A	Al-Hilal	4
A	Al-Ittihad	2
H	Al-Raed	0
H	Al-Jabalain	0
A	Al-Wehda	1
H	Al-Najma	0
A	Ohod	5
A	Al-Suqoor	1
H	Al-Ahli	9

Quarter-finals
H	Al-Nassr	3
A	Al-Fateh	0
A	Al-Ettifaq	0
H	Al-Hilal	1
A	Al-Ittihad	1
H	Al-Wehda	0
H	Ohod	2
A	Al-Ahli	5

Semi-finals
H	Al-Nassr (pen.)	0 (4)
A	Al-Hilal	0 (2)
A	Al-Ittihad	0
H	Al-Ahli	5

Final
–	Al-Nassr	2
–	Al-Ahli	0

Source: Al-Jazirah

== Round of 32 ==
The matches of the Round of 32 were held on 6, 7, 8, and 11 May 1976.

Home team	Score	Away team
Al-Nassr	1–0	Hajer
Al-Qadsiah	16–2	Al-Maseera
Ohod	2–2 (5–3 pen.)	Al-Ansar
Al-Khaleej	1–3	Al-Kawkab
Al-Fateh	3–2	Al-Shabab
Al-Nahda	4–0	Al-Badna
Al-Hilal	10–0	Al-Taalof
Al-Ittihad	8–0	Al-Wadea
Al-Raed	1–0	Al-Arabi
Al-Kholood	0–2	Al-Jabalain
Al-Wehda	2–1	Al-Rabe'e
Al-Najma	4–2	Okaz
Al-Majd	0–1	Al-Suqoor
Al-Ahli	4–0	Al-Kefah
Al-Riyadh	0–0 (5–6 pen.)	Al-Shoulla
Al-Fayha	0–1	Al-Ettifaq

== Round of 16 ==
The Round of 16 matches were held on 13 and 14 May 1976.

Home team	Score	Away team
Al-Qadsiah	1–2	Al-Nassr
Al-Fateh	2–1	Al-Kawkab
Al-Jabalain	0–1	Al-Wehda
Al-Shoulla	1–1 (4–5 pen.)	Al-Ettifaq
Al-Nahda	0–4	Al-Hilal
Al-Raed	0–2	Al-Ittihad
Al-Najma	0–5	Ohod
Al-Ahli	9–1	Al-Suqoor

== Quarter-finals ==
The Quarter-final matches were held on 20 and 21 May 1976.

Home team	Score	Away team
Al-Nassr	3–0	Al-Fateh
Al-Hilal	1–0	Al-Ettifaq
Al-Wehda	0–1	Al-Ittihad
Ohod	2–5	Al-Ahli

== Semi-finals ==
The four winners of the quarter-finals progressed to the semi-finals. The semi-finals were played on 27 and 28 May 1976. All times are local, AST (UTC+3).

27 May 1976

Al-Ahli	5–0	Al-Ittihad
Kayal, Aidaroos, Ghurab	Report

Al-Sabban Stadium, Jeddah
Referee: Mohammed Al-Marzouq
28 May 1976

Al-Nassr	0–0 (a.e.t.)	Al-Hilal
	Report
Penalties
	4–2

Youth Welfare Stadium in Al-Malaz, Riyadh
Referee: Abdulrahman Al-Daham

== Final ==
The final was played between Al-Ahli and Al-Nassr in the Youth Welfare Stadium in Riyadh. This was Al-Ahli's 8th final. Previously Al-Ahli won six times in 1962, 1965, 1969, 1970, 1971, and 1973 and lost once in 1974 against Al-Nassr. This was Al-Nassr's 5th final. Previously Al-Nassr won once in 1974 and lost in 1967, 1971, and 1973. This was the fourth meeting between these two sides in the final. Al-Ahli won twice while Al-Nassr won once.

4 June 1976
15:30 (UTC+3)

Al-Nassr	2–0	Al-Ahli
Al-Abdali 35'; Al-Sadhan 82'	Report

Youth Welfare Stadium in Al-Malaz, Riyadh
Referee: Abdulrahman Al-Daham
