= 2008 King Cup of Champions =

Tournament details
- Country: Saudi Arabia
- Dates: April 18 – May 14 2008
- Teams: 8

Final positions
- Champions: Al-Shabab (1st title)
- Runners-up: Al-Ittihad

Tournament statistics
- Matches played: 14
- Goals scored: 52 (3.71 per match)
- Top goal scorer: Nasser Al-Shamrani (7 goals)

The 2008 King Cup of Champions was the 33rd edition of the King Cup of Champions.

The cup winner were guaranteed a place in the 2009 AFC Champions League. this was the first edition to be held since 1990.

== Participating teams ==
=== Level 1 ===
- Al-Hilal : Saudi Premier League and Crown Prince Cup champion
- Al-Ittihad : Saudi Premier League runner up
- Al-Nassr : Saudi Federation Cup Champion
- Al-Shabab : Saudi Premier League 3rd place

=== Level 2 ===
- Al-Ettifaq : Saudi Premier League 4th place
- Al-Wehda : Saudi Premier League 6th place
- Al-Hazem : Saudi Premier League 7th place
- Al-Ahli : Saudi Premier League 8th place

== Fixtures and results ==
=== Bracket ===
Quarter-finals
(Saudi Arabia)	Al-Nassr	2	1	3 (5)
(Saudi Arabia)	Al-Hazem	3	0	3 (6)
(Saudi Arabia)	Al-Ahli	1	1	2
(Saudi Arabia)	Al-Shabab	6	3	9
(Saudi Arabia)	Al-Hilal	0	2	2
(Saudi Arabia)	Al-Wehda	0	1	1
(Saudi Arabia)	Al-Ettifaq	1	1	2
(Saudi Arabia)	Al-Ittihad	1	5	6

Semi-finals
(Saudi Arabia)	Al-Hazem	4	0	4
(Saudi Arabia)	Al-Shabab	2	5	7
(Saudi Arabia)	Al-Hilal	1	1	2
(Saudi Arabia)	Al-Ittihad	4	2	6

Final
(Saudi Arabia)	Al-Shabab	3
(Saudi Arabia)	Al-Ittihad	1
