= Yousef Khamees (footballer, born 1961) =

Arabian football Forward

Personal information
- Full name: Yousef Rashed Khamees Aboloya
- Date of birth: 16 August 1961 (age 65)
- Place of birth: Riyadh, Saudi Arabia
- Height: 1.69 m (5 ft 7 in)
- Position: Forward

Senior career*
Years	Team	Apps	(Gls)
1977–1987	Al-Nassr		

International career
1978–1986	Saudi Arabia	50	(4)
- * Club domestic league appearances and goals

Yousef Rashed Khamees Aboloya is a Saudi football forward who played for Saudi Arabia in the 1984 Asian Cup.
