= Ahmed Jamil Madani =

Saudi Arabian footballer (born 1970)

Personal information
- Date of birth: 6 January 1970 (age 56)
- Place of birth: Jeddah, Saudi Arabia
- Height: 1.79 m (5 ft 10 in)
- Position: Defender

Youth career
- Al-Ittihad

Senior career*
Years	Team	Apps	(Gls)
1985–2000	Al-Ittihad		

International career^{‡}
1986–1998	Saudi Arabia	117	(5)
- * Club domestic league appearances and goals as of 21 April 2012 ‡ National team caps and goals as of 21 April 2012

Ahmed Jamil Madani (Arabic: أحمد جميل مدني) (born 6 January 1970) is a retired Saudi Arabian footballer. He played in a defensive role. Madani is recognized as one of the best Saudi defenders in country and he was included in the best eleven in history of Saudi Arabia by IFFHS.

== Career ==
A hardworking defender with good defensive skills. He was also characterized by physical attributes, in particular a high jumping ability.

Madani played his entire career for Al-Ittihad and also participated in many international tournaments. He helped to qualify for the 1994 FIFA World Cup. Madani was one of the key players during historical win against Belgium as well during the whole tournament. He was in the squad at the 1998 FIFA World Cup with the national team, but he didn't play a single game.

He also participated at the 1987 FIFA World Youth Championship and 1989 FIFA World Youth Championship.

== Honours ==
=== Al-Ittihad ===
Winner

- Saudi Premier League (3): 1996–97, 1998–99, 1999–2000
- Saudi King's Cup (1): 1988
- Crown Prince Cup (2): 1991, 1997
- Saudi Federation Cup (3): 1986, 1997, 1999
- GCC Club Cup (1): 1999
- Asian Cup Winners Cup (1): 1999

Runner-Up

- Saudi Premier League (1): 1985–86
- Saudi King's Cup (1): 1986
- Crown Prince Cup (1): 1993
- Saudi Federation cup (2): 1988, 1998
- Arab Champions League (2): 1987, 1994

=== Saudi Arabia ===
Winner

- Asian Cup (2): 1988, 1996
- Arabian Gulf Cup (1): 1994

Runner-Up

- Asian Cup (1): 1992

== See also ==
- List of men's footballers with 100 or more international caps
