= 1981 King Cup =

1981 King's Cup
Tournament details
- Country: Saudi Arabia
- Dates: 15 April – 14 May 1981
- Teams: 32

Final positions
- Champions: Al-Nassr (3rd title)
- Runners-up: Al-Hilal

Tournament statistics
- Matches played: 31
- Goals scored: 148 (4.77 per match)
- Top goal scorer(s): Toninho; Hamad Al-Jaye'e; Saud Jassem (5 goals each)

The 1981 King's Cup was the 23rd season of the knockout competition since its establishment in 1956. Al-Hilal were the defending champions but were defeated by Al-Nassr in the final. Al-Nassr won their 3rd title overall and first since 1976.

== Bracket ==
Round of 32
A | Al-Nahda (pen.) | 0 (4)
H | Al-Ansar | 0 (3)
H | Al-Ta'alof | 1
A | Al-Raed (a.e.t.) | 2
A | Al-Fateh | 1
H | Al-Ettifaq | 6
H | Al-Shoulla | 1
A | Al-Kawkab | 2
H | Al-Jabalain | 2
A | Al-Taawoun | 0
H | Al-Rabe'e | 0
A | Al-Qadsiah | 7
H | Al-Ahli | 4
A | Al-Tai | 1
H | Al-Nassr | 14
A | Al-Amal | 0
A | Al-Rawdhah | 4
H | Al-Khaleej | 2
A | Al-Nakhil | 2
H | Al-Shate'e (a.e.t.) | 5
H | Al-Ittihad | 5
A | Al-Arabi | 1
A | Al-Shabab | 4
H | Ohod | 2
A | Al-Watani | 0
H | Al-Riyadh | 7
A | Al-Faisaly | 3
H | Hajer | 1
H | Al-Hilal | 11
A | Al-Qala | 1
A | Al-Dera'a | 0
H | Al-Wehda | 12

Round of 16
H | Al-Nahda | 5
A | Al-Raed | 0
A | Al-Ettifaq (a.e.t.) | 3
H | Al-Kawkab | 1
A | Al-Jabalain | 0
H | Al-Qadsiah | 2
A | Al-Ahli | 0
H | Al-Nassr | 1
A | Al-Rawdhah | 2
H | Al-Shate'e | 1
H | Al-Ittihad | 1
A | Al-Shabab | 0
H | Al-Riyadh | 2
A | Al-Faisaly | 0
H | Al-Hilal | 3
A | Al-Wehda | 1

Quarter-finals
A | Al-Nahda | 1
H | Al-Ettifaq | 3
H | Al-Qadsiah | 1
A | Al-Nassr | 5
H | Al-Rawdhah | 1
A | Al-Ittihad | 2
H | Al-Riyadh | 0
A | Al-Hilal | 2

Semi-finals
H | Al-Ettifaq | 1
A | Al-Nassr (a.e.t.) | 2
H | Al-Ittihad | 1
A | Al-Hilal | 2

Final
– | Al-Nassr | 3
– | Al-Hilal | 1

Source: Al Jazirah

== Round of 32 ==
The matches of the Round of 32 were held on 15, 16 and 17 April 1981.

| Home team | Score | Away team |
|---|---|---|
| Al-Nassr | 14–0 | Al-Amal |
| Al-Ahli | 4–1 | Al-Tai |
| Al-Ettifaq | 6–1 | Al-Fateh |
| Al-Ta'alof | 1–2 (a.e.t.) | Al-Raed |
| Al-Shate'e | 5–2 (a.e.t.) | Al-Nakhil |
| Al-Ittihad | 5–1 | Al-Arabi |
| Ohod | 2–4 | Al-Shabab |
| Al-Riyadh | 7–0 | Al-Watani |
| Hajer | 1–3 | Al-Faisaly |
| Al-Wehda | 12–0 | Al-Dera'a |
| Al-Hilal | 11–1 | Al-Qala |
| Al-Ansar | 0–0 (3–4 pen.) | Al-Nahda |
| Al-Jabalain | 2–0 | Al-Taawoun |
| Al-Rabe'e | 0–7 | Al-Qadsiah |
| Al-Khaleej | 2–4 | Al-Rawdhah |
| Al-Shoulla | 1–2 | Al-Kawkab |

== Round of 16 ==
The Round of 16 matches were held on 22, 23 and 24 April 1981.

| Home team | Score | Away team |
|---|---|---|
| Al-Kawkab | 1–3 (a.e.t.) | Al-Ettifaq |
| Al-Nahda | 5–0 | Al-Raed |
| Al-Qadsiah | 2–0 | Al-Jabalain |
| Al-Ittihad | 1–0 | Al-Shabab |
| Al-Hilal | 3–1 | Al-Wehda |
| Al-Nassr | 1–0 | Al-Ahli |
| Al-Riyadh | 2–0 | Al-Faisaly |
| Al-Shate'e | 1–2 | Al-Rawdhah |

== Quarter-finals ==
The Quarter-final matches were held on 30 April and 1 May 1981.

| Home team | Score | Away team |
|---|---|---|
| Al-Rawdhah | 1–2 | Al-Ittihad |
| Al-Qadsiah | 1–5 | Al-Nassr |
| Al-Riyadh | 0–2 | Al-Hilal |
| Al-Ettifaq | 3–1 | Al-Nahda |

== Semi-finals ==
The four winners of the quarter-finals progressed to the semi-finals. The semi-finals were played on 7 and 8 May 1981. All times are local, AST (UTC+3).

7 May 1981
16:30

| Al-Ettifaq | 1–2 (a.e.t.) | Al-Nassr |
|---|---|---|
| Jorge 70' | Report | Al-Qassar 35' (o.g.); Abdullah 97' |

Youth Welfare Stadium in Dammam, Dammam
Referee: Muthaib Al-Joaid
8 May 1981
16:30

| Al-Ittihad | 1–2 | Al-Hilal |
|---|---|---|
| Beer 65' | Report | Al-Nu'eimeh 29'; Al-Hathlool 36' |

Youth Welfare Stadium in Jeddah, Jeddah
Referee: Abdullah Al-Mawzan

== Final ==
The final was played between Al-Nassr and Al-Hilal in the Youth Welfare Stadium in Riyadh. This was Al-Nassr's 6th final and Al-Hilal's 7th final. This was the first meeting between these sides in King Cup finals.

14 May 1981
15:30 (UTC+3)

| Al-Nassr | 3–1 | Al-Hilal |
|---|---|---|
| Khamees 24'; Abdullah 38'; Al-Yahya 68' | Report | Rivellino 63' |

Youth Welfare Stadium in Al-Malaz, Riyadh
Attendance: 20,000
Referee: Fahad Al-Dahmash

== Top goalscorers ==
| Rank | Player | Club | Goals |
|---|---|---|---|
| 1 | (Brazil) Toninho | Al-Nassr | 5 |
| 1 | (Saudi Arabia) Hamad Al-Jaye'e | Al-Rawdhah | 5 |
| 1 | (Saudi Arabia) Saud Jassem | Al-Qadsiah | 5 |
| 4 | (Saudi Arabia) Majed Abdullah | Al-Nassr | 4 |
| 4 | (Saudi Arabia) Yousef Khamees | Al-Nassr | 4 |
| 4 | (Tunisia) Néjib Limam | Al-Hilal | 4 |
| 4 | (Saudi Arabia) Jamal Mohammed | Al-Ettifaq | 4 |
