= Néjib Limam =

Tunisian footballer

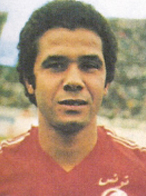

Personal information
- Date of birth: 12 June 1953 (age 73)
- Place of birth: Le Bardo, Tunisia
- Position: Forward

Senior career*
Years	Team	Apps	(Gls)
	Stade Tunisien		(67)
1978–1981	Al-Hilal FC		(28)

International career
1973–1981	Tunisia		(3)
- * Club domestic league appearances and goals

Néjib Limam (Arabic: نجيب الإمام) (born 12 June 1953) is a Tunisian former professional footballer who played as a forward during his club career and for the Tunisia national team. He appeared for Tunisia in the 1978 FIFA World Cup. He also played for Stade Tunisien.
