= 1986 King Cup =

Tournament details
- Country: Saudi Arabia
- Dates: 6 – 17 January 1986
- Teams: 16

Final positions
- Champions: Al-Nassr (4th title)
- Runners-up: Al-Ittihad

Tournament statistics
- Matches played: 15
- Goals scored: 42 (2.8 per match)
- Top goal scorer(s): Mohamed Al-Suwaiyed; Jamal Mohammed (3 goals)

The 1986 King Cup was the 28th season of the knockout competition since its establishment in 1956. Al-Ettifaq were the defending champions but they were eliminated by Al-Tai in the quarter-finals.

Al-Nassr won their 4th title after defeating Al-Ittihad 1–0 in the final. This was their first title since 1981.

== Bracket ==
Round of 16
H	Al-Ettifaq	4
A	Al-Arabi	0
A	Al-Tai	2
H	Al-Ahli	1
H	Al-Nassr	2
A	Al-Wehda	0
H	Al-Kawkab	1
A	Al-Riyadh	7
H	Al-Wadea	1
A	Al-Nahda	0
H	Al-Hilal	1 (4)
A	Al-Qadsiah (pen.)	1 (5)
H	Al-Ittihad (a.e.t.)	2
A	Al-Ansar	1
H	Al-Shoulla	1 (5)
A	Al-Shabab (pen.)	1 (6)

Quarter-finals
A	Al-Ettifaq	1
H	Al-Tai	2
A	Al-Nassr	3
H	Al-Riyadh	2
A	Al-Wadea	0
H	Al-Qadsiah	2
A	Al-Ittihad (pen.)	1 (4)
H	Al-Shabab	1 (2)

Semi-finals
A	Al-Tai	1
H	Al-Nassr	2
A	Al-Qadsiah	0
H	Al-Ittihad	1

Final
–	Al-Nassr	1
–	Al-Ittihad	0

Note: H: Home team, A: Away team

Source: Al Jazirah

== Round of 16 ==
The matches of the Round of 16 were held on 6 and 7 January 1986.

Home team	Score	Away team
Al-Ettifaq	4–0	Al-Arabi
Al-Kawkab	1–7	Al-Riyadh
Al-Nassr	2–0	Al-Wehda
Al-Wadea	1–0	Al-Nahda
Al-Ittihad	2–1 (aet)	Al-Ansar
Al-Ahli	1–2	Al-Tai
Al-Hilal	1–1 (4–5 pen.)	Al-Qadsiah
Al-Shoulla	1–1 (5–6 pen.)	Al-Shabab

== Quarter-finals ==
The Quarter-final matches were held on 10 January 1986.

Home team	Score	Away team
Al-Tai	2–1	Al-Ettifaq
Al-Riyadh	2–3	Al-Nassr
Al-Qadsiah	2–0	Al-Wadea
Al-Shabab	1–1 (2–4 pen.)	Al-Ittihad

== Semi-finals ==
The four winners of the quarter-finals progressed to the semi-finals. The semi-finals were played on 13 January 1986. All times are local, AST (UTC+3).

13 January 1986
16:00

Al-Nassr	2–1	Al-Tai
Al-Fahad 8'; Al-Bishi 46'	Report	Al-Sader

Youth Welfare Stadium in Al-Malaz, Riyadh
Referee: Hamad Al-Homaimadi
13 January 1986
20:00

Al-Ittihad	1–0	Al-Qadsiah
Ghurab 89'	Report

Youth Welfare Stadium in Jeddah, Jeddah
Referee: Fallaj Al-Shanar

== Final ==
The final was played between Al-Nassr and Al-Ittihad in the Youth Welfare Stadium in Al-Malaz, Riyadh. Al-Ittihad were appearing in their 10th while Al-Nassr were appearing in their 7th final.

17 January 1986
15:15 (UTC+3)

Al-Nassr	1–0	Al-Ittihad
Yousef Khamees 37'	Report

Youth Welfare Stadium in Al-Malaz, Riyadh
Attendance: 30,000
Referee: Abdullah Al-Nasser

== Top goalscorers ==
Rank	Player	Club	Goals
1	(Saudi Arabia) Mohamed Al-Suwaiyed	Al-Ittihad	3
1	(Saudi Arabia) Jamal Mohammed	Al-Ettifaq	3
3	(Saudi Arabia) Mohammed Al-Mutaraf	Al-Riyadh	2
3	(Saudi Arabia) Nasser Al-Hammad	Al-Tai	2
3	(Saudi Arabia) Nasser Al-Fahad	Al-Nassr	2
