= 1982 King Cup =

Tournament details
- Country: Saudi Arabia
- Dates: 11 April – 7 May 1982
- Teams: 32

Final positions
- Champions: Al-Hilal (4th title)
- Runners-up: Al-Ittihad

Tournament statistics
- Matches played: 31
- Goals scored: 81 (2.61 per match)
- Top goal scorer: Ahmed Mabrook (4 goals)

The 1982 King Cup was the 24th season of the knockout competition since its establishment in 1956. Al-Nassr were the defending champions but they were eliminated by Al-Shabab in the Round of 16.

Al-Hilal won their 4th title after defeating Al-Ittihad 3–1 in the final.

== Bracket ==
Round of 32
H	Al-Thoqbah	1
A	Al-Dera'a	0
A	Al-Lewaa	0
H	Okaz	1
H	Al-Jabalain	0
A	Al-Qadsiah	2
H	Al-Wehda	3
A	Al-Shoulla	0
H	Al-Nakhil	1
A	Al-Watani	0
H	Al-Ittihad	3
A	Al-Kefah	0
H	Al-Nahda	4
A	Al-Khaleej	3
H	Al-Ansar	1
A	Al-Ettifaq (a.e.t.)	3
A	Damac	0
H	Al-Oyoon	1
A	Al-Taawoun	2
H	Al-Majd	1
H	Al-Rawdhah	1
A	Al-Tai	0
H	Al-Riyadh	1
A	Al-Kawkab (a.e.t.)	2
A	Al-Taraji	3
H	Al-Orobah	2
H	Al-Ahli	0
A	Al-Hilal	2
H	Ohod	0
A	Al-Nassr	2
H	Al-Shabab	4
A	Al-Amal	0

Round of 16
H	Al-Thoqbah	1
A	Okaz	0
A	Al-Qadsiah	1
H	Al-Wehda	2
H	Al-Nakhil	0
A	Al-Ittihad	1
H	Al-Nahda	1
A	Al-Ettifaq	3
A	Al-Oyoon	0
H	Al-Taawoun	1
A	Al-Rawdhah	0
H	Al-Kawkab	1
A	Al-Taraji	0
H	Al-Hilal	4
A	Al-Nassr	0
H	Al-Shabab (a.e.t.)	1

Quarter-finals
A	Al-Thoqbah	0
H	Al-Wehda	3
H	Al-Ittihad	5
A	Al-Ettifaq	1
H	Al-Taawoun	1
A	Al-Kawkab	3
H	Al-Hilal (pen.)	1 (4)
A	Al-Shabab	1 (3)

Semi-finals
A	Al-Wehda	0
H	Al-Ittihad	1
A	Al-Kawkab	1
H	Al-Hilal	2

Final
–	Al-Ittihad	1
–	Al-Hilal	3

Source: Al-Jazirah

== Round of 32 ==
The matches of the Round of 32 were played on 11, 12 and 13 April 1982.

Home team	Score	Away team
Al-Majd	0–1	Al-Taawoun
Al-Jabalain	0–2	Al-Qadsiah
Al-Rawdhah	1–0	Al-Tai
Al-Riyadh	1–2 (aet)	Al-Kawkab
Al-Thoqbah	2–0	Al-Dera'a
Al-Wehda	3–0	Al-Shoulla
Al-Ittihad	3–0	Al-Kefah
Ohod	0–2	Al-Nassr
Okaz	1–0	Al-Lewaa
Al-Ansar	1–3 (aet)	Al-Ettifaq
Al-Orobah	2–3	Al-Taraji
Al-Oyoon	1–0	Damac
Al-Shabab	4–0	Al-Amal
Al-Ahli	0–2	Al-Hilal
Al-Nakhil	1–0	Al-Watani
Al-Nahda	4–3	Al-Khaleej

== Round of 16 ==
The Round of 16 matches were held on 15 and 16 April 1982.

Home team	Score	Away team
Al-Thoqbah	1–0	Okaz
Al-Wehda	2–1	Al-Qadsiah
Al-Taawoun	1–0	Al-Oyoon
Al-Kawkab	1–0	Al-Rawdhah
Al-Nakhil	0–1	Al-Ittihad
Al-Nahda	1–3	Al-Ettifaq
Al-Hilal	4–0	Al-Taraji
Al-Shabab	1–0 (aet)	Al-Nassr

== Quarter-finals ==
The Quarter-final matches were held on 22 and 23 April 1982.

Home team	Score	Away team
Al-Wehda	3–0	Al-Thoqbah
Al-Taawoun	1–3	Al-Kawkab
Al-Hilal	1–1 (4–3 pen.)	Al-Shabab
Al-Ittihad	5–1	Al-Ettifaq

== Semi-finals ==
The four winners of the quarter-finals progressed to the semi-finals. The semi-finals were played on 29 and 30 April 1982. All times are local, AST (UTC+3).

29 April 1982
16:00

Al-Ittihad	1–0	Al-Wehda
Al-Qarni 35'	Report

Youth Welfare Stadium in Jeddah, Jeddah
Referee: Fahad Al-Mohawis
30 April 1982
16:00

Al-Hilal	2–1	Al-Kawkab
Al-Naseeb 3'; Al-Rahma 32'	Report	Al-Nafisah 20'

Youth Welfare Stadium in Al-Malaz, Riyadh
Referee: Muthaib Al-Joaid

== Final ==
The final was played between Al-Ittihad and Al-Hilal in the Youth Welfare Stadium in Al-Malaz, Riyadh.

7 May 1982
15:30 (UTC+3)

Al-Ittihad	1–3	Al-Hilal
Sobhi 50' (pen.)	Report	Nu'eimeh 22'; Al-Jarboo 40'; Bashir 66'

Youth Welfare Stadium in Al-Malaz, Riyadh
Attendance: 27,000
Referee: Mohammed Foda
