= 2014 King's Cup (Saudi Arabia) =

2014 King Cup
Tournament details
- Country: Saudi Arabia
- Dates: 11 February – 1 May 2014
- Teams: 32

Final positions
- Champions: Al-Shabab
- Runners-up: Al-Ahli

Tournament statistics
- Matches played: 33
- Goals scored: 113 (3.42 per match)
- Top goal scorer: Papa Waigo (4 goals)

The 2014 King Cup, or The Custodian of The Two Holy Mosques Cup, was the 39th season of King Cup since its establishment in 1957, and the 7th under the current edition. Al-Ittihad was the defending champion but was eliminated by Al-Ahli in semi-finals.

Unlike the previous seasons where only eight teams participated, this season's competition featured a total of 32 teams. 14 teams of Pro league and 16 teams of 1st Division, and 2 teams qualifying from preliminary stage.

The final was held at the King Abdullah Sports City, in Jeddah. Al-Shabab won their third title after beating Al-Ahli 3–0.

== Round of 32 ==
Team 1	Score	Team 2
Hajer	2–0	Hottain
Al-Wehda	3–1	Al-Khaleej
Al-Shoalah	1–2	Al-Zulfi
Al-Raed	1–0	Ohud
Al-Ittihad	4–0	Al-Sarawat
Al-Nassr	4–1	Al-Hazm
Al-Qadisiyah	2–4	Al-Hilal
Al-Riyadh	0–3	Al-Nahda
Al-Shabab	3–1	Al-Kawkab
Al-Jeel	1–2	Al-Fateh
Al-Draih	0–3	Al-Ettifaq
Al-Faisaly	4–1	Al-Batin
Al-Taawon	0–1	Al-Ta'ee
Abha	3–2 (a.e.t.)	Najran
Al-Orobah	2–1	Al-Watani
Al-Ahli	5–0	Al-Ansar

== Round of 16 ==
Team 1	Score	Team 2
Al-Fateh	0–1	Al-Ettifaq
Al-Zulfi	1–3	Al-Hilal
Al-Shabab	2–1	Al-Nassr
Al-Ittihad	5–3 (a.e.t.)	Al-Nahda
Al-Ta'ee	1–0	Al-Wehda
Al-Faisaly	2–2 (a.e.t.) (5–4 p)	Abha
Hajer	1–4	Al-Raed
Al-Ahli	3–0	Al-Orobah

== Quarter-finals ==
Team 1	Score	Team 2
Al-Raed	0–3	Al-Ittihad
Al-Hilal	0–1	Al-Shabab
Al-Ta'ee	0–3	Al-Ahli
Al-Faisaly	0–4	Al-Ettifaq

== Semi-finals ==
Team 1	Agg.	Team 2	1st leg	2nd leg
Al-Ahli	5–3	Al-Ittihad	2–1	3–2
Al-Ettifaq	2–3	Al-Shabab	2–2	0–1

=== First leg ===
19 April 2014	Al-Ahli	2–1	Al-Ittihad	Makkah
20:50 (UTC+3)	Aman 30'; Leal 62'		26' Al-Muwallad	Stadium: King Abdul Aziz Stadium

20 April 2014	Al-Ettifaq	2–2	Al-Shabab	Dammam
20:45 (UTC+3)	Papa Waigo 38', 71'		82' Assiri; 90+1' Al-Marshedi	Stadium: Prince Mohamed bin Fahd Stadium

=== Second leg ===
27 April 2014	Al-Shabab	1–0	Al-Ettifaq	Riyadh
20:45 (UTC+3)	Al-Ghamdi 50'			Stadium: King Fahd International Stadium

27 April 2014	Al-Ittihad	2–3	Al-Ahli	Makkah
20:50 (UTC+3)	Asiri 17'; Leandro 43' (pen.)		15' Al-Jassim; 22' Mossoró; 31' Aman	Stadium: King Abdul Aziz Stadium

== Final ==
1 May 2014
20:45 (UTC+3)

Al-Ahli	0–3	Al-Shabab
	Report	11' (pen.) Fernando; 18', 47' Assiri

King Abdullah Sports City, Jeddah
Attendance: 62,241
Referee: Viktor Kassai, (Hungary)

=== Winner ===
2014 King Cup
Winners
Al-Shabab
3rd Title
