= 1977 King Cup =

Tournament details
- Country: Saudi Arabia
- Dates: 5 – 28 May 1977
- Teams: 32

Final positions
- Champions: Al-Ahli (7th title)
- Runners-up: Al-Hilal

Tournament statistics
- Matches played: 31
- Goals scored: 105 (3.39 per match)

The 1977 King Cup was the 19th season of the knockout competition since its establishment in 1956. Al-Nassr were the defending champions; however, they were eliminated in the semi-finals by Al-Hilal. The final saw Al-Ahli beat Al-Hilal 3–1, with Al-Ahli scoring all three goals in the final fifteen minutes. Al-Ahli won their seventh title and first since 1973.

== Bracket ==
Round of 32
H	Al-Hilal	3
A	Al-Shoulla	0
A	Al-Hamadah	0
H	Al-Ettifaq	7
A	Tuwaiq	1
H	Al-Diriyah	0
A	Al-Shabab	1
H	Al-Taawoun	0
H	Al-Qadsiah	5
A	Al-Fateh	0
A	Al-Khaleej	5
H	Al-Jazeera	3
H	Al-Nahda	2
A	Al-Thoqbah	0
A	Hajer	0
H	Al-Nassr	4
H	Al-Tai	2
A	Al-Ansar	0
A	Al-Ittihad	4
H	Al-Jabalain	1
A	Al-Rabe'e	0
H	Ohod	5
H	Al-Raed (a.e.t.)	2
A	Al-Riyadh	0
A	Al-Taqadom	0
H	Al-Wehda	2
H	Al-Majd	1 (3)
A	Al-Kefah (pen.)	1 (4)
H	Okaz	2
A	Al-Wadea	1
A	Damac	0
H	Al-Ahli	4

Round of 16
H	Al-Hilal (a.e.t.)	2
A	Al-Ettifaq	1
A	Tuwaiq	0
H	Al-Shabab	4
H	Al-Qadsiah	2
A	Al-Khaleej	0
H	Al-Nahda	1
A	Al-Nassr	4
A	Al-Tai	0
H	Al-Ittihad	4
H	Ohod	2
A	Al-Raed	1
H	Al-Wehda	4
A	Al-Kefah	0
H	Okaz	1
A	Al-Ahli	2

Quarter-finals
H	Al-Hilal	3
A	Al-Shabab	0
A	Al-Qadsiah	1
H	Al-Nassr	2
H	Al-Ittihad (pen.)	1 (3)
A	Ohod	1 (2)
A	Al-Wehda	0
H	Al-Ahli	1

Semi-finals
H	Al-Hilal	2
A	Al-Nassr	0
A	Al-Ittihad	2
H	Al-Ahli	4

Final
–	Al-Hilal	1
–	Al-Ahli	3

Source: Al-Jazirah

== Round of 32 ==
The matches of the Round of 32 were held on 5 and 6 May 1977.

Home team	Score	Away team
Al-Ettifaq	7–0	Al-Hamadah
Al-Diriyah	0–1	Tuwaiq
Al-Tai	2–0	Al-Ansar
Al-Nassr	4–0	Hajer
Al-Raed	2–0 (a.e.t.)	Al-Riyadh
Al-Majd	1–1 (3–4 pen.)	Al-Kefah
Al-Qadsiah	5–0	Al-Fateh
Al-Nahda	2–0	Al-Thoqbah
Al-Ahli	4–0	Damac
Okaz	2–1	Al-Wadea
Al-Taqadom	0–2	Al-Wehda
Ohod	5–0	Al-Rabe'e
Al-Jabalain	1–4	Al-Ittihad
Al-Taawoun	0–1	Al-Shabab
Al-Hilal	3–0	Al-Shoulla
Al-Jazeera	3–5	Al-Khaleej

== Round of 16 ==
The Round of 16 matches were held on 9 and 10 May 1977.

Home team	Score	Away team
Al-Hilal	2–1 (a.e.t.)	Al-Ettifaq
Al-Nahda	1–4	Al-Nassr
Okaz	1–2	Al-Ahli
Al-Wehda	4–0	Al-Kefah
Ohod	2–1	Al-Raed
Al-Ittihad	4–0	Al-Tai
Al-Shabab	4–0	Tuwaiq
Al-Qadsiah	2–0	Al-Khaleej

== Quarter-finals ==
The Quarter-final matches were held on 12 and 13 May 1977.

Home team	Score	Away team
Al-Nassr	2–1	Al-Qadsiah
Al-Ittihad	1–1 (3–2 pen.)	Ohod
Al-Ahli	1–0	Al-Wehda
Al-Hilal	3–0	Al-Shabab

== Semi-finals ==
The four winners of the quarter-finals progressed to the semi-finals. The semi-finals were played on 16 May 1977. All times are local, AST (UTC+3).

16 May 1977

Al-Hilal	2–0	Al-Nassr
Al-Habshi 5'; Abdulmatloub 73'	Report

Youth Welfare Stadium in Al-Malaz, Riyah
Referee: Abdulrahman Al-Dahham
16 May 1977

Al-Ahli	4–2	Al-Ittihad
Al-Sagheer 1', 14'; Rizq 32', 41'	Report	Zarie 34'; Al-Otaibi 75'

Youth Welfare Stadium in Jeddah, Jeddah
Referee: Fahad Al-Dahmash

== Final ==
The final was played between Al-Ahli and Al-Hilal in the Youth Welfare Stadium in Riyadh. This was Al-Ahli's 9th final. Previously Al-Ahli won six times in 1962, 1965, 1969, 1970, 1971, and 1973 and lost in 1974 and 1976. This was Al-Hilal's 5th final. Previously Al-Hilal won twice in 1961 and 1964 and lost in 1963 and 1968. This was the first meeting between these two sides in the final.

27 May 1977
15:30 (UTC+3)

Al-Hilal	1–3	Al-Ahli
Naseeb 53'	Report	Al-Sagheer 74', 76'; Mansi 78'

Youth Welfare Stadium in Al-Malaz, Riyadh
Referee: Fahad Al-Dahmash

Team details

Al-Hilal
Al-Ahli

GK	(Saudi Arabia) Ibrahim Al-Yousef
DF	(Saudi Arabia) Ghazi Saeed
DF	(Saudi Arabia) Baddah Al-Qahtani
DF	(Saudi Arabia) Abdulrahman Basheer (c)
DF	(Saudi Arabia) Nasser Al-Shayea
MF	(Saudi Arabia) Fahad Al-Habashi
MF	(Saudi Arabia) Abdullah Foudah
MF	(Saudi Arabia) Marzouq Saeed
FW	(Saudi Arabia) Naji Abdulmatloub
FW	(Saudi Arabia) Sultan bin Naseeb
FW	(Saudi Arabia) Sameer Sultan
Substitutes:
GK	(Saudi Arabia) Khaled Fahmi
DF	(Saudi Arabia) Abdullah Al-Ammar
DF	(Saudi Arabia) Saleh Al-Nu'eimeh
MF	(Saudi Arabia) Abdullah Al-Gassab
MF	(Saudi Arabia) Fahad Abdulwahed
Manager:
(England) George Smith

GK	(Saudi Arabia) Adel Rawas
DF	(Saudi Arabia) Ibrahim Muraiki
DF	(Saudi Arabia) Waheed Jawhar
DF	(Saudi Arabia) Abdulrazaq Abu Dawood (c)
DF	(Saudi Arabia) Fahad Eid
MF	(Saudi Arabia) Idris Adam
MF	(Saudi Arabia) Tarik Kayal
MF	(Saudi Arabia) Ahmed Al-Sagheer
FW	(Saudi Arabia) Fuad Rizq
FW	(Sudan) Motamad Khojali
FW	(Egypt) Ismail Hefni	Substituted off
Substitutes:
GK	(Saudi Arabia) Ghazi Saddakah
DF	(Saudi Arabia) Mohammed Anbar
DF	(Saudi Arabia) Wajdi Al-Taweel
MF	(Saudi Arabia) Abdullah Omar
FW	(Saudi Arabia) Saad Mansi Al-Harbi	Substituted on
Manager:
(Brazil) Didi
