= 1990 King Cup =

Tournament details
- Country: Saudi Arabia
- Dates: 3 – 25 May 1990
- Teams: 16

Final positions
- Champions: Al-Nassr (6th title)
- Runners-up: Al-Taawoun
- Asian Cup Winners' Cup: Al-Nassr
- Arab Cup Winners' Cup: Al-Nassr

Tournament statistics
- Matches played: 15
- Goals scored: 39 (2.6 per match)
- Top goal scorer: Majed Abdullah (5 goals)

The 1990 King Cup was the 32nd season of the knockout competition since its establishment in 1956. Al-Hilal were the defending champions but they were eliminated by Al-Riyadh in the Round of 16. This season was the final season of the competition. the Cup then returned under the name of King Cup of Champions in 2008.

Al-Nassr won their 6th title after defeating Al-Taawoun 2–0 in the final. By reaching the final Al-Taawoun became the second First Division side to reach the final after Al-Riyadh in 1978. As winners of the tournament, Al-Nassr qualified for both the 1991 Arab Cup Winners' Cup and the 1991–92 Asian Cup Winners' Cup.

== Bracket ==
Round of 16
H	Al-Ittihad	3
A	Al-Tai	1
A	Al-Hilal	1
H	Al-Riyadh	3
H	Al-Nassr	3
A	Hajer	1
H	Al-Qadsiah	2 (4)
A	Al-Ettifaq (pen.)	2 (5)
H	Al-Wehda (pen.)	1 (4)
A	Al-Ahli	1 (2)
A	Al-Nahda (pen.)	1 (5)
H	Damac	1 (3)
A	Al-Taawoun	2
H	Al-Suqoor	0
H	Al-Raed	1
A	Al-Shabab (aet)	2

Quarter-finals
H	Al-Ittihad (pen.)	1 (4)
A	Al-Riyadh	1 (2)
H	Al-Nassr	3
A	Al-Ettifaq	1
H	Al-Wehda	2
A	Al-Nahda	0
H	Al-Taawoun (aet)	2
A	Al-Shabab	1

Semi-finals
H	Al-Ittihad	0 (8)
A	Al-Nassr (pen.)	0 (9)
H	Al-Wehda	0
A	Al-Taawoun	1

Final
–	Al-Nassr	2
–	Al-Taawoun	0

Note: H: Home team, A: Away team

== Round of 16 ==
The matches of the Round of 16 were held on 3 and 4 May 1990.

Home team	Score	Away team
Al-Riyadh	3–1	Al-Hilal
Al-Wehda	1–1 (4–2 pen.)	Al-Ahli
Al-Suqoor	0–2	Al-Taawoun
Damac	1–1 (3–5 pen.)	Al-Nahda
Al-Qadsiah	2–2 (4–5 pen.)	Al-Ettifaq
Al-Raed	1–2 (aet)	Al-Shabab
Al-Nassr	3–1	Hajer
Al-Ittihad	3–1	Al-Tai

== Quarter-finals ==
The matches of the Quarter-finals were held on 10 and 11 May 1990.

Home team	Score	Away team
Al-Taawoun	2–1 (aet)	Al-Shabab
Al-Ittihad	1–1 (3–1 pen.)	Al-Riyadh
Al-Wehda	2–0	Al-Nahda
Al-Nassr	3–1	Al-Ettifaq

== Semi-finals ==
The four winners of the quarter-finals progressed to the semi-finals. The semi-finals were played on 17 and 18 May 1990. All times are local, AST (UTC+3).

17 May 1990
20:00

Al-Wehda	0–1	Al-Taawoun
	Report	Al-Barjas 68'

King Abdul Aziz Stadium, Mecca
Referee: Omar Al-Shaqeer
18 May 1990
20:00

Al-Ittihad	0–0	Al-Nassr
	Report
Penalties
Al-Thaqafi (penalty scored); Ghurab (penalty scored); Reihan (penalty scored); Fawal (penalty missed); Bassas (penalty scored); Jamil (penalty scored); Al-Sanie (penalty scored); Hakami (penalty scored); Suwayed (penalty scored); Fareej (penalty missed)	8–9	(penalty missed) Al-Metlaq; (penalty scored) Abdullah; (penalty scored) Idris; (penalty scored) Al-Tareer; (penalty scored) Al-Jam'an; (penalty scored) Al-Masoud; (penalty scored) Al-Atiq; (penalty scored) Al-Marhoum; (penalty scored) Al-Omran; (penalty scored) Al-Ghamdi

Youth Welfare Stadium in Jeddah, Jeddah
Referee: Saad Al-Rabiah

== Final ==
The final was played between Al-Nassr and Al-Taawoun in the Youth Welfare Stadium in Jeddah. Al-Nassr were appearing in their 10th final while Al-Taawoun reached the final for the first time.

25 May 1990
16:00 (UTC+3)

Al-Nassr	2–0	Al-Taawoun
Majed Abdullah 31', 58'	Report

Youth Welfare Stadium in Jeddah, Jeddah
Referee: Saad Al-Rabiah

Team details

Al-Nassr
Al-Taawoun

GK	21	(Saudi Arabia) Shaker Al-Olayan
DF	4	(Saudi Arabia) Mustafa Idris
DF	6	(Saudi Arabia) Mohammed Al-Ateeq
DF	3	(Saudi Arabia) Waleed Al-Ghamdi
DF	2	(Saudi Arabia) Musaed Al-Torair
MF	5	(Saudi Arabia) Saleh Al-Mutlaq
MF	17	(Saudi Arabia) Marhoum Al-Marhoum
MF	7	(Saudi Arabia) Fahad Al-Masoud
FW	8	(Saudi Arabia) Fahad Al-Bishi
FW	9	(Saudi Arabia) Majed Abdullah (c)
FW	11	(Saudi Arabia) Mohaisen Al-Jam'an
Substitutes:
GK	1	(Saudi Arabia) Salem Marwan
DF	12	(Saudi Arabia) Nasser Al-Murshad
MF	10	(Saudi Arabia) Bandar Al-Omran
MF	16	(Saudi Arabia) Khaled Al-Aboudi
FW	18	(Saudi Arabia) Saeed Al-Ghamdi
Manager:
(Brazil) Cláudio Duarte

GK	1	(Saudi Arabia) Abdullah Al-Ghaith
DF	2	(Saudi Arabia) Hamoud Al-Arifi
DF	4	(Saudi Arabia) Fahad Al-Taiami
DF	5	(Saudi Arabia) Mohammed Al-Awdhi
DF	3	(Saudi Arabia) Sulaiman Al-Rashoudi
MF	14	(Saudi Arabia) Lahem Al-Lahem
MF	11	(Saudi Arabia) Abdulaziz Al-Naeemah
MF	16	(Saudi Arabia) Abdullah Al-Arifi (c)
MF	8	(Saudi Arabia) Ahmed Al-Zaaq	(substituted off) 49'
FW	15	(Saudi Arabia) Moussa Al-Barjas
FW	7	(Saudi Arabia) Moussa Al-Moussa
Substitutes:
GK	22	(Saudi Arabia) Nasseem Al-Wabli
DF	6	(Saudi Arabia) Abdulrahman Al-Beebi
MF	12	(Saudi Arabia) Ibrahim Al-Mohaisen
MF	20	(Saudi Arabia) Khaled Al-Fawzan
FW	9	(Saudi Arabia) Hammad Al-Hammad	(substituted on) 49'
Manager:
(Tunisia) Amor Dhib

== Top goalscorers ==
Rank	Player	Club	Goals
1	(Saudi Arabia) Majed Abdullah	Al-Nassr	5
2	(Saudi Arabia) Fahad Al-Mehallel	Al-Shabab	3
2	(Saudi Arabia) Abdullah Ghurab	Al-Ittihad	3
