= Fallaj Al-Shanar =

Saudi Arabian football referee (born 1947)

- Full name: Fallaj Khuzam Al-Shanar
- Born: 10 October 1947 (age 79); Saudi Arabia

Domestic
Years	League	Role
?	Saudi Premier League	Referee

International
Years	League	Role
?	FIFA listed	Referee

Fallaj Khuzam Al-Shanar (Arabic: فلاج خزام الشنار) (born October 10, 1947) is a retired Saudi football referee. He is known for having refereed one match in the 1986 FIFA World Cup in Mexico.
