= 1984 King Cup =

Tournament details
- Country: Saudi Arabia
- Dates: 21 March – 6 May 1984
- Teams: 32

Final positions
- Champions: Al-Hilal (5th title)
- Runners-up: Al-Ahli

Tournament statistics
- Matches played: 31
- Goals scored: 86 (2.77 per match)
- Top goal scorer: Mansour Bashir (5 goals)

The 1984 King Cup was the 26th season of the knockout competition since its establishment in 1956. Al-Ahli were the defending champions but they finished as runners-up.

Al-Hilal won the competition for the fifth time, beating the defending champions Al-Ahli 4–0 in the final at the Youth Welfare Stadium in Riyadh.

== Bracket ==
Round of 32
H	Al-Wadea	2
A	Al-Jazeera	3
A	Al-Riyadh	0
H	Al-Nassr	1
H	Al-Raed	1
A	Al-Qala	2
H	Damac	2
A	Jarash	0
H	Al-Taawoun	4
A	Al-Rabe'e	1
A	Al-Tuhami	0
H	Al-Hilal	2
H	Sdoos (pen.)	0 (3)
A	Al-Qotah	0 (2)
H	Al-Fateh	3 (0)
A	Al-Ettifaq (pen.)	3 (3)
H	Al-Ansar	1 (4)
A	Ohod (pen.)	1 (5)
H	Al-Shoulla	2 (3)
A	Al-Tai (pen.)	2 (5)
H	Al-Khaleej	0
A	Al-Ittihad	1
H	Al-Taraji	0 (4)
A	Hajer	0 (5)
H	Al-Shabab	2
A	Al-Nahda	4
H	Al-Rawdhah	0
A	Al-Ahli	1
H	Al-Qadsiah	2
A	Al-Kawkab	1
H	Al-Wehda	2
A	Al-Jabalain	1

Round of 16
H	Al-Jazeera	0
A	Al-Nassr	6
A	Al-Qala	1
H	Damac	2
H	Al-Taawoun	0
A	Al-Hilal	2
A	Sdoos	0
H	Al-Ettifaq	1
A	Ohod	2
H	Al-Tai	0
H	Al-Ittihad	7
A	Hajer	0
A	Al-Nahda	0
H	Al-Ahli	1
A	Al-Qadsiah	2 (1)
H	Al-Wehda (pen.)	2 (3)

Quarter-finals
A	Al-Nassr	1
H	Damac (a.e.t.)	2
A	Al-Hilal	1
H	Al-Ettifaq	0
A	Ohod	0
H	Al-Ittihad	3
H	Al-Ahli	1
A	Al-Wehda	0

Semi-finals
A	Damac	1
H	Al-Hilal	2
H	Al-Ittihad	0
A	Al-Ahli	1

Final
–	Al-Hilal	4
–	Al-Ahli	0

Source: Al-Jazirah

== Round of 32 ==
The matches of the Round of 32 were played on 21, 22, 23 and 25 March 1984.

Home team	Score	Away team
Damac	2–0	Jarash
Al-Shabab	2–4	Al-Nahda
Al-Raed	1–2	Al-Qala
Al-Ansar	1–1 (4–5 pen.)	Ohod
Al-Taraji	0–0 (4–5 pen.)	Hajer
Al-Wehda	2–1	Al-Jabalain
Al-Wadea	2–3	Al-Jazeera
Al-Taawoun	4–1	Al-Rabe'e
Al-Nassr	1–0	Al-Riyadh
Al-Rawdhah	0–1	Al-Ahli
Al-Khaleej	0–1	Al-Ittihad
Al-Shoulla	2–2 (3–5 pen.)	Al-Tai
Al-Hilal	2–0	Al-Tuhami
Al-Fateh	3–3 (0–3 pen.)	Al-Ettifaq
Al-Qadsiah	2–1	Al-Kawkab
Sdoos	0–0 (3–2 pen.)	Al-Qotah

== Round of 16 ==
The Round of 16 matches were held on 29 and 30 March 1984.

Home team	Score	Away team
Damac	2–1	Al-Qala
Al-Taawoun	0–2	Al-Hilal
Al-Ettifaq	1–0	Sdoos
Al-Tai	0–2	Ohod
Al-Ittihad	7–0	Hajer
Al-Wehda	2–2 (3–1 pen.)	Al-Qadsiah
Al-Jazeera	0–6	Al-Nassr
Al-Ahli	1–0	Al-Nahda

== Quarter-finals ==
The Quarter-final matches were held on 5 and 6 April 1984.

Home team	Score	Away team
Al-Ettifaq	0–1	Al-Hilal
Al-Ittihad	3–0	Ohod
Al-Ahli	1–0	Al-Wehda
Damac	2–1 (aet)	Al-Nassr

== Semi-finals ==
The four winners of the quarter-finals progressed to the semi-finals. The semi-finals were played on 12 and 13 April 1984. All times are local, AST (UTC+3).

12 April 1984
16:30

Al-Hilal	2–1	Damac
Bashir 27', 62'	Report	Saad 87'

Youth Welfare Stadium in Al-Malaz, Riyadh
Referee: Hamad Al-Homaimadi
13 April 1984
16:30

Al-Ittihad	0–1	Al-Ahli
	Report	Al-Sagheer 15' (pen.)

Youth Welfare Stadium in Jeddah, Jeddah
Referee: Mohammed Al-Shareef

== Final ==
The final was played between Al-Hilal and Al-Ahli in the Youth Welfare Stadium in Riyadh. Al-Ahli were appearing in their 13th final while Al-Hilal reached the final for the 9th time.

6 May 1984
15:45 (UTC+3)

Al-Hilal	4–0	Al-Ahli
Al-Ghanem 18'; Bashir 47'; Al-Musaibeah 65'; Al-Yousef 88'	Report

Youth Welfare Stadium in Al-Malaz, Riyadh
Referee: Fallaj Al-Shannar

== Top goalscorers ==
Rank	Player	Club	Goals
1	(Saudi Arabia) Mansour Bashir	Al-Hilal	5
2	(Saudi Arabia) Abo Samrah	Al-Ittihad	4
2	(Saudi Arabia) Mohamed Al-Suwaiyed	Damac	4
4	(Saudi Arabia) Abdulrahman Al-Muraished	Al-Taawoun	3
4	(Saudi Arabia) Abdullah Ghurab	Al-Ittihad	3
4	(Saudi Arabia) Salah Al-Muwallad	Al-Ittihad	3
