= Al-Majd Club =

Association football club in Saudi Arabia

Al-Majd
- Full name: Al-Majd Club
- Founded: 1957
- Ground: Yanbu, Saudi Arabia
- Owner: Ministry of Sport
Home colours	Away colours

Al-Majd Club is a Saudi Arabian football team based in Yanbu which plays in the Saudi Third Division.

Al-Majd was promoted from the Saudi Fourth Division during the 2025-2026 season.
