= 1987 King Cup =

Tournament details
- Country: Saudi Arabia
- Dates: 23 February – 13 March 1987
- Teams: 16

Final positions
- Champions: Al-Nassr (5th title)
- Runners-up: Al-Hilal

Tournament statistics
- Matches played: 15
- Goals scored: 42 (2.8 per match)
- Top goal scorer: Majed Abdullah (5 goals)

The 1987 King Cup was the 29th season of the knockout competition since its establishment in 1956. Al-Nassr were the defending champions and successfully defended their title by beating Al-Hilal 1–0 in the final. They became the first team since Al-Ahli in 1979 to successfully defend the title.

== Bracket ==
Round of 16
H	Al-Qadsiah	1
A	Al-Arabi	2
H	Al-Hilal (aet)	2
A	Al-Kawkab	1
H	Al-Nahda	3
A	Al-Ansar	1
H	Al-Ettifaq (pen.)	2 (4)
A	Al-Shabab	2 (3)
H	Al-Nassr	2
A	Al-Taawoun	0
H	Al-Ittihad (pen.)	0 (4)
A	Al-Ahli	0 (3)
H	Hajer (pen.)	1 (3)
A	Al-Tai	1 (2)
H	Al-Wehda	2
A	Al-Raed	1

Quarter-finals
A	Al-Arabi	0
H	Al-Hilal	4
A	Al-Nahda (pen.)	1 (5)
H	Al-Ettifaq	1 (3)
A	Al-Nassr	2
H	Al-Ittihad	1
H	Hajer (aet)	2
A	Al-Wehda	0

Semi-finals
H	Al-Hilal	3
A	Al-Nahda	1
A	Al-Nassr	4
H	Hajer	1

Final
–	Al-Hilal	0
–	Al-Nassr	1

Note: H: Home team, A: Away team

Source: Al Jazirah

== Round of 16 ==
The Round of 16 matches were held on 23, 26 and 27 February 1987.

Home team	Score	Away team
Al-Hilal	2–1 (aet)	Al-Kawkab
Al-Nassr	2–0	Al-Taawoun
Al-Ettifaq	2–2 (4–3 pen.)	Al-Shabab
Al-Wehda	2–1	Al-Raed
Hajer	1–1 (3–2 pen.)	Al-Tai
Al-Nahda	3–1	Al-Ansar
Al-Ittihad	0–0 (4–3 pen.)	Al-Ahli
Al-Qadsiah	1–2	Al-Arabi

== Quarter-finals ==
The Quarter-final matches were held on 2 March 1987.

Home team	Score	Away team
Al-Hilal	4–0	Al-Arabi
Al-Ettifaq	1–1 (3–5 pen.)	Al-Nahda
Hajer	2–0 (aet)	Al-Wehda
Al-Ittihad	1–2	Al-Nassr

== Semi-finals ==
The four winners of the quarter-finals progressed to the semi-finals. The semi-finals were played on 6 March 1987. All times are local, AST (UTC+3).

6 March 1987
15:40

Al-Hilal	3–1	Al-Nahda
Al-Dossari 12'; Al-Hammad 48'; Al-Thunayan 80'	Report	Al-Denini 42'

Youth Welfare Stadium in Al-Malaz, Riyadh
Referee: Hamad Al-Homaimadi
6 March 1987
15:40

Hajer	1–4	Al-Nassr
Al-Dhuwayhi 78' (pen.)	Report	Al-Shalqan 12', 15'; Abdullah 52'; Al-Bishi 68'

Prince Abdullah bin Jalawi Stadium, Al-Hasa
Referee: Khaled Thiab

== Final ==
The final was played between city rivals Al-Hilal and Al-Nassr at the Youth Welfare Stadium in Al-Malaz, Riyadh. Al-Hilal were appearing in their 11th while Al-Nassr were appearing in their 8th final. Al-Nassr were the defending champions.

13 March 1987
20:00 (UTC+3)

Al-Hilal	0–1	Al-Nassr
	Report	Abdullah 2'

Youth Welfare Stadium in Al-Malaz, Riyadh
Attendance: 38,000
Referee: Omer Al Mehannah

== Top goalscorers ==
Rank	Player	Club	Goals
1	(Saudi Arabia) Majed Abdullah	Al-Nassr	5
2	(Saudi Arabia) Hathal Al-Dossari	Al-Hilal	3
3	8 Players		2
