= King's Cup (Saudi Arabia) =

King's Cup كأس الملك The Custodian of the Two Holy Mosques' Cup كأس خادم الحرمين الشريفين
- Organiser(s): Saudi Arabian Football Federation (SAFF)
- Founded: 1966; 60 years ago 2008; 18 years ago (Re-established)
- Region: Saudi Arabia
- Teams: 32
- Qualifier for: AFC Champions League Two
- Domestic cup: Saudi Super Cup
- Current champions: Al Hilal (10th title)
- Most championships: Al-Hilal (10 titles)
- Broadcaster: Thmanyah
- 2026–27 King's Cup

The King's Cup, officially titled The Custodian of the Two Holy Mosques' Cup, is the Saudi Arabian football knockout cup competition.

The King's Cup is the second-oldest knockout competition in Saudi Arabian football, following the now-defunct Crown Prince Cup.

== History ==
The competition was originally established in 1957 as the His Majesty's Cup (commonly known as the King Cup) and was held annually until 1990. After a hiatus, the tournament was reintroduced in 2008 under the new name King Cup of Champions, featuring the top six finishers of the Saudi Premier League, along with the winners of the Saudi Crown Prince Cup and the Saudi Federation Cup.

In 2014, the tournament was officially renamed the Custodian of the Two Holy Mosques' Cup and returned to a broader knockout format, more closely resembling the original structure.

In 2025, the Saudi Arabian Football Federation revised the historical records of the King Cup following a comprehensive review and official documentation. As part of this revision, the Federation reclassified certain titles that were previously counted as King Cup wins as league championships, in order to align with their original competitive formats. This adjustment led to significant changes in the official title counts of various clubs—some teams saw an increase in their league championship totals, while their number of cup titles decreased accordingly.

Additionally, the establishment date of the King Cup was officially revised from 1957 to 1966, further aligning the competition’s historical framework with official documentation and structural changes.

== Trophy ==
In 2024, SAFF (Saudi Arabian Football Federation) revealed a newly redesigned trophy of the Custodian of the Two Holy Mosques Cup during a ceremony held in Riyadh. A new trophy was required because under the competition's regulations, a team that wins the cup three consecutive times or four times in total has the right to keep the original trophy.

Made by British silversmiths, Thomas Lyte, the trophy is made of sterling silver coated with 24-carat gold plate. It weighs 9.32 kg, and is 54 cm high, 18 cm wide, has a base diameter of 17 cm and is made of marble and malachite.

== Champions ==
=== List of champions ===
#	Year	Champions	Runners-up
King Cup
1	1966	Al-Wehda	Al-Ettifaq
2	1967	Al-Ittihad	Al-Nassr
3	1968	Al-Ettifaq	Al-Hilal
4	1969	Al-Ahli	Al-Shabab
–	1970–1975	Not held	
5	1976	Al-Nassr	Al-Ahli
6	1977	Al-Ahli	Al-Hilal
7	1978	Al-Ahli	Al-Riyadh
8	1979	Al-Ahli	Al-Ittihad
9	1980	Al-Hilal	Al-Shabab
10	1981	Al-Nassr	Al-Hilal
11	1982	Al-Hilal	Al-Ittihad
12	1983	Al-Ahli	Al-Ettifaq
13	1984	Al-Hilal	Al-Ahli
14	1985	Al-Ettifaq	Al-Hilal
15	1986	Al-Nassr	Al-Ittihad
16	1987	Al-Nassr	Al-Hilal
17	1988	Al-Ittihad	Al-Ettifaq
18	1989	Al-Hilal	Al-Nassr
19	1990	Al-Nassr	Al-Taawoun
–	1991–2007	Not held	
King Cup of Champions
20	2008	Al-Shabab	Al-Ittihad
21	2009	Al-Shabab	Al-Ittihad
22	2010	Al-Ittihad	Al-Hilal
23	2011	Al-Ahli	Al-Ittihad
24	2012	Al-Ahli	Al-Nassr
25	2013	Al-Ittihad	Al-Shabab
The Custodian of the Two Holy Mosques' Cup
26	2014	Al-Shabab	Al-Ahli
27	2015	Al-Hilal	Al-Nassr
28	2016	Al-Ahli	Al-Nassr
29	2017	Al-Hilal	Al-Ahli
30	2018	Al-Ittihad	Al-Faisaly
31	2019	Al-Taawoun	Al-Ittihad
32	2020	Al-Hilal	Al-Nassr
33	2021	Al-Faisaly	Al Taawoun
34	2022	Al-Fayha	Al-Hilal
35	2023	Al-Hilal	Al-Wehda
36	2024	Al-Hilal	Al-Nassr
37	2025	Al-Ittihad	Al-Qadsiah
38	2026	Al-Hilal	Al-Kholood

== Performance by club ==
=== Trophies ===
Club	Titles	Winning years
Al-Hilal	10	1980, 1982, 1984, 1989, 2015, 2017, 2020, 2023, 2024, 2026
Al-Ahli	8	1969, 1977, 1978, 1979, 1983, 2011, 2012, 2016
Al-Ittihad	6	1967, 1988, 2010, 2013, 2018, 2025
Al-Nassr	5	1976, 1981, 1986, 1987, 1990
Al-Shabab	3	2008, 2009, 2014
Al-Ettifaq	2	1968, 1985
Al-Wehda	1	1966
Al-Taawoun	1	2019
Al-Faisaly	1	2021
Al-Fayha	1	2022
Total	37	

== Topscorers ==
=== All-time top scorers ===
As of 19 August 2026

	Player	Nationality	Club(s)	Goals
1	Majed Abdullah	Saudi Arabia	Al-Nassr	39
2	Abderrazak Hamdallah	Morocco	Al-Nassr (20) Al-Ittihad (6) Al-Shabab (4) Al-Taawoun (1)	31
3	Amin Dabou	Saudi Arabia	Al-Ahli	28
4	Nasser Al-Shamrani Ahmed Al-Sogaier	Saudi Arabia Saudi Arabia	Al-Hilal (4); Al-Shabab (16) Al-Ahli (20)	20
5	Mukhtar Fallatah	Saudi Arabia	Al-Ittihad (11) Al-Wehda (7)	18
6	Léandre Tawamba	Cameroon	Al-Taawoun (12), Al-Tai (2)	14
7	Hussam Abu Dawood Omar Al-Somah	Saudi Arabia Syria	Al-Ahli (12) Al-Ahli (12)	12

=== Per season ===
Year	Player	Goals	Club
2008	(Saudi Arabia) Nasser Al-Shamrani	7	Al Shabab Club
2009	(Saudi Arabia) Nasser Al-Shamrani (Saudi Arabia) Waleed Al-Gizani	3	Al Shabab Club; Al-Hazem FC
2010	(Saudi Arabia) Saad Al-Harthi	5	Al-Nassr
2011	(Saudi Arabia) Mukhtar Fallatah	6	Al Shabab Club
2012	(Brazil) Élton Arábia	5	Al Fateh SC
2013	(Saudi Arabia) Mukhtar Fallatah (Saudi Arabia) Muhannad Assiri	4	Al Shabab Club; Al Wehda FC
2014	(Senegal) Papa Waigo	4	Al-Ettifaq Club
2015	(Brazil) Thiago Neves	5	Al Hilal SFC
2016	(Syria) Omar Al Somah	5	Al-Ahli Saudi FC
2017	(Syria) Omar Kharbin	5	Al Dhafra FC
2018	(Chile) Carlos Villanueva	4	Al-Ittihad
2019	(Morocco) Abderrazak Hamdallah	14	Al-Nassr
2020	(Madagascar) Carolus Andriamatsinoro	8	Al Adalah Club
2021	(Cameroon) Léandre Tawamba (Cape Verde) Júlio Tavares	4	Al Taawoun FC; Al Faisaly FC
2022	(Brazil) Carlos Silva Júnior	4	Al Shabab Club
2023	(Saudi Arabia) Abdulfattah Adam	3	Al-Nassr
2024	(Senegal) Sadio Mané (Serbia) Aleksandar Mitrović (Morocco) Abderrazak Hamdallah (Belgium) Yannick Carrasco	4	Al-Nassr; Al Hilal SFC; Al-Ittihad; Al Shabab Club
2025	(Colombia) Julián Quiñones	5	Al Qadsiah FC
2026	(England) Ivan Toney	6	Al-Ahli

== Hat-tricks ==
Player	For	Against	Score	Date
(Saudi Arabia) Youssef Anbar	Ohod	Al-Nahda	4–1	11 May 1989
(Saudi Arabia) Saad Al-Harthi	Al-Nassr	Al-Ahli	3–0	5 April 2010
(Brazil) Victor Simões	Al-Ahli	Al-Nassr	3–1	9 April 2010
(Saudi Arabia) Mukhtar Fallatah	Al-Wehda	Al-Ettifaq	4–3	11 January 2011
(Saudi Arabia) Nasser Al-Shamrani	Al-Hilal	Al-Faisaly	3–1	1 May 2015
(Poland) Adrian Mierzejewski	Al-Nassr	Diriyah	7–0	20 January 2016
(Nigeria) Patrick Friday Eze	Al-Qadsiah	Al-Safa	4–0	20 January 2017
(Guinea) Ismaël Bangoura	Al-Raed	Al-Jabalain	3–0	21 January 2017
(Syria) Omar Khribin	Al-Hilal	Al-Taawoun	4–3	13 May 2017
(Saudi Arabia) Mohammed Al-Saiari	Al-Ettifaq	Al-Tai	6–0	3 January 2018
(Morocco) Abderrazak Hamdallah	Al-Nassr	Al-Jandal	6–0	3 January 2019
(Eritrea) Ahmed Abdu Jaber^{4}	Al-Wehda	Al-Nairyah	6–1	3 January 2019
(Venezuela) Gelmin Rivas	Al-Hilal	Al-Dera'a	9–0	5 January 2019
(France) Bafétimbi Gomis^{4}	Al-Hilal	Al-Dera'a	9–0	5 January 2019
(Morocco) Abderrazak Hamdallah^{4}	Al-Nassr	Al-Ansar	5–0	18 January 2019
(Saudi Arabia) Hazaa Al-Hazaa	Al-Ettifaq	Al-Amjad	9–1	18 January 2019
(Morocco) Abderrazak Hamdallah	Al-Nassr	Al-Fayha	6–0	21 January 2019
(Madagascar) Carolus Andriamatsinoro^{5}	Al-Adalah	Al-Rawdah	8–0	5 December 2019
(Morocco) Abderrazak Hamdallah	Al-Nassr	Damac	4–2	24 December 2019
(Saudi Arabia) Mohammed Al-Kuwaykibi	Al-Ettifaq	Ohod	7–1	3 January 2020
(Cape Verde) Júlio Tavares	Al-Faisaly	Al-Taawoun	3–2	29 May 2021

== See also ==
- Saudi Arabian Football Federation
- Saudi Pro League
- Saudi Super Cup
- Saudi Crown Prince Cup
- Prince Faisal bin Fahd Cup
