= Rafael Barreto =

Rafael Barreto may refer to:

- Rafael Barreto (footballer) (born 1986), Brazilian footballer
- Rafael Barreto (singer) (born 1985), Brazilian singer
