= List of foreign Saudi Professional League players =

This is a list of foreign players in the Saudi Pro League, which commenced play in 2008. The following players must meet both of the following two criteria:

1. Have played at least one Pro League game. Players who were signed by Pro League clubs, but only played in cup and/or Asian games, or did not play in any competitive games at all, are not included.
2. Are considered foreign, i.e., outside Saudi Arabia determined by the following:

A player is considered foreign if his allegiance is not to play for the national team of Saudi Arabia.

More specifically,

- If a player has been capped on international level, the national team is used; if he has been capped by more than one country, the highest level (or the most recent) team is used.
- If a player has not been capped on international level, his country of birth is used, except those who clearly indicated to have switched his nationality to another nation.

Clubs listed are those for which the player has played at least one Pro game — and seasons are those in which the player has played at least one Pro League game. Note that seasons, not calendar years, are used. For example, "2008–11" indicates that the player has played in every season from 2008–09 to 2010–11, but not necessarily every calendar year from 2008 to 2011. Therefore, a player should always have a listing under at least two years — for instance, a player making his debut in 2011, during the 2011–12 season, will have '2011–12' after his name. This follows general practice in expressing sporting seasons in Saudi Arabia.

121 of the 207 foreign FIFA-affiliated nations have been represented in the Pro League. Kosovo became the most recent nation to be represented, with Bersant Celina making his debut for Al-Ettifaq against Al-Riyadh on 14 August 2026.

In bold: players who have played at least one Premier League game in the current season (2026–27), and are still at a club for which they have played. This does not include current players of a Pro League club who have not played a Pro League game in the current season.

Details correct as of 17 August 2026

== Albania ==
- **Nedim Bajrami** – **Al-Taawoun** – 2026–
- Sokol Cikalleshi – Al-Khaleej – 2022–23
- **Berat Djimsiti** – **Al-Diriyah** – 2026–
- Gilman Lika – Al-Faisaly – 2013–14
- Migen Memelli – Al-Faisaly, Al-Taawoun – 2010–13
- **Mario Mitaj** – **Al-Ittihad** – 2024–

== Algeria ==
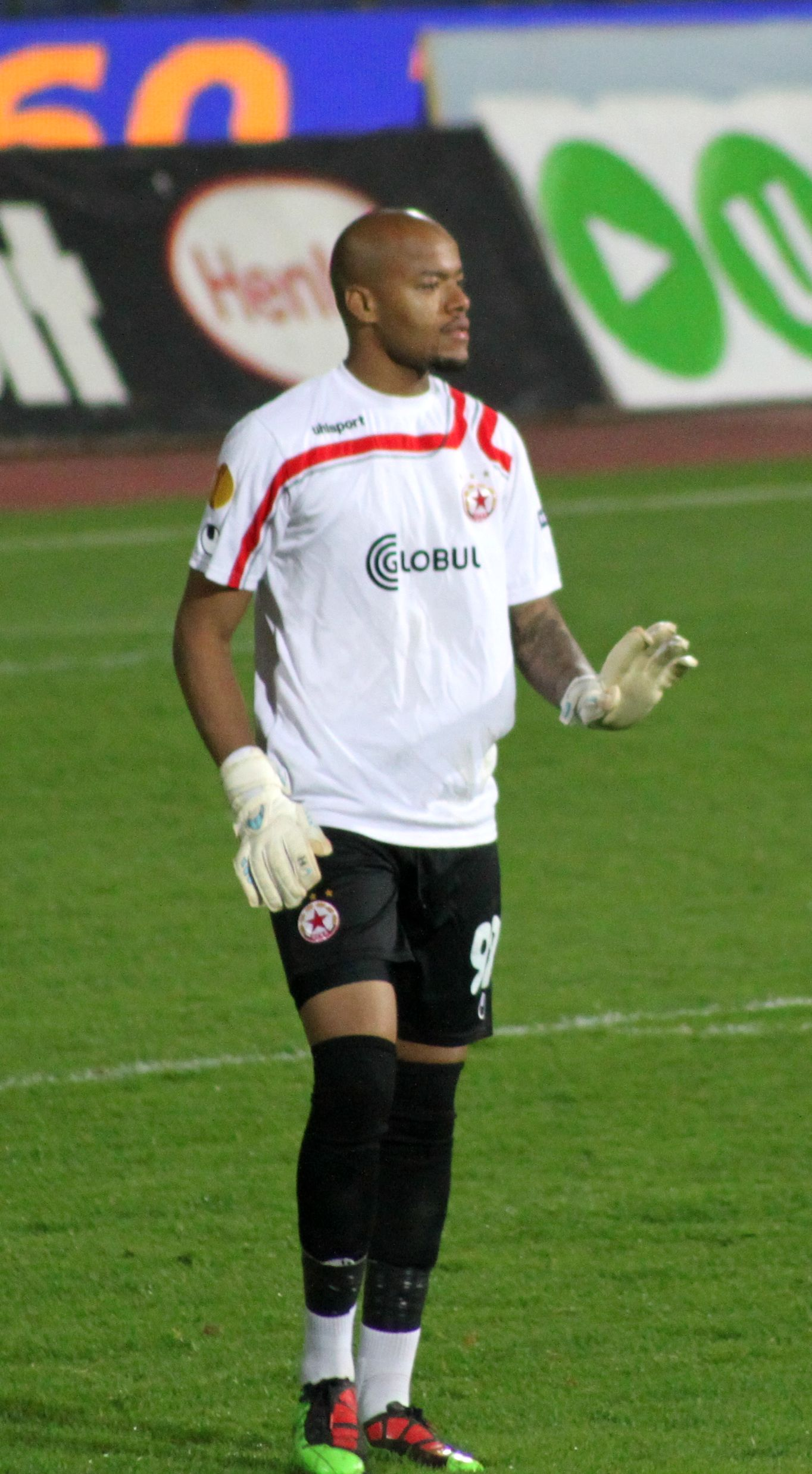
In September 2018, Raïs M'Bolhi became the first goalkeeper to win a Player of the Month award.

- Ayoub Abdellaoui – Al-Ettifaq – 2021–22
- Mehdi Abeid – Al-Raed – 2024–25
- Najib Ammari – Damac – 2019–20
- **Houssem Aouar** – **Al-Ittihad** – 2024–
- Malik Asselah – Al-Hazem – 2018–20, 2021–22
- Abdelkader Bedrane – Damac – 2022–26
- **Zineddine Belaïd** – **Al-Taawoun** – 2026–
- Youcef Belaïli – Al-Ahli – 2019–20
- Hicham Belkaroui – Al-Raed – 2018–19
- Mokhtar Belkhiter – Al-Qadsiah – 2018–19
- **Sofiane Bendebka** – Al-Fateh, **Al-Hazem** – 2019–
- Djamel Benlamri – Al-Shabab, Al-Khaleej – 2016–20, 2022–23
- **Saïd Benrahma** – **Neom** – 2025–
- Yassine Benzia – Al-Fayha – 2025–26
- Mohamed Benyettou – Al-Shabab – 2016–18
- Saïd Bouchouk – Al-Qadsiah – 2011–12
- Ryad Boudebouz – Al-Ahli – 2023–24
- Hadj Bouguèche – Al-Qadsiah, Al-Nassr, Al-Taawoun – 2011–13
- Salim Boukhanchouche – Abha – 2019–20
- Mohamed Boulaouidet – Ohod – 2017–18
- **Adil Boulbina** – **Al-Diriyah** – 2026–
- Ramzi Bourakba – Najran – 2011–12
- Yousri Bouzok – Al-Raed – 2024–25
- Farouk Chafaï – Damac – 2019–25
- Farid Cheklam – Najran – 2011–15
- Ibrahim Chenihi – Al-Fateh, Damac – 2018–21
- Mourad Delhoum – Al-Nassr – 2013–14
- Abdelmoumene Djabou – Al-Nassr – 2017–18
- Reda Benhadj Djillali – Najran – 2011–12
- Azzedine Doukha – Ohod, Al-Raed – 2017–21
- Abdelaziz Guechi – Al-Adalah – 2019–20
- Ryad Kenniche – Al-Qadsiah – 2017–18
- Nacereddine Khoualed – Ohod – 2017–18
- **Victor Lekhal** – **Al-Riyadh** – 2025–
- Raïs M'Bolhi – Al-Ettifaq – 2017–22
- Riyad Mahrez – Al-Ahli – 2023–26
- Adel Maïza – Al-Ahli – 2008–09
- Zidane Mebarakou – Al-Wehda – 2018–19
- Carl Medjani – Ohod – 2018–19
- Farid Mellouli – Al-Qadsiah – 2015–16
- Tayeb Meziani – Abha – 2021–23
- Mohamed Naâmani – Al-Fateh – 2018–19
- Chamseddine Rahmani – Damac – 2019–20
- Youcef Saïbi – Al-Ahli – 2008–09
- **Amir Sayoud** – Al-Tai, Al-Raed, **Al-Hazem** – 2021–
- Hillal Soudani – Al-Fateh, Damac – 2020–23
- Mehdi Tahrat – Abha – 2019–21
- Saphir Taïder – Al-Ain – 2020–21
- Antar Yahia – Al-Nassr – 2011–12
- Moustapha Zeghba – Al-Wehda, Damac – 2019–24
- Abdelmalek Ziaya – Al-Ittihad – 2010–12

== Angola ==
- Fábio Abreu – Al-Batin – 2020–22
- Valdo Alhinho – Al-Batin – 2017–18
- Flávio Amado – Al-Shabab – 2009–11
- Bastos – Al-Ain – 2020–21
- Hélder Costa – Al-Ittihad – 2022–23

== Argentina ==
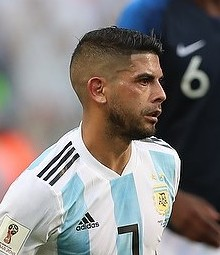
Argentina international Éver Banega joined Al-Shabab in 2020

- Éver Banega – Al-Shabab – 2020–24
- Mateo Borrell – Al-Okhdood – 2025–26
- Gonzalo Cabrera – Al-Faisaly – 2016–18
- Ezequiel Cerutti – Al-Hilal – 2018–19
- Juan Pablo Cozzani – Al-Kholood – 2025–26
- **Ramiro Enrique** – **Al-Kholood** – 2025–
- Ezequiel Fernández – Al-Qadsiah – 2024–25
- Tobías Figueroa – Al-Tai – 2021–22
- Víctor Figueroa – Al-Nassr – 2009–11
- Ramiro Funes Mori – Al-Nassr – 2021–22
- Rubén Gigena – Al-Qadsiah – 2009–10
- Leonardo Gil – Al-Ittihad – 2019–20
- Jonathan Gómez – Al-Fayha – 2017–19
- Cristian Guanca – Al-Ettifaq, Al-Shabab, Al-Taawoun – 2018–21, 2022–25
- Luciano Leguizamón – Al-Ittihad – 2009–10
- Cristian Lema – Damac – 2020–21
- Lisandro López – Al-Khaleej – 2023–24
- Damián Manso – Al-Nassr – 2012–13
- Pity Martínez – Al-Nassr – 2020–23
- Juan Mercier – Al-Nassr – 2011–12
- Diego Morales – Al-Ahli – 2012–13
- Fabián Noguera – Abha – 2023–24
- Lautaro Palacios – Al-Adalah – 2022–23
- **Luca Ramírez** – **Al-Riyadh** – 2025–
- Agustín Rossi – Al-Nassr – 2022–23
- Sebastián Rusculleda – Al-Ahli – 2009–10
- Rodrigo Salinas – Al-Ettifaq – 2017–18
- Javier Toledo – Al-Ahli – 2009–10
- **Valentín Vada** – Damac, **Neom** – 2025–
- Matías Vargas – Al-Fateh – 2024–26
- Emiliano Vecchio – Al-Ittihad – 2019–20
- Luciano Vietto – Al-Hilal, Al-Shabab – 2020–23
- Sergio Vittor – Damac – 2019–22
- Emilio Zelaya – Damac – 2019–22

== Armenia ==
- Marcos Pizzelli – Al-Raed, Al-Shabab – 2015–16, 2017–18
- **Eduard Spertsyan** – **Al-Ahli** – 2026–
- Lucas Zelarayán – Al-Fateh – 2023–25

== Australia ==
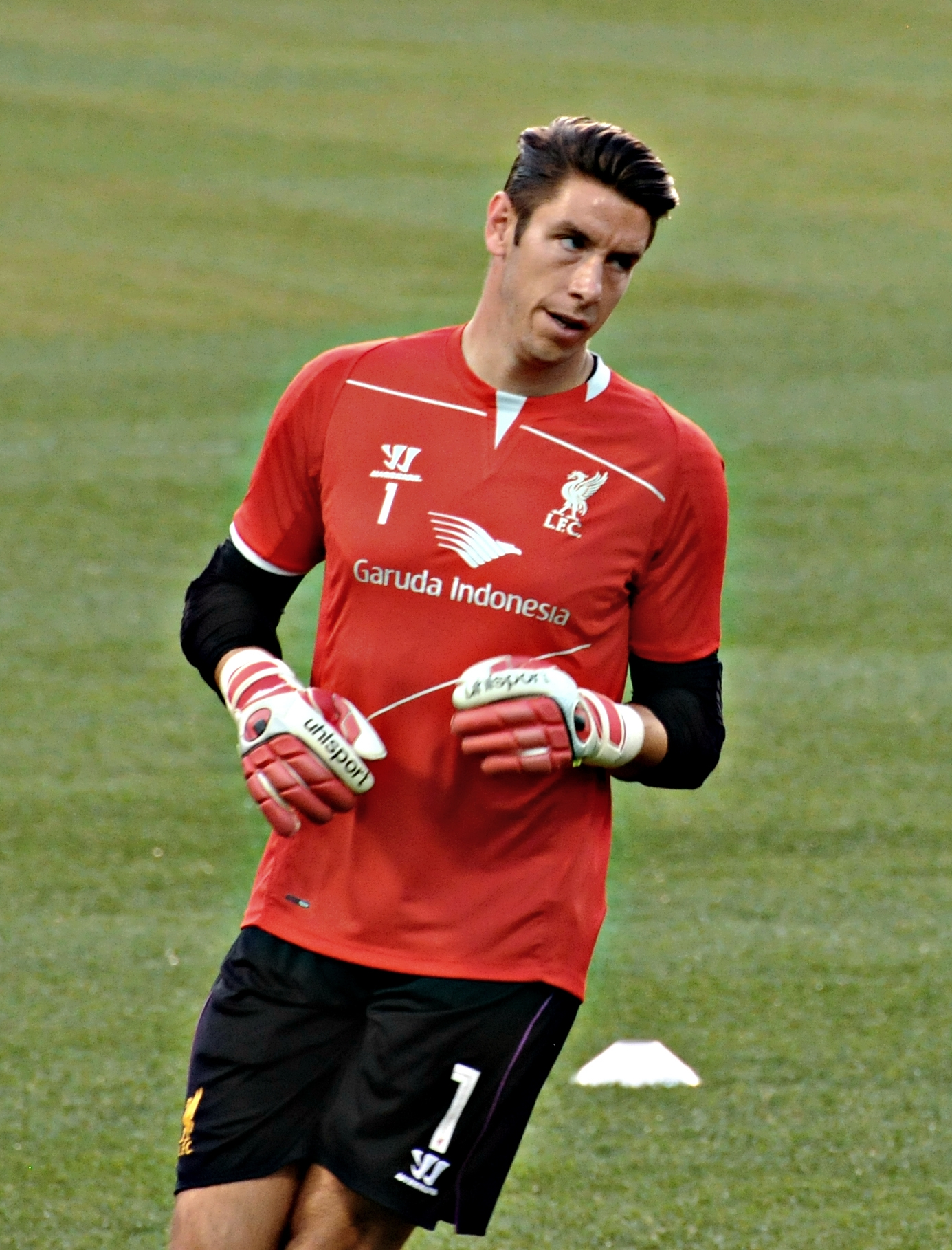
Brad Jones won the Pro League with Al-Nassr in 2018–19.

- Martin Boyle – Al-Faisaly – 2021–22
- Miloš Degenek – Al-Hilal – 2018–19
- Mitchell Duke – Al-Taawoun – 2020–21
- Jack Duncan – Al-Qadsiah – 2018–19
- Craig Goodwin – Al-Wehda, Abha – 2019–21, 2023–25
- Adam Griffiths – Al-Shabab – 2009–10
- Brad Jones – Al-Nassr – 2018–21
- Matthew Jurman – Al-Ittihad – 2018–19
- Osama Malik – Al-Batin – 2018–19
- Jonathan McKain – Al-Nassr – 2010–11
- Mark Milligan – Al-Ahli – 2017–18
- Dimitri Petratos – Al-Wehda – 2020–21
- James Troisi – Al-Ittihad – 2015–16
- Rhys Williams – Al-Qadsiah – 2018–19, 2020–21

== Austria ==
- Thomas Murg – Al-Khaleej – 2024–25

== Bahrain ==
- Saleh Abdulhameed – Al-Raed – 2008–09
- Ismail Abdullatif – Al-Nahda – 2013–14
- Abdulwahab Al-Safi – Al-Qadsiah – 2011–12
- Hussain Baba – Al-Shabab, Al-Wehda, Al-Fateh – 2009–11, 2014–15
- Abdulla Fatadi – Al-Qadsiah, Al-Shoulla – 2010–11, 2012–13
- Mohamed Hubail – Al-Qadsiah – 2009–10
- Mohamed Husain – Al-Nassr – 2012–16
- Abdullah Omar – Al-Ittihad – 2011–12

== Belarus ==
- Nikita Korzun – Al-Fateh – 2018–19

== Belgium ==
- Dino Arslanagić – Al-Riyadh – 2023–24
- **Michy Batshuayi** – **Abha** – 2026–
- **Yannick Carrasco** – **Al-Shabab** – 2023–
- **Koen Casteels** – **Al-Qadsiah** – 2024–
- Gaëtan Coucke – Al-Orobah – 2024–25
- **Matteo Dams** – **Al-Ahli** – 2024–
- Jason Denayer – Al-Fateh – 2023–25
- Yassine El Ghanassy – Al-Raed – 2018–19
- Ilombe Mboyo – Al-Raed – 2018–19

== Benin ==
- Khaled Adénon – Al-Wehda – 2019–20
- Razak Omotoyossi – Al-Nassr – 2008–09

== Bolivia ==
- Gilbert Álvarez – Al-Hazem – 2018–19
- Jhasmani Campos – Al-Orobah – 2014–15
- Lucas Chávez – Al-Taawoun – 2024–25
- Yasmani Duk – Al-Ettifaq – 2016–17
- Gualberto Mojica – Hajer – 2015–16
- Ronald Raldes – Al-Hilal – 2008–09

== Bosnia and Herzegovina ==
- Gojko Cimirot – Al-Fayha – 2023–25
- Elvis Sarić – Al-Ahli – 2019–21
- Asim Šehić – Al-Faisaly – 2011–12
- Ibrahim Šehić – Al-Khaleej – 2023–25
- Enes Sipović – Ohod – 2018–19
- Benjamin Tatar – Abha – 2020–21
- **Nikola Vasilj** – **Al-Diriyah** – 2026–
- Ervin Zukanović – Al-Ahli – 2019–20

== Brazil ==
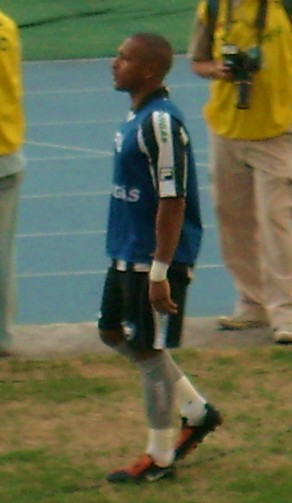
Victor Simões was the joint top scorer in the 2011–12 season, with 21 goals.

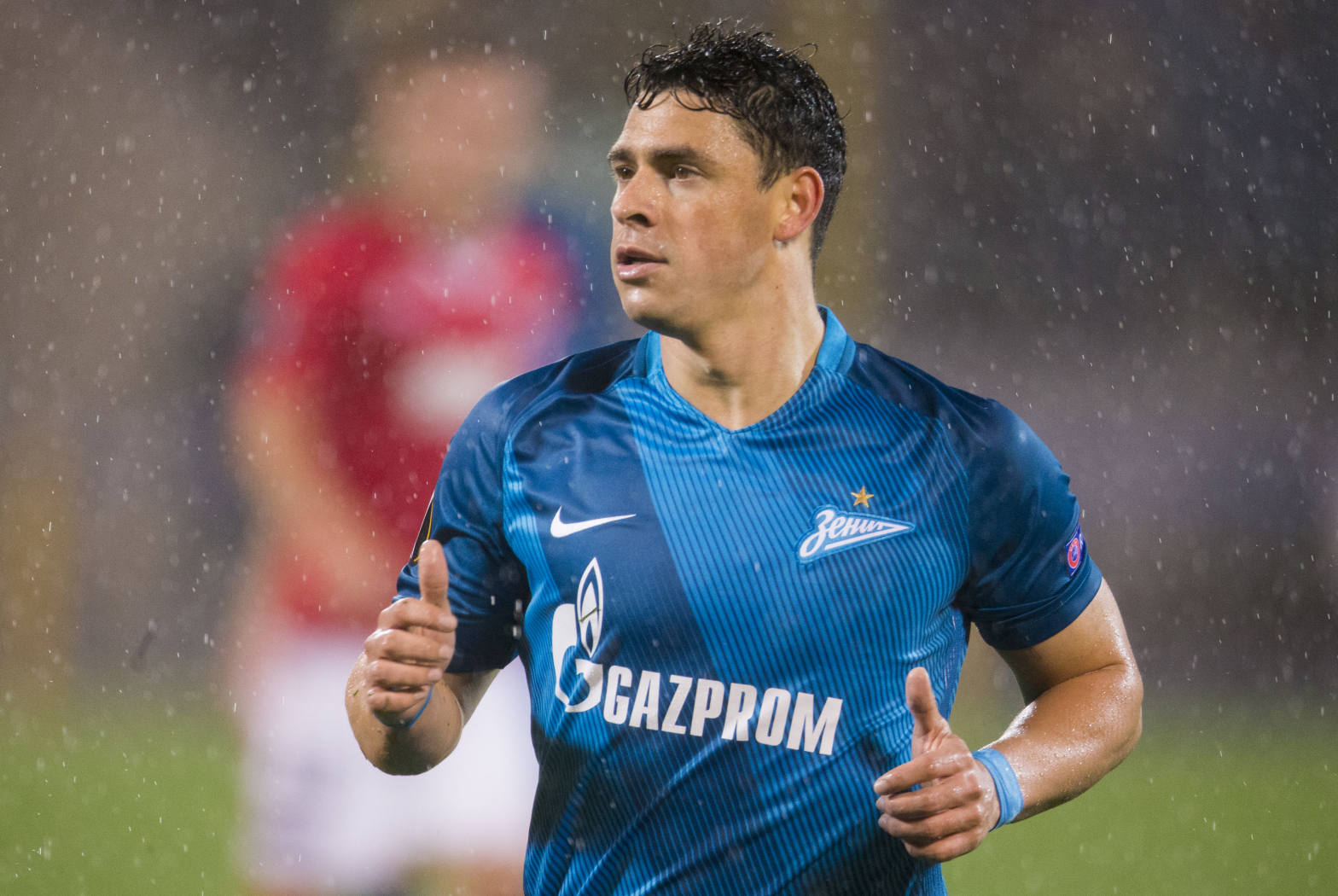
Giuliano won the Pro League with Al-Nassr in 2018–19

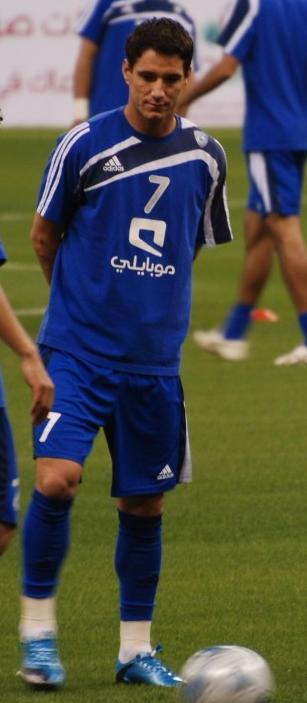
Thiago Neves won two Pro League titles with Al-Hilal

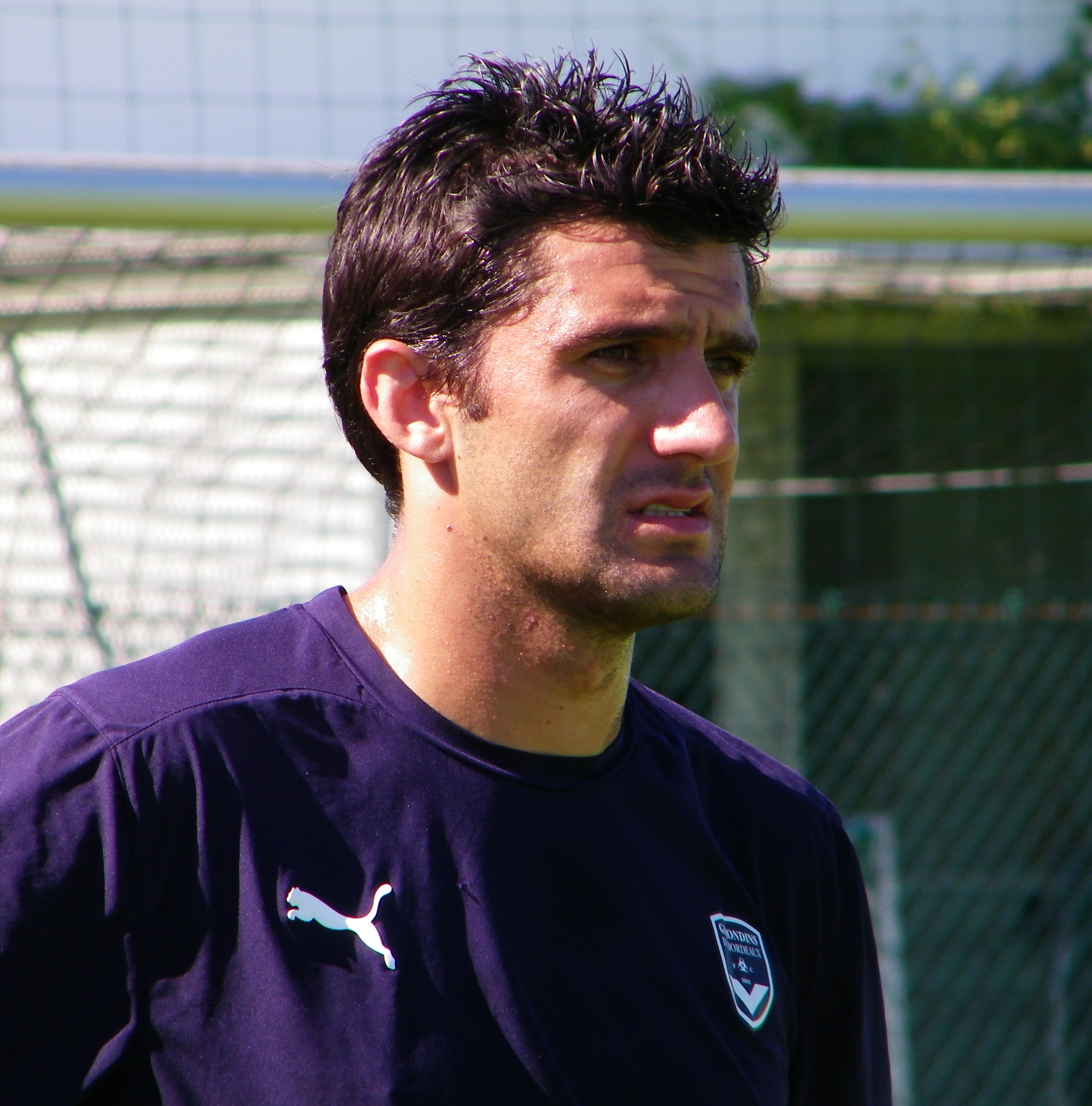
Fernando Menegazzo won the Pro League with Al-Shabab in 2011–12

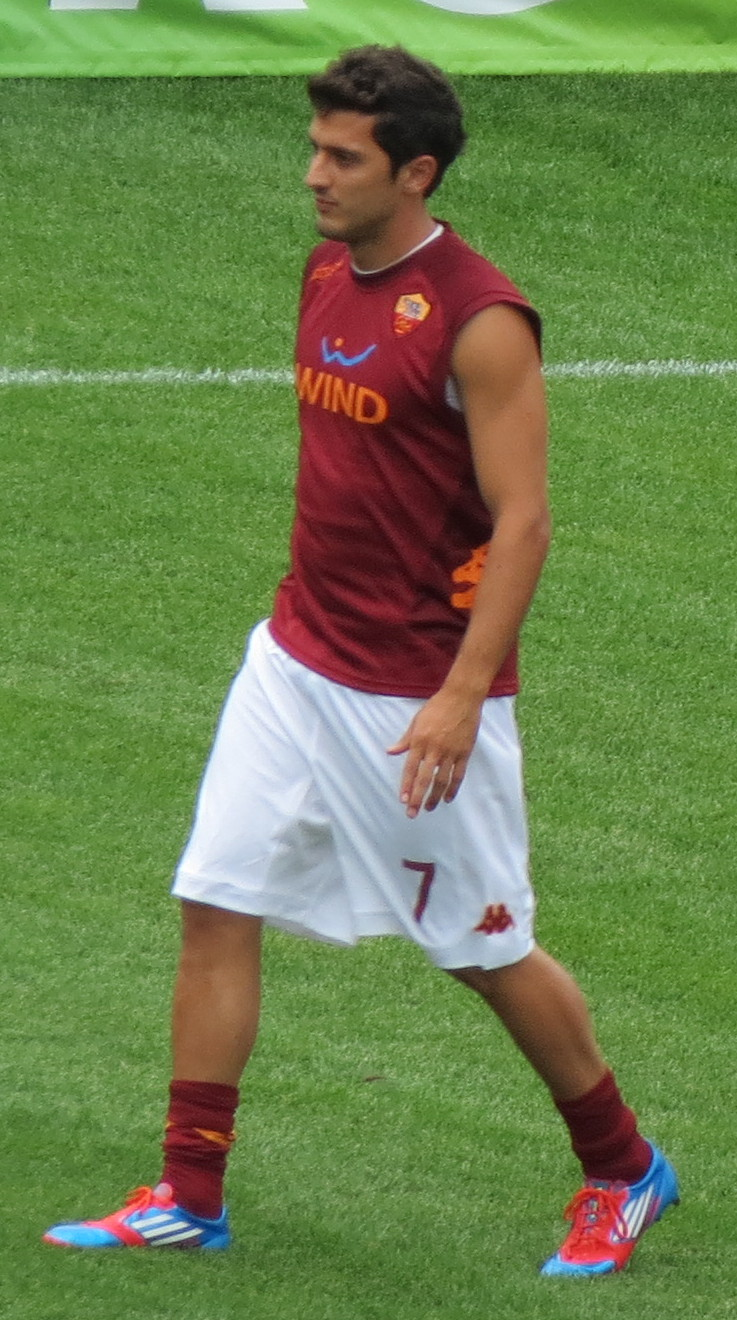
Marquinho won the Pro League with Al-Ahli in 2015–16. He also played for Al-Ittihad during the 2014–15 season.

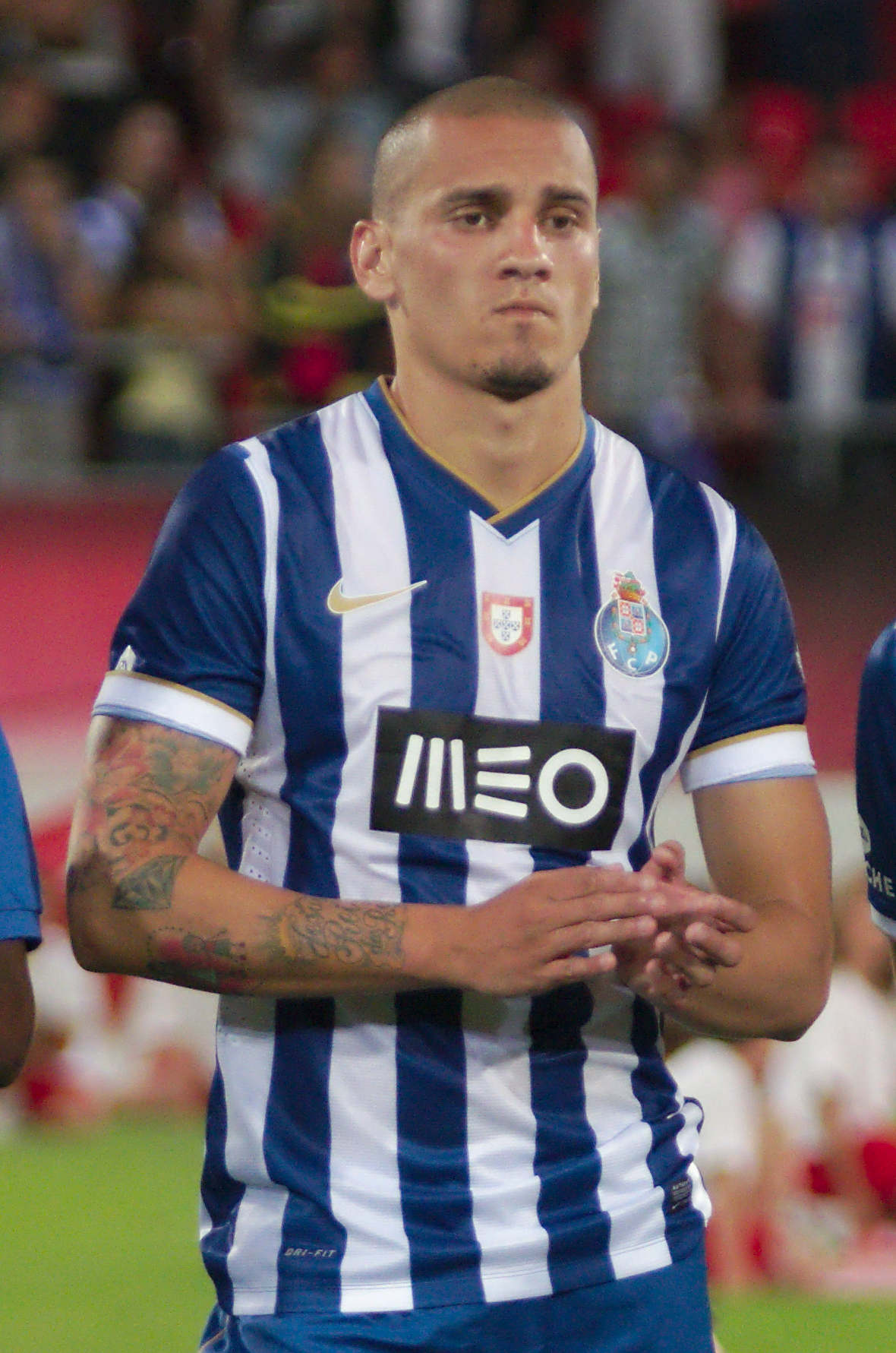
Maicon won the Pro League with Al-Nassr in 2018–19

- Adriano – Najran, Al-Raed – 2015–17
- Aílton – Al-Hilal – 2015–16
- Alemão Berger – Al-Faisaly – 2016–17
- Alemão Fagner – Al-Hazem – 2018–20
- Alexsander – Al-Ahli – 2024–25
- Alison – Al-Hazem – 2021–22
- Aloísio – Hajer – 2014–15
- Daniel Amora – Al-Raed – 2016–19
- Andrezinho – Al-Shoulla – 2014–15
- **Ângelo Gabriel** – **Al-Nassr** – 2024–
- Anselmo – Al-Wehda, Al-Nassr – 2018–24
- Maurício Antônio – Al-Batin – 2021–23
- Apodi – Ohod – 2018–19
- Arielson – Damac – 2025–26
- Rafael Assis – Al-Fayha – 2019–20
- Filipe Augusto – Damac – 2021–22
- Fernando Baiano – Al-Ittihad – 2013–14
- Baraka – Al-Batin – 2018–19
- Jonatas Belusso – Al-Shabab – 2017–18
- **Bento** – **Al-Nassr** – 2024–
- Bill – Al-Ittihad – 2012–13
- Bismark – Najran, Al-Qadsiah – 2015–19
- Léo Bonatini – Al-Hilal – 2016–17
- Leandro Bonfim – Al-Ittihad – 2013–14
- Ricardo Bóvio – Al-Shabab – 2008–09
- Victor Braga – Al-Tai, Al-Najma – 2022–24, 2025–26
- Jonathan Cafú – Al-Hazem – 2019–20
- Arthur Caíke – Al-Shabab – 2018–19
- Marcelo Camacho – Al-Shabab, Al-Ahli – 2008–13
- Camilo – Al-Shabab – 2015–16
- Felippe Cardoso – Al-Najma – 2025–26
- Thiago Carleto – Al-Ittihad – 2018–19
- **Carlos Júnior** – **Al-Shabab** – 2021–24, 2025–
- Carlos Santos – Al-Ettifaq – 2011–13
- **Gabriel Carvalho** – **Al-Qadsiah** – 2025–
- Cássio Anjos – Al-Taawoun – 2018–22
- Cássio Vargas – Al-Ettifaq – 2012–13
- Mateus Castro – Al-Taawoun – 2023–25
- Bruno César – Al-Ahli – 2012–15
- Charles – Al-Raed – 2010–12
- Claudemir – Al-Ahli – 2017–18
- Clayson – Al-Faisaly – 2021–22
- Jhon Cley – Al-Qadsiah – 2015–16
- Igor Coronado – Al-Ittihad – 2021–24
- Crysan – Al-Batin – 2018–19
- Dankler – Al-Ahli – 2021–22
- David Kaiki – Damac – 2025–26
- Dener – Al-Tai – 2021–23
- Denílson – Al-Faisaly – 2018–19
- Digão – Al-Hilal – 2013–16
- Bruno Duarte – Damac – 2022–23
- Dudu – Ohod – 2017–18
- Edson – Al-Qadsiah, Al-Adalah – 2020–21, 2022–23
- Carlos Eduardo – Al-Hilal, Al-Ahli – 2015–20, 2021–22
- Elias – Al-Fateh – 2014–15
- Élton Brandão – Al-Nassr – 2013–14
- Élton José – Al-Nassr, Al-Fateh, Al-Qadsiah, Al-Wehda – 2008–09, 2011–20
- Euller – Al-Shabab – 2018–19
- Everaldo – Al-Faisaly – 2016–17
- Everton – Al-Nassr – 2013–14
- Fabinho – Al-Ittihad – 2023–26
- Adriano Facchini – Al-Batin – 2018–19
- Farley – Al-Ettifaq – 2018–19
- Felipe – Al-Raed, Al-Wehda – 2008–11
- Jorge Fellipe – Damac – 2019–20
- Eli Felton – Al-Wehda – 2009–10
- Fernandão – Al-Wehda – 2018–19
- Fernando Andrade – Al-Fayha – 2021–22
- Fernando Gabriel – Al-Faisaly – 2015–16
- Diego Ferreira – Al-Okhdood – 2024–25
- Roberto Firmino – Al-Ahli – 2023–25
- **Flávio** – Al-Taawoun, **Al-Faisaly** – 2022–
- Douglas Friedrich – Al-Khaleej – 2022–23
- Marquinhos Gabriel – Al-Nassr – 2014–16
- **Galeno** – **Al-Ahli** – 2024–
- Éder Gaúcho – Al-Nassr – 2008–10
- Getterson – Al-Ain – 2020–21
- Gilmar – Al-Raed – 2016–17
- **Andrei Girotto** – Al-Taawoun, **Al-Faisaly** – 2023–
- Giuliano – Al-Nassr – 2018–20
- **Matheus Gonçalves** – **Al-Ahli** – 2025–
- Marcelo Grohe – Al-Ittihad, Al-Kholood – 2019–25
- **Guga** – Al-Qadsiah, **Al-Kholood** – 2024–
- Guilherme Augusto – Al-Faisaly – 2019–22
- Guilherme Schettine – Al-Batin – 2017–18
- Marcos Guilherme – Al-Wehda – 2018–20
- Luiz Gustavo – Al-Nassr – 2022–23
- Harison – Al-Ahli, Al-Wehda – 2008–09
- Heberty – Al-Shabab – 2016–17
- Bruno Henrique – Al-Ittihad – 2020–23
- Eduardo Henrique – Al-Raed – 2021–22
- Hernane – Al-Nassr – 2014–15
- **Roger Ibañez** – **Al-Ahli** – 2023–
- Ismael – Al-Faisaly – 2021–22
- Iury – Al-Fayha – 2018–19
- Jandson – Najran, Al-Qadsiah, Al-Khaleej – 2013–17
- Jhonnattann – Al-Batin, Al-Taawoun – 2016–19
- Jildemar – Hajer – 2014–15
- João Gabriel – Al-Batin – 2018–19
- João Guilherme – Al-Fateh – 2016–17
- João Pedro – Al-Fateh, Al-Taawoun – 2017–19, 2023–25
- Jóbson – Al-Ittihad – 2013–14
- Jonas – Al-Ittihad – 2018–20
- Jorge Santos – Al-Batin, Al-Qadsiah – 2016–19
- Jorginho – Al-Qadsiah – 2017–19
- Josimar Roberto – Al-Fateh – 2015–16
- Josimar Tavares – Al-Watani – 2008–09
- **Kaio César** – **Al-Hilal** – 2024–
- Lucas Kal – Al-Riyadh – 2024–25
- Kanu – Al-Raed – 2018–19
- Kewin – Damac – 2025–26
- **Lázaro** – Al-Najma, **Al-Fayha** – 2025–
- Bruno Lazaroni – Al-Ettifaq – 2010–12
- Leandrinho – Al-Shabab – 2024–25
- Leandrinho – Al-Raed – 2011–12
- Leo Alves – Al-Ettifaq – 2016–17
- Leonardo – Al-Nassr – 2017–18
- Leonardo Souza – Al-Ahli – 2017–18
- Renan Lodi – Al-Hilal – 2023–25
- Bruno Lopes – Hajer – 2015–16
- Ramon Lopes – Al-Fayha – 2021–22
- Lucas Araujo – Al-Tai – 2021–22
- Lucas Lima – Al-Ahli – 2019–21
- Lucas Tagliapietra – Al-Batin – 2018–19
- Luisinho – Al-Faisaly, Al-Wehda – 2016–21
- Bruno Luiz – Al-Raed – 2009–10
- Luiz Antônio – Al-Shabab – 2018–19
- Luíz Carlos – Al-Ahli – 2016–17
- Luiz Paulo – Al-Batin – 2017–18
- Gilberto Macena – Al-Qadsiah – 2015–16
- **Matheus Machado** – **Al-Fateh** – 2024–
- Maicon – Al-Nassr – 2018–21
- **Mailson** – **Al-Taawoun** – 2022–
- **Malcom** – **Al-Hilal** – 2023–
- Marcelo Ferreira – Al-Tai – 2021–22
- Marcelo Tavares – Al-Shabab – 2010–12
- Marcinho – Al-Ahli – 2009–11
- Marcos Leonardo – Al-Hilal – 2024–26
- Mário Sérgio – Al-Raed – 2009–10
- Marquinho – Al-Ittihad, Al-Ahli – 2014–16
- **Gabriel Martinelli** – **Al-Hilal** – 2026–
- Mateus Barbosa – Al-Ettifaq – 2010–11
- Matheus Gaúcho – Najran – 2013–14
- Diego Maurício – Al-Qadsiah – 2015–16
- Fernando Menegazzo – Al-Shabab – 2011–14
- Michael – Al-Hilal – 2021–24
- Bruno Michel – Ohod – 2018–19
- Juliano Mineiro – Najran – 2010–11
- Danny Morais – Al-Ettifaq – 2013–14
- Morato – Al-Khaleej – 2022–23
- Bruno Moreno – Al-Raed – 2013–14
- Mossoró – Al-Ahli – 2013–14
- **Hugo Moura** – **Al-Fayha** – 2026–
- Muralha – Al-Hazem – 2018–20
- Naldo Oliveira – Al-Fayha – 2018–19
- Naldo Pereira – Al-Taawoun – 2022–23
- Nathan Júnior – Al-Fateh – 2016–17
- Nei – Al-Shabab – 2008–09
- Neris – Al-Hazem – 2021–22
- Ângelo Neto – Al-Fayha – 2019–20
- Thiago Neves – Al-Hilal – 2009–11, 2013–15
- Neymar – Al-Hilal – 2023–24
- Marcelo Nicácio – Al-Faisaly – 2013–14
- Nildo Petrolina – Al-Taawoun – 2018–20
- Nino – Al-Batin – 2016–17
- Anderson Oliveira – Hajer – 2015–16
- Leandro Oliveira – Al-Faisaly – 2013–14
- Orestes – Al-Shoulla – 2014–15
- Osvaldo – Al-Ahli – 2014–15
- Ozéia – Al-Hilal – 2012–13
- Adriano Pardal – Al-Faisaly – 2014–16
- Evson Patrício – Al-Faisaly – 2017–18
- Paulinho Bezerra – Al-Ahli – 2021–22
- Paulinho de Paula – Al-Shabab, Al-Fayha – 2021–23
- Paulo Sérgio Gomes – Al-Ettifaq – 2008–09
- Paulo Sérgio Luiz – Al-Qadsiah – 2017–18
- Eric Pereira – Al-Ahli, Najran – 2013–14, 2015–16
- Matheus Pereira – Al-Hilal – 2021–23
- Pedro Henrique – Al-Wehda – 2020–21
- Petros – Al-Nassr, Al-Fateh, Al-Okhdood – 2018–26
- Samuel Portugal – Al-Okhdood – 2025–26
- Rafael Barbosa – Hajer – 2011–12
- Rafael Barreto – Al-Wehda – 2016–17
- Rafael Bastos – Al-Nassr – 2012–14
- Rafael Costa – Damac – 2019–20
- Rafinha – Al-Shabab – 2013–16
- Rangel – Al-Fayha – 2024–25
- Reinaldo Mineiro – Al-Raed – 2011–12
- Reinaldo da Silva – Al-Faisaly – 2014–15
- Robert Renan – Al-Shabab – 2024–25
- Renato Cajá – Al-Ittihad – 2008–09
- Renato Chaves – Al-Wehda, Al-Batin – 2018–22
- Ribamar – Ohod – 2018–19
- Paulo Ricardo – Al-Hazem – 2023–24
- **Ricardo Mathias** – Al-Ahli, **Al-Shabab** – 2025–
- Rico – Hajer – 2011–12
- Rodolfo – Al-Hazem – 2018–19
- Rogerinho – Al-Shabab, Al-Faisaly, Al-Ettifaq – 2013–14, 2017–20
- Romarinho – Al-Ittihad – 2018–24
- Ronaldo – Ohod – 2017–18
- Igor Rossi – Al-Faisaly – 2016–22
- Rossi Pereira – Al-Faisaly – 2021–22
- Rubinho – Al-Qadsiah – 2015–16
- Ricardo Ryller – Al-Fayha – 2021–24
- Eli Sabiá – Al-Raed – 2017–18
- Samir – Al-Najma – 2025–26
- Sandro Manoel – Al-Taawoun, Al-Fateh – 2015–22
- Aderlan Santos – Al-Ahli – 2018–19
- Iago Santos – Al-Taawoun, Al-Shabab – 2020–24
- Pablo Santos – Al-Raed – 2022–23
- René Santos – Al-Raed – 2021–23
- Sebá – Al-Shabab – 2018–22
- Sérgio Ricardo – Al-Raed – 2009–10
- Leandro Sena – Al-Raed – 2008–09
- Raphael Silva – Al-Faisaly – 2019–22
- Renan Silva – Al-Nahda – 2013–14
- Victor Simões – Al-Ahli – 2009–14
- Somália – Al-Shabab – 2018–20
- **Sorriso** – **Al-Fateh** – 2026–
- Diego Souza – Al-Ittihad – 2012–13
- Elierce Souza – Al-Ettifaq – 2019–22
- Josef Souza – Al-Ahli – 2018–20
- Lucas Souza – Al-Khaleej – 2022–23
- **Yago Souza** – **Al-Fayha** – 2026–
- Talisca – Al-Nassr – 2021–25
- Tarabai – Al-Batin, Al-Raed – 2016–19
- Tatá – Al-Ansar – 2011–12
- Alex Telles – Al-Nassr – 2023–25
- Thiago Gomes – Al-Wehda – 2012–13
- Tiago Alves – Al-Hilal – 2016–17
- Tiago Bezerra – Al-Qadsiah – 2016–17
- Tinga – Al-Batin – 2017–18
- Tozin – Najran – 2015–16
- Bruno Uvini – Al-Nassr, Al-Ittihad – 2016–21
- Valdívia – Al-Ittihad – 2018–19
- Gabriel Vareta – Al-Fayha – 2024–25
- Bruno Viana – Al-Hazem – 2023–24
- Paulo Victor – Al-Ettifaq – 2022–24
- Victor Hugo – Al-Taawoun – 2025–26
- Vina – Al-Hazem – 2023–24
- Vinícius Reche – Al-Nassr, Al-Wehda, Al-Taawoun – 2011–14
- Vinícius da Silva – Najran – 2008–09
- Vitão – Al-Najma – 2025–26
- Vitinho – Al-Ettifaq, Al-Shabab – 2022–25
- Paulo Vítor – Al-Okhdood – 2023–25
- Vitor Júnior – Al-Qadsiah – 2015–16
- Wagner Querino – Al-Nassr – 2011–12
- Wander Luiz – Al-Raed – 2016–18
- Wánderson – Al-Ahli – 2010–11
- Wendel – Al-Ittihad, Al-Shabab – 2011–12
- **Wesley Gassova** – **Al-Nassr** – 2024–
- Wesley Lopes – Al-Hilal – 2012–13
- William Alves Conserva – Al-Batin – 2016–17
- William Alves Oliveira – Al-Faisaly – 2019–20
- Wilson Antônio – Najran – 2008–09
- Xuxa – Al-Raed – 2012–13
- Júnior Xuxa – Al-Ettifaq – 2012–13
- Yago Santos – Al-Qadsiah – 2018–19
- Zé Eduardo – Al-Faisaly – 2017–18

== Bulgaria ==
- Martin Lukov – Al-Tai – 2021–22
- **Marin Petkov** – **Al-Taawoun** – 2025–

== Burkina Faso ==
- Haron Eisa – Ohod – 2018–19
- Boubacar Kébé – Al-Raed – 2015–16
- Mohamed Koffi – Al-Ettifaq – 2016–17
- Mohamed Konaté – Al-Riyadh – 2024–25
- Michaïlou Dramé – Najran – 2014–15
- Moussa Yedan – Al-Orobah – 2014–15

== Burundi ==
- Cédric Amissi – Al-Taawoun – 2017–22

== Cameroon ==
- Vincent Aboubakar – Al-Nassr – 2021–23
- Paul Alo'o – Al-Taawoun – 2013–16
- Jean Bapidi – Al-Orobah – 2013–14
- **Christian Bassogog** – Al-Okhdood, **Al-Faisaly** – 2024–
- Aminou Bouba – Al-Khaleej, Al-Ettifaq – 2014–17
- Arnaud Djoum – Al-Raed – 2019–21
- Charles Edoa – Al-Orobah – 2013–14
- Achille Emaná – Al-Hilal – 2011–12
- Alexis Enam – Al-Raed – 2013–15
- Devis Epassy – Abha – 2022–24
- **Antoin Essomba** – **Al-Kholood** – 2026–
- Collins Fai – Al-Tai – 2021–23
- Oumar Gonzalez – Al-Raed – 2023–25
- **Stephane Keller** – **Al-Ittihad** – 2026–
- Franck Kom – Al-Ahli – 2021–22
- Modeste M'bami – Al-Ittihad – 2012–13
- John Mary – Al-Shabab – 2021–22
- Moustapha Moctar – Hajer – 2011–13
- André Ndame Ndame – Al-Faisaly, Hajer – 2014–16
- Yvan Neyou – Al-Okhdood – 2025–26
- Ernest Nfor – Al-Wehda – 2015–16
- **Georges-Kévin Nkoudou** – Damac, Al-Diriyah, **Abha** – 2023–25, 2026–
- Aboubakar Oumarou – Al-Qadsiah – 2018–19
- Léandre Tawamba – Al-Taawoun, Al-Okhdood – 2018–24
- Adolphe Teikeu – Ohod – 2018–19
- Karl Toko Ekambi – Abha, Al-Ettifaq, Al-Fateh – 2023–26

== Canada ==
- **Milan Borjan** – **Al-Riyadh** – 2024–

== Cape Verde ==
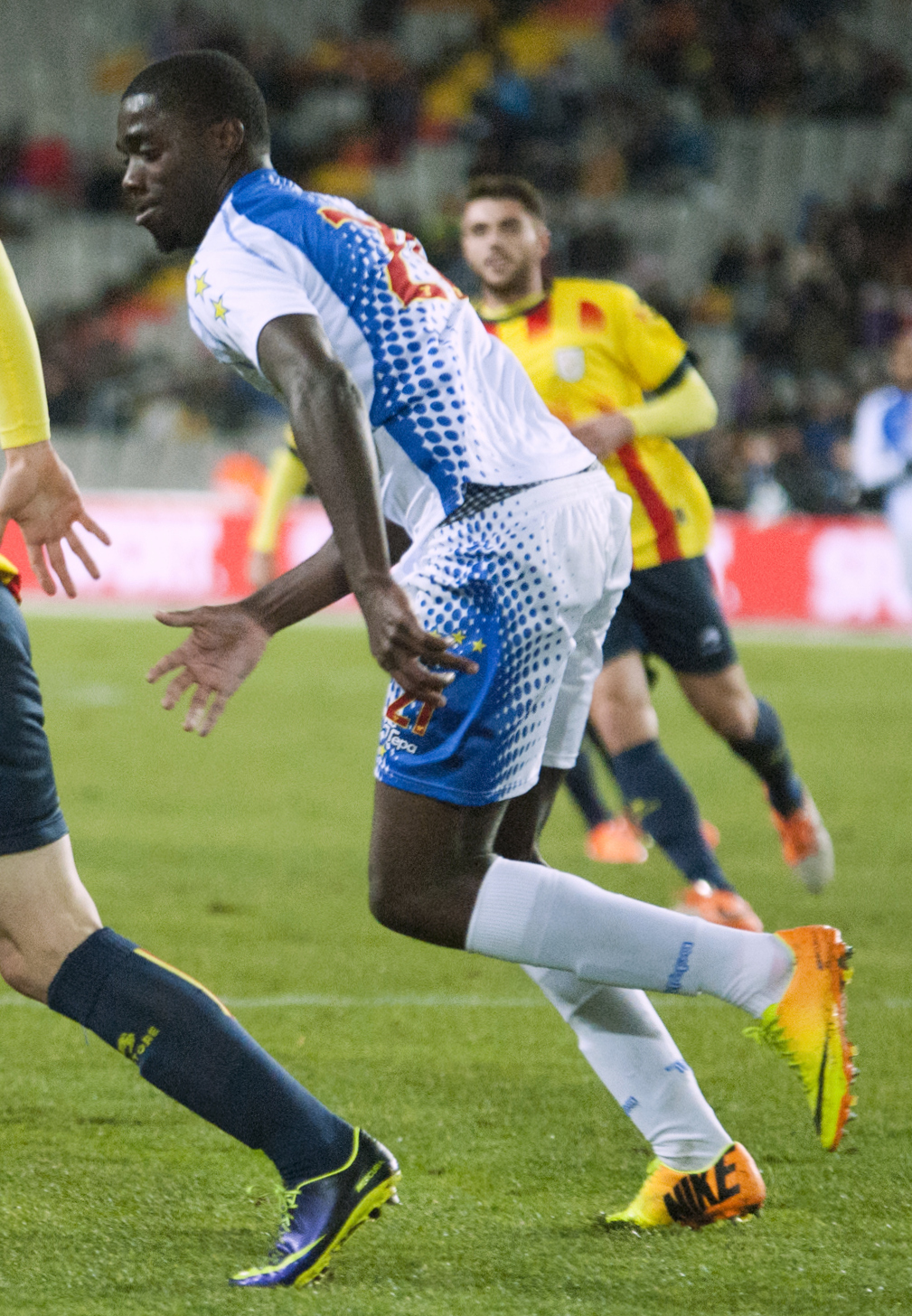
Djaniny currently holds the record for most goals scored in a single match. He scored five goals against Ohod on 11 January 2019.

- **Wesley Delgado** – **Al-Fateh** – 2025–
- Djaniny – Al-Ahli, Al-Fateh – 2018–20, 2023–25
- Gegé – Al-Fayha – 2017–20
- Héldon – Al-Taawoun – 2018–20
- **Jefferson Ramos** – **Al-Fateh** – 2025–
- Garry Rodrigues – Al-Ittihad – 2018–19, 2020–22
- Júlio Tavares – Al-Faisaly, Al-Raed – 2020–24
- **Bruno Varela** – **Al-Hazem** – 2025–
- **Diogo Wilson** – **Al-Khaleej** – 2026–
- Zé Luís – Al-Taawoun – 2021–22

== Central African Republic ==
- Eudes Dagoulou – Al-Wehda – 2016–17
- Vianney Mabidé – Al-Taawoun – 2011–12
- Cédric Yambéré – Al-Ettifaq – 2019–20

== Chad ==
- Othman Alhaj – Al-Ahli, Al-Fayha – 2018–21
- Maher Sharoma – Al-Adalah, Al-Ettifaq – 2019–20

== Chile ==
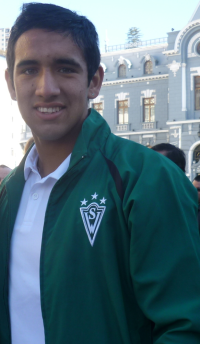
Ronnie Fernández was the top scorer in 2017–18 with 13 goals.

- Claudio Baeza – Al-Ahli – 2018–19
- Paulo Díaz – Al-Ahli – 2018–19
- Ronnie Fernández – Al-Fayha, Al-Raed – 2017–21
- Luis Jiménez – Al-Ittihad – 2019–20
- Igor Lichnovsky – Al-Shabab – 2020–22
- Enzo Roco – Al-Tai – 2023–24
- Sebastián Ubilla – Al-Shabab – 2017–18
- Carlos Villanueva – Al-Ittihad, Al-Fayha – 2016–20

== Colombia ==
- Johan Arango – Al-Batin – 2018–19
- Danilo Asprilla – Al-Fayha, Al-Shabab, Al-Qadsiah – 2017–21
- Gustavo Bolívar – Al-Hilal – 2012–13
- Cristian Bonilla – Al-Fayha – 2018–19
- Diego Caicedo – Al-Faisaly – 2018–19
- Gustavo Cuéllar – Al-Hilal, Al-Shabab – 2019–25
- Jhon Durán – Al-Nassr – 2024–25
- Josen Escobar – Al-Ettifaq – 2024–25
- Reinaldo Lenis – Al-Adalah – 2022–23
- **Roger Martínez** – Al-Taawoun, **Al-Shabab** – 2024–
- Josimar Mosquera – Al-Ahli – 2009–10
- David Ospina – Al-Nassr – 2022–24
- Jhon Pajoy – Al-Hazem – 2018–19
- Ezequiel Palomeque – Al-Raed – 2019–20
- Jairo Palomino – Al-Ahli – 2011–13, 2014–15
- Sebastian Pedroza – Al-Batin, Al-Okhdood – 2022–26
- Marco Pérez – Al-Raed – 2019–20
- Juan Pablo Pino – Al-Nassr – 2011–12
- Anderson Plata – Al-Adalah – 2022–23
- Brayan Riascos – Al-Khaleej – 2022–23
- Misael Riascos – Al-Batin – 2018–19
- **Richard Ríos** – **Al-Ittihad** – 2026–
- Andrés Felipe Roa – Al-Batin – 2022–23
- Macnelly Torres – Al-Shabab – 2013–14

== Comoros ==
- Kassim Abdallah – Al-Raed – 2017–18
- Myziane Maolida – Al-Kholood – 2024–26
- Faïz Selemani – Al-Hazem, Al-Riyadh – 2023–25
- **Zaydou Youssouf** – **Al-Fateh** – 2024–

== Congo (Republic of the Congo) ==
- **Silvère Ganvoula** – **Al-Fayha** – 2025–
- Guy Mbenza – Al-Tai – 2022–23
- Prestige Mboungou – Abha – 2021–23
- Fabrice Ondama – Al-Ittihad – 2011–12

== Costa Rica ==
- Francisco Calvo – Al-Ettifaq – 2025–26
- Óscar Duarte – Al-Wehda – 2022–24
- John Jairo Ruiz – Al-Fayha – 2017–19

== Croatia ==
- Domagoj Antolić – Damac – 2020–24
- Leon Benko – Al-Faisaly – 2011–12
- Filip Bradarić – Al-Ain, Al-Ahli – 2020–22
- Marcelo Brozović – Al-Nassr – 2023–26
- Mijo Caktaš – Damac – 2021–22
- Damjan Đoković – Al-Raed – 2022–23
- Marko Dugandžić – Al-Tai – 2023–24
- **Tin Jedvaj** – **Al-Shabab** – 2026–
- Dario Jertec – Al-Faisaly, Al-Taawoun, Hajer – 2010–13, 2014–15
- Martin Maloča – Al-Faisaly – 2016–17
- Karlo Muhar – Al-Orobah – 2024–25
- Pero Pejić – Al-Faisaly – 2011–12
- Marin Prekodravac – Al-Najma – 2025–26
- Ante Puljić – Al-Faisaly – 2018–19
- Ivan Rakitić – Al-Shabab – 2023–24
- Ivan Santini – Al-Fateh – 2021–22
- **Adrian Šemper** – **Al-Fateh** – 2026–
- Ahmad Sharbini – Al-Wehda – 2012–13
- Anas Sharbini – Al-Ittihad – 2012–13
- Marin Tomasov – Al-Nassr – 2016–17
- Ivan Tomečak – Al-Nassr – 2016–17

== Curaçao ==
Until 2010 Netherlands Antilles

- Juninho Bacuna – Al-Wehda – 2024–25
- Roly Bonevacia – Al-Faisaly – 2019–20
- **Juriën Gaari** – **Abha** – 2026–

== Cyprus ==
- Stylianos Vrontis – Al-Fayha – 2025–26

== Denmark ==
- Bashkim Kadrii – Al-Fateh – 2019–20

== DR Congo (Democratic Republic of the Congo) ==
- **Théo Bongonda** – **Al-Faisaly** – 2026–
- André Bukia – Al-Batin – 2022–23
- Yves Diba Ilunga – Najran, Al-Raed – 2009–13
- Doris Fuakumputu – Al-Fateh – 2010–15
- Junior Kabananga – Al-Nassr – 2017–18
- Kabongo Kasongo – Al-Wehda – 2018–19
- Christian Luyindama – Al-Taawoun – 2021–22
- **Chancel Mbemba** – **Al-Diriyah** – 2026–
- Jackson Muleka – Al-Kholood – 2024–25
- Jonathan Okita – Damac – 2025–26
- **Afimico Pululu** – **Al-Hazem** – 2026–
- Marcel Tisserand – Al-Ettifaq, Abha, Al-Khaleej – 2022–25
- Nzuzi Toko – Al-Fateh – 2018–19

== Ecuador ==
- Jaime Ayoví – Al-Nassr – 2012–13
- Felipe Caicedo – Abha – 2022–23
- Segundo Castillo – Al-Hilal – 2013–14
- Carlos Feraud – Al-Hazem – 2018–19
- Armando Wila – Al-Nassr – 2014–15
- **Cristhoper Zambrano** – **Al-Taawoun** – 2025–

== Egypt ==
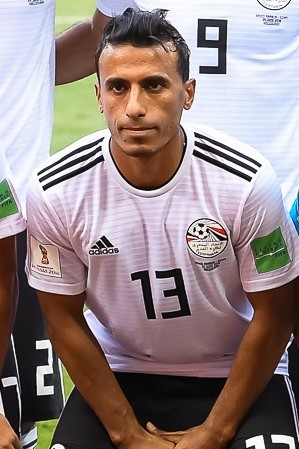
Mohamed Abdel Shafy won the League once with Al-Ahli in 2015–16.

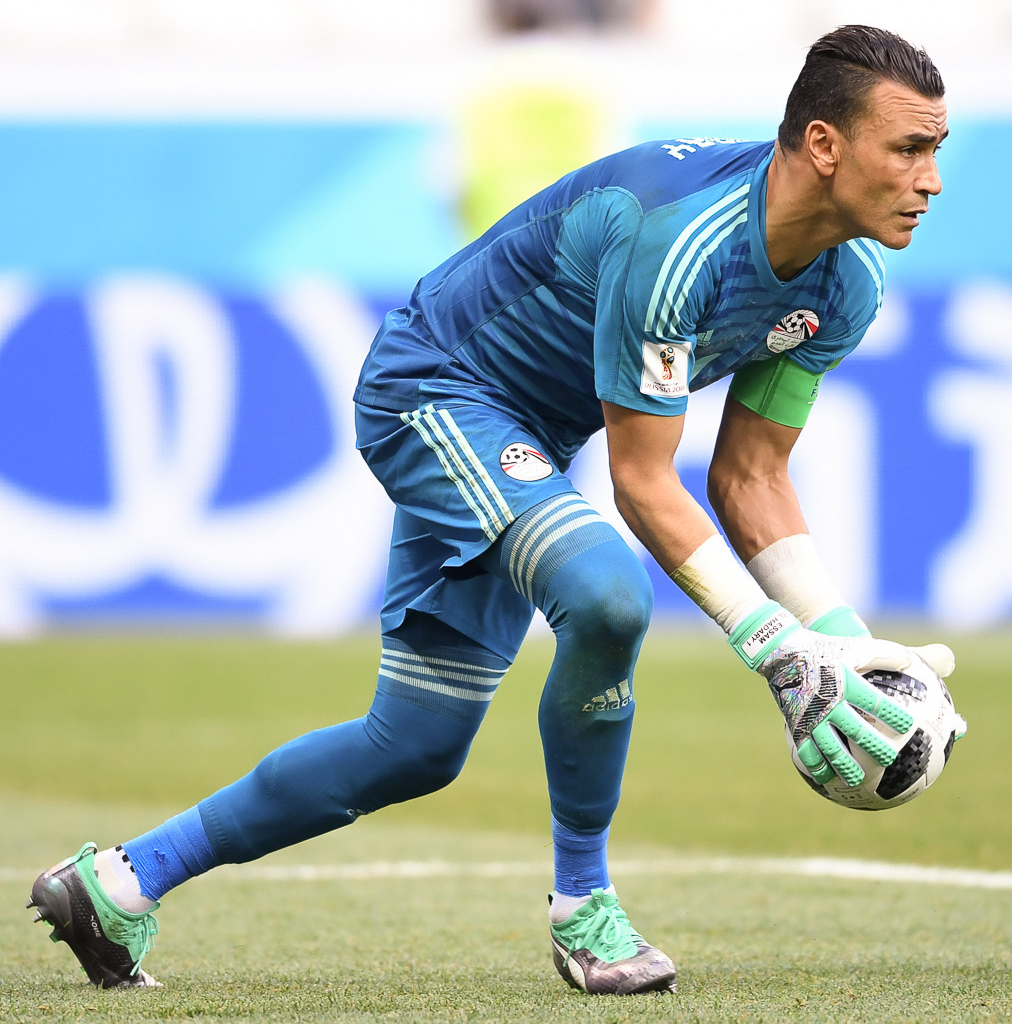
In June 2017, Essam El Hadary became the first foreign goalkeeper to sign for a Saudi Arabian club.

- Hosny Abd Rabo – Al-Ittihad, Al-Nassr – 2011–13
- Ayman Abdel-Aziz – Hajer – 2012–13
- Mohamed Abdel Shafy – Al-Ahli, Al-Fateh – 2014–19
- Ahmed Ali – Al-Hilal – 2010–11
- Karim Ashraf – Al-Okhdood – 2024–25
- Mohamed Atwa – Al-Raed – 2017–19
- Mohamed Awad – Al-Wehda – 2018–19
- Amir Azmy – Al-Taawoun – 2010–11
- Ahmed Bakry – Hajer – 2012–13
- Amr Barakat – Al-Shabab – 2017–18
- Ahmed El Geaidy – Al-Fateh – 2021–22
- Essam El Hadary – Al-Taawoun – 2017–18
- Abdallah El Said – Al-Ahli – 2018–19
- Hussein El Sayed – Al-Ettifaq – 2017–19
- Ahmed El Sheikh – Al-Ettifaq – 2017–18
- Nabil Emad – Al-Najma – 2025–26
- Mostafa Fathi – Al-Taawoun – 2017–18, 2021–22
- Mohammad Fouad – Al-Ain – 2020–21
- Hossam Ghaly – Al-Nassr – 2008–10, 2017–18
- Ahmed Gomaa – Ohod – 2018–19
- Saleh Gomaa – Al-Faisaly – 2017–18
- Tarek Hamed – Al-Ittihad, Damac – 2022–25
- Ahmed Hamoudi – Al-Batin – 2016–17
- Ahmed Hassan – Al-Ettifaq – 2025–26
- Sherif Hazem – Al-Wehda – 2016–17
- Ahmed Hegazi – Al-Ittihad, Neom – 2020–24, 2025–26
- Kahraba – Al-Ittihad – 2016–18
- Ahmed Magdy – Al-Wehda – 2016–17
- Ahmed Mostafa – Abha, Al-Adalah, Al-Okhdood – 2019–20, 2023–24
- Emad Moteab – Al-Ittihad, Al-Taawoun – 2008–09, 2017–18
- **Mohamed Refaat** – **Al-Fateh** – 2025–
- Ibrahim Salah – Al-Orobah – 2013–14
- Mohamed Sherif – Al-Khaleej – 2023–25
- Shikabala – Al-Raed – 2017–18
- Walid Soliman – Al-Ahli – 2008–09
- **Trézéguet** – **Al-Riyadh** – 2026–
- Moamen Zakaria – Al-Ahli – 2017–18

== England ==
- Mo Adams – Al-Khaleej – 2023–24
- **Adam Berry** – **Al-Kholood** – 2025–
- **Josh Brownhill** – **Al-Shabab** – 2025–
- **John Buckley** – **Al-Kholood** – 2025–
- Jordan Henderson – Al-Ettifaq – 2023–24
- Chris Smalling – Al-Fayha – 2024–26
- **Ivan Toney** – **Al-Ahli** – 2024–
- **Ollie Watkins** – **Al-Hilal** – 2026–
- Brad Young – Al-Orobah – 2024–25

== Equatorial Guinea ==
- Javier Balboa – Al-Faisaly – 2015–16
- **Omar Mascarell** – **Al-Khaleej** – 2026–

== Eritrea ==
- Ahmed Abdu Jaber – Al-Wehda, Al-Shabab, Abha – 2018–21, 2022–24

== Estonia ==
- Karol Mets – Al-Ettifaq – 2020–21

== Finland ==
- Glen Kamara – Al-Shabab – 2024–25

== France ==
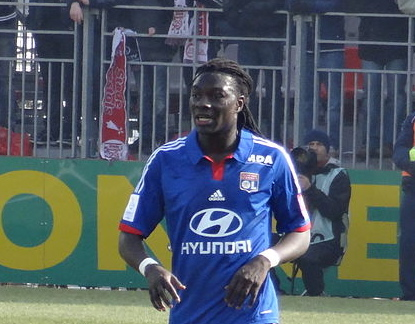
Former France international Bafétimbi Gomis joined Al-Hilal in July 2018

- **Yacine Adli** – **Al-Shabab** – 2025–
- Kodjo Afanou – Al-Hazem – 2008–09
- Nabil Alioui – Damac – 2025–26
- Romain Amalfitano – Al-Faisaly – 2020–22
- **Valentin Atangana** – **Al-Ahli** – 2025–
- **Yoann Barbet** – **Al-Riyadh** – 2024–
- Jean-David Beauguel – Al-Wehda – 2022–23
- **Karim Benzema** – Al-Ittihad, **Al-Hilal** – 2023–
- **Saïmon Bouabré** – Neom, **Al-Hilal** – 2025–
- **Kamil Boumedmed** – **Abha** – 2026–
- Bilal Boutobba – Al-Najma – 2025–26
- **Kingsley Coman** – **Al-Nassr** – 2025–
- **Moussa Dembélé** – **Al-Ettifaq** – 2023–
- **Moussa Diaby** – **Al-Ittihad** – 2024–
- Tristan Dingomé – Al-Fateh – 2022–23
- **Julien Domingues** – **Al-Kholood** – 2026–
- Romain Faivre – Al-Taawoun – 2025–26
- **Nabil Fekir** – **Abha** – 2026–
- Bafétimbi Gomis – Al-Hilal – 2018–22
- Christophe Grondin – Al-Faisaly – 2012–13
- **Théo Hernandez** – **Al-Hilal** – 2025–
- **Jérémie Kanon** – **Al-Fayha** – 2025–
- N'Golo Kanté – Al-Ittihad – 2023–26
- Cédric Kisamba – Najran – 2009–10
- **Gaëtan Laborde** – **Al-Diriyah** – 2026–
- **Alexandre Lacazette** – **Neom** – 2025–
- Sekou Lega – Al-Riyadh – 2024–25
- **Rayane Messi** – Neom, **Al-Ettifaq** – 2025–
- **Enzo Millot** – Al-Ahli, **Al-Diriyah** – 2025–
- Alassane N'Diaye – Al-Taawoun – 2016–17
- Kévin N'Doram – Al-Kholood – 2024–26
- **Teddy Okou** – **Al-Riyadh** – 2025–
- Thibault Peyre – Al-Batin – 2022–23
- **Loreintz Rosier** – Al-Hazem, **Abha** – 2025–
- Abdulfatah Safi – Najran – 2008–09
- Allan Saint-Maximin – Al-Ahli – 2023–24
- **Malang Sarr** – **Neom** – 2026–
- **Mohamed Simakan** – **Al-Nassr** – 2024–
- Mamadou Wagué – Najran – 2015–16
- Karim Yoda – Al-Hazem, Al-Wehda – 2019–20, 2022–23
- **Nathan Zézé** – **Neom** – 2025–
- Kurt Zouma – Al-Orobah – 2024–25

== French Guiana ==
- **Donovan Léon** – **Abha** – 2026–

== Gabon ==
- Pierre-Emerick Aubameyang – Al-Qadsiah – 2024–25
- Medwin Biteghé – Al-Adalah – 2019–20
- Aaron Boupendza – Al-Shabab – 2022–23
- **André-Jordy Ella** – **Al-Faisaly** – 2026–
- Didier Ndong – Al-Riyadh – 2023–24
- André Biyogo Poko – Al-Khaleej – 2022–23

== Gambia (The Gambia) ==
- Muhammed Badamosi – Al-Hazem – 2023–24
- **Musa Barrow** – Al-Taawoun, **Al-Khaleej** – 2023–
- Assan Ceesay – Damac – 2023–24
- **Omar Colley** – Al-Diriyah, **Al-Fayha** – 2026–
- **Abdoulie Mboge** – **Al-Khaleej** – 2025–
- Babucarr Seye – Al-Khaleej – 2024–25
- Kebba Sowe – Al-Kholood – 2024–25
- Bubacarr Trawally – Al-Shabab – 2018–19

== Georgia (Georgia (country)) ==
- Solomon Kvirkvelia – Al-Okhdood – 2023–24
- Zurab Tsiskaridze – Al-Hazem – 2018–19

== Germany ==
- Robert Bauer – Al-Tai – 2023–24
- Gökhan Gül – Al-Okhdood – 2025–26
- Koray Günter – Al-Okhdood – 2025–26
- Marko Marin – Al-Ahli, Al-Raed – 2019–21
- **Julian Weigl** – **Al-Qadsiah** – 2025–
- Amin Younes – Al-Ettifaq – 2021–22

== Ghana ==
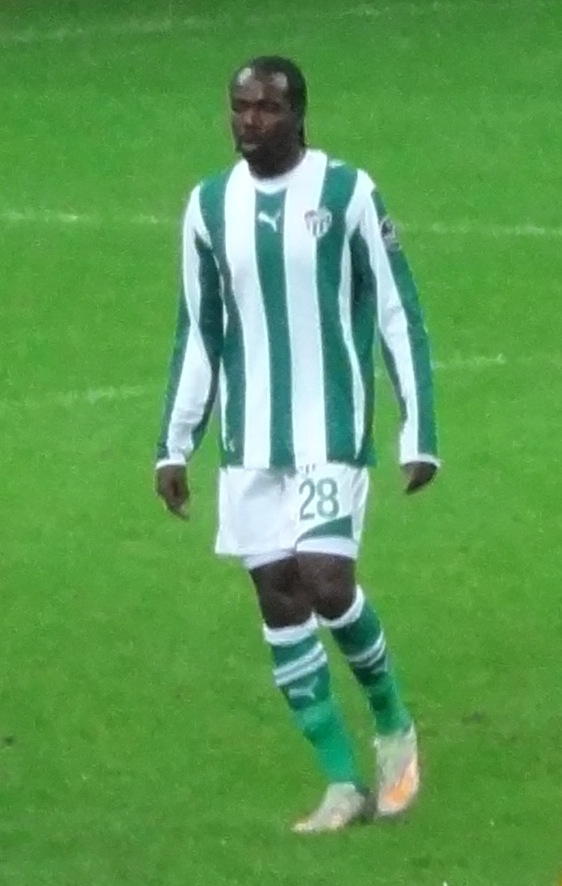
Prince Tagoe spent two seasons with Al-Ettifaq

- Afriyie Acquah – Al-Batin – 2021–22
- Ahmed Adams – Al-Shoulla – 2014–15
- Sadick Adams – Al-Ansar, Al-Nahda – 2011–12, 2013–14
- John Antwi – Al-Shabab – 2014–15
- Ernest Asante – Al-Hazem – 2019–20
- Christian Atsu – Al-Raed – 2021–22
- Godwin Attram – Hajer – 2012–13
- Mohamed Awal – Al-Shabab – 2014–15
- Emmanuel Banahene – Al-Orobah – 2014–15
- Philip Boampong – Al-Shoulla – 2012–13
- Emmanuel Boateng – Al-Orobah – 2024–25
- **Christopher Bonsu Baah** – **Al-Qadsiah** – 2025–
- John Boye – Al-Fayha – 2021–22
- Sadat Bukari – Al-Shoulla – 2014–15
- Winful Cobbinah – Najran – 2014–16
- Mohammed Fatau – Al-Qadsiah – 2017–18
- Abraham Frimpong – Al-Ain – 2020–21
- Torric Jebrin – Al-Wehda – 2016–17
- Abraham Kumedor – Al-Fateh – 2014–15
- **Bernard Mensah** – Al-Tai, **Al-Riyadh** – 2023–25, 2026–
- Salifu Mudasiru – Al-Batin – 2022–23
- Sulley Muntari – Al-Ittihad – 2015–16
- Moussa Narry – Al-Orobah – 2014–15
- Carlos Ohene – Ohod – 2018–19
- Issac Osae – Al-Orobah – 2014–15
- Samuel Owusu – Al-Shoulla – 2014–15
- Samuel Kwame Owusu – Al-Fayha, Al-Ahli – 2019–22
- **Thomas Partey** – **Al-Shabab** – 2026–
- Prince Tagoe – Al-Ettifaq – 2008–09, 2012–13
- William Tiero – Al-Qadsiah – 2011–12
- Isaac Vorsah – Ohod – 2017–18
- Seidu Yahaya – Al-Fayha – 2018–19

== Greece ==
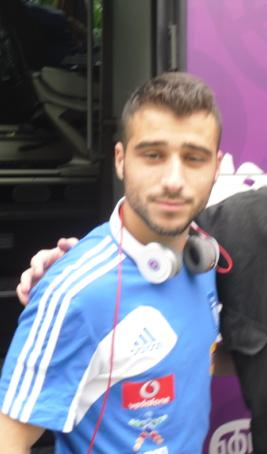
Giannis Fetfatzidis won the Pro League with Al-Ahli during the 2015–16 season.

- Angelos Charisteas – Al-Nassr – 2012–13
- Giannis Fetfatzidis – Al-Ahli – 2015–18
- Kostas Fortounis – Al-Khaleej – 2024–26
- Savvas Gentsoglou – Al-Adalah – 2019–20
- Dimitrios Kourbelis – Al-Khaleej – 2024–26
- **Georgios Masouras** – Al-Khaleej, **Neom** – 2025–
- Kyriakos Papadopoulos – Al-Fayha – 2021–22
- Georgios Samaras – Al-Hilal – 2014–15
- Panagiotis Tachtsidis – Al-Fayha – 2021–23
- Alexandros Tziolis – Al-Fayha – 2017–19

== Guinea ==
- Mamadou Ba Camara – Al-Watani – 2008–09
- **Aboubacar Bah** – **Al-Hazem** – 2025–
- Thierno Bah – Al-Taawoun – 2012–13
- Alkhaly Bangoura – Al-Fateh – 2018–19
- Ismaël Bangoura – Al-Raed, Al-Batin – 2015–19
- Ousmane Barry – Al-Okhdood – 2024–25
- **Mansou Camara** – **Al-Kholood** – 2025–
- **Seydouba Cissé** – **Al-Kholood** – 2026–
- Mousa Conde – Al-Watani – 2008–09
- Mikael Dyrestam – Al-Adalah – 2022–23
- Pascal Feindouno – Al-Nassr – 2009–10
- Boubacar Fofana – Al-Ettifaq, Al-Khaleej – 2016–17
- François Kamano – Abha, Damac – 2023–25
- Ibrahim Kamara – Najran – 2009–10
- Alhassane Keita – Al-Shabab – 2010–11
- **Mory Konaté** – **Al-Hazem** – 2026–
- Naby Soumah – Al-Faisaly, Hajer – 2012–13, 2014–15
- Aboubacar Sylla – Al-Khaleej – 2015–16
- Morlaye Sylla – Damac – 2025–26
- Ibrahim Yattara – Al-Shabab – 2011–12
- Kamil Zayatte – Al-Raed – 2015–16

== Guinea-Bissau ==
- Abel Camará – Al-Faisaly – 2015–16
- **Alexandre Mendy** – **Al-Faisaly** – 2026–
- **Alfa Semedo** – Al-Tai, **Al-Fayha** – 2022–24, 2025–
- Zezinho – Damac – 2019–20

== Honduras ==
- Deiby Flores – Al-Najma – 2025–26
- Emilio Izaguirre – Al-Fayha – 2017–18
- Alexander López – Al-Khaleej – 2016–17
- Romell Quioto – Al-Najma – 2025–26

== Hungary ==
- György Sándor – Al-Ittihad – 2012–13
- Péter Szappanos – Al-Fateh – 2024–25

== Iceland ==
- Jóhann Berg Guðmundsson – Al-Orobah – 2024–25

== Iraq ==
- Saad Abdul-Amir – Al-Qadsiah, Al-Ahli, Al-Shabab – 2015–18
- **Hayder Abdulkareem** – **Al-Nassr** – 2025–
- Ali Adnan – Al-Najma – 2025–26
- Youssef Amyn – Al-Wehda – 2024–25
- Ibrahim Bayesh – Al-Riyadh – 2024–26
- Marwan Hussein – Al-Khaleej – 2015–16
- Ahmad Ibrahim – Al-Ettifaq – 2017–18
- Ali Jasim – Al-Najma – 2025–26
- Younis Mahmoud – Al-Ahli – 2013–14
- Alaa Mhawi – Al-Batin – 2017–18
- Saad Natiq – Abha – 2022–24
- Amjad Radhi – Al-Raed – 2014–16
- Saif Salman – Al-Ittihad, Hajer – 2014–16
- Salam Shaker – Al-Fateh – 2015–16

== Italy ==
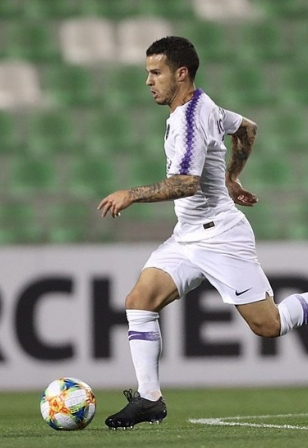
Former Italy international Sebastian Giovinco won two league titles with Al-Hilal.

- Giacomo Bonaventura – Al-Shabab – 2024–25
- Luiz Felipe – Al-Ittihad – 2023–25
- Sebastian Giovinco – Al-Hilal – 2018–21
- **Mateo Retegui** – **Al-Qadsiah** – 2025–

== Ivory Coast ==
- Arnauld Anasse – Al-Faisaly – 2014–15
- Ousmane Bamba – Al-Taawoun – 2010–11
- Wilfried Bony – Al-Ittihad – 2019–20
- Issoumaila Dao – Al-Raed – 2013–14
- Seko Fofana – Al-Nassr, Al-Ettifaq – 2023–25
- Patrick Gbala – Al-Fateh – 2015–17
- **Parfait Guiagon** – **Al-Taawoun** – 2026–
- Hervé Guy – Al-Qadsiah – 2017–19
- Boris Kabi – Al-Raed – 2008–09
- **Wilfried Kanga** – **Al-Fateh** – 2026–
- **Abdoulaye Kanté** – **Al-Ettifaq** – 2026–
- **Kader Keïta** – **Al-Riyadh** – 2026–
- Franck Kessié – Al-Ahli – 2023–26
- Abdoulaye Koffi – Al-Khaleej – 2015–16
- Ghislain Konan – Al-Nassr, Al-Fayha – 2022–24
- Oussou Konan – Hajer – 2012–13
- **Amadou Koné** – **Neom** – 2025–
- Aubin Kouakou – Damac – 2019–20
- Habib Meïté – Al-Nahda, Al-Khaleej – 2013–15
- **Mohamed Kader Meïté** – **Al-Hilal** – 2025–
- Yakou Méïté – Damac – 2025–26
- Sékou Sanogo – Al-Ittihad – 2018–19
- Jean Michaël Seri – Al-Orobah – 2024–25
- Ismaila Soro – Al-Riyadh – 2025–26
- Ben Traoré – Al-Hazem – 2023–24
- Didier Ya Konan – Al-Ittihad – 2014–15

== Jamaica ==
- Andre Gray – Al-Riyadh – 2023–24
- Demarai Gray – Al-Ettifaq – 2023–25
- Damion Lowe – Al-Okhdood – 2024–25

== Jordan ==
- Baha' Abdel-Rahman – Al-Ahli – 2008–09
- Shadi Abu Hash'hash – Al-Taawoun, Al-Fateh – 2010–15
- **Mohannad Abu Taha** – Al-Orobah, **Neom** – 2024–25, 2026–
- Shareef Adnan – Al-Khaleej – 2014–15
- Muath Afaneh – Abha – 2019–22
- Yaseen Al-Bakhit – Al-Taawoun, Al-Faisaly, Al-Ettifaq, Al-Shoulla – 2011–15
- Mohammad Al-Basha – Al-Taawoun – 2012–13
- Hamza Al-Dardour – Najran, Al-Khaleej, Al-Faisaly – 2012–13, 2014–16
- Mohammad Al-Dmeiri – Al-Ittihad – 2014–15
- Mussab Al-Laham – Najran – 2013–15
- Suleiman Al-Salman – Al-Wehda – 2010–11
- Alaa' Al-Shaqran – Hajer – 2014–15
- Ibrahim Al-Zawahreh – Al-Khaleej – 2014–16
- Hatem Aqel – Al-Raed – 2009–11
- Ali Azaizeh – Al-Shabab – 2025–26
- Khalil Bani Attiah – Al-Faisaly – 2013–15
- Anas Bani Yaseen – Najran, Al-Raed – 2009–11, 2014–15
- Bashar Bani Yaseen – Al-Hazem – 2008–10
- Abdallah Deeb – Al-Orobah – 2013–14
- Amer Deeb – Al-Faisaly – 2011–12
- Basem Fathi – Al-Watani – 2008–09
- Hazem Jawdat – Hajer – 2011–13
- Mohammad Khamees – Al-Hazem – 2010–11
- Tareq Khattab – Al-Shabab – 2014–15
- Mohammad Muneer – Al-Ansar – 2011–12
- Mohammad Mustafa – Al-Shoulla – 2013–14
- Amer Shafi – Al-Fayha – 2018–20

== Kazakhstan ==
- Alexander Merkel – Al-Faisaly – 2020–21

== Kenya ==
- David Ochieng – Al-Taawoun – 2013–15

== Korea Republic (South Korea) ==
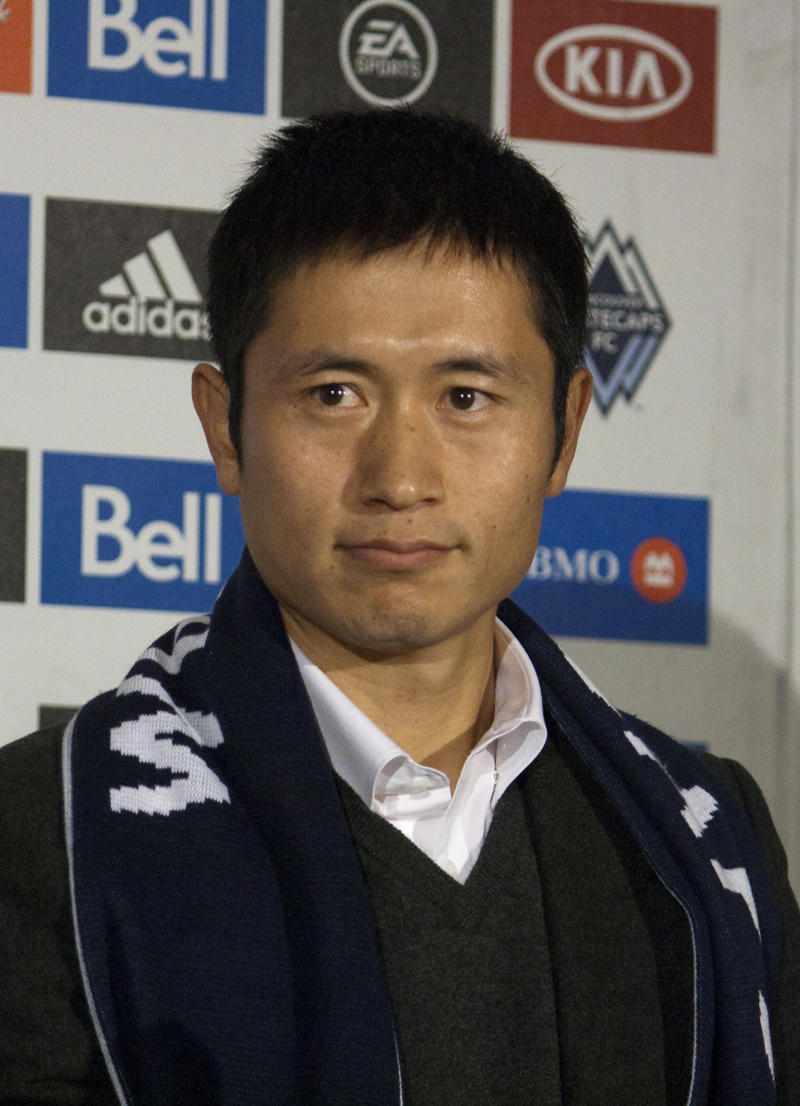
Lee Young-pyo won two Pro League titles with Al-Hilal.

- Cho Sung-hwan – Al-Hilal – 2013–14
- Jang Hyun-soo – Al-Hilal – 2019–23
- Jung Woo-young – Al-Khaleej – 2023–24
- Kim Byung-suk – Al-Nassr – 2011–12
- Kim Jin-su – Al-Nassr – 2020–21
- Kim Seung-gyu – Al-Shabab – 2022–25
- Kwak Tae-hwi – Al-Shabab, Al-Hilal – 2012–16
- Lee Chun-soo – Al-Nassr – 2009–10
- Lee Won-young – Al-Ettifaq – 2011–12
- Lee Young-pyo – Al-Hilal – 2009–11
- Park Chu-young – Al-Shabab – 2014–15
- Seol Ki-hyeon – Al-Hilal – 2008–09
- Song Chong-gug – Al-Shabab – 2010–11
- Suk Hyun-jun – Al-Ahli – 2013–14
- Yoo Byung-soo – Al-Hilal – 2011–13

== Kosovo ==
- **Bersant Celina** – **Al-Ettifaq** – 2026–

== Kuwait ==
- Fahad Al Ansari – Al-Ittihad, Al-Faisaly – 2016–19
- Ahmed Al Dhefiri – Al-Qadsiah – 2016–17
- Fahad Al Enezi – Al-Ittihad – 2011–12
- Fahad Al Hajeri – Al-Ettifaq – 2017–18
- Saif Al Hashan – Al-Shabab – 2015–17
- Bader Al Mutawa – Al-Nassr – 2010–11
- Musaed Neda – Al-Shabab, Al-Orobah – 2010–11, 2014–15
- Faisal Zayid – Najran – 2015–16

== Lebanon ==
- Mohamad Haidar – Al-Ittihad, Al-Fateh – 2013–14
- Khodor Salame – Al-Orobah – 2014–15

== Liberia ==
- **Oscar Dorley** – **Al-Taawoun** – 2026–
- William Jebor – Al-Nassr – 2017–18
- Salomon Tweh – Al-Raed – 2024–25

== Libya ==
- Tarik El Taib – Al-Hilal, Al-Shabab – 2008–10
- Muaid Ellafi – Al-Shabab – 2017–18

== Lithuania ==
- Giedrius Arlauskis – Al-Shabab – 2020–21
- **Edgaras Utkus** – **Al-Kholood** – 2025–

== Luxembourg ==
- **Anthony Moris** – **Al-Khaleej** – 2025–
- Gerson Rodrigues – Al-Wehda – 2022–23

== Madagascar ==
- Carolus Andriamatsinoro – Ohod, Al-Adalah, Al-Qadsiah – 2017–18, 2019–21
- Faneva Andriatsima – Abha, Al-Fayha – 2019–20

== Mali ==
- Sédonoudé Abouta – Al-Raed – 2009–10
- Yaqoub Alhassan – Al-Taawoun – 2021–23
- **Aboubacar Diakité** – **Al-Hazem** – 2026–
- Samba Diakité – Al-Ittihad – 2014–15
- Aliou Dieng – Al-Kholood – 2024–25
- Abdoulaye Doucouré – Neom – 2025–26
- **Mahamadou Doumbia** – **Al-Ittihad** – 2025–
- Sékou Doumbia – Al-Wehda – 2012–13
- Lassana Fané – Al-Shoulla, Al-Batin – 2012–15, 2016–17
- **Alimami Gory** – **Abha** – 2026–
- Eliassou Issiaka – Al-Orobah – 2013–14
- Mamadou Kondo – Al-Shoulla – 2012–14
- Ibrahima Koné – Al-Okhdood – 2024–25
- **Kiki Kouyaté** – **Al-Khaleej** – 2026–
- Modibo Maïga – Al-Nassr – 2015–16
- Moussa Marega – Al-Hilal – 2021–23
- Mamoutou N'Diaye – Ohod – 2017–18
- Youssouf Niakaté – Al-Wehda, Al-Ittihad, Al-Ettifaq – 2019–23
- Aboubacar Tambadou – Najran – 2015–16
- Ibrahima Tandia – Al-Hazem – 2019–20, 2021–22
- Birama Touré – Al-Riyadh – 2023–24
- Adama Traoré – Al-Nahda – 2013–14
- Adama Traoré – Al-Adalah – 2019–20

== Mauritania ==
- Ismaël Diakité – Al-Khaleej – 2016–17
- Souleymane Doukara – Al-Ettifaq – 2019–21

== Mexico ==
- **Julián Quiñones** – **Al-Qadsiah** – 2024–

== Moldova ==
- Henrique Luvannor – Al-Taawoun – 2021–22

== Montenegro ==
- Bojan Božović – Al-Shoulla – 2014–15
- Đorđe Đikanović – Hajer – 2014–15
- Luka Đorđević – Abha – 2023–24
- Milan Mijatović – Al-Adalah – 2022–23

== Morocco ==
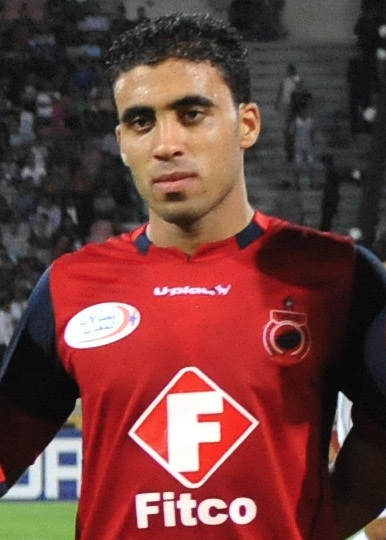
In 2018–19, Abderrazak Hamdallah won the Player of the Year award and was the top scorer with a record breaking 34 goals.

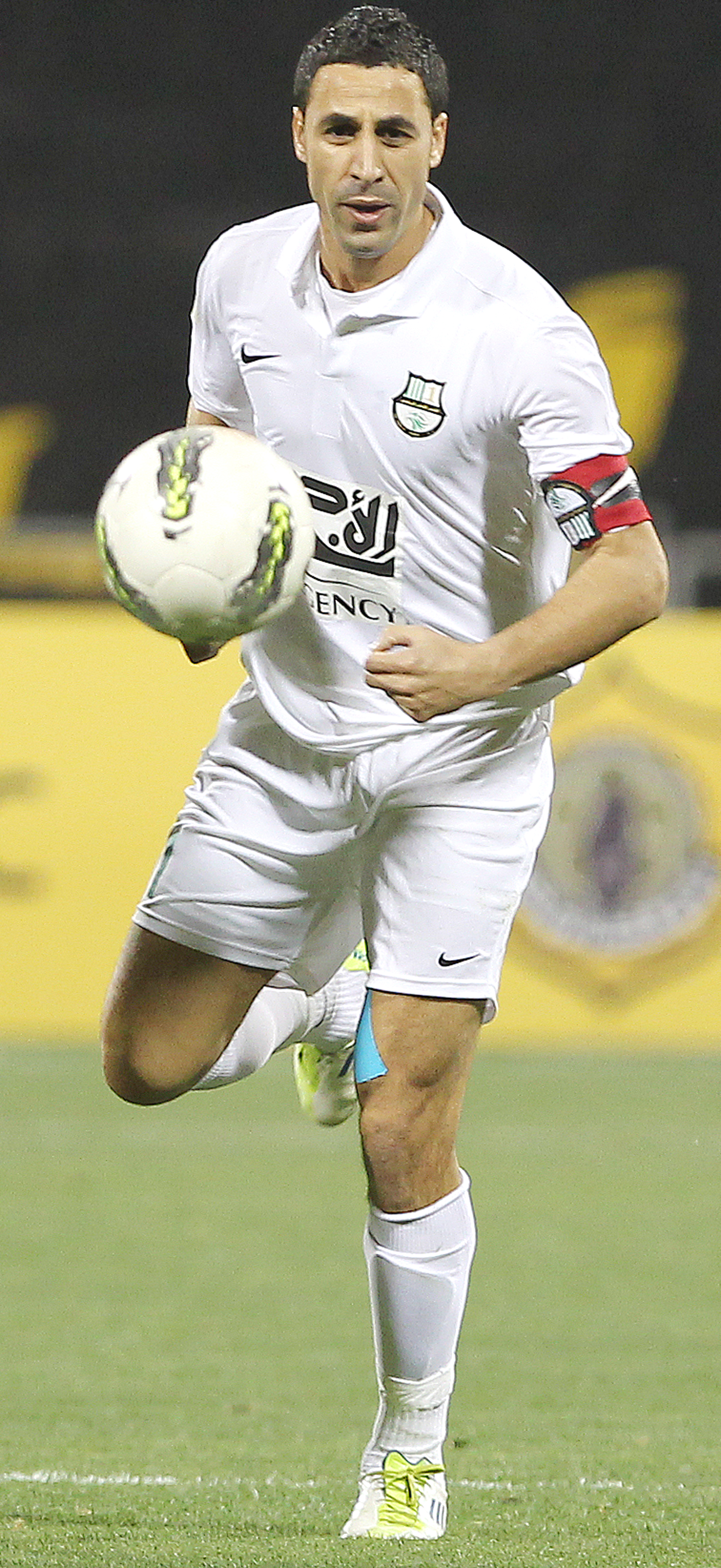
Hicham Aboucherouane was the joint-top goalscorer in the Pro League in 2008–09, scoring 12 goals for Al-Ittihad.

- Faouzi Abdelghani – Al-Ittihad – 2011–14
- Zakaria Aboub – Al-Raed – 2008–09
- Hicham Aboucherouane – Al-Ittihad – 2008–10
- Jaouad Akaddar – Al-Raed – 2010–12
- Mohamed Al Makahasi – Al-Wehda – 2024–25
- Nordin Amrabat – Al-Nassr – 2018–21
- Salaheddine Aqqal – Al-Ettifaq, Al-Hazem, Al-Raed, Al-Taawoun – 2008–12
- Amine Atouchi – Abha – 2019–23
- Aziz Ayat Aabi – Abha – 2008–09
- Walid Azaro – Al-Ettifaq – 2019–22
- **Mourad Batna** – **Al-Fateh** – 2020–
- Achraf Bencharki – Al-Hilal – 2017–18
- Abdelkarim Benhania – Al-Wehda – 2009–10
- Aziz Bouhaddouz – Al-Batin – 2018–19
- **Yassine Bounou** – **Al-Hilal** – 2023–
- Mbark Boussoufa – Al-Shabab – 2018–19
- Abdelmounaim Boutouil – Al-Hazem – 2025–26
- Manuel da Costa – Al-Ittihad – 2018–20
- Jalal Daoudi – Al-Raed – 2019–21
- Karim Eddafi – Al-Hazem – 2008–09
- Karim El Ahmadi – Al-Ittihad – 2018–22
- Youssef El-Arabi – Al-Hilal – 2011–12
- **Younes El Bahraoui** – **Al-Taawoun** – 2026–
- Karim El Berkaoui – Al-Raed – 2020–25
- Mounir El Hamdaoui – Al-Taawoun – 2016–17
- Moestafa El Kabir – Al-Ahli – 2014–15
- **Aschraf El Mahdioui** – **Al-Taawoun** – 2021–
- Jawad El Yamiq – Al-Wehda, Al-Najma – 2023–26
- **Youssef En-Nesyri** – **Al-Ittihad** – 2025–
- Issam Erraki – Al-Wehda, Al-Raed – 2010–13, 2017–18
- **Houssam Essadak** – **Al-Fateh** – 2026–
- Fayçal Fajr – Al-Wehda, Al-Taawoun – 2022–25
- Driss Fettouhi – Al-Hazem, Al-Ahli – 2019–21
- Mohamed Fouzair – Al-Nassr, Ohod, Al-Raed – 2017–25
- Zakaria Hadraf – Damac – 2019–20
- Abdelilah Hafidi – Al-Hazem – 2021–22
- **Abderrazak Hamdallah** – Al-Nassr, Al-Ittihad, Al-Shabab, **Al-Taawoun** – 2018–
- Ahmed Hammoudan – Al-Raed – 2018–19
- Jamal Harkass – Damac – 2025–26
- Adil Hermach – Al-Hilal – 2011–14
- Mouhcine Iajour – Damac – 2019–20
- Youssef Kaddioui – Al-Wehda – 2009–11
- Ismaël Kandouss – Al-Orobah – 2024–25
- **Ahmed Khatir** – **Al-Riyadh** – 2025–
- Zouhair Laaroubi – Ohod – 2018–19
- Saâd Lagrou – Al-Nassr – 2017–18
- Youness Mankari – Al-Ettifaq – 2009–10
- Abdelali Mhamdi – Abha – 2019–22
- Tarik Miri – Al-Raed – 2008–09
- Munir Mohamedi – Al-Wehda – 2022–24
- Youness Mokhtar – Al-Nassr – 2015–16
- Mohamed Nahiri – Al-Ain – 2020–21
- Abdessamad Ouarrad – Najran – 2009–10
- Ayoub Qasmi – Al-Raed – 2024–25
- Abdessamad Rafik – Al-Wehda – 2009–10
- Moha Rharsalla – Al-Hazem – 2021–22
- **Marwane Saâdane** – **Al-Fateh** – 2019–
- Abdelhamid Sabiri – Al-Fayha, Al-Taawoun – 2023–25
- Romain Saïss – Al-Shabab – 2023–24
- Amine Sbaï – Al-Fateh – 2024–26
- Hassan Taïr – Al-Shoulla, Al-Raed – 2012–15
- Nawfel Zerhouni – Al-Hazem – 2021–22
- Khalid Zouine – Abha – 2008–09

== Mozambique ==
- Luís Miquissone – Abha – 2022–23

== Netherlands ==
- **Elton Acolatse** – **Al-Hazem** – 2026–
- **Steven Bergwijn** – **Al-Ittihad** – 2024–
- Youssef El Jebli – Al-Faisaly, Al-Batin – 2019–22
- Hicham Faik – Al-Faisaly – 2020–22
- Wesley Hoedt – Al-Shabab – 2024–26
- Ola John – Al-Hazem – 2021–22
- Adam Maher – Damac – 2022–24
- Mohamed Rayhi – Al-Batin – 2020–22
- **Tijjani Reijnders** – **Al-Qadsiah** – 2026–
- Dries Saddiki – Abha – 2022–23
- Xandro Schenk – Al-Batin – 2020–21
- Bart Schenkeveld – Al-Khaleej – 2025–26
- **Crysencio Summerville** – **Al-Hilal** – 2026–
- Vito van Crooij – Al-Wehda – 2023–25
- **Georginio Wijnaldum** – Al-Ettifaq, **Al-Ittihad** – 2023–

== New Caledonia ==
- **Angelo Fulgini** – Al-Taawoun, **Al-Khaleej** – 2025–

== Niger ==
- Ousmane Diabaté – Al-Batin – 2017–18
- Moussa Maâzou – Ohod – 2018–19
- Amadou Moutari – Al-Ain, Al-Fayha – 2020–22
- Yousef Omar – Al-Hazem – 2019–20, 2021–22
- **Youssouf Oumarou** – **Al-Hazem** – 2025–

== Nigeria ==
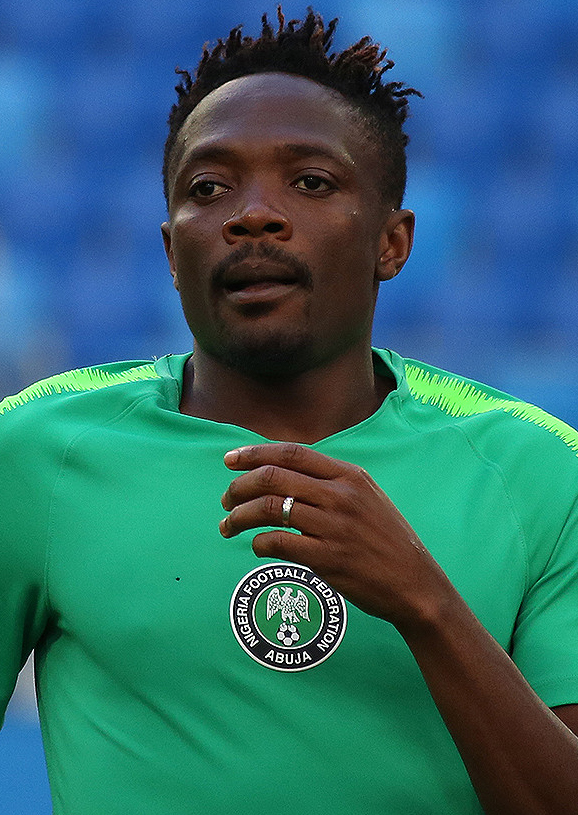
At €16.5 million, Ahmed Musa was the most expensive player in Pro League history.

- Uche Agba – Al-Qadsiah – 2011–12
- Joseph Akpala – Al-Faisaly – 2018–19
- Izuchuckwu Anthony – Al-Khaleej – 2022–23
- Franklin Ayodele – Hajer – 2011–12
- Edorisi Ekhosuehi – Al-Qadsiah – 2010–11
- Emmanuel Emmanuel – Al-Fateh – 2009–10
- Michael Eneramo – Al-Ettifaq – 2016–17
- Ndubuisi Eze – Al-Ahli – 2008–09
- Patrick Eze – Al-Qadsiah – 2016–17
- Reuben Gabriel – Abha – 2019–20
- Saviour Godwin – Al-Okhdood – 2023–25
- Ezekiel Henty – Al-Hazem – 2021–22
- Abdulshakour Hosawi – Al-Batin – 2017–18
- Kennedy Igboananike – Al-Hazem – 2018–19
- Odion Ighalo – Al-Shabab, Al-Hilal, Al-Wehda – 2020–25
- **George Ilenikhena** – **Al-Ittihad** – 2025–
- Imran Ilyas – Al-Shabab, Damac – 2019–20
- Leke James – Al-Qadsiah – 2020–21
- Nasigba John-Jumbo – Al-Qadsiah – 2010–12
- Ahmed Musa – Al-Nassr – 2018–21
- Anthony Nwakaeme – Al-Fayha – 2022–24
- Peter Nworah – Al-Ain – 2020–21
- Obinna Obiefule – Najran – 2014–15
- Godfrey Oboabona – Al-Ahli – 2017–18
- Ambrose Ochigbo – Al-Kholood – 2024–25
- Stanley Ohawuchi – Al-Qadsiah – 2017–18, 2020–21
- John Ogu – Al-Adalah – 2019–20
- Henry Onyekuru – Al-Fayha – 2023–25
- Ifeanyi Onyilo – Al-Faisaly – 2015–16
- Waheed Oseni – Al-Taawoun, Najran – 2012–14
- Isaac Promise – Al-Ahli – 2014–15
- Moussa Soulaimane – Najran – 2009–10
- William Troost-Ekong – Al-Kholood – 2024–26

== North Macedonia ==
Until 2019 named Republic of Macedonia

- Ezgjan Alioski – Al-Ahli – 2021–22, 2023–24
- Zoran Baldovaliev – Najran, Al-Qadsiah – 2011–12
- Ertan Demiri – Al-Taawoun – 2010–11
- Ferhan Hasani – Al-Raed – 2018–19
- Mensur Kurtiši – Al-Taawoun – 2010–11
- Šakir Redžepi – Al-Taawoun – 2010–12
- Aleksandar Trajkovski – Al-Fayha – 2021–23
- Darko Velkovski – Al-Ettifaq – 2022–23

== Norway ==
- Liban Abdi – Al-Ettifaq – 2017–18
- Pa-Modou Kah – Al-Wehda – 2012–13
- **Joshua King** – **Al-Khaleej** – 2025–
- Tokmac Nguen – Al-Okhdood – 2025–26
- Mathias Normann – Al-Raed – 2023–25
- Amahl Pellegrino – Damac – 2020–21
- Gustav Wikheim – Al-Fateh – 2019–22

== Oman ==
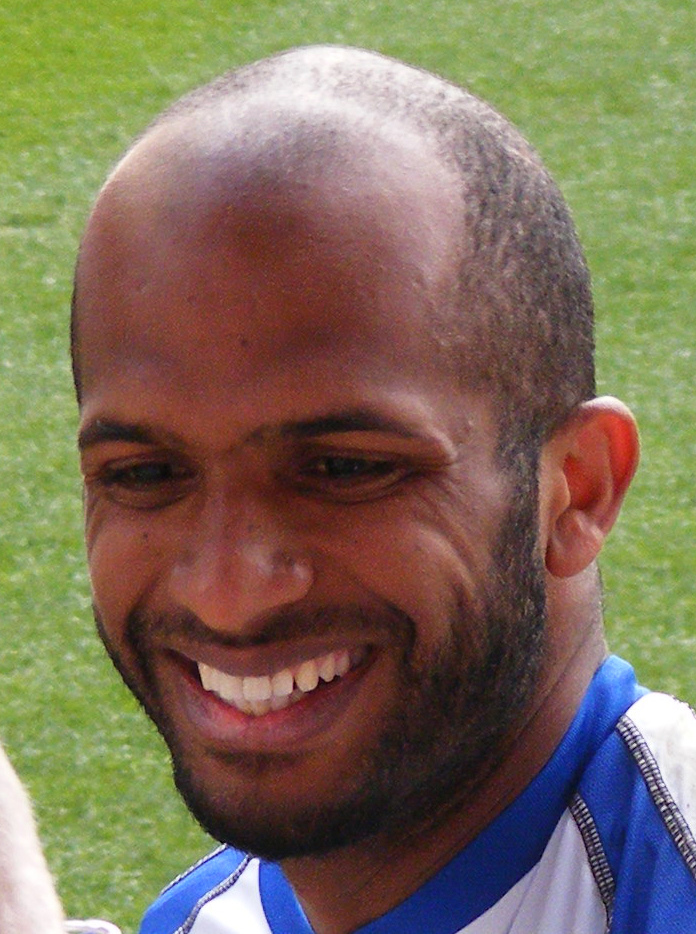
In 2017–18, Ali Al-Habsi became the first foreign goalkeeper to win the Pro League.

- Ismail Al-Ajmi – Al-Faisaly – 2012–13
- Eid Al-Farsi – Al-Raed – 2015–16
- Ali Al-Habsi – Al-Hilal – 2017–19
- Hussain Al-Hadhri – Al-Raed – 2013–14
- Amad Al-Hosni – Al-Ahli, Al-Nassr – 2010–14
- Mohsin Al-Khaldi – Ohod – 2017–18
- Badar Al-Maimani – Al-Ettifaq – 2009–10
- Abdul Salam Al-Mukhaini – Al-Raed – 2011–13
- Abdul Aziz Al-Muqbali – Al-Taawoun – 2012–13
- Said Al-Shoon – Al-Qadsiah – 2009–10
- Khalifa Ayil – Al-Ettifaq, Al-Raed – 2009–11
- Ahmed Hadid – Al-Ittihad – 2008–11
- Ahmed Mubarak Kano – Al-Ahli, Al-Fateh, Al-Ettifaq – 2009–11, 2012–13
- Talal Khalfan – Najran – 2008–09
- Hassan Mudhafar – Al-Ettifaq – 2010–12
- Hassan Rabia – Al-Nassr – 2008–09
- Saad Suhail – Al-Nassr – 2017–18

== Palestine ==
- Abdelatif Bahdari – Hajer – 2011–13
- Imad Khalili – Al-Shabab – 2013–14
- Ashraf Nu'man – Al-Faisaly, Hajer – 2014–16

== Panama ==
- José Luis Garcés – Al-Ettifaq – 2009–10
- **Orlando Mosquera** – **Al-Fayha** – 2024–

== Paraguay ==
- Víctor Ayala – Al-Nassr – 2016–17
- Nelson Figueredo – Al-Qadsiah – 2009–10
- Kaku – Al-Taawoun – 2020–23
- Jesús Medina – Damac – 2025–26

== Peru ==
- André Carrillo – Al-Hilal, Al-Qadsiah – 2018–23, 2024–25
- Juan Cominges – Al-Qadsiah – 2009–11
- Christian Cueva – Al-Fateh – 2020–23
- Christofer Gonzáles – Al-Adalah – 2022–23
- Christian Ramos – Al-Nassr – 2018–19
- Alex Valera – Al-Fateh – 2022–23

== Poland ==
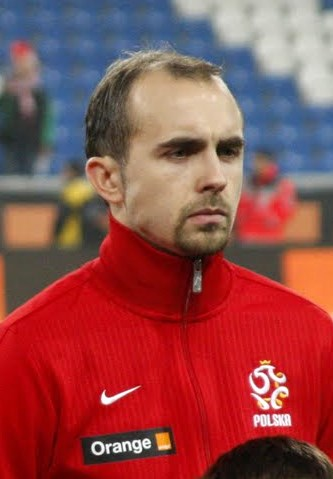
Adrian Mierzejewski won the Pro League with Al-Nassr in 2014–15.

- **Marcin Bułka** – **Neom** – 2025–
- Łukasz Gikiewicz – Al-Wehda – 2015–16
- Michał Janota – Al-Fateh – 2019–20
- Grzegorz Krychowiak – Al-Shabab, Abha – 2022–24
- Adrian Mierzejewski – Al-Nassr – 2014–16
- Łukasz Szukała – Al-Ittihad – 2014–15

== Portugal ==
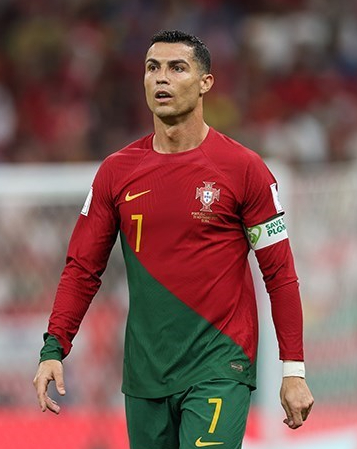
Five-time Ballon d'Or winner Cristiano Ronaldo joined Al-Nassr in January 2023.

- Pedro Amaral – Al-Khaleej – 2022–23
- André André – Al-Ittihad – 2021–22
- **Leandro Antunes** – **Al-Riyadh** – 2025–
- Arsénio – Al-Fayha – 2019–20
- Nuno Assis – Al-Ittihad – 2010–11
- **João Cancelo** – **Al-Hilal** – 2024–
- **João Costa** – **Al-Ettifaq** – 2024–
- **Samú Costa** – **Al-Nassr** – 2026–
- **Miguel Crespo** – **Al-Khaleej** – 2026–
- Eder – Al-Raed – 2021–22
- Pedro Eugénio – Al-Adalah – 2022–23
- **João Félix** – **Al-Nassr** – 2025–
- Jorge Fernandes – Al-Fateh – 2024–26
- **Roger Fernandes** – **Al-Ittihad** – 2025–
- Hernâni Fortes – Al-Wehda – 2020–21
- Guga – Al-Najma – 2025–26
- Paulo Jorge – Al-Ittihad – 2010–12
- Jota – Al-Ittihad – 2023–24
- Ricardo Machado – Al-Taawoun – 2015–20
- **Luís Maximiano** – **Neom** – 2025–
- Fábio Martins – Al-Shabab, Al-Khaleej, Al-Hazem – 2020–21, 2022–26
- André Moreira – Al-Raed – 2023–25
- **Rúben Neves** – **Al-Hilal** – 2023–
- **Paulo Oliveira** – **Al-Fayha** – 2026–
- **Otávio** – Al-Nassr, **Al-Qadsiah** – 2023–
- **Danilo Pereira** – **Al-Ittihad** – 2024–
- André Pinto – Al-Fateh – 2019–20
- **Daniel Podence** – **Al-Shabab** – 2024–
- **Pedro Rebocho** – **Al-Khaleej** – 2023–
- Ivo Rodrigues – Al-Khaleej – 2023–24
- Tiago Rodrigues – Al-Hazem – 2021–22
- **Cristiano Ronaldo** – **Al-Nassr** – 2022–
- Diogo Salomão – Al-Hazem – 2018–19
- **Tozé** – Al-Hazem, **Al-Riyadh** – 2023–
- **Francisco Trincão** – **Al-Ahli** – 2026–
- Ukra – Al-Fateh – 2016–17

== Puerto Rico ==
- Héctor Ramos – Al-Qadsiah – 2015–16

== Qatar ==
- Talal Al-Bloushi – Al-Shabab – 2008–09

== Romania ==
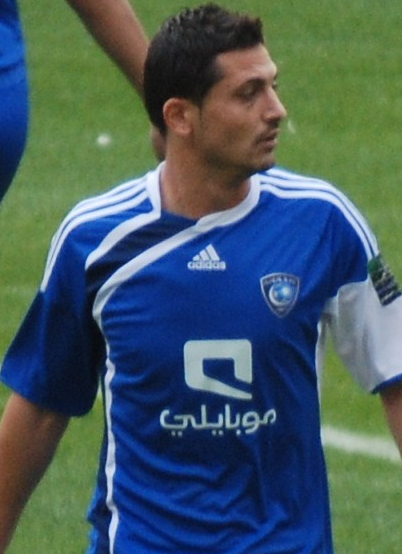
Mirel Rădoi won two Pro League titles with Al-Hilal.

- Mircea Axente – Al-Faisaly – 2016–18
- Mihai Bordeianu – Al-Qadsiah – 2020–21
- Constantin Budescu – Al-Shabab, Damac – 2018–19, 2020–21
- Andrei Burcă – Al-Okhdood – 2023–24
- Răzvan Cociș – Al-Nassr – 2010–11
- Andrei Cordea – Al-Tai – 2023–24
- Alexandru Crețu – Al-Wehda – 2024–25
- Cristian Dănălache – Al-Ettifaq – 2009–10
- Valerică Găman – Al-Shabab – 2018–19
- Nicolae Grigore – Al-Ettifaq – 2013–14
- **Mihai Lixandru** – **Al-Fateh** – 2026–
- Silviu Lung Jr. – Al-Raed – 2022–23
- Alexandru Mitriță – Al-Ahli, Al-Raed – 2020–21, 2022–23
- Florin Niță – Damac – 2024–25
- Ovidiu Petre – Al-Nassr – 2010–11
- Mihai Pintilii – Al-Hilal – 2014–15
- Adrian Popa – Al-Taawoun – 2017–18
- Mirel Rădoi – Al-Hilal – 2008–11
- Enes Sali – Al-Riyadh – 2024–26
- Lucian Sânmărtean – Al-Ittihad, Al-Taawoun – 2014–17
- Nicolae Stanciu – Al-Ahli, Damac – 2018–19, 2023–25
- Dorel Stoica – Al-Ettifaq – 2009–10
- Florin Tănase – Al-Okhdood – 2023–24
- Ciprian Tătărușanu – Abha – 2023–24
- Alin Toșca – Al-Riyadh – 2023–24

== Rwanda ==
- **Bonheur Mugisha** – **Al-Hazem** – 2026–

== São Tomé and Príncipe ==
- Luís Leal – Al-Ahli, Al-Fateh – 2013–14, 2016–17

== Scotland ==
- **Jack Hendry** – **Al-Ettifaq** – 2023–

== Senegal ==
- **Mamadou Thierno Barry** – **Al-Shabab** – 2026–
- Aliou Cissé – Al-Adalah – 2019–20
- Kemekho Cissokho – Al-Fateh – 2011–14
- Mbaye Diagne – Al-Shabab – 2014–15
- **Abdou Diallo** – **Abha** – 2026–
- Habib Diallo – Al-Shabab, Damac – 2023–25
- **Clayton Diandy** – **Al-Diriyah** – 2026–
- **Mory Diaw** – **Al-Shabab** – 2026–
- Albaye Papa Diop – Al-Faisaly – 2010–11
- Makhete Diop – Al-Watani, Al-Shabab – 2008–09, 2019–21
- Adama François – Hajer, Al-Khaleej – 2015–17
- **Idrissa Gueye** – **Al-Diriyah** – 2026–
- Ibrahima Gueye – Al-Ahli – 2008–09
- Mansour Gueye – Hajer – 2014–15
- Hamad Ji – Al-Hazem, Najran – 2008–11
- Macoumba Kandji – Al-Faisaly – 2014–15
- **Kalidou Koulibaly** – **Al-Hilal** – 2023–
- Diakite Lamine – Al-Ansar – 2011–12
- **Dion Lopy** – **Al-Ittihad** – 2026–
- Mamadou Loum – Al-Raed – 2023–24
- Sy Ass Mandaw – Al-Adalah – 2019–20
- Malick Mané – Najran – 2015–16
- **Sadio Mané** – **Al-Nassr** – 2023–
- Kader Mangane – Al-Hilal – 2012–13
- **Édouard Mendy** – **Al-Ahli** – 2023–
- Alfred N'Diaye – Al-Shabab – 2019–22
- Daouda N'Diaye – Al-Wehda – 2008–09
- Alassane Ndao – Al-Ahli – 2021–22
- Badou Ndiaye – Al-Ain – 2020–21
- M'Baye Niang – Al-Ahli – 2020–21
- Mohamed Roubize – Al-Hazem – 2008–11
- Abdoulaye Sané – Al-Taawoun – 2020–21
- Babacar Sarr – Damac – 2019–20
- **Abdoulaye Seck** – **Al-Faisaly** – 2026–
- **Moustapha Sémbène** – **Al-Taawoun** – 2025–
- Assane Sy – Al-Watani – 2008–09
- **Mamadou Sylla** – **Al-Riyadh** – 2025–
- Papa Waigo – Al-Ettifaq, Al-Raed – 2013–15

== Serbia ==
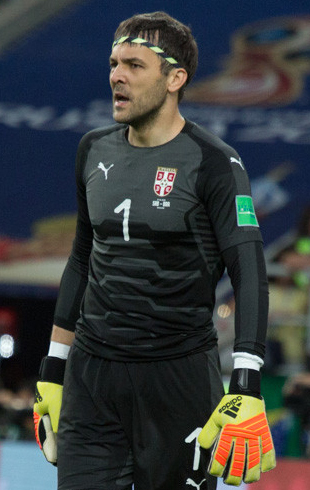
Vladimir Stojković won the Golden Glove award in 2021–22 with 13 clean sheets.

- Danijel Aleksić – Al-Ahli – 2019–20
- Dragan Ćeran – Hajer – 2015–16
- Dušan Đokić – Najran – 2011–12
- Ljubomir Fejsa – Al-Ahli – 2020–22
- **Matija Gluščević** – **Al-Ettifaq** – 2025–
- Nenad Injac – Al-Ansar – 2011–12
- Saša Jovanović – Al-Fateh – 2018–19, 2020–21
- Nikica Košutić – Al-Hazem – 2010–11
- Uroš Matić – Abha – 2021–24
- Nemanja Miletić – Al-Raed – 2020–21
- **Sergej Milinković-Savić** – **Al-Hilal** – 2023–
- Aleksandar Mitrović – Al-Hilal – 2023–25
- Nemanja Nikolić – Al-Raed – 2020–21
- Nemanja Obrić – Al-Hazem – 2010–11
- Milan Pavkov – Al-Fayha – 2022–24
- Aleksandar Pešić – Al-Ittihad – 2018–19
- Nikola Petković – Al-Ahli – 2010–11
- Aleksandar Prijović – Al-Ittihad – 2018–21
- **Predrag Rajković** – **Al-Ittihad** – 2024–
- **Jan-Carlo Simić** – **Al-Ittihad** – 2025–
- Marko Stanojević – Al-Fateh – 2015–16
- **Lazar Stojanović** – **Al-Shabab** – 2026–
- Luka Stojanović – Al-Hazem – 2021–22
- Vladimir Stojković – Al-Fayha – 2021–24
- Nemanja Tubić – Hajer – 2015–16
- Despot Višković – Al-Ansar – 2011–12
- Uroš Vitas – Al-Qadsiah – 2020–21

== Sierra Leone ==
- Alhaji Kamara – Al-Taawoun – 2017–18
- David Simbo – Najran – 2015–16
- Moses Turay – Al-Raed – 2024–25

== Slovakia ==
- **Ondrej Duda** – **Al-Ettifaq** – 2025–
- Boris Godál – Al-Adalah – 2022–23
- Norbert Gyömbér – Al-Kholood – 2024–26
- **Lukáš Haraslín** – **Al-Fateh** – 2026–
- Filip Kiss – Al-Ettifaq – 2017–22
- **Marek Rodák** – **Al-Ettifaq** – 2024–

== Slovenia ==
- Blaž Kramer – Al-Okhdood – 2025–26
- Dejan Rusič – Al-Taawoun – 2010–11, 2012–13
- David Tijanić – Al-Adalah, Al-Najma – 2022–23, 2025–26

== South Africa ==
- Elias Mokwana – Al-Hazem – 2025–26
- **Mohau Nkota** – **Al-Ettifaq** – 2025–

== Spain ==
- Alexis – Al-Ahli – 2018–19
- Iker Almena – Al-Qadsiah – 2024–25
- Alberto Botía – Al-Hilal, Al-Wehda – 2018–21, 2022–23
- Juanmi Callejón – Al-Ettifaq – 2016–18
- **Miguel Carvalho** – Al-Qadsiah, **Al-Hazem** – 2025–
- Álex Collado – Al-Okhdood, Al-Kholood – 2023–25
- **Coba da Costa** – **Al-Okhdood** – 2026–
- Paolo Fernandes – Al-Khaleej – 2025–26
- Álvaro González – Al-Nassr – 2022–23
- Sergio González – Al-Riyadh – 2025–26
- **Unai Hernández** – Al-Ittihad, **Al-Shabab** – 2024–
- Iago Herrerín – Al-Raed – 2021–22
- **Jason** – **Al-Fayha** – 2025–
- Juanmi – Al-Riyadh – 2023–24
- José Jurado – Al-Ahli – 2018–19
- **Iker Kortajarena** – **Al-Kholood** – 2025–
- Aymeric Laporte – Al-Nassr – 2023–25
- Pablo Marí – Al-Hilal – 2025–26
- **Iñigo Martínez** – **Al-Nassr** – 2025–
- **Álvaro Medrán** – Al-Taawoun, **Al-Ettifaq** – 2021–
- Santi Mina – Al-Shabab – 2022–23
- **Nacho** – **Al-Qadsiah** – 2024–
- Nono – Damac – 2021–23
- **Fernando Pacheco** – Al-Fateh, **Al-Faisaly** – 2025–
- Alejandro Pozuelo – Al-Fayha – 2024–25
- Dani Quintana – Al-Ahli – 2014–15
- **Óscar Rodríguez** – **Al-Diriyah** – 2026–
- Víctor Ruiz – Al-Fayha – 2022–24
- **Jaime Seoane** – **Al-Faisaly** – 2026–
- Jonathan Soriano – Al-Hilal – 2018–19
- Dani Suárez – Abha – 2021–2022
- Cristian Tello – Al-Fateh, Al-Orobah – 2022–25
- Gabri Veiga – Al-Ahli – 2023–25
- Fran Vélez – Al-Fateh – 2022–24

== Sudan ==
- Mohammed Al-Dhaw – Ohod, Al-Fateh – 2017–21
- Mohammed Hassan Babo – Damac – 2019–20
- Mohamed Ahmed Bashir – Al-Wehda – 2012–13

== Suriname ==
- Virgil Misidjan – Al-Tai – 2023–24
- **Shaquille Pinas** – **Al-Kholood** – 2025–
- Mitchell te Vrede – Al-Fateh, Abha – 2019–22

== Sweden ==
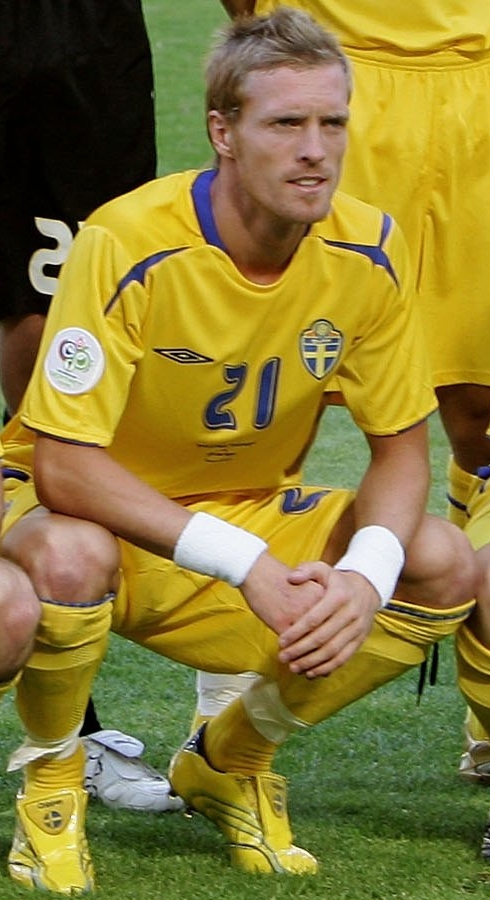
Christian Wilhelmsson won two Pro League titles with Al-Hilal.

- Marcus Antonsson – Al-Adalah – 2022–23
- Nabil Bahoui – Al-Ahli – 2015–16
- Nahir Besara – Al-Fayha – 2018–19
- **Jordan Larsson** – **Al-Ettifaq** – 2026–
- Robin Quaison – Al-Ettifaq – 2021–24
- Jacob Rinne – Al-Fateh – 2022–24
- Carlos Strandberg – Al-Hazem, Abha – 2019–22
- Christian Wilhelmsson – Al-Hilal – 2008–12

== Switzerland ==
- Martin Angha – Al-Adalah – 2022–23
- Cephas Malele – Al-Tai – 2021–22
- **Cameron Puertas** – **Al-Qadsiah** – 2024–25, 2026–
- **Vincent Sierro** – **Al-Shabab** – 2025–

== Syria ==
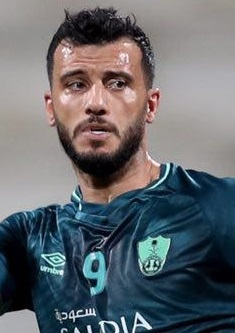
Omar Al Somah finished as top scorer three times in a row, and is the highest-scoring foreign player in Pro League history

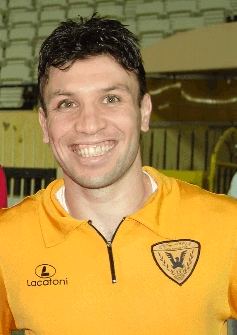
Jehad Al-Hussain holds the record for most assists in Pro League history with 51.

- Jehad Al Baour – Al-Wehda – 2015–17
- Abdelrazaq Al Hussain – Al-Taawoun – 2011–12
- Jehad Al Hussain – Najran, Al-Taawoun, Al-Raed – 2011–13, 2014–21
- Mahmoud Al Mawas – Al-Faisaly – 2015–16
- Mohammad Alsalkhadi – Damac – 2025–26
- Omar Al Somah – Al-Ahli, Al-Orobah, Al-Hazem – 2014–22, 2024–26
- Wael Ayan – Al-Faisaly, Najran – 2010–13
- Ahmad Deeb – Al-Fateh – 2014–15
- Tamer Haj Mohamad – Ohod – 2018–19
- Mohannad Ibrahim – Al-Ettifaq – 2008–09
- Mohammad Istanbuli – Al-Ansar – 2011–12
- Youssef Kalfa – Al-Hazem, Al-Qadsiah – 2018–19
- Omar Kharbin – Al-Hilal – 2016–21
- Mohammad Nayef – Al-Okhdood – 2025–26
- Raja Rafe – Al-Wehda – 2008–09

== Timor-Leste ==
- Murilo de Almeida – Al-Ettifaq – 2013–14

== Togo ==
- **Kennedy Boateng** – **Al-Fateh** – 2026–
- Khaled Narey – Al-Khaleej, Al-Okhdood – 2023–26
- Sadat Ouro-Akoriko – Al-Faisaly, Al-Khaleej – 2015–16

== Trinidad and Tobago ==
- Khaleem Hyland – Al-Faisaly, Al-Batin – 2017–21

== Tunisia ==
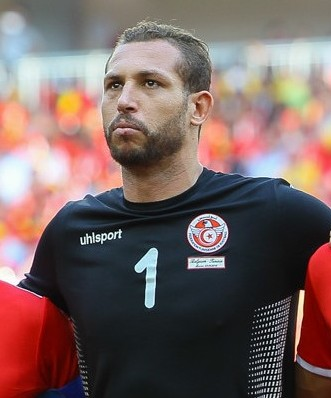
Farouk Ben Mustapha won the Golden Glove award in 2018–19

- Amine Abbes – Al-Nahda – 2013–14
- Ghazi Abderrazzak – Ohod – 2018–19
- Ahmed Akaïchi – Al-Ittihad, Al-Ettifaq – 2016–19
- Amir Akrout – Al-Wehda – 2008–09
- Karim Aouadhi – Abha – 2019–21
- Ghazi Ayadi – Damac – 2019–20
- Anice Badri – Al-Ittihad – 2019–20
- Rami Bedoui – Al-Fayha – 2018–19
- Aymen Belaïd – Ohod – 2018–19
- Mohamed Amine Ben Amor – Al-Ahli – 2017–18
- **Mohamed Amine Ben Hamida** – **Al-Hazem** – 2026–
- Farouk Ben Mustapha – Al-Shabab – 2017–20
- Radhouane Ben Ouanes – Al-Ansar – 2011–12
- Ramzi Ben Younès – Al-Fateh – 2009–11
- Fakhreddine Ben Youssef – Al-Ettifaq – 2017–19
- Naïm Berrabet – Al-Fateh – 2009–10
- Saad Bguir – Abha, Al-Wehda – 2019–25
- Moïne Chaâbani – Al-Qadsiah – 2010–11
- Firas Chaouat – Abha – 2019–20
- Lamjed Chehoudi – Al-Fateh – 2017–18
- Amine Chermiti – Al-Ittihad, Al-Fayha – 2009–10, 2018–19
- Aymen Dahmen – Al-Hazem – 2023–24
- Oussama Darragi – Al-Raed – 2015–16
- Zouheir Dhaouadi – Al-Wehda – 2015–16
- Hichem Essifi – Ohod – 2017–18
- Youssef Fouzai – Al-Adalah – 2019–20
- Saïf Ghezal – Al-Ahli – 2009–10
- Oussama Haddadi – Al-Ettifaq – 2019–20
- Bilel Ifa – Abha – 2021–22
- Issam Jebali – Al-Wehda – 2018–19
- Ammar Jemal – Al-Fateh – 2013–14
- Haythem Jouini – Al-Ain – 2020–21
- Aymen Mathlouthi – Al-Batin, Al-Adalah – 2017–18, 2019–20
- Mohammad Mothnani – Al-Qadsiah – 2017–18
- Hamdi Nagguez – Al-Ahli – 2021–22
- Abdelkader Oueslati – Al-Fateh – 2016–20
- Zied Ounalli – Al-Batin – 2018–19
- Bilel Sabri – Al-Wehda – 2008–09
- Bilel Saidani – Damac – 2019–21
- Ferjani Sassi – Al-Nassr – 2017–18
- Naïm Sliti – Al-Ettifaq – 2019–23
- Mejdi Traoui – Al-Wehda – 2008–09
- Mohamed Yacoubi – Al-Fateh – 2017–18

== Türkiye (Turkey) ==
- **Yusuf Akçiçek** – **Al-Hilal** – 2025–
- Emre Çolak – Al-Wehda – 2018–20
- **Merih Demiral** – **Al-Ahli** – 2023–
- Burak İnce – Al-Okhdood – 2025–26
- Berat Özdemir – Al-Ettifaq – 2022–24

== Ukraine ==
- **Artem Bondarenko** – **Al-Ahli** – 2026–
- Heorhiy Bushchan – Al-Shabab – 2024–25
- Maksym Koval – Al-Fateh – 2018–22

== United Arab Emirates ==
- Omar Abdulrahman – Al-Hilal – 2018–19
- Sebastián Tagliabúe – Al-Ettifaq, Al-Shabab – 2010–13

== United States ==
- Jeremiah White – Al-Ettifaq – 2009–10

== Uruguay ==
- **Rodrigo Abascal** – **Al-Riyadh** – 2026–
- Mauricio Affonso – Al-Shabab – 2015–16
- Matías Aguirregaray – Al-Fateh – 2018–20
- Brahian Alemán – Al-Ettifaq – 2018–19
- **Gastón Álvarez** – **Al-Qadsiah** – 2024–
- Ramón Arias – Al-Ettifaq – 2018–19
- Diego Arismendi – Al-Shabab – 2015–16
- Matías Britos – Al-Hilal – 2017–18
- Martín Campaña – Al-Batin, Al-Riyadh – 2020–24
- Ignacio de Arruabarrena – Al-Wehda – 2024–25
- Fabián Estoyanoff – Al-Nassr – 2014–15
- Adolfo Lima – Al-Wehda – 2015–17
- Renzo López – Al-Batin, Al-Fayha – 2022–23, 2024–25
- Nicolás Milesi – Al-Hilal – 2016–18
- **Nahitan Nández** – **Al-Qadsiah** – 2024–
- **Darwin Núñez** – Al-Hilal, **Al-Diriyah** – 2025–
- Juan Manuel Olivera – Al-Shabab – 2010–11
- Sebastián Píriz – Al-Shabab – 2016–17
- Jonathan Rodríguez – Al-Nassr – 2021–22
- Juan Pablo Rodríguez – Al-Ittihad – 2013–14
- **Luciano Rodríguez** – **Neom** – 2025–

== Uzbekistan ==
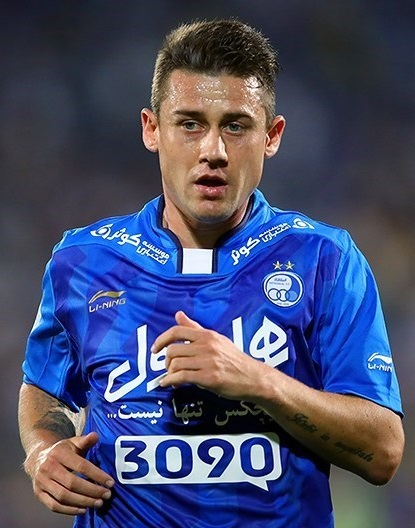
Server Djeparov won the Pro League with Al-Shabab in 2011–12

- Server Djeparov – Al-Shabab – 2011–13
- Jaloliddin Masharipov – Al-Nassr – 2021–23
- Shavkat Mullajanov – Al-Nassr – 2012–13
- Ignatiy Nesterov – Ohod – 2018–19
- Otabek Shukurov – Al-Fayha – 2024–25

== Venezuela ==
- Aldry Contreras – Al-Fayha – 2024–25
- Juan Falcón – Al-Fateh – 2015–16
- Juanpi – Al-Ain – 2020–21
- Adrián Martínez – Al-Tai – 2022–23
- Júnior Moreno – Al-Hazem – 2023–24
- Rómulo Otero – Al-Wehda – 2018–19
- Gelmin Rivas – Al-Ittihad, Al-Hilal – 2015–16, 2017–19
- Renné Rivas – Al-Taawoun – 2024–25
- Mikel Villanueva – Al-Fayha – 2025–26

== Yemen ==
- **Khaled Al-Asbahi** – **Al-Riyadh** – 2025–
- Abdulaziz Masnom – Al-Orobah – 2024–25

== Zambia ==
- Francis Kasonde – Al-Hazem – 2010–11
- **Fashion Sakala** – **Al-Fayha** – 2023–
- Saith Sakala – Al-Fateh – 2017–18

== Zimbabwe ==
- Knowledge Musona – Al-Tai, Al-Riyadh, Al-Okhdood – 2021–25
- Tendai Ndoro – Al-Faisaly – 2017–18

== Notes ==
1. Born in Argentina
2. Born in Angola
3. Born in Belgium
4. Born in Bosnia and Herzegovina (then part of Yugoslavia)
5. Born in Brazil
6. Born in Cameroon
7. Born in Canada
8. Born in Chad
9. Born in Colombia
10. Born in Croatia
11. Born in Croatia (then part of Yugoslavia)
12. Born in England
13. Born in France
14. Born in The Gambia
15. Born in Germany
16. Born in Georgia (then part of the Soviet Union)
17. Born in Ghana
18. Born in Greece
19. Born in Guinea-Bissau
20. Born in the Ivory Coast
21. Born in Kenya
22. Born in Kosovo (then part of Yugoslavia)
23. Born in Kuwait
24. Born in Mali
25. Born in Montenegro (then part of Yugoslavia)
26. Born in Morocco
27. Born in the Netherlands
28. Born in Nicaragua
29. Born in Nigeria
30. Born in North Macedonia (then Macedonia, part of Yugoslavia)
31. Born in Portugal
32. Born in Russia
33. Born in Saudi Arabia
34. Born in Scotland
35. Born in Serbia (then part of Serbia and Montenegro)
36. Born in Serbia (then part of Yugoslavia)
37. Born in Slovakia (then part of Czechoslovakia)
38. Born in Slovenia (then part of Yugoslavia)
39. Born in Somalia
40. Born in Spain
41. Born in Sweden
42. Born in Switzerland
43. Born in Togo
44. Born in Ukraine (then part of the Soviet Union)
45. Born in the United Arab Emirates
46. Born in Uzbekistan (then part of the Soviet Union)
47. Born in the Democratic Republic of Congo (then Zaïre)
48. Capped for the Argentina national under-20 football team
49. Capped for the Basque Country national football team
50. Capped for the Belgium national under-18 football team
51. Capped for the Belgium national under-19 football team
52. Capped for the Belgium national under-20 football team
53. Capped for the Belgium national under-21 football team
54. Capped for the Brazil national under-20 football team
55. Capped for the Brazil national under-23 football team
56. Capped for the Catalonia national football team
57. Capped for the Colombia national under-20 football team
58. Capped for the Croatia national under-20 football team
59. Capped for the DR Congo national football team
60. Capped for the England national football C team
61. Capped for the England national under-18 football team
62. Capped for the England national under-19 football team
63. Capped for the England national under-20 football team
64. Capped for the England national under-21 football team
65. Capped for the France national under-16 football team
66. Capped for the France national under-17 football team
67. Capped for the France national under-18 football team
68. Capped for the France national under-19 football team
69. Capped for the France national under-20 football team
70. Capped for the France national under-21 football team
71. Capped for the France national football team
72. Capped for the Germany national under-15 football team
73. Capped for the Germany national under-16 football team
74. Capped for the Germany national under-17 football team
75. Capped for the Germany national under-18 football team
76. Capped for the Germany national under-19 football team
77. Capped for the Germany national under-20 football team
78. Capped for the Mali national under-20 football team
79. Capped for the Netherlands national under-17 football team
80. Capped for the Netherlands national under-18 football team
81. Capped for the Netherlands national under-19 football team
82. Capped for the Netherlands national under-20 football team
83. Capped for the Netherlands national under-21 football team
84. Capped for the Norway national under-15 football team
85. Capped for the Norway national under-16 football team
86. Capped for the Norway national under-17 football team
87. Capped for the Norway national under-21 football team
88. Capped for the Nigeria national under-17 football team
89. Capped for the Portugal national under-16 football team
90. Capped for the Portugal national under-17 football team
91. Capped for the Portugal national under-18 football team
92. Capped for the Portugal national under-19 football team
93. Capped for the Portugal national under-21 football team
94. Capped for the Portugal national under-21 football team
95. Capped for the Portugal Olympic football team
96. Capped for the Portugal national football team
97. Capped for the Scotland national under-16 football team
98. Capped for the Serbia national under-19 football team
99. Capped for the Spain national under-18 football team
100. Capped for the Spain national under-20 football team
101. Capped for the Sweden men's national under-17 football team
102. Capped for the Sweden men's national under-19 football team
103. Capped for the Sweden national under-21 football team
104. Capped for the Switzerland national under-15 football team
105. Capped for the Switzerland national under-16 football team
106. Capped for the Switzerland national under-17 football team
107. Capped for the Switzerland national under-18 football team
108. Capped for the Switzerland national under-19 football team
109. Capped for the Switzerland national under-20 football team
110. Capped for the Switzerland national under-21 football team
111. Capped for the Turkey national under-16 football team
