= Rafael Carioca (disambiguation) =

Rafael Carioca (born 1989), Rafael de Souza Pereira, is a Brazilian football defensive midfielder for Tigres UANL.

Rafael Carioca may also refer to:

- Rafael Carioca (footballer, born 1986), Rafael Felipe Barreto, Brazilian football midfielder
- Rafael Carioca (footballer, born 1992), Rafael Bruno Cajueiro da Silva, Brazilian football left-back for Inter de Limeira

== See also ==
- Rafael Caroca (born 1989), Chilean football midfielder
