= Rafael Carioca (footballer, born 1986) =

Brazilian footballer

Personal information
- Full name: Rafael Felipe Barreto
- Date of birth: 17 July 1986 (age 40)
- Place of birth: Rio de Janeiro, Brazil
- Height: 1.70 m (5 ft 7 in)
- Position: Midfielder

Team information
- Current team: Juventus (SC)

Senior career*
Years	Team	Apps	(Gls)
2004–2008	Joinville	1	(0)
2004	→ Caxias (SC) (loan)		
2007	→ Figueirense (loan)		
2008	→ Desportiva (ES) (loan)		
2008	→ Vasco da Gama (loan)		
2009–2010	Banat Zrenjanin	18	(1)
2011	América de Natal		
2011	Mesquita		
2014	Juventus (SC)		
2016–2017	Al Wehda		
2019–	Juventus (SC)		
- * Club domestic league appearances and goals as of 31 October 2019

Rafael Felipe Barreto, commonly known as Rafael Carioca (born 17 July 1986) is a professional Brazilian football midfielder playing with Juventus (SC).

== Career ==
Rafael Carioca started playing with Joinville in 2005 and stayed until 2008, but, he had stints on loan with Caxias Futebol Clube, Figueirense (2007), Desportiva Ferroviária (2008) and CR Vasco da Gama (2008). He made one appearance for Joinville in the 2006 Campeonato Brasileiro Série C, and one appearance in each, Campeonato Catarinense 2006 and 2007. Earlier, he made 2 appearances for Caxias in the 2004 Campeonato Catarinense.

In January 2009 he was contracted by the Serbian SuperLiga club FK Banat Zrenjanin, where he played until summer 2010. When he came the club was struggling in the 2008–09 Serbian SuperLiga and after the end of the second half of the season the club ended up relegated with Rafael playing 7 matches and scoring once. In the next season, 2009-10 Banat was competing at second national tier, the Serbian First League with Rafael playing further 11 matches.

In January 2011 he was back in Brazil and he signed with América Futebol Clube (RN). In summer 2011 he moved to Mesquita Futebol Clube.

== Honours ==
- Figueirense
  - Copa do Brasil runner-up: 2007
