= 2001–02 Saudi Premier League =

Saudi Premier League
- Season: 2001–02
- Champions: Al-Hilal (9th title)
- Relegated: Al-Ansar; Al-Wehda
- AFC Champions League: Al-Hilal; Al-Ahli
- Top goalscorer: Sérgio Ricardo (16 goals)

Statistics of the 2001–02 Saudi Premier League.

== Clubs ==
=== Stadia and locations ===
Locations of teams in the 2001-02 Saudi Professional League

Club	Location	Stadium	Head coach
Al-Ahli	Jeddah	Prince Abdullah Al-Faisal Sports City	(Bosnia and Herzegovina) Rizah Mešković
Al-Ansar	Medina	Prince Mohammed bin Abdul Aziz Stadium	
Al-Ettifaq	Dammam	Prince Mohamed bin Fahd Stadium	
Al-Hilal	Riyadh	King Fahd Sports City	(Colombia) Francisco Maturana
Al-Ittihad	Jeddah	Prince Abdullah Al-Faisal Sports City	(Brazil) Oscar
Al-Najma	Unaizah	Department of Education Stadium	(Bulgaria) Dobromir Zhechev
Al-Nassr	Riyadh	King Fahd Sports City	(Argentina) Jorge Habegger
Al-Riyadh	Riyadh	King Fahd Sports City	
Al-Shabab	Riyadh	King Fahd Sports City	(Brazil) Arthur Bernardes
Al-Shoulla	Al-Kharj	Al-Shoulla Club Stadium	(Saudi Arabia) Khalid Al-Koroni
Al-Tai	Ḥaʼil	Prince Abdulaziz bin Musa'ed Sports City	(Brazil) Palhinha
Al-Wehda	Mecca	King Abdulaziz Sports City	(Brazil) Luis Carlos

=== Foreign players ===
Club	Player 1	Player 2	Player 3	Player 4	Former players
Al-Ahli	(Bahrain) Mohamed Husain	(Senegal) Mohammad Cham			(Egypt) Reda Seeka
Al-Ansar					
Al-Ettifaq	(Algeria) Hamid Bahloul	(Ecuador) Gilson de Souza	(Egypt) Samir Kamouna	(Senegal) Makhète N'Diaye	
Al-Hilal	(Brazil) Edmilson	(Brazil) Macedo	(Brazil) Túlio		(Colombia) Ricardo Pérez (Romania) Ioan Lupescu
Al-Ittihad	(Brazil) Lindomar	(Brazil) Luizinho Vieira	(Brazil) Sérgio Ricardo		
Al-Najma	(Brazil) Célio Lúcio	(Brazil) Wagner	(Ghana) Isaac Kwakye		
Al-Nassr	(Bolivia) Julio César Baldivieso	(Ivory Coast) Fadel Keïta	(Ivory Coast) Solaymane Konaté	(Uruguay) Jorge Delgado	
Al-Riyadh	(Senegal) Diéne Faye	(Senegal) Mamoun Diop	(Senegal) Oumar Traoré		
Al-Shabab	(Brazil) Anderson	(Brazil) Jackson	(Guinea) Alhassane Koivogui	(Ivory Coast) Moussa Traoré	
Al-Shoulla	(Brazil) André Oliveira	(Brazil) Cláudio Prates	(Chile) Claudio Núñez	(Sudan) Akef Ataa	
Al-Tai	(Brazil) Celso Costa	(Senegal) Boubacar Soumaré	(Senegal) Hamad Ji		
Al-Wehda	(Angola) Paulo Silva	(Mali) Mamadou Keïta	(Togo) Tchagafo Agoro		

== Final league table ==
Pos	Team	Pld	W	D	L	GF	GA	GD	Pts
1	Al-Hilal	22	14	7	1	54	17	+37	49
2	Al-Ittihad	22	15	4	3	59	25	+34	49
3	Al-Nassr	22	13	5	4	40	19	+21	44
4	Al-Ahli	22	12	4	6	39	26	+13	40
5	Al-Riyadh	22	8	7	7	39	44	−5	31
6	Al-Shoulla	22	7	7	8	21	25	−4	28
7	Al-Najma	22	7	4	11	33	46	−13	25
8	Al-Ettifaq	21	6	5	10	23	38	−15	23
9	Al-Shabab	21	5	7	9	23	28	−5	22
10	Al-Tai	22	5	4	13	26	42	−16	19
11	Al-Wehda	22	3	6	13	23	41	−18	15
12	Al-Ansar	22	3	6	13	27	56	−29	15

== Championship playoff ==
=== Fourth place game ===
14 April 2002	Al-Nassr	0–0 (a.e.t.) (3–1 p)	Al-Ahli	King Fahd Sports City, Riyadh
				Referee: Ibrahim Al-Nfisa
	Penalties
	Ali Yazid (penalty missed); Fadel Keïta (penalty scored); Abdullah Al-Janoubi (penalty scored); Julio César Baldivieso (penalty scored)		(penalty missed) Mohammed Sheliah; (penalty missed) Khalid Al-Shanif; (penalty missed) Hussein Abdulghani; (penalty scored) Fouzi Al-Shehri

=== Third place game ===
19 April 2002	Al-Ittihad	2–1 (a.e.t.)	Al-Nassr	Prince Abdullah Al-Faisal Sports City, Jeddah
	Lindomar 85' (pen.); Al-Hasan Al-Yami 89'		54' Ahmad Jahawi	Referee: Mohammed Al-Marwani

=== Final ===
1 May 2002	Al-Hilal	2–1 (a.e.t.)	Al-Ittihad	Prince Abdullah Al-Faisal Sports City, Jeddah
	Abdullah Al-Jumaan Al-Dosari 80'; Abdullah Al-Jumaan Al-Dosari 87'		90' Al-Hasan Al-Yami	Attendance: 23,000; Referee: Daffer Al Shehri

Saudi Premier League
2001–02 winners
Al-Hilal
9th title

== Top scorers ==
Rank	Scorer	Club	Goals
1	(Brazil) Sérgio Ricardo	Al-Ittihad	16
2	(Brazil) Edmilson	Al-Hilal	15
3	(Saudi Arabia) Hussein Al-Ali	Al-Hilal	13
3	(Senegal) Diéne Faye	Al-Riyadh	13
