= 2002–03 Saudi Premier League =

Saudi Premier League
- Season: 2002–03
- Champions: Al-Ittihad (6th title)
- Relegated: Al-Raed; Al-Najma
- AFC Champions League: Al-Ittihad; Al-Hilal
- Top goalscorer: Carlos Tenorio (15 goals)

Statistics of the 2002–03 Saudi Premier League.

== Clubs ==
=== Stadia and locations ===
Locations of teams in the 2002-03 Saudi Professional League

Club	Location	Stadium	Head coach
Al-Ahli	Jeddah	Prince Abdullah Al-Faisal Sports City	(Serbia and Montenegro) Ilija Lukić
Al-Ettifaq	Dammam	Prince Mohamed bin Fahd Stadium	(Brazil) Zé Mário
Al-Hilal	Riyadh	King Fahd Sports City	(Netherlands) Aad de Mos
Al-Ittihad	Jeddah	Prince Abdullah Al-Faisal Sports City	(Saudi Arabia) Khalid Al-Koroni
Al-Najma	Unaizah	Department of Education Stadium	(Brazil) Gildo Rodrigues
Al-Nassr	Riyadh	King Fahd Sports City	(Argentina) Julio Asad
Al-Qadsiah	Khobar	Prince Saud bin Jalawi Sports City	(Tunisia) Youssef Zouaoui
Al-Raed	Buraidah	King Abdullah Sports City	(Brazil) China
Al-Riyadh	Riyadh	King Fahd Sports City	
Al-Shabab	Riyadh	King Fahd Sports City	
Al-Shoulla	Al-Kharj	Al-Shoulla Club Stadium	
Al-Tai	Ḥaʼil	Prince Abdulaziz bin Musa'ed Sports City	(Saudi Arabia) Khalil Al-Masri

=== Foreign players ===
Club	Player 1	Player 2	Player 3	Player 4	Former players
Al-Ahli	(Bahrain) Mohamed Husain	(Egypt) Mohamed Barakat	(Morocco) Bouchaib El Moubarki	(Tunisia) Khaled Badra	(Senegal) Mamadou Diallo
Al-Ettifaq	(Brazil) Fabiano	(Brazil) Léo Guerra	(Ghana) Abdullah Quaye	(Ghana) Laryea Kingston	(Ivory Coast) Souleymane Cissé
Al-Hilal	(Brazil) Leandro Ávila	(Cameroon) Patrick Suffo	(Ivory Coast) Aliou Siby Badra	(Russia) Andrei Kanchelskis	(Brazil) Somália (Brazil) Túlio
Al-Ittihad	(Brazil) Maurílio	(Guinea) Titi Camara	(Italy) Gennaro Ruotolo	(Nigeria) Chikelue Iloenyosi	(Brazil) Bebeto (Brazil) Lindomar (Brazil) Sérgio Ricardo (Nigeria) Tijani Babangida
Al-Najma	(Brazil) Marcelo Scott	(Ghana) Isaac Kwakye	(Ivory Coast) Lassina Traoré	(Senegal) Oumar Traoré	
Al-Nassr	(Bolivia) Julio César Baldivieso	(Democratic Republic of the Congo) Rock Buskapa	(Ecuador) Carlos Tenorio		(Argentina) Cristian Gastón Castillo (Brazil) Paulo Nunes
Al-Qadsiah	(Brazil) Alex Pinho	(Brazil) Wellington	(Tunisia) Ady	(Tunisia) Ferid Chouchane	(Ecuador) Gilson de Souza
Al-Raed	(Mauritania) Modi Ngalim Traoré	(Senegal) Aly Male	(Senegal) Mody N'Diaye		
Al-Riyadh	(Senegal) Cheikh Sarr	(Senegal) Diéne Faye	(Senegal) Mamoun Diop		(Brazil) Schwenck (Senegal) Oumar Traoré
Al-Shabab	(Brazil) Lindomar	(Egypt) Hossam Abdel-Aal			(Brazil) Anderson
Al-Shoulla	(Brazil) Alexander Parreira	(Chile) Claudio Núñez	(Russia) Aleksandr Saratov		
Al-Tai	(Brazil) Celso Costa	(Senegal) Boubacar Soumaré	(Senegal) Hamad Ji		

== Final league table ==
Pos	Team	Pld	W	D	L	GF	GA	GD	Pts
1	Al-Ittihad	22	15	4	3	53	24	+29	49
2	Al-Ahli	22	15	2	5	54	23	+31	47
3	Al-Nassr	22	12	6	4	49	26	+23	42
4	Al-Qadsiah	22	13	3	6	37	27	+10	42
5	Al-Hilal	22	11	8	3	28	18	+10	41
6	Al-Shabab	22	11	5	6	36	22	+14	38
7	Al-Tai	22	6	6	10	21	33	−12	24
8	Al-Ettifaq	22	5	7	10	30	37	−7	22
9	Al-Shoulla	22	5	7	10	31	45	−14	22
10	Al-Riyadh	22	5	5	12	19	37	−18	20
11	Al-Raed	22	3	4	15	24	55	−31	13
12	Al-Najma	22	0	5	17	18	53	−35	5

== Championship playoff ==
=== Match against fourth place ===
15 May 2003	Al-Nassr	0–1	Al-Qadsiah	Prince Faisal bin Fahd Sports City, Riyadh
			20' Saleh Al-Sarhani	Referee: Mamdouh Al-Mrdas

=== Match against third place ===
22 May 2003	Al-Ahli	3–2	Al-Qadsiah	Prince Faisal bin Fahd Sports City, Riyadh
	Mohamed Barakat 63'; Bouchaib El Moubarki 76'; Ibrahim Suwayed 120'		22' Saeed Al-Wadaani; 53' Saeed Al-Wadaani	Referee: Mujib Al-Dosari

=== Final ===
28 May 2003	Al-Ittihad	3–2	Al-Ahli	King Fahd Sports City, Riyadh
	Hamzah Idris 48'; Manaf Abushgeer 82'; Osama Al-Muwallad 88'		67' (pen.) Bouchaib El Moubarki; 69' Talal Al-Meshal	Referee: Mujib Al-Dosari

Saudi Premier League
2002–03 winners
Al-Ittihad
6th title

== Season statistics ==
=== Top scorers ===
Rank	Scorer	Club	Goals
1	(Ecuador) Carlos Tenorio	Al-Nassr	15
2	(Democratic Republic of the Congo) Rock Buskapa	Al-Nassr	14
3	(Chile) Claudio Núñez	Al-Shoulla	12
4	(Egypt) Mohamed Barakat	Al-Ahli	11
4	(Saudi Arabia) Nawaf Al-Dajani	Al-Shoulla	11
