= Khalid Al-Koroni =

Saudi Arabian football manager (born 1959)

Personal information
- Full name: Khalid Abdulrahman Ibrahim Al-Koroni
- Date of birth: 31 December 1959 (age 66)
- Place of birth: Riyadh, Saudi Arabia
- Position: Midfielder

Youth career
- Al-Riyadh

Senior career*
Years	Team	Apps	(Gls)
1977–1991	Al-Riyadh		

Managerial career
- 1990–1992: Al-Riyadh (assistant)
- 1992: Al-Riyadh (caretaker)
- 1992–1997: Al-Riyadh (assistant)
- 1997: Al-Riyadh U17
- 1997–1999: Al-Riyadh
- 1999: Al-Tai
- 1999: Saudi Arabia U23 (assistant)
- 1999: Saudi Arabia U23
- 2000: Al-Shoulla
- 2000: Saudi Arabia U17
- 2000: Saudi Arabia U17 (assistant)
- 2000–2001: Al-Hazem
- 2001–2002: Al-Shoulla
- 2002: Al-Riyadh
- 2002–2003: Al-Wehda
- 2003: Al-Ittihad
- 2003–2004: Al-Wehda
- 2004–2005: Al-Riyadh
- 2005: Al-Hazem
- 2005: Al-Nassr U20
- 2005–2006: Al-Nassr
- 2006: Al-Raed
- 2006–2007: Al-Tai
- 2007: Al-Qadsiah
- 2008: Al-Wehda
- 2009: Al-Riyadh
- 2010: Al-Riyadh
- 2010–2012: Saudi Arabia U20
- 2012–2014: Saudi Arabia U23
- 2014: Al-Ittihad
- 2014: Al-Wehda
- 2015–2016: Al-Shoulla
- 2016: Al-Batin
- 2016–2017: Al-Batin
- 2018: Al-Shabab
- 2019: Al-Riyadh
- 2020: Hetten
- 2022: Al-Kholood
- 2023–2024: Wej
- 2025: Al-Zulfi
Medal record
Men's football
Representing Saudi Arabia (as manager)
AFC U-23 Championship
Runner-up	2013
- * Club domestic league appearances and goals

Khalid Abdulrahman Ibrahim Al-Koroni (Arabic: خالد عبد الرحمن ابراهيم القروني; born 31 December 1959) is a Saudi Arabian professional football coach and former player who played for Al-Riyadh.

== Playing career ==
Having made his debut during the 1977–78 season, Al-Koroni spent his whole playing career with hometown club Al-Riyadh. In his first season with the club, they managed to get promoted to the 1978–79 Saudi Premier League and reached the final of 1978 King Cup. During his playing career, Al-Koroni managed to get promoted to the Premier League four times with Al-Riyadh.

== Managerial career ==
=== 1990–1999 ===
In 1991, Al-Koroni announced his retirement and was appointed as assistant manager of Al-Riyadh. In 1992, Al-Koroni was appointed as caretaker before returning to his previous post following the appointment of Zé Mário.

On 6 December 1997, Al-Koroni was appointed as Al-Riyadh's manager until the end of the season following the sacking of Jean-Michel Cavalli. At the time of his appointment, Al-Riyadh sat at tenth with only 8 points picked up from 10 games. Al-Riyadh's form started to improve and Al-Koroni managed to lead Al-Riyadh to ninth, 4 points off the relegation zone. Al-Koroni also managed to lead Al-Riyadh to their second Crown Prince Cup final, when they beat Al-Shoulla in the semi-finals. In the final, Al-Ahli defeated Al-Riyadh 3–2, courtesy of a golden goal. After ensuring the club's survival, Al-Koroni's contract was renewed for another year. On 11 February 1999, Al-Koroni announced his resignation as manager following conflicts with several players of the team.

=== 1999–2000 ===
On 24 February 1999, Al-Koroni was appointed as the manager of Al-Tai. At the time of his appointment, Al-Tai sat at ninth just four points above the relegation zone. Al-Koroni managed to finish eighth with Al-Tai and left following the expiration of his contract on 1 April 1999.

Al-Koroni was then appointed as assistant manager to Luisinho Lemos in the Saudi U23 national team. On 29 August 1999, Al-Koroni was appointed as head coach of the Saudi U23 national team following the sacking of Luisinho. Al-Koroni failed to qualify for the Olympics after finishing in second place, three points behind Kuwait in the qualifiers.

On 3 January 2000, Al-Koroni was appointed as the manager of Al-Shoulla until the end of the season.

On 6 February 2000, Al-Koroni left Al-Shoulla to manage the Saudi U17 national team. He was then made assistant following the appointment of Jean-Marie Conz.

=== 2000–2005 ===
On 10 November 2000, Al-Koroni was appointed as the head coach of Al-Hazem. On 27 March 2001, Al-Koroni resigned for personal reasons.

On 1 May 2001, Al-Koroni returned to manage Al-Shoulla for a second time. He managed to lead Al-Shoulla to a sixth-placed finish, their highest ever in the top flight. He left at the end of the season following the expiration of his contract.

On 21 May 2002, Al-Koroni returned to manage boyhood club Al-Riyadh for a third time. On 4 October 2002, Al-Koroni was sacked by Al-Riyadh.

On 8 October 2002, Al-Koroni was appointed as the manager of First Division club Al-Wehda. Al-Koroni managed to lead Al-Wehda to the First Division and gain promotion to the Premier League.

On 3 May 2003, Al-Koroni was loaned to Premier League side Al-Ittihad until the end of the season. Al-Koroni managed to win the Premier League title after defeating Al-Ahli 3–2 in the final. He became the first manager to win both the Premier League title and First Division title in one season. Al-Koroni also managed to win the 2003 Saudi-Egyptian Super Cup after defeating Ismaily 1–0 in the final.

Al-Koroni left Al-Ittihad following the expiration of his loan and returned to Al-Wehda.

On 2 August 2004, Al-Koroni was appointed as the manager of Al-Riyadh for the fourth time. On 4 February 2005, Al-Koroni was sacked by Al-Riyadh.

On 17 March 2005, Al-Koroni was appointed as the manager of First Division side Al-Hazem. Al-Koroni managed to lead Al-Hazem to their first First Division title as well as gain promotion to the top flight for the first time in the club's history.

=== 2005–2014 ===
On 14 September 2005, Al-Koroni was appointed as the manager of Al-Nassr's U20 team. Following the sacking of Mariano Barreto, Al-Koroni was appointed as Al-Nassr's manager on 23 November 2005. On 15 January 2006, Al-Koroni resigned from his post after a 3–0 defeat to Al-Ahli.

On 12 February 2006, Al-Koroni was appointed as Al-Raed's manager until the end of the season.

On 4 December 2006, Al-Koroni returned to manage Al-Tai for the second time. On 1 February 2007, Al-Koroni was sacked after failing to achieve a single win.

On 1 March 2007, Al-Koroni was appointed as the manager of Al-Qadsiah until the end of the season. At the time of his appointment, Al-Qadsiah sat at 11th in the relegation zone. He managed to finish 10th and avoid relegation.

On 18 February 2008, Al-Koroni replaced Jan Versleijen as the manager of Al-Wehda.

On 13 February 2009, Al-Koroni returned to manage Al-Riyadh for the fifth time. He left at the end of the season following the expiration of his contract. On 11 January 2010, Al-Koroni was appointed as Al-Riyadh's manager for the sixth time.

On 30 March 2010, Al-Koroni was appointed as the manager of the Saudi U20 national team. He resigned from his post as Al-Riyadh's manager on 12 April 2010. He managed to lead them to the Round of 16 of the 2011 FIFA U-20 World Cup. He was then appointed as the manager of the Saudi U23 national team in 2012. He managed to win the 2012 GCC U-23 Championship and finish as runners-up in the 2013 AFC U-22 Championship.

=== 2014–present ===
On 1 March 2014, Al-Koroni was appointed as Al-Ittihad's manager following the sacking of Juan Verzeri. On 28 August 2014, he was sacked after Al-Ittihad were eliminated by Al Ain in the Quarter-finals of the 2014 AFC Champions League.

On 22 September 2014, Al-Koroni returned to manage Al-Wehda for the third time. He was sacked on 28 October 2014 after losing three matches and drawing one in four matches.

On 31 October 2015, Al-Koroni was appointed as Al-Shoulla's manager until the end of the season.

On 28 April 2016, Al-Koroni was appointed as Al-Batin's manager. He managed the team during the promotion play-offs against Al-Raed, which they lost 5–3 on aggregate.

On 6 November 2016, Al-Koroni returned to Al-Batin following Adel Abdel Rahman's sacking.

On 8 March 2018, Al-Koroni was appointed as Al-Shabab's manager following the sacking of José Carreño.

On 27 January 2019, Al-Koroni returned to manage Al-Riyadh for the seventh time. He resigned from his post on 15 October 2019.

On 26 February 2020, Al-Koroni was appointed as Hetten's manager until the end of the season. He resigned on 27 July 2020 whilst the season was put on hold due to the COVID-19 pandemic.

On 13 April 2022, Al-Koroni was appointed as Al-Kholood's manager until the end of the season. On 17 May 2022, Al-Kholood renewed Al-Koroni's contract until the end of the 2022–23 season. On 5 October 2022, Al-Koroni was sacked following a 2–0 defeat to Al-Sahel.

On 4 December 2023, Al-Koroni was appointed as the manager of Second Division side Wej.

On 5 March 2025, Al-Koroni was appointed as manager of First Division League club Al-Zulfi. On 2 December 2025, Al-Koroni left the club by mutual consent.

== Managerial statistics ==
As of match played 2 December 2025

Managerial record by team and tenure
Team	Nat	From	To	Record							
Team	Nat	From	To	G	W	D	L	GF	GA	GD	Win %
Al-Riyadh	(Saudi Arabia)	6 December 1997	11 February 1999	41	15	11	15	80	70	+10	36.59
Al-Tai	(Saudi Arabia)	24 February 1999	24 March 1999	5	2	1	2	4	6	−2	40.00
Al-Shoulla	(Saudi Arabia)	3 January 2000	6 February 2000	5	3	0	2	5	4	+1	60.00
Al-Hazem	(Saudi Arabia)	10 November 2000	27 March 2001	15	4	6	5	15	18	−3	26.67
Al-Shoulla	(Saudi Arabia)	1 May 2001	8 May 2002	28	9	7	12	28	35	−7	32.14
Al-Riyadh	(Saudi Arabia)	21 May 2002	4 October 2002	10	2	3	5	10	15	−5	20.00
Al-Wehda	(Saudi Arabia)	8 October 2002	1 May 2003	25	14	7	4	50	22	+28	56.00
Al-Ittihad	(Saudi Arabia)	3 May 2003	30 July 2003	4	2	0	2	6	6	+0	50.00
Al-Wehda	(Saudi Arabia)	30 July 2003	30 June 2004	27	7	5	15	37	52	−15	25.93
Al-Riyadh	(Saudi Arabia)	2 August 2004	4 February 2005	20	5	6	9	24	30	−6	25.00
Al-Hazem	(Saudi Arabia)	17 March 2005	23 May 2005	11	7	3	1	24	7	+17	63.64
Al-Nassr	(Saudi Arabia)	23 November 2005	15 January 2006	9	2	3	4	7	12	−5	22.22
Al-Raed	(Saudi Arabia)	12 February 2006	1 May 2006	11	1	5	5	7	14	−7	9.09
Al-Tai	(Saudi Arabia)	4 December 2006	1 February 2007	8	0	5	3	8	15	−7	0.00
Al-Qadsiah	(Saudi Arabia)	1 March 2007	11 May 2007	7	1	3	3	6	9	−3	14.29
Al-Wehda	(Saudi Arabia)	18 February 2008	5 May 2008	7	1	4	2	6	8	−2	14.29
Al-Riyadh	(Saudi Arabia)	13 February 2009	22 May 2009	13	5	4	4	14	14	+0	38.46
Al-Riyadh	(Saudi Arabia)	11 January 2010	12 April 2010	12	2	2	8	9	19	−10	16.67
Al-Ittihad	(Saudi Arabia)	1 March 2014	28 August 2014	16	8	1	7	29	25	+4	50.00
Al-Wehda	(Saudi Arabia)	22 September 2014	28 October 2014	4	0	1	3	2	5	−3	0.00
Al-Shoulla	(Saudi Arabia)	31 October 2015	27 April 2016	24	11	7	6	30	22	+8	45.83
Al-Batin	(Saudi Arabia)	27 April 2016	27 May 2016	2	1	0	1	3	5	−2	50.00
Al-Batin	(Saudi Arabia)	6 November 2016	22 May 2017	21	5	7	9	26	34	−8	23.81
Al-Shabab	(Saudi Arabia)	8 March 2018	1 May 2018	3	0	2	1	3	4	−1	0.00
Al-Riyadh	(Saudi Arabia)	27 January 2019	15 October 2019	11	3	4	4	12	16	−4	27.27
Hetten	(Saudi Arabia)	26 February 2020	27 July 2020	2	0	0	2	2	6	−4	0.00
Al-Kholood	(Saudi Arabia)	13 April 2022	5 October 2022	12	4	4	4	11	10	+1	33.33
Wej	(Saudi Arabia)	4 December 2023	1 May 2024	18	10	4	4	29	23	+6	55.56
Al-Zulfi	(Saudi Arabia)	5 March 2025	2 December 2025	21	6	8	7	22	24	−2	28.57
Total				392	130	113	149	509	530	−21	33.16

== Honours ==
=== Player ===
Al-Riyadh

- Saudi First Division: 1977–78, 1988–89, runner-up 1979–80, 1982–83
- King Cup runner-up: 1978

=== Manager ===
Al-Riyadh

- Crown Prince Cup runner-up: 1998

Al-Wehda

- Saudi First Division: 2002–03

Al-Ittihad

- Saudi Premier League: 2002–03
- Saudi-Egyptian Super Cup: 2003

Al-Hazem

- Saudi First Division: 2004–05

Saudi Arabia U23

- GCC U-23 Championship: 2012
