= 1998 Saudi Crown Prince Cup =

1998 Crown Prince Cup
Tournament details
- Country: Saudi Arabia
- Dates: 31 January – 11 March 1998
- Teams: 16 (main competition)

Final positions
- Champions: Al-Ahli (3rd title)
- Runners-up: Al-Riyadh
- Asian Cup Winners' Cup: Al-Ahli
- Arab Cup Winners' Cup: Al-Riyadh

Tournament statistics
- Matches played: 15
- Goals scored: 55 (3.67 per match)
- Top goal scorer(s): Diène Faye (4 goals)

The 1998 Crown Prince Cup was the 23rd season of the Saudi premier football knockout tournament since its establishment in 1957. The main competition started on 31 January and concluded with the final on 11 March 1998.

Al-Ittihad were the defending champions; however, they were eliminated in the Round of 16 by Al-Shabab.

In the final, Al-Ahli defeated Al-Riyadh 3–2 with a golden goal during extra time to secure their third title and first since 1970. The final was held at the King Fahd International Stadium in Riyadh. As winners of the tournament, Al-Ahli qualified for the 1999–2000 Asian Cup Winners' Cup. As runners-up, Al-Riyadh qualified for the 1999 Arab Cup Winners' Cup.

== Qualifying rounds ==
All of the competing teams that are not members of the Premier League competed in the qualifying rounds to secure one of 4 available places in the Round of 16. First Division sides Al-Raed and Hajer and Second Division sides Al-Akhdoud and Al-Orobah qualified.

== Bracket ==
Round of 16
H	Al-Ettifaq	0
A	Hajer	1
H	Al-Najma	1 (0)
A	Al-Shoulla (pen.)	1 (2)
A	Al-Riyadh	2
H	Al-Akhdoud	0
H	Al-Wehda	2
A	Al-Nassr	3
H	Al-Ittihad	0
A	Al-Shabab	2
H	Al-Tai	3
A	Al-Orobah	2
H	Al-Hilal	5
A	Al-Taawoun	1
A	Al-Raed	2
H	Al-Ahli	3

Quarter-finals
A	Hajer	0
H	Al-Shoulla	3
A	Al-Riyadh	2
H	Al-Nassr	1
H	Al-Shabab	3
A	Al-Tai	1
A	Al-Hilal	1
H	Al-Ahli	2

Semi-finals
H	Al-Shoulla	1
A	Al-Riyadh	3
H	Al-Shabab	2
A	Al-Ahli (asdet)	3

Final
–	Al-Riyadh	2
–	Al-Ahli (asdet)	3

== Round of 16 ==
The draw for the Round of 16 was held on 10 January 1998. The Round of 16 fixtures were played on 31 January and 15, 16, 17, 21 and 25 February 1998. All times are local, AST (UTC+3). Al-Hilal's match was moved to 31 January due to their participation in the 1998 Gulf Club Champions Cup. Al-Shoulla's match was delayed to 20 February due to their postponed league match against Al-Nassr being played on 15 February. Al-Nassr's match was delayed to 25 February due to their participation in the quarter-finals of the 1997–98 Asian Cup Winners' Cup.

31 January 1998	Al-Hilal (1)	5–1	Al-Taawoun (1)	Riyadh
19:45	Abu Thnain 47'; Al-Dokhi 52'; Valencia 64'; Al-Jaber 78'; Al-Thunayan 80'	Report	Al-Skaker 71'	Stadium: Prince Faisal bin Fahd Stadium; Referee: Mohammed Al-Marwani

15 February 1998	Al-Tai (1)	3–2	Al-Orobah (3)	Ha'il
15:45	Al-Gablan 21' (pen.); Jako 53'; Al-Madani 68'	Report	Khairallah 15'; Al-Madhayani 81'	Stadium: Prince Abdul Aziz bin Musa'ed Stadium; Referee: Mohammed Al-Suwail

16 February 1998	Al-Akhdoud (3)	0–2	Al-Riyadh (1)	Najran
15:45		Report	Al-Hamdan 35'; Faye 50'	Stadium: Al-Akhdoud Club Stadium; Referee: Saleh Al-Shamrani

16 February 1998	Al-Ahli (1)	3–2	Al-Raed (2)	Jeddah
20:15	Al-Meshal 26', 82'; Sérgio 71' (pen.)	Report	Al-Salal 21'; Bukhaye 65'	Stadium: Youth Welfare Stadium; Referee: Mohammed Al-Beshri

17 February 1998	Al-Ettifaq (1)	0–1	Al-Hajer (2)	Dammam
19:30		Report	Al-Busailan 81'	Stadium: Youth Welfare Stadium; Referee: Ibrahim Al-Omar

17 February 1998	Al-Ittihad (1)	0–2	Al-Shabab (1)	Jeddah
20:15		Report	Batista 32', 59' (pen.)	Stadium: Youth Welfare Stadium; Referee: Ibrahim Al-Nafisah

20 February 1998	Al-Najma (1)	1–1 (a.e.t.) (0–2 p)	Al-Shoulla (1)	Unaizah
15:45	Diop 40'	Report	Zanga 60'	Stadium: Department of Education Stadium; Referee: Omer Al Mehannah
	Penalties
	Kwakye (penalty missed); Diop (penalty missed); Ibrahima (penalty missed); Al-Munaif (penalty missed)		(penalty scored) Al-Tofail; (penalty missed) Al-Ammar; (penalty missed) Al-Kanaan; (penalty missed) Traoré; (penalty scored) Al-Jowayer

25 February 1998	Al-Wehda (1)	2–3	Al-Nassr (1)	Mecca
20:15	Adlane 12', 18' (pen.)	Report	Hadi 34'; Mater 57'; Naseeb 87'	Stadium: King Abdul Aziz Stadium; Referee: Yousef Al-Aqili

== Quarter-finals ==
The draw for the Quarter-finals was held on 19 February 1998. The Quarter-finals fixtures were played on 26 & 27 February and 1 & 3 March 1998. All times are local, AST (UTC+3). Al-Hilal's match was delayed to 3 March due to their participation in the quarter-finals of the 1997–98 Asian Club Championship.

26 February 1998	Al-Shabab (1)	3–1	Al-Tai (1)	Riyadh
20:20	Al-Owairan 34', 82'; Luciano 37'	Report	Al-Gablan 42'	Stadium: Prince Faisal bin Fahd Stadium; Referee: Ibrahim Al-Nafisah

27 February 1998	Al-Shoulla (1)	3–0	Hajer (2)	Al-Kharj
15:45	Zanga 58', 77'; Al-Ammar 67'	Report		Stadium: Al-Shoulla Club Stadium; Referee: Mohammed Al-Suwail

1 March 1998	Al-Nassr (1)	1–2	Al-Riyadh (1)	Riyadh
20:20	Sow 55'	Report	Faye 25', 75'	Stadium: Prince Faisal bin Fahd Stadium; Referee: Mohammed Al-Beshri

3 March 1998	Al-Ahli (1)	2–1	Al-Hilal (1)	Jeddah
20:30	Gahwji 10'; Al-Shahrani 31'	Report	Al-Mofarij 38'	Stadium: Youth Welfare Stadium; Referee: Nasser Al-Hamdan

== Semi-finals ==
The draw for the Semi-finals was held on 1 March 1998. The Semi-finals fixtures were played on 5 & 6 March 1998. All times are local, AST (UTC+3).

5 March 1998	Al-Shoulla (1)	1–3	Al-Riyadh (1)	Al-Kharj
20:25	Al-Tamimi 73'	Report	Al-Dossari 40'; Faye 53'; Traoré 81'	Stadium: Al-Shoulla Club Stadium; Referee: Abdulaziz Al-Sulaiman

6 March 1998	Al-Shabab (1)	2–3 (a.e.t.)	Al-Ahli (1)	Riyadh
20:25	Anwar 26'; Al-Owairan 52'	Report	Al-Dawod 23' (o.g.); Al-Shahrani 42'; Al-Meshal 118'	Stadium: King Fahd International Stadium; Referee: Omer Al Mehannah

== Final ==
The 1998 Crown Prince Cup Final was played on 11 March 1998 at the King Fahd International Stadium in Riyadh between Al-Ahli and Al-Riyadh. This was the third Crown Prince Cup final to be held at the stadium. This was Al-Ahli's fifth final and Al-Riyadh's third final. This was a repeat of the 1978 King Cup final. All times are local, AST (UTC+3).

11 March 1998
20:30

Al-Riyadh	2–3 (a.e.t.)	Al-Ahli
Al-Hamdan 33'; Al-Qadi 76' (pen.)	Report	Al-Shahrani 15'; Masaad 50', 97'

King Fahd International Stadium, Riyadh
Referee: Mujeb Al-Dossari

== Top goalscorers ==
Rank	Player	Club	Goals
1	(Senegal) Diène Faye	Al-Riyadh	4
2	(Cameroon) Zanga	Al-Shoulla	3
2	(Saudi Arabia) Saeed Al-Owairan	Al-Shabab	3
2	(Saudi Arabia) Talal Al-Meshal	Al-Ahli	3
2	(Saudi Arabia) Ibrahim Al-Shahrani	Al-Ahli	3
6	(Brazil) Marcelo Batista	Al-Shabab	2
6	(Algeria) Tarek Hadj Adlane	Al-Wehda	2
6	(Saudi Arabia) Fawaz Al-Gablan	Al-Tai	2
6	(Saudi Arabia) Fahd Al-Hamdan	Al-Riyadh	2
6	(Saudi Arabia) Khaled Masaad	Al-Ahli	2
