= 2000 Guangzhou Apollo F.C. season =

Guangzhou Apollo F.C. 2000
- Manager: Gildo Rodrigues (to 19 April); Zhou Suian (from 19 April)
- Stadium: Guangdong Provincial People's Stadium
- Jia-B League: 10th
- FA Cup: First Round

The 1999 season was the 47th year in Guangzhou Football Club's existence, their 33rd season in the Chinese football league and the 7th season in the professional football league.

Guangzhou Apollo finished 10th in the Jia-B League table.
