= 19th GCC Club Championship =

2002 GCC Club Championship
Tournament details
- Host country: Bahrain
- Dates: 11–22 March 2002
- Teams: 6 (from AFC/UAFA confederations)

Final positions
- Champions: (Saudi Arabia) Al-Ahli (2nd title)
- Runners-up: (Bahrain) Al-Muharraq

The 19th GCC Club Championship (Arabic: بطولة الأنديـة الخليجية أبطال الدوري) was the nineteenth edition of the GCC Club Championship for clubs of the Gulf Cooperation Council nations.

The 2002 edition was won by Saudi Arabian side Al-Ahli for the second time.

== Results ==
Team	Pts	Pld	W	D	L	GF	GA	GD
(Saudi Arabia) Al Ahli	13	5	4	1	0	10	4	+6
(Bahrain) Al Muharraq	9	5	3	0	2	7	5	+2
Al Kuwait	7	5	2	1	2	7	8	−1
(United Arab Emirates) Al Shabab	5	5	1	2	2	7	10	−3
(Oman) Dhofar	4	5	1	1	3	5	7	−2
(Qatar) Al Arabi	3	5	0	3	2	4	6	−2

All match were played in Bahrain.

Mar 11, 2002	Dhofar	0–2	Muharraq
Mar 12, 2002	Al Ahli	2–1	Al Kuwait
Mar 12, 2002	Al Shabab	0–0	Al Arabi
Mar 14, 2002	Dhofar	1–2	Al Kuwait
Mar 14, 2002	Muharraq	1–0	Al Arabi
Mar 15, 2002	Al Ahli	3–1	Al Shabab
Mar 16, 2002	Al Arabi	1–1	Dhofar
Mar 17, 2002	Al Kuwait	2–2	Al Shabab
Mar 17, 2002	Muharraq	0–1	Al Ahli
Mar 19, 2002	Muharraq	2–0	Al Kuwait
Mar 19, 2002	Al Ahli	2–2	Al Arabi
Mar 20, 2002	Dhofar	3–0	Al Shabab
Mar 21, 2002	Al Arabi	1–2	Al Kuwait
Mar 22, 2002	Al Ahli	2–0	Dhofar
Mar 22, 2002	Al Shabab	4–2	Muharraq

== Winner ==
GCC Club Championship
2002 Winners

Al-Ahli
2nd Title
