= Ameur Derbal =

Tunisian football manager

Personal information
- Date of birth: 1 July 1978 (age 48)
- Place of birth: Kairouan, Tunisia
- Height: 1.89 m (6 ft 2 in)
- Position: Centre-back

Senior career*
Years	Team	Apps	(Gls)
1998–2001	JS Kairouan		
2001–2003	Espérance		
2003–2004	Olympique Béja		
2004–2005	EOG Kram		
2005	Asswehly SC		
2005–2006	JS Kairouan		
2006–2007	FC Kharkiv		
2007–2009	JS Kairouan		

Managerial career
- 2018: JS Kairouan
- 2018–2019: Hetten
- 2019–2020: Al-Sahel
- 2020–2021: Al-Orobah
- 2022: Hatta
- 2022–2023: Al-Najma
- 2023–2024: Al-Shoulla
- * Club domestic league appearances and goals

Ameur Derbal (born 1 July 1978) is a Tunisian retired footballer and later manager.

A centre-back, je started and finished his career in JS Kairouan, and also had short stints in Libya and Ukraine.

After managing JS Kairouan, in 2020 he signed for Saudi club Al-Orobah FC. On 22 April 2022, Derbal was appointed as manager of Saudi club Al-Najma. On 30 May 2023, Derbal was appointed as manager of Al-Shoulla.
