= Ahmed Eid al-Harbi =

Saudi Arabian footballer (born 1948)

Ahmad Eid Al-Harbi
Personal information
- Full name: Ahmad Eid bin Mohammed Al-Harbi
- Date of birth: 10-05-1948
- Place of birth: Jeddah, Saudi Arabia
- Position: Goalkeeper

Senior career*
Years	Team	Apps	(Gls)
1970–1980	Al-Ahli Saudi FC		

International career
1970–1979	Saudi Arabia		
- * Club domestic league appearances and goals

Ahmad Eid Al-Harbi (born 1948) is a retired Saudi Arabian footballer who played as a goalkeeper for Al-Ahli Saudi FC and the Saudi Arabia national football team. He later served as the President of the Saudi Arabian Football Federation (SAFF) from 2012 to 2016. He is considered one of Al-Ahli's legends, both for his performances on the field and his contributions to Saudi football administration.

== Early life ==
Ahmad Eid was born in Jeddah, Saudi Arabia, in 1950. He showed early promise as a footballer, joining the youth ranks of Al-Ahli before making it to the first team.

== Club career ==
Eid spent his entire playing career at Al-Ahli Saudi FC, helping the team secure several league and cup titles during the 1970s. Known for his quick reflexes and leadership at the back, he played a key role in Al-Ahli's domestic dominance during that era.

== International career ==
Eid represented the Saudi Arabia national football team from 1970 to 1979, appearing in several major tournaments, including the Gulf Cup. His performances earned him recognition as one of the top goalkeepers in the region during his time.

== Administrative career ==
After retiring, Ahmad Eid transitioned into football administration. In 2012, he made history by becoming the first elected President of the Saudi Arabian Football Federation (SAFF). During his tenure, he worked on professionalizing the league system and enhancing youth development programs.

== Honors ==
=== Club ===
- Multiple Saudi League titles with Al-Ahli Saudi FC
- Multiple King Cup titles with Al-Ahli Saudi FC

=== Individual ===
- Recognized as one of the top Saudi goalkeepers of the 1970s
- First elected President of the Saudi Arabian Football Federation

== Legacy ==
Ahmad Eid Al-Harbi is celebrated as an icon at Al-Ahli and remains an influential figure in Saudi Arabian football history for both his athletic and administrative contributions.
