= 1968–69 Saudi Premier League =

Saudi General League
- Season: 1968–69
- Champions: Al-Ahli (1st title)

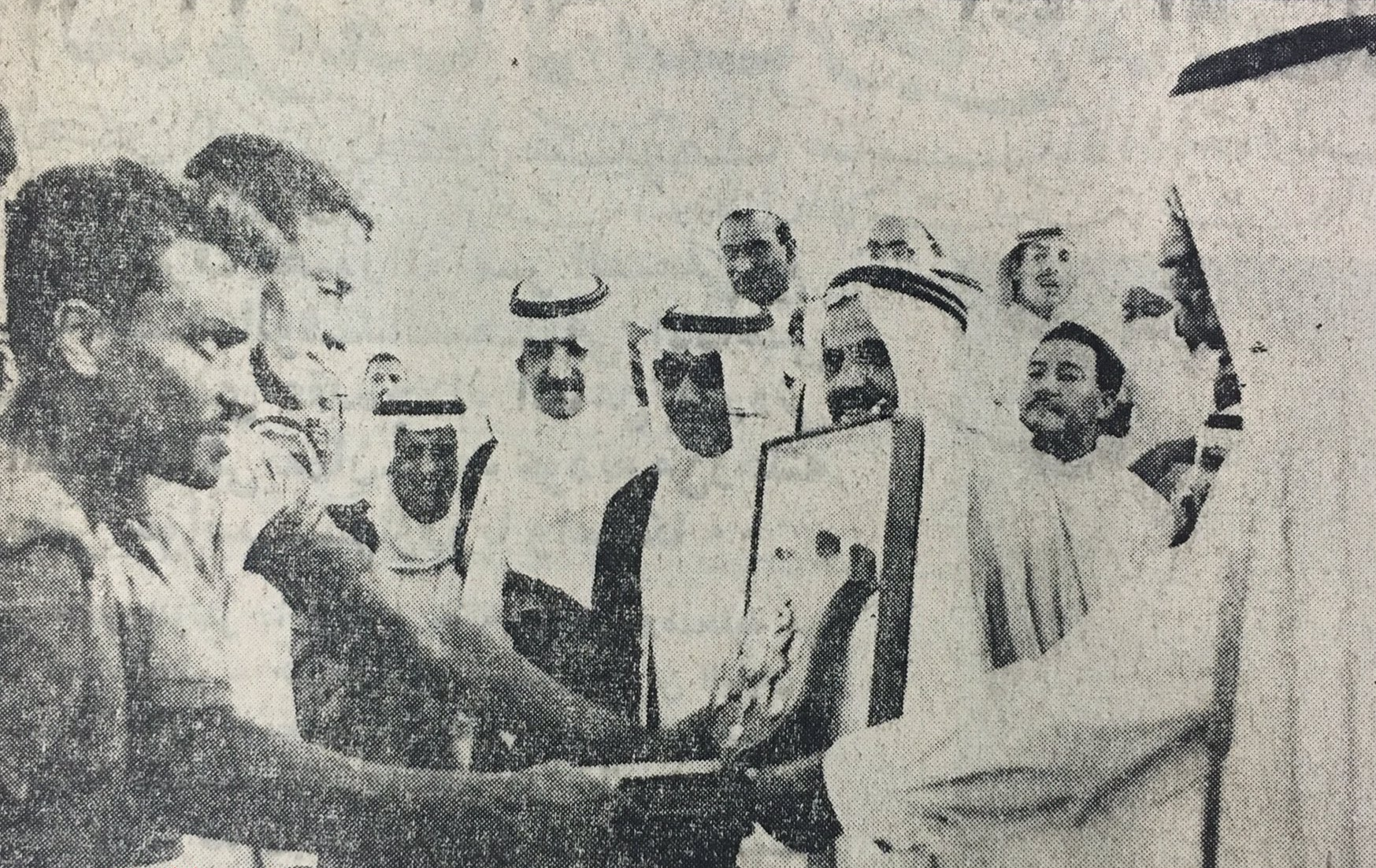
1968–69 Saudi Premier League

The 1968–69 Saudi General League season was the first successful attempt to establish a regular league in the Kingdom of Saudi Arabia, which was held 4 times between 1967 and 1970 but failed to be completed in all of them except in 1969. The 1969 season was won by Al-Ahly Club, which was the first club in Saudi history. The first league in 1966 contained 6 clubs: Al-Ittihad, Al-Wahda, Al-Nassr, Riyadh, Al-Ettifaq and Al-Qadisiyah, but was canceled before the second round started. Al-Ittihad and Al-Wahda were top of the league in the first round before the league was canceled due to the setback in June.

The semi-finals played between the champion of the central region Al-Nassr, against Al-Ahly, the champion of the western region. Al-Ahly defeated Al-Nassr and qualified for the final. Al-Ettifaq was the eastern region champion and played against Al-Jabalain, the second-league champion. Al-Ettifaq won and qualified to the final of the league to meet Al-Ahly.

Al-Ahly won the league after beating Al-Ettifaq in the final match 1–0, scored by Omar Rajkhan.

== Championship playoff ==
=== Semi-finals ===
Al-Ahli	3–1 (a.e.t.)	Al-Nassr

Al-Ettifaq	4–0 (a.e.t.)	Al Jabalain

=== Final ===
9 May 1969	Al-Ettifaq	0–1 (a.e.t.)	Al-Ahli
			Omar Rajkhan

Saudi General League 1968–69
(Saudi Arabia)
Al-Ahli
1st title
