= César Pereira =

Portuguese footballer

César
Personal information
- Full name: João César Gomes Pereira
- Date of birth: 29 December 1975 (age 50)
- Place of birth: Barcelos, Portugal
- Height: 1.92 m (6 ft 4 in)
- Position: Goalkeeper

Youth career
- 1989–1991: Estrelas Vila Frescaínha
- 1991–1994: Santa Maria

Senior career*
Years	Team	Apps	(Gls)
1994–1995	Gil Vicente	0	(0)
1995–1996	Marinhas		
1996–1997	Santa Maria		
1997–1998	Joane		
1998–2000	Valenciano		
2000–2001	Joane		
2000–2002	Freamunde	10	(0)
2002–2003	Dragões Sandinenses	12	(0)
2003–2004	Trofense	13	(0)
2004–2006	Lixa	51	(0)
2006–2009	Rio Ave	7	(0)
2009–2010	Ribeirão	23	(0)
- * Club domestic league appearances and goals

João César Gomes Pereira (born 29 December 1975), known as César, is a Portuguese retired footballer who played as a goalkeeper.

== Club career ==
César was born in Barcelos. During his career, spent mostly in Portugal's lower leagues, he played with Gil Vicente FC, F.C. Marinhas, Santa Maria FC, G.D. Joane (two spells), S.C. Valenciano, S.C. Freamunde, S.C. Dragões Sandinenses, C.D. Trofense, F.C. Lixa, Rio Ave F.C. and G.D. Ribeirão.

With the Vila do Conde club, César appeared seven times in the league but only once in the Primeira Liga, on 26 October 2008 in a 1–1 away draw against C.S. Marítimo where he came on as a 90th-minute substitute after Márcio Paiva was sent off. He left Rio Ave in June 2009, and retired the following year at the age of 34.
