= Al-Ahli Saudi FC =

Association football club in Saudi Arabia

Al-Ahli
- Full name: Al Ahli Saudi Football Club
- Nicknames: Al-Malaki (The Royals); Ma'aqil Al-Usood (Stronghold of Lions); Al-Raqi (The Classy Ones); Safir Al-Umam (Ambassador of Nations)
- Founded: 1937; 89 years ago
- Ground: King Abdullah Sports City; Prince Abdullah Al-Faisal Sports City (selected matches)
- Capacity: 62,345; 27,000
- Owner(s): Public Investment Fund (75%); Al-Ahli Non-Profit Foundation (25%)
- Chairman: Khalid bin Ahmed Ali Al-Ghamdi
- Head coach: Marino Pušić
- League: Saudi Pro League
- 2025–26: Pro League, 3rd of 18
- Website: en.alahlifc.sa
Home colours	Away colours	Third colours

Al-Ahli active departments
Football (men's)	Football (women's)	Basketball (men's)

Al-Ahli Saudi Football Club (Arabic: النادي الأهلي السعودي, romanized: an-nādī al-ʾahlī as-saʿūdī, lit. 'Saudi National Club'), commonly known as Al-Ahli, is a Saudi professional football club based in Jeddah. It competes in the Saudi Pro League, the top tier of Saudi football.

Since its founding in 1937, the club has been known as one of the most successful clubs in Saudi Arabia. Domestically, Al-Ahli has won 9 Saudi Professional Leagues, 8 Kings Cups, 6 Crown Prince Cups, 2 Super Cups and 3 Federations Cups. In international club football, they have won 2 AFC Champions League Elite, a record equal of three GCC Champions League and one Arab Club Championship. Al-Ahli was the first Saudi club to win the league and the King's Cup in the same season, and has done so twice - in 1978 and 2016.

Al-Ahli was one of the four founding members of the Saudi Pro League and had never been relegated from the top flight until the 2021–22 season. The other three are Al-Hilal, Al-Ittihad, and Al-Nassr. Al-Ahli hold the record for the longest unbeaten run in the league with their 51-match unbeaten streak from 2014 to 2016.

Al-Ahli's home games are played at King Abdullah Sports City, also known as the shining jewel Stadium. The stadium, which is shared with long-lasting city rivals Al-Ittihad since 2014 and Jeddah FC, is the second-largest stadium in Saudi Arabia, with a total capacity of approximately 63,000.

== History ==
=== Foundation and early years ===
Al-Ahli Saudi Football Club was founded in 1937 in Jeddah, Saudi Arabia. The idea of establishing the club came from a group of students from Al-Falah School, who sought to create a sporting institution that would represent the city and promote organized football activities.

In its early years, Al-Ahli participated in regional competitions in the Western Province, gradually building its reputation as one of the strongest teams in Jeddah. The club played a key role in the development of organized football in Saudi Arabia before the establishment of national league competitions.

On 2 July 2025, Al Ahli Saudi FC unveiled their new logo. Changed due to a Saudi law preventing the display of the national emblem, two swords over a palm tree for commercial purposes.

Logo 2009-2025

Logo present since 2025

=== 1950s: Growth and domestic prominence ===
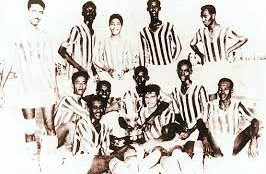
The first championship in the history of Al-Ahli club, in 1956–57, which is the Crown Prince Cup.

During the 1950s, Al-Ahli began achieving significant success in domestic tournaments. The club won its first major title, the Crown Prince Cup, in the 1956–57 season, marking the beginning of its emergence as a competitive force in Saudi football. Throughout the late 1950s and early 1960s, Al-Ahli consistently competed for national honors and contributed players to the Saudi national team.

The club became known for its technical style of play and its focus on youth development, establishing a strong foundation that would later define one of the most successful periods in its history.

=== 1960s and 1970s: Golden era ===
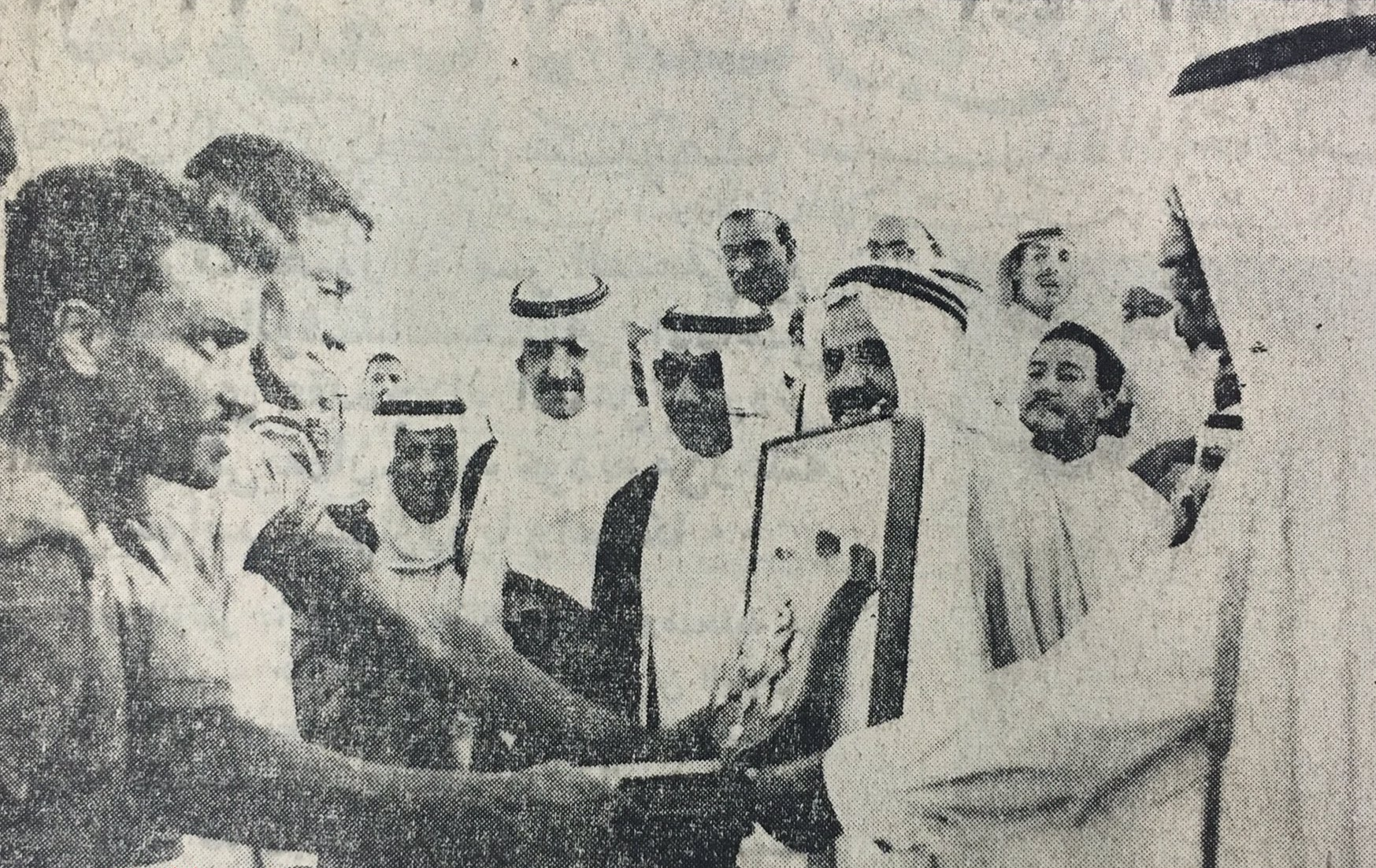
Al-Ahli achieved the first shield for the Saudi League in 1968-69

Al-Ahli won 7 Saudi League titles, five of them being consecutive league titles without a single defeat, 4 King Cup and one Crown Prince Cup, establishing itself as the strongest club across Saudi Arabia. These titles were later officially recognized, contributing to Al-Ahli's current record of nine league titles.

The team was led by players such as Abdulrazzaq Abu Dawood, Amin Dabo, and Ahmed Eid.

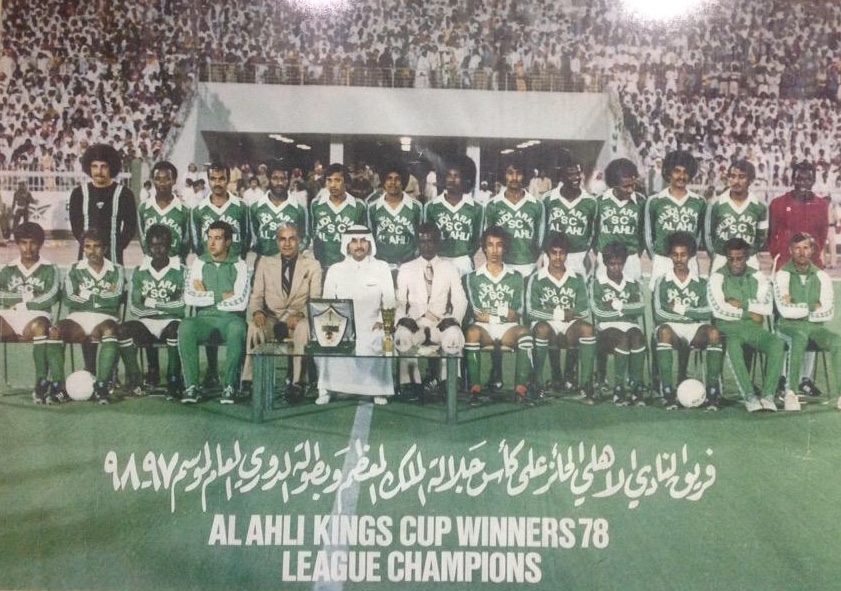
League and King's Cup 1978.

In the 1977–78 season, Al‑Ahli won a domestic double, claiming their first unified Saudi Premier League title alongside the King Cup. The Brazilian coach Didi managed Al‑Ahli from 1977 to 1981, guiding the team to these historic victories, including the league championship in 1978 and the King Cup in 1978.

=== 1980s: Era of Glory and Maradona appearance ===
In the 1983–84 season, the former Brazilian coach Telê Santana led Al-Ahli from 1983 to 1985, winning two major titles: the Saudi League in 1984 and the King Cup in 1983. Later, Al-Ahli also achieved success by winning the Gulf Club Champions League in 1985.

In 1987, during Al-Ahli 50th anniversary, Diego Maradona made an appearance for Al-Ahli. The Argentine footballer wore an Al-Ahli jersey and participated in the celebratory match held in Jeddah.

=== 1990s: Competitive but Runner-ups ===
In the 1990s, Al‑Ahli continued to be one of Saudi Arabia’s most competitive clubs, frequently finishing near the top of the Saudi Pro League but narrowly missing out on the championship. They were league runners‑up several times in this decade, including in 1989‑90, 1995‑96, and 1998‑99, demonstrating consistent strength in domestic competition. The club’s major success in this period came in knockout football, particularly with their Crown Prince Cup triumph in 1998, when they lifted the trophy in an exciting final, adding an important domestic silverware to their history.

=== 2000s: Regional Glory Era ===
in the 2000s though the Saudi league title still remained out of reach. They recorded strong finishes in the Saudi Pro League and enjoyed success in cup competitions, most notably winning the Crown Prince Cup in 2002 and 2007. In addition to cup glory, the club captured multiple Saudi Federation Cup titles (such as in 2001, 2002, and 2007), reinforcing their knack for knockout competition. Regionally, Al‑Ahli also captured the Arab Club Champions Cup in 2002 and the Gulf Club Champions League in 2002 and 2008 during this decade, adding international silverware to their trophy cabinet and further enhancing their reputation beyond Saudi borders.

=== 2010s: Historic treble ===
The 2010s marked a resurgence and arguably one of the most successful decades in Al‑Ahli’s modern history. The early part of the decade saw the club as league contenders, finishing as runners‑up in the 2011–12 Saudi Pro League and again in 2014–15 Saudi Pro League . Al‑Ahli captured the King’s Cup twice during this period, securing back‑to‑back titles in 2011 and 2012. The club capped this pre‑treble era by winning the 2014–15 Saudi Crown Prince Cup in the season, their sixth overall in the competition, when they defeated Al-Hilal 2–1 in the final.

During this era, the club also set a league record with a 51‑match unbeaten streak in the Saudi Pro League and reaffirmed themselves as one of the country’s top football forces.

After 32 years of near‑misses, they finally won the Saudi Pro League the club secured a historic treble under the management of Swiss coach Christian Gross by winning the 2015–16 Saudi Pro League Al-Ahli earned the league title two rounds before the end, after a 3–1 victory against rivals Al-Hilal at the King Abdullah Sports City in Jeddah. Syrian striker Omar Al Somah scored two goals.

Al-Ahli captured the 2016 King Cup, defeating Al-Nassr 2–1 in the final, with Al-Somah once again scoring. Later that year, Al-Ahli completed the treble by winning the 2016 Saudi Super Cup, held in London at Craven Cottage (the home stadium of Fulham FC), after defeating Al-Hilal on penalties following a 1–1 draw.

==== Al-Ahli vs FC Barcelona friendly match (2016) ====
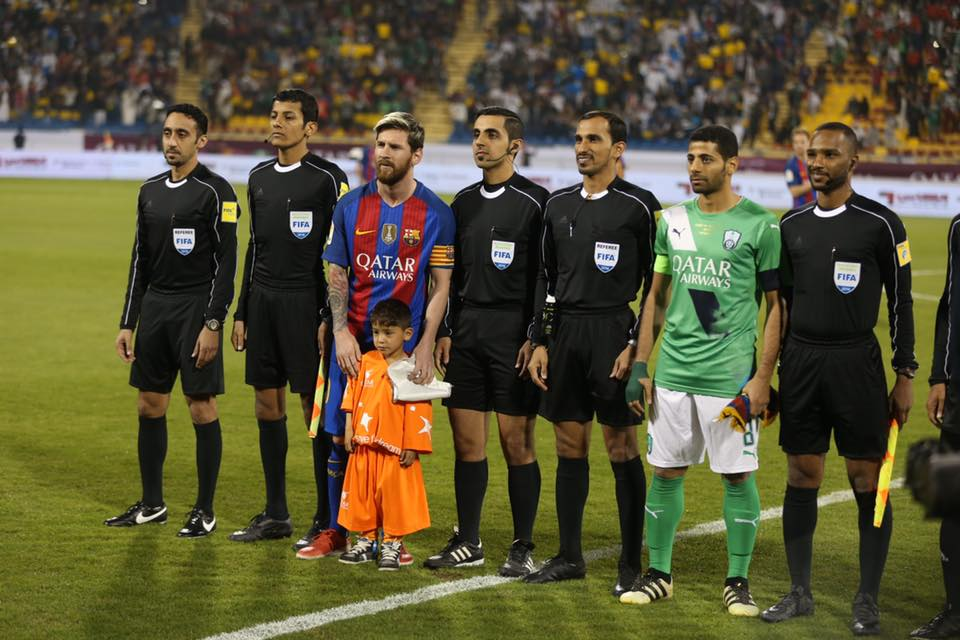
Al-Ahli vs FC Barcelona Friendly match 2016

On 13 December 2016, Al-Ahli played a friendly match against FC Barcelona at the Thani bin Jassim Stadium in Doha, Qatar. The match was part of the "Champions Match" organized by Qatar Airways, which was the official sponsor of both clubs at the time

Barcelona won the match 5–3, with goals scored by Lionel Messi, Neymar, Luis Suárez, Paco Alcácer, and Rafinha. Al-Ahli responded with three goals of their own.

=== 2020s: The Downfall and Asia Elite triumph ===
The 2020s began with contrasting fortunes for Al‑Ahli. In 2021–22 Saudi Pro League, for the first time in their long history, the club suffered relegation from the Saudi Pro League, marking a dramatic low point to Saudi First Division. However, they immediately bounced back in the 2022–23 Saudi First Division League season by winning League and securing promotion back to the top tier, showing resilience and ambition.

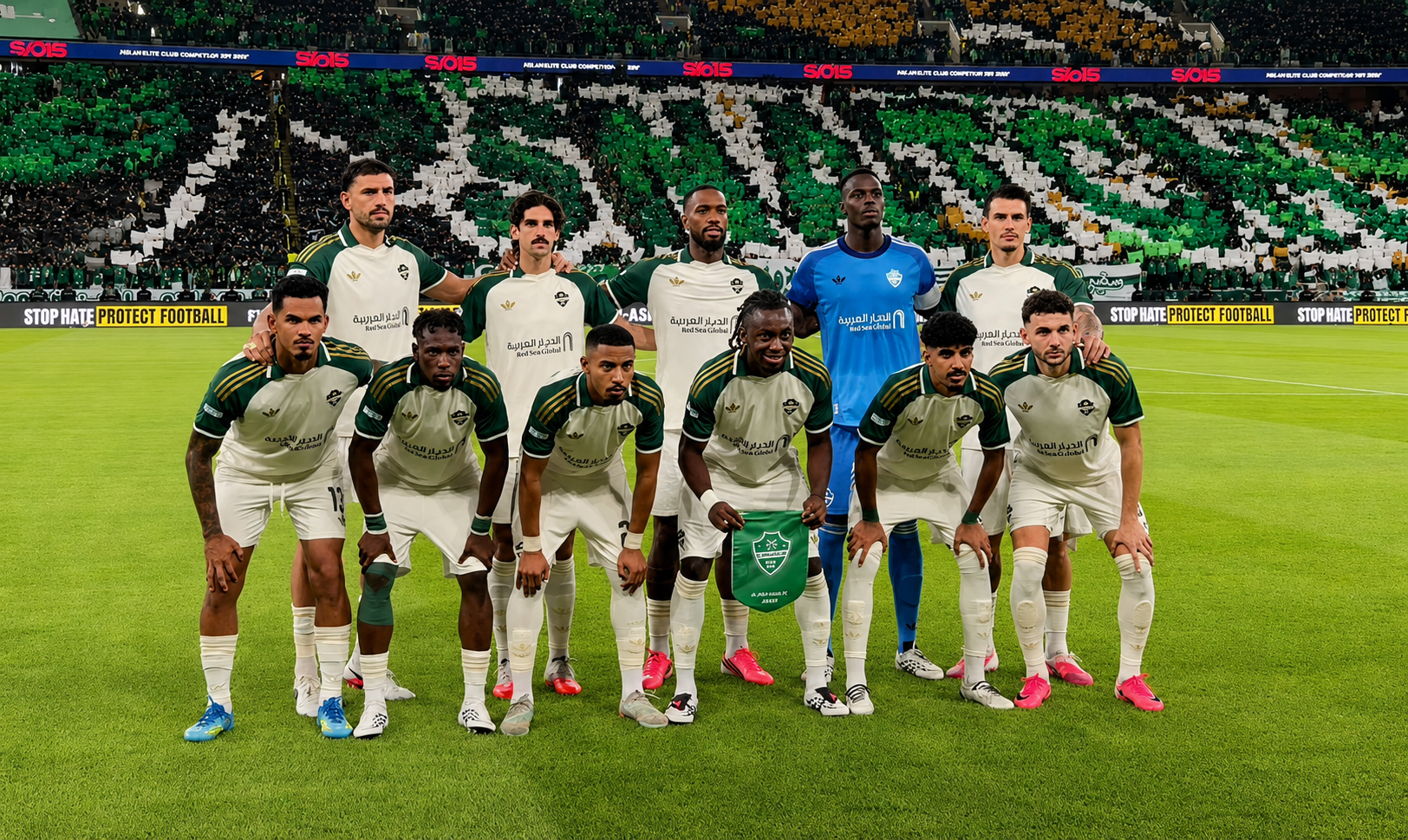
Al-Ahli squad in 2026

On 3 May 2025, Al-Ahli were crowned champions of the 2024–25 AFC Champions League Elite after defeating Japanese side Kawasaki Frontale in the final with a score of 2–0. The match was held at King Abdullah Sport City in Jeddah. Galeno scored the first goal at 35th minute with an out of the box shot to the top right corner, and Franck Kessie scored the second with a header at 42nd minute, the two goals were assisted by Roberto Firmino This marked Al-Ahli's first title in the AFC Champions League.

In 23 August 2025, Al-Ahli won the 2025 Saudi Super Cup, held in Hong Kong, after defeating Al-Nassr 5–3 on penalties following a 2–2 draw in the final. The victory marked the club’s second Super Cup title and their first since 2016.

Al-Ahli successfully defended their title in the 2025–26 AFC Champions League Elite, defeating Japanese side Machida Zelvia 1–0 after extra time in the final held at King Abdullah Sports City in Jeddah scored by Firas Al-Buraikan at 96th minute. This victory secured the club’s second continental title and marked their first back-to-back Asian championship, establishing Al-Ahli among the elite clubs in the history of Asian football.

=== Shield of Sports Excellence and the title of ambassador of the homeland ===
In 2009, the club celebrated its 75th anniversary. On 3 July 2009, the Custodian of the Two Holy Mosques King Abdullah bin Abdul Aziz received the heads and members of the honor of the club and its board of directors, on the occasion of Al-Ahli winning four International titles in 2008. The club was awarded the highest honor; it was presented with the shield of the Custodian of the Two Holy Mosques for sports excellence, and the title "Ambassador of the Homeland".

=== The Jeddah Derby ===
The Jeddah Derby refers to the rivalry between Al-Ahli and Al-Ittihad Club, the two major football clubs based in Jeddah. The fixture is one of the most prominent derbies in Saudi football, reflecting the city’s deep sporting culture and passionate fan bases. Matches between the two sides are regularly contested in domestic competitions such as the Saudi Pro League and the King’s Cup, often drawing large attendances and significant media attention. The rivalry dates back decades and is known for its intense atmosphere both on and off the pitch.

== Al-Ahli's relationship with Brazilian football ==
=== Matches with Brazil national team ===
In 1989, Al-Ahli hosted the Brazil national team in a friendly match at the Prince Abdullah Al-Faisal Stadium in Jeddah. Brazil won the match 3–1, with goals scored by Bebeto (two goals) and Washington, while Al-Ahli's only goal was scored by Al-Mualla.

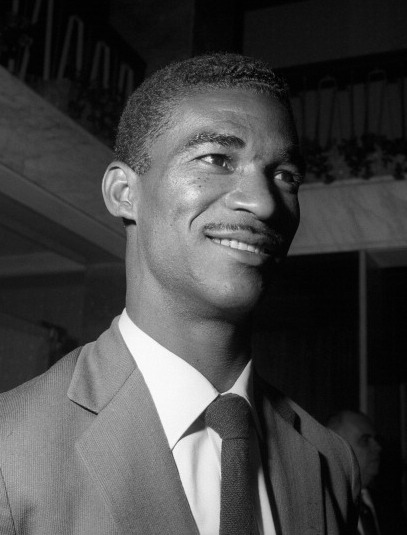
Didi Managed Al-Ahli in 1977–1981

The Brazilian national team also conducted official training sessions at Al-Ahli's facilities during their stay for the inaugural King Fahd Cup, which later evolved into the FIFA Confederations Cup.

In addition to the 1989 encounter, Al-Ahli faced Brazilian opposition again during the 1998 International Friendship Tournament (King Fahd Tournament), further strengthening the club's historical ties with Brazilian football.

=== Brazilian managers at Al-Ahli ===
Throughout its history, Al-Ahli has been managed by several prominent Brazilian coaches:

- Telê Santana: Managed Al-Ahli from 1983 to 1985, leading the team to win the Saudi Professional League title in 1984 and the King Cup in 1983.
- Luiz Felipe Scolari: Coached Al-Ahli during the 1991–1992 season.
- Didi: Managed Al-Ahli from 1977 to 1981 and secure win Saudi League and King Cup in 1977–78.

=== Brazilian players at Al-Ahli ===
Al-Ahli has also been home to several notable Brazilian players, including:

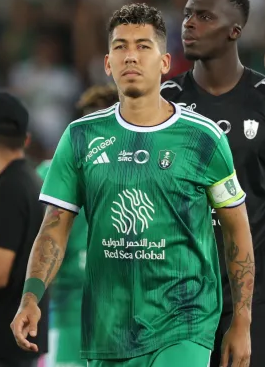
Firmino played Al-Ahli in 2023–2025

- Victor Simões joined Al-Ahli in 2010 and quickly became one of the most influential foreign strikers in the club’s history. During his three-year spell, he led the attack with consistent scoring and played a decisive role in Al-Ahli’s domestic dominance. He helped the club win the King Cup of Champions in 2011 and 2012 and finished as the Saudi Pro League top scorer in the 2011–12 season. One of his most memorable moments came in the 2012 AFC Champions League semifinal against Al-Ittihad, when he scored a 84th minute goal that secured Al-Ahli’s place in the final.
- Bruno César Joined in 2013 from Portuguese football and added technical quality to the midfield. His vision and long-range shooting helped Al-Ahli maintain competitiveness domestically and in Asia. During his time at the club, he contributed to the team’s Crown Prince Cup victory in 2015.
- Roberto Firmino signed in July 2023 after leaving Liverpool FC, becoming one of the most high-profile players in the club’s history. As captain and attacking leader, he played a central role in elevating the team’s global profile and on-field performance. Firmino helped guide Al-Ahli to continental success, culminating in the AFC Champions League Elite title in 2025.
- Roger Ibañez joined the club in 2023 and quickly established himself as the defensive cornerstone of the team. His strength, aerial ability, and tactical awareness strengthened Al-Ahli’s back line and were crucial during the club’s AFC Champions League Elite and Saudi Super Cup trophies in 2025.
- Galeno joined in 2025 and made an immediate impact, scoring in the final match, with his goal coming in the first half (around the 35th minute) to help secure the AFC Champions League Elite 2025 title.

== Honours ==
Al-Ahli Team has won 37 titles

Type	Competition	Titles	Seasons / Notes
Domestic	Saudi Pro League	9	1962–63 1965–66 1968–69 1970–71 1971–72 1972–73 1977–78, 1983–84, 2015–16
Domestic	Saudi First Division League	1	2022–23
Domestic	King's Cup	8	1969, 1977, 1978, 1979, 1983, 2011, 2012, 2016
Domestic	Saudi Super Cup	2	2016, 2025
Domestic	Crown Prince's Cup	6	1957, 1970, 1998, 2002, 2006–07, 2014–15
Domestic	Saudi Federation Cup	3	2001, 2002, 2007
Continental	AFC Champions League Elite	2	2024–25, 2025–26
Regional	Arab Champions League	1	2002–03
Regional	Gulf Club Champions Cup	3^{s}	1985, 2002, 2008
Regional	International Friendship Football Tournament	2	2001, 2002

- record
- ^{s} shared record

== Kits and crest ==
=== Kit suppliers and shirt sponsors ===
Period	Kit manufacturer	Shirt main sponsor
1978-1981	Admiral Sports	None
2001–2002	Le Coq Sportif	None
2002–2003	Diadora	None
2003–2006	Le Coq Sportif	None
2006–2008	Umbro	Al-Jawal
2008–2009	Umbro	STC
2009–2012	Adidas	STC
2012–2014	Umbro	STC
2014–2015	Umbro	Qatar Airways
2015–2017	Puma	Qatar Airways
2017–2019	Umbro	Saudia
2019–2020	S-Team	Saudia
2020–2023	Xtep	Saudia
2023–2026	Adidas	Red Sea Global (Note: Owned by Public Investment Fund)
2026–	Adidas	Amaala (Note: A Red Sea Global project, owned by Public Investment Fund)

== Players ==
As of 7 September 2026

Note: Flags indicate national team as defined under FIFA eligibility rules; some limited exceptions apply. Players may hold more than one non-FIFA nationality.

No.	Pos.	Nation	Player
1	GK	KSA	Abdulrahman Al-Sanbi
2	DF	KSA	Zakaria Hawsawi
3	DF	BRA	Roger Ibañez
4	MF	GUI	Ibrahima Diaby
5	DF	KSA	Mohammed Sulaiman
6	MF	FRA	Valentin Atangana
7	FW	POR	Francisco Trincão
8	MF	ARM	Eduard Spertsyan
9	FW	KSA	Firas Al-Buraikan
11	MF	KSA	Meshal Al-Mutairi
13	FW	BRA	Galeno
15	DF	KSA	Saeed Baattiah
16	GK	SEN	Édouard Mendy (captain)
17	FW	ENG	Ivan Toney
19	MF	UKR	Artem Bondarenko (on loan from Shakhtar Donetsk)
20	MF	BRA	Matheus Gonçalves

No.	Pos.	Nation	Player
21	FW	KSA	Abdullah Radif
23	MF	KSA	Ibrahim Azzam
24	DF	GAM	Abubacarr Sedi Kinteh
25	MF	KSA	Faisal Fallatah
27	DF	KSA	Ali Majrashi
28	DF	TUR	Merih Demiral
29	DF	KSA	Mohammed Abdulrahman
30	MF	KSA	Ziyad Al-Johani
31	DF	KSA	Saad Balobaid
46	DF	KSA	Rayan Hamed
47	MF	KSA	Saleh Abu Al-Shamat
49	FW	KSA	Salem Abdullah
62	GK	KSA	Abdullah Abdoh
66	MF	KSA	Naif Masoud
72	GK	KSA	Salman Al-Jadani
87	MF	KSA	Ramez Al-Attar

=== Out on loan ===
Note: Flags indicate national team as defined under FIFA eligibility rules; some limited exceptions apply. Players may hold more than one non-FIFA nationality.

No.	Pos.	Nation	Player
10	MF	FRA	Enzo Millot (at Al-Diriyah)
14	MF	KSA	Eid Al-Muwallad (at Al-Faisaly)
26	MF	KSA	Yaseen Al-Zubaidi (at Al-Kholood)
55	GK	KSA	Bader Kabli (at Al-Ain)

No.	Pos.	Nation	Player
60	DF	KSA	Yazan Madani (at Al-Kholood)
77	FW	BRA	Ricardo Mathias (at Al-Shabab)
88	DF	KSA	Abdulelah Al-Khaibari (at Al-Fateh)
95	MF	KSA	Ayman Fallatah (at Al-Faisaly)

== Records ==
=== Asian record ===
==== Overview ====
As of 25 April 2026

Competition	Pld	W	D	L	GF	GA
Asian Club Championship / AFC Champions League	128	67	30	31	226	148
Asian Cup Winners' Cup	4	3	0	1	9	3
TOTAL	132	70	30	32	235	151

==== Record by country ====
Country	Pld	W	D	L	GF	GA	GD	Win%
China	2	1	0	1	3	4	−1	50.00
India	1	1	0	0	2	1	+1	100.00
Indonesia	1	1	0	0	1	0	+1	100.00
Iran	26	12	6	8	41	35	+6	46.15
Iraq	8	7	0	1	24	6	+18	87.50
Japan	3	3	0	0	5	1	+4	100.00
Kuwait	1	1	0	0	2	1	+1	100.00
Malaysia	1	1	0	0	2	1	+1	100.00
Qatar	29	14	9	6	54	31	+23	48.28
Saudi Arabia	6	3	0	3	8	8	+0	50.00
South Korea	4	0	1	3	2	8	−6	0.00
Syria	7	5	2	0	12	2	+10	71.43
Tajikistan	1	1	0	0	1	0	+1	100.00
Thailand	1	1	0	0	3	0	+3	100.00
United Arab Emirates	28	12	11	5	52	38	+14	42.86
Uzbekistan	13	7	1	5	23	15	+8	53.85

==== Matches ====
The bold ones are the matches that Al-Ahli lost them.

Season	Competition	Round	Club	Home	Away	Aggregate
1985–86	Asian Club Championship	Group A	(India) East Bengal	2–1		1st
1985–86	Asian Club Championship	Group A	(Indonesia) KYTB	1–0		1st
1985–86	Asian Club Championship	SF	(Syria) Al-Ittihad Aleppo	1–0		1–0
1985–86	Asian Club Championship	Final	(South Korea) Daewoo Royals	1–3 (a.e.t.)		1–3
1999–2000	Asian Cup Winners' Cup	2Q	(Syria) Al-Jaish	1–0	2−0	3–0
1999–2000	Asian Cup Winners' Cup	QF	(Uzbekistan) Navbahor Namangan	6–1	0−2	6–3
1999–2000	Asian Cup Winners' Cup	SF	(Iraq) Al-Zawraa	–		Withdrew
2002–03	AFC Champions League	3Q	(United Arab Emirates) Al-Ahli	2–2	2−3	4–5
2005	AFC Champions League	Group D	(Iraq) Al-Zawraa	5–1	2−1	1st
2005	AFC Champions League	Group D	(Syria) Al-Jaish	3–1	4−0	1st
2005	AFC Champions League	Group D	(Uzbekistan) Pakhtakor	3–0	1−2	1st
2005	AFC Champions League	QF	(China) Shenzhen Jianlibao	2–1	1−3	3–4
2008	AFC Champions League	Group C	(Qatar) Al-Sadd	2–2	1−2	4th
2008	AFC Champions League	Group C	(Syria) Al-Karamah	1–1	0−0	4th
2008	AFC Champions League	Group C	(United Arab Emirates) Al-Wahda	0–0	1−2	4th
2010	AFC Champions League	Group A	(Iran) Esteghlal	1–2	1−2	3rd
2010	AFC Champions League	Group A	(Qatar) Al-Gharafa	0–1	2−3	3rd
2010	AFC Champions League	Group A	(United Arab Emirates) Al-Jazira	5–1	2−0	3rd
2012	AFC Champions League	Group C	(Qatar) Lekhwiya	3–0	0−1	2nd
2012	AFC Champions League	Group C	(Iran) Sepahan	1–1	1−2	2nd
2012	AFC Champions League	Group C	(United Arab Emirates) Al-Nasr	3–1	2−1	2nd
2012	AFC Champions League	R16	(United Arab Emirates) Al-Jazira	–	3−3 (a.e.t.)	3–3 (4–2 p)
2012	AFC Champions League	QF	(Iran) Sepahan	4–1	0−0	4–1
2012	AFC Champions League	SF	(Saudi Arabia) Al-Ittihad	2–0	0−1	2–1
2012	AFC Champions League	Final	(South Korea) Ulsan Hyundai	0–3		0–3
2013	AFC Champions League	Group C	(Qatar) Al-Gharafa	2–0	2−2	1st
2013	AFC Champions League	Group C	(United Arab Emirates) Al-Nasr	2–2	2−1	1st
2013	AFC Champions League	Group C	(Iran) Sepahan	4–1	4−2	1st
2013	AFC Champions League	R16	(Qatar) El Jaish	2−0	1−1	3–1
2013	AFC Champions League	QF	(South Korea) FC Seoul	1–1	0−1	1–2
2015	AFC Champions League	PO	(Kuwait) Al-Qadsia	2–1 (a.e.t.)	–	2–1
2015	AFC Champions League	Group D	(United Arab Emirates) Al-Ahli	2–1	3−3	1st
2015	AFC Champions League	Group D	(Uzbekistan) Nasaf Qarshi	2–1	0−0	1st
2015	AFC Champions League	Group D	(Iran) Tractor Sazi	2–0	2−2	1st
2015	AFC Champions League	R16	(Iran) Naft Tehran	2−1	0−1	2–2 (a)
2016	AFC Champions League	Group D	(Uzbekistan) Nasaf Qarshi	2–1	1−2	3rd
2016	AFC Champions League	Group D	(United Arab Emirates) Al-Ain	1–2	0−1	3rd
2016	AFC Champions League	Group D	(Qatar) El Jaish	2–0	4−1	3rd
2017	AFC Champions League	Group C	(Uzbekistan) Bunyodkor	2–0	0−2	2nd
2017	AFC Champions League	Group C	(Iran) Zob Ahan	2–0	2−1	2nd
2017	AFC Champions League	Group C	(United Arab Emirates) Al-Ain	2–2	2−2	2nd
2017	AFC Champions League	R16	(United Arab Emirates) Al-Ahli	1−1	3−1	4–2
2017	AFC Champions League	QF	(Iran) Persepolis	1–3	2−2	3–5
2018	AFC Champions League	Group A	(Iran) Tractor Sazi	2–0	1−0	1st
2018	AFC Champions League	Group A	(United Arab Emirates) Al-Jazira	2–1	2−1	1st
2018	AFC Champions League	Group A	(Qatar) Al-Gharafa	1–1	1−1	1st
2018	AFC Champions League	R16	(Qatar) Al-Sadd	2−2	1–2	3–4
2019	AFC Champions League	Group D	(Qatar) Al-Sadd	2–0	1−2	2nd
2019	AFC Champions League	Group D	(Uzbekistan) Pakhtakor	2–1	0−1	2nd
2019	AFC Champions League	Group D	(Iran) Persepolis	2–1	0−2	2nd
2019	AFC Champions League	R16	(Saudi Arabia) Al-Hilal	2–4	1–0	3–4
2020	AFC Champions League	PO	(Tajikistan) Istiklol	1–0	–	1–0
2020	AFC Champions League	Group A	(United Arab Emirates) Al-Wahda	–	1–1	1st
2020	AFC Champions League	Group A	(Iran) Esteghlal	2–1	0–3	1st
2020	AFC Champions League	Group A	(Iraq) Al-Shorta	1–0	1–2	1st
2020	AFC Champions League	R16	(United Arab Emirates) Shabab Al-Ahli	1–1 (a.e.t.)		1–1 (4–3 p)
2020	AFC Champions League	QF	(Saudi Arabia) Al-Nassr	0–2		0–2
2021	AFC Champions League	Group C	(Iran) Esteghlal	0–0	2–5	3rd
2021	AFC Champions League	Group C	(Qatar) Al-Duhail	1–1	1–1	3rd
2021	AFC Champions League	Group C	(Iraq) Al-Shorta	2–1	3–0	3rd
2024–25	AFC Champions League Elite	League stage	(Iran) Persepolis	1–0	—N/a	2nd
2024–25	AFC Champions League Elite	League stage	(United Arab Emirates) Al-Wasl	—N/a	2–0	2nd
2024–25	AFC Champions League Elite	League stage	(Qatar) Al-Rayyan	—N/a	2–1	2nd
2024–25	AFC Champions League Elite	League stage	(Iraq) Al-Shorta	5–1	—N/a	2nd
2024–25	AFC Champions League Elite	League stage	(United Arab Emirates) Al-Ain	—N/a	2–1	2nd
2024–25	AFC Champions League Elite	League stage	(Iran) Esteghlal	2–2	—N/a	2nd
2024–25	AFC Champions League Elite	League stage	(Qatar) Al-Sadd	—N/a	3–1	2nd
2024–25	AFC Champions League Elite	League stage	(Qatar) Al-Gharafa	4–2	—N/a	2nd
2024–25	AFC Champions League Elite	R16	(Qatar) Al-Rayyan	2–0	3–1	5–1
2024–25	AFC Champions League Elite	QF	(Thailand) Buriram United	3–0		3–0
2024–25	AFC Champions League Elite	SF	(Saudi Arabia) Al-Hilal	3–1		3–1
2024–25	AFC Champions League Elite	Final	(Japan) Kawasaki Frontale	2–0		2–0
2025–26	AFC Champions League Elite	League stage	(Uzbekistan) Nasaf	4–2	—N/a	2nd
2025–26	AFC Champions League Elite	League stage	(Qatar) Al-Duhail	—N/a	2–2	2nd
2025–26	AFC Champions League Elite	League stage	(Qatar) Al-Gharafa	4–0	—N/a	2nd
2025–26	AFC Champions League Elite	League stage	(Qatar) Al-Sadd	—N/a	2–1	2nd
2025–26	AFC Champions League Elite	League stage	(United Arab Emirates) Sharjah	0–1	—N/a	2nd
2025–26	AFC Champions League Elite	League stage	(Iraq) Al-Shorta	—N/a	5–0	2nd
2025–26	AFC Champions League Elite	League stage	(United Arab Emirates) Al Wahda	—N/a	0–0	2nd
2025–26	AFC Champions League Elite	League stage	(United Arab Emirates) Shabab Al Ahli	4–3	—N/a	2nd
2025–26	AFC Champions League Elite	R16	(Qatar) Al-Duhail	1–0 (a.e.t.)		1–0
2025–26	AFC Champions League Elite	QF	(Malaysia) Johor Darul Ta'zim	2–1		2–1
2025–26	AFC Champions League Elite	SF	(Japan) Vissel Kobe	2–1		2–1
2025–26	AFC Champions League Elite	Final	(Japan) Machida Zelvia	1–0 (a.e.t.)		1–0

==== Notes ====
- QR: Qualifying round
- 1Q: First qualifying round
- 2Q: Second qualifying round
- 3Q: Third qualifying round
- PO: Play-off round
- A After extra time.

==== Top scorers in Asian competitions ====
	Player	Country	Goals
1	Omar Al Somah	Syria	24
2	Victor Simões	Brazil	14
3	Riyad Mahrez	Algeria	13
4	Taisir Al-Jassim	Saudi Arabia	9
5	Amad Al-Hosni	Oman	8
5	Muhannad Assiri	Saudi Arabia	8
5	Ivan Toney	England	8
8	Galeno	Brazil	7
9	Abdulrahim Jaizawi	Saudi Arabia	6
9	Roberto Firmino	Brazil	6
9	Firas Al-Buraikan	Saudi Arabia	6

== Recent seasons ==
Season	Div.	Pos.	Pl.	W	D	L	GS	GA	GD	P	KC	CPC	PFC	ARCL	ACL	GCC	Saudi Super Cup
2000–01	SPL	1	22	15	6	1	50	19	31+	51	–	Quarter-finals	Winners	Semi-finals	–		–
2001–02	SPL	4	22	12	4	6	39	26	13+	40	–	Winners	Winners	–		Winners	–
2002–03	SPL	2	22	15	2	5	54	23	31+	47	–	Runners-up	Runners-up	Winners	3rd Qualifying Round	–	–
2003–04	SPL	4	22	10	8	4	31	21	10+	38	–	Runners-up	Group stage		–	–	–
2004–05	SPL	5	22	10	8	4	41	21	20+	34	–	Round 16	Semi-finals		Quarter-finals	–	–
2005–06	SPL	4	22	9	9	4	45	23	22+	36	–	Runners-up		–	–	–	–
2006–07	SPL	5	22	7	8	7	29	33	−4	29	–	Winners		Semi-finals	–	–	–
2007–08	SPL	8	22	7	5	10	30	31	−1	26	Quarter-finals	Semi-finals		–	Group stage	–	–
2008–09	SPL	3	22	11	7	4	33	20	+13	40	Quarter-finals	Round 16	Group stage	–	–	Winner	–
2009–10	ZPL	6	22	7	7	8	28	29	−1	28	Quarter-finals	Runners-up	Semi-finals	–	Group stage	–	–
2010–11	ZPL	6	26	11	4	11	48	41	+7	37	Winners	Quarter-final	Runners-up	–	–	–	–
2011–12	ZPL	2	26	19	5	2	60	22	+38	62	Winners	Semi-final	Winners	–	Runners-up	–	–
2012–13	ZPL	5	26	12	8	6	51	33	+18	44	Semi-finals	Quarter-finals	Winners	–	Quarter-finals	–	–
2013–14	ALJ	3	26	12	9	5	48	24	+24	45	Runners-up	Quarter-finals	Runners-up	–	–	–	–
2014–15	ALJ	2	26	17	9	0	59	22	+37	60	Round 16	Winners	–	–	Round 16	–	–
2015–16	ALJ	1	26	19	6	1	55	21	+34	63	Winners	Runners-up	–	–	Group stages	–	–
2016–17	ALJ	2	26	17	4	5	57	30	+27	55	Runners-up	Semi-finals	–	–	Quarter-finals	–	Winners
2017–18	SPL	2	26	16	7	3	59	26	+33	55	Semi-finals	–	–	–	Round of 16	–	–
2018–19	SPL	4	30	17	4	9	68	41	+27	55	Round of 16	–	–	Semi-finals	Round of 16	–	–
2019–20	SPL	3	30	15	5	10	49	36	+13	50	Semi-finals	–	–	–	Quarter-finals	–	–
2020–21	SPL	8	30	9	9	12	42	47	–5	39	Round of 16	–	–	–	Group stages	–	–
2021–22	SPL	15	30	6	14	10	38	43	–5	32	Quarter-finals	–	–	–	–	–	–
2022–23	FDL	1	34	21	9	4	48	24	+24	72	–	–	–	–	–	–	–
2023–24	SPL	3	34	19	8	7	67	35	+32	65	Round of 16	–	–	–	–	–	–
2024–25	SPL	5	34	21	4	9	69	36	+33	67	Round of 32	–	–	–	Winners	–	Winners

== Player of the year ==
Year	Winner
2009–10	(Saudi Arabia) Abdulrahim Jaizawi
2010–11	(Brazil) Victor Simões
2011–12	(Saudi Arabia) Taisir Al-Jassim
2012–13	(Saudi Arabia) Mustafa Al-Bassas
2013–14	(Saudi Arabia) Taisir Al-Jassim
2014–15	(Syria) Omar Al Soma
2015–16	(Syria) Omar Al Soma
2016–17	(Saudi Arabia) Yasser Al-Mosailem
2017–18	(Syria) Omar Al Soma
2018–19	(Cape Verde) Djaniny
2019–20	(Syria) Omar Al Soma
2020–21	(Syria) Omar Al Soma
2021–22	(Syria) Omar Al Soma
2022–23	(Algeria) Ryad Boudebouz

== Staff and management ==
=== Technical staff ===
Position	Nat.	Name
Head coach	(Bosnia and Herzegovina) (Netherlands)	Marino Pušić
Assistant coach	(Netherlands)	Chris van der Weerden
Goalkeeper coach	(Netherlands)	Raimond van der Gouw
Performance coach	(Belgium)	Roel Tambour
Chief analyst	(Egypt)	Mohamed Abdelfattah
Video analyst	(Thailand)	Athikun Pinthong
Match analysts	(England)	Daniel Nisbet
Director of football	(Saudi Arabia)	Naif Qadi
Technical director	(Belgium)	Jan van Winckel

=== Board members ===
Office	Name
President	Khalid Al Ghamdi
Vice-president	Khalid Al Hendi
Chief Executive Officer	Ron Gourlay
Director of Other Sports	Khalid Al Shafei
Director of Legal Affairs	Mohammed bin Laden
Commercial Director	Abdulaziz Al Anqari
Investment Officer	Ayman Al Rashed
Board Member	Osama Shaker
Board Member	Muhannad Al Blahid

== Presidents ==
No	Name	From	To
1	(Saudi Arabia) Hassan Hamood Al-Shams	1937	1940
2	(Saudi Arabia) Omar Hamood Al-Shams	1950	1952
3	(Saudi Arabia) Hassan Saroor Al Sabyan	1952	1954
4	(Saudi Arabia) Abdullah Bahery	1955	1955
5	(Saudi Arabia) Omar Hamood Al Shams	1956	1956
6	(Saudi Arabia) Ali Al Jassem Al Na'kly	1957	1957
7	(Saudi Arabia) Mohammed Fashlan	1958	1958
8	(Saudi Arabia) Abdulrahman bin Saead	1959	1960
9	(Saudi Arabia) Jameel Al-Gosani	1961	1961
10	(Saudi Arabia) Abdulfatah Abdulrabho	1962	1962
11	(Saudi Arabia) Abdullah Al-Bahry	1963	1963
12	(Saudi Arabia) Abdulfatah Abdulrabho	1964	1964
13	(Saudi Arabia) Omar Yousef	1965	1969
14	(Saudi Arabia) Mohammed bin Saleh Hamed	1970	1972
15	(Saudi Arabia) Abdullah bin Al-Ganb	1973	1974
16	(Saudi Arabia) Abdulmageed Yousef	1975	1975
17	(Saudi Arabia) Khaled bin Abdullah	1976	1980
18	(Saudi Arabia) Abdullah bin Faisal	1981	1981
19	(Saudi Arabia) Mohammed bin Abdullah bin Faisal	1982	1984
20	(Saudi Arabia) Abdulraziq Abu Dawod	1985	1986
21	(Saudi Arabia) Ahmed Eid Al-Harbi	1987	1987
22	(Saudi Arabia) Khaled bin Abdullah	1988	1994
23	(Saudi Arabia) Abdullah bin Faisal bin Turki	1994	1995
24	(Saudi Arabia) Badr bin Fahd	1995	1996
25	(Saudi Arabia) Zaki Raheme	1996	1997
26	(Saudi Arabia) Abdulaziz Abdulha'a	1997	1998
27	(Saudi Arabia) Salman Al-Sudairy	1998	1998
28	(Saudi Arabia) Nawaf bin Abdulaziz bin Turki	1999	2003
29	(Saudi Arabia) Ahmed Moahmmed Marzoqi	2004	2005
30	(Saudi Arabia) Abdulraziq abu Dawod	2005	2005
31	(Saudi Arabia) Aymin Fadel	2005	2007
32	(Saudi Arabia) Abdulraziq abu Dawod	2007	2007
33	(Saudi Arabia) Ahmed Moahmmed Marzoqi	2007	2008
34	(Saudi Arabia) Abdulaziz Mohammed Al-A'aqary	2008	2009
35	(Saudi Arabia) Fahd bin Khaled bin Abdullah bin Mohammed	2009	2015
36	(Saudi Arabia) Musad Al Zuwaihary	2015	2016
37	(Saudi Arabia) Ahmad Al-Marzouqi	2016	2017
38	(Saudi Arabia) Fahd bin Khaled bin Abdullah bin Mohammed	2017	2017
39	(Saudi Arabia) Turki bin Mohammed	2017	2018
40	(Saudi Arabia) Majed Al-Nefaie	2018	2018
41	(Saudi Arabia) Abdullah Batterjee	2019	2019
42	(Saudi Arabia) Ahmed Al-Sayegh	2019	2020
43	(Saudi Arabia) Abdulelah Mouminah	2020	2021
44	(Saudi Arabia) Majed Al-Nefaie	2021	2022
45	(Saudi Arabia) Waleed Muath	2022	2023
46	(Saudi Arabia) Khalid Al Ghamdi	2023	

== Managers ==
- (Tunisia) Mohammed Amin Hilmi (1937–39), (1950–51)
- (Saudi Arabia) Abdullah Abdul Majid (1961–65), (1969–71), (1976–77)
- (Saudi Arabia) Ahmed Saleh Al Yafei (1961–65), (1976–77)
- (England) Mr. Michael (1967)
- (England) Oscar Hold (1967–70)
- (Sudan) Hassan Sadaqa (1970–xx)
- (Egypt) Taha Ismail (1972–76)
- (Brazil) Didi (1978–81)
- (Brazil) Jorge Vieira (1980–81)
- (Brazil) Carlos the Jackal (1981–82)
- (Brazil) Telê Santana (1983–85)
- (Egypt) Mahmoud El-Gohary (1985, 1986–88)
- (Tunisia) Ahmed Bouajila (1985–1986)
- (Germany) Eckhard Krautzun (1988–89)
- (Brazil) Sebastião Lazaroni (1989–90)
- (Brazil) Zanata (1990, 1997)
- (Brazil) Xanana (1990–91), (1998–99), (2000–01)
- (Brazil) Luiz Felipe Scolari (1992–93)
- (Tunisia) Nabil Maaloul (1994)
- (Germany) Peter Shtoob (1994)
- (Saudi Arabia) Ahmed Al-Saghir (1994–95)
- (Brazil) Márcio Máximo (1995)
- (Brazil) Luís Antônio Zaluar (1995–96)
- (Brazil) Vantuir (1996–97)
- (Brazil) Cabralzinho (3 Oct 1998 – 3 Dec 1998)
- (Saudi Arabia) Amin Dabo (3 Dec 1998 – 21 Nov 1999)
- (Brazil) Zanata (21 Nov 1999 – 31 May 2000)
- (Argentina) Miguel Ángel López (22 Jun 2000 – 11 Oct 2000)
- (Croatia) Luka Peruzović (12 Oct 2000 – 11 Apr 2002)
- (Saudi Arabia) Yousef Anbar (caretaker) (11 Apr 2002 – 31 May 2002, 19 Nov 2005 – 22 Dec 2005, 2 Oct 2007 – 22 Oct 2007, 6 Apr 2008 – 22 May 2008, 4 Sep 2022 – 25 Sep 2022)
- (Belgium) Dimitri Davidovic (21 Jun 2002 – 4 Jan 2003)
- (Serbia) Ilija Lukić (4 Jan 2003 – 1 Jun 2003, 30 Jul 2005 – 19 Nov 2005)
- (France) Pierre Lechantre (15 Jul 2003 – 30 Sep 2003)
- (Brazil) Valmir Louruz (6 Oct 2003 – 20 Dec 2004)
- (Brazil) Geninho (25 Dec 2004 – 17 Jul 2005)
- (Serbia) Nebojsa Vučković (22 Dec 2005 – 22 May 2007, 22 Oct 2007 – 6 Apr 2008)
- (Germany) Theo Bücker (30 May 2007 – 2 Oct 2007)
- (Bulgaria) Stoycho Mladenov (7 July 2008 – 8 May 2009)
- (Argentina) Gustavo Alfaro (1 June 2009 – 25 Nov 2009)
- (France) Alan Guido (caretaker) (25 Nov 2009 – 25 Dec 2009)
- (Brazil) Sérgio Farias (25 Dec 2009 – 1 Jul 2010)
- (Norway) Trond Sollied (1 Jul 2010 – 28 Aug 2010)
- (Tunisia) Khaled Badra (caretaker) (28 Aug 2010 – Sept 10, 2010)
- (Serbia) Milovan Rajevac (Sept 10, 2010 – 20 Feb 2011)
- (Serbia) Aleksandar Ilić (24 Feb 2011 – 30 Jun 2011, 28 Feb 2013 – 31 May 2013)
- (Czech Republic) Karel Jarolím (5 Aug 2011 – 28 Feb 2013)
- (Portugal) Vítor Pereira (9 Jun 2013 – 5 May 2014)
- (Switzerland) Christian Gross (16 Jun 2014 – 30 May 2016)
- (Portugal) José Manuel Gomes (31 May 2016 – 30 Sep 2016)
- (Switzerland) Christian Gross (3 Oct 2016 – 31 May 2017)
- (Ukraine) Serhiy Rebrov (21 Jun 2017 – 17 May 2018)
- (Tunisia) Fathi Al-Jabal (19 Apr 2018 – 15 May 2018)
- (Argentina) Pablo Guede (15 May 2018 – 5 Feb 2019)
- (Uruguay) Jorge Fossati (8 Feb 2019 – 17 Apr 2019)
- (Saudi Arabia) Yousef Anbar (17 Apr 2019 – 21 May 2019)
- (Croatia) Branko Ivanković (18 Jun 2019 – 16 Sep 2019)
- (Saudi Arabia) Saleh Al-Mohammadi (caretaker) (16 Sep 2019 – 16 Oct 2019)
- (Switzerland) Christian Gross (16 Oct 2019 – 17 Feb 2020)
- (Saudi Arabia) Mazen Bahkali (caretaker) (17 Feb 2020 – 28 Feb 2020)
- (Serbia) Vladan Milojević (28 Feb 2020 – 24 Mar 2021)
- (France) Faiçal Gormi (caretaker) (24 Mar 2021 – 31 Mar 2021)
- (Romania) Laurențiu Reghecampf (31 Mar 2021 – 31 May 2021)
- (Albania) Besnik Hasi (6 Jun 2021 – 4 Mar 2022)
- (Uruguay) Robert Siboldi (5 Mar 2022 – 4 Sep 2022)
- (South Africa) Pitso Mosimane (25 Sep 2022 – 15 June 2023)
- (Germany) Matthias Jaissle (28 Jul 2023 – 5 Aug 2026)
- (Bosnia and Herzegovina) Marino Pušić (6 Aug 2026 – )

== See also ==
- List of football clubs in Saudi Arabia
