= Oumar Traoré (Senegalese footballer) =

Senegalese footballer

Personal information
- Date of birth: 27 February 1975 (age 51)
- Position: Midfielder

Senior career*
Years	Team	Apps	(Gls)
- ASC Jaraaf
- Al-Riyadh
- Al-Wehda
- Al-Riyadh
- Al-Najma
- ASC Jaraaf
	AEK Larnaca	30	(1)

International career
1996–2000	Senegal	25	(5)
- * Club domestic league appearances and goals

Oumar Traoré (born 27 February 1975) is a Senegalese former professional footballer who played as a midfielder. He made 25 appearances for the Senegal national team from 1996 to 2000. He was also named in Senegal's squad for the 2000 African Cup of Nations tournament.
