= 1977–78 Saudi Premier League =

Premier League
- Season: 1977–78
- Champions: Al-Ahli (1st title)
- Relegated: Ohod; Al-Shabab
- Top goalscorer: (Saudi Arabia) Motamad Khojali (14 goals)

The 1977–78 season was the second season of the Saudi Premier League.

== Overview ==
The league was expanded to include ten teams, again playing on a home and away basis. Al-Ahli won the championship and took the title to Jeddah for the first time.

Both Ohod and Al-Shabab were relegated.

== Clubs ==
=== Stadia and locations ===
Locations of teams in the 1977–78 Saudi Premier League

Club	Location	Stadium	Head coach
Al-Ahli	Jeddah	Prince Abdullah Al-Faisal Stadium	(Brazil) Didi
Al-Ettifaq	Dammam	Prince Mohamed bin Fahd Stadium	(Saudi Arabia) Khalil Al-Zayani
Al-Hilal	Riyadh	Prince Faisal bin Fahd Stadium	(Brazil) Paulo Amaral
Al-Ittihad	Jeddah	Prince Abdullah Al-Faisal Stadium	(Tunisia) Jamel Eddine Bouabsa
Al-Nahda	Khobar	Prince Saud bin Jalawi Stadium	
Al-Nassr	Riyadh	Prince Faisal bin Fahd Stadium	(Socialist Federal Republic of Yugoslavia) Ljubiša Broćić
Al-Qadsiah	Khobar	Prince Saud bin Jalawi Stadium	
Al-Shabab	Riyadh	Prince Faisal bin Fahd Stadium	(Egypt) Saleh El Wahsh
Al-Wehda	Mecca	King Abdul Aziz Stadium	(Tunisia) Redha Al Sayeh
Ohod	Medina	Education Stadium	(Egypt) Mohieddine Sharshar

=== Foreign players ===
Club	Player 1	Former players
Al-Ahli		
Al-Ettifaq		
Al-Hilal	(Tunisia) Ali Kaabi	
Al-Ittihad		
Al-Nahda		
Al-Nassr		
Al-Qadsiah		
Al-Shabab	(Morocco) Jawad El Andaloussi	
Al-Wehda		
Ohod		

== League table ==
Pos	Team	Pld	Pts
1	Al-Ahli	18	29
2	Al-Nassr	18	28
3	Al-Ettifaq	18	21
4	Al-Ittihad	18	19
5	Al-Qadsiah	18	18
6	Al-Hilal	18	17
7	Al-Nahda	18	17
8	Al-Wehda	18	16
9	Al-Shabab	18	8
10	Ohod	18	7

Source: rsssf.com
- Promoted: Al-Tai, Al-Riyadh
- Full records are not known at this time

Saudi Premier League
1977–78 winners

1st title
