= Jorge Mendonça =

Jorge Mendonça may refer to:

- Jorge Mendonça (footballer, born 1938), Angolan footballer
- Jorge Mendonça (footballer, born 1954) (1954–2006), Brazilian footballer
