= 1978 King Cup =

Tournament details
- Country: Saudi Arabia
- Dates: 30 March – 21 April 1978
- Teams: 32

Final positions
- Champions: Al-Ahli (8th title)
- Runners-up: Al-Riyadh

Tournament statistics
- Matches played: 31
- Goals scored: 121 (3.9 per match)
- Top goal scorer: Amin Dabo (7 goals)

The 1978 King Cup was the 20th season of the knockout competition since its establishment in 1956. Al-Ahli were the defending champions and successfully defended the title, winning their second one in a row. Al-Ahli beat Al-Riyadh who became the first First Division side to reach the final.

By winning both the 1977–78 Saudi Premier League and the 1978 King Cup, Al-Ahli became the first Saudi team to achieve the domestic double.

== Bracket ==
Round of 32
H	Al-Ahli	9
A	Al-Jazeera	0
H	Al-Nassr	3
A	Al-Shate'e	0
H	Al-Wehda	6
A	Al-Kawkab	0
H	Al-Rabe'e	2
A	Al-Hada	3
H	Al-Qadsiah	2
A	Al-Shoulla	0
H	Al-Hilal	2
A	Al-Arabi	1
H	Al-Ittihad	2
A	Al-Jabalain	0
H	Ohod	7
A	Al-Fayha	0
H	Al-Riyadh	3
A	Al-Nakhil	0
H	Al-Ansar	4
A	Damac	0
H	Al-Shabab (a.e.t.)	4
A	Al-Khaleej	1
H	Hajer	2
A	Al-Taawoun	1
H	Al-Nahda	4
A	Al-Majd	0
H	Al-Tai	1
A	Okaz	0
H	Al-Ettifaq	14
A	Al-Tadamon	1
H	Al-Wadea	9
A	Tuwaiq	0

Round of 16
H	Al-Ahli	1
A	Al-Nassr	0
H	Al-Wehda	6
A	Al-Hada	0
A	Al-Qadsiah	2
H	Al-Hilal	1
H	Al-Ittihad	1
A	Ohod	0
A	Al-Riyadh	3
H	Al-Ansar	2
H	Al-Shabab	1
A	Hajer	0
H	Al-Nahda (pen.)	2 (3)
A	Al-Tai	2 (2)
H	Al-Ettifaq	4
A	Al-Wadea	0

Quarter-finals
H	Al-Ahli (a.e.t.)	3
A	Al-Wehda	0
A	Al-Qadsiah	3
H	Al-Ittihad	1
H	Al-Riyadh (pen.)	1 (4)
A	Al-Shabab	1 (1)
H	Al-Nahda	1
A	Al-Ettifaq	0

Semi-finals
A	Al-Ahli	2
H	Al-Qadsiah	1
A	Al-Riyadh	1
H	Al-Nahda	0

Final
–	Al-Ahli	1
–	Al-Riyadh	0

Source: Bracket

== Round of 32 ==
The matches of the Round of 32 were held on 30 and 31 March 1978.

Home team	Score	Away team
Al-Nassr	3–0	Al-Shate'e
Al-Ittihad	2–0	Al-Jabalain
Al-Tai	1–0	Okaz
Hajer	2–1	Al-Taawoun
Ohod	7–0	Al-Fayha
Al-Qadsiah	2–0	Al-Shoulla
Al-Ahli	9–0	Al-Jazeera
Al-Nahda	4–0	Al-Majd
Al-Riyadh	3–0	Al-Nakhil
Al-Wadea	9–0	Tuwaiq
Al-Rabe'e	2–3	Al-Hada
Al-Wehda	6–0	Al-Kawkab
Al-Ettifaq	14–1	Al-Tadamon
Al-Shabab	4–1 (a.e.t.)	Al-Khaleej
Al-Hilal	2–1	Al-Arabi
Al-Ansar	4–0	Damac

== Round of 16 ==
The Round of 16 matches were held on 5 and 6 April 1978.

Home team	Score	Away team
Al-Hilal	1–2	Al-Qadsiah
Al-Ittihad	1–0	Ohod
Al-Ettifaq	4–0	Al-Wadea
Al-Wehda	6–0	Al-Hada
Al-Shabab	1–0	Hajer
Al-Nahda	2–2 (3–2 pen.)	Al-Tai
Al-Ansar	2–3	Al-Riyadh
Al-Ahli	1–0	Al-Nassr

== Quarter-finals ==
The Quarter-final matches were held on 11 and 12 April 1978.

Home team	Score	Away team
Al-Nahda	1–0	Al-Ettifaq
Al-Ittihad	1–3	Al-Qadsiah
Al-Ahli	3–0 (a.e.t.)	Al-Wehda
Al-Riyadh	1–1 (4–1 pen.)	Al-Shabab

== Semi-finals ==
The four winners of the quarter-finals progressed to the semi-finals. The semi-finals were played on 16 April 1978. All times are local, AST (UTC+3).

16 April 1978
16:30

Al-Qadsiah	1–2	Al-Ahli
A. Al-Sagheer 39'	Report	Eid 57'; Dabo 89'

Youth Welfare Stadium in Dammam, Dammam
Referee: Abdullah Al-Mawzan
16 April 1978
20:30

Al-Nahda	0–1	Al-Riyadh
	Report	Al-Joaithin pen'

Youth Welfare Stadium in Dammam, Dammam

== Final ==
The final was played between Al-Ahli and Al-Riyadh in the Youth Welfare Stadium in Riyadh. By reaching the final Al-Riyadh became the first First Division side to reach the final. This final was a repeat of the 1962 final which ended in a win for Al-Ahli.

21 April 1978
16:30 (UTC+3)

Al-Ahli	1–0	Al-Riyadh
Khojali 27'	Report

Youth Welfare Stadium in Al-Malaz, Riyadh
Referee: Fahad Al-Dahmash
