= Túlio (footballer, born 1976) =

Brazilian footballer

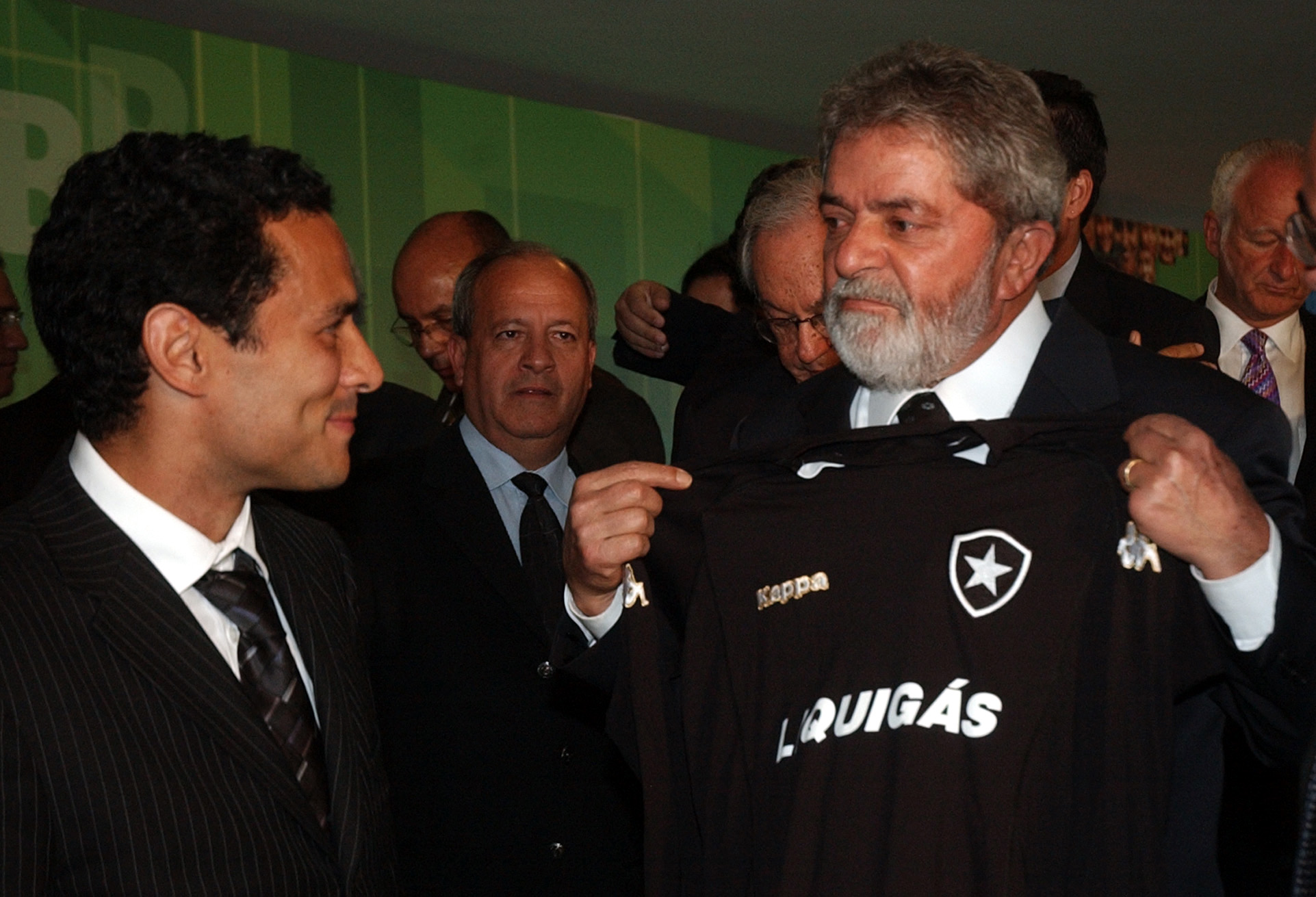

Personal information
- Full name: Túlio Lustosa Seixas Pinheiro
- Date of birth: April 25, 1976 (age 50)
- Place of birth: Brasília, Brazil
- Height: 1.75 m (5 ft 9 in)
- Position: Defensive midfielder

Youth career
- 1993–1994: Goiás

Senior career*
Years	Team	Apps	(Gls)
1995–2000	Goiás	78	(3)
2001–2002	Al-Hilal	12	(1)
2002	Goiás	20	(0)
2003–2005	Botafogo	48	(4)
2005–2006	Oita Trinita	44	(3)
2007–2008	Botafogo	54	(7)
2009	Corinthians	0	(0)
2009	Grêmio	32	(0)
2010	Goiás	0	(0)
2010–2012	Figueirense	73	(0)
2013	Sobradinho	0	(0)
Total		361	(18)
- * Club domestic league appearances and goals

Túlio Lustosa Seixas Pinheiro or simply Túlio (born April 25, 1976 in Brasília, Brazil), is a retired Brazilian defensive midfielder.

== Club statistics ==
Club performance			League		Cup		League Cup		Total	
Season	Club	League	Apps	Goals	Apps	Goals	Apps	Goals	Apps	Goals
Brazil			League		Copa do Brasil		League Cup		Total	
1995	Goiás	Série A	2	0					2	0
1996	Goiás	Série A	11	1					11	1
1997	Goiás	Série A	21	1					21	1
1998	Goiás	Série A	21	1					21	1
1999	Goiás	Série B								
2000	Goiás	Série A	21	0					21	0
2001	Goiás	Série A	24	1					24	1
Saudi Arabia			League		Crown Prince Cup		League Cup		Total	
2001/02	Al-Hilal	Professional League								
Brazil			League		Copa do Brasil		League Cup		Total	
2002	Goiás	Série A	20	0					20	0
2003	Botafogo	Série B								
2004	Botafogo	Série A	35	1					35	1
2005	Botafogo	Série A	14	3					14	3
Japan			League		Emperor's Cup		J.League Cup		Total	
2005	Oita Trinita	J1 League	14	1	2	0	0	0	16	1
2006	Oita Trinita	J1 League	30	2	2	0	6	0	38	2
Brazil			League		Copa do Brasil		League Cup		Total	
2007	Botafogo	Série A	24	2					24	2
2008	Botafogo	Série A	29	5					29	5
2009	Corinthians Paulista	Série A								
2009	Grêmio	Série A	32	0					32	0
2010	Figueirense	Série B	15	0					15	0
2011	Figueirense	Série A	30	0					30	0
2012	Figueirense	Série A	28	0					28	0
Country	Brazil		327	15					327	15
Country	Saudi Arabia									
Country	Japan		44	3	4	0	6	0	54	3
Total			371	18	4	0	6	0	381	18

== Honours ==
- Goiás State League: 1996, 1997, 1998, 1999, 2000, 2003
- Brazilian Center-West Cup: 2000
- Rio de Janeiro's Cup: 2007

== Contract ==
- 1 January 2008 to 31 December 2010
