= Isaac Kwakye =

Ghanaian footballer

Personal information
- Date of birth: May 6, 1978 (age 48)
- Place of birth: Accra, Ghana
- Height: 1.76 m (5 ft 9 in)
- Position: Attacking midfielder

Youth career
- Asante Kotoko

Senior career*
Years	Team	Apps	(Gls)
1993–1999	Asante Kotoko		
1999–2003	Al-Najma		
2003–2004	Asante Kotoko		
2004–2007	PFC Beroe Stara Zagora	79	(12)
- * Club domestic league appearances and goals as of June 2006 ‡ National team caps and goals as of 16 October 2008

Isaac Kwakye (born May 6, 1978, in Accra) is a Ghanaian football attacking midfielder.

== Career ==
Kwakye began his career by Al-Najma before scouted from Asante Kotoko, before in 2004 leaving the club with a move to PFC Beroe Stara Zagora. After 3 years he left Beroe.

- 1993–1999 Asante Kotoko
- 1999–2003 Al-Najma
- 2001–2004 Asante Kotoko
- 2004–2007 Beroe
