= Gildo Rodrigues =

Brazilian football manager (1939–2009)

Personal information
- Date of birth: 30 November 1939
- Place of birth: Rio de Janeiro, Brazil
- Date of death: 17 August 2009 (aged 69)
- Place of death: Rio de Janeiro, Brazil

Managerial career
- Years: Team
- 1974: Portuguesa da Ilha
- 1977: Ghana
- 1978–1979: São Cristóvão
- 1979–1985: Al-Salmiya
- 1986: Liberia
- 1987: Porto Alegre
- 1987: Sampaio Corrêa
- 1989–1991: Al-Riyadh
- 1991–1992: Al-Ahli (Manama)
- 1992–1994: Al-Salmiya
- 1993: Kuwait
- 1995–1996: Al-Wahda
- 1998–1999: Al-Nahda
- 2000: Guangzhou Apollo
- 2003: Al Najmah
- 2004: FK Vardar
- 2006–2007: Persebaya Surabaya

Gildo Rodrigues (30 November 1939 – 17 August 2009) was a Brazilian football manager.

Rodrigues firstly acted as a fitness coach at Madureira between 1967 and 1969. He became a manager in 1974, coaching Portuguesa. In his managerial career, he mainly coached football clubs in the Middle East. However, the last club he managed was Indonesian side Persebaya Surabaya, with whom his son, Stefano Cugurra, started his backroom career.

Rodrigues died on 17 August 2009, aged 69.

== Honours ==
Al-Salmiya

- Kuwaiti Premier League: 1981
- Kuwait Emir Cup: 1993

Sampaio Corrêa

- Campeonato Maranhense: 1987
