= Lindomar (footballer) =

Brazilian footballer

Personal information
- Full name: Lindomar de Paula Queiroz
- Date of birth: 20 May 1970 (age 56)
- Place of birth: Inhumas, Brazil
- Height: 1.74 m (5 ft 9 in)
- Position: Midfielder

Youth career
- 1987–1991: Atlético Goianiense

Senior career*
Years	Team	Apps	(Gls)
1990–1996	Atlético Goianiense		
1996–1997	Corinthians	10	(2)
1997	Goiânia		
1997–1998	Atlético Goianiense		
1998	Anápolis		
1998	Jataiense		
1999–2000	Gama		
2000–2001	Guarani		
2001	Gama		
2002	Al-Ittihad		
2002–2003	Gama		
2003–2004	Al-Shabab		
2004–2005	Ponte Preta		
2005	Brasiliense		
2005	Náutico		
2006	Al-Qadsiah		
2006	Atlético Goianiense		
2006–2007	Gama		
2007–2010	Atlético Goianiense		
2010	Aparecidense		
- * Club domestic league appearances and goals

Lindomar de Paula Queiroz (born 20 May 1970), simply known as Lindomar, is a Brazilian former professional footballer who played as a midfielder.

== Career ==
Lindomar started his at Atlético Goianiense, playing the first mid of the 90s at the club. He was traded to Corinthians where he was part of the 1997 state champion squad. He was part of the Gama team that played in the Campeonato Brasileiro Série A and there he also achieved a three-time the Campeonato Brasiliense. He played for some clubs in Saudi Arabia, most notably Al-Shabab, where he was national champion.

He returned to Brazil playing for other clubs, and was again champion of the Campeonato Brasileiro Série C at Atlético Goianiense in 2008. Lindomar ended his career at AA Aparecidense in 2010.

== Honours ==
Atlético Goianiense

- Campeonato Brasileiro Série C: 1990, 2008
- Campeonato Goiano: 2007

Corinthians

- Campeonato Paulista: 1997

Gama

- Campeonato Brasiliense: 1999, 2000, 2001

Al-Shabab

- Saudi Premier League: 2003–04

Aparecidense

- Campeonato Goiano Second Division: 2010
