= Al-Najma SC (Saudi Arabia) =

Association football club in Saudi Arabia

Coordinates: 26°5′43″N 44°2′53″E

- Full name: Al-Najma Sport Club
- Nickname: Nejmeh Unaizah (The Star of Unaizah)
- Founded: 1960; 66 years ago
- Ground: Al-Najma Club Stadium; Unaizah, Saudi Arabia
- Capacity: 3,000
- Chairman: Ibrahim Al-Sufi
- Head coach: Jorge Mendonça
- League: Saudi First Division League
- 2025–26: Pro League, 18th of 18 (relegated)
- Website: alnajmahfc.com
Home colours	Away colours

Al-Najma Sport Club (Arabic: نادي النجمة الرياضي, lit. 'The Star') is a Saudi Arabian football team based in Unaizah that competes in the Saudi Pro League.

Al-Najma has a fierce rivalry with local club Al-Arabi, which is usually manifested in the Unaizah Derby.

== History ==
The best achievement by the team, is finished third for the Saudi Premier League 1997–98 And entering the semi-finals.

== Honours ==
Saudi First Division League

- Winners (2): 1989–90, 1993–94
- Runners-up (1): 1991–92

== Current staff ==
Position	Name
Head coach	(Portugal) Jorge Mendonça
Assistant coach	(Portugal) Hugo Ferreira
Goalkeeper coach	(Portugal) João Gomes
Match analyst	(Saudi Arabia) Ghanam Al-Nasser
Team doctor	(Saudi Arabia) Khaled Al-Ahmed
Physiotherapist	(Saudi Arabia) Ibrahim Al-Hussain
Kitman	(Saudi Arabia) Abdulrahman Al-Harabi

== Coaches history ==
- (Algeria) Rabah Saâdane 1991–1992
- (Tunisia) Youssef Zouaoui
- (Bulgaria) Christov Andenov (1997–99)
- (Ukraine) Yuriy Sevastyanenko (1999–2000)
- (Romania) Dudu Georgescu (2001)
- (Bulgaria) Dobromir Zhechev (2001–02)
- (Brazil) Gildo Rodrigues (2002–03)
- (Egypt) Hamada Nasr (2011–12)
- (Tunisia) Habib Ben Romdhane (2012)
- (Tunisia) Oussama Cherif (2019–21)
- (Egypt) Hamada Nasr (2021–22)
- (Egypt) Amir Abdelaziz (2021–22)
- (Tunisia) Ameur Derbal (2022–23)
- (Romania) Florin Motroc (2023)
- (Italy) Giovanni Solinas (2023–24)
- (Portugal) Mário Silva (2024–2026)
- (Serbia) Nestor El Maestro (2026)
- (Portugal) Jorge Mendonça (2026–)

== Players ==
As of 10 September 2025:

Note: Flags indicate national team as defined under FIFA eligibility rules; some limited exceptions apply. Players may hold more than one non-FIFA nationality.

No.	Pos.	Nation	Player
3	DF	POR	Diogo Queirós
5	MF	POR	Afonso Taira
6	DF	KSA	Khaled Al-Muhawis
7	MF	POR	João Novais
8	MF	KSA	Abdulelah Al-Shammeri
9	FW	BRA	Marcos André (on loan from Valladolid)
10	MF	KSA	Faisal Al-Mutairi
11	MF	KSA	Mohammed Al-Marri
12	DF	KSA	Mohammed Al-Kunaydiri
13	DF	KSA	Khaled Al-Khathlan
15	MF	KSA	Ammar Al-Najjar
16	MF	KSA	Mohammed Sahlouli
17	MF	KSA	Ahmed Al-Badah (on loan from Al-Faisaly)
20	MF	KSA	Jathub Al-Dhafieri
21	MF	KSA	Iyad Madani
22	GK	KSA	Bader Al-Enezi

No.	Pos.	Nation	Player
30	MF	KSA	Musleh Al-Shaikh
55	MF	KSA	Abdulwahed Al-Nakhli
70	DF	KSA	Khalid Al-Shuwayyi
72	GK	KSA	Salem Gabous (on loan from Al-Ula)
73	DF	KSA	Bander Al-Mutairi
74	MF	KSA	Hisham Al-Segaih
76	GK	KSA	Bilal Al-Dawaa
77	FW	KSA	Suleiman Al-Saeed
79	FW	KSA	Yazid Al-Garzaie
88	MF	EGY	Nabil Emad
92	FW	SEN	Souleymane Cissé
94	DF	KSA	Mubarak Al-Rajeh (on loan from Al-Shabab)
98	GK	KSA	Adel Al-Enezi
—	DF	KSA	Rayan Al-Ghamdi (on loan from Al-Hilal)
—	FW	VEN	Ronald Rodríguez (on loan from Monagas)

=== Out on loan ===
Note: Flags indicate national team as defined under FIFA eligibility rules; some limited exceptions apply. Players may hold more than one non-FIFA nationality.

No. / Pos. / Nation / Player; 24 / DF / KSA / Abdullah Hawsawi (at Al-Shabab)	No. / Pos. / Nation / Player; — / FW / BRA / Lázaro (at Al-Fayha)

== See also ==
- List of football clubs in Saudi Arabia
- Unaizah
