= 2011–12 Saudi Pro League =

Saudi Pro League
- Season: 2011–2012
- Dates: 9 September 2011 – 18 April 2012
- Champions: Al-Shabab (6th title)
- Relegated: Al-Qadsiah; Al-Ansar
- AFC Champions League: Al-Shabab; Al-Ahli; Al-Hilal; Al-Ettifaq
- UAFA Club Cup: Al-Fateh; Al-Nassr
- GCC Champions League: Al-Faisaly; Najran
- Matches: 182
- Goals: 537 (2.95 per match)
- Top goalscorer: Victor Simões; Nasser Al-Shamrani (21 goals each)
- Biggest home win: Al-Ittihad 7–0 Hajer (16 December 2011)
- Biggest away win: Al-Qadsiah 0–8 Al-Ittihad (2 November 2011)
- Highest scoring: Al-Qadsiah 4–5 Al-Hilal (20 October 2011)
- Longest winning run: 9 games Al-Hilal
- Longest unbeaten run: 26 games Al-Shabab
- Longest winless run: 18 games Al-Ansar
- Longest losing run: 17 games Al-Ansar
- Highest attendance: 22,996; Al-Hilal 4–0 Al-Ahli (29 September 2011)
- Lowest attendance: 28; Al-Qadsiah 2–2 Al-Faisaly (30 November 2011)
- Average attendance: 4,374

The 2011–12 Saudi Professional League (known as the Zain Professional League for sponsorship reasons) was the 36th season of the Saudi Professional League, the top Saudi professional league for association football clubs, since its establishment in 1976. The season began on 9 September 2011, and ended on 18 April 2012. Al-Hilal were the defending champions. The league was contested by the 12 teams from the 2010–11 season as well as Al-Ansar and Hajer, who joined as the promoted clubs from the 2010–11 First Division. They replace Al-Hazem and Al-Wehda who were relegated to the 2011–12 First Division.

On 14 April, Al-Shabab won their sixth league title on the final matchday after a 1–1 draw away to runners-up Al-Ahli. Al-Shabab ended the season without a single defeat becoming the second team to ever do so in a 26-game league season and the third team overall.

Al-Ansar were the first team to be relegated following a 1–0 home defeat against Al-Raed on 31 March. Al-Qadsiah became the second and final team to be relegated following a 3–2 defeat away to Al-Nassr on 13 April.

== Teams ==
Fourteen teams competed in the league – the twelve teams from the previous season and the two teams promoted from the First Division. The promoted teams were Al-Ansar (returning after an absence of six years) and Hajer (returning after an absence of twelve years). They replaced Al-Hazem (ending their six-year top-flight spell) and Al-Wehda (ending their eight-year top-flight spell).

=== Stadiums and locations ===
Locations of teams in the 2011–12 Saudi Professional League

Note: Table lists in alphabetical order.

Team	Location	Stadium	Capacity
Al-Ahli	Jeddah	Prince Abdullah Al-Faisal Stadium	25,000
Al-Ansar	Medina	Prince Mohammed bin Abdul Aziz Stadium	24,000
Al-Ettifaq	Dammam	Prince Mohamed bin Fahd Stadium	21,701
Al-Faisaly	Harmah	Prince Salman Sport City Stadium	5,200
Al-Fateh	Al-Hasa	Prince Abdullah bin Jalawi Stadium	19,096
Al-Hilal	Riyadh	King Fahd International Stadium; Prince Faisal bin Fahd Stadium	62,685; 22,500
Al-Ittihad	Jeddah	Prince Abdullah Al-Faisal Stadium	25,000
Al-Nassr	Riyadh	King Fahd International Stadium; Prince Faisal bin Fahd Stadium	62,685; 22,500
Al-Qadsiah	Khobar	Prince Saud bin Jalawi Stadium	11,000
Al-Raed	Buraidah	King Abdullah Sport City Stadium	23,600
Al-Shabab	Riyadh	King Fahd International Stadium; Prince Faisal bin Fahd Stadium	62,685; 22,500
Al-Taawoun	Buraidah	King Abdullah Sport City Stadium	23,600
Hajer	Al-Hasa	Prince Abdullah bin Jalawi Stadium	19,096
Najran	Najran	Al Akhdoud Club Stadium	3,200

=== Personnel and kits ===
Team	Manager	Captain	Kit manufacturer	Shirt sponsor
Al-Ahli	(Czech Republic) Karel Jarolím	(Saudi Arabia) Mohammad Massad	Adidas	STC
Al-Ansar	(Tunisia) Jalel Kadri	(Saudi Arabia) Abdoh Besisi	Adidas	
Al-Ettifaq	(Croatia) Branko Ivanković	(Saudi Arabia) Sayaf Al-Bishi	Hattrick	
Al-Faisaly	(Croatia) Zlatko Dalić	(Saudi Arabia) Omar Abdulaziz	Hattrick	
Al-Fateh	(Tunisia) Fathi Al-Jabal	(Saudi Arabia) Jaber Hagawi	Lotto	Fuchsia^{1}
Al-Hilal	(Czech Republic) Ivan Hašek	(Saudi Arabia) Osama Hawsawi	Adidas	Mobily
Al-Ittihad	(Spain) Raúl Caneda	(Saudi Arabia) Mohammed Noor	Nike	STC
Al-Nassr	(Colombia) Francisco Maturana	(Saudi Arabia) Hussein Abdulghani	Nike	STC
Al-Qadsiah	(Portugal) Mariano Barreto	(Saudi Arabia) Ali Al-Shehri	Hattrick	
Al-Raed	(Tunisia) Ammar Souayah	(Saudi Arabia) Mohammed Al-Khojali	Hattrick	Al-Remeikhany
Al-Shabab	(Belgium) Michel Preud'homme	(Saudi Arabia) Ahmed Otaif	Adidas	STC
Al-Taawoun	(Egypt) Khalid Kamal (caretaker)	(Saudi Arabia) Ahmed Al-Harbi	Jako	
Hajer	(Brazil) Ednaldo Patricio	(Saudi Arabia) Khaled Al-Rejaib	Hattrick	Al-Ghadeer
Najran	(North Macedonia) Gjoko Hadžievski	(Syria) Jehad Al-Hussain	Hattrick	

- ^{1} On the back of the strip.

=== Managerial changes ===
Team	Outgoing manager	Manner of departure	Date of vacancy	Position in table	Incoming manager	Date of appointment
Al-Ansar	(Tunisia) Djamel Belkacem	End of contract	18 May 2011	Pre-season	(Bosnia and Herzegovina) Blaž Slišković	30 May 2011
Al-Nassr	(Croatia) Dragan Skočić	Sacked	26 May 2011	Pre-season	(Portugal) Eurico Gomes (caretaker)	26 May 2011
Al-Qadsiah	(Bulgaria) Dimitar Dimitrov	End of contract	1 June 2011	Pre-season	(Portugal) Mariano Barreto	12 June 2011
Hajer	(Tunisia) Zuhair Al-Louati	End of contract	1 June 2011	Pre-season	(Brazil) Ednaldo Patricio	27 June 2011
Najran	(Portugal) José Rachão	End of contract	1 June 2011	Pre-season	(North Macedonia) Gjoko Hadžievski	1 July 2011
Al-Shabab	(Argentina) Enzo Trossero	End of contract	12 June 2011	Pre-season	(Belgium) Michel Preud'homme	14 June 2011
Al-Hilal	(Argentina) Gabriel Calderón	Sacked	18 June 2011	Pre-season	(Germany) Thomas Doll	20 July 2011
Al-Ahli	(Serbia) Aleksandar Ilić	End of contract	30 June 2011	Pre-season	(Czech Republic) Karel Jarolím	5 August 2011
Al-Ettifaq	(Tunisia) Youssef Zouaoui	End of contract	30 June 2011	Pre-season	(Croatia) Branko Ivanković	22 July 2011
Al-Nassr	(Portugal) Eurico Gomes (caretaker)	End of caretaker period	30 June 2011	Pre-season	(Argentina) Gustavo Costas	18 July 2011
Al-Raed	(Portugal) Eurico Gomes	Sacked	17 October 2011	13th	(Tunisia) Hafez Al-Hoarbi (caretaker)	17 October 2011
Al-Ansar	(Bosnia and Herzegovina) Blaž Slišković	Sacked	26 October 2011	14th	(Saudi Arabia) Ayoub Ghulam (caretaker)	26 October 2011
Al-Raed	(Tunisia) Hafez Al-Hoarbi (caretaker)	End of caretaker period	28 October 2011	13th	(Tunisia) Ammar Souayah	28 October 2011
Al-Ansar	(Saudi Arabia) Ayoub Ghulam (caretaker)	End of caretaker period	10 November 2011	14th	(Tunisia) Jalel Kadri	10 November 2011
Al-Ittihad	(Belgium) Dimitri Davidović	Sacked	28 November 2011	5th	(Saudi Arabia) Abdullah Ghurab (caretaker)	28 November 2011
Al-Nassr	(Argentina) Gustavo Costas	Sacked	30 November 2011	6th	(Saudi Arabia) Ali Komaikh (caretaker)	30 November 2011
Al-Nassr	(Saudi Arabia) Ali Komaikh (caretaker)	End of caretaker period	4 December 2011	6th	(Colombia) Francisco Maturana	4 December 2011
Al-Ittihad	(Saudi Arabia) Abdullah Ghurab (caretaker)	End of caretaker period	16 December 2011	6th	(Slovenia) Matjaž Kek	16 December 2011
Al-Taawoun	(Romania) Florin Motroc	Resigned	29 December 2011	13th	(Croatia) Srećko Juričić	30 December 2011
Al-Taawoun	(Croatia) Srećko Juričić	Sacked	20 January 2012	12th	(Romania) Grigore Sichitiu	20 January 2012
Al-Hilal	(Germany) Thomas Doll	Sacked	22 January 2012	4th	(Czech Republic) Ivan Hašek	22 January 2012
Al-Ittihad	(Slovenia) Matjaž Kek	Sacked	8 February 2012	6th	(Saudi Arabia) Abdullah Ghurab (caretaker)	8 February 2012
Al-Ittihad	(Saudi Arabia) Abdullah Ghurab (caretaker)	End of caretaker period	27 February 2012	7th	(Spain) Raúl Caneda	27 February 2012
Al-Taawoun	(Romania) Grigore Sichitiu	Sacked	2 April 2012	12th	(Egypt) Khalid Kamal (caretaker)	2 April 2012

=== Foreign players ===
The number of foreign players is restricted to four per team, including a slot for a player from AFC countries.

Players name in bold indicates the player is registered during the mid-season transfer window.

Club	Player 1	Player 2	Player 3	AFC player	Former players
Al-Ahli	(Brazil) Marcelo Camacho	(Brazil) Victor Simões	(Colombia) Jairo Palomino	(Oman) Amad Al-Hosni	
Al-Ansar	(Ghana) **Sadick Adams**	(Senegal) **Diakite Lamine**	(Tunisia) **Radhouane Ben Ouanès**	(Syria) **Mohammad Istanbuli**	(Brazil) Tatá (Jordan) Mohammad Muneer (Serbia) Despot Višković (Serbia) Nenad Injac
Al-Ettifaq	(Argentina) Sebastián Tagliabúe	(Brazil) Bruno Lazaroni	(Brazil) Carlos Santos	(Oman) **Hassan Mudhafar Al-Gheilani**	(South Korea) Lee Won-young
Al-Faisaly	(Croatia) Dario Jertec	(Croatia) **Leon Benko**	(Jordan) **Amer Deeb**	(Syria) Wael Ayan	(Bosnia and Herzegovina) Asim Šehić (Croatia) Pero Pejić
Al-Fateh	(Brazil) Élton Arábia	(Democratic Republic of the Congo) Doris Fuakumputu	(Senegal) Kemekho Cissokho	(Jordan) Shadi Abu Hash'hash	
Al-Hilal	(Morocco) Adil Hermach	(Morocco) Youssef El-Arabi	(Sweden) **Christian Wilhelmsson**	(South Korea) Yoo Byung-soo	(Cameroon) Achille Emaná
Al-Ittihad	(Republic of the Congo) **Fabrice Ondama**	(Egypt) **Hosny Abd Rabo**	(Morocco) **Faouzi Abdelghani**	(Bahrain) **Abdullah Omar**	(Algeria) Abdelmalek Ziaya (Brazil) Wendel (Kuwait) Fahad Al Enezi (Portugal) Paulo Jorge
Al-Nassr	(Algeria) **Hadj Bouguèche**	(Brazil) **Vinícius Reche**	(Brazil) **Wagner Querino**	(South Korea) **Kim Byung-suk**	(Algeria) Antar Yahia (Argentina) Juan Mercier (Colombia) Juan Pablo Pino (Togo) Daré Nibombé
Al-Qadsiah	(Algeria) **Saïd Bouchouk**	(North Macedonia) **Zoran Baldovaliev**	(Nigeria) Uche Agba	(Bahrain) Abdulwahab Al-Safi	(Algeria) Hadj Bouguèche (Ghana) William Kwabena Tiero
Al-Raed	(Brazil) **Leandrinho**	(Democratic Republic of the Congo) Yves Diba Ilunga	(Morocco) Issam Erraki	(Oman) **Abdul Salam Al-Mukhaini**	(Brazil) Reinaldo
Al-Shabab	(Brazil) Fernando Menegazzo	(Brazil) Marcelo Tavares	(Brazil) **Wendel**	(Uzbekistan) Server Djeparov	(Guinea) Ibrahim Yattara
Al-Taawoun	(Albania) Migen Memelli	(Central African Republic) **Vianney Mabidé**	(Morocco) Salaheddine Aqqal	(Jordan) **Yaseen Al-Bakhit**	(North Macedonia) Šakir Redžepi (Syria) Abdelrazaq Al-Hussain
Hajer	(Brazil) **Rico**	(Cameroon) **Moustapha Moctar Belbi**	(Jordan) Hazem Jawdat	(Palestine) Abdelatif Bahdari	(Brazil) Rafael Barbosa (Nigeria) Franklin Ayodele
Najran	(Algeria) Farid Cheklam	(Algeria) **Ramzi Bourakba**	(Algeria) **Reda Benhadj Djillali**	(Syria) Jehad Al-Hussain	(North Macedonia) Zoran Baldovaliev (Serbia) Dušan Đokić

== League table ==
Pos	Team	Pld	W	D	L	GF	GA	GD	Pts	Qualification or relegation
1	Al-Shabab (C)	26	19	7	0	50	16	+34	64	Qualification for the AFC Champions League group stage (Note: Since the winners of the King Cup of Champions, Al-Ahli, qualified for the Champions League, the spot given to the King Cup of Champions winners (Champions League group stage) was passed to the fourth-placed team.)
2	Al-Ahli	26	19	5	2	60	22	+38	62	Qualification for the AFC Champions League group stage
3	Al-Hilal	26	18	6	2	58	22	+36	60	Qualification for the AFC Champions League group stage
4	Al-Ettifaq	26	13	8	5	41	26	+15	47	Qualification for the AFC Champions League group stage
5	Al-Ittihad	26	10	7	9	49	35	+14	37	
6	Al-Fateh	26	10	7	9	37	41	−4	37	Qualification for the UAFA Club Cup
7	Al-Nassr	26	10	5	11	40	37	+3	35	Qualification for the UAFA Club Cup
8	Al-Faisaly	26	7	9	10	36	41	−5	30	Qualification for the GCC Champions League
9	Najran	26	7	9	10	34	49	−15	30	Qualification for the GCC Champions League
10	Al-Raed	26	8	4	14	28	39	−11	28	
11	Hajer	26	6	7	13	23	45	−22	25	
12	Al-Taawoun	26	4	7	15	28	52	−24	19	
13	Al-Qadsiah (R)	26	4	6	16	34	52	−18	18	Relegation to the First Division
14	Al-Ansar (R)	26	3	1	22	19	60	−41	10	Relegation to the First Division

Source: SLstat
Rules for classification: 1) Points; 2) Total goal difference; 3) Total goals scored; 4) Head-to-head points; 5) Head-to-head goal difference; 6) Play-off (only for deciding champion, relegation and AFC competitions participation).
(C) Champions; (R) Relegated

== Results ==
Home \ Away	AHL	ANS	ETT	FSY	FAT	HIL	ITT	NSR	QAD	RAE	SHB	TWN	HJR	NAJ
Al-Ahli		5–1	0–0	2–0	3–3	1–0	0–1	2–0	2–1	1–0	1–1	4–2	4–3	4–0
Al-Ansar	0–1		0–2	2–1	2–1	0–2	1–3	0–2	0–3	0–1	0–2	2–1	0–2	1–2
Al-Ettifaq	0–4	1–1		1–2	1–0	2–2	1–0	2–0	3–2	1–1	0–0	5–1	0–0	3–3
Al-Faisaly	0–1	2–1	1–4		1–0	0–2	0–1	1–1	2–2	2–1	1–3	1–1	2–2	4–1
Al-Fateh	2–2	3–0	2–1	2–1		0–5	3–2	0–1	1–6	0–0	0–1	0–0	1–0	2–2
Al-Hilal	4–0	6–1	3–3	2–1	3–2		1–1	1–0	3–0	2–0	0–2	1–1	3–1	2–1
Al-Ittihad	1–3	3–2	0–1	4–2	1–2	0–2		1–1	1–0	1–1	0–2	5–3	7–0	2–2
Al-Nassr	1–3	4–1	1–3	1–1	1–2	0–3	1–3		3–2	1–0	1–2	5–0	0–0	3–2
Al-Qadsiah	0–3	2–1	0–1	2–2	1–2	4–5	0–8	2–1		0–1	1–2	1–1	1–1	0–2
Al-Raed	1–5	3–2	1–2	1–4	1–2	1–1	2–0	1–4	1–0		1–2	2–0	1–2	0–1
Al-Shabab	1–1	3–0	1–0	1–1	1–0	0–0	2–2	2–2	1–0	3–2		1–0	6–1	4–0
Al-Taawoun	0–2	2–0	1–0	1–2	3–3	0–1	2–1	1–2	2–2	0–2	1–2		2–1	1–4
Hajer	0–2	1–0	0–1	1–1	2–4	1–2	0–0	0–3	1–0	0–2	0–1	2–1		1–0
Najran	0–4	2–1	0–3	1–1	0–0	0–2	1–1	2–1	2–2	3–1	1–4	1–1	1–1	

Updated to match(es) played on 18 April 2012. Source: SLstat.com
Legend: Blue = home team win; Yellow = draw; Red = away team win.

== Season statistics ==
=== Scoring ===
==== Top scorers ====
Rank	Player	Club	Goals
1	(Brazil) Victor Simões	Al-Ahli	21
1	(Saudi Arabia) Nasser Al-Shamrani	Al-Shabab	21
3	(Oman) Amad Al-Hosni	Al-Ahli	15
3	(Saudi Arabia) Mohammad Al-Sahlawi	Al-Nassr	15
5	(Algeria) Hadj Bouguèche	Al-Qadsiah / Al-Nassr	12
5	(Morocco) Youssef El-Arabi	Al-Hilal	12
5	(Saudi Arabia) Bader Al-Kharashi	Al-Faisaly	12
8	(Saudi Arabia) Yousef Al-Salem	Al-Ettifaq	11
9	(Democratic Republic of the Congo) Doris Fuakumputu	Al-Fateh	10
10	(Argentina) Sebastián Tagliabué	Al-Ettifaq	9
10	(Brazil) Wendel	Al-Ittihad / Al-Shabab	9
10	(Saudi Arabia) Hamdan Al-Hamdan	Al-Fateh	9
10	(Saudi Arabia) Taisir Al-Jassim	Al-Ahli	9
10	(Syria) Jehad Al-Hussain	Najran	9

==== Hat-tricks ====
Player	For	Against	Result	Date	Ref
(Algeria) Hadj Bouguèche	Al-Qadsiah	Al-Fateh	6–1 (A)	14 October 2011	
(Brazil) Victor Simões	Al-Ahli	Al-Taawoun	4–2 (H)	15 October 2011	
(Morocco) Youssef El-Arabi	Al-Hilal	Al-Qadsiah	5–4 (A)	20 October 2011	
(Brazil) Wendel	Al-Ittihad	Al-Qadsiah	8–0 (A)	2 November 2011	
(Brazil) Victor Simões	Al-Ahli	Al-Ansar	5–1 (H)	29 December 2011	
(Saudi Arabia) Nasser Al-Shamrani	Al-Shabab	Al-Ansar	3–0 (H)	8 April 2012	

Notes

(H) – Home team
(A) – Away team

=== Clean sheets ===
Rank	Player	Club	Clean sheets
1	(Saudi Arabia) Waleed Abdullah	Al-Shabab	13
1	(Saudi Arabia) Yasser Al-Mosailem	Al-Ahli	13
3	(Saudi Arabia) Fayz Al-Sabiay	Al-Ettifaq	11
4	(Saudi Arabia) Khalid Sharahili	Al-Hilal	7
5	(Saudi Arabia) Hassan Al-Otaibi	Al-Hilal	6
6	(Saudi Arabia) Mohammed Al-Khojali	Al-Raed	5
6	(Saudi Arabia) Mohammad Sharifi	Al-Fateh	5
8	(Saudi Arabia) Abdullah Al-Enezi	Al-Nassr	4
8	(Saudi Arabia) Ali Al-Mazyadi	Al-Ittihad	4
8	(Saudi Arabia) Mustafa Malayekah	Hajer	4

=== Discipline ===
==== Player ====
- Most yellow cards: 10
  - (Saudi Arabia) Mishaal Al-Saeed (Al-Ittihad)
- Most red cards: 2
  - (Saudi Arabia) Bandar Musaad (Najran)
  - (Saudi Arabia) Abdoh Hakami (Al-Raed)

==== Club ====
- Most yellow cards: 69
  - Al-Ittihad
- Most red cards: 6
  - Al-Ahli

== Attendances ==
=== By team ===
Pos	Team	Total	High	Low	Average	Change
1	Al-Ahli	143,486	17,200	4,110	11,037	+46.7%
2	Al-Hilal	97,112	22,996	352	7,470	−14.5%
3	Al-Raed	92,903	22,523	1,831	7,146	+4.0%
4	Al-Ittihad	91,318	16,195	2,620	7,024	−6.9%
5	Al-Taawoun	90,672	19,658	2,058	6,975	+4.2%
6	Al-Ansar	56,669	18,400	33	4,359	n/a †
7	Al-Nassr	53,748	17,945	588	4,134	−35.1%
8	Al-Ettifaq	52,653	18,016	203	4,050	−7.8%
9	Al-Shabab	35,248	8,123	725	2,711	+56.8%
10	Al-Qadsiah	19,026	6,711	28	1,464	−28.2%
11	Al-Fateh	18,584	4,672	164	1,430	−31.5%
12	Hajer	17,921	4,225	247	1,379	n/a †
13	Al-Faisaly	15,657	3,223	395	1,204	−8.9%
14	Najran	11,161	2,330	271	859	−17.7%
	League total	796,158	22,996	28	4,374	+4.0%

Updated to games played on 18 April 2012
Notes:
^{†} Teams played previous season in First Division.

== Awards ==
=== Arriyadiyah Awards for Sports Excellence ===
After a partnership of five years, it was announced that Mobily would no longer sponsor the award. The Arriyadiyah Awards for Sports Excellence were awarded for the sixth time since its inception in 2007. The awards were sponsored by Saudi newspaper Arriyadiyah and Saudi marketing company RPM. The awards were presented on 16 December 2012.

Award	Winner	Club
Player of the Season	(gold) (Saudi Arabia) Taisir Al-Jassim; (silver) (Saudi Arabia) Nasser Al-Shamrani; (bronze) (Oman) Amad Al-Hosni	Al-Ahli; Al-Shabab; Al-Ahli
Young Player of the Season	(gold) (Saudi Arabia) Yasser Al-Fahmi; (silver) (Saudi Arabia) Abdulellah Al-Nassar; (bronze) (Saudi Arabia) Ayman Fadel	Al-Ahli; Al-Nassr; Al-Ittihad
Golden Boot	(Brazil) Victor Simões (Saudi Arabia) Nasser Al-Shamrani	Al-Ahli; Al-Shabab

=== Al-Riyadiya Awards ===
The Al-Riyadiya Awards were awarded for the third time since its inception in 2010. The awards were presented on 13 May 2012.

- Best Goalkeeper: (Saudi Arabia) Waleed Abdullah (Al-Shabab)
- Best defender: (Saudi Arabia) Osama Al-Muwallad (Al-Ittihad)
- Best Midfielder: (Saudi Arabia) Taisir Al-Jassim (Al-Ahli)
- Best attacker: (Saudi Arabia) Nasser Al-Shamrani (Al-Shabab)
- Player of the Year: (Saudi Arabia) Nasser Al-Shamrani (Al-Shabab)
- Young Player of the Year: (Saudi Arabia) Salem Al-Dawsari (Al-Hilal)
