= Nechí River =

Coordinates: 7.4125°N 74.9263°W

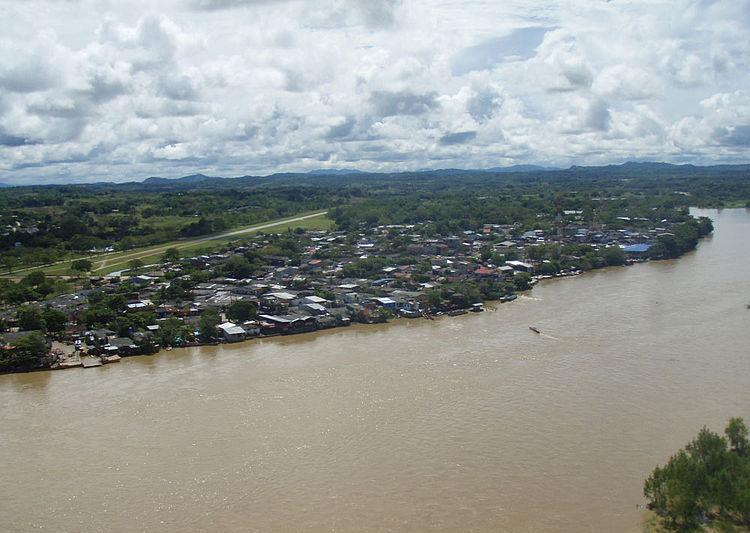

Location
- Country: Colombia

Nechí River is a river of northwestern Colombia. It flows into the Cauca River. Nechí River rises in the municipality of Yarumal, and serves as a boundary between the municipalities of Antioquia, Campamento, Angostura, Anorí, Yarumal, Valdivia, Tarazá, Cáceres, Zaragoza, El Bagre, Caucasia and Nechí. Significant gold deposits have been found in the area.

== Etymology ==
Nechí in the Yamesí language takes its name from Ne which means "gold", and Chi which means "river". This is because there are significant mineral reserves in the area, including gold.

== Geography ==
The river is about 7 degrees north of the equator. The Porce River, is a south tributary of the Nechi. Angostura is a municipality situated where the Nechi river breaks through the Andes. The weather is torrid and the humidity very high, even in the dry season when the temperature ranges between 24 and 35 °C (75 and 95 °F).

Mining properties of the area lie in an oval basin surrounded by crystalline rocks. This basin has been cut through by the Nechi river, which separates the properties. Within this basin are flat tables of gravel deposits whose edges form terraces. The bedrock of each of these gravel benches is clay, either red or blue according to exposure, in which are included beds of peat or brown coal. Each of these gravel benches is a re-concentration of the bench above it, and represents a former stationary level of the river. California Hill is a remnant of the upper bench. Below this was a lower bench whose bedrock stood above water-level. These two benches have been nearly removed by erosion and ancient workings. The third bench, partly submerged, forms the greater portion of the higher dredging ground. The fourth bench is being dredged now and is nearly submerged. The outer and higher bench gravel is on the clay which lies directly upon the rim rock, but toward the centre of the basin, where there are lower layers of gravel, is assumed to be bedrock. The gold here is of fairly uniform sized thin flakes. There is very little black sand.

== Mining ==
Dredging began on the Nechí sometime before 1900. Several companies originally operated dredges on the Nechi, but these were gradually taken over by Pato Consolidated Gold Dredging, Ltd., a Canadian company, which was one of the largest placer mining concerns in the world at the time. By 1964, 67 percent of Pato's stock was owned by the International Mining Corp with seven Pato dredges operating on the Nechí downstream from Zaragoza.

The Mapuri tract on the Nechi River, a few miles below Zaragoza, was exploited by the Colombia Gold Mines Corporation. One publication in 1909 reported, "The district of Zaragosa, on the Nechi River, paid to the Spanish Crown the sum of $1200000 in gold, this district having produced in nineteen years of Spanish occupation the sum of $6000000 in gold." Platinum was saved by dredges on Nechi River in 1922. In November 1986, a terrorist group bombed a dredge in the river, forcing the temporary cessation to gold production in the area.

== Transportation ==
Navigation of the river is extremely hazardous. Steamers have been known to become wedged against a rock ledge by rough currents when the river is flooded.

== Archaeology ==
The Field Museum of Natural History in Chicago was the recipient of a rare collection of gold ornaments, excavated from the basin of the Nechi River in 1918. The donor was the Wrigley Company. Miners who excavated the treasure turned it over to an agent of the company in Colombia. Wrigley, a member of the Board of Trustees, turned it over to the museum. The collection consists of breast-plates, aprons, elaborate earrings, bells and necklaces, all in pure gold, forming the most valuable collection in the world of art of Colombia's ancient dwellers. In 1996, 29 archaeological sites, including Brisas Palagua, La Suiza, La Primavera, San Juan Bedout, Barcelona, El Amparo, Cano Regla, Palestina, Montenegro, and Tucuman, were found between the Nechí and Magdalena Rivers. Plano-convex scrapers and a projectile point were excavated.

== Culture ==
The local population are chiefly Black and Mulatto. Due to a process of population sifting into darker and lighter groups, the lowland mining areas around the Nechí River demonstrate a significantly blacker population than the highland areas. Most of the population is very poor. Their diet consists chiefly of river fish, rice, beans, plantains, meat and a great abundance of panela.

== See also ==
- List of rivers of Colombia
