= Paramillo Massif =

Mountain range

- Location within Colombia

Highest point
- Peak: Cerro Paramillo
- Elevation: 3,730 m (12,240 ft)
- Coordinates: 07°06′09″N 75°58′09″W

Geography
- Country: Colombia
- Region(s): Antioquia, Córdoba
- Parent range: Cordillera Occidental (West Andes)

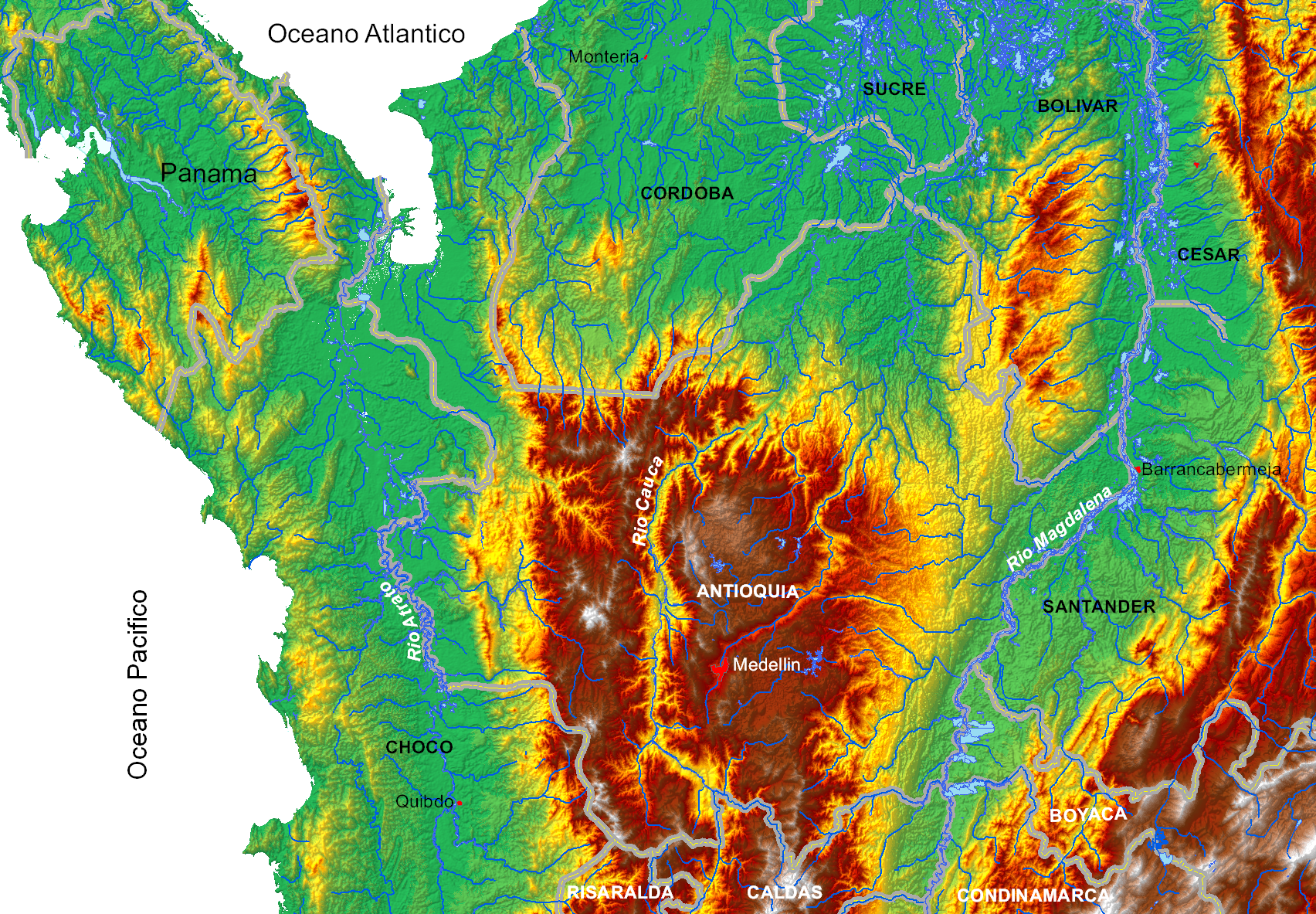
Department of Antioquia, Physical Map, Colombia

The Paramillo Massif (Nudo de Paramillo) is a mountain range of the Tropical Andes System, located at the northern end of the Cordillera Occidental (West Andes) range in Colombia.

== Geography ==
Administratively, the Paramillo Massif is located in the municipalities of Ituango and Peque in Antioquia Department; and Puerto Libertador and Tierralta in Córdoba Department.

The municipalities that surround this massif are Chigorodó, Mutatá, Tarazá, Cáceres and Caucasia in Antioquia.

This massif is intervisible with several peaks in the Sierra Nevada, e.g. Pico Simón Bolívar 5,700 m (18,700 ft) in the north of Colombia. This implies a theoretical direct line of sight of just over 500 km (310 mi), reported to be the longest between any two points on the surface of the Earth.

=== Subranges ===
This mountainous region gives rise to three smaller ranges that spread northward and recede into the Caribbean plain.

- The Abibe Mountains (Serranía de Abibe) form a natural border between the Antioquia Department and Córdoba Department.
- The San Jerónimo Mountains (Serranía de San Jerónimo) separates the watersheds of the San Jorge River and Sinú River.
- The Ayapel Mountains (Serranía de Ayapel) divides the watersheds of the San Jorge and Cauca Rivers, as well as forming a natural border between Antioquia and Córdoba Departments.

=== Paramillo Natural National Park ===
Most of the area is within the Paramillo Natural National Park, which extends from the massif into the lowlands of the Caribbean Plain. The ecosystems found within the massif are characteristic of the Tropical Andes which include páramo and mountain forests.

It is one of two regions where the bird Paramillo tapaculo (Scytalopus canus), an endangered species, is found.

One of the massif's highland mammal species is the vulnerable Spectacled bear (Tremarctos ornatus).
