= Taraza =

Taraza may refer to:

- Tarazá - a municipality in Antioquia Department, Colombia.
  - Tarazá River a river in Antioquia, Colombia
- Taraza (Dune) - a fictional character in the Dune series of novels by Frank Herbert.
