= 2012 King Cup of Champions =

Tournament details
- Country: Saudi Arabia
- Dates: 22 April – 18 May 2012
- Teams: 8

Final positions
- Champions: Al-Ahli
- Runners-up: Al-Nassr

Tournament statistics
- Matches played: 14
- Goals scored: 45 (3.21 per match)
- Top goal scorer: Élton (5 goals)

The 2012 King Cup of Champions, or The Custodian of the Two Holy Mosques Cup, was the 37th season of King Cup of Champions since its establishment in 1957, and the 5th under the current edition. Al-Ahli were the defending champions.

Al-Ahli won the title for the second time in a row and their twelfth title overall after beating Al-Nassr 4–1 in the final.

== Participating teams ==
Team	Qualifying method	App*	Last App
Al-Shabab	2011–12 Professional League champions	5	2011
Al-Ahli	2011–12 Professional League runners-up	5	2011
Al-Hilal	2011–12 Professional League 3rd place	5	2011
Al-Ettifaq	2011–12 Professional League 4th place	4	2011
Al-Fateh	2011–12 Professional League 5th place	2	2010
Al-Ittihad	2011–12 Professional League 6th place	5	2011
Al-Nassr	2011–12 Professional League 7th place	5	2011
Al-Faisaly	2011–12 Professional League 8th place	2	2011

* Number of appearance in King Cup of Champions since the 2008 season .

== Fixtures and results ==
=== Bracket ===
Quarter-finals
6	Al-Ittihad	2	1	3
3	Al-Hilal (a)	2	1	3
2	Al-Ahli	5	3	8
8	Al-Faisaly	1	0	1
1	Al-Shabab	1	1	2
7	Al-Nassr	2	2	4
4	Al-Ettifaq	1	2	3
5	Al-Fateh	2	3	5

Semi-finals
3	Al-Hilal	0	2	2
2	Al-Ahli	1	2	3
7	Al-Nassr	2	0	2
5	Al-Fateh	0	1	1

Final
2	Al-Ahli	4
7	Al-Nassr	1
Third place
3	Al-Hilal	0
5	Al-Fateh	3

=== Quarter-finals ===
Quarter-finals were played on 22, 23, 26, 27, 28, 29 April & 1 May 2012.

==== First leg ====
22 April 2012	Al-Ittihad	2–2	Al-Hilal	Jeddah
17:50 GMT	Abd Rabo 25', 56'		7' Al-Fraidi; 83' Al-Dawsari	Stadium: Prince Abdullah Al-Faisal Stadium

23 April 2012	Al-Ahli	5–1	Al-Faisaly	Jeddah
17:50 GMT	Swaid 16' (o.g.); Al-Eisa 20'; Jaizawi 28'; Al-Jassim 57'; Simoes 81' (pen.)		25' Benko	Stadium: Prince Abdullah Al-Faisal Stadium

23 April 2012	Al-Shabab	1–2	Al-Nassr	Riyadh
17:50 GMT	Menegazzo 18'		40' Hamood; 45' (pen.) Bouguèche	Stadium: King Fahd Stadium

28 April 2012	Al-Ettifaq	1–2	Al-Fateh	Dammam
17:50 GMT	Al-Hamad 14'		45', 55' Élton	Stadium: Prince Mohamed bin Fahd Stadium

==== Second leg ====
26 April 2012	Al-Hilal	1–1	Al-Ittihad	Riyadh
17:50 GMT	Hermach 83'		47' (pen.) Hazazi	Stadium: King Fahd Stadium

27 April 2012	Al-Faisaly	0–3	Al-Ahli	Al-Majma'ah
17:50 GMT			66' Al-Fahmi; 89' (pen.) Mayof; 90+2' Al-Raheb	Stadium: Prince Salman Bin Abdulaziz Sport City Stadium

29 April 2012	Al-Nassr	2 –1	Al-Shabab	Riyadh
17:50 GMT	Al-Sahlawi 59'; Reche 74'		72' Al-Shamrani	Stadium: King Fahd Stadium

1 May 2012	Al-Fateh	3–2	Al-Ettifaq	Al-Hasa
17:50 GMT	Élton 23'; Al-Hamdan 27'; Fuakumputu 36'		19' Tagliabué; 47' Al-Shehri	Stadium: Prince Abdullah bin Jalawi Stadium

=== Semi-finals ===
Semi-finals were played on 7, 8, 11, & 14 May 2012.

==== First leg ====
7 May 2012	Al-Hilal	0–1	Al-Ahli	Riyadh
17:50 GMT			60' Al Hosni	Stadium: King Fahd Stadium

8 May 2012	Al-Nassr	2–0	Al-Fateh	Riyadh
17:50 GMT	Bouguèche 73'; Reche 84' (pen.)			Stadium: King Fahd Stadium

==== Second leg ====
11 May 2012	Al-Ahli	2–2	Al-Hilal	Jeddah
17:50 GMT	Al-Harbi 21'; Palomino 79'		23', 90+3' (pen.) Wilhelmsson	Stadium: Prince Abdullah Al-Faisal Stadium

14 May 2012	Al-Fateh	1–0	Al-Nassr	Al-Hasa
17:50 GMT	Doris 24'			Stadium: Prince Abdullah bin Jalawi Stadium

=== Third place ===
Third place game was played on 17 May 2012.

17 May 2012	Al-Hilal	0–3	Al-Fateh	Riyadh
17:50 GMT			44', 71' (pen.) Élton; 76' Al-Mogahwi	Stadium: Prince Faisal bin Fahd Stadium

=== Final ===
18 May 2012
17:50 GMT

Al-Ahli	4–1	Al-Nassr
Al-Hosni 35'; Jaizawi 46', 77'; Al-Mousa 74'	Report	82' Reche

Prince Abdullah al-Faisal Stadium, Jeddah
Referee: Luca Banti, (Italy)

==== Winner ====
King Cup of Champions
2012 Winners
Al-Ahli
12th Title

== Top scorers ==
Rank	Scorer	Club	Goals
1	(Brazil) Élton	Al-Fateh	5
2	(Saudi Arabia) Abdulrahim Jaizawi	Al-Ahli	3
2	(Brazil) Reche	Al-Nasr	3
3	(Egypt) Hosny Abd Rabo	Al-Ittihad	2
3	(Algeria) Hadj Bouguèche	Al-Nasr	2
3	(Oman) Amad Al Hosni	Al-Ahli	2
3	(Sweden) Christian Wilhelmsson	Al-Hilal	2
3	(Democratic Republic of the Congo) Doris Fuakumputu	Al-Fateh	2
