= Jairo Palomino =

Colombian footballer (born 1988)

Personal information
- Full name: Jairo Fabián Palomino Sierra
- Date of birth: August 2, 1988 (age 38)
- Place of birth: Nechí, Colombia
- Height: 1.82 m (5 ft 11 1/2 in)
- Positions: Defensive midfielder; centre back

Team information
- Current team: Unión Magdalena
- Number: 3

Senior career*
Years	Team	Apps	(Gls)
2006–2008	Envigado	39	(1)
2008–2011	Atlético Nacional	96	(13)
2011–2013	Al-Ahli	37	(2)
2013–2014	→ Atlético Nacional (loan)	10	(1)
2014	Al Ahli	2	(0)
2015	Atlético Nacional	15	(1)
2016	Once Caldas	15	(1)
2016–2017	Tucumán	9	(0)
2018	Deportivo Pereira	27	(7)
2019–2021	Envigado	40	(7)
2021–	Unión Magdalena	66	(4)

International career
2007	Colombia U-20	9	(1)
2009	Colombia	1	(0)
- * Club domestic league appearances and goals

Jairo Fabián Palomino Sierra (born August 2, 1988) is a Colombian footballer who plays as a defensive midfielder or centre back for Unión Magdalena.

== Club career ==
=== Atlético Nacional ===
==== 2011 ====
Palomino played 16 matches and scored a single goal, also Atlético Nacional won the 2011 Categoría Primera A season Torneo Apertura.

=== Al-Ahli ===
==== 2011-12 ====
Palomino moved to Al-Ahli club for 4m USD in 2011. in the 2011–12 Saudi Professional League Al-Ahli were runner-up and Palomino played 17 matches and scored a single goal. In the 2012 King Cup of Champions Palomino played semi-final against Al-Hilal and he saved many dangerous balls and he showed his abilities as a great defender when they defeated Al-Hilal and thus his team qualified to the final and won the cup. Palomino helped Al-Ahli team in the 2012 AFC Champions League and it were runner-up.

==== 2012-13 ====
In the 2012–13 Saudi Professional League Palomino played 19 matches and scored a single goal.

== International career ==
Palomino played for the Colombian U-20 national team (2007) as well as the Colombia national football team. On club level he played for Atlético Nacional in the Copa Mustang. He scored the second goal at the 2007 South American Youth Championship against Venezuela.

=== International goals ===
==== U-20 ====
#	Date	Venue	Opponent	Score	Result	Competition
1	January 14, 2007	Paraguay, Ciudad del Este	Venezuela	2-1	Won	2007 South American Youth Championship

== Club career statistics ==
Club	Season	League		Crown Prince Cup		King Cup		ACL		Other		Total	
Club	Season	Apps	Goals	Apps	Goals	Apps	Goals	Apps	Goals	Apps	Goals	Apps	Goals
Al-Ahli	2011–12	17	10	1	0	3	1	10	0	3	0	34	11
Al-Ahli	2012–13	19	1	2	0	4	0	7	1	3	0	35	2
Al-Ahli	2014–15	3	0	0	0	0	0	0	0	0	0	3	0
Al-Ahli	Total	39	2	3	0	7	1	17	1	6	0	72	13

== Honours ==
=== Club ===
With - Atlético Nacional

- Fútbol Profesional Colombiano: Apertura 2011.

With - Al-Ahli

- King Cup of Champions: 2012.
- Saudi Professional League: Runner-up;2011-12.
- AFC Champions League: Runner-up;2012.

With - Unión Madgalena

- Categoría Primera B : 2021.
