= Bajo Cauca Antioquia =

Location of the Bajo Cauca Antioquia region within the Antioquia Department.

Bajo Cauca Antioquia is a subregion in the Colombian Department of Antioquia. The region is made up by six municipalities. The region cover most of the lower valley of the Cauca River with the department of Antioquia.

== Municipalities ==
- Cáceres
- Caucasia
- El Bagre
- Nechí
- Tarazá
- Zaragoza
