= Zaragoza, Antioquia =

- Municipality and town
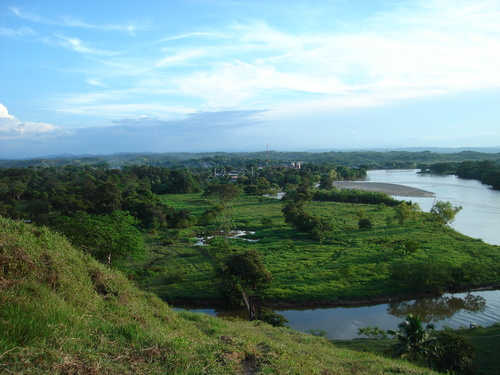

- Flag Coat of arms

- Location of the municipality and town of Zaragoza, Antioquia in the Antioquia Department of Colombia

- Location in Colombia
- Coordinates: 7°29′38.4″N 74°52′15.6″W
- Country: Colombia
- Department: Antioquia Department
- Subregion: Bajo Cauca

Population (Census 2018)
  - Total: 24,067
- Time zone: UTC-5 (Colombia Standard Time)

Zaragoza (Spanish pronunciation: [saɾaˈɣosa]) is a municipality in the Colombian department of Antioquia. Its population was 24,067 at the 2018 census.

== Climate ==
Zaragoza has a tropical rainforest climate (Af) with heavy to very heavy rainfall year-round.

Climate data for Zaragoza
Month	Jan	Feb	Mar	Apr	May	Jun	Jul	Aug	Sep	Oct	Nov	Dec	Year
Mean daily maximum °C (°F)	31.5 (88.7)	31.9 (89.4)	32.2 (90.0)	31.7 (89.1)	31.2 (88.2)	30.9 (87.6)	31.3 (88.3)	31.0 (87.8)	30.6 (87.1)	30.5 (86.9)	30.3 (86.5)	30.7 (87.3)	31.2 (88.1)
Daily mean °C (°F)	27.1 (80.8)	27.4 (81.3)	27.9 (82.2)	27.7 (81.9)	27.3 (81.1)	27.0 (80.6)	27.2 (81.0)	27.0 (80.6)	26.7 (80.1)	26.6 (79.9)	26.5 (79.7)	26.7 (80.1)	27.1 (80.8)
Mean daily minimum °C (°F)	22.8 (73.0)	23.0 (73.4)	23.7 (74.7)	23.7 (74.7)	23.4 (74.1)	23.2 (73.8)	23.1 (73.6)	23.0 (73.4)	22.8 (73.0)	22.8 (73.0)	22.8 (73.0)	22.8 (73.0)	23.1 (73.6)
Average rainfall mm (inches)	125.9 (4.96)	135.4 (5.33)	171.3 (6.74)	393.6 (15.50)	520.7 (20.50)	482.1 (18.98)	463.4 (18.24)	486.0 (19.13)	521.7 (20.54)	531.1 (20.91)	467.2 (18.39)	304.8 (12.00)	4,603.2 (181.22)
Average rainy days	7	7	8	14	18	16	16	18	18	19	17	11	169
Source: IDEAM

== Notable people ==
Jhon Duran - Footballer
