= Abdulrahim Jaizawi =

Saudi Arabian footballer

Personal information
- Full name: Abdulrahim Mostafa Mohammed Jaizawi
- Date of birth: August 31, 1989 (age 37)
- Place of birth: Jeddah, Saudi Arabia
- Height: 1.68 m (5 ft 6 in)
- Position: Winger

Youth career
- 2007–2009: Al-Ahli

Senior career*
Years	Team	Apps	(Gls)
2008–2013	Al-Ahli	73	(8)
2013–2015	Al Nassr FC	16	(1)
2015–2016	Ittihad FC	6	(0)
2016–2017	Al-Raed FC	1	(0)
2019	Jeddah	10	(1)

International career^{‡}
2008–2010	Saudi Arabia U-20	12	(3)
2011–2012	Saudi Arabia U-23	3	(1)
- * Club domestic league appearances and goals as of 1 February 2017 ‡ National team caps and goals as of 1 February 2017

Abdulrahim Mostafa Mohammed Jaizawi [عبدالرحيم مصطفى محمد جيزاوي in Arabic] (born 31 August 1989) is a retired Saudi footballer.

== Club Career ==
=== Al-Ahli ===
Abdulrahim Jaizawi began his professional career at Al-Ahli, where he rose from the youth ranks and debuted with the first team in 2008. During his time with Al-Ahli, he established himself as a quick and skillful winger and contributed to one of the club’s successful periods. He helped the team win the Gulf Club Champions Cup in 2008 and the King's Cup twice, in 2011 and 2012. His performances during the 2009–10 season earned him the club’s Player of the Year recognition, highlighting his importance in attack and his growing reputation in Saudi football.

=== Al-Nasr ===
In 2013, he transferred to Al-Nassr FC, joining a squad that achieved major domestic success. He was part of the team that won the Saudi Pro League and the Crown Prince Cup during the 2013–14 season. He also contributed to Al-Nassr winning the Saudi Pro League 2014–15 title.

=== Al-Ittihad ===
In 2015, he joined Al-Ittihad Club in search of more playing time following his stint with Al-Nassr. His period with the Jeddah club was brief, as he struggled to secure a regular place in the starting lineup and made only a limited number of appearances during the 2015–16 season.

=== Later career ===
Jaizawi continued his career with Al-Raed FC in 2016, where injuries and fitness issues limited his appearances. After a period away from top-flight football, he returned in 2019 with Jeddah Club in the lower divisions, making several appearances before stepping away from professional football.

=== retirement ===
Jaizawi quietly retired from professional football after his later spell with Jeddah Club. He is remembered most for his early success with Al-Ahli and for being part of multiple domestic and regional title-winning squads during his career.

== Honours ==
=== Club ===
- With Al-Ahli

Gulf Club Champions Cup: 2008
Kings Cup: 2011, 2012

- With Al-Nassr

Saudi Pro League: 2013–14, 2014–15
Crown Prince Cup: 2013–14

=== Individual ===
- Al-Ahli Player of the Year: 2009-10
