= Caucasia, Antioquia =

Caucasia
- Municipality and city
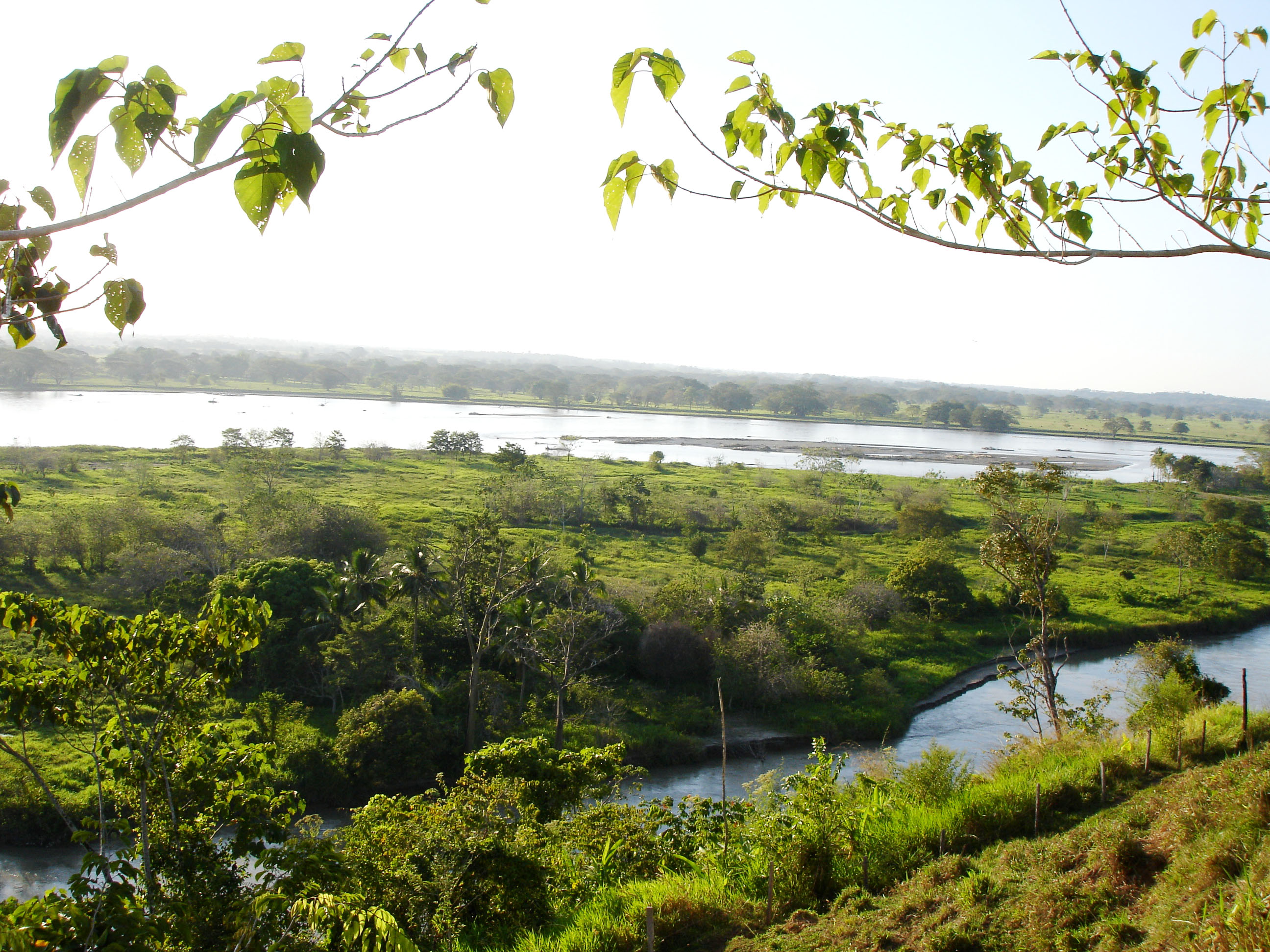
- The Río Cauca

- Flag Coat of arms

- Location of the municipality and city of Caucasia, Antioquia in the Antioquia Department of Colombia

- Location in Colombia
- Coordinates: 7°59′N 75°12′W
- Country: Colombia
- Department: Antioquia Department
- Subregion: Bajo Cauca
- Founded: 1886

Government
  - Mayor: Jhoan Oderis Montes Cortés

Area
  - Municipality and city: 1,429 km^{2} (552 sq mi)
  - Urban: 16.96 km^{2} (6.55 sq mi)
- Elevation: 150 m (490 ft)

Population (2020 est.)
  - Municipality and city: 123,304
  - Density: 86.29/km^{2} (223.5/sq mi)
  - Urban: 84,654
  - Urban density: 4,991/km^{2} (12,930/sq mi)
- Demonym: Caucasiano
- Time zone: UTC-5 (Colombia Standard Time)
- Area code: 57 + 4
- Website: www.caucasia-antioquia.gov.co/index.shtml (in Spanish)
- On the left side of the river Cauca.

Caucasia is a small city and municipality located in the subregion of Bajo Cauca Antioquia department, in Colombia. Bounded on the south by the department of Córdoba, in the east by the municipalities of Antioquia in Nechí and El Bagre, on the north by the municipality of Zaragoza, and west to the town of Cáceres, and is located 270 km from Medellín.

In sports they have the "Bajo Cauca F.C." that is playing in the Colombian Football Federation's Second Division.

== General ==
- Date Established: April 12, 1886
- Founding Date: 1945
- Founder: Clemente Viloria Arrieta
- Nickname: Capital of Bajo Cauca, Pantry Antioquia Livestock and Mining.

== Geography ==
The municipality of Caucasia is located at the northern department of Antioquia, on the border with the department of Córdoba and the subregion of Bajo Cauca Antioquia. It lies at an altitude of 150 m (490 ft) above sea level. Its territory is a flat area with small ridges in the north and west and south. It is one of the largest municipalities in the area due to its advantageous location, near the confluence of major tributaries, such as the river Cauca and the Nechí y Paramillo National Park.

The rural area is part of the Andean area where there are heights of 50 to 500 m, in a place that is a confluence of the Paisa Region and savannah regions of Colombia, giving rise to the Chilapa culture.

The highest altitude that represents the county is the mountain of Olvido (502 m) in Puerto Colombia.

== Climate ==
The municipality has two classes: warm tropical climates and warm mountainous wet climates, due to its location in the foothills of the Andes.

Caucasia's temperature is determined by thermal winds and rainfall, 27.4 °C, where is the urban area, which has a temperature ranging between 25 and 32 °C or 89.6F and 77F. The highest temperatures ranging between 30 and 32 °C, absolute maximum 35 °C. And the lower range around 23 °C, with absolute minimum of 21 °C. The beginning and end of the year are dry seasons, but beyond that the weather is changeable, wet at certain times from August to November. Average annual rainfall is moderate: 2,500 mm, and is not equal throughout the municipality. It rains farther south than the north.

Climate data for Caucasia (Cacaoterad del Diq), elevation 55 m (180 ft), (1981–2010)
Month	Jan	Feb	Mar	Apr	May	Jun	Jul	Aug	Sep	Oct	Nov	Dec	Year
Mean daily maximum °C (°F)	33.1 (91.6)	33.6 (92.5)	33.9 (93.0)	33.3 (91.9)	32.4 (90.3)	32.2 (90.0)	32.4 (90.3)	32.4 (90.3)	31.9 (89.4)	31.7 (89.1)	31.9 (89.4)	32.1 (89.8)	32.5 (90.5)
Daily mean °C (°F)	27.7 (81.9)	28.2 (82.8)	28.5 (83.3)	28.4 (83.1)	28.1 (82.6)	27.9 (82.2)	28.0 (82.4)	28.0 (82.4)	27.6 (81.7)	27.5 (81.5)	27.6 (81.7)	27.7 (81.9)	27.9 (82.2)
Mean daily minimum °C (°F)	22.9 (73.2)	23.0 (73.4)	23.4 (74.1)	23.9 (75.0)	23.8 (74.8)	23.5 (74.3)	23.0 (73.4)	23.0 (73.4)	23.0 (73.4)	23.2 (73.8)	23.4 (74.1)	23.3 (73.9)	23.3 (73.9)
Average precipitation mm (inches)	22.6 (0.89)	35.3 (1.39)	80.5 (3.17)	239.3 (9.42)	298.2 (11.74)	349.6 (13.76)	393 (15.5)	384.5 (15.14)	349.7 (13.77)	337.5 (13.29)	252.8 (9.95)	103.8 (4.09)	2,781.7 (109.52)
Average precipitation days (≥ 1.0 mm)	4	5	6	14	19	18	19	20	19	20	15	8	157
Average relative humidity (%)	79	77	77	79	82	82	82	82	83	83	83	82	81
Mean monthly sunshine hours	207.7	169.4	173.6	153.0	155.0	168.0	201.5	192.2	162.0	161.2	165.0	176.7	2,085.3
Mean daily sunshine hours	6.7	6.0	5.6	5.1	5.0	5.6	6.5	6.2	5.4	5.2	5.5	5.7	5.7
Source: Instituto de Hidrologia Meteorologia y Estudios Ambientales

== Festivals ==
- Festivities: Immaculate Conception on 8 December.
- Festivities del Bocachico, in times of subienda, January and February.
- Agricultural and Livestock Fair, bovine and equine, in December.
- Craft fair in the months of March and April.
- Virgen del Carmen, on 16 July.
- Festivities del Rio in January.
- Municipal anniversary in April.
- Return of the parties in December.

== Gastronomy ==
- Paisa cuisine
- Char-grilled meats and meat in the Zooparque Cayman alligators.
- Also involved are famous maize corn, stew, arepas, white rice with fish (bocachico).
- International cuisine due to the strong tourism.

== Sites of Interest ==
- Laguna Colombia.
- Margent swamps.
- Parque de la Madre.
- Garden HidroBotánico Jorge Ignacio Hernandez C.
- U of A University of Antioquia.
- The bridge Carlos Lleras Restrepo. It is the third bridge of Colombia in length (1064 m).
- Mirador Cerro-Needles.
- Parish Immaculate colonial architecture.
- Cathedral of The Holy Family. It has a fish-shaped shrine that represents the miraculous catch.
- Premontane forests.
- Principal Park.
- Balneario Piedras.
- Vegas Del Rio Cauca.
- Airport Juan H White.
- House of Culture Reinaldo Gonzalez Guevara.
