= David Caneda =

Spanish footballer and manager

Personal information
- Full name: David Caneda Pérez
- Date of birth: 30 January 1970 (age 56)
- Place of birth: O Grove, Spain
- Height: 1.76 m (5 ft 9 in)
- Position: Winger

Team information
- Current team: Thrissur Magic FC (head coach)

Youth career
- Pontevedra

Senior career*
Years	Team	Apps	(Gls)
1989–1990	Pontevedra B		
1990–1992	Pontevedra	58	(1)
1992–1994	Racing Ferrol	70	(14)
1994–1996	Castellón	61	(19)
1996–1997	Osasuna	16	(0)
1997–1999	Córdoba	10	(1)
1999–2000	Terrassa	32	(2)
2000–2001	Burriana	9	(0)

Managerial career
- 2006–2007: Castellón (youth)
- 2007: Castellón B
- 2013–2014: Tecos (assistant)
- 2014–2015: Maccabi Tel Aviv (assistant)
- 2015: Santos Laguna (assistant)
- 2016: Valencia (assistant)
- 2017: Las Palmas (assistant)
- 2018–2019: Pachuca (assistant)
- 2020: AEK Larnaca
- 2023–2024: Enosis Neon Paralimni
- 2025–2026: FAS (general director)
- 2025: FAS (interim)
- * Club domestic league appearances and goals

David Caneda Pérez (born 30 January 1970) is a Spanish football manager and former player. He played mainly as a right winger.

Caneda's professional inputs as a player consisted of 16 appearances in Segunda División with CA Osasuna in the 1996–97 season. After retiring he became a manager, working mainly as an assistant to Pako Ayestarán before taking his first professional job with AEK Larnaca FC in February 2020.

Caneda's older brother Raúl is also a football manager.
