= Ali Komaikh =

Saudi Arabian footballer and manager

Ali Kmeikh
Personal information
- Full name: Ali bin Kmeikh Al-Muraikhi-Al-Mutairi
- Place of birth: Riyadh, Saudi Arabia
- Position: Defender

Senior career*
Years	Team	Apps	(Gls)
?–?	Al-Nassr		

Managerial career
- ?–?: Sdoos
- 2001–2002: Al-Hazem
- 2005: Al-Fayha
- 2007–2009: Al-Shoalah
- ?–?: Al-Diriyah
- 2011: Al-Nassr
- 2013: Al-Faisaly
- 2014: Shabab Al-Ordon
- 2014: Al-Hazem
- * Club domestic league appearances and goals

Ali bin Kmeikh Al-Muraikhi-Al-Mutairi (Arabic: علي بن كميخ المريخي المطيري) commonly known as Ali Komaikh (Arabic: علي كميخ) is a Saudi Arabian former football player who was in 2014 manager of the Jordanian club Shabab Al-Ordon.

== Honours ==
=== Player ===
==== Al-Nassr ====
- Saudi Premier League (2) : 1980, 1981
- Saudi King's Cup (1): 1981

=== Manager ===
==== Al-Shoalah ====
- Saudi Second Division (1) : 2008-09
