= Raúl Caneda =

Spanish football manager (born 1969)

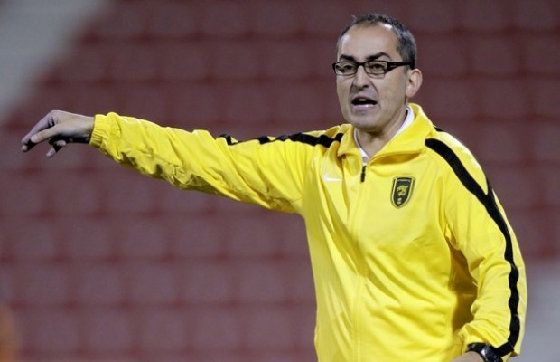
- Caneda with Al-Ittihad

Personal information
- Full name: Raúl Caneda Pérez
- Date of birth: 21 January 1969 (age 57)
- Place of birth: Pontevedra, Spain
- Height: 1.78 m (5 ft 10 in)

Team information
- Current team: Buriram United (head coach)

Managerial career
- Years: Team
- 2006–2007: Dorados de Sinaloa (assistant)
- 2007–2009: Real Sociedad (assistant)
- 2009–2012: Almería (assistant)
- 2012–2013: Al-Ittihad
- 2014–2016: Al Nassr
- 2017–2018: Al Nassr
- 2019–2020: Umm Salal
- 2020–2024: Khor Fakkan
- 2025–2026: Zhejiang
- 2026–: Buriram United

Raúl Caneda Pérez (born 21 January 1969) is a Spanish football manager. He is currently the head coach of the Thai League 1 club, Buriram United.

Caneda holds both the UEFA Pro and UEFA "A" coaching licenses and has coached a number of professional football teams across the world Including Real Sociedad and Almería. His brother David is also a football manager.

== Managerial career ==
In 2006, Caneda joined Mexican club Dorados de Sinaloa where he spent a year as a first team coach working alongside fellow Spaniard Juan Manuel Lillo.

In 2008, he moved to San Sebastian to join historic Spanish team Real Sociedad as first team coach for almost two seasons working again alongside Lillo as manager.

In late 2009, Caneda was invited to accompany Lillo yet again when he was offered the managerial role at Almería after the dismissal of Hugo Sánchez. In their first season, they managed the Andalusians to a 13th-place finish even after beginning the job one place above the relegation zone. Success did not continue however and Caneda moved on after the sacking of Lillo at the end of the 2010–11 season.

In February 2012, Saudi Arabian club Al-Ittihad announced that Caneda had joined the club on an 18-month contract The club hired Caneda based on the fact that they thought he had a similar philosophy to that of Barcelona manager Pep Guardiola, with Caneda having worked closely with him throughout his career. Guardiola wrote about him, in the preface of the book about Deportivo's former player Fran, as being: "A privileged football mind I've had the pleasure to learn from".

Caneda arrived at Al-Ittihad after four consecutive defeats. He made his debut with a brilliant 4–0 in the first game of AFC Champions League group stage against Uzbekistani team Pakhtakor on 3 March 2012. He managed to bring the team in the top of the group stage of all 32 teams with five victories and only one draw. After beating Iranian champion Persepolis in quarter-finals, Al-Ittihad met the millionaire Chinese team Guangzhou Evergrande, which had made the highest investment ever in ACL, hiring both important players such as Darío Conca and Lucas Barrios and coached by the world champions coach Marcello Lippi. Despite the amazing Chinese investment, they were able to beat them with a 4–2 victory at home. and a 2–1 in China. In semifinals, they had to fight against its local rival Al-Ahli. The first leg ended with Al-Ittihad's victory by 1–0 with a goal by Naif Hazazi. In the middle of a great financial crisis, Al-Ittihad lost their Brazilian star Diego Souza in the week before the second leg due to repeated non-payments. Al-Ittihad lost the second leg by 2-0 and Caneda lost his unbeaten record of victories for seven months in a row, from March to November, since the first match in charge of the team. Caneda became, in this way, the owner of the largest series, 25 matches, without ever losing with one single coach in the whole history of the club which give to him a big reputation among Al-Ittihad fans. After being eliminated in ACL semifinal, Al-Ittihad continued their huge financial and institutional crisis causing the break of the Spanish coach's contract on 23 February 2013 in spite of his long-term contract. The huge financial and sport crisis continued with the dismissal of historic players such as Hamad Al-Montashari, Mohammed Noor, Redha Tukar, and Mabrouk Zaid one month after Caneda's departure.

In May 2014, Caneda was announced by other Saudi giant Al Nassr as their new head coach. After 13 official games with 12 victories and only one defeat with the team in the first position in the league and above all, playing some brilliant football, Caneda finished his contract with the club due to total absence of payments since the start of the season. However, one year after, Al Nassr chairman asked him to return to replace Fabio Cannavaro due to big pressure from fans and key players. They managed to reach the King's Cup final against Al-Ahli, losing in extra time 2–1.

In January 2019, he became the head coach of Qatari side Umm Salal.

== Managerial statistics ==
As of match played 18 November 2026

Managerial record by team and tenure
| Team | Nat. | From | To | Record | | | | | Ref. |
| Team | Nat. | From | To | G | W | D | L | Win % | Ref. |
|---|---|---|---|---|---|---|---|---|---|
| Al-Ittihad | (Saudi Arabia) | 20 February 2012 | 23 February 2013 | 39 | 16 | 15 | 8 | 41.03 | |
| Al Nassr | (Saudi Arabia) | 2 May 2014 | 2 November 2014 | 11 | 9 | 1 | 1 | 81.82 | |
| Al Nassr | (Saudi Arabia) | 19 February 2016 | 30 June 2016 | 18 | 5 | 5 | 8 | 27.78 | |
| Umm Salal | (Qatar) | 3 January 2019 | 6 November 2019 | 17 | 3 | 2 | 12 | 17.65 | |
| Zhejiang FC | (China) | 29 January 2025 | 31 December 2025 | 32 | 11 | 12 | 9 | 34.38 | |
| Buriram United | (Thailand) | 31 October 2026 | Present | 3 | 1 | 1 | 1 | 33.33 | |
| Career Total | | | | 120 | 45 | 36 | 39 | 37.50 | |

== Books ==
Caneda wrote the book "La zona en el futbol" ("The Area in Football"). The book contains foreword by Caneda's former colleague Lillo, the famous Argentinian player Jorge Valdano, and Víctor Fernández. His book was published in 1999 by sports editorial group Wanceulen.

== Other works ==
Between 2002 and 2003, Caneda was the youth Clcoordinator for Real Madrid Football School in Galicia.

Other positions Caneda has held include director of the International Congress of Football in 2004 and 2005. Also in 2005, Caneda became the founder and academic coordinator of the Postgraduate Training Course in football offered by the UAB (Autonomous University of Barcelona).
