= Radhouane Ben Ouanès =

Tunisian footballer

Personal information
- Date of birth: 28 April 1980 (age 46)
- Place of birth: Sousse, Tunisia
- Height: 1.92 m (6 ft 4 in)
- Position: Forward

Youth career
- 1996-1999: ASD Djerba

Senior career*
Years	Team	Apps	(Gls)
1999-2002	ASD Djerba		
2002-2004	EGS Gafsa	4	(0)
2004–2006	US Monastir		
2005-2006	Espérance de Tunis		
2006–2007	EGS Gafsa	9	(3)
2007–2008	CS Hammam-Lif	19	(8)
2008–2009	AS Marsa	14	(2)
2009–2010	EGS Gafsa	10	(1)
2010–2011	Stade Tunisien	1	(0)
2011	Al-Ansar		
2012–2013	Stade Gabèsien		

International career
2005	Tunisia	1	(0)
- * Club domestic league appearances and goals

Radhouane Ben Ouanès (born 28 April 1980) is a Tunisian football striker. (Note: Radhouane Ben Ouanès at WorldFootball.net) (Note: Radhouane Ben Ouanès at National-Football-Teams.com)
