= Mohammed Al-Khojali =

Saudi Arabian footballer

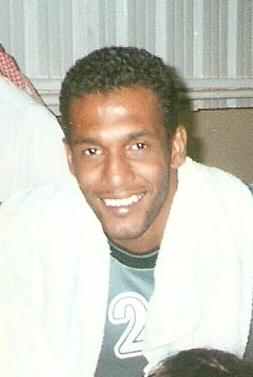

Personal information
- Full name: Mohammed Babkr Al-Khojali
- Date of birth: 15 January 1973 (age 53)
- Place of birth: Riyadh, Saudi Arabia
- Height: 1.86 m (6 ft 1 in)
- Position: Goalkeeper

Senior career*
| Years | Team | Apps | (Gls) |
| 1998–2009 | Al-Nassr | ? | (1) |
| 2008 | → Sdoos Club (loan) | | |
| 2010–2014 | Al-Raed | 21 | (0) |
| 2014–2015 | Al-Feiha FC | | |

International career
| 2001–2004 | Saudi Arabia | 13 | (0) |
- * Club domestic league appearances and goals

Mohammed Babkr Al-Khojali (Arabic: محمد الخوجلي) (born 15 January 1973) is a Saudi Arabian football goalkeeper. He played most of his career for Al-Nassr.

Al-Khojali played for the Saudi Arabia national football team and participated in the 2002 FIFA World Cup.
