= Grigore Sichitiu =

Romanian professional football manager (born 1949)

Personal information
- Date of birth: 3 January 1949 (age 77)
- Place of birth: Gorj, Romania

Managerial career
- Years: Team
- –: Partizanul Bacău
- 1989–1990: Bacău
- 1991–1992: Al-Wakrah (assistant)
- 1992–1993: Selena Bacău (assistant)
- 1998–1999: Extensiv Craiova
- 2000: Al Hilal (assistant)
- 2002: Al Shabab
- 2002–2003: Al-Nasr
- 2003–2004: Al-Jahra
- 2004–2005: Baniyas
- 2005–2006: Al-Ittihad (assistant)
- 2009–2010: Al-Nasr
- 2010: Al Taawoun
- 2011–2012: Al Taawoun
- 2014–2015: Dhofar
- 2015: Dhofar

Grigore Sichitiu (born 3 January 1949) is a Romanian professional football manager. He also held several positions as technical director or club president at various clubs such as Rapid Bucharest, Sportul Studențesc, Ceahlăul Piatra Neamț, Politehnica Iași and Fortuna Poiana Câmpina.

== Honours ==
=== Manager ===
Extensiv Craiova

- Divizia B: 1998–99

Baniyas

- UAE First Division League: 2004–05

Dhofar

- Oman Professional League Cup runner-up: 2014–15
