= Franklin Ayodele =

Nigerian footballer

Personal information
- Full name: Franklin Francis Ayodele Amankwa
- Date of birth: 24 August 1987 (age 39)
- Place of birth: Gusau, Nigeria
- Height: 1.87 m (6 ft 1 1/2 in)
- Position: Striker

Youth career
- Gabros International

Senior career*
Years	Team	Apps	(Gls)
2006–2007	Africa Sports		
2007–2008	Akwa United		
2008–2009	Loznica	17	(2)
2009–2010	Mladi Radnik	22	(3)
2011	Hajer	4	(0)
- * Club domestic league appearances and goals

Franklin Francis Ayodele Amankwa (born 24 August 1987) is a Nigerian retired professional footballer who played as a striker.

== Career ==
He played with a number of Nigerian clubs and Ivorian Africa Sports d'Abidjan, before signing, in 2008, with Serbian club FK Loznica. After only one season there, he moved to the newly promoted Serbian SuperLiga club FK Mladi Radnik where he has been a standard first team choice, scoring goals mostly with headers. After one season in Serbian SuperLiga, FK Mladi Radnik was relegated to Serbian First League, Franklin was one of the players released by the club after relegation.

In the summer of 2010 Franklin had a trial at Diósgyőri VTK.

In summer 2011 he moved to Saudi Arabia to play with the newly promoted Saudi top flight Hajer Club.
