= El Bagre =

- Municipality and town
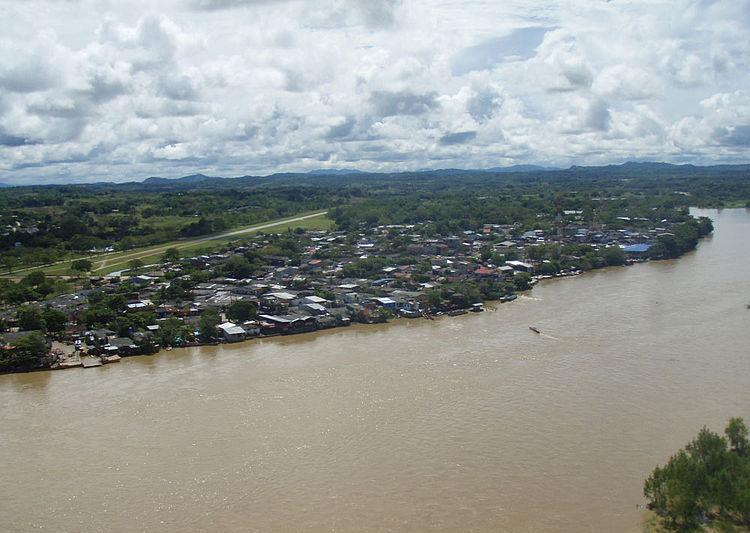

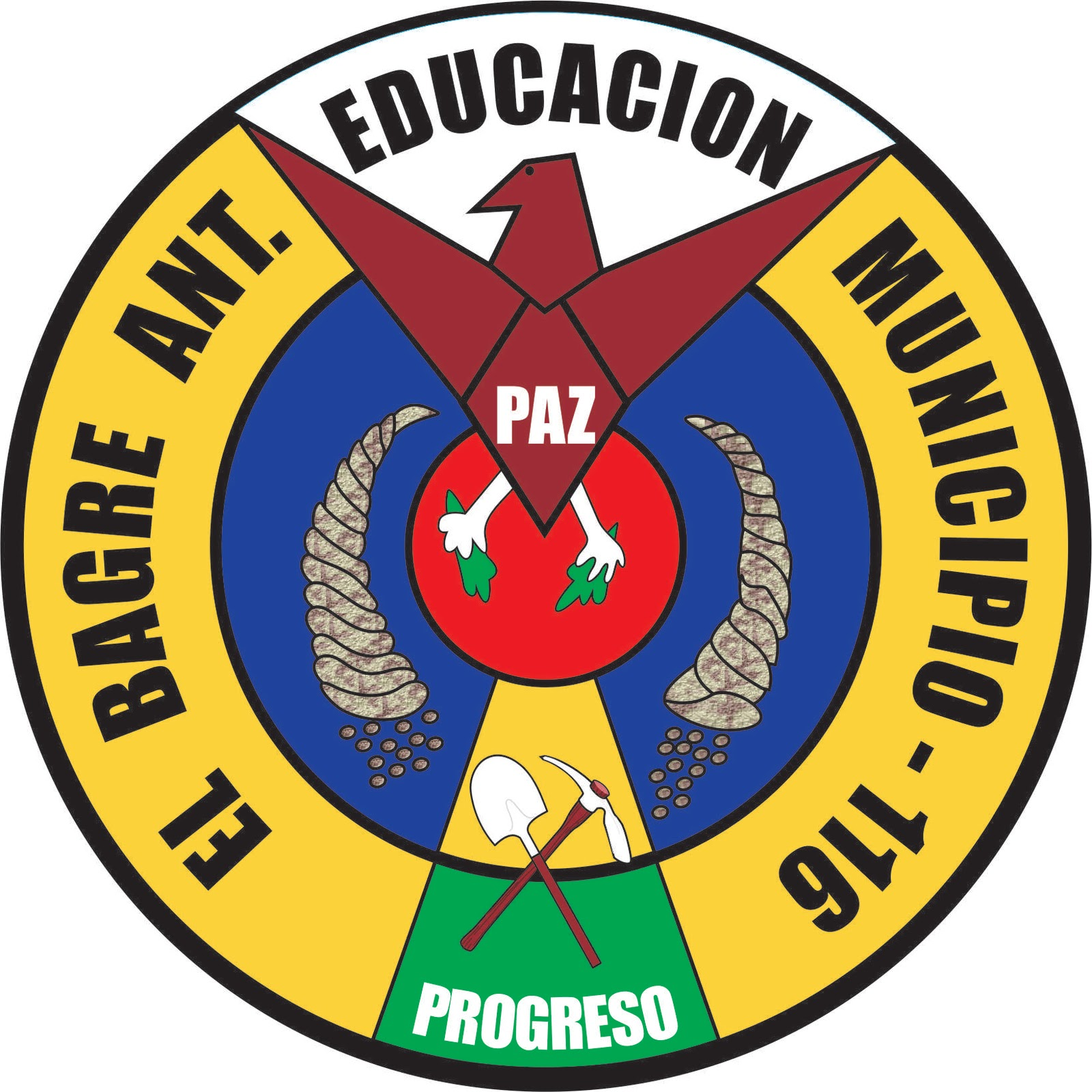
- Flag Seal

- Location of the municipality and town of El Bagre in the Antioquia Department of Colombia

- Location in Colombia
- Coordinates: 7°35′39.01″N 74°48′42.84″W
- Country: Colombia
- Department: Antioquia Department
- Subregion: Bajo Cauca

Area
  - Municipality and town: 1,560 km^{2} (600 sq mi)
  - Urban: 11.05 km^{2} (4.27 sq mi)
- Elevation: 57 m (187 ft)

Population (2020 est.)
  - Municipality and town: 53,846
  - Density: 34.5/km^{2} (89.4/sq mi)
  - Urban: 34,991
  - Urban density: 3,167/km^{2} (8,201/sq mi)
- Time zone: UTC-5 (Colombia Standard Time)

El Bagre (Spanish pronunciation: [el ˈβaɣɾe]) is a town and municipality in the Colombian department of Antioquia. It lies at an altitude of 57 m (187 ft) above sea level.
