= Tarazá =

- Municipality and town
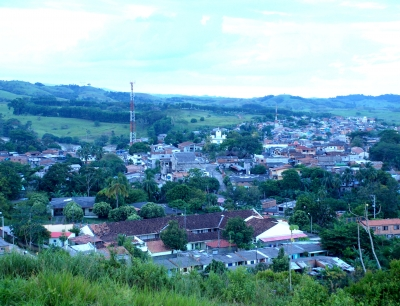

- Flag

- Location of the municipality of Taraza in Antioquia Department.

- Location in Colombia
- Coordinates: 7°35′17″N 75°24′10″W
- Country: Colombia
- Department: Antioquia Department
- Subregion: Bajo Cauca
- Founded: 1953
- Split from Cáceres: 1979

Area
  - Total: 1,569 km^{2} (606 sq mi)
- Elevation: 125 m (410 ft)

Population (2020 est.)
  - Total: 48,926
  - Density: 31.18/km^{2} (80.76/sq mi)
- Time zone: UTC-5 (Colombia Standard Time)
- Website: taraza-antioquia.gov.co

Taraza is a town and municipality in the Bajo Cauca subregion of Antioquia Department, Colombia. It lies 222 kilometres (138 mi) from the city of Medellín, the departmental capital, and has a land area of 1,569 square kilometres (606 sq mi). The municipality was separated from the municipality of Cáceres in 1979.

In April 2008, 24 people were arrested, 40 were injured and at least one was killed in farmers' protests here, instigated by FARC, against the eradication of the coca crop in the area. In the aftermath of this, the municipality declared a humanitarian crisis.

== Climate ==
Tarazá has a tropical rainforest climate (Af) with heavy to very heavy rainfall year-round.

Climate data for Tarazá
| Month | Jan | Feb | Mar | Apr | May | Jun | Jul | Aug | Sep | Oct | Nov | Dec | Year |
|---|---|---|---|---|---|---|---|---|---|---|---|---|---|
| Mean daily maximum °C (°F) | 30.6 (87.1) | 31.2 (88.2) | 31.8 (89.2) | 31.2 (88.2) | 30.6 (87.1) | 30.4 (86.7) | 30.5 (86.9) | 30.3 (86.5) | 30.0 (86.0) | 29.7 (85.5) | 29.7 (85.5) | 29.9 (85.8) | 30.5 (86.9) |
| Daily mean °C (°F) | 26.4 (79.5) | 26.8 (80.2) | 27.5 (81.5) | 27.2 (81.0) | 26.7 (80.1) | 26.5 (79.7) | 26.6 (79.9) | 26.4 (79.5) | 26.2 (79.2) | 26.0 (78.8) | 26.0 (78.8) | 26.0 (78.8) | 26.5 (79.7) |
| Mean daily minimum °C (°F) | 22.3 (72.1) | 22.4 (72.3) | 23.2 (73.8) | 23.2 (73.8) | 22.9 (73.2) | 22.6 (72.7) | 22.7 (72.9) | 22.5 (72.5) | 22.4 (72.3) | 22.4 (72.3) | 22.4 (72.3) | 22.1 (71.8) | 22.6 (72.7) |
| Average rainfall mm (inches) | 99.5 (3.92) | 87.6 (3.45) | 158.8 (6.25) | 368.4 (14.50) | 518.8 (20.43) | 470.2 (18.51) | 456.9 (17.99) | 545.0 (21.46) | 486.3 (19.15) | 503.4 (19.82) | 381.2 (15.01) | 213.7 (8.41) | 4,289.8 (168.9) |
| Average rainy days | 8 | 7 | 9 | 16 | 21 | 18 | 19 | 19 | 19 | 19 | 17 | 10 | 182 |
Source: IDEAM
