= Vinícius Reche =

Brazilian footballer (born 1984)

Personal information
- Full name: Vinícius da Cunha Reche
- Date of birth: 28 January 1984 (age 42)
- Place of birth: São Paulo, Brazil
- Height: 1.75 m (5 ft 9 in)
- Position: Midfielder

Youth career
- 2004: Palmeiras

Senior career*
Years	Team	Apps	(Gls)
2004–2007	Palmeiras	3	(0)
2006	→ Barueri (loan)		
2008	Vasco da Gama	5	(0)
2008	Ituano		
2008–2009	Angers	14	(3)
2009–2010	Mirassol	11	(0)
2010–2011	Estoril Praia	24	(1)
2011–2012	Al Nassr	6	(2)
2012–2013	Al-Wehda	10	(5)
2013–2014	Al Taawon	23	(7)
2014	Jeonbuk Hyundai Motors	2	(0)
2015	Santa Cruz	0	(0)
- * Club domestic league appearances and goals

Vinícius da Cunha Reche (born 28 January 1984), simply known as Vinícius Reche is a Brazilian former professional footballer who played as a midfielder.

== Career ==
A product of the Palmeiras youth academy, he played for the senior team twice between 2004 and 2007. After being released by the club, he joined Vasco da Gama where he made five appearances. He then had a short stint with Ituano. He then entered French football with Angers. After returning to Brazil, he joined Portuguese club Estoril Praia. Reche embraced Asian football with Saudi Arabian club Al Nassr in 2011. He won the best player of the month in December 2013.
