= Nechí =

- Municipality and town
- Flag Coat of arms

- Location of the municipality and town of Nechí in the Antioquia Department of Colombia

- Location in Colombia
- Coordinates: 8°06′N 74°47′W
- Country: Colombia
- Department: Antioquia Department
- Subregion: Bajo Cauca

Population (Census 2018)
  - Total: 24,066
- Time zone: UTC-5 (Colombia Standard Time)
- Website: www.nechi-antioquia.gov.co

Nechi is a town and municipality in the Colombian department of Antioquia. The population was 24,066 at the 2018 census.

== Climate ==
Nechí has a tropical rainforest climate (Af) with heavy to very heavy rainfall year-round.

Climate data for Nechí
Month	Jan	Feb	Mar	Apr	May	Jun	Jul	Aug	Sep	Oct	Nov	Dec	Year
Mean daily maximum °C (°F)	31.4 (88.5)	32.1 (89.8)	32.3 (90.1)	31.8 (89.2)	30.8 (87.4)	30.7 (87.3)	30.9 (87.6)	30.5 (86.9)	30.4 (86.7)	30.2 (86.4)	30.3 (86.5)	30.6 (87.1)	31.0 (87.8)
Daily mean °C (°F)	27.0 (80.6)	27.5 (81.5)	27.7 (81.9)	27.6 (81.7)	27.0 (80.6)	26.9 (80.4)	26.9 (80.4)	26.7 (80.1)	26.5 (79.7)	26.5 (79.7)	26.7 (80.1)	26.8 (80.2)	27.0 (80.6)
Mean daily minimum °C (°F)	22.7 (72.9)	23.0 (73.4)	23.2 (73.8)	23.4 (74.1)	23.2 (73.8)	23.2 (73.8)	22.9 (73.2)	23.0 (73.4)	22.7 (72.9)	22.8 (73.0)	23.1 (73.6)	23.0 (73.4)	23.0 (73.4)
Average rainfall mm (inches)	80.1 (3.15)	78.5 (3.09)	108.8 (4.28)	313.1 (12.33)	531.4 (20.92)	476.9 (18.78)	501.5 (19.74)	583.1 (22.96)	461.0 (18.15)	523.4 (20.61)	476.8 (18.77)	226.1 (8.90)	4,360.7 (171.68)
Average rainy days	3	3	4	9	14	13	14	16	14	15	14	7	126
Source: IDEAM
