= Cauca River =

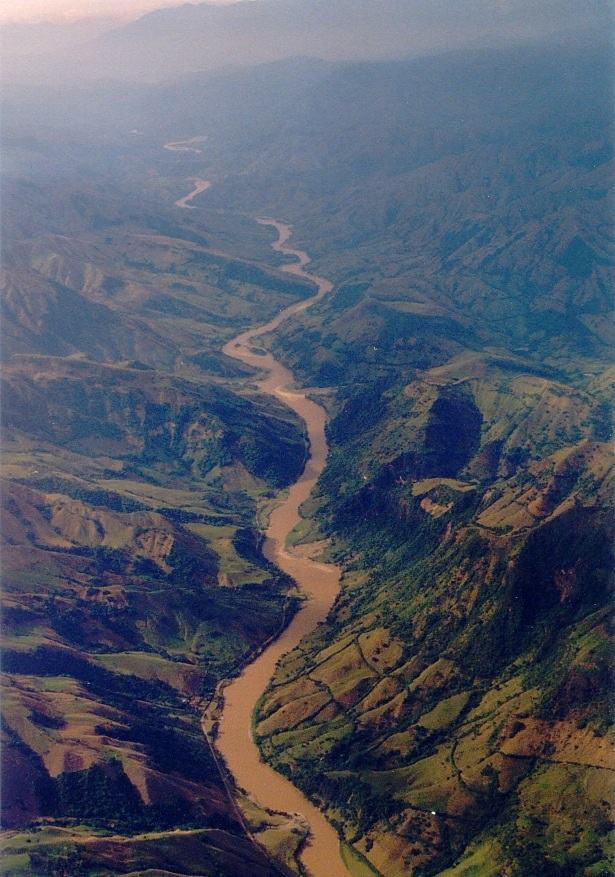
- Cauca River in Nechí, Antioquia

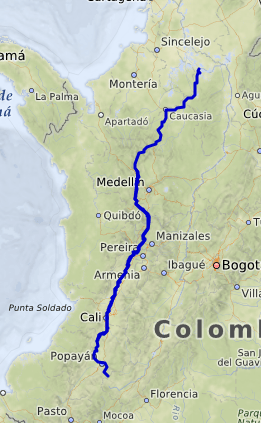

Location
- Country: Colombia

Physical characteristics
- Source
  - location: Colombian Massif
- Mouth
  - location: Magdalena River
- Length: 965 km (600 mi)

The Cauca River (Spanish: Río Cauca) is a major river in Colombia that lies between the Occidental and Central cordilleras. From its headwaters in southwestern Colombia near the city of Popayán, it flows 965 km (600 mi) until it joins the Magdalena River near Magangué in Bolívar Department, and the combined river flows into the Caribbean Sea with a total length of 1,350 km (840 mi). The river is under the supervision of the Cauca Regional Corporation and the Cauca Valley Regional Autonomous Corporation, and is navigable for 640 km (400 mi) above its junction with the Magdalena.

Cauca River

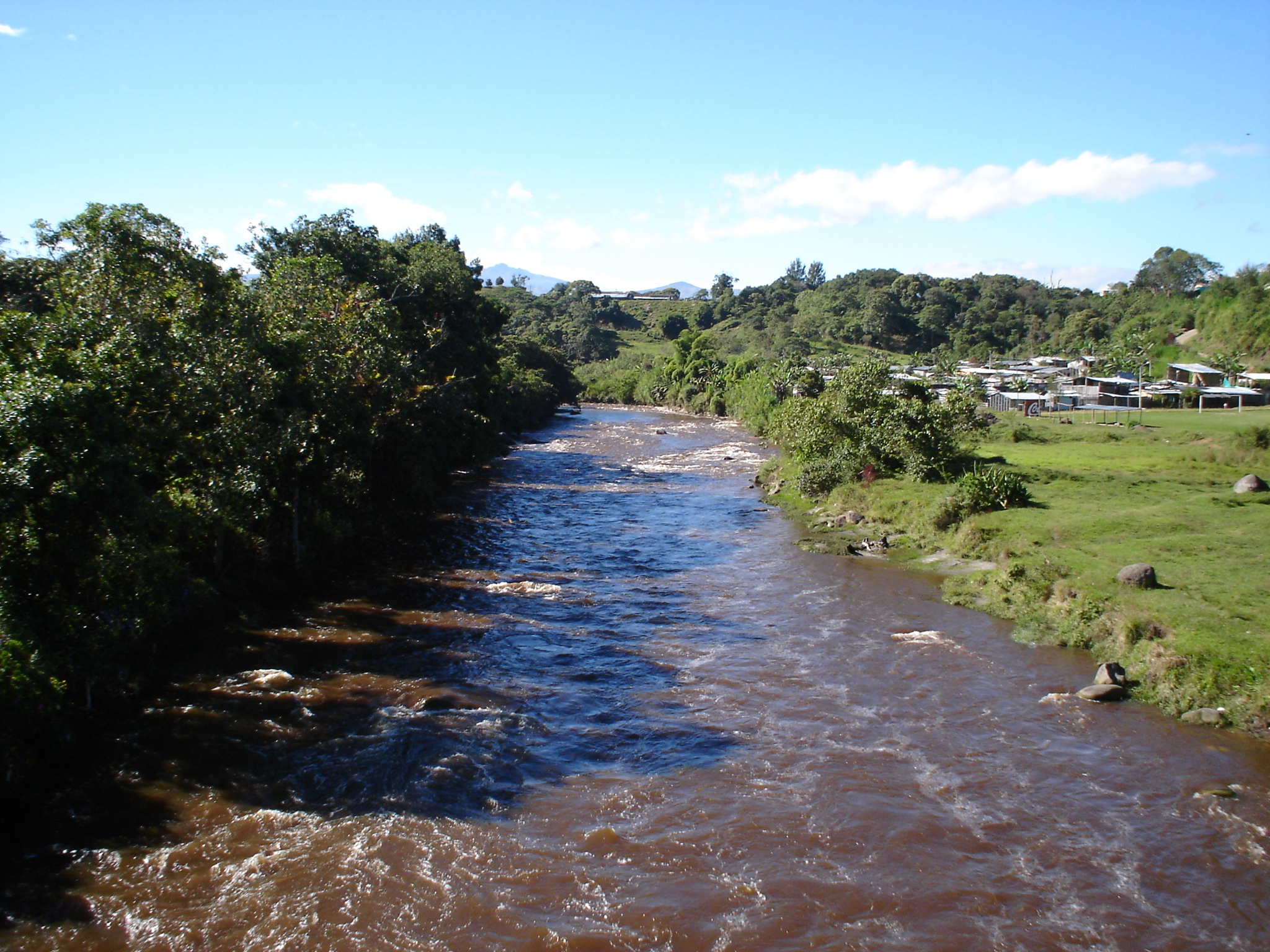

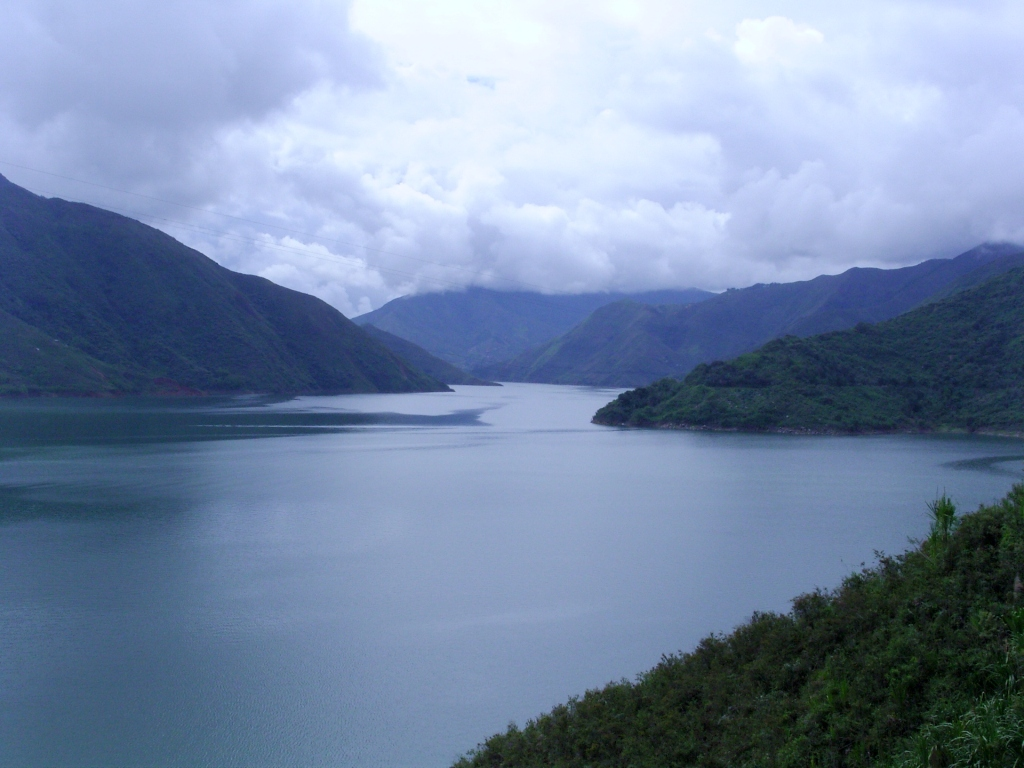

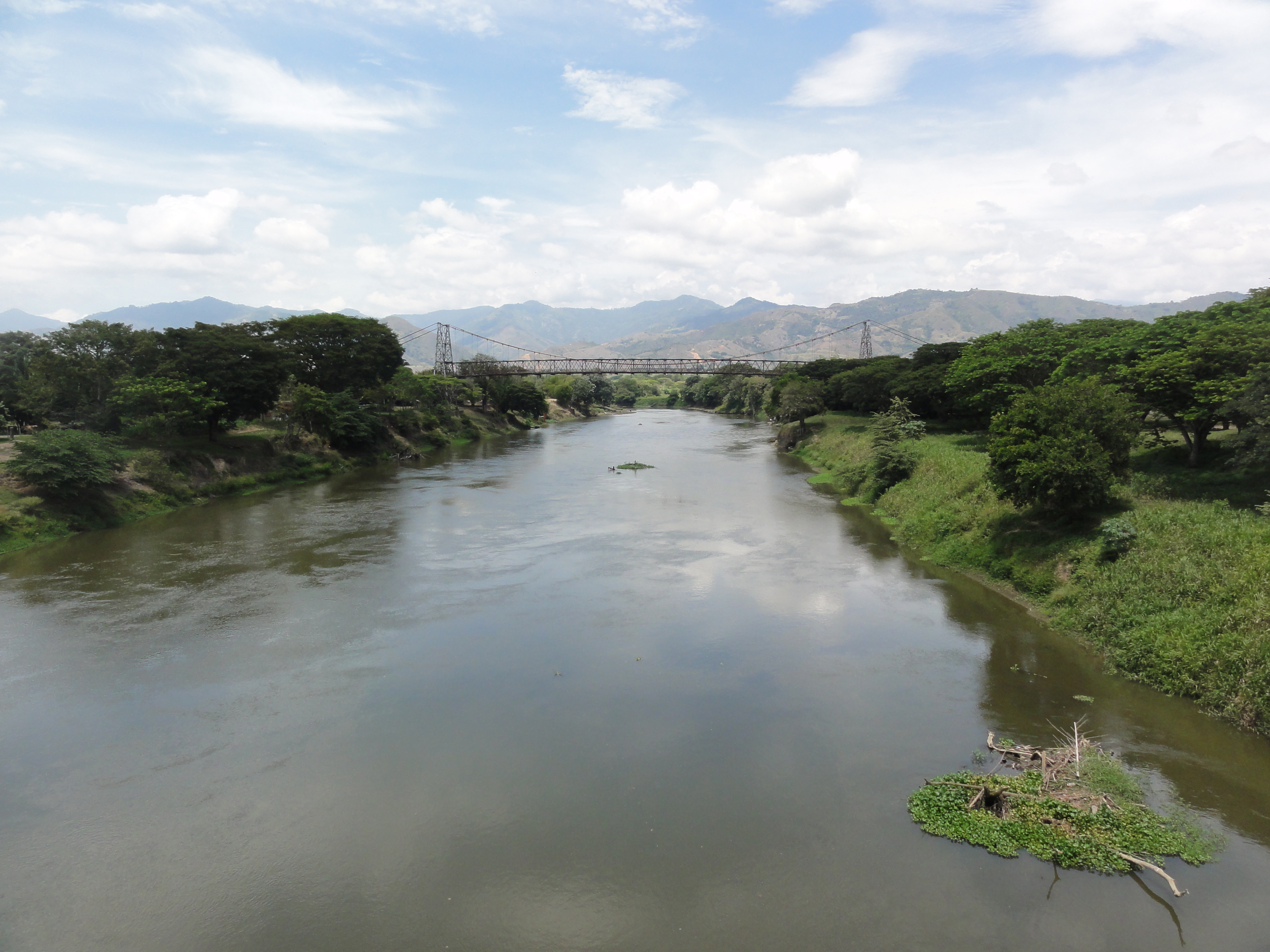

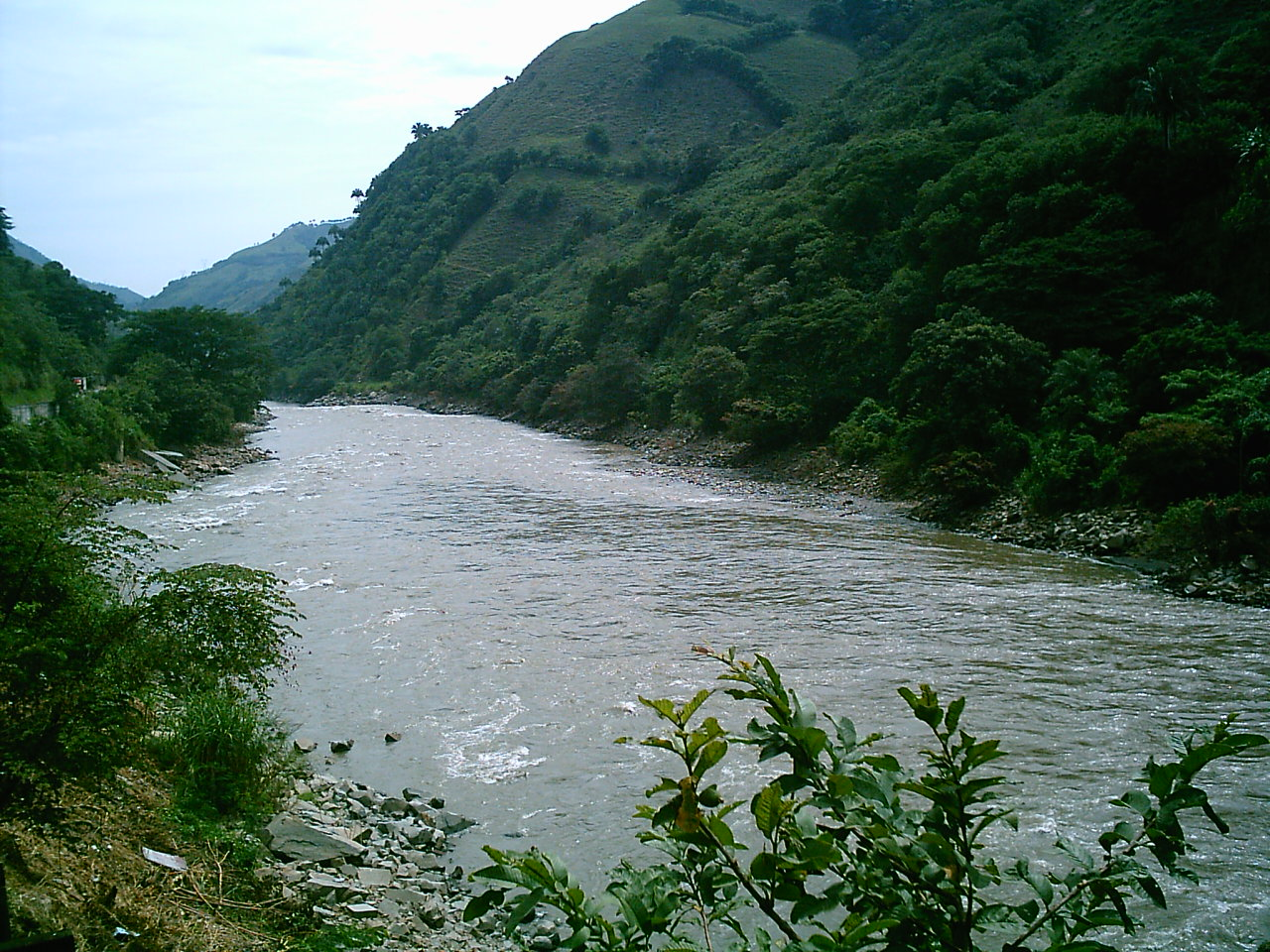

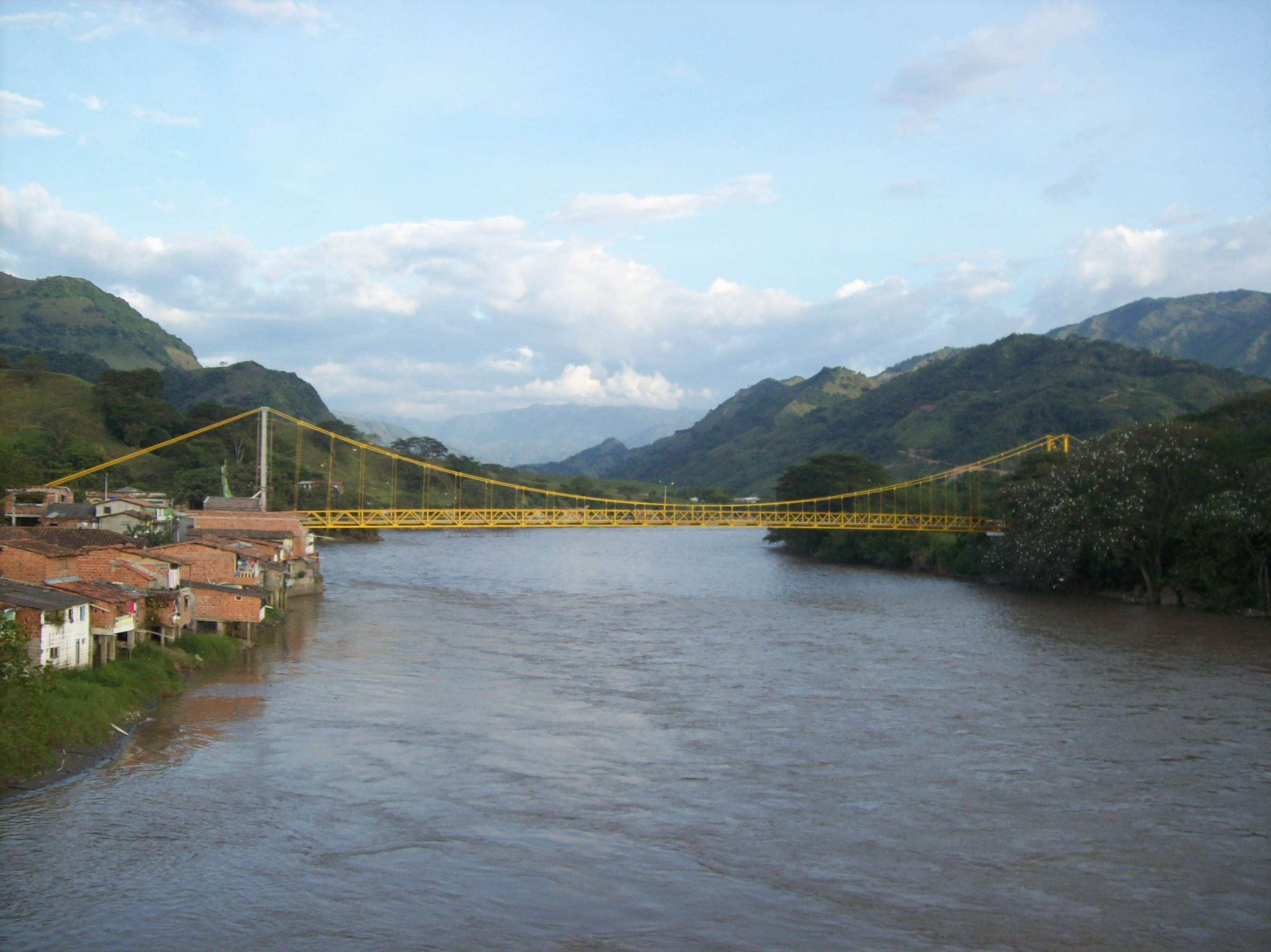

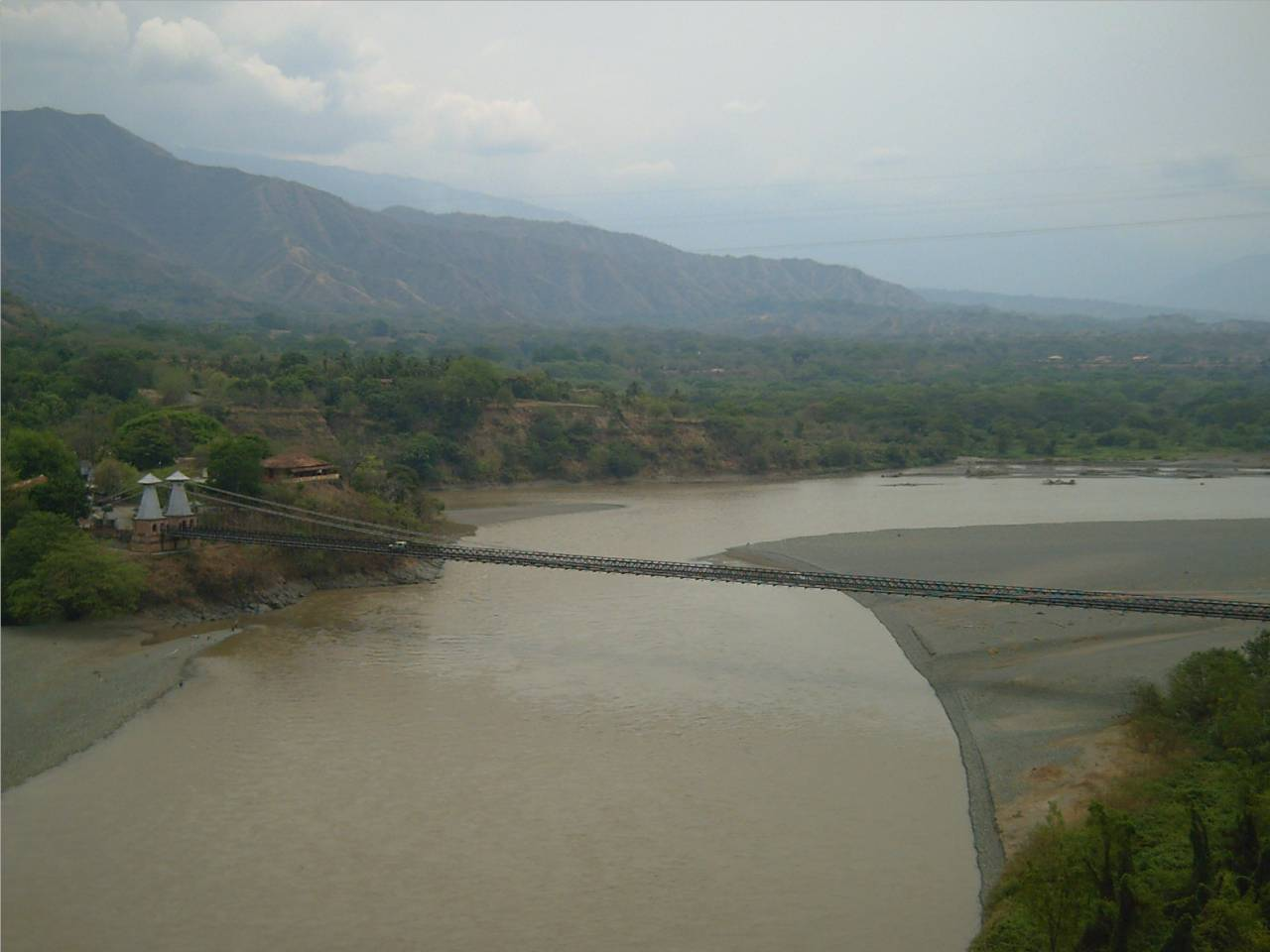

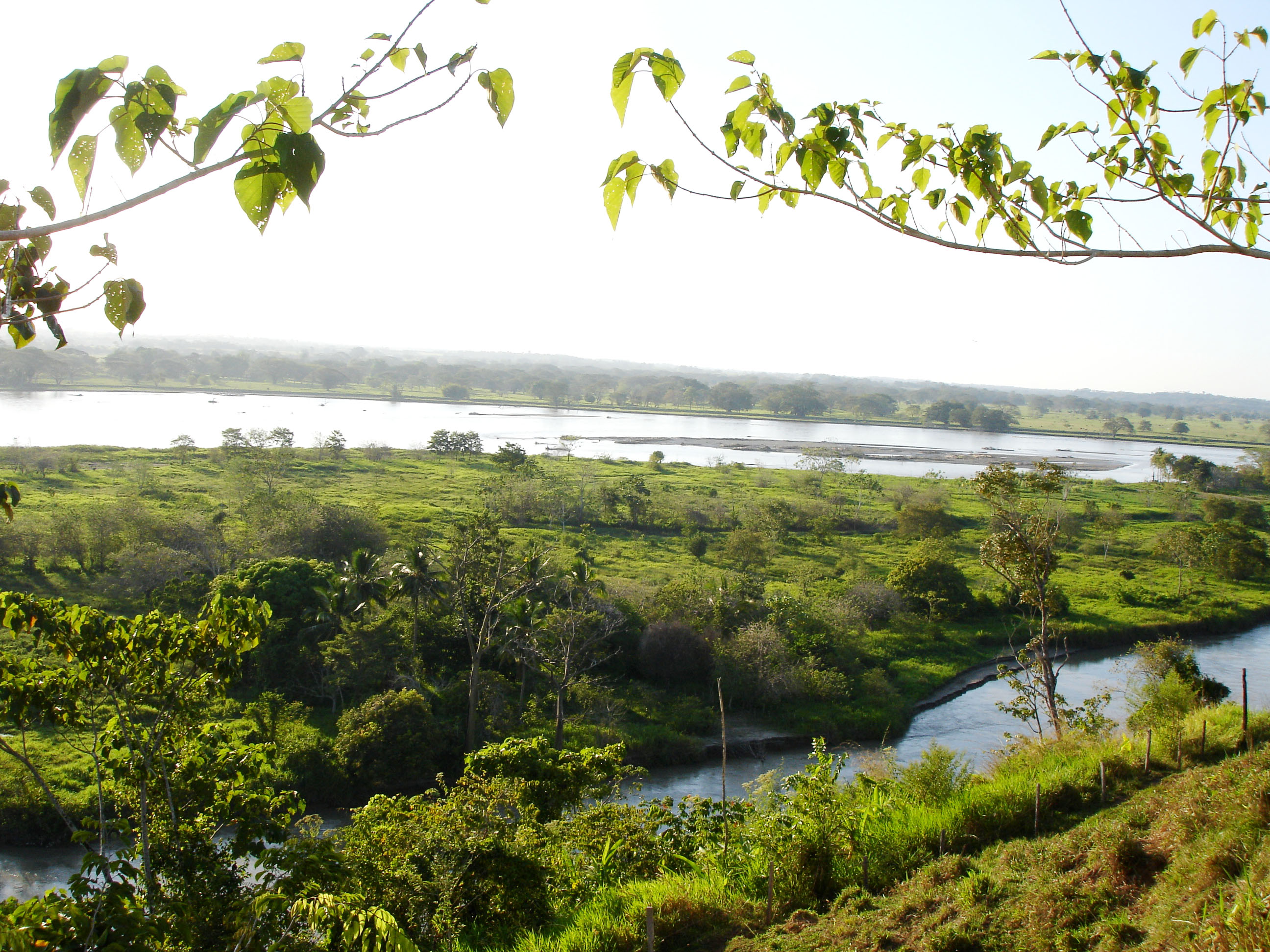

== Environmental issues ==
On November 18, 2007, Colombian newspaper El Tiempo reported that the river was receiving an average of 500 tons of residual waste a day. Pollution from the city of Popayán, seven gold mines that also add industrial pollutants such as mercury, some 8 sand mills, plus a couple of mines of coal and bauxite. Cali, the largest city on the river, depends on the river for 76 percent of its water supply. Adding to this, other affluent rivers collect residual waters from other major cities and deposit an approximate 330 tons of residual waste into the river. By the time it gets to Yumbo, the river has no oxygen.

The Hidroituango energy dam project has seriously affected the Cauca River. The dam has decreased its flow, in some parts by up to 80%.

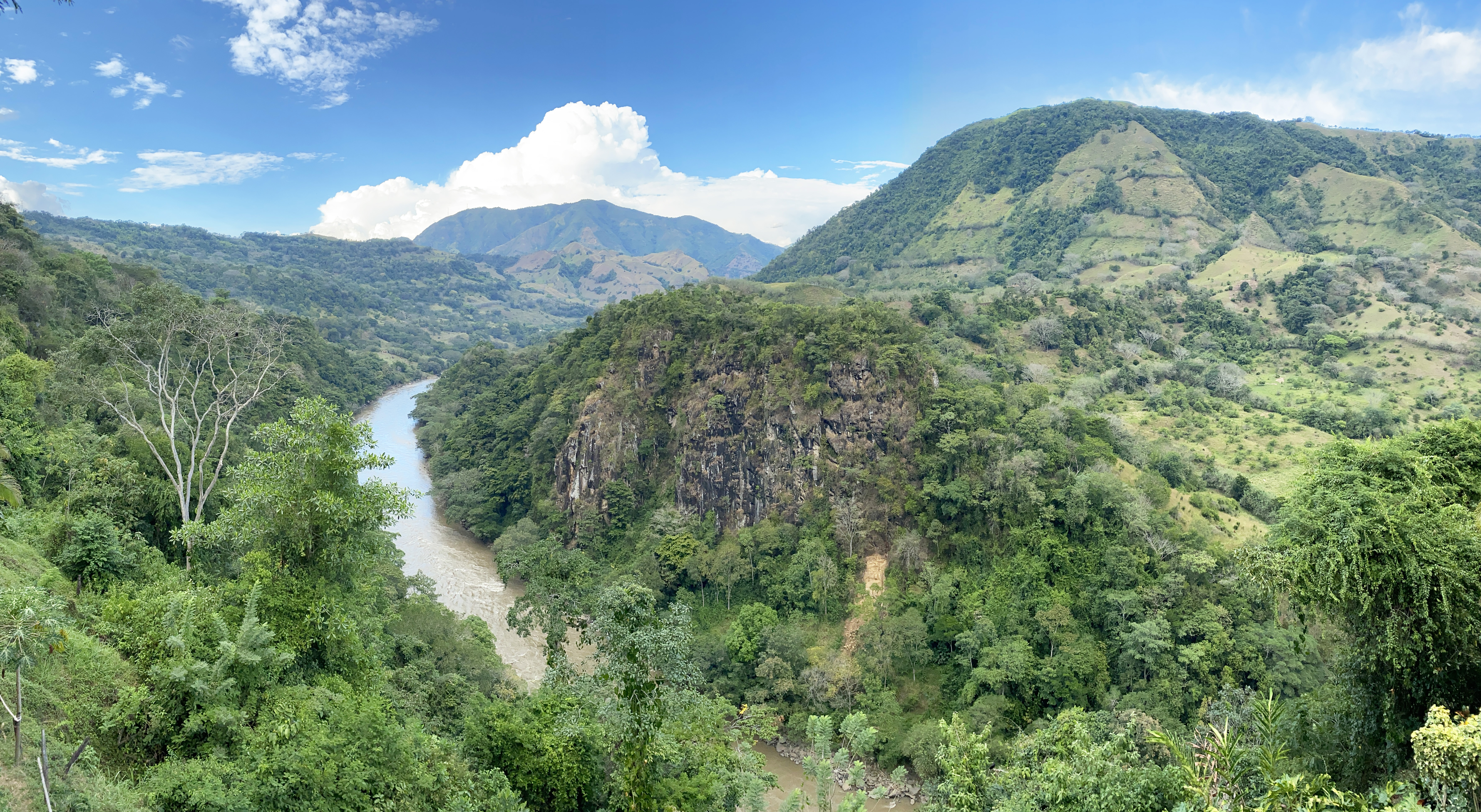
Cauca River in Caldas Department
