= Cáceres, Antioquia =

- Municipality and town
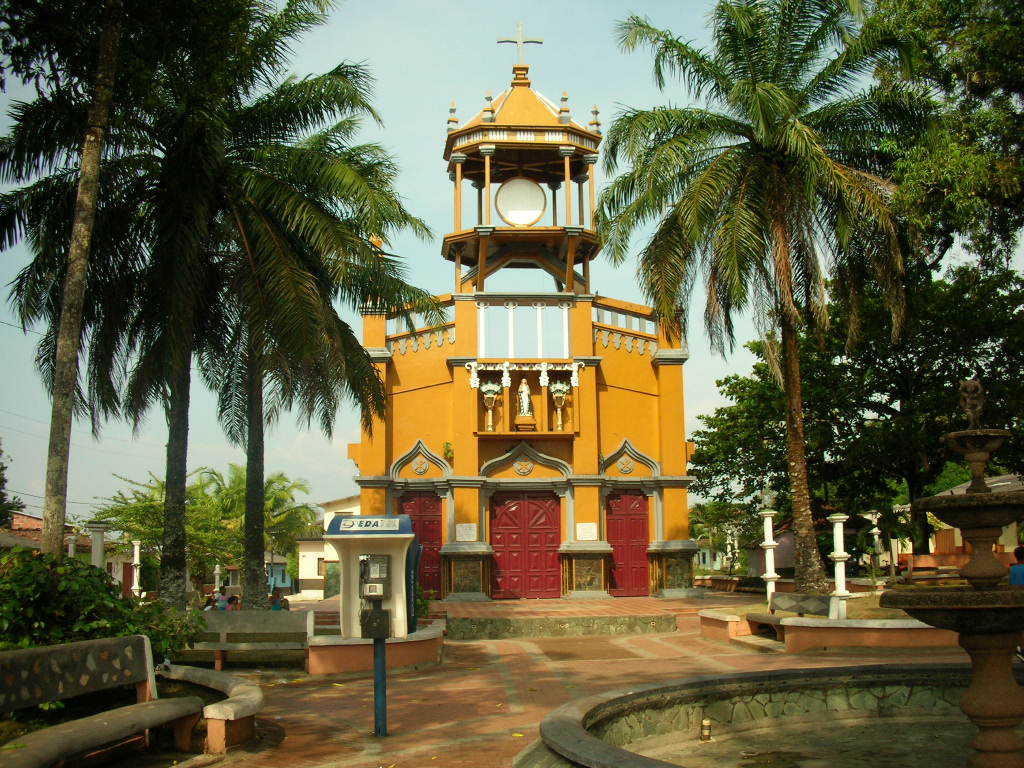

- Flag Coat of arms

- Location of the municipality and town of Cáceres, Antioquia in the Antioquia Department of Colombia

- Location in Colombia
- Coordinates: 7°40′N 75°20′W
- Country: Colombia
- Department: Antioquia Department
- Subregion: Bajo Cauca
- Named for: Province of Cáceres, Spain

Population (2015)
  - Total: 37,806
- Time zone: UTC-5 (Colombia Standard Time)

Cáceres (Spanish pronunciation: [ˈkaseɾes]) is a town and municipality in the Colombian department of Antioquia.

Cáceres is one of the oldest towns in Antioquia. Its history is linked to the exploitation of gold. The town was founded in 1576 by Captain Don Gaspar de Rodas, who arrived on the banks of the Cauca River, advancing on the right bank. He ordered the installation of 30 ranches with a ceremony and named the town San Martín de Cáceres.
